= 2022 Charlotte 49ers baseball team =

Baseball team season

2022 Charlotte 49ers baseball
- Conference: Conference USA
- Record: 36–22 (17–13 C-USA)
- Head coach: Robert Woodard
- Assistant coaches: Toby Bicknell; Austin Meine; Tyler Simmons
- Home stadium: Robert and Mariam Hayes Stadium

2022 Conference USA baseball standings
	Conf.						Overall
Team	W		L		T	PCT	W		L		T	PCT
No. 15 Southern Miss ‍†‍‍^{y}	23	–	7	–	0	.767	43	–	16	–	0	.729
Louisiana Tech ‍‍‡‍^{y}	20	–	10	–	0	.667	42	–	19	–	0	.689
Old Dominion ‍‍‍	19	–	11	–	0	.633	41	–	17	–	0	.707
Florida Atlantic ‍‍‍	19	–	11	–	0	.633	35	–	23	–	0	.603
UTSA ‍‍‍	19	–	11	–	0	.633	38	–	20	–	0	.655
Middle Tennessee ‍‍‍	17	–	13	–	0	.567	29	–	26	–	0	.527
Charlotte ‍‍‍	17	–	13	–	0	.567	36	–	22	–	0	.621
UAB ‍‍‍	13	–	17	–	0	.433	31	–	25	–	0	.554
Rice ‍‍‍	9	–	21	–	0	.300	17	–	39	–	0	.304
Marshall ‍‍‍	9	–	21	–	0	.300	20	–	34	–	1	.373
FIU ‍‍‍	8	–	22	–	0	.267	16	–	34	–	0	.320
Western Kentucky ‍‍‍	7	–	23	–	0	.233	18	–	36	–	0	.333
† – Conference champion ‡ – Tournament champion y – Invited to the NCAA tournament Rankings from D1Baseball

The 2022 Charlotte 49ers baseball team represented the University of North Carolina at Charlotte in the sport of baseball for the 2022 college baseball season. The 49ers competed in Division I of the National Collegiate Athletic Association (NCAA) and in Conference USA. They played their home games at Robert and Mariam Hayes Stadium in Charlotte, North Carolina. The team was coached by Robert Woodard, who was in his third season with the 49ers.

== Preseason ==
=== C-USA media poll ===
The Conference USA preseason poll was released on February 16, 2022 with the 49ers predicted to finish in fourth place in the conference.

Media poll
Predicted finish	Team	1st Place Votes
1	Southern Miss	6
2	Louisiana Tech	2
3	Old Dominion	1
4	Charlotte	4
5	Florida Atlantic	-
6	UTSA	-
7	FIU	1
8	Rice	-
9	Western Kentucky	-
10	Middle Tennessee	-
11	UAB	-
12	Marshall	-

== Personnel ==
2022 Charlotte 49ers baseball team
Players
Coaches

#	Pos.	Name	B/T	Height	Weight	Year	Home town
1	OF	Cam Fisher	L/R	6 ft 2 in (1.88 m)	210 lb (95 kg)	Fr	Knoxville, Tennessee
2	INF	JD Suarez	R/R	6 ft 1 in (1.85 m)	180 lb (82 kg)	Fr	Charlotte, North Carolina
3	INF	Dante DeFranco	R/R	5 ft 9 in (1.75 m)	165 lb (75 kg)	Fr	Hillsborough, North Carolina
6	INF	Jack Dragum	R/R	6 ft 1 in (1.85 m)	200 lb (91 kg)	Jr	Mechanicsville, Virginia
8	OF	Blake Jackson	L/L	6 ft 0 in (1.83 m)	190 lb (86 kg)	Fr	Coppell, Texas
9	C	Kaden Hopson	L/R	6 ft 2 in (1.88 m)	200 lb (91 kg)	So	Redlands, California
11	LHP	AJ Wilson	L/L	6 ft 3 in (1.91 m)	210 lb (95 kg)	So	Pilot Mountain, North Carolina
12	C	Huck Wathan	R/R	6 ft 4 in (1.93 m)	195 lb (88 kg)	Fr	Charlotte, North Carolina
14	INF	Austin Knight	R/R	6 ft 2 in (1.88 m)	180 lb (82 kg)	Jr	Jacksonville, Florida
16	INF	Nate Furman	L/R	5 ft 8 in (1.73 m)	180 lb (82 kg)	So	Brookhaven, Pennsylvania
18	LHP	Will Lancaster	L/L	6 ft 3 in (1.91 m)	215 lb (98 kg)	Sr	Lexington, North Carolina
21	RHP	Colby Bruce (redshirt)	R/R	6 ft 5 in (1.96 m)	195 lb (88 kg)	Sr	Charlotte, North Carolina
22	INF	Will Butcher	R/R	6 ft 2 in (1.88 m)	210 lb (95 kg)	So	Arden, North Carolina
23	INF	Josh Madole	L/L	6 ft 1 in (1.85 m)	195 lb (88 kg)	Gr	Hampstead, North Carolina
24	INF	David McCabe	R/R	6 ft 4 in (1.93 m)	230 lb (104 kg)	So	Oshawa, Ontario
26	C	Drew Tyndall	R/R	6 ft 1 in (1.85 m)	195 lb (88 kg)	Fr	Wilmington, North Carolina
27	LHP	Christian Lothes	R/L	6 ft 2 in (1.88 m)	225 lb (102 kg)	So	Hebron, Ohio
29	RHP	Paxton Thompson	R/R	6 ft 1 in (1.85 m)	205 lb (93 kg)	So	St. Michael, Minnesota
30	RHP	Michael Oh	R/R	6 ft 3 in (1.91 m)	220 lb (100 kg)	Gr	Northbrook, Illinois
32	RHP	Breven Yarbro	R/R	6 ft 3 in (1.91 m)	220 lb (100 kg)	Fr	Chaffee, Missouri
33	OF	Jake Cunningham	R/R	6 ft 4 in (1.93 m)	205 lb (93 kg)	So	Charlotte, North Carolina
34	RHP	Evan Michelson	R/R	6 ft 0 in (1.83 m)	205 lb (93 kg)	So	Jacksonville, Florida
36	RHP	Anthony Casciola	R/R	6 ft 2 in (1.88 m)	195 lb (88 kg)	So	Charlotte, North Carolina
37	LHP	Collin Kramer	L/L	6 ft 5 in (1.96 m)	205 lb (93 kg)	Fr	St. Ansgar, Iowa
38	RHP	Jackson Boss (redshirt)	R/R	6 ft 0 in (1.83 m)	180 lb (82 kg)	Sr	Loganville, Georgia
41	RHP	Matt Brooks (redshirt)	R/R	6 ft 1 in (1.85 m)	210 lb (95 kg)	Sr	York, Pennsylvania
43	RHP	Hale Sims	R/R	6 ft 4 in (1.93 m)	290 lb (132 kg)	Jr	Paducah, Kentucky
44	RHP	Cameron Hansen	R/R	6 ft 5 in (1.96 m)	235 lb (107 kg)	Fr	Hendersonville, Tennessee
45	OF	Hunter Baker	L/R	6 ft 0 in (1.83 m)	205 lb (93 kg)	Jr	Huntersville, North Carolina
46	LHP	Matt Little	L/L	6 ft 1 in (1.85 m)	180 lb (82 kg)	Fr	Fayetteville, North Carolina
47	OF	Jakob Kouneski	R/R	6 ft 2 in (1.88 m)	190 lb (86 kg)	Fr	St. Paul, Minnesota
50	RHP	Nolan Straniero	R/R	6 ft 2 in (1.88 m)	190 lb (86 kg)	Fr	Raleigh, North Carolina
51	LHP	Quinton Martinez	L/L	6 ft 4 in (1.93 m)	190 lb (86 kg)	Sr	Orlando, Florida
52	RHP	Tony Rossi	R/R	6 ft 3 in (1.91 m)	230 lb (104 kg)	So	Lake Mary, Florida
54	LHP	Spencer Giesting	L/L	6 ft 4 in (1.93 m)	200 lb (91 kg)	So	Hamilton, Ohio
57	RHP	Ari Gordon	R/R	6 ft 3 in (1.91 m)	220 lb (100 kg)	Jr	Buffalo Grove, Illinois

Head coach

Robert Woodard (North Carolina)

Assistant coach(es)

Tony Bickell (UNC Pembroke)
Austin Meine (Lindenwood)
Tyler Simmons (Wingate)

Legend

- (C) Team captain
- (S) Suspended
- (I) Ineligible
- Injured
- Current redshirt

Roster
Last update: 5 August 2022

== Schedule and results ==
2022 Charlotte 49ers baseball game log
Regular season (35–20)

February (3–3)
Date	Opponent	Rank	Site/stadium	Score	Win	Loss	Save	TV	Attendance	Overall record	C-USA record
Feb. 18	vs. Louisville		USF Baseball Stadium • Tampa, FL	L 7–8	Hawks (1-0)	Martinez (0-1)	Prosecky (1)		469	0–1	
Feb. 19	vs. UConn		USF Baseball Stadium • Tampa, FL	W 7–3	Rossi (1-0)	Gallagher (0-1)	Bruce (1)			1–1	
Feb. 20	at South Florida		USF Baseball Stadium • Tampa, FL	W 8–3^{8}	Lancaster (1-0)	Cebert (0-1)	None	ESPN+	1,497	2–1	
Feb. 25	West Virginia		Robert and Mariam Hayes Stadium • Charlotte, NC	L 4–5	Watters (1-1)	Bruce (0-1)	None	ESPN+	1,136	2–2	
Feb. 26	West Virginia		Robert and Mariam Hayes Stadium • Charlotte, NC	L 2–9	Hampton (2-0)	Hansen (0-1)	None	CUSA.TV	1,180	2–3	
Feb. 26	West Virginia		Robert and Mariam Hayes Stadium • Charlotte, NC	W 5–4	Michelson (1-0)	Smith (0-1)	Oh (1)	CUSA.TV	1,180	3–3	

March (14–4)
Date	Opponent	Rank	Site/stadium	Score	Win	Loss	Save	TV	Attendance	Overall record	C-USA record
Mar. 1	Gardner–Webb		Robert and Mariam Hayes Stadium • Charlotte, NC	W 11–5	Brooks (1-0)	Young (0-1)	None		568	4–3	
Mar. 2	Purdue		Robert and Mariam Hayes Stadium • Charlotte, NC	L 2–6	Wendell (2-0)	Thompson (0-1)	Stephen (1)	CUSA.TV	655	4–4	
Mar. 4	Western Illinois		Robert and Mariam Hayes Stadium • Charlotte, NC	W 4–3	Bruce (1-1)	Raymond (0-1)	None		574	5–4	
Mar. 5	Western Illinois		Robert and Mariam Hayes Stadium • Charlotte, NC	W 29–4	Hansen (1-1)	Warkentien (1-1)	None		765	6–4	
Mar. 6	Western Illinois		Robert and Mariam Hayes Stadium • Charlotte, NC	W 16–1^{7}	Lancaster (2-0)	Fochs (0-2)	None		804	7–4	
Mar. 8	Longwood		Robert and Mariam Hayes Stadium • Charlotte, NC	W 8–4	Kramer (1-0)	Taylor (0-1)	Bruce (2)		441	8–4	
Mar. 11	Appalachian State		Robert and Mariam Hayes Stadium • Charlotte, NC	W 9–3	Rossi (2-0)	Tuthill (1-3)	None	CUSA.TV	452	9–4	
Mar. 12	Appalachian State		Robert and Mariam Hayes Stadium • Charlotte, NC	W 12–7	Wilson (1-0)	Kepley (1-1)	None	CUSA.TV	815	10–4	
Mar. 13	Appalachian State		Robert and Mariam Hayes Stadium • Charlotte, NC	L 7–9^{12}	Carter (1-1)	Thompson (0-2)	None	ESPN+	830	10–5	
Mar. 15	Presbyterian		Robert and Mariam Hayes Stadium • Charlotte, NC	W 4–1	Wilson (2-0)	Klepper (0-3)	Bruce (3)		607	11–5	
Mar. 18	vs. Western Kentucky		Truist Field • Charlotte, NC	L 5–7	Kates (3-1)	Giesting (0-1)	Vinyard (4)	CUSA.TV	2,023	11–6	0–1
Mar. 19	Western Kentucky		Robert and Mariam Hayes Stadium • Charlotte, NC	W 3–1	Hansen (2-1)	Peter (0-3)	None	CUSA.TV	849	12–6	1–1
Mar. 20	Western Kentucky		Robert and Mariam Hayes Stadium • Charlotte, NC	W 13–12	Kramer (2-0)	Vinyard (2-1)	None	ESPN+	778	13–6	2–1
Mar. 22	vs. Campbell		Atrium Health Ballpark • Kannapolis, NC	W 12–4	Casciola (1-0)	Ferguson (0-2)	None	CUSA.TV	1,686	14–6	
Mar. 23	Davidson		Robert and Mariam Hayes Stadium • Charlotte, NC	Game postponed							
Mar. 25	at Old Dominion		Bud Metheny Baseball Complex • Norfolk, VA	W 11–4	Giesting (1-1)	Gertner (1-2)	Wilson (1)	CUSA.TV	418	15–6	3–1
Mar. 26	at Old Dominion		Bud Metheny Baseball Complex • Norfolk, VA	W 13–8	Lancaster (3-0)	Hartline (0-1)	None	CUSA.TV	471	16–6	4–1
Mar. 27	at Old Dominion		Bud Metheny Baseball Complex • Norfolk, VA	L 12–13^{10}	Dean (2-0)	Martinez (0-2)	None	CUSA.TV	263	16–7	4–2
Mar. 29	College of Charleston		Robert and Mariam Hayes Stadium • Charlotte, NC	W 9–0	Sims (1-0)	Smith (0-2)	None	CUSA.TV	807	17–7	

April (10–9)
Date	Opponent	Rank	Site/stadium	Score	Win	Loss	Save	TV	Attendance	Overall record	C-USA record
Apr. 1	at UTSA		Roadrunner Field • San Antonio, TX	L 3–13	Malone (4-0)	Giesting (1-2)	None	CUSA.TV	509	17–8	4–3
Apr. 2	at UTSA		Roadrunner Field • San Antonio, TX	L 7–8	Chomko (2-0)	Hansen (2-2)	Shafer (3)	CUSA.TV	385	17–9	4–4
Apr. 3	at UTSA		Roadrunner Field • San Antonio, TX	L 5–8^{7}	Miller (1-0)	Brooks (1-1)	Shafer (4)	CUSA.TV	263	17–10	4–5
Apr. 6	at Winthrop		Winthrop Ballpark • Rock Hill, SC	L 6–9	Lumpkin (2-0)	Martinez (0-3)	Whittle (2)	ESPN+	198	17–11	
Apr. 8	No. 18 Southern Miss		Robert and Mariam Hayes Stadium • Charlotte, NC	L 1–2	Hall (5-0)	Giesting (1-3)	Harper (5)	ESPN+	775	17–12	4–6
Apr. 9	No. 18 Southern Miss		Robert and Mariam Hayes Stadium • Charlotte, NC	L 2–8	Riggins (4-2)	Lancaster (3-1)	None	ESPN+	872	17–13	4–7
Apr. 10	No. 18 Southern Miss		Robert and Mariam Hayes Stadium • Charlotte, NC	L 5–6^{13}	Ramsey (4-0)	Sims (1-1)	None	ESPN+	877	17–14	4–8
Apr. 12	Winthrop		Robert and Mariam Hayes Stadium • Charlotte, NC	W 8–0	Brooks (2-1)	Johnson (0-1)	None		740	18–14	
Apr. 14	at Middle Tennessee		Reese Smith Jr. Field • Murfreesboro, TN	L 3–4^{11}	Wigginton (5-2)	Bruce (1-2)	None	CUSA.TV	525	18–15	4–9
Apr. 15	at Middle Tennessee		Reese Smith Jr. Field • Murfreesboro, TN	W 10–5	Sims (2-1)	Swan (2-5)	None	CUSA.TV	415	19–15	5–9
Apr. 16	at Middle Tennessee		Reese Smith Jr. Field • Murfreesboro, TN	L 7–10	Hamm (3-2)	Giesting (1-4)	None	CUSA.TV	515	19–16	5–10
Apr. 19	Coastal Carolina		Robert and Mariam Hayes Stadium • Charlotte, NC	W 11–3	Rossi (3-0)	Billings (0-3)	None	ESPN+	817	20–16	
Apr. 22	UAB		Robert and Mariam Hayes Stadium • Charlotte, NC	W 6–3	Giesting (2-4)	Reynolds (2-4)	Rossi (1)	ESPN+	714	21–16	6–10
Apr. 23	UAB		Robert and Mariam Hayes Stadium • Charlotte, NC	W 8–1	Wilson (3-0)	O'Clair (1-3)	None	ESPN+	826	22–16	7–10
Apr. 24	UAB		Robert and Mariam Hayes Stadium • Charlotte, NC	W 3–2	Giesting (3-4)	Moza (2-1)	Wilson (2)	ESPN+	745	23–16	8–10
Apr. 26	UNC Asheville		Robert and Mariam Hayes Stadium • Charlotte, NC	W 5–0	Brooks (3-1)	Allmer (0-2)	None		710	24–16	
Apr. 27	North Carolina A&T		Robert and Mariam Hayes Stadium • Charlotte, NC	W 11–3	Hansen (3-2)	Fields (0-1)	None		741	25–16	
Apr. 29	at Marshall		Kennedy Center Field • Huntington, WV	W 11–4	Giesting (4-4)	Purnell (5-3)	None	YouTube.TV	78	26–16	9–10
Apr. 30	at Marshall		Kennedy Center Field • Huntington, WV	W 25–4	Lancaster (4-1)	Copen (2-3)	None	YouTube.TV	68	27–16	10–10

May (8–4)
Date	Opponent	Rank	Site/stadium	Score	Win	Loss	Save	TV	Attendance	Overall record	C-USA record
May 1	at Marshall		Kennedy Center Field • Huntington, WV	W 14–12	Rossi (4-0)	Agemy (2-2)	Martinez (1)	YouTube.TV	88	28–16	11–10
May 3	at North Carolina		Boshamer Stadium • Chapel Hill, NC	L 3–4^{10}	Bovair (4-3)	Kramer (2-1)	None	ACCN	1,876	28–17	
May 6	Rice		Robert and Mariam Hayes Stadium • Charlotte, NC	W 13–0	Sims (3-1)	Shaw (2-1)	None	CUSA.TV	621	29–17	12–10
May 7	Rice		Robert and Mariam Hayes Stadium • Charlotte, NC	W 14–13	Giesting (5-4)	DeLeon (3-4)	Brooks (1)	ESPN+	733	30–17	13–10
May 8	Rice		Robert and Mariam Hayes Stadium • Charlotte, NC	W 9–0	Kramer (2-1)	Deskins (2-6)	None	ESPN+	730	31–17	14–10
May 13	at Florida Atlantic		FAU Baseball Stadium • Boca Raton, FL	W 10–3	Giesting (6-4)	Cooley (7-4)	None	CUSA.TV	382	32–17	15–10
May 14	at Florida Atlantic		FAU Baseball Stadium • Boca Raton, FL	L 9–10^{15}	Del Prado (2-1)	Brooks (3-2)	None	CUSA.TV	430	32–18	15–11
May 15	at Florida Atlantic		FAU Baseball Stadium • Boca Raton, FL	W 14–4^{7}	Martinez (1-3)	Burnham (6-1)	None	CUSA.TV	370	33–18	16–11
May 17	at South Carolina		Founders Park • Columbia, SC	W 8–3	Rossi (5-0)	Hunter (5-5)	None	SECN+	6,034	34–18	17–11
May 19	at Louisiana Tech		Robert and Mariam Hayes Stadium • Charlotte, NC	W 11–3	Giesting (7-4)	Gibson (5-4)	None	ESPN+	674	35–18	18–11
May 20	Louisiana Tech		Robert and Mariam Hayes Stadium • Charlotte, NC	L 3–8	Crigger (4-2)	Kramer (3-2)	None	ESPN+	773	35–19	18–12
May 21	Louisiana Tech		Robert and Mariam Hayes Stadium • Charlotte, NC	L 5–14^{7}	Fincher (7-2)	Lancaster (4-2)	None	ESPN+	787	35–20	18–13

Postseason (1–2)

C-USA Tournament (1–2)
Date	Opponent	(Seed)/Rank	Site/stadium	Score	Win	Loss	Save	TV	Attendance	Overall record	Tournament record
May 25	vs. (2) Louisiana Tech	(7)	Pete Taylor Park • Hattiesburg, MS	L 0–4	Gibson (6-4)	Michelson (1-1)	None	ESPN+		35–21	0–1
May 26	vs. (6) Middle Tennessee	(7)	Pete Taylor Park • Hattiesburg, MS	W 22–0^{7}	Kramer (4-2)	Wigginton (6-5)	None	ESPN+		36–21	1–1
May 27	vs. (3) Old Dominion	(7)	Pete Taylor Park • Hattiesburg, MS	L 4–13	Gomez (5-1)	Rossi (5-1)	None	ESPN+		36–22	1–2

Legend: = Win = Loss = Cancelled

Schedule source:

*Rankings are based on the team's current ranking in the D1Baseball poll.

== Postseason ==
Accolade	Recipient	Reference
First Team All-CUSA team	Jack Dragum, INF; David McCabe, DH	
Second Team All-CUSA team	Nate Furman, INF; Cam Fisher, OF	
