= 2022 UTSA Roadrunners baseball team =

Baseball team season

2022 UTSA Roadrunners baseball
- Conference: Conference USA
- Record: 38–20 (19–11 C-USA)
- Head coach: Patrick Hallmark
- Assistant coaches: Ryan Aguayo; Zach Butler
- Home stadium: Roadrunner Field

2022 Conference USA baseball standings
	Conf.						Overall
Team	W		L		T	PCT	W		L		T	PCT
No. 15 Southern Miss ‍†‍‍^{y}	23	–	7	–	0	.767	43	–	16	–	0	.729
Louisiana Tech ‍‍‡‍^{y}	20	–	10	–	0	.667	42	–	19	–	0	.689
Old Dominion ‍‍‍	19	–	11	–	0	.633	41	–	17	–	0	.707
Florida Atlantic ‍‍‍	19	–	11	–	0	.633	35	–	23	–	0	.603
UTSA ‍‍‍	19	–	11	–	0	.633	38	–	20	–	0	.655
Middle Tennessee ‍‍‍	17	–	13	–	0	.567	29	–	26	–	0	.527
Charlotte ‍‍‍	17	–	13	–	0	.567	36	–	22	–	0	.621
UAB ‍‍‍	13	–	17	–	0	.433	31	–	25	–	0	.554
Rice ‍‍‍	9	–	21	–	0	.300	17	–	39	–	0	.304
Marshall ‍‍‍	9	–	21	–	0	.300	20	–	34	–	1	.373
FIU ‍‍‍	8	–	22	–	0	.267	16	–	34	–	0	.320
Western Kentucky ‍‍‍	7	–	23	–	0	.233	18	–	36	–	0	.333
† – Conference champion ‡ – Tournament champion y – Invited to the NCAA tournament Rankings from D1Baseball

The 2022 UTSA Roadrunners baseball team represented the University of Texas at San Antonio in the sport of baseball for the 2022 college baseball season. The Roadrunners competed in Division I of the National Collegiate Athletic Association (NCAA) and in Conference USA. They played their home games at Roadrunner Field in San Antonio, Texas. The team was coached by Patrick Hallmark, who was in his third season with the Roadrunners.

== Preseason ==
=== C-USA media poll ===
The Conference USA preseason poll was released on February 16, 2022 with the Roadrunners predicted to finish in sixth place in the conference.

Media poll
Predicted finish	Team	1st Place Votes
1	Southern Miss	6
2	Louisiana Tech	2
3	Old Dominion	1
4	Charlotte	2
5	Florida Atlantic	-
6	UTSA	-
7	FIU	1
8	Rice	-
9	Western Kentucky	-
10	Middle Tennessee	-
11	UAB	-
12	Marshall	-

=== Preseason All-CUSA team ===
- Jonathan Tapia – Utility

== Personnel ==
2022 UTSA Roadrunners baseball team
Players
Coaches

#	Pos.	Name	B/T	Height	Weight	Year	Home town
1	INF	Jonathan Tapia	R/R	5 ft 9 in (1.75 m)	185 lb (84 kg)	Sr	San Antonio, Texas
2	INF	Isaiah Walker	R/R	6 ft 1 in (1.85 m)	175 lb (79 kg)	Fr	Rosharon, Texas
3	INF	Matt King	R/R	6 ft 0 in (1.83 m)	190 lb (86 kg)	Fr	Kingwood, Texas
4	OF	Chase Keng	L/L	6 ft 1 in (1.85 m)	195 lb (88 kg)	Sr	Deer Park, Texas
5	C	Josh Killeen (redshirt)	R/R	5 ft 10 in (1.78 m)	185 lb (84 kg)	So	San Antonio, Texas
6	RHP	Ryan Beaird	R/R	5 ft 11 in (1.8 m)	165 lb (75 kg)	Fr	San Antonio, Texas
8	INF	Leyton Barry	L/R	6 ft 2 in (1.88 m)	195 lb (88 kg)	Jr	Houston, Texas
9	INF	Austin Ochoa	R/R	6 ft 2 in (1.88 m)	215 lb (98 kg)	So	Refugio, Texas
11	RHP	Hunter Mayo (redshirt)	R/R	6 ft 0 in (1.83 m)	190 lb (86 kg)	So	Hudson, Texas
12	INF	Austin Biehl	R/R	6 ft 0 in (1.83 m)	185 lb (84 kg)	Jr	Mahomet, Illinois
13	RHP	Kyle Sonduck	R/R	5 ft 11 in (1.8 m)	195 lb (88 kg)	So	Katy, Texas
14	RHP	Ryan Ward	R/R	6 ft 2 in (1.88 m)	190 lb (86 kg)	So	Schertz, Texas
15	OF	Ian Bailey	R/R	5 ft 11 in (1.8 m)	200 lb (91 kg)	Gr	San Antonio, Texas
16	INF	Garrett Poston (redshirt)	L/R	6 ft 0 in (1.83 m)	195 lb (88 kg)	So	League City, Texas
17	LHP	Josh Salinas	L/L	5 ft 10 in (1.78 m)	190 lb (86 kg)	So	Corpus Christi, Texas
18	INF	Kody Darcy	R/R	6 ft 2 in (1.88 m)	195 lb (88 kg)	Gr	Kent, Washington
19	OF	Garrett Brooks	R/R	6 ft 0 in (1.83 m)	190 lb (86 kg)	Fr	Spring Branch, Texas
21	OF	Shane Sirdashney	R/R	6 ft 1 in (1.85 m)	200 lb (91 kg)	Jr	The Woodlands, Texas
22	RHP	Drake Smith	R/R	6 ft 1 in (1.85 m)	185 lb (84 kg)	So	Katy, Texas
23	RHP	Daniel Garza	R/R	5 ft 11 in (1.8 m)	180 lb (82 kg)	So	Houston, Texas
24	INF	Ryan Flores	L/L	5 ft 11 in (1.8 m)	215 lb (98 kg)	Sr	Corpus Christi, Texas
25	RHP	Braden Davis	R/R	6 ft 3 in (1.91 m)	215 lb (98 kg)	Fr	Austin, Texas
26	C	Nick Crespo	R/R	5 ft 11 in (1.8 m)	185 lb (84 kg)	So	Alpine, Texas
27	RHP	Abraham Deleon (redshirt)	L/R	6 ft 0 in (1.83 m)	190 lb (86 kg)	So	Spring, Texas
28	RHP	Allen Smith	R/R	6 ft 3 in (1.91 m)	205 lb (93 kg)	So	Frisco, Texas
29	RHP	Jacob Jimenez	R/R	6 ft 3 in (1.91 m)	220 lb (100 kg)	Sr	Houston, Texas
30	RHP	John Chomko	R/R	6 ft 2 in (1.88 m)	190 lb (86 kg)	Jr	Tomball, Texas
32	RHP	Simon Miller	R/R	6 ft 2 in (1.88 m)	210 lb (95 kg)	So	Canton, Texas
33	RHP	Reece Easterling	R/R	6 ft 1 in (1.85 m)	205 lb (93 kg)	Gr	Bryan, Texas
34	RHP	Luke Malone (redshirt)	R/R	6 ft 3 in (1.91 m)	215 lb (98 kg)	Jr	Round Rock, Texas
35	LHP	Jay Ward	L/L	5 ft 11 in (1.8 m)	175 lb (79 kg)	Jr	Lake Villa, Illinois
36	RHP	Ulises Quiroga	R/R	6 ft 2 in (1.88 m)	195 lb (88 kg)	So	Baytown, Texas
38	LHP	Grant Miller	L/L	6 ft 3 in (1.91 m)	215 lb (98 kg)	Gr	Round Rock, Texas
39	RHP	Daniel Shafer	R/R	6 ft 3 in (1.91 m)	215 lb (98 kg)	Jr	Willis, Texas
40	RHP	Braylon Owens	R/R	6 ft 2 in (1.88 m)	230 lb (104 kg)	Fr	Elgin, Texas
42	RHP	Fischer Kingsbery	R/R	6 ft 2 in (1.88 m)	215 lb (98 kg)	So	Leander, Texas
44	C	Sammy Diaz	R/R	6 ft 3 in (1.91 m)	220 lb (100 kg)	Jr	Desert Hot Springs, California
45	RHP	Austin Brewer (redshirt)	R/R	6 ft 0 in (1.83 m)	175 lb (79 kg)	Fr	Cypress, Texas

Head coach

Patrick Hallmark (Rice)

Assistant coach(es)

Ryan Aguayo (New Mexico State)
Zach Butler (McNeese State)
Alan Sailors (Mary Hardin–Baylor)

Legend

- (C) Team captain
- (S) Suspended
- (I) Ineligible
- Injured
- Current redshirt

Roster
Last update: 4 August 2022

== Schedule and results ==
2022 UTSA Roadrunners baseball game log
Regular season (35–19)

February (7–1)
Date	Opponent	Rank	Site/stadium	Score	Win	Loss	Save	TV	Attendance	Overall record	C-USA record
Feb. 18	at Tarleton State		Cecil Ballow Baseball Complex • Stephenville, TX	W 21–5	Jimenez (1-0)	Hackett (0-1)	None		727	1–0	
Feb. 19	at Tarleton State		Cecil Ballow Baseball Complex • Stephenville, TX	W 12–8	Quiroga (1-0)	Mentzel (0-1)	None		640	2–0	
Feb. 20	at Tarleton State		Cecil Ballow Baseball Complex • Stephenville, TX	L 1–12	Adams (1-0)	Owens (0-1)	None		685	2–1	
Feb. 23	at No. 17 TCU		Lupton Stadium • Fort Worth, TX	Game postponed							
Feb. 25	Seattle		Roadrunner Field • San Antonio, TX	W 7–3	Easterling (1-0)	German (0-1)	None	CUSA.TV	157	3–1	
Feb. 25	Seattle		Roadrunner Field • San Antonio, TX	W 3–2	Malone (1-0)	Chronowski (0-2)	Shafer (1)	CUSA.TV	157	4–1	
Feb. 26	Seattle		Roadrunner Field • San Antonio, TX	W 11–0	Miller (1-0)	Liddle (0-1)	None	CUSA.TV	284	5–1	
Feb. 27	Seattle		Roadrunner Field • San Antonio, TX	W 13–0	Davis (1-0)	Jemal (0-1)	None		303	6–1	
Feb. 28	No. 6 Stanford		Roadrunner Field • San Antonio, TX	W 6–5^{10}	Chomko (1-0)	O'Rourke (0-1)	None	CUSA.TV	408	7–1	

March (8–9)
Date	Opponent	Rank	Site/stadium	Score	Win	Loss	Save	TV	Attendance	Overall record	C-USA record
Mar. 4	Southern		Roadrunner Field • San Antonio, TX	W 15–4	Jimenez (2-0)	Battaglia (0-2)	None	CUSA.TV	437	8–1	
Mar. 5	Southern		Roadrunner Field • San Antonio, TX	L 4–11	Fidanza (1-0)	Quiroga (1-1)	None	CUSA.TV	425	8–2	
Mar. 6	Southern		Roadrunner Field • San Antonio, TX	W 15–7	Salinas (1-0)	Wilson (0-1)	None	CUSA.TV	285	9–2	
Mar. 8	Incarnate Word		Roadrunner Field • San Antonio, TX	W 6–0	Malone (2-0)	Stacey (0-2)	None	CUSA.TV	488	10–2	
Mar. 12	at Oklahoma		L. Dale Mitchell Baseball Park • Norman, OK	L 5–10	Bennett (1-0)	Jimenez (2-1)	None	SoonerSports.TV	750	10–3	
Mar. 13	at Oklahoma		L. Dale Mitchell Baseball Park • Norman, OK	L 3–8	Sandlin (2-2)	Quiroga (1-2)	None	SoonerSports.TV		10–4	
Mar. 13	at Oklahoma		L. Dale Mitchell Baseball Park • Norman, OK	L 5–9	Martinez (2-1)	Davis (1-1)	Michael (3)		725	10–5	
Mar. 15	at Houston Baptist		Husky Field • Houston, TX	W 10–5	Garza (1-0)	Reitmeyer (1-1)	None	ESPN+	405	11–5	
Mar. 18	Louisiana Tech		Roadrunner Field • San Antonio, TX	L 5–6	Gibson (2-1)	Miller (1-1)	Crigger (2)	CUSA.TV	782	11–6	0–1
Mar. 19	Louisiana Tech		Roadrunner Field • San Antonio, TX	L 4–5	Tomkins (2-0)	Shafer (0-1)	Crigger (3)	CUSA.TV	553	11–7	0–2
Mar. 20	Louisiana Tech		Roadrunner Field • San Antonio, TX	W 13–3	Owens (1-1)	Whorff (1-3)	None	CUSA.TV	134	12–7	1–2
Mar. 22	at Baylor		Baylor Ballpark • Waco, TX	L 2–3	Jackson (2-2)	Miller (1-2)	None	ESPN+	1,393	12–8	
Mar. 25	at Florida Atlantic		FAU Baseball Stadium • Boca Raton, FL	W 5–4	Malone (3-0)	Cooley (3-1)	Shafer (2)	CUSA.TV	364	13–8	2–2
Mar. 26	at Florida Atlantic		FAU Baseball Stadium • Boca Raton, FL	L 9–12	Waterbor (2-2)	Quiroga (1-3)	Wegielnik (2)	CUSA.TV	417	13–9	2–3
Mar. 27	at Florida Atlantic		FAU Baseball Stadium • Boca Raton, FL	L 4–8	Josey (3-2)	Miller (1-3)	None	CUSA.TV	355	13–10	2–4
Mar. 29	at Incarnate Word		Sullivan Field • San Antonio, TX	W 6–4^{10}	Shafer (1-1)	Hayward (0-1)	Malone (1)	StretchLive	267	14–10	
Mar. 30	at No. 12 TCU		Lupton Stadium • Fort Worth, TX	W 12–8	Ward (1-0)	Oliver (0-1)	None	ESPN+	3,301	15–10	

April (15–3)
Date	Opponent	Rank	Site/stadium	Score	Win	Loss	Save	TV	Attendance	Overall record	C-USA record
Apr. 1	Charlotte		Roadrunner Field • San Antonio, TX	W 13–3	Malone (4-0)	Giesting (1-2)	None	CUSA.TV	509	16–10	3–4
Apr. 2	Charlotte		Roadrunner Field • San Antonio, TX	W 8–7	Chomko (2-0)	Hansen (2-2)	Shafer (3)	CUSA.TV	385	17–10	4–4
Apr. 3	Charlotte		Roadrunner Field • San Antonio, TX	W 8–5	Miller (1-0)	Brooks (1-1)	Shafer (4)	CUSA.TV	263	18–10	5–4
Apr. 6	Stephen F. Austin		Roadrunner Field • San Antonio, TX	W 14–4	Easterling (2-0)	Parker (0-3)	None	CUSA.TV	551	19–10	
Apr. 8	at Old Dominion		Bud Metheny Baseball Complex • Norfolk, VA	L 0–11	Morgan (2-0)	Malone (4-1)	Gomez (1)	CUSA.TV	86	19–11	5–5
Apr. 9	at Old Dominion		Bud Metheny Baseball Complex • Norfolk, VA	W 8–7	Shafer (2-1)	Dean (2-1)	None	CUSA.TV	392	20–11	6–5
Apr. 10	at Old Dominion		Bud Metheny Baseball Complex • Norfolk, VA	W 13–4	Davis (2-1)	Armstrong (2-1)	None	CUSA.TV	204	21–11	7–5
Apr. 13	at Sam Houston State		Don Sanders Stadium • Huntsville, TX	W 2–0	Beaird (1-0)	Ruddis (0-4)	Shafer (5)	ESPN+	940	22–11	
Apr. 15	at Rice		Reckling Park • Houston, TX	W 9–2	Malone (5-1)	Chandler (1-6)	None	CUSA.TV	1,927	23–11	8–5
Apr. 16	at Rice		Reckling Park • Houston, TX	W 15–4	Shafer (3-1)	DeLeon (2-2)	None	CUSA.TV	2,463	24–11	9–5
Apr. 17	at Rice		Reckling Park • Houston, TX	L 7–16	Deskins (2-5)	Davis (2-2)	None	CUSA.TV	1,828	24–12	9–6
Apr. 19	at No. 17 Texas State		Bobcat Ballpark • San Marcos, TX	L 12–14	Dixon (6-0)	Beaird (1-1)	Stivors (8)	ESPN+	1,517	24–13	
Apr. 22	FIU		Roadrunner Field • San Antonio, TX	W 12–4	Malone (6-1)	Martin (0-3)	None	CUSA.TV	303	25–13	10–6
Apr. 23	FIU		Roadrunner Field • San Antonio, TX	W 8–1	Miller (2-3)	Pridgen (2-5)	None	CUSA.TV	319	26–13	11–6
Apr. 24	FIU		Roadrunner Field • San Antonio, TX	W 9–8	Owens (2-1)	Tiburcio (2-3)	None	CUSA.TV	183	27–13	12–6
Apr. 26	No. 17 Texas State		Roadrunner Field • San Antonio, TX	W 14–8	Beaird (2-1)	Nicholas (1-1)	None	CUSA.TV	563	28–13	
Apr. 29	at Middle Tennessee		Reese Smith Jr. Field • Murfreesboro, TN	W 13–2	Garza (2-0)	Keenan (4-4)	None	CUSA.TV	547	29–13	13–6
Apr. 30	at Middle Tennessee		Reese Smith Jr. Field • Murfreesboro, TN	W 12–4	Malone (7-1)	Wigginton (5-4)	None	CUSA.TV	589	30–13	14–6

May (5–6)
Date	Opponent	Rank	Site/stadium	Score	Win	Loss	Save	TV	Attendance	Overall record	C-USA record
May 1	at Middle Tennessee		Reese Smith Jr. Field • Murfreesboro, TN	L 1–2	Seibert (4-2)	Beaird (2-2)	None	CUSA.TV	510	30–14	14–7
May 3	Texas–Rio Grande Valley		Roadrunner Field • San Antonio, TX	L 1–12	Ariza (2-1)	Beaird (2-3)	None	CUSA.TV	282	30–15	
May 6	Marshall		Roadrunner Field • San Antonio, TX	W 6–3	Owens (3-1)	Purnell (5-4)	Miller (1)	CUSA.TV	328	31–15	15–7
May 7	Marshall		Roadrunner Field • San Antonio, TX	L 6–9	Copen (3-3)	Malone (7-2)	Capuano (2)	CUSA.TV	330	31–16	15–8
May 8	Marshall		Roadrunner Field • San Antonio, TX	W 5–4	Miller (3-3)	Capuano (2-6)	None	CUSA.TV	241	32–16	16–8
May 13	at No. 14 Southern Miss		Pete Taylor Park • Hattiesburg, MS	W 8–7	Garza (3-0)	Hall (7-2)	Malone (2)	ESPN+	4,593	33–16	17–8
May 14	at No. 14 Southern Miss		Pete Taylor Park • Hattiesburg, MS	L 3–8	Riggins (6-4)	Quiroga (1-4)	Rogers (5)	ESPN+	4,465	33–17	17–9
May 15	at No. 14 Southern Miss		Pete Taylor Park • Hattiesburg, MS	L 5–9	Storm (2-0)	Malone (7-3)	Harper (10)	ESPN+	4,461	33–18	17–10
May 19	UAB		Roadrunner Field • San Antonio, TX	L 7–18	O'Clair (2-3)	Garza (3-1)	None	CUSA.TV	232	33–19	17–11
May 20	UAB		Roadrunner Field • San Antonio, TX	W 7–2	Malone (8-3)	Sewell (1-1)	None	CUSA.TV	402	34–19	18–11
May 21	UAB		Roadrunner Field • San Antonio, TX	W 12–2^{7}	Quiroga (2-4)	Walton (6-5)	None	CUSA.TV	235	35–19	19–11

Postseason (3–1)

C-USA Tournament (3–1)
Date	Opponent	(Seed)/Rank	Site/stadium	Score	Win	Loss	Save	TV	Attendance	Overall record	Tournament record
May 24	vs. (4) Florida Atlantic	(5)	Pete Taylor Park • Hattiesburg, MS	W 6–4	Malone (9-3)	Martzolf (2-2)	None	ESPN+		36–19	1–0
May 27	vs. (1)/No. 14 Southern Miss	(5)	Pete Taylor Park • Hattiesburg, MS	W 7–6	Miller (4-3)	Harper (2-2)	None	ESPN+	3,379	37–19	2–0
May 28	vs. (1)/No. 14 Southern Miss	(5)	Pete Taylor Park • Hattiesburg, MS	W 11–2	Garza (4-1)	Adams (2-2)	None	ESPN+		38–19	3–0
May 29	vs. (2) Louisiana Tech	(5)	Pete Taylor Park • Hattiesburg, MS	L 8–9	Crigger (6-2)	Owens (3-2)	None	CBSSN	3,140	38–20	3–1

Legend: = Win = Loss = Cancelled/Postponed

Schedule source:

*Rankings are based on the team's current ranking in the D1Baseball poll.

== Postseason ==
Accolade	Recipient	Reference
First Team All-CUSA team	Luke Malone, P	
Second Team All-CUSA team	Leyton Barry, INF; Jonathan Tapia, U	
Freshman All-CUSA team	Matt King, INF	
