= 2022 Louisiana Tech Bulldogs baseball team =

Baseball team season

2022 Louisiana Tech Bulldogs baseball

C-USA Tournament champion

NCAA Austin Regional appearance, 1–2
- Conference: Conference USA
- Record: 43–21 (20–10 C-USA)
- Head coach: Lane Burroughs
- Assistant coaches: Mitch Gaspard; Cooper Fouts; Matt Miller
- Home stadium: J. C. Love Field at Pat Patterson Park

2022 Conference USA baseball standings
	Conf.						Overall
Team	W		L		T	PCT	W		L		T	PCT
No. 15 Southern Miss ‍†‍‍^{y}	23	–	7	–	0	.767	43	–	16	–	0	.729
Louisiana Tech ‍‍‡‍^{y}	20	–	10	–	0	.667	42	–	19	–	0	.689
Old Dominion ‍‍‍	19	–	11	–	0	.633	41	–	17	–	0	.707
Florida Atlantic ‍‍‍	19	–	11	–	0	.633	35	–	23	–	0	.603
UTSA ‍‍‍	19	–	11	–	0	.633	38	–	20	–	0	.655
Middle Tennessee ‍‍‍	17	–	13	–	0	.567	29	–	26	–	0	.527
Charlotte ‍‍‍	17	–	13	–	0	.567	36	–	22	–	0	.621
UAB ‍‍‍	13	–	17	–	0	.433	31	–	25	–	0	.554
Rice ‍‍‍	9	–	21	–	0	.300	17	–	39	–	0	.304
Marshall ‍‍‍	9	–	21	–	0	.300	20	–	34	–	1	.373
FIU ‍‍‍	8	–	22	–	0	.267	16	–	34	–	0	.320
Western Kentucky ‍‍‍	7	–	23	–	0	.233	18	–	36	–	0	.333
† – Conference champion ‡ – Tournament champion y – Invited to the NCAA tournament Rankings from D1Baseball

The 2022 Louisiana Tech Bulldogs baseball team represented Louisiana Tech University in the sport of baseball for the 2022 college baseball season. The Bulldogs competed in Division I of the National Collegiate Athletic Association (NCAA) and in Conference USA West Division. They played their home games at J. C. Love Field at Pat Patterson Park, on the university's Ruston campus. The team was coached by Lane Burroughs, who was in his sixth season with the Bulldogs.

== Preseason ==
=== C-USA media poll ===
The Conference USA preseason poll was released on February 16, 2022, with the Bulldogs predicted to finish in second place in the conference.

Media poll
Predicted finish	Team	1st Place Votes
1	Southern Miss	6
2	Louisiana Tech	2
3	Old Dominion	1
4	Charlotte	4
5	Florida Atlantic	-
6	UTSA	-
7	FIU	1
8	Rice	-
9	Western Kentucky	-
10	Middle Tennessee	-
11	UAB	-
12	Marshall	-

=== Preseason CUSA Pitcher of the Year ===
- Jonathan Fincher – Redshirt Junior, Left-Handed Pitcher

=== Preseason All-CUSA team ===
- Taylor Young – Infielder
- Jonathan Fincher – Pitcher
- Jarrett Whorf – Pitcher

== Personnel ==
2022 Louisiana Tech Bulldogs baseball team
Players
Coaches

#	Pos.	Name	B/T	Height	Weight	Year	Home town
1	INF	Colton Hegwood	L/R	5 ft 11 in (1.8 m)	170 lb (77 kg)	Fr	Brandon, Mississippi
2	INF	Thaxton Berch	R/R	5 ft 10 in (1.78 m)	170 lb (77 kg)	Fr	Jackson, Mississippi
3	RHP	Ryan Jennings	R/R	6 ft 0 in (1.83 m)	190 lb (86 kg)	Sr	New Braunfels, Texas
4	LHP	Cade Gibson (redshirt)	L/L	6 ft 2 in (1.88 m)	195 lb (88 kg)	Sr	Ruston, Louisiana
5	OF	Cole McConnell	L/L	6 ft 1 in (1.85 m)	200 lb (91 kg)	So	Beaumont, Texas
6	OF	Adarius Myers (redshirt)	R/R	5 ft 10 in (1.78 m)	185 lb (84 kg)	So	Seminary, Mississippi
8	INF	Taylor Young	R/R	5 ft 9 in (1.75 m)	170 lb (77 kg)	Sr	West Monroe, Louisiana
10	INF	Logan McLeod	R/R	5 ft 10 in (1.78 m)	185 lb (84 kg)	So	Sour Lake, Texas
11	C	Jorge Corona	R/R	6 ft 2 in (1.88 m)	190 lb (86 kg)	So	Miami, Florida
12	OF	Philip Matulia	L/R	6 ft 2 in (1.88 m)	205 lb (93 kg)	Jr	Houston, Texas
13	INF	Jeffrey Ince	R/R	6 ft 0 in (1.83 m)	185 lb (84 kg)	Fr	Brandon, Mississippi
14	INF	Walker Burchfield	R/R	6 ft 2 in (1.88 m)	235 lb (107 kg)	Jr	Clinton, Mississippi
15	INF	Riggs Easterling	R/R	5 ft 9 in (1.75 m)	170 lb (77 kg)	So	Shreveport, Louisiana
16	RHP	Cade Hodges	R/R	6 ft 1 in (1.85 m)	215 lb (98 kg)	Jr	Brookhaven, Mississippi
17	INF	Slade Netterville	R/R	5 ft 9 in (1.75 m)	175 lb (79 kg)	Fr	Shreveport, Louisiana
18	OF	Bryce Wallace (redshirt)	L/L	6 ft 2 in (1.88 m)	185 lb (84 kg)	So	Bastrop, Louisiana
19	C	Jackson Slaughter (redshirt)	R/R	6 ft 0 in (1.83 m)	190 lb (86 kg)	Fr	El Dorado Hills, California
20	OF	Jackson Lancaster	L/L	6 ft 1 in (1.85 m)	195 lb (88 kg)	Sr	Corinth, Mississippi
21	INF	Wade Elliott	R/R	6 ft 1 in (1.85 m)	195 lb (88 kg)	So	Edmond, Oklahoma
25	RHP	Jarret Whorff	R/R	6 ft 3 in (1.91 m)	195 lb (88 kg)	Sr	Winnsboro, Texas
26	RHP	Kyle Crigger	R/R	6 ft 2 in (1.88 m)	180 lb (82 kg)	Sr	Corinth, Mississippi
28	LHP	Caden Copeland	L/L	6 ft 2 in (1.88 m)	185 lb (84 kg)	Fr	Midlothian, Texas
29	LHP	Bryson Bales (redshirt)	L/L	6 ft 2 in (1.88 m)	175 lb (79 kg)	So	Round Rock, Texas
30	OF	Steele Netterville	R/R	6 ft 2 in (1.88 m)	230 lb (104 kg)	Sr	Shreveport, Louisiana
31	P	Anthony Giannette	R/R	6 ft 0 in (1.83 m)	187 lb (85 kg)	Fr	Spring, Texas
32	C	Kyle Hasler	R/R	6 ft 0 in (1.83 m)	190 lb (86 kg)	So	Chandler, Arizona
33	C	Baylor Cobb	L/R	6 ft 2 in (1.88 m)	195 lb (88 kg)	Fr	Winnsboro, Louisiana
34	RHP	Tanner Knight	R/R	6 ft 3 in (1.91 m)	190 lb (86 kg)	Jr	Eupora, Mississippi
35	INF	Kyle Walker	R/R	5 ft 9 in (1.75 m)	185 lb (84 kg)	Fr	New Orleans, Louisiana
36	RHP	Greg Martinez	R/R	6 ft 3 in (1.91 m)	205 lb (93 kg)	So	Southwest Ranches, Florida
37	OF	Jack Cue	R/R	6 ft 2 in (1.88 m)	190 lb (86 kg)	Fr	Southwest Ranches, Florida
38	RHP	Landon Tomkins	R/R	6 ft 3 in (1.91 m)	200 lb (91 kg)	Jr	Brandon, Mississippi
39	LHP	Ryan Harland	L/L	5 ft 8 in (1.73 m)	185 lb (84 kg)	Fr	Baton Rouge, Louisiana
40	OF	Jack Parks	R/R	6 ft 4 in (1.93 m)	205 lb (93 kg)	Fr	Ruston, Louisiana
42	OF	Jackson Walker	R/R	6 ft 1 in (1.85 m)	205 lb (93 kg)	Fr	Shreveport, Louisiana
44	INF	Ben Brantley	L/R	6 ft 4 in (1.93 m)	205 lb (93 kg)	So	Hernando, Mississippi
47	LHP	Jonathan Fincher (redshirt)	L/L	6 ft 3 in (1.91 m)	240 lb (109 kg)	Jr	Shreveport, Louisiana
48	OF	Jesse Boydstun	R/R	6 ft 1 in (1.85 m)	205 lb (93 kg)	So	Louisville, Mississippi
	RHP	Mason Kelly (redshirt)	R/R	6 ft 1 in (1.85 m)	200 lb (91 kg)	Fr	Bullard, Texas
	INF	Connor Mulhern	R/R	6 ft 0 in (1.83 m)	195 lb (88 kg)	Fr	Rayville, Louisiana

Head coach

Lane Burroughs (Mississippi College)

Assistant coach(es)

Mitch Gaspard (Southwestern Louisiana)
Cooper Fouts (Texas Tech)
Matt Miller (Louisiana Tech)

Legend

- (C) Team captain
- (S) Suspended
- (I) Ineligible
- Injured
- Current redshirt

Roster
Last update: 25 July 2022

== Schedule and results ==
2022 Louisiana Tech Bulldogs baseball game log
Regular season (38–18)

February (5–2)
Date	Opponent	Rank	Site/stadium	Score	Win	Loss	Save	TV	Attendance	Overall record	C-USA record
Feb. 18	Wichita State		JC Love Field at Pat Patterson Park • Ruston, LA	W 7–3	Fincher (1–0)	McDonough (0–1)	Gibson (1)	CUSA.TV	2,247	1–0	
Feb. 19	Wichita State		J. C. Love Field at Pat Patterson Park • Ruston, LA	W 9–6	Crigger (1–0)	Adler (0–1)	None	CUSA.TV	2,307	2–0	
Feb. 20	Wichita State		J. C. Love Field at Pat Patterson Park • Ruston, LA	'W; 5–3	Martinez (1–0)	Stevens (0–1)	Crigger (1)	CUSA.TV	2,261	3–0	
Feb. 23	No. 8 LSU		J. C. Love Field at Pat Patterson Park • Ruston, LA	W 11–6	Gibson (1–0)	Cooper (0–1)	None	ESPN+	2,529	4–0	
Feb. 25	Tulane		J. C. Love Field at Pat Patterson Park • Ruston, LA	W 6–1	Fincher (2–0)	Hoffman (0–1)	None	CUSA.TV	2,256	5–0	
Feb. 27	Tulane		J. C. Love Field at Pat Patterson Park • Ruston, LA	L 1–4^{7}	Carmouche (2–0)	Jennings (0–1)	None	CUSA.TV	2,110	5–1	
Feb. 27	Tulane		J. C. Love Field at Pat Patterson Park • Ruston, LA	L 5–13^{7}	Massey (1–0)	Whorff (0–1)	None	CUSA.TV	2,304	5–2	

March (13–5)
Date	Opponent	Rank	Site/stadium	Score	Win	Loss	Save	TV	Attendance	Overall record	C-USA record
Mar. 1	at Nicholls		Ben Meyer Diamond at Ray E. Didier Field • Thibodaux, LA	L 4–5	Vial Jr. (1–0)	Gibson (1-1)	Evans (1)		225	5–3	
Mar. 2	at Southeastern Louisiana		Pat Kenelly Diamond at Alumni Field • Hammond, LA	L 3–4	Reynolds (1-1)	Hodges (0–1)	Trahan (1)	ESPN+	1,218	5–4	
Mar. 4	at McNeese State		Joe Miller Ballpark • Lake Charles, LA	W 21–5	Fincher (3–0)	Stone (1-1)	None		851	6–4	
Mar. 5	at McNeese State		Joe Miller Ballpark • Lake Charles, LA	W 11–3	Tomkins (1–0)	Rogers (2–1)	None		820	7–4	
Mar. 6	at McNeese State		Joe Miller Ballpark • Lake Charles, LA	L 2–5	Shadrick (1–0)	Whorff (0–2)	Foster (4)		770	7–5	
Mar. 8	Louisiana		J. C. Love Field at Pat Patterson Park • Ruston, LA	Game postponed							
Mar. 9	Southeastern Louisiana		J. C. Love Field at Pat Patterson Park • Ruston, LA	W 13–1	Giannette (1–0)	Lauve (0–2)	None	CUSA.TV	2,229	8–5	
Mar. 11	Houston Baptist		J. C. Love Field at Pat Patterson Park • Ruston, LA	W 22–2	Fincher (4–0)	Tinker (0–3)	None	CUSA.TV	2,237	9–5	
Mar. 12	Houston Baptist		J. C. Love Field at Pat Patterson Park • Ruston, LA	W 12–3	Jennings (1-1)	Burch (0–2)	None	CUSA.TV	2,327	10–5	
Mar. 13	Houston Baptist		J. C. Love Field at Pat Patterson Park • Ruston, LA	W 6–0	Whorff (1–2)	Ripoll (1–2)	None	CUSA.TV	2,257	11–5	
Mar. 15	at Louisiana–Monroe		Warhawk Field • Monroe, LA	W 8–4	Martinez (2–0)	Shuffler (0–2)	None	ESPN+	1,574	12–5	
Mar. 18	at UTSA		Roadrunner Field • San Antonio, TX	W 6–5	Gibson (2–1)	Miller (1-1)	Crigger (2)	CUSA.TV	782	13–5	1–0
Mar. 19	at UTSA		Roadrunner Field • San Antonio, TX	W 5–4	Tomkins (2–0)	Shafer (0–1)	Crigger (3)	CUSA.TV	553	14–5	2–0
Mar. 20	at UTSA		Roadrunner Field • San Antonio, TX	L 3–13^{8}	Owens (1-1)	Whorff (1–3)	None	CUSA.TV	134	14–6	2–1
Mar. 22	at No. 21 LSU		Alex Box Stadium, Skip Bertman Field • Baton Rouge, LA	Game postponed							
Mar. 23	at No. 21 LSU		Alex Box Stadium, Skip Bertman Field • Baton Rouge, LA	W 7–6^{12}	Crigger (2–1)	Floyd (3–2)	None	SECN+	10,314	15–6	
Mar. 25	FIU		J. C. Love Field at Pat Patterson Park • Ruston, LA	W 12–2	Fincher (5–0)	Cabarcas (2-2)	Giannette (1)	CUSA.TV	2,226	16–6	3–1
Mar. 26	FIU		J. C. Love Field at Pat Patterson Park • Ruston, LA	W 12–0	Gibson (3–0)	Pridgen (1–3)	None	CUSA.TV	2,343	17–6	4–1
Mar. 27	FIU		J. C. Love Field at Pat Patterson Park • Ruston, LA	W 13–2^{8}	Whorff (2–3)	Lequerica (1-1)	None	CUSA.TV	2,217	18–6	5–1
Mar. 29	No. 19 Dallas Baptist		J. C. Love Field at Pat Patterson Park • Ruston, LA	L 4–7	Heaton (1-1)	Martinez (2–1)	Arnold (5)	CUSA.TV	2,354	18–7	

April (11–8)
Date	Opponent	Rank	Site/stadium	Score	Win	Loss	Save	TV	Attendance	Overall record	C-USA record
Apr. 1	at Southern Miss		Pete Taylor Park • Hattiesburg, MS	L 2–8	Hall (4–0)	Fincher (5–1)	None	ESPN+	5,469	18–8	5–2
Apr. 2	at Southern Miss		Pete Taylor Park • Hattiesburg, MS	W 4–2	Gibson (4–0)	Riggins (3–2)	Crigger (4)	ESPN+	5,706	19–8	6–2
Apr. 3	at Southern Miss		Pete Taylor Park • Hattiesburg, MS	L 0–8	Waldrep (3–1)	Whorff (2–4)	None	ESPN+	5,138	19–9	6–3
Apr. 5	Louisiana		J. C. Love Field at Pat Patterson Park • Ruston, LA	W 7–3	Tomkins (3–0)	Bonds (2-2)	Crigger (5)	CUSA.TV	2,439	20–9	
Apr. 6	Louisiana		J. C. Love Field at Pat Patterson Park • Ruston, LA	L 6–8	Rawls (1–0)	Whorff (2–5)	None	CUSA.TV	2,606	20–10	
Apr. 8	Rice		J. C. Love Field at Pat Patterson Park • Ruston, LA	W 5–3	Crigger (3–1)	Deskins (1–5)	None	CUSA.TV	2,463	21–10	7–3
Apr. 9	Rice		J. C. Love Field at Pat Patterson Park • Ruston, LA	W 9–3	Jennings (2–1)	Zaskoda (0–1)	None	CUSA.TV	2,531	22–10	8–3
Apr. 10	Rice		J. C. Love Field at Pat Patterson Park • Ruston, LA	W 3–1	Fincher (6–1)	Burbank (1–4)	Crigger (6)	CUSA.TV	2,384	23–10	9–3
Apr. 12	Northwestern State		J. C. Love Field at Pat Patterson Park • Ruston, LA	Game postponed							
Apr. 15	at Marshall		Kennedy Center Field • Huntington, WV	L 9–10	Capuano (2–5)	Lancaster (0–1)	None		49	23–11	9–4
Apr. 16	at Marshall		Kennedy Center Field • Huntington, WV	W 7–4	Harland (1–0)	Agemy (2–1)	None		78	24–11	10–4
Apr. 16	at Marshall		Kennedy Center Field • Huntington, WV	W 11–5	Whorff (3–5)	Lyles (2–1)	None		78	25–11	11–4
Apr. 19	Little Rock		J. C. Love Field at Pat Patterson Park • Ruston, LA	W 10–0	Martinez (3–1)	Brewer (2–1)	None	CUSA.TV	2,186	26–11	
Apr. 20	Northwestern State		J. C. Love Field at Pat Patterson Park • Ruston, LA	W 6–4	Whorff (4–5)	Prestwich (0–3)	Crigger (7)	CUSA.TV	2,499	27–11	
Apr. 22	Middle Tennessee		J. C. Love Field at Pat Patterson Park • Ruston, LA	L 3–7	Keenan (4–3)	Gibson (4–1)	None	CUSA.TV	2,755	27–12	11–5
Apr. 23	Middle Tennessee		J. C. Love Field at Pat Patterson Park • Ruston, LA	W 4–2	Jennings (3–1)	Wigginton (5–3)	Crigger (8)	CUSA.TV	2,494	28–12	12–5
Apr. 24	Middle Tennessee		J. C. Love Field at Pat Patterson Park • Ruston, LA	L 3–6^{12}	Seibert (3–2)	Crigger (3–2)	None	CUSA.TV	2,259	28–13	12–6
Apr. 27	at Little Rock		Gary Hogan Field • Little Rock, AR	L 7–8	Smallwood (4–3)	Whorff (4–6)	None		115	28–14	
Apr. 29	at Old Dominion		Bud Metheny Baseball Complex • Norfolk, VA	L 0–5	Morgan (0–5)	Gibson (4–3)	None	ESPN+	492	28–15	12–7
Apr. 30	at Old Dominion		Bud Metheny Baseball Complex • Norfolk, VA	W 10–5	Harland (2–0)	Dean (2-2)	None	CUSA.TV	412	29–15	13–7

May (9–3)
Date	Opponent	Rank	Site/stadium	Score	Win	Loss	Save	TV	Attendance	Overall record	C-USA record
May 1	at Old Dominion		Bud Metheny Baseball Complex • Norfolk, VA	W 8–4	Tomkins (4–0)	Gertner (4-4)	None	CUSA.TV	664	30–15	14–7
May 3	Louisiana–Monroe		J. C. Love Field at Pat Patterson Park • Ruston, LA	W 11–5	Harland (3–0)	Robinson (1-1)	None	CUSA.TV	2,512	31–15	
May 4	at Northwestern State		H. Alvin Brown–C. C. Stroud Field • Natchitoches, LA	W 4–3	Knight (1–0)	Taylor (2–1)	Crigger (10)		1,208	32–15	
May 6	Florida Atlantic		J. C. Love Field at Pat Patterson Park • Ruston, LA	L 2–10	Cooley (7–3)	Gibson (4–3)	None	CUSA.TV	2,290	32–16	14–8
May 7	Florida Atlantic		J. C. Love Field at Pat Patterson Park • Ruston, LA	W 11–6	Jennings (4–1)	DeGusipe (0–2)	None	CUSA.TV	2,360	33–16	15–8
May 8	Florida Atlantic		J. C. Love Field at Pat Patterson Park • Ruston, LA	L 2–5	Burnham (6–0)	Fincher (6–2)	Wegielnik (6)	CUSA.TV	2,221	33–17	15–9
May 13	Western Kentucky		J. C. Love Field at Pat Patterson Park • Ruston, LA	W 16–4	Gibson (5–3)	Terbrak (7–4)	None	CUSA.TV	2,362	34–17	16–9
May 14	Western Kentucky		J. C. Love Field at Pat Patterson Park • Ruston, LA	W 7–2	Jennings (5–1)	Stofel (0–7)	None	CUSA.TV	2,388	35–17	17–9
May 15	Western Kentucky		J. C. Love Field at Pat Patterson Park • Ruston, LA	W 11–2	Whorff (5–6)	Bergeron (2–3)	None	CUSA.TV	2,340	36–17	18–9
May 19	at Charlotte		Robert and Mariam Hayes Stadium • Charlotte, NC	L 3–11	Giesting (7–4)	Gibson (5–4)	None	ESPN+	674	36–18	18–10
May 20	at Charlotte		Robert and Mariam Hayes Stadium • Charlotte, NC	W 8–3	Crigger (4–2)	Kramer (3–2)	None	ESPN+	773	37–18	19–10
May 21	at Charlotte		Robert and Mariam Hayes Stadium • Charlotte, NC	W 14–5^{8}	Fincher (7–2)	Lancaster (4–2)	None	ESPN+	787	38–18	20–10

Postseason (5–3)

C-USA Tournament (4–1)
Date	Opponent	(Seed)/Rank	Site/stadium	Score	Win	Loss	Save	TV	Attendance	Overall record	Tournament record
May 25	vs. (7) Charlotte	(2)	Pete Taylor Park • Hattiesburg, MS	W 4–0	Gibson (6–4)	Michelson (1-1)	None	ESPN+		39–18	1–0
May 26	vs. (3) Old Dominion	(2)	Pete Taylor Park • Hattiesburg, MS	W 7–2	Jennings (6–1)	Pantos (6–1)	None	ESPN+		40–18	2–0
May 28	vs. (3) Old Dominion	(2)	Pete Taylor Park • Hattiesburg, MS	L 6–9^{13}	Hartline (2–1)	Whorff (5–7)	None	ESPN+		40–19	2–1
May 28	vs. (3) Old Dominion	(2)	Pete Taylor Park • Hattiesburg, MS	W 8–7	Crigger (5–2)	Pantos (6–2)	None	ESPN+	2,873	41–19	3–1
May 29	vs. (5) UTSA	(2)	Pete Taylor Park • Hattiesburg, MS	W 9–8	Crigger (6–2)	Owens (3–2)	None	CBSSN	3,140	42–19	4–1

NCAA Austin Regional (1–2)
Date	Opponent	(Seed)/Rank	Site/stadium	Score	Win	Loss	Save	TV	Attendance	Overall record	Tournament record
Jun. 3	vs. (3) Dallas Baptist	(2)	UFCU Disch-Falk Field • Austin, TX	W 12–5	Fincher (8–2)	Hall (3-3)	Martinez (1)	ESPN+	7,309	43–19	1–0
Jun. 4	at (1)/No. 16 Texas	(2)	UFCU Disch-Falk Field • Austin, TX	L 2–5	Stevens (6-6)	Crigger (6–3)	None	LHN/ESPN+	8,502	43–20	1–1
Jun. 5	vs. (4) Air Force	(2)	UFCU Disch-Falk Field • Austin, TX	L 7–9	Dornak (1–0)	Crigger (6–4)	None	ESPN+	7,340	43–21	1–2

Legend: = Win = Loss = Cancelled

Schedule source:

*Rankings are based on the team's current ranking in the D1Baseball poll.

== Austin Regional ==
Austin Regional Teams
(1) Texas Longhorns	(2) Louisiana Tech Bulldogs	(3) Dallas Baptist Patriots	(4) Air Force Falcons

First Round
1	No. 16 Texas	11
4	Air Force	3
3	Dallas Baptist	5
2	Louisiana Tech	12
Lower round 1
4	Air Force	5
3	Dallas Baptist	1

Semi-Finals
1	No. 16 Texas	5
2	Louisiana Tech	2
Lower final
4	Air Force	9
2	Louisiana Tech	7

Finals
1	No. 16 Texas	10	-
4	Air Force	1	-

== Postseason ==
Accolade	Recipient	Reference
ABCA/Rawlings First Team All-American team	Taylor Young, INF	
Collegiate Baseball Freshman All-American team	Ryan Harland, P	
C-USA Defensive Player of the Year	Logan McLeod, INF	
First Team All-CUSA team	Taylor Young, INF; Cole McConnell, OF; Kyle Crigger, P	
Second Team All-CUSA team	Jorge Corona, C Cade Gibson, P Ryan Harland, P	
Freshman All-CUSA team	Ryan Harland, P	

== Rankings ==
Ranking movements Legend: ██ Increase in ranking ██ Decrease in ranking — = Not ranked RV = Received votes
	Week																
Poll	Pre	1	2	3	4	5	6	7	8	9	10	11	12	13	14	15	Final
Coaches'	RV	RV*	—	—	—	—	RV	—	RV	—	—	—	—	—	—	RV	—
Baseball America	—	—	—	—	—	—	—	—	—	—	—	—	—	—	—	—	—
Collegiate Baseball^	15	15	25	—	—	—	23	—	—	—	—	—	—	—	—	—	—
NCBWA†	32	30	30	—	—	—	—	—	—	—	—	—	—	—	—	—	—
D1Baseball	—	—	—	—	—	—	—	—	—	—	—	—	—	—	—	—	—

^ Collegiate Baseball ranked 40 teams in their preseason poll, but only ranked 30 teams weekly during the season.
† NCBWA ranks 30 teams in their preseason poll, but only ranks 25 teams weekly during the season.
* A new poll was not released for this week, so for comparison purposes, the previous week's ranking is inserted in this week's slot.
