= 2022 Florida Atlantic Owls baseball team =

American college baseball season

2022 Florida Atlantic Owls baseball
- Conference: Conference USA
- Record: 35-23 (19-11 C-USA)
- Head coach: John McCormack
- Assistant coach: Greg Mamula; Brady Kirkpatrick; Michael Cleary
- Home stadium: FAU Baseball Stadium

2022 Conference USA baseball standings
	Conf.						Overall
Team	W		L		T	PCT	W		L		T	PCT
No. 15 Southern Miss ‍†‍‍^{y}	23	–	7	–	0	.767	43	–	16	–	0	.729
Louisiana Tech ‍‍‡‍^{y}	20	–	10	–	0	.667	42	–	19	–	0	.689
Old Dominion ‍‍‍	19	–	11	–	0	.633	41	–	17	–	0	.707
Florida Atlantic ‍‍‍	19	–	11	–	0	.633	35	–	23	–	0	.603
UTSA ‍‍‍	19	–	11	–	0	.633	38	–	20	–	0	.655
Middle Tennessee ‍‍‍	17	–	13	–	0	.567	29	–	26	–	0	.527
Charlotte ‍‍‍	17	–	13	–	0	.567	36	–	22	–	0	.621
UAB ‍‍‍	13	–	17	–	0	.433	31	–	25	–	0	.554
Rice ‍‍‍	9	–	21	–	0	.300	17	–	39	–	0	.304
Marshall ‍‍‍	9	–	21	–	0	.300	20	–	34	–	1	.373
FIU ‍‍‍	8	–	22	–	0	.267	16	–	34	–	0	.320
Western Kentucky ‍‍‍	7	–	23	–	0	.233	18	–	36	–	0	.333
† – Conference champion ‡ – Tournament champion y – Invited to the NCAA tournament Rankings from D1Baseball

The 2022 Florida Atlantic Owls baseball team represented Florida Atlantic University in the sport of baseball for the 2022 college baseball season. The Owls competed in Division I of the National Collegiate Athletic Association (NCAA) and Conference USA. They played their home games at FAU Baseball Stadium, on the university's Boca Raton campus. The team was coached by John McCormack, who was in his fourteenth season at Florida Atlantic.

== Previous season ==
The 2021 Owls finished 35–25 overall, and 18–14 in the conference. They lost to Old Dominion during the 2021 Conference USA baseball tournament.

== Preseason ==
=== C-USA media poll ===
The Conference USA preseason poll was released on February 16, 2022, with the Owls predicted to finish in fifth place.

Media poll
Predicted finish	Team	1st Place Votes
1	Southern Miss	6
2	LA Tech	2
3	Old Dominion	1
4	Charlotte	2
5	Florida Atlantic	-
6	UTSA	-
7	FIU	1
8	Rice	-
9	WKU	-
10	Middle Tennessee	-
11	UAB	-
12	Marshall	-

=== Preseason All-CUSA teams ===
- Hunter Cooley – Starting Pitcher

== Personnel ==
2022 Florida Atlantic Owls baseball team
Players
Coaches

#	Pos.	Name	B/T	Height	Weight	Year	Home town
1	INF	Armando Albert	L/R	5 ft 11 in (1.8 m)	150 lb (68 kg)	So	Plantation, Florida
2	RHP	Jacob Josey (redshirt)	R/R	6 ft 1 in (1.85 m)	185 lb (84 kg)	Sr	Ellenton, Florida
4	INF	Joey Slattery	L/R	6 ft 0 in (1.83 m)	185 lb (84 kg)	Fr	Charlotte, North Carolina
5	OF	Jalen DeBose	R/R	6 ft 0 in (1.83 m)	160 lb (73 kg)	So	Sanford, Florida
6	OF	Jack Clarke	L/L	6 ft 0 in (1.83 m)	190 lb (86 kg)	Fr	Miami Shores, Florida
7	INF	Dom Presto	R/R	5 ft 11 in (1.8 m)	185 lb (84 kg)	Fr	Palm Beach Gardens, Florida
8	OF	Dylan Goldstein	L/R	6 ft 0 in (1.83 m)	190 lb (86 kg)	So	Southwest Ranches, Florida
9	OF	Gabriel Rincones, Jr.	L/R	6 ft 4 in (1.93 m)	225 lb (102 kg)	So	Glenrothes, Scotland
10	C	John Schroeder	R/R	6 ft 1 in (1.85 m)	180 lb (82 kg)	Fr	Lakewood Ranch, Florida
12	INF	Nolan Schanuel	L/R	6 ft 3 in (1.91 m)	195 lb (88 kg)	So	Boynton Beach, Florida
13	INF	Steven Loden (redshirt)	L/R	6 ft 1 in (1.85 m)	205 lb (93 kg)	So	Lower Gwynedd, Pennsylvania
14	RHP	Brock Helverson (redshirt)	R/R	6 ft 3 in (1.91 m)	190 lb (86 kg)	Sr	Schwenksville, Pennsylvania
15	INF	Jackson Ross	R/R	6 ft 2 in (1.88 m)	200 lb (91 kg)	Jr	Lakeland, Florida
16	RHP	Robert Wegielnik (redshirt)	R/R	6 ft 0 in (1.83 m)	185 lb (84 kg)	So	Fort Myers, Florida
17	C	Shane Magrann	R/R	6 ft 3 in (1.91 m)	185 lb (84 kg)	Sr	Coconut Creek, Florida
18	LHP	Hunter Cooley	R/L	6 ft 3 in (1.91 m)	210 lb (95 kg)	Sr	Vero Beach, Florida
21	C	Daniel Tomasello	R/R	5 ft 11 in (1.8 m)	165 lb (75 kg)	So	Tampa, Florida
22	OF	Jake Millan	R/L	6 ft 2 in (1.88 m)	210 lb (95 kg)	Fr	Springbrook, Pennsylvania
23	RHP	Dawson Bell	R/L	6 ft 0 in (1.83 m)	195 lb (88 kg)	Fr	Wellington, Florida
24	OF	Mitchell Hartigan	L/R	5 ft 11 in (1.8 m)	180 lb (82 kg)	Jr	Jupiter, Florida
25	RHP	Braden Ostrander	R/R	6 ft 1 in (1.85 m)	205 lb (93 kg)	So	Melbourne, Florida
26	RHP	Bryce Braxton	R/R	6 ft 0 in (1.83 m)	215 lb (98 kg)	Fr	Dade City, Florida
27	OF	Tyler Kelder	R/R	6 ft 0 in (1.83 m)	210 lb (95 kg)	Gr	Kingston, New York
28	INF	Daulton Frank (redshirt)	R/R	5 ft 11 in (1.8 m)	175 lb (79 kg)	Fr	Loxahatchee, Florida
29	LHP	Evan Waterbor	L/L	6 ft 0 in (1.83 m)	190 lb (86 kg)	Jr	Trinity, Florida
31	RHP	Tibur Rivero	R/R	6 ft 0 in (1.83 m)	205 lb (93 kg)	So	Stuart, Florida
33	C	Nicholas Toney	R/R	6 ft 2 in (1.88 m)	210 lb (95 kg)	Sr	Royal Palm Beach, Florida
34	C	Caleb Pendleton	R/R	6 ft 2 in (1.88 m)	190 lb (86 kg)	So	Jensen Beach, Florida
35	RHP	Bryan Boully	R/R	6 ft 2 in (1.88 m)	205 lb (93 kg)	Fr	Dover, Florida
37	RHP	Dante Visconti	R/R	6 ft 5 in (1.96 m)	220 lb (100 kg)	So	St. Johns, Florida
40	LHP	Tyler Burnham	L/L	6 ft 4 in (1.93 m)	225 lb (102 kg)	Gr	New Brunswick, New Jersey
41	LHP	Marc Degusipe (redshirt)	L/L	6 ft 1 in (1.85 m)	225 lb (102 kg)	So	Tampa, Florida
42	LHP	Sam Drumheller	R/L	5 ft 9 in (1.75 m)	155 lb (70 kg)	So	Tampa, Florida
43	LHP	Max Martzolf	L/L	6 ft 1 in (1.85 m)	250 lb (113 kg)	Fr	Port St. Lucie, Florida
44	RHP	Nicholas Del Prado	R/R	6 ft 2 in (1.88 m)	235 lb (107 kg)	So	Miami, Florida
49	LHP	Tyler Rapf	R/L	6 ft 5 in (1.96 m)	210 lb (95 kg)	Fr	Point Pleasant, New Jersey
55	RHP	Hayden Compton	R/R	6 ft 5 in (1.96 m)	210 lb (95 kg)	So	Centerburg, Ohio

Head coach

John McCormack (Lynn)

Assistant coach(es)

Greg Mamula (St. Bonaventure)
Brady Kirkpatrick (San Diego)
Michael Cleary (Dayton)

Legend

- (C) Team captain
- (S) Suspended
- (I) Ineligible
- Injured
- Current redshirt

Roster
Last update: 31 July 2022

== Schedule and results ==
2022 Florida Atlantic Owls baseball game log
Regular season (34–21)

February (5–3)
Date	Opponent	Rank	Site/stadium	Score	Win	Loss	Save	TV	Attendance	Overall record	C-USA record
Feb. 18	Minnesota		FAU Baseball Stadium • Boca Raton, FL	**L** 1–9	Ireland (1–0)	**Josey** (0–1)	None		634	0–1	
Feb. 19	Minnesota		FAU Baseball Stadium • Boca Raton, FL	**W** 8–2	**Cooley** (1–0)	Maldonado (0–1)	None		541	1–1	
Fe. 20	Minnesota		FAU Baseball Stadium • Boca Raton, FL	**W** 13–4	**Waterbor** (1–0)	Holetz (0–1)	None		534	2–1	
Feb. 21	Minnesota		FAU Baseball Stadium • Boca Raton, FL	**W** 17–9	**Drumheller** (1–0)	Liffrig (0–1)	None		498	3–1	
Feb. 23	at No. 24 Miami		Alex Rodriguez Park at Mark Light Field • Coral Gables, FL	**L** 1–9	Ligon (1–0)	**DeGusipe** (0–1)	None		759	3–2	
Feb. 25	Delaware		FAU Baseball Stadium • Boca Raton, FL	**L** 5–8	Ludman (1–0)	**Josey** (0–2)	None		442	3–3	
Feb. 26	Delaware		FAU Baseball Stadium • Boca Raton, FL	**W** 8–3	**Cooley** (2–0)	Ledesma (0–1)	None		491	4–3	
Feb. 27	Delaware		FAU Baseball Stadium • Boca Raton, FL	**W** 5–1	**Rivero** (1–0)	Silan (0–1)	None		393	5–3	

March (11–7)
Date	Opponent	Rank	Site/stadium	Score	Win	Loss	Save	TV	Attendance	Overall record	C-USA record
Mar. 1	Michigan		FAU Baseball Stadium • Boca Raton, FL	**W** 5–1	**Wegielnik** (1–0)	Wood (0–1)	None		698	6–3	
Mar. 2	Michigan		FAU Baseball Stadium • Boca Raton, FL	**L** 13–20	Smith (1–0)	**Martzolf** (0–1)	None		557	6–4	
Mar. 4	Fordham		FAU Baseball Stadium • Boca Raton, FL	**W** 9–5	**Visconti** (1–0)	Quintal (0–2)	None		447	7–4	
Mar. 5	Fordham		FAU Baseball Stadium • Boca Raton, FL	**W** 15–10	**Rivero** (2–0)	Ey (0–3)	**Martzolf** (1)		528	8–4	
Mar. 6	Fordham		FAU Baseball Stadium • Boca Raton, FL	**W** 10–3	**Josey** (1–2)	Hughes (0–1)	None		447	9–4	
Mar. 8	vs. Seton Hall		Centennial Park • Port Charlotte, FL	**W** 19–6	**Del Prado** (1–0)	Shine (0–1)	None		217	10–4	
Mar. 11	Sacred Heart		FAU Baseball Stadium • Boca Raton, FL	**W** 6–3	**Cooley** (3–0)	C. Jeter (0–3)	**Wegielnik** (1)		414	11–4	
Mar. 12	Sacred Heart		FAU Baseball Stadium • Boca Raton, FL	**W** 15–10	**Rivero** (3–0)	LaMay (0–2)	None		336	12–4	
Mar. 13	Sacred Heart		FAU Baseball Stadium • Boca Raton, FL	**W** 11–1	**Burnham** (1–0)	Babuschak (0–3)	None		375	13–4	
Mar. 15	North Dakota State		FAU Baseball Stadium • Boca Raton, FL	**L** 3–12	Roehrich (2–0)	**Del Prado** (1–1)	None		334	13–5	
Mar. 18	at Southern Miss		Pete Taylor Park • Hattiesburg, MS	**L** 7–9	G. Ramsey (2–0)	**Visconti** (1–1)	None	ESPN+	4,543	13–6	0–1
Mar. 19	at Southern Miss		Pete Taylor Park • Hattiesburg, MS	**L** 4–6	L. Harper (1–1)	**Waterbor** (1–1)	G. Ramsey (2)	ESPN+	4,663	13–7	0–2
Mar. 20	at Southern Miss		Pete Taylor Park • Hattiesburg, MS	**W** 7–3	**Josey** (2–2)	Ethridge (1–3)	None	ESPN+	4,304	14–7	1–2
Mar. 23	Miami		FAU Baseball Stadium • Boca Raton, FL	**L** 1–7	Garland (3–1)	**Waterbor** (1–2)	Walters (5)		1,742	14–8	
Mar. 25	UTSA		FAU Baseball Stadium • Boca Raton, FL	**L** 4–5	Malone (3–0)	**Cooley** (3–1)	Shafer (2)		364	14–9	1–3
Mar. 26	UTSA		FAU Baseball Stadium • Boca Raton, FL	**W** 12–9	**Waterbor** (2–2)	Quiroga (1–3)	**Wegielnik** (2)		417	15–9	2–3
Mar. 27	UTSA		FAU Baseball Stadium • Boca Raton, FL	**W** 8–4	**Josey** (3–2)	S. Miller (1–3)	None		355	16–9	3–3
Mar. 29	at UCF		John Euliano Park • Orlando, FL	**L** 1–13	W. Saxton (2–0)	**B. Helverson** (0–1)	None		1,541	16–10	

April (11–7)
Date	Opponent	Rank	Site/stadium	Score	Win	Loss	Save	TV	Attendance	Overall record	C-USA record
Apr. 1	at Rice		Reckling Park • Houston, TX	**W** 9–4	**Cooley** (4–1)	Chandler (1–5)	None		1,702	17–10	4–3
Apr. 2	at Rice		Reckling Park • Houston, TX	**W** 6–5	**Drumheller** (2–0)	R. Garcia (1–1)	**Wegielnik** (3)		2,206	18–10	5–3
Apr. 3	at Rice		Reckling Park • Houston, TX	**W** 7–1	**Josey** (4–2)	Wood (0–1)	None		2,129	19–10	6–3
Apr. 5	UCF		FAU Baseball Stadium • Boca Raton, FL	**W** 5–3	**Wegielnik** (2–0)	Centala (1–3)	None		548	20–10	
Apr. 8	UAB		FAU Baseball Stadium • Boca Raton, FL	**L** 3–4	Reynolds (2–2)	**Cooley** (4–2)	Taylor (7)		385	20–11	6–4
Apr. 9	UAB		FAU Baseball Stadium • Boca Raton, FL	**L** 6–8	Ballard (5–1)	**Waterbor** (2–3)	Taylor (8)		399	20–12	6–5
Apr. 10	UAB		FAU Baseball Stadium • Boca Raton, FL	**W** 13–6	**Burnham** (2–0)	Walton (4–2)	None		495	21–12	7–5
Apr. 12	at No. 2 Miami		Alex Rodriguez Park • Coral Gables, FL	**L** 6–7	Gates (1–0)	**Wegielnik** (2–1)	Walters (11)		3,004	21–13	
Apr. 14	Western Kentucky		FAU Baseball Stadium • Boca Raton, FL	**W** 5–3	**Cooley** (5–2)	Terbrak (5–2)	None		385	22–13	8–5
Apr. 15	Western Kentucky		FAU Baseball Stadium • Boca Raton, FL	**W** 8–7	**Martzolf** (1–1)	Kates (3–4)	**Wegielnik** (4)		393	23–13	9–5
Apr. 16	Western Kentucky		FAU Baseball Stadium • Boca Raton, FL	**W** 9–3	**Burnham** (3–0)	Sinnard (0–2)	None		389	24–13	10–5
Apr. 19	at Florida Gulf Coast		Swanson Stadium • Fort Myers, FL	**L** 1–5	D. Batcher (1–0)	**Visconti** (1–2)	N. Love (1)		259	24–14	
Apr. 22	at Old Dominion		Bud Metheny Baseball Complex • Norfolk, VA	**L** 0–14	Morgan (4–0)	**Cooley** (5–3)	None		338	24–15	10–6
Apr. 23	at Old Dominion		Bud Metheny Baseball Complex • Norfolk, VA	**L** 7–11	Pantos (6–0)	**Josey** (4–3)	None		455	24–16	10–7
Apr. 24	at Old Dominion		Bud Metheny Baseball Complex • Norfolk, VA	**W** 5–4	**Burnham** (4–0)	Gomez (2–1)	**Wegielnik** (5)		299	25–16	11–7
Apr. 26	Florida Gulf Coast		FAU Baseball Stadium • Boca Raton, FL	**W** 8–7	**Martzolf** (2–1)	Batcher (1–1)	None		443	26–16	
Apr. 29	FIU		FAU Baseball Stadium • Boca Raton, FL	**W** 7–1	**Cooley** (6–3)	P. Pridgen (2–6)	None		639	27–16	12–7
Apr. 30	FIU		FAU Baseball Stadium • Boca Raton, FL	**L** 4–6	C. Lequerica (2–3)	**Josey** (4–4)	None		621	27–17	12–8

May (7–4)
Date	Opponent	Rank	Site/stadium	Score	Win	Loss	Save	TV	Attendance	Overall record	C-USA record
May 1	FIU		FAU Baseball Stadium • Boca Raton, FL	**W** 11–5	**Burnham** (5–0)	C. Santana (0–2)	None		492	28–17	13–8
May 6	at Louisiana Tech		J. C. Love Field at Pat Patterson Park • Ruston, LA	**W** 10–2	**Cooley** (7–3)	Gibson (4–3)	None		2,290	29–17	14–8
May 7	at Louisiana Tech		J. C. Love Field at Pat Patterson Park • Ruston, LA	**L** 6–11	Jennings (4–1)	**DeGusipe** (0–2)	None		2,360	29–18	14–9
May 8	at Louisiana Tech		J. C. Love Field at Pat Patterson Park • Ruston, LA	**W** 5–2	**Burnham** (6–0)	Fincher (6–2)	**Wegielnik** (6)		2,221	30–18	15–9
May 10	at Florida Gulf Coast		Swanson Stadium • Fort Myers, FL	**L** 2–7	N. Love (2–0)	**Waterbor** (2–4)	M. Miller (1)		118	30–19	
May 13	Charlotte		FAU Baseball Stadium • Boca Raton, FL	**L** 3–10	Giesting (6–4)	**Cooley** (7–4)	None		382	30–20	15–10
May 14	Charlotte		FAU Baseball Stadium • Boca Raton, FL	**W** 10–9^{15}	**Del Prado** (2–1)	Brooks (3–2)	None		430	31–20	16–10
May 15	Charlotte		FAU Baseball Stadium • Boca Raton, FL	**L** 4–14^{7}	Martinez (1–3)	**Burnham** (6–1)	None		370	31–21	16–11
May 19	at Marshall		Kennedy Center Field • Huntington, WV	**W** 8–6	**Cooley** (8–4)	Purnell (5–6)	**Wegielnik** (7)		89	32–21	17–11
May 20	at Marshall		Kennedy Center Field • Huntington, WV	**W** 14–12	**Drumheller** (3–0)	Davenport (2–3)	**Josey** (1)		99	33–21	18–11
May 21	at Marshall		Kennedy Center Field • Huntington, WV	**W** 11–1	**Del Prado** (3–1)	Addkison (1–3)	None		99	34–21	19–11

Postseason (1–2)

C-USA Tournament (1–2)
Date	Opponent	Seed	Site/stadium	Score	Win	Loss	Save	TV	Attendance	Overall record	Tournament record
May 26	vs. (5) UTSA	(4)	Pete Taylor Park • Hattiesburg, MS	**L** 4–5	Malone (9–3)	**Martzolf** (2–2)	None	ESPN+	0	34–22	0–1
May 26	vs. (8) UAB	(4)	Pete Taylor Park • Hattiesburg, MS	**W** 11–1^{7}	**Burnham** (7–1)	Harris (3–2)	None	ESPN+	0	35–22	1–1
May 27	vs. (1)/No. 14 Southern Miss	(4)	Pete Taylor Park • Hattiesburg, MS	**L** 0–5	Riggins (8–4)	**Josey** (4–5)	Rogers (6)	ESPN+	3,172	35–23	1–2

Legend: = Win = Loss = Cancelled
Bold = Florida Atlantic team member

Schedule source:

== Rankings ==
Ranking movements Legend: ██ Increase in ranking ██ Decrease in ranking — = Not ranked RV = Received votes
	Week																		
Poll	Pre	1	2	3	4	5	6	7	8	9	10	11	12	13	14	15	16	17	Final
Coaches'	—	—*	—	—	—	—	—	—	—	—	—	—	—	—	—	—	—*	—*	—
Baseball America	—	—	—	—	—	—	—	—	—	—	—	—	—	—	—	—	—*	—*	—
Collegiate Baseball^	RV	—	—	—	—	—	—	—	—	—	—	—	—	—	—	—	—	—	—
NCBWA†	—	—	—	—	RV	—	—	—	—	RV	—	—	—	—	—	—	—	—*	—
D1Baseball	—	—	—	—	—	—	—	—	—	—	—	—	—	—	—	—	—*	—*	—

^ Collegiate Baseball ranked 40 teams in their preseason poll, but only ranked 30 teams weekly during the season.
† NCBWA ranks 30 teams in their preseason poll, but only ranks 25 teams weekly during the season.
* A new poll was not released for this week, so for comparison purposes, the previous week's ranking is inserted in this week's slot.

== Awards ==
Weekly/End of Year awards
Player	Award	Date awarded	Ref.
Jalen DeBose	C-USA Hitter of the Week	February 21, 2022	
Gabriel Rincones Jr.	C-USA Hitter of the Week	April 11, 2022	
Nolan Schanuel	C-USA All-Academic Team	May 23, 2022	
Hunter Cooley	C-USA All-Academic Team	May 23, 2022	
Nicholas Del Prado	C-USA Pitcher of the Week	May 23, 2022	
Gabriel Rincones Jr.	C-USA Newcomer of the Year	May 24, 2022	
Gabriel Rincones Jr.	All-Conference First Team	May 24, 2022	
Nolan Schanuel	All-Conference First Team	May 24, 2022	
Hunter Cooley	All-Conference Second Team	May 24, 2022	
Dylan Goldstein	All-Conference Second Team	May 24, 2022	
