= 2022 Conference USA baseball tournament =

- Teams: 8
- Format: See below
- Finals site: Pete Taylor Park; Hattiesburg, Mississippi
- Champions: Louisiana Tech (1st title)
- Winning coach: Lane Burroughs (1st title)
- MVP: Taylor Young (Louisiana Tech)
- Television: ESPN+ (First round–semifinals); CBSSN (Championship game)

2022 Conference USA baseball standings
	Conf.						Overall
Team	W		L		T	PCT	W		L		T	PCT
No. 15 Southern Miss ‍†‍‍^{y}	23	–	7	–	0	.767	43	–	16	–	0	.729
Louisiana Tech ‍‍‡‍^{y}	20	–	10	–	0	.667	42	–	19	–	0	.689
Old Dominion ‍‍‍	19	–	11	–	0	.633	41	–	17	–	0	.707
Florida Atlantic ‍‍‍	19	–	11	–	0	.633	35	–	23	–	0	.603
UTSA ‍‍‍	19	–	11	–	0	.633	38	–	20	–	0	.655
Middle Tennessee ‍‍‍	17	–	13	–	0	.567	29	–	26	–	0	.527
Charlotte ‍‍‍	17	–	13	–	0	.567	36	–	22	–	0	.621
UAB ‍‍‍	13	–	17	–	0	.433	31	–	25	–	0	.554
Rice ‍‍‍	9	–	21	–	0	.300	17	–	39	–	0	.304
Marshall ‍‍‍	9	–	21	–	0	.300	20	–	34	–	1	.373
FIU ‍‍‍	8	–	22	–	0	.267	16	–	34	–	0	.320
Western Kentucky ‍‍‍	7	–	23	–	0	.233	18	–	36	–	0	.333
† – Conference champion ‡ – Tournament champion y – Invited to the NCAA tournament Rankings from D1Baseball

The 2022 Conference USA baseball tournament was held from May 25 through 29 at Pete Taylor Park in Hattiesburg, Mississippi. The annual tournament determined the tournament champion of Division I Conference USA in college baseball. The tournament champion, Louisiana Tech, then earned the conference's automatic bid to the 2022 NCAA Division I baseball tournament.

The tournament has been held every year since 1996, except for 2020, due to the COVID-19 pandemic. The Rice Owls has claimed seven championships, the most of any school, with the Owls latest win in 2017.

Louisiana Tech defeated UTSA, 9–8, in the championship game.

== Format and seeding ==
The tournament consisted of the top eight teams in regular season play. The format consisted of two double-elimination brackets, with a single-elimination championship game.

== Bracket and results ==
First round
1	Southern Miss	4
8	UAB	3
4	Florida Atlantic	4
5	UTSA	6
8	UAB	1
4	Florida Atlantic	11^{7}
3	Old Dominion	18^{7}
6	Middle Tennessee	7
2	Louisiana Tech	4
7	Charlotte	0
6	Middle Tennessee	0
7	Charlotte	22^{7}

Second round
1	Southern Miss	6
5	UTSA	7
4	Florida Atlantic	0
1	Southern Miss	5
3	Old Dominion	2
2	Louisiana Tech	7
7	Charlotte	4
3	Old Dominion	13

Semifinals
5	UTSA	11	-
1	Southern Miss	2	-
2	Louisiana Tech	6	8
3	Old Dominion	9^{13}	7

Finals
5	UTSA	8
2	Louisiana Tech	9

== Schedule ==
Game	Time*	Matchup^{#}	Score	Television
Wednesday, May 25
1	9:00 a.m.	No. 3 Old Dominion vs. No. 6 Middle Tennessee	18–7^{7}	ESPN+
2	12:30 p.m.	No. 2 Louisiana Tech vs. No. 7 Charlotte	4–0	ESPN+
3	9:20 p.m.	No. 1 Southern Miss vs. No. 8 UAB	4–3	ESPN+
Thursday, May 26
4	9:00 a.m.	No. 4 Florida Atlantic vs. No. 5 UTSA	4–6	ESPN+
5	12:30 p.m.	No. 6 Middle Tennessee vs. No. 7 Charlotte	0–22^{7}	ESPN+
6	4:00 p.m.	No. 2 Louisiana Tech vs No. 3 Old Dominion	7–2	ESPN+
7	7:30 p.m.	No. 8 UAB vs. No. 4 Florida Atlantic	1–11^{7}	ESPN+
Friday, May 27
8	10:00 a.m.	No. 1 Southern Miss vs. No. 5 UTSA	6–7	ESPN+
9	2:05 p.m.	No. 7 Charlotte vs. No. 3 Old Dominion	4–13	ESPN+
10	5:30 p.m.	No. 4 Florida Atlantic vs. No. 1 Southern Miss	0–5	ESPN+
Semifinals – Saturday, May 28
11	9:00 a.m.	No. 2 Louisiana Tech vs. No. 3 Old Dominion	6–9^{13}	ESPN+
12	12:30 p.m.	No. 5 UTSA vs. No. 1 Southern Miss	11–2	ESPN+
^13	4:00 p.m.	No. 2 Louisiana Tech vs No. 3 Old Dominion	8–7	ESPN+
Championship – Sunday, May 29
15	1:00 p.m.	No. 2 Louisiana Tech vs. No. 5 UTSA	9–8	CBS Sports Network
*Game times in CDT. # – Rankings denote tournament seed. ^if necessary

== Conference championship ==
Conference USA Championship
(5) UTSA Roadrunners	vs.	(2) Louisiana Tech Bulldogs

May 28, 2022, 1:06 p.m. (CDT) at Pete Taylor Park in Hattiesburg, Mississippi
Team	1	2	3	4	5	6	7	8	9	R	H	E
(5) UTSA	0	0	0	4	0	1	2	0	1	8	7	5
(2) Louisiana Tech	2	0	1	0	0	3	2	0	1	9	9	3
WP: Kyle Crigger (6–2) LP: Braylon Owens (3–2); Home runs: UTSA: Ryan Flores (1); Ian Bailey (1); LaTech: None; Attendance: 3,140

== All–Tournament Team ==
Position	Player	Team
C	Brock Gagliardi	Old Dominion
IF	Taylor Young (MVP)	Louisiana Tech
IF	Matt Coutney	Old Dominion
IF	Danny Lynch	Southern Miss
IF	Ryan Flores	UTSA
OF	Adarius Myers	Louisiana Tech
OF	Andy Garriola	Old Dominion
OF	Chase Keng	UTSA
DH/UT	Garrett Poston	UTSA
P	Kyle Crigger	Louisiana Tech
P	Ryan Jennings	Louisiana Tech
P	Hunter Riggins	Southern Miss
P	Luke Malone	UTSA
