= 2022 Southern Miss Golden Eagles baseball team =

Baseball team season

2022 Southern Miss Golden Eagles baseball

C-USA Regular season champions NCAA Hattiesburg Regional champions

NCAA Hattiesburg Super Regional, 0–2
- Conference: Conference USA

Ranking
- Coaches: No. 13
- CB: No. 15
- Record: 47–19 (23–7 C-USA)
- Head coach: Scott Berry
- Assistant coaches: Christian Ostrander; Travis Creel; Ben Brewer
- Home stadium: Pete Taylor Park

2022 Conference USA baseball standings
| | Conf. | | | | | | Overall |
| Team | W | | L | | T | PCT | W | | L | | T | PCT |
|---|---|---|---|---|---|---|---|---|---|---|---|---|
| No. 15 Southern Miss ‍†‍‍^{y} | 23 | – | 7 | – | 0 | .767 | 43 | – | 16 | – | 0 | .729 |
| Louisiana Tech ‍‍‡‍^{y} | 20 | – | 10 | – | 0 | .667 | 42 | – | 19 | – | 0 | .689 |
| Old Dominion ‍‍‍ | 19 | – | 11 | – | 0 | .633 | 41 | – | 17 | – | 0 | .707 |
| Florida Atlantic ‍‍‍ | 19 | – | 11 | – | 0 | .633 | 35 | – | 23 | – | 0 | .603 |
| UTSA ‍‍‍ | 19 | – | 11 | – | 0 | .633 | 38 | – | 20 | – | 0 | .655 |
| Middle Tennessee ‍‍‍ | 17 | – | 13 | – | 0 | .567 | 29 | – | 26 | – | 0 | .527 |
| Charlotte ‍‍‍ | 17 | – | 13 | – | 0 | .567 | 36 | – | 22 | – | 0 | .621 |
| UAB ‍‍‍ | 13 | – | 17 | – | 0 | .433 | 31 | – | 25 | – | 0 | .554 |
| Rice ‍‍‍ | 9 | – | 21 | – | 0 | .300 | 17 | – | 39 | – | 0 | .304 |
| Marshall ‍‍‍ | 9 | – | 21 | – | 0 | .300 | 20 | – | 34 | – | 1 | .373 |
| FIU ‍‍‍ | 8 | – | 22 | – | 0 | .267 | 16 | – | 34 | – | 0 | .320 |
| Western Kentucky ‍‍‍ | 7 | – | 23 | – | 0 | .233 | 18 | – | 36 | – | 0 | .333 |
† – Conference champion ‡ – Tournament champion y – Invited to the NCAA tournament Rankings from D1Baseball

The 2022 Southern Miss Golden Eagles baseball team represented the University of Southern Mississippi in the sport of baseball for the 2022 college baseball season. The Golden Eagles competed in Division I of the National Collegiate Athletic Association (NCAA) and in Conference USA. They played their home games at Pete Taylor Park in Hattiesburg, Mississippi. The team was coached by Scott Berry, who was in his thirteenth season with the Golden Eagles. This was Southern Miss' last season to compete as a member of the C-USA as they moved on to the Sun Belt Conference following the conclusion of the season.

== Preseason ==
=== C-USA media poll ===
The Conference USA preseason poll was released on February 16, 2022 with the Golden Eagles predicted to finish in first place in the conference.

Media poll
| Predicted finish | Team | 1st Place Votes |
| 1 | Southern Miss | 6 |
| 2 | Louisiana Tech | 2 |
| 3 | Old Dominion | 1 |
| 4 | Charlotte | 4 |
| 5 | Florida Atlantic | - |
| 6 | UTSA | - |
| 7 | FIU | 1 |
| 8 | Rice | - |
| 9 | Western Kentucky | - |
| 10 | Middle Tennessee | - |
| 11 | UAB | - |
| 12 | Marshall | - |

=== Preseason All-CUSA team ===
- Danny Lynch – Infielder
- Gabe Montenegro – Outfielder
- Charlie Fischer – Designated Hitter
- Ben Ethridge – Pitcher

== Personnel ==
2022 Southern Miss Golden Eagles baseball team
Players
Coaches

| # | Pos. | Name | B/T | Height | Weight | Year | Home town |
|---|---|---|---|---|---|---|---|
| 1 | INF | Creek Robertson | / | 5 ft 11 in (1.8 m) | 177 lb (80 kg) | Fr | Madison, Mississippi |
| 2 | RHP | Hurtson Waldrep | / | 6 ft 2 in (1.88 m) | 205 lb (93 kg) | So | Thomasville, Georgia |
| 3 | RHP | Landon Harper | / | 6 ft 1 in (1.85 m) | 176 lb (80 kg) | So | Meridian, Mississippi |
| 4 | LHP | Drew Boyd | / | 6 ft 1 in (1.85 m) | 202 lb (92 kg) | Jr | Hattiesburg, Mississippi |
| 6 | INF | Will McGillis | / | 6 ft 3 in (1.91 m) | 208 lb (94 kg) | Jr | San Diego, California |
| 7 | OF | Slade Wilks | / | 6 ft 2 in (1.88 m) | 213 lb (97 kg) | So | Columbia, Mississippi |
| 8 | INF | Matt Cedarburg | / | 6 ft 0 in (1.83 m) | 180 lb (82 kg) | So | Fort Myers, Florida |
| 9 | RHP | Isaiah Rhodes | / | 6 ft 2 in (1.88 m) | 167 lb (76 kg) | So | McKinney, Texas |
| 10 | INF | Dustin Dickerson | / | 6 ft 1 in (1.85 m) | 172 lb (78 kg) | So | Laurel, Mississippi |
| 11 | RHP | Aubrey Gillentine | / | 6 ft 3 in (1.91 m) | 233 lb (106 kg) | Jr | Amory, Mississippi |
| 12 | LHP | Kros Sivley | / | 6 ft 0 in (1.83 m) | 180 lb (82 kg) | Fr | Sumrall, Mississippi |
| 13 | RHP | Matthew Adams | / | 5 ft 11 in (1.8 m) | 180 lb (82 kg) | So | Pearland, Texas |
| 14 | OF | Gabe Montenegro | / | 5 ft 8 in (1.73 m) | 181 lb (82 kg) | Sr | Guatemala City, Guatemala |
| 15 | C | Rodrigo Montenegro | / | 5 ft 9 in (1.75 m) | 192 lb (87 kg) | So | Guatemala City, Guatemala |
| 16 | INF | Casey Artigues | / | 5 ft 8 in (1.73 m) | 170 lb (77 kg) | Fr | Hammond, Louisiana |
| 18 | LHP | Dalton Rogers | / | 5 ft 11 in (1.8 m) | 172 lb (78 kg) | So | Flowood, Mississippi |
| 19 | RHP | Tyler Stuart | / | 6 ft 9 in (2.06 m) | 250 lb (113 kg) | So | Kankakee, Illinois |
| 20 | INF | Brady Faust | / | 5 ft 11 in (1.8 m) | 175 lb (79 kg) | So | New Orleans, Louisiana |
| 21 | OF | Bryce Fowler | / | 5 ft 11 in (1.8 m) | 176 lb (80 kg) | Fr | Madison, Mississippi |
| 22 | INF | Charlie Fischer | / | 6 ft 2 in (1.88 m) | 216 lb (98 kg) | Jr | Edina, Minnesota |
| 23 | RHP | Niko Mazza | / | 5 ft 11 in (1.8 m) | 183 lb (83 kg) | Fr | Madison, Mississippi |
| 24 | RHP | Ben Ethridge | / | 6 ft 2 in (1.88 m) | 180 lb (82 kg) | So | Collinsville, Mississippi |
| 25 | C | Blake Johnson | / | 5 ft 9 in (1.75 m) | 190 lb (86 kg) | Jr | Gulfport, Mississippi |
| 26 | INF | Danny Lynch | / | 6 ft 3 in (1.91 m) | 221 lb (100 kg) | Jr | Jupiter, Florida |
| 28 | RHP | Tanner Hall | / | 6 ft 1 in (1.85 m) | 178 lb (81 kg) | So | Zachary, Louisiana |
| 29 | LHP | Chandler Best | / | 6 ft 0 in (1.83 m) | 195 lb (88 kg) | So | Mobile, Alabama |
| 30 | RHP | Hunter Riggins | / | 6 ft 3 in (1.91 m) | 200 lb (91 kg) | Gr | Hernando, Mississippi |
| 32 | RHP | Garrett Ramsey | / | 6 ft 3 in (1.91 m) | 194 lb (88 kg) | Jr | Brandon, Mississippi |
| 35 | LHP | Justin Storm | / | 6 ft 7 in (2.01 m) | 232 lb (105 kg) | So | Madison, Mississippi |
| 37 | OF | Carson Paetow (redshirt) | / | 6 ft 3 in (1.91 m) | 209 lb (95 kg) | Fr | Vancleave, Mississippi |
| 38 | OF | Reece Ewing | / | 5 ft 10 in (1.78 m) | 191 lb (87 kg) | Jr | Mobile, Alabama |
| 39 | INF | Matthew Russo | / | 6 ft 3 in (1.91 m) | 248 lb (112 kg) | Fr | Madisonville, Louisiana |
| 41 | | Christopher Sargent | / | 6 ft 1 in (1.85 m) | 199 lb (90 kg) | Jr | Wilmer, Alabama |
| 48 | LHP | Riley Dawkins | / | 6 ft 2 in (1.88 m) | 185 lb (84 kg) | Fr | Starkville, Mississippi |
| 52 | RHP | Will Tynes (redshirt) | / | 6 ft 2 in (1.88 m) | 195 lb (88 kg) | Fr | Bossier City, Louisiana |

Head coach

Scott Berry (Southwest Missouri State)

Assistant coach(es)

Christian Ostrander (Delta State)
Travis Creel (Southern Miss)
Ben Brewer (Belhaven)

Legend

- (C) Team captain
- (S) Suspended
- (I) Ineligible
- Injured
- Current redshirt

Roster
Last update: 30 July 2022

== Schedule and results ==
2022 Southern Miss Golden Eagles baseball game log
Regular season (41–14)

February (5–2)
| Date | Opponent | Rank | Site/stadium | Score | Win | Loss | Save | TV | Attendance | Overall record | C-USA record |
|---|---|---|---|---|---|---|---|---|---|---|---|
| Feb. 18 | North Alabama | | Pete Taylor Park • Hattiesburg, MS | W 8–1 | Ethridge (1-0) | Haberstock (0-1) | Stuart (1) | CUSA.TV | 4,449 | 1–0 | |
| Feb. 19 | North Alabama | | Pete Taylor Park • Hattiesburg, MS | W 7–3 | Riggins (1-0) | Bradshaw (0-1) | None | CUSA.TV | 4,737 | 2–0 | |
| Feb. 20 | North Alabama | | Pete Taylor Park • Hattiesburg, MS | W 14–1 | Waldrep (1-0) | Nichols (0-1) | None | CUSA.TV | 4,820 | 3–0 | |
| Feb. 22 | South Alabama | | Pete Taylor Park • Hattiesburg, MS | L 5–6^{13} | Brougham (1-0) | Harper (0-1) | Copenhaver (1) | CUSA.TV | 4,502 | 3–1 | |
| Feb. 25 | Jacksonville State | | Pete Taylor Park • Hattiesburg, MS | W 4–3 | Stuart (1-0) | Hathcock (0-1) | None | CUSA.TV | 4,632 | 4–1 | |
| Feb. 26 | Jacksonville State | | Pete Taylor Park • Hattiesburg, MS | W 5–1 | Riggins (2-0) | Jones (0-2) | Harper (1) | CUSA.TV | 4,418 | 5–1 | |
| Feb. 27 | Jacksonville State | | Pete Taylor Park • Hattiesburg, MS | L 3–5 | Peppers (1-1) | Best (0-1) | Causey (1) | CUSA.TV | 4,271 | 5–2 | |

March (12–5)
| Date | Opponent | Rank | Site/stadium | Score | Win | Loss | Save | TV | Attendance | Overall record | C-USA record |
|---|---|---|---|---|---|---|---|---|---|---|---|
| Mar. 2 | at No. 9 Mississippi State | | Dudy Noble Field • Starkville, MS | W 7–1 | Hall (1-0) | Fristoe (1-1) | None | | 6,387 | 6–2 | |
| Mar. 4 | at Louisiana | | M. L. Tigue Moore Field at Russo Park • Lafayette, LA | L 3–5 | Ray (1-1) | Ethridge (1-1) | Talley (1) | | 4,382 | 6–3 | |
| Mar. 5 | at Louisiana | | M. L. Tigue Moore Field at Russo Park • Lafayette, LA | W 5–0 | Riggins (3-0) | Theut (0-2) | None | | 4,334 | 7–3 | |
| Mar. 6 | at Louisiana | | M. L. Tigue Moore Field at Russo Park • Lafayette, LA | W 4–2 | Ramsey (1-0) | Bonds (1-1) | None | | 4,218 | 8–3 | |
| Mar. 8 | South Alabama | | Pete Taylor Park • Hattiesburg, MS | W 7–5 | Rogers (1-0) | Johnson (0-2) | Harper (2) | ESPN+ | 4,241 | 9–3 | |
| Mar. 9 | No. 18 Tulane | | Pete Taylor Park • Hattiesburg, MS | W 7–2 | Hall (2-0) | Robinson (1-1) | None | ESPN+ | 4,363 | 10–3 | |
| Mar. 12 | at Dallas Baptist | | Horner Ballpark • Dallas, TX | L 1–3 | Meador (3-0) | Ethridge (1-2) | Arnold (1) | | 846 | 10–4 | |
| Mar. 12 | at Dallas Baptist | | Horner Ballpark • Dallas, TX | L 0–2 | Eldred (2-0) | Riggins (3-1) | Rose (1) | | 864 | 10–5 | |
| Mar. 13 | at Dallas Baptist | | Horner Ballpark • Dallas, TX | L 4–10 | Russell (1-0) | Waldrep (1-1) | None | | 892 | 10–6 | |
| Mar. 16 | at Alabama | | Sewell–Thomas Stadium • Tuscaloosa, AL | W 3–2 | Stuart (2-0) | Banks (0-1) | Ramsey (1) | ESPN+ | 5,388 | 11–6 | |
| Mar. 18 | Florida Atlantic | | Pete Taylor Park • Hattiesburg, MS | W 9–7 | Ramsey (2-0) | Visconti (1-1) | None | ESPN+ | 4,543 | 12–6 | 1–0 |
| Mar. 19 | Florida Atlantic | | Pete Taylor Park • Hattiesburg, MS | W 6–4 | Harper (1-1) | Waterbor (1-1) | Ramsey (2) | ESPN+ | 4,663 | 13–6 | 2–0 |
| Mar. 20 | Florida Atlantic | | Pete Taylor Park • Hattiesburg, MS | L 3–7 | Josey (2-2) | Ethridge (1-3) | None | ESPN+ | 4,304 | 13–7 | 2–1 |
| Mar. 23 | at New Orleans | | Maestri Field at Privateer Park • New Orleans, LA | W 12–8 | Rhodes (1-0) | Cunningham (0-1) | None | | 452 | 14–7 | |
| Mar. 25 | at Western Kentucky | | Nick Denes Field • Bowling Green, KY | W 10–8 | Hall (3-0) | Kates (3-2) | Harper (3) | | 149 | 15–7 | 3–1 |
| Mar. 26 | at Western Kentucky | | Nick Denes Field • Bowling Green, KY | W 14–2 | Rhodes (2-0) | Peter (0-4) | Rogers (1) | | 195 | 16–7 | 4–1 |
| Mar. 27 | at Western Kentucky | | Nick Denes Field • Bowling Green, KY | W 11–0^{7} | Waldrep (2-1) | Terbrak (3-1) | None | | 168 | 17–7 | 5–1 |

April (16–3)
| Date | Opponent | Rank | Site/stadium | Score | Win | Loss | Save | TV | Attendance | Overall record | C-USA record |
|---|---|---|---|---|---|---|---|---|---|---|---|
| Apr. 1 | Louisiana Tech | | Pete Taylor Park • Hattiesburg, MS | W 8–2 | Hall (4-0) | Fincher (5-1) | None | ESPN+ | 5,469 | 18–7 | 6–1 |
| Apr. 2 | Louisiana Tech | | Pete Taylor Park • Hattiesburg, MS | L 2–4 | Gibson (4-0) | Riggins (3-2) | Crigger (4) | ESPN+ | 5,706 | 18–8 | 6–2 |
| Apr. 3 | Louisiana Tech | | Pete Taylor Park • Hattiesburg, MS | W 8–0 | Waldrep (3-1) | Whorff (2-4) | None | ESPN+ | 5,138 | 19–8 | 7–2 |
| Apr. 5 | at No. 9 Ole Miss | No. 18 | Swayze Field • Oxford, MS | W 10–7 | Ramsey (3-0) | Johnson (1-1) | Harper (4) | | 4,530 | 20–8 | |
| Apr. 8 | at Charlotte | No. 18 | Robert and Mariam Hayes Stadium • Charlotte, NC | W 2–1 | Hall (5-0) | Giesting (1-3) | Harper (5) | ESPN+ | 775 | 21–8 | 8–2 |
| Apr. 9 | at Charlotte | No. 18 | Robert and Mariam Hayes Stadium • Charlotte, NC | W 8–2 | Riggins (4-2) | Lancaster (3-1) | None | ESPN+ | 872 | 22–8 | 9–2 |
| Apr. 10 | at Charlotte | No. 18 | Robert and Mariam Hayes Stadium • Charlotte, NC | W 6–5 | Ramsey (4-0) | Sims (1-1) | None | ESPN+ | 877 | 23–8 | 10–2 |
| Apr. 12 | Southeastern Louisiana | No. 11 | Pete Taylor Park • Hattiesburg, MS | W 3–2 | Gillentine (1-0) | Lauve (0-3) | Ramsey (3) | ESPN+ | 4,567 | 24–8 | |
| Apr. 14 | at FIU | No. 11 | Infinity Insurance Park • Miami, FL | W 5–3 | Hall (6-0) | Lampton (0-1) | Harper (6) | CUSA.TV | 200 | 25–8 | 11–2 |
| Apr. 15 | at FIU | No. 11 | Infinity Insurance Park • Miami, FL | W 12–4 | Riggins (5-2) | Pena (1-3) | Rhodes (1) | CUSA.TV | 175 | 26–8 | 12–2 |
| Apr. 16 | at FIU | No. 11 | Infinity Insurance Park • Miami, FL | W 6–4 | Ramsey (5-0) | Tiburcio (2-2) | None | CUSA.TV | 420 | 27–8 | 13–2 |
| Apr. 19 | at Tulane | No. 6 | Greer Field at Turchin Stadium • New Orleans, LA | W 11–5 | Boyd (1-0) | Hoffman (1-4) | Harper (7) | ESPN+ | 2,227 | 28–8 | |
| Apr. 20 | New Orleans | No. 6 | Pete Taylor Park • Hattiesburg, MS | W 10–5 | Gillentine (2-0) | Khachadourian (2-2) | Rogers (2) | ESPN+ | 4,688 | 29–8 | |
| Apr. 22 | Rice | No. 6 | Pete Taylor Park • Hattiesburg, MS | W 1–0 | Hall (7-0) | Chandler (1-7) | Harper (8) | ESPN+ | 4,904 | 30–8 | 14–2 |
| Apr. 23 | Rice | No. 6 | Pete Taylor Park • Hattiesburg, MS | W 6–3 | Rhodes (3-0) | DeLeon (2-3) | Rogers (3) | ESPN+ | 4,952 | 31–8 | 15–2 |
| Apr. 24 | Rice | No. 6 | Pete Taylor Park • Hattiesburg, MS | W 12–2^{7} | Waldrep (4-1) | Garcia (1-2) | None | ESPN+ | 4,822 | 32–8 | 16–2 |
| Apr. 26 | at Southeastern Louisiana | No. 4 | Pat Kenelly Diamond at Alumni Field • Hammond, LA | W 9–4 | Adams (1-0) | O'Toole (2-4) | Harper (9) | | 1,524 | 33–8 | |
| Apr. 29 | at UAB | No. 4 | Regions Field • Birmingham, AL | L 6–10 | Ballard (6-1) | Rogers (3-1) | Moza (1) | ESPN+ | 279 | 33–9 | 16–3 |
| Apr. 30 | at UAB | No. 4 | Regions Field • Birmingham, AL | L 2–3 | Harris (2-1) | Riggins (5-3) | Moza (2) | ESPN+ | 428 | 33–10 | 16–4 |

May (8–4)
| Date | Opponent | Rank | Site/stadium | Score | Win | Loss | Save | TV | Attendance | Overall record | C-USA record |
|---|---|---|---|---|---|---|---|---|---|---|---|
| May 1 | at UAB | No. 4 | Regions Field • Birmingham, AL | W 9–6 | Waldrep (5-1) | Walton (5-3) | None | CUSA.TV | 411 | 34–10 | 17–4 |
| May 3 | at South Alabama | No. 7 | Eddie Stanky Field • Mobile, AL | W 6–4 | Storm (1-0) | Carter (0-2) | Rogers (4) | ESPN+ | 2,769 | 35–10 | |
| May 6 | Old Dominion | No. 7 | Pete Taylor Park • Hattiesburg, MS | L 1–4 | Morgan (6-0) | Hall (7-1) | Hartline (6) | ESPN+ | 4,909 | 35–11 | 17–5 |
| May 7 | Old Dominion | No. 7 | Pete Taylor Park • Hattiesburg, MS | L 3–4 | Gomez (3-1) | Riggins (5-4) | None | ESPN+ | 4,769 | 35–12 | 17–6 |
| May 8 | Old Dominion | No. 7 | Pete Taylor Park • Hattiesburg, MS | W 5–4^{10} | Harper (2-1) | Smith (0-2) | None | ESPN+ | 4,458 | 36–12 | 18–6 |
| May 11 | Ole Miss | No. 14 | Pete Taylor Park • Hattiesburg, MS | L 1–4 | McDaniel (5-2) | Adams (1-1) | Johnson (7) | ESPN+ | 6,346 | 36–13 | |
| May 13 | UTSA | No. 14 | Pete Taylor Park • Hattiesburg, MS | L 7–8 | Garza (3-0) | Hall (7-2) | Malone (2) | ESPN+ | 4,592 | 36–14 | 18–7 |
| May 14 | UTSA | No. 14 | Pete Taylor Park • Hattiesburg, MS | W 8–3 | Riggins (6-4) | Quiroga (1-4) | Rogers (5) | ESPN+ | 4,465 | 37–14 | 19–7 |
| May 15 | UTSA | No. 14 | Pete Taylor Park • Hattiesburg, MS | W 9–5 | Storm (2-0) | Malone (7-3) | Harper (10) | ESPN+ | 4,461 | 38–14 | 20–7 |
| May 19 | at Middle Tennessee | No. 17 | Reese Smith Jr. Field • Murfreesboro, TN | W 9–4 | Adams (2-1) | Seibert (4-4) | Ramsey (4) | CUSA.TV | 734 | 39–14 | 21–7 |
| May 20 | at Middle Tennessee | No. 17 | Reese Smith Jr. Field • Murfreesboro, TN | W 17–0 | Riggins (7-4) | Swan (2-6) | None | CUSA.TV | 751 | 40–14 | 22–7 |
| May 21 | at Middle Tennessee | No. 17 | Reese Smith Jr. Field • Murfreesboro, TN | W 10–0 | Waldrep (6-1) | Sells (4-3) | None | CUSA.TV | 532 | 41–14 | 23–7 |

Postseason (6–5)

C-USA Tournament (2–2)
| Date | Opponent | (Seed)/Rank | Site/stadium | Score | Win | Loss | Save | TV | Attendance | Overall record | Tournament record |
|---|---|---|---|---|---|---|---|---|---|---|---|
| May 25 | vs. (8) UAB | (1)/No. 14 | Pete Taylor Park • Hattiesburg, MS | W 4–3 | Hall (8-2) | Reynolds (2-6) | Harper (11) | ESPN+ | | 42–14 | 1–0 |
| May 27 | vs. (5) UTSA | (1)/No. 14 | Pete Taylor Park • Hattiesburg, MS | L 6–7 | Miller (4-3) | Harper (2-2) | None | ESPN+ | 3,379 | 42–15 | 1–1 |
| May 27 | vs. (4) Florida Atlantic | (1)/No. 14 | Pete Taylor Park • Hattiesburg, MS | W 5–0 | Riggins (8-4) | Josey (4-5) | Rogers (6) | ESPN+ | 3,172 | 43–15 | 2–1 |
| May 28 | vs. (5) UTSA | (1)/No. 14 | Pete Taylor Park • Hattiesburg, MS | L 2–11 | Garza (4-1) | Adams (2-2) | None | ESPN+ | | 43–16 | 2–2 |

NCAA Hattiesburg Regional (4–1)
| Date | Opponent | (Seed)/Rank | Site/stadium | Score | Win | Loss | Save | TV | Attendance | Overall record | Tournament record |
|---|---|---|---|---|---|---|---|---|---|---|---|
| Jun. 3 | vs. (4) Army | (1)/No. 15 | Pete Taylor Park • Hattiesburg, MS | W 2–0 | Hall (9-2) | Early (7-4) | Harper (12) | ESPN+ | 5,045 | 44–16 | 1–0 |
| Jun. 4 | vs. (2) LSU | (1)/No. 15 | Pete Taylor Park • Hattiesburg, MS | L 6–7^{10} | Gervase (4-1) | Ramsey (5-1) | None | ESPN+ | 5,211 | 44–17 | 1–1 |
| Jun. 5 | vs. (3) Kennesaw State | (1)/No. 15 | Pete Taylor Park • Hattiesburg, MS | W 4–3^{10} | Stuart (3-0) | Torbert (4-3) | None | ESPN+ | 5,054 | 45–17 | 2–1 |
| Jun. 5 | vs. (2) LSU | (1)/No. 15 | Pete Taylor Park • Hattiesburg, MS | W 8–4 | Storm (3-0) | Cooper (4-3) | None | ESPN+ | 5,179 | 46–17 | 3–1 |
| Jun. 6 | vs. (2) LSU | (1)/No. 15 | Pete Taylor Park • Hattiesburg, MS | W 8–7 | Stuart (4-0) | Reyzelman (1-3) | None | ESPN+ | 5,256 | 47–17 | 4–1 |

NCAA Hattiesburg Super Regional (0–2)
| Date | Opponent | (Seed)/Rank | Site/stadium | Score | Win | Loss | Save | TV | Attendance | Overall record | Tournament record |
|---|---|---|---|---|---|---|---|---|---|---|---|
| Jun. 11 | vs. Ole Miss | No. 15 | Pete Taylor Park • Hattiesburg, MS | L 0–10 | DeLucia (6-2) | Waldrep (6-2) | Dougherty (2) | ESPNU | 5,474 | 47–18 | 4–2 |
| Jun. 12 | vs. Ole Miss | No. 15 | Pete Taylor Park • Hattiesburg, MS | L 0–5 | Elliott (4-3) | Hall (9-3) | Mallitz (2) | ESPNU | 5,469 | 47–19 | 4–3 |

Legend: = Win = Loss = Cancelled/Postponed

Schedule source:

*Rankings are based on the team's current ranking in the D1Baseball poll.

== Hattiesburg Regional ==
Hattiesburg Regional Teams
| (1) Southern Miss Golden Eagles | (2) LSU Tigers | (3) Kennesaw State Owls | (4) Army Black Knights |

First Round
1 | No. 15 Southern Miss | 2
4 | Army | 0
3 | Kennesaw State | 11
2 | LSU | 14
Lower round 1
4 | Army | 8
3 | Kennesaw State | 9

Semi-Finals
1 | No. 15 Southern Miss | 6^{10}
2 | LSU | 7
Lower final
3 | Kennesaw State | 3^{10}
1 | No. 15 Southern Miss | 4

Finals
2 | LSU | 4 | 7
1 | No. 15 Southern Miss | 8 | 8

== Hattiesburg Super Regional ==
Hattiesburg Super Regional Teams
| Southern Miss Golden Eagles | Ole Miss Rebels |

Game 1
| Rank | Team | Score |
| | Ole Miss | 10 |
| 11 | Southern Miss | 0 |

Game 2
| Rank | Team | Score |
| | Ole Miss | 5 |
| 11 | Southern Miss | 0 |

== Postseason ==
| Accolade | Recipient | Reference |
|---|---|---|
| ABCA/Rawlings First Team All-American team | Tanner Hall, P | |
| Collegiate Baseball Freshman All-American team | Carson Paetow, OF | |
| C-USA Pitcher of the Year | Tanner Hall, P | |
| C-USA Keith LeClair Coach of the Year | Scott Berry | |
| C-USA Assistant Coach of the Year | Christian Ostrander | |
| First Team All-CUSA team | Tanner Hall, P Hurston Waldrep, P Landon Harper, P | |
| Second Team All-CUSA team | Dustin Dickerson, INF | |
| Freshman All-CUSA team | Carson Paetow, OF | |

== Rankings ==
Ranking movements Legend: ██ Increase in ranking ██ Decrease in ranking — = Not ranked RV = Received votes
| | Week | | | | | | | | | | | | | | | | |
| Poll | Pre | 1 | 2 | 3 | 4 | 5 | 6 | 7 | 8 | 9 | 10 | 11 | 12 | 13 | 14 | 15 | Final |
|---|---|---|---|---|---|---|---|---|---|---|---|---|---|---|---|---|---|
| Coaches' | RV | RV* | RV | RV | — | RV | RV | 24 | 14 | 6 | 5 | 7 | 11 | 16 | 12 | 10 | 13 |
| Baseball America | — | — | — | — | — | — | — | 22 | 14 | 7 | 6 | 13 | 17 | 18 | 16 | 17 | 16 |
| Collegiate Baseball^ | RV | — | — | — | — | — | 27 | 27 | 27 | 15 | 8 | 16 | 20 | 26 | 20 | 22 | 15 |
| NCBWA† | — | — | — | — | — | — | — | 26 | 15 | 6 | 4 | 5 | 12 | 18 | 17 | 17 | 11 |
| D1Baseball | — | — | — | — | — | — | — | 18 | 11 | 6 | 4 | 7 | 14 | 17 | 14 | 15 | 15 |

^ Collegiate Baseball ranked 40 teams in their preseason poll, but only ranked 30 teams weekly during the season.
† NCBWA ranks 30 teams in their preseason poll, but only ranks 25 teams weekly during the season.
* A new poll was not released for this week, so for comparison purposes, the previous week's ranking is inserted in this week's slot.
