= 2022 Old Dominion Monarchs baseball team =

Baseball team season

2022 Old Dominion Monarchs baseball
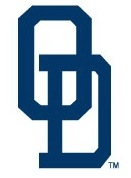
- Conference: Conference USA
- East Division
- Record: 41–17 (19–11 C-USA)
- Head coach: Chris Finwood
- Assistant coaches: Mike Marron; Logan Robbins
- Home stadium: Bud Metheny Baseball Complex

2022 Conference USA baseball standings
	Conf.						Overall
Team	W		L		T	PCT	W		L		T	PCT
No. 15 Southern Miss ‍†‍‍^{y}	23	–	7	–	0	.767	43	–	16	–	0	.729
Louisiana Tech ‍‍‡‍^{y}	20	–	10	–	0	.667	42	–	19	–	0	.689
Old Dominion ‍‍‍	19	–	11	–	0	.633	41	–	17	–	0	.707
Florida Atlantic ‍‍‍	19	–	11	–	0	.633	35	–	23	–	0	.603
UTSA ‍‍‍	19	–	11	–	0	.633	38	–	20	–	0	.655
Middle Tennessee ‍‍‍	17	–	13	–	0	.567	29	–	26	–	0	.527
Charlotte ‍‍‍	17	–	13	–	0	.567	36	–	22	–	0	.621
UAB ‍‍‍	13	–	17	–	0	.433	31	–	25	–	0	.554
Rice ‍‍‍	9	–	21	–	0	.300	17	–	39	–	0	.304
Marshall ‍‍‍	9	–	21	–	0	.300	20	–	34	–	1	.373
FIU ‍‍‍	8	–	22	–	0	.267	16	–	34	–	0	.320
Western Kentucky ‍‍‍	7	–	23	–	0	.233	18	–	36	–	0	.333
† – Conference champion ‡ – Tournament champion y – Invited to the NCAA tournament Rankings from D1Baseball

The 2022 Old Dominion Monarchs baseball team represented Old Dominion University in the sport of baseball for the 2022 college baseball season. The Monarchs competed in Division I of the National Collegiate Athletic Association (NCAA) and in Conference USA East Division. They played their home games at Bud Metheny Baseball Complex, on the university's Norfolk campus. The team was coached by Chris Finwood, who was in his eleventh season with the Monarchs.

== Preseason ==
=== C-USA media poll ===
The Conference USA preseason poll was released on February 16, 2022, with the Monarchs predicted to finish in third place in the conference.

Media poll
Predicted finish	Team	1st Place Votes
1	Southern Miss	6
2	Louisiana Tech	2
3	Old Dominion	1
4	Charlotte	4
5	Florida Atlantic	-
6	UTSA	-
7	FIU	1
8	Rice	-
9	Western Kentucky	-
10	Middle Tennessee	-
11	UAB	-
12	Marshall	-

=== Preseason All-CUSA team ===
- Brock Gagliardi – Catcher
- Tommy Bell – Infielder
- Andy Garriola – Outfielder
- Carter Trice – Outfielder
- Jason Hartline – Pitcher
- Noah Dean – Pitcher

== Personnel ==
2022 Old Dominion Monarchs baseball team
Players
Coaches

#	Pos.	Name	B/T	Height	Weight	Year	Home town
0	LHP	Luke Dawson	L/L	6 ft 4 in (1.93 m)	185 lb (84 kg)	Gr	Naples, Florida
1	OF	Lincoln Ransom	R/R	6 ft 2 in (1.88 m)	205 lb (93 kg)	So	Whiteville, North Carolina
4		Carter Rice	R/R	5 ft 11 in (1.8 m)	190 lb (86 kg)	So	Mechanicsville, Virginia
6	OF	Robbie Petracci	L/L	5 ft 11 in (1.8 m)	195 lb (88 kg)	So	Egg Harbor Township, New Jersey
7	INF	Kenny Levari	L/R	6 ft 2 in (1.88 m)	185 lb (84 kg)	So	Vineland, New Jersey
9	OF	Andy Garriola	R/R	6 ft 5 in (1.96 m)	235 lb (107 kg)	Sr	Sierra Madre, California
10	C	Brock Gagliardi	L/R	6 ft 2 in (1.88 m)	230 lb (104 kg)	Sr	Tacoma, Washington
11	INF	Tommy Bell	R/R	6 ft 1 in (1.85 m)	200 lb (91 kg)	Sr	Kettering, Ohio
12	RHP	Antwan Walton	R/R	6 ft 6 in (1.98 m)	200 lb (91 kg)	Fr	Emporia, Virginia
14	INF	Luke Waters	R/R	6 ft 1 in (1.85 m)	190 lb (86 kg)	Fr	Laurel, Delaware
15	INF	Chris Dengler	R/R	5 ft 11 in (1.8 m)	163 lb (74 kg)	So	Charleston, South Carolina
16	OF	Josh Trujillo	L/L	6 ft 1 in (1.85 m)	180 lb (82 kg)	So	Spanaway, Washington
17	C	James Tarkenton II	R/R	6 ft 3 in (1.91 m)	220 lb (100 kg)	So	Greenbrae, California
18	OF	Ryan Teschko	R/R	6 ft 1 in (1.85 m)	190 lb (86 kg)	Jr	National Park, New Jersey
19	INF	Kyle Edwards	R/R	5 ft 10 in (1.78 m)	180 lb (82 kg)	Fr	Chesapeake, Virginia
20	LHP	Joey Dechiaro	R/L	6 ft 2 in (1.88 m)	220 lb (100 kg)	So	Flemington, New Jersey
21	INF	Matt Coutney	L/R	6 ft 1 in (1.85 m)	230 lb (104 kg)	Sr	Edmonton, Alberta
23	C	Robby Barrientos	R/R	5 ft 9 in (1.75 m)	190 lb (86 kg)	So	Pennsauken, New Jersey
24		Joey Morton	L/L	6 ft 4 in (1.93 m)	215 lb (98 kg)	Fr	Nottingham, Pennsylvania
27	OF	Thomas Wheeler	L/L	6 ft 0 in (1.83 m)	195 lb (88 kg)	Jr	Roy, Washington
28		Andrea Dalatri	R/R	6 ft 2 in (1.88 m)	205 lb (93 kg)	So	Wall, New Jersey
29	LHP	Noah Dean	L/L	6 ft 2 in (1.88 m)	185 lb (84 kg)	So	Little Egg Harbor, New Jersey
30	OF	Dominick Claxton (redshirt)	R/R	5 ft 10 in (1.78 m)	175 lb (79 kg)	Sr	Carrollton, Virginia
32	RHP	Nick Pantos (redshirt)	R/R	6 ft 4 in (1.93 m)	220 lb (100 kg)	Sr	Rockville, Maryland
33	RHP	Pete Nielsen (redshirt)	L/R	6 ft 2 in (1.88 m)	220 lb (100 kg)	Jr	Vienna, Virginia
34	RHP	Brett Smith	R/R	6 ft 4 in (1.93 m)	225 lb (102 kg)	Gr	Chesapeake, Virginia
36	RHP	Brad Dobzanski (redshirt)	R/R	6 ft 2 in (1.88 m)	195 lb (88 kg)	Jr	Franklinville, New Jersey
37	RHP	Ari Silverstein (redshirt)	R/R	6 ft 5 in (1.96 m)	245 lb (111 kg)	Jr	Doylestown, Pennsylvania
38	LHP	Jason Hartline	L/L	6 ft 4 in (1.93 m)	225 lb (102 kg)	Sr	Chesapeake, Virginia
39	RHP	Kellen Davis (redshirt)	R/R	6 ft 0 in (1.83 m)	190 lb (86 kg)	Fr	Media, Pennsylvania
40	RHP	Connor Muly (redshirt)	R/R	6 ft 1 in (1.85 m)	190 lb (86 kg)	Jr	Manasquan, New Jersey
41	LHP	Trey Fisher	L/L	6 ft 0 in (1.83 m)	190 lb (86 kg)	Sr	Temperanceville, Virginia
42	RHP	Sam Armstrong	R/R	6 ft 2 in (1.88 m)	250 lb (113 kg)	So	Wantage, New Jersey
43	LHP	Jacob Gomez	R/L	5 ft 10 in (1.78 m)	180 lb (82 kg)	So	Rutherford, New Jersey
44	LHP	Tommy Gertner	L/L	6 ft 1 in (1.85 m)	195 lb (88 kg)	Sr	Northbrook, Illinois
45	RHP	Henry Hersum	R/R	6 ft 7 in (2.01 m)	225 lb (102 kg)	Fr	Saunderstown, Rhode Island
46	LHP	Blake Morgan	L/L	6 ft 1 in (1.85 m)	175 lb (79 kg)	Fr	Marlton, New Jersey
47	LHP	Connor Schumann	L/L	6 ft 0 in (1.83 m)	200 lb (91 kg)	Fr	Midlothian, Virginia
49	RHP	Vincent Bashara	L/R	6 ft 0 in (1.83 m)	180 lb (82 kg)	So	Norfolk, Virginia
50	C	Jared Hancock	R/R	6 ft 0 in (1.83 m)	180 lb (82 kg)	Jr	Pocomoke City, Maryland
51	RHP	Joey Rodriguez (redshirt)	R/R	6 ft 0 in (1.83 m)	185 lb (84 kg)	So	Virginia Beach, Virginia
52	OF	Bryce Jones	L/R	6 ft 1 in (1.85 m)	175 lb (79 kg)	Fr	Virginia Beach, Virginia
55	RHP	John Keane	R/R	6 ft 1 in (1.85 m)	190 lb (86 kg)	Sr	Williamsburg, Virginia

Head coach

Chris Finwood (VMI)

Assistant coach(es)

Mike Marron (Holy Cross)
Logan Robbins (Western Kentucky)

Legend

- (C) Team captain
- (S) Suspended
- (I) Ineligible
- Injured
- Current redshirt

Roster
Last update: 31 July 2022

== Schedule and results ==
2022 Old Dominion Monarchs baseball game log
Regular season (38–15)

February (5–1)
Date	Opponent	Rank	Site/stadium	Score	Win	Loss	Save	TV	Attendance	Overall record	C-USA record
Feb. 18	Iona		Bud Metheny Baseball Complex • Norfolk, VA	W 4–2	Rodrigues (1-0)	Sullivan (0-1)	Hartline (1)	CUSA.TV	356	1–0	
Feb. 19	Iona		Bud Metheny Baseball Complex • Norfolk, VA	W 24–0	Pantos (1-0)	Helmstetter (0-1)	None	CUSA.TV	572	2–0	
Feb. 20	Iona		Bud Metheny Baseball Complex • Norfolk, VA	W 19–1	Armstrong (1-0)	Chiaia (0-1)	None	CUSA.TV	255	3–0	
Feb. 25	Binghamton		Bud Metheny Baseball Complex • Norfolk, VA	L 1–4	Babalis (1-0)	Gertner (0-1)	Collins (1)	CUSA.TV	256	3–1	
Feb. 26	Binghamton		Bud Metheny Baseball Complex • Norfolk, VA	W 5–2	Pantos (2-0)	Lumpinski (0-2)	Hartline (2)	CUSA.TV	166	4–1	
Feb. 27	Binghamton		Bud Metheny Baseball Complex • Norfolk, VA	W 8–7	Dobzanksi (1-0)	Driscoll (0-1)	Dean (1)	CUSA.TV	156	5–1	

March (13–4)
Date	Opponent	Rank	Site/stadium	Score	Win	Loss	Save	TV	Attendance	Overall record	C-USA record
Mar. 1	at VMI		Gray–Minor Stadium • Richmond, VA	W 3–1	Gomez (1-0)	Hungate (1-1)	Dean (2)	ESPN+	456	6–1	
Mar. 4	Bryant		Bud Metheny Baseball Complex • Norfolk, VA	W 1–0	Gertner (1-1)	Lowe (1-2)	Hartline (3)	CUSA.TV	89	7–1	
Mar. 5	Bryant		Bud Metheny Baseball Complex • Norfolk, VA	W 7–6	Dean (1-0)	Picard (1-1)	None	CUSA.TV	250	8–1	
Mar. 6	Bryant		Bud Metheny Baseball Complex • Norfolk, VA	W 23–7	Rodriguez (2-0)	MacDonald (0-1)	None	CUSA.TV	572	9–1	
Mar. 8	Princeton		Bud Metheny Baseball Complex • Norfolk, VA	W 15–5	Morgan (1-0)	Rabin (0-3)	None	CUSA.TV	175	10–1	
Mar. 9	Princeton		Bud Metheny Baseball Complex • Norfolk, VA	Game cancelled							
Mar. 11	Stony Brook		Bud Metheny Baseball Complex • Norfolk, VA	W 9–3	Rodriguez (3-0)	Fero (0-1)	Hartline (4)	CUSA.TV	417	11–1	
Mar. 11	Stony Brook		Bud Metheny Baseball Complex • Norfolk, VA	W 8–3	Pantos (3-0)	Lashley (0-1)	Dean (3)	CUSA.TV	291	12–1	
Mar. 13	Stony Brook		Bud Metheny Baseball Complex • Norfolk, VA	W 18–6	Rodriguez (4-0)	O'Neill (1-2)	None	CUSA.TV	412	13–1	
Mar. 15	East Carolina		Bud Metheny Baseball Complex • Norfolk, VA	W 9–8^{10}	Dobzanski (2-0)	Beal (2-1)	None	CUSA.TV	512	14–1	
Mar. 18	at Middle Tennessee		Reese Smith Jr. Field • Murfreesboro, TN	W 23–7	Gertner (2-1)	Keenan (0-1)	None	CUSA.TV		15–1	1–0
Mar. 19	at Middle Tennessee		Reese Smith Jr. Field • Murfreesboro, TN	W 6–3	Pantos (4-0)	Swan (0-3)	Dean (4)	CUSA.TV	502	16–1	2–0
Mar. 20	at Middle Tennessee		Reese Smith Jr. Field • Murfreesboro, TN	L 5–13	Seibert (2-2)	Smith (0-1)	None	CUSA.TV	550	16–2	2–1
Mar. 22	VMI		Bud Metheny Baseball Complex • Norfolk, VA	W 6–2	Gomez (2-0)	Kaltreider (0-4)	None	CUSA.TV	562	17–2	
Mar. 25	Charlotte		Bud Metheny Baseball Complex • Norfolk, VA	L 4–11	Giesting (1-1)	Gertner (1-2)	Wilson (1)	CUSA.TV	418	17–3	2–2
Mar. 26	Charlotte		Bud Metheny Baseball Complex • Norfolk, VA	L 8–13	Lancaster (3-0)	Hartline (0-1)	None	CUSA.TV	471	17–4	2–3
Mar. 27	Charlotte		Bud Metheny Baseball Complex • Norfolk, VA	W 13–12^{10}	Dean (2-0)	Martinez (0-2)	None	CUSA.TV	263	18–4	3–3
Mar. 29	Campbell		Bud Metheny Baseball Complex • Norfolk, VA	L 6–8	Murray (1-0)	Nielsen (0-1)	Kangas (1)	CUSA.TV	111	18–5	

April (11–6)
Date	Opponent	Rank	Site/stadium	Score	Win	Loss	Save	TV	Attendance	Overall record	C-USA record
Apr. 1	at FIU		Infinity Insurance Park • Miami, FL	L 3–13	Pridgen (2-3)	Gertner (1-3)	None	CUSA.TV	427	18–6	3–4
Apr. 2	at FIU		Infinity Insurance Park • Miami, FL	W 14–7	Dobzanski (3-0)	Lequerica (1-2)	None		391	19–6	4–4
Apr. 3	at FIU		Infinity Insurance Park • Miami, FL	W 18–5	Armstrong (2-0)	Cabarcas (2-3)	None		200	20–6	5–4
Apr. 6	at East Carolina		Clark–LeClair Stadium • Greenville, NC	W 8–7	Bashara (1-0)	Grosz (2-3)	Dean (5)	ESPN+	2,673	21–6	
Apr. 8	UTSA		Bud Metheny Baseball Complex • Norfolk, VA	W 11–0	Morgan (2-0)	Malone (4-1)	Gomez (1)	CUSA.TV	86	22–6	6–4
Apr. 9	UTSA		Bud Metheny Baseball Complex • Norfolk, VA	L 7–8^{11}	Shafer (2-1)	Dean (2-1)	None	CUSA.TV	392	22–7	6–5
Apr. 10	UTSA		Bud Metheny Baseball Complex • Norfolk, VA	L 4–13	Davis (2-1)	Armstrong (2-1)	None	CUSA.TV	204	22–8	6–6
Apr. 12	at No. 8 Virginia		Davenport Field at Disharoon Park • Charlottesville, VA	W 9–2	Gertner (2-3)	Buchanan (2-1)	None	ACCNX	3,347	23–8	
Apr. 14	at UAB		Regions Field • Birmingham, AL	W 13—2	Morgan (3-0)	Reynolds (2-3)	None	CUSA.TV	226	24—8	7—6
Apr. 15	at UAB		Regions Field • Birmingham, AL	W 9–5	Pantos (5-0)	O'Clair (1-2)	None	ESPN+	217	25–8	8–6
Apr. 15	at UAB		Regions Field • Birmingham, AL	L 4–7	Walton (5-2)	Armstrong (2-2)	None	CUSA.TV	217	25–9	8–7
Apr. 19	at William & Mary		Plumeri Park • Williamsburg, VA	W 5–1	Gertner (3-3)	Tsakounis (4-2)	Hartline (5)	CUSA.TV	393	26–9	
Apr. 22	Florida Atlantic		Bud Metheny Baseball Complex • Norfolk, VA	W 14–0	Morgan (4-0)	Cooley (5-3)	None	ESPN+	338	27–9	9–7
Apr. 23	Florida Atlantic		Bud Metheny Baseball Complex • Norfolk, VA	W 11–7	Pantos (6-0)	Josey (4-3)	None	CUSA.TV	455	28–9	10–7
Apr. 24	Florida Atlantic		Bud Metheny Baseball Complex • Norfolk, VA	L 4–5	Burnham (4-0)	Gomez (2-1)	Wegielnik (5)	CUSA.TV	299	28–10	10–8
Apr. 26	No. 11 Virginia		Bud Metheny Baseball Complex • Norfolk, VA	Game cancelled							
Apr. 29	Louisiana Tech		Bud Metheny Baseball Complex • Norfolk, VA	W 5–0	Morgan (5-0)	Gibson (4-3)	None	ESPN+	492	29–10	11–8
Apr. 30	Louisiana Tech		Bud Metheny Baseball Complex • Norfolk, VA	L 5–10	Harland (2-0)	Dean (2-2)	None	CUSA.TV	412	29–11	11–9

May (9–4)
Date	Opponent	Rank	Site/stadium	Score	Win	Loss	Save	TV	Attendance	Overall record	C-USA record
May 1	Louisiana Tech		Bud Metheny Baseball Complex • Norfolk, VA	L 4–8	Tomkins (4-0)	Gertner (4-4)	None	CUSA.TV	664	29–12	11–10
May 6	at No. 7 Southern Miss		Pete Taylor Park • Hattiesburg, MS	W 4–1	Morgan (6-0)	Hall (7-1)	Hartline (6)	ESPN+	4,909	30–12	12–10
May 7	at No. 7 Southern Miss		Pete Taylor Park • Hattiesburg, MS	W 4–3	Gomez (3-1)	Riggins (5-4)	None	ESPN+	4,769	31–12	13–10
May 8	at No. 7 Southern Miss		Pete Taylor Park • Hattiesburg, MS	L 4–5^{10}	Harper (2-1)	Smith (0-2)	None	ESPN+	4,458	31–13	13–11
May 10	VCU		Bud Metheny Baseball Complex • Norfolk, VA	L 2–8	Frazier (1-0)	Nielsen (0-2)	Serrano (4)	CUSA.TV	274	31–14	
May 11	William & Mary		Bud Metheny Baseball Complex • Norfolk, VA	L 0–5	Pearson (1-0)	Gertner (4-5)	None	CUSA.TV	127	31–15	
May 13	Marshall		Bud Metheny Baseball Complex • Norfolk, VA	W 13–8	Morgan (7-0)	Purnell (5-5)	None	CUSA.TV	317	32–15	14–11
May 14	Marshall		Bud Metheny Baseball Complex • Norfolk, VA	W 8–7	Dean (3-2)	Capuano (2-7)	None	CUSA.TV	279	33–15	15–11
May 15	Marshall		Bud Metheny Baseball Complex • Norfolk, VA	W 5–4	Smith (1-2)	Agemy (2-3)	None	CUSA.TV	566	34–15	16–11
May 17	at VMI		Gray–Minor Stadium • Lexington, VA	W 8–6	Fisher (1-0)	Thompson (0-1)	Smith (1)		87	35–15	
May 19	at Western Kentucky		Nick Denes Field • Bowling Green, KY	W 5–3	Hartline (1-1)	Vinyard (2-2)	Dean (6)		119	36–15	17–11
May 20	at Western Kentucky		Nick Denes Field • Bowling Green, KY	W 11–4	Gomez (4-1)	Stofel (0-8)	None		219	37–15	18–11
May 21	at Western Kentucky		Nick Denes Field • Bowling Green, KY	W 5–4	Armstrong (3-2)	Bergeron (2-4)	Dean (7)		205	38–15	19–11

Postseason (3–2)

C-USA Tournament (3–2)
Date	Opponent	(Seed)/Rank	Site/stadium	Score	Win	Loss	Save	TV	Attendance	Overall record	Tournament record
May 25	vs. (6) Middle Tennessee	(3)	Pete Taylor Park • Hattiesburg, MS	W 18–7	Morgan (8-0)	Seibert (4-5)	None	ESPN+		39–15	1–0
May 26	vs. (2) Louisiana Tech	(3)	Pete Taylor Park • Hattiesburg, MS	L 2–7	Jennings (1-0)	Pantos (6-1)	None	ESPN+		39–16	1–1
May 27	vs. (7) Charlotte	(3)	Pete Taylor Park • Hattiesburg, MS	W 13–4	Gomez (5-1)	Rossi (5-1)	None	ESPN+		40–16	2–1
May 28	vs. (2) Louisiana Tech	(3)	Pete Taylor Park • Hattiesburg, MS	W 9–6^{13}	Hartline (2-1)	Whorff (5-7)	None	ESPN+	2,873	41–16	3–1
May 28	vs. (2) Louisiana Tech	(3)	Pete Taylor Park • Hattiesburg, MS	L 7–8	Crigger (5-2)	Pantos (6-2)	None	ESPN+	2,873	41–17	3–2

Legend: = Win = Loss = Cancelled/Postponed

Schedule source:

*Rankings are based on the team's current ranking in the D1Baseball poll.

== Postseason ==
Accolade	Recipient	Reference
ABCA/Rawlings Second Team All-American team	Matt Coutney, INF	
ABCA/Rawlings Third Team All-American team	Andy Garriola, OF	
NCBWA Freshman All-American team	Blake Morgan, P	
Collegiate Baseball Freshman All-American team	Blake Morgan, P	
C-USA Player of the Year	Matt Coutney, INF	
C-USA Freshman of the Year	Blake Morgan, P	
First Team All-CUSA team	Brock Gagliardi, C Matt Coutney, INF; Andy Garriola, OF; Blake Morgan, P	
Second Team All-CUSA team	Carter Trice, OF	
Freshman All-CUSA team	Blake Morgan, P	

== Rankings ==
Ranking movements Legend: ██ Increase in ranking ██ Decrease in ranking — = Not ranked RV = Received votes
	Week																
Poll	Pre	1	2	3	4	5	6	7	8	9	10	11	12	13	14	15	Final
Coaches'	RV	RV*	RV	RV	RV	RV	RV	—	—	—	—	—	RV	RV	—	—	—
Baseball America	24	23	24	24	24	25	—	—	—	—	—	—	—	—	—	—	—
Collegiate Baseball^	49	—	30	25	21	18	28	29	—	—	—	—	—	—	—	—	—
NCBWA†	27	28	26	27	25	25	30	—	—	—	—	—	—	—	—	—	—
D1Baseball	—	—	—	—	—	—	—	—	—	—	—	—	—	—	—	—	—

^ Collegiate Baseball ranked 40 teams in their preseason poll, but only ranked 30 teams weekly during the season.
† NCBWA ranks 30 teams in their preseason poll, but only ranks 25 teams weekly during the season.
* A new poll was not released for this week, so for comparison purposes, the previous week's ranking is inserted in this week's slot.
