= 2021 Old Dominion Monarchs baseball team =

Baseball team season

2021 Old Dominion Monarchs baseball
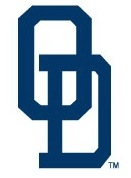

C-USA tournament champions

Columbia Regional, 2–2
- Conference: Conference USA
- East Division

Ranking
- Coaches: No. 17
- CB: No. 26
- Record: 44–16 (22–10 C-USA)
- Head coach: Chris Finwood
- Assistant coaches: Mike Marron; Logan Robbins
- Home stadium: Bud Metheny Baseball Complex

2021 Conference USA baseball standings
	Conf.						Overall
Team	W		L		T	PCT	W		L		T	PCT
East
Charlotte ^{x}‍‍‍^{y}	24	–	8	–	0	.750	40	–	21	–	0	.656
No. 16 Old Dominion ‍‍‡‍^{y}	22	–	10	–	0	.688	44	–	16	–	0	.733
Florida Atlantic ‍‍‍	18	–	14	–	0	.563	32	–	25	–	0	.561
Western Kentucky ‍‍‍	15	–	17	–	0	.469	27	–	29	–	0	.482
FIU ‍‍‍	11	–	19	–	0	.367	20	–	31	–	0	.392
Marshall ‍‍‍	6	–	26	–	0	.188	10	–	35	–	0	.222
West
No. 22 Louisiana Tech ^{x}‍‍‍^{y}	22	–	8	–	0	.733	42	–	20	–	0	.677
No. 23 Southern Miss ‍‍‍^{y}	22	–	9	–	0	.710	40	–	21	–	0	.656
UTSA ‍‍‍	14	–	17	–	0	.452	22	–	26	–	0	.458
Middle Tennessee ‍‍‍	12	–	19	–	1	.391	24	–	29	–	1	.454
Rice ‍‍‍	11	–	20	–	1	.359	23	–	29	–	1	.443
UAB ‍‍‍	11	–	21	–	0	.344	18	–	36	–	0	.333
x – Division champion ‡ – Tournament champion y – Invited to the NCAA tournament As of June 7, 2021; Rankings from D1Baseball

The 2021 Old Dominion Monarchs baseball team represented Old Dominion University in the sport of baseball for the 2021 college baseball season. The Monarchs competed in Division I of the National Collegiate Athletic Association (NCAA) and in Conference USA East Division. They played their home games at Bud Metheny Baseball Complex, on the university's Norfolk campus. The team was coached by Chris Finwood, who was in his tenth season with the Monarchs.

== Preseason ==
=== C-USA media poll ===
The Conference USA preseason poll was released on February 11, 2021, with the Monarchs predicted to finish in second place in the East Division.

Media poll (East)
Predicted finish	Team	1st Place Votes
1	Florida Atlantic	10
2	Old Dominion	1
3	FIU	1
4	WKU	-
5	Charlotte	-
6	Marshall	-

=== Preseason All-CUSA team ===
- Hunter Gregory – Starting Pitcher

== Schedule and results ==
2021 Old Dominion Monarchs baseball game log
Regular season (38–14)

February (5–2)
Date	Opponent	Site/stadium	Score	Attendance	Overall record	C-USA record
February 19	Norfolk State	Bud Metheny Baseball Complex; Norfolk, VA	Canceled			
February 20	Norfolk State	Bud Metheny Baseball Complex	W 7-1	250	1-0	-
February 21	Norfolk State	Bud Metheny Baseball Complex	W 12-0	243	2-0	-
February 23	Norfolk State	Bud Metheny Baseball Complex	W 12-5	223	3-0	-
February 24	Norfolk State	Bud Metheny Baseball Complex	W 19-2	230	4-0	-
February 26	Rhode Island	Bud Metheny Baseball Complex	L 4-6	187	4-1	-
February 27	Rhode Island	Bud Metheny Baseball Complex	L 5-6^{10}	202	4-2	-
February 28	Rhode Island	Bud Metheny Baseball Complex	W 16-3	192	5-2	-

March (12–3)
Date	Opponent	Site/stadium	Score	Attendance	Overall record	C-USA record
March 2	at No. 17 East Carolina	Clark–LeClair Stadium; Greenville, NC	W 6-5^{12}	215	6-2	-
March 5	Northeastern	Bud Metheny Baseball Complex; Norfolk, VA	W 10-8	167	7-2	-
March 6	Northeastern	Bud Metheny Baseball Complex	L 5-6	242	7-3	-
March 7	Northeastern	Bud Metheny Baseball Complex	W 3-2^{11}	158	8-3	-
March 10	at William & Mary	Plumeri Park; Williamsburg, VA	W 8-2	135	9-3	-
March 12	Ball State	Bud Metheny Baseball Complex	W 6-3	343	10-3	-
March 13	Ball State	Bud Metheny Baseball Complex	W 10-5	337	11-3	-
March 14	Ball State	Bud Metheny Baseball Complex	W 2-1^{10}	243	12-3	-
March 17	VCU	Bud Metheny Baseball Complex	L 5-12	211	12-4	-
March 19	George Mason	Bud Metheny Baseball Complex	Canceled			
March 20	Richmond	Malcolm U. Pitt Field; Richmond, VA	W 4-3		13-4	-
March 23	at VCU	The Diamond; Richmond, VA	W 5-3	197	14-4	-
March 26	FIU	Bud Metheny Baseball Complex	L 12-15	337	14-5	0-1
March 27 (1)	FIU	Bud Metheny Baseball Complex	W 14-0		15-5	1-1
March 27 (2)	FIU	Bud Metheny Baseball Complex	W 3-2	250	16-5	2-1
March 28	FIU	Bud Metheny Baseball Complex	W 16-9	389	17-5	3-1

April (12–5)
Date	Opponent	Rank	Site/stadium	Score	Attendance	Overall record	C-USA record
April 2	at Marshall		Kennedy Center Field; Huntington, WV	W 12-1	61	18-5	4-1
April 3 (1)	at Marshall		Kennedy Center Field	W 8-7	53	19-5	5-1
April 3 (2)	at Marshall		Kennedy Center Field	W 8-0	53	20-5	6-1
April 4	at Marshall		Kennedy Center Field	W 15-7	59	21-5	7-1
April 9	at Florida Atlantic		FAU Baseball Stadium; Boca Raton, FL	W 7-2	286	22-5	8-1
April 10 (1)	at Florida Atlantic		FAU Baseball Stadium	W 10-3	286	23-5	9-1
April 10 (2)	at Florida Atlantic		FAU Baseball Stadium	W 8-2	286	24-5	10-1
April 11	at Florida Atlantic		FAU Baseball Stadium	L 0-4	254	24-6	10-2
April 14	at Virginia	No. 22	Davenport Field; Charlottesville, VA	Postponed			
April 16	Rice	No. 22	Bud Metheny Baseball Complex; Norfolk, VA	W 11-4	402	25-6	11-2
April 17 (1)	Rice	No. 22	Bud Metheny Baseball Complex	W 11-2	402	26-6	12-2
April 17 (2)	Rice	No. 22	Bud Metheny Baseball Complex	L 2-11	270	26-7	12-3
April 18	Rice	No. 22	Bud Metheny Baseball Complex	W 4-1	278	27-7	13-3
April 20	William & Mary	No. 20	Bud Metheny Baseball Complex	Postponed			
April 23 (1)	at No. 19 Charlotte	No. 20	Hayes Stadium; Charlotte, NC	L 4-5		27-8	13-4
April 23 (2)	at No. 19 Charlotte	No. 20	Hayes Stadium	W 9-5	164	28-8	14-4
April 25 (1)	at No. 19 Charlotte	No. 20	Hayes Stadium	L 3-8		28-9	14-5
April 25 (2)	at No. 19 Charlotte	No. 20	Hayes Stadium	L 1-7	163	28-10	14-6
April 30	No. 15 Charlotte	No. 25	Bud Metheny Baseball Complex	W 8-3	492	29-10	15-6

May (9–4)
Date	Opponent	Rank	Site/stadium	Score	Attendance	Overall record	C-USA record
May 1 (1)	No. 15 Charlotte	No. 25	Bud Metheny Baseball Complex; Norfolk, VA	L 2-6	503	29-11	15-7
May 1 (2)	No. 15 Charlotte	No. 25	Bud Metheny Baseball Complex	W 14-2	386	30-11	16-7
May 2	No. 15 Charlotte	No. 25	Bud Metheny Baseball Complex	W 10-0	446	31-11	17-7
May 7	at UTSA	No. 22	Roadrunner Field; San Antonio, TX	W 14-11	103	32-11	18-7
May 8 (1)	at UTSA	No. 22	Roadrunner Field	L 10-12		32-12	18-8
May 8 (2)	at UTSA	No. 22	Roadrunner Field	L 0-11	113	32-13	18-9
May 9	at UTSA	No. 22	Roadrunner Field	W 6-2	117	33-13	19-9
May 14	Western Kentucky		Bud Metheny Baseball Complex	W 14-8	454	34-13	20-9
May 15 (1)	Western Kentucky		Bud Metheny Baseball Complex	W 6-3	815	35-13	21-9
May 15 (2)	Western Kentucky		Bud Metheny Baseball Complex	L 6-7^{8}	526	35-14	21-10
May 16	Western Kentucky		Bud Metheny Baseball Complex	W 13-2	516	36-14	22-10
May 20	at No. 14 Louisiana Tech		Pat Patterson Park; Ruston, LA	W 10-8	1,538	37-14	-
May 21	at No. 14 Louisiana Tech		Pat Patterson Park	W 8-7	1,673	38-14	-

Postseason (6–2)

C-USA Tournament (4–0)
Date	Opponent	Rank (Seed)	Site/stadium	Score	Attendance	Overall record	Tournament record
May 26	vs. (5) Florida Atlantic	No. 24 (4)	Pat Patterson Park; Ruston, LA	W 11-2		39-14	1-0
May 27	vs. (8) Middle Tennessee	No. 24 (4)	Pat Patterson Park	W 10-6		40-14	2-0
May 29	vs. (5) Florida Atlantic	No. 24 (4)	Pat Patterson Park	W 13-5		41-14	3-0
May 30	vs. No. 18 (2) Louisiana Tech	No. 24 (4)	Pat Patterson Park	W 7-5^{10}	2,484	42-14	4-0

NCAA Columbia Regional (2–2)
Date	Opponent	Rank (Seed)	Site/stadium	Score	Attendance	Overall record	Tournament record
June 4	vs. (4) Jacksonville	No. 15 (1)	Founders Park; Columbia, SC	W 4-3	4,043	43-14	1-0
June 5	at (2) South Carolina	No. 15 (1)	Founders Park	W 2-1	7,315	44-14	2-0
June 6	vs. (3) Virginia	No. 15 (1)	Founders Park	L 3-8	3,993	44-15	2-1
June 7	vs. (3) Virginia	No. 15 (1)	Founders Park	L 3-4^{10}	3,831	44-16	2-2

Legend: = Win = Loss = Cancelled/Postponed

Schedule source:

*Rankings are based on the team's current ranking in the D1Baseball poll.

=== Columbia Regional ===
Columbia Regional Teams
(1) Old Dominion Monarchs	(2) South Carolina Gamecocks	(3) Virginia Cavaliers	(4) Jacksonville Dolphins

First Round
1	Old Dominion	4
4	Jacksonville	3
3	Virginia	3
2	South Carolina	4
Lower round 1
4	Jacksonville	8
3	Virginia	13

Semi-Finals
1	Old Dominion	2
2	South Carolina	1
Lower final
2	South Carolina	2
3	Virginia	3

Finals
1	Old Dominion
3	Virginia

== Rankings ==
Ranking movements Legend: ██ Increase in ranking ██ Decrease in ranking — = Not ranked RV = Received votes
	Week																		
Poll	Pre	1	2	3	4	5	6	7	8	9	10	11	12	13	14	15	16	17	Final
Coaches'	—	—*	—	—	RV	—	RV	RV	22	20	25	20	24	25	21	15	15*	15*	17
Baseball America	—	—	—	—	—	—	—	—	—	25	—	20	23	20	18	14	14*	14*	16
Collegiate Baseball^	—	—	—	—	—	—	—	30	30	30	—	29	—	—	—	24	26	26	26
NCBWA†	—	—	—	RV	RV	RV	RV	29	22	20	23	19	25	24	20	14	17	17*	17
D1Baseball	—	—	—	—	—	—	—	—	22	20	25	22	—	—	24	15	15*	15*	16

^ Collegiate Baseball ranked 40 teams in their preseason poll, but only ranked 30 teams weekly during the season.
† NCBWA ranks 30 teams in their preseason poll, but only ranks 25 teams weekly during the season.
* A new poll was not released for this week, so for comparison purposes, the previous week's ranking is inserted in this week's slot.
