= 2021 Florida Atlantic Owls baseball team =

Baseball team season

2021 Florida Atlantic Owls baseball
- Conference: Conference USA
- East Division
- Record: 32-25 (18-14 C-USA)
- Head coach: John McCormack
- Hitting coach: Greg Mamula
- Pitching coach: David Kopp
- Home stadium: FAU Baseball Stadium

2021 Conference USA baseball standings
	Conf.						Overall
Team	W		L		T	PCT	W		L		T	PCT
East
Charlotte ^{x}‍‍‍^{y}	24	–	8	–	0	.750	40	–	21	–	0	.656
No. 16 Old Dominion ‍‍‡‍^{y}	22	–	10	–	0	.688	44	–	16	–	0	.733
Florida Atlantic ‍‍‍	18	–	14	–	0	.563	32	–	25	–	0	.561
Western Kentucky ‍‍‍	15	–	17	–	0	.469	27	–	29	–	0	.482
FIU ‍‍‍	11	–	19	–	0	.367	20	–	31	–	0	.392
Marshall ‍‍‍	6	–	26	–	0	.188	10	–	35	–	0	.222
West
No. 22 Louisiana Tech ^{x}‍‍‍^{y}	22	–	8	–	0	.733	42	–	20	–	0	.677
No. 23 Southern Miss ‍‍‍^{y}	22	–	9	–	0	.710	40	–	21	–	0	.656
UTSA ‍‍‍	14	–	17	–	0	.452	22	–	26	–	0	.458
Middle Tennessee ‍‍‍	12	–	19	–	1	.391	24	–	29	–	1	.454
Rice ‍‍‍	11	–	20	–	1	.359	23	–	29	–	1	.443
UAB ‍‍‍	11	–	21	–	0	.344	18	–	36	–	0	.333
x – Division champion ‡ – Tournament champion y – Invited to the NCAA tournament As of June 7, 2021; Rankings from D1Baseball

The 2021 Florida Atlantic Owls baseball team represented Florida Atlantic University in the sport of baseball for the 2021 college baseball season. The Owls competed in Division I of the National Collegiate Athletic Association (NCAA) and the Conference USA. They played their home games at FAU Baseball Stadium, on the university's Boca Raton campus. The team was coached by John McCormack, who was in his thirteenth season at Florida Atlantic.

== Previous season ==
The 2020 Owls finished 10–6 overall. This season was cancelled due to the COVID-19 pandemic.

== Preseason ==
=== C-USA media poll ===
The Conference USA preseason poll was released on February 11, 2021 with the Owls predicted to finish in first place in the East Division.

Media poll (East)
Predicted finish	Team	1st Place Votes
1	Florida Atlantic	10
2	Old Dominion	1
3	FIU	1
4	WKU	-
5	Charlotte	-
6	Marshall	-

=== Preseason All-CUSA teams ===
- Bobby Morgensen – Outfielder
- Mitchell Hartigan – Designated Hitter/Utility Player

== Personal ==
=== Roster ===
2021 Florida Atlantic Owls roster
Pitchers: 2 - Jacob Josey - Sophomore; 7 - Javi Rivera - Sophomore; 14 - Brock Helverson - (redshirt) Sophomore; 15 - Brycen Allen - (redshirt) Junior; 16 - Adrien Reese - Junior; 18 - Hunter Cooley - Sophomore; 21 - Jon Jon Kostantis - Sophomore; 22 - Jackson Vescelus - (redshirt) Junior; 25 - Braden Ostrander - Freshman; 26 - Jack Stroud - Freshman; 27 - Dylan O'Connell - (redshirt) Junior; 29 - Evan Waterbor - Sophomore; 30 - John Dwyer - Sophomore; 31 - TJ Stuart - Graduate Student; 32 - Jackson Spiller - Sophomore; 35 - Mike Entenza - Junior; 37 - Dante Visconti - Freshman; 38 - Matt Sparling - (redshirt) Junior; 40 - Ethan Kramer - Freshman; 41 - Marc DeGusipe - Freshman; 42 - Sam Drumheller - Freshman; 44 - Nicholas Del Prado - Freshman; 49 - Thomas Haggerty - (redshirt) Junior	Catchers: 17 - Shane Magrann - Sophomore; 33 - Nicolas Toney - Sophomore; 34 - Caleb Pendleton - Freshman; Infielders: 1 - Cade Parker - Freshman; 4 - Wilfredo Alvarez - Senior; 6 - Sam Low - Senior; 9 - B.J. Murray - Sophomore; 13 - Steven Loden - Freshman; 19 - Jared DeSantolo - Junior; 28 - Daulton Frank - Freshman	Outfielders: 5 - Jalen DeBose - Freshman; 10 - Bobby Morgensen - Senior; 11 - Jackson Wenstrom - Junior; 12 - Nolan Schanuel - Freshman; 23 - Victor Castillo - Freshman; 24 - Mitchell Hartigan - Sophomore

=== Coaching staff ===
Coaching Staff
- John McCormack - Head Coach - 13th year
- Greg Mamula - Hitting Coach - 6th year
- David Kopp - Pitching Coach - 4th year
- Tristan McGinnis - Volunteer Assistant Coach - 2nd year
- Tyler Krull - Graduate Manager - 1st year

== Schedule and results ==
2021 Florida Atlantic Owls baseball game log
Regular season (30–23)

February (6–1)
Date	Opponent	Site/stadium	Score	Win	Loss	Save	Attendance	Overall record	C-USA record
February 19	at UCF	John Euliano Park; Orlando, FL	**W** 12-6	**Cooley** (1-0)	B. McKay (0-1)	None	821	1-0	-
February 20	UCF	FAU Baseball Stadium; Boca Raton, FL	**W** 20-15	**Reese** (1-0)	H. Patterson (0-1)	None	286	2-0	-
February 21	UCF	FAU Baseball Stadium	**L** 6-15	Litchfield (1-0)	**Stuart** (0-1)	J. Sinclair (1)	286	2-1	-
February 23	at Florida Gulf Coast	Swanson Stadium; Fort Myers, FL	**W** 3-1	**Ostrander** (1-0)	Woodward (0-1)	**Entenza** (1)	204	3-1	-
February 26	Seton Hall	FAU Baseball Stadium	**W** 6-2	**Reese** (2-0)	Burnham (0-1)	None	286	4-1	-
February 27	Seton Hall	FAU Baseball Stadium	**W** 17-14	**Cooley** (2-0)	Anderson (0-1)	**Entenza** (2)	286	5-1	-
February 28	Seton Hall	FAU Baseball Stadium	**W** 10-4	**Sparling** (1-0)	Patten (0-1)	None	286	6-1	-

March (9–8)
Date	Opponent	Rank	Site/stadium	Score	Win	Loss	Save	Attendance	Overall record	C-USA record
March 3	at No. 6 Florida	No. 21	Florida Ballpark; Gainesville, FL	**W** 3-2^{10}	**Entenza** (1-0)	Aleman (0-1)	None	1,626	7-1	-
March 5	Florida Gulf Coast	No. 21	FAU Baseball Stadium	**L** 0-8	Studstill (1-0)	**Spiller** (0-1)	None	286	7-2	-
March 6	at Florida Gulf Coast	No. 21	Swanson Stadium	Postponed (rain) Makeup: March 30						
March 7	Florida Gulf Coast	No. 21	FAU Baseball Stadium	**W** 14-9	**J. Rivera** (1-0)	M. Miller (0-1)	None	286	8-2	-
March 9	at No. 8 Miami (FL)	No. 20	Alex Rodriguez Park; Coral Gables, FL	**L** 2-11	J. Garland (1-1)	**Stuart** (0-2)	None	610	8-3	-
March 11	Indiana State	No. 20	FAU Baseball Stadium	**L** 5-7	C. Edmonson (1-1)	**Cooley** (2-1)	C. Fenlong (2)	286	8-4	-
March 12	Indiana State	No. 20	FAU Baseball Stadium	**L** 2-10	G. Guerrero (3-0)	**Josey** (0-1)	None	286	8-5	-
March 13	Indiana State	No. 20	FAU Baseball Stadium	**W** 7-5	**Sparling** (2-0)	T. Weaver (0-1)	None	286	9-5	-
March 16	at UCF		John Euliano Park	**L** 3-8	Z. Bennett (1-1)	**Entenza** (1-1)	None	1,020	9-6	-
March 19	at South Florida		USF Baseball Stadium; Tampa, FL	**W** 5-1	**Cooley** (3-1)	Jasiak (2-2)	None	101	10-6	-
March 20	at South Florida		USF Baseball Stadium	**L** 0-4	Burns (1-2)	**Sparling** (2-1)	None	108	10-7	-
March 21	at South Florida		USF Baseball Stadium	**L** 5-6^{11}	Lyle (1-0)	**Visconti** (0-1)	None	99	10-8	-
March 23	No. 19 Miami (FL)		FAU Baseball Stadium	**L** 9-14	J. Garland (3-1)	**Stuart** (0-3)	J. Dubberly (1)	286	10-9	-
March 26	Marshall		FAU Baseball Stadium	**W** 12-0^{7}	**Cooley** (4-1)	Sharp (0-1)	None	286	11-9	1-0
March 27 (1)	Marshall		FAU Baseball Stadium	**W** 5-3	**Entenza** (2-1)	Adkins (1-1)	**Ostander** (1)	286	12-9	2-0
March 27 (2)	Marshall		FAU Baseball Stadium	**W** 7-6	**Del Prado** (1-0)	Knight (0-1)	None	286	13-9	3-0
March 28	Marshall		FAU Baseball Stadium	**W** 11-2	**J. Rivera** (2-0)	Cheatwood (1-2)	None	286	14-9	4-0
March 30	at Florida Gulf Coast		Swanson Stadium	**W** 13-11	**O'Connell** (1-0)	M. Miller (2-3)	Ostrander (2)	220	15-9	4-0

April (7–10)
Date	Opponent	Site/stadium	Score	Win	Loss	Save	Attendance	Overall record	C-USA record
April 2	at Charlotte	Robert and Mariam Hayes Stadium; Charlotte, NC	**L** 5-9	McGowan (4-2)	**Cooley** (4-2)	Boss (2)	128	15-10	4-1
April 3 (1)	at Charlotte	Robert and Mariam Hayes Stadium	**L** 8-9^{8}	Lothes (2-0)	**Ostrander** (1-1)	None	138	15-11	4-2
April 3 (2)	at Charlotte	Robert and Mariam Hayes Stadium	**L** 4-5	Giesting (2-0)	**Entenza** (2-2)	None	150	15-12	4-3
April 4	at Charlotte	Robert and Mariam Hayes Stadium	**L** 10-11	Lindsey (3-1)	**Drumheller** (0-1)	Bargo (1)	112	15-13	4-4
April 9	Old Dominion	FAU Baseball Stadium	**L** 2-7	Gomez (3-1)	**Cooley** (4-3)	None	286	15-14	4-5
April 10 (1)	Old Dominion	FAU Baseball Stadium	**L** 3-10	Pantos (3-0)	**Sparling** (2-2)	None	286	15-15	4-6
April 10 (2)	Old Dominion	FAU Baseball Stadium	**L** 2-8	Gregory (4-0)	**Visconti** (0-2)	None	286	15-16	4-7
April 11	Old Dominion	FAU Baseball Stadium	**W** 2-8	**Rivera** (3-0)	Dean (0-1)	None	254	16-16	5-7
April 16	at UAB	Jerry D. Young Memorial Field; Birmingham, AL	**L** 6-7^{10}	B. Greene (3-0)	**Ostander** (1-2)	None	80	16-17	5-8
April 17 (1)	at UAB	Jerry D. Young Memorial Field	**W** 2-1	**Visconti** (1-2)	O'Clair (3-4)	**Drumheller** (1)	80	17-17	6-8
April 17 (2)	at UAB	Jerry D. Young Memorial Field	**L** 2-4	Rusk (1-1)	**Sparling** (2-3)	Greene (1)	80	17-18	6-9
April 18	at UAB	Jerry D. Young Memorial Field	**W** 5-3	**Rivera** (4-0)	Greene (3-1)	None	80	18-18	7-9
April 23	at FIU	Infinity Insurance Park; Miami, FL	**W** 11-6	**Cooley** (5-3)	T. Myrick (6-2)	None	0	19-18	8-9
April 24 (1)	at FIU	Infinity Insurance Park	**W** 16-7	**Visconti** (2-2)	G. Rukes (2-5)	**Spiller** (1)	-	20-18	9-9
April 24 (2)	at FIU	Infinity Insurance Park	**L** 5-6	J. Figueroa (3-1)	**Sparling** (2-4)	A. Tiburcio (4)	-	20-19	9-10
April 25	at FIU	Infinity Insurance Park	**W** 8-7	**Drumheller** (1-1)	Vanheyningen (0-3)	**Ostander** (3)	0	21-19	10-10
April 30	FIU	FAU Baseball Stadium	**W** 12-2^{7}	**Cooley** (6-3)	T. Myrick (6-3)	**Drumheller** (2)	286	22-19	11-10

May (8–4)
Date	Opponent	Site/stadium	Score	Win	Loss	Save	Attendance	Overall record	C-USA record
May 1	FIU	FAU Baseball Stadium	**L** 1-6	G. Rukes (3-5)	**O'Connell** (1-0)	None	286	22-20	11-11
May 2 (1)	FIU	FAU Baseball Stadium	**W** 9-8^{9}	**Visconti** (3-2)	Figueroa, J (3-2)	None	286	23-20	12-11
May 2 (2)	FIU	FAU Baseball Stadium	**W** 3-1	**Rivera** (5-0)	A. Tiburcio (0-3)	None	286	24-20	13-11
May 7 (1)	at Western Kentucky	Nick Denes Field; Bowling Green, KY	**W** 6-3	**Cooley** (7-3)	J. Kates (3-3)	None	79	25-20	14-11
May 7 (2)	at Western Kentucky	Nick Denes Field	**L** 5-6	B. Sutton (3-1)	**Entenza** (2-3)	None	144	25-21	14-12
May 8 (1)	at Western Kentucky	Nick Denes Field	**W** 6-3	**Rivera** (6-0)	D. Terbrak (2-3)	**Visconti** (1)	137	26-21	15-12
May 8 (2)	at Western Kentucky	Nick Denes Field	**W** 6-1	**Helverson** (1-0)	L. Stofel (2-1)	**Drumheller** (3)	210	27-21	16-12
May 14	No. 19 Southern Miss	FAU Baseball Stadium	**W** 3-1	**Cooley** (8-3)	H. Stanley (5-3)	**Visconti** (2)	286	28-21	17-12
May 15 (1)	No. 19 Southern Miss	FAU Baseball Stadium	**L** 5-6	Powell (9-2)	**Sparling** (2-5)	None	286	28-22	17-13
May 15 (2)	No. 19 Southern Miss	FAU Baseball Stadium	**L** 5-6	Waldrep (1-0)	**Reese** (2-1)	Och (2)	286	28-23	17-14
May 16	No. 19 Southern Miss	FAU Baseball Stadium	**W** 9-6	**Visconti** (4-2)	Wehunt (1-2)	None	286	29-23	18-14
May 18	at Miami (FL)	Alex Rodriguez Park	**W** 3-0	**Reese** (3-1)	A. Arguelles (4-1)	**Visconti** (3)	613	30-23	18-14

Postseason (2–2)

C-USA Tournament (2–2)
Date	Opponent	Seed	Site/stadium	Score	Win	Loss	Save	Attendance	Overall record	Tournament record
May 26	vs. No. 24 (4) Old Dominion	(5)	J. C. Love Field at Pat Patterson Park; Ruston, LA	**L** 2-11	Ryne Moore (8-1)	**Cooley** (8-4)	J. Hartline (3)	1,743	30-24	0-1
May 27	vs. No. 22 (1) Charlotte	(5)	J. C. Love Field at Pat Patterson Park	**W** 9-8	**J. Rivera** (7-0)	McGowan (7-4)	**Visconti** (4)	2,216	31-24	1-1
May 28	vs. (8) Middle Tennessee	(5)	J. C. Love Field at Pat Patterson Park	**W** 14-8	**Visconti** (5-2)	Zoz (6-3)	None	1,539	32-24	2-1
May 29	vs. No. 24 (4) Old Dominion	(5)	J. C. Love Field at Pat Patterson Park	**L** 5-13	J. Hartline (5-0)	**Ostrander** (1-3)	None	2,183	32-25	2-2

Legend: = Win = Loss = Cancelled
Bold = Florida Atlantic team member

Schedule source:

*Rankings are based on the team's current ranking in the D1Baseball poll.

== Rankings ==
Ranking movements Legend: ██ Increase in ranking ██ Decrease in ranking — = Not ranked RV = Received votes т = Tied with team above or below
	Week																		
Poll	Pre	1	2	3	4	5	6	7	8	9	10	11	12	13	14	15	16	17	Final
Coaches'	—	—*	RV	22	RV	—	—	—	—	—	—	—	—	—	—	—	—*	—*	—
Baseball America	—	—	—	25	—	—	—	—	—	—	—	—	—	—	—	—	—*	—*	—
Collegiate Baseball^	RV	—	—	27	—	—	—	—	—	—	—	—	—	—	—	—	—	—	—
NCBWA†	RV	RV	26	22т	RV	—	RV	—	—	—	RV	—	—	—	—	—	—	—*	—
D1Baseball	—	—	21	20	—	—	—	—	—	—	—	—	—	—	—	—	—*	—*	—

^ Collegiate Baseball ranked 40 teams in their preseason poll, but only ranked 30 teams weekly during the season.
† NCBWA ranks 30 teams in their preseason poll, but only ranks 25 teams weekly during the season.
* A new poll was not released for this week, so for comparison purposes, the previous week's ranking is inserted in this week's slot.

== Awards ==
Weekly awards
Player	Award	Date Awarded	Ref.
Caleb Pendleton	Collegiate Baseball National Player of the Week	February 22, 2021	
Nolan Schanuel	C-USA Hitter of the Week	February 23, 2021	
Matt Sparling	Collegiate Baseball National Player of the Week	March 1, 2021	
Steven Loden	C-USA Hitter of the Week	May 10, 2021	
Adrien Reese	C-USA Pitcher of the Week	May 24, 2021	
Hunter Cooley	Second Team All-Conference	May 25, 2021	
B.J. Murray	Second Team All-Conference	May 25, 2021	
Nolan Schanuel	Second Team All-Conference	May 25, 2021	
Nolan Schanuel	All-Freshman Team	May 25, 2021	
Nolan Schanuel	Collegiate Baseball Freshman All-America	June 9, 2021	
Nolan Schanuel	Perfect Game Freshman All-America	June 21, 2021	
