= 2021 UTSA Roadrunners baseball team =

Baseball team season

2021 UTSA Roadrunners baseball
- Conference: Conference USA
- West Division
- Record: 22-26 (14-17 C-USA)
- Head coach: Patrick Hallmark
- Assistant coaches: Ryan Aguayo; Zach Butler
- Home stadium: Roadrunner Field

2021 Conference USA baseball standings
	Conf.						Overall
Team	W		L		T	PCT	W		L		T	PCT
East
Charlotte ^{x}‍‍‍^{y}	24	–	8	–	0	.750	40	–	21	–	0	.656
No. 16 Old Dominion ‍‍‡‍^{y}	22	–	10	–	0	.688	44	–	16	–	0	.733
Florida Atlantic ‍‍‍	18	–	14	–	0	.563	32	–	25	–	0	.561
Western Kentucky ‍‍‍	15	–	17	–	0	.469	27	–	29	–	0	.482
FIU ‍‍‍	11	–	19	–	0	.367	20	–	31	–	0	.392
Marshall ‍‍‍	6	–	26	–	0	.188	10	–	35	–	0	.222
West
No. 22 Louisiana Tech ^{x}‍‍‍^{y}	22	–	8	–	0	.733	42	–	20	–	0	.677
No. 23 Southern Miss ‍‍‍^{y}	22	–	9	–	0	.710	40	–	21	–	0	.656
UTSA ‍‍‍	14	–	17	–	0	.452	22	–	26	–	0	.458
Middle Tennessee ‍‍‍	12	–	19	–	1	.391	24	–	29	–	1	.454
Rice ‍‍‍	11	–	20	–	1	.359	23	–	29	–	1	.443
UAB ‍‍‍	11	–	21	–	0	.344	18	–	36	–	0	.333
x – Division champion ‡ – Tournament champion y – Invited to the NCAA tournament As of June 7, 2021; Rankings from D1Baseball

The 2021 UTSA Roadrunners baseball team represented the University of Texas at San Antonio in the sport of baseball for the 2021 college baseball season. The Roadrunners competed in Division I of the National Collegiate Athletic Association (NCAA) and in Conference USA West Division. They played their home games at Roadrunner Field in San Antonio, Texas. The team was coached by Patrick Hallmark, who was in his second season with the Roadrunners.

== Preseason ==
=== C-USA media poll ===
The Conference USA preseason poll was released on February 11, 2021 with the Roadrunners predicted to finish in fifth place in the West Division.

Media poll (West)
Predicted finish	Team	1st Place Votes
1	Southern Miss	10
2	Louisiana Tech	2
3	Rice	-
4	Middle Tennessee	-
5	UTSA	-
6	UAB	-

== Schedule and results ==
2021 UTSA Roadrunners baseball game log
Regular season (22–24)

February (2–1)
Date	Opponent	Site/stadium	Score	Attendance	Overall record	C-USA record
February 19	Utah	Roadrunner Field; San Antonio, TX	Canceled			
February 20	Utah	Roadrunner Field	Canceled			
February 21	Utah	Roadrunner Field	Canceled			
February 26	at Sam Houston State	Don Sanders Stadium; Huntsville, TX	L 2-4	387	0-1	-
February 27	at Sam Houston State	Don Sanders Stadium	W 10-4	387	1-1	-
February 28	at Sam Houston State	Don Sanders Stadium	W 18-5	387	2-1	-

March (9–7)
Date	Opponent	Site/stadium	Score	Attendance	Overall record	C-USA record
March 5	UT Arlington	Roadrunner Field; San Antonio, TX	W 13-1	130	3-1	-
March 6 (1)	UT Arlington	Roadrunner Field	W 3-0		4-1	-
March 6 (2)	UT Arlington	Roadrunner Field	L 1-2	148	4-2	-
March 7	UT Arlington	Roadrunner Field	W 16-1	109	5-2	-
March 10	No. 11 TCU	Roadrunner Field	L 3-6	152	5-3	-
March 12	at No. 21 LSU	Alex Box Stadium; Baton Rouge, LA	L 1-3	3,164	5-4	-
March 13	at No. 21 LSU	Alex Box Stadium	L 9-10^{13}	3,861	5-5	-
March 14	at No. 21 LSU	Alex Box Stadium	L 12-13^{11}	3,186	5-6	-
March 17	at Baylor	Baylor Ballpark; Waco, TX	L 8-10	1,193	5-7	-
March 19	at Texas A&M–Corpus Christi	Chapman Field; Corpus Christi, TX	W 11-5	315	6-7	-
March 20	at Texas A&M–Corpus Christi	Chapman Field	W 7-4	394	7-7	-
March 21	at Texas A&M–Corpus Christi	Chapman Field	W 10-1	287	8-7	-
March 26	at Rice	Reckling Park; Houston, TX	W 16-4	1,220	9-7	1-0
March 27 (1)	at Rice	Reckling Park	L 8-10	1,009	9-8	1-1
March 27 (2)	at Rice	Reckling Park	W 4-1	1,171	10-8	2-1
March 28	at Rice	Reckling Park	W 11-3	1,059	11-8	3-1

April (6–10)
Date	Opponent	Site/stadium	Score	Attendance	Overall record	C-USA record
April 1	Southern Miss	Roadrunner Field; San Antonio, TX	L 1-9	114	11-9	3-2
April 2 (1)	Southern Miss	Roadrunner Field	L 9-13^{10}		11-10	3-3
April 2 (2)	Southern Miss	Roadrunner Field	L 5-11	114	11-11	3-4
April 3	Southern Miss	Roadrunner Field	Canceled			
April 9	Middle Tennessee	Roadrunner Field	W 7-6	94	12-11	4-4
April 10 (1)	Middle Tennessee	Roadrunner Field	L 3-5^{8}		12-12	4-5
April 10 (2)	Middle Tennessee	Roadrunner Field	W 3-2^{8}	125	13-12	5-5
April 11	Middle Tennessee	Roadrunner Field	W 15-1	90	14-12	6-5
April 16	at No. 21 Charlotte	Hayes Stadium; Charlotte, NC	L 2-6	156	14-13	6-6
April 17 (1)	at No. 21 Charlotte	Hayes Stadium	L 6-10		14-14	6-7
April 17 (2)	at No. 21 Charlotte	Hayes Stadium	L 10-11	136	14-15	6-8
April 18	at No. 21 Charlotte	Hayes Stadium	W 11-5	126	15-15	7-8
April 23	Rice	Roadrunner Field	L 6-8	124	15-16	7-9
April 24 (1)	Rice	Roadrunner Field	L 4-5		15-17	7-10
April 24 (2)	Rice	Roadrunner Field	W 12-6	127	16-17	8-10
April 25	Rice	Roadrunner Field	W 12-4	136	17-17	9-10
April 30	at UAB	Jerry D. Young Memorial Field; Birmingham, AL	L 2-4	80	17-18	9-11

May (5–6)
Date	Opponent	Site/stadium	Score	Attendance	Overall record	C-USA record
May 1 (1)	at UAB	Jerry D. Young Memorial Field; Birmingham, AL	L 4-6	80	17-19	9-12
May 1 (2)	at UAB	Jerry D. Young Memorial Field	W 14-3	80	18-19	10-12
May 2	at UAB	Jerry D. Young Memorial Field	W 16-14	80	19-19	11-12
May 7	No. 22 Old Dominion	Roadrunner Field; San Antonio, TX	L 11-14	103	19-20	11-13
May 8 (1)	No. 22 Old Dominion	Roadrunner Field	W 12-10		20-20	12-13
May 8 (2)	No. 22 Old Dominion	Roadrunner Field	W 11-0	113	21-20	13-13
May 9	No. 22 Old Dominion	Roadrunner Field	L 2-6	117	21-21	13-14
May 14	at No. 14 Louisiana Tech	Pat Patterson Park; Ruston, LA	W 7-5	1,548	22-21	14-14
May 15 (1)	at No. 14 Louisiana Tech	Pat Patterson Park	L 1-4	1,545	22-22	14-15
May 15 (2)	at No. 14 Louisiana Tech	Pat Patterson Park	L 7-10^{8}	1,545	22-23	14-16
May 16	at No. 14 Louisiana Tech	Pat Patterson Park	L 7-17	1,609	22-24	14-17
May 18	Incarnate Word	Roadrunner Field	Canceled			

Postseason (0–2)

C-USA Tournament (0–2)
Date	Opponent	Seed	Site/stadium	Score	Attendance	Overall record	Tournament record
May 26	at No. 18 (2) Louisiana Tech	(7)	Pat Patterson Park; Ruston, LA	L 6-7^{12}		22-25	0-1
May 27	vs. (6) Western Kentucky	(7)	Pat Patterson Park	L 9-10^{10}		22-26	0-2

Legend: = Win = Loss = Cancelled/Postponed

Schedule source:

*Rankings are based on the team's current ranking in the D1Baseball poll.
