= 2021 Rice Owls baseball team =

Baseball team season

2021 Rice Owls baseball
- Conference: Conference USA
- West Division
- Record: 23–29–1 (11–20–1 C-USA)
- Head coach: Matt Bragga
- Assistant coaches: Cory Barton; Paul Janish; Trevor Putzig
- Home stadium: Reckling Park

Uniform
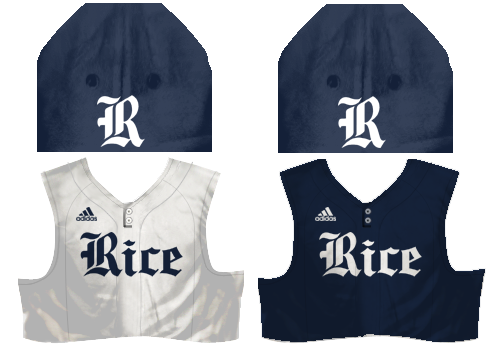

2021 Conference USA baseball standings
	Conf.						Overall
Team	W		L		T	PCT	W		L		T	PCT
East
Charlotte ^{x}‍‍‍^{y}	24	–	8	–	0	.750	40	–	21	–	0	.656
No. 16 Old Dominion ‍‍‡‍^{y}	22	–	10	–	0	.688	44	–	16	–	0	.733
Florida Atlantic ‍‍‍	18	–	14	–	0	.563	32	–	25	–	0	.561
Western Kentucky ‍‍‍	15	–	17	–	0	.469	27	–	29	–	0	.482
FIU ‍‍‍	11	–	19	–	0	.367	20	–	31	–	0	.392
Marshall ‍‍‍	6	–	26	–	0	.188	10	–	35	–	0	.222
West
No. 22 Louisiana Tech ^{x}‍‍‍^{y}	22	–	8	–	0	.733	42	–	20	–	0	.677
No. 23 Southern Miss ‍‍‍^{y}	22	–	9	–	0	.710	40	–	21	–	0	.656
UTSA ‍‍‍	14	–	17	–	0	.452	22	–	26	–	0	.458
Middle Tennessee ‍‍‍	12	–	19	–	1	.391	24	–	29	–	1	.454
Rice ‍‍‍	11	–	20	–	1	.359	23	–	29	–	1	.443
UAB ‍‍‍	11	–	21	–	0	.344	18	–	36	–	0	.333
x – Division champion ‡ – Tournament champion y – Invited to the NCAA tournament As of June 7, 2021; Rankings from D1Baseball

The 2021 Rice Owls baseball team represented Rice University in the sport of baseball for the 2021 college baseball season. The Owls competed in Division I of the National Collegiate Athletic Association (NCAA) and in Conference USA West Division. They played their home games at Reckling Park in Houston, Texas. The team was coached by Matt Bragga, who was in his third season with the Owls.

For the first time since joining Conference USA in 2005, Rice did not qualify for this season's conference tournament. The Owl's broke their 14-year appearance in the tournament. On May 24, 2021, Rice announced that coach Bragga was relieved from his coaching duties.

== Preseason ==
=== C-USA media poll ===
The Conference USA preseason poll was released on February 11, 2021 with the Owls predicted to finish in third place in the West Division.

Media poll (West)
Predicted finish	Team	1st Place Votes
1	Southern Miss	10
2	Louisiana Tech	2
3	Rice	-
4	Middle Tennessee	-
5	UTSA	-
6	UAB	-

=== Preseason All-CUSA team ===
- Braden Comeaux – Infielder

== Schedule and results ==
2021 Rice Owl baseball game log
Regular season (23–29–1)

February (2–4)
Date	Opponent	Site/stadium	Score	Attendance	Overall record	C-USA record
February 19	Little Rock	Reckling Park; Houston, TX	Canceled			
February 20	Houston Baptist	Reckling Park	L 7-8^{10}	994	0-1	-
February 20	Washington	Reckling Park	Canceled			
February 21	Houston Baptist	Reckling Park	W 9-3	946	1-1	-
February 22	Houston Baptist	Reckling Park	W 1-0	835	2-1	-
February 24	at Lamar	Vincent–Beck Stadium; Beaumont, TX	Canceled			
February 26	at Louisiana	M. L. Tigue Moore Field at Russo Park; Lafayette, LA	L 3-7	890	2-2	-
February 27	at Louisiana	M. L. Tigue Moore Field at Russo Park	L 3-5	911	2-3	-
February 28	at Louisiana	M. L. Tigue Moore Field at Russo Park	L 3-6	761	2-4	-

March (10–8)
Date	Opponent	Site/stadium	Score	Attendance	Overall record	C-USA record
March 3	Prairie View A&M	Reckling Park; Houston, TX	W 10-0	912	3-4	-
Shriners Hospitals For Children College Classic
March 5	vs. Sam Houston State	Minute Maid Park; Houston, TX	L 4-12		3-5	-
March 6	vs. Texas A&M–Corpus Christi	Minute Maid Park	W 16-5	1,000	4-5	-
March 7	vs. Texas State	Minute Maid Park	L 1-9	2,255	4-6	-
March 9	Houston Baptist	Reckling Park	W 3-1	923	5-6	-
March 12	Northern Illinois	Reckling Park	W 6-3	1,043	6-6	-
March 13 (1)	Kansas State	Reckling Park	L 3-8	1,238	6-7	-
March 13 (2)	Northern Illinois	Reckling Park	W 4-1	858	7-7	-
March 14	Kansas State	Reckling Park	W 1-0	1,041	8-7	-
March 17	at Texas State	Bobcat Ballpark; San Marcos, TX	L 5-16^{7}	700	8-8	-
March 19	Southern	Reckling Park	W 14-2	1,131	9-8	-
March 20	Southern	Reckling Park	W 13-4	1,079	10-8	-
March 21	Southern	Reckling Park	L 4-6	1,012	10-9	-
March 23	at Texas A&M	Blue Bell Park; College State, TX	W 2-1	1,334	11-9	-
March 26	UTSA	Reckling Park	L 4-16	1,220	11-10	0-1
March 27 (1)	UTSA	Reckling Park	W 10-8	1,009	12-10	1-1
March 27 (2)	UTSA	Reckling Park	L 1-4	1,171	12-11	1-2
March 28	UTSA	Reckling Park	L 3-11	1,059	12-12	1-3

April (6–12–1)
Date	Opponent	Site/stadium	Score	Attendance	Overall record	C-USA record
April 1	at Middle Tennessee	Reese Smith Jr. Field; Murfreesboro, TN	L 1-4	200	12-13	1-4
April 2 (1)	at Middle Tennessee	Reese Smith Jr. Field	L 3-4^{9}	200	12-14	1-5
April 2 (2)	at Middle Tennessee	Reese Smith Jr. Field	W 4-1^{7}	200	13-14	2-5
April 3	at Middle Tennessee	Reese Smith Jr. Field	T 9-9^{12}	200	13-14-1	2-5-1
April 9	No. 16 Louisiana Tech	Reckling Park; Houston, TX	L 0-6	1,179	13-15-1	2-6-1
April 10 (1)	No. 16 Louisiana Tech	Reckling Park	L 6-7^{7}	952	13-16-1	2-7-1
April 10 (2)	No. 16 Louisiana Tech	Reckling Park	L 6-20^{7}	1,158	13-17-1	2-8-1
April 11	No. 16 Louisiana Tech	Reckling Park	L 4-13	1,180	13-18-1	2-9-1
April 13	Incarnate Word	Reckling Park	W 15-12^{10}	1,045	14-18-1	-
April 16	at No. 22 Old Dominion	Bud Metheny Baseball Complex; Norfolk, VA	L 4-11	402	14-19-1	2-10-1
April 17 (1)	at No. 22 Old Dominion	Bud Metheny Baseball Complex	L 2-11^{7}	402	14-20-1	2-11-1
April 17 (2)	at No. 22 Old Dominion	Bud Metheny Baseball Complex	W 11-2^{7}	270	15-20-1	3-11-1
April 18	at No. 22 Old Dominion	Bud Metheny Baseball Complex	L 1-4	278	15-21-1	3-12-1
April 23	at UTSA	Roadrunner Field; San Antonio, TX	W 8-6	124	16-21-1	4-12-1
April 24 (1)	at UTSA	Roadrunner Field	W 5-4^{7}		17-21-1	5-12-1
April 24 (2)	at UTSA	Roadrunner Field	L 6-12^{7}	127	17-22-1	5-13-1
April 25	at UTSA	Roadrunner Field	L 4-12	136	17-23-1	5-14-1
April 30 (1)	No. 23 Southern Miss	Reckling Park	W 6-0^{7}	872	18-23-1	6-14-1
April 30 (2)	No. 23 Southern Miss	Reckling Park	L 1-12^{7}	1,064	18-24-1	6-15-1

May (5–5)
Date	Opponent	Site/stadium	Score	Attendance	Overall record	C-USA record
May 1 (1)	No. 23 Southern Miss	Reckling Park; Houston, TX	L 1-10	1,157	18-25-1	6-16-1
May 1 (2)	No. 23 Southern Miss	Reckling Park	L 1-8	1,115	18-26-1	6-17-1
May 7	at UAB	Jerry D. Young Memorial Field; Birmingham, AL	W 6-1	80	19-26-1	7-17-1
May 8 (1)	at UAB	Jerry D. Young Memorial Field	L 1-2^{7}	80	19-27-1	7-18-1
May 8 (2)	at UAB	Jerry D. Young Memorial Field	W 7-0^{7}	80	20-27-1	8-18-1
May 9	at UAB	Jerry D. Young Memorial Field	W 10-5	80	21-27-1	9-18-1
May 14	No. 20 Charlotte	Reckling Park	L 6-9	989	21-28-1	9-19-1
May 15 (1)	No. 20 Charlotte	Reckling Park	W 11-8^{7}	1,146	22-28-1	10-19-1
May 15 (2)	No. 20 Charlotte	Reckling Park	L 4-6^{6}	1,330	22-29-1	10-20-1
May 16	No. 20 Charlotte	Reckling Park	W 6-0^{5}	1,359	23-29-1	11-20-1
May 18	at Texas	UFCU Disch–Falk Field; Austin, TX	Canceled			

Schedule source:

*Rankings are based on the team's current ranking in the D1Baseball poll.
