= 2021 Marshall Thundering Herd baseball team =

Baseball team season

2021 Marshall Thundering Herd baseball
- Conference: Conference USA
- East Division
- Record: 10-35 (6-26 C-USA)
- Head coach: Jeff Waggoner
- Assistant coaches: Joe Renner; Brian Karlet; Tyler Ladendorf
- Home stadium: Kennedy Center Field

2021 Conference USA baseball standings
	Conf.						Overall
Team	W		L		T	PCT	W		L		T	PCT
East
Charlotte ^{x}‍‍‍^{y}	24	–	8	–	0	.750	40	–	21	–	0	.656
No. 16 Old Dominion ‍‍‡‍^{y}	22	–	10	–	0	.688	44	–	16	–	0	.733
Florida Atlantic ‍‍‍	18	–	14	–	0	.563	32	–	25	–	0	.561
Western Kentucky ‍‍‍	15	–	17	–	0	.469	27	–	29	–	0	.482
FIU ‍‍‍	11	–	19	–	0	.367	20	–	31	–	0	.392
Marshall ‍‍‍	6	–	26	–	0	.188	10	–	35	–	0	.222
West
No. 22 Louisiana Tech ^{x}‍‍‍^{y}	22	–	8	–	0	.733	42	–	20	–	0	.677
No. 23 Southern Miss ‍‍‍^{y}	22	–	9	–	0	.710	40	–	21	–	0	.656
UTSA ‍‍‍	14	–	17	–	0	.452	22	–	26	–	0	.458
Middle Tennessee ‍‍‍	12	–	19	–	1	.391	24	–	29	–	1	.454
Rice ‍‍‍	11	–	20	–	1	.359	23	–	29	–	1	.443
UAB ‍‍‍	11	–	21	–	0	.344	18	–	36	–	0	.333
x – Division champion ‡ – Tournament champion y – Invited to the NCAA tournament As of June 7, 2021; Rankings from D1Baseball

The 2021 Marshall Thundering Herd baseball team represented Marshall University in the sport of baseball for the 2021 college baseball season. The Thundering Herd competed in Division I of the National Collegiate Athletic Association (NCAA) and in Conference USA East Division. They played their home games at Kennedy Center Field in Huntington, West Virginia. The team was coached by Jeff Waggoner, who was in his fifteenth season with the Thundering Herd.

== Preseason ==
=== C-USA media poll ===
The Conference USA preseason poll was released on February 11, 2021 with the Thundering Herd predicted to finish in last place (7th) in the East Division.

Media poll (East)
Predicted finish	Team	1st Place Votes
1	Florida Atlantic	10
2	Old Dominion	1
3	FIU	1
4	WKU	-
5	Charlotte	-
6	Marshall	-

== Schedule and results ==
2021 Marshall Thundering Herd baseball game log
Regular season (10–35)

March (4–11)
Date	Opponent	Site/stadium	Score	Attendance	Overall record	C-USA record
March 5	Morehead State	Kennedy Center Field; Huntington, WV	W 3-1	70	1-0	-
March 6	at Morehead State	Allen Field; Morehead, KY	L 10-13	204	1-1	-
March 7	Morehead State	Kennedy Center Field	L 2-6	53	1-2	-
March 9	at West Virginia	Monongalia County Ballpark; Granville, WV	Postponed			
March 9	at Eastern Kentucky	Turkey Hughes Field; Richmond, KY	L 1-2	257	1-3	-
March 12–14	at Ohio	Bob Wren Stadium; Athens, OH	Canceled			
March 12	at Mercer	OrthoGeorgia Park; Macon, GA	L 1-3	400	1-4	-
March 13	at Mercer	OrthoGeorgia Park	W 11-0	400	2-4	-
March 14	at Mercer	OrthoGeorgia Park	W 19-9	400	3-4	-
March 19	at Southern Illinois	Itchy Jones Stadium; Carbondale, IL	L 4-10		3-5	-
March 20	at Southern Illinois	Itchy Jones Stadium	L 2-7		3-6	-
March 21	at Southern Illinois	Itchy Jones Stadium	L 0-2		3-7	-
March 23	West Virginia	Kennedy Center Field	W 7-1	103	4-7	-
March 26	at Florida Atlantic	FAU Baseball Stadium; Boca Raton, FL	L 0-12	286	4-8	0-1
March 27 (1)	at Florida Atlantic	FAU Baseball Stadium	L 3-5	286	4-9	0-2
March 27 (2)	at Florida Atlantic	FAU Baseball Stadium	L 6-7	286	4-10	0-3
March 28	at Florid Atlantic	FAU Baseball Stadium	L 2-11	286	4-11	0-4

April (4–14)
Date	Opponent	Site/stadium	Score	Attendance	Overall record	C-USA record
April 2	Old Dominion	Kennedy Center Field; Huntington, WV	L 1-12	61	4-12	0-5
April 3 (1)	Old Dominion	Kennedy Center Field	L 7-8	53	4-13	0-6
April 3 (2)	Old Dominion	Kennedy Center Field	L 0-8	53	4-14	0-7
April 4	Old Dominion	Kennedy Center Field	L 7-15	59	4-15	0-8
April 9 (1)	at Western Kentucky	Nick Denes Field; Bowling Green, KY	L 0-1	89	4-16	0-9
April 9 (2)	at Western Kentucky	Nick Denes Field	L 1-5	183	4-17	0-10
April 10	at Western Kentucky	Nick Denes Field	L 2-5	153	4-18	0-11
April 11	at Western Kentucky	Nick Denes Field	L 1-8	173	4-19	0-12
April 14	at West Virginia	Monongalia County Ballpark; Granville, WV	L 3-9	600	4-20	-
April 16	FIU	Kennedy Center Field	L 2-8	67	4-21	0-13
April 17 (1)	FIU	Kennedy Center Field	W 6-1	53	5-21	1-13
April 17 (2)	FIU	Kennedy Center Field	L 0-5	53	5-22	1-14
April 18	FIU	Kennedy Center Field	W 10-8	57	6-22	2-14
April 23	at No. 14 Louisiana Tech	Pat Patterson Park; Ruston, LA	L 3-4	1,000	6-23	2-15
April 24 (1)	at No. 14 Louisiana Tech	Pat Patterson Park	L 4-11	1,000	6-24	2-16
April 24 (2)	at No. 14 Louisiana Tech	Pat Patterson Park	W 11-5	1,000	7-24	3-16
April 25	at No. 14 Louisiana Tech	Pat Patterson Park	W 7-2	1,000	8-24	4-16
April 30	Western Kentucky	Kennedy Center Field	L 6-10	61	8-25	4-17

May (2–10)
Date	Opponent	Site/stadium	Score	Attendance	Overall record	C-USA record
May 1 (1)	Western Kentucky	Kennedy Center Field; Huntington, WV	L 1-6	63	8-26	4-18
May 1 (2)	Western Kentucky	Kennedy Center Field	L 5-15	61	8-27	4-19
May 2	Western Kentucky	Kennedy Center Field	L 6-10	57	8-28	4-20
May 7	at No. 23 Charlotte	Hayes Stadium; Charlotte, NC	L 5-7	183	8-29	4-21
May 8 (1)	at No. 23 Charlotte	Hayes Stadium	L 8-10		8-30	4-22
May 8 (2)	at No. 23 Charlotte	Hayes Stadium	L 3-12	205	8-31	4-23
May 9	at No. 23 Charlotte	Hayes Stadium	L 3-6	168	8-32	4-24
May 11	at West Virginia	Monongalia County Ballpark; Granville, WV	L 1-4	600	8-33	-
May 14	UAB	Kennedy Center Field	W 8-6	47	9-33	5-24
May 15 (1)	UAB	Kennedy Center Field	L 0-9	53	9-34	5-25
May 15 (2)	UAB	Kennedy Center Field	L 0-6	53	9-35	5-26
May 16	UAB	Kennedy Center Field	W 7-5	48	10-35	6-26

Legend: = Win = Loss = Cancelled/Postponed

Schedule source:

*Rankings are based on the team's current ranking in the D1Baseball poll.
