= 2021 Charlotte 49ers baseball team =

Baseball team season

2021 Charlotte 49ers baseball
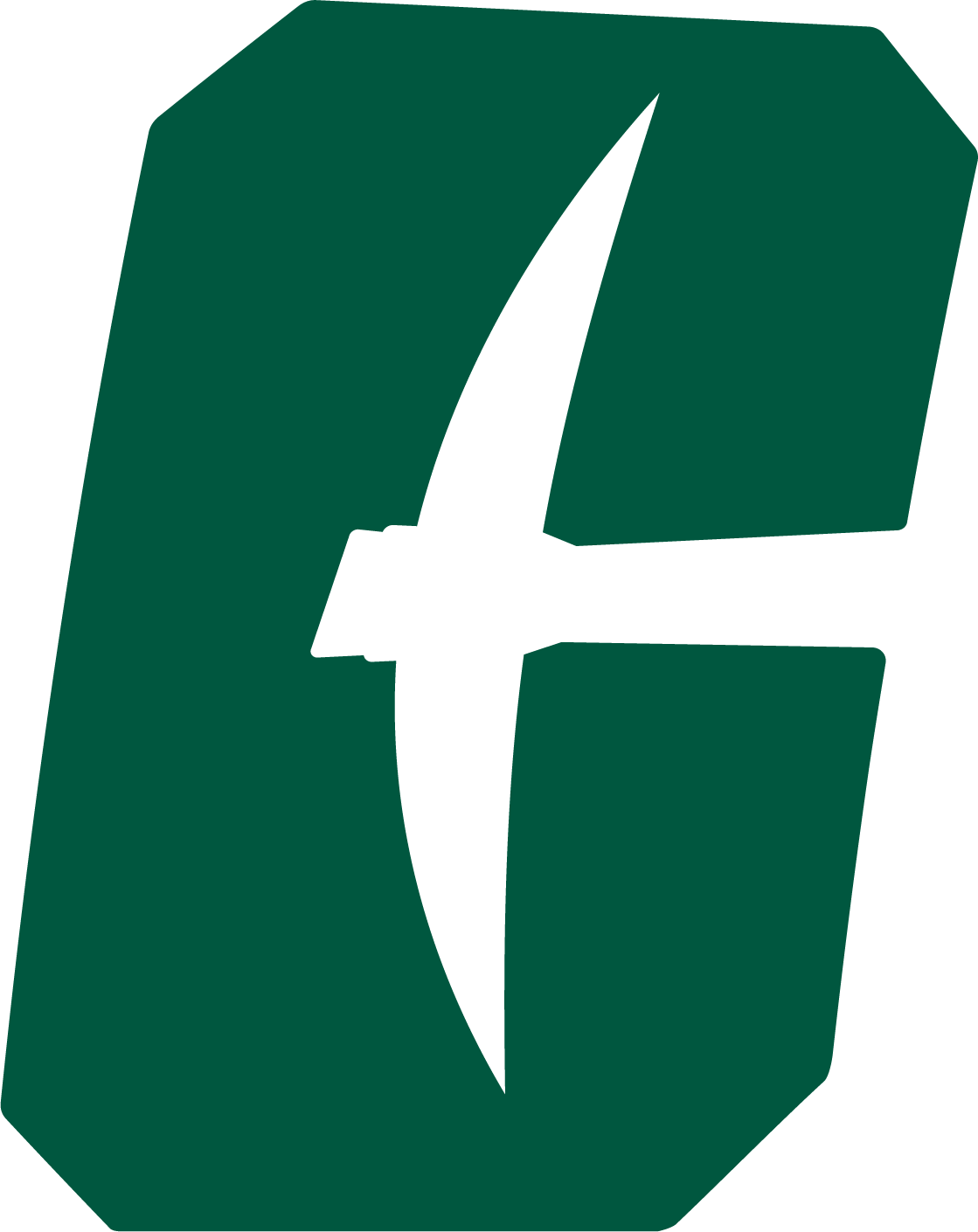

C-USA East Division champions
- Conference: Conference USA
- East Division
- Record: 40–21 (24–8 C-USA)
- Head coach: Robert Woodard
- Associate head coach: Bo Robinson
- Assistant coaches: Toby Bicknell; Austin Meine
- Home stadium: Robert and Mariam Hayes Stadium

2021 Conference USA baseball standings
	Conf.						Overall
Team	W		L		T	PCT	W		L		T	PCT
East
Charlotte ^{x}‍‍‍^{y}	24	–	8	–	0	.750	40	–	21	–	0	.656
No. 16 Old Dominion ‍‍‡‍^{y}	22	–	10	–	0	.688	44	–	16	–	0	.733
Florida Atlantic ‍‍‍	18	–	14	–	0	.563	32	–	25	–	0	.561
Western Kentucky ‍‍‍	15	–	17	–	0	.469	27	–	29	–	0	.482
FIU ‍‍‍	11	–	19	–	0	.367	20	–	31	–	0	.392
Marshall ‍‍‍	6	–	26	–	0	.188	10	–	35	–	0	.222
West
No. 22 Louisiana Tech ^{x}‍‍‍^{y}	22	–	8	–	0	.733	42	–	20	–	0	.677
No. 23 Southern Miss ‍‍‍^{y}	22	–	9	–	0	.710	40	–	21	–	0	.656
UTSA ‍‍‍	14	–	17	–	0	.452	22	–	26	–	0	.458
Middle Tennessee ‍‍‍	12	–	19	–	1	.391	24	–	29	–	1	.454
Rice ‍‍‍	11	–	20	–	1	.359	23	–	29	–	1	.443
UAB ‍‍‍	11	–	21	–	0	.344	18	–	36	–	0	.333
x – Division champion ‡ – Tournament champion y – Invited to the NCAA tournament As of June 7, 2021; Rankings from D1Baseball

The 2021 Charlotte 49ers baseball team represented the University of North Carolina at Charlotte in the sport of baseball for the 2021 college baseball season. The 49ers competed in Division I of the National Collegiate Athletic Association (NCAA) and in Conference USA East Division. They played their home games at Robert and Mariam Hayes Stadium, on the university's Charlotte campus. The team was coached by Robert Woodard, who was in his second season with the 49ers.

== Preseason ==
=== C-USA media poll ===
The Conference USA preseason poll was released on February 11, 2021, with the 49ers predicted to finish in fifth place in the East Division.

Media poll (East)
Predicted finish	Team	1st Place Votes
1	Florida Atlantic	10
2	Old Dominion	1
3	FIU	1
4	WKU	-
5	Charlotte	-
6	Marshall	-

== Schedule and results ==
2021 Charlotte 49ers baseball game log
Regular season (39–17)

February (6–0)
Date	Opponent	Site/stadium	Score	Attendance	Overall record	C-USA record
February 19	Morehead State	Hayes Stadium; Charlotte, NC	W 12-4		1-0	-
February 20	Morehead State	Hayes Stadium	W 18-3		2-0	-
February 21	Morehead State	Hayes Stadium	W 4-2		3-0	-
February 27 (1)	William & Mary	Hayes Stadium	W 7-1		4-0	-
February 27 (2)	William & Mary	Hayes Stadium	W 4-0	127	5-0	-
February 28	William & Mary	Hayes Stadium	W 20-4	120	6-0	-

March (8–9)
Date	Opponent	Site/stadium	Score	Attendance	Overall record	C-USA record
March 2	at UNC Greensboro	UNCG Baseball Stadium; Greensboro, NC	L 7-9	250	6-1	-
March 5	Western Carolina	Hayes Stadium; Charlotte, NC	W 7-4	94	7-1	-
March 6	Western Carolina	Hayes Stadium	L 2-5	122	7-2	-
March 7	Western Carolina	Hayes Stadium	L 5-10	123	7-3	-
March 9	No. 15 Tennessee	Hayes Stadium	W 9-0	145	8-3	-
March 12	at No. 14 East Carolina	Clark–LeClair Stadium; Greenville, NC	L 4-7	1,181	8-4	-
March 13	at No. 14 East Carolina	Clark–LeClair Stadium	L 1-3	1,203	8-5	-
March 14	at No. 14 East Carolina	Clark–LeClair Stadium	L 1-3	1,122	8-6	-
March 16	at Wake Forest	David F. Couch Ballpark; Winston-Salem, NC	L 1-4	100	8-7	-
March 19–21	College of Charleston	Hayes Stadium	Canceled			
March 20 (1)	vs. Rhode Island	Truist Field; Charlotte, NC	W 2-1^{10}		9-7	-
March 20 (2)	vs. Rhode Island	Truist Field	L 3-6	1,734	9-8	-
March 21	vs. Rhode Island	Truist Field	W 6-3	121	10-8	-
March 23	vs. Appalachian State	Atrium Health Ballpark; Kannapolis, NC	W 15-5	1,648	11-8	-
March 26	at Western Kentucky	Nick Denes Field; Bowling Green, KY	W 7-4	213	12-8	1–0
March 27 (1)	at Western Kentucky	Nick Denes Field	W 6-0	157	13-8	2–0
March 27 (2)	at Western Kentucky	Nick Denes Field	W 5-4^{8}	161	14-8	3–0
March 28	at Western Kentucky	Nick Denes Field	L 16-17^{10}	213	14-9	3–1

April (16–3)
Date	Opponent	Rank	Site/stadium	Score	Attendance	Overall record	C-USA record
April 2	Florida Atlantic		Hayes Stadium; Charlotte, NC	W 9-5	128	15-9	4–1
April 3 (1)	Florida Atlantic		Hayes Stadium	W 9-8^{8}	138	16-9	5–1
April 3 (2)	Florida Atlantic		Hayes Stadium	W 5-4	150	17-9	6–1
April 4	Florida Atlantic		Hayes Stadium	W 11-10	112	18-9	7–1
April 9	at FIU		Infinity Insurance Park; Miami, FL	W 11-8		19-9	8–1
April 10 (1)	at FIU		Infinity Insurance Park	W 5-4		20-9	9–1
April 10 (2)	at FIU		Infinity Insurance Park	W 3-1		21-9	10–1
April 11	at FIU		Infinity Insurance Park	W 9-5		22-9	11–1
April 13	at North Carolina	No. 21	Boshamer Stadium; Chapel Hill, NC	Postponed			
April 16	UTSA	No. 21	Hayes Stadium	W 6-2	156	23-9	12–1
April 17 (1)	UTSA	No. 21	Hayes Stadium	W 10-6		24-9	13–1
April 17 (2)	UTSA	No. 21	Hayes Stadium	W 11-10	136	25-9	14–1
April 18	UTSA	No. 21	Hayes Stadium	L 5-11^{10}	126	25-10	14–2
April 20	at Appalachian State	No. 19	Beaver Field at Jim and Bettie Smith Stadium; Boone, NC	W 11-8	190	26-10	-
April 23 (1)	No. 20 Old Dominion	No. 19	Hayes Stadium	W 5-4		27-10	15–2
April 23 (2)	No. 20 Old Dominion	No. 19	Hayes Stadium	L 5-9	164	27-11	15–3
April 25 (1)	No. 20 Old Dominion	No. 19	Hayes Stadium	W 8-3		28-11	16–3
April 25 (2)	No. 20 Old Dominion	No. 19	Hayes Stadium	W 7-1	163	29-11	17–3
April 27	at North Carolina	No. 15	Boshamer Stadium	W 4-1^{10}	850	30-11	-
April 30	at No. 25 Old Dominion	No. 15	Bud Metheny Baseball Complex; Norfolk, VA	L 3-8	492	30-12	17–4

May (9–5)
Date	Opponent	Rank	Site/stadium	Score	Attendance	Overall record	C-USA record
May 1 (1)	at No. 25 Old Dominion	No. 15	Bud Metheny Baseball Complex; Norfolk, VA	W 6-2	503	31-12	18–4
May 1 (2)	at No. 25 Old Dominion	No. 15	Bud Metheny Baseball Complex	L 2-14	386	31-13	18–5
May 2	at No. 25 Old Dominion	No. 15	Bud Metheny Baseball Complex	L 0-10	446	31-14	18–6
May 7	Marshall	No. 23	Hayes Stadium; Charlotte, NC	W 7-5	183	32-14	19–6
May 8 (1)	Marshall	No. 23	Hayes Stadium	W 10-8		33-14	20–6
May 8 (2)	Marshall	No. 23	Hayes Stadium	W 12-3	205	34-14	21–6
May 9	Marshall	No. 23	Hayes Stadium	W 6-3	168	35-14	22–6
May 14	at Rice	No. 20	Reckling Park; Houston, TX	W 9-6	989	36-14	23–6
May 15 (1)	at Rice	No. 20	Reckling Park	L 8-11	1,146	36-15	23–7
May 15 (2)	at Rice	No. 20	Reckling Park	W 6-4^{9}	1,330	37-15	24–7
May 16	at Rice	No. 20	Reckling Park	L 0-6^{5}	1,359	37-16	24–8
May 20	UNC Wilmington	No. 22	Hayes Stadium	L 2-6	464	37-17	-
May 21	UNC Wilmington	No. 22	Hayes Stadium	W 6-5	717	38-17	-
May 22	UNC Wilmington	No. 22	Hayes Stadium	W 15-14	604	39-17	-

Postseason (1–4)

C-USA Tournament (0–2)
Date	Opponent	Rank (Seed)	Site/stadium	Score	Attendance	Overall record	Tournament record
May 26	vs. (8) Middle Tennessee	No. 22 (1)	Pat Patterson Park; Ruston, LA	L 2-7		39-18	0–1
May 27	vs. (5) Florida Atlantic	No. 22 (1)	Pat Patterson Park	L 8-9		39-19	0–2

NCAA Greenville Regional (1–2)
Date	Opponent	Rank (Seed)	Site/stadium	Score	Attendance	Overall record	Tournament record
June 4	vs. No. 24 (3) Maryland	(2)	Clark–LeClair Stadium; Greenville, NC	W 13-10	4,174	40-19	1–0
June 5	at No. 12 (1) East Carolina	(2)	Clark–LeClair Stadium	L 5-7	5,020	40-20	1-1
June 6	vs. No. 24 (3) Maryland	(2)	Clark–LeClair Stadium	L 1-2		40-21	1–2

Legend: = Win = Loss = Cancelled/Postponed

Schedule source:

*Rankings are based on the team's current ranking in the D1Baseball poll.

== Roster ==
2021 Charlotte 49ers roster
Pitchers: 19 - Bryce McGowan - Sophomore; 21 - Colby Bruce - Senior; 26 - Austin Marozas - Sophomore; 27 - Christian Lothes - Freshman; 29 - Nick Turnbull - Senior; 30 - Trae Starnes - Junior; 32 - Andrew Lindsey - Sophomore; 34 - Ryan Czanstkowski - Senior; 37 - Andrew Roach - Junior; 38 - Jackson Boss - (redshirt) Junior; 41 - Matt Brooks - (redshirt) Junior; 43 - Hale Sims - Sophomore; 46 - Jake Curry - Sophomore; 47 - Tyson Tucker - Sophomore; 48 - Sam Grace - Sophomore; 50 - Casey Bargo - Sophomore; 51 - Kolton Scherbenske - Sophomore; 53 - Gus Hughes - Freshman; 54 - Spencer Giesting - Freshman; 56 - Tyler Parks - Freshman; 57 - Zach Zedalis - Sophomore	Catchers: 8 - Tyler Cotten - Freshman; 12 - Aaron McKeithan - Sophomore; 44 - Jacob Whitley - (redshirt) Junior; Infielders: 2 - Carson Johnson - Senior; 3 - Dante DeFranco - Freshman; 6 - Jack Dragum - Sophomore; 11 - Chandler Riley - Freshman; 13 - Thomas Caufield - Sophomore; 14 - Austin Knight - Sophomore; 16 - Nate Furman - Freshman; 18 - Will Butcher - Freshman; 23 - Gino Groover - Freshman; 24 - David McCabe - Freshman; 36 - Rafi Vazquez - Senior	Outfielders: 1 - Parker Stinnett - Sophomore; 9 - Craig Keuchel - Junior; 17 - Todd Elwood - Senior; 22 - Dominic Pilolli - Freshman; 33 - Jake Cunningham - Freshman; 45 - Hunter Baker - Sophomore

== Rankings ==
Ranking movements Legend: ██ Increase in ranking ██ Decrease in ranking — = Not ranked RV = Received votes
	Week																		
Poll	Pre	1	2	3	4	5	6	7	8	9	10	11	12	13	14	15	16	17	Final
Coaches'	—	—*	—	—	—	—	—	RV	RV	21	17	22	20	19	19	25	25*	25*	RV
Baseball America	—	—	—	—	—	—	—	—	—	—	19	21	19	16	16	25	25*	25*	—
Collegiate Baseball^	—	—	—	—	—	—	—	—	—	29	25	—	24	24	23	29	—	—	—
NCBWA†	—	RV	RV	—	—	—	—	RV	28	24	17	20	18	19	17	24	29	29*	28
D1Baseball	—	—	—	—	—	—	—	—	21	19	15	23	20	22	22	—	—*	—*	—

^ Collegiate Baseball ranked 40 teams in their preseason poll, but only ranked 30 teams weekly during the season.
† NCBWA ranks 30 teams in their preseason poll, but only ranks 25 teams weekly during the season.
* A new poll was not released for this week, so for comparison purposes, the previous week's ranking is inserted in this week's slot.
