= 2021 Southern Miss Golden Eagles baseball team =

Baseball team season

2021 Southern Miss Golden Eagles baseball
- Conference: Conference USA
- West Division

Ranking
- Coaches: No. 23
- Record: 40–21 (22–9 C-USA)
- Head coach: Scott Berry
- Assistant coaches: Christian Ostrander; Travis Creel; Nick Ammirati
- Home stadium: Pete Taylor Park

2021 Conference USA baseball standings
	Conf.						Overall
Team	W		L		T	PCT	W		L		T	PCT
East
Charlotte ^{x}‍‍‍^{y}	24	–	8	–	0	.750	40	–	21	–	0	.656
No. 16 Old Dominion ‍‍‡‍^{y}	22	–	10	–	0	.688	44	–	16	–	0	.733
Florida Atlantic ‍‍‍	18	–	14	–	0	.563	32	–	25	–	0	.561
Western Kentucky ‍‍‍	15	–	17	–	0	.469	27	–	29	–	0	.482
FIU ‍‍‍	11	–	19	–	0	.367	20	–	31	–	0	.392
Marshall ‍‍‍	6	–	26	–	0	.188	10	–	35	–	0	.222
West
No. 22 Louisiana Tech ^{x}‍‍‍^{y}	22	–	8	–	0	.733	42	–	20	–	0	.677
No. 23 Southern Miss ‍‍‍^{y}	22	–	9	–	0	.710	40	–	21	–	0	.656
UTSA ‍‍‍	14	–	17	–	0	.452	22	–	26	–	0	.458
Middle Tennessee ‍‍‍	12	–	19	–	1	.391	24	–	29	–	1	.454
Rice ‍‍‍	11	–	20	–	1	.359	23	–	29	–	1	.443
UAB ‍‍‍	11	–	21	–	0	.344	18	–	36	–	0	.333
x – Division champion ‡ – Tournament champion y – Invited to the NCAA tournament As of June 7, 2021; Rankings from D1Baseball

Southern Miss logo

The 2021 Southern Miss Golden Eagles baseball team represented the University of Southern Mississippi in the sport of baseball for the 2021 college baseball season. The Golden Eagles competed in Division I of the National Collegiate Athletic Association (NCAA) and in Conference USA West Division. They played their home games at Pete Taylor Park in Hattiesburg, Mississippi. The team was coached by Scott Berry, who was in his twelfth season with the Golden Eagles.

== Preseason ==
=== Preseason All-American teams ===
2nd Team

- Walker Powell – Right Hand Pitcher (Collegiate Baseball)

=== C-USA media poll ===
The Conference USA preseason poll was released on February 11, 2021 with the Golden Eagles predicted to finish first in the West Division.

Media poll (West)
Predicted finish	Team	1st Place Votes
1	Southern Miss	10
2	Louisiana Tech	2
3	Rice	-
4	Middle Tennessee	-
5	UTSA	-
6	UAB	-

=== Preseason CUSA Pitcher of the Year ===
- Walker Powell – Senior, Right Hand Pitcher

=== Preseason All-CUSA team ===
- Gabe Shepard – Starting Pitcher
- Walker Powell – Starting Pitcher
- Hunter Stanley – Relief Pitcher
- Gabe Montenegro – Outfielder

== Schedule and results ==
2021 Southern Miss Golden Eagles baseball game log
Regular season (35–17)

February (4–3)
Date	Opponent	Site/stadium	Score	Attendance	Overall record	C-USA record
February 21(1)	Northwestern State	Pete Taylor Park; Hattiesburg, MS	W 5-1		1-0	-
February 21(2)	Northwestern State	Pete Taylor Park	L 1-7		1-1	-
February 22	Northwestern State	Pete Taylor Park	W 10-0^{7}		2-1	-
February 23	at South Alabama	Eddie Stanky Field; Mobile, AL	L 3-5	850	2-2	-
February 26	UConn	Pete Taylor Park	W 6-5		3-2	-
February 27	UConn	Pete Taylor Park	W 7-6		4-2	-
February 28	UConn	Pete Taylor Park	L 7-10		4-3	-

March (10–6)
Date	Opponent	Site/stadium	Score	Attendance	Overall record	C-USA record
March 3	vs. No. 3 Mississippi State	Trustmark Park; Pearl, MS	L 1-4	3,675	4-4	-
March 5	at Jacksonville State	Rudy Abbott Field; Jacksonville, AL	L 0-6	458	4-5	-
March 6	at Jacksonville State	Rudy Abbott Field	W 6-0	506	5-5	-
March 7	at Jacksonville State	Rudy Abbott Field	W 3-1	550	6-5	-
March 12	Louisiana	Pete Taylor Park; Hattiesburg, MS	W 13-4		7-5	-
March 13	Louisiana	Pete Taylor Park	W 1-0		8-5	-
March 14	Louisiana	Pete Taylor Park	W 6-3^{11}		9-5	-
March 16	at South Alabama	Eddie Stanky Field; Mobile, AL	L 2-8	850	9-6	-
March 19	Missouri State	Pete Taylor Park	W 2-1		10-6	-
March 20	Missouri State	Pete Taylor Park	W 5-0		11-6	-
March 21	Missouri State	Pete Taylor Park	W 3-1		12-6	-
March 23	at Alabama	Sewell–Thomas Stadium; Tuscaloosa, AL	W 5-4	1,746	13-6	-
March 26	No. 23 Louisiana Tech	Pete Taylor Park	L 2-3		13-7	0-1
March 27 (1)	No. 23 Louisiana Tech	Pete Taylor Park	W 14-6^{7}		14-7	1-1
March 27 (2)	No. 23 Louisiana Tech	Pete Taylor Park	L 0-4		14-8	1-2
March 28	No. 23 Louisiana Tech	Pete Taylor Park	L 7-8		14-9	1-3

April (13–5)
Date	Opponent	Rank	Site/stadium	Score	Attendance	Overall record	C-USA record
April 1	at UTSA		Roadrunner Field; San Antonio, TX	W 9-1	114	15-9	2-3
April 2 (1)	at UTSA		Roadrunner Field	W 13-9		16-9	3-3
April 2 (2)	at UTSA		Roadrunner Field	W 11-5	114	17-9	4-3
April 3	at UTSA		Roadrunner Field	Canceled			
April 9	UAB		Pete Taylor Park; Hattiesburg, MS	W 7-2		18-9	5-3
April 10 (1)	UAB		Pete Taylor Park	W 4-1		19-9	6-3
April 10 (2)	UAB		Pete Taylor Park	W 9-2		20-9	7-3
April 11	UAB		Pete Taylor Park	W 14-4^{8}		21-9	8-3
April 13	South Alabama		Pete Taylor Park	L 0-4		21-10	-
April 17 (1)	at No. 14 Louisiana Tech		Pat Patterson Park; Ruston, LA	W 4-3	1,000	22-10	9-3
April 17 (2)	at No. 14 Louisiana Tech		Pat Patterson Park	L 3-5	1,000	22-11	9-4
April 18 (1)	at No. 14 Louisiana Tech		Pat Patterson Park	W 12-11	1,000	23-11	10-4
April 18 (2)	at No. 14 Louisiana Tech		Pat Patterson Park	L 6-7	1,000	23-12	10-5
April 23	Western Kentucky		Pete Taylor Park	W 6-5		24-12	11-5
April 24 (1)	Western Kentucky		Pete Taylor Park	W 6-5		25-12	12-5
April 24 (2)	Western Kentucky		Pete Taylor Park	W 3-0		26-12	13-5
April 25	Western Kentucky		Pete Taylor Park	L 4-9		26-13	13-6
April 30 (1)	at Rice	No. 23	Reckling Park; Houston, TX	L 0-6		26-14	13-7
April 30 (2)	at Rice	No. 23	Reckling Park	W 12-1	1,064	27-14	14-7

May (8–3)
Date	Opponent	Rank	Site/stadium	Score	Attendance	Overall record	C-USA record
May 1 (1)	at Rice	No. 23	Reckling Park; Houston, TX	W 10-1	1,157	28-14	15-7
May 1 (2)	at Rice	No. 23	Reckling Park	W 8-1	1,115	29-14	16-7
May 5	Southeastern Louisiana	No. 20	Pete Taylor Park; Hattiesburg, MS	L 3-5		29-15	-
May 7	Middle Tennessee	No. 20	Pete Taylor Park	W 2-1^{10}		30-15	17-7
May 8 (1)	Middle Tennessee	No. 20	Pete Taylor Park	W 6-0		31-15	18-7
May 8 (2)	Middle Tennessee	No. 20	Pete Taylor Park	W 9-0		32-15	19-7
May 9	Middle Tennessee	No. 20	Pete Taylor Park	W 9-5		33-15	20-7
May 14	at Florida Atlantic	No. 19	FAU Baseball Stadium; Boca Raton, FL	L 1-3	286	33-16	20-8
May 15 (1)	at Florida Atlantic	No. 19	FAU Baseball Stadium	W 6-1		34-16	21-8
May 15 (2)	at Florida Atlantic	No. 19	FAU Baseball Stadium	W 14-8	286	35-16	22-8
May 16	at Florida Atlantic	No. 19	FAU Baseball Stadium	L 6-9	286	35-17	22-9

Postseason (5–4)

C-USA Tournament (2–2)
Date	Opponent	Rank (Seed)	Site/stadium	Score	Attendance	Overall record	Tournament record
May 27	vs. (6) Western Kentucky	No. 19 (3)	Pat Patterson Park; Ruston, LA	W 11-1^{8}	1,743	36-17	1-0
May 27	at No. 18 (2) Louisiana Tech	No. 19 (3)	Pat Patterson Park	W 4-1	2,216	37-17	2-0
May 29 (1)	at No. 18 (2) Louisiana Tech	No. 19 (3)	Pat Patterson Park	L 10-11^{10}		37-18	2-1
May 29 (2)	at No. 18 (2) Louisiana Tech	No. 19 (3)	Pat Patterson Park	L 5-6	2,183	37-19	2-2

NCAA Oxford Regional (3–2)
Date	Opponent	Rank (Seed)	Site/stadium	Score	Attendance	Overall record	Tournament record
June 4	vs. (3) Florida State	No. 20 (2)	Swayze Field; Oxford, MS	L 2-5		37-20	0-1
June 5	vs. (4) Southeast Missouri State	No. 19 (3)	Swayze Field	W 21-0	10,225	38-20	1-1
June 6 (1)	vs. (3) Florida State	No. 19 (3)	Swayze Field	W 7-4	10,171	39-20	2-1
June 6 (2)	at No. 13 (1) Ole Miss	No. 19 (3)	Swayze Field	W 10-7	10,628	40-20	3-1
June 7	at No. 13 (1) Ole Miss	No. 19 (3)	Swayze Field	L 9-12	10,293	40-21	3-2

Legend: = Win = Loss = Cancelled/Postponed

Schedule source:

*Rankings are based on the team's current ranking in the D1Baseball poll.

== Rankings ==
Ranking movements Legend: ██ Increase in ranking ██ Decrease in ranking — = Not ranked RV = Received votes
	Week																		
Poll	Pre	1	2	3	4	5	6	7	8	9	10	11	12	13	14	15	16	17	Final
Coaches'	RV	RV*	—	RV	RV	RV	—	RV	RV	RV	22	19	17	17	16	20	20*	20*	23
Baseball America	—	—	—	—	—	—	—	—	—	—	—	22	20	22	23	23	23*	23*	23
Collegiate Baseball^	29	—	—	—	—	—	—	—	—	—	—	—	29	—	—	—	—	—	—
NCBWA†	RV	RV	RV	—	RV	RV	RV	RV	RV	RV	RV	25	20	21	22	22	23	23*	25
D1Baseball	—	—	—	—	—	—	—	—	—	—	23	20	19	19	19	20	20*	20*	23

^ Collegiate Baseball ranked 40 teams in their preseason poll, but only ranked 30 teams weekly during the season.
† NCBWA ranks 30 teams in their preseason poll, but only ranks 25 teams weekly during the season.
* A new poll was not released for this week, so for comparison purposes, the previous week's ranking is inserted in this week's slot.
