= 2021 Louisiana Tech Bulldogs baseball team =

Baseball team season

2021 Louisiana Tech Bulldogs baseball

C-USA West Division champion

Ruston Regional, 2–2
- Conference: Conference USA
- West Division

Ranking
- Coaches: No. 21
- CB: No. 29
- Record: 42–20 (22–8 C-USA)
- Head coach: Lane Burroughs
- Assistant coaches: Mike Silva; Mitch Gaspard; Matt Miller
- Home stadium: J. C. Love Field at Pat Patterson Park

2021 Conference USA baseball standings
	Conf.						Overall
Team	W		L		T	PCT	W		L		T	PCT
East
Charlotte ^{x}‍‍‍^{y}	24	–	8	–	0	.750	40	–	21	–	0	.656
No. 16 Old Dominion ‍‍‡‍^{y}	22	–	10	–	0	.688	44	–	16	–	0	.733
Florida Atlantic ‍‍‍	18	–	14	–	0	.563	32	–	25	–	0	.561
Western Kentucky ‍‍‍	15	–	17	–	0	.469	27	–	29	–	0	.482
FIU ‍‍‍	11	–	19	–	0	.367	20	–	31	–	0	.392
Marshall ‍‍‍	6	–	26	–	0	.188	10	–	35	–	0	.222
West
No. 22 Louisiana Tech ^{x}‍‍‍^{y}	22	–	8	–	0	.733	42	–	20	–	0	.677
No. 23 Southern Miss ‍‍‍^{y}	22	–	9	–	0	.710	40	–	21	–	0	.656
UTSA ‍‍‍	14	–	17	–	0	.452	22	–	26	–	0	.458
Middle Tennessee ‍‍‍	12	–	19	–	1	.391	24	–	29	–	1	.454
Rice ‍‍‍	11	–	20	–	1	.359	23	–	29	–	1	.443
UAB ‍‍‍	11	–	21	–	0	.344	18	–	36	–	0	.333
x – Division champion ‡ – Tournament champion y – Invited to the NCAA tournament As of June 7, 2021; Rankings from D1Baseball

The 2021 Louisiana Tech Bulldogs baseball team represented Louisiana Tech University in the sport of baseball for the 2021 college baseball season. The Bulldogs competed in Division I of the National Collegiate Athletic Association (NCAA) and in Conference USA West Division. They played their home games at J. C. Love Field at Pat Patterson Park, on the university's Ruston campus. The team was coached by Lane Burroughs, who was in his fifth season with the Bulldogs.

== Preseason ==
=== Preseason All-American teams ===
3rd Team

- Parker Bates – Outfielder (Collegiate Baseball)

=== C-USA media poll ===
The Conference USA preseason poll was released on February 11, 2021 with the Bulldogs predicted to finish in second place in the West Division.

Media poll (West)
Predicted finish	Team	1st Place Votes
1	Southern Miss	10
2	Louisiana Tech	2
3	Rice	-
4	Middle Tennessee	-
5	UTSA	-
6	UAB	-

=== Preseason CUSA Player of the Year ===
- Parker Bates – Senior, Outfielder

=== Preseason All-CUSA team ===
- Hunter Wells – Infielder
- Taylor Young – Infielder
- Parker Bates – Outfielder

== Schedule and results ==
2021 Louisiana Tech Bulldogs baseball game log
Regular season (36–16)

February (4–2)
Date	Opponent	Site/stadium	Score	Attendance	Overall record	C-USA record
February 21	vs. Air Force	Alex Box Stadium; Baton Rouge, LA	W 18-1	111	1-0	-
February 22	at No. 11 LSU	Alex Box Stadium	L 7-16	2,059	1-1	-
February 23	at Louisiana	Russo Park; Lafayette, LA	L 0-2	795	1-2	-
February 26	Southern	Pat Patterson Park; Ruston, LA	W 9-2		2-2	-
February 27	Southern	Pat Patterson Park	W 5-1		3-2	-
February 28	Southern	Pat Patterson Park	W 12-4		4-2	-

March (13–4)
Date	Opponent	Rank	Site/stadium	Score	Attendance	Overall record	C-USA record
March 2	at Louisiana		Russo Park; Lafayette, LA	L 2-7	387	4-3	-
March 5	McNeese State		Pat Patterson Park; Ruston, LA	W 11-0	1,000	5-3	-
March 6	McNeesee State		Pat Patterson Park	W 4-3	1,000	6-3	-
March 7	McNeesee State		Pat Patterson Park	W 14-4^{8}	1,000	7-3	-
March 9	at Louisiana–Monroe		Warhawk Field; Monroe, LA	W 10-3	1,100	8-3	-
March 12	No. 1 Arkansas		Pat Patterson Park	L 7-9^{10}	1,000	8-4	-
March 13	No. 1 Arkansas		Pat Patterson Park	L 1-8	1,000	8-5	-
March 14	No. 1 Arkansas		Pat Patterson Park	W 2-0	1,000	9-5	-
March 16	No. 4 Ole Miss		Pat Patterson Park	W 13-1	1,000	10-5	-
March 17	No. 4 Ole Miss		Pat Patterson Park	Canceled			
March 19	at Tulane		Greer Field at Turchin Stadium; New Orleans, LA	W 2-0	668	11-5	-
March 20	at Tulane		Greer Field at Turchin Stadium	W 4-0	771	12-5	-
March 21	at Tulane		Greer Field at Turchin Stadium	W 8-6	696	13-5	-
March 23	Louisiana–Monroe	No. 23	Pat Patterson Park	W 9-7	1,000	14-5	-
March 26	at Southern Miss	No. 23	Pete Taylor Park; Hattiesburg, MS	W 3-2		15-5	1-0
March 27 (1)	at Southern Miss	No. 23	Pete Taylor Park	L 6-14^{7}		15-6	1-1
March 27 (2)	at Southern Miss	No. 23	Pete Taylor Park	W 4-0^{7}		16-6	2-1
March 28	at Southern Miss	No. 23	Pete Taylor Park	W 8-7		17-6	3-1

April (12–5)
Date	Opponent	Rank	Site/stadium	Score	Attendance	Overall record	C-USA record
April 1	UAB	No. 17	Pat Patterson Park; Ruston, LA	W 16-1^{7}	1,000	18-6	4-1
April 2 (1)	UAB	No. 17	Pat Patterson Park	W 6-4^{7}	1,000	19-6	5-1
April 2 (2)	UAB	No. 17	Pat Patterson Park	L 3-9^{7}	1,000	19-7	5-2
April 3	UAB	No. 17	Pat Patterson Park	W 6-0	1,000	20-7	6-2
April 9	at Rice	No. 16	Reckling Park; Houston, TX	W 6-0	1,179	21-7	7-2
April 10 (1)	at Rice	No. 16	Reckling Park	W 7-6^{7}	952	22-7	8-2
April 10 (2)	at Rice	No. 16	Reckling Park	W 20-6^{7}	1,158	23-7	9-2
April 11	at Rice	No. 16	Reckling Park	W 13-4	1,180	24-7	10-2
April 17 (1)	Southern Miss	No. 14	Pat Patterson Park	L 3-4	1,000	24-8	10-3
April 17 (2)	Southern Miss	No. 14	Pat Patterson Park	W 5-3	1,000	25-8	11-3
April 18 (1)	Southern Miss	No. 14	Pat Patterson Park	L 11-12^{7}	1,000	25-9	11-4
April 18 (2)	Southern Miss	No. 14	Pat Patterson Park	W 7-6^{7}	1,000	26-9	12-4
April 23	Marshall	No. 14	Pat Patterson Park	W 4-3	1,000	27-9	13-4
April 24 (1)	Marshall	No. 14	Pat Patterson Park	W 11-4^{7}	1,000	28-9	14-4
April 24 (2)	Marshall	No. 14	Pat Patterson Park	L 5-11^{7}	1,000	28-10	14-5
April 25	Marshall	No. 14	Pat Patterson Park	L 2-7	1,000	28-11	14-6
April 30	at Middle Tennessee	No. 16	Reese Smith Jr. Field; Murfreesboro, TN	W 9-7	200	29-11	15-6

May (7–5)
Date	Opponent	Rank	Site/stadium	Score	Attendance	Overall record	C-USA record
May 1 (1)	at Middle Tennessee	No. 16	Reese Smith Jr. Field; Murfreesboro, TN	W 1-0^{7}	200	30-11	16-6
May 1 (2)	at Middle Tennessee	No. 16	Reese Smith Jr. Field	W 5-4^{7}	200	31-11	17-6
May 2	at Middle Tennessee	No. 16	Reese Smith Jr. Field	W 6-1	200	32-11	18-6
May 8 (1)	at FIU	No. 14	Infinity Insurance Park; Miami, FL	L 5-10	350	32-12	18-7
May 8 (2)	at FIU	No. 14	Infinity Insurance Park	W 12-7	325	33-12	19-7
May 9 (1)	at FIU	No. 14	Infinity Insurance Park	Canceled			
May 9 (2)	at FIU	No. 14	Infinity Insurance Park	Canceled			
May 11	at LSU	No. 14	Alex Box Stadium; Baton Rouge, LA	L 8-16^{7}	4,068	33-13	-
May 14	UTSA	No. 14	Pat Patterson Park; Ruston, LA	L 5-7	1,548	33-14	19-8
May 15 (1)	UTSA	No. 14	Pat Patterson Park	W 4-1^{7}	1,545	34-14	20-8
May 15 (2)	UTSA	No. 14	Pat Patterson Park	W 10-7^{8}	1,545	35-14	21-8
May 16	UTSA	No. 14	Pat Patterson Park	W 17-7^{7}	1,609	36-14	22-8
May 20	Old Dominion	No. 14	Pat Patterson Park	L 8-10	1,538	36-15	-
May 21	Old Dominion	No. 14	Pat Patterson Park	L 7-8	1,673	36-16	-

Postseason (6–4)

C-USA Tournament (4–2)
Date	Opponent	Rank (Seed)	Site/stadium	Score	Attendance	Overall record	Tournament record
May 26	(7) UTSA	No. 18 (2)	Pat Patterson Park; Ruston, LA	W 7-6^{12}		37-16	1-0
May 27	No. 19 (3) Southern Miss	No. 18 (2)	Pat Patterson Park	L 1-4	2,216	37-17	1-1
May 28	(6) Western Kentucky	No. 18 (2)	Pat Patterson Park	W 14-4^{8}	1,539	38-17	2-1
May 29 (1)	No. 19 (3) Southern Miss	No. 18 (2)	Pat Patterson Park	W 11-10^{10}		39-17	3-1
May 29 (2)	No. 19 (3) Southern Miss	No. 18 (2)	Pat Patterson Park	W 6-5	2,183	40-17	4-1
May 30	No. 24 (4) Old Dominion	No. 18 (2)	Pat Patterson Park	L 5-7^{10}	2,484	40-18	4-2

NCAA Ruston Regional (2–2)
Date	Opponent	Rank (Seed)	Site/stadium	Score	Attendance	Overall record	Tournament record
June 4	(4) Rider	No. 18 (1)	Pat Patterson Park; Ruston, LA	W 18-2	2,634	41-18	1-0
June 5	No. 16 (2) NC State	No. 18 (1)	Pat Patterson Park	L 3-8	2,817	41-19	1-1
June 6 (1)	(3) Alabama	No. 18 (1)	Pat Patterson Park	W 10-8	2,582	42-19	2-1
June 6 (2)	No. 16 (2) NC State	No. 18 (1)	Pat Patterson Park	L 7-14	2,513	42-20	2-2

Legend: = Win = Loss = Cancelled

Schedule source:

*Rankings are based on the team's current ranking in the D1Baseball poll.

== Rankings ==
Ranking movements Legend: ██ Increase in ranking ██ Decrease in ranking — = Not ranked RV = Received votes
	Week																		
Poll	Pre	1	2	3	4	5	6	7	8	9	10	11	12	13	14	15	16	17	Final
Coaches'	—	—*	—	—	RV	RV	19	19	15	15	18	14	16	14	20	18	18*	18*	21
Baseball America	—	—	—	—	—	—	23	22	16	19	18	18	18	15	22	20	20*	20*	22
Collegiate Baseball^	RV	—	—	—	—	—	—	—	22	—	—	19	20	20	27	25	29	29	29
NCBWA†	—	—	RV	RV	RV	26	20	20	13	15	18	14	15	15	21	17	21	21*	22
D1Baseball	—	—	—	—	—	23	17	16	14	14	16	14	14	14	18	18	18*	18*	22

^ Collegiate Baseball ranked 40 teams in their preseason poll, but only ranked 30 teams weekly during the season.
† NCBWA ranks 30 teams in their preseason poll, but only ranks 25 teams weekly during the season.
* A new poll was not released for this week, so for comparison purposes, the previous week's ranking is inserted in this week's slot.
