= 2021 Conference USA baseball tournament =

- Teams: 8
- Format: See below
- Finals site: J. C. Love Field at Pat Patterson Park; Ruston, Louisiana
- Champions: Old Dominion (1st title)
- Winning coach: Chris Finwood (1st title)
- MVP: Tommy Bell (Old Dominion)
- Television: ESPN+ (first round–semifinals); CBSSN (Championship game)

2021 Conference USA baseball standings
	Conf.						Overall
Team	W		L		T	PCT	W		L		T	PCT
East
Charlotte ^{x}‍‍‍^{y}	24	–	8	–	0	.750	40	–	21	–	0	.656
No. 16 Old Dominion ‍‍‡‍^{y}	22	–	10	–	0	.688	44	–	16	–	0	.733
Florida Atlantic ‍‍‍	18	–	14	–	0	.563	32	–	25	–	0	.561
Western Kentucky ‍‍‍	15	–	17	–	0	.469	27	–	29	–	0	.482
FIU ‍‍‍	11	–	19	–	0	.367	20	–	31	–	0	.392
Marshall ‍‍‍	6	–	26	–	0	.188	10	–	35	–	0	.222
West
No. 22 Louisiana Tech ^{x}‍‍‍^{y}	22	–	8	–	0	.733	42	–	20	–	0	.677
No. 23 Southern Miss ‍‍‍^{y}	22	–	9	–	0	.710	40	–	21	–	0	.656
UTSA ‍‍‍	14	–	17	–	0	.452	22	–	26	–	0	.458
Middle Tennessee ‍‍‍	12	–	19	–	1	.391	24	–	29	–	1	.454
Rice ‍‍‍	11	–	20	–	1	.359	23	–	29	–	1	.443
UAB ‍‍‍	11	–	21	–	0	.344	18	–	36	–	0	.333
x – Division champion ‡ – Tournament champion y – Invited to the NCAA tournament As of June 7, 2021; Rankings from D1Baseball

The 2021 Conference USA baseball tournament was held from May 26 through 30 at J. C. Love Field at Pat Patterson Park in Ruston, Louisiana. The annual tournament determines the tournament champion of Division I Conference USA in college baseball. The tournament champion will then earn the conference's automatic bid to the 2021 NCAA Division I baseball tournament.

The tournament has been held every year since 1996, except for 2020, due to the COVID-19 pandemic. The Rice Owls has claimed seven championships, the most of any school, with the Owls latest win in 2017. This was the tournaments first appearance at J. C. Love Field.

== Format and seeding ==
The tournament will consist the top eight teams in regular season play. The top three teams in each division will receive automatic bid, plus two teams with the best winning percentage regardless of division will receive at-large bids. The format will consist of two double-elimination brackets, with a single-elimination championship game.

Team	W–L	Pct	Seed
East Division
xy – Charlotte	24–8	0.750	1
x – Old Dominion	22–10	0.688	4
x – Florida Atlantic	18–14	0.563	5
x – Western Kentucky	15–17	0.469	6
FIU	11–19	0.367	X
Marshall	6–26	0.188	X

Team	W–L	Pct	Seed
West Division
xy – Louisiana Tech	22–8	0.733	2
x – Southern Miss	22–9	0.710	3
x – UTSA	14–17	0.452	7
x – Middle Tennessee	12–19–1	0.391	8
Rice	11–20–1	0.359	
UAB	11–21	0.344	

As of May 16, 2021
x – Clinched C-USA tournament berth
y – Clinched division title

- For the first time since joining Conference USA in 2005, Rice did not qualify for this season's conference tournament. The Owls break their 14-year streak. Southern Miss currently holds the most appearances at 25. The Golden Eagles have appeared in every tournament since the creation of the tournament in 1996.

== Bracket and results ==
First round
4	Old Dominion	11
5	Florida Atlantic	2
1	Charlotte	2
8	Middle Tennessee	7
5	Florida Atlantic	9
1	Charlotte	8
2	Louisiana Tech	7^{12}
7	UTSA	6
3	Southern Miss	11^{8}
6	Western Kentucky	1
7	UTSA	9^{10}
6	Western Kentucky	10

Second round
4	Old Dominion	10
8	Middle Tennessee	6
8	Middle Tennessee	8
5	Florida Atlantic	14
2	Louisiana Tech	1
3	Southern Miss	4
2	Louisiana Tech	14
6	Western Kentucky	4

Semifinals
4	Old Dominion	13	-
5	Florida Atlantic	5	-
3	Southern Miss	10	5
2	Louisiana Tech	11^{10}	6

Championship
4	Old Dominion	7^{10}
2	Louisiana Tech	5

== Schedule ==
Game	Time*	Matchup^{#}	Score	Television
Wednesday, May 26
1	11:00 a.m. (Note: The first game of the tournament was set to start at 9:00 a.m., but was delayed due to weather.)	No. 4 Old Dominion vs. No. 5 Florida Atlantic	–	ESPN+
2	2:30 p.m.	No. 1 Charlotte vs. No. 8 Middle Tennessee	–	ESPN+
3	6:30 p.m.	No. 2 Louisiana Tech vs. No. 7 UTSA	–	ESPN+
Thursday, May 27
4	12:15 a.m.	No. 3 Southern Miss vs. No. 6 Western Kentucky	–	ESPN+
5	9:00 a.m.	No. 5 Florida Atlantic vs. No. 1 Charlotte	–	ESPN+
6	1:15 p.m.	No. 4 Old Dominion vs. No. 8 Middle Tennessee	–	ESPN+
7	5:00 p.m.	No. 7 UTSA vs. No. 6 Western Kentucky	–	ESPN+
8	9:50 p.m.	No. 2 Louisiana Tech vs. No. 3 Southern Miss	–	ESPN+
Friday, May 28
9	3:00 p.m.	No. 5 Florida Atlantic vs. No. 8 Middle Tennessee	–	ESPN+
10	6:30 p.m.	No. 6 Western Kentucky vs. No. 2 Louisiana Tech	–	ESPN+
Saturday, May 29
11	9:00 a.m.	No. 4 Old Dominion vs. No. 5 Florida Atlantic	–	ESPN+
12	12:30 p.m.	No. 3 Southern Miss vs. No. 2 Louisiana Tech	–	ESPN+
13	4:00 p.m.	If necessary	–	ESPN+
14	7:30 p.m.	No. 3 Southern Miss vs. No. 2 Louisiana Tech	–	ESPN+
Championship – Sunday, May 30
15	1:00 p.m.	No. 4 Old Dominion vs. No. 2 Louisiana Tech	–	CBS Sports Network
*Game times in CDT. # – Rankings denote tournament seed.

== Conference championship ==
Conference USA Championship
(4) Old Dominion Monarchs	vs.	(2) Louisiana Tech Bulldogs

May 30, 2021, 1:06 p.m. (CDT) at Pat Patterson Park in Ruston, Louisiana
Team	1	2	3	4	5	6	7	8	9	10	R	H	E
(4) Old Dominion	0	0	0	0	1	3	0	1	0	2	7	12	0
(2) Louisiana Tech	0	0	2	0	1	0	0	1	1	0	5	10	2
WP: Aaron Holiday (4–1) LP: Jonathan Fincher (7–3); Home runs: ODU: Kyle Battle (1); Tommy Bell (1); Robbie Petracci (1); LaTech: Parker Bates (1); Attendance: 2,484

== All–Tournament Team ==
Position	Player	Team
C	Brock Gagliardi	Old Dominion
IF	Hunter Wells	Louisiana Tech
IF	Manny Garcia	Louisiana Tech
IF	Tommy Bell (MVP)	Old Dominion
IF	Christopher Sargent	Southern Miss
OF	Bobby Morgensen	Florida Atlantic
OF	Parker Bates	Louisiana Tech
OF	Andy Garriola	Old Dominion
UT	Steele Netterville	Louisiana Tech
P	Greg Martinez	Louisiana Tech
P	Aaron Brown	Middle Tennessee
P	Hunter Gregory	Old Dominion
P	Hunter Stanley	Southern Miss

== Tournament site ==
In June 2020, Louisiana Tech University won the bid to host the tournament on their campus for the first time since joining the conference. This will also be the first campus site for the tournament since 2016, as since then the games were played at MGM Park in Biloxi, Mississippi. The tournament returns to the state of Louisiana for the first time since the 2008 tournament, where it was played in New Orleans.

Pat Patterson Park, is a newly reconstructed stadium that opened for the 2021 season. The former stadium, along with other sports facilities was destroyed in 2019 by a F3 tornado.
