= Marc Rardin =

American baseball player and coach

Current position
- Title: Head coach
- Team: Western Kentucky
- Conference: Conference USA
- Record: 145-89

Biographical details
- Born: 1971 or 1972 (age 53–54); Iowa, U.S.

Playing career
- 1992–1993: Indian Hills CC
- 1994–1995: Iowa Wesleyan

Coaching career (HC unless noted)
- 1996–1997: Bluefield (P)
- 1998–1999: Baylor (P)
- 2000–2002: Yavapai College (P)
- 2003: Lamar CC (P)
- 2004–2022: Iowa Western CC
- 2023–present: Western Kentucky

Head coaching record
- Overall: 145–89 (NCAA); 934–252 (NJCAA)
- Tournaments: NCAA: 0–2; 122–43 (NJCAA)

Accomplishments and honors

Championships
- 3× NJCAA National Champion (2010, 2012, 2014); 15x Region XI Regular Season (2005-2019,2022); 12X North District (2005, 2007,12, 14-16, 18-19); C-USA tournament (2025)

Awards
- C-USA Coach of the Year: (2025); 3x National COY; 10x Northern District COY; 12x Louisville Slugger COY

Marc Rardin is an American baseball coach and former player, who is the current head baseball coach of the Western Kentucky Hilltoppers. He played college baseball at Indian Hills Community College before transferring to Iowa Wesleyan University. He then served as the head coach of the Iowa Western Reivers (2004–2022)

== Playing career ==
Rardin attended Starmont High School in Arlington, Iowa and played college baseball at Indian Hills Community College before transferring to Iowa Wesleyan University.

== Coaching career ==
Rardin began his coaching career as the pitching coach at Bluefield College. In 1998, he became an volunteer pitching coach at Baylor. Following a 2-year stint as an assistant with the Bears, he took the pitching coach position with the Yavapai Roughriders. After a brief stint with Lamar Community College, Rardin was named the head coach at Iowa Western Community College. While at Iowa Western, Rardin would lead the Reivers to 3 National Junior College Athletic Association (NJCAA) national championships.

On June 15, 2022, Rardin was named the head coach of the Western Kentucky Hilltoppers.

== Head coaching record ==
Record table
Season	Team	Overall	Conference	Standing	Postseason
Iowa Western CC Reivers (ICCAC) (2003–2022)
2003	Iowa Western CC	37–15			Regional XI Conference
2004	Iowa Western CC	43–10			
2005	Iowa Western CC	43–13			Junior College World Series (3rd)
2006	Iowa Western CC	37–13			Region IX Conference
2007	Iowa Western CC	42–18			Junior College World Series (10th)
2008	Iowa Western CC	52–12			Junior College World Series (6th)
2010	Iowa Western CC	39–24			Junior College World Series (9th)
2010	Iowa Western CC	51–12			Junior College World Series
2011	Iowa Western CC	43–20			Junior College World Series (3rd)
2012	Iowa Western CC	62–6			Junior College World Series
2013	Iowa Western CC	45–13			Region XI Conference
2014	Iowa Western CC	56–11			Junior College World Series
2015	Iowa Western CC	54–17			Junior College World Series (5th)
2016	Iowa Western CC	52–15			Junior College World Series (4th)
2017	Iowa Western CC	44–16			Region XI Regular Season
2018	Iowa Western CC	54–7			Region XI Regular Season
2019	Iowa Western CC	52–11			Junior College World Series Runner-Up
2020	Iowa Western CC	20–4			
2021	Iowa Western CC	50–10			Region XI Regular Season
2022	Iowa Western CC	49–14			Region XI Regular Season
Iowa Western CC (NJCAA):		934–252	452–69		
Western Kentucky Hilltoppers (Conference USA) (2023–present)
2023	Western Kentucky	33–26	16–14	T-4th	C-USA Tournament
2024	Western Kentucky	36–22	15–9	3rd	C-USA Tournament
2025	Western Kentucky	46–14	18–9	2nd	NCAA Regional
2026	Western Kentucky	30-26	14-16	6th	C-USA Tournament
Western Kentucky:		145–89	63–48		
Total:		1,079–341			
National champion Postseason invitational champion Conference regular season champion Conference regular season and conference tournament champion Division regular season champion Division regular season and conference tournament champion Conference tournament champion
