= Jeff Waggoner =

American baseball coach and catcher

Biographical details
- Education: Cleveland State '98

Playing career
- 1995–1996: Crowder
- 1997–1998: Cleveland State
- Position: C

Coaching career (HC unless noted)
- 2000: Saint Rose (asst.)
- 2001–2002: George Washington (asst.)
- 2003–2004: Kent State (asst.)
- 2005–2006: NC State (asst.)
- 2007–2022: Marshall

Head coaching record
- Overall: 348–477–3 (.422)
- Tournaments: C-USA: 8–10; NCAA: 0–0

Jeff Waggoner is an American baseball coach and former catcher, who is the former head baseball coach of the Marshall Thundering Herd. He played college baseball at Crowder College from 1995 to 1996 before transferring to Cleveland State from 1997 to 1998.

== Playing career ==
Waggoner played catcher for two years at Crowder College, a junior college in Missouri, before completing his career at Cleveland State.

== Coaching career ==
After completing his playing career, Waggoner began coaching at Saint Rose in Albany, New York. In his one season with the Golden Knights, they reached the Division II College World Series. He then landed an assistant coaching position with George Washington. The Colonials set a school record for wins (42), won the Atlantic 10 Conference championship, and were among the national leaders in many offensive categories in 2002. Waggoner then moved to Kent State for two seasons. The Golden Flashes claimed the 2004 Mid-American Conference baseball tournament and saw seven players picked in the Major League Baseball draft. He moved to NC State next, where he served as recruiting coordinator, as well as managing player development, academic support and travel, preparing him well for his future head coaching duties. The Wolfpack appeared in the NCAA Tournament during both seasons, finished second in the 2006 Atlantic Coast Conference baseball tournament, and produced two All-Americans.

In the summer of 2006, Waggoner was named head coach at Marshall of Conference USA. During his time at Marshall, 24 players have signed professional contracts, and the Thundering Herd set a program record for wins with 30 in 2008. The 2008 season also saw him named Coach of the Year by Collegiate Baseball Newspaper. On October 13, 2022 Waggoner was fired as head coach at Marshall.

== Head coaching record ==
Below is a table of Waggoner's yearly records as an NCAA head baseball coach.

Record table
Season	Team	Overall	Conference	Standing	Postseason
Marshall Thundering Herd (Conference USA) (2007–2022)
2007	Marshall	21–32	5–18	9th	
2008	Marshall	30–30–1	10–12–1	6th	C-USA Tournament
2009	Marshall	22–32	9–15	T–7th	C-USA Tournament
2010	Marshall	27–31	12–12	T–3rd	C-USA Tournament
2011	Marshall	20–31	7–17	9th	
2012	Marshall	17–36	5–19	9th	
2013	Marshall	20–34	6–18	9th	
2014	Marshall	20–31	10–19	T–11th	
2015	Marshall	20–32	12–18	9th	
2016	Marshall	34–21	21–9	2nd	C-USA Tournament
2017	Marshall	25–28	12–17	9th	
2018	Marshall	19–32	7–23	11th	
2019	Marshall	29–28	14–15	6th	C-USA Tournament
2020	Marshall	4–10–1	0–0		Season canceled due to COVID-19
2021	Marshall	10–35	6–26	6th (East)	
2022	Marshall	20–34–1	9–21	T–9th	
Marshall:		348–477–3 (.422)	145–259–1 (.359)		
Total:		348–477–3 (.422)			
National champion Postseason invitational champion Conference regular season champion Conference regular season and conference tournament champion Division regular season champion Division regular season and conference tournament champion Conference tournament champion
