= Robert Woodard (baseball) =

American baseball player and coach (born 1985)

Current position
- Title: Head coach
- Team: Charlotte
- Conference: The American
- Record: 209–163 (.562)

Biographical details
- Born: January 10, 1985 (age 41); Winston-Salem, North Carolina, U.S.

Playing career
- 2004–2007: North Carolina
- 2007: Eugene Emeralds
- 2007–2008: Portland Beavers
- 2008: Fort Wayne Wizards
- 2008–2009: Lake Elsinore Storm
- Position: Pitcher

Coaching career (HC unless noted)
- 2010–2012: North Carolina (asst)
- 2013: UNC Wilmington (asst)
- 2014–2016: Virginia Tech (asst)
- 2017–2019: North Carolina (asst)
- 2020–present: Charlotte

Head coaching record
- Overall: 209–163 (.562)
- Tournaments: C-USA: 5–5; AAC: 2–5; NCAA: 3–4

Accomplishments and honors

Championships
- C-USA Conference Tournament (2023); C-USA East Division (2021)

Awards
- C-USA Coach of the Year (2021)

Robert Suiter Woodard (born January 10, 1985) is an American baseball coach and former pitcher. He is the head baseball coach at the University of North Carolina at Charlotte. Woodard played college baseball at the University of North Carolina at Chapel Hill from 2004 to 2007 for coach Mike Fox and in Minor League Baseball (MiLB) for three seasons from 2007 to 2009.

== Amateur career ==
Woodard was born in Winston-Salem, North Carolina and attended Myers Park High School in Charlotte, North Carolina, where he played for the school's baseball teams and pitched and played shortstop. As a senior, the Team One South Showcase named Woodard a top 10 prospect. He also played on the Area Code National Team in the Japan Goodwill Series.

After graduation from high school, he decided to attend University of North Carolina at Chapel Hill to play baseball. After his junior season, he was selected by the St. Louis Cardinals in the 2006 Major League Baseball draft's 46th round. He returned to North Carolina for his senior season where he was drafted in the twentieth round of the 2007 Major League Baseball draft by the San Diego Padres.

The all-time winningest pitcher in program history at UNC, Woodard posted a career record of 34–5 over four seasons as a Tar Heel. He was a three-time All-ACC performer and the 2006-07 recipient of the Patterson Medal, North Carolina's highest athletic honor. From 2004 to 2007, the Tar Heels won 195 games and advanced to back-to-back College World Series Finals in 2006 and 2007. In addition to the aforementioned career record of 34–5, Woodard finished his college career with a perfect 22–0 record at UNC's Boshamer Stadium. He also left North Carolina ranking among the top 10 in Atlantic Coast Conference history in victories and innings pitched.

== Coaching career ==
In 2012, Woodard served as pitching coach of the Orleans Firebirds, a collegiate summer baseball team in the Cape Cod Baseball League.

In 2019, Woodard was named the head coach of the Charlotte 49ers baseball program.

== Head coaching record ==
Record table
Season	Team	Overall	Conference	Standing	Postseason
Charlotte 49ers (Conference USA) (2020–2023)
2020	Charlotte	9–8	N/A	N/A	Season canceled due to COVID-19
2021	Charlotte	40–21	24–8	1st (East)	NCAA Regionals
2022	Charlotte	36–22	17–13	T–6th	
2023	Charlotte	36–28	17–12	3rd	NCAA Regionals
Charlotte:		– (–)	58–33 (.637)		
Charlotte 49ers (American Athletic Conference) (2024–present)
2024	Charlotte	24–34	12–15	T–6th	AAC Tournament
2025	Charlotte	36–22	18–9	2nd	AAC Tournament
2026	Charlotte	28–28	12–15	8th	AAC Tournament
Charlotte:		209–163 (.562)	42–39 (.519)		
Total:		209–163 (.562)			
National champion Postseason invitational champion Conference regular season champion Conference regular season and conference tournament champion Division regular season champion Division regular season and conference tournament champion Conference tournament champion

== See also ==
- List of current NCAA Division I baseball coaches
