= Kennedy Center Field =

Baseball stadium in Huntington, West Virginia

- Interactive map of Kennedy Center Field
- Location: 5800 Ohio River Road; Huntington, West Virginia
- Coordinates: 38°27′5.5″N 82°18′52.4″W
- Owner: YMCA
- Operator: YMCA
- Capacity: 525
- Surface: AstroTurf
- Field size: Left Field: 310 ft Center Field: 390 ft Right Field: 310 ft

Tenant
- Marshall Thundering Herd (NCAA) (2014–2023)

Kennedy Center Field is a community baseball field at the Kennedy Center YMCA recreation camp on West Virginia Route 2 about 4 miles (6.4 km) north of Huntington, West Virginia.

== History ==
In 2014 field was used by the Marshall University baseball team, in the 2023 season their new stadium located in downtown Huntington, West Virginia, Jack Cook Field, opened.

== See also ==
- List of NCAA Division I baseball venues
