= FIU Baseball Stadium =

Baseball stadium at Florida International University

- Interactive map of FIU Baseball Stadium
- Former names: University Park Stadium, Infinity Insurance Park
- Location: Westchester; 11200 S.W. 8th Street; Miami, Florida 33199
- Coordinates: 25.7545°N 80.3808°W
- Owner: Florida International University
- Operator: Florida International University
- Capacity: 2,000
- Surface: Grass
- Record attendance: 2,473 (Miami (FL), February 26th, 2002
- Field size: Left Field: 325 ft (99 m); Left-Center Field: 375 ft (114 m); Center Field: 400 ft (120 m); Right-Center Field: 375 ft (114 m); Right Field: 325 ft (99 m)

Construction
- Groundbreaking: 1995
- Opened: January 26, 1996
- Renovated: 2001, 2003, 2007
- Cost: $3.5 million

Tenant
- FIU Panthers (NCAA) (1996–Present)

Website
- FIU Baseball Stadium

FIU Baseball Stadium, formerly known as University Park Stadium and Infinity Insurance Park, is a baseball stadium located on the campus of Florida International University in Westchester, Florida, United States. It is the home venue of the FIU Panthers college baseball team of the Division I Conference USA. The facility opened on January 26, 1996, with a 1–0 FIU victory against Bethune-Cookman and was built on the same site as its predecessor, which had stood since 1965 (albeit with a slightly differently angled field configuration).

FIU Baseball Stadium has a seating capacity of 2,000 people. The largest crowd in the stadium's history was 2,473 on February 26, 2002, when FIU defeated their cross-town rivals the Miami Hurricanes 7–1.

The team spent the 2005 season at the Homestead Sports Complex in Homestead while FIU Baseball Stadium underwent an expansion. In 2005, the facility hosted the Sun Belt Conference Baseball Tournament.

In 2018 Infinity Insurance acquired the naming rights for the stadium, but did not renew those rights the following year, reverting the name back to FIU Baseball Stadium.

== See also ==
- List of NCAA Division I baseball venues
- FIU Stadium (FIU Football)
- FIU Arena (FIU Basketball)
