= Jerry D. Young Memorial Field =

College baseball stadium in Birmingham, Alabama

Coordinates: 33.49824°N 86.810115°W

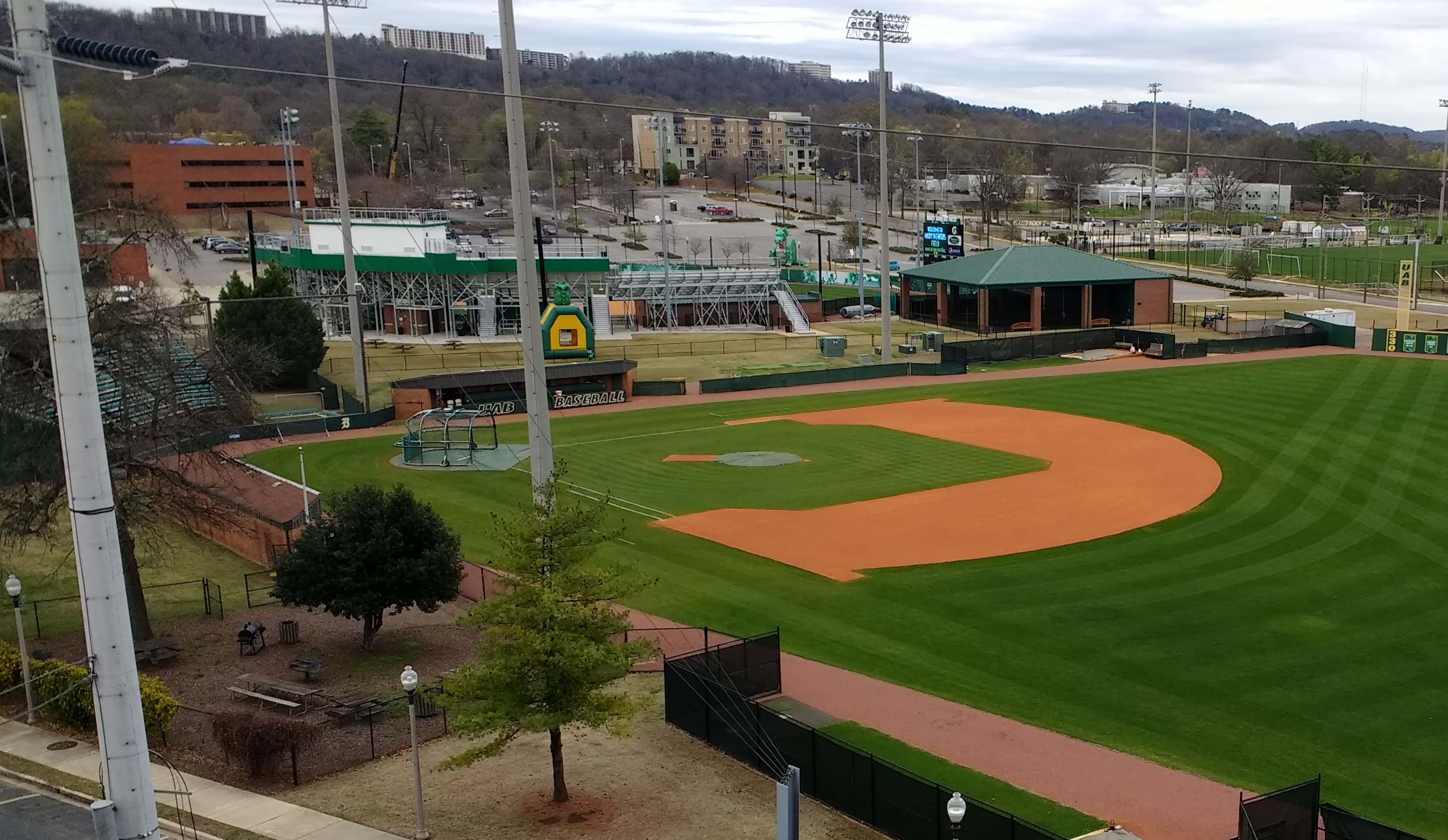
- Interactive map of Jerry D. Young Memorial Field
- Location: University Boulevard; Birmingham, Alabama 35294
- Owner: University of Alabama at Birmingham
- Operator: University of Alabama at Birmingham
- Capacity: 1,000
- Surface: Artificial turf (installed for 2022 season)
- Field size: Left Field - 330 ft Left Center - 370 ft Center Field - 400 ft Right Center - 360 ft Right Field - 330 ft Outfield Wall Height - 8 ft Batter's Eye Dimensions (out of play) - 30 ft x 100 ft

Construction
- Opened: February 26, 1984

Tenants
- UAB Blazers baseball (NCAA Division I The American (1984–2023), American Athletic Conference (joined for 2024 season)

Jerry D. Young Memorial Field, located in Birmingham, Alabama is the home field for the UAB Blazers baseball team. The stadium opened in 1984, and is named in honor of former UAB administrator Jerry D. Young, who was responsible for the establishment and early development of the program. It currently has a seating capacity of 1,000.

The baseball field is oriented with home plate in the southeast. The outfield fence is 330 feet deep in left and right field and 400 feet deep to center. The fence is 8 feet tall. Any ball hit above the 8-foot line and striking the scoreboard, "batter's eye" wall, or foul pole above that height is considered a ground rule home run.

== History ==
The facility opened on February 26, 1984, with the Blazers defeating the Vanderbilt Commodores 14–8. Approximately one year later, the stadium was renamed in honor of Jerry D. Young on April 18, 1985. By 1992 the facility served as the site for the first Great Midwest Conference Baseball Championship, in which the Blazers would be victorious. Through the 2007 season, UAB has an all-time record of 426-279-1 at Young Memorial Field.

== See also ==
- List of NCAA Division I baseball venues
