= Roadrunner Field =

Baseball stadium in San Antonio, Texas, US

- The Bird Bath
- Interactive map of Roadrunner Field
- Coordinates: 29.5829°N 98.6260°W
- Owner: University of Texas at San Antonio
- Operator: University of Texas at San Antonio
- Capacity: 1000
- Surface: Natural grass
- Field size: Left field: 335 ft (102 m); Center field: 405 ft (123 m); Right field: 340 ft (100 m)

Construction
- Built: 1992
- Opened: 1993
- Renovated: 2006, 2027

Tenant
- UTSA Roadrunners baseball (NCAA) (1993–Present)

Roadrunner Field is a college baseball stadium in San Antonio, Texas, United States on the main campus of the University of Texas at San Antonio. It is home to the UTSA Roadrunners baseball team, and seats 1000. The stadium was opened in 1993. The stadium features a press box with seating for eight, and three indoor batting cages. In 2006, the stadium was renovated, and outfitted with lights that allowed games to be played at night. In 2026, a video scoreboard was installed in center field midseason.

On May 19th, 2026, it was announced Roadrunner Field would receive additional renovations to seating areas, concessions, and restroom facilities, alongside additional facilities for coaches and players. It is slated to break ground in early 2027.

== See also ==
- List of NCAA Division I baseball venues
