= J. C. Love Field at Pat Patterson Park =

Baseball stadium in Ruston, Louisiana

J.C. Love Field at Pat Patterson Park
- "Love Shack"
- The ballpark in 2026
- Interactive map of J.C. Love Field at Pat Patterson Park
- Former names: Tech Stadium (1971–1982); J. C. Love Field (1982–2008)
- Location: Ruston, Louisiana
- Coordinates: 32°31′49.80″N 92°39′05.47″W
- Owner: Louisiana Tech University
- Operator: Louisiana Tech University
- Capacity: 2,100
- Surface: Field Turf
- Record attendance: 3,311 (2017 vs. Louisiana Ragin' Cajuns baseball)
- Field size: Left Field – 315 ft Left-Center Alley – 370 ft Center Field – 380 ft Right-Center Alley – 350 ft Right Field – 325 ft

Construction
- Opened: 1971 Reopened 2021
- Renovated: 2016

Tenant
- Louisiana Tech Bulldogs baseball (1971–present)

J.C. Love Field at Pat Patterson Park is a baseball stadium in Ruston, Louisiana, United States. It is the home field of the Louisiana Tech University Bulldogs college baseball team.

== History ==
The facility features a seating capacity of 2,100 much of which is chairback seating. Prior to the 2016 season, artificial field turf was installed to replace the natural grass playing surface. The ballpark also boasts large picnic and viewing areas beyond the outfield wall that are very popular with Tech fans and the "Right Field Rowdies" cheering section. In 1997, a then school-record of 3,251 fans attended the Bulldogs' game against eventual national champion LSU.

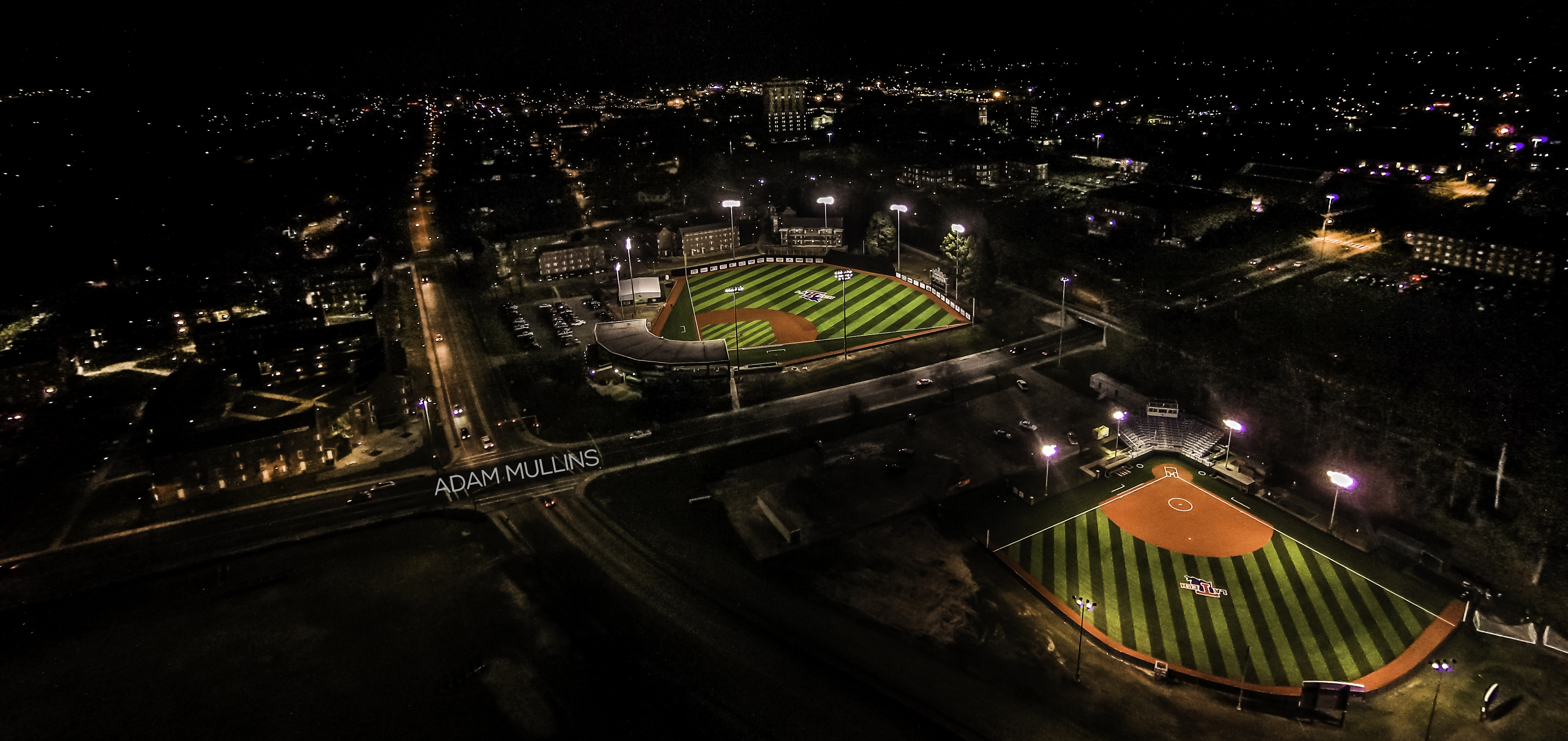
J. C. Love Field at Pat Patterson Park and Dr. Billy Bundrick Field at night

On May 22, 2008, the facility was rededicated as J.C. Love Field at Pat Patterson Park in honor of Tech legend Pat Patterson.

The stadium was the sight of one of the greatest comebacks in college baseball history during the 2006 season. Down 12–6 with two outs in the bottom of the 9th to #3 Mississippi State, Tech scored seven runs on eight singles and one walk to win the game 13–12.

On March 15, 2017, a new attendance record was set in a game against the Louisiana Ragin' Cajuns, at 3,311.

== Rebuild ==
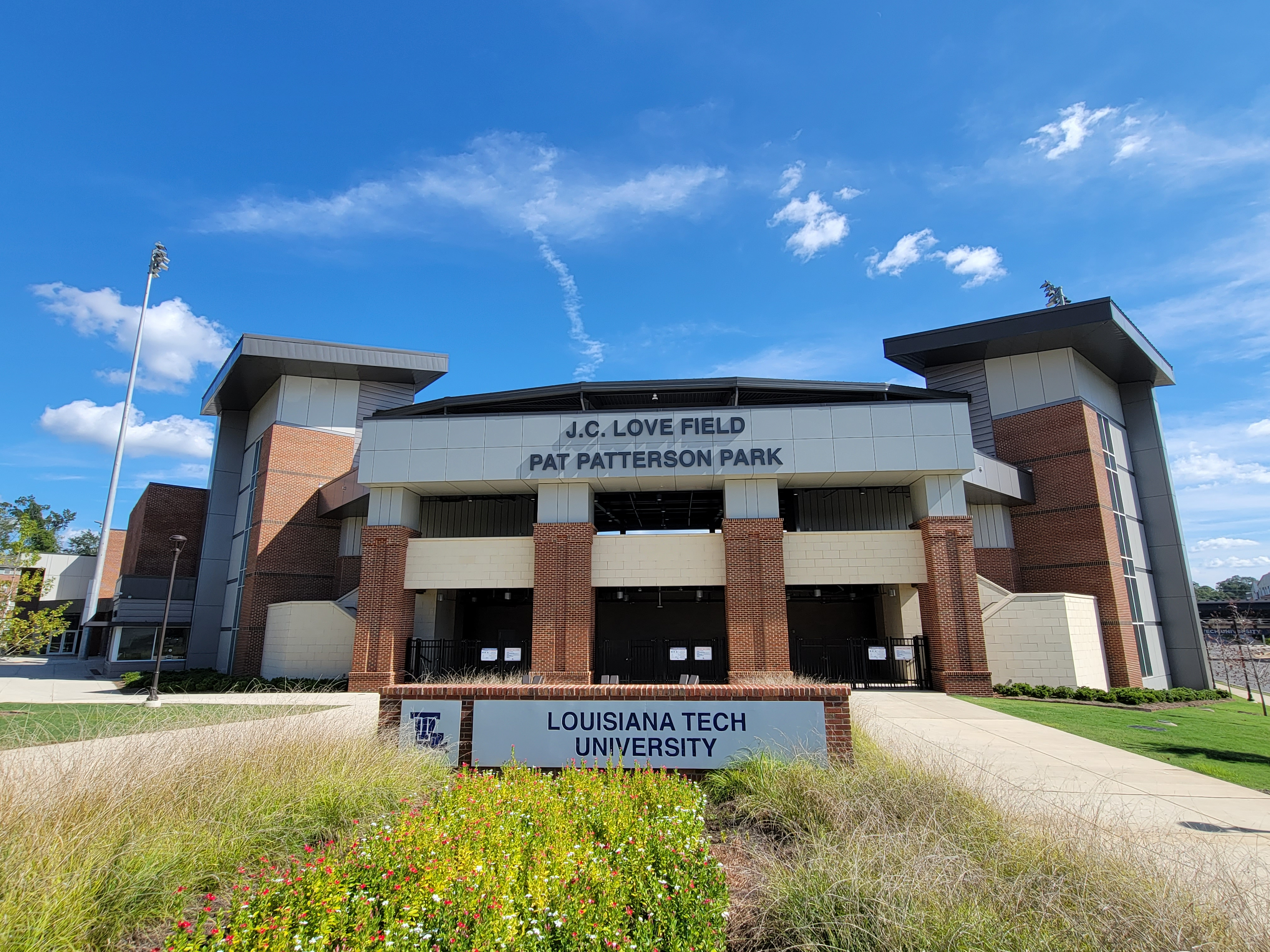
J. C. Love Field at Pat Patterson Park - Main Entrance

During the early morning hours of April 25, 2019, an EF-3 tornado destroyed the facility, deeming it unplayable for the remainder of the season. The 2020 season was played at Ruston High's baseball field before its cancellation in mid-March due to the COVID-19 pandemic.

The stadium was demolished during the spring of 2020 and construction began on a new stadium in the summer of 2020.

The first game at the new J.C. Love Field at Pat Patterson Park was Friday, February 26, 2021. Tech beat Southern University 9–2. Fans were not allowed inside the stadium due to ongoing construction, but hundreds watched from beyond the left field wall.

Total capacity of the facility is 2,100. There is a fixed seating capacity of 1,322 permanent chair back seats, as well as a first base turf berm area for fans to bring chairs. Extending down the right field line is an area for tailgate tents and there is also a grass berm beyond the right field fence that is the home of the Kennel, the student section.

The stadium walls are all padded in Tech blue. The outfield wall varies in height with it being 12’ in left field and dropping to 8’ in right center (315’ left, 380’ center, 325’ right).

The pressbox level features four suites, a radio booth for both home and visiting teams, scoreboard productions, TV production and a booth for the writing press.

The scoreboard is a Daktronics scoreboard featuring both a video screen and a fixed digit scoreboard. There is an additional auxiliary scoreboard in the stands so the fans in the outfield can see the game updates.

=== Notable Games ===
In the new re-built J.C. Love Field at Pat Patterson Park, the Bulldogs have tallied wins over the #1 ranked Arkansas Razorbacks and the #4 ranked Ole Miss Rebels.

Louisiana Tech hosted an NCAA Division I regional for the first time June 4–6, 2021. North Carolina State won the regional championship, defeating Alabama once and Tech twice.

== Tournaments Hosted ==
Conference Tournaments: 2021, 2024 (CUSA)
NCAA Regional Tournaments: 2021

== Attendance Records ==
Top 10 Largest Crowds at J.C. Love Field at Pat Patterson Park

Rank	Attendance	Opponent	Year	Winner, Score
1.	3,311	UL-Lafayette	2017	Tech, 6-5 (13)
2.	3,251	LSU	1997	LSU, 13-1
3.	3,154	Arkansas	2007	Arkansas, 4-2
4.	3,125	LSU	1991	LSU, 13-6
5.	3,076	Arkansas	2007	Tech, 9-2
6.	2,536	UL-Monroe	2007	Tech, 3-2
7.	2,375	LSU	1987	Tech, 5-4
8.	2,220	Rice	2016	Tech, 4-3 (15)
9.	2,138	Arkansas	2007	Arkansas, 6-2
10.	2,095	UL-Lafayette	2016	Tech, 6-2

== Gallery ==
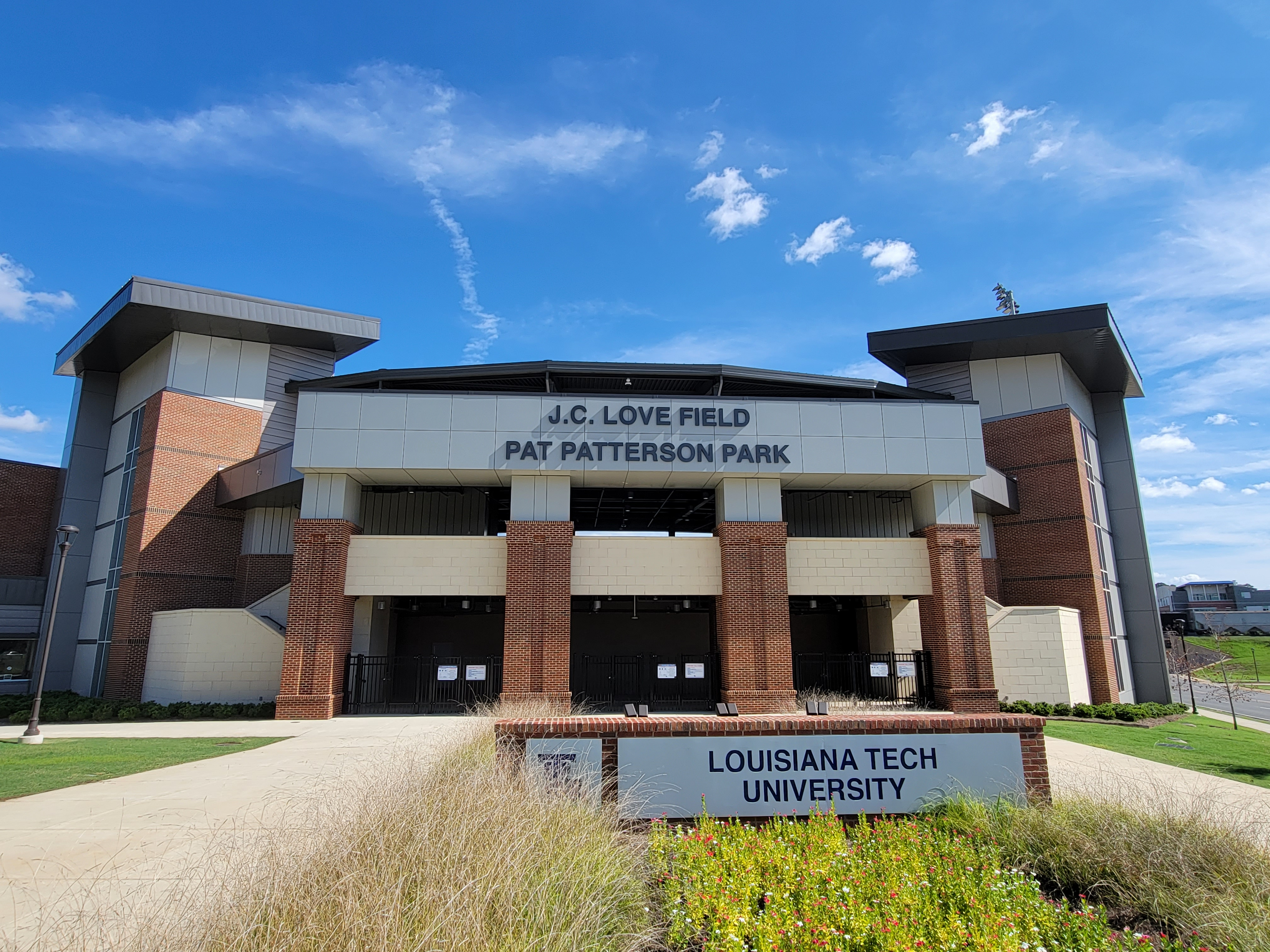
J. C. Love Field at Pat Patterson Park grandstand

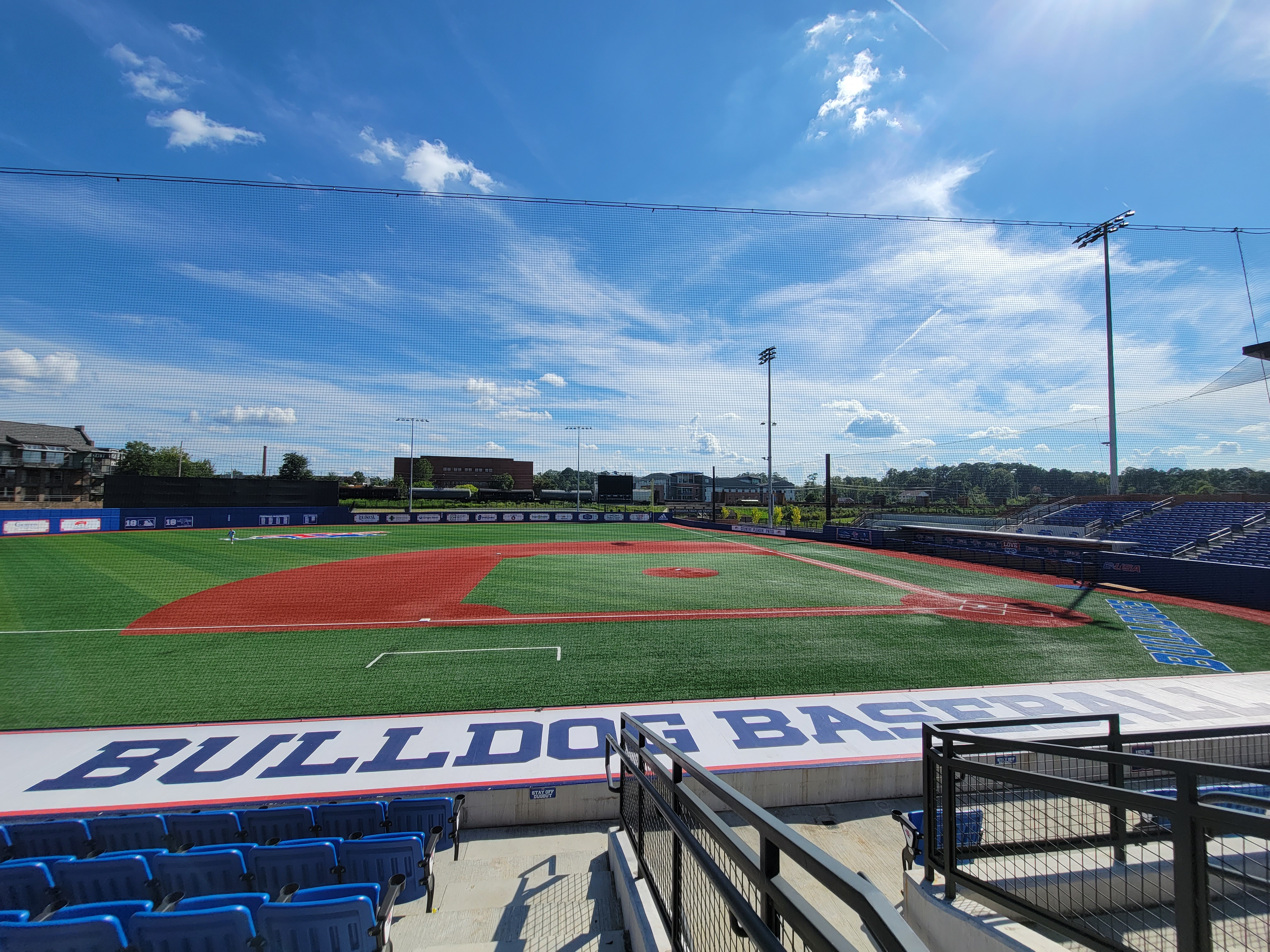
J. C. Love Field at Pat Patterson Park ball field

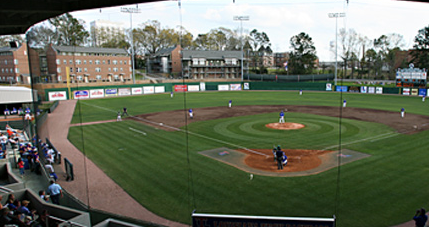
J. C. Love Field at Pat Patterson, left and center

== See also ==
- List of NCAA Division I baseball venues
