= FIU Panthers baseball =

FIU Panthers
- 2026 FIU Panthers baseball team
- Founded: 1973
- University: Florida International University
- Head coach: Pedro Grifol (1st season)
- Conference: C-USA
- Location: University Park, Florida
- Home stadium: FIU Baseball Stadium (capacity: 2,000)
- Nickname: Panthers
- Colors: Blue and gold

NCAA regional champions
- 2001

NCAA tournament appearances
- 1991, 1995, 1997, 1998, 1999, 2000, 2001, 2002, 2010, 2011, 2015

Conference tournament champions
- 1991, 1998, 1999, 2010, 2015

For information on all Florida International University sports, see FIU Panthers

The FIU Panthers baseball team is a varsity intercollegiate athletic team of Florida International University in University Park, Florida, United States. The team is a member of Conference USA, which is part of the National Collegiate Athletic Association's Division I. FIU's first baseball team was fielded in 1973. The team plays its home games at Infinity Insurance Park in Miami, Florida. The Panthers are coached by Pedro Grifol.

== FIU in the NCAA Tournament ==
Year	Record	Pct	Notes
1991	0–2	.000	Atlantic Regional
1995	1–2	.333	Atlantic II Regional
1997	0–2	.000	Atlantic Regional
1998	1–2	.333	Atlantic I Regional
1999	1–2	.333	Coral Gables Regional
2000	2–2	.500	Coral Gables Regional
2001	3-3	.500	South Bend Regional Champions, Los Angeles Super Regional
2002	0-2	.000	Gainesville Regional
2010	0-2	.000	Coral Gables Regional
2011	0-2	.000	Chapel Hill Regional
2015	1-2	.333	Coral Gables Regional
Totals	9–23	.281	

== Panthers in Major League Baseball ==
Since the Major League Baseball draft began in 1965, FIU has had 137 players selected.

== See also ==
- List of NCAA Division I baseball programs
