= Western Kentucky Hilltoppers baseball =

Western Kentucky Hilltoppers
- 2026 Western Kentucky Hilltoppers baseball team
- Founded: 1910; 116 years ago
- University: Western Kentucky University
- Head coach: Marc Rardin (4th season)
- Conference: C-USA
- Location: Bowling Green, Kentucky
- Home stadium: Nick Denes Field (Capacity: 1,500)
- Nickname: Hilltoppers
- Colors: Red and white

NCAA tournament appearances
- 1980, 2004, 2008, 2009, 2025

Conference tournament champions
- Ohio Valley: 1980; Sun Belt: 2004, 2008; CUSA: 2025

For information on all Western Kentucky University sports, see Western Kentucky Hilltoppers

The Western Kentucky Hilltoppers baseball team is a varsity intercollegiate athletic team of Western Kentucky University in Bowling Green, Kentucky, United States. The team is a member of Conference USA, which is part of the National Collegiate Athletic Association's Division I. Western Kentucky's first baseball team was fielded in 1910. The team plays its home games at Nick Denes Field in Bowling Green, Kentucky. The Hilltoppers are coached by Marc Rardin.

== Western Kentucky in the NCAA Tournament ==
Year	Record	Pct	Notes
1980	2–2	.500	South Regional
2004	1–2	.333	Oxford Regional
2008	0–2	.000	Stillwater Regional
2009	3–2	.600	Oxford Regional
2025	0–2	.000	Oxford Regional
TOTALS	6–10	.375	

== Hilltoppers in Major League Baseball ==
Since the Major League Baseball draft began in 1965, Western Kentucky has had 59 players selected.

== See also ==
- List of NCAA Division I baseball programs
