= 2007 Florida Atlantic Owls baseball team =

American college baseball season

2007 Florida Atlantic Owls baseball
- Conference: Sun Belt Conference
- Record: 36–22 (15–15 Sun Belt)
- Head coach: Kevin Cooney
- Home stadium: FAU Baseball Stadium

2007 Sun Belt Conference baseball standings
	Conf.				Overall
Team	W		L	PCT	W		L	PCT
Louisiana–Lafayette ‍†‍‍^{y}	23	–	7	.767	45	–	17	.726
New Orleans ‍‍‡‍^{y}	16	–	14	.533	38	–	26	.594
Middle Tennessee ‍‍‍	16	–	14	.533	32	–	28	.533
Troy ‍‍‍^{y}	16	–	14	.533	34	–	27	.557
Louisiana–Monroe ‍‍‍	15	–	14	.517	29	–	28	.509
Florida Atlantic ‍‍‍	15	–	15	.500	36	–	22	.621
Western Kentucky ‍‍‍	15	–	15	.500	17	–	30	.362
South Alabama ‍‍‍	13	–	16	.448	31	–	26	.544
Arkansas State ‍‍‍	13	–	17	.433	23	–	32	.418
FIU ‍‍‍	12	–	17	.414	26	–	29	.473
Arkansas–Little Rock ‍‍‍	9	–	20	.310	21	–	31	.404
† – Conference champion ‡ – Tournament champion y – Invited to the NCAA tournament As of June 30, 2007; Rankings from Collegiate Baseball

The 2007 Florida Atlantic Owls baseball team was the intercollegiate baseball team of Florida Atlantic University. They competed on the Division I level in the Sun Belt Conference. The 2007 team marked the first season of baseball to compete in the Sun Belt, as last year the Owls played in the Atlantic Sun Conference. After a disappointing 2006 season, FAU looked to bounce back in 2007, hoping to return to Regionals - possibly farther. However, the first season in the Sun Belt did not live up to expectations in Boca Raton, and the Owls finished the regular season at .500 in conference and were bounced from the Sun Belt Conference Tournament in their third game. For a second straight season, FAU would not reach the Regionals.

== 2007 schedule and results ==
Date	Opponent	Location	Result	Record	Notes
February 2, 2007	vs. Mississippi Valley State	Boca Raton, FL	W 8-1	1-0	
February 3, 2007^{1}	vs. Mississippi Valley State	Boca Raton, FL	W 33-3	2-0	7 innings
February 3, 2007^{1}	vs. Mississippi Valley State	Boca Raton, FL	W 11-7	3-0	
February 9, 2007	vs. Cincinnati	Boca Raton, FL	W 4-3	4-0	
February 10, 2007	vs. Cincinnati	Boca Raton, FL	W 14-13	5-0	12 innings
February 11, 2007	vs. Cincinnati	Boca Raton, FL	W 15-9	6-0	8 innings
February 16, 2007	vs. Ball State	Boca Raton, FL	W 8-3	7-0	
February 17, 2007	vs. #17 Oklahoma State	Boca Raton, FL	W 9-6	8-0	FAU's 1,500th game
February 18, 2007	vs. La Salle	Boca Raton, FL	W 16-8	9-0	
February 23, 2007	vs. #6 Rice	Houston, TX	L 4-2	9-1	FAU ranked #27 entering
February 24, 2007	vs. Texas A&M-Corpus Christi	Houston, TX	W 13-12	10-1	
February 25, 2007	vs. #19 Nebraska	Houston, TX	L 8-7	10-2	
February 26, 2007	at St. Louis Cardinals (exh.)^{2}	Jupiter, FL	L 3-2	10-2	
March 2, 2007	vs. Villanova	Boca Raton, FL	W 12-3	11-2	
March 3, 2007	vs. Boston College	Boca Raton, FL	L 6-5	11-3	Drops from ranking after loss
March 4, 2007	vs. Boston College	Boca Raton, FL	W 15-3	12-3	
March 6, 2007	vs. Maine	Boca Raton, FL	W 3-1	13-3	
March 9, 2007	at Western Kentucky	Bowling Green, KY	W 13-3	14-3 (1-0)	
March 10, 2007	at Western Kentucky	Bowling Green, KY	L 12-11	14-4 (1-1)	
March 11, 2007	at Western Kentucky	Bowling Green, KY	W 9-7	15-4 (2-1)	
March 13, 2007	vs. Rutgers	Boca Raton, FL	W 9-4	16-4	
March 14, 2007	vs. Northern Illinois	Boca Raton, FL	W 13-7	17-4	
March 16, 2007	vs. Troy	Boca Raton, FL	L 12-6	17-5 (2-2)	
March 17, 2007	vs. Troy	Boca Raton, FL	L 8-3	17-6 (2-3)	
March 18, 2007	vs. Troy	Boca Raton, FL	L 13-5	17-7 (2-4)	
March 21, 2007	vs. Dartmouth	Boca Raton, FL	W 14-6	18-7	
March 23, 2007	at Louisiana-Lafayette	Lafayette, LA	L 5-2	18-8 (2-5)	
March 24, 2007	at Louisiana-Lafayette	Lafayette, LA	L 5-2	18-9 (2-6)	
March 25, 2007	at Louisiana-Lafayette	Lafayette, LA	L 3-2	18-10 (2-7)	
March 27, 2007	vs. Harvard	Boca Raton, FL	W 10-9	19-10	
March 30, 2007	vs. Arkansas State	Boca Raton, FL	W 5-2	20-10 (3-7)	Cooney's 700th FAU win
March 31, 2007	vs. Arkansas State	Boca Raton, FL	W 6-5	21-10 (4-7)	
April 1, 2007	vs. Arkansas State	Boca Raton, FL	L 9-6	21-11 (4-8)	
April 6, 2007	at Louisiana-Monroe	Monroe, LA	W 3-1	22-11 (5-8)	
April 7, 2007^{3}	at Louisiana-Monroe	Monroe, LA	W 5-2	23-11 (6-8)	
April 7, 2007^{3}	at Louisiana-Monroe	Monroe, LA	L 7-6	23-12 (6-9)	
April 10, 2007	at Bethune Cookman	Daytona Beach, FL			Ppd. due to rain
April 13, 2007	vs. UALR	Boca Raton, FL	L 7-6	23-13 (6-10)	
April 14, 2007	vs. UALR	Boca Raton, FL	L 3-2	23-14 (6-11)	
April 15, 2007	vs. UALR	Boca Raton, FL	W 4-2	24-14 (7-11)	
April 17, 2007	vs. North Florida	Boca Raton, FL	W 4-2	25-14	
April 20, 2007	at New Orleans	New Orleans, LA	L 8-4	25-15 (7-12)	
April 21, 2007	at New Orleans	New Orleans, LA	W 10-9	26-15 (8-12)	
April 22, 2007	at New Orleans	New Orleans, LA	L 11-9	26-16 (8-13)	
April 26, 2007	vs. South Alabama	Boca Raton, FL	W 9-3	27-16 (9-13)	
April 27, 2007	vs. South Alabama	Boca Raton, FL	W 6-5	28-16 (10-13)	
April 28, 2007	vs. South Alabama	Boca Raton, FL	L 11-9	28-17 (10-14)	
May 4, 2007	at Middle Tennessee	Murfreesboro, TN			Ppd. due to rain
May 5, 2007^{4}	at Middle Tennessee	Murfreesboro, TN	W 16-1	29-17 (11-14)	
May 5, 2007^{4}	at Middle Tennessee	Murfreesboro, TN	W 8-4	30-17 (12-14)	
May 6, 2007	at Middle Tennessee	Murfreesboro, TN	L 12-7	30-18 (12-15)	
May 8, 2007	vs. Bethune Cookman^{5}	Daytona Beach, FL	L 5-2	30-19	
May 10, 2007	vs. Bethune Cookman	Boca Raton, FL	L 6-5	30-20	
May 11, 2007	vs. Bethune Cookman	Boca Raton, FL	W 4-2	31-20	
May 12, 2007	vs. Bethune Cookman	Boca Raton, FL	W 14-2	32-20	
May 17, 2007	vs. FIU	Boca Raton, FL	W 17-9	33-20 (13-15)	
May 18, 2007	vs. FIU	Boca Raton, FL	W 5-0	34-20 (14-15)	
May 19, 2007	vs. FIU	Boca Raton, FL	W 11-10	35-20 (15-15)	
May 23, 2007	vs. Middle Tennessee	Mobile, AL	L 6-1	0-1	G1 of SBC Tournament
May 24, 2007	vs. Western Kentucky	Mobile, AL	W 7-6	1-1	G5 (Loser Bracket)
May 25, 2007	vs. Middle Tennessee	Mobile, AL	L 7-4	1-2	G9 (FAU Eliminated)
* Sun Belt Conference games in GREEN. ^{1} February 3 was a double-header against MVSU. ^{2} The exhibition game against the St. Louis Cardinals does not count against the Owls' record. ^{3} April 7 was a double-header against ULM. ^{4} May 5 was a double-header against MTSU, to make up for the rain-out on May 4. ^{5} May 8 was a make-up against BCC, to make up for the rain-out on April 10.

== 2007 Roster ==
=== Starting lineup ===
Starters based on number of games started at each position.

- Center Field: 13 Marion Streptfert (So.)
- Second Base: 13 Kyle Doherty(Fr.)
- Right Field: 12 Robbie Widlansky (Jr.)
- Left Field: 25 Mike McKenna (Jr.)
- Third Base: 13 Alfonzo Gonzales (So.)
- Catcher: 11 Justin Martin (Sr.)
- Designated Hitter: 4 Tyler Stevens (Sr.)
- First Base: 19 Travis Ozga (So.)
- Shortstop: 14 Nick Arata (Sr.)

=== Reserves ===
- 5 Ryan Cheatham (Fr.)
- 22 Billy Degnan (Jr.)
- 23 Justin Ferreira (Jr.)
- 44 Riaan Spanjer-Furstenburg (Fr.)

=== Pitchers ===
- 7 Mickey Storey (Jr.)
- 16 Mike Obradovich (Jr.)
- 17 Joel Schmal (Sr.)
- 18 Brett Cannon (Jr.)
- 24 Alex Pepe (So.)
- 26 Lou Morey (Fr.)
- 27 Chris Eberhart (Jr.)
- 30 Brandon Cooney (Sr.)
- 31 Andrew Tomlin (Sr.)
- 32 Justin Phillabaum (Jr.)
- 33 Anthony Bradley (Sr.)
- 34 Chris Salberg (Sr.)
- 36 Mike Salivar (Jr.)
- 49 Brandon Kloess (Sr.)

== Team leaders ==
Minimum to qualify in statistics: 1.0 inning/game played or game pitched.

=== Offense ===
- Average: Robbie Widlansky (.433)
- Runs batted in: Robbie Widlansky (69)
- Home runs: Williams Block (18)
- Hits: Robbie Widlansky (104)
- Doubles: Robbie Widlansky (24)
- Triples: Williams Block / Daniel Bomback (3)
- Runs: Daniel Bomback (67)
- Walks: Mike McKenna (36)
- Stolen bases: Daniel Cook (15)
- On-base percentage: Robbie Widlansky (.498)
- Slugging percentage: Robbie Widlansky (.729)

=== Pitching ===
- Wins: Mike Obradovich (9)
- Earned run average: Chris Salberg (3.05)
- Innings pitched: Chris Salberg (100.1)
- Saves: Mike Obradovich (3)
- Appearances: Chris Salberg (25)
- Games started: Mike Obradovich (13)
- Complete games: Mike Obradovich / Chris Salberg (2)
- Earned runs: Alex Pepe (18)
- Strikeouts: Chris Salberg (124)

=== Defense ===
- Percentage: Travis Ozga (.990)
- Putouts: Travia Ozga (365)
- Assists: Daniel Bomback (158)
- Chances: Travis Ozga (405)
- Errors: Chris Salberg (1)
- Double-plays: Daniel Bomback (27)

== Awards and honors ==
=== All-American ===
Junior outfielder Robbie Widlansky was named a 2007 Louisville Slugger All-American, becoming the 11th FAU baseball player to be honored as an All-American.

=== Conference Player of the Year ===
Widlansky was named the 2007 Sun Belt Conference Player of the Year. He finished the 2007 season with a .433 batting average, 15 home runs, 69 RBIs, and started all 55 games for the Owls. Widlansky broke FAU single season records for: hits (101) and total bases (170).

=== All-Conference ===
- First Team All-Conference Honors
  - 3B Williams Block (Sophomore)
  - OF Robbie Widlansky (Junior)
- Second Team All-Conference Honors
  - SP Chris Salberg (Senior)
  - OF Mike McKenna (Junior)
  - OF Daniel Cook (Junior)

=== Batting Champion ===
Widlansky won the Sun Belt Conference Batting Title (.433).

== Records broken in 2007 ==
2007 saw a handful of school records broken.

- Junior outfielder Robbie Widlansky broke the single-season batting record (.430).
- Junior outfielder Mike McKenna joined Widlansky to mark the first time two Owls would bat over .400 in a single-season (.414).
- Widlansky broke the single-season school record for hits (101) and total bases (170).

== 2007 MLB First-Year Player Draft ==
Owls selected in the 2007 MLB First-Year Player Draft:

Player	Class	Round	Pick	Team
Anthony Rizzo	HS Signee	6	204	Boston
Robbie Widlansky	Junior	11	339	Baltimore
Daniel Cook	Junior	20	610	Washington
Mickey Storey	Junior	22	692	Minnesota
Stephen Vento	HS Signee	23	697	Chicago NL
Justin Phillabaum	Junior	29	880	Washington
Brandon Cooney	Senior	30	909	Baltimore
Daniel Bomback	Junior	42	1427	Pittsburgh
