= 2020 Florida Atlantic Owls baseball team =

American college baseball season

2020 Florida Atlantic Owls baseball
- Conference: Conference USA
- Record: 10-6 (0-0 C-USA)
- Head coach: John McCormack
- Home stadium: FAU Baseball Stadium

2020 Conference USA baseball standings
	Conf.						Overall
Team	W		L		T	PCT	W		L		T	PCT
Old Dominion ‍‍‍	0	–	0	–	0	–	12	–	4	–	0	.750
Southern Miss ‍‍‍	0	–	0	–	0	–	12	–	4	–	0	.750
FIU ‍‍‍	0	–	0	–	0	–	10	–	5	–	0	.667
Louisiana Tech ‍‍‍	0	–	0	–	0	–	11	–	6	–	0	.647
Florida Atlantic ‍‍‍	0	–	0	–	0	–	10	–	6	–	0	.625
Western Kentucky ‍‍‍	0	–	0	–	0	–	10	–	6	–	0	.625
UTSA ‍‍‍	0	–	0	–	0	–	10	–	7	–	0	.588
Charlotte ‍‍‍	0	–	0	–	0	–	9	–	8	–	0	.529
UAB ‍‍‍	0	–	0	–	0	–	7	–	9	–	0	.438
Middle Tennessee ‍‍‍	0	–	0	–	0	–	7	–	10	–	0	.412
Marshall ‍‍‍	0	–	0	–	0	–	4	–	10	–	1	.300
Rice ‍‍‍	0	–	0	–	0	–	2	–	14	–	0	.125
x – Division champion † – Conference champion ‡ – Tournament champion y – Invited to the NCAA tournament As of March 16, 2020; Rankings from D1Baseball

The 2020 Florida Atlantic Owls baseball team represented Florida Atlantic University in the sport of baseball for the 2020 college baseball season. The Owls competed in Division I of the National Collegiate Athletic Association (NCAA) and the Conference USA. They played their home games at FAU Baseball Stadium, on the university's Boca Raton, Florida, campus. The team was coached by John McCormack, who was in his eleventh season at Florida Atlantic. On March 16, 2020, the Conference USA announced that all spring sport competition and championships, including baseball, have been cancelled.

== Previous season ==
The 2019 Owls finished 41–21 overall, and 22–8 in the conference. They lost in the Athens Regional during the 2019 NCAA Division I baseball tournament.

== Preseason ==
=== C-USA media poll ===
The Conference USA pre poll was released on January 29, 2020 with the Owls predicted to finish in second place.

Media poll
Predicted finish	Team	1st Place Votes
1	Southern Miss	6
2	Florida Atlantic	4
3	Louisiana Tech	-
4	Old Dominion	-
5	Rice	1
6	FIU	1
7	WKU	-
8	UAB	-
9	UTSA	-
10	Marshall	-
11	Charlotte	-
12	Middle Tennessee	-

== Schedule and results ==
2020 Florida Atlantic Owls baseball game log
Regular season

February
Date	Opponent	Rank	Site/stadium	Score	Win	Loss	Save	Attendance	Overall record	C-USA record
February 14	Delaware	No. 40	FAU Baseball Stadium; Boca Raton, FL	8–4	**Reese** (1–0)	Ludman (0–1)	None	787	1–0	0-0
February 15	Delaware	No. 40	FAU Baseball Stadium	9–5	**Kostantis** (1–0)	Silan (0–1)	None	718	2–0	0-0
February 16	Delaware	No. 40	FAU Baseball Stadium	8-2^{5} ^{[a]}	**Ireson** (1–0)	Wakeley (0–1)	None	532	3–0	0-0
February 18	Florida Gulf Coast		FAU Baseball Stadium	6–4	**Entenza** (1–0)	T. Shuck (0–2)	**Hartigan** (1)	620	4–0	0-0
February 21	Binghamton		FAU Baseball Stadium	9–8	**Entenza** (2–0)	DiRado (0–1)	None	534	5–0	0-0
February 22	Binghamton		FAU Baseball Stadium	Postponed (rain) Makeup: February 23 as a doubleheader						
February 23 (1)	Binghamton		FAU Baseball Stadium	9–4	**Reese** (2–0)	Satriale (0–1)	None	598	6–0	0-0
February 23 (2)	Binghamton		FAU Baseball Stadium	11–4	**Visconti** (1–0)	Kopcza (0–1)	None	598	7–0	0-0
February 28	No. 5 Texas Tech		Dick Howser Stadium; Tallahassee, FL	1–7	Brustoski (1–0)	**Reese** (2–1)	None	4,249	7–1	0-0
February 28	No. 9 Florida State		Dick Howser Stadium	1–5	Van Eyk (1–0)	**Josey** (0–1)	None	4,249	7–2	0-0
February 29	No. 9 Florida State		Dick Howser Stadium	6–16	Anderson (1–0)	**Waterbor** (0–1)	Ahearn (1)	5,443	7–3	0-0

:^{^[a]}Shortened due to rain

March
Date	Opponent	Rank	Site/stadium	Score	Win	Loss	Save	Attendance	Overall record	C-USA record
March 3	No. 1 Florida		FITTEAM Ballpark of the Palm Beaches; West Palm Beach, FL	3–7	Luethje (2–0)	**DeGusipe** (0–1)	None	1,984	7–4	0-0
March 4	No. 7 Miami (FL)		FAU Baseball Stadium	11–2	**Cooley** (1–0)	McFarlane (1–2)	None	1,166	8–4	0-0
March 6	Northeastern		FAU Baseball Stadium	4–2	**Josey** (1–1)	Murphy (2–2)	**Hartigan** (2)	501	9–4	0-0
March 7	Northeastern		FAU Baseball Stadium	7–10	Jacobsak (2–1)	**Reese** (2–2)	Dufault (3)	551	9–5	0-0
March 8	Northeastern		FAU Baseball Stadium	1–6	Keane (3–1)	**Visconti** (1–1)	None	464	9–6	0-0
March 10	Penn		FAU Baseball Stadium	5–0	**Entenza** (3–0)	Shoemaker (0–1)	None	549	10–6	0-0
March 11	Penn		FAU Baseball Stadium	Cancelled						
March 13	Old Dominion		Bud Metheny Baseball Complex; Norfolk, VA	Canceled (COVID-19 pandemic)						
March 14	Old Dominion		Bud Metheny Baseball Complex	Canceled (COVID-19 pandemic)						
March 15	Old Dominion		Bud Metheny Baseball Complex	Canceled (COVID-19 pandemic)						
March 18	Marist		FAU Baseball Stadium	Canceled (COVID-19 pandemic)						
March 20	UAB		FAU Baseball Stadium	Canceled (COVID-19 pandemic)						
March 21	UAB		FAU Baseball Stadium	Canceled (COVID-19 pandemic)						
March 22	UAB		FAU Baseball Stadium	Canceled (COVID-19 pandemic)						
March 24	Miami (FL)		Alex Rodriguez Park; Coral Gables, FL	Canceled (COVID-19 pandemic)						
March 27	Louisiana Tech		J. C. Love Field at Pat Patterson Park; Ruston, LA	Canceled (COVID-19 pandemic)						
March 28	Louisiana Tech		J. C. Love Field at Pat Patterson Park	Canceled (COVID-19 pandemic)						
March 29	Louisiana Tech		J. C. Love Field at Pat Patterson Park	Canceled (COVID-19 pandemic)						
March 31	UCF		John Euliano Park; Orlando, FL	Canceled (COVID-19 pandemic)						

April
Date	Opponent	Rank	Site/stadium	Score	Win	Loss	Save	Attendance	Overall record	C-USA record
April 3	Southern Miss		FAU Baseball Stadium	Canceled (COVID-19 pandemic)						
April 4	Southern Miss		FAU Baseball Stadium	Canceled (COVID-19 pandemic)						
April 5	Southern Miss		FAU Baseball Stadium	Canceled (COVID-19 pandemic)						
April 7	UCF		FAU Baseball Stadium	Canceled (COVID-19 pandemic)						
April 9	Middle Tennessee		Reese Smith Jr. Field; Murfreesboro, TN	Canceled (COVID-19 pandemic)						
April 10	Middle Tennessee		Reese Smith Jr. Field	Canceled (COVID-19 pandemic)						
April 11	Middle Tennessee		Reese Smith Jr. Field	Canceled (COVID-19 pandemic)						
April 15	Miami (FL)		Alex Rodriguez Park	Canceled (COVID-19 pandemic)						
April 17	WKU		FAU Baseball Stadium	Canceled (COVID-19 pandemic)						
April 18	WKU		FAU Baseball Stadium	Canceled (COVID-19 pandemic)						
April 19	WKU		FAU Baseball Stadium	Canceled (COVID-19 pandemic)						
April 21	Florida		McKethan Stadium; Gainesville, FL	Canceled (COVID-19 pandemic)						
April 24	FIU		Infinity Insurance Park; Miami, FL	Canceled (COVID-19 pandemic)						
April 25	FIU		Infinity Insurance Park	Canceled (COVID-19 pandemic)						
April 26	FIU		Infinity Insurance Park	Canceled (COVID-19 pandemic)						
April 28	Bethune–Cookman		FAU Baseball Stadium	Canceled (COVID-19 pandemic)						

May
Date	Opponent	Rank	Site/stadium	Score	Win	Loss	Save	Attendance	Overall record	C-USA record
May 1	UTSA		FAU Baseball Stadium	Canceled (COVID-19 pandemic)						
May 2	UTSA		FAU Baseball Stadium	Canceled (COVID-19 pandemic)						
May 3	UTSA		FAU Baseball Stadium	Canceled (COVID-19 pandemic)						
May 5	Florida Gulf Coast		Swanson Stadium; Fort Myers, FL	Canceled (COVID-19 pandemic)						
May 8	Rice		Reckling Park; Houston, TX	Canceled (COVID-19 pandemic)						
May 9	Rice		Reckling Park	Canceled (COVID-19 pandemic)						
May 10	Rice		Reckling Park	Canceled (COVID-19 pandemic)						
May 14	Charlotte		FAU Baseball Stadium	Canceled (COVID-19 pandemic)						
May 15	Charlotte		FAU Baseball Stadium	Canceled (COVID-19 pandemic)						
May 16	Charlotte		FAU Baseball Stadium	Canceled (COVID-19 pandemic)						

Legend: = Win = Loss = Cancelled
Bold = Florida Atlantic team member

Schedule source:

== Roster ==
2020 Florida Atlantic Owls roster
Pitchers: 2 - Jacob Josey - Sophomore; 12 - Corey Ireson - Junior; 14 - Zach Asnes - (redshirt) Junior; 15 - Brycen Allen - (redshirt) Junior; 16 - Adrien Reese - Junior; 18 - Hunter Cooley - Sophomore; 21 - Jon Jon Kostantis - Sophomore; 22 - Jackson Vescelus - (redshirt) Junior; 26 - Jack Stroud - Freshman; 27 - Dylan O'Connell - (redshirt) Junior; 29 - Evan Waterbor - Sophomore; 30 - Michael Schuler - Sophomore; 31 - Dylan Carter - Senior; 34 - Ryan Sandberg - (redshirt) Junior; 35 - Mike Entenza - Junior; 37 - Dante Visconti - Freshman; 38 - Matt Sparling - (redshirt) Junior; 40 - Ethan Kramer - Freshman; 41 - Marc DeGusipe - Freshman	Catchers: 25 - Tucker Mitchell - Freshman; 33 - Nicolas Toney - Sophomore; Infielders: 1 - Cade Parker - Freshman; 4 - Wilfredo Alvarez - Senior; 5 - Garrett Evans - (redshirt) Freshman; 6 - Francisco Urbaez - Senior; 7 - Alex Arauz - Junior; 8 - Andru Summerall - (redshirt) Junior; 9 - B.J. Murray - Sophomore; 13 - Steven Loden - Freshman; 19 - Jared DeSantolo - Junior	Outfielders: 10 - Bobby Morgensen - Senior; 11 - Jackson Wenstrom - Junior; 17 - Charlie Concannon - Graduate Student; 23 - Victor Castillo - Freshman; 24 - Mitchell Hartigan - Sophomore

== Coaching staff ==
Coaching Staff
- John McCormack - Head Coach - 12th year
- Greg Mamula - Hitting Coach - 5th year
- David Kopp - Pitching Coach - 3rd year
- Tristan McGinnis - Volunteer Assistant Coach - 1st year
- Gunnar Lambert - Graduate Manager - 1st year

== Rankings ==
Ranking movements Legend: ██ Increase in ranking ██ Decrease in ranking — = Not ranked RV = Received votes
	Week					
Poll	Pre	1	2	3	4	Final
Coaches'	RV	RV*		—	—	—
Baseball America	—	—	—	—	—	—
Collegiate Baseball^	40	—	—	—	—	—
NCBWA†	RV	RV	RV	RV	—	—
D1Baseball	—	—	—	—	—	—

^ Collegiate Baseball ranked 40 teams in their preseason poll, but only ranked 30 teams weekly during the season.
† NCBWA ranks 30 teams in their preseason poll, but only ranks 25 teams weekly during the season.
* A new poll was not released for this week, so for comparison purposes, the previous week's ranking is inserted in this week's slot.

== Awards ==
Weekly awards
Player	Award	Date awarded	Ref.
Mitchell Hartigan	C-USA Co-Hitter of the Week	February 24, 2020	
