= Florida Atlantic Owls =

Florida Atlantic University sports teams

- University: Florida Atlantic University
- Nickname: Owls
- NCAA: Division I (FBS)
- Conference: American Conference (primary); CUSA (beach volleyball); ASUN (men's swimming & diving)
- Athletic director: Josh McCowan
- Location: Boca Raton, Florida
- Varsity teams: 19 (8 men's, 11 women's)
- Football stadium: Flagler Credit Union Stadium
- Basketball arena: Eleanor R. Baldwin Arena
- Baseball stadium: FAU Baseball Stadium
- Softball stadium: FAU Softball Stadium
- Soccer stadium: FAU Soccer Stadium
- Colors: Blue and red
- Mascot: Owlsley and Hoot
- Fight song: FAU Fight Song
- Website: fausports.com

The Florida Atlantic Owls are the athletics teams of Florida Atlantic University. The Owls participate in the National Collegiate Athletic Association (NCAA)'s Division I as members of the American Conference. On October 21, 2021, Florida Atlantic accepted the invitation to join The American and became a full member on July 1, 2023.

Florida Atlantic has attracted high-profile coaches in the past for various sports, including Howard Schnellenberger and Lane Kiffin for football and Mike Jarvis for basketball. Other former coaches include Matt Doherty, Rex Walters, and Sidney Green. As of March 2018, the Owls are led by athletic director Brian White. The 2023 men's basketball team made school history by making the Final Four of the 2023 NCAA Division I men's basketball tournament.

== The Owls ==
The logo and mascot of Florida Atlantic University's athletic teams is the burrowing owl. Owlsley and Hoot are the names of the mascots for Florida Atlantic University. The presence of this bird has been popular on the land of the university, even preceding the construction of FAU. At the dedication ceremony in 1964, President Lyndon B. Johnson even made notice and reference to the popular presence of the bird. In 1971, the National Audubon Society designated FAU's land an official owl sanctuary, honoring the tradition of the bird's presence and moving to protect the birds from attempts to expand construction of the university. Owls are still dominant in their presence on the Boca Raton campus to this day. With the addition of intercollegiate athletics in the mid-1980s, the university used the bird as its mascot - an animal that denotes wisdom, determination and cognizance.

=== Conference affiliations ===
Division	Years	Conference affiliation
NAIA District 25	1975–76 to 1983–84	Independent
NCAA Division II	1983–84 to 1992–93	Independent
NCAA Division I	1993–94 to 2005–06	Trans America Athletic Conference (now Atlantic Sun Conference)
NCAA Division I	2006–07 to 2012–13	Sun Belt Conference
NCAA Division I	2013–14 to 2022–23	Conference USA
NCAA Division I	2023–24 to present	American Conference

== Sports sponsored ==
American logo in Florida Atlantic's colors

Men's sports	Women's sports
Baseball	Basketball
Basketball	Beach volleyball^{3}
Cross country	Cross country
Football	Golf
Golf	Soccer
Soccer	Softball
Swimming and diving^{2}	Swimming and diving
Tennis	Tennis
	Track and field^{1}
	Volleyball
^{1}includes both indoor and outdoor^{2}as of the 2023–24 season, competes in the ASUN Conference.^{3}remained an associate member of Conference USA after the school otherwise left the conference.

=== Football ===
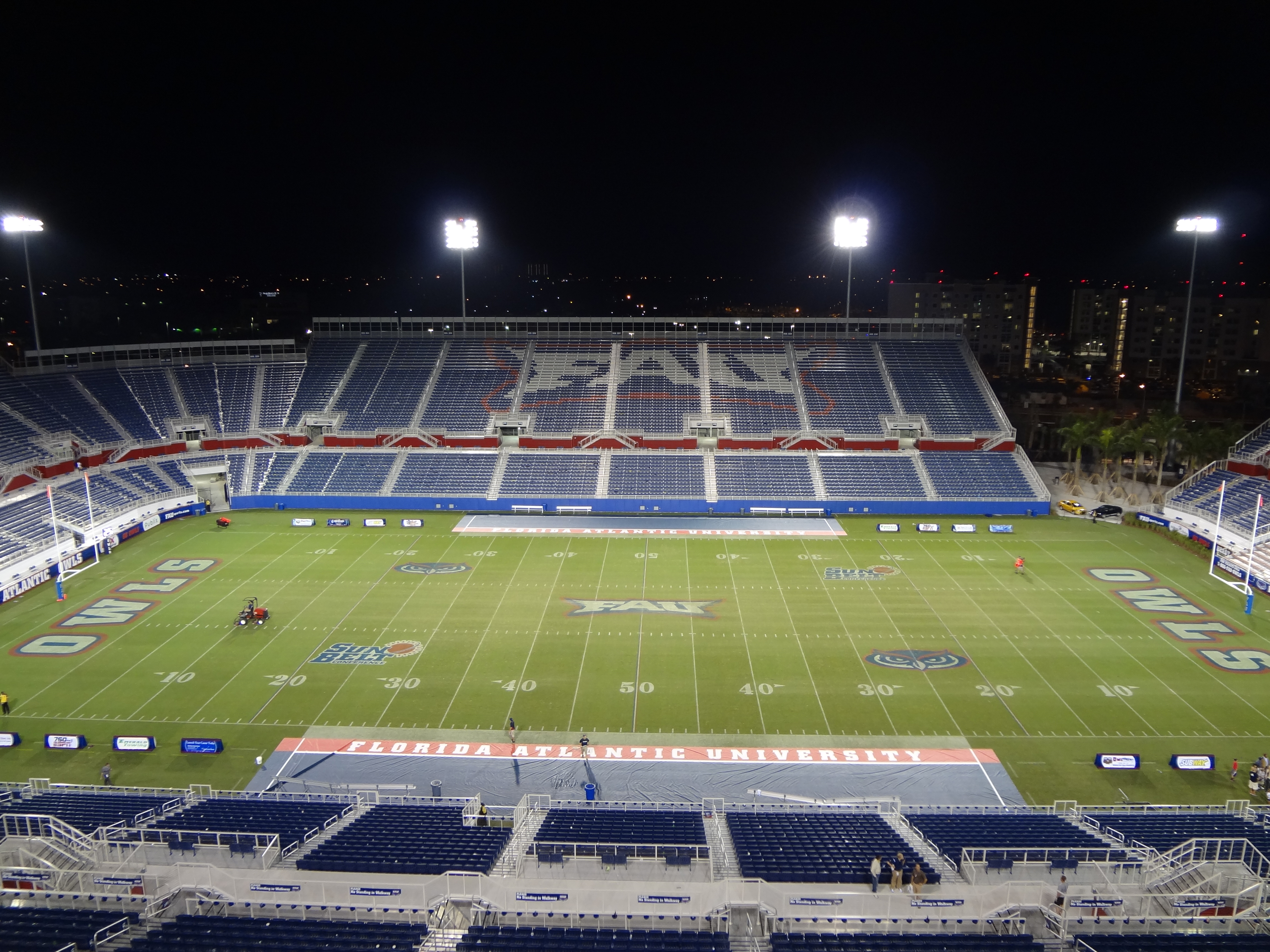
Flagler Credit Union Stadium, current home of the Owls football team

Florida Atlantic University fielded its first football team in 2001, coached by former Miami and Louisville coach Howard Schnellenberger. Their first game was a 40–7 loss against Slippery Rock University on September 1, 2001. After just four seasons of existence, the Owls jumped from Division I-AA (now FCS) competition to Division I-A (now FBS), joining the Sun Belt Conference. Through the 2008 season, after eight years of competing in football, the Owls are 47–47 overall. In 2007 they competed in their first bowl game, the New Orleans Bowl, where they defeated the Memphis Tigers 44–27. In 2008, the Owls competed in their second straight bowl game, the Motor City Bowl, where they defeated the Central Michigan Chippewas by a score of 24–21.

In 2010, quarterback Rusty Smith became the first FAU player to be drafted.

The Owls opened their new on-campus FAU Stadium (now Flagler Credit Union Stadium on October 15, 2011, against Western Kentucky.

The Owls' natural rivals are the FIU Panthers, located just 50 miles from Florida Atlantic. The rivals meet annually in a conference match up named the Shula Bowl, after Miami Dolphins coach Don Shula. FAU leads the all-time series thirteen games to four.

On December 5, 2011, the football program hired its second coach in its history; former University of Nebraska Defensive Coordinator, Carl Pelini. In 2013, the Owls joined Conference USA. On December 16, 2013, the program hired its third coach in its history; Charlie Partridge.

On December 12, 2016, the program hired the fourth coach in program history; Lane Kiffin. Kiffin was formerly the head coach for the Oakland Raiders of the NFL, the University of Tennessee Volunteers, and the University of Southern California as well as the former Offensive Coordinator for the University of Alabama under Nick Saban. He led the Owls to two conference championships in 2017 and 2019, as well as a 2017 Boca Raton Bowl victory, where the Owls defeated the Akron Zips by a score of 50–3.

On December 11, 2019, FAU announced the hiring of former Florida State University head coach Willie Taggart as the next head coach. On December 21, 2019, former interim head coach and current University of South Florida defensive coordinator Glenn Spencer led the Owls to their fourth bowl victory in the Boca Raton Bowl, where the Owls defeated the SMU Mustangs by a score of 52–28.

=== Baseball ===
Florida Atlantic Baseball fielded its first squad in 1981. Since inception FAU has had only three coaches. Kevin Cooney, the most successful coach in school history, was the Florida Atlantic head baseball coach from 1988 through 2008. By many accounts, Cooney built a mid-major dynasty in the baseball world. University of Cincinnati head coach Brian Cleary called FAU "one of the country's best baseball programs," and added, "it's been an incredibly successful program over the last several years." Coach Cooney won his 800th career game on March 15, 2006, when FAU played Columbia. At FAU, Cooney won more than 700 games.

The Owls baseball team plays its home games at FAU Baseball Stadium.

Currently the Owls are coached by long-time assistant for Cooney, John McCormack. McCormack was an assistant under Cooney at FAU for 18 seasons.

40+ years of Florida Atlantic baseball:

- 12 Regionals (1985, 1993, 1999, 2000, 2002, 2003, 2004, 2005, 2010, 2013, 2015, 2018, 2019)
- 1 Super Regional (2002)
- 7 Regular Season Conference Championships (1983, 1999, 2003, 2010, 2012, 2016, 2019)
- 2 Conference Tournament Championships (2004, 2013)
- NCAA record of 34 consecutive wins (February 19, 1999 – March 16, 1999)
- 21 All-Americans
- 10 Freshmen All-Americans
- 112 players sign professionally
- 12 players reach the majors

=== Basketball ===
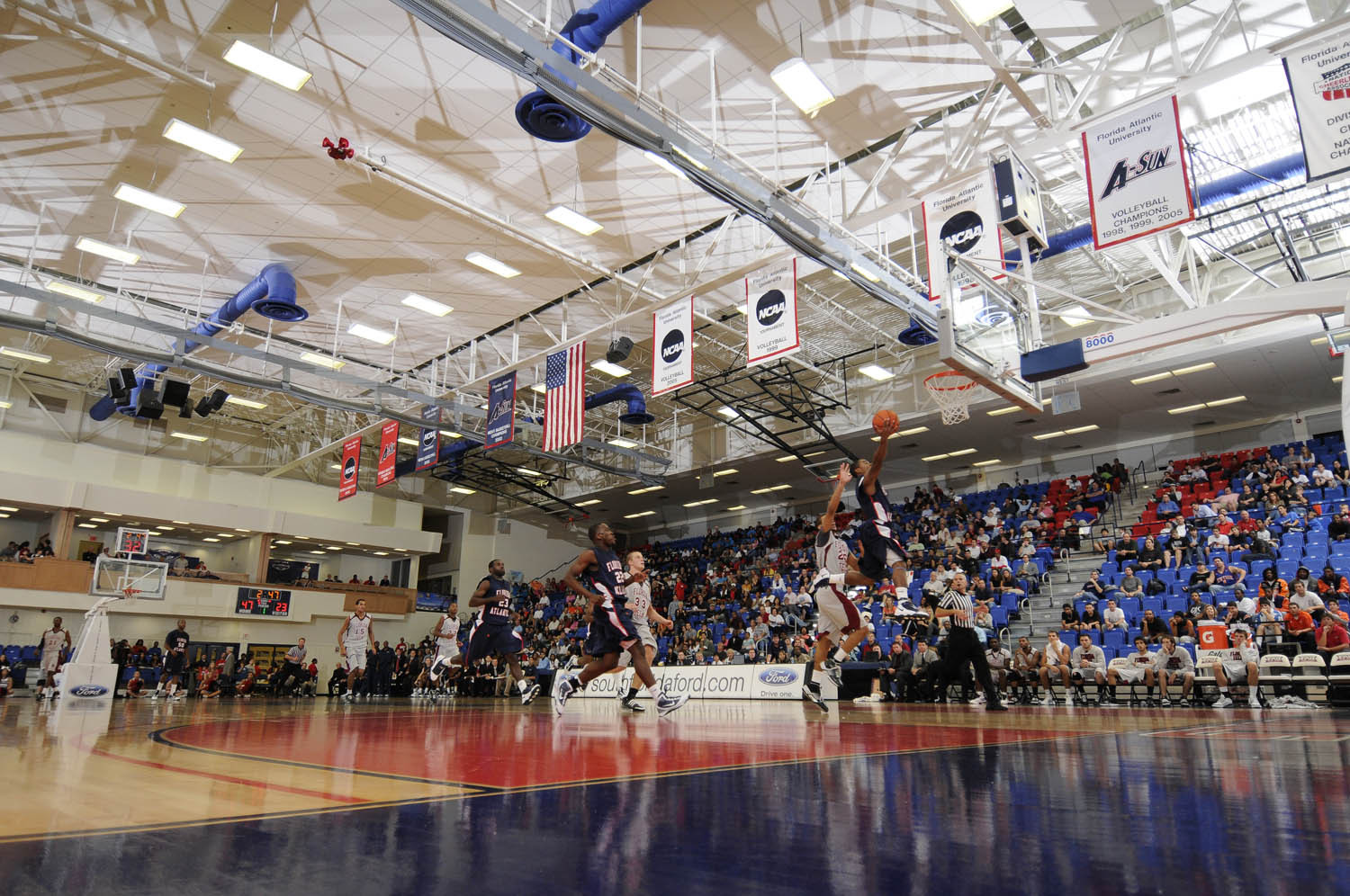
The Burrow

FAU basketball began play in 1988 and in its 19+ seasons has experienced limited success, marred with frequent coaching changes. Along with the other FAU athletics teams, basketball entered the Sun Belt Conference in the 2006–2007 season, and has shown signs of maturing into a national competitor. The Owls competed on the Division II level from 1988 to 1993 before joining the Atlantic Sun Conference when moving to Division I in the 1993–1994 season.

- December 1, 1998: FAU played Oklahoma State in the Gallagher-Iba Arena in Stillwater, Oklahoma. The Cowboys were undefeated and ranked in the top 10 of both national polls. FAU shocked the nation and upset OSU 83–81. This is still considered the biggest upset in FAU basketball history.
- 2002 season: FAU won the Atlantic Sun Conference Championship, defeating Georgia State 76–75 in the Championship Game of the conference tournament. The Owls received a 15-seed in the national tournament, but fell short in a bid to upset 2nd-seeded Alabama.
- December 23, 2023: FAU played Arizona in the T-Mobile Arena in Las Vegas, Nevada as part of the Desert Holiday Classic. Both Arizona and FAU came into the game with 9 wins and ranked in the top 15 in both of the national polls. FAU beat the Wildcats 96–95 in double overtime, and this was the first time FAU had beat a top 10 team.

The Owls were coached by Rex Walters in 2006–2008, a former standout at Kansas. Walters played a major role in the Jayhawks' run to the Final Four in 1993. Coach Walters became the 6th head coach of FAU basketball, after Matt Doherty left the university a year into his tenure to coach at SMU.

The Owls are currently coached by John Jakus, in his first head coaching opportunity. He succeeded Dusty May, who had led the Owls to the 2023 Final Four, when May left after the 2023–24 season for the head coaching vacancy at Michigan.

The Owls play at Eleanor R. Baldwin Arena, formerly known as FAU Arena & RoofClaim.com Arena and commonly referred to as The Burrow.

In the 2023 NCAA Division I men's basketball tournament, the men's basketball team has advanced to the Final Four.

=== Softball ===
In 2007, their first year as a member in the Sun Belt Conference, the FAU women's softball team became Sun Belt Conference champions winning both the Sun Belt regular-season and the Sun Belt tournament title. Florida Atlantic University is only the second Sun Belt champion in league history, knocking off defending champions Louisiana-Lafayette, which had won the first seven Sun Belt titles. Additionally, the Lady Owls were only one of two teams to win their final post season game. Coach Joan Joyce was named the Sun Belt's Coach of the Year after guiding the Owls to the top of the conference. Prior to joining the Sun Belt Conference, FAU softball had won nine Atlantic Sun Conference titles in the previous 10 years.

=== Track and field ===
The FAU women's track and field team was founded in 2000. The men's team was scheduled to begin in 2001, but it didn't start. Bob Beamon was named as a coach of both teams.

== Non-varsity sports ==
=== Ice hockey ===
The Florida Atlantic University Ice Hockey Club competes in Division II of the American Collegiate Hockey Association (ACHA) and has been a member of the College Hockey South (CHS) conference since the 2019–2020 season. The Owls won the ACHA Division II national championship in 2025 and competed in the ACHA National Tournament in 2005 and 2011, also qualifying for the ACHA Regional Tournament in the 2017–2018 and 2019–2020 seasons. Open tryouts are held at the beginning of the fall semester to prepare for a season of over 25 multi-conference games, the CHS Playoffs, and the CHF Federation Cup.

== Rivalries ==
=== Florida International ===
The rivalry between Florida Atlantic and Florida International started in 2002 when FIU's newly formed football program signed on to an annual matchup with FAU, alternating between home fields; the game has come to be called the Shula Bowl. FAU leads the football series 16–4 as of 2022. On the basketball court, FAU leads the series 21–18 as of 2023.

== Facilities ==
Sport	Facility	Capacity
Football	FAU Stadium	29,571
Men's & Women's Basketball/Volleyball	Eleanor R. Baldwin Arena	3,161
Baseball	FAU Baseball Stadium	2,000
Softball	Joan Joyce Field	700
Soccer	FAU Soccer Stadium	1,000
Swimming and diving	FAU Aquatic Center	None listed
Beach volleyball	FAU Beach Volleyball Complex	None listed
Tennis	Kimberly V. Strauss Tennis Center	None listed
Cross country/Track and field	FAU Track and Field Complex	None listed
Golf		varies

== Traditions ==
Owlsley and Hoot are the official mascots of Florida Atlantic. FAU is one of three schools in the American Athletic Conference to use the owl as a mascot, alongside Temple University and Rice University.

Fight song: The Florida Atlantic University fight song was created in 2004, in response to the university's growing football program. FAU fielded its first marching band in the 2002 football season, collectively called the Florida Atlantic Marching Owls.

- A growing tradition at football and basketball games is a marching band rendition of the songs "Move Along" by The All-American Rejects, "Sugar, We're Goin' Down" by Fall Out Boy and "Time Warp" from the movie The Rocky Horror Picture Show.
- During a free-throw attempt by an Owl at home basketball games, the student section holds up both arms and makes owl fingers with their fingers (in the form of the traditional OK sign). When the shot is made, the students follow with: Stomp, stomp, clap, clap and yell F-A-U! This is quickly followed by a circular motion of the owl fingers of the right hand over the head to represent a flying owl.
- At the beginning and end of basketball games, a rap song titled "Represent FAU" is played. The song is rapped by a group that attended the university.
- Owl fans have traditionally worn red to support the athletics teams during rivalry games, made popular by the "Real Fans Wear Red" shirts and the "Bury the Burrow in Red" events (the Burrow is the nickname for Eleanor R. Baldwin Arena). Fans wear FAU Blue or FAU Red for non-rivalry games.

== Media ==
FAU Owls home and road games for football and basketball can be heard locally (the tri-county area of South Florida—Palm Beach, Broward, and Miami-Dade counties) on WMEN Fox Sports 640 AM South Florida (formerly known as "640 The Hurricane Sports Radio") on the radio, on the station's webstream, and thru their stream on the TuneIn application. The voice of Owls football is part-time ESPN 106.3 West Palm 's Ken LaVicka. All football and basketball games can be heard live on FAU's website, as well.

Occasional FAU football and, as of 2019, all FAU men's basketball games are broadcast by ESPN+, the streaming service from ESPN. Other networks that have broadcast FAU games in recent years include FOX, ESPNU, NFL Network, CBS Sports Network, Stadium, and ABC.

== Hall of Fame ==
For an alphabetical list of inductees, see footnote The Florida Atlantic University Athletic Hall of Fame inducted its inaugural class of members in 2006.

=== Notable Hall of Famers ===
- Steve Traylor (baseball, former head coach)
- Yolanda Griffith (women's basketball, F)
- Howard Schnellenberger (football, founding head coach)
- John McCormack (baseball, head coach)
- Brittany Bowe (women's basketball, PG)
- Joan Joyce (softball, head coach)
