= 2024 Florida Atlantic Owls baseball team =

Season of Florida Atlantic University baseball team

2024 Florida Atlantic Owls baseball
- Conference: American Athletic Conference
- Record: 28–29 (12–15 AAC)
- Head coach: John McCormack (16th season)
- Assistant coaches: Jordan Tabakman; Michael Cleary; Ricky Santiago
- Home stadium: FAU Baseball Stadium

2024 American Athletic Conference baseball standings
	Conf.				Overall
Team	W		L	PCT	W		L	PCT
No. 14 East Carolina ‍†‍‍^{y}	19	–	8	.704	43	–	15	.741
UTSA ‍‍‍	17	–	10	.630	32	–	24	.571
Tulane ‍‍‡‍^{y}	15	–	12	.556	35	–	24	.593
Wichita State ‍‍‍	15	–	12	.556	32	–	29	.525
UAB ‍‍‍	13	–	14	.481	26	–	29	.473
Florida Atlantic ‍‍‍	12	–	15	.444	28	–	29	.491
Charlotte ‍‍‍	12	–	15	.444	24	–	34	.414
Rice ‍‍‍	11	–	16	.407	23	–	36	.390
South Florida ‍‍‍	11	–	16	.407	26	–	29	.473
Memphis ‍‍‍	10	–	17	.370	23	–	32	.418
† – Conference champion ‡ – Tournament champion y – Invited to the NCAA tournament As of May 26, 2024; Rankings from D1Baseball

The 2024 Florida Atlantic Owls baseball team represented Florida Atlantic University in the sport of baseball during the 2024 college baseball season. This was the Owls' first season as members of the American Athletic Conference (AAC). Home games were played at FAU Baseball Stadium on the university's main campus in Boca Raton, Florida. The team was coached by John McCormack in his sixteenth season as Florida Atlantic's head coach.

== Preseason ==
=== AAC coaches poll ===
The American Athletic Conference preseason poll was released on December 28, 2023, with the Owls predicted to finish in fourth place.

Coaches Poll
Rank	School (1st Place Votes)	Total
1	East Carolina (9)	81
2	Charlotte	67
3	UTSA	64
4	Florida Atlantic	54
5	South Florida (1)	47
6	Memphis	35
7	Wichita State	34
8	Rice	29
9	Tulane	25
10	UAB	14

== Roster ==
2024 Florida Atlantic Owls baseball team
Players
Coaches

#	Pos.	Name	B/T	Height	Weight	Year	Home town
1	INF	Nick Garagozzo	L/R	5 ft 9 in (1.75 m)	175 lb (79 kg)	Jr	Mount Laurel, New Jersey
2	INF	Skyler Schulz	R/R	6 ft 0 in (1.83 m)	195 lb (88 kg)	Jr	Boynton Beach, Florida
4	INF	Joey Slattery	L/R	6 ft 0 in (1.83 m)	185 lb (84 kg)	Jr	Charlotte, North Carolina
5	OF	Jalen DeBose	R/R	6 ft 0 in (1.83 m)	160 lb (73 kg)	Sr	Sanford, Florida
6	C	Dylan LaPointe	R/R	6 ft 1 in (1.85 m)	205 lb (93 kg)	Fr	Valrico, Florida
7	RHP	C.J. Williams	R/R	5 ft 10 in (1.78 m)	180 lb (82 kg)	Sr	Deerfield Beach, Florida
8	LHP	Trey Beard	L/L	6 ft 2 in (1.88 m)	185 lb (84 kg)	Fr	Dunedin, Florida
9	OF	Spencer Rich	R/R	6 ft 2 in (1.88 m)	200 lb (91 kg)	Sr	Longmont, Colorado
10	C	John Schroeder	R/R	6 ft 1 in (1.85 m)	180 lb (82 kg)	Jr	Lakewood Ranch, Florida
11	INF	Patrick Ward	R/R	6 ft 3 in (1.91 m)	175 lb (79 kg)	So	Port St. Lucie, Florida
13	RHP	Steven Andrews	R/R	6 ft 3 in (1.91 m)	205 lb (93 kg)	Jr	Delray Beach, Florida
14	RHP	Tyler Murphy	R/R	6 ft 1 in (1.85 m)	180 lb (82 kg)	So	Palm City, Florida
15	INF	Brando Leroux	R/R	5 ft 7 in (1.7 m)	165 lb (75 kg)	Jr	Markham, Ontario, Canada
16	RHP	AJ Shelton	R/R	6 ft 1 in (1.85 m)	195 lb (88 kg)	Fr	Dunedin, Florida
17	RHP	Mark Loubier	L/R	6 ft 2 in (1.88 m)	170 lb (77 kg)	Fr	Winter Springs, Florida
18	LHP	Ben Gilbert	L/L	5 ft 11 in (1.8 m)	185 lb (84 kg)	Sr	Babson Park, Florida
19	INF	Christian Adams	L/R	6 ft 2 in (1.88 m)	205 lb (93 kg)	Sr	Royal Palm Beach, Florida
21	RHP	Danny Trehey	R/R	6 ft 4 in (1.93 m)	205 lb (93 kg)	Sr	Kansas City, Kansas
22	OF	Jake Millan	R/L	6 ft 2 in (1.88 m)	210 lb (95 kg)	Jr	Springbrook, Pennsylvania
23	RHP	Dawson Ball	L/R	6 ft 0 in (1.83 m)	195 lb (88 kg)	Jr	Wellington, Florida
24	INF	Mike La Rocca	L/L	6 ft 3 in (1.91 m)	225 lb (102 kg)	Sr	Vero Beach, Florida
25	RHP	Braden Ostrander	R/R	6 ft 1 in (1.85 m)	205 lb (93 kg)	Sr	Melbourne, Florida
26	INF	Emilio Gonzalez	L/L	6 ft 3 in (1.91 m)	230 lb (104 kg)	Fr	Cape Coral, Florida
27	RHP	David Alvarez	L/R	6 ft 2 in (1.88 m)	200 lb (91 kg)	Fr	Toronto, Ontario, Canada
28	INF	Daulton Frank (redshirt)	R/R	5 ft 11 in (1.8 m)	175 lb (79 kg)	Jr	Loxahatchee, Florida
29	RHP	Kyle Beaty	R/R	6 ft 0 in (1.83 m)	190 lb (86 kg)	Jr	Dacula, Georgia
30	C	Andrew McKenna	L/R	5 ft 11 in (1.8 m)	200 lb (91 kg)	Sr	Hinsdale, Illinois
33	RHP	Dylan Oborne	R/R	6 ft 3 in (1.91 m)	210 lb (95 kg)	So	Richmond Hill, Ontario, Canada
34	OF	Carter Brady	R/R	6 ft 1 in (1.85 m)	205 lb (93 kg)	Jr	Parkland, Florida
35	RHP	Bryan Boully	R/R	6 ft 2 in (1.88 m)	205 lb (93 kg)	Jr	Dover, Florida
36	C	Phoenix Medina	R/R	6 ft 0 in (1.83 m)	180 lb (82 kg)	Jr	Lawton, Oklahoma
37	RHP	Brandon Smith (redshirt)	S/R	6 ft 2 in (1.88 m)	210 lb (95 kg)	Sr	Woodstock, Georgia
40	RHP	Justin Gay	R/R	6 ft 7 in (2.01 m)	245 lb (111 kg)	Jr	Brooksville, Florida
42	LHP	Sam Drumheller	R/L	5 ft 9 in (1.75 m)	155 lb (70 kg)	Sr	Tampa, Florida
43	LHP	Max Martzolf	L/L	6 ft 1 in (1.85 m)	250 lb (113 kg)	Jr	Port St. Lucie, Florida
44	RHP	Nicholas Del Prado	R/R	6 ft 2 in (1.88 m)	235 lb (107 kg)	Sr	Miami, Florida
49	LHP	Kide Adetuyi	R/L	6 ft 1 in (1.85 m)	190 lb (86 kg)	Fr	Merritt Island, Florida
55	LHP	Zach Abbey	L/L	6 ft 5 in (1.96 m)	225 lb (102 kg)	Jr	Ypsilanti, Michigan

Head coach

John McCormack (Lynn)

Assistant coach(es)

Jordan Tabakman (UConn)
Michael Cleary (Dayton)
Ricky Santiago (Lander)

Legend

- (C) Team captain
- (S) Suspended
- (I) Ineligible
- Injured
- Current redshirt

Roster
Last update: 2 January 2024

== Schedule ==
Legend
	Florida Atlantic win
	Florida Atlantic loss
	Postponement
**Bold**	Florida Atlantic team member

2024 Florida Atlantic Owls Baseball Schedule
Regular season

February (4–4)
Date	Opponent	Stadium Site	Score	Win	Loss	Save	Attendance	Overall Record
February 16	at No. 6 Vanderbilt	Hawkins Field; Nashville, TN	**L** 11–12	JD Thompson (1–0)	**B. Ostrander** (0–1)	None	3,542	0–1
February 17	at No. 6 Vanderbilt	Hawkins Field	**W** 5–4	**B. Boully** (1–0)	M. Green (0–1)	None	3,383	1–1
February 18	at No. 6 Vanderbilt	Hawkins Field	**L** 1–11	D. Futrell (1–0)	**B. Smith** (0–1)	B. Seiber (1)	3,579	1–2
February 23	Towson	FAU Baseball Stadium; Boca Raton, FL	**W** 8–1	**C.J. Williams** (1–0)	N. Nabholz (0–1)	None	516	2–2
February 24	Towson	FAU Baseball Stadium	**W** 5–1	**T. Beard** (1–0)	B. Seils (0–2)	None	479	3–2
February 25	Towson	FAU Baseball Stadium	**W** 16–1	**T. Murphy** (1–0)	M. Simpson (0–2)	None	364	4–2
February 27	UCF	FAU Baseball Stadium	**L** 6–11	C. Boxrucker (1–0)	**B. Ostrander** (0–2)	None	522	4–3
February 28	North Florida	FAU Baseball Stadium	**L** 6–8	Z. Starling (1–0)	**D. Ball** (0–1)	L. Bolton (1)	305	4–4

March (12–5)
Date	Opponent	Stadium Site	Score	Win	Loss	Save	Attendance	Overall Record	AAC Record
March 1	Stonehill	FAU Baseball Stadium	**W** 6–0	**C.J. Williams** (2–0)	R. Douglas (0–2)	None	376	5–4	–
March 2	Stonehill	FAU Baseball Stadium	**L** 2–3	Z. Gleason (1–0)	**T. Beard** (1–1)	J. Castrichini (2)	400	5–5	–
March 3	Stonehill	FAU Baseball Stadium	**W** 20–7	**S. Andrews** (1–0)	P. Haas (0–2)	None	342	6–5	–
March 8	FIU	FAU Baseball Stadium	**W** 4–1	**C.J. Williams** (3–0)	L. Runde (1–2)	**B. Ostrander** (1)	352	7–5	–
March 9	at FIU	Infinity Insurance Park; Westchester, FL	**L** 4–7	R. Cabarcas (2–0)	**K. Beaty** (0–1)	None	641	7–6	–
March 10	FIU	FAU Baseball Stadium	**W** 24–2	**T. Murphy** (2–0)	J. Pineiro (2–1)	None	360	8–6	–
March 12	Miami (FL)	FAU Baseball Stadium	**W** 6–4	**D. Trehey** (1–0)	A. Crowther (0–2)	**B. Ostrander** (2)	869	9–6	–
March 15	Maine	FAU Baseball Stadium	**W** 15–2	**C.J. Williams** (4–0)	G. Gambardella (0–4)	None	392	10–6	–
March 16	Maine	FAU Baseball Stadium	**W** 6–4	**B. Smith** (1–1)	L. Lavigueur (0–2)	None	512	11–6	–
March 17	Maine	FAU Baseball Stadium	**W** 10–0^{7}	**T. Murphy** (3–0)	G. Gifford (0–1)	None	343	12–6	–
March 19	at UCF	John Euliano Park; Orlando, FL	**L** 3–2	C. Centala (3–0)	**D. Trehey** (1–1)	None	1,811	12–7	–
March 23	Charlotte	FAU Baseball Stadium	**W** 4–3	**S. Andrews** (2–0)	C. Reynolds (3–2)	**D. Trehey** (1)	372	13–7	1–0
March 23	Charlotte	FAU Baseball Stadium	**W** 6–5^{10}	**M. Martzolf** (1–0)	AJ Wilson (1–1)	None	359	14–7	2–0
March 24	Charlotte	FAU Baseball Stadium	**L** 1–13^{8}	C. Carson (1–0)	**T. Beard** (1–2)	None	403	14–8	2–1
March 28	at Memphis	FedExPark; Memphis, TN	**L** 1–2	D. Warren (4–1)	**C.J. Williams** (4–1)	B. Sanders (6)	634	14–9	2–2
March 29	at Memphis	FedExPark	**W** 13–5	**M. Martzolf** (2–0)	L. Ellis (0–4)	None	561	15–9	3–2
March 30	at Memphis	FedExPark	**W** 14–3	**T. Beard** (2–2)	C. Robinson (1–3)	None	652	16–9	4–2

April (6–11)
Date	Opponent	Stadium Site	Score	Win	Loss	Save	Attendance	Overall Record	AAC Record
April 2	Miami (FL)	FAU Baseball Stadium	**W** 6–4	**B. Smith** (2–1)	A. Crowther (0–3)	**D. Trehey** (2)	574	17–9	–
April 5	No. 12 East Carolina	FAU Baseball Stadium	**L** 1–4	T. Yesavage (6–1)	**C.J. Williams** (4–2)	W. Lunsford-Shenkman (3)	919	17–10	4–3
April 6	No. 12 East Carolina	FAU Baseball Stadium	**W** 6–5	**D. Trehey** (2–1)	D. Beal (3–2)	None	533	18–10	5–3
April 7	No. 12 East Carolina	FAU Baseball Stadium	**L** 6–11	J. Hunter (2–2)	**B. Ostrander** (0–3)	W. Lunsford-Shenkman (4)	448	18–11	5–4
April 9	at Miami (FL)	Alex Rodriguez Park; Coral Gables, FL	**L** 6–14	A. Crowther (1–4)	**B. Smith** (2–2)	None	2,371	18–12	–
April 12	at Wichita State	Eck Stadium; Wichita, KS	**W** 4–2	**S. Andrews** (3–0)	C. Favors (5–3)	**D. Trehey** (3)	1,808	19–12	6–4
April 13	at Wichita State	Eck Stadium	**L** 9–14	J. Mount (1–0)	**D. Trehey** (2–2)	None	1,588	19–13	6–5
April 14	at Wichita State	Eck Stadium	**L** 5–10^{8}	T. Dobbs (5–3)	**T. Beard** (2–3)	H. Holmes (1)	1,671	19–14	6–6
April 16	at FIU	Infinity Insurance Park	**L** 0–1	J. Ritchey (2–1)	**D. Ball** (0–2)	Z. Lampton (2)	629	19–15	–
April 19	Tulane	FAU Baseball Stadium	**W** 5–0	**C.J. Williams** (5–2)	L. Fladda (1–3)	None	467	20–15	7–6
April 20	Tulane	FAU Baseball Stadium	**L** 3–8	C. Welch (5–1)	**T. Murphy** (3–1)	None	395	20–16	7–7
April 21	Tulane	FAU Baseball Stadium	**L** 5–9	H. Shuffler (4–0)	**S. Andrews** (3–1)	None	352	20–17	7–8
April 23	at Miami (FL)	Alex Rodriguez Park	**L** 2–5	J. Vargas (1–0)	**B. Ostrander** (0–4)	N. Robert (3)	2,264	20–18	–
April 26	at South Florida	USF Baseball Stadium; Tampa, FL	**W** 3–2	**S. Drumheller** (1–0)	J. Cebert (4–5)	**D. Trehey** (4)	1,336	21–18	8–8
April 27	at South Florida	USF Baseball Stadium	**L** 5–8	D. Madonna (2–1)	**T. Murphy** (3–2)	None	1,138	21–19	8–9
April 28	at South Florida	USF Baseball Stadium	**W** 6–3	**S. Andrews** (4–1)	J. Cebert (4–6)	**D. Trehey** (5)	1,364	22–19	9–9
April 30	Florida	Condron Ballpark; Gainesville, FL	**L** 8–10	R. Slater (4–2)	**D. Ball** (0–3)	None	4,790	22–20	–

May (4–7)
Date	Opponent	Stadium Site	Score	Win	Loss	Save	Attendance	Overall Record	AAC Record
May 3	UAB	FAU Baseball Stadium	**L** 1–12	B. Berry (7–2)	**C.J. Williams** (5–3)	None	328	22–21	9–10
May 4	UAB	FAU Baseball Stadium	**L** 0–15	B. Shelton (2–5)	**B. Smith** (2–3)	None	351	22–22	9–11
May 5	UAB	FAU Baseball Stadium	**W** 6–5	**S. Drumheller** (2–0)	B. Hill (0–2)	None	337	23–22	10–11
May 7	Florida Gulf Coast	FAU Baseball Stadium	**W** 9–6	**D. Trehey** (3–2)	A. Valiente (1–1)	None	308	24–22	–
May 10	at Rice	Reckling Park; Houston, TX	**L** 4–5	D. Hickson (3–0)	**S. Andrews** (4–2)	None	2,547	24–23	10–12
May 11^{1}	at Rice	Reckling Park	**W** 14–3	**T. Beard** (3–3)	J.D. McCracken (1–3)	**D. Trehey** (6)	2,173	25–23	11–12
May 11^{2}	at Rice	Reckling Park	**L** 4–5	T. Alch (1–3)	**B. Smith** (2–4)	G. Stratton (2)	2,134	25–24	11–13
May 14	at Florida Gulf Coast	Swanson Stadium; Fort Myers, FL	**L** 18–28	D. Crum (1–2)	**D. Ball** (0–4)	None	142	25–25	–
May 16	UTSA	FAU Baseball Stadium	**L** 1–14	U. Quiroga (8–1)	**C.J. Williams** (5–4)	None	366	25–26	11–14
May 17	UTSA	FAU Baseball Stadium	**L** 2–3^{10}	R. Riojas (10–3)	**D. Trehey** (3–3)	None	420	25–27	11–15
May 18	UTSA	FAU Baseball Stadium	**W** 6–4	**S. Andrews** (5–2)	R. Orloski (3–5)	**D. Trehey** (7)	384	26–27	12–15

Post-Season

AAC Tournament (2–2)
Date	Opponent	Seed	Site/stadium	Score	Win	Loss	Save	TV	Attendance	Overall record	Tournament Record
May 21	vs. (3) Tulane	6	BayCare Ballpark; Clearwater, FL	**L** 2–14^{7}	C. Welch (7–3)	**C.J. Williams** (5–5)	None	ESPN+		26–28	0–1
May 22	vs. (2) UTSA	6	BayCare Ballpark	**W** 12–5	**T. Beard** (4–3)	U. Quiroga (8–2)	None	ESPN+	743	27–28	1–1
May 24	vs. (7) Charlotte	6	BayCare Ballpark	**W** 10–8	**S. Drumheller** (3–0)	C. Carson (2–2)	**D. Trehey** (8)	ESPN+	862	28–28	2–1
May 25	vs. (3) Tulane	6	BayCare Ballpark	**L** 1–13^{7}	B. Price (3–2)	**T. Beard** (4–4)	None	ESPN+		28–29	2–2

Schedule source:

*Rankings are based on the team's current ranking in the D1Baseball poll.
