= 2020 Charlotte 49ers baseball team =

American college baseball season

2020 Charlotte 49ers baseball
- Conference: Conference USA
- Record: 5-3 (0-0 C-USA)
- Head coach: Robert Woodard (1st year)
- Assistant coach: Bo Robinson (8th year); Toby Bicknell (1st year); John Stott (1st year)
- Home stadium: Robert and Mariam Hayes Stadium

2020 Conference USA baseball standings
	Conf.						Overall
Team	W		L		T	PCT	W		L		T	PCT
Old Dominion ‍‍‍	0	–	0	–	0	–	12	–	4	–	0	.750
Southern Miss ‍‍‍	0	–	0	–	0	–	12	–	4	–	0	.750
FIU ‍‍‍	0	–	0	–	0	–	10	–	5	–	0	.667
Louisiana Tech ‍‍‍	0	–	0	–	0	–	11	–	6	–	0	.647
Florida Atlantic ‍‍‍	0	–	0	–	0	–	10	–	6	–	0	.625
Western Kentucky ‍‍‍	0	–	0	–	0	–	10	–	6	–	0	.625
UTSA ‍‍‍	0	–	0	–	0	–	10	–	7	–	0	.588
Charlotte ‍‍‍	0	–	0	–	0	–	9	–	8	–	0	.529
UAB ‍‍‍	0	–	0	–	0	–	7	–	9	–	0	.438
Middle Tennessee ‍‍‍	0	–	0	–	0	–	7	–	10	–	0	.412
Marshall ‍‍‍	0	–	0	–	0	–	4	–	10	–	1	.300
Rice ‍‍‍	0	–	0	–	0	–	2	–	14	–	0	.125
x – Division champion † – Conference champion ‡ – Tournament champion y – Invited to the NCAA tournament As of March 16, 2020; Rankings from D1Baseball

The 2020 Charlotte 49ers baseball team represented the University of North Carolina at Charlotte in the sport of baseball during the 2020 college baseball season. Charlotte competed in Conference USA (C-USA). Home games were played at Robert and Mariam Hayes Stadium on the university's Charlotte, North Carolina campus. The team was coached by Robert Woodard in his first season as the 49ers' head coach.

== Preseason ==
=== C-USA Preseason poll ===
The Conference USA Preseason Poll was released on January 29, 2020, as selected by the conference's head coaches. Charlotte was selected eleventh in order of finish for the season.

Predicted order of finish
Predicted finish	Team	1st place votes
1	Southern Miss	6
2	Florida Atlantic	4
3	Louisiana Tech	
4	Old Dominion	
5	Rice	1
6	FIU	1
7	WKU	
8	UAB	
9	UTSA	
10	Marshall	
11	Charlotte	
12	Middle Tennessee	

== Schedule ==
2020 Charlotte 49ers baseball game log
Regular season

February
Date	Opponent	Rank	Stadium Site	Score	Win	Loss	Save	Attendance	Overall Record	C-USA Record
February 14	VCU		Hayes Stadium; Charlotte, NC	**L** 5-17	E. Chenier (1–0)	**B. McGowan** (0–1)	E. Serrano (1)	812	0-1	–
February 15	VCU		Hayes Stadium	**W** 5-4 (11)	**T. Starnes** (1–0)	C. Knapek (0–1)	None	887	1-1	–
February 16	VCU		Hayes Stadium	**L** 4-8	M. Furman (1-0)	**A. Roach** (0–1)	None	682	1-2	–
February 18	at Tennessee		Lindsey Nelson Stadium; Knoxville, TN	**L** 2-8	E. Pleasants (1-0)	**T. Starnes** (1–1)	None	983	1-3	–
February 21	UMBC		Hayes Stadium	**W** 4-0	**B. McGowan** (1-1)	R. Celata (0-1)	**P. Szczypinski** (1)	527	2-3	–
February 22	UMBC		Hayes Stadium	**W** 6-1	**R. Czanstkowski** (1-0)	K. Garner (0-1)	None	-	3-3	–
February 22	UMBC		Hayes Stadium	**W** 4-0	**A. Roach** (1-1)	J. Nestel (0-1)	**C. Bruce** (1)	793	4-3	–
February 23	UMBC		Hayes Stadium	**W** 11-6	**J. Boss** (1-0)	M. Goron (0-1)	**N. Turnbull** (1)	649	5-3	–
February 25	at UNCG		UNCG Baseball Stadium; Greensboro, NC		Time: 4:00 p.m. Radio: C-USA.tv				–	–
February 28	St. John's		Hayes Stadium	**W** 11-6	**B. McGowan** (2-1)	N. Mondak (0-2)	**C. Bruce** (2)	532	6-4	–
February 29	St. John's		Hayes Stadium	**W** 11-6	**J. Boss** (2-0)	E. Routzahn (0-1)	None	581	7-4	–

March
Date	Opponent	Rank	Stadium Site	Score	Win	Loss	Save	Attendance	Overall Record	C-USA Record
March 1	St. John's		Hayes Stadium		Time: 12:00 p.m.				–	–
March 3	at Coastal Carolina		Springs Brooks Stadium; Conway, SC		Time: 4:00 p.m. Radio: CUSA.tv				–	–
March 6	East Carolina		Hayes Stadium		Time: 6:00 p.m. TV: CUSA.tv				–	–
March 7	East Carolina		Hayes Stadium		Time: 3:00 p.m.				–	–
March 8	East Carolina		Hayes Stadium		Time: 12:00 p.m. TV: CUSA.tv				–	–
March 10	at NC State		Doak Field; Raleigh, NC		Time: 6:00 p.m.				–	–
March 13	at UTSA		Roadrunner Field; San Antonio, TX		Time: 7:30 p.m. TV: CUSA.tv				–	–
March 14	at UTSA		Roadrunner Field		Time: 3:00 p.m. TV: CUSA.tv				–	–
March 15	at UTSA		Roadrunner Field		Time: 12:30 p.m. TV: CUSA.tv				–	–
March 17	vs. Wake Forest		BB&T Ballpark; Charlotte, NC		Time: 7:05 p.m. TV: CUSA.tv				–	–
March 20	Old Dominion		Hayes Stadium		Time: 6:00 p.m. TV: CUSA.tv				–	–
March 21	Old Dominion		Hayes Stadium		Time: 6:00 p.m. TV: CUSA.tv				–	–
March 22	Old Dominion		Hayes Stadium		Time: 12:00 p.m. TV: CUSA.tv				–	–
March 24	vs. NC State		BB&T Ballpark		Time: 7:05 p.m. TV: CUSA.tv				–	–
March 27	at Rice		Reckling Park; Houston, TX		Time: 7:30 p.m. TV: CUSA.tv				–	–
March 28	at Rice		Reckling Park		Time: 3:00 p.m. TV: CUSA.tv				–	–
March 29	at Rice		Reckling Park		Time: 1:00 p.m. TV: CUSA.tv				–	–
March 31	Coastal Carolina		Hayes Stadium		Time: 6:00 p.m. TV: CUSA.tv				–	–

April
Date	Opponent	Rank	Stadium Site	Score	Win	Loss	Save	Attendance	Overall Record	C-USA Record
April 1	UNC Asheville		Hayes Stadium		Time: 6:00 p.m.				–	–
April 3	UAB		Hayes Stadium		Time: 6:00 p.m. TV: CUSA.tv				–	–
April 4	UAB		Hayes Stadium		Time: 3:00 p.m. TV: CUSA.tv				–	–
April 5	UAB		Hayes Stadium		Time: 3:00 p.m. TV: CUSA.tv				–	–
April 7	Winthrop		Hayes Stadium		Time: 6:00 p.m.				–	–
April 10	at Marshall		Kennedy Center Field; Huntington, WV		Time: 3:00 p.m. Radio: CUSA.tv				–	–
April 11	at Marshall		Kennedy Center Field		Time: 2:00 p.m. Radio: CUSA.tv				–	–
April 12	at Marshall		Kennedy Center Field		Time: 1:00 p.m. Radio: CUSA.tv				–	–
April 14	at Wake Forest		David F. Couch Ballpark; Winston-Salem, NC		Time: 6:00 p.m. Radio: CUSA.tv				-	-
April 17	Southern Miss		Hayes Stadium		Time: 6:00 p.m. TV: CUSA.tv				–	–
April 18	Southern Miss		Hayes Stadium		Time: 3:00 p.m. TV: CUSA.tv				–	–
April 19	Southern Miss		Hayes Stadium		Time: 12:00 p.m. TV: CUSA.tv				–	–
April 21	UNCG		Hayes Stadium		Time: 6:00 p.m.				–	–
April 24	at Middle Tennessee		Reese Smith Jr. Field; Murfreesboro, TN		Time:7:00 p.m. Radio: CUSA.tv				–	–
April 25	at Middle Tennessee		Reese Smith Jr. Field		Time: 4:00 p.m. Radio: CUSA.tv				–	–
April 26	at Middle Tennessee		Reese Smith Jr. Field		Time: 1:00 p.m. Radio: CUSA.tv				–	–
April 28	at Winthrop		Winthrop Ballpark; Rock Hill, SC		Time: 6:00 p.m. Radio: CUSA.tv				–	–

May
Date	Opponent	Rank	Stadium Site	Score	Win	Loss	Save	Attendance	Overall Record	C-USA Record
May 1	FIU		Hayes Stadium		Time: 6:00 p.m. TV: CUSA.tv				–	–
May 2	FIU		Hayes Stadium		Time: 3:00 p.m. TV: CUSA.tv				–	–
May 3	FIU		Hayes Stadium		Time: 12:00 p.m. TV: CUSA.tv				–	–
May 8	WKU		Hayes Stadium		Time: 6:00 p.m. TV: CUSA.tv				–	–
May 9	WKU		Hayes Stadium		Time: 3:00 p.m. TV: CUSA.tv				–	–
May 10	WKU		Hayes Stadium		Time: 12:00 p.m. TV: CUSA.tv				–	–
May 15	at Florida Atlantic		FAU Baseball Stadium; Boca Raton, FL		Time:6:30 p.m. Radio: CUSA.tv				–	–
May 16	at Florida Atlantic		FAU Baseball Stadium		Time: 6:30 p.m. Radio: CUSA.tv				–	–
May 17	at Florida Atlantic		FAU Baseball Stadium		Time: 12:00 p.m. Radio: CUSA.tv				–	–

Legend: = Win = Loss = Cancelled
Bold = Charlotte team member

== Roster ==
2020 Charlotte 49ers roster
Pitchers: 19 - Bryce McGowan - Sophomore; 21 - Colby Bruce - Senior; 25 - Patrick Szczypinski - Junior; 26 - Chase Covington - Junior; 27 - Christian Lothes - Freshman; 28 - Justin Offschanka - Sophomore; 29 - Nick Turnbull - Senior; 30 - Trae Starnes - Junior; 33 - Ethan Earhart - (redshirt) Junior; 34 - Ryan Czanstkowski - Senior; 35 - Will Palinkas - Sophomore; 37 - Andrew Roach - Junior; 38 - Jackson Boss - Sophomore; 39 - Spencer Ard - Senior; 41 - Matt Brooks - (redshirt) Junior	Catchers: 3 - Carter Foster - Sophomore; 9 - Craig Kuechel - Junior; 44 - Jacob Whitley - (redshirt) Junior; Infielders: 2 - Carson Johnson - Senior; 6 - Josh Haney - Sophomore; 10 - Tate Pennington - Junior; 14 - Vito Patierno - Freshman; 16 - Zach Weston - Freshman; 24 - David McCabe - Freshman; 36 - Rafi Vazquez - Senior; 55 - Nate Kinsch - Junior	Outfielders: 1 - Jake Whitcomb - Junior; 11 - Patrick Wheeler - Senior; 12 - Riley Cheek - Sophomore; 17 - Todd Elwood - Senior; 22 - Dominic Pilolli - Freshman; 43 - Riley Zayicek - Graduate Student

== Coaching staff ==
Coaching Staff
- Robert Woodard - Head Coach - 1st year
- Bo Robinson - Associate Head Coach - 1st year
- Toby Bicknell - Assistant Coach - 1st year
- John Stott - Assistant Coach - 1st year
- Tyler Simmons - Director of Player Development - 1st year
