= 2007 Louisiana–Lafayette Ragin' Cajuns baseball team =

American college baseball season

2007 Louisiana–Lafayette Ragin' Cajuns baseball

Sun Belt Regular season Champions College Station Regionals Appearance
- Conference: Sun Belt Conference
- Record: 45–17 (23–7 SBC)
- Head coach: Tony Robichaux (13th season)
- Assistant coach: Anthony Babineaux
- Home stadium: M. L. Tigue Moore Field

2007 Sun Belt Conference baseball standings
	Conf.				Overall
Team	W		L	PCT	W		L	PCT
Louisiana–Lafayette ‍†‍‍^{y}	23	–	7	.767	45	–	17	.726
New Orleans ‍‍‡‍^{y}	16	–	14	.533	38	–	26	.594
Middle Tennessee ‍‍‍	16	–	14	.533	32	–	28	.533
Troy ‍‍‍^{y}	16	–	14	.533	34	–	27	.557
Louisiana–Monroe ‍‍‍	15	–	14	.517	29	–	28	.509
Florida Atlantic ‍‍‍	15	–	15	.500	36	–	22	.621
Western Kentucky ‍‍‍	15	–	15	.500	17	–	30	.362
South Alabama ‍‍‍	13	–	16	.448	31	–	26	.544
Arkansas State ‍‍‍	13	–	17	.433	23	–	32	.418
FIU ‍‍‍	12	–	17	.414	26	–	29	.473
Arkansas–Little Rock ‍‍‍	9	–	20	.310	21	–	31	.404
† – Conference champion ‡ – Tournament champion y – Invited to the NCAA tournament As of June 30, 2007; Rankings from Collegiate Baseball

The 2007 Louisiana–Lafayette Ragin' Cajuns baseball team represented the University of Louisiana at Lafayette in the 2007 NCAA Division I baseball season. The Ragin' Cajuns played their home games at M. L. Tigue Moore Field and were led by thirteenth year head coach Tony Robichaux.

== Roster ==
2007 Louisiana–Lafayette Ragin' Cajuns roster
Pitchers: 7 Greg Wilborn – Sophomore; 15 Justin Robichaux – Redshirt Freshman; 17 T. J. Gros – Junior; 18 Hunter Moody – Junior; 19 Gregory Harmon – Sophomore; 20 Chase Richard – Redshirt Freshman; 23 Steven Schroeder – Redshirt Freshman; 24 Corey Chapman – Junior; 25 Andrew Laughter – Senior; 27 Danny Farquhar – Sophomore; 28 Randall Bulliard – Redshirt Freshman; 29 Buddy Glass – Junior; 30 Kyle Mickles – Senior; 34 John Zorich – Junior; 37 Brent Solich – Junior; 40 Matt Pilgreen – Senior; Dane Maxwell – Redshirt Freshman	Catchers: 6 Dillon Guillory – Redshirt Freshman; 11 Scott Hawkins – Sophomore; 21 Jonathan Lucroy – Junior; 22 Blaine Lafleur – Sophomore; Michael Petitto – Redshirt Freshman; Infielders: 1 Xavier Alexander – Junior; 2 Matt Hicks – Sophomore; 8 Devon Bourque – Senior; 9 Tim Santiago – Senior; 26 William Long – Redshirt Freshman; 31 Cy Primeaux – Junior; 32 Michael Levi – Junior; 33 Devery Van de Keere – Senior; 35 Grant Derouen – Sophomore; Outfielders: 4 Josh Logan – Junior; 5 Dustin Miller – Redshirt Freshman; 10 Nolan Gisclair – Junior; 12 Matt Casbon – Senior; 13 Jefferies Tatford – Senior; 39 Kolin Hatifield – Junior; Gabe Begneaud – Redshirt Freshman; Travis Whipple – Redshirt Freshman

=== Coaching staff ===
2007 Louisiana–Lafayette Ragin' Cajuns coaching staff
- Tony Robichaux – Head coach – 13th year
- Anthony Babineaux – Associate head coach – 13th year
- Chris Domingue – Director of Baseball Operations – 5th year

== Schedule and results ==
Legend
	Louisiana–Lafayette win
	Louisiana–Lafayette loss
	Postponement
**Bold**	Louisiana-Lafayette team member

2007 Louisiana–Lafayette Ragin' Cajuns baseball game log
Regular season (40–14)
February (10–0)

Date	Opponent	Ranking	Site/stadium	Score	TV	Overall record	SBC record
Feb. 13	Nicholls State		M. L. Tigue Moore Field • Lafayette, LA	**W** 15–7		1–0	
Feb. 16	at UTSA		Roadrunner Field • San Antonio, TX	**W** 10–2		2–0	
Feb. 17	at UTSA		Roadrunner Field • San Antonio, TX	**W** 5–2		3–0	
Feb. 18	at UTSA		Roadrunner Field • San Antonio, TX	**W** 14–2		4–0	
Feb. 21	at Southeastern Louisiana		Pat Kenelly Diamond at Alumni Field • Hammond, LA	**W** 5–1		5–0	
Feb. 23	Illinois		M. L. Tigue Moore Field • Lafayette, LA	**W** 13–5		6–0	
Feb. 24	Illinois		M. L. Tigue Moore Field • Lafayette, LA	**W** 7–6		7–0	
Feb. 25	Illinois		M. L. Tigue Moore Field • Lafayette, LA	**W** 10–7		8–0	
Feb. 27	Louisiana Tech		M. L. Tigue Moore Field • Lafayette, LA	**W** 5–1		9–0	
Feb. 28	Northwestern State		M. L. Tigue Moore Field • Lafayette, LA	**W** 10–5		10–0	

March (13–5)

Date	Opponent	Ranking	Site/stadium	Score	TV	Overall record	SBC record
Mar. 2	at Southern Miss		Pete Taylor Park • Hattiesburg, MS	**L** 4–7		10–1	
Mar. 3	at Southern Miss		Pete Taylor Park • Hattiesburg, MS	**W** 4–0		11–1	
Mar. 4	at Southern Miss		Pete Taylor Park • Hattiesburg, MS	**L** 0–1		11–2	
Mar. 6	at Northwestern State		H. Alvin Brown–C. C. Stroud Field • Natchitoches, LA	**L** 1–2		11–3	
Mar. 9	South Alabama		M. L. Tigue Moore Field • Lafayette, LA	**W** 7–2		12–3	1–0
Mar. 10	South Alabama		M. L. Tigue Moore Field • Lafayette, LA	**W** 9–6		13–3	2–0
Mar. 11	South Alabama		M. L. Tigue Moore Field • Lafayette, LA	**W** 10–6		14–3	3–0
Mar. 16	at Middle Tennessee		Reese Smith Jr. Field • Murfreesboro, TN	**W** 6–3		15–3	4–0
Mar. 17	at Middle Tennessee		Reese Smith Jr. Field • Murfreesboro, TN	**L** 6–12		15–4	4–1
Mar. 18	at Middle Tennessee		Reese Smith Jr. Field • Murfreesboro, TN	**L** 1–3		15–5	4–2
Mar. 20	McNeese State		M. L. Tigue Moore Field • Lafayette, LA	**W** 9–5		16–5	
Mar. 21	at McNeese State		Joe Miller Ballpark • Lake Charles, LA	**W** 9–5		17–5	
Mar. 23	Florida Atlantic		M. L. Tigue Moore Field • Lafayette, LA	**W** 5–2		18–5	5–2
Mar. 24	Florida Atlantic		M. L. Tigue Moore Field • Lafayette, LA	**W** 5–2		19–5	6–2
Mar. 25	Florida Atlantic		M. L. Tigue Moore Field • Lafayette, LA	**W** 3–2		20–5	7–2
Mar. 27	at Louisiana Tech		J. C. Love Field at Pat Patterson Park • Ruston, LA	**W** 11–6		21–5	
Mar. 30	at FIU	No. 28	FIU Baseball Stadium • Miami, FL	**W** 10–3		22–5	8–2
Mar. 31	at FIU	No. 28	FIU Baseball Stadium • Miami, FL	**W** 19–5		23–5	9–2

April (9–8)

Date	Opponent	Ranking	Site/stadium	Score	TV	Overall record	SBC record
Apr. 1	at FIU	No. 28	FIU Baseball Stadium • Miami, FL	**L** 13–14		23–6	9–3
Apr. 3	Lamar	No. 30	M. L. Tigue Moore Field • Lafayette, LA	**W** 5–3		24–6	
Apr. 6	Western Kentucky	No. 30	M. L. Tigue Moore Field • Lafayette, LA	**W** 8–2		25–6	10–3
Apr. 7	Western Kentucky	No. 30	M. L. Tigue Moore Field • Lafayette, LA	**L** 5–6		25–7	10–4
Apr. 7	Western Kentucky	No. 30	M. L. Tigue Moore Field • Lafayette, LA	**W** 10–6		26–7	11–4
Apr. 11	at Tulane	No. 30	Turchin Stadium • New Orleans, LA	**L** 4–5		26–8	
Apr. 13	at Troy	No. 30	Riddle–Pace Field • Troy, AL	**W** 13–3		27–8	12–4
Apr. 14	at Troy	No. 30	Riddle–Pace Field • Troy, AL	**W** 4–3		28–8	13–4
Apr. 15	at Troy	No. 30	Riddle–Pace Field • Troy, AL	**L** 4–14		28–9	13–5
Apr. 17	Southeastern Louisiana		M. L. Tigue Moore Field • Lafayette, LA	**W** 8–2		29–9	
Apr. 20	at No. 9 Arizona State		Packard Stadium • Tempe, AZ	**L** 2–8		29–10	
Apr. 21	at No. 9 Arizona State		Packard Stadium • Tempe, AZ	**L** 8–11		29–11	
Apr. 22	at No. 9 Arizona State		Packard Stadium • Tempe, AZ	**L** 6–9		29–12	
Apr. 24	at Lamar		Vincent–Beck Stadium • Beaumont, TX	**W** 3–1		30–12	
Apr. 27	Arkansas State		M. L. Tigue Moore Field • Lafayette, LA	**W** 6–5		31–12	14–5
Apr. 28	Arkansas State		M. L. Tigue Moore Field • Lafayette, LA	**W** 11–7		32–12	15–5
Apr. 29	Arkansas State		M. L. Tigue Moore Field • Lafayette, LA	**L** 2–4		32–13	15–6

May (8–1)

Date	Opponent	Ranking	Site/stadium	Score	TV	Overall record	SBC record
May 4	at Louisiana–Monroe		Warhawk Field • Monroe, LA	**W** 5–2		33–13	16–6
May 5	at Louisiana–Monroe		Warhawk Field • Monroe, LA	**W** 6–5		34–13	17–6
May 6	at Louisiana–Monroe		Warhawk Field • Monroe, LA	**W** 11–9		35–13	18–6
May 11	Arkansas–Little Rock		M. L. Tigue Moore Field • Lafayette, LA	**W** 13–3		36–13	19–6
May 12	Arkansas–Little Rock		M. L. Tigue Moore Field • Lafayette, LA	**W** 28–3		37–13	20–6
May 13	Arkansas–Little Rock		M. L. Tigue Moore Field • Lafayette, LA	**W** 9–5		38–13	21–6
May 15	at Nicholls		Ray E. Didier Field • Thibodaux, LA	Game cancelled			
May 17	at New Orleans		Privateer Park • New Orleans, LA	**W** 5–4		39–13	22–6
May 18	at New Orleans		Privateer Park • New Orleans, LA	**W** 3–1		40–13	23–6
May 19	at New Orleans		Privateer Park • New Orleans, LA	**L** 3–9		40–14	23–7

Postseason (5–3)
SBC Tournament (3–1)

Date	Opponent	Ranking	Site/stadium	Score	TV	Overall record	SBC record
May 23	vs. South Alabama	No. 22	Eddie Stanky Field • Mobile, AL	**W** 3–2		41–14	
May 24	vs. Troy	No. 22	Eddie Stanky Field • Mobile, AL	**W** 9–7		42–14	
May 25	vs. South Alabama	No. 22	Eddie Stanky Field • Mobile, AL	**W** 5–0		43–14	
May 26	vs. New Orleans	No. 22	Eddie Stanky Field • Mobile, AL	**L** 2–8		43–15	

NCAA Division I Baseball Championship (2-2)

Date	Opponent	Ranking	Site/stadium	Score	TV	Overall record	SBC record
College Station Regionals
Jun. 1	vs. Ohio State	No. 21	Olsen Field • College Station, TX	**W** 5–4		44–15	
Jun. 2	at No. 19 Texas A&M	No. 21	Olsen Field • College Station, TX	**W** 5–4		45–15	
Jun. 3	at No. 19 Texas A&M	No. 21	Olsen Field • College Station, TX	**L** 1–4		45–16	
Jun. 4	at No. 19 Texas A&M	No. 21	Olsen Field • College Station, TX	**L** 2–5		45–17	

Schedule Source:
Rankings are based on the team's current ranking in the Collegiate Baseball poll.

== College Station Regional ==
College Station Regional Teams
(1) Texas A&M Aggies	(2) Louisiana–Lafayette Ragin' Cajuns	(3) Ohio State Buckeyes	(4) Le Moyne Dolphins

First Round
1	Texas A&M	7
4	Le Moyne	2
3	Ohio State	4
2	Louisiana–Lafayette	5
Lower round 1
4	Le Moyne 5	5
3	Ohio State	19^{10}

Semi-Finals
1	Texas A&M	4
2	Louisiana–Lafayette	5
Lower final
3	Ohio State	4
1	Texas A&M	10

Finals
2	Louisiana–Lafayette
1	Texas A&M
