= Tommy Murphy (baseball) =

American baseball player

- Outfielder
- Born: August 27, 1979 (age 46); Suffern, New York, U.S.
- Batted: Switch Threw: Right

MLB debut
- May 4, 2006, for the Los Angeles Angels of Anaheim

Last MLB appearance
- September 30, 2007, for the Los Angeles Angels of Anaheim

MLB statistics
- Batting average: .213
- Home runs: 1
- Runs batted in: 8
- Stats at Baseball Reference

Teams
- Los Angeles Angels of Anaheim (2006–2007)

Thomas Christian Murphy (born August 27, 1979) is an American former Major League Baseball outfielder. He played for the Los Angeles Angels of Anaheim in 2006 and 2007.

== Career ==
Murphy was a 1997 graduate of Charlotte High School in Punta Gorda, Florida. He is also an alumnus of Florida Atlantic University, where he played baseball for the Owls under head coach Kevin Cooney. In 1999, he played collegiate summer baseball with the Wareham Gatemen of the Cape Cod Baseball League.

Murphy was originally drafted by the Arizona Diamondbacks in the 50th round (1,427th overall) of the 1997 Major League Baseball draft; he did not sign with them, however. He was drafted again in 2000, this time by the Anaheim Angels in the 3rd round as the 80th overall pick. He spent the next five seasons in the Angels' farm system, making his way through the minor leagues until the 2006 season.

Murphy made his Major League Baseball debut with the Angels on May 4, 2006, against the Detroit Tigers at Comerica Park in Detroit, Michigan. In his debut, Murphy went 2-for-4 with one RBI and scoring one run. On May 27, 2006, he hit his first home run, a solo shot versus the Baltimore Orioles off pitcher Adam Loewen.

On November 27, 2007, Murphy signed a minor league contract with the Washington Nationals. Murphy was assigned to the minor leagues and opted out of his contract on July 2, 2008; he went on to sign a minor league contract with the Florida Marlins, subsequently being assigned to Triple-A Albuquerque. He became a free agent at the end of the season and signed a minor league contract with the Kansas City Royals, for whom he played in 2009.
