= Jeff Fiorentino =

American baseball player (born 1983)

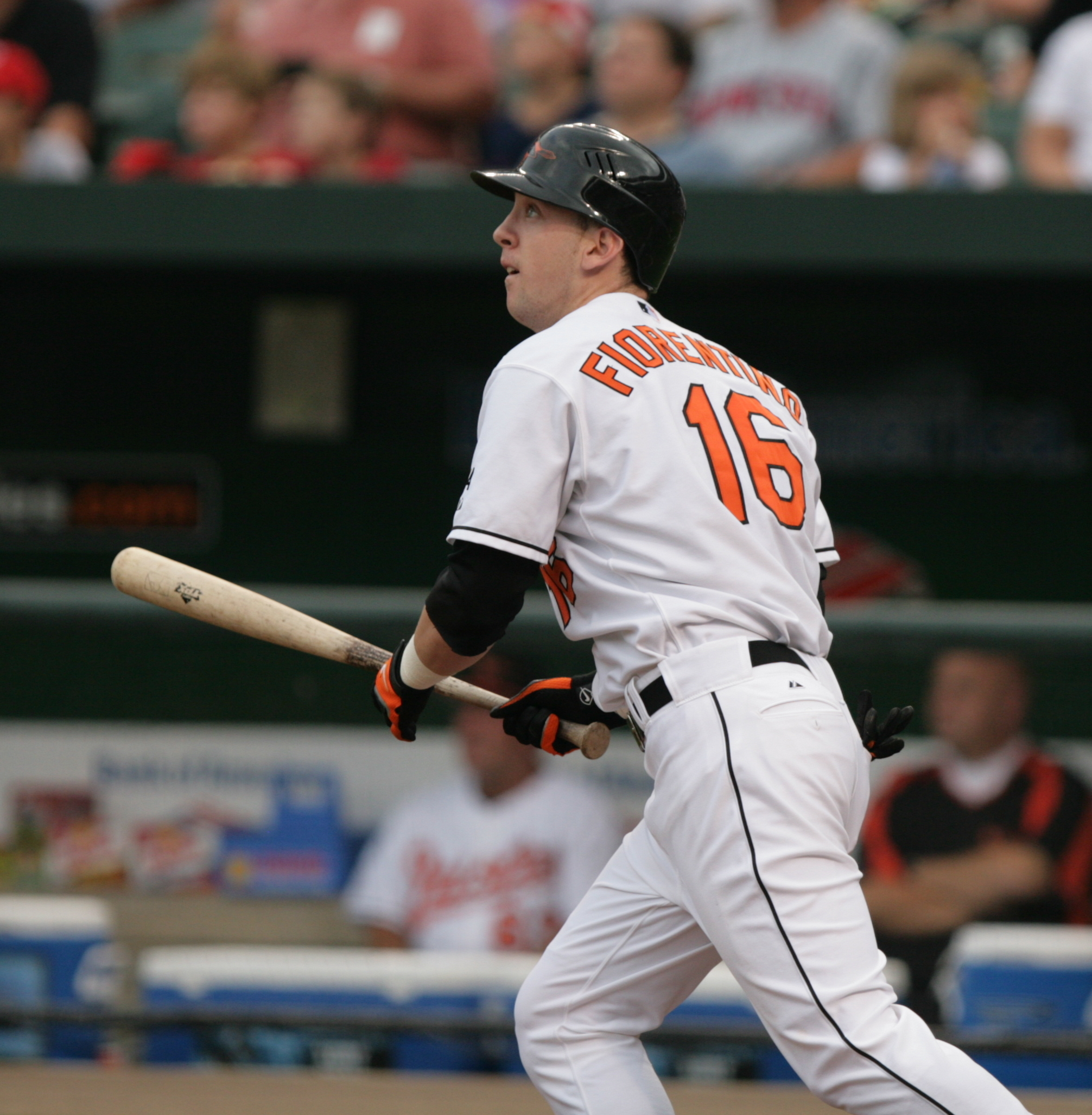
- Fiorentino with the Baltimore Orioles
- Outfielder
- Born: April 14, 1983 (age 43); Pembroke Pines, Florida, U.S.
- Batted: Left Threw: Right

Professional debut
- MLB: May 12, 2005, for the Baltimore Orioles
- NPB: March 26, 2010, for the Hiroshima Toyo Carp

Last appearance
- MLB: October 4, 2009, for the Baltimore Orioles
- NPB: June 13, 2010, for the Hiroshima Toyo Carp

MLB statistics
- Batting average: .270
- Home runs: 1
- Runs batted in: 21

NPB statistics
- Batting average: .246
- Home runs: 2
- Runs batted in: 15
- Stats at Baseball Reference

Teams
- Baltimore Orioles (2005–2006); Oakland Athletics (2008); Baltimore Orioles (2009); Hiroshima Toyo Carp (2010)

Jeffrey Philip Fiorentino (born April 14, 1983) is an American former professional baseball outfielder. He played in Major League Baseball (MLB) for the Baltimore Orioles and Oakland Athletics between 2005 and 2009. He also played in Nippon Professional Baseball (NPB) for the Hiroshima Toyo Carp in 2010. He was nicknamed Screech due to his resemblance to the character of the same name from the television sitcom Saved by the Bell.

== Playing career ==
=== Amateur ===
A native of Pembroke Pines, Florida, Fiorentino attended Nova High School and Florida Atlantic University, where he played baseball for the Owls under head coach Kevin Cooney. In 2003, he played collegiate summer baseball with the Cotuit Kettleers of the Cape Cod Baseball League.

=== Baltimore Orioles ===
During the 2005 season, Fiorentino played several games for the Baltimore Orioles after being called up from the Single-A Frederick Keys. He was then sent back down after nearly two weeks of action at the major league level. In 2006 and 2007, Fiorentino played for the Double-A Bowie Baysox.

=== Oakland Athletics ===
The Orioles designated Fiorentino for assignment on January 2, 2008, and on January 4 he was claimed off waivers by the Cincinnati Reds. On January 25, Fiorentino was claimed off waivers by the Oakland Athletics. Fiorentino made two appearances for Oakland, going 1-for-2 (.500) with one RBI. The remainder of his time was spent with the Triple-A Sacramento River Cats, for whom he went 6-for-22 (.273) with three RBI and one stolen base. Fiorentino was designated for assignment by Oakland on May 30.

=== Baltimore Orioles (second stint) ===
On June 5, 2008, Fiorentino was claimed off waivers by his original team, the Baltimore Orioles. He played in 68 games for the Triple-A Norfolk Tides, batting .268/.361/.355 with two home runs, 25 RBI, and seven stolen bases.

Fiorentino split the 2009 campaign between Norfolk and the Double-A Bowie Baysox, hitting .299/.375/.487 with 12 home runs, 67 RBI, and 15 stolen bases across 109 total appearances. On October 29, 2009, Fiorentino was removed from the 40-man roster and sent outright to Triple-A Norfolk.

=== Hiroshima Toyo Carp ===
On January 31, 2010, Fiorentino signed a minor league contract with the Baltimore Orioles. He was released to sign with the Hiroshima Toyo Carp of Nippon Professional Baseball. Fiorentino made 44 appearances for Hiroshima, slashing .246/.356/.325 with two home runs, 15 RBI, and two stolen bases.

=== Atlanta Braves ===
On May 4, 2011, Fiorentino was traded to the Atlanta Braves in exchange for cash considerations. He hit .238 with one home run and four RBI across 13 games for the Double–A Mississippi Braves; following a promotion to the Triple–A Gwinnett Braves, Fiorentino batted .260/.349/.394 with five home runs, 20 RBI, and three stolen bases (across 80 games).

=== Oakland Athletics ===
On November 19, 2011, Fiorentino signed a minor league contract with the Oakland Athletics. He made 16 appearances for the Triple–A Sacramento River Cats, hitting .186/.286/.256 with four RBI. Fiorentino was released by the Athletics organization on June 2, 2012.

=== York Revolution ===
On July 13, 2012, Fiorentino signed with the York Revolution of the Atlantic League of Professional Baseball. He made 66 appearances for the team, batting .312/.401/.426 with four home runs, 27 RBI, and four stolen bases.

Fiorentino appeared in 37 games for York during the 2013 campaign, slashing .329/.392/.453 with three home runs and 21 RBI. He was released by the Revolution on June 16, 2013.

== Coaching career ==
=== Florida Atlantic University ===
Fiorentino joined the staff of his alma mater, Florida Atlantic University in the summer of 2014. He worked primarily with the outfielders, hitters, and base runners. During his one year on staff, FAU made it to the championship game of the Gainesville Regional where they were defeated by the Florida Gators.

=== Chipola College ===
Fiorentino joined the Chipola College coaching staff in the summer of 2015. He currently works primarily with the infielders, catchers, hitters and base runners. Fiorentino helped guide the Indians to back-to-back Junior College World Series championship titles in 2017 and 2018. Also during his tenure, Chipola was the first team from Region XIII since the 1960s to participate in the Junior College World Series three consecutive years by winning the state tournament from 2017 through 2019. There have been 20 players selected in the Major League Baseball draft during his first four years on staff at Chipola.
