= Michael Crotta =

American baseball player (born 1984)

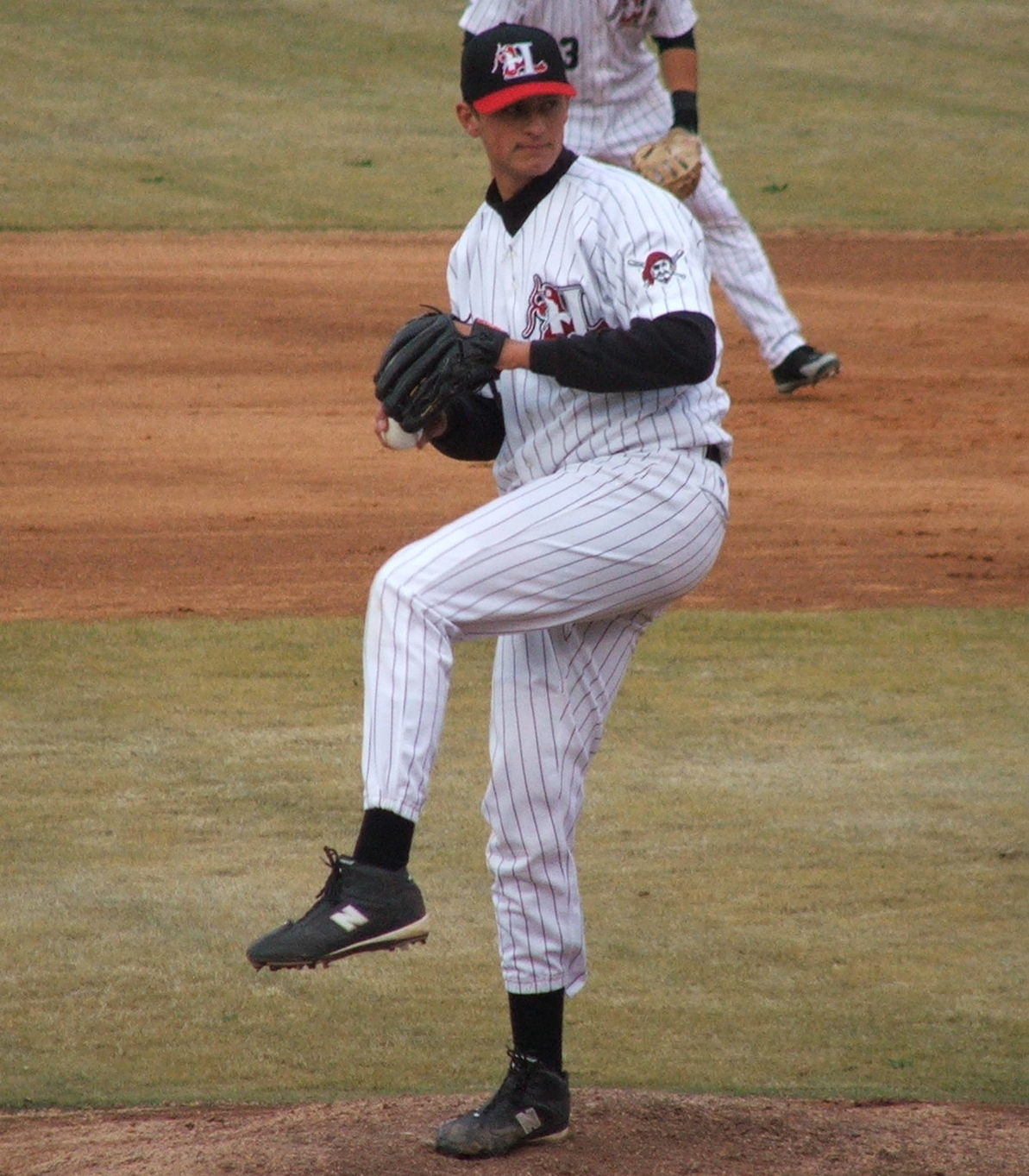
- Crotta with the Hickory Crawdads in 2007
- Pitcher
- Born: September 25, 1984 (age 41); Fort Lauderdale, Florida, U.S.
- Batted: Right Threw: Right

Professional debut
- MLB: April 3, 2011, for the Pittsburgh Pirates
- NPB: March 28, 2014, for the Hokkaido Nippon-Ham Fighters

Last appearance
- MLB: May 10, 2011, for the Pittsburgh Pirates
- NPB: August 22, 2015, for the Hokkaido Nippon-Ham Fighters

MLB statistics
- Win–loss record: 0–1
- Earned run average: 9.28
- Strikeouts: 7

NPB statistics
- Win–loss record: 6–7
- Earned run average: 3.93
- Strikeouts: 54
- Stats at Baseball Reference

Teams
- Pittsburgh Pirates (2011); Hokkaido Nippon-Ham Fighters (2014–2015)

Michael John Crotta (born September 25, 1984) is an American former professional baseball pitcher. He previously played for the Pittsburgh Pirates of Major League Baseball (MLB) and Hokkaido Nippon-Ham Fighters of Nippon Professional Baseball (NPB).

== Personal ==
He is the son of Buddy Crotta and Tammy Crotta.

== Amateur career ==
Crotta attended Martin County High School in Stuart, Florida. He was drafted in the 47th round of the 2003 Major League Baseball draft by the Philadelphia Phillies, however he opted to attend Florida Atlantic University, where he played baseball for the Owls under head coach Kevin Cooney. In the summer of 2005, he played for the Bourne Braves of the Cape Cod Baseball League. He was next drafted by the Pittsburgh Pirates in the 17th round of the 2006 Major League Baseball draft, beginning his professional career that year.

== Professional career ==
=== Pittsburgh Pirates ===
Crotta was assigned to Short-Season Williamsport, where he appeared in 11 games before earning a promotion to Single-A Hickory. In 15 games (11 starts) in 2006, he went 2–5 with a 4.87 ERA, striking out 35 in 61 innings. Crotta played 2007 with the Crawdads, but he also made one spot start with Double-A Altoona. In 27 games (26 starts) in 2007, he went 10–6 with a 4.50 ERA, striking out 74 in 140 innings. Crotta played all of 2008 with High-A Lynchburg, where in a league-leading 28 starts, he went 9–10 with a 4.67 ERA, striking out 97 in 146.1 innings while giving up a league-leading 171 hits. Crotta played in the Arizona Fall League with Scottsdale, where in 12 games, he went 1–1 with a 4.76 ERA, striking out 14 in 17 innings. Crotta pitched 2009 with Altoona, where in 27 starts, he went 7–8 with a 4.76 ERA, striking out 97 in 143.2 innings. Crotta was Altoona's Opening Day starter in 2010, where he made 4 starts before earning a promotion to Triple-A Indianapolis, where he made 24 more starts. In 28 starts in 2010, he went 7–10 with a 4.42 ERA, striking out 105 in 156.2 innings.

In 2011, Crotta made the Pirates' 25-man roster coming out of Spring Training. He made his Major League debut on April 3, 2011, against the Chicago Cubs coming into relief in the 7th inning. He retired all three batters he faced, recording one strike-out. On May 11, Crotta was placed on the disabled list with elbow inflammation. After making 4 rehab appearances (1 in Altoona and 3 in Indianapolis), Crotta was officially optioned to Indianapolis. On July 17, Crotta was placed on the disabled list in Indianapolis, and he didn't pitch for the rest of the season. In 15 games with Pittsburgh, he went 0–1 with a 9.28 ERA and 2 holds, striking out 7 in 10.2 innings.

On July 31, Crotta was designated for assignment to make room on the 40-man roster for recently acquired Derrek Lee and Ryan Ludwick. The club released him on August 8. He signed a minor league contract with Pittsburgh on August 11. In April 2012, Crotta had surgery, sidelining him for all of 2012. After the season, he became a minor league free agent.

=== Washington Nationals ===
On February 13, 2013, Crotta signed a minor league deal with the Washington Nationals. Crotta played 2013 with Triple-A Syracuse, where in 51 games (3rd in league), he went 6–7 with a 3.57 ERA and 29 games finished (9th in league), striking out 44 in 58 innings.

=== Hokkaido Nippon-Ham Fighters ===
On November 12, 2013, Crotta signed a two-year, $1 million deal with the Hokkaido Nippon-Ham Fighters of the Pacific League of Nippon Professional Baseball.

During the 2014 season, Crotta posted a 4–5 record with a 2.62 ERA and six saves for the Nippon Ham Fighters in. During the 2015 season, he posted a 2–2 record with a 6.59 ERA.

=== Detroit Tigers ===
On December 30, 2015, Crotta signed a minor league contract with the Detroit Tigers. He was released on May 9, 2016.

On June 12, 2017, Crotta retired and became a coach for the Little Wrigley Baseball Academy.
