= 2024 American Athletic Conference baseball tournament =

American college baseball tournament

- Teams: 8
- Format: Double-elimination tournament
- Finals site: BayCare Ballpark; Clearwater, FL
- Champions: Tulane (2nd title)
- Winning coach: Jay Uhlman (2nd title)

2024 American Athletic Conference baseball standings
| | Conf. | | | | Overall |
| Team | W | | L | PCT | W | | L | PCT |
|---|---|---|---|---|---|---|---|---|
| No. 14 East Carolina ‍†‍‍^{y} | 19 | – | 8 | .704 | 43 | – | 15 | .741 |
| UTSA ‍‍‍ | 17 | – | 10 | .630 | 32 | – | 24 | .571 |
| Tulane ‍‍‡‍^{y} | 15 | – | 12 | .556 | 35 | – | 24 | .593 |
| Wichita State ‍‍‍ | 15 | – | 12 | .556 | 32 | – | 29 | .525 |
| UAB ‍‍‍ | 13 | – | 14 | .481 | 26 | – | 29 | .473 |
| Florida Atlantic ‍‍‍ | 12 | – | 15 | .444 | 28 | – | 29 | .491 |
| Charlotte ‍‍‍ | 12 | – | 15 | .444 | 24 | – | 34 | .414 |
| Rice ‍‍‍ | 11 | – | 16 | .407 | 23 | – | 36 | .390 |
| South Florida ‍‍‍ | 11 | – | 16 | .407 | 26 | – | 29 | .473 |
| Memphis ‍‍‍ | 10 | – | 17 | .370 | 23 | – | 32 | .418 |
† – Conference champion ‡ – Tournament champion y – Invited to the NCAA tournament As of May 26, 2024; Rankings from D1Baseball

The 2024 American Athletic Conference Baseball Tournament was held at BayCare Ballpark in Clearwater, Florida from May 21 through May 26. The event, held at the end of the conference regular season, determined the champion of the American Athletic Conference for the 2022 season. The Tulane Green Wave won the double-elimination tournament and received the conference's automatic bid to the 2024 NCAA Division I baseball tournament.

== Format and seeding ==
The top eight baseball teams in The American were seeded based on their records in conference play. The tournament used a two bracket double-elimination format, leading to a single championship game between the winners of each bracket.

=== Bracket ===
First round
1 | East Carolina | 12
8 | Rice | 4
4 | Wichita State | 8
5 | UAB | 2
8 | Rice | 9
5 | UAB | 0
2 | UTSA | 5
7 | Charlotte | 9*
3 | Tulane | 14^
6 | Florida Atlantic | 2
2 | UTSA | 5
6 | Florida Atlantic | 12

Second round
1 | East Carolina | 4
4 | Wichita State | 14
8 | Rice | 7
1 | East Carolina | 8
7 | Charlotte | 5
3 | Tulane | 7
6 | Florida Atlantic | 10
7 | Charlotte | 8

Semifinals
4 | Wichita State | 4 | 12^
1 | East Carolina | 5 | 2
3 | Tulane | 13^ | –
6 | Florida Atlantic | 1 | –

Finals
4 | Wichita State | 10
3 | Tulane | 11

- * Game went to extra innings
- ^ Game ended after 7 innings because of mercy rule

== Schedule ==
| Game | Time* | Matchup^{#} | Score | Television |
Tuesday, May 21
| 1 | 9:00am | No. 4 Wichita State vs No. 5 UAB | 8–2 | ESPN+ |
| 2 | 12:30pm | No. 1 East Carolina vs No. 8 Rice | 12–4 | ESPN+ |
| 3 | 4:00pm | No. 2 UTSA vs No. 7 Charlotte | 5–9^{(12)} | ESPN+ |
| 4 | 7:30pm | No. 3 Tulane vs No. 6 Florida Atlantic | 14–2^{(7)} | ESPN+ |
Wednesday, May 22
| 5 | 1:00pm | No. 5 UAB vs No. 8 Rice | 0–9 | ESPN+ |
| 6 | 4:30pm | No. 2 UTSA vs No. 6 Florida Atlantic | 5–12 | ESPN+ |
Thursday, May 23
| 7 | 1:00pm | No. 4 Wichita State vs No. 1 East Carolina | 14–4 | ESPN+ |
| 8 | 4:30pm | No. 7 Charlotte vs No. 3 Tulane | 5–7 | ESPN+ |
Friday, May 24
| 9 | 1:00pm | No. 8 Rice vs No. 1 East Carolina | 7–8 | ESPN+ |
| 10 | 4:30pm | No. 6 Florida Atlantic vs No. 7 Charlotte | 10–8 | ESPN+ |
Semifinals – Saturday, May 25
| 11 | 9:00am | No. 4 Wichita State vs No. 1 East Carolina | 4–5 | ESPN+ |
| 12 | 12:30pm | No. 3 Tulane vs No. 6 Florida Atlantic | 13–1^{(7)} | ESPN+ |
| 13 | 4:00pm | No. 1 East Carolina vs No. 4 Wichita State | 2–12^{(7)} | ESPN+ |
Championship – Sunday, May 26
| 15 | 12:00pm | No. 4 Wichita State vs No. 3 Tulane | 10–11 | ESPNEWS |
*Game times in EDT. # – Rankings denote tournament seed.
