= John McCormack (baseball) =

American college baseball coach

Current position
- Title: Head coach
- Team: Florida Atlantic
- Conference: The American
- Record: 605–400–2 (.602)

Biographical details
- Born: 1967 or 1968 (age 58–59)
- Education: Pope John Paul II High School; Lynn University

Playing career
- 1987–1988: Indian River
- 1989–1990: Lynn
- Positions: Catcher, Third base

Coaching career (HC unless noted)
- 1991–2008: Florida Atlantic (asst.)
- 2009–present: Florida Atlantic

Head coaching record
- Overall: 605–400–2 (.602)
- Tournaments: NCAA: 9–10; Sun Belt: 8–8; C-USA: 14–13; AAC: 3–5

Accomplishments and honors

Championships
- 2× Sun Belt (2010, 2012); Sun Belt Tournament (2013); 2× C-USA (2016, 2019)

Awards
- Sun Belt Coach of the Year (2010); C-USA Coach of the Year (2019); FAU Athletics Hall of Fame Inductee (2019)

John McCormack is an American college baseball coach who has been the head coach of Florida Atlantic (FAU) since the start of the 2009 season. McCormack was named the Sun Belt Coach of the Year in 2010, and the Owls have appeared in two NCAA tournaments under him. Previously, he served as an assistant at FAU from 1991 to 2008. McCormack is an alumnus of both Indian River Community College and Lynn University.

== Coaching career ==
McCormack began his coaching career in 1991 and spent 18 years as an FAU assistant under head coach Kevin Cooney. During that time, the Owls appeared in six NCAA tournaments. McCormack handled much of the program's recruiting during his time as an assistant, focusing on players from the South Florida region where FAU is located. Although he was offered coaching positions at other schools and professional scouting jobs, McCormack chose to stay at FAU.

When Cooney retired at the end of the 2008 season, McCormack was hired to replace him. The Owls spent his first five seasons in the Sun Belt, winning two regular season titles and one tournament. They reached the NCAA tournament in 2010 and 2013, losing in the regional final both times. In 2010, McCormack was named the Sun Belt Coach of the Year. In 2013, after losing their opening game, the team reached the decisive seventh game of the Chapel Hill Regional against #1 national seed North Carolina. The Owls lost, 12–11, in a game that multiple media outlets described as "epic." Trailing 6–2 in the ninth, the Owls took an 8–6 lead, then gave up two runs in the bottom of the ninth to send the game to extra innings. They scored three in the top of the 12th, but UNC answered with three in the bottom half and walked off in the bottom of the 13th. The Owls moved to Conference USA following the 2013 season and missed the conference tournament in their first season in the league. In 2019, John McCormack was inducted into the FAU Athletics Hall of Fame.

== Head coaching record ==
Below is a table of McCormack's yearly records as a collegiate head baseball coach.

Record table
Season	Team	Overall	Conference	Standing	Postseason
Florida Atlantic Owls (Sun Belt Conference) (2009–2013)
2009	Florida Atlantic	30–26	12–17	T–7th	
2010	Florida Atlantic	37–24	21–9	T–1st	NCAA Regional
2011	Florida Atlantic	32–25	17–13	T–4th	
2012	Florida Atlantic	32–22	19–8	1st	
2013	Florida Atlantic	42–22	19–11	T–3rd	NCAA Regional
Florida Atlantic:		173–119 (.592)	88–58 (.603)		
Florida Atlantic Owls (Conference USA) (2014–2023)
2014	Florida Atlantic	28–25	14–16	9th	
2015	Florida Atlantic	42–19	19–10	T–2nd	NCAA Regional
2016	Florida Atlantic	39–19	21–8	1st	NCAA Regional
2017	Florida Atlantic	35–21–1	18–12	T–3rd	
2018	Florida Atlantic	43–19–1	19–8–1	3rd	NCAA Regional
2019	Florida Atlantic	41–21	22–8	1st	NCAA Regional
2020	Florida Atlantic	10–6	0–0		Season canceled due to COVID-19
2021	Florida Atlantic	32–25	18–14	3rd (East)	
2022	Florida Atlantic	35–23	19–11	T–3rd	
2023	Florida Atlantic	34–25	16–14	T-4th	C-USA tournament
Florida Atlantic Owls (American Athletic Conference) (2024–present)
2024	Florida Atlantic	28–29	12–15	T–6th	AAC Tournament
2025	Florida Atlantic	37–21	15–12	4th	AAC Tournament
2026	Florida Atlantic	28-28	12-15	6th	AAC Tournament
Florida Atlantic:		605–400–2 (.602)	205–143–1 (.589)		
Total:		605–400–2 (.602)			
National champion Postseason invitational champion Conference regular season champion Conference regular season and conference tournament champion Division regular season champion Division regular season and conference tournament champion Conference tournament champion

== Personal ==
McCormack played youth and high school baseball with former Cincinnati head coach Brian Cleary. He attended Pope John Paul II High School in Boca Raton. McCormack has two children; a sons Conor and Shane.

== See also ==
- List of current NCAA Division I baseball coaches
- Florida Atlantic Owls
