= Florida Atlantic Marching Owls =

Marching band of Florida Atlantic University

The Florida Atlantic Marching Owls
- School: Florida Atlantic University
- Location: Boca Raton, Florida, USA
- Conference: The American
- Founded: 2002
- Director: Marc Decker

The Florida Atlantic University Marching Owls is the marching band at Florida Atlantic University. The band plays for all home football games at FAU Stadium and at civic and community events in South Florida.

== History ==
After establishing a football program in 2001, Florida Atlantic University's president Anthony Catanese instigated plans to start an official university marching band the following year. The Director of Bands, George Sparks, pulled together 85 students who wearing a Caribbean style shirt and straw brimmed hats performed at home football games at Hard Rock Stadium in Miami for the 2002 and 2003 seasons. In 2003, Mr. Sparks took an administrative position and without a permanent leader the band went inactive in Fall 2004.

In April 2005, Christopher Chapman was hired as the university's first Director of Athletic Bands, overseeing the 'Parliament Sound' Pep Band which performs at basketball games, and the Marching Owls. In Fall 2005 he was able to successfully restart the marching band program as the football team jumped from Division I-AA to Division I-A in the Sunbelt Conference. 2005 was the first year the band performed in traditional blue and white marching uniforms, and the year many of its current traditions were established. In 2006, Sean Murray was hired as the Director of Athletic Bands and for the eleven years under his direction the band grew in size and quality. He officially adopted the name "Marching Owls" in 2006 and brought the band to their first out-of-state appearance at the New Orleans Bowl in 2007. The band traveled regularly during these years performing at away football games at Florida International University's Riccardo Silva Stadium, the University of Miami at Hard Rock Stadium, and the University of Florida at Ben Hill Griffin Stadium.

In 2011, Florida Atlantic University finished construction of its new 30,000 seat football stadium, FAU Stadium, and the Marching Owls performed at the inaugural game against Western Kentucky. With the new stadium came a greater interest in the schools football team and marching band. In 2014, the football team joined Conference USA and the Marching Owls continued to grow and build traditions to bolster the football atmosphere. The current Director of Athletic Bands is Marc Decker.
