= Kevin Cooney (baseball) =

American baseball coach (born 1950)

Biographical details
- Born: August 12, 1950 (age 76); New Jersey, U.S.
- Education: Montclair State University

Playing career
- 1970-1972: Montclair State
- Position: Pitcher

Coaching career (HC unless noted)
- 1975–1976: Montclair State (asst.)
- 1984–1987: Montclair State
- 1988–2008: Florida Atlantic

Head coaching record
- Overall: 880-530-10
- Tournaments: NCAA D1: 10-13; Sun Belt: 4-4; TAAC/A-Sun: 21-20; NCAA D2: 1-2; NCAA D3: 21-7

Accomplishments and honors

Championships
- NCAA D1 Regional: 2002; TAAC/A-Sun: 1999, 2003; A-Sun Tournament: 2004; NCAA D3: 1987; NCAA D3 Regional: 1984, 1985, 1986, 1987; NJAC: 1985

Awards
- A-Sun Coach of the Year: 1999

Kevin Cooney (born August 12, 1950) is an American former college baseball coach who was the head coach at Montclair State from 1984–1987 and Florida Atlantic from 1988–2008. Under Cooney, the teams combined to appear in 11 NCAA tournaments, including six in Division I. Montclair State won the Division III National Championship in 1987. Individually, Cooney was named the TAAC Coach of the Year in 1999.

== Playing career ==
A New Jersey native, Cooney attended Montclair State University in Montclair, New Jersey. He played baseball for the Red Hawks from 1970–1972. A pitcher, Cooney had a career 18-3 record, 2.35 ERA, and 164 strikeouts. In 1972, his final season at Montclair, the program appeared in its first NCAA tournament, finishing third in the East Regional. Following the season, the Minnesota Twins selected him in the 11th round of the MLB draft.

Cooney played two professional seasons, advancing as high as Class A Wisconsin Rapids before a shoulder injury ended his playing career. Over the two seasons, Cooney compiled a 19-11 record and a 3.43 ERA.

== Coaching career ==
=== Montclair State ===
Following his playing career, Cooney returned to Montclair State as an assistant under Clary Anderson, whom he had played for a few years earlier. Cooney worked as an assistant from 1975–1976. The Red Hawks made the NCAA tournament in both seasons. Anderson left to become the head coach at Fairleigh Dickinson after the 1976 season; Cooney also left Montclair and worked as a high school teacher and coach in the late 1970s and early 1980s.

When Montclair's next head coach, Fred Hill, left for Rutgers following the 1983 season, Cooney returned as the Red Hawks' head coach. In Cooney's four seasons at Montclair (1984–1987), the Red Hawks went 138-50-2, reached four Division III College World Series, and won the 1987 national championship. In 1987, the team went 3-0 to win its regional, defeating North Adams State, 11-5, and Upsala, 17-2 and 16-15 in 10 innings. At that year's College World Series, Montclair went 4-0 with two extra inning wins to win the title. It beat Eastern Connecticut, UC San Diego, and UW-Oshkosh to advance to the championship game, where it defeated Oshkosh, 13-12 in 10 innings.

During Cooney's stint at Montclair, three players were selected in the Major League Baseball draft, including seventh-round selection Dan Olsson in 1985.

=== Florida Atlantic ===
==== Division II ====
Prior to the 1988 season, Division II Florida Atlantic (FAU) hired Cooney to replace Steve Traylor, who had left to become the head coach at Duke. Cooney held the position for 21 seasons, leading FAU to Division I, seven NCAA tournaments, and a 742-480-5 overall record.

For Cooney's first six seasons, 1988–1993, FAU played as an independent school in Division II, though its schedule included a mix of Division I and Division II teams. In 1991, Cooney hired John McCormack, who would remain with the program as an assistant through the end of Cooney's tenure. He also opened the FAU Baseball Stadium in 1991. The Blue Wave's (Note: From the start of Cooney's tenure through the end of the 2005 season, FAU's baseball team was known as the "Blue Wave." After that point, the school officially adopted the "Owls" nickname for all its sports teams.) best season during this stretch was 1993, when it went 41-17 and reached an NCAA Regional championship game.

==== Division I ====
For the 1994 season, FAU transitioned to Division I, joining the Trans America Athletic Conference. (Note: In Cooney's first eight season in the conference (1994–2001), the Atlantic Sun was known as the Trans America Athletic Conference.)

After being ineligible for the postseason in 1994, the program made its first Division I postseason in 1995, finishing fourth in the TAAC to qualify for the TAAC Tournament. As the fourth seed, the Blue Wave won their first game against top-seeded FIU, then lost consecutive games to Stetson and UCF and was eliminated.

FAU reached its first Division I tournament in 1999, one of its best seasons under Cooney. It went 51-5 in the regular season; the season included a 34-game win streak from February to April that tied Texas's NCAA record. Pitcher Todd Moser was named the A-Sun Player of the Year. At the TAAC Tournament at Osceola County Stadium, the Blue Wave went 1-2 but qualified for the NCAA tournament with an at-large bid. At the Coral Gables Regional, the team lost its opener to FIU, then defeated Bethune-Cookman and FIU before losing to host Miami in the regional championship.

The Blue Wave returned to the NCAA tournament in 2000, then made their deepest postseason run under Cooney in 2002. After a 40-15 regular season in which they placed second in the A-Sun, the Blue Wave went 3-2 at the A-Sun Tournament, losing to top-seeded UCF in the title game. They were then awarded an at-large bid to the NCAA tournament as the third seed in the Tuscaloosa Regional. Both lower seeds won their regional openers (FAU 16-11 over Auburn), setting up a 1-0 game with Southeast Missouri State that FAU won to reach the regional championship round. There, they lost one game to host Alabama, 7-2, but defeated the Crimson Tide in the decisive seventh game to advance to the best-of-three super regional round. In the Atlanta Super Regional, Georgia Tech swept the Blue Wave in two games.

The 2002 appearance was the first of four consecutive NCAA tournaments for the program, but it did not advance past the regionals in 2003, 2004, or 2005. (Of Cooney's six Division I Tournament appearances at FAU, 2002 was the only year in which the Blue Wave were not placed at the Coral Gables Regional, hosted by nearby Miami.) In 2004, FAU won its only A-Sun Tournament under Cooney; Rusty Brown was named the tournament MVP.

During Cooney's 21 seasons at FAU, the program had 58 selections in the Major League Baseball draft. The highest was Jeff Fiorentino, a future Major Leaguer selected 79th overall in 2004. Other of Cooney's players to appear in Major League Baseball were Tim Harikkala, Carmen Cali, Tommy Murphy, Michael Crotta, Mickey Storey, and Jeff Beliveau.

FAU moved to the Sun Belt Conference for Cooney's final two seasons (2007–2008). The Owls (renamed following the 2005 season) had two 30-win seasons and made two Sun Belt tournaments, but did not qualify for the NCAA tournament in either season. Following the 2008 season, Cooney announced his retirement.

== Head coaching record ==
The following is a table of Cooney's yearly records as a collegiate head baseball coach.

Record table
Season	Team	Overall	Conference	Standing	Postseason
Montclair State (New Jersey Athletic Conference) (1984–1987)
1984	Montclair State	32-12-1	11-5		College World Series
1985	Montclair State	36-13-2	14-2	1st	College World Series
1986	Montclair State	36-11-1	13-3		College World Series
1987	Montclair State	34-14-1	14-2		College World Series
Montclair State:		138–50–5	52–12		
Florida Atlantic (Division II Independent) (1988–1993)
1988	Florida Atlantic	32-19-2			
1989	Florida Atlantic	30-23-2			
1990	Florida Atlantic	28-25			
1991	Florida Atlantic	24-31			
1992	Florida Atlantic	27-27			
1993	Florida Atlantic	41-17			NCAA Regional
Florida Atlantic (TAAC/A-Sun – Division I) (1994–2006)
1994	Florida Atlantic	31-23	N/A (Note: In 1994, its first season as a member of Division I and the TAAC, Florida Atlantic was ineligible for the conference standings.)		
1995	Florida Atlantic	27-31	17-13	4th	
1996	Florida Atlantic	39-23	9-9	3rd (South)	
1997	Florida Atlantic	32-24	8-9	3rd (South)	
1998	Florida Atlantic	29-30	6-14	4th (South)	
1999	Florida Atlantic	54-9	26-4	1st	NCAA Regional
2000	Florida Atlantic	43-19	20-7	T-2nd	NCAA Regional
2001	Florida Atlantic	36-24	14-13	5th	
2002	Florida Atlantic	46-21	22-8	2nd	NCAA Super Regional
2003	Florida Atlantic	41-16	25-8	1st	NCAA Regional
2004	Florida Atlantic	47-17	20-10	T-2nd	NCAA Regional
2005	Florida Atlantic	37-24	19-11	T-2nd	NCAA Regional
2006	Florida Atlantic	30-28	14-16	T-5th	
Florida Atlantic (Sun Belt Conference) (2007–2008)
2007	Florida Atlantic	36-22	15-15	T-6th	
2008	Florida Atlantic	32-27-1	15-12-1	4th	
Florida Atlantic:		742-480-5	230-149-1		
Total:		880-530-10			
National champion Postseason invitational champion Conference regular season champion Conference regular season and conference tournament champion Division regular season champion Division regular season and conference tournament champion Conference tournament champion

== Personal ==
Cooney has four children. His oldest son, Jim, pitched for Cooney from 1999–2002, was drafted by the Baltimore Orioles, and played three years of professional baseball.

Since retiring from coaching, Cooney has moved to Sweetwater, Tennessee and started business ventures in farming, antiques, and Christmas tree growing.

In 2012, Cooney was inducted into the FAU Hall of Fame.
