= Florida Atlantic Owls baseball =

Baseball team of Florida Atlantic University

Florida Atlantic Owls
- 2026 Florida Atlantic Owls baseball team
- Founded: 1981; 45 years ago
- University: Florida Atlantic University
- Head coach: John McCormack (18th season)
- Conference: American Conference
- Location: Boca Raton, Florida
- Home stadium: FAU Baseball Stadium (capacity: 2,000)
- Nickname: Owls
- Colors: Blue and red

NCAA regional champions
- 2002

NCAA tournament appearances
- 1985, 1993, 1999, 2000, 2002, 2003, 2004, 2005, 2010, 2013, 2015, 2016, 2018, 2019

Conference tournament champions
- Atlantic Sun: 2004; Sun Belt: 2013

Conference regular season champions
- NAIA: 1983; Atlantic Sun: 1999, 2003; Sun Belt: 2010, 2012; Conference USA: 2016, 2019

The Florida Atlantic Owls are the college baseball team of Florida Atlantic University which plays its home games at FAU Baseball Stadium. The Owls' head coach is John McCormack.

Fielding its first team in 1981, the Florida Atlantic University baseball team has experienced frequent success, shared respect from other baseball teams nationwide and the building of a power in NCAA baseball.

As of the 2023 season, the Owls have had 24 consecutive winning seasons. Additionally, the Owls have had only four losing seasons in 42 years of competition.

== Overview and history ==
Florida Atlantic University's baseball program began in 1981 and has seen success, growth and change in its 41 seasons of competition. Among the changes, the most noticeable to fans would be the change of the team name in 2005. University President Frank T. Brogan led the charge for the university to create a unified, single mark for FAU's athletic programs. The student-body decided "Owls" should be the athletic logo and in 2005, the baseball team lost its previous identity of "Blue Wave." Over the 30 years of competition, FAU baseball has jumped from the NAIA, to NCAA Division II, to NCAA Division I competition, and has reached success on all levels.

=== Steve Traylor era: The beginning ===
Under its first coach and first year of competition, FAU won its inaugural game, 12–8, against St. Thomas University on February 23, 1981. Steve Traylor coached FAU from 1981–1987 and oversaw the building of a program from scratch. After only three years of existence, FAU jumped from the NAIA level to the NCAA Division II level. If there was any doubts about this young program belonging on that level, its very first season would prove any doubters wrong. The Blue Wave opened the 1984 season with a win against in-state super-power University of Florida Gators, 5–4. FAU continued to win its first five games of the season, including another major upset, this time on the road at another in-state super-power, defeating University of Miami Hurricanes, 11–10. The Blue Wave finished the 1984 season with a record of 40–15, ranked 8th in the nation in the final NCAA Division II poll.

=== Kevin Cooney era: Division I and national success ===
During the offseason between 1987 and 1988, Steve Traylor left Florida Atlantic to become the head coach at Duke University. FAU hired Kevin Cooney, head coach of Montclair State University in New Jersey. Since the hiring, FAU has won 61% of their games and transformed itself from a local power in South Florida to a national baseball program on the Division I level. Coach Cooney arrived at FAU in 1988 and began his 20th season as head coach of the Owls on opening night of the 2007 season. Given the success and unprecedented heights that Cooney has taken FAU baseball, "Florida Atlantic" and "Kevin Cooney" have become synonymous with one another. Entering the 2007 season, Cooney has won 680 games (at FAU) and 820 (all-time, between FAU and Montclair State University, his alma mater and where he coached from 1984–1987).

In his 19+ seasons in Boca Raton, Cooney has coached a program at a university that has grown. Cooney has led for FAU baseball to enjoy including 67 athletes turning professional (with 4 reaching the majors). Cooney was inducted into the Palm Beach County Sports Hall of Fame in 2007.

On March 15, 2006, against Columbia University, Cooney reached a personal milestone, coaching a team to his 800th career victory.

On Thursday, April 24, 2008, Cooney announced that the 2008 season would be his last season as head coach of the Owls. Subsequently, on May 24, exactly a month after this announcement, Cooney coached his last game as FAU head coach when the Owls lost to Western Kentucky in the play-in championship game of the Sun Belt Conference championship Tournament.

==== All-time consecutive wins record ====
During the improbable 1999 season, when FAU finished with a school-best record of 54–9, Cooney led his team to an NCAA all-time record for consecutive wins. Starting February 19, in a 7–4 win over Bethune-Cookman College, the Blue Wave continued on to 34 consecutive wins. The streak lasted all the way to April 17, when Jacksonville University topped FAU, 2–1. The streak ended two days short of lasting two complete calendar months.

==== March to 800 ====
Cooney's milestone wins:

- 1st: March 14, 1984 (Montclair State 5, Southern Illinois 0)
- 100th: May 6, 1986 (Montclair State 9, Glassboro State 1)
- 200th: April 28, 1989 (FAU 3, UCF 2)
- 300th: March 15, 1993 (FAU 4, Rowan 3)
- 400th: March 18, 1996 (FAU 6, Northeastern 2)
- 500th: March 13, 1999 (FAU 8, Troy 2)
- 600th: March 31, 2001 (FAU 4, Stanford 3)
- 700th: May 9, 2003 (FAU 12, Georgia Southern 2)
- 800th: March 15, 2006 (FAU 8, Columbia 7)

=== John McCormack era: Sooner than five years ===
On July 1, 2008, Florida Atlantic named 18-year Assistant Coach, John McCormack, as Cooney's successor. McCormack served as Cooney's top assistant, associate head coach and recruiting coordinator for the 18 seasons before being elevated as head coach. With the foundation laid by Cooney, McCormack leads the Owls under intense pressure and high expectations. In 2019, John McCormack was inducted into the FAU Athletics Hall of Fame.

== Individual records and honors ==
=== No-hitters ===
- Tom Clark, 1982
- Jim Hanrahan, 1984
- Luis Merino, 1985
- Jim Drancsak, 1986
- John Sammon, 1994
- Mickey Storey, 2006

=== FAU Baseball Hall of Fame ===
In 2006, Florida Atlantic University inducted the first class to its new FAU Baseball Hall of Fame.

Name	Class
Keith Foley	2006
Scott Hay	2006
Todd Moser	2006
Jack Penrod	2006
Nick Presto	2006
Mike Ryan	2006
Warren "Doc" Schneider	2006
Steve Traylor	2006
Kevin Connacher (1994–'97)	2007
Doug Gonring (1984–'85)	2007
Tommy Murphy (1998–'00)	2007
Pat Murphy (1981–'82)	2007
Jorge Vega (1981–'83)	2007

=== All-Americans ===
17 players from FAU baseball have won recognition as "All-American": Keith Foley (1983), Mike Ryan (1984), Scott Hay (1986), Jack Penrod (1988), Todd Moser (1999), Dan Jackson (1999), Dickie Hart (1999), Randy Beam (2003), Jeff Fiorentino (2004), Mickey Storey (2005), Robbie Widlansky (2007), Mike McKenna (2008), Andy Mee (2010), Hugh Adams (2013), Brendon Sanger (2015), Rickey Santiago (2015), C.J. Chatham (2016).

=== Freshmen All-Americans ===
8 players from FAU baseball have won recognition as "Freshmen All-American": Kevin Connacher (1994), Rusty Brown (2001), Chris Pillsbury (2001), Jeff Fiorentino (2002), Derek Hutton (2002), Tim Mascia (2003), Mickey Storey (2005), Stephen Kerr (2014).

=== 2005 Mickey Storey ===
In 2005, as a freshman pitcher for FAU, Mickey Storey was named Collegiate Baseball's National Freshman Pitcher of the Year. Storey's stat line for his freshman season was one of the best posted by a pitcher in the nation.

Year	G/GS	W-L	Pct.	ERA	IP	H	R	ER	BB	SO
2005	23/9	10–1	.901	1.70	95.1	78	25	18	23	82

Storey's 1.70 ERA is a school-record for a single-season, and ranked fifth in the nation for the 2005 season among pitchers on the Division I level. His performance during the 2005 season awarded him an invitation to try out for the USA Baseball National Team.

Storey also took home numerous other awards that season, including All-American honors, Freshman All-American honors, All-Conference honors, and All-Conference Freshman honors.

=== 2007 Robbie Widlansky ===
In 2007 Robbie Widlansky won the Sun Belt Conference batting title his senior season (.430 average; breaking the school's season record), and Sun Belt Player of the Year, NCAA All-American honors, and First-Team All-Conference honors.

== Head coaches ==
Tenure	Coach	Years	Record	Pct.
1981–1987	Steve Traylor	7	268–107–2	.714
1988–2008	Kevin Cooney	21	748–480–5	.607
2009-pres.	John McCormack	17	577–372–2	.608
Totals	3 coaches	45 seasons	1593-959-9	.624

== Year by year records ==
Year	Record	Pct.	Coach	Postseason	Conference
1981	15–16–0	.484	Steve Traylor	None	NAIA
1982	42–14–0	.750	Steve Traylor	None	NAIA
1983	49–16–0	.754	Steve Traylor	NAIA District 25 Champions	NAIA
1984	40–15–0	.727	Steve Traylor	None	NAIA
1985	44–15–0	.746	Steve Traylor	NCAA South Regional	D-II Independent
1986	44–10–0	.815	Steve Traylor	None	D-II Independent
1987	34–21–2	.614	Steve Traylor	None	D-II Independent
1988	32–19–2	.623	Kevin Cooney	None	D-II Independent
1989	30–23–2	.564	Kevin Cooney	None	D-II Independent
1990	28–25–0	.528	Kevin Cooney	None	D-II Independent
1991	24–31–0	.436	Kevin Cooney	None	D-II Independent
1992	27–27–0	.500	Kevin Cooney	None	D-II Independent
1993	41–17–0	.707	Kevin Cooney	NCAA South Regional	D-II Independent
1994	31–23–0	.574	Kevin Cooney	None	Atlantic Sun
1995	27–31–0	.466	Kevin Cooney	None	Atlantic Sun
1996	39–23–0	.629	Kevin Cooney	None	Atlantic Sun
1997	32–24–0	.571	Kevin Cooney	None	Atlantic Sun
1998	29–30–0	.492	Kevin Cooney	None	Atlantic Sun
1999	54–9–0	.857	Kevin Cooney	Atlantic Sun Conference Champions; NCAA Regional	Atlantic Sun
2000	43–19–0	.694	Kevin Cooney	NCAA Regional	Atlantic Sun
2001	36–24–0	.600	Kevin Cooney	None	Atlantic Sun
2002	46–21–0	.687	Kevin Cooney	NCAA Super Regional	Atlantic Sun
2003	47–16–0	.746	Kevin Cooney	Atlantic Sun Conference Champions; NCAA Regional	Atlantic Sun
2004	47–17–0	.734	Kevin Cooney	Atlantic Sun Tournament champions NCAA Regional	Atlantic Sun
2005	37–24–0	.607	Kevin Cooney	NCAA Regional	Atlantic Sun
2006	30–28–0	.517	Kevin Cooney	None	Atlantic Sun
2007	36–22–0	.621	Kevin Cooney	None	Sun Belt
2008	32–27–1	.533	Kevin Cooney	None	Sun Belt
2009	30–26–0	.535	John McCormack	None	Sun Belt
2010	37–24–0	.607	John McCormack	Sun Belt Conference Champions; NCAA Regional	Sun Belt
2011	32–25–0	.561	John McCormack	None	Sun Belt
2012	32–22–0	.593	John McCormack	Sun Belt Conference Champions	Sun Belt
2013	42-22-0	.656	John McCormack	Sun Belt Tournament champions NCAA Regional	Sun Belt
2014	28-25	.528	John McCormack	None	Conference USA
2015	42-19	.689	John McCormack	NCAA Regional	Conference USA
2016	39-19	.672	John McCormack	Conference USA Regular season Champions NCAA Regional	Conference USA
2017	35-21-1	.612	John McCormack	None	Conference USA
2018	43-19-1	.690	John McCormack	NCAA Regional	Conference USA
2019	41-21	.661	John McCormack	Conference USA Regular season Champions NCAA Regional	Conference USA
2020	10-6	.625	John McCormack	Season Cancelled Due to Covid-19	Conference USA
2021	32-25	.561	John McCormack	None	Conference USA
2022	35-23	.603	John McCormack	None	Conference USA
2023	34-25	.576	John McCormack	None	Conference USA
2024	28-29	.491	John McCormack	None	The American
2025	37-21	.638	John McCormack	None	The American
Total	1552-938-9	.621	3 coaches		

== Postseason records ==
Florida Atlantic is 22-25 all-time in NCAA Division I postseason history (22–23 all-time in NCAA Regionals and 0–2 in NCAA Super Regionals).

Season	Record (Pct.)	Results
1999	2–2 (.500)	Coral Gables Regional: Lost to Florida International, defeated Bethune-Cookman and Florida International, eliminated by Miami (FL) in the Regional Finals (0–1)
2000	1–2 (.333)	Coral Gables Regional: Won over Florida International, lost to Miami (FL), eliminated by Florida International
2002	3–3 (.500)	Tuscaloosa Regional: Won over Auburn, defeated SE Missouri State, defeated Alabama in the Regional Finals (1–1); Atlanta Super Regional: Lost to Georgia Tech (0–2)
2003	1–2 (.333)	Coral Gables Regional: Won over Florida, lost to Miami (FL), eliminated by Florida
2004	2–2 (.500)	Coral Gables Regional: Lost to North Carolina State, defeated St. Bonaventure and North Carolina State, eliminated by Miami (FL) in the Regional Finals (0–1)
2005	1–2 (.333)	Coral Gables Regional: Lost to Mississippi State, defeated VCU, eliminated by Mississippi State
2010	2–2 (.500)	Gainesville Regional: Lost to Oregon State, defeated Bethune-Cookman and Oregon State, eliminated by Florida in the Regional Finals (0–1)
2013	3–2 (.600)	Chapel Hill Regional: Lost to Towson, defeated Canisius and Towson, eliminated by North Carolina in the Regional Finals (1–1)
2015	2–2 (.500)	Gainesville Regional: Lost to South Florida, defeated Florida A&M and South Florida, eliminated by Florida in the Regional Finals (0–1)
2016	1–2 (.333)	Coral Gables Regional: Lost to Long Beach State, defeated Stetson, eliminated by Long Beach State
2018	3–2 (.600)	Gainesville Regional: Lost to Jacksonville, defeated Columbia and Jacksonville, eliminated by Florida in the Regional Finals (1–1)
2019	1–2 (.333)	Athens Regional: Lost to Florida State, defeated Mercer, eliminated by Georgia

== Professional Owls ==
=== Owls in the majors ===
Florida Atlantic Owls to reach Major League Baseball:

- Tim Harikkala, pitcher (1995–2005)
- Carmen Cali, pitcher (2005–2008)
- Jeff Fiorentino, outfielder (2005–2008)
- Tommy Murphy, outfielder (2006–2007)
- Mike Crotta, pitcher (2011)
- Jeff Beliveau, pitcher (2012–2015, 2017-2018)
- Mickey Storey, pitcher (2012–2013)
- R.J. Alvarez, pitcher (2014–2015, 2022)
- Ryan Garton, pitcher for the Tampa Bay Rays (2016–2021)
- Austin Gomber, pitcher for the Colorado Rockies (2018, 2020–present)
- Nolan Schanuel, first baseman for the Los Angeles Angels (2023-present)
- Dustin Harris, outfielder for the Texas Rangers (2024-present)
- Pedro Pagés, catcher for the St. Louis Cardinals (2024-present)

== See also ==
- List of NCAA Division I baseball programs
