= FAU Baseball Stadium =

Baseball stadium in Florida, United States

- Interactive map of FAU Baseball Stadium
- Full name: Florida Atlantic University Baseball Stadium
- Location: Volusia Street, Boca Raton, Florida, U.S.
- Coordinates: 26.370592°N 80.109456°W
- Owner: Florida Atlantic University
- Operator: Florida Atlantic University
- Capacity: 2,000
- Surface: Natural grass
- Scoreboard: Electronic
- Record attendance: 2,348

Construction
- Built: 1991

Tenant
- Florida Atlantic Owls baseball (NCAA DI American Conference) (1991–present)

FAU Baseball Stadium is a baseball venue located in Boca Raton, Florida, United States. It has been home to the Florida Atlantic Owls baseball team since 1991. The venue has a capacity of 2,000 spectators and features Triple-A-quality lighting.

== Attendance record ==
On April 16, 2008, the Owls were defeated at FAU Baseball Stadium by the then-#1 ranked Miami Hurricanes. The 2,348 spectators in attendance set a stadium record.

== Features ==
The venue features a berm seating area, which allows for increased capacity, down each foul line.

== Praise and criticism ==
In 2012, college baseball writer Eric Sorenson ranked the stadium as the fifth best small venue in Division I baseball.

Others, including players and coaches from the program, have criticized the facility's poor conditions.

== See also ==
- List of NCAA Division I baseball venues
