= 2022 Central Michigan Chippewas baseball team =

2022 Central Michigan Chippewas baseball

MAC tournament champion

Gainesville Regional, 1–2
- Conference: Mid-American Conference
- Record: 43–19 (30–7 MAC)
- Head coach: Jordan Bischel (4th season)
- Associate head coach: Kyle Schroeder (4th season)
- Assistant coaches: Tony Jandron (4th season); Tom Winske (4th season)
- Home stadium: Bill Theunissen Stadium

2022 Mid-American Conference baseball standings
	Conf.				Overall
Team	W		L	PCT	W		L	PCT
Ball State ‍†‍‍	32	–	7	.821	40	–	19	.678
Central Michigan ‍‍‡‍^{y}	30	–	7	.811	42	–	17	.712
Toledo ‍‍‍	23	–	16	.590	33	–	25	.569
Ohio ‍‍‍	21	–	15	.583	30	–	24	.556
Kent State ‍‍‍	19	–	19	.500	24	–	29	.453
Miami (OH) ‍‍‍	18	–	22	.450	23	–	33	.411
Eastern Michigan ‍‍‍	16	–	24	.400	22	–	34	.393
Western Michigan ‍‍‍	15	–	24	.385	18	–	36	.333
Bowling Green ‍‍‍	14	–	24	.368	18	–	35	.340
Northern Illinois ‍‍‍	13	–	25	.342	14	–	40	.259
Akron ‍‍‍	11	–	29	.275	15	–	41	.268
† – Conference champion ‡ – Tournament champion y – Invited to the NCAA tournament Rankings from D1Baseball

The 2022 Central Michigan Chippewas baseball team represented Central Michigan University during the 2022 NCAA Division I baseball season. The Chippewas played their home games at Bill Theunissen Stadium as a member of the Mid-American Conference They were led by head coach Jordan Bischel, in his fourth year as manager.

== Personnel ==
=== Roster ===
2022 Central Michigan Chippewas baseball team
Players
Coaches

#	Pos.	Name	B/T	Height	Weight	Year	Home town
1	INF	Mario Camilletti	L/R	5 ft 9 in (1.75 m)	195 lb (88 kg)	Sr	Sterling Heights, Mich
2	INF	Bobby Ball	R/R	5 ft 11 in (1.8 m)	170 lb (77 kg)	Fr	Brookfield, Wis.
3	OF	Robby Morgan IV	R/R	6 ft 4 in (1.93 m)	207 lb (94 kg)	Fr	Groveport, Ohio
4	OF	Drew Lechnir	L/L	5 ft 9 in (1.75 m)	160 lb (73 kg)	So	Kimberly, Wis.
6	RHP	Jordan Patty	R/R	6 ft 1 in (1.85 m)	175 lb (79 kg)	Sr	Midland, Mich.
7	RHP	Ryan Insco	R/R	5 ft 11 in (1.8 m)	170 lb (77 kg)	So	Kirkwood, Mo.
8	OF	Jacob Donahue	R/R	6 ft 0 in (1.83 m)	155 lb (70 kg)	So	Joliet, Ill.
9	INF	Zach Lechnir	R/R	5 ft 10 in (1.78 m)	160 lb (73 kg)	So	Kimberly, Wis.
10	INF	Justin Simpson	S/R	5 ft 7 in (1.7 m)	170 lb (77 kg)	Jr	Orange, Calif.
11	LHP	Adam Mrakitsch	L/R	6 ft 0 in (1.83 m)	160 lb (73 kg)	Fr	Howell, Mich.
12	RHP	Cameron Miller	R/R	6 ft 10 in (2.08 m)	235 lb (107 kg)	Sr	Lake Orion, Mich.
13	RHP	Ben Vitas	R/R	6 ft 0 in (1.83 m)	183 lb (83 kg)	So	Shorewood, Ill.
14	INF	Luke Sefcik	R/R	5 ft 9 in (1.75 m)	165 lb (75 kg)	Fr	Palos Heights, Ill.
15	LHP	Ryan Culley	L/L	6 ft 0 in (1.83 m)	195 lb (88 kg)	Jr	Swansea, Ill.
16	RHP	Michael Conte	R/R	6 ft 3 in (1.91 m)	195 lb (88 kg)	Fr	Cincinnati, Ohio
17	C	Spencer Verburg	R/R	6 ft 2 in (1.88 m)	190 lb (86 kg)	Fr	Grandville, Mich.
18	RHP	Logan Buczkowski	L/R	6 ft 3 in (1.91 m)	210 lb (95 kg)	Sr	Mount Pleasant, Mich.
19	C	Kade Preston	R/R	6 ft 4 in (1.93 m)	185 lb (84 kg)	So	Dewitt, Mich.
20	LHP	Garrett Navarra	L/L	5 ft 11 in (1.8 m)	195 lb (88 kg)	Jr	Sterling Heights, Mich.
21	C	Adam Proctor	L/R	6 ft 1 in (1.85 m)	235 lb (107 kg)	Sr	St Johns, Mich.
22	LHP	Ryan Palmblad	L/L	6 ft 3 in (1.91 m)	195 lb (88 kg)	Jr	Orlando Park, Ill.
23	C	Nick Dardas	R/R	5 ft 10 in (1.78 m)	175 lb (79 kg)	So	Bay City, Mich.
24	INF	Aidan Shepardson	R/R	6 ft 1 in (1.85 m)	190 lb (86 kg)	Sr	Round Rock, Texas
25	INF	Danny Wuestenfeld	R/R	6 ft 3 in (1.91 m)	215 lb (98 kg)	So	Plainfield, Ill.
26	INF	Colton Coca	R/R	6 ft 4 in (1.93 m)	210 lb (95 kg)	So	Racine, Wis.
27	C	Shane Ryan	R/R	6 ft 0 in (1.83 m)	195 lb (88 kg)	So	Markesan, Wis.
28	RHP	Aaron Husson	R/R	6 ft 2 in (1.88 m)	215 lb (98 kg)	Sr	Hawley, Penn.
29	OF	Kurt Paldino	L/R	6 ft 1 in (1.85 m)	200 lb (91 kg)	Sr	Overland Park, Kan.
30	INF	Greg Guzik II	R/R	5 ft 10 in (1.78 m)	185 lb (84 kg)	Fr	Macomb, Mich.
31	RHP	Andrew Taylor	R/R	6 ft 5 in (1.96 m)	190 lb (86 kg)	So	Alto, Mich.
32	RHP	Jake Jones	R/R	6 ft 4 in (1.93 m)	200 lb (91 kg)	Sr	Oak Forest, Ill.
35	INF	Chris Monroe	R/R	6 ft 5 in (1.96 m)	250 lb (113 kg)	Sr	Champaign, Ill.
36	C	Drew Stengren	R/R	6 ft 1 in (1.85 m)	190 lb (86 kg)	So	Fox River Grove, Ill.
37	LHP	Jack Fecko	L/L	6 ft 4 in (1.93 m)	200 lb (91 kg)	Fr	Aurora, Ohio
38	LHP	Drew Alsobrooks	R/L	6 ft 2 in (1.88 m)	210 lb (95 kg)	So	Livonia, Mich.
40	LHP	Garrett Willis	L/L	6 ft 4 in (1.93 m)	200 lb (91 kg)	Jr	Midland, Mich.
41	RHP	Avery Mona	R/R	6 ft 2 in (1.88 m)	217 lb (98 kg)	Fr	Bloomfield Hills, Mich.
42	OF	Brendan Lowry	L/R	5 ft 10 in (1.78 m)	185 lb (84 kg)	Fr	Livonia, Mich.
43	INF	Shane Baumgarten	R/R	6 ft 0 in (1.83 m)	195 lb (88 kg)	Fr	Wheaton, Ill.
44	OF	Jakob Marsee	L/L	6 ft 0 in (1.83 m)	180 lb (82 kg)	So	Allen Park, Mich.
48	INF	Sandyn Cuthrell	R/R	6 ft 1 in (1.85 m)	190 lb (86 kg)	Fr	Cass City, Mich.
49	RHP	Clayton Brock	L/R	6 ft 2 in (1.88 m)	220 lb (100 kg)	So	Cincinnati, Ohio

Head coach

Jordan Bischel

Assistant coach(es)

Tony Jandron, Kyle Schroeder, Tom Winske

Legend

- (C) Team captain
- (S) Suspended
- (I) Ineligible
- Injured
- Current redshirt

== Preseason ==
=== MAC Coaches poll ===
The MAC coaches poll was released on February 15, 2022 with Central Michigan predicted to finish first in the Mid-American Conference, receiving six out of eleven first place votes. Despite being picked to finish third Kent State received two first place votes, while Ball State, Toledo, and Miami each received one of the three remaining first place votes. The Chippewas were also slated to win the 2022 MAC tournament garnering four of the eleven votes. The other vote-getters were 12 time conference tournament champion Kent State with three votes, one time champion Ball State with two, and respective three and zero time champions Miami and Toledo each receiving one of the remaining two.

Coaches poll
Predicted finish	Team	Points (1st place votes)
1	Central Michigan	115 (6)
2	Ball State	103 (1)
3	Kent State	102 (2)
4	Western Michigan	75
5	Toledo	73 (1)
6	Miami	68 (1)
7	Ohio	58
8	Eastern Michigan	45
9	Bowling Green	40
10	Northern Illinois	36
11	Akron	11

== Schedule and results ==
2022 Central Michigan Chippewas baseball game log (43–19)
Legend: = Win = Loss = Canceled Bold = Central Michigan Team Member
Regular season (38–16)

February (3–4)
Date	Time (ET)	TV	Opponent	Rank	Stadium	Score	Win	Loss	Save	Attendance	Overall record	MAC record	Box Score	Recap
February 18	11:00 a.m.	—	vs. West Virginia*	—	Spring Brooks Stadium • Conway, SC	**L** 8–13	Lowery (1–0)	**Patty** **(0–1)**	—	969	0–1	—	Box Score	Recap
February 19	3:30 p.m.	ESPN+	at Coastal Carolina*	—	Spring Brooks Stadium • Conway, SC	**L** 4–8	Potok (1–0)	**Navarra** **(0–1)**	Sharkey (1)	1,837	0–2	—	Box Score	Recap
February 20	11:00 a.m.	—	vs. West Virginia	—	Spring Brooks Stadium • Conway, SC	**L** 0–10	Sleeper (1–0)	**Buczkowski** **(0–1)**	—	1,055	0–3	—	Box Score	Recap
February 25	4:00 p.m.	—	at Western Kentucky*	—	Nick Denes Field • Bowling Green, KY	**W** 6–4	**Jones** **(1–0)**	Aristotle (0–1)	—	97	1–3	—	Box Score	Recap
February 26	1:00 p.m.	—	at Western Kentucky*	—	Nick Denes Field • Bowling Green, KY	**W** 7–4	**Taylor** **(1–0)**	Stofel (0–2)	**Jones** **(1)**	148	2–3	—	Box Score	Recap
February 26	4:00 p.m.	—	at Western Kentucky*	—	Nick Denes Field • Bowling Green, KY	**W** 3–0	**Palmblad** **(1–0)**	Hellman (0–1)	**Navarra** **(1)**	177	3–3	—	Box Score	Recap
February 27	2:00 p.m.	—	at Western Kentucky*	—	Nick Denes Field • Bowling Green, KY	**L** 7–14	Terbrak (1–0)	**Vitas** **(0–1)**	—	131	3–4	—	Box Score	Recap

March (7–6)
Date	Time (ET)	TV	Opponent	Rank	Stadium	Score	Win	Loss	Save	Attendance	Overall record	MAC record	Box Score	Recap
March 5	12:00 p.m.	—	vs. UMass-Lowell*	—	David F. Couch Ballpark • Winston-Salem, NC	**L** 4–7	Keevan (1–1)	**Patty** **(1–1)**	—	157	3–5	—	Box Score	Recap
March 5	4:00 p.m.	ACCN Extra	at Wake Forest*	—	David F. Couch Ballpark • Winston-Salem, NC	**L** 2–4	Hartle (3–0)	**Taylor** **(1–1)**	Adler (3)	1,112	3–6	—	Box Score	Recap
March 6	12:00 p.m.	—	vs. UMass-Lowell*	—	David F. Couch Ballpark • Winston-Salem, NC	**L** 7–15	Becker (1–2)	**Navarra** **(0–2)**	—	64	3–7	—	Box Score	Recap
March 8	3:00 p.m.	—	at North Carolina A&T*	—	World War Memorial Stadium • High Point, NC	**W** 9–3	**Mrakitsch** **(1–0)**	Brown (0–1)	—	279	4–7	—	Box Score	Recap
March 11	12:00 p.m.	—	at Kent State	—	Schoonover Stadium • Kent, OH	**L** 0–1 (7) (Note: Game 1 of doubleheader was 7 innings)	Dell (2–0)	**Taylor** **(1–2)**	—	210	4–8	0–1	Box Score	Recap
March 11	3:00 p.m.	—	at Kent State	—	Schoonover Stadium • Kent, OH	**W** 6–5	**Navarra** **(1–2)**	Romel (1–3)	**Jones** **(2)**	247	5–8	1–1	Box Score	Recap
March 13	5:00 p.m.	—	at Kent State	—	Schoonover Stadium • Kent, OH	**Cancelled** due to rain								
March 19	12:00 p.m.	—	at Miami (OH)	—	McKie Field • Oxford, OH	**W** 2–0	**Patty** **(1–2)**	Demonica (1–2)	**Insco** **(1)**	192	6–8	2–1	Box Score	Recap
March 20	1:00 p.m.	—	at Miami (OH)	—	McKie Field • Oxford, OH	**W** 5–4	**Taylor** **(2–2)**	Ronevich (0–1)	**Jones** **(3)**	195	7–8	3–1	Box Score	Recap
March 20	4:00 p.m.	—	at Miami (OH)	—	McKie Field • Oxford, OH	**W** 8–2	**Navarra** **(2–2)**	Leverton (1–1)	—	160	8–8	4–1	Box Score	Recap
March 21	1:00 p.m.	—	at Miami (OH)	—	McKie Field • Oxford, OH	**W** 13–1	**Palmblad** **(2–0)**	Maxey (1–1)	—	130	9–8	5–1	Box Score	Recap
March 25	5:00 p.m.	BTN+	at Iowa*	—	Duane Banks Field • Iowa City, IA	**L** 4–7	Henderson (1–0)	**Insco** **(0–1)**	Llewellyn (3)	563	9–9	—	Box score	Recap
March 26	4:00 p.m.	BTN+	at Iowa*	—	Duane Banks Field • Iowa City, IA	**W** 10–1	**Navarra** **(3–2)**	Nedved (1–2)	—	937	10–9	—	Box score	Recap
March 27	2:00 p.m.	BTN+	at Iowa*	—	Duane Banks Field • Iowa City, IA	**L** 2–4	Llewellyn (1–0)	**Jones** **(1–1)**	Henderson (1)	589	10–10	—	Box score	Recap

April (18–3)
Date	Time (ET)	TV	Opponent	Rank	Stadium	Score	Win	Loss	Save	Attendance	Overall record	MAC record	Box Score	Recap
April 2	12:00 p.m.	CSN Digital	Ohio	—	Theunissen Stadium • Mount Pleasant, MI	**W** 5–1	**Patty** **(2–2)**	Kutt IV (2–3)	—	347	11–10	6–1	Box Score	Recap
April 2	3:15 p.m.	CSN Digital	Ohio	—	Theunissen Stadium • Mount Pleasant, MI	**W** 8–3 (7) (Note: Game 2 of doubleheader was 7 innings)	**Jones** **(2–1)**	Manis (3–2)	**Palmblad** **(1)**	250	12–10	7–1	Box Score	Recap
April 3	12:00 p.m.	CSN Digital	Ohio	—	Theunissen Stadium • Mount Pleasant, MI	**W** 5–2 (7)	**Taylor** **(3–2)**	Tate (1–2)	**Insco** **(2)**	316	13–10	8–1	Box Score	Recap
April 3	3:00 p.m.	CSN Digital	Ohio	—	Theunissen Stadium • Mount Pleasant, MI	**W** 12–6	**Jones** **(3–1)**	Roder (1–1)	—	316	14–10	9–1	Box Score	Recap
April 8	3:30 p.m.	CSN Digital	Northern Illinois	—	Theunissen Stadium • Mount Pleasant, MI	**W** 8–2	**Patty** **(3–2)**	Seebach (1–5)	—	228	15–10	10–1	Box Score	Recap
April 9	2:00 p.m.	CSN Digital	Northern Illinois	—	Theunissen Stadium • Mount Pleasant, MI	**W** 11–0 (7) (Note: Game called after 7 innings due to 10 run mercy rule.)	**Taylor** **(4–2)**	Klawiter (1–4)	—	387	16–10	11–1	Box Score	Recap
April 10	12:00 p.m.	CSN Digital	Northern Illinois	—	Theunissen Stadium • Mount Pleasant, MI	**W** 12–0 (7)	**Navarra** **(4–2)**	Lasiewicz (1–5)	—	250	17–10	12–1	Box Score	Recap
April 10	3:00 p.m.	CSN Digital	Northern Illinois	—	Theunissen Stadium • Mount Pleasant, MI	**W** 8–5	**Buczkowski** **(1–1)**	Meyer (0–1)	—	487	18–10	13–1	Box Score	Recap
April 12	2:30 p.m.	—	at Oakland*	—	Oakland Baseball Field • Rochester, MI	**W** 21–8	**Brock** **(1–0)**	Pidek (1–1)	—	194	19–10	—	Box Score	Recap
April 15	3:00 p.m.	—	at Bowling Green	—	Steller Field • Bowling Green, OH	**W** 18–11	**Patty** **(4–2)**	Schenk (1–4)	—	258	20–10	14–1	Box Score	Recap
April 16	12:00 p.m.	—	at Bowling Green	—	Steller Field • Bowling Green, OH	**W** 9–1 (7)	**Taylor** **(3–1)**	Wilson (3–4)	—	367	21–10	15–1	Box Score	Recap
April 16	3:00 p.m.	—	at Bowling Green	—	Steller Field • Bowling Green, OH	**W** 9–4	**Navarra** **(5–2)**	Penrod (1–2)	**Palmblad** **(2)**	367	22–10	16–1	Box Score	Recap
April 17	1:00 p.m.	BCSN	at Bowling Green	—	Steller Field • Bowling Green, OH	**W** 9–0	**Buczkowski** **(2–1)**	Abrahamowicz (1–2)	**Jones** **(4)**	227	23–10	17–1	Box Score	Recap
April 19	3:00 p.m.	CSN Digital	Madonna*	—	Theunissen Stadium • Mount Pleasant, MI	**W** 23–5	**Mrakitsch** **(2–0)**	Mencotti (0–3)	—	154	24–10	—	Box Score	Recap
April 22	1:30 p.m.	CSN Digital	Akron	—	Theunissen Stadium • Mount Pleasant, MI	**W** 11–10	**Vitas** **(1–1)**	Herrick (1–1)	**Jones** **(5)**	260	25–10	18–1	Box Score	Recap
April 23	12:00 p.m.	CSN Digital	Akron	—	Theunissen Stadium • Mount Pleasant, MI	**W** 8–0 (7)	**Taylor** **(6–2)**	Fett (0–7)	—	400	26–10	19–1	Box Score	Recap
April 23	3:30 p.m.	CSN Digital	Akron	—	Theunissen Stadium • Mount Pleasant, MI	**W** 4–2	**Jones** **(4–1)**	Tortorella (2–2)	—	716	27–10	20–1	Box Score	Recap
April 24	10 a.m.	CSN Digital	Akron	—	Theunissen Stadium • Mount Pleasant, MI	**W** 16–0 (7)	**Mrakitsch** **(3–0)**	Biglin (0–2)	—	210	28–10	21–1	Box Score	Recap
April 29	3:00 p.m.	—	at Ball State	—	Ball Diamond • Muncie, IN	**L** 1–7	Schweitzer (7–2)	**Taylor** **(6–3)**	Klein (8)	345	28–11	21–2	Box Score	Recap
April 30	12:00 p.m.	—	at Ball State	—	Ball Diamond • Muncie, IN	**L** 4–6 (8) (Note: Game 1 of doubleheader was scheduled for 7 innings but went to extra innings)	Brown (2–2)	**Patty** **(4–3)**	—	508	28–12	21–3	Box Score	Recap
April 30	3:00 p.m.	—	at Ball State	—	Ball Diamond • Muncie, IN	**L** 7–10 (7)	Dohm (2–1)	**Palmblad** **(2–1)**	Klein (9)	609	28–13	21–4	Box Score	Recap

May (10–3)
Date	Time (ET)	TV	Opponent	Rank	Stadium	Score	Win	Loss	Save	Attendance	Overall record	Big 12 Record	Box Score	Recap
May 1	1:00 p.m.	—	at Ball State	—	Ball Diamond • Muncie, IN	**L** 3–4	Klein (3–2)	**Jones** **(4–2)**	—	782	28–14	21–5	Box Score	Recap
May 6	3:00 p.m.	CSN Digital	Western Michigan	—	Theunissen Stadium • Mount Pleasant, MI	**W** 11–4	**Patty** **(5–3)**	Crandell (2–4)	—	426	29–14	22–5	Box Score	Recap
May 7	12:00 p.m.	CSN Digital	Western Michigan	—	Theunissen Stadium • Mount Pleasant, MI	**W** 19–7 (7)	**Taylor** **(7–3)**	Armbrustmach (3–5)	—	470	30–14	23–5	Box Score	Recap
May 7	3:00 p.m.	CSN Digital	Western Michigan	—	Theunissen Stadium • Mount Pleasant, MI	**W** 14–1 (7)	**Navarra** **(6–2)**	Lovell (2–3)	—	470	31–14	24–5	Box Score	Recap
May 8	1:00 p.m.	CSN Digital	Western Michigan	—	Theunissen Stadium • Mount Pleasant, MI	**L** 2–11	Berg (4–4)	**Mrakitsch** **(3–1)**	—	376	31–15	24–6	Box Score	Recap
May 10	3:00 p.m.	CSN Digital	Oakland*	—	Theunissen Stadium • Mount Pleasant, MI	**W** 4–3	**Insco** **(1–1)**	Deans (0–1)	**Jones** **(6)**	131	32–15	—	Box Score	Recap
May 13	4:00 p.m.	—	at Eastern Michigan	—	Oestrike Stadium • Ypsilanti, MI	**W** 7–1	**Patty** **(6–3)**	House (1–7)	—	318	33–15	25–6	Box Score	Recap
May 14	1:00 p.m.	—	at Eastern Michigan	—	Oestrike Stadium • Ypsilanti, MI	**W** 10–4 (7)	**Taylor** **(8–3)**	Volkers (1–4)	—	252	34–15	26–6	Box Score	Recap
May 14	4:00 p.m.	—	at Eastern Michigan	—	Oestrike Stadium • Ypsilanti, MI	**W** 7–2	**Insco** **(2–1)**	Chittum (1–3)	**Mrakitsch** **(1)**	252	35–15	27–6	Box Score	Recap
May 15	1:00 p.m.	—	at Eastern Michigan	—	Oestrike Stadium • Ypsilanti, MI	**W** 8–3	**Navarra** **(7–2)**	Fruit (4–5)	—	368	36–15	28–6	Box Score	Recap
May 19	3:00 p.m.	CSN Digital	Toledo	—	Theunissen Stadium • Mount Pleasant, MI	**L** 2–4	Jones (7–3)	**Patty** **(6–4)**	McAninch (6)	292	36–16	28–7	Box Score	Recap
May 20	12:00 p.m.	CSN Digital	Toledo	—	Theunissen Stadium • Mount Pleasant, MI	**W** 8–2 (7)	**Navarra** **(8–2)**	Dillon (0–2)	—	276	37–16	29–7	Box Score	Recap
May 20	3:00 p.m.	CSN Digital	Toledo	—	Theunissen Stadium • Mount Pleasant, MI	**W** 7–6	**Mrakitsch** **(4–1)**	McCune (2–2)	**Taylor** **(1)**	276	38–16	30–7	Box Score	Recap
May 21	1:00 p.m.	CSN Digital	Toledo	—	Theunissen Stadium • Mount Pleasant, MI	**Cancelled** due to rain. Despite 3 innings being played, the minimum 5 inning requirement was not met so the result and any statistics were not counted.								Recap

Postseason (5–3)

MAC tournament (4–1)
Date	Time (ET)	TV	Opponent	(Seed)	Stadium	Score	Win	Loss	Save	Attendance	Overall record	Tournament record	Box Score	Recap
May 25	11:00 a.m.	ESPN+	vs. (3) Toledo	(2)	Ball Diamond • Muncie, IN	**W** 11–10	**Navarra** **(9–2)**	Brandon (7–5)	—	286	39–16	1–0	Box Score	Recap
May 27	1:45 p.m.	ESPN+	at (1) Ball State	(2)	Ball Diamond • Muncie, IN	**L** 7–9	Schweitzer (11–2)	**Patty** **(6–5)**	—	409	39–17	1–1	Box Score	Recap
May 28	10:30 a.m.	ESPN+	vs. (3) Toledo	(2)	Ball Diamond • Muncie, IN	**W** 10–7	**Mrakitsch** **(5–1)**	McAninch (3–3)	—	126	40–17	2–1	Box Score	Recap
May 28	2:30 p.m.	ESPN+	at (1) Ball State	(2)	Ball Diamond • Muncie, IN	**W** 12–3	**Navarra** **(10–2)**	Dohm (4–3)	**Palmblad** **(3)**	536	41–17	3–1	Box Score	Recap
May 29	12:00 p.m.	ESPN+	at (1) Ball State; Tournament championship Game	(2)	Ball Diamond • Muncie, IN	**W** 11–7	**Mrakitsch** **(6–1)**	Klein (4–3)	—	689	42–17	4–1	Box Score	Recap

NCAA Gainesville Regional (1–2)
Date	Time (ET)	TV	Opponent	(Seed) Rank	Stadium	Score	Win	Loss	Save	Attendance	Overall record	Regional Record	Box Score	Recap
June 3	6:30 p.m.	ESPN+	vs. (1) No. 13 Florida	(4)	Condron Ballpark • Gainesville, FL	3–7	Sproat (9–4)	**Taylor** **(8–4)**	Slater (6)	5,472	42–18	1–0	Box Score	Recap
June 4	1:00 p.m.	ESPN+	vs. (4) Liberty	(4)	Condron Ballpark • Gainesville, FL	3–2^{12}	**Mrakitsch** **(7–1)**	Hungate (2–1)	—	2,907	43–18	1–1	Box Score	Recap
June 5	1:00 p.m.	SECN	vs. (1) No. 13 Florida	(4)	Condron Ballpark • Gainesville, FL	5–6	Slater (6–3)	**Navarra** **(10–3)**	—	3,350	43–19	1–2	Box Score	Recap

* indicates a non-conference game. All regular season rankings from D1Baseball on the date of the contest. All NCAA tournament rankings are based on top 16 national seeding done by NCAA Selection Committee. Source:

Schedule Notes

== Postseason ==
=== MAC tournament ===
MAC tournament teams
(1) Ball State Cardinals	(2) Central Michigan Chippewas	(3) Toledo Rockets	(4) Ohio Bobcats

Upper round 1
1	Ball State	6
4	Ohio	4
2	Central Michigan	11
3	Toledo	10
Lower round 1
3	Toledo	13
4	Ohio	5

Upper final
1	Ball State	9
2	Central Michigan	7
Lower final
2	Central Michigan	10
3	Toledo	7

Final
1	Ball State	3	7
2	Central Michigan	12	11

=== NCAA tournament ===
==== Gainesville Regional ====
Gainesville Regional Teams
(1) Florida Gators	(2) Oklahoma Sooners	(3) Liberty Flames	(4) Central Michigan Chippewas

First Round
1	Florida	7
4	Central Michigan	3
3	Liberty	3
2	Oklahoma	16
Lower round 1
3	Liberty	2
4	Central Michigan	3^{12}

Semi-Finals
1	Florida	4
2	Oklahoma	9
Lower final
1	Florida	6
4	Central Michigan	5

Final
2	Oklahoma	2	5
1	Florida	7	4
