= 2022 Ball State Cardinals baseball team =

2022 Ball State Cardinals baseball

MAC regular season champion
- Conference: Mid-American Conference
- Record: 38–17 (32–7 MAC)
- Head coach: Rich Maloney (10th season)
- Home stadium: Ball Diamond

2022 Mid-American Conference baseball standings
	Conf.				Overall
Team	W		L	PCT	W		L	PCT
Ball State ‍†‍‍	32	–	7	.821	40	–	19	.678
Central Michigan ‍‍‡‍^{y}	30	–	7	.811	42	–	17	.712
Toledo ‍‍‍	23	–	16	.590	33	–	25	.569
Ohio ‍‍‍	21	–	15	.583	30	–	24	.556
Kent State ‍‍‍	19	–	19	.500	24	–	29	.453
Miami (OH) ‍‍‍	18	–	22	.450	23	–	33	.411
Eastern Michigan ‍‍‍	16	–	24	.400	22	–	34	.393
Western Michigan ‍‍‍	15	–	24	.385	18	–	36	.333
Bowling Green ‍‍‍	14	–	24	.368	18	–	35	.340
Northern Illinois ‍‍‍	13	–	25	.342	14	–	40	.259
Akron ‍‍‍	11	–	29	.275	15	–	41	.268
† – Conference champion ‡ – Tournament champion y – Invited to the NCAA tournament Rankings from D1Baseball

The 2022 Ball State Cardinals baseball team represented Ball State University during the 2022 NCAA Division I baseball season. The Cardinals played their home games at the Ball Diamond as a member of the Mid-American Conference They were led by head coach Rich Maloney, in his tenth year as manager.

Ball State won the MAC regular season championship for the first time in program history.

== Personnel ==
=== Roster ===
2022 Ball State Cardinals baseball team
Players
Coaches

#	Pos.	Name	B/T	Height	Weight	Year	Home town
			/	—	—
			/	—	—
			/	—	—
			/	—	—
			/	—	—
			/	—	—
			/	—	—
			/	—	—
			/	—	—
			/	—	—

Head coach

Assistant coach(es)

Legend

- (C) Team captain
- (S) Suspended
- (I) Ineligible
- Injured
- Current redshirt

== Schedule and results ==
2022 Ball State Cardinals baseball game log (–)
Regular season (–)

February (2–6)
Date	Opponent	Rank	Site/stadium	Score	Win	Loss	Save	TV	Attendance	Overall record	MAC record
Swig and Swine College Classic (2–2)
February 18	vs. Bucknell*		Detyens Field; Charleston, South Carolina	**W** 8–7	**Jake Lewis (1–0)**	Graeme Carroll (0–1)	**Sam Klein (1)**		75	1–0	—
February 19 (Note: Game 1 of doubleheader.)	vs. Iowa*		Detyens Field	**L** 1–11	Brody Brecht (1–0)	**Tyler Schweitzer (0–1)**	—		132	1–1	—
February 19 (Note: Game 2 of doubleheader.)	vs. Air Force*		Detyens Field	**L** 0–9	Seungmin Shim (1–0)	**Nate Dohm (0–1)**	—		286	1–2	—
February 20	vs. Army*		Detyens Field	**W** 10–6	**Andre Orselli (1–0)**	Sean Dennehy (0–1)	—		304	2–2	—
February 25	at UNCW*		Brooks Field; Wilmington, North Carolina	**L** 0–2	Matt Gaither (1–0)	**Tyler Schweitzer (0–2)**	Hunter Hodges (1)	FloSports	1,019	2–3	—
Carolinas Coastline Classic (0–3)
February 26	vs. Middle Tennessee*		Springs Brooks Stadium; Conway, South Carolina	**L** 0–1	Zach Keenan (1–0)	**Trennor O'Donnell (0–1)**	—		901	2–4	—
February 27	at Coastal Carolina*		Springs Brooks Stadium	**L** 2–7	Mike Knorr (1–0)	**Ty Johnson (0–1)**	—	ESPN+	1,101	2–5	—
February 28	at Coastal Carolina*		Springs Brooks Stadium	**L** 6–9	Matt Joyce (2–0)	**Sam Klein (0–1)**	Jack Billings (2)	ESPN+	948	2–6	—

March (12–2)
Date	Opponent	Rank	Site/stadium	Score	Win	Loss	Save	TV	Attendance	Overall record	MAC record
March 4	at Florida A&M*		Moore–Kittles Field; Tallahassee, Florida	**W** 6–3	**Tyler Schweitzer (1–2)**	DJ Wilkinson (1–2)	**Sam Klein (2)**		206	3–6	—
March 5	at Florida A&M*		Moore–Kittles Field	**W** 7–4	**Trennor O'Donnell (1–1)**	Hunter Viets (1–1)	Maxwell McKee (1)		250	4–6	—
March 5	at Florida A&M*		Moore–Kittles Field	**W** 6–1	**Ty Johnson (1–1)**	Dallas Tease (0–2)	—		250	5–6	—
March 6	at Florida A&M*		Moore–Kittles Field	**L** 3–5	Shawn Host (1–2)	**Ty Weatherly (0–1)**	Ben Krizen (3)		250	5–7	—
March 13	Eastern Michigan		Ball Diamond; Muncie, Indiana	**W** 2–1	**Tyler Schweitzer (2–2)**	Zach Fruit (0–2)	**Sam Klein (3)**		206	6–7	1–0
March 13	Eastern Michigan		Ball Diamond	**W** 6–4	**Ty Johnson (2–1)**	Dom Anderson (0–1)	**Sam Klein (4)**		315	7–7	2–0
March 14	Eastern Michigan		Ball Diamond	**L** 2–4	Adam Falinski (2–2)	**Trennor O'Donnell (1–2)**	—		157	7–8	2–1
March 14	Eastern Michigan		Ball Diamond	**W** 11–8	**Casey Bargo (1–0)**	Zach Gillig (0–1)	**Sam Klein (5)**		197	8–8	3–1
March 19	Bowling Green		Ball Diamond	**W** 17–1				ESPN+		9–8	4–1
March 20	Bowling Green		Ball Diamond	**W** 14–9				ESPN+		10–8	5–1
March 20	Bowling Green		Ball Diamond	**W** 15–5^{7}				ESPN+		11–8	6–1
March 21	Bowling Green		Ball Diamond	**W** 9–4				ESPN+		12–8	6–1
March 26	at Western Michigan		Hyames Field; Kalamazoo, Michigan	**Postponed (inclement weather). Make-up date March 28.**							
March 27	at Western Michigan		Hyames Field	**Postponed (inclement weather). Make-up date April 19.**							
March 27	at Western Michigan		Hyames Field	**Postponed (inclement weather). Make-up date April 27.**							
March 28 (Note: March 28 game against Western Michigan was played as a doubleheader due to inclement weather on March 26 and 27.)	at Western Michigan		Hyames Field	**W** 2–0				WKZO		13–8	7–1
March 28	at Western Michigan; Rescheduled from March 26		Hyames Field	**W** 12–5^{8}				WKZO		14–8	8–1

April (–)
Date	Opponent	Rank	Site/stadium	Score	Win	Loss	Save	TV	Attendance	Overall record	MAC record
April 1	at Toledo		Scott Park; Toledo, Ohio					ESPN3			
April 2	at Toledo		Scott Park					ESPN3			
April 2	at Toledo		Scott Park					ESPN3			
April 3	at Toledo		Scott Park					ESPN3			
April 8	at No. 21 Oregon*		PK Park; Eugene, Oregon					P12NOR			
April 9	at No. 21 Oregon*		PK Park					P12NOR			
April 9	at No. 21 Oregon*		PK Park					P12NOR			
April 10	at No. 21 Oregon*		PK Park					P12NOR			
April 15	Akron		Ball Diamond								
April 16	Akron		Ball Diamond								
April 16	Akron		Ball Diamond								
April 17	Akron		Ball Diamond								
April 19	at Western Michigan; Rescheduled from March 27		Hyames Field								
Bronze Stalk Series
April 23	at Northern Illinois		Ralph McKinzie Field; DeKalb, Illinois								
April 24	at Northern Illinois		Ralph McKinzie Field								
April 24	at Northern Illinois		Ralph McKinzie Field								
April 25	at Northern Illinois		Ralph McKinzie Field								
April 27 (Note: Game 4 against Western Michigan was not rescheduled a second time.)	at Western Michigan; Rescheduled from March 27		Hyames Field	**Cancelled (inclement weather).**							
April 29	Central Michigan		Ball Diamond								
April 30	Central Michigan		Ball Diamond								
April 30	Central Michigan		Ball Diamond								

May (–)
Date	Opponent	Rank	Site/stadium	Score	Win	Loss	Save	TV	Attendance	Overall record	MAC record
May 1	Central Michigan		Ball Diamond								
May 7	at Kent State		Schoonover Stadium; Kent, Ohio								
May 8	at Kent State		Schoonover Stadium								
May 8	at Kent State		Schoonover Stadium								
May 9	at Kent State		Schoonover Stadium								
May 13	Ohio		Ball Diamond					ESPN+			
May 14	Ohio		Ball Diamond					ESPN+			
May 14	Ohio		Ball Diamond					ESPN+			
May 15	Ohio		Ball Diamond					ESPN+			
May 19	at Miami (OH)		McKie Field; Oxford, Ohio								
May 20	at Miami (OH)		McKie Field								
May 20	at Miami (OH)		McKie Field								
May 21	at Miami (OH)		McKie Field								

Postseason (2–1)

MAC Tournament (2–1)
Date	Opponent	Seed	Site/stadium	Score	Win	Loss	Save	TV	Attendance	Overall record	MACT Record
May 25 (Note: The MAC Tournament game vs. Toledo began on May 25 but was suspended in the first inning due to severe weather. The game resumed on May 26.)	(4) Toledo; Quarterfinals	(1)	Ball Diamond	**W** 6–4	**Sam Klein (4–2)**	Brett Manis (4–3)	—	ESPN+	425	39–17	1–0
May 27	(2) Central Michigan; Semifinals	(1)	Ball Diamond	**W** 9–7	**Tyler Schweitzer (11–2)**	Jordan Patty (6–5)	—	ESPN+	409	40–17	2–0
May 28	(2) Central Michigan; Finals – Game 1	(1)	Ball Diamond	**L** 3–12	Garrett Navarra (10–2)	**Nate Dohm (4–3)**	Ryan Palmblad (3)	ESPN+	536	40–18	2–1
May 29	(2) Central Michigan; Finals – Game 2	(1)	Ball Diamond					ESPN+			

Legend: = Win = Loss = Canceled
Bold = Ball State team member * = Non-conference game
Rankings are based on the team's current ranking in the D1Baseball poll.

Schedule Notes

== Tournaments ==
=== MAC Tournament ===
MAC tournament teams
(1) Ball State Cardinals	(2) Central Michigan Chippewas	(3) Toledo Rockets	(4) Ohio Bobcats

Upper round 1
1	Ball State	6
4	Ohio	4
2	Central Michigan	11
3	Toledo	10
Lower round 1
3	Toledo	13
4	Ohio	5

Upper final
1	Ball State	9
2	Central Michigan	7
Lower final
2	Central Michigan	10
3	Toledo	7

Final
1	Ball State	3	7
2	Central Michigan	12	11
