= Mitch Maier =

American baseball player & coach (born 1982)

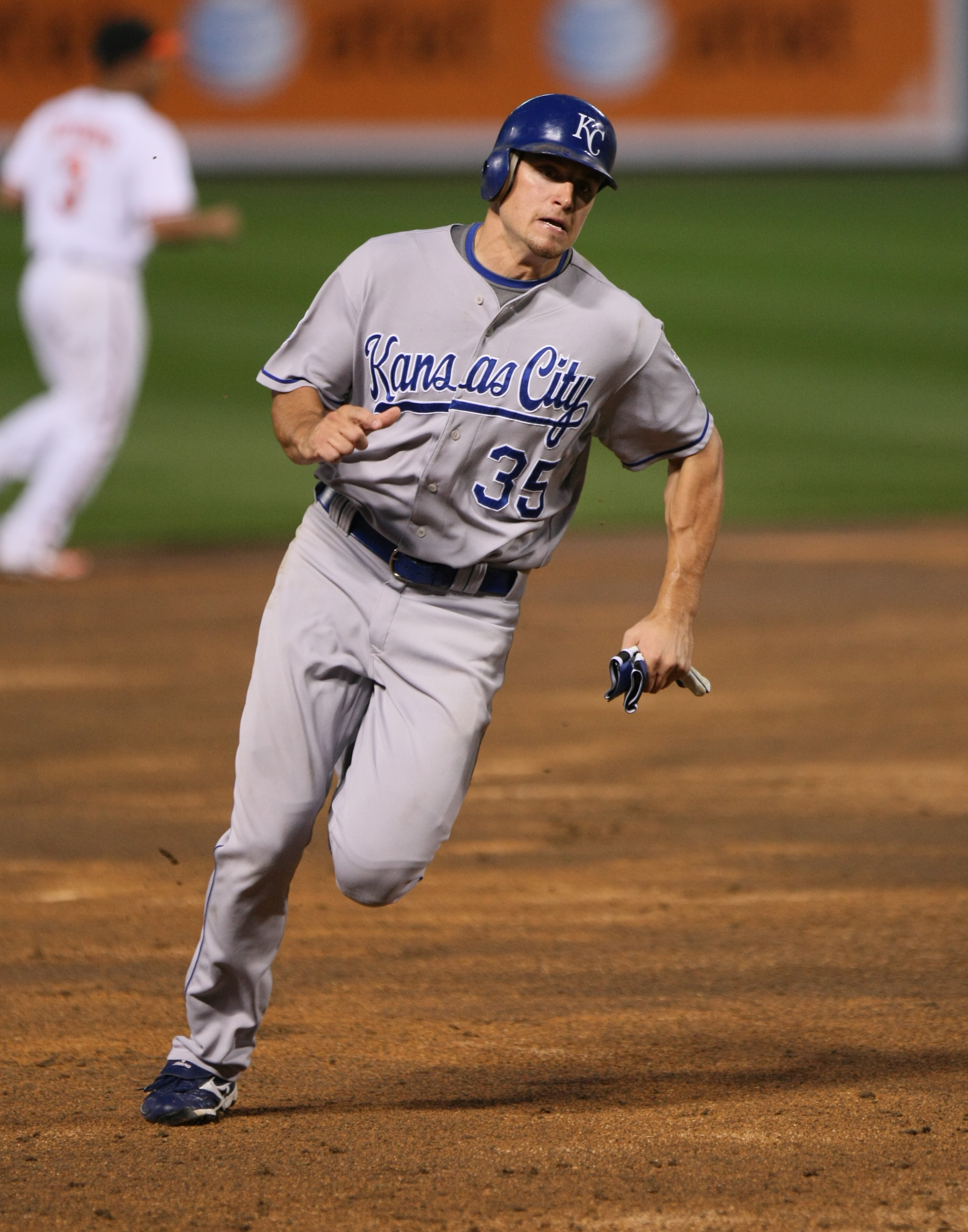
- Maier with the Kansas City Royals
- Outfielder
- Born: June 30, 1982 (age 44); Petoskey, Michigan, U.S.
- Batted: Left Threw: Right

MLB debut
- September 23, 2006, for the Kansas City Royals

Last appearance
- June 30, 2012, for the Kansas City Royals

MLB statistics
- Batting average: .248
- Home runs: 10
- Runs batted in: 93
- Stats at Baseball Reference

Teams
- Kansas City Royals (2006, 2008–2012)

Mitchell William Maier (born June 30, 1982) is an American former professional baseball outfielder, coach, and front office executive who currently serves as the director of baseball operations for the Kansas City Royals of Major League Baseball (MLB). He played in MLB for the Royals in 2006, and from 2008 to 2012.

== Amateur career ==
Maier was born in Petoskey, Michigan, attended Novi High School after high school played college baseball at the University of Toledo. In 2002, he played collegiate summer baseball with the Harwich Mariners of the Cape Cod Baseball League and was named a league all-star. As a junior catcher in 2003, Maier set school records with a batting average of .448, 87 hits and 61 runs batted in and tied school records with 16 doubles and 29 stolen bases. Despite this, he lost out on Mid-American Conference Baseball Player of the Year honors to Ball State's Brad Snyder.

== Professional career ==
=== Kansas City Royals ===
Maier was drafted by the Kansas City Royals with the 30th overall selection of the 2003 Major League Baseball draft.

Maier began his professional career in 2003 with the rookie-level Arizona League Royals as a catcher. He played in 51 games, batted .350 and hit two home runs. In 2004, Maier was converted over to third base. He played for two Single-A teams in 2004, the Burlington Bees and the Wilmington Blue Rocks. In 2005, Maier was converted to another position again, this time to the outfield, due to the presence of third base prospect Mark Teahen in the organization. He played for the Single-A High Desert Mavericks in 2005 and also played for the Double-A Wichita Wranglers.

In 2006, Maier began the year at Double-A. He was named to the Texas League midseason All-Star team. He finished the minor league season with a .306 batting average and had 14 home runs in 138 games. Following the Wranglers elimination in the playoff finals, Maier was promoted to the major league club on September 20, 2006. He made his major league debut on September 23. In 5 games for the Royals during his rookie campaign, Maier went 2-for-13 (.154) with 2 walks.

In 2007, Maier played the entirety of the season for the Triple-A Omaha Royals. In 140 appearances for Omaha, he batted .279/.320/.428 with 14 home runs and 62 RBI. In 34 games for Kansas City in 2008, Maier batted .286/.316/.319 with no home runs and nine RBI. He made 127 appearances for the team during the 2009 season, hitting .243/.333/.331 with three home runs, 31 RBI, and nine stolen bases.

Maier made 117 appearances for the Royals in 2010, slashing .263/.333/.375 with five home runs, 39 RBI, and three stolen bases. Maier made his Major League pitching debut as the 8th Royals position player to pitch in a game on July 26, 2011, against the Boston Red Sox in Fenway Park. He pitched a scoreless inning, but gave up a double to David Ortiz. In 44 total games for the Royals in 2011, Maier batted .232/.345/.337 with no home runs, seven RBI, and one stolen base.

Maier played in 32 games for Kansas City in 2012, hitting .172/.260/.313 with two home runs, seven RBI, and two stolen bases. On July 4, 2012, Maier was designated for assignment by the Royals. He cleared waivers and was sent outright to Omaha on July 14. In 38 games for Omaha, Maier batted .288/.385/.424 with four home runs and 17 RBI. On October 6, he elected free agency.

=== Boston Red Sox ===
On October 31, 2012, Maier signed a minor league contract with the Boston Red Sox. He spent the 2013 campaign with the Triple-A Pawtucket Red Sox, hitting .310/.431/.451 with three home runs and 22 RBI across 31 games. Maier elected free agency following the season on November 4, 2013.

=== Kansas City Royals (second stint) ===
On December 19, 2013, Maier signed a minor league contract with the Chicago Cubs. He was released prior to the start of the season on March 6, 2014.

On May 1, 2014, Maier signed a minor league contract with the Kansas City Royals. In 25 games for the Double-A Northwest Arkansas Naturals, he batted .233/.303/.389 with three home runs and eight RBI.

On January 10, 2015, Maier re-signed with the Royals on a minor league contract. He spent the year transitioning into a coaching role, and did not play for the organization. On January 18, 2016, Maier once more re-signed with Kansas City on a minor league contract. He was released on March 31.

== Coaching career ==
Maier became a coach during the 2015 season with the Royals, working as an outfield / base running coordinator in the organization. He served as interim first base coach in 2017, and was promoted to the full-time role prior to the 2018 season.

Maier was named the Royals director of baseball operations on December 3, 2019.
