= Rich Maloney =

American college baseball coach (born 1964)

- Maloney in 2011

Current position
- Title: Head coach
- Team: Ball State
- Conference: Mid-American

Biographical details
- Born: September 23, 1964 (age 61); Roseville, Michigan, U.S.

Playing career
- 1984–1986: Western Michigan
- 1986: Pulaski Braves
- 1987: Sumter Braves
- 1987–1990: Durham Bulls
- 1990–1991: Greenville Braves
- Positions: Shortstop, Second Baseman, Third Baseman

Coaching career (HC unless noted)
- 1992–1995: Western Michigan (AHC)
- 1996–2002: Ball State
- 2003–2012: Michigan
- 2013–present: Ball State

Head coaching record
- Overall: 1,049–698–2 (.600)
- Tournaments: NCAA: 6–11

Accomplishments and honors

Championships
- 3x Big Ten Conference Regular Season; 2x Big Ten Conference Tournament; 5x Mid-American Conference Regular Season; 1x Mid-American ConferenceTournament; 6x Mid-American Conference West Division; 5x NCAA Regional Appearances; 1x Regional Championship

Awards
- 4x Mid-American Conference Coach of the Year (1998, 2001, 2014, 2022); 2x Big Ten Conference Coach of the Year (2007, 2008); 2x Region Coach of the Year (2007, 2008); ABCA/Dave Keilitz Ethics in Coaching Award (2022); FCA Jerry Kindall Award (2017); Winningest Baseball Coach in Ball State History; As Player: 2x First-team All-MAC; 2x All-district Squad; Third team All-American; Western Michigan Hall of Fame; Roseville Michigan High School Hall of Fame; Roseville Michigan High School No.1 Retired

Richard Allen Maloney (born September 23, 1964) is an American college baseball coach and the current head coach at Ball State, a position he has held since the 2013 season. He previously served as the head coach of the Michigan Wolverines, where he compiled a 341–244 record over ten seasons (2003–2012). During his tenure at Michigan, he secured three Big Ten regular-season titles and two Big Ten tournament titles. Maloney led the Wolverines to four consecutive NCAA tournament appearances from 2005 to 2008 and was named the Big Ten Coach of the Year in both 2007 and 2008.

Prior to his time at Michigan, Maloney served as the head coach at Ball State from 1996 to 2002. He was named the MAC Coach of the Year in 1998 and 2001, as the Cardinals finished first in the MAC West for four consecutive seasons (1998–2001) and captured three regular-season titles. Following his return to Ball State in 2013, he has led the program to two additional MAC West titles, two regular-season titles, and earned Coach of the Year honors in 2014 and 2022. In 2023, he guided the Cardinals to their first MAC tournament title since 2006.

== Head coaching record ==
The following table details Rich Maloney's year-by-year record as an NCAA Division I head baseball coach.

Record table
Season	Team	Overall	Conference	Standing	Postseason
Ball State Cardinals (Mid-American Conference) (1996–2002)
1996	Ball State	32–20–1	16–14	T–5th	
1997	Ball State	40–19	21–10	2nd	MAC Tournament
1998	Ball State	39–18	23–8	1st (West)	MAC Tournament
1999	Ball State	42–18	25–6	1st (West)	MAC Tournament
2000	Ball State	34–23	18–8	T–1st (West)	MAC Tournament
2001	Ball State	35–23	21–5	1st (West)	MAC Tournament
2002	Ball State	34–23	17–9	2nd (West)	MAC Tournament
Ball State:					
Michigan Wolverines (Big Ten Conference) (2003–2012)
2003	Michigan	30–27	16–14	3rd	Big Ten Tournament
2004	Michigan	34–26	19–13	T–3rd	Big Ten Tournament
2005	Michigan	42–19	17–12	T–4th	Atlanta Regional
2006	Michigan	43–21	23–9	1st	Atlanta Regional
2007	Michigan	42–19	21–7	1st	Corvallis Super Regional
2008	Michigan	46–14	26–5	1st	Ann Arbor Regional
2009	Michigan	30–25	9–15	7th	
2010	Michigan	35–22	14–10	2nd	Big Ten tournament
2011	Michigan	17–37	7–16	10th	
2012	Michigan	22–34	8–16	10th	
Michigan:		341–244 (.583)	160–117 (.578)		
Ball State Cardinals (Mid-American Conference) (2013–present)
2013	Ball State	31–24	15–12	2nd (West)	MAC tournament
2014	Ball State	39–18	22–4	1st (West)	MAC tournament
2015	Ball State	33–25	14-13	T-3rd (West)	MAC tournament
2016	Ball State	32-26	15-9	1st (West)	MAC tournament
2017	Ball State	30–28	14–10	T-2nd (West)	MAC tournament
2018	Ball State	32–26	17–10	T-2nd	MAC tournament
2019	Ball State	38–19	20–5	2nd	MAC tournament
2020	Ball State	7–9	0–0		Season canceled due to COVID-19
2021	Ball State	38–18	29–11	2nd	No Conference Tournament Held in 2021
2022	Ball State	40–19	32–7	1st	MAC tournament
2023	Ball State	36–23	19-11	T–2nd	NCAA Lexington Regional
2024	Ball State	35-23-1	18-12	3rd	MAC tournament
2025	Ball State	36–22	21–9	2nd	MAC tournament
2026	Ball State	25–30	18–15	6th	MAC tournament
Ball State:		708–454–2 (.609)	395–188 (.678)		
Total:		1,049–698–2 (.600)			
National champion Postseason invitational champion Conference regular season champion Conference regular season and conference tournament champion Division regular season champion Division regular season and conference tournament champion Conference tournament champion

== Draft picks: first rounders ==
Throughout his career at Michigan and Ball State, Maloney coached 70 players who were selected a total of 77 times in the MLB Draft. This includes six first-round picks—all produced during his tenure at Ball State. Notably, Maloney coached the 2002 top overall pick, Bryan Bullington, marking the first time in MAC history that a player in any sport was selected number one overall.

Pick	Player	Team	Position	Year
41	Jeff Urban	San Francisco Giants	LHP	1998
21	Larry Bigbie	Baltimore Orioles	OF	1999
1	Bryan Bullington	Pittsburgh Pirates	RHP	2002
32	Luke Hagerty	Chicago Cubs	LHP	2002
18	Brad Snyder	Cleveland Indians	OF	2003
34	Drey Jameson	Arizona Diamondbacks	RHP	2019

== Played in majors ==
Coach Maloney has mentored 16 players from Ball State and Michigan who have gone on to reach the Major Leagues.

- Bryan Bullington
- Larry Bigbie
- Brad Snyder (baseball)
- Jake Fox
- Chris Getz
- Clayton Richard
- Zach Putnam
- Ryan LaMarre
- Zach Plesac
- Drey Jameson
- Kyle Nicolas
- Alex Call
- Chayce McDermott
- Sam McConnell
- Zach Cole
- Tyler Schweitzer

== Player awards ==
Under Coach Maloney's leadership at Michigan and Ball State, his players have earned:

- 6 Conference Players of the Year
- 8 Conference Pitchers of the Year
- 7 Conference Freshman Players/Pitchers of the Year
- 4 Conference Defensive Players of the Year
- 4 Conference Tournament MVPs
- 1 ABCA/Rawlings National Gold Glove Winner (Awarded to the single best defensive player at his position in the country)
- 1 National Freshman Pitcher of the Year

== Head coaching tree ==
Head coaches that coached under Maloney throughout his career at Michigan and Ball State:

NCAA Division I Head Coaches

- Jake Boss Jr. – Michigan State (2009–Present); formerly Eastern Michigan (2008)
- Jeff Mercer – Indiana (2019–Present); formerly Wright State (2017–2018)
- Blake Beemer – Butler (2023–Present)
- Jason Murray – Charleston Southern (2005–2008)

Non-Division I & Community College Head Coaches

- Matt Husted – Wheaton College (2013–Present)
- Ray Skjold – Post University (2019–Present)
- Bob Keller – Mississippi Gulf Coast CC (2022–2025)
- Nick Caruso – Macomb Community College (2025–Present)
- Matt Howard – IU Kokomo (2018–2021)
- Dustin Glant – Anderson University (2016)
