= Rob Reinstetle =

American college baseball coach (born 1976)

Current position
- Title: Head coach
- Team: Toledo
- Conference: MAC
- Record: 144–161

Biographical details
- Born: June 28, 1976 (age 49)

Playing career
- 1995–1997: Okaloosa-Walton Community College
- 1999: Ohio Dominican

Coaching career (HC unless noted)
- 2000–2001: Ohio Dominican (assistant)
- 2002: Cincinnati (assistant)
- 2003: Okaloosa-Walton Community College (assistant)
- 2004–2005: College of Charleston (assistant)
- 2006: South Alabama (assistant)
- 2007–2009: Ole Miss (assistant)
- 2016–2019: Western Kentucky (assistant)
- 2020–present: Toledo

Head coaching record
- Overall: 144–161

Rob Reinstetle (born June 28, 1976) is an American college baseball coach and former player. He is the head baseball coach at the University of Toledo. Reinstetle played college baseball at Ohio Dominican University in 1999.

== Playing career ==
Reinstetle enrolled at Okaloosa-Walton Community College, to play college baseball for the Okaloosa-Walton Raiders baseball team. After graduating with an associate degree from Okaloosa-Walton, Reinstetle transferred to Ohio Dominican University. As a senior in 1999, he hit .280 with 1 home run and 16 RBIs.

== Coaching career ==
On July 1, 2005, Reinstetle was named an assistant at the University of South Alabama.

On December 11, 2009, he resigned from his position at Ole Miss.

On June 30, 2015, Reinstetle returned to coaching baseball as an assistant at Western Kentucky.

On July 8, 2019, Reinstetle was hired as head baseball coach at the University of Toledo.

== Head coaching record ==
Record table
Season	Team	Overall	Conference	Standing	Postseason
Toledo Rockets (Mid-American Conference) (2020–present)
2020	Toledo	3–13	0–0		Season canceled due to COVID-19
2021	Toledo	23–33	21–19	5th	
2022	Toledo	33–25	23–16	3rd	MAC Tournament
2023	Toledo	26–29	14–16	6th	
2024	Toledo	27–32	16–15	6th	MAC Tournament
2025	Toledo	32–29	17–13	5th	MAC Tournament
Toledo:		144–161	91–79		
Total:		144–161			
National champion Postseason invitational champion Conference regular season champion Conference regular season and conference tournament champion Division regular season champion Division regular season and conference tournament champion Conference tournament champion

== See also ==
- List of current NCAA Division I baseball coaches
