= 2022 Mid-American Conference baseball tournament =

American collegiate baseball tournament

- Teams: 4
- Format: Double-elimination
- Finals site: Ball Diamond; Muncie, Indiana
- Champions: Central Michigan (4th title)
- Winning coach: Jordan Bischel (2nd title)
- MVP: Garrett Navarra (CMU)
- Television: ESPN+

2022 Mid-American Conference baseball standings
	Conf.				Overall
Team	W		L	PCT	W		L	PCT
Ball State ‍†‍‍	32	–	7	.821	40	–	19	.678
Central Michigan ‍‍‡‍^{y}	30	–	7	.811	42	–	17	.712
Toledo ‍‍‍	23	–	16	.590	33	–	25	.569
Ohio ‍‍‍	21	–	15	.583	30	–	24	.556
Kent State ‍‍‍	19	–	19	.500	24	–	29	.453
Miami (OH) ‍‍‍	18	–	22	.450	23	–	33	.411
Eastern Michigan ‍‍‍	16	–	24	.400	22	–	34	.393
Western Michigan ‍‍‍	15	–	24	.385	18	–	36	.333
Bowling Green ‍‍‍	14	–	24	.368	18	–	35	.340
Northern Illinois ‍‍‍	13	–	25	.342	14	–	40	.259
Akron ‍‍‍	11	–	29	.275	15	–	41	.268
† – Conference champion ‡ – Tournament champion y – Invited to the NCAA tournament Rankings from D1Baseball

The 2022 Mid-American Conference baseball tournament was held from May 25 through 29. The top four regular season finishers of the league's eleven teams met in the double-elimination tournament to be held at Ball Diamond in Muncie, Indiana, the home field of Ball State who finished 2022 with the highest regular season winning percentage. Second-seeded Central Michigan won the tournament and earned the conference's automatic bid to the 2022 NCAA Division I baseball tournament.

== Seeding and format ==
The top four teams were seeded according conference winning percentage. Teams then played a double-elimination tournament.

Team	W–L	Pct	GB	Seed
Ball State	32–7	.821	–	1
Central Michigan	30–7	.811	1	2
Toledo	23–16	.590	9	3
Ohio	21–15	.583	9.5	4
Kent State	19–19	.500	12.5	-
Miami	18–22	.450	14.5	-
Eastern Michigan	16–24	.400	16.5	-
Western Michigan	15–24	.385	17	-
Bowling Green	14–24	.368	17.5	-
Northern Illinois	13–25	.342	18.5	-
Akron	11–29	.275	21.5	-

== Results ==
MAC tournament teams
(1) Ball State Cardinals	(2) Central Michigan Chippewas	(3) Toledo Rockets	(4) Ohio Bobcats

Upper round 1
1	Ball State	6
4	Ohio	4
2	Central Michigan	11
3	Toledo	10
Lower round 1
3	Toledo	13
4	Ohio	5

Upper final
1	Ball State	9
2	Central Michigan	7
Lower final
2	Central Michigan	10
3	Toledo	7

Final
1	Ball State	3	7
2	Central Michigan	12	11

== Schedule ==
Game	Time*	Matchup^{#}	Score	Television	Attendance
Wednesday, May 25
1	11:00 a.m.	No. 2 Central Michigan vs. No. 3 Toledo	11-10	ESPN+	286
Thursday, May 26
2	4:00 p.m.	No. 1 Ball State vs. No. 4 Ohio	6-4	ESPN+	425
Friday, May 27
3	9:00 a.m.	No. 3 Toledo vs. No. 4 Ohio; Elimination Game	13-5	ESPN+	117
4	1:45 p.m.	No. 1 Ball State vs. No. 2 Central Michigan	9-7	ESPN+	409
Saturday, May 28
5	10:30 a.m.	No. 2 Central Michigan vs. No. 3 Toledo; Elimination Game	10-7	ESPN+	126
6	3:15 p.m.	No. 1 Ball State vs. No. 2 Central Michigan	3-12	ESPN+	536
Sunday, May 29
7	12:00 p.m.	No. 1 Ball State vs. No. 2 Central Michigan	7-11	ESPN+	689
*Game times in EDT. # – Rankings denote tournament seed.

== Conference championship ==
MAC Championship
(2) Central Michigan Chippewas	vs.	(1) Ball State Cardinals

May 29, 2022, 12:00 p.m. (EDT) at Ball Diamond in Muncie, Indiana
Team	1	2	3	4	5	6	7	8	9	R	H	E
(2) Central Michigan	1	1	0	0	0	2	3	2	2	11	17	2
(1) Ball State	5	0	0	0	1	0	1	0	0	7	12	2
WP: Adam Mrakitsch (6–1) LP: Sam Klein (4–3); Home runs: CMU: Mario Camilletti, Garrett Navarra, Robby Morgan IV; Ball: None; Attendance: 689

== All-Tournament Team ==
The following players were named to the All-Tournament Team.

Name	School
Garret Pike	Toledo
Mason Sykes	Toledo
Scott Mackiewicz	Toledo
Ryan Peltier	Ball State
Tyler Schweitzer	Ball State
Zach Cole	Ball State
Garrett Navarra (MVP)	Central Michigan
Robby Morgan IV	Central Michigan
Jakob Marsee	Central Michigan
Adam Markitsch	Central Michigan
