= Brad Snyder =

Brad or Bradley Snyder may refer to:

- Brad Snyder (baseball) (born 1982), American baseball player
- Bradley Snyder (shot putter) (born 1976), Canadian shot put athlete
- Brad Snyder (As the World Turns), a character on soap opera As The World Turns
- Brad Snyder (swimmer) (born 1984), American Paralympics swimmer
