= 2022 Middle Tennessee Blue Raiders baseball team =

Baseball team season

2022 Middle Tennessee Blue Raiders baseball
- Conference: Conference USA
- Record: 29–26 (17–13 C-USA)
- Head coach: Jim Toman
- Assistant coaches: Jerry Meyers; Jordan Getzelman
- Home stadium: Reese Smith Jr. Field

2022 Conference USA baseball standings
	Conf.						Overall
Team	W		L		T	PCT	W		L		T	PCT
No. 15 Southern Miss ‍†‍‍^{y}	23	–	7	–	0	.767	43	–	16	–	0	.729
Louisiana Tech ‍‍‡‍^{y}	20	–	10	–	0	.667	42	–	19	–	0	.689
Old Dominion ‍‍‍	19	–	11	–	0	.633	41	–	17	–	0	.707
Florida Atlantic ‍‍‍	19	–	11	–	0	.633	35	–	23	–	0	.603
UTSA ‍‍‍	19	–	11	–	0	.633	38	–	20	–	0	.655
Middle Tennessee ‍‍‍	17	–	13	–	0	.567	29	–	26	–	0	.527
Charlotte ‍‍‍	17	–	13	–	0	.567	36	–	22	–	0	.621
UAB ‍‍‍	13	–	17	–	0	.433	31	–	25	–	0	.554
Rice ‍‍‍	9	–	21	–	0	.300	17	–	39	–	0	.304
Marshall ‍‍‍	9	–	21	–	0	.300	20	–	34	–	1	.373
FIU ‍‍‍	8	–	22	–	0	.267	16	–	34	–	0	.320
Western Kentucky ‍‍‍	7	–	23	–	0	.233	18	–	36	–	0	.333
† – Conference champion ‡ – Tournament champion y – Invited to the NCAA tournament Rankings from D1Baseball

The 2022 Middle Tennessee Blue Raiders baseball team represented the Middle Tennessee State University in the sport of baseball for the 2022 college baseball season. The Blue Raiders competed in Division I of the National Collegiate Athletic Association (NCAA) and in Conference USA. They played their home games at Reese Smith Jr. Field in Murfreesboro, Tennessee. The team was coached by Jim Toman, who was in his fourth season with the Blue Raiders.

== Preseason ==
=== C-USA media poll ===
The Conference USA preseason poll was released on February 16, 2022 with the Blue Raiders predicted to finish in tenth place in the conference.

Media poll
Predicted finish	Team	1st Place Votes
1	Southern Miss	6
2	Louisiana Tech	2
3	Old Dominion	1
4	Charlotte	4
5	Florida Atlantic	-
6	UTSA	-
7	FIU	1
8	Rice	-
9	Western Kentucky	-
10	Middle Tennessee	-
11	UAB	-
12	Marshall	-

== Personnel ==
2022 Middle Tennessee Blue Raiders baseball team
Players
Coaches

#	Pos.	Name	B/T	Height	Weight	Year	Home town
1	OF	Brian Dillingham	R/R	5 ft 10 in (1.78 m)	195 lb (88 kg)	Sr	Bradenton, Florida
3	OF	Bryce Symlar	R/R	5 ft 10 in (1.78 m)	185 lb (84 kg)	So	Columbia, Tennessee
4	INF	Fausto Lopez	R/R	5 ft 8 in (1.73 m)	175 lb (79 kg)	Sr	Brooklyn, New York
6	LHP	Trent Seibert	L/L	6 ft 2 in (1.88 m)	190 lb (86 kg)	Sr	Fuquay-Varina, North Carolina
7	OF	Luke Vinson	L/L	6 ft 1 in (1.85 m)	175 lb (79 kg)	So	Murfreesboro, Tennessee
8	INF	Gabe Jennings	R/R	6 ft 2 in (1.88 m)	190 lb (86 kg)	So	Lebanon, Tennessee
9	OF	Nathan Sanders	L/L	6 ft 0 in (1.83 m)	200 lb (91 kg)	Sr	Smyrna, Tennessee
10	OF	Tatsunori Negishi	L/L	5 ft 11 in (1.8 m)	190 lb (86 kg)	So	Tokyo, Japan
11	INF	JT Mabry	R/R	6 ft 0 in (1.83 m)	170 lb (77 kg)	Jr	Chesterfield, Missouri
12	RHP	Eriq Swan	R/R	6 ft 6 in (1.98 m)	240 lb (109 kg)	So	Murfreesboro, Tennessee
13	INF	Brett Coker	R/R	6 ft 1 in (1.85 m)	215 lb (98 kg)	Jr	Hendersonville, Tennessee
14	RHP	Brycen Thomas	R/R	6 ft 4 in (1.93 m)	225 lb (102 kg)	Sr	Spring Hill, Tennessee
15	RHP	Jackson Marbet	L/R	6 ft 4 in (1.93 m)	205 lb (93 kg)	Fr	Columbia, Tennessee
16	OF	Jackson Galloway	R/R	6 ft 2 in (1.88 m)	190 lb (86 kg)	So	Kansas City, Missouri
17	RHP	Zach Keenan	R/R	6 ft 6 in (1.98 m)	225 lb (102 kg)	Sr	Suwanee, Georgia
18	C	Nick Jones	R/R	5 ft 10 in (1.78 m)	230 lb (104 kg)	Jr	Coal City, Illinois
19	INF	Jacob Williams	R/R	6 ft 3 in (1.91 m)	205 lb (93 kg)	So	Forest, Virginia
20	RHP	Jack Julian	R/R	6 ft 4 in (1.93 m)	225 lb (102 kg)	Fr	Hixson, Tennessee
21	INF	Ryan Maher	R/R	6 ft 0 in (1.83 m)	195 lb (88 kg)	So	Chicago, Illinois
22	INF	Bryson Trammell	L/R	6 ft 4 in (1.93 m)	195 lb (88 kg)	Fr	Knoxville, Tennessee
23	C	Mason Speirs	R/R	5 ft 11 in (1.8 m)	215 lb (98 kg)	Sr	Westminster, Colorado
24	RHP	DJ Wright	R/R	6 ft 5 in (1.96 m)	220 lb (100 kg)	Sr	Murfreesboro, Tennessee
26	LHP	Charlie Mac Toman	R/L	5 ft 11 in (1.8 m)	180 lb (82 kg)	So	Columbia, South Carolina
27	RHP	Jaden Hamm	R/R	6 ft 1 in (1.85 m)	190 lb (86 kg)	So	Culleoka, Tennessee
28	LHP	Peyton Wigginton	L/L	6 ft 4 in (1.93 m)	200 lb (91 kg)	Sr	Franklin, Tennessee
29	RHP	Dustin Sprong	R/R	6 ft 3 in (1.91 m)	175 lb (79 kg)	So	Morgantown, Indiana
30	INF	Wyatt Morgan	L/R	5 ft 11 in (1.8 m)	205 lb (93 kg)	So	Lenexa, Kansas
31	LHP	John Tomlinson	L/L	6 ft 3 in (1.91 m)	175 lb (79 kg)	Fr	Lebanon, Tennessee
32	RHP	Daniel Dewey	R/R	6 ft 3 in (1.91 m)	195 lb (88 kg)	Fr	Murfreesboro, Tennessee
33	C	Mason McLeod	L/R	6 ft 4 in (1.93 m)	205 lb (93 kg)	So	Greensburg, Indiana
34	RHP	Justin Goldstein	R/R	6 ft 3 in (1.91 m)	180 lb (82 kg)	So	Tustin, California
35	OF	Jacob Wright	L/L	6 ft 2 in (1.88 m)	185 lb (84 kg)	Fr	Murfreesboro, Tennessee
38	C	Briggs Rutter	R/R	6 ft 2 in (1.88 m)	205 lb (93 kg)	So	Perkiomenville, Pennsylvania
39	C	Carter Edge	R/R	6 ft 2 in (1.88 m)	190 lb (86 kg)	So	Chattanooga, Tennessee
40	C	Jared Vetetoe	L/R	6 ft 2 in (1.88 m)	190 lb (86 kg)	Fr	Gallatin, Tennessee
41	INF	KB Peralta	R/R	5 ft 8 in (1.73 m)	170 lb (77 kg)	So	Lawrence, Massachusetts
42	RHP	Jalen Wirtz	R/R	6 ft 4 in (1.93 m)	205 lb (93 kg)	Fr	Gallatin, Tennessee
43	RHP	James Sells	R/R	6 ft 1 in (1.85 m)	180 lb (82 kg)	Fr	Winchester, Tennessee
45	INF	Eston Snider	R/R	5 ft 9 in (1.75 m)	170 lb (77 kg)	Fr	Franklin, Tennessee
47	RHP	Braden Jones	R/R	6 ft 4 in (1.93 m)	180 lb (82 kg)	So	Knoxville, Tennessee
48	RHP	Ryan Cagle	R/R	6 ft 6 in (1.98 m)	235 lb (107 kg)	Fr	South Pittsburg, Tennessee
49	RHP	Brayden Siren	R/R	6 ft 11 in (2.11 m)	256 lb (116 kg)	So	Murfreesboro, Tennessee
51	RHP	Avery Gunn	R/R	6 ft 4 in (1.93 m)	205 lb (93 kg)	Fr	Dickson, Tennessee
52	INF	Austin Baal	L/L	6 ft 4 in (1.93 m)	235 lb (107 kg)	Jr	Palmyra, Pennsylvania

Head coach

Jim Toman (NC State)

Assistant coach(es)

Jerry Meyers (Iowa State)
Jordan Getzelman (Iowa Western)
Forrest Arnold (Coker)

Legend

- (C) Team captain
- (S) Suspended
- (I) Ineligible
- Injured
- Current redshirt

Roster
Last update: 5 August 2022

== Schedule and results ==
2022 Middle Tennessee Blue Raiders baseball game log
Regular season (29–24)

February (3–5)
Date	Opponent	Rank	Site/stadium	Score	Win	Loss	Save	TV	Attendance	Overall record	C-USA record
Feb. 18	vs. St. John's		Brooks Field • Wilmington, NC	W 3–2^{10}	Hamm (1-0)	Cunningham (0-1)	Swan (1)		200	1–0	
Feb. 18	at UNC Wilmington		Brooks Field • Wilmington, NC	L 4–6	Hodges (1-0)	Seibert (0-1)	None		1,186	1–1	
Feb. 19	vs. St. John's		Brooks Field • Wilmington, NC	L 5–6	Johnson (1-0)	Sells (0-1)	Rodriguez (1)		200	1–2	
Feb. 20	at UNC Wilmington		Brooks Field • Wilmington, NC	L 4–8	Taylor (1-0)	Thomas (0-1)	None		1,080	1–3	
Feb. 23	at Belmont		E. S. Rose Park • Nashville, TN	L 1–11^{11}	Lamberth (1-0)	Seibert (0-2)	None		54	1–4	
The Carolinas Coastline Classic
Feb. 25	vs. Illinois		Springs Brooks Stadium • Conway, SC	L 4–7	Kirschsieper (1-0)	Wigginton (0-1)	Rybarczyk (1)		855	1–5	
Feb. 26	vs. Ball State		Springs Brooks Stadium • Conway, SC	W 1–0	Keenan (1-0)	O'Donnell (0-1)	None		901	2–5	
Feb. 26	vs. Illinois		Springs Brooks Stadium • Conway, SC	W 17–10	Hamm (2-0)	Siefken (0-1)	None		923	3–5	

March (8–8)
Date	Opponent	Rank	Site/stadium	Score	Win	Loss	Save	TV	Attendance	Overall record	C-USA record
Mar. 1	Lipscomb		Reese Smith Jr. Field • Murfreesboro, TN	L 0–3	Thompson (2-0)	Hamm (2-1)	Nordmann (1)		1,175	3–6	
Mar. 2	vs. Western Carolina		AT&T Field • Chattanooga, TN	W 10–5	Wigginton (1-1)	Corn (1-1)	None		150	4–6	
Mar. 4	at South Alabama		Eddie Stanky Field • Mobile, AL	L 1–3	Smith (2-0)	Keenan (1-1)	Wood (2)		1,120	4–7	
Mar. 5	at South Alabama		Eddie Stanky Field • Mobile, AL	L 3–16	Boswell (2-1)	Swan (0-1)	None		1,175	4–8	
Mar. 6	at South Alabama		Eddie Stanky Field • Mobile, AL	L 2–4	Booker (1-0)	Wigginton (1-2)	Boyd (2)		1,073	4–9	
Mar. 8	at Alabama		Sewell–Thomas Stadium • Tuscaloosa, AL	Game cancelled							
Mar. 11	at Auburn		Plainsman Park • Auburn, AL	W 10–8	Seibert (1-2)	Armstrong (1-1)	None		2,867	5–9	
Mar. 13	at Auburn		Plainsman Park • Auburn, AL	L 7–10	Sheehan (1-0)	Swan (0-2)	Burkhalter (3)		3,146	5–10	
Mar. 13	at Auburn		Plainsman Park • Auburn, AL	W 4–3	Wigginton (2-2)	Swilling (0-2)	None		3,146	6–10	
Mar. 15	Austin Peay		Reese Smith Jr. Field • Murfreesboro, TN	W 7–6	Sells (1-1)	Wellman (0-1)	None		1,150	7–10	
Mar. 18	Old Dominion		Reese Smith Jr. Field • Murfreesboro, TN	L 7–23	Gertner (2-1)	Keenan (1-2)	None		401	7–11	0–1
Mar. 19	Old Dominion		Reese Smith Jr. Field • Murfreesboro, TN	L 3–6	Pantos (4-0)	Swan (0-3)	Dean (4)		502	7–12	0–2
Mar. 20	Old Dominion		Reese Smith Jr. Field • Murfreesboro, TN	W 13–5	Seibert (2-2)	Smith (0-1)	None		550	8–12	1–2
Mar. 22	at Austin Peay		Raymond C. Hand Park • Clarksville, TN	Game postponed							
Mar. 25	at UAB		Regions Field • Birmingham, AL	W 1–0	Keenan (2-2)	Reynolds (1-2)	Wigginton (1)		201	9–12	2–2
Mar. 26	at UAB		Regions Field • Birmingham, AL	W 6–3	Swan (1-3)	O'Clair (1-1)	Hamm (1)		345	10–12	3–2
Mar. 27	at UAB		Regions Field • Birmingham, AL	L 5–6^{10}	Taylor (1-0)	Hamm (2-2)	None		304	10–13	3–3
Mar. 29	at Tennessee Tech		Bush Stadium at Averitt Express Baseball Complex • Cookeville, TN	W 8–4	Sells (2-1)	Gannaway (2-2)	None		266	11–13	

April (10–6)
Date	Opponent	Rank	Site/stadium	Score	Win	Loss	Save	TV	Attendance	Overall record	C-USA record
Apr. 1	Western Kentucky		Reese Smith Jr. Field • Murfreesboro, TN	W 10–2	Keenan (3-2)	Kates (3-3)	None		445	12–13	4–3
Apr. 2	Western Kentucky		Reese Smith Jr. Field • Murfreesboro, TN	L 3–7	Terbrak (4-1)	Swan (1-4)	Vinyard (5)		425	12–14	4–4
Apr. 3	Western Kentucky		Reese Smith Jr. Field • Murfreesboro, TN	W 5–1	Wigginton (3-2)	Hellman (0-4)	None		525	13–14	5–4
Apr. 6	Memphis		Reese Smith Jr. Field • Murfreesboro, TN	Game postponed							
Apr. 8	at Marshall		Kennedy Center Field • Huntington, WV	L 7–11	Purnell (4-2)	Keenan (3-3)	None		50	13–15	5–5
Apr. 10	at Marshall		Kennedy Center Field • Huntington, WV	W 3–1^{7}	Swan (2-4)	Copen (1-2)	Hamm (2)		75	14–15	6–5
Apr. 10	at Marshall		Kennedy Center Field • Huntington, WV	W 5–2^{7}	Wigginton (4-2)	Addkison (0-2)	None		75	15–15	7–5
Apr. 12	at Lipscomb		Dugan Field • Nashville, TN	W 7–0	Julian (1-0)	Kantola (1-4)	None		377	16–15	
Apr. 14	Charlotte		Reese Smith Jr. Field • Murfreesboro, TN	W 4–3^{11}	Wigginton (5-2)	Bruce (1-2)	None		525	17–15	8–5
Apr. 15	Charlotte		Reese Smith Jr. Field • Murfreesboro, TN	L 5–10	Sims (2-1)	Swan (2-5)	None		415	17–16	8–6
Apr. 16	Charlotte		Reese Smith Jr. Field • Murfreesboro, TN	W 10–7	Hamm (3-2)	Giesting (1-4)	None		515	18–16	9–6
Apr. 19	Belmont		Reese Smith Jr. Field • Murfreesboro, TN	W 3–1	Julian (2-0)	Hubbell (0-2)	Seibert (1)		475	19–16	
Apr. 22	at Louisiana Tech		J. C. Love Field at Pat Patterson Park • Ruston, LA	W 7–3	Keenan (4-3)	Gibson (4-1)	None		2,755	20–16	10–6
Apr. 23	at Louisiana Tech		J. C. Love Field at Pat Patterson Park • Ruston, LA	L 2–4	Jennings (3-1)	Wigginton (5-3)	Crigger (8)		2,494	20–17	10–7
Apr. 24	at Louisiana Tech		J. C. Love Field at Pat Patterson Park • Ruston, LA	W 6–3^{12}	Seibert (3-2)	Crigger (3-2)	None		2,259	21–17	11–7
Apr. 26	UT Martin		Reese Smith Jr. Field • Murfreesboro, TN	Game cancelled							
Apr. 29	UTSA		Reese Smith Jr. Field • Murfreesboro, TN	L 2–13	Garza (2-0)	Keenan (4-4)	None		547	21–18	11–8
Apr. 30	UTSA		Reese Smith Jr. Field • Murfreesboro, TN	L 4–12	Malone (7-1)	Wigginton (5-4)	None		589	21–19	11–9

May (8–5)
Date	Opponent	Rank	Site/stadium	Score	Win	Loss	Save	TV	Attendance	Overall record	C-USA record
May 1	UTSA		Reese Smith Jr. Field • Murfreesboro, TN	W 2–1	Seibert (4-2)	Beaird (2-2)	None		510	22–19	12–9
May 4	at Georgia State		Georgia State Baseball Complex • Decatur, GA	W 9–7	Thomas (1-1)	Watson (1-3)	None		245	23–19	
May 6	at FIU		Infinity Insurance Park • Miami, FL	L 4–5^{11}	Tiburcio (3-3)	Seibert (4-3)	None		377	23–20	12–10
May 7	at FIU		Infinity Insurance Park • Miami, FL	W 5–1	Hamm (4-2)	Lequerica (2-4)	None		350	24–20	13–10
May 8	at FIU		Infinity Insurance Park • Miami, FL	W 11–5	Sells (3-1)	Puk (1-1)	None		280	25–20	14–10
May 10	Tennessee Tech		Reese Smith Jr. Field • Murfreesboro, TN	W 8–4	Wirtz (1-0)	Gannaway (3-3)	None		1,256	26–20	
May 13	at Rice		Reckling Park • Houston, TX	W 7–0	Wigginton (6-4)	Shaw (2-2)	None		3,783	27–20	15–10
May 14	at Rice		Reckling Park • Houston, TX	W 5–4^{10}	Sells (4-1)	Linskey (0-1)	None		1,879	28–20	16–10
May 15	at Rice		Reckling Park • Houston, TX	W 21–7	Wirtz (2-0)	Perkins (1-1)	None		2,468	29–20	17–10
May 17	at No. 21 Vanderbilt		Hawkins Field • Nashville, TN	L 2–7	Moore (1-0)	Sells (4-2)	None		3,802	29–21	
May 19	No. 17 Southern Miss		Reese Smith Jr. Field • Murfreesboro, TN	L 4–9	Adams (2-1)	Seibert (4-4)	Ramsey (4)		734	29–22	17–11
May 20	No. 17 Southern Miss		Reese Smith Jr. Field • Murfreesboro, TN	L 0–17	Riggins (7-4)	Swan (2-6)	None		751	29–23	17–12
May 21	No. 17 Southern Miss		Reese Smith Jr. Field • Murfreesboro, TN	L 0–10	Waldrep (6-1)	Sells (4-3)	None		532	29—24	17—13

Postseason (0–2)

C-USA Tournament (0–2)
Date	Opponent	(Seed)/Rank	Site/stadium	Score	Win	Loss	Save	TV	Attendance	Overall record	Tournament record
May 25	vs. (3) Old Dominion	(6)	Pete Taylor Park • Hattiesburg, MS	L 7–18	Morgan (8-0)	Seibert (4-5)	None			29–25	0–1
May 26	vs. (7) Charlotte	(6)	Pete Taylor Park • Hattiesburg, MS	L 0–22^{7}	Kramer (4-2)	Wigginton (6-5)	None			29–26	0–2

Legend: = Win = Loss = Cancelled

Schedule source:

*Rankings are based on the team's current ranking in the D1Baseball poll.

== Postseason ==
Accolade	Recipient	Reference
Second Team All-CUSA team	JT Mabry, INF; Jaden Hamm, P Trent Seibert, P	
Freshman All-CUSA team	James Sells, P	
