= Mid-American Conference Baseball Player of the Year =

College sports award

- Awarded for: the most outstanding baseball player in the Mid-American Conference
- Country: United States
- First award: 1986
- Currently held by: Tommy Harrison, Miami

The Mid-American Conference Baseball Player of the Year is an annual award given to the Mid-American Conference's most outstanding baseball player. The award was first given after the 1986 season. As of 2024, Ohio's Rudy Rott is the only two-time winner of the award.

== Winners ==
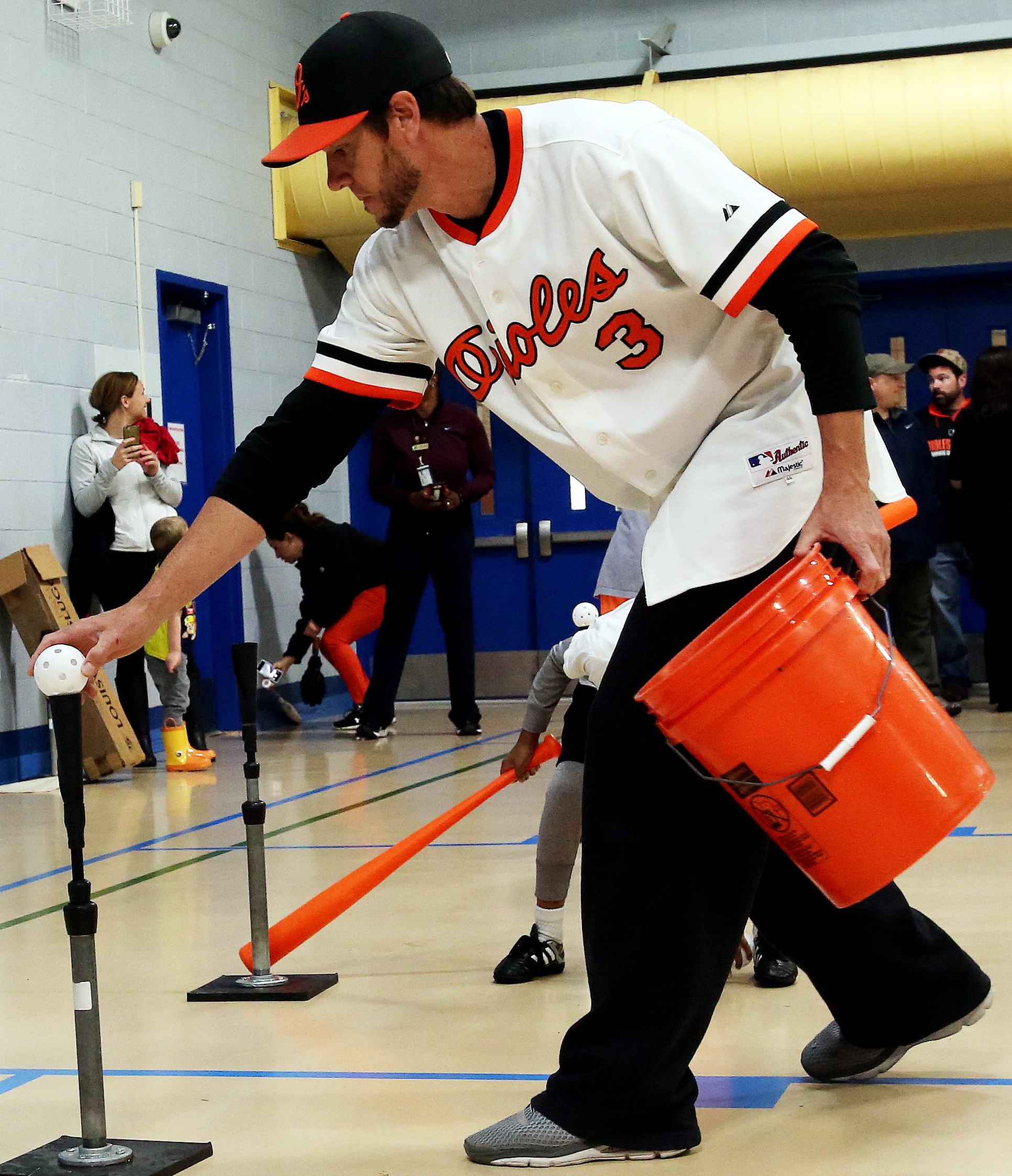
Larry Bigbie was the first of two consecutive Ball State winners in 1999.

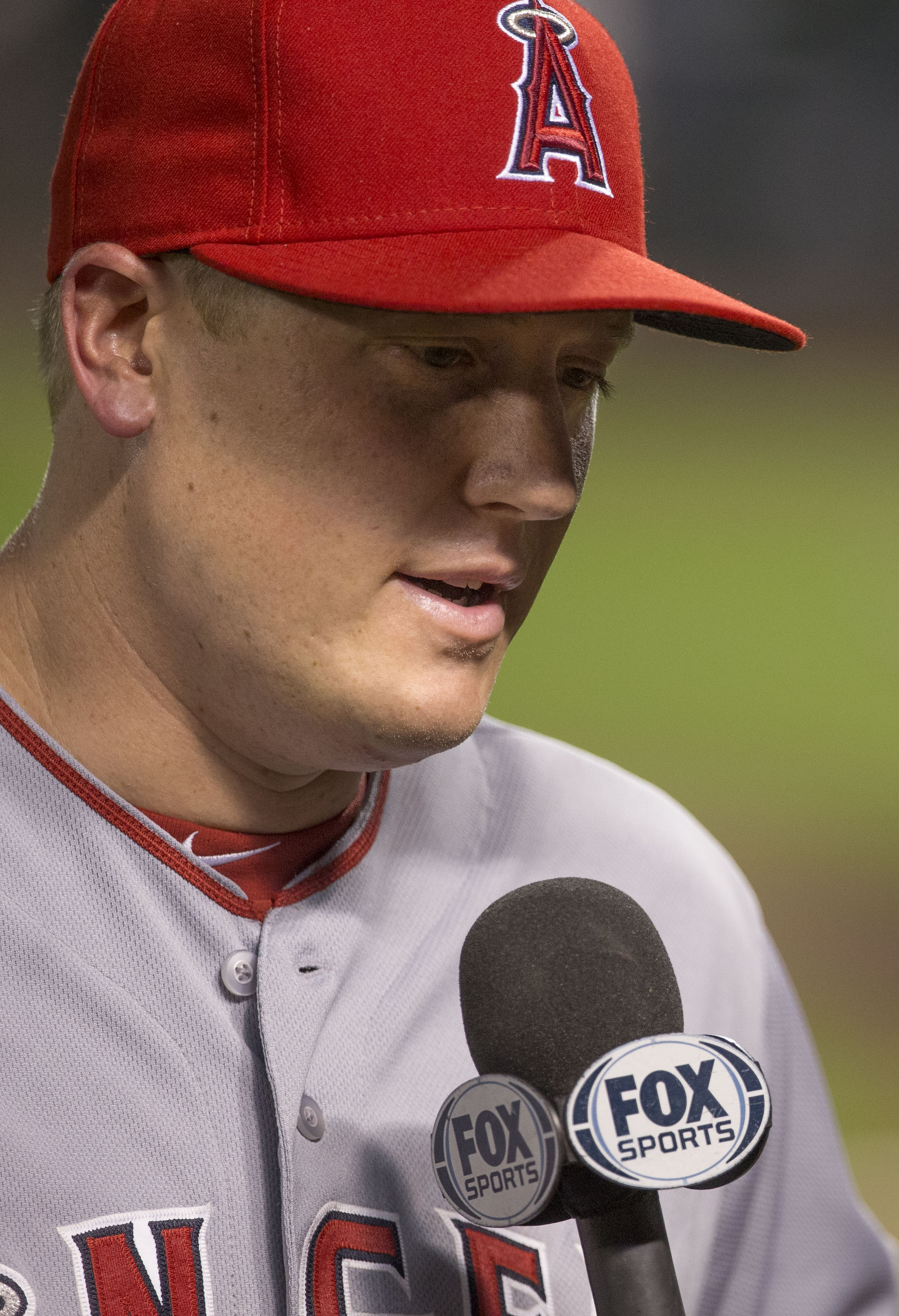
Marc Krauss was the first Ohio player to win the award.

Season	Player	School	Position	Reference
1986	Thomas Howard	Ball State	Outfield	
1987	Dave Bettendorf	Kent State	Third base	
1988	Tim Naehring	Miami	Shortstop	
1989	Clark Huntey	Central Michigan	Catcher	
1990	Denny McNamara	Central Michigan	Outfield	
1991	Scott Conant	Western Michigan	Third base	
1992	Mike Gulan	Kent State	Third base	
1993	Chris Sexton	Miami	Outfield	
1994	Kevin Young	Central Michigan	Third base	
1995	Toby Kominek	Central Michigan	Third base	
1996	Ed Farris	Ball State	First base	
1997	Greg Ryan	Eastern Michigan	First base	
1998	Tom Kuempel	Marshall	First base	
1999	Larry Bigbie	Ball State	Outfield	
2000	Shayne Ridley	Ball State	Shortstop	
2001	John VanBenschoten	Kent State	First base	
2002	Kelly Hunt	Bowling Green	First base	
2003	Brad Snyder	Ball State	Outfield	
2004	Brian Bixler	Eastern Michigan	Shortstop	
2005	Nolan Reimold	Bowling Green	Outfield	
2006	Emmanuel Burriss	Kent State	Shortstop	
2007	Tyler Stovall	Central Michigan	Outfield	
2008	Greg Rohan	Kent State	First base	
2009	Marc Krauss	Ohio	Third base	
2010	Kolbrin Vitek	Ball State	Utility	
2011	Tom Murphy	Buffalo	Catcher	
2012	George Roberts	Kent State	First base	
2013	Jason Kanzler	Buffalo	Outfield	
2014	Sean Godfrey	Ball State	Outfield	
2015	Mitch Longo	Ohio	Outfield	
2016	Alex Call	Ball State	Outfield	
2017	Tanner Allison	Western Michigan	Outfield	
2018	Rudy Rott	Ohio	First base	
2019	Rudy Rott (2)	Ohio	First base	
2021	Chris Meyers	Toledo	First base	
2022	Matt Kirk	Eastern Michigan	Outfield	
2023	Jeron Williams	Toledo	Shortstop	
2024	Nathan Archer	Bowling Green	Outfield	
2025	Hayden Jatczak	Kent State	Third base	
2026	Tommy Harrison	Miami	Ouitfield	

== Winners by school ==
School (year joined)	Winners	Years
Ball State (1973)	8	1986, 1996, 1999, 2000, 2003, 2010, 2014, 2016
Kent State (1951)	7	1987, 1992, 2001, 2006, 2008, 2012, 2025
Central Michigan (1972)	5	1989, 1990, 1994, 1995, 2007
Ohio (1947)	4	2009, 2015, 2018, 2019
Bowling Green (1952)	3	2002, 2005, 2024
Eastern Michigan (1972)	3	1997, 2004, 2022
Miami (1948)	3	1988, 1993, 2026
Buffalo (1999)^{[a]}	2	2011, 2013
Toledo (1951)	2	2021, 2023
Western Michigan (1948)	2	1991, 2017
Marshall (1954/1997)^{[b]}	1	1998
Akron (1992)	0	—
Northern Illinois (1973/1997)^{[c]}	0	—

- ^{a} Buffalo discontinued its baseball program after the 2017 season.
- ^{b} Marshall was a member from 1954 to 1969 and then again from 1997 until 2005.
- ^{c} Northern Illinois was a member from 1973 to 1986, then left until 1997.

== See also ==
- Mid-American Conference Baseball Pitcher of the Year
