= Marc Krauss =

American baseball player (born 1987)

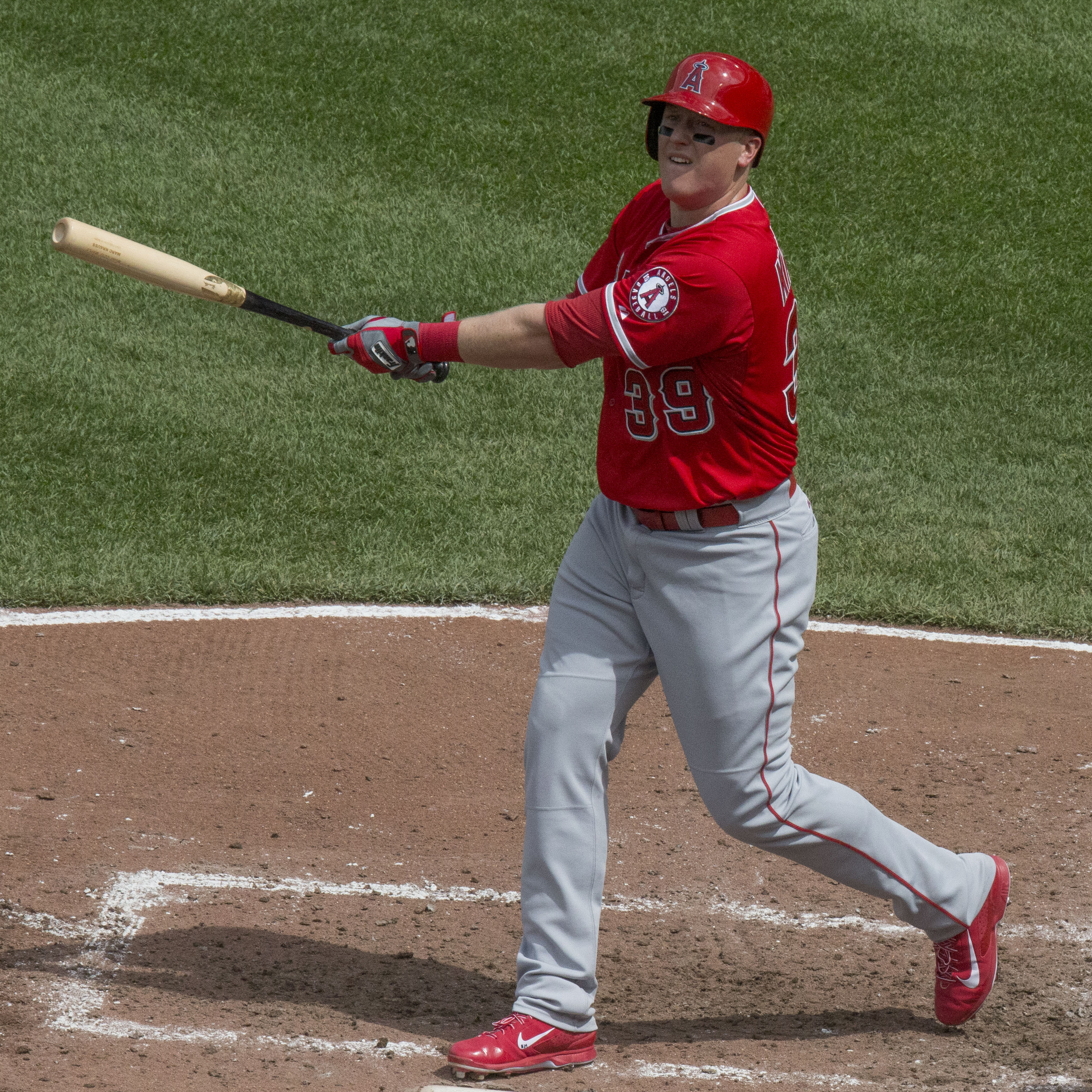
- Krauss with the Los Angeles Angels of Anaheim
- First baseman / Outfielder
- Born: October 5, 1987 (age 38); Deshler, Ohio, U.S.
- Batted: Left Threw: Right

MLB debut
- June 21, 2013, for the Houston Astros

Last MLB appearance
- July 24, 2015, for the Detroit Tigers

MLB statistics
- Batting average: .188
- Home runs: 12
- Runs batted in: 42
- Stats at Baseball Reference

Teams
- Houston Astros (2013–2014); Los Angeles Angels of Anaheim (2015); Tampa Bay Rays (2015); Detroit Tigers (2015)

Marc Stuart Krauss (born October 5, 1987) is an American former professional baseball first baseman and outfielder. He played in Major League Baseball (MLB) for the Houston Astros, Los Angeles Angels of Anaheim, Tampa Bay Rays, and Detroit Tigers.

Krauss played college baseball at Ohio University, where he was named an All-American. He was drafted by the Arizona Diamondbacks in 2009, and was later traded to the Houston Astros in 2012. Krauss made his major league debut with the Astros in 2013.

== Early life ==
Krauss attended Patrick Henry High School in Hamler, Ohio, where he played baseball, American football, and basketball. A wide receiver for the school's football team, he was named All-Ohio three times. He was also named All-Ohio as a catcher for the baseball team.

Despite receiving scholarship offers to play football for the University of Toledo and Bowling Green State University, Krauss decided to pursue baseball. Krauss attended Ohio University, where he played college baseball for the Ohio Bobcats baseball team. In 2007, Krauss was named Mid-American Conference (MAC) Freshman of the Year. In 2008, he played collegiate summer baseball in the Cape Cod Baseball League for the Harwich Mariners and Bourne Braves, and was named a league all-star. In 2009, he was named an All-American and MAC Player of the Year. He set Bobcat records for home runs and slugging percentage.

== Professional career ==
=== Arizona Diamondbacks ===
The Arizona Diamondbacks drafted Krauss in the second round of the 2009 Major League Baseball draft. In his professional debut, Krauss batted .304 in 32 games for the South Bend Silver Hawks of the Single–A Midwest League, before his season ended due to an ankle injury. The Diamondbacks assigned him to the Visalia Rawhide of the High–A California League in 2010.

=== Houston Astros ===
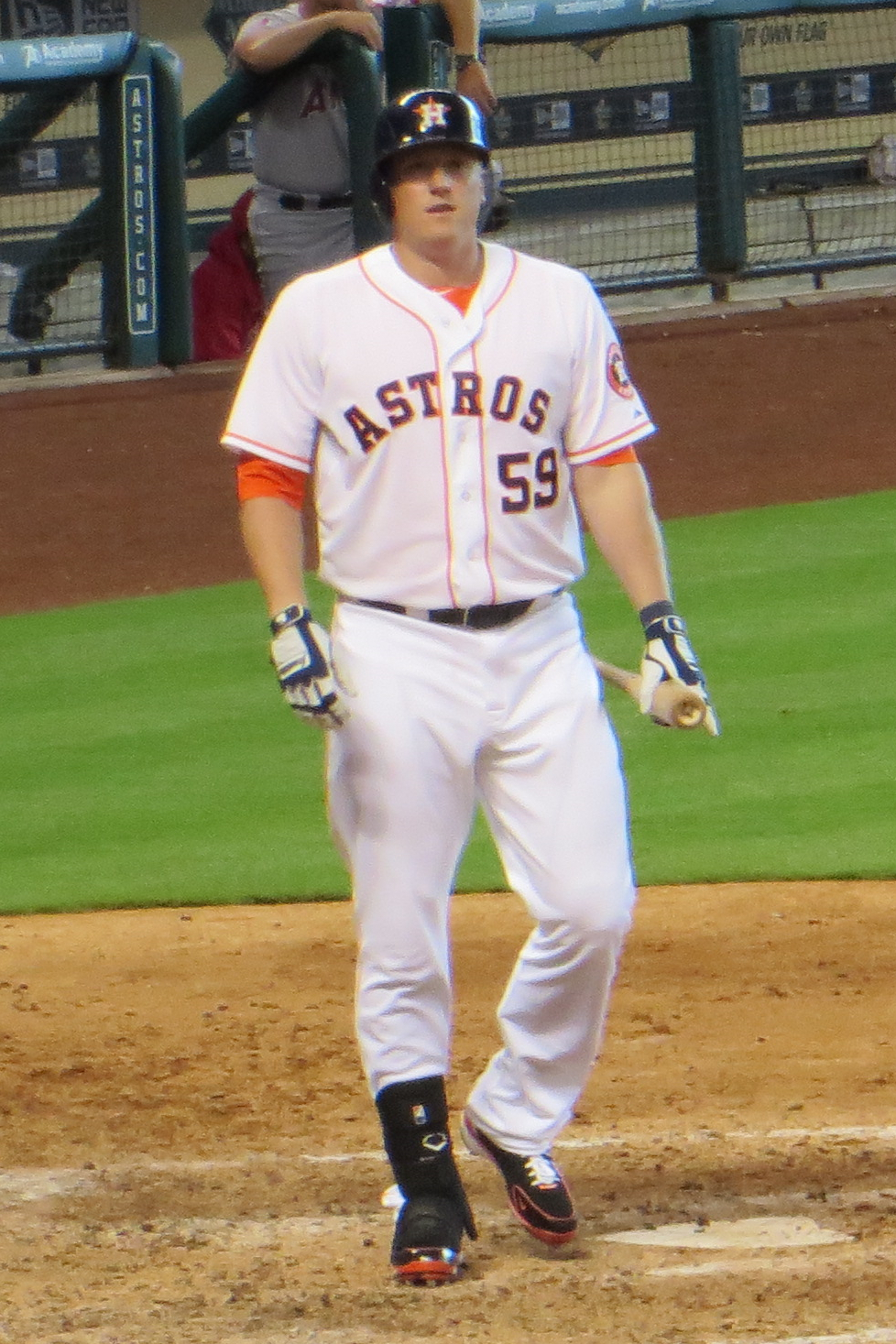
Krauss with the Houston Astros in 2013

On July 29, 2012, the Diamondbacks traded Krauss and Bobby Borchering to the Houston Astros in exchange for Chris Johnson. The Astros assigned Krauss to the Corpus Christi Hooks of the Double–A Texas League. On August 7, the Astros promoted Krauss to the Oklahoma City RedHawks of the Triple–A Pacific Coast League (PCL).

The Astros promoted Krauss to the major leagues for the first time on June 21, 2013. Krauss had his first career runs batted in on a bases-loaded single in a 9–5 victory over the Texas Rangers, on July 6. Krauss hit his first home run on July 7, against Justin Grimm, in a 5–4 loss. Krauss played 52 games that season, finishing the year with a .209 batting average, 4 home runs and 13 runs batted in (RBI).

=== Los Angeles Angels of Anaheim ===
On December 8, 2014, the Los Angeles Angels of Anaheim claimed Krauss off of waivers from the Astros. He was designated for assignment by the Angels on January 8, 2015. Krauss cleared waivers and was sent outright to the Triple–A Salt Lake Bees on January 13. On May 12, the Angels selected Krauss' contract, adding him to their active roster. In 11 games for the Angels, he went 5–for–35 (.143) with one home run and five RBI. Krauss was designated for assignment following the promotion of Alfredo Marte on May 28. He cleared waivers and returned to Salt Lake via outright assignment on May 31.

=== Tampa Bay Rays ===
On June 25, 2015, the Angels traded Krauss to the Tampa Bay Rays in exchange for pitching prospect Kyle Winkler. In four games for Tampa Bay, he went 1–for–10 (.100) with one RBI. Krauss was designated for assignment by the Rays on July 4.

=== Detroit Tigers ===
On July 6, 2015, Krauss was claimed off of waivers by the Detroit Tigers and started the next day. He homered in his first at-bat for the Tigers, exactly two years to the day after his first Major League home run. In 12 games for Detroit, Krauss batted .152/.152/.242 with one home run and two RBI. He was released by the Tigers on August 22.

=== New York Mets ===
On December 14, 2015, Krauss signed a minor league contract with the New York Mets. In 85 games for the Triple–A Las Vegas 51s, he batted .214/.327/.437 with 14 home runs and 39 RBI. Krauss elected free agency following the season on November 7, 2016.

=== Long Island Ducks ===
On April 6, 2017, Krauss signed with the Long Island Ducks of the Atlantic League of Professional Baseball. In 126 games for the Ducks, Krauss slashed .282/.400/.508 with 21 home runs and 84 RBI.

== Personal life ==
Krauss is married to Kelcey Krauss. They had a daughter born in 2013, and another born in 2015.

== See also ==
- 2009 College Baseball All-America Team
