= Chris Sexton =

American baseball player (born 1971)

- Infielder
- Born: August 3, 1971 (age 53); Cincinnati, Ohio, U.S.
- Batted: Right Threw: Right

MLB debut
- May 3, 1999, for the Colorado Rockies

Last MLB appearance
- October 1, 2000, for the Cincinnati Reds

MLB statistics
- Batting average: .220
- Home runs: 1
- Runs batted in: 17
- Stats at Baseball Reference

Teams
- Colorado Rockies (1999); Cincinnati Reds (2000)

Christopher Philip Sexton (born August 3, 1971) is a former Major League Baseball player who played for the Colorado Rockies and the Cincinnati Reds.

== Education ==
Sexton played baseball at St. Xavier High School in Cincinnati. His senior year batting average of .450 set a school record that stood until Jason Basil broke it in 1997. Sexton graduated from St. Xavier in 1989. He attended Miami University on a scholarship. There, he became the second player in RedHawks baseball history to be named the Mid-American Conference Baseball Player of the Year.

== Career ==
Sexton was drafted by the Cincinnati Reds in the tenth round of the 1993 amateur draft, playing for the Billings Mustangs. In 1995, he made it to the big leagues with the Colorado Rockies after being traded for Marcus Moore. He made his debut on May 3, 1999, against the Chicago Cubs. He played in 35 games that year, filling in at center field, left field, right field, second base, and shortstop. The following year, he returned to the Reds and again played in 35 games as a utility infielder.

Sexton retired from baseball in 2003. He lives in Cincinnati.
