= Jake Sabol =

American baseball coach

Current position
- Title: Head coach
- Team: Central Michigan Chippewas
- Conference: MAC

Playing career
- 2007-2011: Central Michigan

Coaching career (HC unless noted)
- 2016-2018: Alma
- 2018-2023: Northwood
- 2023-present: Central Michigan

Jake Sabol is an American college baseball coach. He is currently the head coach for the Central Michigan Chippewas baseball team.

== Early life ==
Sabol is a native of Shelby Township, Michigan. He graduated from De La Salle Collegiate High School in Warren, Michigan in 2006.

== Playing career ==
Sabol earned four letters as a college baseball player at Central Michigan from 2007 to 2011. He was drafted in the 2011 MLB Draft in the 36th round by the Detroit Tigers. A starting pitcher, Sabol also played for the GCL Tigers, Connecticut Tigers, and Traverse City Beach Bums.

== Coaching career ==
Before becoming a head coach, Sabol worked as an associate scout for the Toronto Blue Jays and was a pitching coach at Northwood University.

Sabol was the head coach at NCAA Division III Alma College from 2016 to 2018, leading the program to two of their three best seasons (by wins) in program history.

Prior to coaching at Central Michigan, Sabol coached from 2018 to 2023 at NCAA Division II Northwood University in Midland, Michigan. He was hired in July 2018. While head coach at Northwood, Sabol led the team to a 140-90-1 record and NCAA tournament appearances in all 4 seasons he was there, along with the program’s first Great Midwest Athletic Conference championship.

Sabol was named as head coach of Central Michigan on June 29, 2023. The hiring returned Sabol to his alma mater where he previously played college baseball as he became the 22nd head coach in the 117-year history of Central Michigan baseball.

== See also ==
- List of current NCAA Division I baseball coaches
