= Scott Park Baseball Complex =

Baseball venue in Toledo, Ohio

- Interactive map of Scott Park Baseball Complex
- Location: Parkside Boulevard south of Nebraska Avenue, Toledo, Ohio, USA
- Coordinates: 41.64091°N 83.594855°W
- Owner: University of Toledo
- Operator: University of Toledo
- Capacity: 1,000
- Surface: Natural grass
- Scoreboard: Electronic
- Field size: 330 feet (LF); 400 feet (CF); 330 feet (RF)

Tenant
- Toledo Rockets baseball (MAC)

The Scott Park Baseball Complex is a baseball venue in Toledo, Ohio. It serves as a home field for the Toledo Rockets baseball team, which competes in the NCAA Division I Mid-American Conference. The venue has a capacity of 1,000 spectators. It features stadium lighting, a locker room, dugouts, and a natural grass surface. Its dimensions are 330 feet in left field, 400 feet in center field, and 330 feet in right field.

== See also ==
- List of NCAA Division I baseball venues
