= Theunissen Stadium =

Baseball venue in Mount Pleasant, Michigan

Bill Theunissen Stadium
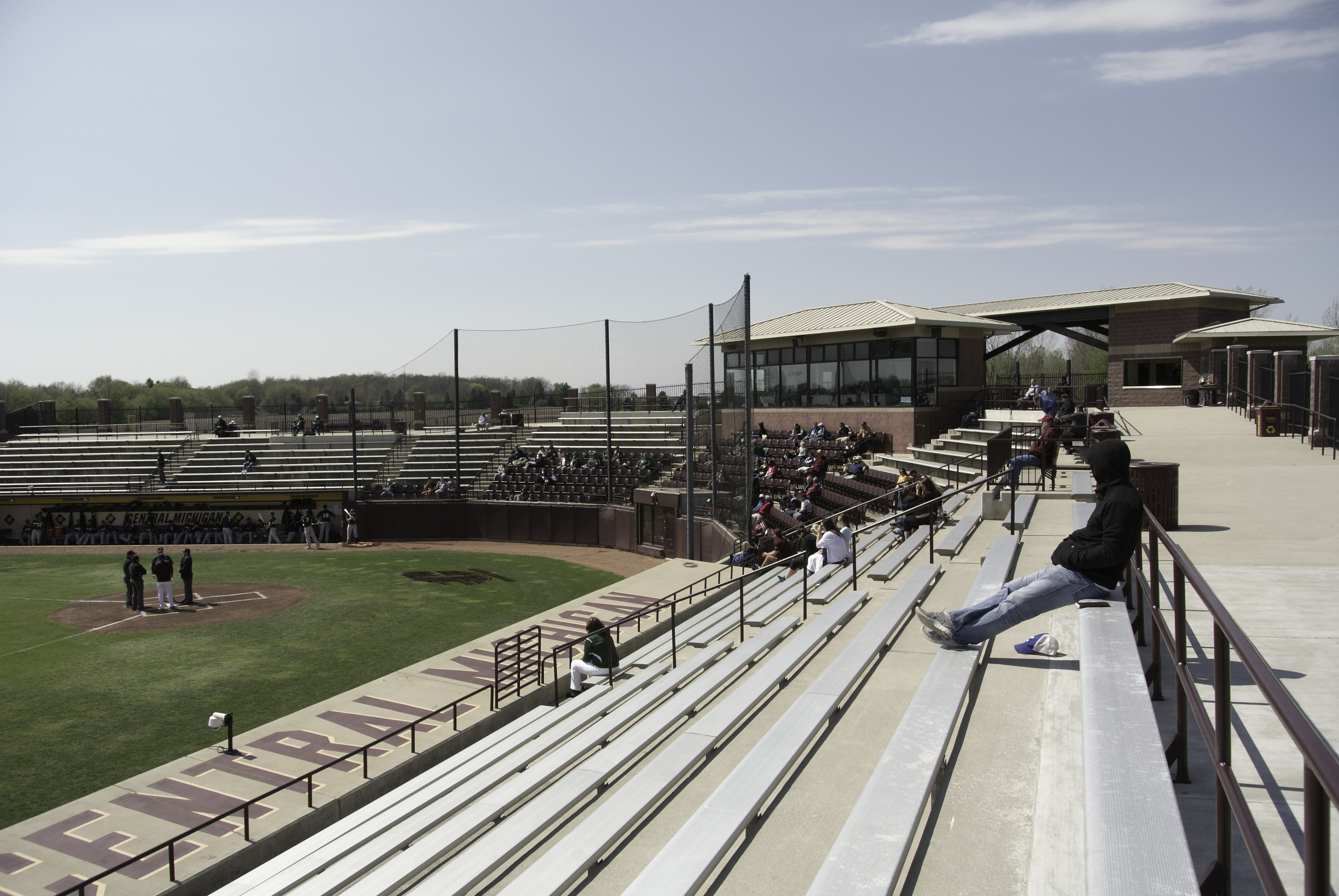
- CMU and Michigan State play at Theunissen in 2012.
- Interactive map of Bill Theunissen Stadium
- Location: West Campus Drive, Mount Pleasant, MI, United States
- Coordinates: 43.576341°N 84.77944°W
- Owner: Central Michigan University
- Operator: Central Michigan University
- Capacity: 2,046
- Surface: Natural grass
- Scoreboard: Electronic
- Field size: 330 ft. (LF), 375 ft. (LCF), 400 ft. (CF), 375 ft. (RCF), 330 ft. (RF)

Construction
- Built: 2002
- Opened: March 29, 2002

Tenant
- Central Michigan Chippewas (NCAA) (2002–present)

Bill Theunissen Stadium is a baseball venue in Mount Pleasant, Michigan, United States. It is home to the Central Michigan Chippewas baseball team of the NCAA Division I Mid-American Conference. The venue has a capacity of 2,046 spectators and opened in 2002. It is named after Bill Theunissen, former Central Michigan baseball coach, who led the Chippewas to a 151-114-1 record during his tenure (1953–1962).

== History ==
Following the 2001 season, Theunissen Stadium replaced Central Michigan's old Theunissen Stadium, home to the program since 1948. The old facility's name, changed from Alumni Field in 1986, was kept for the new Bill Theunissen Stadium. The venue's first game came on March 29, 2002, against Ohio. It was formally dedicated during an April 27, 2002, doubleheader against Northern Illinois.

== Features and renovations ==
Features of the facility include 400 chairbacked seats, a press box, message board, electronic scoreboard, outdoor practice area, and the Keilitz Clubhouse. In 2010, fencing was added to the practice facility adjacent to the stadium.

== See also ==
- List of NCAA Division I baseball venues
