= Alex Call =

American baseball player (born 1994)

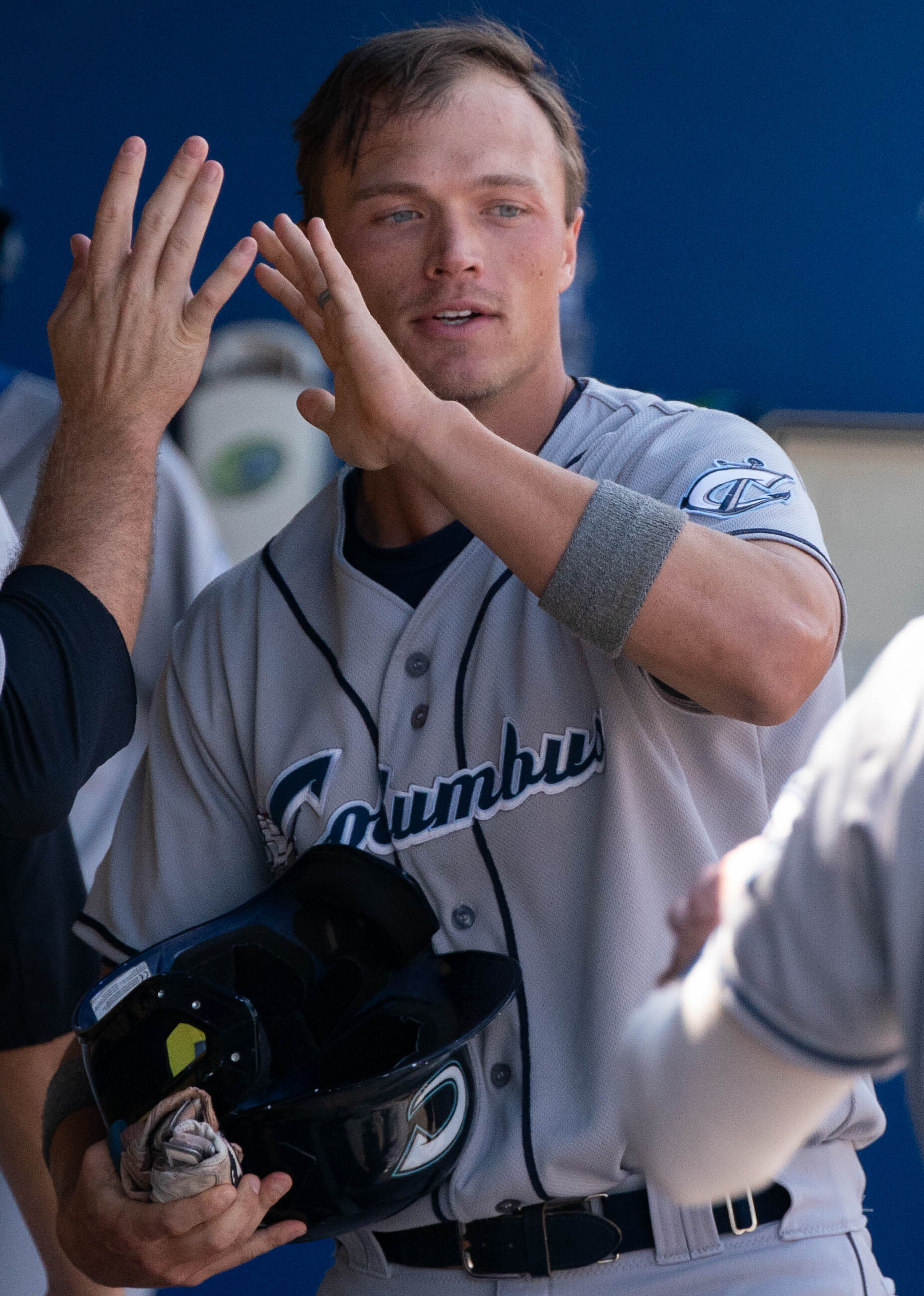
- Call with the Columbus Clippers in 2022

Los Angeles Dodgers – No. 12
- Outfielder
- Born: September 27, 1994 (age 32); Burnsville, Minnesota, U.S.
- Bats: Right Throws: Right

MLB debut
- July 11, 2022, for the Cleveland Guardians

MLB statistics (through 2026 season)
- Batting average: .241
- Home runs: 22
- Runs batted in: 116
- Stats at Baseball Reference

Teams
- Cleveland Guardians (2022); Washington Nationals (2022–2025); Los Angeles Dodgers (2025–present)

Career highlights and awards
- World Series champion (2025)

Alexander Marvin Call (born September 27, 1994) is an American professional baseball outfielder for the Los Angeles Dodgers of Major League Baseball (MLB). He has previously played in MLB for the Cleveland Guardians and Washington Nationals.

== Amateur career ==
Call was born in Burnsville, Minnesota and graduated from River Falls High School in River Falls, Wisconsin.

Call attended Ball State University, where he played college baseball for the Ball State Cardinals. In 2013 and 2014, he played collegiate summer baseball with the Eau Claire Express of the Northwoods League. In 2015, he played with the Orleans Firebirds of the Cape Cod Baseball League. In 2016, he was named the Mid-American Conference Baseball Player of the Year.

== Professional career ==
=== Chicago White Sox ===
The Chicago White Sox selected Call in the third round of the 2016 MLB draft. He split time between the rookie-level Great Falls Voyagers and Single-A Kannapolis Intimidators in his debut campaign, slashing a cumulative .308/.394/.445 with six home runs, 35 RBI, and 14 stolen bases. In 2017, Call played for the rookie-level Arizona League White Sox, Kannapolis, and the High-A Winston-Salem Dash, batting a combined .207/.295/.317 with three home runs, 33 RBI, and five stolen bases. The next year, he split the season between Winston-Salem and the Double-A Birmingham Barons. In 123 games between the two affiliates, he hit .248/.345/.415 with 12 home runs, 58 RBI, and six stolen bases.

=== Cleveland Indians / Guardians ===
On December 15, 2018, Call was traded to the Cleveland Indians in exchange for Yonder Alonso. He spent the 2019 season with the Double-A Akron RubberDucks, slashing .205/.266/.321 with five home runs and 31 RBI across 81 games.

Call did not play in a game in 2020 due to the cancellation of the minor league season because of the COVID-19 pandemic. In 2021, he played in a combined 109 games between Akron and the Triple-A Columbus Clippers, slashing .262/.356/.438 with 15 home runs, 50 RBI, and 15 stolen bases. He was assigned to Triple-A Columbus to begin the 2022 season, where he played in 71 games with a .280 average, 11 homers and 46 RBI.

Cleveland, now known as the Guardians, selected Call's contract on July 11, 2022, and promoted him to the major leagues for the first time. On July 22, he recorded his first career hit, a single off of Chicago White Sox reliever Tanner Banks. He appeared in 12 big league games for Cleveland, going 2-for-12 with four walks. On August 5, 2022, the Guardians designated Call for assignment, removing him from the roster.

=== Washington Nationals ===
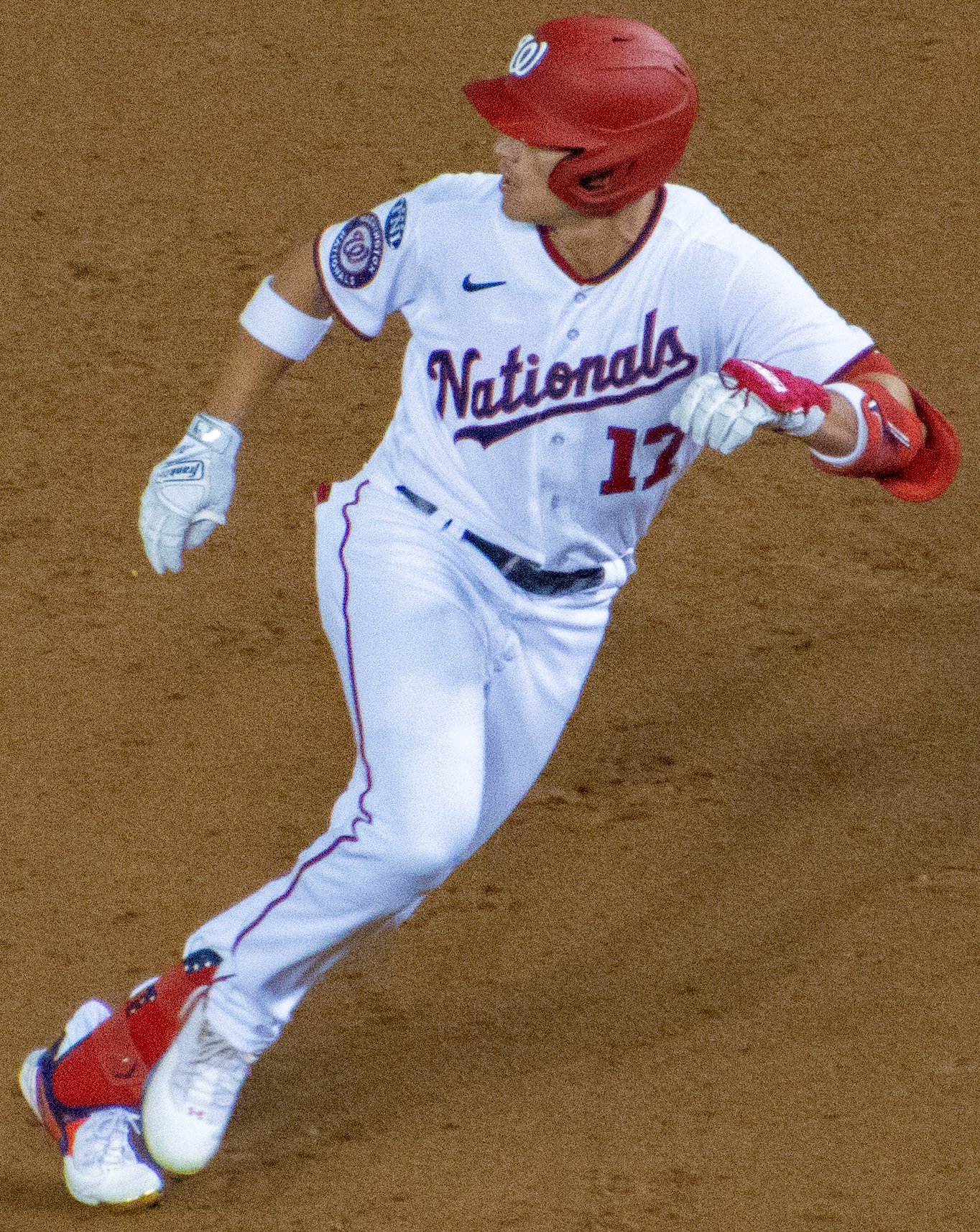
Call with the Nationals in 2023

On August 7, 2022, Call was claimed off waivers by the Washington Nationals. On August 19, he hit his first career major league home run, a two-run shot off of San Diego Padres closer Josh Hader. On September 8, he had four hits in five at bats, including a three-run home run, and five RBI in the Nationals 11–6 win over the St. Louis Cardinals. In 35 games for Washington, he had a slash line of .245/.330/.441 with five home runs and 13 RBI.

Call played in 128 games for the Nationals in 2023, hitting .200/.307/.307 with eight home runs, 38 RBIs, and nine stolen bases. He was optioned to the Triple–A Rochester Red Wings to begin the 2024 season, where he hit .222 with 11 homers and 52 RBI in 75 games. In 30 games with the Nationals he hit .343/.425/.525 with three home runs, 14 RBIs, and five stolen bases.

Call returned to the Nationals in 2025, playing in 72 games and hitting .274 with three home runs and 26 RBI.

=== Los Angeles Dodgers ===
On July 31, 2025, the Nationals traded Call to the Los Angeles Dodgers in exchange for Sean Paul Liñan and Eriq Swan. He played in 38 games for the Dodgers (primarily as the right handed part of a platoon with Michael Conforto) and batted .247 with two home runs and five RBI.

Call appeared in seven games in the 2025 postseason. He appeared as a pinch-hitter in the seventh inning of the first game of the Wild Card Series and hit an RBI single; He started two games in the Division Series and had two hits in two at-bats with two walks before being replaced in each game; he had one at-bat in the National League Championship Series. In the 2025 World Series, he pinch-hit for Andy Pages in the 13th inning of the 18-inning third game and wound up with one hit in three at-bats in the game; in Game 4, he was hitless in two at-bats after also replacing Pages; and he started Game 5 and was hitless in two at-bats with one walk.

Call played in 88 games for the Dodgers in 2026 as a reserve outfielder, batting .233 with one home run and 20 RBI.
