= Brad Snyder (baseball) =

American baseball player (born 1982)

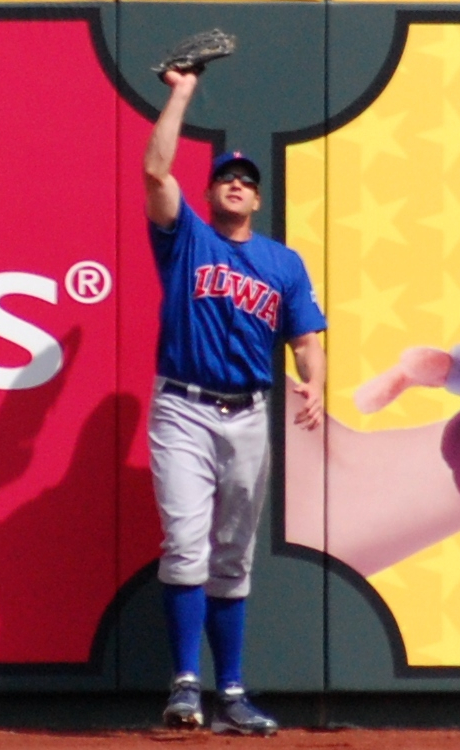
- Snyder playing for the Iowa Cubs, triple-A affiliates of the Chicago Cubs, in 2011
- Outfielder/First baseman
- Born: May 25, 1982 (age 43); Sandusky, Ohio, U.S.
- Batted: Left Threw: Left

Professional debut
- MLB: September 7, 2010, for the Chicago Cubs
- KBO: July 8, 2014, for the LG Twins

Last appearance
- MLB: June 22, 2014, for the Texas Rangers
- KBO: October 3, 2015, for the Nexen Heroes

MLB statistics
- Batting average: .167
- Home runs: 2
- Runs batted in: 8

KBO statistics
- Batting average: .267
- Home runs: 30
- Runs batted in: 88
- Stats at Baseball Reference

Teams
- Chicago Cubs (2010–2011); Texas Rangers (2014); LG Twins (2014); Nexen Heroes (2015)

Bradley Michael Snyder (born May 25, 1982) is an American former professional baseball outfielder. He was raised in Bellevue, Ohio, and attended Ball State University from 2001 to 2003. He played in Major League Baseball (MLB) for the Chicago Cubs and Texas Rangers. He also played in the KBO League for the LG Twins and Nexen Heroes.

== Playing career ==
=== College ===
In 168 games with Ball State, Snyder hit .378 with 36 home runs and 150 RBI. He was a first team Freshman All-America selection in 2001 and a first team All-American and the Mid-American Conference Baseball Player of the Year in 2003.

=== Cleveland Indians ===
The Cleveland Indians selected him with the 18th overall pick in the first round of the 2003 Major League Baseball draft.

=== Chicago Cubs ===
He was claimed off waivers by the Chicago Cubs on September 22, 2008 and sent to minor league camp on March 29, 2009. He was limited to 74 games in 2009 due to a sprained wrist. He hit .278 with 15 HR, 47 RBI and 40 runs with Triple-A Iowa.

Snyder was called up to the Chicago Cubs on September 7, 2010, and made his major league debut the same day following a season with the AAA Iowa Cubs where he hit .308 with 25 home runs and 106 RBIs. He recorded his first major league hit in his first start, a 2-run single off of Brett Sinkbeil. In 12 games with Chicago, he hit 5–27 with 1 double, 1 run and 5 RBI.

The Cubs purchased his contract on May 29, 2011. He was designated for assignment on June 11. In 9 games with Chicago, he hit 1–9 with a run. After the 2011 season, he elected for free agency. In 102 games with Iowa in 2011, he hit .290 with 11 HR, 57 RBI and 48 runs.

=== Houston Astros ===
On November 12, 2011, he signed a minor league contract with the Houston Astros. In 122 games with the Triple-A Oklahoma City RedHawks, he hit .304 with 20 HR, 66 RBI and 65 runs.

=== Arizona Diamondbacks ===
In November 2012, he signed a minor league contract with the Arizona Diamondbacks.

=== Texas Rangers ===
On November 14, 2013, Snyder signed a minor league contract with the Texas Rangers. His contract was purchased from the Triple-A Round Rock Express on June 10, 2014, when Mitch Moreland was placed on the disabled list. He played in ten games, all as a first baseman, hitting .167. He was designated for assignment on June 24 and elected to become a free agent.

=== Somerset Patriots ===
In 2016, Snyder signed with the Somerset Patriots of the Atlantic League of Professional Baseball, and played in 34 games for the team.

=== Vaqueros Laguna ===
In June 2016, Snyder signed with the Vaqueros Laguna of the Mexican Baseball League. He was released on June 16, 2017.
