= Shebek Stadium =

Baseball venue in Muncie, Indiana, U.S.

- Interactive map of Shebek Stadium
- Former names: Ball Diamond (1971-2025)
- Location: First Merchants Ballpark Complex in Muncie, Indiana
- Coordinates: 40.217606°N 85.421684°W
- Owner: Ball State University
- Operator: Ball State University
- Capacity: 1,700
- Surface: FieldTurf
- Field size: Left Field: 330 ft (100 m); Left-Center Field: 365 ft (111 m); Center Field: 400 ft (120 m); Right-Center Field: 365 ft (111 m); Right Field: 330 ft (100 m)

Construction
- Built: 1971
- Renovated: 2014-2016

Tenant
- Ball State Cardinals baseball (NCAA) (1971-present)

Website
- Shebek Stadium

Shebek Stadium is a baseball venue located on the campus of Ball State University in Muncie, Indiana, United States. It is part of the First Merchants Ballpark Complex, which also encompasses a softball field. It is home to the Ball State Cardinals baseball team, a member of the Division I Mid-American Conference. The field has a capacity of 1,700 people. Recent renovations to the field have added a new backstop, public address system, fencing, and video scoreboard.

Shebek Stadium first opened in 1971. In 1993, a softball field opened nearby. Between 2014 and 2016, Shebek Stadium underwent renovations, which included the installation of a FieldTurf surface. The softball field also was renovated at this time. In 2016, the baseball/softball complex was named the First Merchants Ballpark Complex after the First Merchants Corporation, a banking corporation headquartered in Muncie.

== See also ==
- List of NCAA Division I baseball venues
