= Central Michigan Chippewas baseball =

American college baseball team

- 2026 Central Michigan Chippewas baseball team
- Founded: 1892; 134 years ago
- University: Central Michigan University
- Head coach: Jake Sabol (3rd season)
- Conference: Mid–American
- Location: Mount Pleasant, Michigan
- Home stadium: Bill Theunissen Stadium (Capacity: 2,046)
- Nickname: Chippewas
- Colors: Maroon and gold

NCAA tournament appearances
- 1977, 1980, 1981, 1984, 1985, 1986, 1987, 1988, 1990, 1994, 1995, 2019, 2021, 2022

Conference tournament champions
- 1994, 1995, 2019, 2022

Conference regular season champions
- 1957, 1963, 1967, 1970, 1977, 1980, 1981, 1984, 1985, 1986, 1987, 1988, 1990, 1993, 2004, 2010, 2015, 2019, 2021

The Central Michigan Chippewas baseball team is a varsity intercollegiate athletic team of Central Michigan University in Mount Pleasant, Michigan, United States. The team is a member of the Mid-American Conference West division, which is part of the National Collegiate Athletic Association's Division I. Central Michigan's first baseball team was fielded in 1896. The team plays its home games at Theunissen Stadium in Mount Pleasant, Michigan. On June 27, 2023, CMU alum Jake Sabol was named the Chippewas' head coach. On May 1, 2021, Jordan Patty pitched the first perfect game in CMU history.

== Central Michigan in the NCAA tournament ==
Year	Record	Pct	Notes
1977	1–2	.333	Mideast Regional
1980	0–2	.000	Mideast Regional
1981	1–2	.333	Northeast Regional
1984	2–2	.500	Mideast Regional
1985	0–2	.000	South II Regional
1986	2–2	.500	Mideast Regional
1987	1–2	.333	Atlantic Regional
1988	2–2	.500	West II Regional
1990	0–2	.000	South II Regional
1994	0–2	.000	Atlantic II Regional
1995	1–2	.333	South Regional
2019	1–2	.333	Starkville Regional
2021	2–2	.500	South Bend Regional
2022	1–2	.333	Gainesville Regional
TOTALS	14-28	.333	

== Chippewas in Major League Baseball ==
Since the Major League Baseball draft began in 1965, Central Michigan has had 98 players selected.

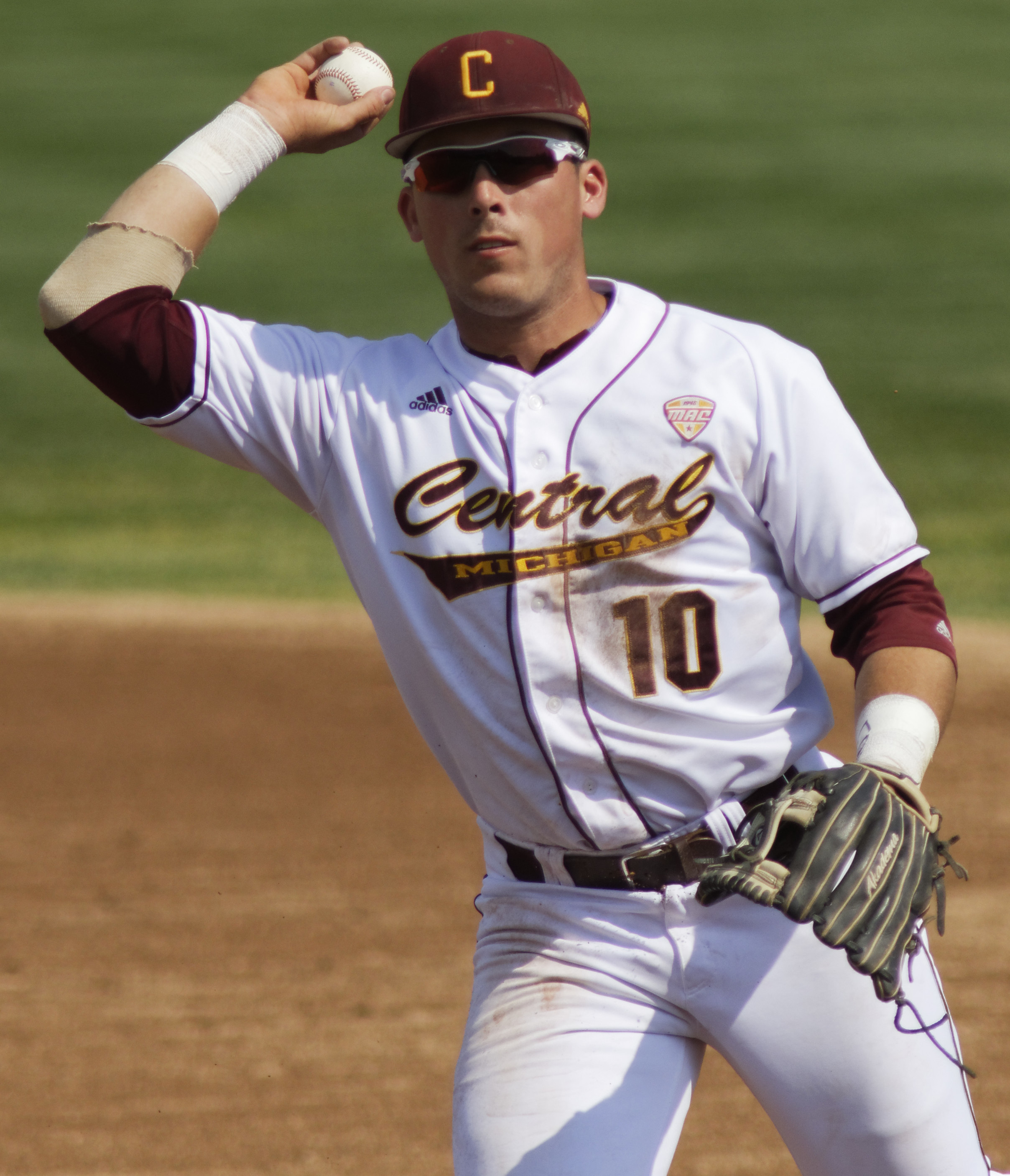
Jason Sullivan with the Chippewas in 2017

Notable players include:

- Lyle Bennett
- Josh Collmenter
- John Dobb
- Dietrich Enns
- Carmen Fanzone
- Lee Gardner
- Shawn Hare
- Steve Jaksa
- Craig Keilitz
- Chris Knapp
- Dick Lange
- Dave Machemer
- Zach McKinstry
- Dick Parfitt
- Dan Rohn
- Ray Soff
- Kevin Tapani
- Gary Taylor
- Tom Tresh
- Curt Young

== See also ==
- List of NCAA Division I baseball programs
