= Toledo Rockets baseball =

- 2026 Toledo Rockets baseball team
- Founded: 1921; 105 years ago
- University: University of Toledo
- Head coach: Rob Reinstetle (7th season)
- Conference: Mid–American
- Location: Toledo, Ohio
- Home stadium: Scott Park Baseball Complex (1921–present) (Capacity: 1,000)
- Nickname: Rockets
- Colors: Midnight blue and gold

Conference regular season champions
- 2012 (MAC West)

The Toledo Rockets baseball team is a varsity intercollegiate athletic team of the University of Toledo in Toledo, Ohio. The team is a member of the Mid-American Conference West division, which is part of the National Collegiate Athletic Association's Division I. Toledo's first baseball team was fielded in 1921. The team plays its home games at Scott Park Baseball Complex in Toledo, Ohio.

Toledo, along with Northern Illinois, are the only MAC schools to never win the Mid-American Conference baseball tournament, but the Rockets are the only MAC school to never reach the NCAA tournament.

== History ==
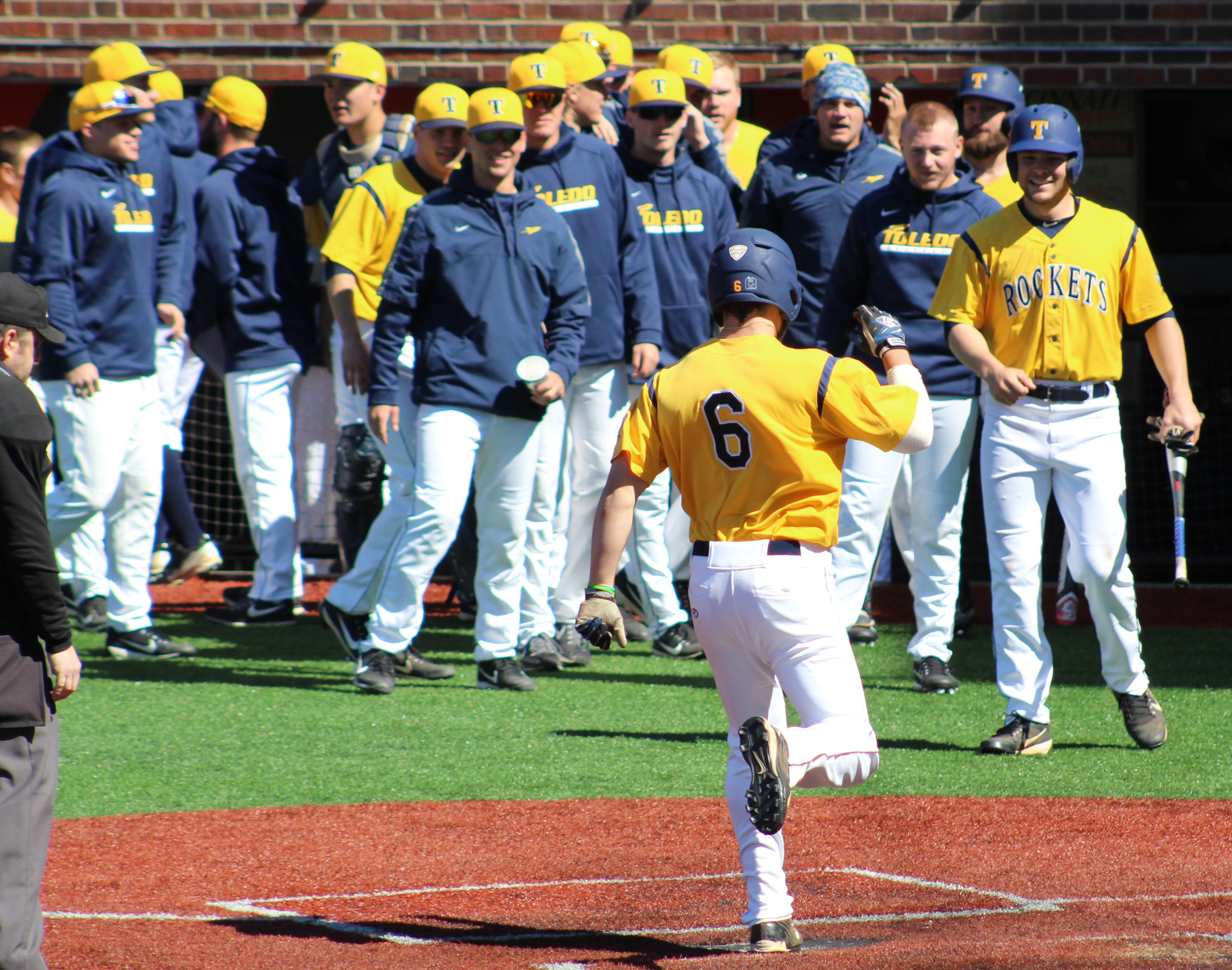
Ross Adolph is greeted at home plate by Toledo Rockets teammates as he scores a run during a 2018 game

In 1999, Joe Kruzel became the first Toledo manager to be named the MAC Coach of the Year. Jeremy Griffiths was named the conference's Pitcher of the Year in the same season.

In 2012, the Rockets were the regular season champions of the MAC West division for the first time in their history.

On May 20, 2019, Cory Mee stepped down as head coach after 16 seasons. On July 8, 2019, Rob Reinstetle was hired as head coach.

In 2021, Chris Meyers was named the Mid-American Conference Baseball Player of the Year. He was the first player in program history to receive that honor.

== See also ==
- List of NCAA Division I baseball programs
