= Steve Jaksa =

American baseball coach

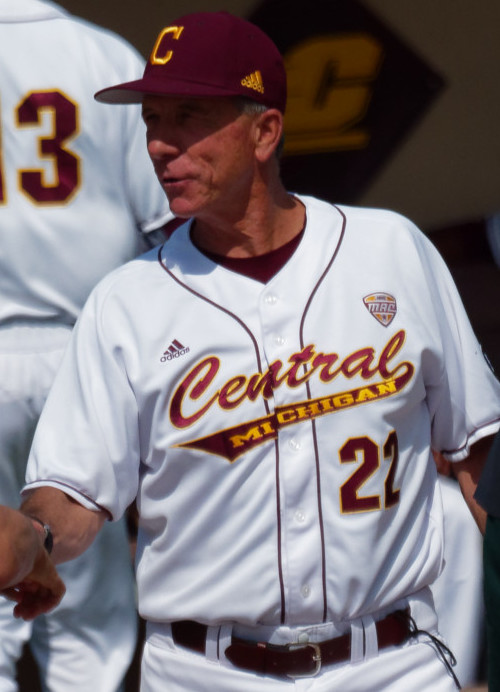
- Jaksa with Central Michigan in 2018

Current position
- Title: Head coach
- Team: Saginaw Valley State
- Conference: GLIAC
- Record: 46–51–1

Playing career
- 1974–1979: Central Michigan
- Position: Pitcher

Coaching career (HC unless noted)
- 1986: Miami (OH) (P/C)
- 1987–1997: Nouvel Catholic Central HS
- 1998: Northwood
- 1999–2001: Central Michigan (P/C)
- 2002–2018: Central Michigan
- 2019–2022: Saginaw Valley State

Head coaching record
- Overall: 581–497–3
- Tournaments: MAC: 24–32; NCAA: 0–0

Accomplishments and honors

Championships
- 6× West Division (2004, 2006, 2010, 2011, 2015, 2017)

Awards
- 2× MAC Coach of the Year (2004, 2015)

Stephen P. Jaksa is an American college baseball coach and former pitcher. He played college baseball at Central Michigan University from 1974 to 1979 for head coach Dave Keilitz. He was the head baseball coach at Northwood University in 1998, Central Michigan from 2002 to 2019, and Saginaw Valley State University from 2019 to 2022.

== Playing career ==
Jaksa graduated from Grand Blanc High School in Grand Blanc, Michigan. Jaksa then played college baseball at Central Michigan University from 1974 to 1979.

== Coaching career ==
Jaksa was an assistant at Miami University in 1986 while he was working on his master's degree. He then spent the next 11 years as the head baseball coach at Nouvel Catholic Central High School, where he won two state championships in 1990 and 1997. Jaksa became the head coach at Northwood University in 1998, and guided the team to a 28–25 record. The following year, he became an assistant for Judd Folske at Central Michigan. In the summer of 2002, Jaksa was promoted to head coach. Jaksa guided the Chippewas to 500 wins, and was twice named the Mid-American Conference Coach of the Year. (2004 and 2015). On June 2, 2018, Jaksa retired from Central Michigan as the program's 2nd most winning head coach. Just two months after his retirement, he was named the head baseball coach at Saginaw Valley State University. Jaksa retired from Saginaw Valley State University (SVSU) baseball in June 2022, following the conclusion of the 2022 season.

== Head coaching record ==
Record table
Season	Team	Overall	Conference	Standing	Postseason
Northwood Timberwolves (Great Lakes Intercollegiate Athletic Conference) (1998)
1998	Northwood	28–25	16–13	4th	
Northwood:		28–25	16–13		
Central Michigan Chippewas (Mid-American Conference) (2002–2018)
2002	Central Michigan	31–25	14–10	3rd (West)	MAC Tournament
2003	Central Michigan	25–28	9–15	T-5th (West)	
2004	Central Michigan	33–24	18–6	1st (West)	MAC Tournament
2005	Central Michigan	42–18	18–6	2nd (West)	MAC Tournament
2006	Central Michigan	35–23	17–9	1st (West)	MAC Tournament
2007	Central Michigan	35–21	21–6	2nd (West)	MAC Tournament
2008	Central Michigan	29–27–1	13–13	5th (West)	MAC Tournament
2009	Central Michigan	28–30	12–15	4th (West)	MAC Tournament
2010	Central Michigan	36–22	20–7	1st (West)	MAC Tournament
2011	Central Michigan	31–27	17–9	1st (West)	MAC Tournament
2012	Central Michigan	34–29	17–10	2nd (West)	MAC Tournament
2013	Central Michigan	25–32	12–15	T-4th (West)	MAC Tournament
2014	Central Michigan	35–23	19–8	2nd (West)	MAC Tournament
2015	Central Michigan	35–22	20–7	1st (West)	MAC Tournament
2016	Central Michigan	24–37	12–12	4th (West)	MAC Tournament
2017	Central Michigan	31–28	16–8	1st (West)	MAC Tournament
2018	Central Michigan	29–30–1	16–11	4th	MAC Tournament
Central Michigan:		507–421–2	271–167		
Saginaw Valley State Cardinals (Great Lakes Intercollegiate Athletic Conference) (2019–present)
2019	Saginaw Valley State	21–29–1	11–16–1	6th	GLIAC Tournament
2020	Saginaw Valley State	8–5	0–0		Season canceled due to COVID-19
2021	Saginaw Valley State	17–17	12–12	6th	GLIAC Tournament
Saginaw Valley State:		46–51–1	23–28–1		
Total:		581–497–3			
National champion Postseason invitational champion Conference regular season champion Conference regular season and conference tournament champion Division regular season champion Division regular season and conference tournament champion Conference tournament champion
