= Cory Mee =

American baseball coach and player

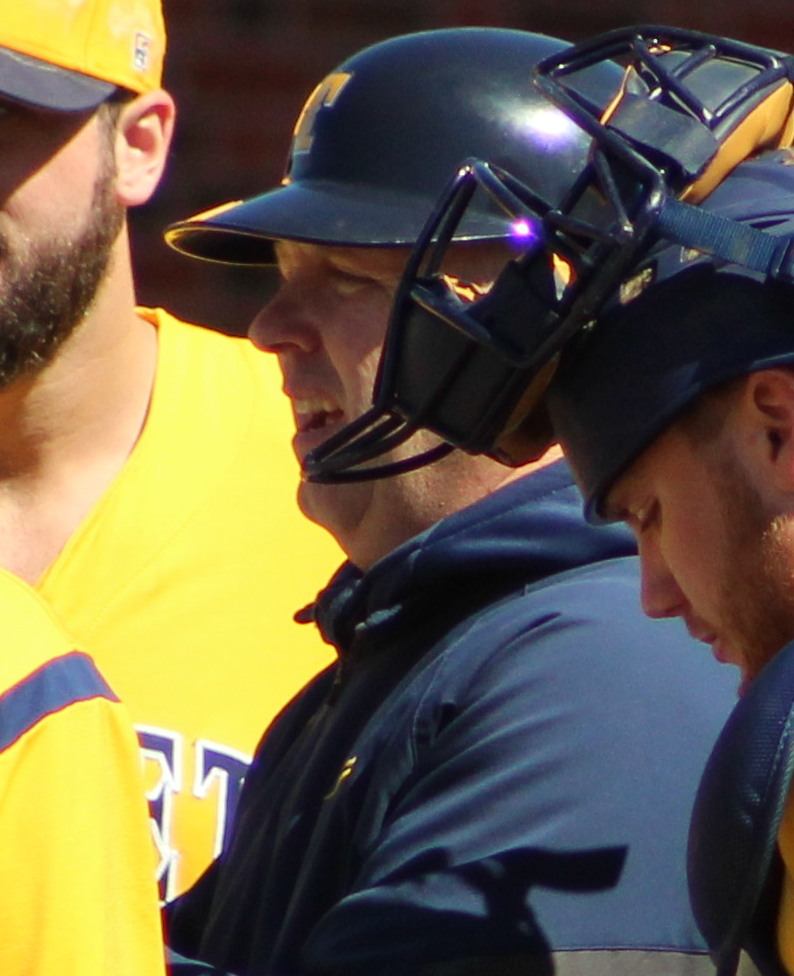
- Mee with Toledo in 2018

Current position
- Title: Associate head coach
- Team: Western Michigan
- Conference: MAC

Biographical details
- Born: February 14, 1970 (age 56); Jamestown, New York, U.S.

Playing career
- 1989–1992: Notre Dame
- 1992: Yakima Bears
- Position: Third baseman

Coaching career (HC unless noted)
- 1993: Notre Dame (vol. assistant)
- 1994: RIT (assistant)
- 1995–1999: Notre Dame (assistant)
- 2000–2003: Michigan State (assistant)
- 2004–2019: Toledo
- 2020: Eastern Michigan (assistant)
- 2021–2022: Akron (AHC/RC)
- 2023–present: Western Michigan (AHC/C/H)

Head coaching record
- Overall: 366–513–2
- Tournaments: 11–17 (MAC)

Accomplishments and honors

Championships
- 1 MAC West Division (2012)

Awards
- MAC Coach of the Year (2010)

Cory Thomas Mee (born February 14, 1970) is an American college baseball coach and former third baseman, who is the current associate head baseball coach and catching coach for the Western Michigan Broncos. Mee grew up in Hilton, New York, and graduated from Hilton High School in 1988. He played college baseball at the University of Notre Dame from 1989 to 1992, before playing professionally for the Yakima Bears in 1992. He served as the head coach at the University of Toledo from 2004 to 2019.

== Coaching career ==
Mee was named the head coach of the Rockets in 2004. On May 20, 2019, Mee stepped down from his position as head coach at Toledo. On September 4, 2019, Mee was named the volunteer assistant baseball coach at Eastern Michigan University. On July 16, 2020 he was named the associate head coach for the University of Akron.

== Head coaching record ==
This table shows Mee's record as a college coach.

Record table
Season	Team	Overall	Conference	Standing	Postseason
Toledo Rockets (Mid-American Conference) (2004–2019)
2004	Toledo	20–34	8–16	6th (West)	
2005	Toledo	15–39	5–17	6th (West)	
2006	Toledo	26–27	11–15	5th (West)	
2007	Toledo	26–28	14–13	4th (West)	MAC Tournament
2008	Toledo	18–31	10–13	6th (West)	
2009	Toledo	24–30	14–12	2nd (West)	MAC Tournament (Note: The top eight of the MAC's twelve teams qualified for the tournament in 2009.)
2010	Toledo	34–22	19–8	T-2nd (West)	MAC Tournament (Note: The top eight of the MAC's twelve teams qualified for the tournament in 2010.)
2011	Toledo	26–29	15–12	4th (West)	MAC Tournament (Note: The top eight of the MAC's twelve teams qualified for the tournament in 2011.)
2012	Toledo	30–27	19–8	1st (West)	MAC Tournament (Note: The top eight of the MAC's twelve teams qualified for the tournament in 2012.)
2013	Toledo	25–33	13–14	3rd (West)	MAC Tournament (Note: The top eight of the MAC's twelve teams qualified for the tournament in 2013.)
2014	Toledo	22–32	11–16	T-3rd (West)	
2015	Toledo	25–33	16–11	2nd (West)	MAC Tournament
2016	Toledo	19–38	13–11	3rd (West)	
2017	Toledo	17–41	9–15	6th (West)	MAC Tournament
2018	Toledo	22–33–1	14–13	5th	
2019	Toledo	17–36–1	4–21	10th	
Toledo:		366–513–2	195–215		
Total:		366–513–2			
National champion Postseason invitational champion Conference regular season champion Conference regular season and conference tournament champion Division regular season champion Division regular season and conference tournament champion Conference tournament champion
