= Mid-American Conference baseball tournament =

American collegiate baseball tournament

- Conference baseball championship
- Sport: Baseball
- Conference: Mid-American Conference
- Number of teams: 6
- Format: Double-elimination
- Played: 1981–1983; 1992–2019; 2022–present
- Last contest: 2026
- Current champion: Northern Illinois (1st)
- Most championships: Kent State (12)
- Official website: getsomemaction.com/baseball

Host stadiums
- Campus sites (1981, 1983, 1992–2007, 2022–2023); Franklin County Stadium (1982); V.A. Memorial Stadium (2008–2011); ForeFront Field (2012–2019, 2024–present)

The Mid-American Conference baseball tournament is the conference baseball championship of the Mid-American Conference, Division I members of the National Collegiate Athletic Association (NCAA). Since 2024, the top six finishers participate in the double-elimination tournament, which is played at a neutral site. The winner of the tournament receives an automatic berth to the NCAA Division I Baseball Championship.

The tournament began in 1981, but was not held from 1984 through 1991. It returned in 1992 and was held annually through 2019. It was scheduled to be played in May 2020, but was cancelled in March 2020 due to the coronavirus pandemic. As part of several changes announced in May 2020 related to the pandemic, the tournament was eliminated along with the post-season tournaments of seven other sports, for at least four seasons. The tournament, however, returned in May 2022 after the conference announced in May 2021 that the baseball tournament, along with all other conference tournaments that had been eliminated, would be restored for the 2021–22 athletic season. Kent State has won the most tournament titles with 12, followed by Central Michigan and Eastern Michigan with four each.

== Format ==
The MAC baseball tournament is held in mid to late May at the conclusion of the regular season. As of 2024, the tournament is held at a neutral site and the top six teams in conference play qualify, with the top two seeds receiving byes to the second round. Although the number of qualifying teams has been as low as four and as high as eight, the tournament has always used a double-elimination bracket.

The first tournament, in 1981, featured only the top four conference finishers in a double-elimination format. The following two seasons, 1982 and 1983, the conference was divided into East and West divisions and the top two seeds from each division qualified. When the tournament returned in 1992, the original format featuring the top four teams was again used and remained in place through 1997. The 1992 tournament was also when the All-Tournament Team and Most Valuable Player award were instituted.

Beginning in 1998, the conference was again divided into East and West divisions for the regular season and the tournament format was expanded to a six-team field in a double-elimination bracket, with the top three finishers from each division qualifying. In 2001, the format changed from the top three in each division to the top six overall, regardless of division. The number of qualifying teams was expanded to eight in 2008 and remained there through the 2017 tournament, but was reduced back to six teams for the 2018 and 2019 tournaments following the decisions to shutter the baseball programs at Akron in 2015 and Buffalo in 2017. The separate divisions were also eliminated after the 2017 season.

When the tournament was reinstated in 2022, the original format of only the top four teams qualifying was instituted again and remained in place for 2023. The conference expanded the tournament back to six teams in 2024 as part of its return to a neutral location.

== Location ==
Initially, the tournament was hosted by the top seed, with Central Michigan hosting the inaugural tournament in 1981 at Theunissen Stadium in Mount Pleasant, Michigan. The following season, the MAC held the tournament at a neutral location, playing the 1982 tournament at Franklin County Stadium in Columbus, Ohio. The tournament returned to a campus site in 1983, being hosted by Western Michigan at Hyames Field in Kalamazoo, Michigan.

When the tournament was revived in 1992, it continued to be held at campus sites, usually the home field of the top seed. Kent State hosted the first three tournaments after it was revived at Gene Michael Field in Kent, Ohio. The top seed continued to host through the 2007 tournament.

The conference began using a neutral site in 2008. V.A. Memorial Stadium in Chillicothe, Ohio, hosted the tournament from 2008 through 2011, followed by ForeFront Field (initially known as All Pro Freight Stadium, later known as Mercy Health Park and Crushers Stadium) in Avon, Ohio, where it remained from 2012 through 2019 and was scheduled to be held in 2020. Following the tournament's reinstatement in 2022, it was again held at campus sites in 2022 and 2023, but the conference announced in August 2023 that the tournament would return to ForeFront Field, then known as Mercy Health Park, in 2024 through at least 2026.

== Champions ==
=== By year ===
The following is a list of tournament champions and sites listed by year.

Year	Site	Champion	MVP
1981	Theunissen Stadium • Mount Pleasant, Michigan	Eastern Michigan	—
1982	Franklin County Stadium • Columbus, Ohio	Eastern Michigan	—
1983	Hyames Field • Kalamazoo, Michigan	Miami	—
No tournament held, 1984–1991
1992	Gene Michael Field • Kent, Ohio	Kent State	Dustin Hermanson (Kent State)
1993	Gene Michael Field • Kent, Ohio	Kent State	Ryan Beeney (Kent State)
1994	Gene Michael Field • Kent, Ohio	Central Michigan	Tim Fails (Kent State)
1995	Steller Field • Bowling Green, Ohio	Central Michigan	Pat Mahoney (Central Michigan)
1996	Gene Michael Field • Kent, Ohio	Akron	Dave Yoder (Akron)
1997	Trautwein Field • Athens, Ohio	Ohio	Bart Leahy (Ohio)
1998	Steller Field • Bowling Green, Ohio	Bowling Green	Bob Niemet (Bowling Green)
1999	Ball Baseball Field • Muncie, Indiana	Bowling Green	Sean Ryan (Bowling Green)
2000	Gene Michael Field • Kent, Ohio	Miami	John Lackaff (Miami)
2001	Ball Diamond • Muncie, Indiana	Kent State	John Van Benschoten (Kent State)
2002	Steller Field • Bowling Green, Ohio	Kent State	Brad Snyder (Ball State)
2003	Gene Michael Field • Kent, Ohio	Eastern Michigan	Brian Bixler (Eastern Michigan)
2004	Theunissen Stadium • Mt. Pleasant, Michigan	Kent State	Ryan Ford (Eastern Michigan)/Andy Sonnanstine (Kent State)
2005	Hayden Park • Oxford, Ohio	Miami	Paul Frietch (Miami)
2006	Schoonover Stadium • Kent, Ohio	Ball State	Kyle Dygert (Ball State)
2007	Oestrike Stadium • Ypsilanti, Michigan	Kent State	Jason Patton (Kent State)
2008	V.A. Memorial Stadium • Chillicothe, Ohio	Eastern Michigan	Jack Leonard (Eastern Michigan)
2009	V.A. Memorial Stadium • Chillicothe, Ohio	Kent State	Chris Tremblay (Kent State)
2010	V.A. Memorial Stadium • Chillicothe, Ohio	Kent State	Justin Gill (Kent State)
2011	V.A. Memorial Stadium • Chillicothe, Ohio	Kent State	David Starn (Kent State)
2012	All Pro Freight Stadium • Avon, Ohio	Kent State	David Starn (Kent State)
2013	All Pro Freight Stadium • Avon, Ohio	Bowling Green	Nick Bruns (Bowling Green)
2014	All Pro Freight Stadium • Avon, Ohio	Kent State	Cody Koch (Kent State)
2015	All Pro Freight Stadium • Avon, Ohio	Ohio	Logan Cozart (Ohio)
2016	All Pro Freight Stadium • Avon, Ohio	Western Michigan	Keegan Akin (Western Michigan)
2017	Sprenger Stadium • Avon, Ohio	Ohio	Spencer Ibarra (Ohio)
2018	Sprenger Stadium • Avon, Ohio	Kent State	Eli Kraus (Kent State)
2019	Sprenger Stadium • Avon, Ohio	Central Michigan	Griffin Lockwood-Powell (Central Michigan)
2020	Crushers Stadium • Avon, Ohio	Cancelled due to the coronavirus pandemic	
No tournament held in 2021
2022	Ball Diamond • Muncie, Indiana	Central Michigan	Garrett Navarra (Central Michigan)
2023	Schoonover Stadium • Kent, Ohio	Ball State	Adam Tellier (Ball State)
2024	Crushers Stadium • Avon, Ohio	Western Michigan	Dylan Nevar (Western Michigan)
2025	Crushers Stadium • Avon, Ohio	Miami	Dom Krupinski (Miami)
2026	ForeFront Field • Avon, Ohio	Northern Illinois	Max Vaisvila (Northern Illinois)

=== By school ===
The following is a list of tournament champions listed by school and the years each team was eligible to play in the tournament.

Team	Tenure	Championships	Title Years
Kent State	1981–1983; 1992–2020; 2022–present	12	1992, 1993, 2001, 2002, 2004, 2007, 2009, 2010, 2011, 2012, 2014, 2018
Eastern Michigan	1981–1983; 1992–2020; 2022–present	4	1981, 1982, 2003, 2008
Central Michigan	1981–2020; 1992–2020; 2022–present	4	1994, 1995, 2019, 2022
Miami	1981–1983; 1992–2020; 2022–present	4	1983, 2000, 2005, 2025
Bowling Green	1981–1983; 1992–2020; 2022–present	3	1998, 1999, 2013
Ohio	1981–1983; 1992–2020; 2022–present	3	1997, 2015, 2017
Ball State	1981–1983; 1992–2020; 2022–present	2	2006, 2023
Western Michigan	1981–1983; 1992–2020; 2022–present	2	2016, 2024
Akron	1993–2015; 2020; 2022–present	1	1996
Toledo	1981–1983; 1992–2020; 2022–present	0	
Northern Illinois	1981–1982; 1998–2020; 2022–2026	1	2026
Marshall	1998–2005	0	
Buffalo	2001–2017	0	

Former conference members shaded in ██ silver
