= 2003 Mid-American Conference baseball tournament =

American collegiate baseball tournament

- Teams: 6
- Format: Double-elimination
- Finals site: Gene Michael Field; Kent, OH
- Champions: Eastern Michigan (3rd title)
- Winning coach: Roger Coryell (1st title)
- MVP: Brian Bixler (Eastern Michigan)

2003 Mid-American Conference baseball standings
	Conf.						Overall
Team	W		L		T	PCT	W		L		T	PCT
East
Kent State ^{x}‍‍‍	20	–	4	–	0	.833	38	–	18	–	0	.679
Miami ‍‍‍	19	–	9	–	0	.679	36	–	24	–	1	.598
Ohio ‍‍‍	15	–	11	–	0	.577	35	–	23	–	0	.603
Akron ‍‍‍	12	–	15	–	0	.444	22	–	30	–	0	.423
Marshall ‍‍‍	11	–	16	–	0	.407	22	–	31	–	1	.417
Buffalo ‍‍‍	5	–	21	–	0	.192	16	–	37	–	0	.302
West
Ball State ^{x}‍‍‍	17	–	10	–	0	.630	36	–	21	–	0	.632
Eastern Michigan ‍‍‡‍^{y}	16	–	11	–	0	.593	33	–	28	–	0	.541
Northern Illinois ‍‍‍	15	–	11	–	0	.577	34	–	24	–	0	.586
Western Michigan ‍‍‍	16	–	12	–	0	.571	25	–	26	–	0	.490
Central Michigan ‍‍‍	9	–	15	–	0	.375	25	–	28	–	0	.472
Bowling Green ‍‍‍	9	–	18	–	0	.333	17	–	28	–	0	.378
Toledo ‍‍‍	8	–	19	–	0	.296	22	–	29	–	0	.431
† – Conference champion ‡ – Tournament champion y – Invited to the NCAA tournament As of June 30, 2003; Rankings from Collegiate Baseball

The 2003 Mid-American Conference baseball tournament took place in May 2003. The top six regular season finishers met in the double-elimination tournament held at Gene Michael Field on the campus of Kent State University in Kent, Ohio. This was the fifteenth Mid-American Conference postseason tournament to determine a champion. Fourth seed Eastern Michigan won their third tournament championship, and first since the event resumed in 1992, to earn the conference's automatic bid to the 2003 NCAA Division I baseball tournament.

== Seeding and format ==
The winner of each division claimed the top two seeds, while the next four finishers based on conference winning percentage only, regardless of division, participated in the tournament. The teams played double-elimination tournament. This was the sixth year of the six team tournament.

Team	W	L	PCT	GB	Seed
East Division
Kent State	20	4	.833	–	1
Miami	19	9	.679	3	3
Ohio	15	11	.577	6	5
Akron	12	15	.444	9.5	–
Marshall	11	16	.407	10.5	–
Buffalo	5	21	.192	16	–
West Division
Ball State	17	10	.630	–	2
Eastern Michigan	16	11	.593	1	4
Northern Illinois	15	11	.577	1.5	6
Western Michigan	16	12	.571	1.5	–
Central Michigan	9	15	.375	6.5	–
Bowling Green	9	18	.333	8	–
Toledo	8	19	.296	9	–

== Results ==
First round
1	Kent State	3
6	Northern Illinois	4
3	Miami	6
4	Eastern Michigan	4
2	Ball State	4
5	Ohio	14

Second round
6	Northern Illinois	4*
4	Eastern Michigan	6*
2	Ball State	2†
1	Kent State	3†
3	Miami	4
5	Ohio	3
5	Ohio	9
6	Northern Illinois	8

Third round
4	Eastern Michigan	7
1	Kent State	4
3	Miami	6
5	Ohio	0

Final
4	Eastern Michigan	3	6
3	Miami	2	5

* - Indicates game required 12 innings. † - Indicates game required 10 innings.

== All-Tournament Team ==
The following players were named to the All-Tournament Team.

Name	School
Matt Long	Miami
Dale Hayes	Eastern Michigan
John Slone	Miami
Anthony Gressick	Ohio
Joe Tucker	Kent State
Joe Mazzuca	Northern Illinois
Brian Bixler	Eastern Michigan
Derrick Peterson	Eastern Michigan
Phil Sabatini	Ohio
David Cook	Miami

=== Most Valuable Player ===
Brian Bixler won the Tournament Most Valuable Player award. Bixler played for Eastern Michigan.
