= 2023 Mid-American Conference baseball tournament =

American collegiate baseball tournament

- Teams: 4
- Format: Double-elimination
- Finals site: Schoonover Stadium; Kent, Ohio
- Champions: Ball State (2nd title)
- Winning coach: Rich Maloney (1st title)
- MVP: Adam Tellier (Ball State)
- Television: ESPN+

2023 Mid-American Conference baseball standings
	Conf.				Overall
Team	W		L	PCT	W		L	PCT
Kent State ‍†‍‍	24	–	6	.800	40	–	14	.741
Central Michigan ‍‍‍	19	–	11	.633	31	–	21	.596
Ball State ‍‍‡‍^{y}	19	–	11	.633	33	–	21	.611
Western Michigan ‍‍‍	18	–	11	.621	21	–	29	.420
Ohio ‍‍‍	15	–	15	.500	19	–	30	.388
Toledo ‍‍‍	14	–	16	.467	26	–	29	.473
Miami (OH) ‍‍‍	13	–	17	.433	21	–	35	.375
Bowling Green ‍‍‍	13	–	17	.433	20	–	30	.400
Eastern Michigan ‍‍‍	12	–	18	.400	27	–	26	.509
Akron ‍‍‍	12	–	18	.400	21	–	34	.382
Northern Illinois ‍‍‍	5	–	24	.172	10	–	43	.189
† – Conference champion ‡ – Tournament champion y – Invited to the NCAA Tournament; As of May 20, 2023; Rankings from D1Baseball

The 2023 Mid-American Conference baseball tournament was held from May 24 through 27, 2023. The top four regular season finishers of the league's eleven teams met in the double-elimination tournament held at Schoonover Stadium in Kent, Ohio, the home field of Kent State who won the 2023 regular season conference title.

Ball State won the tournament and earned the conference's automatic bid to the 2023 NCAA Division I baseball tournament.

== Seeding and format ==
The top four teams were seeded according conference winning percentage. Teams then played a double-elimination tournament.

Team	W–L	Pct	GB	Seed	Tiebreaker
Kent State	24–6	.800	-	1	
Central Michigan	19–11	.633	5	2	CMU 3–0 v. Ball State
Ball State	19–11	.633	5	3	Ball State 0–3 v. CMU
Western Michigan	18–11	.621	5.5	4	
Ohio	15–15	.500	9	-	
Toledo	14–16	.467	10	-	
Bowling Green	13–17	.433	11	-	BGSU 2–1 vs. Miami
Miami	13–17	.433	11	-	Miami 1–2 vs. BGSU
Eastern Michigan	12–18	.400	12	-	EMU 2–1 vs. Akron
Akron	12–18	.400	12	-	Akron 1–2 vs. EMU
Northern Illinois	5–24	.172	18.5	-	

== Results ==
MAC tournament teams
(1) Kent State Golden Flashes	(2) Central Michigan Chippewas	(3) Ball State Cardinals	(4) Western Michigan Broncos

First Round; May 24
1	Kent State	6
4	Western Michigan	4
2	Central Michigan	6
3	Ball State	7
Losers Bracket Semifinal; May 25
4	Western Michigan	2
2	Central Michigan	5

Semifinal; May 25
1	Kent State	1
3	Ball State	6
Losers Bracket Final; May 26
1	Kent State	10
2	Central Michigan	2

Championship; May 27
3	Ball State	12	-
1	Kent State	9	-

== Schedule ==
Game	Time*	Matchup^{#}	Score	Television	Attendance
Wednesday, May 24
1	12:30 pm	No. 1 Kent State vs. No. 4 Western Michigan	6–4	ESPN+	313
2	4:00 pm	No. 2 Central Michigan vs. No. 3 Ball State	6–7	ESPN+	162
Thursday, May 25
3	12:30 pm	No. 2 Central Michigan vs. No. 4 Western Michigan; Elimination Game	5–2	ESPN+	121
4	6:00 pm	No. 1 Kent State vs. No. 3 Ball State	1–6	ESPN+	539
Friday, May 26
5	12:30 pm	No. 1 Kent State vs. No. 2 Central Michigan; Elimination Game	10–2	ESPN+	309
Saturday, May 27
6	12:30 pm	No. 1 Kent State vs. No. 3 Ball State; Championship Game	9–12	ESPN+	487
*Game times in EDT. # – Rankings denote tournament seed.

== Conference championship ==
May 27, 2023, 12:30 p.m. (EDT) at Schoonover Stadium in Kent, Ohio
Team	1	2	3	4	5	6	7	8	9	R	H	E
Ball State	2	0	3	2	1	0	0	0	4	12	14	0
Kent State	1	0	1	0	0	0	5	2	0	9	12	1
WP: Jacob Hartlaub (4-2) LP: Mitchell Scott (2-2); Home runs: BALL: Adam Tellier, Blake Bevis, Logan Flood; KENT: Justin Miknis; Attendance: 487; Umpires: Sal Giacomantonio (HP), Kyle Reese (1B), James Muhleck (2B), Andy Dudones (3B); Boxscore

== All-Tournament Team ==
The following players were named to the All-Tournament Team.

Name	School
Cade Sullivan	Western Michigan
Garrett Navara	Central Michigan
Christian Mitchelle	Central Michigan
Aidan Longwell	Kent State
Kyle Jackson	Kent State
Collin Mathews	Kent State
Ryan Peltier	Ball State
Adam Tellier (MVP)	Ball State
Decker Scheffler	Ball State
Trennor O'Donnell	Ball State
