= 1994 Mid-American Conference baseball tournament =

American collegiate baseball tournament

- Teams: 4
- Format: Double-elimination
- Finals site: Gene Michael Field; Kent, OH
- Champions: Central Michigan (1st title)
- Winning coach: Dean Kreiner (1st title)
- MVP: Tim Fails (Kent State)

1994 Mid-American Conference baseball standings
	Conf.				Overall
Team	W		L	PCT	W		L	PCT
No. 29 Kent State ‍†‍‍^{y}	18	–	7	.720	33	–	17	.660
Ohio ‍‍‍	18	–	10	.643	34	–	19	.642
Bowling Green ‍‍‍	16	–	10	.615	29	–	18	.617
Central Michigan ‍‍‡‍^{y}	18	–	12	.600	38	–	21	.644
Western Michigan ‍‍‍	18	–	12	.600	30	–	23	.566
Eastern Michigan ‍‍‍	15	–	12	.556	29	–	27	.518
Toledo ‍‍‍	12	–	16	.429	23	–	31	.426
Akron ‍‍‍	10	–	16	.385	29	–	25	.537
Miami ‍‍‍	9	–	21	.300	18	–	36	.333
Ball State ‍‍‍	4	–	22	.154	17	–	32	.347
† – Conference champion ‡ – Tournament champion y – Invited to the NCAA tournament As of June 30, 1994; Rankings from Collegiate Baseball

The 1994 Mid-American Conference baseball tournament took place in May 1994. The top four regular season finishers met in the double-elimination tournament held at Gene Michael Field on the campus of Kent State University in Kent, Ohio. This was the sixth Mid-American Conference postseason tournament to determine a champion. Fourth seeded Central Michigan won their first tournament championship to earn the conference's automatic bid to the 1994 NCAA Division I baseball tournament.

== Seeding and format ==
The top four finishers based on conference winning percentage only, participated in the tournament. The teams played double-elimination tournament. Central Michigan claimed the fourth seed over Western Michigan by tiebreaker.

Team	W	L	PCT	GB	Seed
Kent State	18	7	.720	–	1
Ohio	18	10	.643	1.5	2
Bowling Green	16	10	.615	2.5	3
Central Michigan	18	12	.600	2.5	4
Western Michigan	18	12	.600	2.5	–
Eastern Michigan	15	12	.556	4	–
Toledo	12	16	.429	7.5	–
Akron	10	16	.385	8.5	–
Miami	9	21	.300	11.5	–
Ball State	4	22	.154	14.5	–

== Results ==
Upper round 1
1	Kent State	1
4	Central Michigan	2
2	Ohio	7
3	Bowling Green	6
Lower round 1
1	Kent State	5
3	Bowling Green	1

Upper final
4	Central Michigan	5
2	Ohio	1
Lower final
2	Ohio	7
1	Kent State	9

Final
4	Central Michigan	5^{11}	—
1	Kent State	4	—

== All-Tournament Team ==
The following players were named to the All-Tournament Team.

Name	School
Travis Miller	Kent State
Mike Snopkowski	Ohio
Tim Fails	Kent State
Sean Freeman	Kent State
Kevin Young	Central Michigan
Kevin Zellers	Kent State
Tony Carroll	Central Michigan
Andy Kruger	Central Michigan
Steve Smetana	Kent State
Chris Mongriardo	Kent State

=== Most Valuable Player ===
Tim Fails won the Tournament Most Valuable Player award. Fails played for Kent State.
