= 2000 Mid-American Conference baseball tournament =

American collegiate baseball tournament

- Teams: 6
- Format: Double-elimination
- Finals site: Gene Michael Field; Kent, OH
- Champions: Miami (2nd title)
- Winning coach: Tracy Smith (1st title)
- MVP: John Lackaff (Miami)

2000 Mid-American Conference baseball standings
	Conf.						Overall
Team	W		L		T	PCT	W		L		T	PCT
East
Kent State ^{x}‍‍‍	20	–	6	–	0	.769	40	–	18	–	0	.690
Ohio ‍‍‍	18	–	10	–	0	.643	31	–	25	–	1	.553
Miami ‍‍‡‍^{y}	16	–	12	–	0	.571	40	–	23	–	0	.635
Bowling Green ‍‍‍	14	–	12	–	0	.538	29	–	24	–	1	.546
Akron ‍‍‍	12	–	15	–	0	.444	26	–	30	–	0	.464
Marshall ‍‍‍	7	–	20	–	0	.259	21	–	33	–	1	.391
West
Central Michigan ^{x}‍‍‍	18	–	8	–	0	.692	41	–	17	–	0	.707
Ball State ‍‍‍	18	–	8	–	0	.692	34	–	23	–	0	.596
Northern Illinois ‍‍‍	11	–	15	–	0	.423	24	–	33	–	0	.421
Western Michigan ‍‍‍	10	–	18	–	0	.357	26	–	27	–	0	.491
Toledo ‍‍‍	9	–	19	–	0	.321	21	–	33	–	0	.389
Eastern Michigan ‍‍‍	9	–	19	–	0	.321	20	–	36	–	0	.357
† – Conference champion ‡ – Tournament champion y – Invited to the NCAA tournament As of June 30, 2000; Rankings from Collegiate Baseball

The 2000 Mid-American Conference baseball tournament took place in May 2000. The top three regular season finishers from each division met in the double-elimination tournament held at Gene Michael Field on the campus of Kent State University in Kent, Ohio. This was the twelfth Mid-American Conference postseason tournament to determine a champion. Third seed from the east Miami won their second tournament championship to earn the conference's automatic bid to the 2000 NCAA Division I baseball tournament.

== Seeding and format ==
The top three finishers in each division, based on conference winning percentage only, participated in the tournament. The top seed in each division played the third seed from the opposite division in the first round. The teams played double-elimination tournament. This was the third year of the six team tournament. Central Michigan claimed the top seed from the West over Ball State by tiebreaker.

Team	W	L	PCT	GB	Seed
East Division
Kent State	20	6	.769	–	1E
Ohio	18	10	.567	3	2E
Miami	16	12	.571	5	3E
Bowling Green	14	12	.538	6	–
Akron	12	15	.444	8.5	–
Marshall	7	20	.259	13.5	–
West Division
Central Michigan	18	8	.692	–	1W
Ball State	18	8	.692	–	2W
Northern Illinois	11	15	.423	7	3W
Western Michigan	10	18	.357	9	–
Toledo	9	19	.321	10	–
Eastern Michigan	9	19	.321	10	–

== Results ==
First round
1E	Kent State	10
3W	Northern Illinois	4
2E	Ohio	5
2W	Ball State	2
1W	Central Michigan	3
3E	Miami	7

Second round
1E	Kent State	1
2W	Ball State	7
1W	Central Michigan	8
3W	Northern Illinois	4
2E	Ohio	4
3E	Miami	6
1E	Kent State	1
2E	Ohio	3

Third round
2W	Ball State	2
1W	Central Michigan	1
3E	Miami	10
2E	Ohio	5

Final
2W	Ball State	7	—
3E	Miami	16	—

== All-Tournament Team ==
The following players were named to the All-Tournament Team.

Name	School
Tony Schiml	Ohio
Dan Schell	Central Michigan
Alex Marconi	Kent State
John Lackaff	Miami
Joe Spain	Miami
Doug Boone	Ball State
Bobby Barnes	Miami
Matt Crowley	Central Michigan
Kevin Uzarski	Central Michigan
Tom Yost	Miami

=== Most Valuable Player ===
John Lackaff won the Tournament Most Valuable Player award. Lackaff played for Miami.
