= 2006 Mid-American Conference baseball tournament =

American collegiate baseball tournament

- Teams: 6
- Format: Double-elimination
- Finals site: Schoonover Stadium; Kent, OH
- Champions: Ball State (1st title)
- Winning coach: Greg Beals (1st title)
- MVP: Kyle Dygert (Ball State)

2006 Mid-American Conference baseball standings
	Conf.				Overall
Team	W		L	PCT	W		L	PCT
East
Kent State ^{x}‍‍‍	19	–	7	.731	38	–	19	.667
Miami ‍‍‍	17	–	10	.630	33	–	25	.569
Ohio ‍‍‍	14	–	13	.519	22	–	25	.468
Bowling Green ‍‍‍	11	–	16	.407	26	–	27	.491
Akron ‍‍‍	8	–	18	.308	15	–	36	.294
Buffalo ‍‍‍	6	–	21	.222	15	–	37	.288
West
Central Michigan ^{x}‍‍‍	17	–	9	.654	35	–	23	.603
Ball State ‍‍‡‍^{y}	16	–	9	.640	38	–	22	.633
Western Michigan ‍‍‍	16	–	9	.640	30	–	22	.577
Eastern Michigan ‍‍‍	14	–	12	.538	27	–	27	.500
Toledo ‍‍‍	11	–	15	.423	26	–	27	.491
Northern Illinois ‍‍‍	8	–	18	.308	24	–	31	.436
† – Conference champion ‡ – Tournament champion y – Invited to the NCAA tournament As of June 30, 2006; Rankings from Collegiate Baseball

The 2006 Mid-American Conference baseball tournament took place in May 2006. The top six regular season finishers met in the double-elimination tournament held at Olga Mural Field at Schoonover Stadium on the campus of Kent State University in Kent, Ohio. This was the eighteenth Mid-American Conference postseason tournament to determine a champion. Third-seed Ball State won their third tournament championship to earn the conference's automatic bid to the 2006 NCAA Division I baseball tournament.

== Seeding and format ==
The winner of each division claimed the top two seeds, while the next four finishers based on conference winning percentage only, regardless of division, participated in the tournament. The teams played double-elimination tournament. This was the ninth year of the six team tournament.

Team	W	L	PCT	GB	Seed
East Division
Kent State	19	7	.731	–	1
Miami	17	10	.630	2.5	5
Ohio	14	13	.519	5.5	–
Bowling Green	11	16	.407	8.5	–
Akron	8	18	.407	11	–
Buffalo	6	21	.222	13.5	–
West Division
Central Michigan	17	9	.654	–	2
Ball State	16	9	.640	.5	3
Western Michigan	16	9	.640	.5	4
Eastern Michigan	14	12	.538	3	6
Toledo	11	15	.423	6	–
Northern Illinois	8	18	.308	9	–

== Results ==
First round
1	Kent State	2
6	Eastern Michigan	1
3	Ball State	6
4	Western Michigan	2
2	Central Michigan	8
5	Miami	2

Second round
1	Kent State	4
4	Western Michigan	3
3	Ball State	12
2	Central Michigan	5
6	Eastern Michigan	2
5	Miami	11

Third round
1	Kent State	4*
3	Ball State	5*
2	Central Michigan	3
5	Miami	6

Semifinals
1	Kent State	11
5	Miami	1

Final
3	Ball State	7	—
1	Kent State	4	—

* - Indicates game required 11 innings.

== All-Tournament Team ==
The following players were named to the All-Tournament Team.

Name	School
Kyle Dygert	Ball State
Eric Earnhart	Ball State
Kyle Heyne	Ball State
Chris Pestle	Ball State
Justin Rogers	Ball State
Andrew Davis	Kent State
Kurt Eichorn	Kent State
Chad Wagler	Kent State
Noah Lankford	Central Michigan
Eric Darlage	Miami

=== Most Valuable Player ===
Kyle Dygert was named Tournament Most Valuable Player. Dygert played for Ball State.
