= 1998 Mid-American Conference baseball tournament =

American collegiate baseball tournament

- Teams: 6
- Format: Double-elimination
- Finals site: Warren E. Steller Field; Bowling Green, OH
- Champions: Bowling Green (1st title)
- Winning coach: Danny Schmitz (1st title)
- MVP: Bob Niemet (Bowling Green)

1998 Mid-American Conference baseball standings
	Conf.						Overall
Team	W		L		T	PCT	W		L		T	PCT
East
Bowling Green ^{x}‍‍‡‍^{y}	17	–	10	–	0	.630	34	–	21	–	0	.618
Kent State ‍‍‍	17	–	12	–	0	.586	27	–	28	–	0	.491
Miami ‍‍‍	17	–	13	–	0	.567	33	–	26	–	0	.559
Ohio ‍‍‍	13	–	17	–	0	.433	31	–	24	–	0	.564
Akron ‍‍‍	10	–	18	–	0	.357	20	–	31	–	0	.392
Marshall ‍‍‍	9	–	21	–	0	.300	18	–	35	–	0	.340
West
Ball State ^{x}‍‍‍	23	–	8	–	0	.742	39	–	18	–	0	.684
Central Michigan ‍‍‍	23	–	9	–	0	.719	34	–	25	–	0	.576
Western Michigan ‍‍‍	16	–	16	–	0	.500	26	–	29	–	0	.473
Eastern Michigan ‍‍‍	14	–	16	–	0	.467	27	–	27	–	0	.500
Toledo ‍‍‍	13	–	17	–	0	.433	20	–	32	–	0	.385
Northern Illinois ‍‍‍	8	–	23	–	0	.258	10	–	30	–	1	.256
† – Conference champion ‡ – Tournament champion y – Invited to the NCAA tournament As of June 30, 1998; Rankings from Collegiate Baseball

The 1998 Mid-American Conference baseball tournament took place in May 1998. The top three regular season finishers from each division met in the double-elimination tournament held at Warren E. Steller Field on the campus of Bowling Green State University in Bowling Green, Ohio. This was the tenth Mid-American Conference postseason tournament to determine a champion. The top seed from the east, Bowling Green, won their first tournament championship to earn the conference's automatic bid to the 1998 NCAA Division I baseball tournament.

== Seeding and format ==
The top three finishers in each division, based on conference winning percentage only, participated in the tournament. The top seed in each division played the third seed from the opposite division in the first round. The teams played double-elimination tournament. With the addition of Marshall and return of Northern Illinois to the league, the conference divided again into East and West Divisions and expanded the tournament field to six. All previous tournaments consisted of four participating teams.

Team	W	L	PCT	GB	Seed
East Division
Bowling Green	17	10	.630	–	1E
Kent State	17	12	.586	1	2E
Miami	17	13	.567	1.5	3E
Ohio	13	17	.433	5.5	–
Akron	10	18	.357	7.5	–
Marshall	9	21	.300	9.5	–
West Division
Ball State	23	8	.742	–	1W
Central Michigan	23	9	.719	.5	2W
Western Michigan	16	16	.500	7.5	3W
Eastern Michigan	14	16	.467	8.5	–
Toledo	13	17	.433	10.5	–
Northern Illinois	8	23	.258	15	–

== Results ==
First round
1E	Bowling Green	9
3W	Western Michigan	7
2W	Ball State	4
2E	Miami	7
1W	Central Michigan	8
3E	Kent State	0

Second round
1E	Bowling Green	3
3E	Kent State	1
2E	Miami	6
1W	Central Michigan	5
3W	Western Michigan	3
2W	Ball State	2

Third round
1E	Bowling Green	6
2E	Miami	11
1W	Central Michigan	3
3W	Western Michigan	7

Semifinals
1E	Bowling Green	10
3W	Western Michigan	1

Final
2E	Miami	0	6
1E	Bowling Green	6	7

== All-Tournament Team ==
The following players were named to the All-Tournament Team.

Name	School
Jason Kelley	Bowling Green
Ben Everside	Miami
Jay Harrington	Bowling Green
John Lackaff	Miami
Bob Niemet	Bowling Green
Drew Niles	Bowling Green
Kris Gundrum	Western Michigan
Matt Mlynarek	Bowling Green
John Sullivan	Miami
Alan Gilhousen	Bowling Green

=== Most Valuable Player ===
Bob Niemet won the Tournament Most Valuable Player award. Niemet played for Bowling Green.
