= 1999 Mid-American Conference baseball tournament =

American collegiate baseball tournament

- Teams: 6
- Format: Double-elimination
- Finals site: Ball Diamond; Muncie, IN
- Champions: Bowling Green (2nd title)
- Winning coach: Danny Schmitz (2nd title)
- MVP: Sean Ryan (Bowling Green)

1999 Mid-American Conference baseball standings
	Conf.						Overall
Team	W		L		T	PCT	W		L		T	PCT
East
Bowling Green ^{x}‍‍‡‍^{y}	21	–	10	–	0	.677	36	–	24	–	0	.600
Miami ‍‍‍	20	–	12	–	0	.625	34	–	27	–	0	.557
Kent State ‍‍‍	19	–	12	–	0	.613	33	–	25	–	0	.569
Ohio ‍‍‍	17	–	13	–	0	.567	26	–	28	–	0	.481
Akron ‍‍‍	10	–	22	–	0	.313	10	–	22	–	0	.313
Marshall ‍‍‍	4	–	26	–	1	.145	12	–	43	–	1	.223
West
Ball State ^{x}‍‍‍	25	–	6	–	0	.806	42	–	18	–	0	.700
Toledo ‍‍‍	23	–	9	–	0	.719	39	–	20	–	0	.661
Western Michigan ‍‍‍	20	–	12	–	0	.625	30	–	28	–	0	.517
Central Michigan ‍‍‍	15	–	15	–	0	.500	24	–	32	–	0	.429
Eastern Michigan ‍‍‍	12	–	19	–	1	.391	21	–	32	–	1	.398
Northern Illinois ‍‍‍	1	–	31	–	0	.031	4	–	51	–	1	.080
† – Conference champion ‡ – Tournament champion y – Invited to the NCAA tournament As of June 30, 1999; Rankings from Collegiate Baseball

The 1999 Mid-American Conference baseball tournament took place in May 1999. The top three regular season finishers from each division met in the double-elimination tournament held at Ball Diamond on the campus of Ball State University in Muncie, Indiana. This was the eleventh Mid-American Conference postseason tournament to determine a champion. The top seed from the west, Bowling Green, won their second consecutive, and second overall, tournament championship to earn the conference's automatic bid to the 1999 NCAA Division I baseball tournament.

== Seeding and format ==
The top three finishers in each division, based on conference winning percentage only, participated in the tournament. The top seed in each division played the third seed from the opposite division in the first round. The teams played double-elimination tournament. This was the second year of the six team tournament.

Team	W	L	T	PCT	GB	Seed
East Division
Bowling Green	21	10	0	.688	–	1E
Miami	20	12	0	.625	1.5	2E
Kent State	19	12	0	.613	2	3E
Ohio	17	13	0	.567	3.5	–
Akron	10	22	0	.313	11.5	–
Marshall	4	26	1	.141	16	–
West Division
Ball State	25	6	0	.806	–	1W
Toledo	23	9	0	.719	2.5	2W
Western Michigan	20	12	0	.625	5.5	3W
Central Michigan	15	15	0	.500	9.5	–
Eastern Michigan	12	19	1	.387	13	–
Northern Illinois	1	31	0	.031	25.5	–

== Results ==
First round
1W	Ball State	4
3E	Kent State	1
2W	Toledo	3
2E	Miami	0
1E	Bowling Green	6
3W	Western Michigan	1

Second round
1W	Ball State	2
2E	Miami	4
3E	Kent State	7
3W	Western Michigan	5
2W	Toledo	2
1E	Bowling Green	15
1W	Ball State	10
2W	Toledo	1

Third round
2E	Miami	9
3E	Kent State	7
1E	Bowling Green	8
1W	Ball State	7

Final
2E	Miami	12	4*
1E	Bowling Green	2	5*

* - Indicates game was suspended after 8 innings due to weather.

== All-Tournament Team ==
The following players were named to the All-Tournament Team.

Name	School
Jeremy Griffiths	Toledo
Jason Kelley	Bowling Green
Matt Marcum	Bowling Green
Bob Niemet	Bowling Green
Mark Thewes	Miami
Jeremy Ison	Miami
Sean Ryan	Bowling Green
Aric Christman	Bowling Green
D.J. Eckhart	Miami
Clark Mace	Miami

=== Most Valuable Player ===
Sean Ryan won the Tournament Most Valuable Player award. Ryan played for Bowling Green.
