= 1996 Mid-American Conference baseball tournament =

American collegiate baseball tournament

- Teams: 4
- Format: Double-elimination
- Finals site: Gene Michael Field; Kent, OH
- Champions: Akron (1st title)
- Winning coach: Dave Fross (1st title)
- MVP: Dave Yoder (Akron)

1996 Mid-American Conference baseball standings
	Conf.						Overall
Team	W		L		T	PCT	W		L		T	PCT
Kent State ‍†‍‍	21	–	7	–	0	.750	30	–	20	–	0	.600
Ohio ‍‍‍	21	–	11	–	0	.656	34	–	23	–	0	.596
Toledo ‍‍‍	18	–	14	–	0	.563	27	–	27	–	0	.500
Akron ‍‍‡‍^{y}	18	–	14	–	0	.563	37	–	23	–	0	.617
Ball State ‍‍‍	16	–	14	–	0	.533	32	–	20	–	1	.613
Central Michigan ‍‍‍	16	–	14	–	0	.533	31	–	20	–	0	.608
Eastern Michigan ‍‍‍	16	–	16	–	0	.500	26	–	29	–	0	.473
Bowling Green ‍‍‍	14	–	17	–	0	.452	28	–	22	–	0	.560
Western Michigan ‍‍‍	10	–	21	–	0	.323	17	–	34	–	0	.333
Miami ‍‍‍	5	–	27	–	0	.156	12	–	40	–	0	.231
† – Conference champion ‡ – Tournament champion y – Invited to the NCAA tournament As of June 30, 1996; Rankings from Collegiate Baseball

The 1996 Mid-American Conference baseball tournament took place in May 1996. The top four regular season finishers met in the double-elimination tournament held at Gene Michael Field on the campus of Kent State University in Kent, Ohio. This was the eighth Mid-American Conference postseason tournament to determine a champion. Fourth seeded Akron won their first tournament championship to earn the conference's automatic bid to the 1996 NCAA Division I baseball tournament.

== Seeding and format ==
The top four finishers based on conference winning percentage only, participated in the tournament. The teams played double-elimination tournament. Toledo claimed the third seed over Akron by tiebreaker.

Team	W	L	PCT	GB	Seed
Kent State	21	7	.750	–	1
Ohio	21	11	.656	2	2
Toledo	18	14	.563	5	3
Akron	18	14	.563	5	4
Ball State	16	14	.533	6	–
Central Michigan	16	14	.533	6	–
Eastern Michigan	16	16	.500	7	–
Bowling Green	14	17	.452	8.5	–
Western Michigan	10	21	.323	12.5	–
Miami	5	27	.156	18	–

== Results ==
Upper round 1
1	Kent State	1
4	Akron	4
2	Ohio	3
3	Toledo	2
Lower round 1
1	Kent State	2
3	Toledo	7

Upper final
4	Akron	6
2	Ohio	4
Lower final
2	Ohio	6
3	Toledo	4

Final
4	Akron
2	Ohio

== All-Tournament Team ==
The following players were named to the All-Tournament Team.

Name	School
Todd Maynard	Akron
Brady Gick	Ohio
Jay Bartos	Akron
Ron Warga	Toledo
Steve Smetana	Kent State
Damon Wilcox	Ohio
Dave Yoder	Akron
Mike Goldstein	Ohio
Brian Petrucci	Akron
Mike Doerbecker	Akron

=== Most Valuable Player ===
Dave Yoder won the Tournament Most Valuable Player award. Yoder played for Akron.
