= 1997 Mid-American Conference baseball tournament =

American collegiate baseball tournament

- Teams: 4
- Format: Double-elimination
- Finals site: Trautwein Field; Athens, OH
- Champions: Ohio (1st title)
- Winning coach: Joe Carbone (1st title)
- MVP: Bart Leahy (Ohio)

1997 Mid-American Conference baseball standings
	Conf.				Overall
Team	W		L	PCT	W		L	PCT
Ohio ‍†‍‡‍^{y}	22	–	9	.710	43	–	18	.705
Ball State ‍‍‍	21	–	10	.677	40	–	19	.678
Kent State ‍‍‍	18	–	13	.581	29	–	28	.509
Miami ‍‍‍	17	–	13	.567	27	–	28	.491
Eastern Michigan ‍‍‍	17	–	14	.548	29	–	25	.537
Central Michigan ‍‍‍	14	–	14	.500	29	–	20	.592
Akron ‍‍‍	31	–	23	.574	14	–	16	.467
Bowling Green ‍‍‍	13	–	17	.433	24	–	27	.471
Toledo ‍‍‍	9	–	20	.310	18	–	33	.353
Western Michigan ‍‍‍	6	–	24	.200	14	–	39	.264
† – Conference champion ‡ – Tournament champion y – Invited to the NCAA tournament As of June 30, 1997; Rankings from Collegiate Baseball

The 1997 Mid-American Conference baseball tournament took place in May 1997. The top four regular season finishers met in the double-elimination tournament held at Trautwein Field on the campus of Ohio University in Athens, Ohio. This was the ninth Mid-American Conference postseason tournament to determine a champion. Top seeded Ohio won their first tournament championship to earn the conference's automatic bid to the 1997 NCAA Division I baseball tournament.

== Seeding and format ==
The top four finishers based on conference winning percentage only, participated in the tournament. The teams played double-elimination tournament. This was the final year of the four team format, as the field expanded to six teams in 1998.

Team	W	L	PCT	GB	Seed
Ohio	22	9	.710	–	1
Ball State	21	10	.677	1	2
Kent State	18	13	.581	4	3
Miami	17	13	.567	4.5	4
Eastern Michigan	17	14	.548	5	–
Central Michigan	14	14	.500	6.5	–
Akron	14	16	.467	7.5	–
Bowling Green	13	17	.433	8.5	–
Toledo	9	20	.310	12	–
Western Michigan	6	24	.200	15.5	–

== Results ==
Upper round 1
1	Ohio	23
4	Miami	4
2	Ball State	17
3	Kent State	5
Lower round 1
4	Miami	6
3	Kent State	9

Upper final
1	Ohio	9
2	Ball State	6
Lower final
2	Ball State	10
3	Kent State	18

Final
1	Ohio
3	Kent State

== All-Tournament Team ==
The following players were named to the All-Tournament Team.

Name	School
Matt Guerrier	Kent State
Brady Gick	Ohio
Ed Farris	Ball State
Cary Zamilski	Kent State
Brian Dorrmann	Ball State
Damon Wilcox	Ohio
Jason Graham	Ohio
Andy Roseberry	Kent State
Jason Meier	Ball State
Bart Leahy	Ohio

=== Most Valuable Player ===
Bart Leahy won the Tournament Most Valuable Player award. Leahy played for Ohio.
