= 1995 Mid-American Conference baseball tournament =

American collegiate baseball tournament

- Teams: 4
- Format: Double-elimination
- Finals site: Warren E. Steller Field; Bowling Green, OH
- Champions: Central Michigan (2nd title)
- Winning coach: Dean Kreiner (2nd title)
- MVP: Pat Mahoney (Central Michigan)

1995 Mid-American Conference baseball standings
| | Conf. | | | | | | Overall |
| Team | W | | L | | T | PCT | W | | L | | T | PCT |
|---|---|---|---|---|---|---|---|---|---|---|---|---|
| Bowling Green ‍†‍‍ | 22 | – | 8 | – | 0 | .733 | 34 | – | 20 | – | 0 | .630 |
| Kent State ‍‍‍ | 19 | – | 10 | – | 0 | .655 | 40 | – | 19 | – | 0 | .678 |
| Central Michigan ‍‍‡‍^{y} | 19 | – | 12 | – | 0 | .613 | 41 | – | 19 | – | 0 | .683 |
| Akron ‍‍‍ | 18 | – | 12 | – | 0 | .600 | 26 | – | 22 | – | 0 | .542 |
| Western Michigan ‍‍‍ | 19 | – | 13 | – | 0 | .594 | 31 | – | 22 | – | 1 | .583 |
| Eastern Michigan ‍‍‍ | 18 | – | 13 | – | 0 | .581 | 22 | – | 31 | – | 0 | .415 |
| Ohio ‍‍‍ | 15 | – | 17 | – | 0 | .469 | 31 | – | 25 | – | 0 | .554 |
| Toledo ‍‍‍ | 9 | – | 21 | – | 0 | .300 | 21 | – | 32 | – | 0 | .396 |
| Miami ‍‍‍ | 8 | – | 23 | – | 0 | .258 | 21 | – | 35 | – | 0 | .375 |
| Ball State ‍‍‍ | 7 | – | 25 | – | 0 | .219 | 15 | – | 41 | – | 0 | .268 |
† – Conference champion ‡ – Tournament champion y – Invited to the NCAA tournament As of June 30, 1995; Rankings from Collegiate Baseball

The 1995 Mid-American Conference baseball tournament took place in May 1995. The top four regular season finishers met in the double-elimination tournament held at Warren E. Steller Field on the campus of Bowling Green State University in Bowling Green, Ohio. This was the seventh Mid-American Conference postseason tournament to determine a champion. Second seeded Central Michigan won their second consecutive, and second overall, tournament championship to earn the conference's automatic bid to the 1995 NCAA Division I baseball tournament.

== Seeding and format ==
The top four finishers based on conference winning percentage only, participated in the tournament. The teams played double-elimination tournament. Central Michigan claimed the fourth seed over Western Michigan by tiebreaker.

| Team | W | L | PCT | GB | Seed |
|---|---|---|---|---|---|
| Bowling Green | 22 | 8 | .733 | – | 1 |
| Kent State | 19 | 10 | .655 | 2.5 | 2 |
| Central Michigan | 19 | 12 | .613 | 3.5 | 3 |
| Akron | 18 | 12 | .600 | 4 | 4 |
| Western Michigan | 19 | 13 | .594 | 4 | – |
| Eastern Michigan | 18 | 13 | .581 | 4.5 | – |
| Ohio | 15 | 17 | .469 | 8 | – |
| Toledo | 9 | 21 | .300 | 13 | – |
| Miami | 8 | 23 | .258 | 14.5 | – |
| Ball State | 7 | 25 | .219 | 16 | – |

== Results ==
Upper round 1
1 | Bowling Green | 5
4 | Akron | 6
2 | Kent State | 0
3 | Central Michigan | 3
Lower round 1
1 | Bowling Green | 2
2 | Kent State | 5

Upper final
4 | Akron | 8
3 | Central Michigan | 16
Lower final
4 | Akron | 3
2 | Kent State | 16

Final
3 | Central Michigan
2 | Kent State

== All-Tournament Team ==
The following players were named to the All-Tournament Team.

| Name | School |
|---|---|
| Lee Gardner | Central Michigan |
| Pat Mahoney | Central Michigan |
| Steve Smetana | Kent State |
| E.J. Eckert | Akron |
| Tim Fails | Kent State |
| Mike Combs | Bowling Green |
| Toby Kominek | Central Michigan |
| Art Mighton | Kent State |
| Jerome Kynard | Bowling Green |
| Ted Rose | Kent State |

=== Most Valuable Player ===
Pat Mahoney won the Tournament Most Valuable Player award. Mahoney played for Central Michigan.
