= 2005 Mid-American Conference baseball tournament =

American collegiate baseball tournament

- Teams: 6
- Format: Double-elimination
- Finals site: Hayden Park; Oxford, OH
- Champions: Miami (3rd title)
- Winning coach: Tracy Smith (2nd title)
- MVP: Paul Freitch (Miami)

2005 Mid-American Conference baseball standings
	Conf.						Overall
Team	W		L		T	PCT	W		L		T	PCT
East
Miami ^{x}‍‍‡‍^{y}	17	–	5	–	0	.773	45	–	18	–	0	.714
Akron ‍‍‍	11	–	8	–	0	.579	25	–	29	–	0	.463
Ohio ‍‍‍	9	–	10	–	1	.475	25	–	25	–	1	.500
Kent State ‍‍‍	9	–	10	–	0	.474	33	–	20	–	0	.623
Marshall ‍‍‍	8	–	16	–	0	.333	16	–	34	–	0	.320
Buffalo ‍‍‍	5	–	14	–	1	.275	19	–	30	–	1	.390
West
Ball State ^{x}‍‍‍	17	–	5	–	0	.773	38	–	18	–	0	.679
Central Michigan ‍‍‍	18	–	6	–	0	.750	42	–	18	–	0	.700
Bowling Green ‍‍‍	12	–	8	–	0	.600	33	–	18	–	0	.647
Western Michigan ‍‍‍	13	–	9	–	0	.591	26	–	24	–	0	.520
Eastern Michigan ‍‍‍	8	–	14	–	0	.364	22	–	34	–	0	.393
Northern Illinois ‍‍‍	6	–	18	–	0	.250	16	–	36	–	1	.311
Toledo ‍‍‍	5	–	17	–	0	.227	15	–	39	–	0	.278
† – Conference champion ‡ – Tournament champion y – Invited to the NCAA tournament As of June 30, 2005; Rankings from Collegiate Baseball

The 2005 Mid-American Conference baseball tournament took place in May 2005. The top six regular season finishers met in the double-elimination tournament held at Stanley G. McKie Field at Joseph P. Hayden Jr. Park on the campus of Miami University in Oxford, Ohio. This was the seventeenth Mid-American Conference postseason tournament to determine a champion. Top seed Miami won their third tournament championship to earn the conference's automatic bid to the 2005 NCAA Division I baseball tournament.

== Seeding and format ==
The winner of each division claimed the top two seeds, while the next four finishers based on conference winning percentage only, regardless of division, participated in the tournament. The teams played double-elimination tournament. This was the eighth year of the six team tournament.

Team	W	L	T	PCT	GB	Seed
East Division
Miami	17	5	0	.773	–	1
Akron	11	8	0	.579	4.5	6
Ohio	9	10	1	.475	6	–
Kent State	9	10	0	.474	6.5	–
Marshall	8	16	0	.333	10	–
Buffalo	5	14	1	.275	11.5	–
West Division
Ball State	17	5	0	.773	–	2
Central Michigan	18	6	0	.750	–	3
Western Michigan	13	9	0	.591	4	4
Bowling Green	12	8	0	.600	4	5
Eastern Michigan	8	14	0	.364	9	—
Northern Illinois	6	18	0	.250	12	—
Toledo	5	17	0	.227	12	–

== Results ==
First round
1	Miami	2
6	Akron	0
3	Central Michigan	5
4	Western Michigan	4
2	Ball State	5*
5	Bowling Green	4*

Second round
2	Miami	9*
4	Western Michigan	5*
3	Central Michigan	8
2	Ball State	7
6	Akron	3
5	Bowling Green	0

Third round
1	Miami	0
3	Central Michigan	5
2	Ball State	6
6	Akron	3

Semifinals
1	Miami	9
2	Ball State	3

Final
3	Central Michigan	2	6
1	Miami	5	10

* - Indicates game required 11 innings.

== All-Tournament Team ==
The following players were named to the All-Tournament Team.

Name	School
Brad Miller	Ball State
Eric Earnhart	Ball State
Troy Moratti	Central Michigan
Bryan Mitzel	Central Michigan
Jim Geldoff	Central Michigan
Brian Canada	Miami
John Ely	Miami
Michael Moljewski	Miami
Keith Wesier	Miami
Paul Frietch	Miami

=== Most Valuable Player ===
Paul Frietch was named Tournament Most Valuable Player. Frietch played for Miami.
