= 2008 Mid-American Conference baseball tournament =

American collegiate baseball tournament

- Teams: 8
- Format: Double-elimination
- Finals site: V.A. Memorial Stadium; Chillicothe, OH
- Champions: Eastern Michigan (4th title)
- Winning coach: Jake Boss (1st title)
- MVP: Jack Leonard (Eastern Michigan)

2008 Mid-American Conference baseball standings
	Conf.				Overall
Team	W		L	PCT	W		L	PCT
East
Kent State ^{x}‍‍‍	16	–	8	.667	36	–	21	.632
Bowling Green ‍‍‍	16	–	8	.667	32	–	20	.615
Ohio ‍‍‍	14	–	13	.519	29	–	30	.492
Akron ‍‍‍	8	–	13	.381	25	–	24	.510
Miami ‍‍‍	8	–	19	.296	18	–	36	.333
Buffalo ‍‍‍	7	–	19	.269	14	–	38	.269
West
Eastern Michigan ^{x}‍‍‡‍^{y}	15	–	8	.652	25	–	32	.439
Northern Illinois ‍‍‍	16	–	10	.615	28	–	26	.519
Ball State ‍‍‍	12	–	11	.522	28	–	25	.528
Western Michigan ‍‍‍	12	–	12	.500	29	–	23	.558
Central Michigan ‍‍‍	13	–	13	.500	29	–	27	.518
Toledo ‍‍‍	10	–	13	.435	18	–	31	.367
† – Conference champion ‡ – Tournament champion y – Invited to the NCAA tournament As of June 30, 2008; Rankings from Collegiate Baseball

The 2008 Mid-American Conference baseball tournament took place in May 2008. The top eight regular season finishers met in the double-elimination tournament held at V.A. Memorial Stadium in Chillicothe, Ohio. This was the twentieth Mid-American Conference postseason tournament to determine a champion, and the first to be held at a neutral site. Second seed Eastern Michigan won their fourth tournament championship to earn the conference's automatic bid to the 2008 NCAA Division I baseball tournament.

== Seeding and format ==
The winner of each division claimed the top two seeds, while the next six finishers based on conference winning percentage only, regardless of division, participated in the tournament. The teams played a two-bracket, double-elimination tournament with the winner of each bracket facing off in a single championship game. This was the first year of the eight-team tournament.

Team	W	L	PCT	GB	Seed
East Division
Kent State	16	8	.667	–	1
Bowling Green	16	8	.667	–	3
Ohio	14	13	.519	3.5	6
Akron	8	13	.381	6.5	–
Miami	8	19	.296	9.5	–
Buffalo	7	19	.269	10	–
West Division
Eastern Michigan	15	8	.652	–	2
Northern Illinois	16	10	.615	1.5	4
Ball State	12	11	.522	3	5
Western Michigan	12	12	.500	3.5	7
Central Michigan	13	13	.500	3.5	8
Toledo	10	13	.435	5	–

== Results ==
First round
1	Kent State	4
8	Central Michigan	2
4	Northern Illinois	13
5	Ball State	7
8	Central Michigan	5
5	Ball State	7
3	Bowling Green	5
6	Ohio	4
2	Eastern Michigan	8
7	Western Michigan	5
6	Ohio	5
7	Western Michigan	4

Second round
1	Kent State	10
4	Northern Illinois	6
4	Northern Illinois	6
5	Ball State	5
3	Bowling Green	4
2	Eastern Michigan	11
3	Bowling Green	3
6	Ohio	7

Semifinals
1	Kent State	10	—
4	Northern Illinois	3	—
2	Eastern Michigan	9	—
6	Ohio	3	—

Final
1	Kent State	4
2	Eastern Michigan	12

== All-Tournament Team ==
The following players were named to the All-Tournament Team.

Name	School
Matt Stoeklen	Ball State
Dave Reynolds	Northern Illinois
Chris Rigo	Ohio
Greg Rohan	Kent State
Brad Stillings	Kent State
Doug Sanders	Kent State
Josh Ivan	Eastern Michigan
Steve Bradshaw	Eastern Michigan
Sean Hoffman	Eastern Michigan
Zack Leonard	Eastern Michigan

=== Most Valuable Player ===
Zack Leonard was named Tournament Most Valuable Player. Leonard played for Eastern Michigan.
