= 2011 Mid-American Conference baseball tournament =

American collegiate baseball tournament

- Teams: 8
- Format: Double-elimination
- Finals site: V.A. Memorial Stadium; Chillicothe, OH
- Champions: Kent State (9th title)
- Winning coach: Scott Stricklin (4th title)
- MVP: David Starn (Kent State)

2011 Mid-American Conference baseball standings
	Conf.				Overall
Team	W		L	PCT	W		L	PCT
East Division
No. 26 Kent State ^{x}‍‍‡‍^{y}	21	–	5	.808	45	–	17	.726
Miami ‍‍‍	18	–	9	.667	35	–	25	.583
Bowling Green ‍‍‍	11	–	14	.440	20	–	31	.392
Ohio ‍‍‍	11	–	16	.407	27	–	27	.500
Akron ‍‍‍	7	–	20	.259	16	–	37	.302
Buffalo ‍‍‍	3	–	22	.120	14	–	38	.269
West Division
Central Michigan ^{x}‍‍‍	17	–	9	.654	31	–	27	.534
Eastern Michigan ‍‍‍	16	–	11	.593	37	–	22	.627
Northern Illinois ‍‍‍	16	–	11	.593	30	–	27	.526
Toledo ‍‍‍	15	–	12	.556	26	–	29	.473
Western Michigan ‍‍‍	12	–	14	.462	26	–	31	.456
Ball State ‍‍‍	11	–	15	.423	15	–	35	.300
x – Division champion ‡ – Tournament champion y – Invited to the NCAA tournament As of June 7, 2011; Rankings from Collegiate Baseball

The 2011 Mid-American Conference baseball tournament took place from May 25 through 28. The top eight regular season finishers of the league's twelve teams, regardless of division, met in the double-elimination tournament held at V.A. Memorial Stadium in Chillicothe, Ohio. Kent State won their third consecutive tournament, and ninth overall, to earn the conference's automatic bid to the 2011 NCAA Division I baseball tournament.

== Seeding ==
The winners of each division claim the top two seeds, with the next six teams, based on conference winning percentage claim the third through eight seeds. The teams then play a two bracket, double-elimination tournament leading to a final matching the winners of each bracket.

Team	W	L	PCT	GB	Seed
East Division
Kent State	21	5	.808	–	1
Miami	18	9	.667	3.5	3
Bowling Green	11	14	.440	9.5	8
Ohio	11	16	.407	10.5	–
Akron	7	20	.259	14.5	–
Buffalo	3	22	.120	18	–
West Division
Central Michigan	17	9	.654	–	2
Eastern Michigan	16	11	.593	1.5	4
Northern Illinois	16	11	.593	1.5	5
Toledo	15	12	.556	2.5	6
Western Michigan	12	14	.462	5	7
Ball State	11	15	.423	6	–

== Results ==
First round
1	Kent State	6
8	Bowling Green	2
4	Eastern Michigan	4
5	Northern Illinois	2
8	Bowling Green	2
5	Northern Illinois	4
3	Miami	3
6	Toledo	1
2	Central Michigan	7
7	Western Michigan	9
6	Toledo	8
2	Central Michigan	9

Second round
1	Kent State	5
4	Eastern Michigan	4
4	Eastern Michigan	12
5	Northern Illinois	11
3	Miami	12
7	Western Michigan	2
7	Western Michigan	12
2	Central Michigan	13

Semifinals
1	Kent State	2	8
4	Eastern Michigan	4	0
3	Miami	5	—
2	Central Michigan	2	—

Final
1	Kent State	11
3	Miami	0

== All-Tournament Team ==
The following players were named to the All-Tournament Team.

Name	School
Nate Theunissen	Central Michigan
Tyler Hall	Central Michigan
Rob Wendzicki	Eastern Michigan
Zack Leonard	Eastern Michigan
Tyler Melling	Miami
Brooks Fiala	Miami
David Starn	Kent State
Evan Campbell	Kent State
Andrew Chafin	Kent State
David Lyon	Kent State

=== Most Valuable Player ===
David Starn won the Tournament Most Valuable Player award. Starn was a pitcher for Kent State.
