= 2010 Mid-American Conference baseball tournament =

American collegiate baseball tournament

- Teams: 8
- Format: Double-elimination
- Finals site: V.A. Memorial Stadium; Chillicothe, OH
- Champions: Kent State (8th title)
- Winning coach: Scott Stricklin (3rd title)
- MVP: Justin Gill (Kent State)

2010 Mid-American Conference baseball standings
	Conf.				Overall
Team	W		L	PCT	W		L	PCT
East Division
Kent State ^{x}‍‍‡‍^{y}	18	–	9	.667	39	–	25	.609
Bowling Green ^{x}‍‍‍	18	–	9	.667	31	–	23	.574
Miami ‍‍‍	13	–	14	.481	28	–	28	.500
Ohio ‍‍‍	13	–	14	.481	20	–	35	.364
Buffalo ‍‍‍	9	–	18	.333	24	–	29	.453
Akron ‍‍‍	3	–	24	.111	21	–	34	.382
West Division
Central Michigan ^{x}‍‍‍	20	–	7	.741	36	–	22	.621
Toledo ‍‍‍	19	–	8	.704	34	–	22	.607
Ball State ‍‍‍	19	–	8	.704	29	–	29	.500
Eastern Michigan ‍‍‍	13	–	14	.481	27	–	32	.458
Northern Illinois ‍‍‍	12	–	15	.444	24	–	31	.436
Western Michigan ‍‍‍	5	–	22	.185	12	–	42	.222
x – Division champion ‡ – Tournament champion y – Invited to the 2010 NCAA Division I baseball tournament As of June 7, 2010; Rankings from Collegiate Baseball

The 2010 Mid-American Conference baseball tournament took place from May 26 through 29. The top eight regular season finishers of the league's twelve teams, regardless of division, met in the double-elimination tournament held at V.A. Memorial Stadium in Chillicothe, Ohio. Kent State won their second consecutive tournament, and eighth overall, to earn the conference's automatic bid to the 2010 NCAA Division I baseball tournament.

== Seeding ==
The winners of each division claim the top two seeds, with the next six teams, based on conference winning percentage claim the third through eight seeds. Kent State claimed the second seed by tiebreaker over Bowling Green, while Toledo claimed the third seed over Ball State. The teams played a two bracket, double-elimination tournament leading to a final matching the winners of each bracket.

Team	W	L	PCT	GB	Seed
East Division
Kent State	18	9	.667	–	2
Bowling Green	18	9	.667	–	5
Miami	13	14	.481	5	6
Ohio	13	14	.481	5	8
Buffalo	9	18	.333	9	–
Akron	3	24	.111	15	–
West Division
Central Michigan	20	7	.741	–	1
Toledo	19	8	.704	1	3
Ball State	19	8	.704	1	4
Eastern Michigan	13	14	.481	7	7
Northern Illinois	12	15	.444	8	–
Western Michigan	5	22	.185	15	–

== Results ==
First round
1	Central Michigan	13
8	Ohio	9
4	Ball State	4
5	Bowling Green	6
8	Ohio	10
4	Ball State	13
2	Kent State	4
7	Eastern Michigan	12
3	Toledo	7
6	Miami	1
2	Kent State	9
6	Miami	2

Second round
1	Central Michigan	8
5	Bowling Green	1
5	Bowling Green	7
4	Ball State	4
7	Eastern Michigan	7
3	Toledo	6
3	Toledo	3
2	Kent State	4

Semifinals
1	Central Michigan	3	9
5	Bowling Green	7	8
7	Eastern Michigan	1	8
2	Kent State	15	9

Final
1	Central Michigan	3
2	Kent State	5

== All-Tournament Team ==
The following players were named to the All-Tournament Team.

Name	School
Dennis Vaughn	Bowling Green
Todd Graves	Eastern Michigan
Andrew Marshall	Eastern Michigan
Bryce Morrow	Central Michigan
Scott Phillion	Central Michigan
James Teas	Central Michigan
Travis Shaw	Kent State
Jared Humphreys	Kent State
Ben Klafczynski	Kent State
Justin Gill	Kent State

=== Most Valuable Player ===
Justin Gill won the Tournament Most Valuable Player award. Gill was a pitcher for Kent State.
