= 2009 Mid-American Conference baseball tournament =

American collegiate baseball tournament

- Teams: 8
- Format: Double-elimination
- Finals site: V.A. Memorial Stadium; Chillicothe, OH
- Champions: Kent State (7th title)
- Winning coach: Scott Stricklin (2nd title)
- MVP: Chris Tremblay (Kent State)

2009 Mid-American Conference baseball standings
	Conf.				Overall
Team	W		L	PCT	W		L	PCT
East Division
Bowling Green ^{x}‍‍‍	18	–	8	.692	28	–	22	.560
Ohio ‍‍‍	18	–	9	.667	29	–	24	.547
Kent State ‍‍‡‍^{y}	17	–	9	.654	43	–	17	.717
Miami ‍‍‍	15	–	12	.556	30	–	25	.545
Akron ‍‍‍	12	–	15	.444	19	–	33	.365
Buffalo ‍‍‍	6	–	20	.231	20	–	35	.364
West Division
Ball State ^{x}‍‍‍	14	–	10	.583	26	–	25	.510
Toledo ‍‍‍	14	–	12	.538	24	–	30	.444
Eastern Michigan ‍‍‍	13	–	14	.481	25	–	35	.417
Central Michigan ‍‍‍	12	–	15	.444	28	–	30	.483
Northern Illinois ‍‍‍	10	–	16	.385	19	–	34	.358
Western Michigan ‍‍‍	9	–	18	.333	14	–	35	.286
x – Division champion ‡ – Tournament champion y – Invited to the 2009 NCAA Division I baseball tournament As of June 2, 2009; Rankings from Collegiate Baseball

The 2009 Mid-American Conference baseball tournament took place from May 20 through 23. The top eight regular season finishers of the league's twelve teams, regardless of division, met in the double-elimination tournament held at V.A. Memorial Stadium in Chillicothe, Ohio. Kent State won their seventh tournament championship to earn the conference's automatic bid to the 2009 NCAA Division I baseball tournament.

== Seeding ==
The winners of each division claim the top two seeds, with the next six teams, based on conference winning percentage claim the third through eight seeds. Kent State claimed the second seed by tiebreaker over Bowling Green, while Toledo claimed the third seed over Ball State. The teams played a two bracket, double-elimination tournament leading to a final matching the winners of each bracket.

Team	W	L	PCT	GB	Seed
East Division
Bowling Green	18	8	.692	–	1
Ohio	18	9	.667	.5	3
Kent State	17	9	.654	1	4
Miami	15	12	.556	3.5	5
Akron	12	15	.444	6.5	–
Buffalo	6	20	.231	12	–
West Division
Ball State	14	10	.583	–	2
Toledo	14	12	.538	1	6
Eastern Michigan	13	14	.481	2.5	7
Central Michigan	12	15	.444	3.5	8
Northern Illinois	10	16	.385	5	–
Western Michigan	9	18	.333	6.5	–

== Results ==
First round
1	Bowling Green	2
8	Central Michigan	6
4	Kent State	6
5	Miami	4
1	Bowling Green	4
5	Miami	17
2	Ball State	16
7	Eastern Michigan	19
3	Ohio	4
6	Toledo	14
2	Ball State	6
3	Ohio	15

Second round
8	Central Michigan	2
4	Kent State	17
8	Central Michigan	4
5	Miami	10
7	Eastern Michigan	6
6	Toledo	7
7	Eastern Michigan	13
3	Ohio	4

Semifinals
4	Kent State	12	—
5	Miami	8	—
6	Toledo	9	—
7	Eastern Michigan	6	—

Final
4	Kent State	5
6	Toledo	3

== All-Tournament Team ==
The following players were named to the All-Tournament Team.

Name	School
Jordan Petraitis	Miami
Kyle Rhoad	Eastern Michigan
Zack Leonard	Eastern Michigan
Chris Dudics	Toledo
Jim Vahalik	Toledo
Dan Sherwood	Toledo
Kyle Hallock	Kent State
Jimmy Rider	Kent State
Jason Patton	Kent State
Chris Tremblay	Kent State

=== Most Valuable Player ===
Chris Tremblay won the Tournament Most Valuable Player award. Tremblay was an infielder for Kent State.
