= Nouvel Catholic Central High School =

Location
- 2555 Wieneke Road; Saginaw Charter Township, Michigan 48603-2863; United States; 43°26′45″N 84°1′53″W

Information
- Type: Private high school
- Denomination: Roman Catholic
- Established: 1984
- CEEB code: 233330
- NCES School ID: 00640776
- Principal: Tim Marcineak
- Teaching staff: 22 (2016-17)
- Grades: 9–12
- Enrollment: 212 (2016-17)
- Student to teacher ratio: 9.6:1(2016-17)
- Colors: Royal Blue; Silver
- Nickname: Panthers
- Tuition: 8,000 average
- Affiliation: National Catholic Educational Association
- Website: www.nouvelcatholic.org

Nouvel Catholic Central High School is a private, Catholic high school located in Saginaw Charter Township, Michigan and serving the Saginaw region. Nouvel is a high school that enrolls approximately 150 students. The school was formed in 1984 as a consolidation of the three then-remaining Saginaw area Catholic high schools, Saints Peter and Paul, Saint Stephen's, and Saint Mary's Cathedral High Schools.

Prior to the existence of Nouvel Catholic Central High School and Saints Peter and Paul Area High School, the school building, which also houses the offices of the Roman Catholic Diocese of Saginaw, was the Saint Paul Seminary. That name is still inscribed in marble above the front door of Nouvel High School.

The school is named for Father Henri Nouvel, a 17th-century French Jesuit missionary who is locally recognized as the first European to have visited the Saginaw River Valley region. A monument recognizing Fr. Nouvel and his contributions sits on Ojibway Island in the City of Saginaw, and a local council of the Knights of Columbus established in Father Nouvel's honor has their main hall located near the school.

== Sports ==
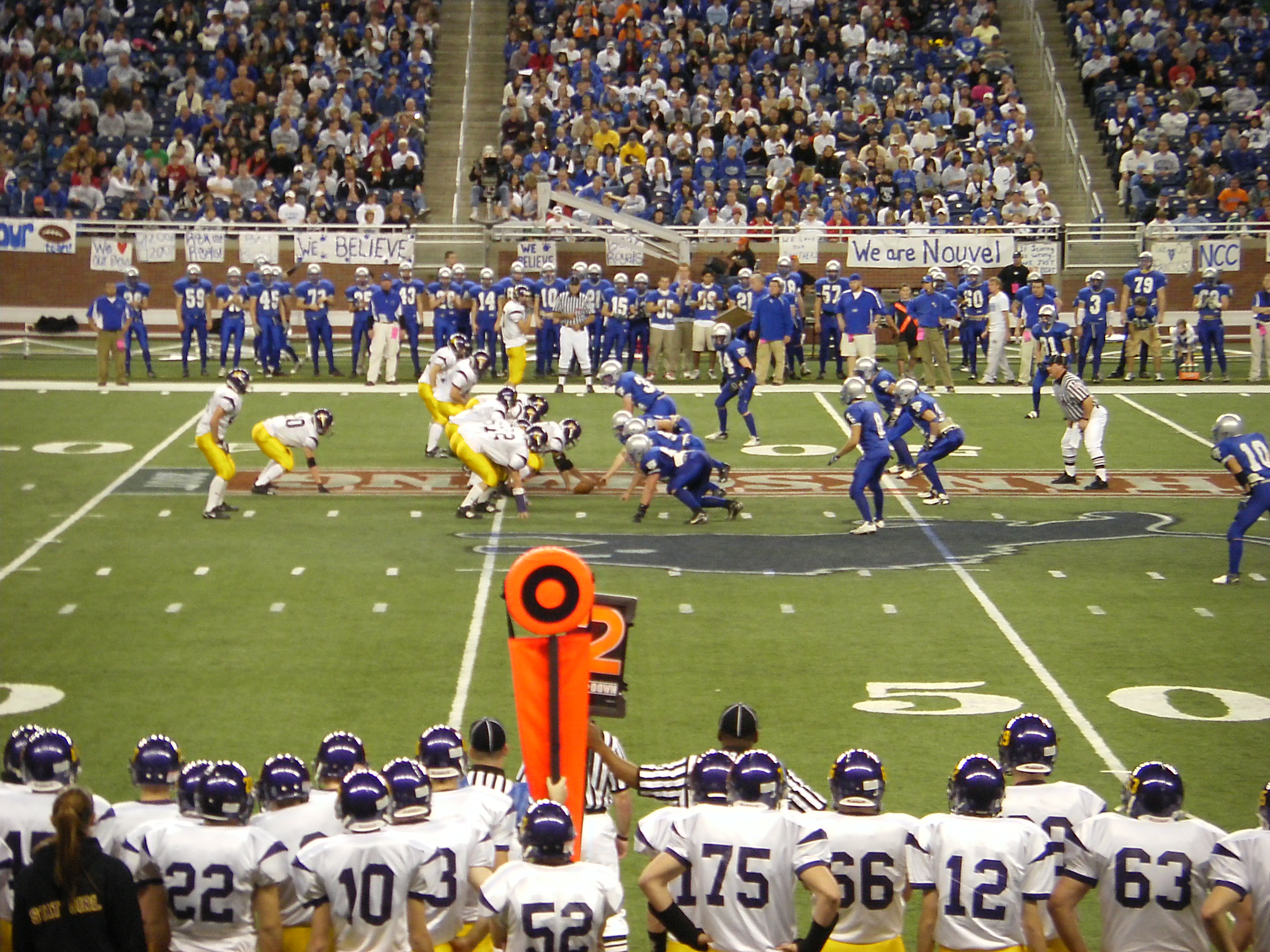
Nouvel vs. Blissfield High School, 2007 Michigan Football State Finals, Ford Field, Detroit, Michigan

In 1987, the Nouvel football team led by head coach, Leo "Smokey" Boyd, running back Tony Jackson and center Tim Novak reached the MHSAA finals at the Pontiac Silverdome for first time in school history, losing to Erie-Mason 14–7.

Nouvel has won 4 Class C state championships in boys basketball. In 1987, Nouvel defeated Benzie Central 72–59 in the championship game. Nouvel beat Roscommon 68–54 in the 1988 state championship for their second consecutive title. In 1990, Nouvel beat Ishpeming 78-59 for the championship. And in 1991, Nouvel would make it two straight state championships with a 51–37 victory over Iron River West Iron County.

Nouvel won the Class C baseball state championship in 1990, defeating Homer 10–5. In 1997, Nouvel won the Class B baseball state championship with a 3–2 victory over Dewitt. Nouvel won the Class 3 baseball state championship twice. First in 1999, with a 6–4 win over Blissfield. And in 2005, defeating Homer 7–6.

The Nouvel Panthers compete as members of the Tri-Valley Conference West Division during the regular season. Although the school has enjoyed a fair amount of athletic success, the 2006–2007 school year was arguably the school's most notable in athletic achievement. The Nouvel Football and Girls Basketball teams won State Championships, and in doing so became the first school in MHSAA history to have both teams go undefeated in the same season. The same year, Nouvel finished as State Runner-Up in Boys Basketball and a State Semifinalist in Baseball.

In the record-breaking 2007-2008 year:
The Nouvel Varsity Pom Pon team won their very first Class C State Title.
The Nouvel boys won a second straight MHSAA Division 6 state championship in football.
The Nouvel Girls Varsity Basketball team also won back to back state championships in Class C. This marks the first time in Michigan High School sports history that a school's boys football team and girls basketball team have won state titles in consecutive years.

In 2009, Jenny Ryan was named Miss Basketball, this marks the first time in MHSAA history that two people from the same school were named Miss Basketball. Danielle Kamm was named Miss Basketball in 2002 - 2003 season.

In 2011, the Nouvel Boys Varsity football team repeated as State Champions for a third time, winning the Division 7 title in a 56–26 victory. The Panthers set a state record for most points scored in a state finals football game. Running back Bennett Lewis tied the state record for scoring, with five touchdowns to his credit in the game.

In 2013, the Nouvel Varsity Pom Pon team won their second Class C State Title.

In 2014, the Nouvel Girls Basketball team won the Class C State Championship with a 62-40 victory over St. Ignace LaSalle.

Alex McCarthy was named Michigan's Mr. Bowling in 2025. McCarthy won the 2025 state title with a score of 499. McCarthy also won the state championship in 2023 with a 433 score. /

== Notable Alumni ==
Brian D'Arcy James - American actor and musician, who has received five Tony Award nominations.

Blair White - a stand-out wide receiver for the Panthers from 2000 to 2004, signed with the Indianapolis Colts following the 2010 NFL draft. White was a walk-on at Michigan State University and was named the Big Ten Wide Receiver of the Year in 2010.

Aaron Knieper - 1990 Mr. Baseball for the State of Michigan. Knieper was drafted by the Boston Red Sox in the 8th round, 227th overall in the 1990 MLB June Amateur Draft. Knieper was then drafted by the Montreal Expos in the 12th round, 342nd overall in the 1993 MLB June Amateur Draft from Central Michigan University.

Preston Murphy - Assistant Men's Basketball Coach at the University of Alabama.

Heidi Hendrick - Multi-Sport Athlete

Danielle Kamm - 2002 Miss Basketball for State of Michigan

Jenny Ryan - 2009 Miss Basketball for State of Michigan

Tony Jackson - Running back in the Canadian Football League with the BC Lions and the San Antonio Texans.

Matt Bauer - Minor league baseball pitcher in the Detroit Tigers organization. Drafted by the Detroit Tigers in 24th round, 634th overall in the 1991 MLB June Amateur Draft.

John Sullivan - Minor league baseball pitcher in the Seattle Mariners organization

James DeBardelaben - Albion College Hall of Fame for football and track and field.

== Notable Staff Alumni ==
Leo "Smokey" Boyd - Member of the 1952 Michigan State University football team that won the National Championship. Boyd was the long-time football coach, track and field coach, and athletic director.

Steve Jaksa - Former baseball coach. Also coached at Northwood University, Central Michigan University, and Saginaw Valley State University.
