= 2012 Mid-American Conference baseball tournament =

American collegiate baseball tournament

- Teams: 8
- Format: Double-elimination
- Finals site: All Pro Freight Stadium; Avon, OH
- Champions: Kent State (10th title)
- Winning coach: Scott Stricklin (5th title)
- MVP: David Starn (Kent State)

2012 Mid-American Conference baseball standings
	Conf.				Overall
Team	W		L	PCT	W		L	PCT
East Division
Kent State ^{x}‍‍‡‍^{y}	24	–	3	.889	47	–	20	.701
Ohio ‍‍‍	16	–	11	.593	28	–	29	.491
Miami ‍‍‍	12	–	15	.444	30	–	29	.508
Buffalo ‍‍‍	10	–	16	.385	20	–	36	.357
Akron ‍‍‍	10	–	17	.370	17	–	38	.309
Bowling Green ‍‍‍	9	–	18	.333	20	–	33	.377
West Division
Toledo ^{x}‍‍‍	19	–	8	.704	30	–	27	.526
Central Michigan ‍‍‍	17	–	10	.630	34	–	29	.540
Western Michigan ‍‍‍	14	–	12	.538	26	–	29	.473
Eastern Michigan ‍‍‍	14	–	13	.519	25	–	31	.446
Ball State ‍‍‍	9	–	18	.333	14	–	36	.280
Northern Illinois ‍‍‍	7	–	20	.259	15	–	40	.273
x – Division champion ‡ – Tournament champion y – Invited to the 2012 NCAA Division I baseball tournament As of May 30, 2012; Rankings from Coaches' Poll

The 2012 Mid-American Conference baseball tournament took place from May 23 through 26. The top eight regular season finishers of the league's twelve teams, regardless of division, met in the double-elimination tournament held at All Pro Freight Stadium in Avon, OH. Kent State won their fourth consecutive tournament and earned the conference's automatic bid to the 2012 NCAA Division I baseball tournament.

== Seeding ==
The winners of each division claim the top two seeds, with the next six teams, based on conference winning percentage claim the third through eight seeds. The teams then play a two bracket, double-elimination tournament leading to a final matching the winners of each bracket.

Team	W	L	PCT	GB	Seed
East Division
Kent State	24	3	.889	–	1
Ohio	16	11	.593	8	4
Miami	12	15	.444	12	7
Buffalo	10	16	.385	13.5	8
Akron	10	17	.370	14	–
Bowling Green	9	18	.333	15	–
West Division
Toledo	19	8	.704	–	2
Central Michigan	17	10	.630	2	3
Western Michigan	14	12	.538	4.5	5
Eastern Michigan	14	13	.519	5	6
Ball State	9	18	.333	10	–
Northern Illinois	7	20	.259	12	–

== Results ==
First round
1	Kent State	9
8	Buffalo	0
4	Ohio	2
5	Western Michigan	4
4	Ohio	5
8	Buffalo	6
2	Toledo	0
7	Miami	5
3	Central Michigan	3
6	Eastern Michigan	4
3	Central Michigan	4
2	Toledo	3

Second round
1	Kent State	12
5	Western Michigan	3
5	Western Michigan	8
8	Buffalo	10
6	Eastern Michigan	1
7	Miami	2
6	Eastern Michigan	4
3	Central Michigan	6

Semifinals
1	Kent State	8
8	Buffalo	3
7	Miami	10	0
3	Central Michigan	11	7

Final
1	Kent State	3
3	Central Michigan	1

== All-Tournament Team ==
The following players were named to the All-Tournament Team.

Name	School
Alex Baldock	Buffalo
Bryce Redeker	Miami
Shawn Marquardt	Miami
Mac Thoreson	Miami
Will Arnold	Central Michigan
Jordan Adams	Central Michigan
Rick Dodridge	Central Michigan
George Roberts	Kent State
David Starn	Kent State
T. J. Sutton	Kent State

=== Most Valuable Player ===
David Starn won his second consecutive Tournament Most Valuable Player award. Starn was a pitcher for Kent State.
