= 2007 Mid-American Conference baseball tournament =

American collegiate baseball tournament

- Teams: 6
- Format: Double-elimination
- Finals site: Oestrike Stadium; Ypsilanti, MI
- Champions: Kent State (6th title)
- Winning coach: Scott Stricklin (1st title)
- MVP: Jason Patton (Kent State)

2007 Mid-American Conference baseball standings
	Conf.				Overall
Team	W		L	PCT	W		L	PCT
East
Kent State ^{x}‍‍‡‍^{y}	19	–	8	.704	33	–	26	.559
Miami ‍‍‍	16	–	9	.640	32	–	24	.571
Buffalo ‍‍‍	11	–	16	.407	16	–	35	.314
Akron ‍‍‍	8	–	16	.333	23	–	24	.489
Ohio ‍‍‍	8	–	19	.296	23	–	31	.426
Bowling Green ‍‍‍	7	–	20	.259	22	–	32	.407
West
Eastern Michigan ^{x}‍‍‍	21	–	4	.840	32	–	24	.571
Central Michigan ‍‍‍	21	–	6	.778	35	–	21	.625
Northern Illinois ‍‍‍	16	–	11	.593	34	–	24	.586
Toledo ‍‍‍	14	–	13	.519	26	–	28	.481
Western Michigan ‍‍‍	8	–	16	.333	16	–	33	.327
Ball State ‍‍‍	8	–	19	.296	20	–	34	.370
† – Conference champion ‡ – Tournament champion y – Invited to the NCAA tournament As of June 30, 2007; Rankings from Collegiate Baseball

The 2007 Mid-American Conference baseball tournament took place in May 2007. The top six regular season finishers met in the double-elimination tournament held at Oestrike Stadium on the campus of Eastern Michigan University in Ypsilanti, Michigan. This was the nineteenth Mid-American Conference postseason tournament to determine a champion. Second seed Kent State won their sixth tournament championship to earn the conference's automatic bid to the 2007 NCAA Division I baseball tournament.

== Seeding and format ==
The winner of each division claimed the top two seeds, while the next four finishers based on conference winning percentage only, regardless of division, participated in the tournament. The teams played a double-elimination tournament. This was the tenth year of the six team tournament.

Team	W	L	PCT	GB	Seed
East Division
Kent State	19	8	.704	–	2
Miami	16	9	.640	2	4
Buffalo	11	16	.407	8	–
Akron	8	16	.333	9.5	–
Ohio	8	19	.296	11	–
Bowling Green	7	20	.259	12	–
West Division
Eastern Michigan	21	4	.840	–	1
Central Michigan	21	6	.778	1	3
Northern Illinois	16	11	.593	6	5
Toledo	14	13	.519	8	6
Western Michigan	8	16	.333	12.5	–
Ball State	8	19	.296	14	–

== Results ==
First round
1	Eastern Michigan	6
6	Toledo	5
3	Central Michigan	4
4	Miami	8
2	Kent State	7
5	Northern Illinois	3

Second round
1	Eastern Michigan	12
3	Central Michigan	6
4	Miami	3
2	Kent State	4
6	Toledo	10
5	Northern Illinois	11

Third round
1	Eastern Michigan	2
2	Kent State	3
4	Miami	4
5	Northern Illinois	6

Semifinals
1	Eastern Michigan	9
5	Northern Illinois	3

Final
2	Kent State	3	—
1	Eastern Michigan	2	—

== All-Tournament Team ==
The following players were named to the All-Tournament Team.

Name	School
Jason Patton	Kent State
Reid Lamport	Kent State
Will Vazquez	Kent State
Andrew Davis	Kent State
Kyle Smith	Kent State
Matt German	Northern Illinois
Jordan Petraitis	Miami
Kyle Rhoad	Eastern Michigan
Jeff Hehr	Eastern Michigan
Jeff Fischer	Eastern Michigan

=== Most Valuable Player ===
Jason Patton was named Tournament Most Valuable Player. Patton played for Kent State.
