= 2016 Mid-American Conference baseball tournament =

American collegiate baseball tournament

- Teams: 8
- Format: Double-elimination
- Finals site: All Pro Freight Stadium; Avon, Ohio
- Champions: Western Michigan (1st title)
- Winning coach: Billy Gernon (1st title)
- MVP: Keegan Akin (Western Michigan)
- Television: ESPN3

2016 Mid-American Conference baseball standings
	Conf.						Overall
Team	W		L		T	PCT	W		L		T	PCT
East Division
Kent State ^{x}‍‍‍	20	–	4	–	0	.833	44	–	14	–	0	.759
Miami (OH) ‍‍‍	14	–	10	–	0	.583	27	–	29	–	0	.482
Ohio ‍‍‍	8	–	16	–	0	.333	23	–	29	–	0	.442
Buffalo ‍‍‍	8	–	16	–	0	.333	21	–	31	–	0	.404
Bowling Green ‍‍‍	7	–	17	–	0	.292	17	–	37	–	0	.315
West Division
Ball State ^{x}‍‍‍	15	–	9	–	0	.625	32	–	26	–	0	.552
Northern Illinois ‍‍‍	14	–	10	–	0	.583	24	–	32	–	0	.429
Toledo ‍‍‍	13	–	11	–	0	.542	19	–	38	–	1	.336
Central Michigan ‍‍‍	12	–	12	–	0	.500	24	–	37	–	0	.393
Western Michigan ‡^{y} ‍‍‍	11	–	13	–	0	.458	22	–	34	–	0	.393
Eastern Michigan ‍‍‍	10	–	14	–	0	.417	23	–	36	–	0	.390
x – Division champion ‡ – Tournament champion y – Invited to the NCAA tournament As of June 11, 2016; Rankings from Collegiate Baseball

The 2016 Mid-American Conference baseball tournament was held May 25–29. The top eight regular season finishers of the conference's 11 teams, regardless of division, met in the double-elimination tournament held at All Pro Freight Stadium in Avon, Ohio. The seventh-seeded Western Michigan Broncos won the tournament to earn the conference's automatic bid to the 2016 NCAA Division I baseball tournament. It marked the first championship game appearance and tournament title for the Broncos.

== Seeding and format ==
The winners of each division claim the top two seeds, with the remaining six spots in the field determined by conference winning percentage, regardless of division. Teams then play a two bracket, double-elimination tournament to determine the final two teams. When two teams remain, if both teams are undefeated or have one loss, there is a one-game final. If one team has a loss and the other team is undefeated, the team with one loss must win twice.

East Division
Team	W	L	Pct	GB	Seed
Kent State	20	4	.833	—	1
Miami (OH)	14	10	.583	6	3
Ohio	8	16	.333	12	—
Buffalo	8	16	.333	12	—
Bowling Green	7	17	.292	13	—

West Division
Team	W	L	Pct	GB	Seed
Ball State	15	9	.625	—	2
Northern Illinois	14	10	.583	1	4
Toledo	13	11	.542	2	5
Central Michigan	12	12	.500	3	6
Western Michigan	11	13	.458	4	7
Eastern Michigan	10	14	.417	5	8

== Results ==
First round
1	Kent State	1
8	Eastern Michigan	0
4	Northern Illinois	7
5	Toledo	11
8	Eastern Michigan	6
4	Northern Illinois	2
2	Ball State	1
7	Western Michigan	5
3	Miami (OH)	10
6	Central Michigan	5
2	Ball State	0
6	Central Michigan	4

Second round
1	Kent State	3
5	Toledo	2
8	Eastern Michigan	6
5	Toledo	1
7	Western Michigan	10
3	Miami (OH)	6
6	Central Michigan	5
3	Miami (OH)	3

Semifinals
1	Kent State	5	4
8	Eastern Michigan	10	2
7	Western Michigan	3	4
6	Central Michigan	10	0

Final
1	Kent State	7
7	Western Michigan	12
