= Brian Bixler =

American baseball player (born 1982)

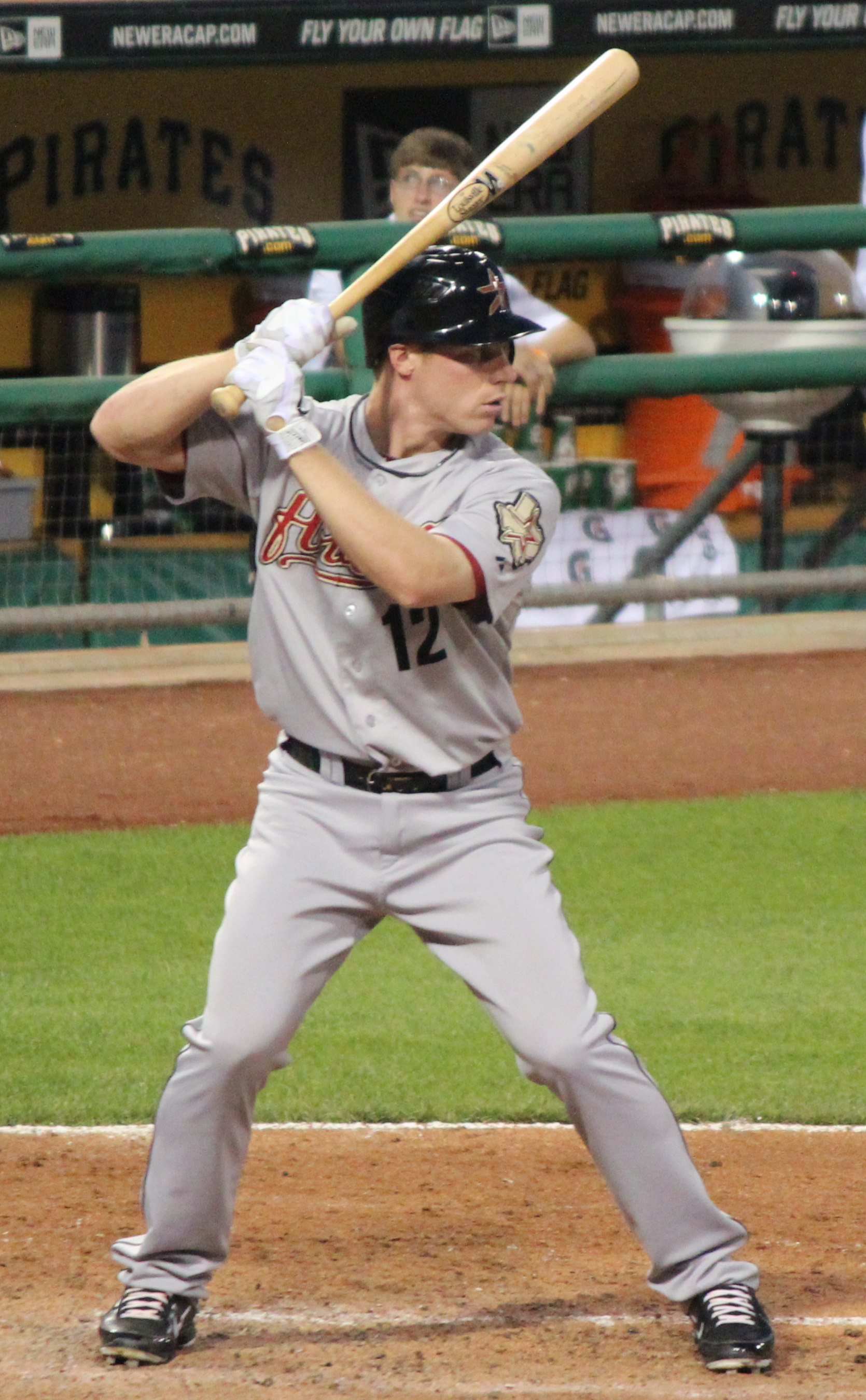
- Bixler with the Houston Astros in 2012
- Shortstop / Outfielder
- Born: October 22, 1982 (age 43); Sandusky, Ohio, U.S.
- Batted: Right Threw: Right

MLB debut
- April 6, 2008, for the Pittsburgh Pirates

Last MLB appearance
- July 28, 2012, for the Houston Astros

MLB statistics
- Batting average: .189
- Home runs: 2
- Runs batted in: 14
- Stats at Baseball Reference

Teams
- Pittsburgh Pirates (2008–2009); Washington Nationals (2011); Houston Astros (2012)
Medals
Men's baseball
Representing the United States
Baseball World Cup
Gold medal – first place	2007 Tianmu	Team

Brian Joseph Bixler (born October 22, 1982) is a former American professional baseball shortstop and outfielder. He has played in Major League Baseball (MLB) for the Pittsburgh Pirates, Washington Nationals and Houston Astros as well as for the United States national baseball team.

== College career ==
Bixler attended college at Eastern Michigan University. Bixler also played in the Great Lakes Summer Collegiate League for the Delaware Cows, as well as for the Brewster Whitecaps of the Cape Cod Baseball League in 2003.

== Professional career ==
=== Pittsburgh Pirates ===
Bixler was Pittsburgh's second-round pick in the 2004 Major League Baseball draft. He spent 2004 in the short-season New York–Penn League playing for the Williamsport Crosscutters. He spent his first full professional season with the Class-A Hickory Crawdads. In 2006, Bixler played for both the High-A Lynchburg Hillcats and the Double-A Altoona Curve. He was invited to spring training by the Pirates in 2007, batting .359 with a .970 OPS. In 2007, Bixler played for the Triple-A Indianapolis Indians, and was named the team's most valuable player. On November 20, 2007, the Pirates purchased his contract, protecting Bixler from the Rule 5 draft. Bixler did not make the Pirates' opening day roster in 2008, but received a call-up on April 6 when Jack Wilson was placed on the disabled list. That same day, Bixler made his major league debut against the Florida Marlins as a pinch hitter and struck out in his only at bat. He spent the majority of the season in Indianapolis, but made several short appearances for the Pirates. On September 2, he was recalled again when the rosters expanded. He got into 50 games for the Pirates in 2008, with a .423 OPS. In 2009, Bixler attended spring training, but was reassigned to the AAA Indianapolis Indians on March 30. He was recalled to Pittsburgh in late April after Jack Wilson was placed on the disabled list. In 8 games with Pittsburgh, he batted .200. He was optioned back to AAA when Wilson returned from injury. After the June call-ups of AAA outfielders Steven Pearce, Garrett Jones and Jeff Salazar to Pittsburgh, Bixler began to see playing time in center field due to the shortage of players on the roster. Bixler was again recalled to Pittsburgh in mid-August. He got into 18 games for the Pirates in 2009, with a .602 OPS. On January 18, 2010, Bixler was traded to the Cleveland Indians for Jesus Brito.

=== Cleveland Indians ===
On January 18, 2010, the Indians acquired Bixler from the Pittsburgh Pirates for Jesus Brito. He was designated for assignment by the Indians on March 17, 2010, to make room on the 40-man roster for Anderson Hernández, and was subsequently sent outright to the minors. While in the Indians' organization, he played 64 games for the AAA Columbus Clippers. On July 11, 2010, he was traded back to Pittsburgh.

=== Return to the Pirates ===
On July 11, 2010, the Pirates re-acquired Bixler. He played in 11 games for the AAA Indianapolis. On August 7, 2010, the Pirates sold Bixler to the Washington Nationals.

=== Washington Nationals ===
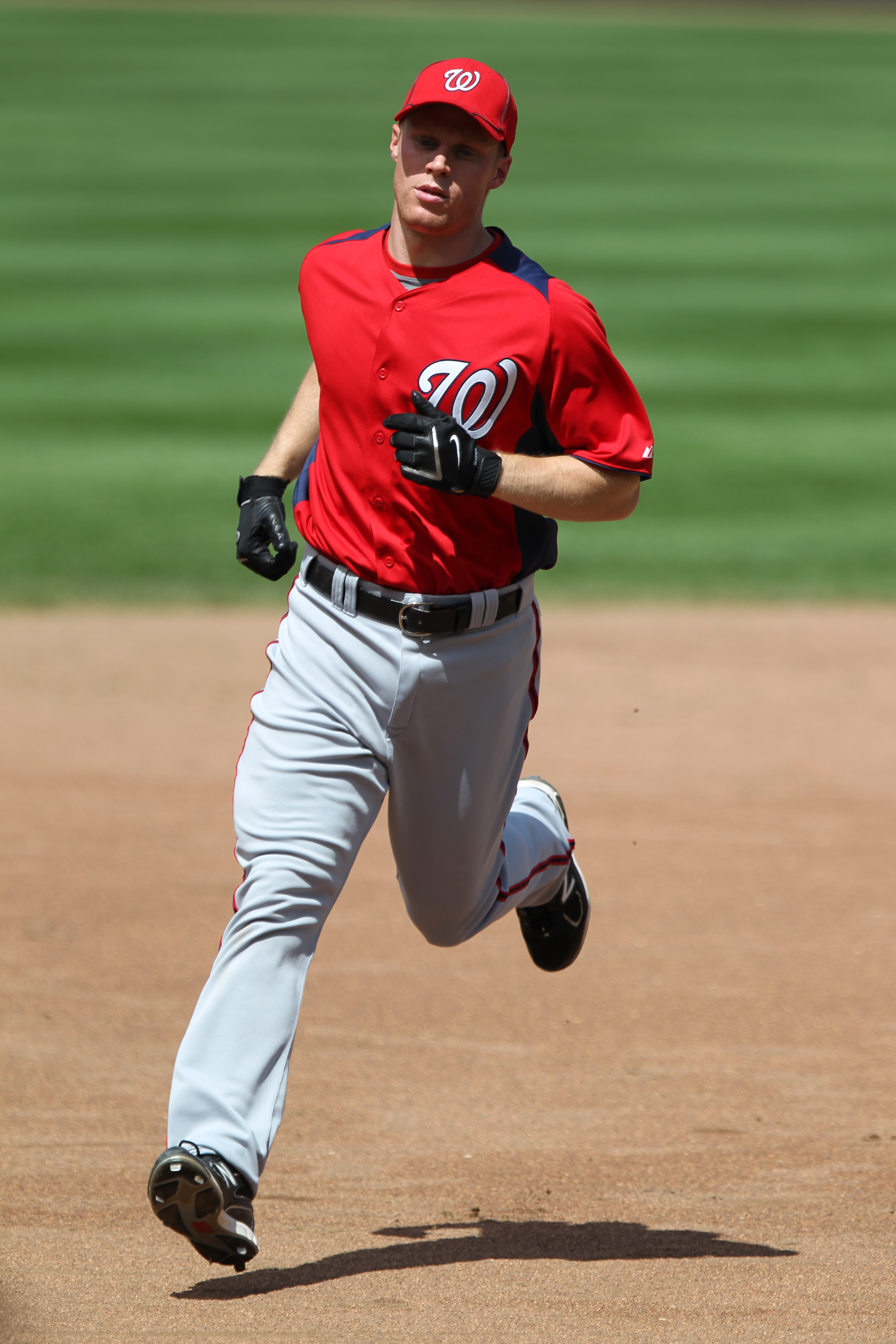
Bixler during his tenure with the Washington Nationals in 2011

On August 7, 2010, the Pirates sold Bixler to the Washington Nationals. He played in 27 games for the AAA Syracuse Chiefs. Bixler re-signed with the Nationals following the 2010 season and had his contract purchased on April 22, 2011. He got into 79 games with the Nationals in 2011, with a .532 OPS.

=== Houston Astros ===
The Houston Astros claimed Bixler off waivers from the Nationals on November 3, 2011. In October 2012, Bixler elected minor league free agency.

=== New York Mets ===
On November 16, 2012, the New York Mets announced that Bixler had been signed to a minor league contract with an invitation to Spring training.

=== Philadelphia Phillies ===
Bixler signed a minor league deal with the Philadelphia Phillies on February 4, 2014.

=== San Diego Padres ===
Bixler signed a minor league deal with the Padres on April 25, 2014. He became a free agent after the 2014 season.

== International career ==
Brian Bixler was named as one of the 24 players that would be part of Team USA in the IBAF 2007 Baseball World Cup. He had a .160 BA with a double and 5 walks in 9 games. The USA won gold in Taiwan.
