= Hayden Park =

Baseball park in Oxford, Ohio, U.S.

Stanley G. McKie Field at Joseph P. Hayden Jr. Park
- McKie Field at Hayden Park
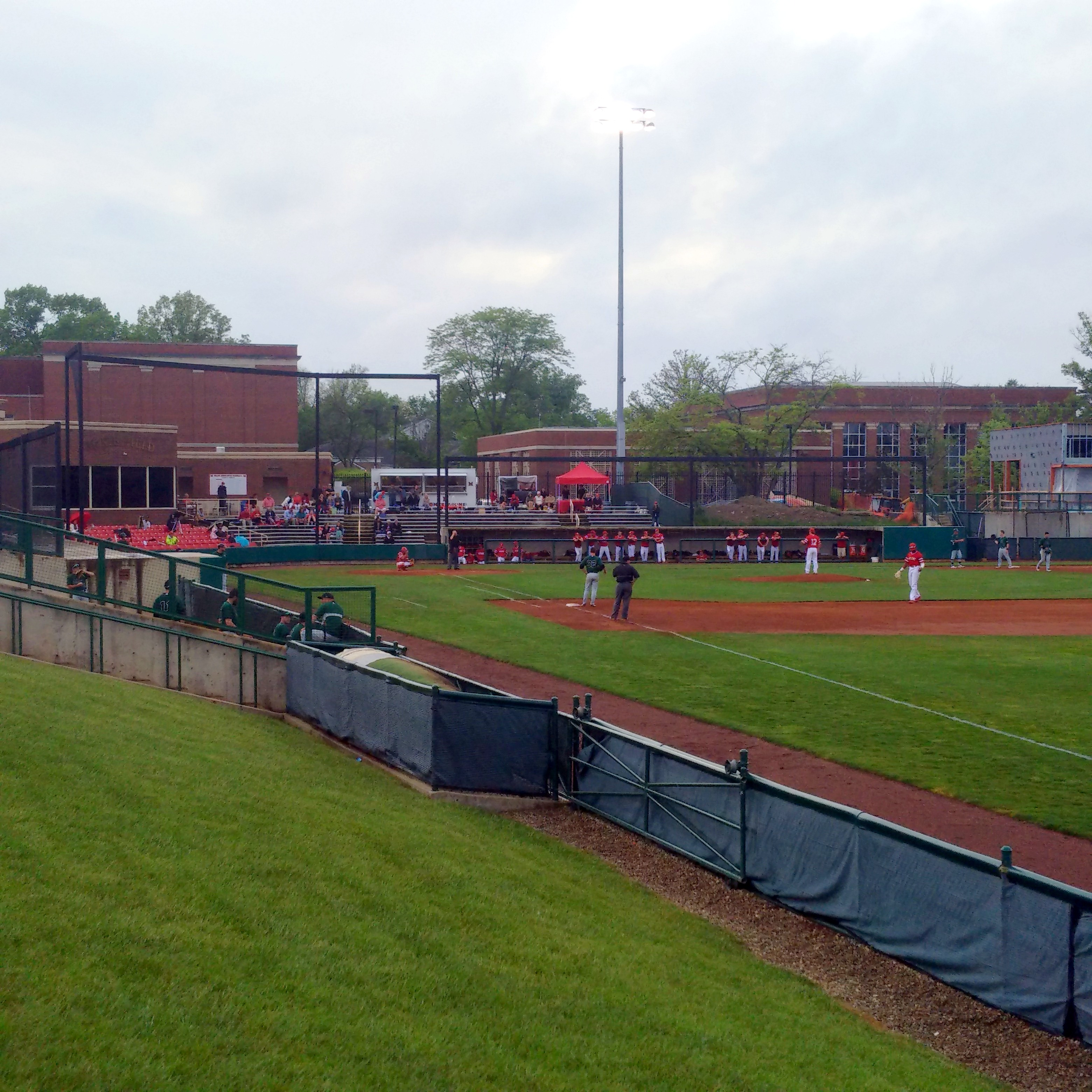
- Interactive map of Stanley G. McKie Field at Joseph P. Hayden Jr. Park
- Location: Withrow Lane, Oxford, OH, United States
- Coordinates: 39.512921°N 84.732807°W
- Owner: Miami University
- Operator: Miami University
- Capacity: 1,000
- Executive suites: 1
- Surface: Astroturf
- Scoreboard: Electronic

Construction
- Opened: March 24, 2002
- Renovated: 2004

Tenant
- Miami RedHawks baseball (NCAA) (2002–present)

Stanley G. McKie Field at Joseph P. Hayden Jr. Park, commonly referred to as Hayden Park or McKie Field at Hayden Park, is a baseball venue in Oxford, Ohio, United States. It is home to the Miami RedHawks baseball team, who play at the Division I level of the National Collegiate Athletic Association (NCAA) as members of the Mid-American Conference (MAC). The field, with a capacity of 1,000 spectators, opened on March 24, 2002, for a game against Purdue. The RedHawks lost 8–0 in the game, which was played in front of 1,178 spectators.

In 2012, college baseball writer Eric Sorenson ranked the park the best small venue in Division I baseball.

== Features ==
The facility includes dugouts, indoor batting cages, bullpens, a press box, a picnic area, and a luxury suite and room. The press box is officially known as the Dave Young Press Box and the luxury room as the Smokey Alston Luxury Room. The electronic scoreboard in left center field features a radar gun (added in 2004) and a message board.

== See also ==
- List of NCAA Division I baseball venues
