= 2017 Mid-American Conference baseball tournament =

American collegiate baseball tournament

- Teams: 8
- Format: Double-elimination
- Finals site: Sprenger Stadium; Avon, Ohio
- Champions: Ohio (3rd title)

2017 Mid-American Conference baseball standings
	Conf.				Overall
Team	W		L	PCT	W		L	PCT
East Division
Kent State ^{x}‍†‍‍	18	–	6	.750	37	–	18	.673
Ohio ‍‍‡‍^{y}	13	–	11	.542	31	–	28	.525
Bowling Green ‍‍‍	9	–	15	.375	15	–	34	.306
Miami (OH) ‍‍‍	8	–	16	.333	22	–	34	.393
Buffalo ‍‍‍	8	–	16	.333	17	–	34	.333
West Division
Central Michigan ^{x}‍‍‍	16	–	8	.667	31	–	28	.525
Ball State ‍‍‍	14	–	10	.583	30	–	28	.517
Eastern Michigan ‍‍‍	14	–	10	.583	27	–	35	.435
Western Michigan ‍‍‍	12	–	12	.500	24	–	29	.453
Northern Illinois ‍‍‍	11	–	13	.458	17	–	38	.309
Toledo ‍‍‍	9	–	15	.375	17	–	41	.293
x – Division champion † – Conference champion ‡ – Tournament champion y – Invited to the NCAA tournament Rankings from Collegiate Baseball

The 2017 Mid-American Conference baseball tournament was held from May 24 to 28. The top eight regular season finishers of the league's eleven teams, regardless of division, meet in the double-elimination tournament to be held at Sprenger Stadium in Avon, Ohio. Ohio won the tournament and earned the conference's automatic bid to the 2017 NCAA Division I baseball tournament.

== Seeding and format ==
The winners of each division claimed the top two seeds, with the remaining six spots in the field determined by conference winning percentage, regardless of division. Teams then played a two bracket, double-elimination tournament leading to a single elimination final.

Division	Team	W	L	Pct	GB	Seed
East	Kent State	18	6	.750	—	1
East	Ohio	13	11	.542	5	5
East	Bowling Green	9	15	.375	9	—
East	Buffalo	8	16	.333	10	—
East	Miami (OH)	8	16	.333	10	—
West	Central Michigan	16	8	.500	—	2
West	Eastern Michigan	14	10	.583	2	3
West	Ball State	14	10	.583	2	4
West	Western Michigan	12	12	.458	4	6
West	Northern Illinois	11	13	.583	5	7
West	Toledo	9	15	.375	7	8

== Results ==
First round
1	Kent State	7
8	Toledo	0
4	Ball State	3
5	Ohio	4
4	Ball State	5
8	Toledo	15
2	Central Michigan	6
7	Northern Illinois	2
3	Eastern Michigan	5
6	Western Michigan	6^{10}
3	Eastern Michigan	8
7	Northern Illinois	7

Second round
1	Kent State	3
5	Ohio	5
8	Toledo	3
1	Kent State	6
2	Central Michigan	16
6	Western Michigan	5
3	Eastern Michigan	12
6	Western Michigan	6

Semifinals
5	Ohio	7	-
1	Kent State	2	-
2	Central Michigan	1	2
3	Eastern Michigan	9	4^{10}

Final
5	Ohio	7
3	Eastern Michigan	4
