= V.A. Memorial Stadium =

Baseball stadium in Chillicothe, Ohio

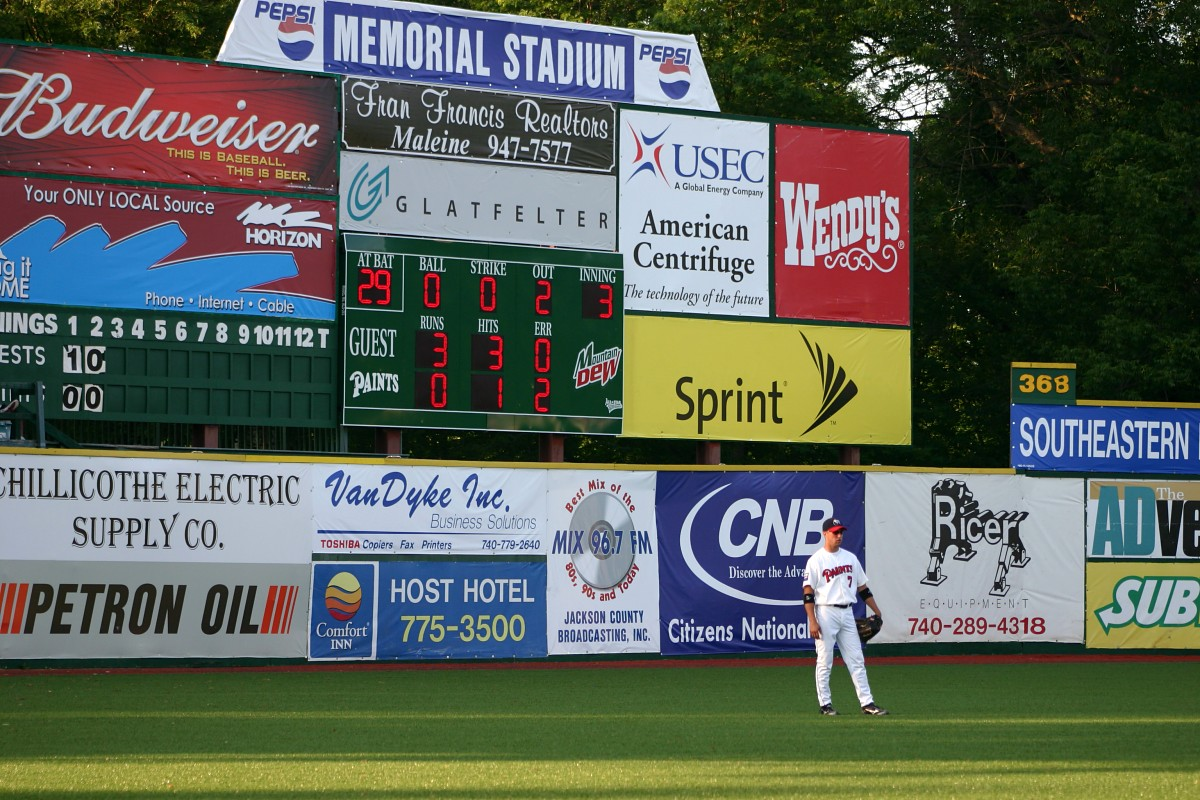
- Interactive map of V.A. Memorial Stadium
- Location: Chillicothe, Ohio
- Coordinates: 39.38924°N 83.01765°W
- Capacity: 3000+
- Surface: Field Turf
- Field size: Left Field: 327 ft (100m); Left Center: 368 ft (112m); Center Field: 395 ft (120m); Right Center: 345 ft (105m); Right Field: 325 ft (99m)

Construction
- Built: 1954
- Opened: 1955
- Renovated: 1993, 2006, 2011, 2025

Tenant
- Chillicothe Paints (FL/PL) 1993–present

V.A. Memorial Stadium is a baseball stadium located on the grounds of the Veterans Administration Hospital campus off of OH-104, three miles north of Chillicothe, Ohio. It is officially designated as building 244. The stadium is the home field of the Chillicothe Paints, a collegiate wooden bat baseball team in the Prospect League. Though primarily used for baseball, V.A. Memorial Stadium has been used for softball, soccer, and other non-sporting events.

The stadium holds over 3000 people. The main grandstand is covered and constructed of concrete and brick. The seating in the grandstand consists of 12 rows of bench seats with the lower 6 rows having backrests. Additional seating includes metal bleachers along the first and third base lines and a party deck extending from just beyond third base to the left field corner. Until 2006 the playing surface consisted of natural grass and dirt. In 2006, Field Turf was installed.

== Stadium history ==
The stadium was constructed in 1954 with funding from the Blue Star Mothers of America. It was originally used as a field for the patients of the VA Hospital to play softball.

In 1993, the Frontier League began operations with the Chillicothe Paints playing in VA Memorial Stadium as one of the original 8 teams. The Paints organization with cooperation from the Department of Veterans Affairs renovated the stadium for the Paints opening game in June 1993.

In 2006 the Ross County Commissioners and Ross County Convention Facility Authority worked together to further renovate the stadium adding the left field party deck and Field Turf.

== Stadium events ==
- Chillicothe Paints, a collegiate summer baseball team that plays in the Prospect League
- Mid-American Conference baseball tournament from 2008 to 2011
- Great Lakes Intercollegiate Athletic Conference (GLIAC) Baseball Tournament, 2009–2011
- Ohio High School Athletic Association (OHSAA) Division III District and Regional Baseball Tournament
- River States Conference Baseball Championship
- North Coast Athletic Conference Baseball Championship Tournament
- OHSAA regular season baseball and soccer games
- Scenes from the 1999 movie A Little Inside were filmed in the stadium

Events and tenants
| Preceded by first venue Don McBride Stadium | Host of the FL All-Star Game; V.A. Memorial Stadium; 1993; 1997 | Succeeded by Don Edwards Park; Don McBride Stadium |
