= Schoonover Stadium =

College baseball stadium in Kent, Ohio, U.S.

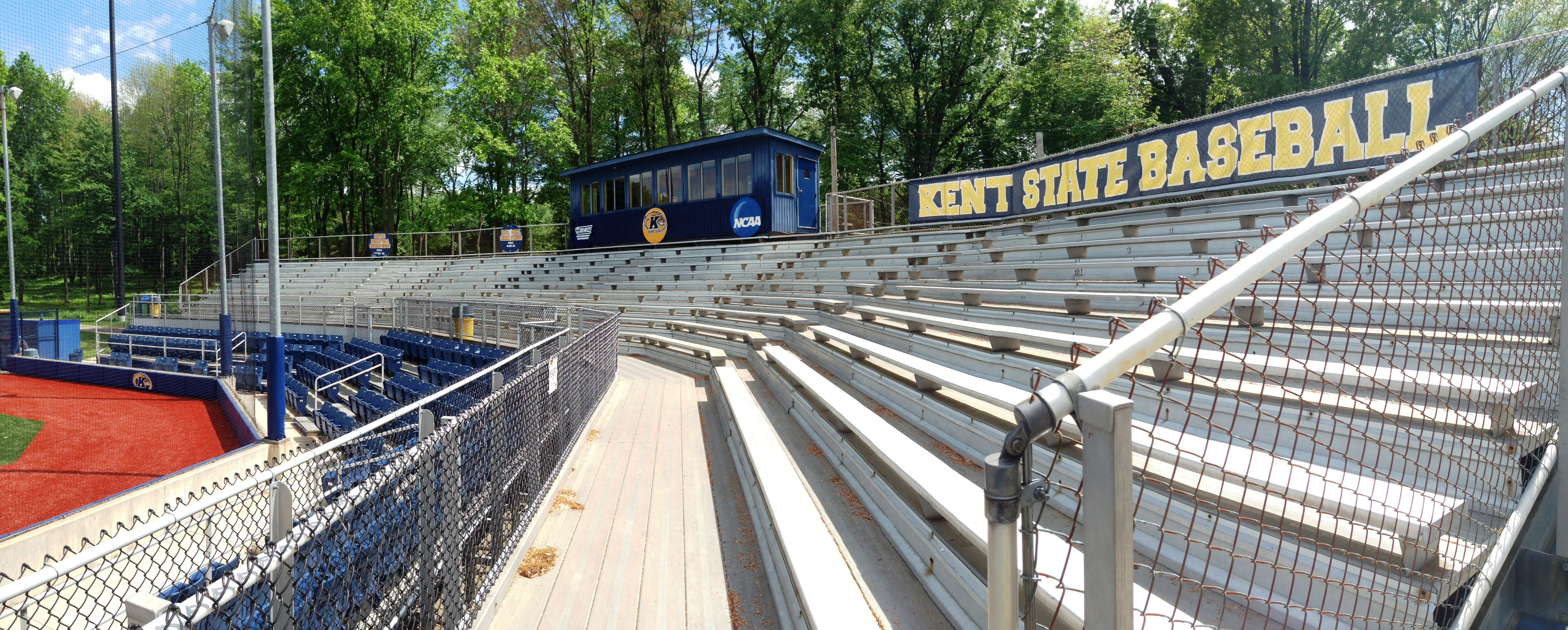

- Location in Ohio Location in United States
- Full name: Olga Mural Field at Schoonover Stadium
- Former names: Gene Michael Field (1990–2003)
- Location: 1544 Campus Center Drive; Kent, Ohio, 44242; United States
- Coordinates: 41°08′08″N 81°20′34″W
- Owner: Kent State University
- Operator: Kent State University
- Capacity: 500
- Surface: Shaw Sports Turf
- Scoreboard: Electronic

Construction
- Opened: 1966
- Renovated: 2005
- Cost: $3,000,000

Tenants
- Kent State Golden Flashes (NCAA); 1966–present

Olga Mural Field at Schoonover Stadium is a baseball venue located on the campus of Kent State University in Kent, Ohio, United States. It is home to the Kent State Golden Flashes baseball team, a member of the Mid-American Conference that competes in the National Collegiate Athletic Association (NCAA) at the Division I level. The field opened in 1966 and was previously known as Gene Michael Field from 1990 to 2003. The facility was renamed in late 2003 and renovated in 2005 with additional upgrades made from 2006 through 2008 and again in 2013 to 2014. It has a seating capacity of 500 people with a Shaw Sports Turf synthetic playing surface.

== History ==
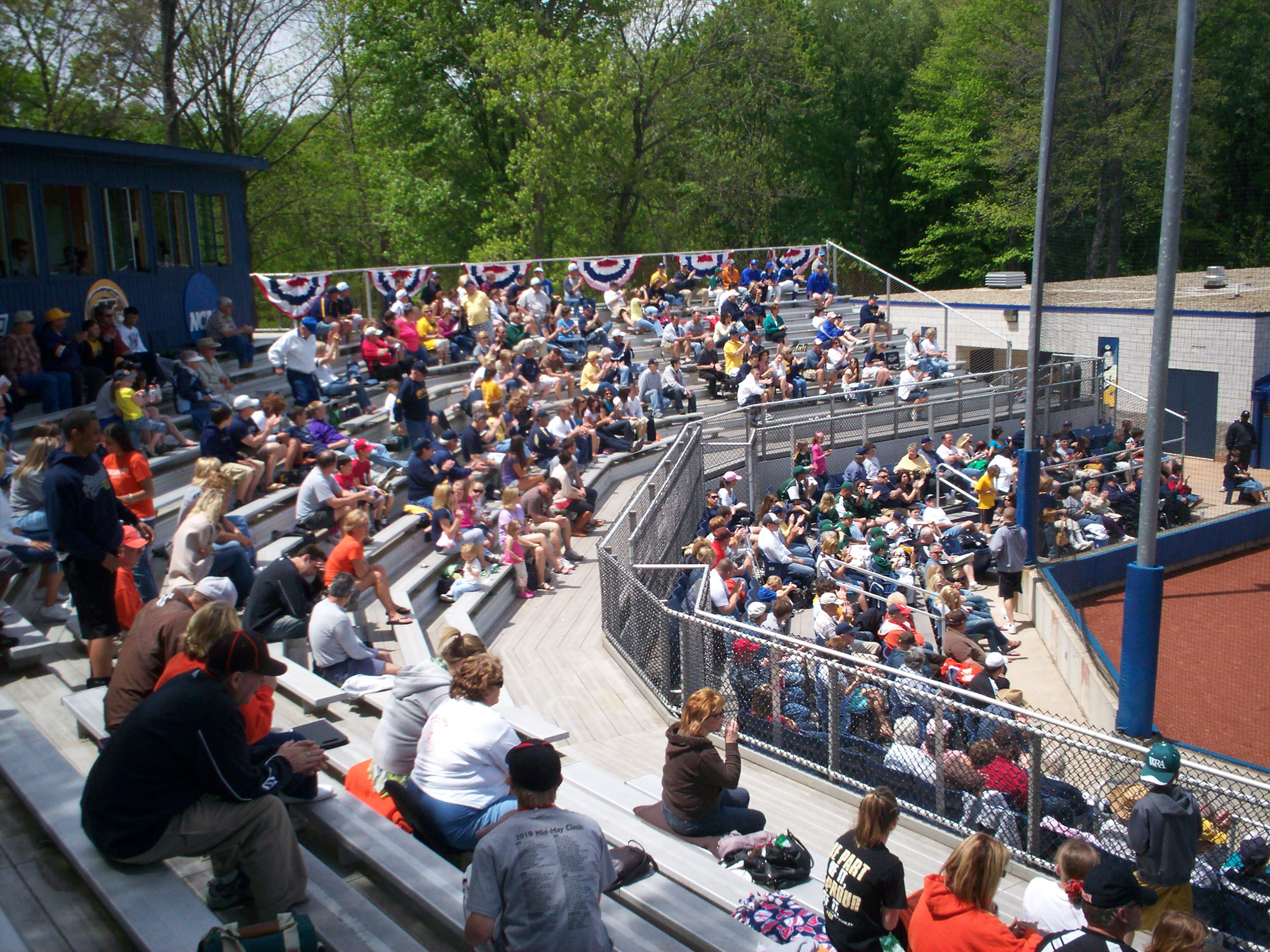
Main seating area in 2010

The Golden Flashes have played at the current site of Schoonover Stadium since 1966. It is the fourth location to serve as the team's home field since the team was founded in 1914. After playing their first few seasons at a makeshift field at the bottom of the hill on the original campus, the team played at Rockwell Field from 1920 to 1941, then the southeastern edge of campus. Rockwell Field was also shared with the football and track teams. In 1942, the team moved to a new field along Summit Street that was part of a Works Progress Administration project that also included an adjacent football field surrounded by a cinder track, later known as Memorial Stadium. This baseball field, often referred to just as the "varsity baseball field" served as home to the Flashes until 1960, when the site was needed for construction of a new academic building, later named Bowman Hall. A new field, located on the opposite end of Memorial Stadium from the previous field, opened in 1961, and was often referred to as Memorial Field or "Memorial baseball field". While at Memorial Field, in 1964, the team qualified for its first NCAA tournament and hosted the eventual national champion Minnesota Golden Gophers in the district round of the 1964 NCAA University Division baseball tournament. Memorial Field served as the Flashes' home field through the 1965 season when that site was needed for construction of the university's new 12-story library and a science classroom building later named Williams Hall.

The first game at the current baseball field, which had no official name, was May 3, 1966 against the Ohio State Buckeyes. Initial plans called for the new field to be adjacent to a new football stadium, but the stadium would later be built at a different site further east as Dix Stadium. By 1969, the new varsity baseball field was referred to as Allerton Field as Allerton Street was nearest street at the time of the field's construction. It was a natural grass field with wooden bleacher seating for approximately 700 people. After the conclusion of the 1989 season, a grandstand was added behind home plate, replacing the original wooden bleachers and increasing the seating capacity to approximately 1,000. The project also included a press box, new concession stand, a warning track on the field, a new outfield fence, and updates to the infield, completed prior to the 1990 season. In September 1989, the university named the field in honor of Kent State alumnus Gene Michael, who played and managed professionally in Major League Baseball. It was formally dedicated April 23, 1990.

The Schoonover Foundation donated US$1.53 million to the university in November 2003 and the stadium was renamed for 1949 KSU alumnus Harold "Hal" Schoonover and his wife Julie. The initial donation helped fund a $3 million project that included new dugouts and bullpens, upgrades in seating, a drainage system and artificial FieldTurf playing surface, restroom facilities, and outfield fencing. The renovations were completed in 2005. The first game at the renovated and updated stadium was on April 1, 2005, with Kent State losing to Ohio 6–2 in front of 476 fans.

Area philanthropist Olga Mural donated $1 million towards further renovations to the ballpark in 2006 and the playing field at Schoonover Stadium was named after her in recognition of the contribution. With Mural's donation, a new locker room and players' lounge was built and chairback seating was added to the grandstand in 2007. Additional upgrades including a new scoreboard were installed in 2008.

In September 2025 a bronze statue in honor of Kent State alumnus Thurman Munson was installed outside the entrance of the stadium. Munson's widow, Diana Munson was present at the unveiling ceremony. Munson played for the Flashes in 1967 and 1968 and, as of 2026, holds the KSU record for career batting average at .390. He batted .413 in 1968 and was named a First Team All-American before being drafted by the New York Yankees where he went on to be a seven-time All Star, three-time Gold Glove winner, 1970 American League Rookie of the Year, and 1976 American League MVP.

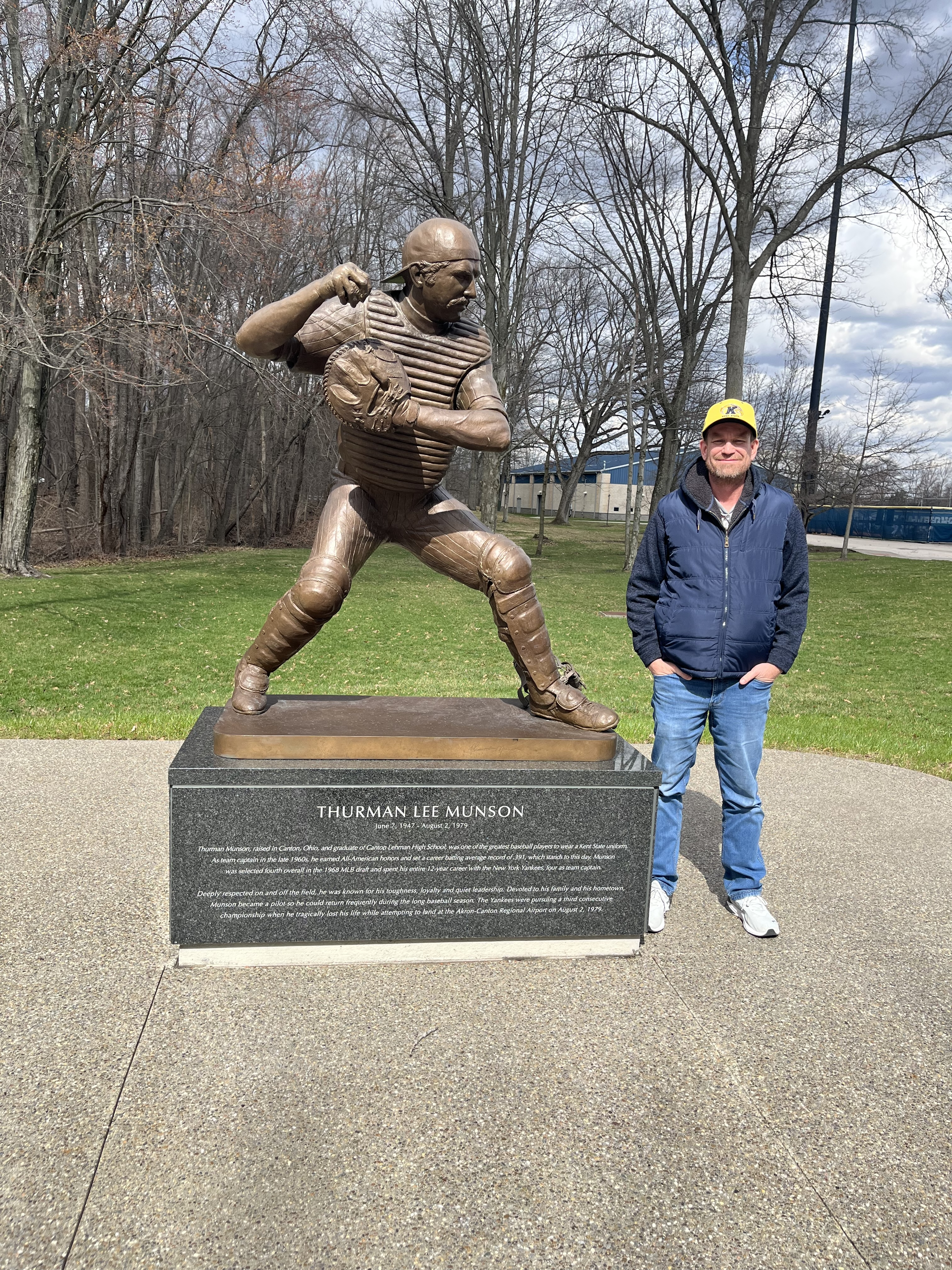
Bronze statue of Thurman Munson outside of Schoonover Stadium

== Facilities ==
The field is located on the southern edge of the Kent State campus, at the corner of Campus Center Drive and Ohio State Route 261. Adjacent to the field is the Allerton Softball Complex, a set of four intramural softball fields. Immediately north of the field is the indoor practice facility for both the baseball and softball teams, the David and Peggy Edmonds Baseball and Softball Training Facility, which opened in 2014. The Edmunds Hitting Facility includes dirt pitching mounds, movable batting cages, as well as offices for the coaching staff. It is named for Dave Edmonds, a 1980 KSU baseball alumnus, and his wife Peggy, who made the lead gift for the facility.

In 2005, the playing surface was changed to FieldTurf, after having previously been natural grass. The FieldTurf was replaced in 2015 by Shaw Sports Turf. After the team's appearance in the 2012 College World Series, permanent lighting was added to the stadium in time for the 2013 season opener.

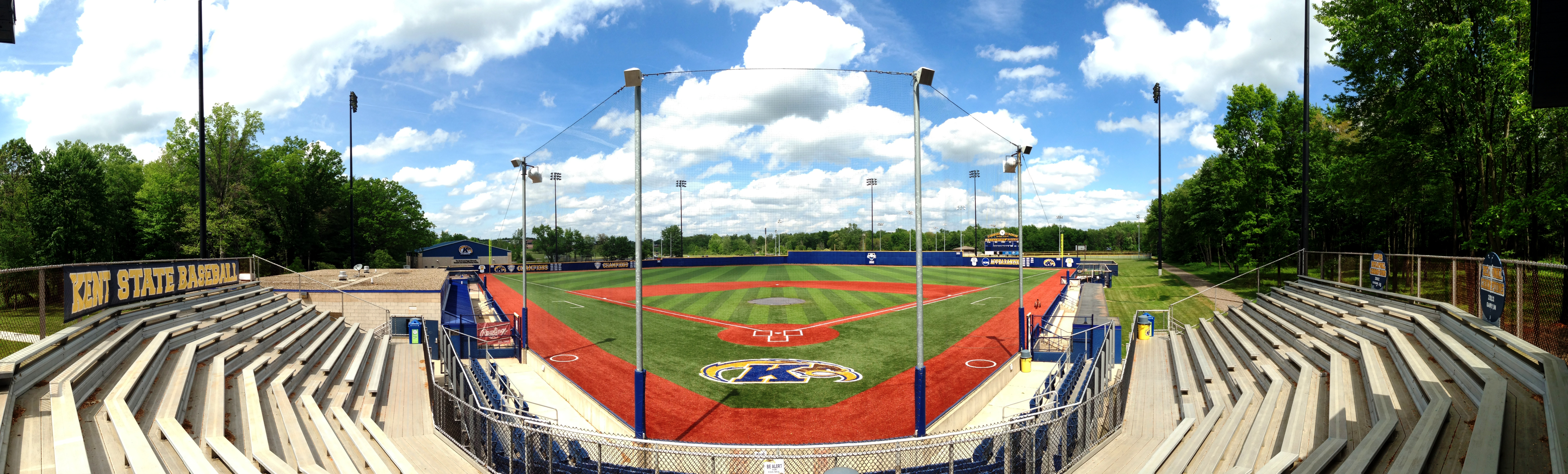
Panorama in 2015

== See also ==
- List of NCAA Division I baseball venues
