= Akron Zips baseball =

Baseball team of the University of Akron

Akron Zips
- 2026 Akron Zips baseball team
- Founded: 1873
- University: University of Akron
- Head coach: Brian Valentine (interim)
- Conference: Mid-American Conference
- Location: Akron, Ohio
- Home stadium: Skeeles Field (capacity: 1,500)
- Nickname: Zips
- Colors: Blue and gold

NCAA tournament appearances
- 1996

Conference tournament champions
- 1991 (MCC), 1996 (MAC)

Conference regular season champions
- 1954 (OAC)

The Akron Zips baseball team is the varsity intercollegiate athletic team representing the University of Akron in Akron, Ohio, United States. The team plays in the National Collegiate Athletic Association (NCAA) at the Division I level as a member of the Mid-American Conference (MAC). The program plays at Skeeles Field and are currently led by interim head coach Brian Valentine.

== History ==
The program was established in early 1873 during the school's first academic year and played in the Ohio Athletic Conference (OAC) from 1954 to 1966, the Ohio Valley Conference from 1981 through 1987, and the Mid-Continent Conference for the 1990, 1991, and 1992 seasons. The Zips began competition in the MAC in 1993 and were placed in the East Division when it was created in 2000. The team had one appearance in the NCAA Division I Baseball Championship, which came in 1996 following their only MAC Tournament championship. Additionally, the Zips won the 1954 OAC championship and the 1991 Mid-Continent Conference title.

On July 10, 2015, Akron announced the baseball program would be eliminated, effective immediately, after having fielded the sport since 1873 and uninterrupted since 1947. The university cited budget problems as the main reason for ending the program. A group of baseball alumni formed in an effort to try to save the program. Players were permitted to remain on scholarship to finish their degree, though most transferred to other schools to continue their playing careers.

On September 19, 2017, the university announced baseball would return for the 2019–20 academic year.

It was announced in Fall of 2018 that the baseball team, resuming play in 2020, would be led by Head coach Chris Sabo, former Major League All-Star and Rookie of the year. His assistants would be Associate head coach Jordon Banfield and Pitching Coach Dan McKinney. The program returned with a 1-12 record in 2020 before the March 12 pandemic-related suspension of NCAA sports.

As of 2024, Akron and Northern Illinois are the only current or former MAC schools not to have a player named the MAC Baseball Player of the Year or MAC Baseball Pitcher of the Year since those awards were first given in 1986 and 1988 respectively.

== NCAA Tournament ==
Akron has participated in the NCAA Division I baseball tournament once.

Year	Region	Round	Opponent	Result
1996	Central II Regional	First Round; Lower Round 1	USC; Texas Tech	L 10–20; L 2–7

== Major League Baseball ==
Akron has had 22 Major League Baseball draft selections since the draft began in 1965.

Zips in the Major League Baseball Draft
Year	Player	Round	Team
1965	Ray Glinsky	47	Cardinals
1966	Ray Glinsky	2	Tigers
1966	James Barton	2	White Sox
1971	Randy Richards	2	Pirates
1981	Randy Budd	22	Expos
1982	Mike Birkbeck	11	Cubs
1983	Mike Birkbeck	4	Brewers
1985	Pat Gliha	22	Braves
1987	John Massarelli	8	Astros
1995	Jim Putko	23	Cubs
2000	Mark Malaska	8	Devil Rays
2003	Aaron Gangi	14	Devil Rays
2006	Ross Liersemann	18	Marlins
2007	Tom Farmer	20	Twins
2008	Doug McNulty	49	Mets
2008	Tom Farmer	47	Twins
2011	Drew Turocy	24	Red Sox
2011	Chris Bassitt	16	White Sox
2012	Andrew Brown	23	Rockies
2014	Devan Ahart	16	Dodgers
2015	Joey Havrilak	18	Tigers
2015	J. T. Brubaker	6	Pirates
