= Western Michigan Broncos baseball =

Western Michigan Broncos
- 2026 Western Michigan Broncos baseball team
- Founded: 1911
- University: Western Michigan University
- Head coach: Billy Gernon (16th season)
- Conference: Mid–American
- Location: Kalamazoo, Michigan
- Home stadium: Hyames Field
- Nickname: Broncos
- Colors: Brown and gold

College World Series runner-up
- 1955

College World Series appearances
- 1952, 1955, 1958, 1959, 1961, 1963

NCAA tournament appearances
- 1952, 1955, 1957, 1958, 1959, 1961, 1962, 1963, 1966, 1967, 1989, 2016, 2024

Conference tournament champions
- 2016, 2024

Conference regular season champions
- 1949, 1950, 1951, 1952, 1955, 1957, 1958, 1959, 1961, 1962, 1963, 1966, 1967, 1989

The Western Michigan Broncos baseball team is a varsity intercollegiate athletic team of Western Michigan University in Kalamazoo, Michigan, United States. The team competes in the National Collegiate Athletic Association (NCAA) at the Division I as a member of the Mid-American Conference West division. The team plays its home games at Hyames Field in Kalamazoo. The Broncos are coached by Billy Gernon, who began his tenure in 2011.

Western Michigan's first baseball team was fielded in 1911. Through the 2016 season, the Broncos have won 14 MAC titles, the most recent being in 1989, and have made 11 appearances in the NCAA Division I Baseball Championship, with the most recent being in 2016 following their first Mid-American Conference baseball tournament championship. Western Michigan has also made six appearances in the College World Series, the most recent being in 1963. The 1955 team finished as national runner-up, falling to Wake Forest 7–6 in the championship game. The Broncos had a 6–3 lead in the fifth inning of that game before the Demon Deacons tied it in the sixth inning and took the lead in the eighth. The runner-up finish remains tied for the highest national finish for a MAC team, along with Eastern Michigan in 1976.

== Western Michigan in the NCAA tournament ==
Year	Record	Pct	Notes
1952	2–2	.500	College World Series 3rd Place
1955	7–4	.636	College World Series 2nd Place, hosted District 4
1957	1–2	.333	Hosted District 4
1958	5–2	.714	College World Series 3rd Place, District 4 Champions
1959	5-3	.625	College World Series 5th Place, District 4 Champions
1961	4–2	.667	College World Series 5th Place, District 4 Champions
1962	2–2	.500	District 4
1963	3-3	.500	College World Series 7th Place, District 4 Champions
1966	2–2	.500	District 4
1967	3–2	.600	District 4
1989	1–2	.333	Midwest Regional
2016	0–2	.000	Louisville Regional
2024	0–2	.000	Lexington Regional
TOTALS	35-30	.538	

== Broncos in Major League Baseball ==
Since the Major League Baseball draft began in 1965, Western Michigan has had 97 players selected.

== See also ==
- List of NCAA Division I baseball programs
