= 2004 Mid-American Conference baseball tournament =

American collegiate baseball tournament

- Teams: 6
- Format: Double-elimination
- Finals site: Bill Theunissen Stadium; Mount Pleasant, MI
- Champions: Kent State (5th title)
- Winning coach: Rick Rembielak (3rd title)
- MVP: Ryan Ford Eastern Michigan; Andy Sonnanstine (Kent State)

2004 Mid-American Conference baseball standings
	Conf.				Overall
Team	W		L	PCT	W		L	PCT
East
Miami ^{x}‍‍‍	14	–	8	.636	36	–	21	.632
Kent State ‍‍‡‍^{y}	14	–	10	.583	36	–	27	.571
Ohio ‍‍‍	12	–	12	.500	25	–	29	.463
Akron ‍‍‍	11	–	12	.478	26	–	27	.491
Marshall ‍‍‍	10	–	13	.435	27	–	27	.500
Buffalo ‍‍‍	4	–	18	.182	15	–	39	.278
West
Central Michigan ^{x}‍‍‍	18	–	6	.750	33	–	24	.579
Eastern Michigan ‍‍‍	14	–	10	.583	32	–	27	.542
Northern Illinois ‍‍‍	14	–	10	.583	31	–	28	.525
Ball State ‍‍‍	14	–	10	.583	28	–	28	.500
Bowling Green ‍‍‍	13	–	11	.542	28	–	19	.596
Toledo ‍‍‍	8	–	16	.333	20	–	34	.370
Western Michigan ‍‍‍	7	–	17	.292	21	–	35	.375
† – Conference champion ‡ – Tournament champion y – Invited to the NCAA tournament As of June 30, 2004; Rankings from Collegiate Baseball

The 2004 Mid-American Conference baseball tournament took place in May 2004. The top six regular season finishers met in the double-elimination tournament held at Bill Theunissen Stadium on the campus of Central Michigan University in Mount Pleasant, Michigan. This was the sixteenth Mid-American Conference postseason tournament to determine a champion. Fourth seed Kent State won their fifth tournament championship to earn the conference's automatic bid to the 2004 NCAA Division I baseball tournament.

== Seeding and format ==
The winner of each division claimed the top two seeds, while the next four finishers based on conference winning percentage only, regardless of division, participated in the tournament. The teams played double-elimination tournament. This was the seventh year of the six team tournament.

Team	W	L	PCT	GB	Seed
East Division
Miami	14	8	.636	–	2
Kent State	14	10	.583	1	6
Ohio	12	12	.500	3	–
Akron	11	12	.478	3.5	–
Marshall	10	13	.435	4.5	–
Buffalo	4	18	.182	10	–
West Division
Central Michigan	18	6	.750	–	1
Eastern Michigan	14	10	.583	4	3
Ball State	14	10	.583	4	4
Northern Illinois	14	10	.583	4	5
Bowling Green	13	11	.542	5	–
Toledo	8	16	.333	10	–
Western Michigan	7	17	.292	11	–

== Results ==
First round
1	Central Michigan	0
6	Kent State	6
3	Eastern Michigan	10
4	Ball State	4
2	Miami	4
5	Northern Illinois	8

Second round
6	Kent State	0
4	Ball State	4
1	Central Michigan	0
2	Miami	6
3	Eastern Michigan	17
5	Northern Illinois	12
5	Northern Illinois	6
6	Kent State	8

Third round
4	Ball State	6
2	Miami	7
3	Eastern Michigan	6
6	Kent State	10

Semifinals
2	Miami	0
3	Eastern Michigan	2

Final
3	Eastern Michigan	4
6	Kent State	7

== All-Tournament Team ==
The following players were named to the All-Tournament Team.

Name	School
Ryan Ford	Eastern Michigan
Andy Sonnanstine	Kent State
Joe Tucker	Kent State
Chad Kinyon	Kent State
Brian Bixler	Eastern Michigan
Derrick Peterson	Eastern Michigan
Eric Sansouci	Northern Illinois
Jason Brown	Miami
Todd Kimling	Eastern Michigan
Chuck Moore	Kent State

=== Most Valuable Player ===
Ryan Ford and Andy Sonnanstine were named co-Most Valuable Players. Ford played for Eastern Michigan while Sonnanstine was a pitcher for Kent State.
