= 2002 Mid-American Conference baseball tournament =

American collegiate baseball tournament

- Teams: 6
- Format: Double-elimination
- Finals site: Warren E. Steller Field; Bowling Green, OH
- Champions: Kent State (4th title)
- Winning coach: Rick Rembielak (2nd title)
- MVP: Brad Snyder (Ball State)

2002 Mid-American Conference baseball standings
	Conf.				Overall
Team	W		L	PCT	W		L	PCT
East
Bowling Green ^{x}‍‍‍	18	–	7	.720	32	–	22	.593
Kent State ‍‍‡‍^{y}	18	–	8	.692	37	–	22	.627
Miami ‍‍‍	16	–	12	.571	31	–	28	.525
Ohio ‍‍‍	14	–	13	.519	26	–	25	.510
Akron ‍‍‍	8	–	19	.296	18	–	33	.353
Buffalo ‍‍‍	6	–	17	.261	16	–	28	.364
Marshall ‍‍‍	7	–	20	.259	17	–	35	.327
West
Eastern Michigan ^{x}‍‍‍	19	–	9	.679	30	–	28	.517
Ball State ‍‍‍	17	–	9	.654	34	–	23	.596
Central Michigan ‍‍‍	14	–	10	.583	31	–	25	.554
Western Michigan ‍‍‍	12	–	13	.480	22	–	25	.468
Northern Illinois ‍‍‍	11	–	14	.440	23	–	32	.418
Toledo ‍‍‍	9	–	18	.333	18	–	34	.346
† – Conference champion ‡ – Tournament champion y – Invited to the NCAA tournament As of June 30, 2002; Rankings from Collegiate Baseball

The 2002 Mid-American Conference baseball tournament took place in May 2002. The top six regular season finishers met in the double-elimination tournament held at Warren E. Steller Field on the campus of Bowling Green State University in Bowling Green, Ohio. This was the fourteenth Mid-American Conference postseason tournament to determine a champion. Third seed Kent State won their second consecutive and fourth overall tournament championship to earn the conference's automatic bid to the 2002 NCAA Division I baseball tournament.

== Seeding and format ==
The winner of each division claimed the top two seeds, while the next four finishers based on conference winning percentage only, regardless of division, participated in the tournament. The teams played double-elimination tournament. This was the fifth year of the six team tournament.

Team	W	L	PCT	GB	Seed
East Division
Bowling Green	18	7	.720	–	1
Kent State	18	8	.692	.5	3
Miami	16	12	.571	3.5	6
Ohio	14	13	.519	5	–
Akron	8	19	.296	11	–
Buffalo	6	17	.261	11	–
Marshall	7	20	.259	12	–
West Division
Eastern Michigan	19	9	.679	–	2
Ball State	17	9	.654	1	4
Central Michigan	14	10	.583	4	5
Western Michigan	12	13	.480	5.5	–
Northern Illinois	11	14	.440	6.5	–
Toledo	9	18	.333	9.5	–

== Results ==
First round
1	Bowling Green	15
6	Miami	6
3	Kent State	13
4	Ball State	4
2	Eastern Michigan	9
5	Central Michigan	15

Second round
1	Bowling Green	11
4	Ball State	20
6	Miami	14
2	Eastern Michigan	13
3	Kent State	18
5	Central Michigan	8
1	Bowling Green	4
5	Central Michigan	11

Third round
4	Ball State	19
6	Miami	16
3	Kent State	2
5	Central Michigan	0

Final
4	Ball State	16	4
3	Kent State	9	13

== All-Tournament Team ==
The following players were named to the All-Tournament Team.

Name	School
Dirk Hayhurst	Kent State
Doug Boone	Ball State
Michael Carlin	Miami
Chris Welsch	Kent State
Brady Glass	Kent State
Tim Bullinger	Central Michigan
Tom Martin	Kent State
Ben Schroeder	Ball State
Brad Snyder	Ball State
Adam Metzler	Ball State

=== Most Valuable Player ===
Brad Snyder won the Tournament Most Valuable Player award. Snyder played for Ball State.
