= Danny Schmitz =

American baseball coach and second baseman

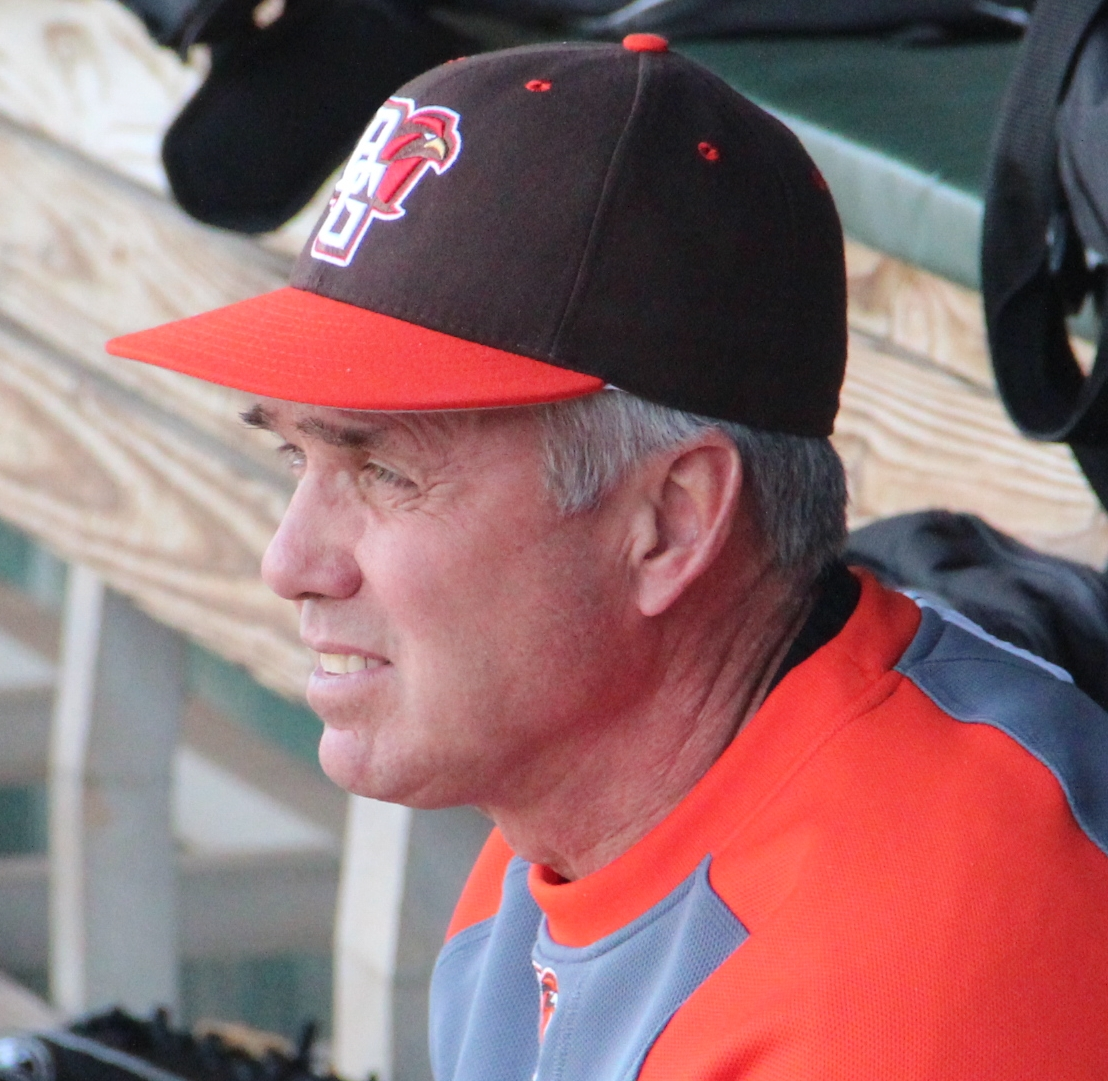
- Schmitz in 2014

Biographical details
- Born: March 1, 1955 (age 71); Detroit, Michigan, U.S.

Playing career
- 1974–1977: Eastern Michigan
- Position: 2B

Coaching career (HC unless noted)
- 1988–1990: Eastern Michigan (Asst.)
- 1991–2020: Bowling Green

Head coaching record
- Overall: 717–786–5

Accomplishments and honors

Championships
- MAC Regular season: 1995, 2002, 2008, 2009; Division: 1998, 1999, 2001, 2002, 2008, 2009, 2010; MAC tournament: 1998, 1999, 2013

Awards
- MAC Coach of the Year: 1994, 1995, 2009

Danny Schmitz is an American baseball coach and former second baseman. He played college baseball at Eastern Michigan for coach Ron Oestrike from 1974 to 1977 before playing professionally from 1977 to 1984. He then served as an assistant coach at Eastern Michigan (1988–1990) before becoming the head baseball coach of the Bowling Green Falcons (1991–2020).

== Playing career ==
Schmitz was a four-year letterman at second base for Eastern Michigan, which he helped to a pair of College World Series appearances including the 1976 final. After his senior season, in which he batted .339 and served as a co-captain, he was drafted in the 20th round of the 1977 Major League Baseball draft by the New York Yankees. Schmitz would go on to play six seasons in the minors, reaching Class AAA in his second season but never reaching the majors. He spent brief time in the New York Mets and Minnesota Twins systems, including a season as a player-coach with the Toledo Mud Hens before retiring and turning full-time to coaching.

== Coaching career ==
Immediately after ending his playing career, he served as manager of the Twins' class-A affiliate Visalia Oaks. He served in that position for three years before returning to Eastern Michigan as an assistant coach. While back with the Hurons, he helped lead EMU to a pair of second-place finishes in 1988 and 1990. He was hired at Bowling Green for his first head coaching job at the collegiate level, just the Falcons ninth coach and fifth since 1928.

While with Bowling Green, the Falcons have claimed four Mid-American Conference regular season titles, seven division titles, and three Mid-American Conference baseball tournament championships. Schmitz has seen 29 players sign professional contracts, while his teams have amassed over 600 wins. Following the COVID-19 pandemic in 2020, Bowling Green State University announced the termination of the baseball program due to budget cuts during the pandemic, just weeks later, the school announced that it had fund-raised enough money to revive the program effective immediately. On June 3, 2020, it was announced that Schmitz would step down from head coach and step into an advisory role with the program.

== Head coaching record ==
This table shows Schmitz's record as a college coach.

Record table
Season	Team	Overall	Conference	Standing	Postseason
Bowling Green Falcons (Mid-American Conference) (1991–2020)
1991	Bowling Green	16–39–1	7–23	9th (9)	
1992	Bowling Green	14–25–1	7–22–1	9th (9)	
1993	Bowling Green	19–27–1	7–23	9th (10)	
1994	Bowling Green	29–18	16–10	3rd (10)	MAC tournament (Note: The top four of the MAC's ten teams qualified for the tournament in 1994.)
1995	Bowling Green	34–20	22–8	1st (10)	MAC tournament (Note: The top four of the MAC's ten teams qualified for the tournament in 1995.)
1996	Bowling Green	28–22	14–17	8th (10)	
1997	Bowling Green	24–27	13–17	8th (10)	
1998	Bowling Green	34–21	17–10	1st (East)	NCAA Regional
1999	Bowling Green	36–24	25–6	1st (East)	NCAA Regional
2000	Bowling Green	29–24–1	14–12	4th (East)	
2001	Bowling Green	36–18	18–9	1st (East)	MAC tournament (Note: The top six of the MAC's thirteen teams qualified for the tournament in 2001.)
2002	Bowling Green	32–22	18–7	1st (East)	MAC tournament (Note: The top six of the MAC's thirteen teams qualified for the tournament in 2002.)
2003	Bowling Green	17–28	9–18	6th (West)	
2004	Bowling Green	28–19	13–11	5th (West)	
2005	Bowling Green	33–18	12–18	3rd (West)	MAC tournament (Note: The top six of the MAC's thirteen teams qualified for the tournament in 2005.)
2006	Bowling Green	26–27	11–16	4th (East)	
2007	Bowling Green	22–32	7–20	6th (East)	
2008	Bowling Green	32–20	16–8	T-1st (East)	MAC tournament (Note: The top eight of the MAC's twelve teams qualified for the tournament in 2008.)
2009	Bowling Green	28–22	18–8	1st (East)	MAC tournament (Note: The top eight of the MAC's twelve teams qualified for the tournament in 2009.)
2010	Bowling Green	31–23	18–9	T-1st (East)	MAC tournament (Note: The top eight of the MAC's twelve teams qualified for the tournament in 2010.)
2011	Bowling Green	20–31	11–14	3rd (East)	MAC tournament (Note: The top eight of the MAC's twelve teams qualified for the tournament in 2011.)
2012	Bowling Green	20–33	9–18	6th (East)	
2013	Bowling Green	24–31	13–14	4th (East)	NCAA Regional
2014	Bowling Green	25–27	15–12	3rd (East)	MAC tournament (Note: The top eight of the MAC's twelve teams qualified for the tournament in 2014.)
2015	Bowling Green	19–24	11–10	3rd (East)	MAC tournament
2016	Bowling Green	17–37	7–17	5th (East)	
2017	Bowling Green	15–34	9–15	3rd (East)	
2018	Bowling Green	11–39	6–19	10th	
2019	Bowling Green	16–33	8–18	8th	
2020	Bowling Green	2–11	0–0		Season canceled due to COVID-19
Bowling Green:		717–786–5	372–398–1		
Total:		717–786–5			
National champion Postseason invitational champion Conference regular season champion Conference regular season and conference tournament champion Division regular season champion Division regular season and conference tournament champion Conference tournament champion

== See also ==
- Career statistics from Baseball Reference (Minors)
