= Kent State Golden Flashes baseball =

College baseball team

- 2026 Kent State Golden Flashes baseball team
- Founded: 1914; 112 years ago
- University: Kent State University
- Head coach: Jeff Duncan (13th season)
- Conference: Mid–American
- Location: Kent, Ohio
- Home stadium: Schoonover Stadium (capacity: 1,148)
- Nickname: Golden Flashes
- Colors: Navy blue and gold

College World Series appearances
- 2012

NCAA regional champions
- 2012

NCAA tournament appearances
- 1964, 1992, 1993, 1994, 2001, 2002, 2004, 2007, 2009, 2010, 2011, 2012, 2014, 2018

Conference tournament champions
- 1992, 1993, 2001, 2002, 2004, 2007, 2009, 2010, 2011, 2012, 2014, 2018

Conference regular season champions
- 1964, 1992, 1993, 1994, 1996, 2000, 2003, 2006, 2008, 2011, 2012, 2013, 2016, 2017, 2018, 2023, 2025

The Kent State Golden Flashes baseball team is a varsity intercollegiate athletic team of Kent State University in Kent, Ohio, United States. The team competes at the Division I level of the National Collegiate Athletic Association (NCAA) as a member of the Mid-American Conference. The head coach is retired Major League Baseball player Jeff Duncan, who was hired in June 2013.

Baseball was established at Kent State in 1914 and the team was known as the "Normal Nine". It is the second-oldest athletic team at Kent State University after the men's basketball team. Kent State began play in the Mid-American Conference in 1951, winning their first conference title in 1964 and making their first appearance in the NCAA tournament. Through the 2025 season, the Flashes have won 17 Mid-American Conference regular-season titles, 12 MAC tournament titles, 12 MAC East division titles, and have made 14 NCAA tournament appearances. The 2012 season marked the team's first appearance in the College World Series.

Home games are held at Schoonover Stadium, the team's home field since 1966. The stadium, previously known as Gene Michael Field, was renovated in 2005 and received additional upgrades in 2007, 2008, and 2013. Additionally, the Flashes have an indoor practice facility, the David and Peggy Edmonds Baseball and Softball Training Facility, which opened in 2014. Kent State has produced a number of players who have gone on to play professionally at the Major League level, including Thurman Munson, Andy Sonnanstine, Emmanuel Burriss, and Dustin Hermanson. It has also produced other professional baseball players, including Banana Ball player KJ Jackson.

== History ==
The team was established in 1914 at the new Kent State Normal School, which was established in 1910 and had its first classes in 1912 at temporary locations. The new campus opened in May 1913. The team is the second intercollegiate athletic team at Kent State, formed just after the men's basketball team, which was established in late 1913. H.E. Nickerson served as manager and William Brown was captain of that first team in 1914. No records of any games are available, though a photo of that team, labeled as the "Ex Temporé Base Ball Team", exists from that season. The following year, the "Normal Nine", coached by school custodian Alexander Whyte, played their first recorded intercollegiate games, opening the season with a 7–6 win over Baldwin Wallace College in Kent. The team finished 1–3 that season and games were held on an informal field in front of the campus, which is now largely occupied by Rockwell Hall. Alf Lovall coached the team to a 1–2 record in 1916 and Paul Chandler led the team to a 3–0 record in 1922. The records for the 1917–21 and 1923–25 seasons are incomplete, though it was during the 1923 season that the various Kent State Normal College teams began being referred to as the Silver Foxes. The team also began play at Rockwell Field around 1920, their home field through the 1941 season.

In 1927, the current "Golden Flashes" name debuted and Merle Wagoner, who also coached the football team from 1925–32, became the Flashes' first long-term coach from 1926–33 leading Kent State to a record of 27–34 in his eight seasons. The Flashes were coached by Gus Peterka for the 1934 and 1935 seasons, Donald Starn for the 1936–1938 seasons, and John Starrett for the 1939–1942 seasons leading up to World War II. During the war years, 1943–1945, Kent State did not field any varsity athletic teams, but resumed in 1946. Wesley Stevens served as head coach for 1946 and 1947 before Matt Resnick took over in 1948. He served as Kent State's coach for the longest tenure to date, from 1948 through the 1961 season compiling an overall record of 132–100–1 and 50–50 in the Mid-American Conference.

=== Mid-American Conference ===
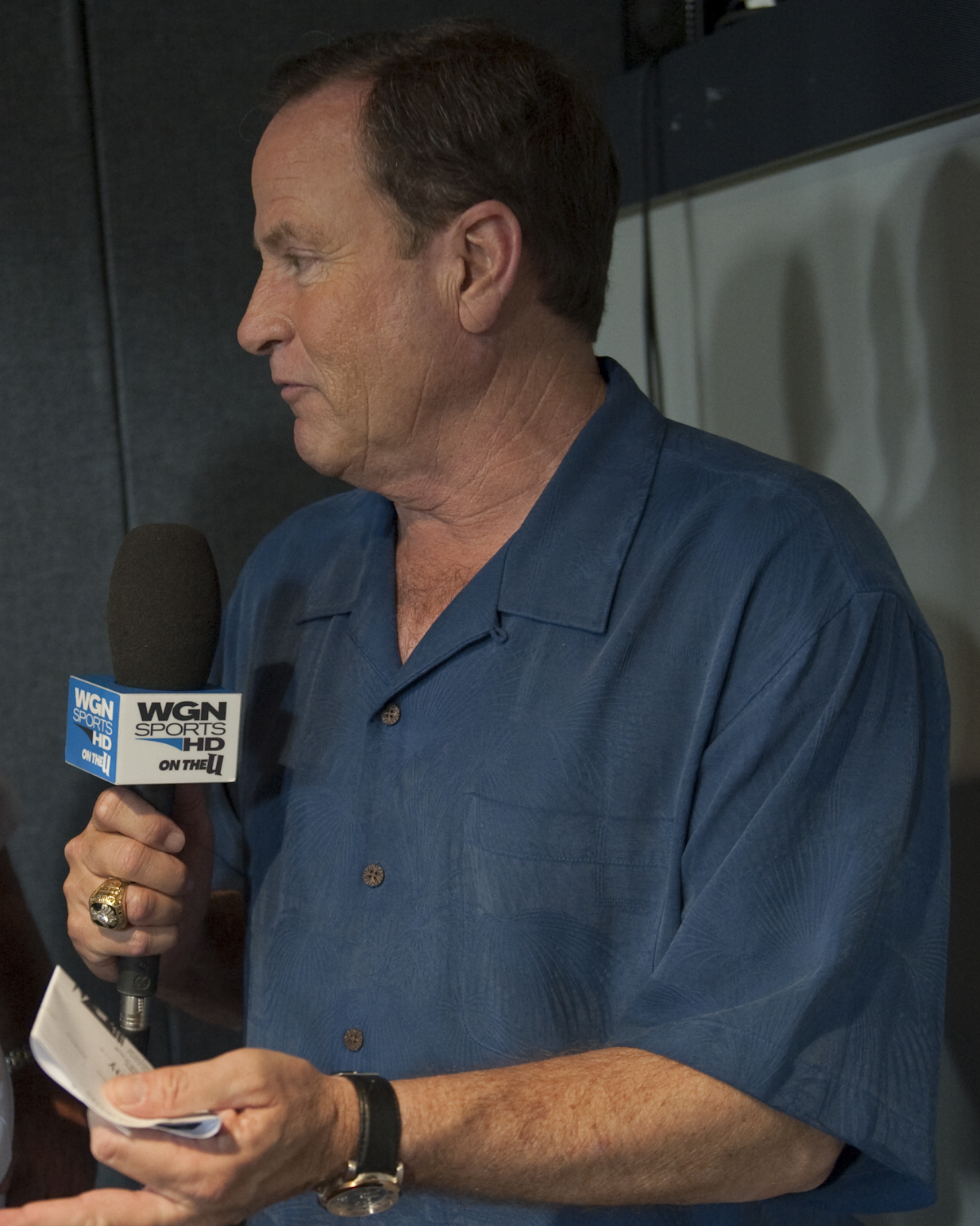
Steve Stone, Cy Young Award winner.

Kent State joined the Mid-American Conference in 1951 and baseball began play in the conference in early 1952, finishing third with a 5–4 record in MAC play. Under Matt Resnick, the Flashes reached third place in 1959 with an 8–3 conference record and second place in Resnick's final season in 1961 with a conference record of 9–2. Dick Paskert took over beginning in 1962 and guided the Flashes to their first MAC regular-season title in 1964 finishing in a tie with the Ohio Bobcats at 10–1. Kent State defeated the Bobcats 6–3 in a playoff game for the Flashes' first NCAA tournament berth, where they were eliminated by the Minnesota Golden Gophers. Paskert would coach through the 1971 season with an overall record of 103–116–4 and 45–59–1 in the MAC. During his tenure he coached notable players such as Thurman Munson, Gene Michael, Rich Rollins, and Steve Stone, as well as future college football and NFL coach Nick Saban, who was also a member of the Golden Flashes football team. Art Welch took over the head coaching position from 1972–1981 and was succeeded by Bob Morgan (1982–1983) and Bob Todd (1984–1987) before Danny Hall was hired for the 1988 season.

==== Danny Hall ====
Danny Hall coached the Flashes from 1988 through the 1993 season. During his tenure, Kent State won its first MAC championship since 1964 by capturing the 1992 and 1993 regular-season and tournament titles and advancing to the NCAA tournament both years. In the 1992 NCAA tournament regional played in Tallahassee, Florida, the Flashes won their first-ever NCAA tournament game defeating the Georgia Bulldogs 5–2. Kent State fell in their next two games versus Western Carolina University and Florida State to finish 1–2. The Flashes returned to the NCAA regionals the following year playing at Baton Rouge, Louisiana. Kent State finished 2–2 that season with wins over eventual national champion Louisiana State and Western Carolina. Hall left after the 1993 season to take the head coaching job at Georgia Tech with an overall record of 208–117 and 106–73 in the MAC at Kent State.

==== Rick Rembielak ====
Rick Rembielak took over the program beginning in the 1994 season, winning the MAC regular-season in his first season and qualifying for the NCAA tournament. During his 11 seasons at Kent State, the Flashes also claimed an overall MAC title in 1996, East Division titles in 2000 and 2003, and MAC tournament titles in 2001, 2002, and 2004. Kent State returned to the NCAA tournament regionals in 2001 at Columbus, Ohio, posting a 2–2 record with wins over host Ohio State and Delaware. The Flashes played in the 2002 and 2004 tournaments, both played at South Bend, Indiana, going 0–2 and 1–2 respectively. Rembielak stepped down after the 2004 season to take the head coaching job at Wake Forest University. He had an overall record at Kent State of 373–251–1 and 200–100 in the MAC.

==== Scott Stricklin ====
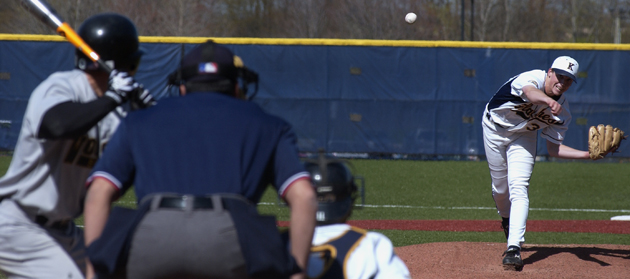
A Golden Flashes player delivers a pitch during a 2006 game

Beginning in the 2005 season, Kent State alumnus Scott Stricklin took over the program after previously serving as pitching coach and recruiting coordinator at Vanderbilt University from 2000–01 and serving as an assistant coach and recruiting coordinator under former KSU coach Danny Hall at Georgia Tech from 2002–04. Under Stricklin, Kent State won six MAC East Division titles (2006, 2007, 2008, 2010, 2011, 2012), four MAC regular-season titles (2006, 2008, 2011, 2012), and five MAC tournament championships (2007, 2009, 2010, 2011, 2012). The team has made five trips to the NCAA tournament under Sticklin, including four consecutive from 2009–12. The Flashes earned their first tournament win under Sticklin in the 2009 tournament and advanced to their first regional final since 2001 in the 2011 NCAA Division I baseball tournament with wins over Texas State and host Texas.

In 2012, the Flashes won their fourth consecutive MAC tournament title and advanced to the 2012 NCAA Division I baseball tournament. The Flashes first won the Gary Regional as the region's third seed with a 3–0 record, which began with a 7–6, 21-inning win over Kentucky in the 2nd longest game in tournament history. The win was followed by a 7–4 victory over host Purdue and a 3–2 win over Kentucky in the regional final. The Flashes advanced to the Super Regional series in Eugene, Oregon, against host Oregon and won the series 2–1 with a series-clinching run in the bottom of the ninth inning of game three. During the series, the team's winning streak reached 21 games before a 3–2 Oregon win in the second game of the series. In the 2012 College World Series, after falling to Arkansas 8–1 in the opener, the Flashes defeated national top seed Florida 5–4. A 4–1 loss to defending national champion and eventual 2012 runner-up South Carolina ended the Flashes' run, giving them a national fifth-place finish. Kent State's appearance in the College World Series marked the first appearance by any Mid-American Conference team since the 1976 Eastern Michigan Eagles and first ever by a MAC team at both the Super Regional round and College World Series since the NCAA tournament expanded to 64 teams. The Flashes were also the first team from the state of Ohio to appear in the College World Series since the 1970 Ohio Bobcats.

The Flashes have also continued to have multiple players drafted into the major leagues. In 1994, seven Kent State players were selected in the Major League Baseball draft and the Flashes have had players selected in every draft since 1990 except 1998, including six in 2009, five in 2011, and six in 2012 Through the 2012 season, Stricklin has a record of 314–165 (.656), which included a program best 47–20 mark in 2012 and a 45–17 record in 2011. He won his 200th game at KSU on April 9, 2010, at Oestrike Stadium in Ypsilanti, Michigan, 16–1 over the Eastern Michigan Eagles. Stricklin's 300th career win came May 14, 2012, with a 10–4 win over the Miami Redhawks in Kent. Following the 2013 season where the Flashes won the regular-season MAC title, Stricklin was hired by Georgia as their head coach. Stricklin's record at Kent State is 350–188 (.651).

==== Jeff Duncan ====
Jeff Duncan was hired as head coach in June 2013. In his first season, Kent State finished second in the MAC East Division, but won their 11th MAC tournament title with a 3–0 win over arch-rival Akron in the championship game to advance to the NCAA tournament. The following season, the Flashes won their 10th MAC East title, but were eliminated in two games at the MAC tournament. Through the 2015 season, Duncan has an overall record of 65–45 and 34–20 in MAC play. On March 14, 2026 Jeff Duncan reached his 400th win as the coach of the Flashes.

== Postseason ==
Kent State has made 28 appearances in the Mid-American Conference baseball tournament, winning 12 titles through 2026. The tournament was first held in 1981 but discontinued from 1984 through 1991 and again in 2020. The Flashes made their first appearance in the 1992 tournament, which was also their first tournament title, and have qualified for every tournament since then except 2005. From 1981 through 1983 and 1992 through 1997, the tournament included only the top four teams in the conference. It was expanded to six teams in 1998 and eight teams in 2008. After being canceled in 2020 and discontinued for 2021, the tournament was restored for 2022 as a four-team tournament and retains the double-elimination format. During the years the tournament has been hosted by the top seed, Kent State has hosted the tournament eight times. Through the 2026 tournament, the Flashes' overall tournament record is 75–44 (.630) and their 12 titles are the most in conference history.

Mid-American Conference baseball tournament
Year	Seed	Location	Round	Result
1992	1st	Gene Michael Field • Kent, Ohio,	First	W 2–1 over (4) Ball State
1992	1st	Gene Michael Field • Kent, Ohio,	Semifinal	L 7–6 to (3) Central Michigan
1992	1st	Gene Michael Field • Kent, Ohio,	Semifinal	W 10–4 over (2) Ohio
1992	1st	Gene Michael Field • Kent, Ohio,	Championship	W 9–3 over (3) Central Michigan
1992	1st	Gene Michael Field • Kent, Ohio,	Championship	W 3–1 over (3) Central Michigan
1993	1st	Gene Michael Field • Kent, Ohio,	First	L 1–0 to (4) Ball State
1993	1st	Gene Michael Field • Kent, Ohio,	First	W 6–0 over (2) Central Michigan
1993	1st	Gene Michael Field • Kent, Ohio,	Semifinal	W 5–4 over (3) Western Michigan
1993	1st	Gene Michael Field • Kent, Ohio,	Championship	W 8–1 over (4) Ball State
1993	1st	Gene Michael Field • Kent, Ohio,	Championship	W 3–1 over (4) Ball State
1994	1st	Gene Michael Field • Kent, Ohio,	First	L 1–0 to (4) Central Michigan
1994	1st	Gene Michael Field • Kent, Ohio,	First	W 5–1 over (3) Bowling Green
1994	1st	Gene Michael Field • Kent, Ohio,	Semifinal	W 9–7 over Ohio
1994	1st	Gene Michael Field • Kent, Ohio,	Championship	L 5–4 (11) to (4) Central Michigan
1995	2nd	Steller Field • Bowling Green, Ohio,	First	L 3–0 to (3) Central Michigan
1995	2nd	Steller Field • Bowling Green, Ohio,	First	W 5–2 over (1) Bowling Green
1995	2nd	Steller Field • Bowling Green, Ohio,	Semifinal	W 16–3 over (4) Akron
1995	2nd	Steller Field • Bowling Green, Ohio,	Championship	W 11–6 over (3) Central Michigan
1995	2nd	Steller Field • Bowling Green, Ohio,	Championship	L 7–4 to (3) Central Michigan
1996	1st	Gene Michael Field • Kent, Ohio,	First	L 4–1 to (4) Akron
1996	1st	Gene Michael Field • Kent, Ohio,	First	L 7–2 to (3) Toledo
1997	3rd	Trautwein Field • Athens, Ohio,	First	L 17–5 to (2) Ball State
1997	3rd	Trautwein Field • Athens, Ohio,	First	W 9–6 over (4) Miami
1997	3rd	Trautwein Field • Athens, Ohio,	Semifinal	W 18–10 over (2) Ball State
1997	3rd	Trautwein Field • Athens, Ohio,	Championship	L 7–6 to (1) Ohio
1998	2nd-E	Steller Field • Bowling Green, Ohio,	First	L 8–0 to (1W) Central Michigan
1998	2nd-E	Steller Field • Bowling Green, Ohio,	Second	L 3–1 to (1E) Bowling Green
1999	3rd-E	Steller Field • Bowling Green, Ohio,	First	L 4–1 to (1W) Ball State
1999	3rd-E	Steller Field • Bowling Green, Ohio,	Second	W 7–5 over (3W) Western Michigan
1999	3rd-E	Steller Field • Bowling Green, Ohio,	Semifinal	L 9–7 to (2E) Miami
2000	1st-E	Gene Michael Field • Kent, Ohio,	First	W 10–4 to (3W) Northern Illinois
2000	1st-E	Gene Michael Field • Kent, Ohio,	Second	L 7–1 to (2W) Ball State
2000	1st-E	Gene Michael Field • Kent, Ohio,	Second	L 3–1 to (2E) Ohio
2001	4th	Ball Diamond • Muncie, Indiana	First	W 26–10 over (3) Ohio
2001	4th	Ball Diamond • Muncie, Indiana	Second	W 5–1 over (5) Central Michigan
2001	4th	Ball Diamond • Muncie, Indiana	Semifinal	L 10–9 to (6) Miami
2001	4th	Ball Diamond • Muncie, Indiana	Semifinal	W 13–3 over (1) Ball State
2001	4th	Ball Diamond • Muncie, Indiana	Championship	W 9–8 over (6) Miami
2001	4th	Ball Diamond • Muncie, Indiana	Championship	W 8–3 over (6) Miami
2002	3rd	Steller Field • Bowling Green, Ohio,	First	W 13–4 over (4) Ball State
2002	3rd	Steller Field • Bowling Green, Ohio,	Second	W 18–8 over (5) Central Michigan
2002	3rd	Steller Field • Bowling Green, Ohio,	Semifinal	W 2–0 over (5) Central Michigan
2002	3rd	Steller Field • Bowling Green, Ohio,	Championship	L 16–9 to (4) Ball State
2002	3rd	Steller Field • Bowling Green, Ohio,	Championship	W 13–4 over (4) Ball State
2003	1st	Gene Michael Field • Kent, Ohio,	First	L 4–3 to (6) Northern Illinois
2003	1st	Gene Michael Field • Kent, Ohio,	Second	W 3–2 (10) over (2) Ball State
2003	1st	Gene Michael Field • Kent, Ohio,	Semifinal	L 7–4 to (4) Eastern Michigan
2004	6th	Theunissen Stadium • Mount Pleasant, Michigan,	First	W 6–0 over (1) Central Michigan
2004	6th	Theunissen Stadium • Mount Pleasant, Michigan,	Semifinal	L 4–0 to (4) Ball State
2004	6th	Theunissen Stadium • Mount Pleasant, Michigan,	Semifinal	W 10–6 over (3) Eastern Michigan
2004	6th	Theunissen Stadium • Mount Pleasant, Michigan,	Championship	W 7–4 over (3) Eastern Michigan
2006	1st	Schoonover Stadium • Kent, Ohio,	First	W 2–1 over (6) Eastern Michigan
2006	1st	Schoonover Stadium • Kent, Ohio,	Second	W over (4) Western Michigan
2006	1st	Schoonover Stadium • Kent, Ohio,	Semifinal	L 5–4(11) to (4) Ball State
2006	1st	Schoonover Stadium • Kent, Ohio,	Semifinal	W 11–1 over (5) Miami
2006	1st	Schoonover Stadium • Kent, Ohio,	Championship	L 7–4 to (4) Ball State
2007	2nd	Oestrike Stadium • Ypsilanti, Michigan,	First	W 7–3 over (5) Northern Illinois
2007	2nd	Oestrike Stadium • Ypsilanti, Michigan,	Second	W 4–3 over (4) Miami
2007	2nd	Oestrike Stadium • Ypsilanti, Michigan,	Semifinal	W 3–2 over (1) Eastern Michigan
2007	2nd	Oestrike Stadium • Ypsilanti, Michigan,	Championship	W 3–2 over (1) Eastern Michigan
2008	1st	V.A. Memorial Stadium • Chillicothe, Ohio,	First	W 4–2 over (8) Central Michigan
2008	1st	V.A. Memorial Stadium • Chillicothe, Ohio,	Second	W 10–6 over (4) Northern Illinois
2008	1st	V.A. Memorial Stadium • Chillicothe, Ohio,	Semifinal	W 10–4 over (4) Northern Illinois
2008	1st	V.A. Memorial Stadium • Chillicothe, Ohio,	Championship	L 12–4 to (2) Eastern Michigan
2009	4th	V.A. Memorial Stadium • Chillicothe, Ohio,	First	W 6–4 over (5) Miami
2009	4th	V.A. Memorial Stadium • Chillicothe, Ohio,	Second	W 17–2 over (8) Central Michigan
2009	4th	V.A. Memorial Stadium • Chillicothe, Ohio,	Semifinal	W 12–8 over (5) Miami
2009	4th	V.A. Memorial Stadium • Chillicothe, Ohio,	Championship	W 5–3 over (6) Toledo
2010	2nd	V.A. Memorial Stadium • Chillicothe, Ohio,	First	L 12–4 to (7) Eastern Michigan
2010	2nd	V.A. Memorial Stadium • Chillicothe, Ohio,	Second	W 4–3 over (3) Toledo
2010	2nd	V.A. Memorial Stadium • Chillicothe, Ohio,	Semifinal	W 15–1 over (7) Eastern Michigan
2010	2nd	V.A. Memorial Stadium • Chillicothe, Ohio,	Semifinal	W 9–8 over (7) Eastern Michigan
2010	2nd	V.A. Memorial Stadium • Chillicothe, Ohio,	Championship	W 5–3 over (1) Central Michigan
2011	1st	V.A. Memorial Stadium • Chillicothe, Ohio,	First	W 6–2 over (8) Bowling Green
2011	1st	V.A. Memorial Stadium • Chillicothe, Ohio,	Second	W 5–4 over (4) Eastern Michigan
2011	1st	V.A. Memorial Stadium • Chillicothe, Ohio,	Semifinal	L 4–2 to (4) Eastern Michigan
2011	1st	V.A. Memorial Stadium • Chillicothe, Ohio,	Semifinal	W 8–0 over (4) Eastern Michigan
2011	1st	V.A. Memorial Stadium • Chillicothe, Ohio,	Championship	W 11–0 over (3) Miami
2012	1st	All Pro Freight Stadium • Avon, Ohio,	First	W 9–0 over (8) Buffalo
2012	1st	All Pro Freight Stadium • Avon, Ohio,	Second	W 12–3 over (5) Western Michigan
2012	1st	All Pro Freight Stadium • Avon, Ohio,	Semifinal	W 8–3 over (8) Buffalo
2012	1st	All Pro Freight Stadium • Avon, Ohio,	Championship	W 3–1 over (3) Central Michigan
2013	1st	All Pro Freight Stadium • Avon, Ohio,	First	W 15–8 over (8) Central Michigan
2013	1st	All Pro Freight Stadium • Avon, Ohio,	Second	L 3–1 to (4) Ball State
2013	1st	All Pro Freight Stadium • Avon, Ohio,	Second	W 7–0 over (5) Miami
2013	1st	All Pro Freight Stadium • Avon, Ohio,	Semifinal	L 4–1 to (4) Ball State
2014	4th	All Pro Freight Stadium • Avon, Ohio,	First	W 6–2 over (5) Bowling Green
2014	4th	All Pro Freight Stadium • Avon, Ohio,	Second	W 4–3 over (1) Ball State
2014	4th	All Pro Freight Stadium • Avon, Ohio,	Semifinal	W 12–2 over Western Michigan
2014	4th	All Pro Freight Stadium • Avon, Ohio,	Championship	W 3–0 over Akron
2015	2nd	All Pro Freight Stadium • Avon, Ohio,	First	L 5–0 to (7) Western Michigan
2015	2nd	All Pro Freight Stadium • Avon, Ohio,	First	L 6–3 to (6) Bowling Green
2016	1st	All Pro Freight Stadium • Avon, Ohio,	First	W 1–0 over (8) Eastern Michigan
2016	1st	All Pro Freight Stadium • Avon, Ohio,	Second	W 3–2 over (5) Toledo
2016	1st	All Pro Freight Stadium • Avon, Ohio,	Semifinal	L 10–5 to (8) Eastern Michigan
2016	1st	All Pro Freight Stadium • Avon, Ohio,	Semifinal	W 4–2 over (8) Eastern Michigan
2016	1st	All Pro Freight Stadium • Avon, Ohio,	Championship	L 12–7 to (7) Western Michigan
2017	1st	Sprenger Stadium • Avon, Ohio	First	W 8–0 vs (8) Toledo
2017	1st	Sprenger Stadium • Avon, Ohio	Second	L 5–3 to (5) Ohio
2017	1st	Sprenger Stadium • Avon, Ohio	Second	W 6–3 over (8) Toledo
2017	1st	Sprenger Stadium • Avon, Ohio	Semifinal	L 7–2 to (5) Ohio
2018	1st	Sprenger Stadium • Avon, Ohio	Second	W 8–7 over (4) Central Michigan
2018	1st	Sprenger Stadium • Avon, Ohio	Semifinal	W 7–2 over (2) Miami
2018	1st	Sprenger Stadium • Avon, Ohio	Championship	W 14–0 over (2) Miami
2019	3rd	Sprenger Stadium • Avon, Ohio,	First	L 7–3 to (6) Ohio
2019	3rd	Sprenger Stadium • Avon, Ohio,	First	L 6–3 to (4) Miami
2020	Cancelled due to the coronavirus pandemic			
2023	1st	Schoonover Stadium • Kent, Ohio	First	W 6–4 over (4) Western Michigan
2023	1st	Schoonover Stadium • Kent, Ohio	Second	L 6–1 to (3) Ball State
2023	1st	Schoonover Stadium • Kent, Ohio	Second	W 10–2 over (2) Central Michigan
2023	1st	Schoonover Stadium • Kent, Ohio	Championship	L 12–9 to (3) Ball State
2024	5th	Crushers Stadium • Avon, Ohio	First	L 5–2 to (4) Miami
2024	5th	Crushers Stadium • Avon, Ohio	First	L 8–2 to (6) Toledo
2025	2nd	Crushers Stadium • Avon, Ohio	First	W 9–8 over (3) Ball State
2025	2nd	Crushers Stadium • Avon, Ohio	Second	L 6–1 to (1) Miami
2025	2nd	Crushers Stadium • Avon, Ohio	Second	L 6–2 to (5) Toledo
2026	2nd	ForeFront Field • Avon, Ohio	First	L 8–0 to (3) Toledo
2026	2nd	ForeFront Field • Avon, Ohio	First	W 3–1 over (1) Miami
2026	2nd	ForeFront Field • Avon, Ohio	Second	W 6–1 over (5) Western Michigan
2026	2nd	ForeFront Field • Avon, Ohio	Semifinal	L 5–2 to (3) Toledo
Totals: 19 championship game appearances, 12 titles, 75–44 record in tournament

=== NCAA tournament ===
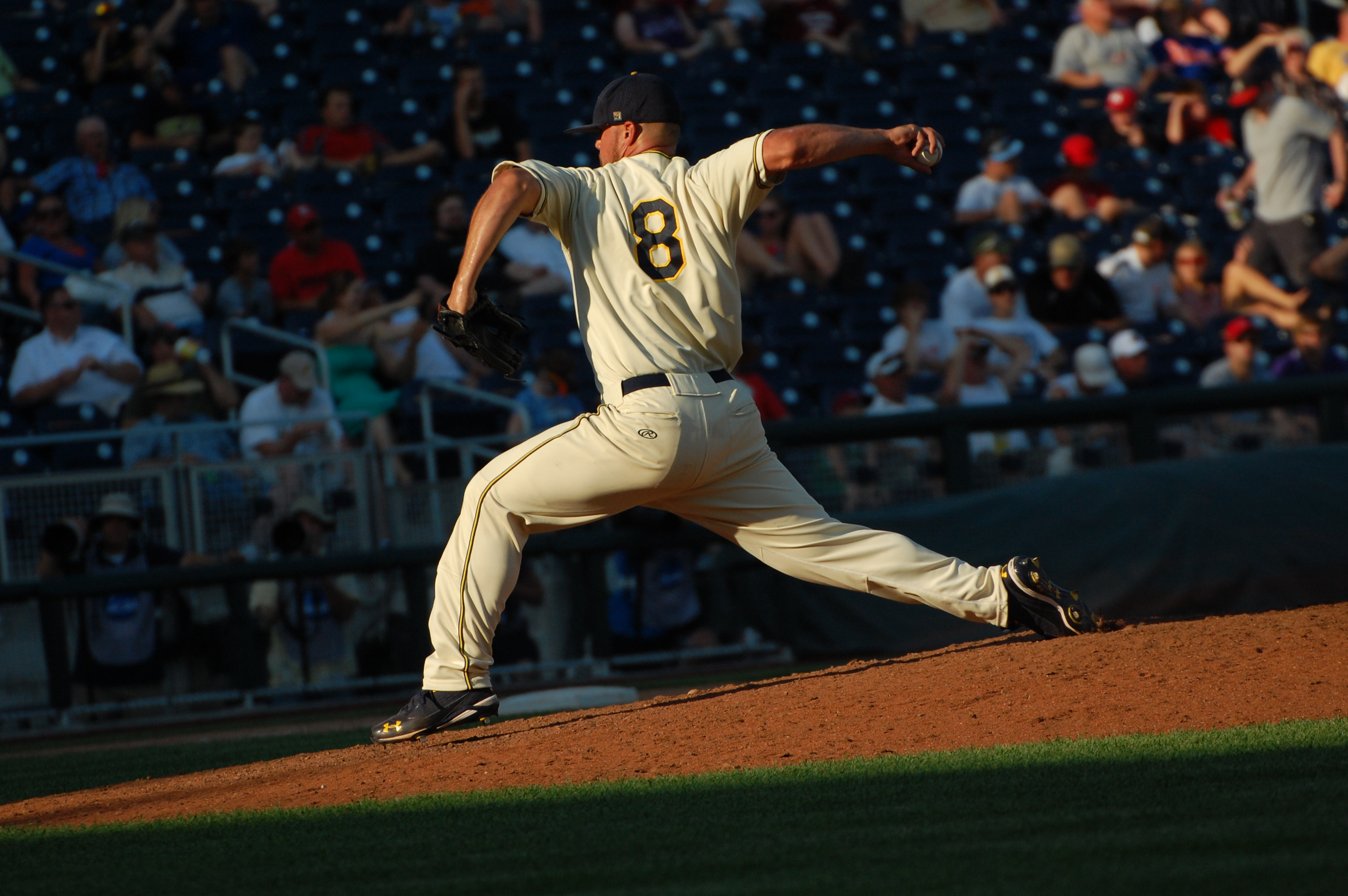
Josh Pierce pitching in the 2012 College World Series

Kent State has participated in the NCAA Division I Baseball Championship 14 times, making their first appearance in 1964 when they hosted the eventual national champion Minnesota Golden Gophers in the regional round. They have qualified automatically as champions of the MAC for every NCAA tournament appearance except 1994, when they were selected as an at-large team. Through the 2018 appearance the team has a 16–29 (.356) record in the tournament. The Flashes have one regional title and one super regional championship, both won in 2012.

NCAA Division I Baseball Championship
Year	Seed	Location	Round	Result
1964		Memorial Field • Kent, Ohio,	Regional	L 7–4 to Minnesota
1964		Memorial Field • Kent, Ohio,	Regional	L 13–2 to Minnesota
1992	4th	Dick Howser Stadium • Tallahassee, Florida,	Regional	W 5–2 over (3) Georgia
1992	4th	Dick Howser Stadium • Tallahassee, Florida,	Regional	L 14–1 to (5) Western Carolina
1992	4th	Dick Howser Stadium • Tallahassee, Florida,	Regional	L 4–2 to (3) Florida State
1993	3rd	Alex Box Stadium • Baton Rouge, Louisiana,	Regional	L 4–1 to (4) Baylor
1993	3rd	Alex Box Stadium • Baton Rouge, Louisiana,	Regional	W 15–12 over (1) LSU
1993	3rd	Alex Box Stadium • Baton Rouge, Louisiana,	Regional	W 8–5 over (6) Western Carolina
1993	3rd	Alex Box Stadium • Baton Rouge, Louisiana,	Regional	L 7–6 to (5) South Alabama
1994	3rd	Mark Light Field • Coral Gables, Florida,	Regional	L 11–6 to (4) Minnesota
1994	3rd	Mark Light Field • Coral Gables, Florida,	Regional	L 4–1 to (1) Miami
2001	4th	Bill Davis Stadium • Columbus, Ohio,	Regional	L 9–8 to (1) Mississippi State
2001	4th	Bill Davis Stadium • Columbus, Ohio,	Regional	W 9–8 over (2) Ohio State
2001	4th	Bill Davis Stadium • Columbus, Ohio,	Regional	W 12–11 over (3) Delaware
2001	4th	Bill Davis Stadium • Columbus, Ohio,	Regional	L 14–4 to (1) Mississippi State
2002	4th	Frank Eck Stadium • Notre Dame, Indiana	Regional	L 7–4 to (1) South Alabama
2002	4th	Frank Eck Stadium • Notre Dame, Indiana	Regional	L 12–8 to (3) Ohio State
2004	4th	Frank Eck Stadium • Notre Dame, Indiana	Regional	W 2–1 over (1) Notre Dame
2004	4th	Frank Eck Stadium • Notre Dame, Indiana	Regional	L 7–4 to (3) Arizona
2004	4th	Frank Eck Stadium • Notre Dame, Indiana	Regional	L 7–1 to (1) Notre Dame
2007	4th	Taylor Stadium • Columbia, Missouri	Regional	L 10–2 to (1) Missouri
2007	4th	Taylor Stadium • Columbia, Missouri	Regional	L 8–7 to (2) Miami
2009	4th	Packard Stadium • Tempe, Arizona	Regional	L 17–6 to (1) Arizona State
2009	4th	Packard Stadium • Tempe, Arizona	Regional	W 10–9 over (3) Cal Poly
2009	4th	Packard Stadium • Tempe, Arizona	Regional	L 15–10 to (2) Oral Roberts
2010	4th	Jackie Robinson Stadium • Los Angeles	Regional	L 15–1 to (1) UCLA
2010	4th	Jackie Robinson Stadium • Los Angeles	Regional	L 19–9 to UC Irvine
2011	3rd	UFCU Disch–Falk Field • Austin, Texas,	Regional	W 4–2 over (2) Texas State
2011	3rd	UFCU Disch–Falk Field • Austin, Texas,	Regional	W 7–5 over (1) Texas
2011	3rd	UFCU Disch–Falk Field • Austin, Texas,	Regional	L 9–3 to (1) Texas
2011	3rd	UFCU Disch–Falk Field • Austin, Texas,	Regional	L 5–0 to (1) Texas
2012	3rd	U.S. Steel Yard • Gary, Indiana	Regional	W 7–6(21) over (2) Kentucky
2012	3rd	U.S. Steel Yard • Gary, Indiana	Regional	W 7–3 over (1) Purdue
2012	3rd	U.S. Steel Yard • Gary, Indiana	Regional	W 3–2 over (2) Kentucky
2012		PK Park • Eugene, Oregon	Super Regional	W 7–6 over (5) Oregon
2012		PK Park • Eugene, Oregon	Super Regional	L 3–2 to (5) Oregon
2012		PK Park • Eugene, Oregon	Super Regional	W 3–2 over (5) Oregon
2012		TD Ameritrade Park • Omaha, Nebraska,	College World Series	L 8–1 to Arkansas
2012		TD Ameritrade Park • Omaha, Nebraska,	College World Series	W 5–4 over (1) Florida
2012		TD Ameritrade Park • Omaha, Nebraska,	College World Series	L 4–1 to South Carolina
2014	4th	Jim Patterson Stadium • Louisville, Kentucky,	Regional	L 5–0 to (1) Louisville
2014	4th	Jim Patterson Stadium • Louisville, Kentucky,	Regional	L 4–2 to (2) Kentucky
2018	3rd	Dan Law Field at Rip Griffin Park • Lubbock, Texas,	Regional	L 13–6 to (2) Louisville
2018	3rd	Dan Law Field at Rip Griffin Park • Lubbock, Texas,	Regional	W 2–1 over (4) New Mexico State
2018	3rd	Dan Law Field at Rip Griffin Park • Lubbock, Texas,	Regional	L 12–6 to (2) Louisville
Totals: 14 tournament appearances, 1 regional title, 1 super regional championship, 16–29 record in tournament

== Coaches ==
Through the 2017 season, Kent State has had 17 head coaches in program history. In the early years of the program, a number of the head coaches also served in the same capacity for another sport, with two coaches serving as head coach for three sports. Alexander Whyte, the head custodian of the school, was also the first head coach of the men's basketball team for two seasons, from 1913–1915. Paul Chandler, who was a professor of education at Kent State, was the first head coach of the football team and coached football for the team's first three seasons (1920–1922) and men's basketball for four seasons (1919–1923) in addition to his duties during the 1922 baseball season. Merle Wagoner, a professor in physical education, was head coach for all three teams—football, men's basketball, and baseball—at the same time for eight seasons from 1925–1933, while Starn coached football for eight seasons (1935–1942) in addition to his three seasons as baseball head coach from 1936–1938.

There are no records of teams from 1917 through 1921 due to most male students being involved in World War I. This was repeated from 1943 through 1946 because of World War II. The 1923 and 1924 seasons are mentioned in the Kent State yearbooks, known as the Chestnut Burr, from 1924 and 1925, but no head coach or season results are included. There is no record of the 1925 season in the subsequent 1926 Chestnut Burr.

Coach	Years	Seasons	Overall		MAC		MAC championships			NCAA
Coach	Years	Seasons	Win–loss–tie	Percent	Win–loss–tie	Percent	East Division	Overall	Tournament	NCAA
Alexander Whyte	1914–1915	2	1–3	.250	—	—	—	—	—	—
Alf Lovall	1916	1	1–3	.250	—	—	—	—	—	—
No team, 1917–21 (World War I)
Paul Chandler	1922	1	3–0	1.000	—	—	—	—	—	—
1923 and 1924 seasons mentioned; no coach or records listed
No results or team mentioned, 1925
Merle Wagoner	1926–1933	8	27–34	.443	—	—	—	—	—	—
Gus Peterka	1934–1935	2	9–5	.625	—	—	—	—	—	—
Donald Starn	1936–1938	3	18–9	.667	—	—	—	—	—	—
John Starrett	1939–1942	4	25–14	.641	—	—	—	—	—	—
Wesley Stevens	1947–1948	2	18–14–1	.561	—	—	—	—	—	—
Matt Resick	1949–1961	13	132–100–1	.569	50–50	.500	—	—	—	—
Dick Paskert	1962–1971	10	103–116–4	.471	45–59–1	.433	—	1964	—	Regional: 1964
Art Welch	1972–1981	10	132–215–3	.381	37–117–1	.242	—	—	—	—
Bob Morgan	1982–1983	2	79–39	.669	14–17	.452	—	—	—	—
Bob Todd	1984–1987	4	124–82	.602	65–54	.546	—	—	—	—
Danny Hall	1988–1993	6	208–117	.640	106–73	.592	—	1992, 1993	1992, 1993	Regional: 1992, 1993
Rick Rembielak	1994–2004	11	373–251–1	.598	200–100	.667	2000, 2003	1994, 1996, 2000, 2003	2001, 2002, 2004	Regional: 1994, 2001, 2002, 2004
Scott Stricklin	2004–2013	9	350–188	.651	161–61	.725	2006, 2007, 2008, 2010, 2011, 2012, 2013	2006, 2008, 2011, 2012, 2013	2007, 2009, 2010, 2011, 2012	Regional: 2007, 2009, 2010, 2011, 2012; Super regional: 2012; CWS: 2012
Jeff Duncan	2014–present	11	386–240	.617	213–108	.664	2015, 2016, 2017	2016, 2017, 2018, 2023, 2025	2014, 2018	Regional: 2014, 2018
17 coaches		99 seasons	1,966–1,414–10	.933	868–632–2	.579	12 MAC East titles	17 MAC titles	12 MAC Tournament titles	14 regional 1 super regional 1 College World Series appearances

== Facilities ==
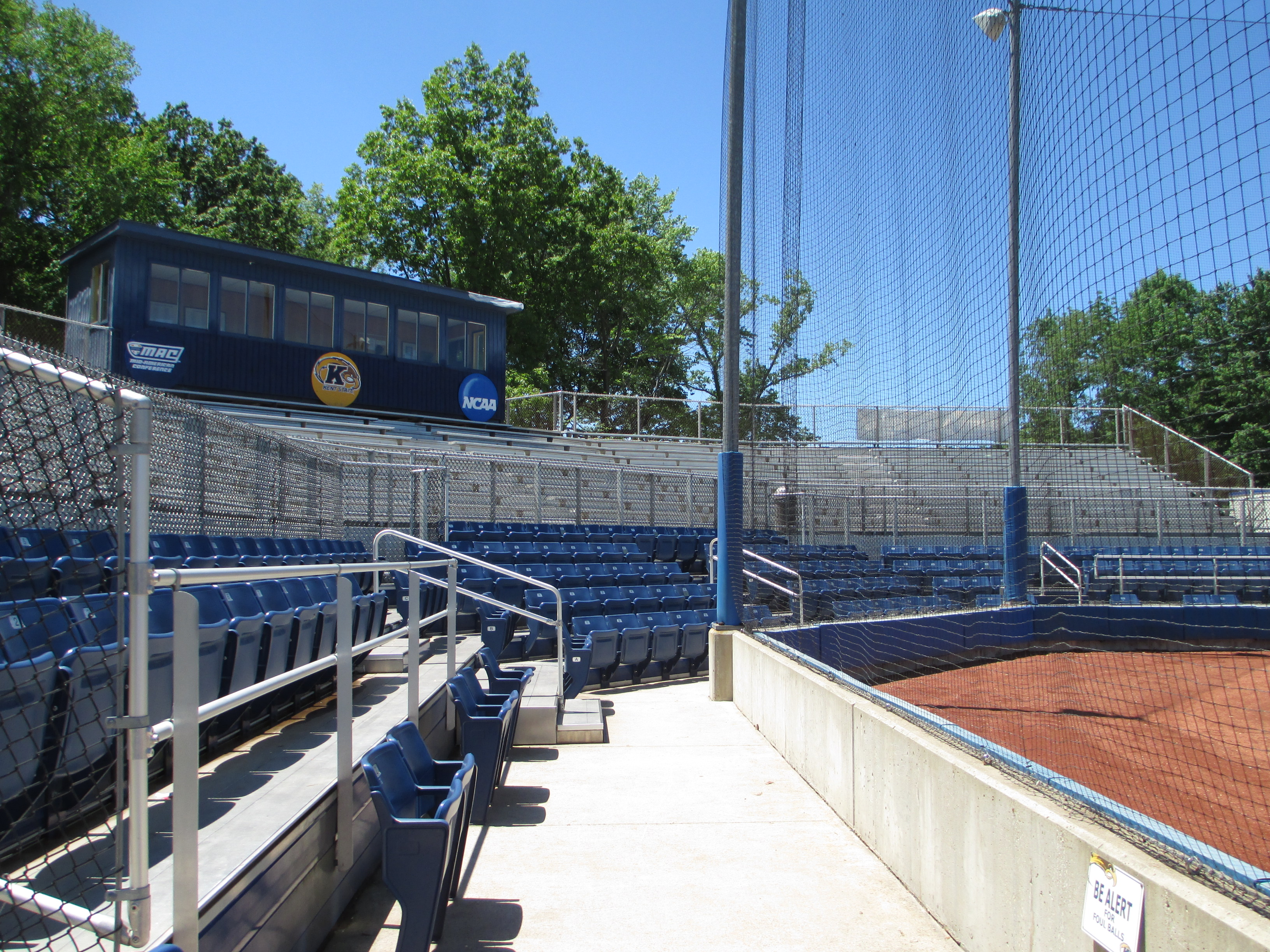
Schoonover Stadium stands in 2014

The Flashes home field is Schoonover Stadium, located on the southern edge of the Kent State campus. The team has played on the field since 1966. From 1990–2003, it was known as Gene Michael Field, named for the Major League Baseball player and manager who is a Kent native and played collegiately for the Golden Flashes. It was renamed for Kent State alumnus Hal Schoonover and his wife Julie in 2003 after the Schoonover Foundation donated $1.53 million to fund renovations. The field is named for local philanthropist Olga Mural after a $1 million donation in 2006. The 2005 renovations included new dugouts, a new scoreboard, replacement of the natural grass field with a FieldTurf playing surface, new bullpens, and a press box. Additional renovations in 2007 added chairback seating to the main grandstand, new restrooms, a concession stand, and a new locker room and player's lounge connected to the home dugout, followed in 2008 by a scoreboard upgrade. Following the team's run to the 2012 College World Series, permanent lights were added for the 2013 season. Prior to the 2014 season, a new parking area was built adjacent to the stadium along with a new entrance. Additional upgrades to the seating area are also planned as of 2015.

Adjacent to the stadium is the David and Peggy Edmonds Baseball and Softball Training Facility, which was dedicated in October 2014. The building includes a large indoor space with pitching mounds and moveable batting cages and an artificial turf playing surface. A weight room and offices for both the baseball and softball coaching staffs are also located in the facility.

In September 2025 a bronze statue in honor of Thurmond Munson was installed outside the entrance of the stadium. Munson's widow, Diana Munson was present at the unveiling ceremony.

== Rivalries ==
Record vs. current Mid-American Conference teams (through 2026)
Team	Games	Wins–losses	Percentage	Streak
Akron	188	127–60–1	.678	W5
Ball State	146	79–67	.541	W2
Bowling Green	212	139–73	.656	W1
Central Michigan	135	70–65	.519	W10
Eastern Michigan	139	89–50	.640	W1
Miami	223	125–97–1	.563	W1
Northern Illinois	81	52–28–1	.648	L1
Ohio	208	96–111–1	.464	W7
Toledo	194	113–80–1	.585	L3
Western Michigan	179	93–87	.517	W1
Non-conference rivals
Youngstown State	98	75–22–1	.778	W4
Dormant rivalries
Team	Games	Wins–losses	Percentage	Years
Cleveland State	88	68–20	.773	1933–2011

The team's arch-rival is the Akron Zips from the University of Akron in Akron, Ohio. The two teams both play in the Mid-American Conference and are separated by approximately 10 miles (16 km). The series began in 1916 with a 12–1 Akron win in Kent, but did not become a conference game until 1993 when Akron joined the Mid-American Conference. The rivalry unexpectedly ended after the 2015 season when the University of Akron announced the baseball team would be eliminated because of budget concerns. This was later reversed and Akron reinstated the baseball team for the 2020 season. The rivalry was scheduled to resume April 1 with a game in Kent, followed by a rematch April 28 at Canal Park in downtown Akron, the home of the AA-level minor league Akron RubberDucks. The games were canceled in March 2020, along with the remainder of the 2020 season due to the COVID-19 pandemic. Instead, the rivalry resumed in 2021, with five games in Kent, where the Flashes took three of five. Through the 2026 season, Kent State leads the series 127–60–1.

The Zips and Flashes have met three times in the Mid-American Conference baseball tournament, with Kent State taking two of the three games. The Flashes defeated the Zips 16–3 in their first tournament meeting, a 1995 semifinal game, while the Zips claimed a 4–1 win in the first round of the 1996 tournament. The most recent tournament meeting between the two rivals was the championship game of the 2014 tournament, a 3–0 Kent State win and the only time the two teams met in the tournament final.

From 2007 to 2015, the Zips and Flashes played in the annual Diamond Classic for Kids at Canal Park to benefit Akron Children's Hospital. Leading up to the game, players and mascots from both schools visited children in the hospital, which overlooks Canal Park. The 2007, 2008, and 2009 games were all played in addition to the regularly scheduled conference series and the game itself was a non-conference game. Beginning in 2010, the game was made part of the 3-game series regardless of which team was hosting in the given year and counted in the conference standings.

Kent State's most frequent opponents through 2026 are long-time MAC rivals, with the Miami RedHawks being the most frequent at 223 meetings, followed by the Bowling Green Falcons at 212 games, and the Ohio Bobcats at 207. The series with Bowling Green began in 1936 and has been a conference game since the Falcons started MAC play in 1953, while Miami and Ohio were members of the MAC when Kent State started conference play in 1952.

Outside the MAC, the Flashes most common opponent is the Youngstown State Penguins of nearby Youngstown, Ohio, a member of the Horizon League. The two teams meet on a regular basis and typically play at least one game per season at each home field. The Flashes and Penguins have met 98 times, with Kent State holding a 75–22–1 edge in the series through 2026. KSU also has regular series with the Pitt Panthers from the University of Pittsburgh and the Ohio State Buckeyes from The Ohio State University.

Kent State also had a regular rivalry with the Cleveland State Vikings that began in 1933 and spanned 88 games. The rivalry ended in 2011 after Cleveland State elected to discontinue their baseball program. Kent State won the final meeting between the two teams 6–2, a game that was a home game for the Vikings, but was played in Kent at Schoonover Stadium due to a rainout and scheduling conflict at the original site.

== Awards ==
MAC Pitcher of the Year
Name	Year
Brian Schubert	1990
Bill Underwood	1992
Mike Nartker	1993, 1995
Travis Miller	1994
Ted Rose	1996
Dirk Hayhurst	2003
Chris Carpenter	2008
Kyle Hallock	2011
David Starn	2012
Eric Lauer	2016
Joey Murray	2017, 2018
MAC Defensive Player of the Year
Micah Rienstra-Kiracofe	2026

MAC Player of the Year
Name	Year
Dave Bettendorf	1987
Mike Gulan	1992
John Van Benschoten	2001
Emmanuel Burriss	2006
Greg Rohan	2008
George Roberts	2012
MAC Freshman of the Year
Bill Underwood	1990
Ryan Beeney	1992
Andrew Chafin	2009
Justin Kirby	2019
Sawyer Solitaria	2025

MAC Coach of the Year
Name	Year
Danny Hall	1992, 1993
Rick Rembielak	1996, 2000, 2003
Scott Stricklin	2006, 2011, 2012
Jeff Duncan	2016, 2017, 2018

=== All-Americans ===
Through the 2016 season, Kent State has had 20 players named as first, second, and third team All-Americans by various collegiate baseball organizations and publications. Two players have been named consensus First Team All-Americans in program history, John Van Benschoten in 2001 and Eric Lauer in 2016. Lauer was also named National Player of the Year by Collegiate Baseball Newspaper in 2016.

All-Americans
Name	Year	Team	Organization
Thurman Munson	1968	First	American Baseball Coaches Association
George Spiroff	1980	Third	American Baseball Coaches Association
Jeff Tabaka	1986	Third	American Baseball Coaches Association
Mike Gulan	1992	Third; Second; Third	American Baseball Coaches Association; Baseball America; Collegiate Baseball Newspaper
Matt Rundels	1992	Third	American Baseball Coaches Association
Mike Nartker	1993	Third	American Baseball Coaches Association
Ted Rose	1996	Third	American Baseball Coaches Association
John Van Benschoten	2001	First	American Baseball Coaches Association; Baseball America; Collegiate Baseball Newspaper
Adam Crowder	2003	Third	American Baseball Coaches Association
Emmanuel Burriss	2006	Third; Second	American Baseball Coaches Association; Baseball America
Drew Saylor	2006	First	Collegiate Baseball Newspaper
Greg Rohan	2008	Third	Collegiate Baseball Newspaper
Anthony Gallas	2010	Third	Collegiate Baseball Newspaper
Andrew Chafin	2011	Second	Perfect Game
Kyle Hallock	2011	Third	Collegiate Baseball Newspaper
Kyle McMillen	2011	Third	Collegiate Baseball Newspaper
Jimmy Rider	2012	Second; First; First; Second; Second	American Baseball Coaches Association; Baseball America; Collegiate Baseball Newspaper; Perfect Game; CollegeBaseballInsider.com
George Roberts	2012	Second	Collegiate Baseball Newspaper
David Starn	2012	Third; Second	American Baseball Coaches Association; Collegiate Baseball Newspaper
Eric Lauer	2016	First	American Baseball Coaches Association; Baseball America; Collegiate Baseball Newspaper; D1Baseball.com; National Collegiate Baseball Writers Association

== See also ==
- List of NCAA Division I baseball programs
