= 2001 Mid-American Conference baseball tournament =

American collegiate baseball tournament

- Teams: 6
- Format: Double-elimination
- Finals site: Ball Diamond; Muncie, IN
- Champions: Kent State (3rd title)
- Winning coach: Rick Rembielak (1st title)
- MVP: John VanBenschoten (Kent State)

2001 Mid-American Conference baseball standings
	Conf.				Overall
Team	W		L	PCT	W		L	PCT
East
Bowling Green ^{x}‍‍‍	18	–	9	.667	36	–	18	.667
Ohio ‍‍‍	16	–	11	.593	29	–	25	.537
Kent State ‍‍‡‍^{y}	16	–	11	.593	32	–	30	.516
Miami ‍‍‍	16	–	12	.571	35	–	25	.583
Marshall ‍‍‍	11	–	17	.393	24	–	29	.453
Akron ‍‍‍	9	–	18	.333	16	–	34	.320
Buffalo ‍‍‍	5	–	23	.179	11	–	39	.220
West
Ball State ^{x}‍‍‍	21	–	5	.808	34	–	23	.596
Central Michigan ‍‍‍	16	–	12	.571	35	–	24	.593
Eastern Michigan ‍‍‍	14	–	12	.538	20	–	33	.377
Western Michigan ‍‍‍	15	–	13	.536	26	–	28	.481
Northern Illinois ‍‍‍	10	–	17	.370	28	–	27	.509
Toledo ‍‍‍	10	–	17	.370	26	–	29	.473
† – Conference champion ‡ – Tournament champion y – Invited to the NCAA tournament As of June 30, 2001; Rankings from Collegiate Baseball

The 2001 Mid-American Conference baseball tournament took place in May 2001. The top six regular season finishers met in the double-elimination tournament held at Ball Diamond on the campus of Ball State University in Muncie, Indiana. This was the thirteenth Mid-American Conference postseason tournament to determine a champion. Fourth seed Kent State won its third tournament championship to earn the conference's automatic bid to the 2001 NCAA Division I baseball tournament.

== Seeding and format ==
The winner of each division claimed the top two seeds, while the next four finishers based on conference winning percentage only, regardless of division, participated in the tournament. The teams played double-elimination tournament. This was the fourth year of the six team tournament.

Team	W	L	PCT	GB	Seed
East Division
Bowling Green	18	9	.667	–	2
Ohio	16	11	.593	2	3
Kent State	16	11	.593	2	4
Miami	16	12	.571	2.5	6
Marshall	11	17	.393	7.5	–
Akron	9	18	.333	9	–
Buffalo	5	23	.179	13.5	–
West Division
Ball State	21	5	.808	–	1
Central Michigan	16	12	.571	6	5
Eastern Michigan	14	12	.538	7	–
Western Michigan	15	13	.536	7	–
Northern Illinois	10	17	.370	11.5	–
Toledo	10	17	.370	11.5	–

== Results ==
First round
1	Ball State	5
6	Miami	13
3	Ohio	10
4	Kent State	26
2	Bowling Green	15
5	Central Michigan	20

Second round
6	Miami	10
3	Ohio	4
4	Kent State	5
5	Central Michigan	1
1	Ball State	8
2	Bowling Green	2

Third round
6	Miami	10
4	Kent State	9
5	Central Michigan	0
1	Ball State	6

Semifinals
4	Kent State	13
1	Ball State	3

Final
6	Miami	8	3
4	Kent State	9	8

== All-Tournament Team ==
The following players were named to the All-Tournament Team.

Name	School
Jason Paul	Ball State
Dustin Sampson	Kent State
Tim Bullinger	Central Michigan
Brady Nori	Miami
Chris Welsch	Kent State
John VanBenschoten	Kent State
Clark Mace	Miami
Scott French	Ball State
Dave Mattle	Kent State
Tom Yost	Miami

=== Most Valuable Player ===
John VanBenschoten won the Tournament Most Valuable Player award. VanBenschoten played for Kent State.
