= 2018 Mid-American Conference baseball tournament =

American collegiate baseball tournament

- Teams: 6
- Format: Double-elimination
- Finals site: Sprenger Stadium; Avon, Ohio
- Champions: Kent State (12th title)
- Winning coach: Jeff Duncan (2nd title)
- MVP: Eli Kraus ((Kent State))
- Television: ESPN+

2018 Mid-American Conference baseball standings
	Conf.						Overall
Team	W		L		T	PCT	W		L		T	PCT
Kent State ‍‍‡‍^{y}	19	–	8	–	0	.704	36	–	16	–	0	.692
Miami (OH) ‍‍‍	17	–	10	–	0	.630	33	–	18	–	0	.647
Ball State ‍‍‍	17	–	10	–	0	.630	31	–	24	–	0	.564
Central Michigan ‍‍‍	16	–	11	–	0	.593	25	–	28	–	1	.472
Eastern Michigan ‍‍‍	14	–	13	–	0	.519	22	–	32	–	0	.407
Toledo ‍‍‍	14	–	13	–	0	.519	21	–	31	–	0	.404
Western Michigan ‍‍‍	12	–	13	–	0	.480	23	–	25	–	0	.479
Ohio ‍‍‍	9	–	18	–	0	.333	21	–	32	–	0	.396
Northern Illinois ‍‍‍	8	–	16	–	0	.333	20	–	35	–	0	.364
Bowling Green ‍‍‍	6	–	19	–	0	.240	11	–	39	–	0	.220
‡ – Tournament champion y – Invited to the NCAA tournament As of May 20, 2018; Rankings from Collegiate Baseball

The 2018 Mid-American Conference baseball tournament was held from May 23 through 27. The top six regular season finishers of the league's ten teams met in the double-elimination tournament held at Sprenger Stadium in Avon, Ohio. Kent State won the tournament to earn the conference's automatic bid to the 2018 NCAA Division I baseball tournament.

== Seeding and format ==
The top six teams were seeded according to conference winning percentage. Teams then played a double-elimination tournament with the top two seeds each receiving a single bye. After the first round, the top seed faced the lowest remaining seed in the winners' bracket. Kent State earned the top seed, while Miami was second, earning the tie over Ball State by taking two of three from the Cardinals during the regular season.

Seed	School	Conference record	Tiebreaker
1	Kent State	19–8	
2	Miami	17–10	2–1 vs. Ball State
3	Ball State	17–10	1–2 vs. Miami
4	Central Michigan	16–11	
5	Toledo	14–13	2–1 vs. Eastern Michigan
6	Eastern Michigan	14–13	1–2 vs. Toledo

== Results ==
Upper round 1	Upper round 2	Upper final	Final
1	Kent State	8
5	Toledo	6	4	Central Michigan	7
4	Central Michigan	7	1	Kent State	7
2	Miami	2
2	Miami	8
6	Eastern Michigan	2	3	Ball State	1
3	Ball State	6
1	Kent State	14	–
2	Miami	0	–
Lower round 1	Lower round 2	Lower round 3	Lower final
2	Miami	9
3	Ball State	2	4	Central Michigan	8
5	Toledo	5	4	Central Michigan	7
5	Toledo	2^{10}	4	Central Michigan	6
6	Eastern Michigan	1
