= 1993 Mid-American Conference baseball tournament =

American collegiate baseball tournament

- Teams: 4
- Format: Double-elimination
- Finals site: Gene Michael Field; Kent, OH
- Champions: Kent State (2nd title)
- Winning coach: Danny Hall (2nd title)
- MVP: Ryan Beeney (Kent State)

1993 Mid-American Conference baseball standings
	Conf.						Overall
Team	W		L		T	PCT	W		L		T	PCT
No. 27 Kent State ‍†‍‡‍^{y}	22	–	10	–	0	.688	41	–	15	–	0	.732
Central Michigan ‍‍‍	22	–	10	–	0	.688	39	–	19	–	0	.672
Western Michigan ‍‍‍	20	–	10	–	0	.667	35	–	21	–	0	.625
Ball State ‍‍‍	17	–	13	–	0	.567	32	–	24	–	0	.571
Ohio ‍‍‍	13	–	15	–	0	.464	21	–	26	–	0	.447
Toledo ‍‍‍	13	–	17	–	0	.433	24	–	31	–	0	.436
Eastern Michigan ‍‍‍	13	–	17	–	0	.433	30	–	24	–	0	.556
Miami ‍‍‍	12	–	18	–	0	.400	26	–	27	–	0	.491
Bowling Green ‍‍‍	11	–	17	–	0	.393	19	–	27	–	1	.415
Akron ‍‍‍	7	–	23	–	0	.233	22	–	33	–	0	.400
† – Conference champion ‡ – Tournament champion y – Invited to the NCAA tournament As of June 30, 1993; Rankings from Collegiate Baseball

The 1993 Mid-American Conference baseball tournament took place in May 1993. The top four regular season finishers met in the double-elimination tournament held at Gene Michael Field on the campus of Kent State University in Kent, Ohio. This was the fifth Mid-American Conference postseason tournament to determine a champion. Top seeded Kent State won their second consecutive and second overall tournament championship to earn the conference's automatic bid to the 1993 NCAA Division I baseball tournament.

== Seeding and format ==
The top four finishers based on conference winning percentage only, participated in the tournament. The teams played double-elimination tournament.

Team	W	L	PCT	GB	Seed
Kent State	22	10	.688	–	1
Central Michigan	22	10	.688	–	2
Western Michigan	20	10	.667	1	3
Ball State	17	13	.567	4	4
Ohio	13	15	.464	7	–
Toledo	13	17	.433	8	–
Eastern Michigan	13	17	.433	8	–
Miami	12	18	.400	9	–
Bowling Green	11	17	.393	9	–
Akron	7	23	.233	14	–

== Results ==
Upper round 1
1	Kent State	0
4	Ball State	1
2	Central Michigan	4
3	Western Michigan	6
Lower round 1
1	Kent State	6
2	Central Michigan	0

Upper final
4	Ball State	5
3	Western Michigan	1
Lower final
3	Western Michigan	4
1	Kent State	5

Final
4	Ball State	1	1
1	Kent State	8	3

== All-Tournament Team ==
The following players were named to the All-Tournament Team.

Name	School
Curt Conley	Ball State
Travis Miller	Kent State
Scott Stricklin	Kent State
Ryan Beeney	Kent State
Sean Freeman	Kent State
Michael Thompson	Ball State
Kevin Zellers	Kent State
Corey Montry	Western Michigan
Matt Terrell	Western Michigan
Todd Stein	Kent State

=== Most Valuable Player ===
Ryan Beeney won the Tournament Most Valuable Player award. Beeney played for Kent State.
