= 2014 Mid-American Conference baseball tournament =

American collegiate baseball tournament

- Teams: 8
- Format: Double-elimination
- Finals site: All Pro Freight Stadium; Avon, OH
- Champions: Kent State (11th title)
- Winning coach: Jeff Duncan (1st title)
- MVP: Cody Koch (Kent State)

2014 Mid-American Conference baseball standings
	Conf.						Overall
Team	W		L		T	PCT	W		L		T	PCT
East Division
Miami (OH) ^{x}‍‍‍	18	–	9	–	0	.667	30	–	27	–	0	.526
Kent State ‍‍‡‍^{y}	16	–	11	–	0	.593	36	–	21	–	0	.632
Bowling Green ‍‍‍	15	–	12	–	0	.556	25	–	27	–	0	.481
Buffalo ‍‍‍	13	–	13	–	0	.500	26	–	26	–	0	.500
Akron ‍‍‍	12	–	15	–	0	.444	28	–	29	–	0	.491
Ohio ‍‍‍	7	–	20	–	0	.259	11	–	40	–	0	.216
West Division
Ball State ^{x}‍‍‍	22	–	4	–	0	.846	39	–	18	–	0	.684
Central Michigan ‍‍‍	19	–	8	–	0	.704	36	–	23	–	0	.610
Western Michigan ‍‍‍	11	–	16	–	0	.407	24	–	31	–	0	.436
Toledo ‍‍‍	11	–	16	–	0	.407	21	–	32	–	0	.396
Northern Illinois ‍‍‍	11	–	16	–	0	.407	17	–	35	–	1	.330
Eastern Michigan ‍‍‍	6	–	21	–	0	.222	19	–	34	–	0	.358
x – Division champion ‡ – Tournament champion y – Invited to the NCAA tournament Rankings from Collegiate Baseball

The 2014 Mid-American Conference baseball tournament was held from May 21 through 24. The top eight regular season finishers of the league's twelve teams, regardless of division, met in the double-elimination tournament held at All Pro Freight Stadium in Avon, Ohio. Kent State won the tournament, earning the conference's automatic bid to the 2014 NCAA Division I baseball tournament.

== Seeding and format ==
Seeding in the eight-team field is determined by conference winning percentage, regardless of division. Teams play a two bracket, double-elimination tournament leading to a single elimination final.

Seeding and format
Division	Team	W	L	Pct	GB	Seed
East	Miami (OH)	18	9	.667	–	3
East	Kent State	16	11	.593	2	4
East	Bowling Green	15	12	.556	3	5
East	Buffalo	13	13	.500	4.5	6
East	Akron	12	15	.444	6	7
East	Ohio	7	20	.259	11	–
West	Ball State	22	4	.846	–	1
West	Central Michigan	19	8	.704	3.5	2
West	Western Michigan	11	16	.407	11.5	8
West	Toledo	11	16	.407	11.5	–
West	Northern Illinois	11	16	.407	11.5	–
West	Eastern Michigan	6	21	.222	15.5	–

== Results ==
First round
1	Ball State	5
8	Western Michigan	3
4	Kent State	6
5	Bowling Green	2
8	Western Michigan	7
5	Bowling Green	4
2	Central Michigan	6
7	Akron	9
3	Miami	5
6	Buffalo	6
2	Central Michigan	3
3	Miami	4

Second round
1	Ball State	3
4	Kent State	4
1	Ball State	1
8	Western Michigan	4
7	Akron	7
6	Buffalo	1
6	Buffalo	4
3	Miami	0

Semifinals
4	Kent State	12	–
8	Western Michigan	2	–
7	Akron	5*	–
6	Buffalo	4	–

Final
4	Kent State	3
7	Akron	0

* - Indicates game required extra innings.

== All-Tournament Team ==
The following players were named to the All-Tournament Team. Kent State's Cody Koch, one of five Golden Flashes selected, was named Most Valuable Player.

Name	Team
Mike Burke	Buffalo
Theo Piccirilli	Western Michigan
Matt LaRocca	Akron
Pat Dyer	Akron
John Valek	Akron
Brian Clark	Kent State
Cody Koch	Kent State
John Fasola	Kent State
Jon Wilson	Kent State
Zarley Zalewski	Kent State
