= 1992 Mid-American Conference baseball tournament =

American collegiate baseball tournament

- Teams: 4
- Format: Double-elimination
- Finals site: Gene Michael Field; Kent, OH
- Champions: Kent State (1st title)
- Winning coach: Danny Hall (1st title)
- MVP: Dustin Hermanson (Kent State)

1992 Mid-American Conference baseball standings
| | Conf. | | | | | | Overall |
| Team | W | | L | | T | PCT | W | | L | | T | PCT |
|---|---|---|---|---|---|---|---|---|---|---|---|---|
| Kent State ‍†‍‡‍^{y} | 24 | – | 7 | – | 0 | .774 | 45 | – | 13 | – | 0 | .776 |
| Ohio ‍‍‍ | 20 | – | 12 | – | 0 | .625 | 33 | – | 22 | – | 0 | .600 |
| Central Michigan ‍‍‍ | 18 | – | 12 | – | 1 | .597 | 31 | – | 27 | – | 1 | .534 |
| Ball State ‍‍‍ | 14 | – | 13 | – | 0 | .519 | 23 | – | 27 | – | 0 | .460 |
| Miami ‍‍‍ | 16 | – | 15 | – | 0 | .516 | 32 | – | 22 | – | 0 | .593 |
| Western Michigan ‍‍‍ | 14 | – | 16 | – | 0 | .467 | 25 | – | 26 | – | 0 | .490 |
| Eastern Michigan ‍‍‍ | 10 | – | 15 | – | 0 | .400 | 22 | – | 26 | – | 0 | .458 |
| Toledo ‍‍‍ | 7 | – | 18 | – | 0 | .280 | 18 | – | 29 | – | 0 | .383 |
| Bowling Green ‍‍‍ | 7 | – | 22 | – | 1 | .250 | 14 | – | 25 | – | 1 | .363 |
† – Conference champion ‡ – Tournament champion y – Invited to the NCAA tournament As of June 30, 1992; Rankings from Collegiate Baseball

The 1992 Mid-American Conference baseball tournament took place in May 1992. The top four regular season finishers met in the double-elimination tournament held at Gene Michael Field on the campus of Kent State University in Kent, Ohio. This was the fourth Mid-American Conference postseason tournament to determine a champion and first since 1983. Top seeded Kent State won their first tournament championship to earn the conference's automatic bid to the 1992 NCAA Division I baseball tournament.

== Seeding and format ==
The top four finishers based on conference winning percentage only, participated in the tournament. The teams played double-elimination tournament.

| Team | W | L | T | PCT | GB | Seed |
|---|---|---|---|---|---|---|
| Kent State | 24 | 7 | 0 | .774 | – | 1 |
| Ohio | 20 | 12 | 0 | .625 | 4.5 | 2 |
| Central Michigan | 18 | 12 | 1 | .597 | 6 | 3 |
| Ball State | 14 | 13 | 0 | .519 | 8 | 4 |
| Miami | 16 | 15 | 0 | .516 | 8 | – |
| Western Michigan | 14 | 16 | 0 | .467 | 9.5 | – |
| Eastern Michigan | 10 | 15 | 0 | .400 | 11 | – |
| Toledo | 7 | 18 | 0 | .280 | 14 | – |
| Bowling Green | 7 | 22 | 0 | .250 | 16 | – |

== Results ==
Upper round 1
1 | Kent State | 2
4 | Ball State | 1
2 | Ohio | 2
3 | Central Michigan | 12
Lower round 1
4 | Ball State | 1
2 | Ohio | 7

Upper final
1 | Kent State | 6
3 | Central Michigan | 7
Lower final
11 | Kent State | 10
2 | Ohio | 4

Final
3 | Central Michigan | 3 | 1
1 | Kent State | 9 | 3

== All-Tournament Team ==
The following players were named to the All-Tournament Team.

| Name | School |
|---|---|
| Dustin Hermanson | Kent State |
| Andy Mayer | Ohio |
| Dan Bergman | Central Michigan |
| Darin Dreasky | Central Michigan |
| Matt Rundels | Kent State |
| Mike Gulan | Kent State |
| Tony Carroll | Central Michigan |
| Todd Stein | Kent State |
| Roger Morgan | Kent State |
| Tony Gucciardo | Kent State |

=== Most Valuable Player ===
Dustin Hermanson won the Tournament Most Valuable Player award. Hermanson was a pitcher for Kent State.
