= 2015 Mid-American Conference baseball tournament =

American collegiate baseball tournament

- Teams: 8
- Format: Double-elimination
- Finals site: All Pro Freight Stadium; Avon, Ohio
- Champions: Ohio (2nd title)

2015 Mid-American Conference baseball standings
	Conf.				Overall
Team	W		L	PCT	W		L	PCT
East Division
Kent State ‍‍‍	13	–	8	.619	26	–	19	.578
Ohio ‍‍‍	12	–	9	.571	27	–	17	.614
Bowling Green ‍‍‍	11	–	10	.524	19	–	24	.442
Akron ‍‍‍	10	–	11	.476	22	–	24	.478
Miami (OH) ‍‍‍	9	–	12	.429	11	–	34	.244
Buffalo ‍‍‍	6	–	15	.286	13	–	28	.317
West Division
Central Michigan ‍‍‍	15	–	6	.714	30	–	17	.638
Toledo ‍‍‍	12	–	9	.571	20	–	28	.417
Ball State ‍‍‍	11	–	10	.524	26	–	19	.578
Western Michigan ‍‍‍	11	–	10	.524	19	–	23	.452
Northern Illinois ‍‍‍	8	–	13	.381	20	–	28	.417
Eastern Michigan ‍‍‍	8	–	13	.381	18	–	29	.383
‡ – Tournament champion As of May 5, 2015; Rankings from Collegiate Baseball

The 2015 Mid-American Conference baseball tournament was held from May 20 through 24. The top eight regular season finishers of the conference's twelve teams, regardless of division, met in the double-elimination tournament held at All Pro Freight Stadium in Avon, Ohio. The Ohio Bobcats won the tournament and earned the conference's automatic bid to the 2015 NCAA Division I baseball tournament.

== Seeding and format ==
The winners of each division claim the top two seeds, with the remaining six spots in the field determined by conference winning percentage, regardless of division. Teams then play a two bracket, double-elimination tournament leading to a single elimination final.

== Results ==
First round
1	Central Michigan	4
8	Akron	5
4	Toledo	2
5	Ball State	3
1	Central Michigan	2
4	Toledo	6
2	Kent State	0
7	Western Michigan	5
3	Ohio	6
6	Bowling Green	2
6	Bowling Green	6
2	Kent State	3

Second round
8	Akron	6
5	Ball State	9
4	Toledo	1
8	Akron	2
7	Western Michigan	1
3	Ohio	4*
6	Bowling Green	5
7	Western Michigan	3

Semifinals
5	Ball State	8	9
8	Akron	9	8
3	Ohio	6	–
6	Bowling Green	0	–

Final
5	Ball State	2
3	Ohio	6
