= Rębielak =

Rębielak, also Rebeliak or Rembeliak is a Polish-language surname. Notable people with this surname include:

- Janusz Rębielak (born 1955), Polish architect and engineer
- Rick Rembielak, American college baseball coach
- Władysław Rębielak (1899–1970), Polish highly decorated military man
