= Jeff Duncan (baseball) =

American baseball player and coach (born 1978)

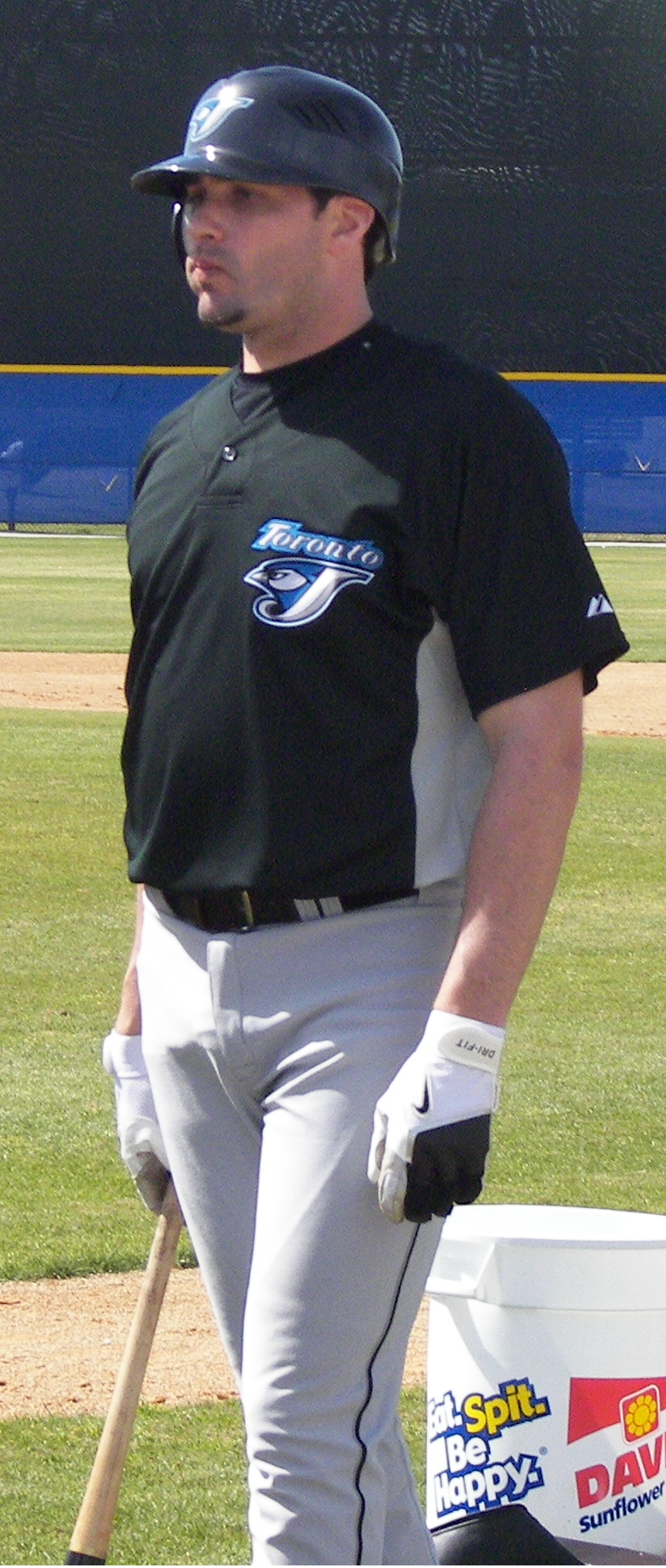
- Duncan with the Toronto Blue Jays in 2007

Kent State Golden Flashes
- Head Coach
- Born: December 9, 1978 (age 47); Harvey, Illinois, U.S.
- Batted: Left Threw: Left

MLB debut
- May 20, 2003, for the New York Mets

Last MLB appearance
- May 5, 2004, for the New York Mets

MLB statistics
- Batting average: .182
- Home runs: 1
- Runs batted in: 15

NCAA statistics (through May 19, 2023)
- Managerial record: 321–194
- Winning %: .623
- Stats at Baseball Reference

Teams
- As player: New York Mets (2003–2004); As coach: Auburn (3B Coach/OF) (2009); Purdue (Recruiting/Hitting/OF) (2010–2013); Kent State (2014–present)

Career highlights and awards
- As Coach: 3× East Division Championships (2015, 2016, 2017); MAC Conference Championships (2016, 2017, 2018, 2023, 2025(tie)); MAC Tournament championships (2014, 2018); NCAA tournaments (2014, 2018); 4× MAC Coach Of The Year (2016, 2017, 2018, 2023); Chuck Tanner College Coach Of The Year (2018)

Jeffrey Matthew Duncan (born December 9, 1978) is an American baseball coach and former Major League Baseball outfielder for the New York Mets. He is the head baseball coach at Kent State University. Duncan played college baseball at Iowa State University in 1998 before transferring to Arizona State University from 1999 to 2000 to play for coach Pat Murphy. After a standout college career, he would be drafted in the 7th round in 2000 by the New York Mets. He then played in the Major Leagues for the New York Mets in 2003 and 2004. Duncan also played in the San Diego Padres, Los Angeles Dodgers, and Toronto Blue-Jays organizations. He hit and threw left-handed.

== Amateur career ==
Duncan graduated from Lemont High School where he played baseball. He was chosen by the Chicago Cubs in the 41st round of the 1997 Major League Baseball draft, but chose to attend Iowa State University instead. A year later, he transferred to Arizona State University. In 1998 Duncan played summer league baseball for the Waterloo Bucks of the Northwoods League. In 1999, he played collegiate summer baseball in the Cape Cod Baseball League for the Yarmouth-Dennis Red Sox, and was named a league all-star.

== Professional career ==
He was drafted by the Mets in the 7th round of the 2000 draft, and agreed to a contract. His professional career started slowly with a batting average of .242 for the short-season A-level Pittsfield Mets in 2000 and only .217 with the A-level Capital City Bombers in 2001. He had few RBI in the two seasons, but registered 61 stolen bases. Duncan's hitting broke through in 2002 with an average close to .400 for two A-level teams leading all Mets Minor Leaguers.

In 2003, Duncan hit well at Double-A Binghamton. Duncan was called up to the majors and made his debut on May 20, 2003. After three games and one start, Duncan was back in Binghamton until mid-July. When he returned to the majors, he collected 12 hits in 11 games and his average stood at .400. This turned out to be the lone good hitting streak of his career. In August 2003, he hit .106 with no RBI and spent a short time with the Triple-A Norfolk Tides. His .200 average in September was punctuated by the only three-hit game of his career.

Duncan was back in the majors with the Mets in 2004, but after only one hit in 15 at bats through May 5, Duncan was back in the minors. He hit under .260 at both the Double-A and Triple-A levels of the Mets' system and was not brought back to the majors. In 2005, he hit only .245 with the Double-A Binghamton Mets and was released on August 11. Duncan was soon signed as a free agent by the San Diego Padres. Although he hit .300 for Double-A Mobile, San Diego did not re-sign him after the season. In 2006, Duncan hit .299 with the Los Angeles Dodgers' Triple-A Las Vegas 51s. He signed a minor league contract with the Toronto Blue Jays on November 10, 2006, but after a strong and impressive spring training he was sent down to AAA Syracuse. After an injury plagued season, he was released on July 3, 2007.

After his release, he signed with the Somerset Patriots of the Atlantic League, but asked for his release on May 21, 2008; he immediately retired.

== Coaching career ==
In September 2009, Duncan left his volunteer position with the Auburn Tigers for a full-time assistant coaching position with the Purdue Boilermakers, which he held through the end of the 2013 season. Prior to the start of the 2014 season, Duncan was hired as the head coach at Kent State.

== Head coaching record ==
Below is a table of Duncan's yearly records as an NCAA head baseball coach.

Record table
Season	Team	Overall	Conference	Standing	Postseason
Kent State Golden Flashes (Mid-American Conference) (2014–present)
2014	Kent State	36–23	16–11	2nd (East)	NCAA Regional
2015	Kent State	31–22	18–9	1st (East)	
2016	Kent State	44–14	20–4	1st	
2017	Kent State	37–18	18–6	1st	
2018	Kent State	40–16	19–8	1st	NCAA Regional
2019	Kent State	30–24	17–8	3rd	
2020	Kent State	7–7	0–0		Season canceled due to COVID-19
2021	Kent State	30–26	23–17	T-3rd	
2022	Kent State	24–29	19–19	5th	
2023	Kent State	42–16	24–6	1st	MAC tournament
2024	Kent State	27–27	16–13	5th	MAC tournament
2025	Kent State	38–18	23–7	T–1st	MAC tournament
2026	Kent State	42–15	24–9	2nd	MAC tournament
Kent State:		428–255 (.627)	237–117 (.669)		
Total:		428–255 (.627)			
National champion Postseason invitational champion Conference regular season champion Conference regular season and conference tournament champion Division regular season champion Division regular season and conference tournament champion Conference tournament champion
