= Rick Rembielak =

American college baseball coach

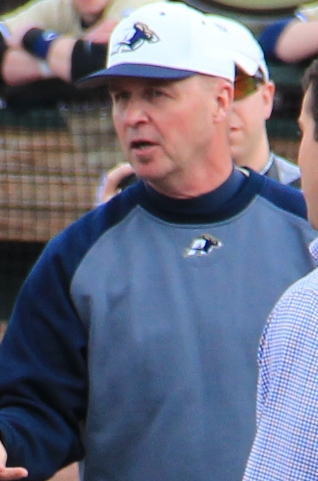
- Rembielak in 2013

Current position
- Title: Head coach
- Team: Massillon (OH) Perry HS

Biographical details
- Born: Cleveland, Ohio, U.S.
- Education: Miami (OH)

Playing career
- 1979–1981: Miami (OH)
- 1981: Bluefield Orioles
- 1982: Miami Marlins
- 1982–1984: Hagerstown Suns
- 1984: Quad Cities Cubs
- 1985: Winston-Salem Spirits
- 1985: Pittsfield Cubs
- Position: Infield

Coaching career (HC unless noted)
- 1988–1993: Kent State (assistant)
- 1994–2004: Kent State
- 2005–2009: Wake Forest
- 2010–2011: Georgia Tech (vol. asst.)
- 2012–2015: Akron
- 2016–present: Massillon (OH) Perry HS

Head coaching record
- Overall: 596–514–1
- Tournaments: 4–9 (NCAA)

Richard A. Rembielak is an American college baseball coach, who most recently served as the head coach of the Akron Zips from the 2012 through the 2015 season. As of the end of the 2014 season, his career head coaching record is 574–490–1.

== Playing career ==
Rembielak played college baseball at Miami (OH) from 1979 to 1981. He was drafted in the 1981 Major League Baseball draft by the Baltimore Orioles and played five seasons of minor league baseball in the Orioles and Chicago Cubs organizations.

== Coaching career ==
He served as the head baseball coach at Kent State of the Mid-American Conference (MAC) from 1994 to 2004, and he had a 373–251–1 (.597) record. This included a 200–100 (.667) record against MAC opponents. He won four regular season MAC championships and three MAC tournament titles. He was named the MAC Coach of the Year in 1996, 2000, and 2003.

Rembielak was the head coach of Wake Forest from 2005 to 2009. In 2007, Rembielak's team finished second in the ACC tournament, losing 1–0 to North Carolina in the championship game. The team earned an at-large berth to the NCAA tournament. At Wake, Rembielak posted a 95–81 record, including a 42–47 record in conference play. Wake Forest replaced Rembielak with Tom Walter.

From 2010–2011, he was a volunteer assistant at Georgia Tech, after being let go by Wake Forest.

Prior to the start of the 2012 season, Rembielak was hired as the head coach at Akron. Following the conclusion of the 2015 season, Akron cancelled the baseball program.

In August 2015, Rembielak was hired to be the head coach at Perry High School in Massillon, Ohio.

As of May 2026, he is currently working as a Maintenance Supervisor at Stow-Munroe Falls High School.

== Head coaching records ==
The following is a list of Rembielak's yearly records as an NCAA Division I head baseball coach.

Record table
Season	Team	Overall	Conference	Standing	Postseason
Kent State Golden Flashes (Mid-American Conference) (1994–2004)
1994	Kent State	33–17	18–7	1st	NCAA Regional
1995	Kent State	40–18	19–10	2nd	MAC Tournament
1996	Kent State	30–21–1	21–7	1st	MAC Tournament
1997	Kent State	29–28	18–13	3rd	MAC Tournament
1998	Kent State	27–28	17–12	2nd (East)	MAC Tournament
1999	Kent State	33–25	19–12	3rd (East)	MAC Tournament
2000	Kent State	40–18	20–6	1st (East)	MAC Tournament
2001	Kent State	32–30	16–11	2nd (East)	NCAA Regional
2002	Kent State	37–22	18–8	2nd (East)	NCAA Regional
2003	Kent State	36–18	20–4	1st (East)	MAC Tournament
2004	Kent State	36–27	14–10	2nd (East)	NCAA Regional
Kent State:		373–252–1	200–100		
Wake Forest Demon Deacons (Atlantic Coast Conference) (2005–2009)
2005	Wake Forest	28–30	12–18	8th	
2006	Wake Forest	33–22	16–13	4th (Atlantic)	
2007	Wake Forest	34–29	14–16	4th (Atlantic)	NCAA Regional
2008	Wake Forest	25–31	13–16	3rd (Atlantic)	
2009	Wake Forest	22–30	6–24	6th (Atlantic)	
Wake Forest:		142–142	61–87		
Akron Zips (Mid-American Conference) (2012–2015)
2012	Akron	17–38	10–17	5th (East)	
2013	Akron	14–39	9–18	5th (East)	
2014	Akron	28–29	12–15	5th (East)	MAC tournament
2015	Akron	22-24	10-11	4th (East)	MAC tournament
Akron:		59–106	41–61		
Total:		596–514–1			
National champion Postseason invitational champion Conference regular season champion Conference regular season and conference tournament champion Division regular season champion Division regular season and conference tournament champion Conference tournament champion
