= Northern Illinois Huskies baseball =

Northern Illinois Huskies
- 2026 Northern Illinois Huskies baseball team
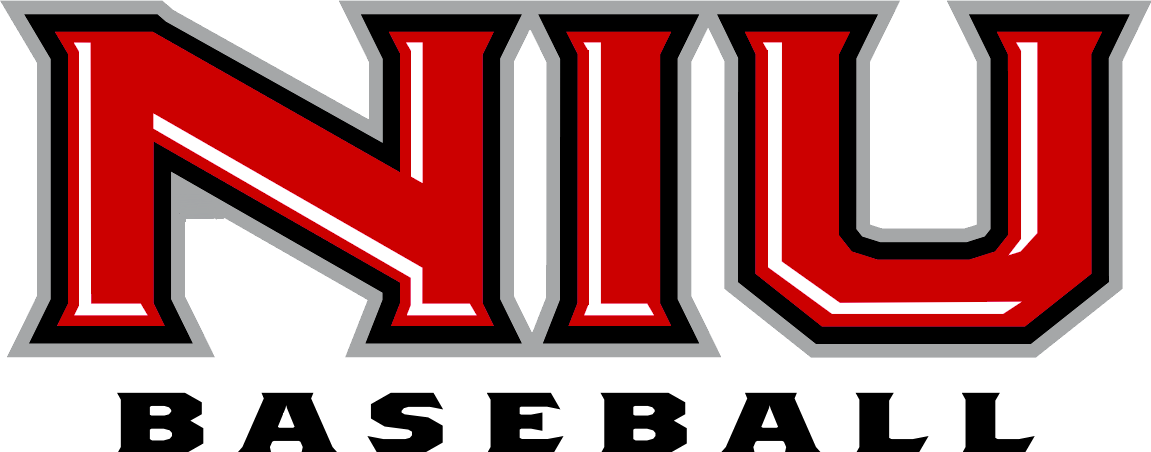
- Founded: 1900
- University: Northern Illinois University
- Head coach: Ryan Copeland (3rd season)
- Conference: Horizon League
- Location: DeKalb, Illinois
- Home stadium: Ralph McKinzie Field (capacity: 1,500)
- Nickname: Huskies
- Colors: Cardinal and black

NCAA tournament appearances
- 1972, 2026

Conference tournament champions
- 1996 (MCC); 2026 (MAC)

Conference regular season champions
- 1924, 1925, 1936, 1945, 1946, 1950, 1951, 1964 (IIAC); 1972 (Midwestern)

The Northern Illinois Huskies baseball team is a varsity intercollegiate athletic team of Northern Illinois University (NIU) in DeKalb, Illinois, United States. The team is a member of the Horizon League, which is part of the NCAA Division I. NIU's first baseball team was fielded in 1900. The team plays its home games at Ralph McKinzie Field in DeKalb, Illinois. The Huskies are currently led by head coach Ryan Copeland, who just finished his third season with the team by winning a 2026 MAC Championship and NCAA post-season game.

== History ==
As of 2021, Northern Illinois and Akron are the only current or former MAC schools not to have a player named the MAC Baseball Player of the Year or MAC Baseball Pitcher of the Year since those awards were first given in 1986 and 1988 respectively.

NIU reached the NCAA tournament for the first time since 1972 by winning the 2026 Mid-American Conference baseball tournament in their final season as a member of the MAC. They previously had a chance in 1996 as MCC champion but lost a play-in series to Northeastern Illinois.

NIU recorded their first ever NCAA Tournament win in the 2026 NCAA Division 1 Baseball Tournament by defeating Coastal Carolina 12-10 in the first round of the Tallahasse Regional.

=== Conference membership ===
- 1900–22: Independent
- 1923–66: Illinois Intercollegiate Athletic Conference
- 1967: Independent
- 1968–70: NCAA Division I Independent
- 1971–73: Midwestern Conference
- 1974–82: Mid-American Conference
- 1983-91: NCAA Division I Independent
- 1992–94: Mid-Continent Conference
- 1995–97: Midwestern Collegiate Conference
- 1998 to present: Mid-American Conference (West Division)

== NCAA Tournament ==
Northern Illinois has participated in the NCAA Division I baseball tournament twice.

| Year | Round | Opponent | Result |
|---|---|---|---|
| 1972 | Quarterfinals; Lower Round 1 | Bowling Green; Iowa | L 0–2; L 1–8 |
| 2026 | Tallahassee Regional | Coastal Carolina; St. Johns; Florida State | W 12–10; L 8–21; L 4–7 (10) |

== Year-by-year results ==
Record table
| Season | Coach | Overall | Conference | Standing | Postseason |
|---|---|---|---|---|---|
| 1900 | Fred Charles | 3–3 | | | |
| 1901 | Fred Charles | 3–5–1 | | | |
| 1902 | Fred Charles | 2–2 | | | |
| 1903 | A.F. Johnson | 4–0 | | | |
| 1904 | Henry Stiness | 7–4 | | | |
| 1905 | A.C. Kinsbury | 5–1 | | | |
| 1907 | Nelson A. Kellogg | 4–5 | | | |
| 1908 | Nelson A. Kellogg | 5–6 | | | |
| 1909 | Nelson A. Kellogg | 7–4 | | | |
| 1910 | Nelson A. Kellogg | 10–2 | | | |
| 1912 | William Wirtz | 5–3 | | | |
| 1913 | William Wirtz | 3–4–1 | | | |
| 1914 | William Wirtz | 5–4 | | | |
| 1915 | William Wirtz | 3–2 | | | |
| 1916 | William Wirtz | 8–1 | | | |
| 1917 | William Wirtz | 5–1 | | | |
| 1920 | Robert G. Buzzard | 10–3 | | | |
| 1921 | Paul Harrison | 3–3–1 | | | |
| 1922 | Paul Harrison | 4–7 | | | |
| 1923 | Paul Harrison | 4–3 | | | |
| 1924 | William Muir | 7–3 | N/A | 1st | |
| 1925 | William Muir | 11–0 | N/A | 1st | |
| 1926 | William Muir | 6–3 | | | |
| 1927 | Roland Cowell | 2–3 | | | |
| 1928 | Roland Cowell | 7–2 | | | |
| 1929 | Roland Cowell | 3–3 | | | |
| 1930 | Chick Evans | 5–7 | | | |
| 1931 | Chick Evans | 3–5 | | | |
| 1932 | Chick Evans | 3–4 | | | |
| 1933 | Chick Evans | 7–4–1 | | | |
| 1934 | Chick Evans | 6–4 | | | |
| 1935 | C. Nordly | 8–1 | | | |
| 1936 | Chick Evans | 5–6 | N/A | 1st | |
| 1937 | Chick Evans | 17–8 | | | |
| 1938 | Chick Evans | 10–12 | | | |
| 1939 | Chick Evans | 10–14 | | | |
| 1940 | Chick Evans | 14–12 | | | |
| 1941 | Chick Evans | 4–14 | | | |
| 1942 | Chick Evans | 8–9 | | | |
| 1943 | Chick Evans | 5–9 | | | |
| 1944 | Chick Evans | 1–9 | | | |
| 1945 | Ralph McKinzie | 8–1 | N/A | 1st | |
| 1946 | Chick Evans | 15–3 | 7–0 | 1st | |
| 1947 | Chick Evans | 13–5–2 | N/A | | |
| 1948 | John Pace | 11–11 | 4–3 | 3rd | |
| 1949 | Ralph McKinzie | 10–6 | 3–4 | | |
| 1950 | Ralph McKinzie | 16–8 | N/A | 1st | |
| 1951 | Ralph McKinzie | 11–6 | N/A | 1st | |
| 1952 | Ralph McKinzie | 5–12 | 3–7 | 4th | |
| 1953 | Ralph McKinzie | 6–12 | 2–6 | 5th | |
| 1954 | Ralph McKinzie | 5–15 | 4–8 | | |
| 1955 | Ralph McKinzie | 5–17 | 2–8 | | |
| 1956 | Ralph McKinzie | 4–13 | 3–9 | 6th | |
| 1957 | Darrel Black | 7–10–1 | 5–5 | 4th | |
| 1958 | Darrel Black | 8–18–1 | 7–10 | | |
| 1959 | Darrel Black | 13–14 | 9–8 | | |
| 1960 | Darrel Black | 12–15 | 5–6 | 6th | |
| 1961 | Darrel Black | 20–13–1 | 7–8 | 4th | |
| 1962 | Darrel Black | 13–21 | 5–7 | 4th | |
| 1963 | Darrel Black | 17–17 | 6–6 | 4th | |
| 1964 | Thomas L. Meyer | 23–5 | 10–2 | 1st | |
| 1965 | Thomas L. Meyer | 15–17–1 | 6–6 | 2nd | |
| 1966 | Thomas L. Meyer | 13–6–1 | 6–2 | 2nd | |
| 1967 | Thomas L. Meyer | 20–14–1 | | | |
| 1968 | Thomas L. Meyer | 13–14–1 | | | |
| 1969 | Thomas L. Meyer | 16–19 | | | |
Dave Mason (1970–1971)
| 1970 | Dave Mason | 18–15–1 | | | |
| 1971 | Dave Mason | 24–15 | 5–6 | | |
Wayne Franke (1972–1972)
| 1972 | Wayne Frank | 24–6 | 7–2 | 1st | |
Dave Mason (1973–1975)
| 1973 | Dave Mason | 14–15 | | | |
| 1974 | Dave Mason | 18–21 | 7–7 | 6th | |
| 1975 | Dave Mason | 20–17 | 8–8 | 6th | |
Walt Owens (1976–1982)
| 1976 | Walt Owens | 15–22 | 19–26 | 10th | |
| 1977 | Walt Owens | 26–13–2 | 4–10 | 4th | |
| 1978 | Walt Owens | 14–27 | 2–11 | 10th | |
| 1979 | Walt Owens | 2–13–1 | 19–26 | 9th | |
| 1980 | Walt Owens | 19–20–2 | 6–10 | 7th | |
| 1981 | Walt Owens | 19–26–2 | 6–10 | 6th | |
| 1982 | Walt Owens | 19–24–1 | 4–9 | 4th (West) | |
Spanky McFarland (1991–1997)
| 1991 | Spanky McFarland | 11–25 | | | |
| 1992 | Spanky McFarland | 18–36 | | | |
| 1993 | Spanky McFarland | 15–35–1 | | | |
| 1994 | Spanky McFarland | 23–30 | | | |
| 1995 | Spanky McFarland | 29–27 | | | |
| 1996 | Spanky McFarland | 27–30 | 12-10 | 4th | |
| 1997 | Spanky McFarland | 19–29 | | | |
Frank Del Medico (1998–1999)
| 1998 | Frank Del Medico | 10–39–1 | | | |
| 1999 | Frank Del Medico | 4–51–1 | | | |
Dave Schrage (2000–2002)
| 2000 | Dave Schrage | 24–33 | 11–15 | 6th (West) | |
| 2001 | Dave Schrage | 28–27 | 10–17 | 5th (West) | |
| 2002 | Dave Schrage | 23–32 | 11–14 | 5th (West) | |
Ed Mathey (2003–2014)
| 2003 | Ed Mathey | 34–24 | 15–11 | 3rd (West) | |
| 2004 | Ed Mathey | 31–28 | 14–10 | 2nd (West) | |
| 2005 | Ed Mathey | 16–36 | 8–16 | 6th (West) | |
| 2006 | Ed Mathey | 24–31 | 8–18 | 6th (West) | |
| 2007 | Ed Mathey | 34–24 | 16–11 | 3rd (West) | |
| 2008 | Ed Mathey | 28–26 | 16–10 | 2nd (West) | |
| 2009 | Ed Mathey | 19–34 | 10–16 | | |
| 2010 | Ed Mathey | 24–31 | 12–15 | 5th (West) | |
| 2011 | Ed Mathey | 30–27 | 16–11 | | |
| 2012 | Ed Mathey | 15–40 | 7–20 | | |
| 2013 | Ed Mathey | 22–34 | 16–11 | 1st (West) | |
| 2014 | Ed Mathey | 17–36–1 | 11–16 | 5th (West) | |
Mike Kunigonis (2015–2023)
| 2015 | Mike Kunigonis | 22–33 | 10–17 | 5th (West) | |
| 2016 | Mike Kunigonis | 24–32 | 14–10 | 2nd (West) | |
| 2017 | Mike Kunigonis | 17–38 | 11–13 | 5th (West) | |
| 2018 | Mike Kunigonis | 20–36 | 9–18 | 10th | |
| 2019 | Mike Kunigonis | 20–36 | 14–12 | 5th | |
| 2020 | Mike Kunigonis | 7–10 | 0–0 | | Season canceled due to COVID-19 |
| 2021 | Mike Kunigonis | 16–38 | 15–25 | T-9th | |
| 2022 | Mike Kunigonis | 14–40 | 13–25 | 10th | |
| 2023 | Mike Kunigonis | 10–43 | 5–24 | 11th | |
Ryan Copeland (2024–present)
| 2024 | Ryan Copeland | 21-33 | 14-16 | 7th | |
| 2025 | Ryan Copeland | 21-33 | 9-21 | 9th | |
| 2026 | Ryan Copeland | 36-20 | 21-13 | 4th | |
| Total: | | 1793-2224-37 | | | |
National champion Postseason invitational champion Conference regular season champion Conference regular season and conference tournament champion Division regular season champion Division regular season and conference tournament champion Conference tournament champion

== See also ==
- List of NCAA Division I baseball programs
