= Ball State Cardinals baseball =

- 2026 Ball State Cardinals baseball team
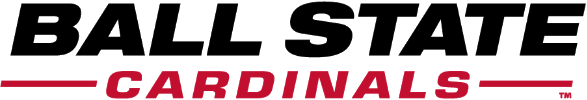
- Founded: 1920; 106 years ago
- University: Ball State University
- Head coach: Rich Maloney (21st overall season)
- Conference: Mid–American
- Location: Muncie, Indiana
- Home stadium: Shebek Stadium, formerly Ball Diamond (capacity: 1,500)
- Nickname: Cardinals
- Colors: Cardinal and white

NCAA tournament appearances
- 1965, 1969, 2006, 2023

Conference tournament champions
- 2006, 2023

Conference regular season champions
- 1998, 1999, 2001, 2014, 2022

Conference division regular season champions
- 1998, 1999, 2000, 2001, 2003, 2005, 2009, 2014, 2016 (divisions ended after 2017 season)

The Ball State Cardinals represent Ball State University in Muncie, Indiana, as a varsity intercollegiate athletic team. The program competes in the Mid-American Conference (MAC) as a member of NCAA Division I. Since fielding its first team in 1920, Ball State has established a rich baseball tradition, currently led by head coach Rich Maloney. The Cardinals play their home games at Shebek Stadium (formerly known as Ball Diamond) in Muncie.

== Ball State in the NCAA Tournament ==
Year	Record	Pct	Notes
1965	0–2	.000	District 4
1969	2–2	.500	District 4
2006	1–2	.333	Lexington Regional
2023	0–2	.000	Lexington Regional
TOTALS	3-8	.273	

== First-round MLB draft picks ==
Ball State holds the record for the most first-round MLB draft picks in Mid-American Conference (MAC) history with eight selections. The program's most historic milestone came in 2002 when Bryan Bullington was selected No. 1 overall by the Pittsburgh Pirates—marking the first time in MAC history that an athlete in any sport was taken with the top overall pick.

Pick	Player	Team	Position	Year
11	Thomas Howard	San Diego Padres	OF	1986
41	Jeff Urban	San Francisco Giants	LHP	1998
21	Larry Bigbie	Baltimore Orioles	OF	1999
1	Bryan Bullington	Pittsburgh Pirates	RHP	2002
32	Luke Hagerty	Chicago Cubs	LHP	2002
18	Brad Snyder	Cleveland Indians	OF	2003
20	Kolbrin Vitek	Boston Redsox	RHP/2B	2010
34	Drey Jameson	Arizona Diamondbacks	RHP	2019

== Players to reach the Major Leagues ==
Ball State Baseball has produced 17 Major Leaguers throughout its history.

- Merv Rettenmund
- Mike Roesler
- Thomas Howard (baseball)
- Larry Bigbie
- Sam McConnell
- Bryan Bullington
- Brad Snyder
- Dean Anna
- Jeremy Hazelbaker
- Perci Garner
- Zach Plesac
- Alex Call
- Drey Jameson
- Kyle Nicolas
- CJ Alexander
- Chayce McDermott
- Zach Cole

== MAC awards ==
Ball State: A Legacy of Excellence Ball State has established itself as the premier program for individual player development in the Mid-American Conference. The Cardinals hold the conference record for the most MAC Player of the Year selections (8).

Here is the list of all the MAC Player of the Year awards won by Ball State:

MAC Player of the Year
Name	Year
Thomas Howard	1986
Ed Farris	1996
Larry Bigbie	1999
Shayne Ridley	2000
Brad Snyder	2003
Kolbrin Vitek	2010
Sean Godfrey	2014
Alex Call	2016

MAC Freshman of the Year
Larry Bigbie	1997
Justin Wechsler	1999
Bryan Bullington	2000
Ben Snyder	2005
Jarett Ridfleisch	2014
Drey Jameson	2018
Ryan Brown	2022
Keegan Johnson	2024

MAC Pitcher of the Year
Name	Year
Bryan Bullington	2001, 2002
Erik Morrison	2005
Scott Baker	2013
Drey Jameson	2019
Tyler Schweitzer	2022
Merritt Beeker	2024

MAC Coach of the Year
Name	Year
Rich Maloney	1998, 2001, 2014, 2022

MAC Defensive Player of Year
Name	Year
Chase Sebby	2019, 2021
Ryan Peltier	2022
Michael Hallquist	2024

== Head coaching history ==
Ball State has employed 17 head coaches since the program began in 1920. Rich Maloney is the program's all-time leader in both wins and tenure, having served two separate stints (1996–2002 and 2013–present). During his 2025 campaign, Maloney reached the milestone of 1,000 career NCAA victories. Other notable long-term coaches include Ray Louthen and Bob Briner, who each led the program for 12 seasons.

Year(s)	Coach	Seasons	Wins	Losses	Ties	Pct.
1920–1921	Orville Sink	2	7	5	0	.583
1922–1926; 1928–1943; 1945–1958	Paul Williams	35	32	24	1	.570
1927	Norman Wann	1	3	6	0	.333
1959–1970	Ray Louthen	12	158	127	1	.554
1971–1982	Bob Rickel	12	201	226	3	.471
1983–1995	Pat Quinn	13	323	415	9	.438
2003–2010	Greg Beals	8	243	202	0	.546
2011–2012	Alex Marconi	2	29	71	0	.290
1996–2002, 2013–present	Rich Maloney	20	683	424	2	.617
Totals	9 Coaches	105	1,679	1,500	16	.527

Rank	Name	Seasons
1	Paul Williams	35
2	Rich Maloney	20
3	Pat Quinn	13

Rank	Name	Wins
1	Rich Maloney	683
2	Pat Quinn	323
3	Greg Beals	243

Rank	Name	Pct.
1	Rich Maloney	.617
2	Orville Sink	.583
3	Paul Williams	.570

== See also ==
- List of NCAA Division I baseball programs
