= Bowling Green Falcons baseball =

American college baseball team in Ohio

- 2026 Bowling Green Falcons baseball team
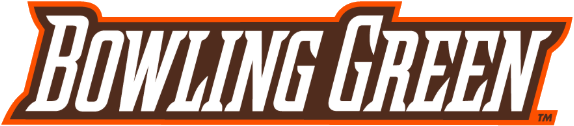
- Founded: 1915; 111 years ago
- University: Bowling Green State University
- Head coach: Kyle Hallock (6th season)
- Conference: Mid–American
- Location: Bowling Green, Ohio
- Home stadium: Steller Field (capacity: 2,500)
- Nickname: Falcons
- Colors: Brown and orange

NCAA tournament appearances
- 1972, 1998, 1999, 2013

Conference tournament champions
- 1998, 1999, 2013

Conference regular season champions
- NWOIAA; 1921, 1922, 1925, 1926, 1928, 1931, 1932; MAC; 1972, 1995, 2002, 2008, 2009, 2024

The Bowling Green Falcons baseball team is a varsity athletic program at Bowling Green State University in Bowling Green, Ohio, The team plays in the National Collegiate Athletic Association (NCAA) at the Division I level as a member of the Mid-American Conference. The Falcons have played in three NCAA Tournaments, going in 1972, 1999, and 2013. The program has 13 regular-season conference championships (7 NWOIAA, 6 MAC), six East Division championships, and three conference tournament championships. The most recent regular-season championship came in 2024. The 1921 team was the first athletic team at the school to win a title, when they finished 6–1–2 in the Northwest Ohio League.

== History ==
=== Early years ===
The first baseball team at Bowling Green Normal College was established in 1915 under the guide of head coach F.G. Beyerman and finished their inaugural campaign at 1–3. The program would not reach varsity level until 1918, playing their first game on May 3, 1918 defeating Defiance College 4–3 in 7 innings. The Normals would finish the 1918 season 2–1 defeating Bluffton College 6–5 and losing a rematch with Defiance 13–3.

Bowling Green joined the Northwest Ohio League in 1921 and finished the season 6–1–2, good enough to make the Normals NWOIAA champions in their first year in the conference. The 1921 Normals baseball team would be the first athletic program at Bowling Green to win a title of any sort.

In May 1944 the baseball team won 1–0 against the Camp Perry team, where Italian prisoners of war watched the game.

Bowling Green would win six more NWOIAA titles (1922, 1925–26, 1928, 1931–32), before deciding to leave the conference and become an independent.

=== Move to the MAC ===
In 1953, Bowling Green would become a member of the Mid-American Conference, following rival and former NWOIAA conference mate Toledo who joined in 1951. In their first season in the MAC, the Falcons would go 8–6 including a 4–4 conference record which would place them 3rd in the conference. Bowling Green would not win their first MAC crown until 1972 when they posted a 24–12–2 record (6–2–1 MAC) and were invited to the NCAA District IV Tournament. The Falcons would defeat Northern Illinois 2–0 and Central Michigan 7–5 in 10 innings, but fell just short of a birth to the College World Series as they lost 7–2 and 7–5 to Iowa.

Since moving to the MAC, Bowling Green has won six more regular season championships (1995, 1998–99, 2001–02, 2008) and two conference tournament championships (1998–99). The Falcons were the MAC's representative in the 1999 NCAA Division I baseball tournament and were selected to compete as the 4th seed in the Columbus Regional, hosted by Ohio State. The Falcons would go 0–2, losing to 1st seed Ohio State 4–1 and then lost in the loser's bracket 10–5 to the 2nd seed Nebraska.

=== Danny Schmitz era ===
Danny Schmitz replaced Ed Platzer as head coach of the Bowling Green Falcons in 1991. In Schmitz's first season as head coach, the Falcons posted a 16–39–1 (7–23) record and finished 9th in the MAC. Schmitz would turn the program around in his fourth season (1994) posting a 29–18 (16–10) record, finishing 3rd in the MAC. He would lead the Falcons to their second MAC crown the following year posting a 34–20 (22–8) record.

Under Schmitz' watch, the Falcons won four regular-season conference championships, seven East Division titles, three conference tournament championships, and an NCAA Tournament appearance. Schmitz is second longest tenured coach in the program's history, only behind Warren E. Steller (32 seasons) and is the programs all-time winningest manager with 723 wins. Schmitz became the program's all-time winningest coach on March 26, 2000 after the Falcons defeated Buffalo 3–2.

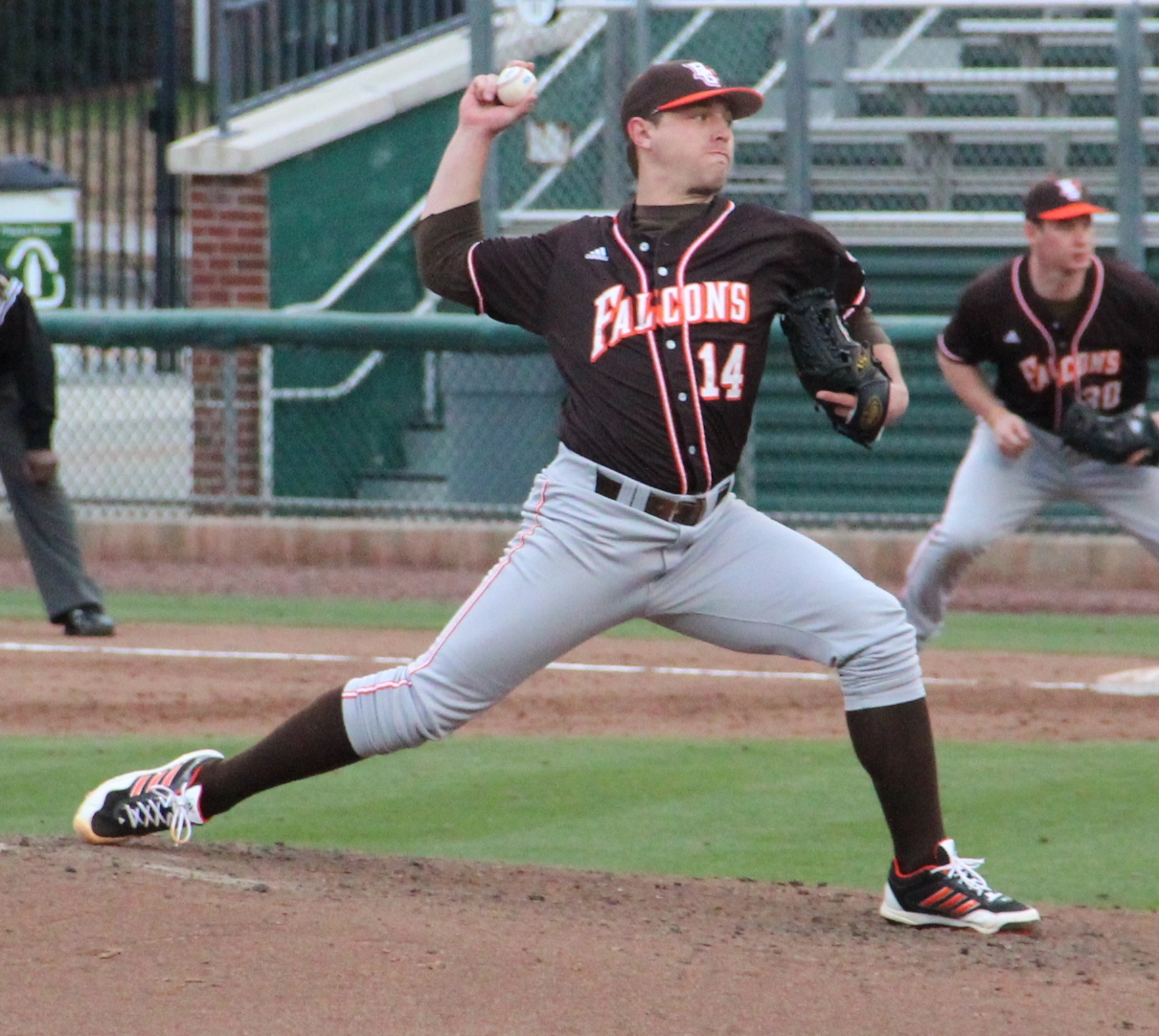
A Bowling Green pitcher at Russ Chandler Stadium in 2014

After 105 years, the sport was dropped at the varsity level effective immediately on May 15, 2020 as part of the budget cuts due to the on-going coronavirus pandemic. Just weeks later, the school announced it was reinstating baseball after they fund-raised $1.5 million dollars of commitments over the next three years. On June 3, 2020, it was announced that Schmitz would step down from head coach and step into an advisory role with the program.

== Bowling Green in the NCAA tournament ==
Year	Record	Pct	Notes
1972	2–2	.500	Hosted District 4 Regional
1998	0–2	.000	Atlantic I Regional
1999	0–2	.000	Columbus Regional
2013	0–2	.000	Louisville Regional
TOTALS	2–8	.200	

== Steller Field ==
Steller Field has been home to the Falcons baseball team since 1964. The field is named in honor of Warren E. Steller, a former instructor at the school who coached the school's football (1924–34) and baseball (1925, 1928–59) teams. The stadium is located on the Bowling Green campus, next to Slater Family Ice Arena and across the street from the Perry Field House.

== Head coaches ==
Updated through the end of the 2025 season:

Tenure	Coach	Years	Record	Pct.
1915–1921^{1}	F. G. Beyerman	5	12–14–2	.464
1922	Earl Krieger	1	7–2	.778
1923	Allen W. Snyder	1	5–3	.625
1924	Ray B. McCandless	1	2–3–2	.429
1925, 1928–1959^{2}	Warren Steller	32	222–153	.592
1926–1927	Paul Landis	2	13–11	.542
1960–1971	Dick Young	12	184–147–6	.555
1972–1982	Don Purvis	11	305–219–6	.581
1983–1990	Ed Platzer	8	202–217–6	.482
1991–2020	Danny Schmitz	30	723–791–5	.478
2021–present	Kyle Hallock	5	124–136	.477
Totals	11 coaches	110 seasons	1,799–1,696–27	.515

^{1} – Records for 1916 and 1917 are unknown
^{2} – Bowling Green did not field teams in 1935 and 1937 due to lack of funds and a playing site

**Longest Tenure**
Rank	Name	Seasons
1	Warren E. Steller	32
2	Danny Schmitz	30
3	Dick Young	12

**Most Wins**
Rank	Name	Wins
1	Danny Schmitz	723
2	Don Purvis	305
3	Warren E. Steller	222

**Best Winning Pct.**
Rank	Name	Pct.
1	E.C. Kreiger	.778
2	Allen W. Snyder	.625
3	Warren E. Steller	.592

=== Bowling Green's all-time players in MLB ===
- Barney Mussill, P — 1944 Philadelphia Phillies
- Roy Lee, P — 1945 New York Giants
- Johnny Antonelli, P — 1948–1950, 1953, 1961 Boston/Milwaukee Braves, 1954–1960 New York/San Francisco Giants, 1961 Cleveland Indians
- Grant Jackson, P — 1965–1970 Philadelphia Phillies, 1971–1976 Baltimore Orioles, 1976 New York Yankees, 1977–1981, 1982 Pittsburgh Pirates, 1981 Montreal Expos, 1982 Kansas City Royals
- John Knox, 2B — 1972–1975 Detroit Tigers
- Danny Godby, OF — 1974 St. Louis Cardinals
- Doug Bair, P — 1976, 1989–1990 Pittsburgh Pirates, 1977, 1986 Oakland Athletics, 1978–1981 Cincinnati Reds, 1981–1983, 1985 St. Louis Cardinals, 1984–1985 Detroit Tigers, 1987 Philadelphia Phillies, 1988 Toronto Blue Jays
- Kip Young, P — 1978–1979 Detroit Tigers
- Jeff Jones, P — 1980–1984 Oakland Athletics
- Larry Owen, C — 1981–1983, 1985 Atlanta Braves. 1987–1988 Kansas City Royals
- Orel Hershiser, P — 1983–1994, 2000 Los Angeles Dodgers, 1995–1997 Cleveland Indians, 1998 San Francisco Giants, 1999 New York Mets
- Roger McDowell, P — 1985–1989 New York Mets, 1989–1991 Philadelphia Phillies, 1991–1994 Los Angeles Dodgers, 1995 Texas Rangers, 1996 Baltimore Orioles
- Larry Arndt, 1B/3B — 1989 Oakland Athletics
- Scott Taylor, P — 1992–1993 Boston Red Sox
- Brian Koelling, INF — 1993 Cincinnati Reds
- Andy Tracy, 1B — 2000–2001 Montreal Expos, 2004 Colorado Rockies, 2008–2009 Philadelphia Phillies
- Burke Badenhop, P — 2008–2011 Florida Marlins, 2012Tampa Bay Rays, 2013 Milwaukee Brewers, 2014 Boston Red Sox, 2015 Cincinnati Reds
- Nolan Reimold, OF — 2009–2013, 2015–2016 Baltimore Orioles, 2014 Toronto Blue Jays, Arizona Diamondbacks
- Jon Berti, INF — 2018 Toronto Blue Jays, 2019–2023 Miami Marlins, 2024 New York Yankees, Chicago Cubs

Names in bold denote current MLB players.

== Awards ==
- Johnny Antonelli — 6× All-Star, (1954, 1956–1959²), World Series champion (1954), NL ERA leader (1954)
- Grant Jackson — All-Star (1969), World Series champion (1979)
- Doug Bair — 2× World Series champion (1982, 1984)
- Orel Hershiser — 3× All-Star, (1987–1989), World Series champion (1988), NL Cy Young Award (1988), World Series MVP (1988), 2× LCS MVP (1988, 1995), Gold Glove Award (1988), Silver Slugger Award (1993), NL wins leader (1988), MLB record 59 consecutive scoreless innings pitched
- Roger McDowell — World Series champion (1986)
- John Berti — MLB stolen base leader (2022)
