= Ohio Bobcats baseball =

- 2026 Ohio Bobcats baseball team
- Founded: 1892; 134 years ago
- University: Ohio University
- Head coach: Andrew See (1st season)
- Conference: Mid–American
- Location: Athens, Ohio
- Home stadium: Bob Wren Stadium (Capacity: 4,000)
- Nickname: Bobcats
- Colors: Hunter green and white

College World Series appearances
- 1970

NCAA tournament appearances
- 1947, 1948, 1953, 1954, 1956, 1959, 1960, 1964, 1965, 1968, 1969, 1970, 1971, 1997, 2015, 2017

Conference tournament champions
- 1997, 2015, 2017

Conference regular season champions
- 1947, 1948, 1953, 1954, 1956, 1959, 1960, 1964, 1965, 1968, 1969, 1970, 1971, 1991, 1997

The Ohio Bobcats baseball team is a varsity intercollegiate athletic team of Ohio University in Athens, Ohio, United States. The team is a member of the Mid-American Conference East division, which is part of the National Collegiate Athletic Association's Division I. Ohio's first baseball team was fielded in 1892. The team plays its home games at Bob Wren Stadium in Athens, Ohio. The Bobcats are coached by Andrew See.

== Ohio in the NCAA tournament ==
Year	Record	Pct	Notes
1954	3–2	.600	Hosted District 4 Regional
1956	1–2	.333	Hosted District 4 Regional
1960	1–2	.333	District 4 Regional
1965	1–2	.333	District 4 Regional
1968	2–2	.500	District 4 Regional
1970	5–2	.714	College World Series 3rd Place, District 4 Champions
1971	1–2	.333	District 4 Regional
1997	0–2	.000	Midwest Regional
2015	0–2	.000	Champaign Regional
2017	0–2	.000	Lexington Regional
TOTALS	14-20	.412	

== Notable former players ==
- Bob Brenly† — manager, Arizona Diamondbacks, 2001–2004; 2001 World Series champion
- Ernie Kish† — outfielder, 1945 Philadelphia Athletics
- Rich McKinney — infielder, Chicago White Sox first-round draft pick (1968)
- Mike Schmidt† — third baseman, Philadelphia Phillies, 1972–1989; 1980 World Series champion; elected to the Baseball Hall of Fame in 1995
- Steve Swisher† — catcher, Chicago White Sox first-round draft pick (1973)
- Jeremie Rehak — umpire, Major League Baseball active (first appearance 2018)
- Mickey Briglia — head coach, Rowan University (Glassboro State at the time) from 1964 to 1988; 2x NCAA Division III World Series Champ (1978, 1979); played third base, All Mid-American Conference 1949-1951

† inductee of the Kermit Blosser Ohio Athletics Hall of Fame

== See also ==
- List of NCAA Division I baseball programs
