= Eastern Michigan Eagles baseball =

Eastern Michigan Eagles
- 2026 Eastern Michigan Eagles baseball team
- Founded: 1901; 125 years ago
- University: Eastern Michigan University
- Head coach: Trevor Beerman (1st season)
- Conference: Mid–American
- Location: Ypsilanti, Michigan
- Home stadium: Oestrike Stadium (capacity: 2,500)
- Nickname: Eagles
- Colors: Green and white

College World Series runner-up
- 1976

College World Series appearances
- 1975, 1976

NCAA regional champions
- 1975, 1976

NCAA tournament appearances
- 1975, 1976, 1981, 1982, 2003, 2008

Conference tournament champions
- 1981, 1982, 2003, 2008

The Eastern Michigan Eagles baseball team (formerly the Eastern Michigan Hurons) is a varsity intercollegiate athletic team of Eastern Michigan University in Ypsilanti, Michigan, United States. The team is a member of the Mid-American Conference West division, which is part of the National Collegiate Athletic Association's Division I. Eastern Michigan's first baseball team was fielded in 1901. The team plays its home games at Oestrike Stadium in Ypsilanti, Michigan. The 1976 team finished as runner-up at the 1976 College World Series, making the then-Hurons the last northern school to play for a CWS title until Michigan in 2019.

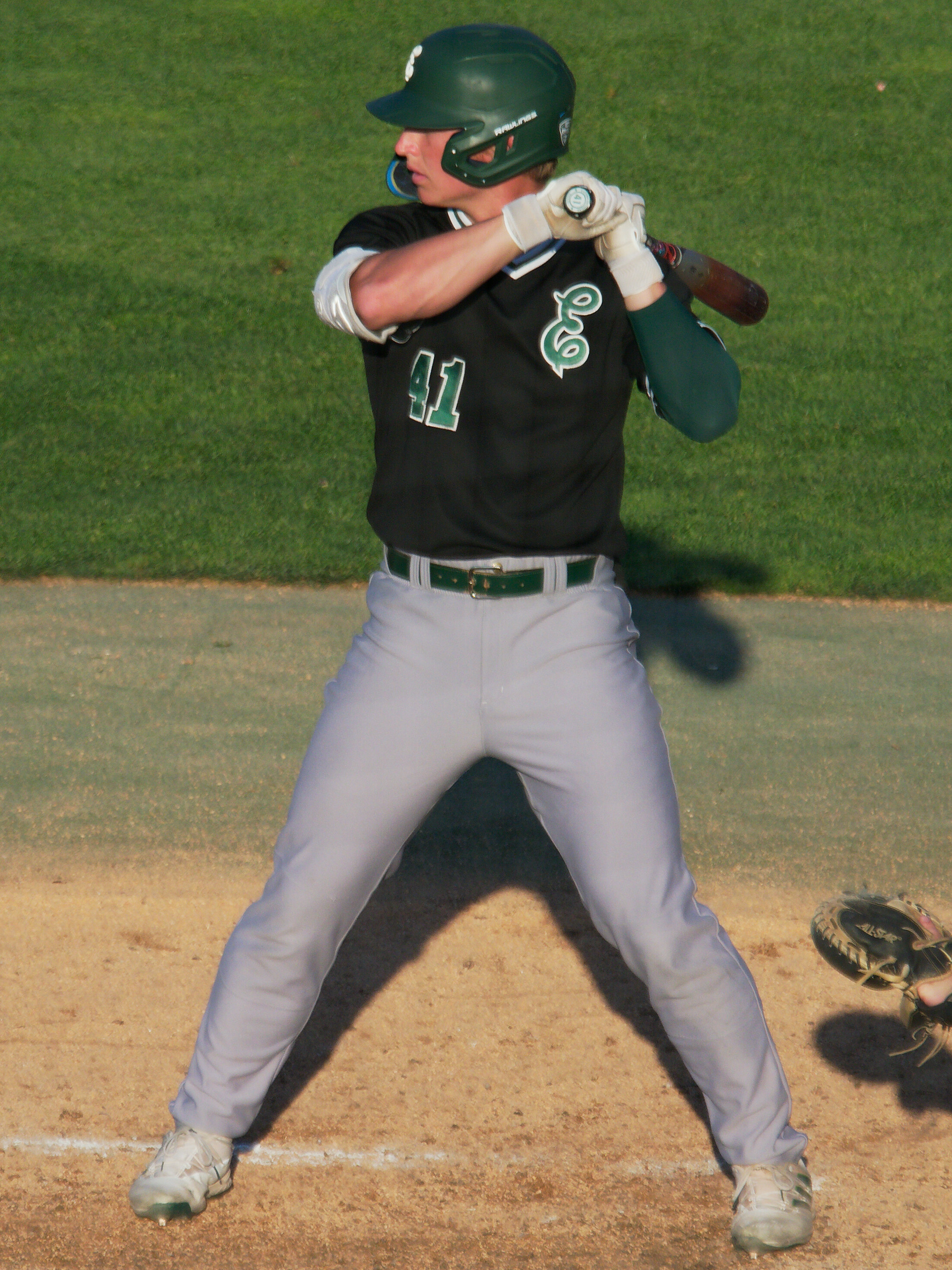
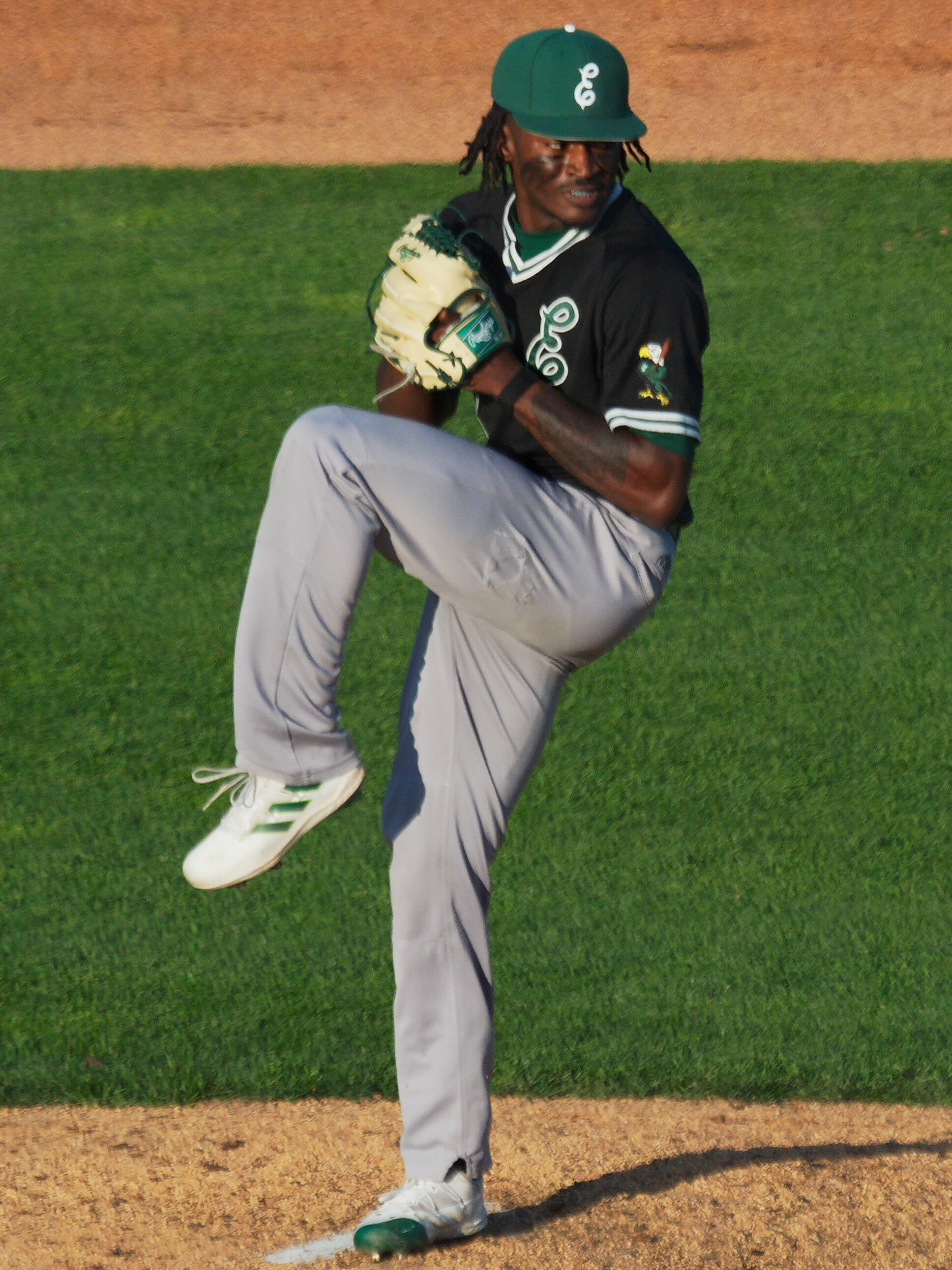
Eagles players Matt Kirk (left) and Cam’Ron McCoy (right) during a game in 2023

== Postseason ==
Year	Region	Round	Opponent	Result
1975	Mideast; College World Series	First Round; Semi-Finals & Finals; CWS First Round; CWS Second Round	Clemson; Michigan; Florida State; South Carolina; Oklahoma	W 5–3; W 3–2; L 4–2; W 2–1; W 2–1 (10); L 5–1 (6); L 7-0
1976	Mideast	First Round; Semi-Finals; Finals Game 1 Finals Game 2 CWS First Round; CWS Second Round; CWS Third Round; CWS Semifinals; Final	Michigan; Illinois State; Michigan; Michigan; Maine; Clemson; Arizona State; Arizona	W 6–0; W 3–0; L 5–3; W 6–0; W 3–2; W 3–2 (10); W 2–1; L 7–6; L 7–1
1981	Mideast	First Round; Second Round; Finals Game 1 Finals Game 2	UNLV; New Orleans; Michigan	W 15–3; W 18–11; L 10–0; L 4–0
1982	Central	Round 1 Round 2 Round 3 Loser's Bracket; Final	Florida State; Hardin-Simmons; Texas; Oklahoma; Texas	W 7–2; W 10–2; L 7–2; W 9–2; L 9–1
2003	Columbus Super Regional	First Round; Second Round	Nebraska; Coastal Carolina; Nebraska	L 16–11; W 9–8; L 18–2
2008	Coral Gables Super Regional	First Round	Arizona; Kentucky	L 13–7; L 3–2

== See also ==
- List of NCAA Division I baseball programs
