= 2025 Bowling Green Falcons baseball team =

2025 Bowling Green Falcons baseball
- Conference: Mid-American Conference
- Record: 33–22 (19–11 MAC)
- Head coach: Kyle Hallock (5th season)
- Assistant coaches: Matt Rembielak (5th season); Joey Gamache (4th season); Joey Cooper (2nd season)
- Home stadium: Steller Field

2025 Mid-American Conference baseball standings
	Conf.				Overall
Team	W		L	PCT	W		L	PCT
Kent State ‍†‍‍	23	–	7	.767	38	–	18	.679
Miami (OH) ‍‍‡‍^{y}	23	–	7	.767	35	–	23	.603
Ball State ‍‍‍	21	–	9	.700	36	–	22	.621
Bowling Green ‍‍‍	19	–	11	.633	33	–	22	.600
Toledo ‍‍‍	17	–	13	.567	32	–	29	.525
Eastern Michigan ‍‍‍	12	–	18	.400	21	–	30	.412
Western Michigan ‍‍‍	12	–	18	.400	19	–	32	.373
Central Michigan ‍‍‍	11	–	19	.367	20	–	35	.364
Northern Illinois ‍‍‍	9	–	21	.300	21	–	33	.389
Akron ‍‍‍	9	–	21	.300	20	–	34	.370
Ohio ‍‍‍	9	–	21	.300	14	–	37	.275
† – Conference champion ‡ – Tournament champion y – Invited to the NCAA Tournament; As of May 31, 2025; Rankings from D1Baseball

The 2025 Bowling Green Falcons baseball team represented Bowling Green State University during the 2025 NCAA Division I baseball season. The Falcons, led by head coach Kyle Hallock in his fifth season, were members of the Mid-American Conference, and played their home games at Steller Field in Bowling Green, Ohio.

== Previous season ==
The Falcons finished the 2024 season 33–20, including 24–6 in conference play, finishing in first place in their conference. The Falcons lost in the lower final for the conference tournament.

=== 2024 MLB draft ===
Round	Pick	Overall pick	Player	Position	MLB team	Source
12	4	349	Nathan Archer	OF	Chicago White Sox	

== Personnel ==
=== Roster ===
2025 Bowling Green Falcons roster
Pitchers: 8 – Micah Smith – Freshman; 9 – Carrson Sova – Freshman; 11 – Nate Kress – (redshirt) Freshman; 12 – Connar Penrod – Senior; 13 – Ty Roder – Junior; 15 – Carson Lumley – (redshirt) Freshman; 19 – Perry Miller – Junior; 20 – Kade Arn – Junior; 22 – Owen Poole – Sophomore; 23 – Landon Willeman – Senior; 25 – Nic Good – Senior; 26 – Titus Lotz – (redshirt) Freshman; 27 – Luke Krouse – Junior; 29 – Logan Bell – Senior; 30 – Jacob Turner – Junior; 39 – CJ Boudreaux – Freshman	Catchers: 3 – Garrett Wright – Sophomore; 31 – Jaxon Brown – Freshman; 34 – Zack Horky – Junior; 38 – Cooper McKenzie – Junior; Infielders: 7 – Brayden Curlis – Freshman; 10 – TJ Takats – Sophomore; 16 – Alex Laird – (redshirt) Freshman; 21 – Sam Seidel – Junior; 24 – Garrett Sloan – Sophomore; 41 – Gunner Antillon – Senior; 43 – Brady Birchmeier – Sophomore	Outfielders: 4 – Chase Chopin – Freshman; 14 – Gavin Ganun – Senior; 17 – Carter Mottice – Freshman; 18 – Carter Gast – Junior; 40 – Caden Parker – Senior; Utility: 1 – Caden Bates – (redshirt) Freshman; 28 – DJ Newman – Junior; 35 – Brock Amelung – Sophomore

=== Coaching staff ===
2025 Bowling Green Falcons coaching staff
Name	Position
Kyle Hallock	Head coach
Joey Cooper	Assistant Coach
Joey Gamache	Assistant Coach/Recruiting Coordinator
Matt Rembielak	Associate Head Baseball Coach

== Schedule and results ==
2025 Bowling Green Falcons baseball game log (33–22)
Regular season (33–20)

February (4–3)
#	Date	Opponent	Rank	Site/stadium	Score	Win	Loss	Save	Attendance	Overall Record	MAC Record
1	February 14	at. Middle Tennessee		Reese Smith Jr. Field	0–18	Phillips (1–0)	**Good** (0–1)	Burch (1)	852	0–1	–
2	February 14	at. Middle Tennessee		Reese Smith Jr. Field	7–6	**Krouse** (1–0)	Alderman (0–1)	**Poole** (1)	852	1–1	–
3	February 15	at. Middle Tennessee		Reese Smith Jr. Field	12–9^{11}	**Penrod** (1–0)	Beranek (0–1)	None	813	2–1	–
4	February 18	at No. 25 Cincinnati		UC Baseball Stadium	Canceled, inclement weather					2–1	–
5	February 21	at. USC Upstate		Cleveland S. Harley Baseball Park	5–2	**Lotz** (1–0)	Bianchini (1–1)	**Poole** (2)	167	3–1	–
6	February 22	at. Presbyterian		Presbyterian Baseball Complex	11–4	**Good** (1–1)	McGregor (1–1)	None	205	4–1	–
7	February 23	at. USC Upstate		Cleveland S. Harley Baseball Park	2–9	Torres (1–0)	**Turner** (0–1)	None	173	4–2	–
8	February 25	at. Butler		Bulldog Park	Canceled, inclement weather					4–2	–
9	February 28	at. Southern Indiana		Itchy Jones Stadium	7–8^{10}	Rubio (1–0)	**Poole** (0–1)	None	120	4–3	–

March (16–4)
#	Date	Opponent	Rank	Site/stadium	Score	Win	Loss	Save	Attendance	Overall Record	MAC Record
10	March 1	at. Southern Illinois		Itchy Jones Stadium	1–4	Niguet (3–0)	**Sova** (0–1)	Wernsing (1)	330	4–4	–
11	March 1	at. Southern Indiana		Itchy Jones Stadium	4–1	**Good** (2–1)	Kimball (2–1)	**Penrod** (1)	58	5–4	–
12	March 2	at. Southern Illinois		Itchy Jones Stadium	6–8	Harpenau (1–0)	**Poole** (0–2)	Gerdes (1)	168	5–5	–
13	March 5	at. Dayton		Woerner Field	14–4^{7}	**Krouse** (2–0)	Grazzal (0–1)	None	175	6–5	–
14	March 7	at. Ohio		Bob Wren Stadium	6–4	**Lotz** (2–0)	Eggl (1–1)	**Penrod** (2)	N/A	7–5	1–0
15	March 8	at. Ohio		Bob Wren Stadium	8–6	**Turner** (1–1)	Peck (0–1)	**Penrod** (3)	N/A	8–5	2–0
16	March 9	at. Ohio		Bob Wren Stadium	10–7	**Roder** (1–0)	Eggl (1–2)	**Lotz** (1)	100	9–5	3–0
17	March 11	Tiffin		Steller Field	8–7	**Kress** (1–0)	Swop (0–1)	None	412	10–5	–
18	March 14	at. Akron		Skeeles Field	7–3	**Roder** (2–0)	Schaeffer (0–3)	**Penrod** (4)	205	11–5	4–0
19	March 15	at. Akron		Skeeles Field	11–5	**Poole** (1–2)	Fenton (0–1)	None	N/A	12–5	5–0
20	March 16	at. Akron		Skeeles Field	6–4	**Willeman** (1–0)	Bednar (1–1)	**Penrod** (5)	152	13–5	6–0
21	March 18	Purdue Fort Wayne		Steller Field	19–18	**Penrod** (2–0)	Orner (0–1)	None	267	14–5	–
22	March 19	Dayton		Steller Field	11–9	**Poole** (2–2)	Judy (0–1)	**Lotz** (2)	260	15–5	–
23	March 21	Kent State		Steller Field	11–10	**Kress** (2–0)	Cariaco (0–2)	None	344	16–5	7–0
24	March 22	Kent State		Steller Field	4–20^{7}	Bean (2–2)	**Good** (2–2)	None	311	16–6	7–1
25	March 23	Kent State		Steller Field	7–9	Cariaco (1–2)	**Penrod** (2–1)	None	298	16–7	7–2
26	March 25	Youngstown State		Steller Field	12–7	**Sova** (1–1)	Wilms (0–2)	None	217	17–7	–
27	March 28	at. Central Michigan		Theunissen Stadium	7–5	**Turner** (2–1)	Espinoza (1–5)	**Penrod** (6)	135	18–7	8–2
28	March 28	at. Central Michigan		Theunissen Stadium	4–3	**Sova** (2–1)	Kostic (0–3)	**Penrod** (7)	131	19–7	9–2
29	March 30	at. Central Michigan		Theunissen Stadium	6–5^{10}	**Poole** (3–2)	Smith (1–1)	**Penrod** (8)	200	20–7	10–2

April (9–7)
#	Date	Opponent	Rank	Site/stadium	Score	Win	Loss	Save	Attendance	Overall Record	MAC Record
30	April 2	at. Michigan State		McLane Stadium	Canceled, inclement weather					20–7	–
31	April 4	Miami (OH)		Steller Field	2–5	Cooper (6–1)	**Roder** (2–1)	Byers (2)	230	20–8	10–3
32	April 4	Miami (OH)		Steller Field	4–7	Berggren (1–1)	**Poole** (3–3)	Fulk (3)	294	20–9	10–4
33	April 6	Miami (OH)		Steller Field	7–6^{10}	**Penrod** (3–1)	Cuthbertson (1–2)	None	277	21–9	11–4
34	April 9	at. Youngstown State		Eastwood Field	17–5^{7}	**Bell** (1–0)	Pelja (1–2)	None	111	22–9	–
35	April 11	at. Western Michigan		Hyames Field	1–6	McKinstry (2–6)	**Turner** (2–2)	None	170	22–10	11–5
36	April 12	at. Western Michigan		Hyames Field	3–1	**Sova** (3–1)	Wizceb (2–6)	**Penrod** (9)	194	23–10	12–5
37	April 13	at. Western Michigan		Hyames Field	2–7	Gaber (3–3)	**Good** (2–3)	None	201	23–11	12–6
38	April 15	at. Purdue Fort Wayne		Mastodon Field	15–5	**Arn** (1–0)	Pearson (3–2)	None	111	24–11	–
39	April 17	Ball State		Steller Field	6–4	**Turner** (3–2)	Johnson (6–1)	**Penrod** (10)	265	25–11	13–6
40	April 18	Ball State		Steller Field	18–23	Harker (4–1)	**Penrod** (3–2)	None	363	25–12	13–7
41	April 19	Ball State		Steller Field	12–16	Quinn (3–1)	**Kress** (2–1)	None	355	25–13	13–8
42	April 22	at. Michigan		Wilpon Baseball Complex	2–9	Rogers (4–2)	**Krouse** (2–1)	None	493	25–14	–
43	April 25	Eastern Michigan		Steller Field	11–4	**Poole** (4–3)	Milligan (0–3)	None	374	26–14	14–8
44	April 26	Eastern Michigan		Steller Field	10–9	**Penrod** (4–2)	Davis (2–2)	None	374	27–14	15–8
45	April 27	Eastern Michigan		Steller Field	8–4	**Roder** (3–1)	Kapa (3–5)	None	362	28–14	16–8
46	April 30	Findlay		Steller Field	6–3	**Arn** (2–0)	O'Rourke (0–1)	**Penrod** (11)	207	29–14	–

May (4–8)
#	Date	Opponent	Rank	Site/stadium	Score	Win	Loss	Save	Attendance	Overall Record	MAC Record
47	May 2	vs. Toledo		Fifth Third Field	8–3	**Turner** (4–2)	Tabor (1–4)	None	2,325	30–14	17–8
48	May 3	at. Toledo		Scott Park Baseball Complex	3–8	Bergman (2–3)	**Sova** (3–2)	None	255	30–15	17–9
49	May 3	at. Toledo		Scott Park Baseball Complex	1–8	Sasse (2–3)	**Willeman** (1–1)	None	233	30–16	17–10
50	May 6	Butler		Steller Field	9–7	**Boudreaux** (1–1)	Thomas (1–1)	**Penrod** (12)	195	31–16	–
51	May 9	at. Notre Dame		Frank Eck Stadium	0–10^{7}	Radel (6–4)	**Turner** (4–3)	None	789	31–17	–
52	May 10	at. Notre Dame		Frank Eck Stadium	1–11^{8}	Fox (4–3)	**Sova** (3–3)	None	931	31–18	–
53	May 11	Notre Dame		Steller Field	0–4	Dennies (3–3)	**Lotz** (2–1)	None	524	31–19	–
54	May 13	at. Toledo		Scott Park Baseball Complex	Canceled, inclement weather					31–19	–
55	May 15	Northern Illinois		Steller Field	8–14	Cihocki (2–3)	**Turner** (4–4)	None	233	31–20	17–11
56	May 16	Northern Illinois		Steller Field	5–4	**Penrod** (5–2)	Hise (1–3)	None	207	32–20	18–11
57	May 17	Northern Illinois		Steller Field	4–2	**Lotz** (3–1)	Ruh (2–5)	**Roder** (1)	239	33–20	19–11

Postseason (0–2)

MAC Tournament (0–2)
#	Date	Opponent	Rank	Site/stadium	Score	Win	Loss	Save	Attendance	Overall Record	MACT Record
58	May 22	No. 5 Toledo	4	Mercy Health Stadium	12–14	Leininger (6–5)	**Turner** (4–5)	Shunck (3)	N/A	33–21	0–1
59	May 22	No. 6 Eastern Michigan	4	Mercy Health Stadium	7–10^{10}	Davis (3–5)	**Willeman** (1–2)	None	N/A	33–22	0–2

- Win
- Loss
- Postponement
- Bold: Falcons team member
- * = Conference Game
