= List of Bowling Green Falcons baseball seasons =

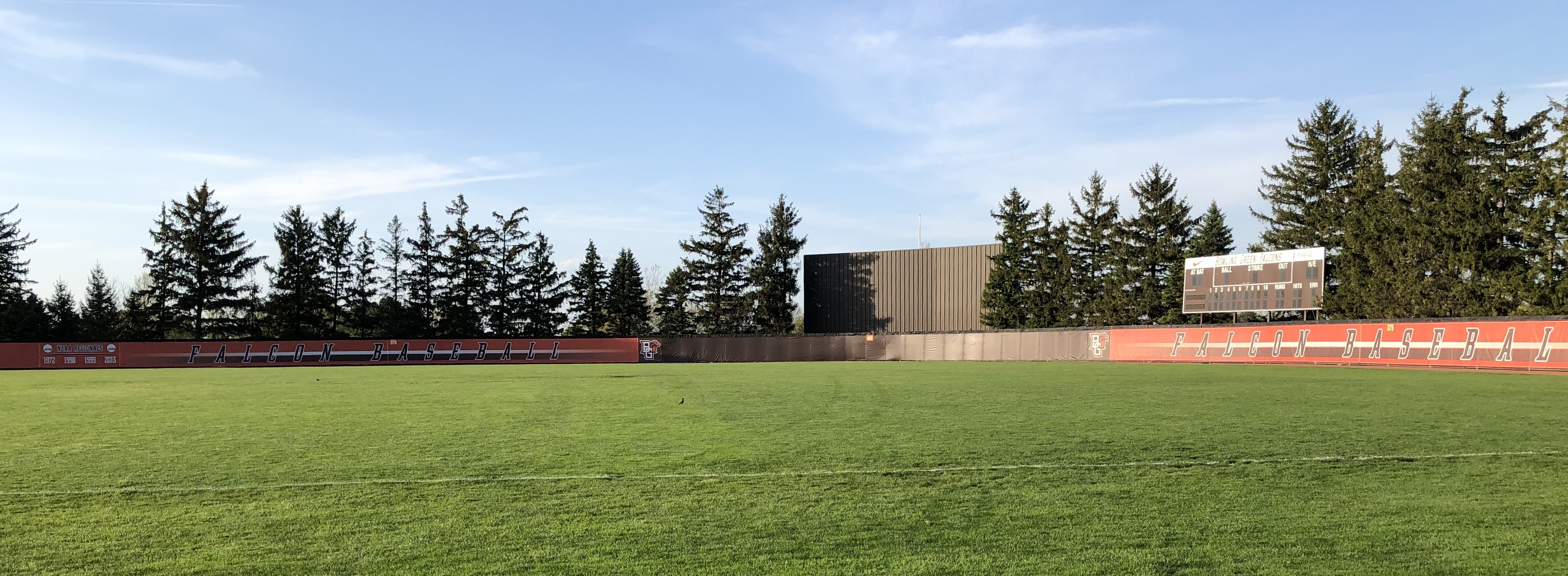
Steller Field

This is a list of Bowling Green Falcons baseball seasons. The Bowling Green Falcons baseball team represents Bowling Green State University and this list documents the season-by-season records of the Falcons from 1915 to the present including conference and national post season records. Bowling Green's baseball program fielded its first varsity team in 1921. From 1921 until 1932, Bowling Green was a member of the Northwest Ohio League and was an independent until 1953 when the school joined the Mid-American Conference. The Falcons were in the East Division of the MAC from 2006 to 2017 until the MAC eliminated divisions.

The Falcons have appeared in four NCAA tournaments in 1972, 1998, 1999 and 2013. The program has won seven NWOIAA championships and has been named MAC regular season conference champions seven times and its tournament champion three times.

From 1915 until 1926, the athletic programs at Bowling Green were known as the Normals, after the institution's original name Bowling Green State Normal School.

== Season results ==
College World Series Champions	College World Series appearance	NCAA tournament berth	Conference Tournament champions	Conference Regular season Champions	Division champions

Season	Head coach	Conference (Note: Program joined the NCAA in 1953.)	Division	Season Results									Tournament Results		Final poll (Note: Collegiate Baseball began team rankings in 1959.)
Season	Head coach	Conference	Division	Overall				Conference					Conference	Postseason (Note: Postseason play involving the NCAA Division I Baseball Championship began in 1947.)	CB
Season	Head coach	Conference	Division	Wins	Losses	Ties	%	Wins	Losses	Ties	%	Finish	Conference	Postseason	CB
Bowling Green Falcons
1915	F. G. Beyerman	—	—	1	3	0	.250	—	—	—	—	—	—	—	—
1916	Records unknown														
1917	Records unknown														
1918	F. G. Beyerman	—	—	2	1	0	.667	—	—	—	—	—	—	—	—
1919	F. G. Beyerman	—	—	0	6	0	.000	—	—	—	—	—	—	—	—
1920	F. G. Beyerman	—	—	3	3	0	.500	—	—	—	—	—	—	—	—
1921	F. G. Beyerman	NWOIAA	—	6	1	2	.778	6	1	2	.778	1st	—	—	—
1922	Earl Krieger	NWOIAA	—	7	2	0	.777	7	2	0	.777	1st	—	—	—
1923	Allen W. Snyder	NWOIAA	—	5	3	0	.625	5	3	0	.625	?	—	—	—
1924	Ray B. McCandless	NWOIAA	—	2	3	2	.429	2	2	1	.500	?	—	—	—
1925	Warren Steller	NWOIAA	—	8	2	0	.800	7	1	0	.875	1st	—	—	—
1926	Paul Landis	NWOIAA	—	9	4	0	.692	5	2	0	.714	1st	—	—	—
1927	Paul Landis	NWOIAA	—	4	7	0	.364	0	6	0	.000	?	—	—	—
1928	Warren Steller	NWOIAA	—	7	4	0	.636	6	1	0	.857	T-1st	—	—	—
1929	Warren Steller	NWOIAA	—	9	3	0	.750	5	3	0	.625	?	—	—	—
1930	Warren Steller	NWOIAA	—	4	8	0	.333	4	4	0	.500	—	—	—	—
1931	Warren Steller	NWOIAA	—	8	3	0	.727	8	0	0	1.000	1st	—	—	—
1932	Warren Steller	NWOIAA	—	7	4	0	.636	5	3	0	.625	1st	—	—	—
1933	Warren Steller	—	—	5	5	0	.500	—	—	—	—	—	—	—	—
1934	Warren Steller	—	—	6	5	0	.546	—	—	—	—	—	—	—	—
1935	Warren Steller	No team													
1936	Warren Steller	—	—	1	4	0	.200	—	—	—	—	—	—	—	—
1937	Warren Steller	No team													
1938	Warren Steller	—	—	3	4	0	.429	—	—	—	—	—	—	—	—
1939	Warren Steller	—	—	3	5	0	.375	—	—	—	—	—	—	—	—
1940	Warren Steller	—	—	4	4	0	.500	—	—	—	—	—	—	—	—
1941	Warren Steller	—	—	4	8	0	.333	—	—	—	—	—	—	—	—
1942	Warren Steller	—	—	7	4	0	.636	—	—	—	—	—	—	—	—
1943	Warren Steller	—	—	6	3	0	.667	—	—	—	—	—	—	—	—
1944	Warren Steller	—	—	20	3	0	.870	—	—	—	—	—	—	—	—
1945	Warren Steller	—	—	5	5	0	.500	—	—	—	—	—	—	—	—
1946	Warren Steller	—	—	10	2	0	.833	—	—	—	—	—	—	—	—
1947	Warren Steller	—	—	6	4	0	.600	—	—	—	—	—	—	—	—
1948	Warren Steller	—	—	7	8	0	.467	—	—	—	—	—	—	—	—
1949	Warren Steller	—	—	8	6	0	.571	—	—	—	—	—	—	—	—
1950	Warren Steller	—	—	10	5	0	.667	—	—	—	—	—	—	—	—
1951	Warren Steller	—	—	8	4	0	.667	—	—	—	—	—	—	—	—
1952	Warren Steller	—	—	8	3	0	.727	—	—	—	—	—	—	—	—
1953	Warren Steller	MAC	—	8	6	0	.571	4	4	0	.500	3rd	—	—	—
1954	Warren Steller	MAC	—	13	3	0	.813	7	3	0	.700	2nd	—	—	—
1955	Warren Steller	MAC	—	8	5	0	.615	7	3	0	.700	2nd	—	—	—
1956	Warren Steller	MAC	—	4	11	0	.267	3	7	0	.300	6th	—	—	—
1957	Warren Steller	MAC	—	6	9	0	.400	3	7	0	.300	T-5th	—	—	—
1958	Warren Steller	MAC	—	7	7	0	.500	4	5	0	.444	3rd	—	—	—
1959	Warren Steller	MAC	—	12	6	0	.667	6	6	0	.500	4th	—	—	
1960	Dick Young	MAC	—	11	8	0	.579	4	5	0	.444	5th	—	—	
1961	Dick Young	MAC	—	6	12	1	.342	2	8	0	.200	T-5th	—	—	
1962	Dick Young	MAC	—	16	10	0	.615	5	4	0	.556	4th	—	—	
1963	Dick Young	MAC	—	17	11	1	.604	7	5	0	.583	3rd	—	—	
1964	Dick Young	MAC	—	17	9	1	.648	5	6	0	.455	4th	—	—	
1965	Dick Young	MAC	—	17	9	0	.654	8	2	0	.800	3rd	—	—	
1966	Dick Young	MAC	—	16	6	1	.717	3	3	0	.500	4th	—	—	
1967	Dick Young	MAC	—	20	9	1	.667	6	6	0	.500	3rd	—	—	
1968	Dick Young	MAC	—	13	13	1	.500	4	5	0	.444	5th	—	—	
1969	Dick Young	MAC	—	16	19	0	.457	7	8	0	.467	4th	—	—	
1970	Dick Young	MAC	—	16	19	0	.457	5	8	0	.385	4th	—	—	
1971	Dick Young	MAC	—	19	21	0	.475	8	6	0	.571	4th	—	—	
1972	Don Purvis	MAC	—	24	12	2	.658	6	2	1	.722	1st	Defeated N. Illinois, 2—0; Defeated C. Michigan 7—5 (10)	District 4 Regional	
1973	Don Purvis	MAC	—	19	20	1	.488	10	10	0	.500	4th	—	—	
1974	Don Purvis	MAC	—	30	14	0	.682	11	5	0	.688	2nd	—	—	
1975	Don Purvis	MAC	—	26	24	0	.520	8	10	0	.444	7th	—	—	
1976	Don Purvis	MAC	—	33	20	0	.623	8	8	0	.500	T-5th	—	—	
1977	Don Purvis	MAC	—	36	18	0	.667	5	7	0	.417	6th	—	—	
1978	Don Purvis	MAC	—	33	15	1	.684	11	6	0	.647	3rd	—	—	
1979	Don Purvis	MAC	—	32	18	0	.640	9	7	0	.563	5th	—	—	
1980	Don Purvis	MAC	—	26	27	0	.491	11	5	0	.688	T-2nd	—	—	
1981	Don Purvis	MAC	—	17	28	1	.380	5	11	0	.313	8th	—	—	
1982	Don Purvis	MAC	East	29	23	1	.557	5	10	0	.333	5th	—	—	
1983	Ed Platzer	MAC	East	32	17	0	.582	9	7	0	.563	3rd	—	—	
1984	Ed Platzer	MAC	—	27	30	1	.474	10	19	1	.350	9th	—	—	
1985	Ed Platzer	MAC	—	25	28	2	.473	12	15	1	.446	7th	—	—	
1986	Ed Platzer	MAC	—	22	25	2	.469	12	16	0	.429	6th	—	—	
1987	Ed Platzer	MAC	—	17	33	0	.340	7	21	0	.250	9th	—	—	
1988	Ed Platzer	MAC	—	27	30	1	.474	13	18	0	.419	7th	—	—	
1989	Ed Platzer	MAC	—	23	29	0	.442	6	25	0	.194	9th	—	—	
1990	Ed Platzer	MAC	—	29	25	0	.537	10	17	0	.370	7th	—	—	
1991	Danny Schmitz	MAC	—	16	39	1	.295	7	23	0	.233	9th	—	—	
1992	Danny Schmitz	MAC	—	14	35	1	.290	7	22	1	.250	9th	—	—	
1993	Danny Schmitz	MAC	—	19	27	1	.415	11	17	0	.393	9th	—	—	
1994	Danny Schmitz	MAC	—	29	18	0	.617	16	10	0	.615	3rd	First Round	—	
1995	Danny Schmitz	MAC	—	34	20	0	.630	22	8	0	.733	1st	First Round	—	
1996	Danny Schmitz	MAC	—	28	22	0	.560	14	17	0	.452	8th	DNP	—	
1997	Danny Schmitz	MAC	—	24	27	0	.471	13	17	0	.433	8th	DNP	—	
1998	Danny Schmitz	MAC	East	34	21	0	.618	17	10	0	.630	1st	1st	Atlantic I Regional	
1999	Danny Schmitz	MAC	East	36	24	0	.600	22	10	0	.688	1st	1st	Columbus Regional	
2000	Danny Schmitz	MAC	East	29	24	1	.546	14	12	0	.539	4th	DNP	—	
2001	Danny Schmitz	MAC	East	36	18	0	.667	18	9	0	.667	2nd	2nd Round	—	
2002	Danny Schmitz	MAC	East	32	22	0	.593	18	7	0	.720	1st	Semifinals	—	
2003	Danny Schmitz	MAC	West	17	28	0	.378	9	18	0	.333	6th	DNP	—	
2004	Danny Schmitz	MAC	West	28	19	0	.596	13	11	0	.542	4th	DNP	—	
2005	Danny Schmitz	MAC	West	33	18	0	.647	12	8	0	.600	3rd	2nd Round	—	
2006	Danny Schmitz	MAC	East	26	27	0	.491	11	16	0	.407	4th	DNP	—	
2007	Danny Schmitz	MAC	East	22	32	0	.407	7	20	0	.259	6th	DNP	—	
2008	Danny Schmitz	MAC	East	32	20	0	.615	16	8	0	.667	T-1st	Semifinals	—	
2009	Danny Schmitz	MAC	East	28	22	0	.560	19	9	0	.679	1st	First Round	—	
2010	Danny Schmitz	MAC	East	31	23	1	.573	19	8	0	.704	T-2nd	Semifinals	—	
2011	Danny Schmitz	MAC	East	20	31	0	.392	11	14	0	.440	T-3rd	First Round	—	
2012	Danny Schmitz	MAC	East	20	33	0	.377	9	18	0	.333	6th	DNP	—	
2013	Danny Schmitz	MAC	East	24	31	0	.436	13	14	0	.481	6th	1st	Nashville Regional	
2014	Danny Schmitz	MAC	East	25	25	0	.500	15	12	0	.556	5th	First Round	—	
2015	Danny Schmitz	MAC	East	19	24	0	.442	11	10	0	.524	T-5th	Semifinals	—	
2016	Danny Schmitz	MAC	East	17	37	0	.315	7	17	0	.292	.292	DNP	—	
2017	Danny Schmitz	MAC	East	15	34	0	.306	9	15	0	.375	T-8th	DNP	—	
2018	Danny Schmitz	MAC	—	11	39	0	.220	6	19	0	.240	10th	DNP	—	
2019	Danny Schmitz	MAC	—	16	33	0	.327	8	18	0	.308	8th	DNP	—	
2020	Danny Schmitz	MAC	—	2	11	0	.154	—	—	—	—	—	Season canceled due to the COVID-19 pandemic	—	
2021	Kyle Hallock	MAC	—	20	30	0	.400	18	22	0	.450	7th	DNP	—	
2022	Kyle Hallock	MAC	—	18	34	0	.346	14	24	0	.368	9th	DNP	—	
2023	Kyle Hallock	MAC	—	20	30	0	.400	13	17	0	.433	7th	DNP	—	
2024	Kyle Hallock	MAC	—	33	20	0	.623	24	6	0	.800	1st	3rd	—	
2025	Kyle Hallock	MAC	—	33	22	0	.600	19	11	0	.633	4th	6th	—	
2026	Kyle Hallock	MAC	—	19	35	0	.352	12	21	0	.364	T-9th	DNP	—	
Total				1,818	1,731	27	.512	1915–2026 (all games)							

=== Notes ===
Sources:
