= 2024 Bowling Green Falcons baseball team =

2024 Bowling Green Falcons baseball

MAC regular season champions
- Conference: Mid-American Conference
- Record: 33–20 (25–6 MAC)
- Head coach: Kyle Hallock (4th season)
- Assistant coaches: Matt Rembielak (4th season); Joey Gamache (3rd season); Joey Cooper (1st season)
- Home stadium: Steller Field

2024 Mid-American Conference baseball standings
	Conf.						Overall
Team	W		L		T	PCT	W		L		T	PCT
Bowling Green ‍†‍‍	25	–	6	–	0	.806	33	–	20	–	0	.623
Western Michigan ‍‍‡‍^{y}	19	–	11	–	0	.633	32	–	21	–	0	.604
Ball State ‍‍‍	18	–	12	–	0	.600	35	–	23	–	1	.602
Miami (OH) ‍‍‍	17	–	13	–	0	.567	27	–	27	–	0	.500
Kent State ‍‍‍	16	–	13	–	0	.552	26	–	27	–	0	.491
Toledo ‍‍‍	16	–	15	–	0	.516	27	–	32	–	0	.458
Northern Illinois ‍‍‍	14	–	16	–	0	.467	21	–	33	–	0	.389
Ohio ‍‍‍	13	–	17	–	0	.433	18	–	32	–	0	.360
Akron ‍‍‍	10	–	19	–	0	.345	15	–	38	–	0	.283
Eastern Michigan ‍‍‍	9	–	21	–	0	.300	14	–	38	–	0	.269
Central Michigan ‍‍‍	8	–	22	–	0	.267	17	–	38	–	0	.309
† – Conference champion ‡ – Tournament champion y – Invited to the NCAA Tournament; As of May 25, 2024; Rankings from D1Baseball

The 2024 Bowling Green Falcons baseball team represented Bowling Green State University during the 2024 NCAA Division I baseball season. The Falcons, led by head coach Kyle Hallock in his fourth season, were members of the Mid-American Conference, and played their home games at Steller Field in Bowling Green, Ohio.

On March 16, the Falcons set a program record with 33 runs batted in against Ball State in a 34–8 victory. The 34 runs scored were the most in a MAC game and second-most in program history. On March 23, the Falcons defeated Akron 11–6 to advance to 8–0 in MAC play, the best conference start in program history. The Falcons started MAC play 17–0 which was both a school and MAC record. They also started 10–0 at home which was also a program record.

On May 12, Bowling Green defeated Eastern Michigan 8–6, which secured their first regular season championship since the 2009 season.

== Previous season ==
The Falcons finished the 2023 season 20–30, including 13–17 in conference play, finishing in seventh place in their conference. The Falcons did not qualify for the conference tournament.

== Personnel ==
=== Roster ===
2024 Bowling Green Falcons roster
Pitchers: 11 – Nate Kress – Freshman; 12 – Connar Penrod – Junior; 14 – Carson Lumley – (redshirt) Freshman; 17 – Rigo Ramos – Senior; 19 – Perry Miller – Sophomore; 20 – Kade Arn – Sophomore; 22 – Owen Poole – Freshman; 23 – Landon Willeman – Junior; 24 – Peyton Wilson – Senior; 25 – Nic Good – Junior; 26 – Titus Lotz – Freshman; 27 – Luke Krouse – Sophomore; 29 – Logan Bell – Senior; 30 – Jacob Turner – Sophomore; 31 – Isaiah Seidel – Senior; 32 – Levi Gazarek – Junior; 33 – Calvin Mitchell – Sophomore; 35 – Brock Amelung – Freshman	Catchers: 3 – Garrett Wright – Freshman; 34 – Zack Horky – Sophomore; 37 – Austin Morman – Freshman; 38 – Cooper McKenzie – Sophomore; Infielders: 1 – Caden Bates – Freshman; 4 – David Silva – Senior; 10 – TJ Takats – Freshman; 13 – Landon Roque – Senior; 16 – Alex Laird – Freshman; 18 – Tyler Ross – Senior; 21 – Sam Seidel – Sophomore; 43 – Brady Birchmeier – (redshirt) Freshman	Outfielders: 7 – Jack Krause – Senior; 8 – Nathan Archer – Junior; 14 – Gavin Ganun – Junior; 40 – Caden Parker – Junior; Utility: 9 – Leighton Banjoff – Senior; 28 – DJ Newman – Sophomore

=== Coaching staff ===
2024 Bowling Green Falcons coaching staff
Name	Position
Kyle Hallock	Head coach
Joey Cooper	Assistant Coach
Joey Gamache	Assistant Coach
Matt Rembielak	Assistant Coach/Recruiting Coordinator

== Schedule and results ==
2024 Bowling Green Falcons baseball game log (33–20)
Regular season (32–18)

February (2–4)
#	Date	Opponent	Rank	Site/stadium	Score	Win	Loss	Save	Attendance	Overall Record	MAC Record
1	February 16	at. Middle Tennessee		Reese Smith Jr. Field	8–12	Akens (1–0)	**Newman** (0–1)	None	983	0–1	–
2	February 17	at. Middle Tennessee		Reese Smith Jr. Field	4–5	Sells (1–0)	**Penrod** (0–1)	None	605	0–2	–
3	February 18	at. Middle Tennessee		Reese Smith Jr. Field	7–3	**Mitchell** (1–0)	Beranek (0–1)	None	796	1–2	–
4	February 23	at. Memphis		FedExPark	9–1	**Newman** (1–1)	Warren (0–1)	None	573	2–2	–
5	February 24	at. Memphis		FedExPark	13–14	Sanders (1–0)	**Turner** (0–1)	None	502	2–3	–
6	February 25	at. Memphis		FedExPark	7–13	Robinson (1–0)	**Mitchell** (1–1)	Durham (1)	435	2–4	–

March (10–6)
#	Date	Opponent	Rank	Site/stadium	Score	Win	Loss	Save	Attendance	Overall Record	MAC Record
7	March 1	at. #8 Tennessee		Lindsey Nelson Stadium	1–11	Causey (2–0)	**Newman** (1–2)	None	4,446	2–5	–
8	March 2	at. #8 Tennessee		Lindsey Nelson Stadium	1–12	Beam (2–0)	**Good** (0–1)	None	5,343	2–6	–
9	March 3	at. #8 Tennessee		Lindsey Nelson Stadium	6–16	Connell (1–0)	**Mitchell** (1–2)	None	5,385	2–7	–
10	March 8	at. Miami (OH)*		McKie Field at Hayden Park	17–16	**Turner** (1–1)	Galdoni (1–2)	None	N/A	3–7	1–0
11	March 9	at. Miami (OH)*		McKie Field at Hayden Park	12–1	**Good** (1–1)	Ross (0–1)	None	107	4–7	2–0
12	March 10	at. Miami (OH)*		McKie Field at Hayden Park	14–10^{12}	**Miller** (1–0)	Byers (0–1)	None	124	5–7	3–0
13	March 13	at. Dayton		Woerner Field	4–14	Newell (1–0)	**Arn** (0–1)	None	243	5–8	–
14	March 15	at. Ball State*		Ball Diamond	5–4	**Newman** (2–2)	Blain (0–1)	**Turner (1)**	237	6–8	4–0
15	March 16	at. Ball State*		Ball Diamond	34–8	**Miller** (2–0)	Schulfer (1–3)	None	242	7–8	5–0
16	March 17	at. Ball State*		Ball Diamond	15–8	**Penrod** (1–1)	Hartlaub (1–1)	None	241	8–8	6–0
17	March 19	at. Youngstown State		Eastwood Field	Canceled, inclement weather					8–8	–
18	March 22	Akron*		Steller Field	10–1	**Newman** (3–2)	Tourney (0–4)	None	260	9–8	7–0
19	March 23	Akron*		Steller Field	11–6	**Miller** (3–0)	Kahook (1–1)	None	250	10–8	8–0
20	March 24	Akron*		Steller Field	15–5	**Mitchell** (2–2)	Atkins (0–3)	None	250	11–8	9–0
21	March 26	at. Notre Dame		Frank Eck Stadium	Canceled, inclement weather					11–8	–
22	March 28	at. Xavier		J. Page Hayden Field	10–11	Hughes (1–3)	**Turner** (1–2)	None	300	11–9	–
23	March 29	at. Xavier		J. Page Hayden Field	3–10	Schmidt (4–2)	**Good** (1–2)	None	300	11–10	–
24	March 30	at. Xavier		J. Page Hayden Field	8–4	**Poole** (1–0)	Boyle (3–2)	**Penrod (1)**	237	12–10	–

April (12–4)
#	Date	Opponent	Rank	Site/stadium	Score	Win	Loss	Save	Attendance	Overall Record	MAC Record
25	April 2	at. Oakland		Oakland University Baseball Field	17–18^{7}		Postponed, inclement weather. To be resumed May 1				
26	April 5	at. Northern Illinois*		Ralph McKinzie Field	7–4	**Penrod** (2–1)	Stewart (0–2)	None	283	13–10	10–0
27	April 6	at. Northern Illinois*		Ralph McKinzie Field	9–3	**Good** (2–2)	Brouwer (3–4)	None	274	14–10	11–0
28	April 6	at. Northern Illinois*		Ralph McKinzie Field	11–1	**Willeman** (1–0)	Hann (0–1)	None	473	15–10	12–0
29	April 9	at. Ohio State		Bill Davis Stadium	4–6	Brown (3–0)	**Turner** (1–3)	Eckhardt (5)	1,199	15–11	–
30	April 10	Purdue Fort Wayne		Steller Field	8–7	**Wilson** (1–0)	Fee (4–1)	None	230	16–11	–
31	April 13	Central Michigan*		Steller Field	10–8	**Newman** (4–2)	Mrakitsch (2–5)	**Wilson (1)**	415	17–11	13–0
32	April 13	Central Michigan*		Steller Field	10–7	**Seidel** (1–0)	Vitas (1–4)	**Turner (2)**	415	18–11	14–0
33	April 14	Central Michigan*		Steller Field	18–17^{11}	**Ramos** (1–0)	Knorr (0–2)	None	455	19–11	15–0
34	April 16	Youngstown State		Steller Field	12–9	**Miller** (4–0)	Perez (0–1)	**Seidel (1)**	244	20–11	–
35	April 19	Ohio*		Steller Field	14–5	**Ramos** (2–0)	Masters (1–3)	None	332	21–11	16–0
36	April 20	Ohio*		Steller Field	26–5	**Good** (3–2)	Knapschaefer (3–3)	None	526	22–11	17–0
37	April 21	Ohio*		Steller Field	2–4	Weber (4–3)	**Wilson** (1–1)	None	245	22–12	17–1
38	April 23	Dayton		Steller Field	Canceled, inclement weather					22–12	–
39	April 26	at. Kent State*		Schoonover Stadium	5–6	Cariaco (4–1)	**Wilson** (1–2)	None	711	22–13	17–2
40	April 27	at. Kent State*		Schoonover Stadium	10–0	**Good** (4–2)	Miceli (0–4)	None	657	23–13	18–2
41	April 28	at. Kent State*		Schoonover Stadium	2–12	Chalus (5–2)	**Willeman** (1–1)	None	662	23–14	18–3
42	April 30	Toledo*		Steller Field	17–9	**Krouse** (1–0)	Shunck (1–4)	None	317	24–14	19–3

May (8–4)
#	Date	Opponent	Rank	Site/stadium	Score	Win	Loss	Save	Attendance	Overall Record	MAC Record
25 (2)	May 1	Oakland		Steller Field	18–21	Fekete (4–3)	**Wilson** (1–3)	None	171	24–15	–
43	May 1	Oakland		Steller Field	19–8	**Arn** (1–1)	Smith (1–1)	None	181	25–15	–
44	May 3	Western Michigan*		Steller Field	8–3	**Good** (5–2)	Miller (3–5)	**Seidel (2)**	265	26–15	20–3
45	May 4	Western Michigan*		Steller Field	4–6	Vlcek (4–2)	**Willeman** (1–2)	Thelen (1)	313	26–16	20–4
46	May 5	Western Michigan*		Steller Field	0–11	Shapiro (1–1)	**Miller** (4–1)	None	315	26–17	20–5
47	May 7	at. Michigan State		Drayton McLane Baseball Stadium at John H. Kobs Field	Canceled, inclement weather					26–17	–
48	May 8	at. Purdue Fort Wayne		Mastodon Field	5–2	**Ramos** (3–2)	Evans (0–1)	None	214	27–17	–
49	May 10	at. Eastern Michigan*		Oestrike Stadium	9–10	Sanfilipo (1–0)	**Penrod** (2–2)	None	449	27–18	20–6
50	May 11	at. Eastern Michigan*		Oestrike Stadium	7–1	**Willeman** (2–2)	Beckner (2–9)	**Arn (1)**	368	28–18	21–6
51	May 12	at. Eastern Michigan*		Oestrike Stadium	8–6	**Miller** (5–1)	Lindsey (0–5)	**Turner (3)**	350	29–18	22–6
51	May 16	Toledo*		Steller Field	3–1	**Seidel** (2–0)	Szynski (0–4)	**Turner (4)**	306	30–18	23–6
52	May 17	Toledo*		Fifth Third Field	8–6	**Willeman** (3–2)	Johnson (3–3)	**Krouse (1)**	2,942	31–18	24–6
53	May 18	Toledo*		Steller Field	3–2	**Penrod** (3–2)	Bergman (3–6)	**Turner (5)**	450	32–18	25–6

Postseason (1–2)

MAC Tournament (1–2)
#	Date	Opponent	Rank	Site/stadium	Score	Win	Loss	Save	Attendance	Overall Record	MACT Record
54	May 23	No. 4 Miami (OH)	1	Mercy Health Stadium	12–4	**Good** (6–2)	Mastrian IV (2–4)	None	N/A	33–18	1–0
55	May 24	No. 2 Western Michigan	1	Mercy Health Stadium	0–11	Vlcek (5–3)	**Willeman** (3–3)	None	1,248	33–19	1–1
56	May 25	No. 3 Ball State	1	Mercy Health Stadium	5–10	Klein (2–0)	**Ramos** (3–1)	None	N/A	33–20	1–2

- Win
- Loss
- Postponement
- Bold: Falcons team member
- * = Conference Game
