= 2019 Purdue Fort Wayne Mastodons baseball team =

American college baseball season

2019 Purdue Fort Wayne Mastodons baseball
- Conference: Summit League
- Record: 7–45 (2–28 Summit)
- Head coach: Bobby Pierce (11th season)
- Assistant coach: Conner Lawhead (5th season)
- Pitching coach: Grant Birley (11th season)
- Home stadium: Mastodon Field

2019 Summit League baseball standings
	Conf.						Overall
Team	W		L		T	PCT	W		L		T	PCT
Omaha ‍†‍‡‍^{y}	20	–	10	–	0	.667	31	–	24	–	1	.563
South Dakota State ‍‍‍	19	–	10	–	0	.655	28	–	22	–	0	.560
Oral Roberts ‍‍‍	17	–	12	–	0	.586	29	–	26	–	0	.527
Western Illinois ‍‍‍	16	–	14	–	0	.533	22	–	31	–	0	.415
North Dakota State ‍‍‍	15	–	15	–	0	.500	19	–	24	–	0	.442
Purdue Fort Wayne ‍‍‍	2	–	28	–	0	.067	7	–	45	–	0	.135
† – Conference champion ‡ – Tournament champion y – Invited to the NCAA tournament As of June 5, 2019; Rankings from D1Baseball

The 2019 Purdue Fort Wayne Mastodons baseball team was a baseball team that represented Purdue University Fort Wayne in the 2019 NCAA Division I baseball season. The Mastodons were members of the Summit League and played their home games at Mastodon Field in Fort Wayne, Indiana. They were led by eleventh-year head coach Bobby Pierce.

== Previous season ==
The Mastodons finished the 2018 NCAA Division I baseball season 11–37 overall (7–23 conference) and sixth place in conference standings. Following the conclusion of the regular season, the Mastodons failed to qualify to play in the 2018 NCAA tournament.

== Roster ==
2019 Purdue Fort Wayne Mastodons baseball team
Players
Coaches

#	Pos.	Name	B/T	Height	Weight	Year	Previous school	Home town
1	RHP	Shane Odzark	R/R	6 ft 2 in (1.88 m)	190 lb (86 kg)	RS Sr	Grand Rapids Community College	Algonac, Michigan
2	C	Dylan Stewart	R/R	5 ft 10 in (1.78 m)	160 lb (73 kg)	Fr	Milford H. S.	Milford, Ohio
4	OF	Camden Nisenson	L/L	6 ft 1 in (1.85 m)	185 lb (84 kg)	Fr	Crystal Lake Central H. S.	Crystal Lake, Illinois
5		Garrett Mohler	L/R	6 ft 2 in (1.88 m)	195 lb (88 kg)	RS Jr	New Haven H. S.	New Haven, Indiana
6	C	Braxton Turner	R/R	6 ft 0 in (1.83 m)	185 lb (84 kg)	Fr	Greenfield-Central H. S.	Greenfield, Indiana
7	RHP	Duane Miller	R/R	6 ft 0 in (1.83 m)	180 lb (82 kg)	Jr	Edgerton H. S.	Edgerton, Ohio
8	INF	Trenton Stoner	R/R	6 ft 0 in (1.83 m)	185 lb (84 kg)	So	Clay H. S.	Granger, Indiana
9	RHP	Chase Phelps	R/R	6 ft 0 in (1.83 m)	195 lb (88 kg)	RS Jr	Snider H. S.	Fort Wayne, Indiana
10	INF	Jack Long	R/R	6 ft 0 in (1.83 m)	185 lb (84 kg)	So	Hamilton Southeastern H. S.	Fishers, Indiana
11	RHP	Garrett Hill	R/R	6 ft 0 in (1.83 m)	165 lb (75 kg)	Fr	University H. S.	Zionsville, Indiana
12	INF	Brian Erbe	R/R	6 ft 1 in (1.85 m)	185 lb (84 kg)	Fr	Oakwood H. S.	Dayton, Ohio
13	INF	Aaron Chapman	R/R	6 ft 0 in (1.83 m)	190 lb (86 kg)	Fr	Waterford Union H. S.	Waterford, Wisconsin
14	RHP	Brian Skelton	R/R	6 ft 2 in (1.88 m)	205 lb (93 kg)	So	Westfield H. S.	Westfield, Indiana
15		Charles Lyons	R/R	5 ft 8 in (1.73 m)	160 lb (73 kg)	Fr	Southfield A&T H. S.	Southfield, Michigan
17	INF	Travis Upp	L/R	6 ft 2 in (1.88 m)	200 lb (91 kg)	Jr	LaPorte H. S.	LaPorte, Indiana
18	LHP	Justin Miller	L/L	5 ft 9 in (1.75 m)	180 lb (82 kg)	Fr	Homestead H. S.	Roanoke, Indiana
19	LHP	Spencer Strobel	L/L	6 ft 1 in (1.85 m)	195 lb (88 kg)	So	Avon H. S.	Avon, Indiana
20	RHP	Cameron Boyd	R/R	6 ft 3 in (1.91 m)	195 lb (88 kg)	Jr	Fishers H. S.	Fishers, Indiana
22	INF	Brandon Yoho	R/R	6 ft 1 in (1.85 m)	195 lb (88 kg)	Sr	Fishers H. S.	Fishers, Indiana
23	RHP	Grant Johnston	R/R	6 ft 1 in (1.85 m)	185 lb (84 kg)	Fr	Hamilton Southeastern H. S.	Fishers, Indiana
24	OF	Robert Young III	R/R	6 ft 2 in (1.88 m)	208 lb (94 kg)	RS Jr	North Central H. S.	Indianapolis, Indiana
25	RHP	Cade Willard	R/R	6 ft 1 in (1.85 m)	195 lb (88 kg)	RS Fr	Eastside H. S.	Butler, Indiana
26	OF	Austin Wilkie	R/R	6 ft 2 in (1.88 m)	200 lb (91 kg)	Fr	Mentor College	Mississauga, Ontario
27	OF	Jacob Dickson	R/R	6 ft 5 in (1.96 m)	205 lb (93 kg)	Jr	Portage H. S.	Portage, Indiana
31	RHP	Jarrett Miller	R/R	6 ft 1 in (1.85 m)	195 lb (88 kg)	RS Fr	Plymouth H. S.	Plymouth, Ohio
32	C	Alec Brunson	R/R	6 ft 2 in (1.88 m)	200 lb (91 kg)	Fr	DeKalb H. S.	Auburn, Indiana
33	RHP	Nathan Hefle	R/R	6 ft 0 in (1.83 m)	200 lb (91 kg)	So	Germantown H. S.	Germantown, Wisconsin
34	RHP	Drew Pyle	R/R	6 ft 3 in (1.91 m)	195 lb (88 kg)	Fr	Hagerstown H. S.	Economy, Indiana
35	RHP	Sean Ferguson	R/R	6 ft 4 in (1.93 m)	215 lb (98 kg)	So	Parkland College	New Haven, Indiana
36	RHP	Trevor Armstrong	L/R	6 ft 0 in (1.83 m)	170 lb (77 kg)	So	Snider H. S.	Fort Wayne, Indiana
37	RHP	Tyler Kissinger	R/R	6 ft 3 in (1.91 m)	215 lb (98 kg)	RS Jr	Florence–Darlington Technical College	Fort Wayne, Indiana
38	C	Andrew Lawvere	R/R	5 ft 10 in (1.78 m)	210 lb (95 kg)	RS So	Eastbrook H. S.	Upland, Indiana

Head coach

Bobby Pierce

Assistant coach(es)

Connor Lawhead

Pitching coach(es)

Grant Birley

Legend

- (C) Team captain
- (S) Suspended
- (I) Ineligible
- Injured
- Current redshirt

Roster
Last update: February 26, 2019

== Schedule ==
2019 Purdue Fort Wayne Mastodons baseball game log
Regular season
February (4–3)

#	Date	Opponent	Site/stadium	Score	Win	Loss	Save	Attendance	Overall record	Summit record
1	February 15	at Alabama A&M	Bulldog Field • Huntsville, Alabama	10–2	Phelps (1–0)	Diaz (0–1)	None	25	1–0	0–0
2	February 16	at Alabama A&M	Bulldog Field • Huntsville, Alabama	9–8	Kissinger (1–0)	Figueroa (0–1)	Ferguson (1)	25	2–0	0–0
3	February 16	at Alabama A&M	Bulldog Field • Huntsville, Alabama	5–4	Armstrong (1–0)	Mendoza (0–1)	Strobel (1)	25	3–0	0–0
4	February 17	at Alabama A&M	Bulldog Field • Huntsville, Alabama	6–5	Armstrong (2–0)	Caver (0–1)	Ferguson (2)	25	4–0	0–0
5	February 22	at Alabama State	Wheeler–Watkins Baseball Complex • Montgomery, Alabama	7–14	Wright (1–0)	Armstrong (2–1)	None	275	4–1	0–0
6	February 23	at Alabama State	Wheeler–Watkins Baseball Complex • Montgomery, Alabama	1–7	Kelly (1–0)	Boyd (0–1)	None	181	4–2	0–0
7	February 24	at Alabama State	Wheeler–Watkins Baseball Complex • Montgomery, Alabama	9–10	Rivera (1–0)	Ju. Miller (0–1)	None	109	4–3	0–0

March (0–17)

#	Date	Opponent	Site/stadium	Score	Win	Loss	Save	Attendance	Overall record	Summit record
8	March 1	at Southeast Missouri State	Capaha Field • Cape Girardeau, Missouri	4–12	Dodd (1–1)	Phelps (1–1)	None	233	4–4	0–0
9	March 2	at Southeast Missouri State	Capaha Field • Cape Girardeau, Missouri	1–10	Niznik (2–0)	Boyd (0–2)	None	278	4–5	0–0
10	March 3	at Southeast Missouri State	Capaha Field • Cape Girardeau, Missouri	1–14	Bergtholdt (2–0)	Odzark (0–1)	None	278	4–6	0–0
11	March 7	at Dayton	Woerner Field • Dayton, Ohio,	3–9	Wagner (1–0)	Ju. Miller (0–2)	None	48	4–7	0–0
12	March 9	vs Butler	Bill Aker Baseball Complex • Highland Heights, Kentucky,	1–7	Pepiot (1–1)	Boyd (0–3)	None	52	4–8	0–0
13	March 10	vs Butler	Bill Aker Baseball Complex • Highland Heights, Kentucky	3–18	Hubbe (2–0)	Phelps (1–2)	None	108	4–9	0–0
14	March 10	vs Butler	Bill Aker Baseball Complex • Highland Heights, Kentucky	0–16	Schultz (3–0)	Odzark (0–2)	None	74	4–10	0–0
15	March 12	at Ball State	Ball Diamond • Muncie, Indiana	6–11	Floyd (3–0)	Armstrong (2–1)	None	333	4–11	0–0
16	March 15	at Oral Roberts	J. L. Johnson Stadium • Tulsa, Oklahoma	3–13	McMinn (3–2)	Boyd (0–4)	None	617	4–12	0–1
17	March 16	at Oral Roberts	J. L. Johnson Stadium • Tulsa, Oklahoma	4–20	Gaskins (2–1)	Phelps (1–3)	None	684	4–13	0–2
18	March 17	at Oral Roberts	J. L. Johnson Stadium • Tulsa, Oklahoma	5–7	Rainwater (1–0)	Odzark (0–3)	Henson (1)	663	4–14	0–3
19	March 20	at Ball State	Ball Diamond • Muncie, Indiana	11–12	McGill (1–0)	Kissinger (1–1)	None	222	4–15	0–3
20	March 22	at Omaha	Skutt Catholic High School • Omaha, Nebraska,	4–11	Machado (3–1)	Boyd (0–5)	Daugherty (5)	176	4–16	0–4
21	March 23	at Omaha	Creighton Preparatory School • Omaha, Nebraska	1–6	Kinney (5–0)	Phelps (1–4)	None	188	4–17	0–5
22	March 24	at Omaha	Creighton Preparatory School • Omaha, Nebraska	0–26	Koelewyn (3–1)	Odzark (0–4)	None	176	4–18	0–6
23	March 28	Anderson	Mastodon Field • Fort Wayne, Indiana	Cancelled	–	–	–	–	–	–
24	March 29	South Dakota State	Mastodon Field • Fort Wayne, Indiana	4–5	Barnett (4–0)	Kissinger (1–2)	Beazley (3)	110	4–19	0–7
25	March 29	South Dakota State	Mastodon Field • Fort Wayne, Indiana	2–12	Froom (3–1)	Phelps (1–5)	None	111	4–20	0–8
26	March 31	South Dakota State	Frank Eck Stadium • Notre Dame, Indiana	0–8	McCay (4–1)	Odzark (0–5)	None	33	4–21	0–9

April (1–13)

#	Date	Opponent	Site/stadium	Score	Win	Loss	Save	Attendance	Overall record	Summit record
27	April 2	Goshen	Mastodon Field • Fort Wayne, Indiana	11–9	Kissinger (2–2)	Fox (1–2)	Phelps (1)	83	5–21	0–9
28	April 5	at North Dakota State	Newman Outdoor Field • Fargo, North Dakota	8–17	Harm (3–1)	Boyd (0–6)	None	110	5–22	0–10
29	April 6	at North Dakota State	Newman Outdoor Field • Fargo, North Dakota	4–5	Harms (1–0)	Hill (0–1)	None	110	5–23	0–11
30	April 7	at North Dakota State	Newman Outdoor Field • Fargo, North Dakota	0–7	Smith (2–2)	Odzark (0–6)	None	110	5–24	0–12
31	April 10	Bowling Green	Mastodon Field • Fort Wayne, Indiana	4–10	Buratto (2–0)	Armstrong (2–2)	Spezia (4)	101	5–25	0–12
32	April 12	at Western Illinois	Alfred D. Boyer Stadium • Macomb, Illinois,	4–14	Warkentien (2–2)	Boyd (0–7)	None	129	5–26	0–13
33	April 13	at Western Illinois	Alfred D. Boyer Stadium • Macomb, Illinois	2–4	Drake (4–3)	Phelps (1–6)	Foy (1)	146	5–27	0–14
34	April 13	at Western Illinois	Alfred D. Boyer Stadium • Macomb, Illinois	0–10	Carberry (5–1)	Ju. Miller (0–3)	None	129	5–28	0–15
35	April 17	Toledo	Mastodon Field • Fort Wayne, Indiana	7–11	Calopietro (2–0)	Kissinger (2–3)	None	121	5–29	0–15
36	April 19	Omaha	Mastodon Field • Fort Wayne, Indiana	0–5	Machado (5–1)	Boyd (0–8)	None	83	5–30	0–16
37	April 21	Omaha	Mastodon Field • Fort Wayne, Indiana	2–13	Kinney (8–0)	Phelps (1–7)	None	204	5–31	0–17
38	April 21	Omaha	Mastodon Field • Fort Wayne, Indiana	2–4	Koelewyn (4–1)	Ju. Miller (0–4)	Hehnke (5)	211	5–32	0–18
39	April 24	at Purdue	Alexander Field • West Lafayette, Indiana	2–11	P. J. Smith (4–3)	Odzark (0–7)	None	1,370	5–33	0–18
40	April 26	Oral Roberts	Mastodon Field • Fort Wayne, Indiana	2–25	McMinn (6–3)	Boyd (0–9)	None	102	5–34	0–19
41	April 27	Oral Roberts	Mastodon Field • Fort Wayne, Indiana	0–10	Gaskins (3–3)	Kissinger (2–4)	None	115	5–35	0–20
42	April 28	Oral Roberts	Mastodon Field • Fort Wayne, Indiana	0–14	Coffey (2–2)	Ju. Miller (0–5)	None	115	5–36	0–21
43	April 30	Butler	Mastodon Field • Fort Wayne, Indiana	Cancelled	–	–	–	–	–	–

May (2–9)

#	Date	Opponent	Site/stadium	Score	Win	Loss	Save	Attendance	Overall record	Summit record
44	May 3	at South Dakota State	Erv Huether Field • Brookings, South Dakota	0–8	Olmstead (4–3)	Boyd (0–10)	None	204	5–37	0–22
45	May 4	at South Dakota State	Erv Huether Field • Brookings, South Dakota	4–7	Barnett (5–1)	Phelps (1–8)	None	246	5–38	0–23
46	May 5	at South Dakota State	Erv Huether Field • Brookings, South Dakota	2–12	McCay (5–1)	Ju. Miller (0–6)	None	159	5–39	0–24
47	May 7	at Bowling Green	Steller Field • Bowling Green, Ohio,	1–3	Egnor (1–4)	Odzark (0–8)	Speiza (5)	157	5–40	0–24
48	May 10	North Dakota State	Mastodon Field • Fort Wayne, Indiana	6–5	Armstrong (3–2)	Harm (4–5)	D. Miller (1)	107	6–40	1–24
49	May 11	North Dakota State	Mastodon Field • Fort Wayne, Indiana	7–20	Smith (4–2)	Boyd (0–11)	None	106	6–41	1–25
50	May 12	North Dakota State	Mastodon Field • Fort Wayne, Indiana	9–11	Tritch (1–0)	Kissinger (2–5)	Harms (2)	145	6–42	1–26
51	May 14	at Toledo	Scott Park Baseball Complex • Toledo, Ohio,	8–13	Davis (2–2)	Odzark (0–9)	None	170	6–43	1–26
52	May 16	Western Illinois	Mastodon Field • Fort Wayne, Indiana	8–6	D. Miller (1–0)	Emanuel (2–3)	None	146	7–43	2–26
53	May 17	Western Illinois	Mastodon Field • Fort Wayne, Indiana	1–4	Drake (7–5)	Boyd (0–12)	Rektorski (1)	189	7–44	2–27
54	May 18	Western Illinois	Mastodon Field • Fort Wayne, Indiana	3–13	Dorethy (2–4)	Ju. Miller (0–7)	None	202	7–45	2–28

== See also ==
- 2019 Summit League baseball tournament
- 2019 NCAA Division I baseball tournament
