= Lorain County Leviathan FC =

Soccer club in Avon, Ohio

Lorain County Leviathan
- Full name: Lorain County Leviathan Football Club
- Founded: 2025 (1 year ago)
- Stadium: ForeFront Field; Avon, Ohio
- Coach: Blake New
- League: USL League Two
- 2026: n/a
- Website: loraincountyleviathanfc.com

Lorain County Leviathan Football Club is a semi-professional men's soccer club based in Lorain County, Ohio. The team was founded in 2025 and is led by an ownership group headed by Andrew McDonnell with the infrastructure run by the staff of the Lake Erie Crushers, a minor league baseball team that plays in the Frontier League.

It is set to begin play in 2026 as a member of USL League Two, an amateur league in the United States soccer league system, and home games will be played at ForeFront Field in Avon, sharing a home with the Crushers.

== History ==
On August 23, 2025, it was reported that North Ridgeville resident Andrew McDonnell (an ownership partner in Akron City FC) was heading up an ownership group that was in talks to start a USL League Two franchise for Lorain County to begin playing at the then-Crushers Stadium for the 2026 season., with an agreement reportedly being reached two days later.

On November 12, 2025, USL League Two officially announced the new Lorain County team would be joining the league for the 2026 season as part of its Great Forest Division and play its home games at the now-ForeFront Field. On November 24, 2025, Oberlin College men's soccer head coach Blake New was announced as the new team's inaugural head coach.

A name-the-team contest was held between four finalists (with crests readily made for each option), those finalists being Lorain County Blast FC, Lorain County FC, Lorain County Leviathan FC and Lorain County Quarrymen FC. Fan voting was held until December 1, with the Leviathan name and crest announced as the winner on December 9.

In March 2026, Lorain County Leviathan entered a commercial affiliation partnership with Scottish League One side, Inverness Caledonian Thistle.

== Stadium ==
The club plays their home matches at ForeFront Field, a 5,000-seat stadium in Avon with an artificial turf surface which opened in 2009. In addition to Leviathan FC, ForeFront Field is home of the Lake Erie Crushers independent baseball team in the Frontier League, an MLB Partner League.

== Club culture ==
=== Colors and crest ===
The team's colors are dark blue, light blue, teal (in two shades) and yellow. Though the name was inspired by the Great Lakes' various sea monsters (including Bessie, the Lake Erie monster which is also the namesake of the Cleveland Monsters hockey team), the mascot is an original leviathan character named Jack Nolan.

== Players ==
As of June 24, 2026

Note: Flags indicate national team as defined under FIFA eligibility rules; some limited exceptions apply. Players may hold more than one non-FIFA nationality.

No.	Pos.	Nation	Player
1	GK	USA	Zoltan Nagy
2	DF	USA	Drew Kapsak
2	DF	ARG	Santiago Maiolo
3	FW	SRB	Stefan Velickovic
4	MF	IRL	Davy Leavey
5	DF	USA	Martin McLaughlin
6	DF	BAH	Jordan Cheetham
7	MF	USA	Marco Valentic
8	MF	USA	Marko Odorcic
9	FW/MF	USA	Domenic Ruggiero
10	FW	USA	Dakota Jonke
11	FW	COD	Espoir Mayele
12	DF	USA	Ahmad Hijaz
13	MF	USA	Valentino Cruzado
15	DF	USA	Chase Duldner
14	FW	HUN	Tamás Nagy
15	DF	USA	Nathan Gray
16	DF	USA	Adam Johnson
23	DF	USA	Adam Kalvitz
17	MF	USA	Justin Shreffler

No.	Pos.	Nation	Player
18	FW	USA	Brendan Sheehan
19	FW	ENG	Sam Brittain
—	MF	USA	Nolan Spicer
—	MF	HAI	Stephen Forges
—	DF	JPN	Yoshichika Kainuma
—	DF	USA	Andrew Portis
11	MF	USA	Angel Murillo
12	MF	USA	Max Johnson
18	FW	USA	Brendan Sheehan
20	DF	KOR	Sam Nam
21	MF	USA	Nathan Trickett
21	FW	USA	Kelly Janssen
22	DF/MF	USA	Noah Handzel
23	MF	ENG	Nial McClintock
24	FW	GER	Alex de Nittis
25	MF	USA	Carter Hancock
26	MF	ENG	London Carnie
—	MF	USA	Sam Trivisonno
33	GK	USA	Stephen Yerian
33	DF	USA	Owen Szucs
33	GK	USA	Patrick McLaughlin
