= Kyle Hallock =

American baseball player and coach

Current position
- Title: Head Coach
- Team: Bowling Green
- Conference: MAC
- Record: 143–171

Biographical details
- Born: August 6, 1988 (age 38); Sandusky, Ohio, U.S.

Playing career
- 2008–2011: Kent State
- 2011: Tri-City ValleyCats
- 2012: Lexington Legends
- 2012: Gulf Coast League Astros
- 2013: Quad Cities River Bandits
- 2013: Oklahoma City RedHawks
- 2013: Lancaster JetHawks
- 2013: Corpus Christi Hooks
- Position: Pitcher

Coaching career (HC unless noted)
- 2015–2018: Malone (P)
- 2019–2020: Bowling Green (P)
- 2021–present: Bowling Green

Head coaching record
- Overall: 143–171

Accomplishments and honors

Championships
- MAC Regular Season (2024)

Awards
- MAC Coach of the Year (2024); NYP Mid-Season All-Star (2011); MAC Pitcher of the Year (2011)

Kyle Hallock (born August 6, 1988) is an American baseball coach and former pitcher, who is the current head baseball coach of the Bowling Green Falcons. He played college baseball and won four Mid-American Conference championships at Kent State for coach Scott Stricklin from 2008 to 2011 before advancing to the AAA level professionally with the Houston Astros during his career from 2011-2014.

== Playing career ==
Hallock attended Perkins High School in Sandusky, Ohio, where he earned 11 varsity letters in baseball, basketball, football and golf. He was named All Ohio in both basketball and baseball during his junior and senior years. In 2018, Hallock was inducted as an inaugural member of the Perkins High School Athletic Hall of Fame. Upon graduation in 2007, Hallock was recruited to play baseball at Kent State, where he would pitch on scholarship. Hallock was drafted in the 49th round of the 2010 Major League Baseball draft by the Philadelphia Phillies, but he declined signing and returned to Kent State. As a senior in 2011, Hallock pitched himself to the Mid-American Conference Baseball Pitcher of the Year Award. Hallock was then drafted in the 10th round of the 2011 Major League Baseball draft by the Houston Astros.

In 2011, Hallock played for the Class A Short Season Tri-City ValleyCats. He posted a 3–4 record for the Cats while holding a 2.63 earned run average over 61 2/3 innings pitched. His played earned him NYP Mid-Season All-Star and MiLB.com Organization All-Star. In 2012, Hallock split the time between the Class A Lexington Legends and Rookie league GCL Astros. He held a combined record 1–3 over 30 2/3 innings pitched. In 2013, Hallock started the season in Class A with the Quad City River Bandits where he would appear in just one game before being promoted to the Triple-A Oklahoma City RedHawks. For the RedHawks, Hallock had a 1–0 record in nine appearances and a 3.72 earned run average over 19 1/3 innings pitched. Hallock would then finish the season between the Class A-Advanced Lancaster JetHawks and Class AA Corpus Christi Hooks. Over three affiliated seasons, Hallock threw 188 2/3 innings and struck out 138 batters while holding a 9–13 record.

== Coaching career ==
In 2014, Hallock served as assistant coach of the Yarmouth–Dennis Red Sox, a collegiate summer baseball team in the Cape Cod Baseball League. In the fall of 2014, Hallock was named the pitching coach at Malone University. In the fall of 2018, Hallock was named the pitching coach at Bowling Green State University. On June 3, 2020, Danny Schmitz stepped down as the head baseball coach at Bowling Green, and Hallock was promoted to interim head coach. In 2021, Hallock was the youngest head coach in the country during his first season at the helm. In 2022, Hallock coached the Falcons to a win over Michigan State, the program's first win against a Power 5 opponent since 2014. In 2023, the Falcons defeated No.5 ranked Louisville for their first top five victory in program history. On May 12, 2024, Bowling Green defeated Eastern Michigan 8–6, which secured their first regular season championship since the 2009 season. The 13 game win improvement earned Hallock MAC Coach of the Year honors. He is also the first individual in MAC History to be named MAC Player of the Year as a student-athlete and MAC Coach of the Year as a head coach.

=== Head coaching record ===
Record table
Season	Team	Overall	Conference	Standing	Postseason
Bowling Green Falcons (Mid-American Conference) (2021–present)
2021	Bowling Green	20–30	18–22	T–7th	
2022	Bowling Green	18–34	14–24	9th	
2023	Bowling Green	20–30	13–17	T–7th	
2024	Bowling Green	33–20	24–6	1st	MAC tournament
2025	Bowling Green	33–22	19–11	4th	MAC tournament
2026	Bowling Green	19-35	12-22	10th	
Bowling Green:		143–171 (.455)	100–102 (.495)		
Total:		143–171 (.455)			
National champion Postseason invitational champion Conference regular season champion Conference regular season and conference tournament champion Division regular season champion Division regular season and conference tournament champion Conference tournament champion

== See also ==
- Career statistics from Baseball Reference (Minors)
