= Bobby Pierce (baseball coach, born 1978) =

American baseball coach and player (born 1978)

Biographical details
- Born: October 17, 1978 (age 48)

Playing career
- 1998: UNLV
- 1999: Central Arizona
- 2000–2001: New Mexico State

Coaching career (HC unless noted)
- 2003: Central Arizona (assistant)
- 2004–2006: Arkansas–Little Rock (assistant)
- 2007–2008: Metro State
- 2009–2019: Purdue Fort Wayne

Head coaching record
- Overall: 243–444
- Tournaments: Summit: 4–6; NCAA: 0–0

Robert Fitzroy Pierce (born October 17, 1978) is an American baseball coach and former player. He most recently served as head coach of the Purdue University Fort Wayne from the 2009 season to 2019. He played at UNLV, Central Arizona, and New Mexico State. With Central Arizona, he played in the 1999 JUCO World Series. He began his coaching career as an assistant with Central Arizona for one season before becoming an assistant at Arkansas–Little Rock. Two seasons later, he became head coach at NCAA Division II Metro State before accepting the same job at IPFW. On July 3, 2019, Pierce stepped down as the head coach at Purdue Fort Wayne.

== Head coaching record ==
Record table
Season	Team	Overall	Conference	Standing	Postseason
Metro State Roadrunners (Rocky Mountain Athletic Conference) (2007–2008)
2007	Metro State	17–35	13–24	3rd (Mountain)	Rocky Mountain Athletic Tournament
2008	Metro State	38–19	30–10	2nd (Mountain)	Rocky Mountain Athletic Tournament
Metro State:		55–54	43–34		
IPFW/Fort Wayne/Purdue Fort Wayne Mastodons (Summit League) (2009–2019)
2009	IPFW	13–38	6–21	8th	
2010	IPFW	17–38	13–15	5th	
2011	IPFW	17–34	12–16	5th	
2012	IPFW	16–40	8–16	5th	
2013	IPFW	22–32	9–21	6th	
2014	IPFW	19–36	11–13	4th	Summit League Tournament
2015	IPFW	25–23	12–15	3rd	Summit League Tournament
2016	IPFW	33–26	14–16	3rd	Summit League Tournament
2017	Fort Wayne	9–43	4–26	6th	
2018	Fort Wayne	10–35	6–21	6th	
2019	Purdue Fort Wayne	7–45	2–28	6th	
IPFW/Fort Wayne/Purdue Fort Wayne:		188–390	97–208		
Total:		243–444			
National champion Postseason invitational champion Conference regular season champion Conference regular season and conference tournament champion Division regular season champion Division regular season and conference tournament champion Conference tournament champion
