= Joey Murray =

American baseball player (born 1996)

- Pitcher
- Born: September 23, 1996 (age 28); Dublin, Ohio, U.S.
- Bats: Left Throws: Right

Joseph Murray (born September 23, 1996) is an American former professional baseball pitcher.

== Amateur career ==
Murray attended Dublin Coffman High School in his hometown of Dublin, Ohio. Undrafted out of high school, he then attended Kent State University, playing three seasons for the Golden Flashes. In his freshman season, Murray pitched to a 2–1 win–loss record, 3.69 earned run average (ERA), and 57 strikeouts in 39 innings pitched. In the summer, Murray played for the Keene Swamp Bats of the New England Collegiate Baseball League. As a sophomore in 2017, he went 6–1 with a 1.80 ERA and 110 strikeouts in 75 innings, and in the summer played for the Cape Cod League's Orleans Firebirds, where he was named a league all-star. In his third and final season with the Golden Flashes, Murray posted a 9–2 record with a 2.45 ERA and 141 strikeouts in 95 2/3 innings. He was named the Mid-American Conference Baseball Pitcher of the Year in both 2017 and 2018.

== Professional career ==
=== Toronto Blue Jays ===
Murray was selected by the Toronto Blue Jays in the eighth round, with the 236th overall selection, of the 2018 Major League Baseball draft. He signed for the full draft-slot bonus of $169,600 and was assigned to the Low-A Vancouver Canadians. In 25 2/3 innings, Murray went 1–1 with a 1.75 ERA and 39 strikeouts. Murray began the 2019 season with the Single-A Lansing Lugnuts, and later earned promotions to the High-A Dunedin Blue Jays and Double-A New Hampshire Fisher Cats. He posted a combined 10–7 record with a 2.75 ERA. His 169 strikeouts led the entire Blue Jays organization. Murray did not play in a game in 2020 due to the cancellation of the minor league season because of the COVID-19 pandemic.

He returned to action in 2021, but made only one appearance for the rookie–level Florida Complex League Blue Jays before missing the remainder of the season with an elbow strain. In 2022, he made 5 appearances (4 starts) for Double–A New Hampshire, posting a 7.84 ERA with 23 strikeouts in 20 2/3 innings pitched. Murray underwent Tommy John surgery in May 2022, ending his season. On July 25, 2023, he was activated from the injured list and assigned to Single–A Dunedin. However, on July 29, Murray was released by the Blue Jays organization.

=== Sioux City Explorers ===
On May 2, 2024, Murray signed with the Sioux City Explorers of the American Association of Professional Baseball. In 19 starts for the Explorers, he posted a 5-8 record and 5.94 ERA with 86 strikeouts over 94 innings of work.

On April 24, 2025, Murray re-signed with Sioux City. In four starts for Sioux City, he logged a 1-1 record and 6.88 ERA with 16 strikeouts over 17 innings of work. Murray was released by the Explorers on June 1.

On September 11, 2025, Murray announced his retirement from professional baseball via Instagram.
