= Billy Gernon =

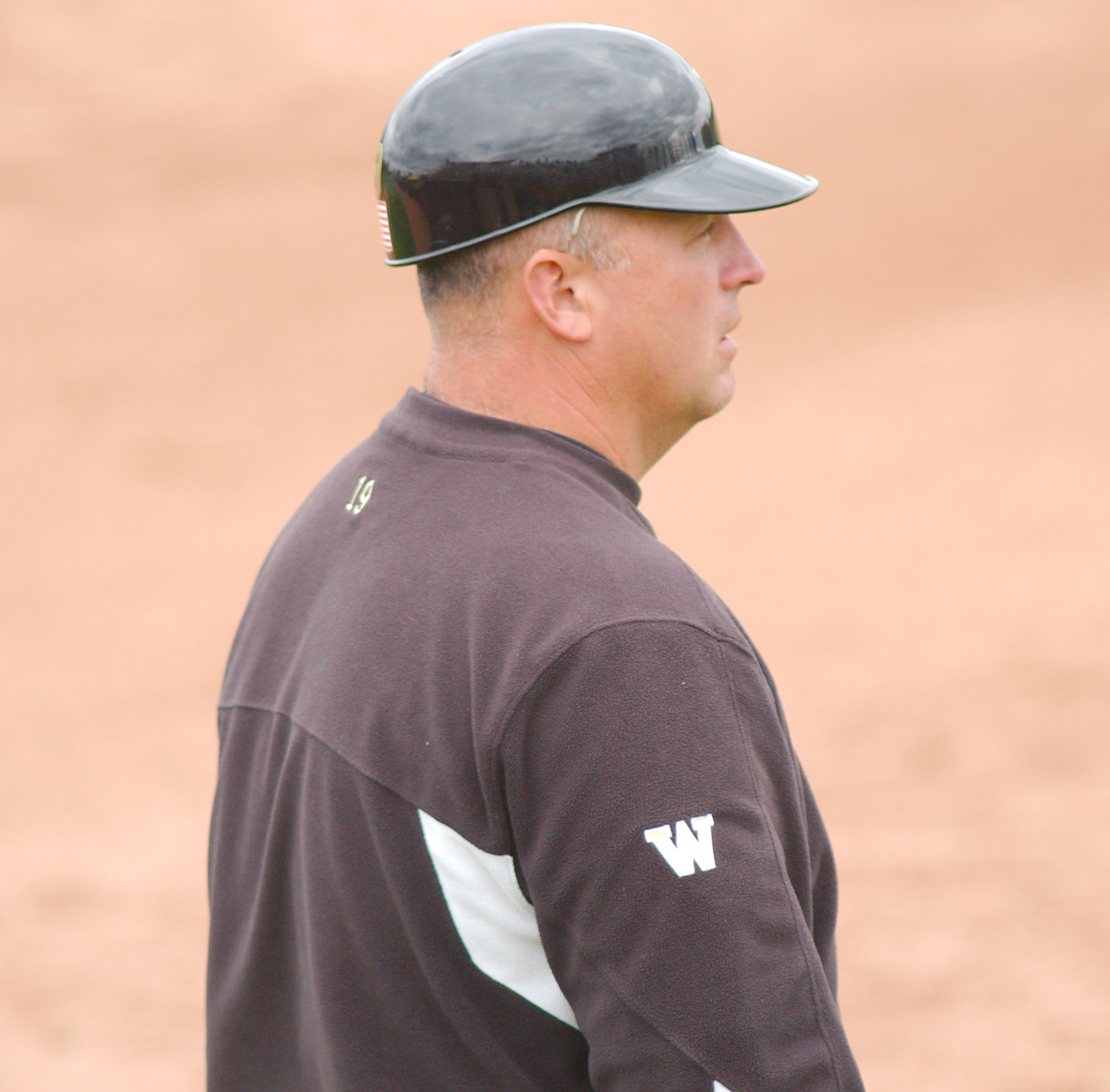
- Gernon with Western Michigan in 2014

Current position
- Title: Head coach
- Team: Western Michigan
- Conference: Mid-American
- Record: 324–432

Biographical details
- Born: 1966 or 1967 (age 59–60)

Playing career
- 1986–1988: Indiana–Southeast
- 1990: Indiana

Coaching career (HC unless noted)
- 1996: Indiana (Asst.)
- 1997–1998: IPFW (Asst.)
- 2000–2008: IPFW
- 2009–2010: Michigan State (Asst.)
- 2011–present: Western Michigan

Head coaching record
- Overall: 480–699–3
- Tournaments: MAC: 3–8; NCAA: 0–4

Accomplishments and honors

Championships
- MAC tournament (2024)

Billy Gernon is an American college baseball coach, currently serving as head coach of the Western Michigan Broncos baseball team. He was named to that position prior to the 2011 season. He previously served as head coach of the IPFW Mastodons baseball team during their transition from Division II to Division I.

Gernon played three seasons at Indiana–Southeast before transferring to Indiana for his final season. In his senior season, he served as the Hoosiers closer. He later served as a student assistant coach with the Hoosiers. During that 1996 season, Indiana claimed the Big Ten baseball tournament championship and earned a berth in the 1996 NCAA Division I baseball tournament. He then served two seasons as pitching coach at IPFW while completing an education degree. He became head coach of the Mastodons prior to the 2000 season. Gernon guided the team from Division II to Division I and entry into The Summit League in 2008. He then served two seasons as an assistant at Michigan State before earning the head coaching job at Western Michigan.

== Head coaching record ==
Record table
Season	Team	Overall	Conference	Standing	Postseason
IPFW Mastodons (D2) (Great Lakes Valley Conference) (2000–2001)
2000	IPFW	21–25	12–15	5th (North)	
2001	IPFW	11–34–1	6–22	6th (North)	
IPFW (DII):		32–59–1	18–37		
IPFW Mastodons (DI) (Independent) (2002–2007)
2002	IPFW	19–24			
2003	IPFW	17–31–1			
2004	IPFW	20–28			
2005	IPFW	24–24			
2006	IPFW	21–28			
2007	IPFW	9–37			
IPFW Mastodons (Summit League) (2008)
2008	IPFW	14–36–1	10–17	6th	
IPFW (DI):		124–208–2	10–17		
IPFW (total):		156–267–3			
Western Michigan Broncos (Mid-American Conference) (2011–present)
2011	Western Michigan	26–31	12–14	5th (West)	MAC tournament (Note: The two division winners and next six best finishers, regardless of division, qualified for the Tournament in 2011. 12 teams competed in the MAC.)
2012	Western Michigan	26–29	14–12	3rd (West)	MAC tournament (Note: The two division winners and next six best finishers, regardless of division, qualified for the Tournament in 2011. 12 teams competed in the MAC.)
2013	Western Michigan	16–38	8–19	6th (West)	
2014	Western Michigan	24–31	11–16	3rd (West)	
2015	Western Michigan	22–30	13–14	4th (West)	
2016	Western Michigan	22–34	11–13	5th (West)	NCAA Regional
2017	Western Michigan	24–29	12–12	4th (West)	MAC tournament
2018	Western Michigan	23–25	12–13	7th	
2019	Western Michigan	18–31	11–14	7th	
2020	Western Michigan	9–6	0–0		Season canceled due to COVID-19
2021	Western Michigan	24–26	23–17	T-3rd	
2022	Western Michigan	18–36	15–24	8th	
2023	Western Michigan	21–31	18–11	4th (West)	MAC tournament
2024	Western Michigan	32–23	19–11	2nd	NCAA Regional
2025	Western Michigan	19–32	12–18	T–6th	
Western Michigan:		324–432	191–208		
Total:		480–699–3			
National champion Postseason invitational champion Conference regular season champion Conference regular season and conference tournament champion Division regular season champion Division regular season and conference tournament champion Conference tournament champion

== See also ==
- List of current NCAA Division I baseball coaches
