= Mid-American Conference Baseball Pitcher of the Year =

College sports award

- Awarded for: the most outstanding baseball pitcher in the Mid-American Conference
- Country: United States
- First award: 1988
- Currently held by: Nathan Leininger, Toledo

The Mid-American Conference Baseball Pitcher of the Year is an annual award given to the most outstanding baseball pitcher in the Mid-American Conference. The award was first given after the 1988 season. Kent State players have won the award almost twice as many times as players from any other school.

== Winners ==
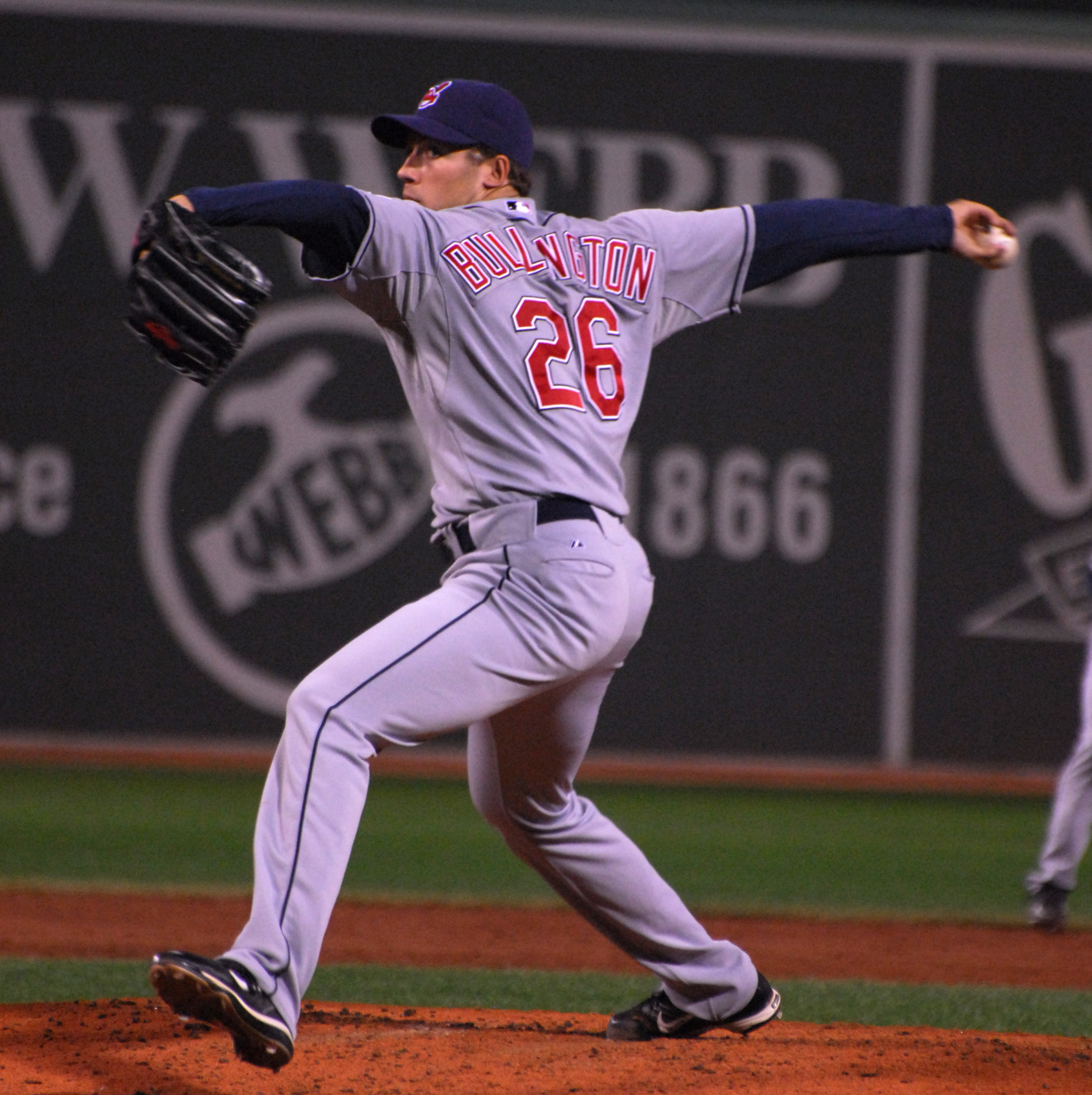
Bryan Bullington was the second pitcher to win the award twice

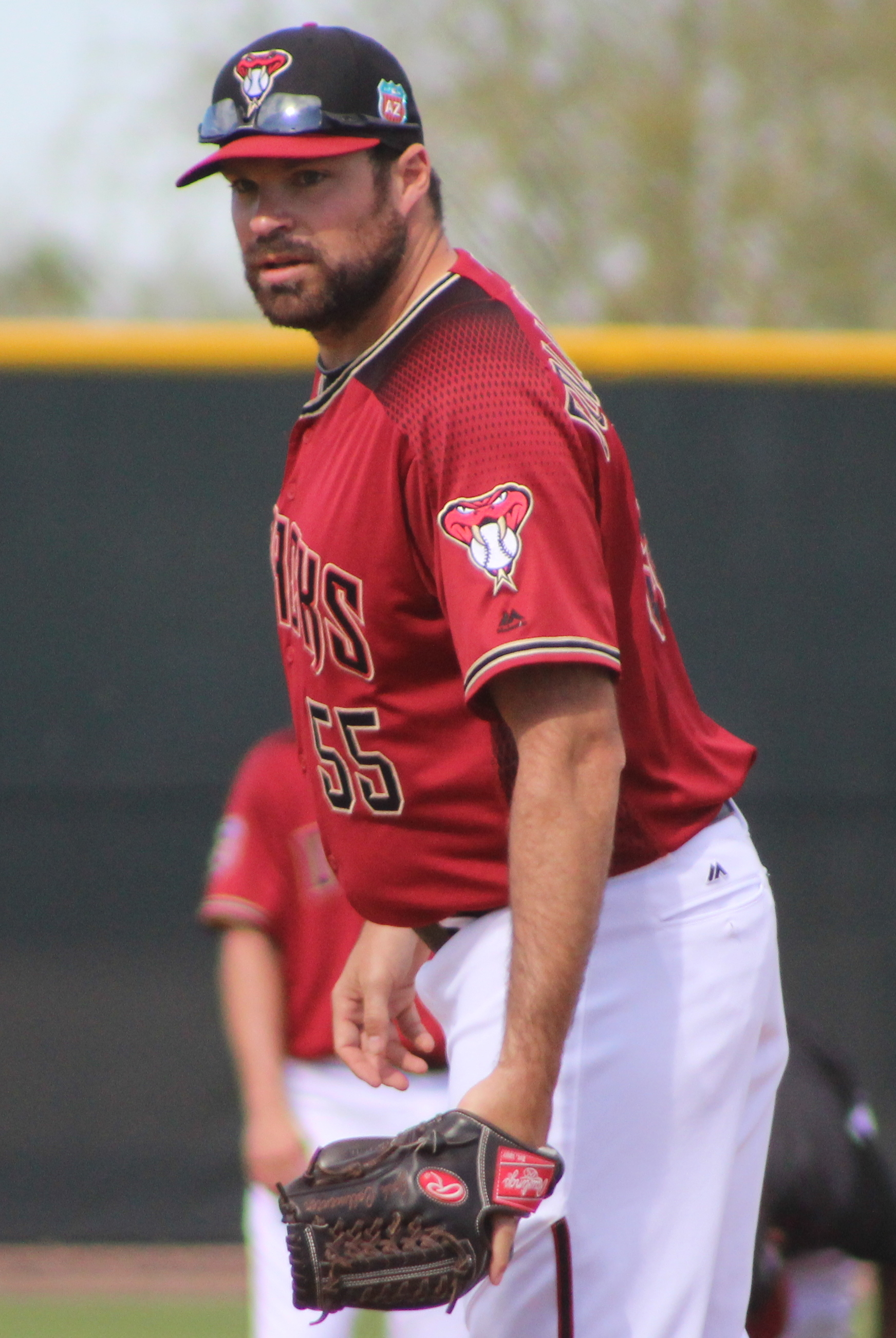
Josh Collmenter was the first Central Michigan pitcher to win the award in 19 years, ending the longest drought between victories for any school

Season	Player	School	Reference
1988	Tim McDonald	Central Michigan	
1989	Doug Marcero	Western Michigan	
1990	Brian Schubert	Kent State	
1991	Doug Martin	Eastern Michigan	
1992	Bill Underwood	Kent State	
1993	Mike Nartker	Kent State	
1994	Travis Miller	Kent State	
1995	Mike Nartker (2)	Kent State	
1995	Brian Sikorski	Western Michigan	
1996	Ted Rose	Kent State	
1997	Andy Smith	Bowling Green	
1998	Jeff Hundley	Bowling Green	
1999	Jeremy Griffiths	Toledo	
2000	Tony Schiml	Ohio	
2001	Bryan Bullington	Ball State	
2002	Bryan Bullington (2)	Ball State	
2003	Dirk Hayhurst	Kent State	
2004	Ryan Ford	Eastern Michigan	
2005	Erik Morrison	Ball State	
2006	Jeff Fischer	Eastern Michigan	
2007	Josh Collmenter	Central Michigan	
2008	Chris Carpenter	Kent State	
2009	Brennan Smith	Bowling Green	
2010	Jesse Hernandez	Central Michigan	
2011	Kyle Hallock	Kent State	
2012	David Starn	Kent State	
2013	Scott Baker	Ball State	
2014	Seth Varner	Miami	
2015	Logan Cozart	Ohio	
2016	Eric Lauer	Kent State	
2017	Joey Murray	Kent State	
2018	Joey Murray (2)	Kent State	
2019	Drey Jameson	Ball State	
2021	Andrew Taylor	Central Michigan	
2022	Tyler Schweitzer	Ball State	
2023	Joe Whitman	Kent State	
2024	Merritt Beeker	Ball State	
2025	Cooper Katskee	Miami	
2026	Nathan Leininger	Toledo	

== Winners by school ==
School (year joined)	Winners	Years
Kent State (1951)	13	1990, 1992–95, 1996, 2003, 2008, 2011–12, 2016–18, 2023
Ball State (1973)	7	2001–02, 2005, 2013, 2019, 2022, 2024
Central Michigan (1972)	4	1988, 2007, 2010, 2021
Bowling Green (1952)	3	1997–98, 2009
Eastern Michigan (1972)	3	1991, 2004, 2006
Miami (1948)	2	2014, 2025
Ohio (1947)	2	2000, 2015
Toledo (1951)	2	1999, 2026
Western Michigan (1948)	2	1989, 1995
Akron (1992)	0	—
Buffalo (1999)^{[a]}	0	—
Marshall (1954/1997)^{[b]}	0	—
Northern Illinois (1973/1997)^{[c]}	0	—

- ^{a} Buffalo discontinued its baseball program after the 2017 season.
- ^{b} Marshall was a member from 1954 to 1969 and then again from 1997 until 2005.
- ^{c} Northern Illinois was a member from 1973 to 1986, then left until 1997.

== See also ==
- Mid-American Conference Baseball Player of the Year
