= 2025 Mid-American Conference baseball tournament =

American collegiate baseball tournament

- Teams: 6
- Format: Double-elimination
- Finals site: Crushers Stadium; Avon, Ohio
- Champions: Miami (OH) (4th title)
- Winning coach: Brian Smiley (1st title)
- MVP: Dom Krupinski (Miami)
- Television: ESPN+

2025 Mid-American Conference baseball standings
	Conf.				Overall
Team	W		L	PCT	W		L	PCT
Kent State ‍†‍‍	23	–	7	.767	38	–	18	.679
Miami (OH) ‍‍‡‍^{y}	23	–	7	.767	35	–	23	.603
Ball State ‍‍‍	21	–	9	.700	36	–	22	.621
Bowling Green ‍‍‍	19	–	11	.633	33	–	22	.600
Toledo ‍‍‍	17	–	13	.567	32	–	29	.525
Eastern Michigan ‍‍‍	12	–	18	.400	21	–	30	.412
Western Michigan ‍‍‍	12	–	18	.400	19	–	32	.373
Central Michigan ‍‍‍	11	–	19	.367	20	–	35	.364
Northern Illinois ‍‍‍	9	–	21	.300	21	–	33	.389
Akron ‍‍‍	9	–	21	.300	20	–	34	.370
Ohio ‍‍‍	9	–	21	.300	14	–	37	.275
† – Conference champion ‡ – Tournament champion y – Invited to the NCAA Tournament; As of May 31, 2025; Rankings from D1Baseball

The 2025 Mid-American Conference baseball tournament was the postseason baseball tournament for the Mid-American Conference for the 2025 NCAA Division I baseball season, held from May 21–25 at Crushers Stadium in Avon, Ohio. Miami earned the conference's automatic bid to the 2025 NCAA Division I baseball tournament.

== Seeding and format ==
The top six finishers of the league's eleven teams qualify for the double-elimination tournament. Teams are seeded based on conference winning percentage, with the first tiebreaker being head-to-head record.

== Bracket ==
Upper round 1	Upper round 2	Upper final	Final
1	Miami OH	10
3	Ball State	6	5	Toledo	4
6	Eastern Michigan	5	1	Miami OH	6
2	Kent State	1
2	Kent State	9
4	Bowling Green	12	3	Ball State	8
5	Toledo	14
1	Miami OH	6	−
5	Toledo	3	−
Lower round 1	Lower round 2	Lower round 3	Lower final
2	Kent State	2
3	Ball State	10	5	Toledo	6
6	Eastern Michigan	2	5	Toledo	13
6	Eastern Michigan	10^{10}	5	Toledo	6
4	Bowling Green	7

== Schedule ==
Game	Time*	Matchup^{#}	Score	Notes	Reference
Wednesday, May 21
1	12:30 pm	No. 6 Eastern Michigan vs No. 3 Ball State	5−6		
Thursday, May 22
2	9:00 am	No. 5 Toledo vs No. 4 Bowling Green	14−12		
3	8:10 pm	No. 6 Eastern Michigan vs No. 4 Bowling Green	10–7^{(10)}	Bowling Green Eliminated	
Friday, May 23
4	10:00 am	No. 5 Toledo vs No. 1 Miami Ohio	4–10		
5	2:00 pm	No. 3 Ball State vs No. 2 Kent State	8−9		
6	6:00 pm	No. 6 Eastern Michigan vs No. 5 Toledo	2−6	Eastern Michigan Eliminated	
Saturday, May 24
7	10:00 am	No. 5 Toledo vs No. 3 Ball State	13−10	Ball State Eliminated	
8	2:00 pm	No. 2 Kent State vs No. 1 Miami Ohio	1−6		
9	6:00 pm	No. 5 Toledo vs No. 2 Kent State	6−2	Kent State Eliminated	
Sunday, May 25
10	12:00pm	No. 1 Miami Ohio vs No. 5 Toledo	6−3	MAC Tournament Championship	

== All–Tournament Team ==
Player	Team
Drew Beckner	Eastern Michigan
Dylan Grego	Ball State
John Chambers	Ball State
Luke Leto	Toledo
Caden Konczak	Toledo
Ryan Kennedy	Toledo
Anthony Zarlingo	Miami
Cooper Katskee	Miami
**Dominic Krupinski**	Miami
Clayton Burke	Miami

MVP in bold
