= Tamás Nagy =

Tamás Nagy may refer to:

- Tamás Nagy (footballer, born 1963), Hungarian football manager
- Tamás Nagy (footballer, born 1976), Hungarian footballer
- Tamás Nagy (footballer, born 1987), Hungarian footballer for Vasas SC
- Tamás Nagy (footballer, born 1988), Hungarian footballer for Lombard-Pápa TFC
