= 2024 Mid-American Conference baseball tournament =

American collegiate baseball tournament

- Teams: 6
- Format: Double-elimination
- Finals site: Crushers Stadium; Avon, Ohio
- Champions: Western Michigan (2nd title)
- Winning coach: Billy Gernon (1st title)
- MVP: Dylan Nevar (Western Michigan)
- Television: ESPN+

2024 Mid-American Conference baseball standings
	Conf.						Overall
Team	W		L		T	PCT	W		L		T	PCT
Bowling Green ‍†‍‍	25	–	6	–	0	.806	33	–	20	–	0	.623
Western Michigan ‍‍‡‍^{y}	19	–	11	–	0	.633	32	–	21	–	0	.604
Ball State ‍‍‍	18	–	12	–	0	.600	35	–	23	–	1	.602
Miami (OH) ‍‍‍	17	–	13	–	0	.567	27	–	27	–	0	.500
Kent State ‍‍‍	16	–	13	–	0	.552	26	–	27	–	0	.491
Toledo ‍‍‍	16	–	15	–	0	.516	27	–	32	–	0	.458
Northern Illinois ‍‍‍	14	–	16	–	0	.467	21	–	33	–	0	.389
Ohio ‍‍‍	13	–	17	–	0	.433	18	–	32	–	0	.360
Akron ‍‍‍	10	–	19	–	0	.345	15	–	38	–	0	.283
Eastern Michigan ‍‍‍	9	–	21	–	0	.300	14	–	38	–	0	.269
Central Michigan ‍‍‍	8	–	22	–	0	.267	17	–	38	–	0	.309
† – Conference champion ‡ – Tournament champion y – Invited to the NCAA Tournament; As of May 25, 2024; Rankings from D1Baseball

The 2024 Mid-American Conference baseball tournament was the postseason baseball tournament for the Mid-American Conference for the 2024 NCAA Division I baseball season, held from May 22–25 at Crushers Stadium in Avon, Ohio. Western Michigan earned the conference's automatic bid to the 2024 NCAA Division I baseball tournament.

== Seeding and format ==
The top six teams were seeded according conference winning percentage. Teams then played a double-elimination tournament with the top two seeds each receiving a single bye. This style of seeding was last used in the 2019 Mid-American Conference baseball tournament.

Seed	School	Conference record	Tiebreaker
1	Bowling Green	25–6	
2	Western Michigan	19–11	
3	Ball State	18–12	
4	Miami (OH)	17–13	
5	Kent State	16–13	
6	Toledo	16–15	

== Results ==
MAC tournament teams
(1) Bowling Green Falcons	(2) Western Michigan Broncos	(3) Ball State Cardinals	(4) Miami RedHawks	(5) Kent State Golden Flashes	(6) Toledo Rockets

Upper round 1	Upper round 2	Upper final	Final
1	Bowling Green	12
3	Ball State	5	4	Miami (OH)	4
6	Toledo	1	1	Bowling Green	0
2	Western Michigan	11
2	Western Michigan	8
4	Miami (OH)	5	3	Ball State	0
5	Kent State	2
2	Western Michigan	10	–
3	Ball State	3	–
Lower round 1	Lower round 2	Lower round 3	Lower final
1	Bowling Green	5
3	Ball State	4	3	Ball State	10
4	Miami (OH)	4	6	Toledo	3
6	Toledo	8	6	Toledo	8
5	Kent State	2

== Schedule ==
Game	Time*	Matchup^{#}	Score	Television	Attendance
Wednesday, May 22
1	12:30 pm	No. 3 Ball State vs. No. 6 Toledo	5–1	ESPN+	N/A
2	6:00 pm	No. 4 Miami (OH) vs. No. 5 Kent State	5–2	ESPN+	919
Thursday, May 23
3	10:30 am	No. 6 Toledo vs. No. 5 Kent State; Elimination Game	8–2	ESPN+	N/A
4	2:30 pm	No. 1 Bowling Green vs. No. 4 Miami (OH)	12–4	ESPN+	N/A
5	6:30 pm	No. 2 Western Michigan vs. No. 3 Ball State	8–0	ESPN+	1,227
Friday, May 24
6	10:00 am	No. 6 Toledo vs. No. 4 Miami (OH); Elimination Game	8–4	ESPN+	N/A
7	2:00 pm	No. 6 Toledo vs. No. 3 Ball State; Elimination Game	3–4	ESPN+	N/A
8	6:00 pm	No. 1 Bowling Green vs. No. 2 Western Michigan	0–11	ESPN+	1,248
Saturday, May 25
9	12:30 pm	No. 1 Bowling Green vs. No. 3 Ball State; Elimination Game	5–10	ESPN+	N/A
10	6:00 pm	No. 2 Western Michigan vs. No. 3 Ball State	10–3	ESPN+	956
*Game times in EDT. # – Rankings denote tournament seed.

== Conference championship ==
May 25, 2024, 6:02 p.m. (EDT) at Mercy Health Stadium in Avon, Ohio
Team	1	2	3	4	5	6	7	8	9	R	H	E
Ball State	0	0	1	0	0	0	0	0	2	3	10	1
Western Michigan	3	0	2	3	0	0	0	2	x	10	15	1
WP: Joe Shapiro (5-0) LP: Logan Schulfer (1-4); Home runs: BALL: None; WM: Josh Swinehart (6); Attendance: 956; Umpires: Sal Giacomantonio (HP), Michael Schultz (1B), Michael Wiseman (2B), Stephen Linton (3B); Boxscore

== All-Tournament Team ==
The following players were named to the All-Tournament Team.

Name	School
Garret Pike	Toledo
Jack Krause	Bowling Green
Matt Gonzalez	Ball State
Merritt Beeker	Ball State
Sam Klein	Ball State
Dylan Nevar (MVP)	Western Michigan
Josh Swinehart	Western Michigan
Cade Sullivan	Western Michigan
Nolan Vlcek	Western Michigan
Brady Miller	Western Michigan
