= Purdue Fort Wayne Mastodons baseball =

Purdue Fort Wayne Mastodons
- Founded: 1972
- Defunct: 2025
- Conference history: Great Lakes Valley (1996–2001) Independent (2002–2008); Summit League (2009–2020) Horizon League (2021–2025)
- University: Purdue University Fort Wayne
- Conference: Horizon League
- Location: Fort Wayne, Indiana
- Home stadium: Mastodon Field (capacity: 200)
- Nickname: Mastodons
- Colors: Black and gold

The Purdue Fort Wayne Mastodons baseball team was the varsity intercollegiate baseball program of Purdue University Fort Wayne in Fort Wayne, Indiana, United States. The program's first season was in 1970, and it was a member of the NCAA Division I Horizon League since the start of the 2021 season. The program was discontinued in May 2025. Its home venue was Mastodon Field, located on Purdue Fort Wayne's campus. Doug Schreiber was the team's head coach starting in the 2020 season.

== History ==
=== Early history ===
The program's first season of play was 1970.

=== Conference affiliations ===
- Great Lakes Valley Conference (1996–2001)
- Independent (2002–2008)
- Summit League (2009–2020)
- Horizon League (2021–2025)

== Mastodon Field ==
The venue has a capacity of 200 spectators.

Prior to the 2011 season, the field's surface and pitcher's mound were renovated. It also features a brick backstop, dugouts, batting cages, and grandstand seating.

== Head coaches ==
Purdue Fort Wayne's longest tenured head coach was Bobby Pierce, who has coached the team from 2009 to 2019. On July 23, 2019, Doug Schreiber was named the team's head coach.

== Head coaches records ==
Year(s)	Coach	Seasons	W–L–T	Pct
1970	Larry Windmiller	1	8–6	.571
1971–1972	Unknown	2	19–13–1	.591
1973	Hal Prickett / Dave Hey	1	Unknown	–
1974–1975	Unknown	2	22–38	.367
1976	Hal Prickett	1	14–19	.424
1977	Phil Kennell	1	18–16	.529
1978	Jeff White	1	6–19	.240
1979–1982	Larry Windmiller	4	30–61	.330
1983	William Bruening	1	12–10	.545
1984–1986	Lee Deturk	3	21–61	.256
1987–1992	Carl Wilcoxson	6	42–138–1	.235
1993–1994	Matt Kinzer	2	47–52	.475
1995–1996	Tom Muth	2	41–36	.532
1997–1998	Tony Vittorio	2	50–41	.549
1999–2008	Billy Gernon	10	124–217–2	.364
2009–2019	Bobby Pierce	11	192–395	.327
2020–2025	Doug Schreiber	5	77–203	.275
Totals	16	55	712–1,283–4	.357

== Notable former players ==
Below is a list of notable former Mastodons and the seasons in which they played for Purdue Fort Wayne.

- Ryan Steinbach (2004–2005)
- Evan Miller (2015–2016)

== See also ==
- List of NCAA Division I baseball programs
