= Miami RedHawks baseball =

Baseball team of Miami University

- 2026 Miami RedHawks baseball team
- Founded: 1915; 111 years ago
- University: Miami University
- Head coach: Brian Smiley (3rd season)
- Conference: Mid–American
- Location: Oxford, Ohio
- Home stadium: McKie Field at Hayden Park (2002–present) (capacity: 1,000)
- Nickname: RedHawks
- Colors: Red and white

NCAA tournament appearances
- 1973, 1974, 1977, 1979, 1983, 2000, 2005, 2025

Conference tournament champions
- 1983, 2000, 2005, 2025

Conference regular season champions
- 1973, 1974, 1979, 2025, 2026

The Miami RedHawks baseball team (formerly the Miami Redskins) is the varsity intercollegiate baseball team of Miami University in Oxford, Ohio, United States. The team is a member of the Mid-American Conference, which competes in the National Collegiate Athletic Association Division I.

Beginning play in 1915, and Mid-American Conference (MAC) play in 1948, Miami has made the NCAA Division I Baseball Championship 7 times. The team has won 4 MAC conference championships, 3 MAC East Division titles (divisional play in the MAC was held from 1998 to 2017), and 3 MAC Tournament titles (the tournament began in 1981). The team plays its home games at McKie Field at Hayden Park in Oxford, Ohio.

== Miami Baseball Hall of Famer ==
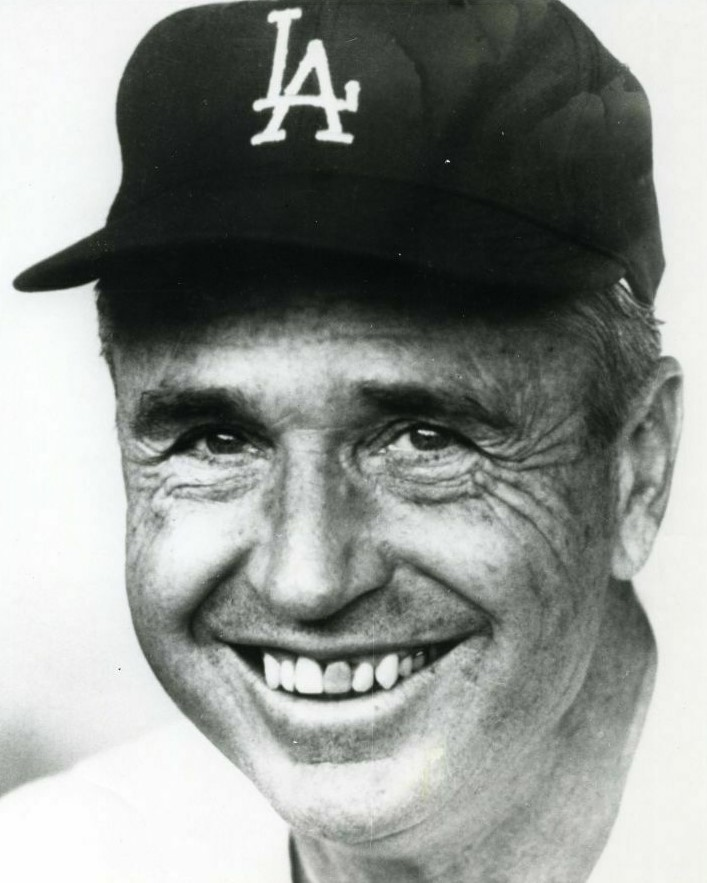
Walter Alston, Dodgers 1976

Walter Alston lettered three years for Miami in both baseball and basketball. He played professionally for the St. Louis Cardinals organization, playing just one game at the major league level (two innings, one at bat) in 1936. After stints in the minors as both a player and manager, Alston returned to the big leagues with the Brooklyn Dodgers as manager in 1954, then moved with the team to Los Angeles in 1958, where he coached until retiring in 1976.

Alston won seven National League pennants in his 23-year tenure as Dodgers manager. The franchise won four world championships as well—in 1955 with Brooklyn and in 1959, 1963 and 1965 with Los Angeles. Named Manager of the Year three times, Alston also guided a victorious National League All-Star squad a record seven times. He retired after the 1976 season with 2,063 wins (2,040 in the regular season and 23 in the postseason) and was elected to the Baseball Hall of Fame in 1983.

Alston is a charter member of the Miami Athletics Hall of Fame, inducted in 1969. In 2001, indicative of the history of developing coaches at the university, Alston was inducted into the Miami Cradle of Coaches alongside Miami legends such as Ara Parseghian, Weeb Ewbank and Paul Brown.

== Other notable players ==
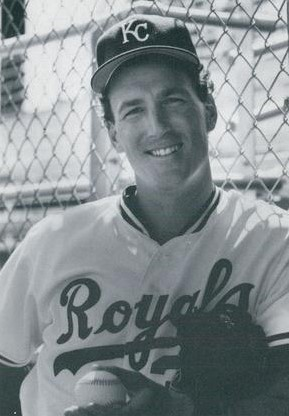
Charlie Liebrandt, Royals, 1988

The first Miamian to play in the major leagues was Eddie Morgan of Lakewood, Ohio who played for two seasons with the St. Louis Cardinals (1936) and Brooklyn Dodgers (1937). Buddy Schultz, an All-American for Miami in 1972, played for 5 seasons with the Chicago Cubs and St. Louis Cardinals (1975–1979), but is famous for striking out 26 batters in a single game (a 27th out was a bunt fielded by Schultz) for Miami against Wright State in 1971, setting an NCAA record.

Charlie Liebrandt, First Team All-MAC in 1978, won 140 games in a stellar 14-year MLB career, including helping the Kansas City Royals to a World Series title in 1985. Steve Fireovid pitched for 6 seasons in the majors, but is perhaps best known as the subject of the book The 26th Man: One Minor League Pitcher's Pursuit of a Dream, written with fellow Miami alumnus Mark Winegardner. In 1990, while pitching for the Montreal Expos’ Triple-A affiliate Indianapolis Indians, Fireovid composed a journal of his experiences. The journal was turned into a book, The 26th Man: One Minor League Pitcher's Pursuit of a Dream in 1991. The book was co-authored by Winegardner.

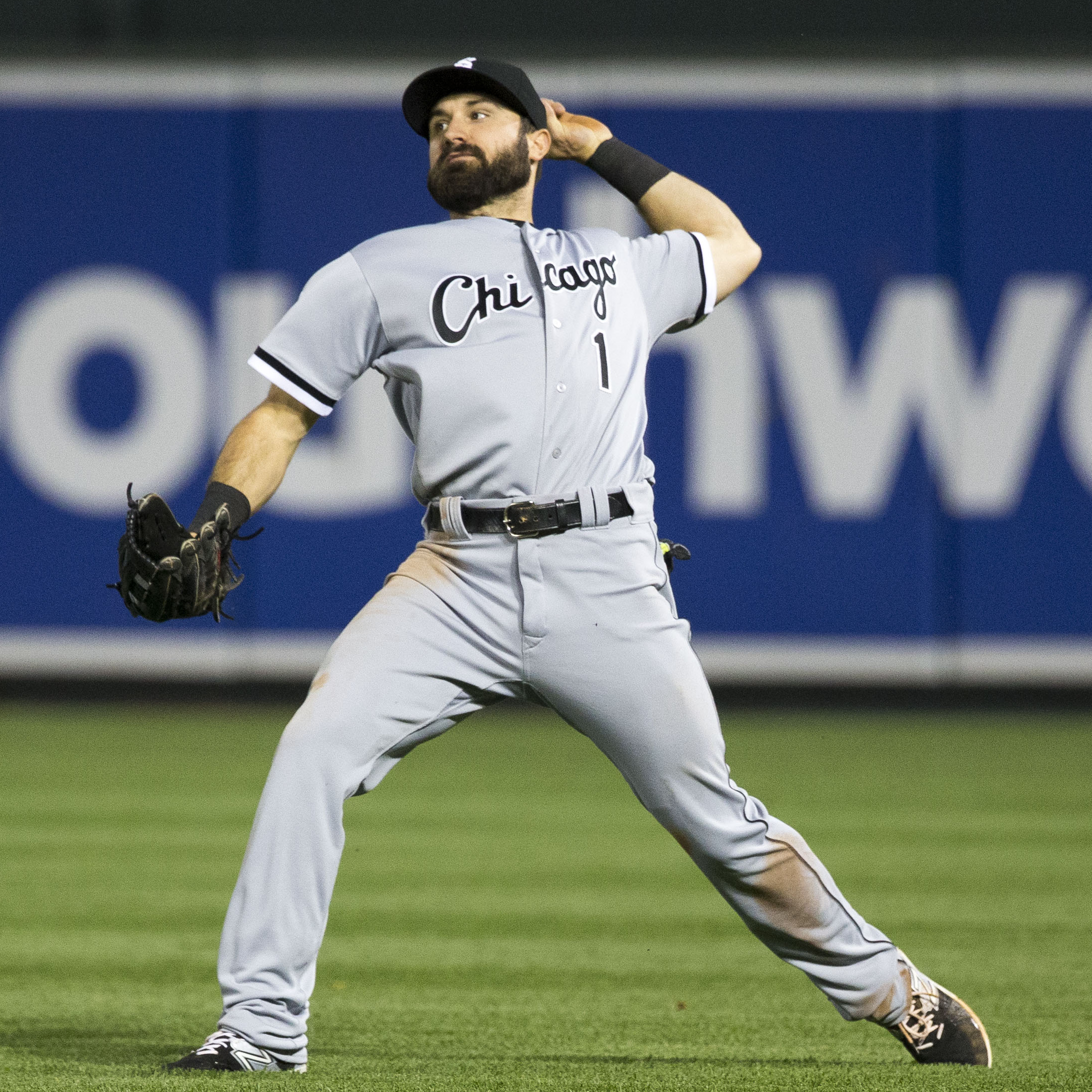
Adam Eaton, Chicago White Sox, 2016

Bill Doran was a Miami All-American in 1979, would go on to 12-year professional career, and played for his hometown Cincinnati Reds during their 1990 World Series winning campaign. Tim Naehring was the Mid-American Conference Baseball Player of the Year in 1988 and would play for 8 years with the Boston Red Sox. Chris Sexton was an All-MAC player for three seasons (1991–1992) in Oxford, was honored as the second Miamian to win the MAC Player of the Year award and would play professionally for the Colorado Rockies (1995) and Cincinnati Reds (1997).

Adam Eaton was a two-time All-MAC player for Miami, would play professionally in the majors for 10-years, including a 2019 World Series title with the Washington Nationals. Seth Varner was the 2014 MAC Pitcher of the Year, joined by Cooper Katskee in 2025.

And Miami continues to serve as a launching pad for coaches. Tracy Smith played for Miami (1985–1988), coached the RedHawks (1997–2005), including the 2005 MAC regular season and MAC Tournament championship team, and has also led Arizona State, Indiana and the Michigan Wolverines. Smith was named the Big Ten and National Coach of the Year in 2014. Danny Hall was a 4-year letterman for Miami baseball (1974–1977), served as the head coach for Georgia Tech for over 30 years, and is a member of the Cradle of Coaches along with Smith.

In total, since the Major League Baseball draft began in 1965, Miami has had over 74 players selected. Robert Bixler was the first Miamian ever drafted, in the 46th round by the Detroit Tigers in the 1965 inaugural draft, who would go unsigned. Over 26 RedHawk players have appeared in the major leagues, and 9 have been honored as All-American - Gary Cooper (1972), Buddy Schultz (1972), Dennis Smith (1973), Mark Naehring (1977), Bill Doran (1979), Jason Knoedler (2001), Michael Carlin (2002), Mike Ferris (2004), and John Slone (2004).

== Miami in the NCAA tournament ==
Year	Pool participants	Record	Results
1973	Minnesota, Southern Illinois, Marshall	1–2	Lost lower round one semifinal
1974	Minnesota, Southern Illinois, Cincinnati	1–2	Lost lower round one semifinal
1977	Lamar, Baylor	2–2	Lost regional final
1979	San Diego State, Michigan State	0–2	Lost lower round one quarterfinal
1983	Indiana State, Morehead State, Michigan	1–2	Lost regional semifinal
2000	Arizona State, Creighton, Texas	1–2	Lost regional semifinal
2005	Arkansas, Quinnipiac, Texas	1–2	Lost regional semifinal
2025	Cincinnati, Tennessee, Wake Forest	0–2	Lost regional semifinal

== Conference championships ==
Season	Conference title	Record	Coach	All-MAC first-team players
1973	MAC regular season	28–9 (14–4)	Bud Middaugh	Gary Wright, Dennis Smith
1974	MAC regular season	31–20 (12–5)	Bud Middaugh	Bro Johnson, Jack Kucek
1979	MAC regular season	34–12 (13–3)	Bud Middaugh	Bill Doran, Dean Gottler, Bill Long
1983	MAC Tournament	36–15 (8–6)	Jon Pavlisko	Kevin Davis, Brian Koury, Mark Manering, Kevin Wright
2000	MAC Tournament	40–23 (16–12)	Tracy Smith	John Lackaff (tourney MVP), Chris Leonard, Clark Mace
2005	MAC Tournament	45–18 (17–4)	Tracy Smith	Brian Canada, Keith Weiser
2025	MAC Tournament	35–21 (23–7)	Brian Smiley	Evan Applewick, Cooper Katskee
2026	MAC regular season	38–17 (25–8)	Brian Smiley	Diego Cruz, Tommy Harrison, Marcus Dierks, Austin Berggren

== See also ==
- List of NCAA Division I baseball programs
