= Mastodon Field =

College baseball field in Indiana, U.S.

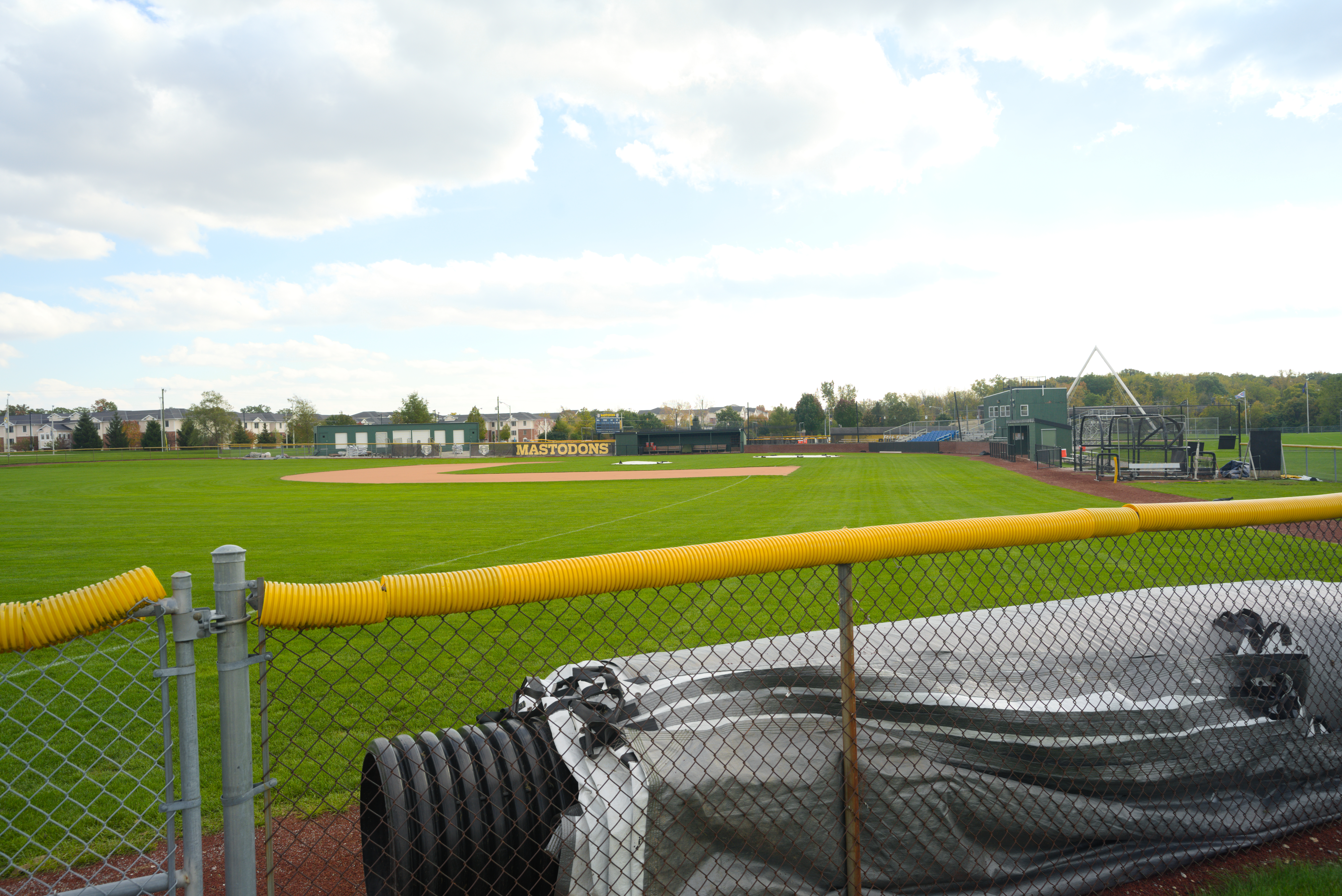
- Interactive map of Mastodon Field
- Location: Broyles Boulevard, Fort Wayne, Indiana, U.S.
- Coordinates: 41.1183°N 85.1037°W
- Owner: Purdue University Fort Wayne
- Operator: Purdue University Fort Wayne
- Capacity: 200
- Surface: Natural grass
- Scoreboard: Electronic
- Field size: 335 ft. (LF); 380 ft. (LCF); 405 ft. (CF); 380 ft. (RCF); 335 ft. (RF)

Tenant
- Purdue Fort Wayne Mastodons (NCAA D-I Horizon League)

Mastodon Field is a baseball venue in Fort Wayne, Indiana, United States. It was home to the Purdue Fort Wayne Mastodons baseball team until the teams discontinuation in 2025. The venue has a capacity of 200 spectators.

Prior to the 2011 season, the field's surface and pitcher's mound were renovated. It also features a brick backstop, dugouts, batting cages, and grandstand seating.

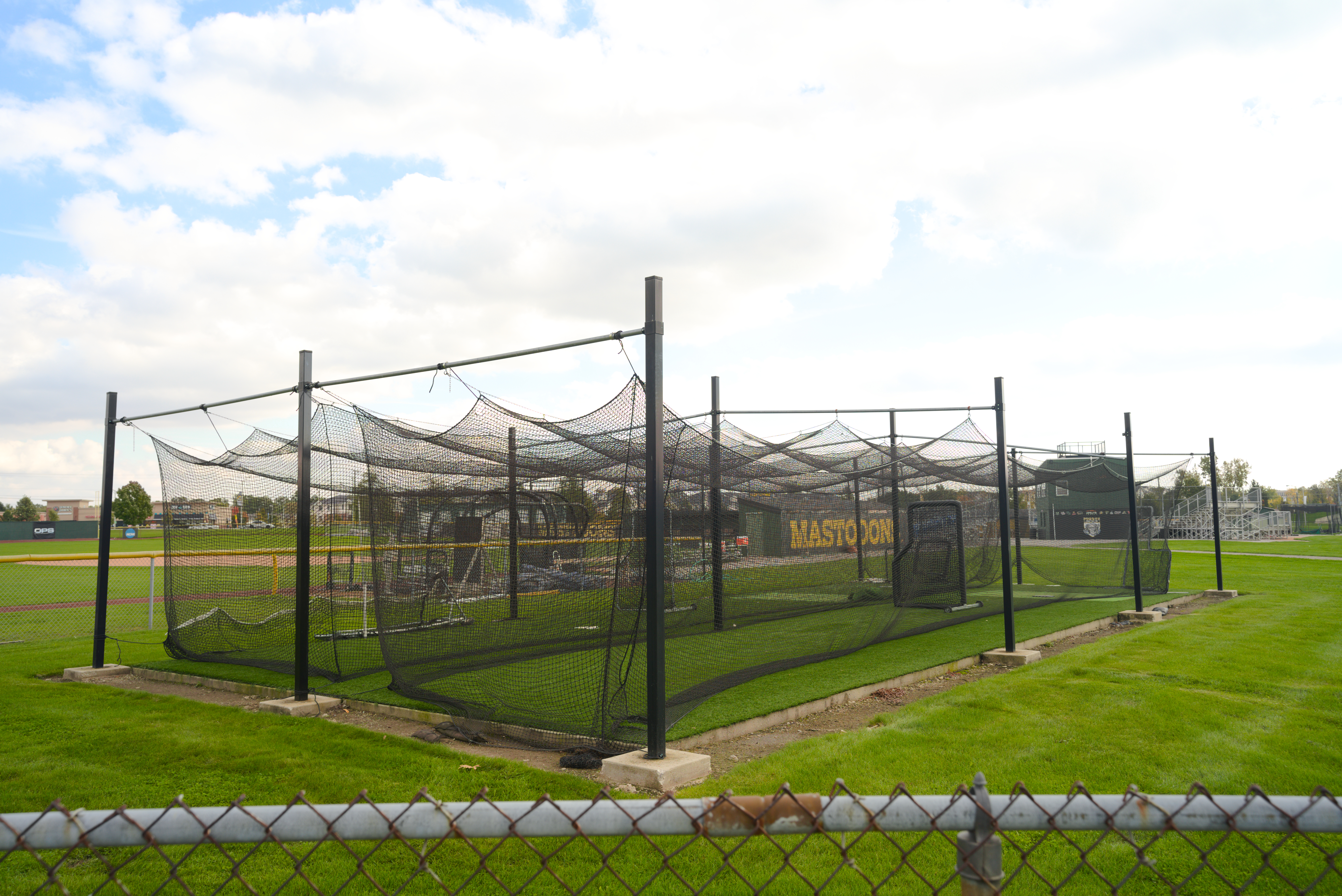
The batting cages

== See also ==
- List of NCAA Division I baseball venues
