= ForeFront Field =

Baseball park in Avon, Ohio, United States

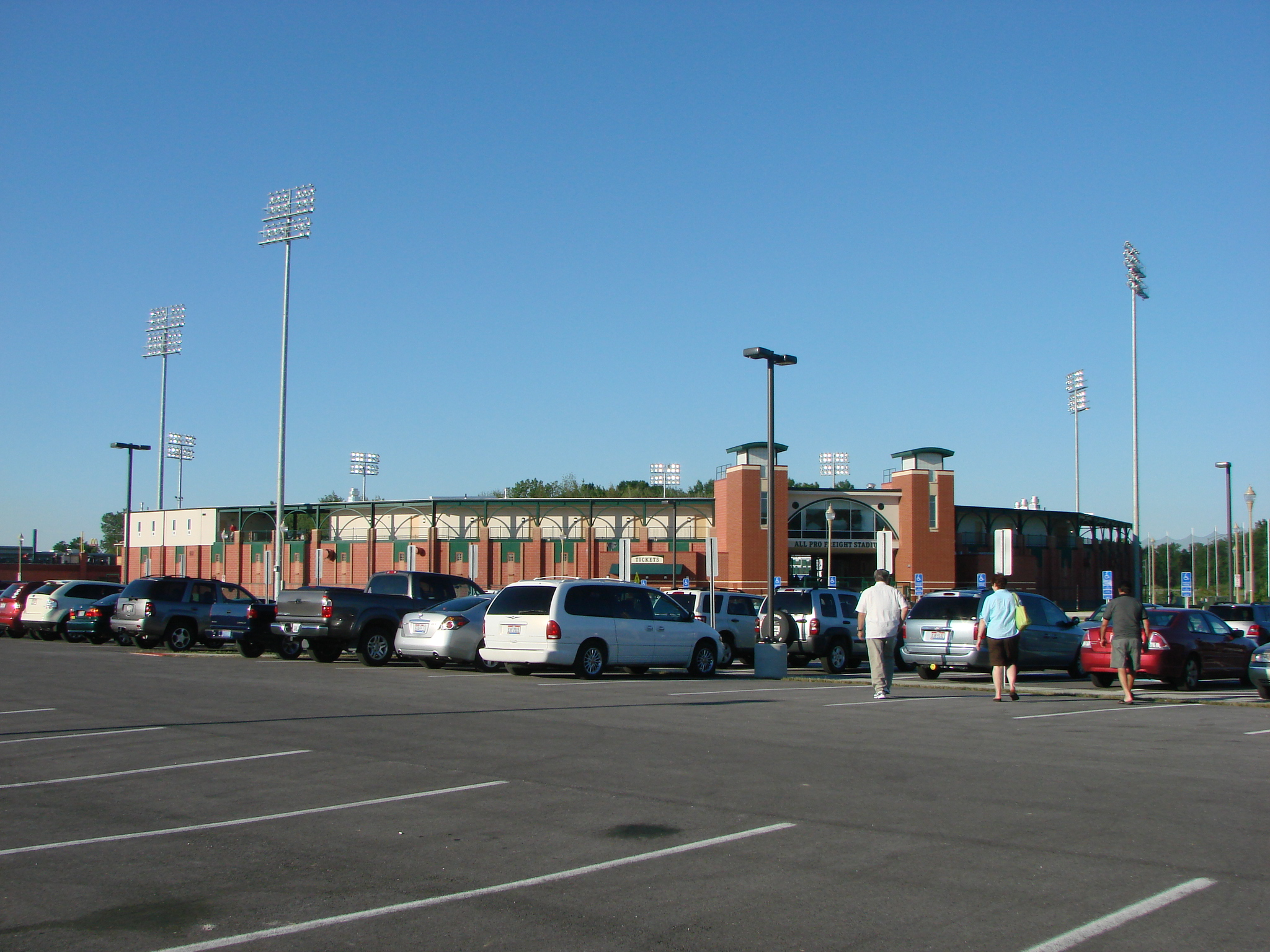
- Exterior view in 2010
- Interactive map of ForeFront Field
- Former names: All Pro Freight Stadium (2009–2017); Sprenger Stadium (2017–2019); Mercy Health Stadium (2021–2023); Crushers Stadium (2023–2025)
- Address: 2009 Baseball Boulevard; Avon, Ohio
- Coordinates: 41°27′35″N 82°3′41″W
- Owner: City of Avon
- Operator: Bluedog Baseball LLC
- Capacity: 5,000

Construction
- Groundbreaking: July 1, 2008
- Opened: June 2, 2009
- Cost: $12.1 million
- Architects: OSports – Osborn Sports and Recreation Architecture
- Structural engineer: Osborn Engineering
- General contractor: Infinity Group

Tenants
- Lake Erie Crushers (NAPB) 2009–present Cleveland State Vikings (NCAA) 2010–2011; Lorain County Leviathan FC (USL2) 2026–present

ForeFront Field is a baseball stadium in Avon, Ohio, United States. It is the home of the Lake Erie Crushers, a National Association of Professional Baseball team that began play in 2009. The ballpark has a capacity of 5,000 people and opened on June 2, 2009, with the Crushers defeating the Windy City Thunderbolts, 5–2. Since opening, the facility has been known by multiple names, including All Pro Freight Stadium from 2009 to 2017, Sprenger Stadium from 2017 to 2019, Mercy Health Stadium from 2021 to 2023 and Crushers Stadium from 2023 to 2025. In addition to Crushers games it has also hosted a number of additional events, particularly in college baseball. Beginning in 2026, the ballpark is scheduled to be the home field for Lorain County Leviathan FC of USL League Two.

== Other uses ==
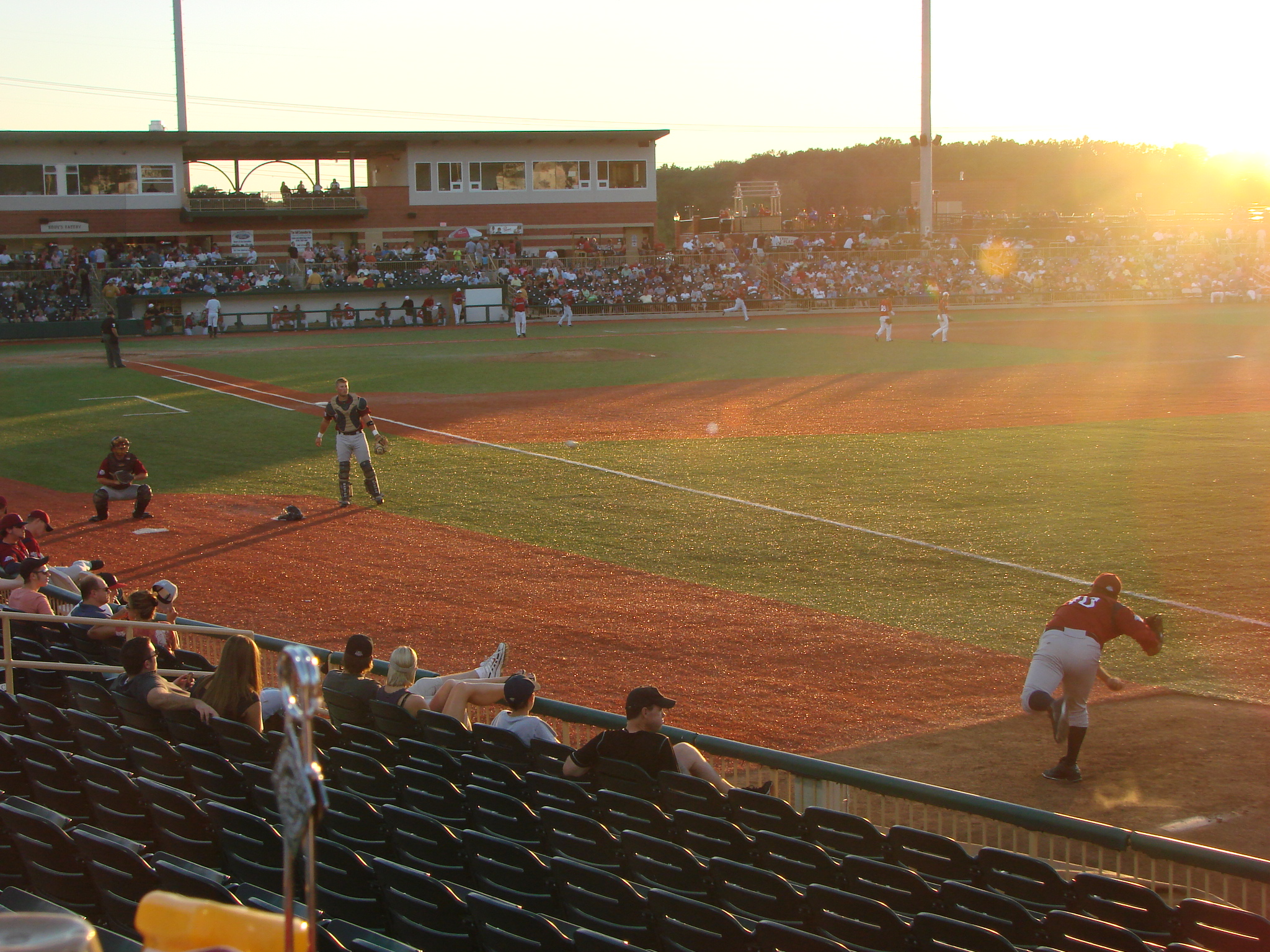
Seating and field, 2010

=== Cleveland State baseball ===
The Cleveland State Vikings baseball team played home games at the ballpark for the 2010 and 2011 seasons. After the 2011 season, however, Cleveland State dropped its baseball program.

=== Mid-American Conference tournament ===
From 2012 through 2019, the ballpark hosted the Mid-American Conference baseball tournament, held in late May. In its most recent setup, the top six teams in the MAC earned berths to the tournament, which used a double-elimination format over five days. The winner of the tournament earned the conference's automatic bid to the NCAA Division I baseball tournament. The 2020 tournament was also scheduled to be held at the ballpark from May 20 through 24, but was cancelled in March 2020 due to the coronavirus pandemic. In May 2020, the Mid-American Conference announced that the baseball tournament was one of eight conference tournaments that were eliminated for at least the next four seasons beginning in 2020–21. The MAC baseball tournament, reinstated in 2022, returned to the facility in 2024.

=== Lorain County Leviathan FC ===
Beginning in 2026, ForeFront Field will be home to Lorain County Leviathan FC, a semi-professional men's soccer club playing in the Great Forest Division of USL League Two.

== Naming ==
Since opening, the ballpark, which is owned by the city of Avon, has had multiple names through naming rights deals. As of November 10, 2025, the facility is named for ForeFront Technology, a business technology solutions company based in Cleveland.

The facility opened in 2009 as All Pro Freight Stadium under a naming rights deal with All Pro Freight Systems, a trucking company based in nearby Westlake, Ohio. In January 2017, the team announced a new naming rights deal with Sprenger Health Care Systems, renaming the park Sprenger Stadium through the 2019 season. No new sponsor was secured prior to the 2020 season, so the ballpark was known as Crushers Stadium, though the COVID-19 pandemic caused the Crushers' season to be canceled, along with the planned 2020 Mid-American Conference baseball tournament.

The team announced in late 2020 that beginning January 1, 2021, the stadium would be known as Mercy Health Stadium after Mercy Health, a Cincinnati-based healthcare provider that operates facilities around the state of Ohio, including two hospitals in the nearby communities of Lorain and Oberlin. Mercy Health had already been the team's health partner since 2012. After the naming rights deal with Mercy Health expired at the end of the 2023 season, the name again reverted to Crushers Stadium while the team searched for a new sponsor.
