= Steller Field =

Baseball park in Bowling Green, Ohio

Warren E. Steller Field
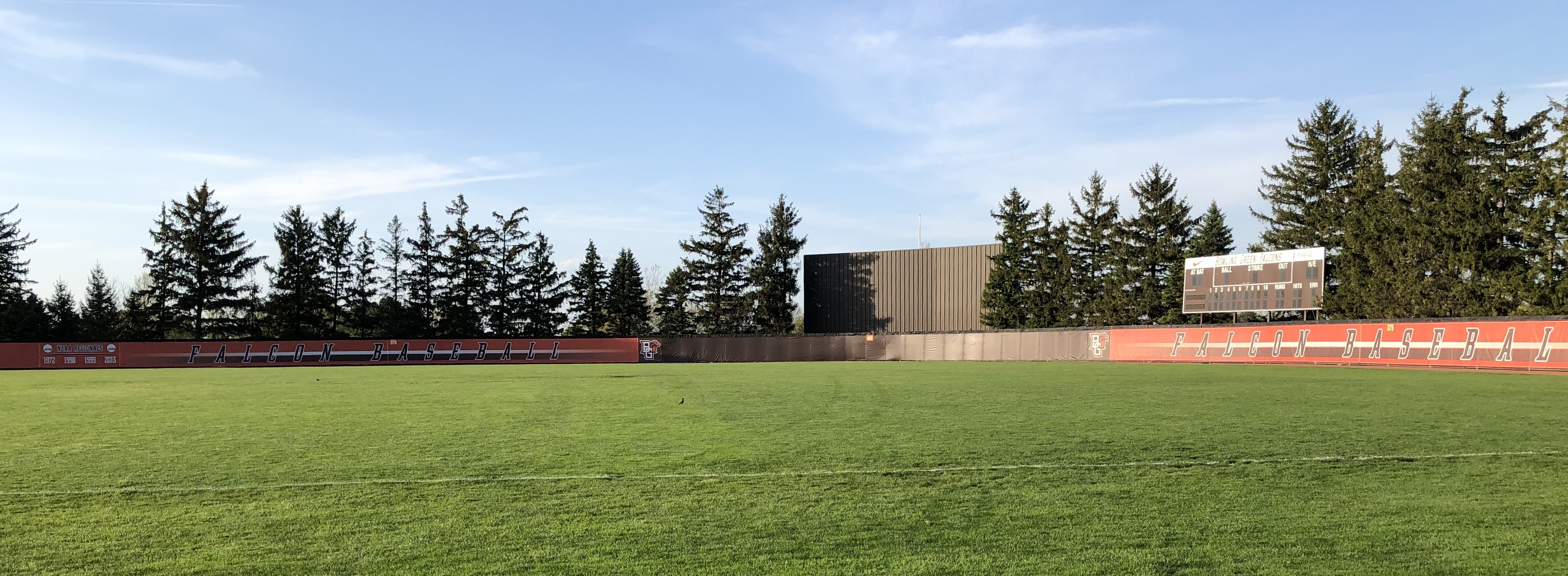
- Interactive map of Warren E. Steller Field
- Location: Bowling Green, Ohio, United States
- Coordinates: 41.380572°N 83.628809°W
- Owner: Bowling Green State University
- Operator: Bowling Green State University
- Capacity: 2,500
- Surface: Natural grass
- Scoreboard: Electronic
- Field size: Left field: 340 feet (100 m); Center field: 400 feet (120 m); Right field: 340 feet (100 m)

Construction
- Opened: 1964
- Cost: $150,000 USD

Tenants
- Bowling Green Falcons baseball (NCAA) (1964–present); Bowling Green Breeze (GLSCL) (1987–1991); Lake Erie Monarchs (GLSCL) (2008)

Warren E. Steller Field is a baseball field at Bowling Green State University in Bowling Green, Ohio, where the Bowling Green Falcons baseball team plays. The field is named after Warren E. Steller, a former BGSU instructor and former coach of the Bowling Green's football (1924–34) and baseball (1925, 1928–59) teams. It was officially named for Warren E. Steller in 1967. Steller Field is located just north of the Slater Family Ice Arena on the eastern side of the campus. The dimensions of the field from home plate to the outfield fences are 340 feet to left field, 400 feet to center field, and 340 feet to right field.

== History ==
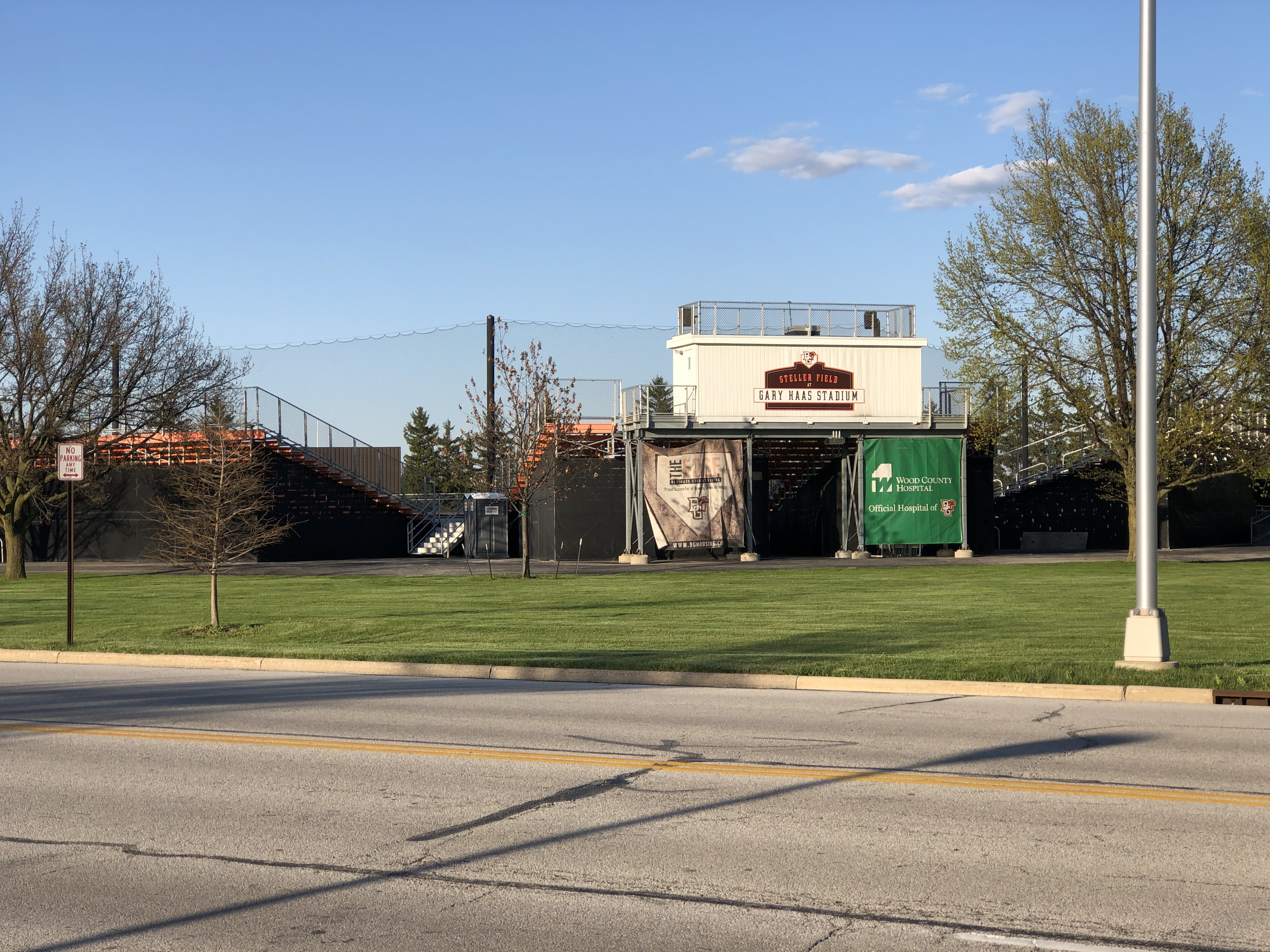
The Steller field at Gary Haas Stadium entrance

Steller Field was built in 1964 and cost $150,000 to construct. Steller Field has seen renovations in 1965, 1968, and 2002, which has expanded the capacity of 2,500. In fall 2012, a new electronic scoreboard was installed at the facility, and the backstop was renovated. In October 2019, the stadium surrounding the field was named the Gary Haas Stadium, after former BGSU baseball player Gary Haas. This changed in December of 2021 when the BGSU board of trustees voted to remove the name.

== Other uses ==
From 1987–1991, the field was home to the Great Lakes Summer Collegiate League's Bowling Green Breeze. In 2008, another Great Lakes Collegiate Summer League team, the Lake Erie Monarchs, used the field for a single season.

== See also ==
- List of NCAA Division I baseball venues
