= Buffalo Bulls baseball, 2010–2019 =

Buffalo Bulls baseball represents the University at Buffalo in college baseball at the NCAA Division I level.

== 2010 ==
2010 Buffalo Bulls baseball
- Conference: Mid-American Conference
- Record: 23–29 (9–18 MAC)
- Head coach: Ron Torgalski (4th season)
- Home stadium: Amherst Audubon Field

2010 Mid-American Conference baseball standings
	Conf.				Overall
Team	W		L	PCT	W		L	PCT
East Division
Kent State ^{x}‍‍‡‍^{y}	18	–	9	.667	39	–	25	.609
Bowling Green ^{x}‍‍‍	18	–	9	.667	31	–	23	.574
Miami ‍‍‍	13	–	14	.481	28	–	28	.500
Ohio ‍‍‍	13	–	14	.481	20	–	35	.364
Buffalo ‍‍‍	9	–	18	.333	23	–	29	.442
Akron ‍‍‍	3	–	24	.111	21	–	34	.382
West Division
Central Michigan ^{x}‍‍‍	20	–	7	.741	36	–	22	.621
Toledo ‍‍‍	19	–	8	.704	34	–	22	.607
Ball State ‍‍‍	19	–	8	.704	29	–	29	.500
Eastern Michigan ‍‍‍	13	–	14	.481	27	–	32	.458
Northern Illinois ‍‍‍	12	–	15	.444	24	–	31	.436
Western Michigan ‍‍‍	5	–	22	.185	12	–	42	.222
x – Division champion ‡ – Tournament champion y – Invited to the 2010 NCAA Division I baseball tournament As of June 7, 2010; Rankings from Collegiate Baseball

The 2010 Buffalo Bulls baseball team represented the University at Buffalo in the 2010 NCAA Division I baseball season. The Bulls played their home games at Amherst Audubon Field, and were led by fourth year head coach Ron Torgalski. They finished the season 23–29, 9–18 in MAC play to finish in fifth place in the East Division.

== 2011 ==
2011 Buffalo Bulls baseball
- Conference: Mid-American Conference
- Record: 14–38 (3–22 MAC)
- Head coach: Ron Torgalski (5th season)
- Home stadium: Amherst Audubon Field

2011 Mid-American Conference baseball standings
	Conf.				Overall
Team	W		L	PCT	W		L	PCT
East Division
No. 26 Kent State ^{x}‍‍‡‍^{y}	21	–	5	.808	45	–	17	.726
Miami ‍‍‍	18	–	9	.667	35	–	25	.583
Bowling Green ‍‍‍	11	–	14	.440	20	–	31	.392
Ohio ‍‍‍	11	–	16	.407	27	–	27	.500
Akron ‍‍‍	7	–	20	.259	16	–	37	.302
Buffalo ‍‍‍	3	–	22	.120	14	–	38	.269
West Division
Central Michigan ^{x}‍‍‍	17	–	9	.654	31	–	27	.534
Eastern Michigan ‍‍‍	16	–	11	.593	37	–	22	.627
Northern Illinois ‍‍‍	16	–	11	.593	30	–	27	.526
Toledo ‍‍‍	15	–	12	.556	26	–	29	.473
Western Michigan ‍‍‍	12	–	14	.462	26	–	31	.456
Ball State ‍‍‍	11	–	15	.423	15	–	35	.300
x – Division champion ‡ – Tournament champion y – Invited to the NCAA tournament As of June 7, 2011; Rankings from Collegiate Baseball

The 2011 Buffalo Bulls baseball team represented the University at Buffalo in the 2011 NCAA Division I baseball season. The Bulls played their home games at Amherst Audubon Field, and were led by fifth year head coach Ron Torgalski. They finished the season 14–38, 3–22 in MAC play to finish in sixth place in the East Division.

== 2012 ==
2012 Buffalo Bulls baseball
- Conference: Mid-American Conference
- Record: 20–36 (10–16 MAC)
- Head coach: Ron Torgalski (6th season)
- Home stadium: Amherst Audubon Field

2012 Mid-American Conference baseball standings
	Conf.				Overall
Team	W		L	PCT	W		L	PCT
East Division
Kent State ^{x}‍‍‡‍^{y}	24	–	3	.889	47	–	20	.701
Ohio ‍‍‍	16	–	11	.593	28	–	29	.491
Miami ‍‍‍	12	–	15	.444	30	–	29	.508
Buffalo ‍‍‍	10	–	16	.385	20	–	36	.357
Akron ‍‍‍	10	–	17	.370	17	–	38	.309
Bowling Green ‍‍‍	9	–	18	.333	20	–	33	.377
West Division
Toledo ^{x}‍‍‍	19	–	8	.704	30	–	27	.526
Central Michigan ‍‍‍	17	–	10	.630	34	–	29	.540
Western Michigan ‍‍‍	14	–	12	.538	26	–	29	.473
Eastern Michigan ‍‍‍	14	–	13	.519	25	–	31	.446
Ball State ‍‍‍	9	–	18	.333	14	–	36	.280
Northern Illinois ‍‍‍	7	–	20	.259	15	–	40	.273
x – Division champion ‡ – Tournament champion y – Invited to the 2012 NCAA Division I baseball tournament As of May 30, 2012; Rankings from Coaches' Poll

The 2012 Buffalo Bulls baseball team represented the University at Buffalo in the 2012 NCAA Division I baseball season. The Bulls played their home games at Amherst Audubon Field, and were led by sixth year head coach Ron Torgalski. They finished the season 20–36, 10–16 in MAC play to finish in fourth place in the East Division.

=== Draft Selections ===
- C Tom Murphy – 3rd Round, 105th Overall Colorado Rockies

== 2013 ==
2013 Buffalo Bulls baseball
- Conference: Mid-American Conference
- Record: 33–24 (19–7 MAC)
- Head coach: Ron Torgalski (7th season)
- Home stadium: Amherst Audubon Field

2013 Mid-American Conference baseball standings
	Conf.				Overall
Team	W		L	PCT	W		L	PCT
East Division
Kent State ^{x}‍‍‍	20	–	7	.741	36	–	23	.610
Buffalo ‍‍‍	19	–	7	.731	33	–	24	.579
Miami ‍‍‍	14	–	13	.519	26	–	30	.464
Bowling Green ‍‍‡‍^{y}	13	–	14	.481	24	–	31	.436
Akron ‍‍‍	10	–	16	.385	15	–	37	.288
Ohio ‍‍‍	9	–	18	.333	14	–	39	.264
West Division
Northern Illinois ^{x}‍‍‍	16	–	11	.593	22	–	34	.393
Ball State ‍‍‍	15	–	12	.556	31	–	24	.564
Toledo ‍‍‍	13	–	14	.481	25	–	33	.431
Eastern Michigan ‍‍‍	12	–	15	.444	26	–	28	.481
Central Michigan ‍‍‍	12	–	15	.444	25	–	32	.439
Western Michigan ‍‍‍	8	–	19	.296	16	–	38	.296
x – Division champion ‡ – Tournament champion y – Invited to the NCAA tournament As of June 4, 2013; Rankings from Collegiate Baseball

The 2013 Buffalo Bulls baseball team represented the University at Buffalo in the 2013 NCAA Division I baseball season. The Bulls played their home games at Amherst Audubon Field, and were led by seventh year head coach Ron Torgalski. They finished the season 33–24, 19–7 in MAC play to finish in second place in the East Division.

=== Draft Selections ===
- CF Jason Kanzler – 20th Round, 590th Overall Minnesota Twins

== 2014 ==
2014 Buffalo Bulls baseball
- Conference: Mid-American Conference
- Record: 26–26 (13–13 MAC)
- Head coach: Ron Torgalski (8th season)
- Home stadium: Amherst Audubon Field

2014 Mid-American Conference baseball standings
	Conf.						Overall
Team	W		L		T	PCT	W		L		T	PCT
East Division
Miami (OH) ^{x}‍‍‍	18	–	9	–	0	.667	30	–	27	–	0	.526
Kent State ‍‍‡‍^{y}	16	–	11	–	0	.593	36	–	21	–	0	.632
Bowling Green ‍‍‍	15	–	12	–	0	.556	25	–	27	–	0	.481
Buffalo ‍‍‍	13	–	13	–	0	.500	26	–	26	–	0	.500
Akron ‍‍‍	12	–	15	–	0	.444	28	–	29	–	0	.491
Ohio ‍‍‍	7	–	20	–	0	.259	11	–	40	–	0	.216
West Division
Ball State ^{x}‍‍‍	22	–	4	–	0	.846	39	–	18	–	0	.684
Central Michigan ‍‍‍	19	–	8	–	0	.704	36	–	23	–	0	.610
Western Michigan ‍‍‍	11	–	16	–	0	.407	24	–	31	–	0	.436
Toledo ‍‍‍	11	–	16	–	0	.407	21	–	32	–	0	.396
Northern Illinois ‍‍‍	11	–	16	–	0	.407	17	–	35	–	1	.330
Eastern Michigan ‍‍‍	6	–	21	–	0	.222	19	–	34	–	0	.358
x – Division champion ‡ – Tournament champion y – Invited to the NCAA tournament Rankings from Collegiate Baseball

The 2014 Buffalo Bulls baseball team represented the University at Buffalo in the 2014 NCAA Division I baseball season. The Bulls played their home games at Amherst Audubon Field, and were led by eighth year head coach Ron Torgalski. They finished the season 26–26, 13–13 in MAC play to finish in fourth place in the East Division.

=== Draft Selections ===
- 3B Tyler Mautner – 14th Round, 410th Overall Minnesota Twins
- RHP Mike Burke – 30th Round, 901st Overall Baltimore Orioles

== 2015 ==
2015 Buffalo Bulls baseball
- Conference: Mid-American Conference
- Record: 16–35 (7–20 MAC)
- Head coach: Ron Torgalski (9th season)
- Home stadium: Amherst Audubon Field

2015 Mid-American Conference baseball standings
	Conf.				Overall
Team	W		L	PCT	W		L	PCT
East Division
Kent State ^{x}‍‍‍	18	–	9	.667	31	–	22	.585
Ohio ‍‍‡‍^{y}	17	–	10	.630	36	–	21	.632
Bowling Green ‍‍‍	14	–	13	.519	25	–	29	.463
Akron ‍‍‍	13	–	14	.481	28	–	30	.483
Miami (OH) ‍‍‍	11	–	16	.407	13	–	39	.250
Buffalo ‍‍‍	7	–	20	.259	16	–	35	.314
West Division
Central Michigan ^{x}‍‍‍	20	–	7	.741	35	–	22	.614
Toledo ‍‍‍	16	–	11	.593	25	–	33	.431
Ball State ‍‍‍	14	–	13	.519	33	–	25	.569
Western Michigan ‍‍‍	13	–	14	.481	22	–	30	.423
Northern Illinois ‍‍‍	10	–	17	.370	22	–	33	.400
Eastern Michigan ‍‍‍	9	–	18	.333	20	–	35	.364
x – Division champion ‡ – Tournament champion y – Invited to the NCAA tournament As of June 2, 2015; Rankings from Collegiate Baseball

The 2015 Buffalo Bulls baseball team represented the University at Buffalo in the 2015 NCAA Division I baseball season. The Bulls played their home games at Amherst Audubon Field, and were led by ninth year head coach Ron Torgalski. They finished the season 16–35, 7–20 in MAC play to finish in sixth place in the East Division.

=== Draft Selections ===
- OF Nick Sinay – 22nd Round, 662th Overall Toronto Blue Jays

== 2016 ==
2016 Buffalo Bulls baseball
- Conference: Mid-American Conference
- Record: 21–31 (8–16 MAC)
- Head coach: Ron Torgalski (10th season)
- Home stadium: Amherst Audubon Field

2016 Mid-American Conference baseball standings
	Conf.						Overall
Team	W		L		T	PCT	W		L		T	PCT
East Division
Kent State ^{x}‍‍‍	20	–	4	–	0	.833	44	–	14	–	0	.759
Miami (OH) ‍‍‍	14	–	10	–	0	.583	27	–	29	–	0	.482
Ohio ‍‍‍	8	–	16	–	0	.333	23	–	29	–	0	.442
Buffalo ‍‍‍	8	–	16	–	0	.333	21	–	31	–	0	.404
Bowling Green ‍‍‍	7	–	17	–	0	.292	17	–	37	–	0	.315
West Division
Ball State ^{x}‍‍‍	15	–	9	–	0	.625	32	–	26	–	0	.552
Northern Illinois ‍‍‍	14	–	10	–	0	.583	24	–	32	–	0	.429
Toledo ‍‍‍	13	–	11	–	0	.542	19	–	38	–	1	.336
Central Michigan ‍‍‍	12	–	12	–	0	.500	24	–	37	–	0	.393
Western Michigan ‡^{y} ‍‍‍	11	–	13	–	0	.458	22	–	34	–	0	.393
Eastern Michigan ‍‍‍	10	–	14	–	0	.417	23	–	36	–	0	.390
x – Division champion ‡ – Tournament champion y – Invited to the NCAA tournament As of June 11, 2016; Rankings from Collegiate Baseball

The 2016 Buffalo Bulls baseball team represented the University at Buffalo in the 2016 NCAA Division I baseball season. The Bulls played their home games at Amherst Audubon Field, and were led by tenth year head coach Ron Torgalski. They finished the season 21–31, 8–16 in MAC play to finish tied for third place in the East Division.

== 2017 ==
2017 Buffalo Bulls baseball
- Conference: Mid-American Conference
- Record: 17–34 (8–16 MAC)
- Head coach: Ron Torgalski (11th season)
- Home stadium: Amherst Audubon Field

2017 Mid-American Conference baseball standings
	Conf.				Overall
Team	W		L	PCT	W		L	PCT
East Division
Kent State ^{x}‍†‍‍	18	–	6	.750	37	–	18	.673
Ohio ‍‍‡‍^{y}	13	–	11	.542	31	–	28	.525
Bowling Green ‍‍‍	9	–	15	.375	15	–	34	.306
Miami (OH) ‍‍‍	8	–	16	.333	22	–	34	.393
Buffalo ‍‍‍	8	–	16	.333	17	–	34	.333
West Division
Central Michigan ^{x}‍‍‍	16	–	8	.667	31	–	28	.525
Ball State ‍‍‍	14	–	10	.583	30	–	28	.517
Eastern Michigan ‍‍‍	14	–	10	.583	27	–	35	.435
Western Michigan ‍‍‍	12	–	12	.500	24	–	29	.453
Northern Illinois ‍‍‍	11	–	13	.458	17	–	38	.309
Toledo ‍‍‍	9	–	15	.375	17	–	41	.293
x – Division champion † – Conference champion ‡ – Tournament champion y – Invited to the NCAA tournament Rankings from Collegiate Baseball

The 2017 Buffalo Bulls baseball team represented the University at Buffalo in the 2017 NCAA Division I baseball season, the final season in the program's history. The Bulls played their home games at Amherst Audubon Field, and were led by 11th year head coach Ron Torgalski. The Bulls finished 17–34 overall and 8–16 in Mid-American Conference (MAC) play, which put them in a tie for fourth place in the MAC East division and a tie for 10th in the overall conference standings. Buffalo did not qualify for the 2017 Mid-American Conference baseball tournament as the tournament only the top eight teams in the conference.

Buffalo announced the elimination of baseball and three other sports on April 3, 2017. Their final home game was a 10-inning, 10–9 win over Niagara on May 16, and the final game in the program's history was played May 20 at Western Michigan, a 7–3 loss to the Broncos as part of a doubleheader.
