= Scott Stricklin =

Scott Stricklin may refer to:

- Scott Stricklin (athletic director), athletic director of the University of Florida
- Scott Stricklin (baseball), head coach of the University of Georgia baseball team
