= Florida Gators baseball =

Baseball team of the University of Florida

- 2027 Florida Gators baseball team
- Founded: 1912; 114 years ago
- University: University of Florida
- Athletic director: Scott Stricklin
- Head coach: Kevin O'Sullivan (19th season)
- Conference: SEC
- Location: Gainesville, Florida
- Home stadium: Condron Ballpark (capacity: 7,000)
- Nickname: Gators
- Colors: Orange and blue

College World Series champions
- 2017

College World Series runner-up
- 2005, 2011, 2023

College World Series appearances
- 1988, 1991, 1996, 1998, 2005, 2010, 2011, 2012, 2015, 2016, 2017, 2018, 2023, 2024

NCAA regional champions
- 1988, 1991, 1996, 1998, 2004, 2005, 2009, 2010, 2011, 2012, 2015, 2016, 2017, 2018, 2023, 2024

NCAA tournament appearances
- 1958, 1960, 1962, 1977, 1979, 1981, 1982, 1984, 1985, 1988, 1989, 1991, 1992, 1994, 1996, 1997, 1998, 2000, 2001, 2002, 2003, 2004, 2005, 2008, 2009, 2010, 2011, 2012, 2013, 2014, 2015, 2016, 2017, 2018, 2019, 2021, 2022, 2023, 2024, 2025, 2026

Conference tournament champions
- 1981, 1982, 1984, 1988, 1991, 2011, 2015

Conference regular season champions
- 1952, 1956, 1962, 1981, 1982, 1984, 1988, 1996, 1998, 2005, 2010, 2011, 2014, 2017, 2018, 2023

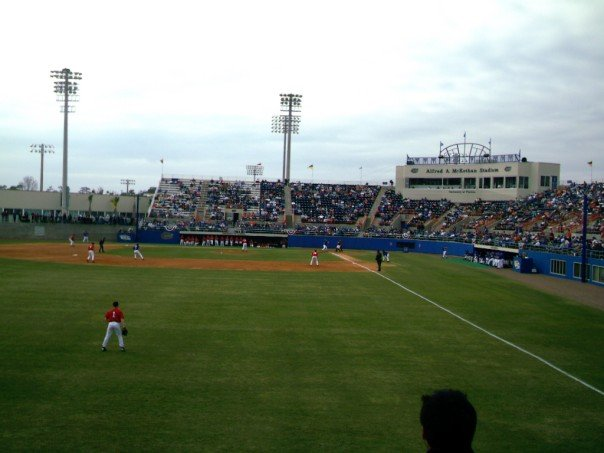
McKethan Stadium, home of Gator baseball until 2020

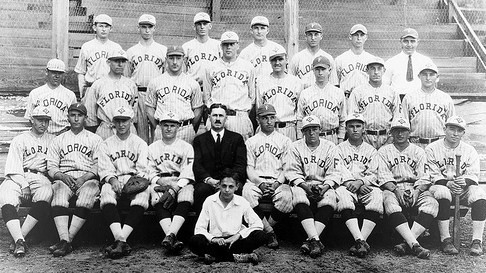
A picture of the 1924 Baseball team

The Florida Gators baseball team represents the University of Florida in the sport of baseball. Florida competes in Division I of the National Collegiate Athletic Association (NCAA), and the Southeastern Conference (SEC). They play their home games in Condron Ballpark on the university's Gainesville, Florida, campus, and are currently led by head coach Kevin O'Sullivan. In the 105-season history of the Florida baseball program, the team has won 16 SEC championships and has appeared in 14 College World Series tournaments. The Gators won their first national championship in 2017.

== History ==
The modern University of Florida was created in 1905 when the Florida Legislature passed the Buckman Act to consolidate the university's four predecessor institutions into the new "University of the State of Florida." The school fielded a club-level baseball team when its campus opened in Gainesville for the 1906-07 school year, with the squad playing most of its home games at a downtown municipal park. When the university opened on-campus University Athletic Field during the spring term of 1911, Florida's baseball team became a varsity intercollegiate program and were the first UF squad to use the facility.

During most of Florida baseball's early existence, the athletic department suffered from a lack of financial resources, and few of the head baseball coaches held the position full-time. A notable exception was Lance Richbourg, who was a Florida alumnus and a Major League Baseball outfielder for the Boston Braves and others, and who led the Gators to a 39–21 overall record (a .650 winning percentage) in 1922, 1923 and 1926. But most UF baseball coaches worked in multiple sports at the school, including William G. Kline (athletic director, head football coach, and head basketball coach), James L. White (athletic director and head basketball coach), Brady Cowell (head basketball and assistant football coach), Ben Clemons, Lewie Hardage, and Sam McAllister (basketball and football coaches).

McAllister was the Gators' last pre-World War II coach, and after the program resumed from a wartime hiatus and he was discharged from military service, he returned to coach the team again in 1946 and 1947.

=== Fuller era: (1948–1975) ===
The modern era for Florida baseball program began in 1948 with two key events. For one, the team moved from their primitive original home ballpark at University Athletic Field / Fleming Field to a more modern facility at Perry Field. For another Dave Fuller became the head baseball coach.

Fuller was originally hired as a physical education instructor in 1946, and also served as an assistant football coach under four different Gators head coaches. Ultimately, he became the longest-serving Gators head coach in any sport, and won more games than any other Gators coach, after leading the Gators baseball team for 28 seasons. Fuller brought stability and consistency to the program, and his Gators teams won SEC championships in 1952, 1956 and 1962, and made appearances in the NCAA tournament in 1958, 1960 and 1962. His final record was 557–354–6 (.611).

=== Bergman era: (1976–1981) ===
Fuller's successor, Jay Bergman, advanced the Florida baseball program a step further. After a difficult transition season in 1976, Bergman's Gators showed marked improvement, winning an SEC championship and SEC tournament title in 1981. His teams also qualified for the NCAA regionals in 1977, 1979, and 1981, and compiled a 7–6 tournament record, but in each instance did not advance beyond the double-elimination opening round of the NCAA tournament. In his six seasons as the Gators' skipper, Bergman posted an overall win–loss record of 216–113 (.657)—the best multi-season winning percentage until that time, and still the second best in Gators baseball history.

=== Arnold era: (1984–1994) ===
Joe Arnold followed Jack Rhines' short two-season stint as Florida's head coach. Arnold's Gators won SEC championships in 1984 and 1988, and SEC tournament titles in 1984, 1988 and 1991. His teams made seven appearances in the NCAA tournament, and for the first and second time ever, the Gators advanced to the College World Series in 1988 and 1991. In 11 seasons coaching the Gators, Arnold compiled an overall record of 434–244–2 (.640).

=== Lopez era: (1995–2000) ===
Andy Lopez took over the program in 1995, two seasons removed from leading the Pepperdine Waves of Pepperdine University to their only national championship in the 1992 College World Series. In his second season as Florida's head coach in 1996, he led the Gators to a 50-win season and the semifinals of the College World Series. In 2000 and 2001, however, the Gators were eliminated in the opening rounds of the NCAA tournament, and Lopez was replaced. In seven seasons, Lopez posted an overall record of 278–159–1 (.636).

=== McMahon era: (2001–2007) ===
Pat McMahon became Florida's baseball coach in 2001, after coaching the Mississippi State Bulldogs for the four preceding seasons.

Early in the 2003 season, the Gators began to make a comeback with several freshly scouted prospects, including Andy Ramirez (first base) David Headage (right field), and Randy Thompson (shortstop). The 2003 season set the standard for the next two years of baseball, entering the NCAA tournament in both the 2003 and 2004 seasons. The 2005 season was the best in school history, as the team won the SEC championship and advanced to the College World Series for the first time in seven years, ultimately losing to the Texas Longhorns, two games to none in the final championship round of the Series.

The expectations for the Gators were high in 2006; they were the consensus No. 1 team in the preseason polls, but the team struggled through the 2006 season. The Gators found themselves one game under .500 (26–27) heading into their final series against the LSU Tigers in Gainesville. The team surprisingly won two of the three games to finish the season at .500 (28–28). The Gators' 10–20 SEC record was the second worst in the conference, and they did not qualify for the SEC Tournament, nor were they selected for the NCAA regionals.

After missing the NCAA regionals again in 2007, McMahon was fired on June 7, 2007. McMahon finished his six seasons as the Gators' head coach with an overall record of 202–113–1 (.641).

=== O'Sullivan era: (2008–present) ===
Kevin O'Sullivan became the head coach of the Florida baseball team following the 2007 season. In each of his first four seasons, O'Sullivan's Gators improved their overall record and SEC standing. In 2008, his first season as the Gators' skipper, the team finished 34–24 overall, 17–13 in SEC play, and in second place in the SEC Eastern Division standings. In 2009, the Gators compiled an overall record of 42–22, 19–11 in the SEC, and in first place in the SEC Eastern Division. O'Sullivan's 2010 Gators finished with an overall win–loss record of 47–17, 22–8 in SEC play, and SEC regular season champions. In each of his first three seasons, his Gators also showed post-season improvement, too: early elimination in the NCAA regional in 2008; progressing to the NCAA Super Regional in 2009; and a berth in the College World Series in 2010.

In 2011, Florida finished the regular season 41–15 overall, 22–8 in the SEC, and SEC regular season co-champions—sharing the regular season conference title with the South Carolina Gamecocks and Vanderbilt Commodores. After defeating the Mississippi State Bulldogs, Alabama Crimson Tide, Georgia Bulldogs and Vanderbilt Commodores to win the SEC tournament, the Gators received the overall No. 2 seed in the sixty-four team NCAA tournament. The Gators swept the NCAA regional three games to none, and beat the Mississippi State Bulldogs two games to one in the NCAA Super Regional, and advanced to the 2011 College World Series. By beating the seventh-seeded Texas Longhorns 8–4 in the opening game of the 2011 Series, and then defeating the sixth-seeded Vanderbilt Commodores twice, 3–1 and 6–4, the Gators earned a berth in the best-of-three College World Series championship finals. In the championship finals, the South Carolina Gamecocks defeated the Gators in two straight games, 2–1 and 5–2; the Gators finished the 2011 season with an overall record of 53–19—the most games the Gators have ever won in a single season.

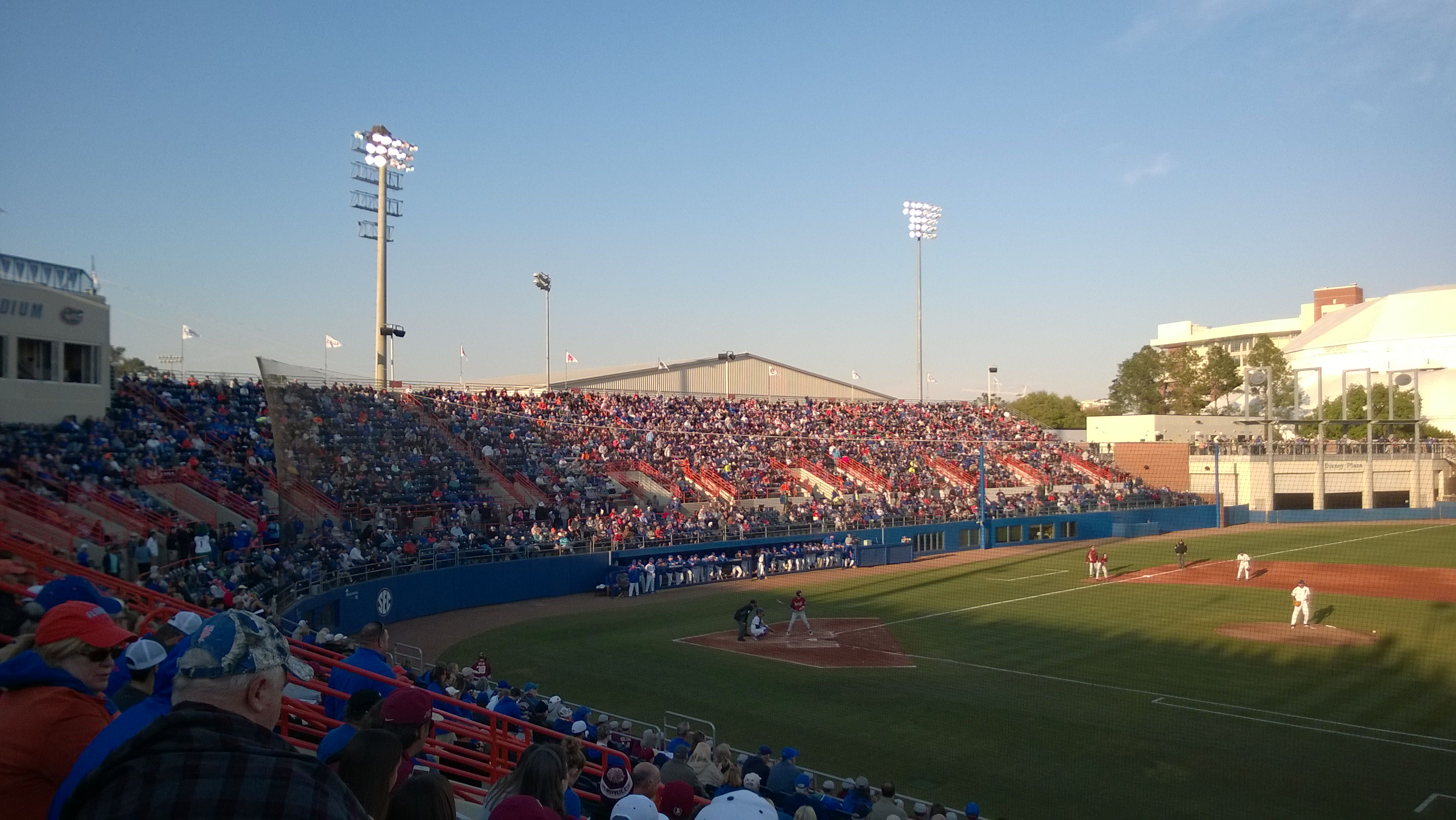
A sell-out crowd watches the Gators face the Florida State Seminoles in 2018.

Florida finished the 2012 regular season with a record of 40–16, and were selected as the No. 1 seed in the 2012 NCAA Division I baseball tournament. Jonathon Crawford pitched the seventh no-hitter in NCAA tournament history against the Bethune-Cookman Wildcats in the opening round of the Gainesville Regional. The Gators swept the double-elimination regional tournament in three straight wins over Bethune-Cookman (4–0) and the Georgia Tech Yellow Jackets (6–1, 15–3), and then swept the NC State Wolfpack in two straight games to win the best-of-three Gainesville Super Regional (7–1, 9–8) and earn a bid to the 2012 College World Series. The 2012 season came to an abrupt end in the College World Series, as the Gators lost their first two games to the South Carolina Gamecocks 7–3 and the Kent State Golden Flashes 5–4.

Florida returned to the College World Series for the ninth time in 2015 and for the tenth time in 2016. The Gators made their 11th College World Series in 2017, finally breaking through and winning their first national championship after sweeping LSU two games to none in the championship series. They returned to the College World Series in 2018 to defend their title, but fell to Arkansas in the semifinals. After an up-and-down 2019 campaign, the 2020 Gators got off to a school-best 16–1 start before the remainder of the season was cancelled due to the COVID-19 pandemic.

== Stadium facilities ==
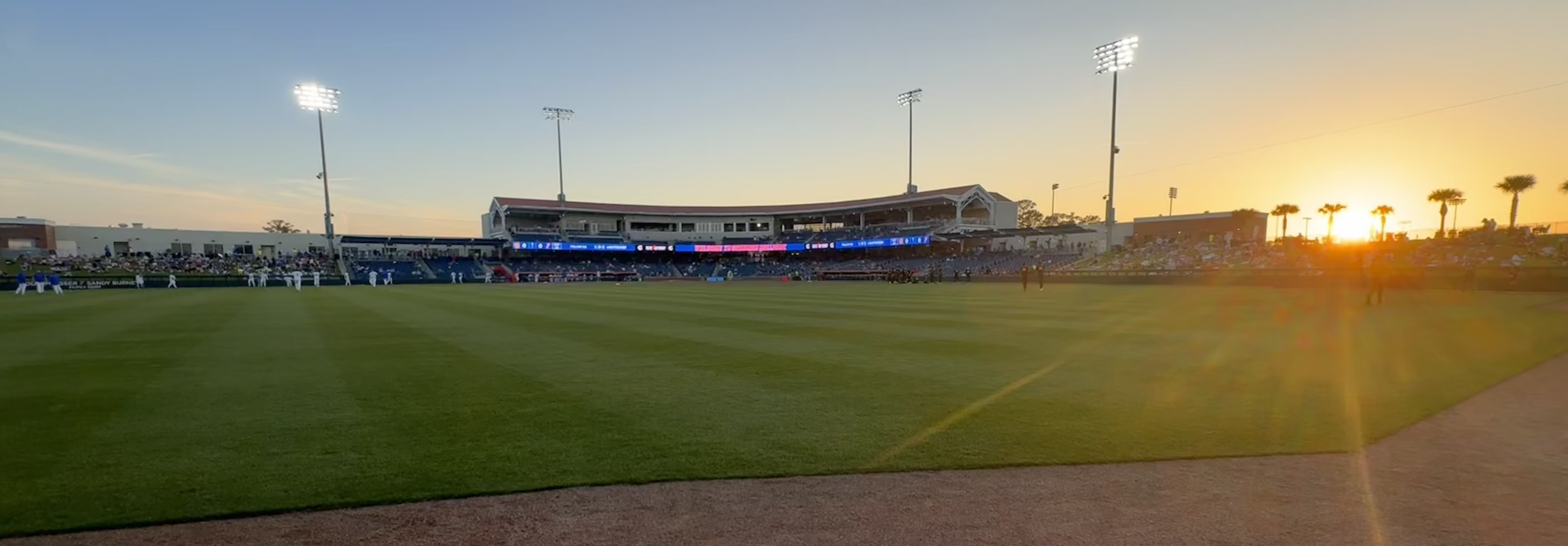
Condron Ballpark at Alfred A. McEthan Field

Condron Ballpark at Alfred A. McKethan Field is the home field for the Florida baseball team. The playing surface is named for Florida alumnus Alfred A. McKethan and is located on the University of Florida's Gainesville campus. The stadium includes seating for approximately 7,000 fans (expandable to 10,000), a press box, locker rooms and coaching staff offices. The ballpark replaced Alfred A. McKethan Stadium at Perry Field after the 2020 season.

Home plate faces northeast with the sun behind the stadium to provide shade for fans. A 360-degree open concourse allows fans a constant field view. Permanent chairback seats accommodate 4,000 spectators, with 700 club seats, berm capacity of over 2,000, and an option to temporarily expand capacity to around 10,000. The new ballpark is adjacent to Pressly Softball Stadium and Dizney Stadium for lacrosse. McKethan Stadium was demolished to make way for the James W. "Bill" Heavener Complex, a football training facility.

== Head coaches ==
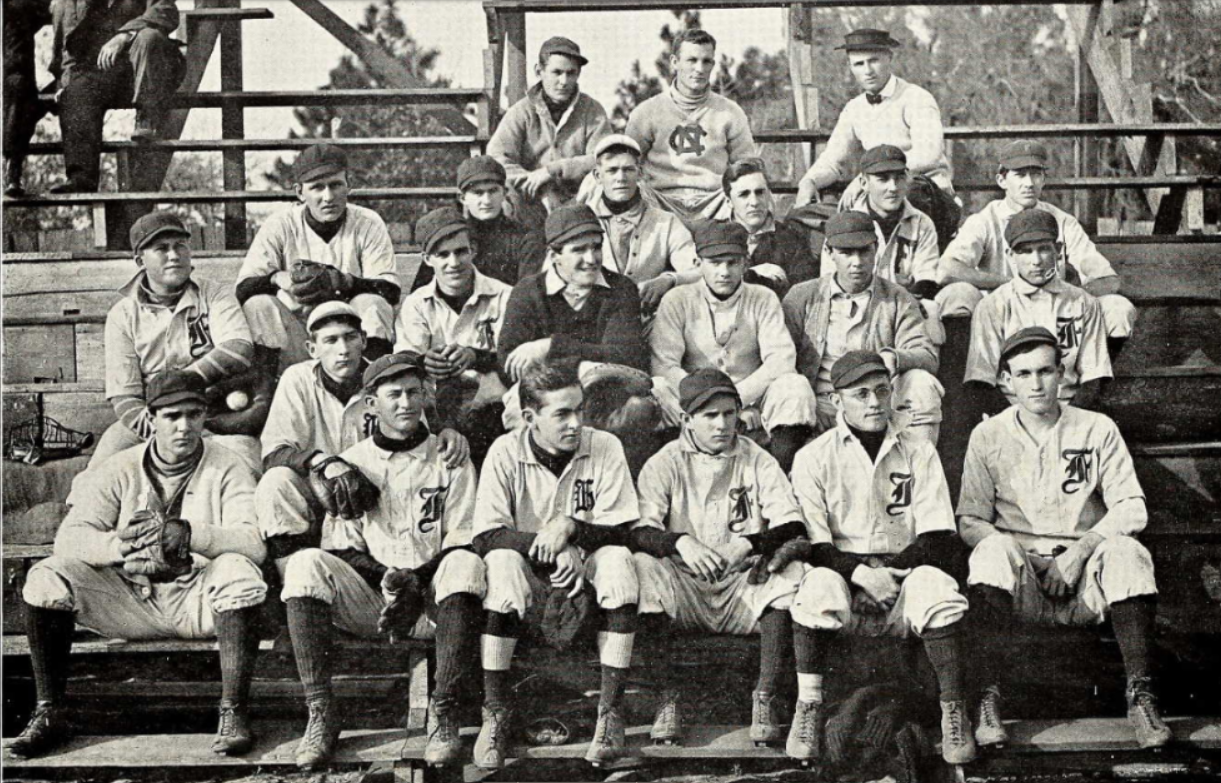
1911 team

Year(s)	Coach	Seasons	W–L–T	Pct
1911	Dougal M. Buie	1	?	
1912	H. D. McLeod	1	9–4–2	.667
1913	R. P. Hoffman	1	11–9–1	.548
1914–1916	Pat Flaherty	3	15–28–1	.352
1917	Hugh Wicher	1	8–3–0	.727
1919–1920	Artie Phelan	2	14–16–1	.468
1921	William G. Kline	1	4–10–0	.300
1922–1923, 1926	Lance Richbourg	3	39–21–0	.650
1924	Rex Farrior	1	5–14–0	.263
1925	James L. White	1	3–6–0	.333
1927–1933	Brady Cowell	7	61–65–2	.484
1934–1936	Ben Clemons	3	20–29–1	.410
1937–1939	Lewie Hardage	3	35–24–1	.592
1940–1942, 1946–1947	Sam J. McAllister	5	40–56–4	.420
1945	Bob Pitman	1	2–9–0	.182
1948–1975	Dave Fuller	28	556–356–6	.609
1976–1981	Jay Bergman	6	217–113–0	.658
1982–1983	Jack Rhine	2	72–39–1	.647
1984–1994	Joe Arnold	11	434–244–2	.640
1995–2001	Andy Lopez	7	278–159–1	.636
2002–2007	Pat McMahon	6	231–143–1	.617
2008–present	Kevin O'Sullivan	18	756–371–0	.671
Totals	21	111	2,825–1,712–24	.622

== Year-by-year results ==
Year	Coach	Record	Notes
1912	H. D. McLeod	9–4–2	
1913	R. P. Hoffman	11–9–1	
1914	Pat Flaherty	2–8	
1915	Pat Flaherty	4–6–1	
1916	Pat Flaherty	9–15	
1917	Hugh Wicher	8–3	
No games played in 1918 due to World War I
1919	Artie Phelan	7–5	
1920	Artie Phelan	7–11–1	
1921	William Kline	4–10	
1922	Lance Richbourg	15–5	
1923	Lance Richbourg	10–9	
1924	Rex Farrior	5–14	
1925	James White	3–6	
1926	Lance Richbourg	14–7	
1927	Brady Cowell	8–14	
1928	Brady Cowell	6–14–1	
1929	Brady Cowell	4–9	
1930	Brady Cowell	9–8	
1931	Brady Cowell	11–10	
1932	Brady Cowell	12–8	
1933	Brady Cowell	11–2–1	
1934	Ben Clemons	6–7	
1935	Ben Clemons	7–13–1	
1936	Ben Clemons	7–9	
1937	Lee Hardage	10–7–1	
1938	Lee Hardage	14–9	
1939	Lee Hardage	11–8	
1940	Sam J. McAllister	8–11	
1941	Sam J. McAllister	8–7	
1942	Sam J. McAllister	6–6	
No games played in 1943–44 due to World War II
1945	Bob Pittman	2–9	
1946	Sam J. McAllister	4–17–2	
1947	Sam J. McAllister	14–15	
1948	Dave Fuller	10–14–1	
1949	Dave Fuller	17–13	
1950	Dave Fuller	20–9	
1951	Dave Fuller	16–9	
1952	Dave Fuller	21–4–2	
1953	Dave Fuller	13–7–1	
1954	Dave Fuller	12–10	
1955	Dave Fuller	20–4	
1956	Dave Fuller	13–11	
1957	Dave Fuller	17–7	
1958	Dave Fuller	17–7	Eliminated in Regionals
1959	Dave Fuller	13–8	
1960	Dave Fuller	18–14	Eliminated in Regionals
1961	Dave Fuller	9–9	
1962	Dave Fuller	Eliminated in Regionals	
1963	Dave Fuller	25–10–1	
1964	Dave Fuller	30–9	
1965	Dave Fuller	23–11	
1966	Dave Fuller	20–13	
1967	Dave Fuller	29–8	
1968	Dave Fuller	25–13	
1969	Dave Fuller	28–17	
1970	Dave Fuller	27–17	
1971	Dave Fuller	19–26	
1972	Dave Fuller	23–21	
1973	Dave Fuller	23–21	
1974	Dave Fuller	23–20–1	
1975	Dave Fuller	23–25	
1976	Jay Bergman	21–27	
1977	Jay Bergman	39–18	Eliminated in Regionals
1978	Jay Bergman	34–15	
1979	Jay Bergman	40–20	Eliminated in Regionals
1980	Jay Bergman	40–16	
1981	Jay Bergman	42–17	Eliminated in Regionals
1982	Jack Rhine	34–25–1	Eliminated in Regionals
1983	Jack Rhine	38–14	
1984	Joe Arnold	43–16–1	Eliminated in Regionals
1985	Joe Arnold	43–18	Eliminated in Regionals
1986	Joe Arnold	27–26	
1987	Joe Arnold	32–24	
1988	Joe Arnold	48–19–1	Eliminated in CWS
1989	Joe Arnold	44–22	Eliminated in Regionals
1990	Joe Arnold	29–30	
1991	Joe Arnold	51–21	CWS Semifinals
1992	Joe Arnold	44–20	Eliminated in Regionals
1993	Joe Arnold	33–25	
1994	Joe Arnold	40–23	Eliminated in Regionals
1995	Andy Lopez	32–24	
1996	Andy Lopez	50–18	CWS Semifinals
1997	Andy Lopez	40–24	Eliminated in Regionals
1998	Andy Lopez	46–18	Eliminated in CWS
1999	Andy Lopez	31–25	
2000	Andy Lopez	44–23–1	Eliminated in Regionals
2001	Andy Lopez	35–27	Eliminated in Regionals
2002	Pat McMahon	46–19	Eliminated in Regionals
2003	Pat McMahon	37–21–1	Eliminated in Regionals
2004	Pat McMahon	43–22	Eliminated in Regionals
2005	Pat McMahon	48–23	CWS Championship Series
2006	Pat McMahon	28–28	
2007	Pat McMahon	29–30	
2008	Kevin O'Sullivan	34–24	Eliminated in Regionals
2009	Kevin O'Sullivan	42–22	Eliminated in Super Regionals
2010	Kevin O'Sullivan	47–17	Eliminated in CWS
2011	Kevin O'Sullivan	53–19	CWS Championship Series
2012	Kevin O'Sullivan	47–20	Eliminated in CWS
2013	Kevin O'Sullivan	29–30	Eliminated in Regionals
2014	Kevin O'Sullivan	40–23	Eliminated in Regionals
2015	Kevin O'Sullivan	52–18	CWS Semifinals
2016	Kevin O'Sullivan	52–16	Eliminated in CWS
2017	Kevin O'Sullivan	52–19	College World Series Champions
2018	Kevin O'Sullivan	49–21	CWS Semifinals
2019	Kevin O'Sullivan	34–26	Eliminated in Regionals
2020	Kevin O'Sullivan	16–1	Remainder of season canceled due to COVID-19 pandemic
2021	Kevin O'Sullivan	38–22	Eliminated in Regionals
2022	Kevin O'Sullivan	42–24	Eliminated in Regionals
2023	Kevin O'Sullivan	54–17	CWS Championship Series
2024	Kevin O'Sullivan	36–30	CWS Semifinals
2025	Kevin O'Sullivan	39–22	Eliminated in Regionals
2026	Kevin O'Sullivan	41–21	Eliminated in Regionals

== College World Series appearances ==
The Florida Gators have reached the College World Series 14 different times, including three consecutive trips from 2010 to 2012 and four consecutive trips from 2015 to 2018 under Kevin O'Sullivan.

Season	Coach	Record	Results
1988	Joe Arnold	48–19–1	Lost to Wichita State, def. California, eliminated by Arizona State
1991	Joe Arnold	51–21	Lost to LSU, def. Florida State, def. Fresno State, eliminated by LSU
1996	Andy Lopez	50–18	Def. Florida State, lost to LSU, def. Florida State, eliminated by LSU
1998	Andy Lopez	46–18	Lost to Mississippi State, eliminated by USC
2005	Pat McMahon	48–23	Def. Tennessee, def. Nebraska, def. Arizona State; lost to Texas two games to none in the CWS Championship Series
2010	Kevin O'Sullivan	47–17	Lost to UCLA, eliminated by Florida State
2011	Kevin O'Sullivan	53–19	Def. Texas, def. Vanderbilt twice; lost to South Carolina two games to none in the CWS Championship Series
2012	Kevin O'Sullivan	47–20	Lost to South Carolina, eliminated by Kent State
2015	Kevin O'Sullivan	52–18	Def. Miami (FL), lost to Virginia, def. Miami (FL), def. Virginia, eliminated by Virginia
2016	Kevin O'Sullivan	52–16	Lost to Coastal Carolina, eliminated by Texas Tech
2017	Kevin O'Sullivan	52–19	Def. TCU, def. Louisville, lost to TCU, def. TCU, def. LSU two games to none in the CWS Championship Series
2018	Kevin O'Sullivan	49–21	Lost to Texas Tech, def. Texas, def. Texas Tech, eliminated by Arkansas
2023	Kevin O'Sullivan	54–17	Def. Virginia, def. Oral Roberts, def. TCU, lost to LSU two games to one in the CWS Championship Series
2024	Kevin O'Sullivan	36–30	Lost to Texas A&M, def. NC State, def. Kentucky, eliminated by Texas A&M
Total NCAA College World Series appearances: 14

== Florida in the NCAA tournament ==
- The NCAA Division I baseball tournament started in 1947.
- The format of the tournament has changed through the years.

Season	Record	Percentage	Results
1958	2–2	.500	Eliminated by Clemson
1960	2–2	.500	Eliminated by North Carolina
1962	1–3	.250	Eliminated by Florida State
1977	2–2	.500	Eliminated by Minnesota
1979	2–2	.500	Eliminated by Delaware
1981	3–2	.600	Coral Gables Regional: Eliminated by Miami (FL) in the Regional Finals
1982	0–2	.000	Eliminated by Stetson
1984	0–2	.000	Eliminated by South Alabama
1985	3–2	.600	Coral Gables Regional: Eliminated by Miami (FL) in the Regional Finals
1988	1–2	.333	Tallahassee Regional: Won over George Mason, Tulane, Florida State, and Stetson; College World Series: Eliminated by Arizona State
1989	1–2	.333	Eliminated by Miami (FL)
1991	2–2	.500	Gainesville Regional: Won over Furman, Jacksonville and NC State; College World Series: Eliminated by LSU
1992	1–2	.333	Eliminated by Texas A&M
1994	3–2	.600	Coral Gables Regional: Eliminated by Miami (FL) in the Regional Finals
1996	2–2	.500	Gainesville Regional: Won over Bucknell, NC State, South Florida and UMass; College World Series: Eliminated by LSU
1997	2–2	.500	Coral Gables Regional: Eliminated by Miami (FL) in the Regional Finals
1998	8–2	.800	Gainesville Regional: Won over Monmouth, Richmond, Wake Forest and Illinois; College World Series: Lost to Mississippi State and USC
2000	3–2	.600	Waco Regional: Lost to San Jose State, defeated Baylor and Southwest Texas State, lost to San Jose State in the Regional Finals (1–1)
2001	1–2	.333	Coral Gables Regional: Defeated Stetson, lost to Miami (FL), eliminated by Stetson
2002	3–2	.600	Gainesville Regional: Defeated Bethune–Cookman, lost to Miami (FL), defeated Bethune Cookman, Eliminated by Miami (FL) in the Regional Finals (1–1)
2003	3–2	.600	Coral Gables Regional: Lost to Florida Atlantic, defeated Bethune–Cookman and Florida Atlantic, eliminated by Miami (FL) in the Regional Finals (1–1)
2004	3–2	.600	Oklahoma City Regional: Won over Central Connecticut and UCLA; Coral Gables Super Regional: Lost to Miami (FL) (0–2)
2005	8–3	.727	Gainesville Regional: Won over Stetson, North Carolina and Notre Dame; Gainesville Super Regional: Won over Florida State (2–0); College World Series: Defeated Tennessee, Nebraska and Arizona State, College World Series Finals: Lost to Texas in the Championship Series (0–2).
2008	0–2	.000	Tallahassee Regional: Lost to Tulane and Florida State
2009	3–2	.600	Gainesville Regional: Won over Bethune–Cookman and Miami (FL); Gainesville Super Regional: Lost to Southern Miss (0–2)
2010	5–2	.714	Gainesville Regional: Won over Bethune–Cookman, Oregon State and Florida Atlantic; Gainesville Super Regional: Won over Miami (FL) (2–0); College World Series: Lost to UCLA and Florida State in the College World Series
2011	8–3	.727	Gainesville Regional: Won over Manhattan and Miami (FL); Gainesville Super Regional: Won over Mississippi State (2–1); College World Series: Defeated Texas and Vanderbilt, College World Series Finals: Lost to South Carolina in the Championship Series (0–2)
2012	5–2	.714	Gainesville Regional: Won over Bethune–Cookman and Georgia Tech; Gainesville Super Regional: Won over NC State (2–0); College World Series: Lost to South Carolina and Kent State
2013	0–2	.000	Bloomington Regional: Lost to Austin Peay and Valparaiso
2014	0–2	.000	Gainesville Regional: Lost to College of Charleston and North Carolina
2015	8–2	.800	Gainesville Regional: Won over Florida A&M, South Florida, and Florida Atlantic; Gainesville Super Regional: Won over Florida State (2–0); College World Series: Defeated Miami (FL) twice, eliminated by Virginia two games to one
2016	5–3	.625	Gainesville Regional: Won over Bethune–Cookman, Connecticut, and Georgia Tech; Gainesville Super Regional: Won over Florida State (2–1); College World Series: Lost to Coastal Carolina and Texas Tech
2017	10–3	.769	Gainesville Regional: Won over Marist and South Florida, defeated Bethune–Cookman in the Regional Finals (1–1); Gainesville Super Regional: Won over Wake Forest (2–1); College World Series: Defeated TCU and Louisville College World Series Finals: defeated LSU in the Championship Series (2–0)
2018	7–4	.636	Gainesville Regional: Won over Columbia and Jacksonville, defeated Florida Atlantic in the Regional Finals (1–1); Gainesville Super Regional: Won over Auburn (2–1); College World Series: Lost to Texas Tech, defeated Texas and Texas Tech, eliminated by Arkansas in the national semifinals
2019	1–2	.333	Lubbock Regional: Lost to Dallas Baptist, defeated Army, eliminated by Dallas Baptist
2021	0–2	.000	Gainesville Regional: Lost to South Florida and South Alabama
2022	3–2	.600	Gainesville Regional: Won over Central Michigan, lost to Oklahoma, won over Central Michigan, eliminated by Oklahoma in the Regional Finals (1–1)
2023	10–3	.769	Gainesville Regional: Won over Florida A&M, lost to Texas Tech, won over Connecticut, defeated Texas Tech in the Regional Finals (2–0); Gainesville Super Regional: Won over South Carolina (2–0); College World Series: Won over Virginia, Won over Oral Roberts, Won over TCU College World Series Finals: Lost to LSU in the Championship Series (1–2)
2024	8–3	.727	Stillwater Regional: Won over Nebraska, lost to Oklahoma State, won over Nebraska, defeated Oklahoma State in the Regional Finals (2–0); Clemson Super Regional: Won over Clemson (2–0); College World Series: Lost to Texas A&M, won over NC State, won over Kentucky, eliminated by Texas A&M
2025	1–2	.333	Conway Regional: Lost to East Carolina, won over Fairfield, eliminated by East Carolina
2026	2–2	.500	Gainesville Regional: Won over Rider and Miami (FL), eliminated by Troy in the Regional Finals (0–2)
Total NCAA tournament Appearances: 41

== Championships ==
=== National championships ===
Florida won its first national championship in 2017, sweeping rival LSU in the CWS Championship Series to emerge victorious in the school's third CWS Finals appearance.

Season	Coach	Site	Opponent	Game 1	Game 2	Game 3	CWS MOP	Overall record	SEC record
2017	Kevin O'Sullivan	Omaha	LSU	W, 4–3	W, 6–1	—	Alex Faedo	52–19	21–9
Total NCAA National Championships: 1

The Gators have also reached the College World Series Championship Series three additional times.

Season	Coach	Site	Opponent	Game 1	Game 2	Game 3	CWS MOP	Overall record	SEC record
2005	Pat McMahon	Omaha	Texas	L, 2–4	L, 2–6	—	David Maroul	48–23	20–10
2011	Kevin O'Sullivan	Omaha	South Carolina	L, 1–2^{11}	L, 2–5	—	Scott Wingo	53–19	22–8
2023	Kevin O'Sullivan	Omaha	LSU	L, 4–5^{11}	W, 24–4	L, 4–18	Paul Skenes	54–17	20–10
Total NCAA runner-up finishes: 3

=== SEC regular season championships ===
The Gators have won a total of 16 SEC regular season championships, second most among the 14 current SEC members. Their most recent title came in 2023 under Kevin O'Sullivan.

Season	Coach	Overall record	SEC record
1952	Dave Fuller	21–4–2	12–2–1
1956	Dave Fuller	20–4	13–3
1962	Dave Fuller	25–10–1	14–3
1981	Jay Bergman	42–17	16–7
1982	Jack Rhyne	34–25–1	14–8
1984	Joe Arnold	43–16–1	18–4
1988	Joe Arnold	48–19–1	21–6
1996	Andy Lopez	50–18	20–10
1998	Andy Lopez	46–18	21–8
2005	Pat McMahon	48–23	20–10
2010	Kevin O'Sullivan	47–17	22–8
2011	Kevin O'Sullivan	53–19	22–8
2014	Kevin O'Sullivan	40–23	21–9
2017	Kevin O'Sullivan	52–19	21–9
2018	Kevin O'Sullivan	49–21	20–10
2023	Kevin O'Sullivan	54–17	20–10
SEC regular season championships:			16

=== SEC Tournament championships ===
The Gators have won seven SEC Tournament championships, third most among the SEC's current 14 members. However, after winning five in 11 years from 1981 to 1991, it was 20 years before Kevin O'Sullivan led the Gators to their sixth SEC Tournament Championship in 2011.

Season	Coach	Opponent	Score	Site	Overall record	SEC record	Tournament record
1981	Jay Bergman	Kentucky	11–5	Starkville, MS	42–17	16–7	3–0
1982	Jack Rhyne	Tennessee	9–3	Gainesville, FL	34–25–1	14–8	3–1
1984	Joe Arnold	Tennessee	3–1	Gainesville, FL	43–16–1	18–4	3–1
1988	Joe Arnold	Mississippi State	5–3	Starkville, MS	48–19–1	21–6	4–1
1991	Joe Arnold	Louisiana State	8–4	Baton Rouge, LA	51–21	16–8	4–0
2011	Kevin O'Sullivan	Vanderbilt	5–0	Hoover, AL	53–19	22–8	4–1
2015	Kevin O'Sullivan	Vanderbilt	7–3	Hoover, AL	52–18	19–11	4–1
SEC Tournament championships:							7

== Player awards ==
=== National awards ===
- Dick Howser Trophy

Mike Zunino (2012)
Brady Singer (2018)

- Golden Spikes Award

Mike Zunino (2012)

- Baseball America College Player of the Year Award

Mike Zunino (2012)

- Rotary Smith Award

Brad Wilkerson (1998)

- Senior CLASS Award

Brandon McArthur (2009)

- John Olerud Award

Brian Johnson (2012)
Jac Caglione (2024)

- Collegiate Baseball Freshman Player of the Year

JJ Schwarz (2015)

=== SEC Awards ===
- Player of the Year

Matt LaPorta (2005, 2007)
Mike Zunino (2011)

- Pitcher of the Year

Justin Hoyman (2004)
Brady Singer (2018)
Aidan King (2026)

- Freshman of the Year

Preston Tucker (2009)
Austin Maddox (2010)
Austin Cousino (2012)
Logan Shore (2014)

== Florida's first Team All-Americans ==
Player	Position	Year(s)	Selectors
Bernie Parrish	Second Base	1958†	ABCA
Perry McGriff	First Base	1959†	ABCA
Tom Moore	Third Base	1962†, 1963†	ABCA, BA
Marc Sullivan	Catcher	1979	SN
Rodney Brewer	First Base	1987	SN
John Burke	Pitcher	1991	BA
David Eckstein	Second Base	1996	NCBWA
Brad Wilkerson	UT/ATH	1996, 1997, 1998†	NCBWA, BA, CB
Josh Fogg	Pitcher	1998†	BA, CB
Justin Hoyman	Pitcher	2004	ABCA, CB
Matt LaPorta	First Base	2005†, 2007	ABCA, BA, CB, NCBWA
Mike Zunino	Catcher	2011†, 2012†	ABCA, BA, CB, NCBWA
Brian Johnson	Utility player	2012	NCBWA
Source:"SEC All-Americas". secsports.com. Archived from the original on 2008-05-28. ABCA: American Baseball Coaches Association BA: Baseball America CB: Collegiate Baseball NCBWA: National Collegiate Baseball Writers Association SN: Sporting News † Denotes consensus All-American

== Former players in Major League Baseball ==
Many former Florida Gator baseball players have gone on to play in Major League Baseball and other professional leagues. As of 2015, over 170 UF alumni have been chosen in the Major League Baseball draft and over 60 players have appeared in a Major League game. The first was Lance Richbourg, who made his MLB debut with the Philadelphia Phillies in 1921. Other notable alumni include 1953 American League MVP Al Rosen, 2006 World Series MVP David Eckstein, 2019 All-MLB First Team Pete Alonso, 2021 NL Rookie of the Year Jonathan India, 2021 Gold Glove Award winner Harrison Bader, and former Boston Red Sox managing general partner Haywood Sullivan.

== See also ==
- Florida Gators
- List of Florida Gators baseball players
- List of NCAA Division I baseball programs
- List of University of Florida Olympians
