= Amherst Audubon Field =

College baseball stadium

- Interactive map of Amherst Audubon Field
- Location: Amherst, New York, United States
- Coordinates: 42°59′40.5″N 78°46′51.8″W
- Owner: University at Buffalo
- Operator: University at Buffalo
- Capacity: 500
- Scoreboard: Electronic
- Field size: 330 feet (RF and LF), 380 feet (gaps), 400 feet (center)

Construction
- Groundbreaking: 2000
- Built: 2001
- Renovated: 2002, 2003
- Closed: 2021

Tenant
- Buffalo Bulls (NCAA) (2001–2017)

Amherst Audubon Field was a baseball field located on the campus of the University at Buffalo in Amherst, New York, United States. The field was built as the home of the Buffalo Bulls baseball team, which competed in the National Collegiate Athletic Association (NCAA) at the Division I level as a member of the Mid-American Conference (MAC) until 2017.

The Bulls played their home games at Dunn Tire Park in 2000. Construction of the field was completed in 2001 and it underwent major renovations in 2002 and 2003, which included an entirely new playing surface and drainage system.

In 2020, Ron Torgalski admitted to USA Today that, when he was serving as the Buffalo Bulls baseball coach and hosting visits from recruits, he hoped that they would not ask to see Audubon Field because of how dilapidated and unimpressive it was.

== See also ==
- List of NCAA Division I baseball venues
- UB Stadium
- Alumni Arena

Events and tenants
Preceded by Dunn Tire Park	Home of the Buffalo Bulls; 2001 – 2017	Succeeded by –
