= Joe Hesketh =

American baseball player (born 1959)

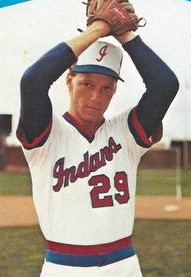
- Pitcher
- Born: February 15, 1959 (age 67); Lackawanna, New York, U.S.
- Batted: Left Threw: Left

MLB debut
- August 7, 1984, for the Montreal Expos

Last MLB appearance
- August 7, 1994, for the Boston Red Sox

MLB statistics
- Win–loss record: 60–47
- Earned run average: 3.78
- Strikeouts: 726
- Stats at Baseball Reference

Teams
- Montreal Expos (1984–1990); Atlanta Braves (1990); Boston Red Sox (1990–1994)

Joseph Thomas Hesketh (born February 15, 1959) is an American former professional baseball pitcher. He played in Major League Baseball from 1984 through 1994 for the Montreal Expos (1984–90), Atlanta Braves (1990) and Boston Red Sox (1990–94). Listed at 6' 2", 170 lb., Hesketh batted and threw left-handed. He was selected by the Expos in the 1980 draft out of the State University of New York at Buffalo.

One of the most dominant pitchers in UB history, Hesketh compiled an overall 1.77 ERA, including a notable 0.91 during his junior season. He also had 10 complete games for the Buffalo Bulls and pitched one of the greatest wins in school history – a 4–0 shutout against powerful St. John's team and future major league star Frank Viola. Hesketh also picked up the save in a victory on the road over nationally ranked University of Miami. In 1979, he played collegiate summer baseball with the Cotuit Kettleers of the Cape Cod Baseball League. After that, he earned the 1980 ECAC New York-New Jersey District Player of the Year honors, as his six shutouts for the Bulls remain a school record.

In 1984, Hesketh was named the American Association pitcher of the year after going 12–3 with a 3.05 ERA and 135 strikeouts in 147 2/3 innings for the Indianapolis Indians. He joined the Montreal Expos late in the season and ended with a 2–2, 1.80 ERA in 11 appearances. His debut on August 7 against the Philadelphia Phillies was unusual, in that he was called for a balk before he delivered his first pitch. In 1985 he was 10–5 with a 3.29 ERA in 25 starts, allowing just 125 hits in a career-high 155 1/3 innings into late August, but a home plate collision broke his leg and his season was over. He was considered in the National League Rookie of the Year vote. In 1986 he was bothered by an impinged nerve in his left shoulder, then missed virtually all of 1987. While Hesketh did bounce back to some extent as a reliever, he never completely recovered.

Hesketh was released by Montreal in April 1990. At least a half-dozen teams claimed him, so he ended up in Atlanta by virtue of the Braves' poor record. Although he had recorded five saves, the Braves released him after 31 appearances; the Boston Red Sox then signed him in late July.

In 1991, Hesketh came back of several injury-plagued seasons. He ended with a 12–4 mark in 39 games for Boston, including 17 starts and a career second-best 153 1/3 innings, as his .750 won-loss % topped American League pitchers. The next three years he divided his playing time as a starter, middle reliever, and occasional closer. He retired after the 1994 season.

In an 11-season career, Hesketh posted a 60–47 record with a 3.78 ERA in 339 appearances, including 114 starts, four complete games, two shutouts, 79 games finished, 21 saves, 726 strikeouts, 378 walks, and 961 2/3 innings of work.

Hesketh is a member of both the UB Athletic Hall of Fame (Class of ’86) as well as the Greater Buffalo Sports Hall of Fame (2002). In 2006, he was named the Bulls’ pitching coach by head coach Ron Torgalski. His tenure with the UB Bulls ended after the 2007–2008 season.

== Sources ==
- The Baseball Cube
- Baseball Reference
- Retrosheet
- University at Buffalo press release
- The Scouting Report: 1992, STATS INC./John Dewan and Don Zminda, editors. HarperPerennial publishers, 1992.
