= 2012 Kent State Golden Flashes baseball team =

American college baseball season

2012 Kent State Golden Flashes baseball

Eugene Super Regional champions Gary Regional Champions MAC Tournament champions MAC Champions
- Conference: Mid-American Conference
- Record: 47–20 (24–3 MAC)
- Head coach: Scott Stricklin (8th season)
- Assistant coaches: Mike Birkbeck (14th season); Scott Daeley (7th season); Doug Sanders
- Home stadium: Schoonover Stadium

2012 Mid-American Conference baseball standings
	Conf.				Overall
Team	W		L	PCT	W		L	PCT
East Division
Kent State ^{x}‍‍‡‍^{y}	24	–	3	.889	47	–	20	.701
Ohio ‍‍‍	16	–	11	.593	28	–	29	.491
Miami ‍‍‍	12	–	15	.444	30	–	29	.508
Buffalo ‍‍‍	10	–	16	.385	20	–	36	.357
Akron ‍‍‍	10	–	17	.370	17	–	38	.309
Bowling Green ‍‍‍	9	–	18	.333	20	–	33	.377
West Division
Toledo ^{x}‍‍‍	19	–	8	.704	30	–	27	.526
Central Michigan ‍‍‍	17	–	10	.630	34	–	29	.540
Western Michigan ‍‍‍	14	–	12	.538	26	–	29	.473
Eastern Michigan ‍‍‍	14	–	13	.519	25	–	31	.446
Ball State ‍‍‍	9	–	18	.333	14	–	36	.280
Northern Illinois ‍‍‍	7	–	20	.259	15	–	40	.273
x – Division champion ‡ – Tournament champion y – Invited to the 2012 NCAA Division I baseball tournament As of May 30, 2012; Rankings from Coaches' Poll

The 2012 Kent State Golden Flashes baseball team represented Kent State University in the 2012 NCAA Division I baseball season. The Golden Flashes were coached by 8th year head coach Scott Stricklin and played their home games at Schoonover Stadium. Kent State finished the regular season 37–17 overall and 24–3 in the Mid-American Conference (MAC) to win the MAC regular-season and East division titles, and the top seed in the 2012 Mid-American Conference baseball tournament. At the tournament, Kent State went 4–0 to win the tenth Mid-American Conference baseball tournament title in program history and advance to the 2012 NCAA Division I baseball tournament, the 12th appearance in team history.

In the NCAA tournament, the team went 3–0 in the Gary Regional at U.S. Steel Yard to claim the program's first regional championship, which included a 21-inning, 7–6 win over 12th-ranked Kentucky. The Flashes advanced to the Super Regional round against the 10th-ranked Oregon Ducks where they defeated the Ducks two games to one at PK Park to claim the first super regional championship and appearance in the College World Series in school history. At the 2012 College World Series the Golden Flashes fell to Arkansas in the opening round, but eliminated top-ranked Florida 5–4 in the elimination bracket. Kent State was eliminated in the second round by South Carolina. Kent State finished 1–2 at the College World Series, and 6–3 in the NCAA tournament.

The season featured a 21-game winning streak, which began with a 16–5 home win over Western Michigan on April 27, and ended with a 3–2 road loss to Oregon in the second game of the super regional series in Eugene, Oregon. Kent State finished the season with an overall record of 47–20 and tied for 5th nationally by virtue of their second-round elimination in the College World Series. They finished the season ranked in the top ten in all major polls.

== Roster ==
2012 Kent State Golden Flashes baseball team
Players
Coaches

#	Pos.	Name	B/T	Height	Weight	Year	Home town
1	INF	Jimmy Rider	R/R	5 ft 10 in (1.78 m)	170 lb (77 kg)	Sr	Venetia, PA
2	INF	Derek Toadvine	R/R	5 ft 11 in (1.8 m)	165 lb (75 kg)	So	Springfield, OH
4	INF	Cody Koch	R/	6 ft 2 in (1.88 m)	200 lb (91 kg)	So	Sandusky, OH
5	OF	T.J. Sutton	L/L	5 ft 10 in (1.78 m)	180 lb (82 kg)	Fr	Uniontown, OH
6	INF	George Roberts	R/R	6 ft 0 in (1.83 m)	195 lb (88 kg)	Jr	Summerhill, PA
7	INF	Nick Hamilton	s/R	6 ft 1 in (1.85 m)	190 lb (86 kg)	RS Jr	Avon Lake, OH
8	RHP	Josh Pierce	R/R	6 ft 1 in (1.85 m)	215 lb (98 kg)	RS Fr	Avon, OH
11	OF	Joe Koch	L/L	5 ft 8 in (1.73 m)	165 lb (75 kg)	RS Sr	Youngstown, OH
12	OF	Alex Miklos	R/R	5 ft 10 in (1.78 m)	184 lb (83 kg)	Fr	Grove City, PA
13	RHP	John Birkbeck	R/R	6 ft 2 in (1.88 m)	165 lb (75 kg)	Fr	Canton, OH
14	INF	Evan Campbell	L/R	6 ft 0 in (1.83 m)	170 lb (77 kg)	Jr	Beloit, OH
16	RHP	Eli Martin	R/R	6 ft 0 in (1.83 m)	155 lb (70 kg)	Fr	Dresden, OH
17	OF	Jacob Neuschaefer	R/R	5 ft 10 in (1.78 m)	170 lb (77 kg)	Fr	Elyria, OH
18	RHP	Dan Slavik	R/R	6 ft 1 in (1.85 m)	185 lb (84 kg)	So	St. Clairsville, OH
19	RHP	Ryan Bores	R/R	6 ft 3 in (1.91 m)	195 lb (88 kg)	Jr	Strongsville, OH
21	INF	Blake Bellman	S/R	5 ft 10 in (1.78 m)	185 lb (84 kg)	RS Fr	Wooster, OH
22	RHP	Casey Wilson	R/R	6 ft 1 in (1.85 m)	195 lb (88 kg)	Jr	Sagamore Hills, OH
23	C	Tommy Monnot	R/R	6 ft 4 in (1.93 m)	190 lb (86 kg)	Fr	Canton, OH
24	INF	Sawyer Polen	R/R	6 ft 0 in (1.83 m)	170 lb (77 kg)	Fr	Wooster, OH
25	OF	Troy Summers	R/R	6 ft 1 in (1.85 m)	185 lb (84 kg)	RS So	Minerva, OH
26	RHP	Chuck Seacrist	R/R	6 ft 0 in (1.83 m)	175 lb (79 kg)	Fr	Painesville, OH
27	C	Jeff Revesz	R/R	5 ft 10 in (1.78 m)	185 lb (84 kg)	Fr	Grove City, PA
28	RHP	Spencer Bryant	R/R	6 ft 2 in (1.88 m)	185 lb (84 kg)	So	Sandusky, OH
29	LHP	Michael Clark	L/L	6 ft 2 in (1.88 m)	180 lb (82 kg)	RS So	Akron, OH
30	LHP	Brian Clark	L/L	6 ft 3 in (1.91 m)	210 lb (95 kg)	Fr	Munroe Falls, OH
31	RHP	Tyler Skulina	R/R	6 ft 6 in (1.98 m)	235 lb (107 kg)	So	Strongsville, OH
32	RHP	Ryan Mace	R/R	6 ft 0 in (1.83 m)	190 lb (86 kg)	Sr	Tallmadge, OH
33	LHP	Tim Faix	L/L	6 ft 2 in (1.88 m)	185 lb (84 kg)	Fr	Strongsville, OH
34	C	Jason Bagoly	R/R	6 ft 3 in (1.91 m)	235 lb (107 kg)	Jr	Austintown, OH
36	C	David Lyon	S/R	5 ft 11 in (1.8 m)	205 lb (93 kg)	Sr	Emporium, PA
37	LHP	David Starn	L/L	6 ft 3 in (1.91 m)	190 lb (86 kg)	Sr	Hudson, OH
38	RHP	Jason Revesz	R/R	5 ft 7 in (1.7 m)	160 lb (73 kg)	Fr	Grove City, PA
39	RHP	Dan Kopcak	R/R	6 ft 0 in (1.83 m)	170 lb (77 kg)	RS Fr	Streetsboro, OH
40	RHP	Eric Dorsch	R/R	6 ft 7 in (2.01 m)	240 lb (109 kg)	RS Fr	Gibsonia, PA

Head coach

Scott Stricklin

Assistant coach(es)

Mike Birkbeck
Scott Daeley
Doug Sanders

Legend

- (C) Team captain
- (S) Suspended
- (I) Ineligible
- Injured
- Current redshirt

Roster
Last update: 2012-06-11

== Schedule ==
2012 Kent State Golden Flashes baseball game log
Regular season
February (4–2)

#	Date	Opponent	Site	Score	Overall	MAC
1	February 17	#9 Georgia Tech	Winthrop Ballpark • Rock Hill, SC	5–0	1–0	
2	February 18	#9 Georgia Tech	Winthrop Ballpark • Rock Hill, SC	2–6	1–1	
3	February 18	Winthrop	Winthrop Ballpark • Rock Hill, SC	11–3	2–1	
4	February 24	Lipscomb	Dugan Field • Nashville, TN	1–2	2–2	
5	February 25	Lipscomb	Dugan Field • Nashville, TN	16–3	3–2	
6	February 26	Lipscomb	Dugan Field • Nashville, TN	4–0	4–2	

March (9–10, 5–0)

#	Date	Opponent	Site	Score	Overall	MAC
7	March 3	Western Kentucky	Nick Denes Field • Bowling Green, KY	2–5	4–3	
8	March 4	Western Kentucky	Nick Denes Field • Bowling Green, KY	13–3	5–3	
9	March 5	Western Kentucky	Nick Denes Field • Bowling Green, KY	1–2	5–4	
10	March 9	New Mexico State	Presley Askew Field • Las Cruces, NM	7–4	6–4	
11	March 10	New Mexico State	Presley Askew Field • Las Cruces, NM	10–9	7–4	
12	March 11	New Mexico State	Presley Askew Field • Las Cruces, NM	6–12	7–5	
13	March 12	New Mexico State	Presley Askew Field • Las Cruces, NM	4–14	7–6	
14	March 16	Pepperdine	Eddy D. Field Stadium • Malibu, CA	2–0	8–6	
15	March 18	Pepperdine	Eddy D. Field Stadium • Malibu, CA	4–10	8–7	
16	March 19	Pepperdine	Eddy D. Field Stadium • Malibu, CA	4–6	8–8	
17	March 20	Fresno State	Pete Beiden Field • Fresno, CA	2–14	8–9	
18	March 21	Fresno State	Pete Beiden Field • Fresno, CA	2–5	8–10	
19	March 23	Northern Illinois	Schoonover Stadium • Kent, OH	12–6	9–10	1–0
20	March 24	Northern Illinois	Schoonover Stadium • Kent, OH	6–1	10–10	2–0
21	March 25	Northern Illinois	Schoonover Stadium • Kent, OH	5–3	11–10	3–0
22	March 27	Toledo	Schoonover Stadium • Kent, OH	3–4 (12)	11–11	3–0
23	March 28	Pittsburgh	Cost Field • Pittsburgh, PA	5–6	11–12	3–0
24	March 30	Ball State	Ball Diamond • Muncie, IN	7–4 (10)	12–12	4–0
25	March 31	Ball State	Ball Diamond • Muncie, IN	4–2 (11)	13–12	5–0

April (14–5, 10–3)

#	Date	Opponent	Site	Score	Overall	MAC
26	April 1	Ball State	Ball Diamond • Muncie, IN	18–2	14–12	6–0
27	April 3	Penn State	Schoonover Stadium • Kent, OH	7–9	14–13	6–0
28	April 4	Toledo	Schoonover Stadium • Kent, OH	8–4	15–13	6–0
29	April 6	Buffalo	Schoonover Stadium • Kent, OH	5–4	16–13	7–0
30	April 7	Buffalo	Schoonover Stadium • Kent, OH	6–3	17–13	8–0
31	April 8	Buffalo	Schoonover Stadium • Kent, OH	6–3	18–13	9–0
32	April 11	Youngstown State	Schoonover Stadium • Kent, OH	14–4	19–13	9–0
33	April 13	Bowling Green	Steller Field • Bowling Green, OH	5–6	19–14	9–1
34	April 14	Bowling Green	Steller Field • Bowling Green, OH	6–9	19–15	9–2
35	April 15	Bowling Green	Steller Field • Bowling Green, OH	31–20	20–15	10–2
36	April 17	Pittsburgh	Schoonover Stadium • Kent, OH	6–5	21–15	10–2
37	April 20	Central Michigan	Theunissen Stadium • Mt. Pleasant, MI	0–3	21–16	10–3
38	April 21	Central Michigan	Theunissen Stadium • Mt. Pleasant, MI	6–3	22–16	11–3
39	April 22	Central Michigan	Theunissen Stadium • Mt. Pleasant, MI	6–4	23–16	12–3
40	April 24	Niagara	Schoonover Stadium • Kent, OH	8–4	24–16	12–3
41	April 25	Penn State	Medlar Field • University Park, PA	4–6	24–17	12–3
42	April 27	Western Michigan	Schoonover Stadium • Kent, OH	16–5	25–17	13–3
43	April 28	Western Michigan	Schoonover Stadium • Kent, OH	4–0	26–17	14–3
44	April 29	Western Michigan	Schoonover Stadium • Kent, OH	7–1	27–17	15–3

May (10–0, 9–0)

#	Date	Opponent	Site	Score	Overall	MAC
45	May 4	Ohio	Bob Wren Stadium • Athens, OH	4–1	28–17	16–3
46	May 5	Ohio	Bob Wren Stadium • Athens, OH	8–1	29–17	17–3
47	May 6	Ohio	Bob Wren Stadium • Athens, OH	13–4	30–17	18–3
48	May 11	Miami	Schoonover Stadium • Kent, OH	3–0	31–17	19–3
49	May 12	Miami	Schoonover Stadium • Kent, OH	7–6	32–17	20–3
50	May 13	Miami	Schoonover Stadium • Kent, OH	10–4	33–17	21–3
51	May 15	Eastern Michigan	All Pro Freight Stadium • Avon, OH	8–7	34–17	21–3
52	May 17	Akron	Canal Park • Akron, OH	6–1	35–17	22–3
53	May 18	Akron	Schoonover Stadium • Kent, OH	15–2	36–17	23–3
54	May 19	Akron	Schoonover Stadium • Kent, OH	2–1	37–17	24–3

Postseason
MAC Tournament (4–0)

#	Date	Opponent	Site	Score	Overall	MAC Tournament
55	May 23	(8) Buffalo	All Pro Freight Stadium • Avon, OH	9–0	38–17	1–0
56	May 24	(4) Western Michigan	All Pro Freight Stadium • Avon, OH	12–3	39–17	2–0
57	May 25	(8) Buffalo	All Pro Freight Stadium • Avon, OH	8–3	40–17	3–0
58	May 26	(3) Central Michigan	All Pro Freight Stadium • Avon, OH	3–1	41–17	4–0

Gary Regional (3–0)

#	Date	Opponent	Site	Score	Overall	NCAAT
59	June 1	(2) Kentucky	U.S. Steel Yard • Gary, IN	7–6 (21)	42–17	1–0
60	June 2	(1) Purdue	U.S. Steel Yard • Gary, IN	7–3	43–17	2–0
61	June 3	(2) Kentucky	U.S. Steel Yard • Gary, IN	3–2	44–17	3–0

Eugene Super Regional (2–1)

#	Date	Opponent	Site	Score	Overall	Super Regional
62	June 9	#5 Oregon	PK Park • Eugene, OR	7–6	45–17	4–0
63	June 10	#5 Oregon	PK Park • Eugene, OR	2–3	45–18	4–1
64	June 11	#5 Oregon	PK Park • Eugene, OR	3–2	46–18	5–1

College World Series (1–2)

#	Date	Opponent	Site	Score	Overall	CWS
65	June 16	Arkansas	TD Ameritrade Park • Omaha, NE	1–8	46–19	0–1
66	June 18	Florida	TD Ameritrade Park • Omaha, NE	5–4	47–19	1–1
67	June 21	South Carolina	TD Ameritrade Park • Omaha, NE	1–4	47–20	1–2

== Rankings ==
Ranking movements Legend: ██ Increase in ranking ██ Decrease in ranking — = Not ranked
	Week																			
Poll	Pre	1	2	3	4	5	6	7	8	9	10	11	12	13	14	15	16	17	18	Final
Coaches'	—	—*	—	—	—	—	—	—	—	—	—	—	—	—	—	—	—	—	—	7
Baseball America	—	—	—	—	—	—	—	—	—	—	—	—	—	—	—	—	—	—	—	8
Collegiate Baseball^	—	—	—	—	—	—	—	—	—	—	—	—	—	—	27	25	13	8	—	6
NCBWA†	—	—	—	—	—	—	—	—	—	—	—	—	—	—	—	—	22	9	—	7

^ Collegiate Baseball ranked 40 teams in their preseason poll, but only ranked 30 teams weekly during the season.
† NCBWA ranks 30 teams in their preseason poll, but only ranks 25 teams weekly during the season.
* A new poll was not released for this week, so for comparison purposes, the previous week's ranking is inserted in this week's slot.
