= Broadview Arena =

Multi-purpose arena in Amherst, New York

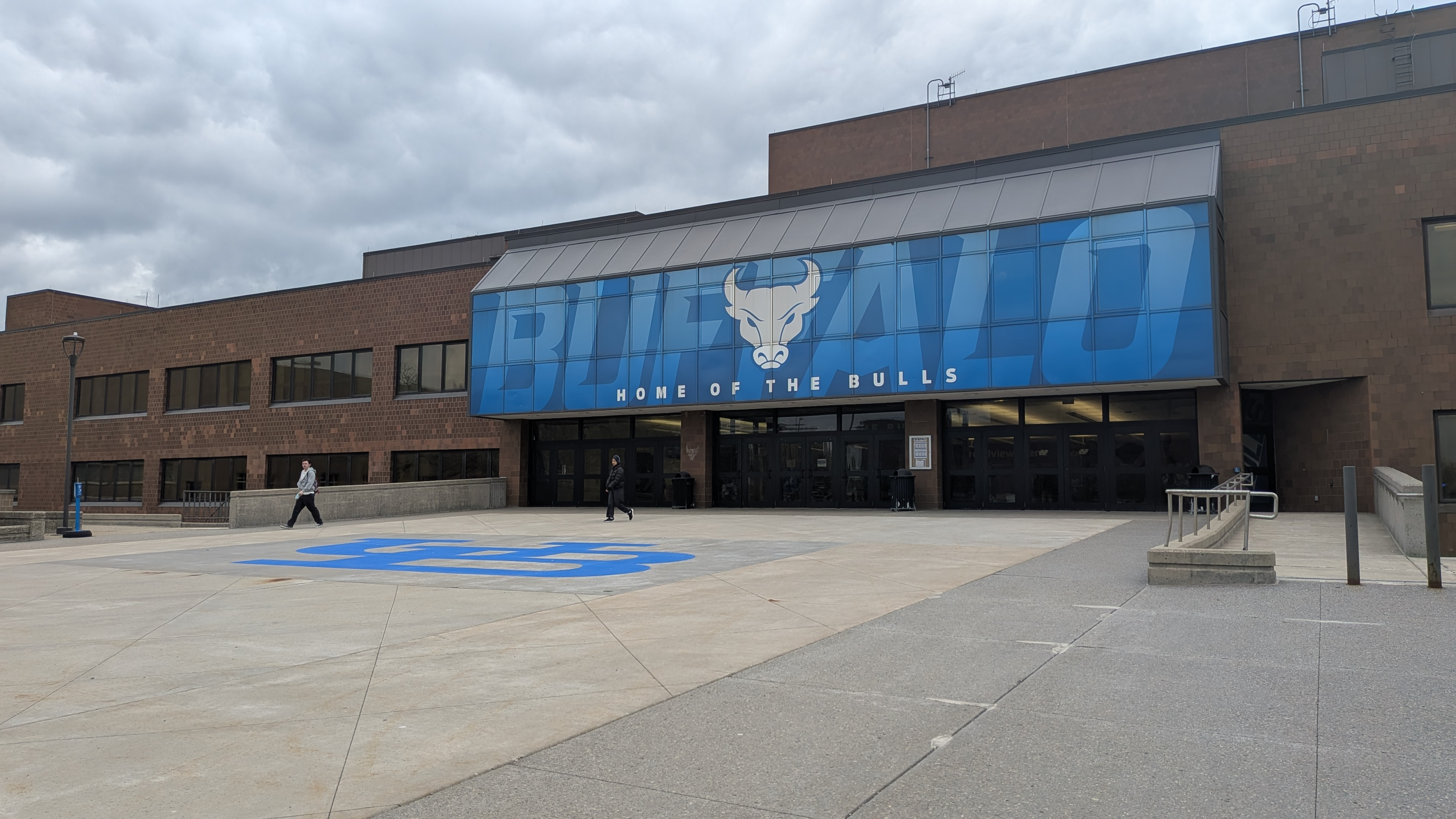
- Interactive map of Broadview Arena
- Former names: Alumni Arena (1982–2026)
- Location: 175 Webster Road; Amherst, NY 14221
- Coordinates: 43°00′00″N 78°46′52″W
- Owner: University at Buffalo
- Operator: University at Buffalo
- Capacity: 6,783
- Surface: Multi-surface

Construction
- Groundbreaking: 1978
- Opened: December 3, 1982
- Cost: $26.309 million ($87.8 million in 2025 dollars)
- Architect: Robert Trayham Coles
- Structural engineers: Sargent Webster Crenshaw & Folley

Tenants
- Buffalo Bulls (men's and women's Basketball) (NCAA)

Broadview Arena (formerly Alumni Arena) is a multi-purpose arena in Amherst, New York. The arena is home to the State University of New York at Buffalo men's and women's basketball teams, the women's volleyball team, and wrestling team. The facility has a capacity of 6,783 people for basketball games.

== Description ==
"The Recreation and Athletics Complex (RAC) on the University's North Campus includes Broadview Arena, a $12.5 million Phase II Building and a $1.5 million outdoor playing fields complex."

"Broadview Arena's main gymnasium is home to the Bulls men's and women's basketball teams, wrestling team and the women's volleyball team." "The largest "free-floating" hardwood floor in the United States at the time it was built, it features basketball, volleyball and badminton courts circled by a 200-meter track and a capacity of 6,783 spectators following renovations during the summer of 2004."

The arena used to seat more than 8,000 people, but a renovation project funded by the Blue & White club reduced the seating to 6,783 by eliminating bleachers and adding chairbacks. The student section was relocated with the renovations. Before the renovations, the students used to generally sit behind the scorer's table, from baseline to baseline, except immediately behind the players' benches. Syracuse's Carrier Dome is the only on-campus college basketball facility in the state that is larger. The volleyball court was constructed for the World University Games in 1993.

"The building includes three levels of offices, locker rooms, equipment and training-therapy rooms, seminar rooms, and racquetball courts." "The Phase II Building on the north side of Broadview Arena has an Olympic-sized swimming pool and a separate diving well, a triple gymnasium, and dance studio." "Other areas are a wrestling practice room, two weight-training rooms (a fitness center and a varsity weight room), additional racquetball and squash courts, an erg room, and an aerobics room."

Behind Broadview Arena, a playing fields complex provides lighted outdoor space for several sports, including soccer, field hockey, softball, tennis, basketball, handball and archery.

In 2011, the lighting and sound systems in the arena were upgraded to state-of-the-art quality. A new video and scoring system was also installed.

On February 3, 2012, the Harlem Globetrotters played on the Bulls court. On August 22, 2013, President Barack Obama spoke to a sold-out crowd at Alumni Arena about the rising costs of college tuition.

On March 11, 2026, Broadview Federal Credit Union bought the naming rights and the arena was renamed to Broadview Arena.

== See also ==
- University at Buffalo Stadium
- Amherst Audubon Field

== Gallery ==
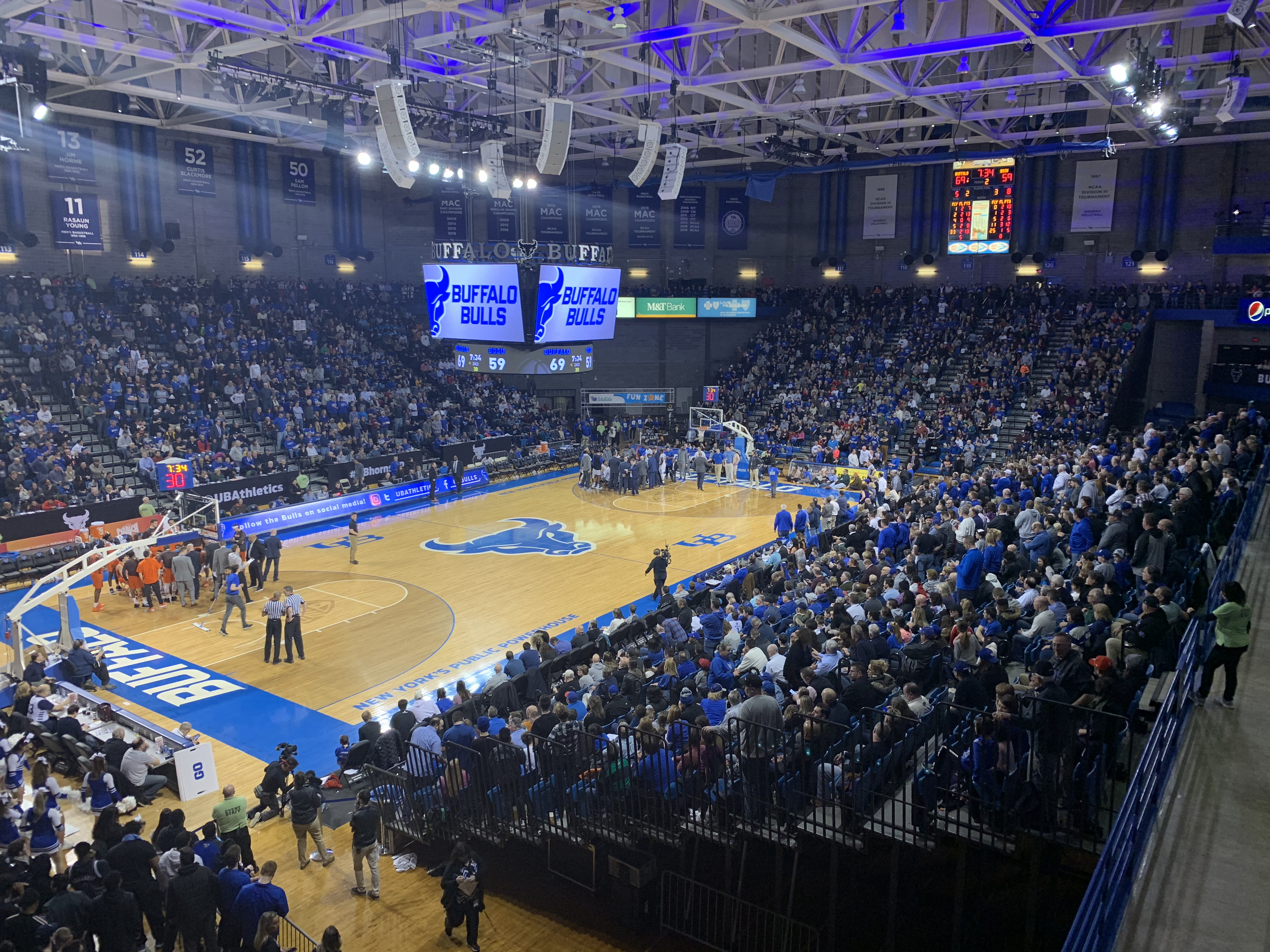
Last regular season home game for the Men's Basketball team of the 2019 season, beating Bowling Green State University

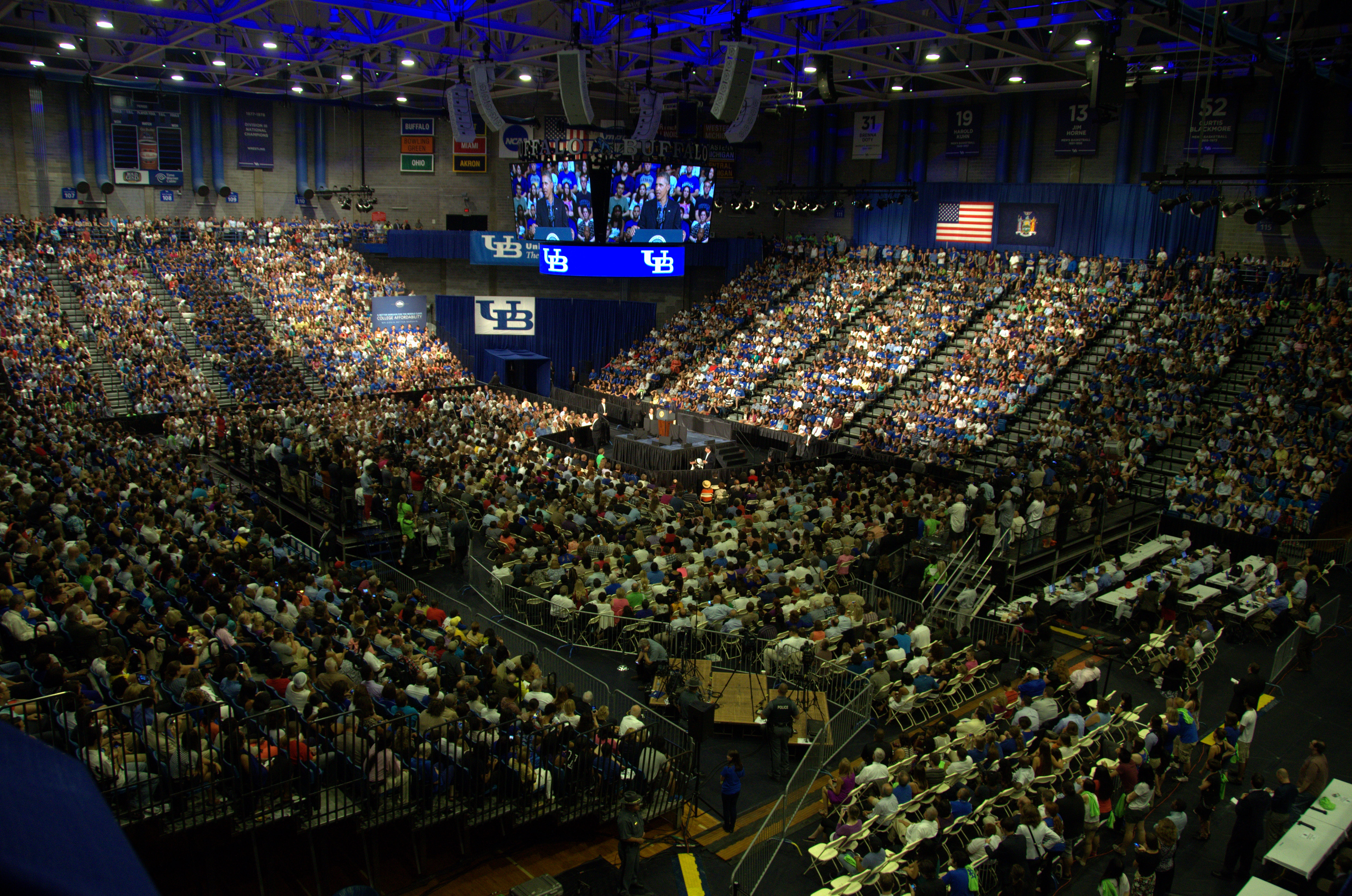
A crowd gathered for a speech by President Barack Obama in 2013

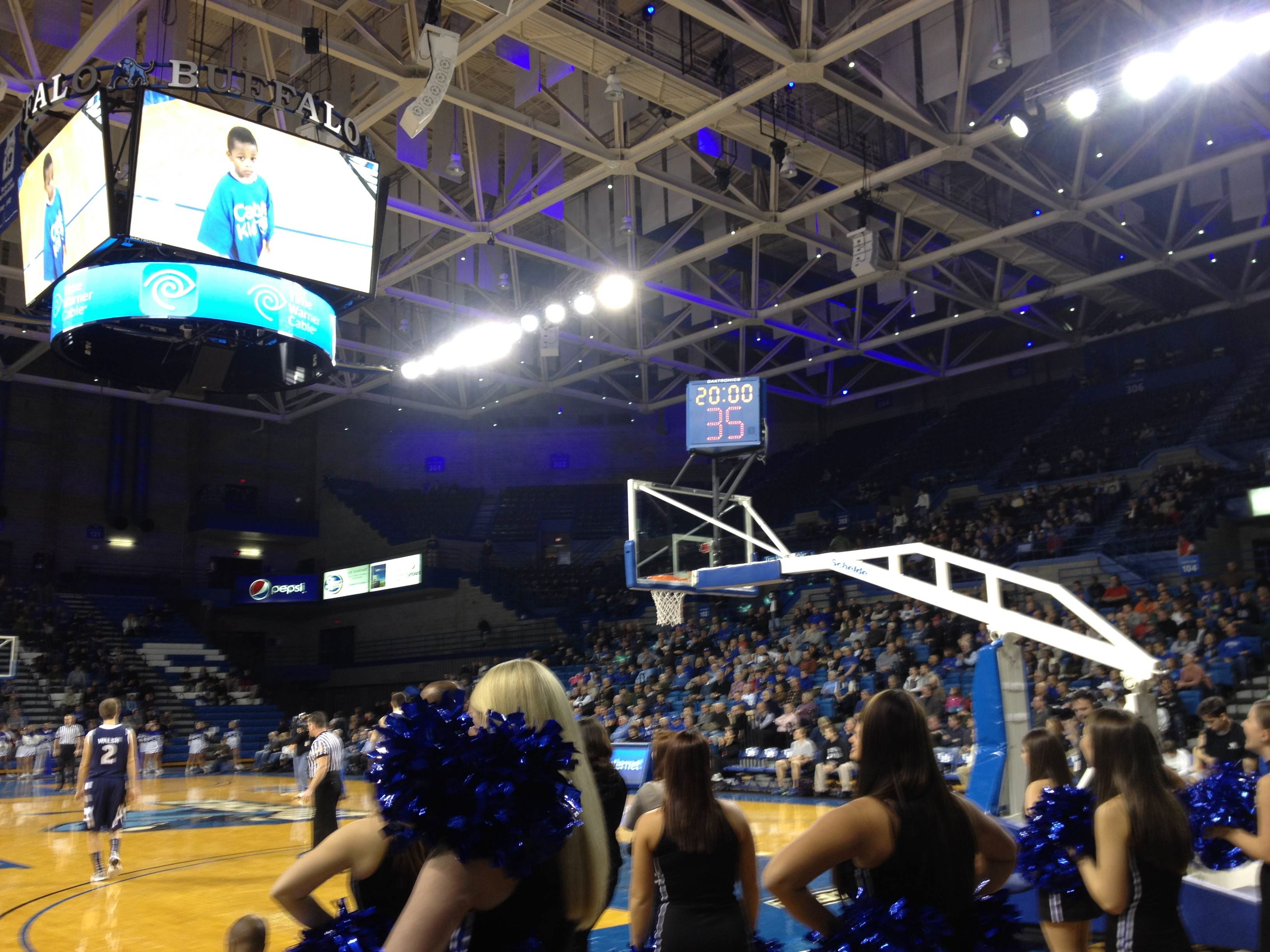
Alumni Arena with scoreboard improvements in 2012

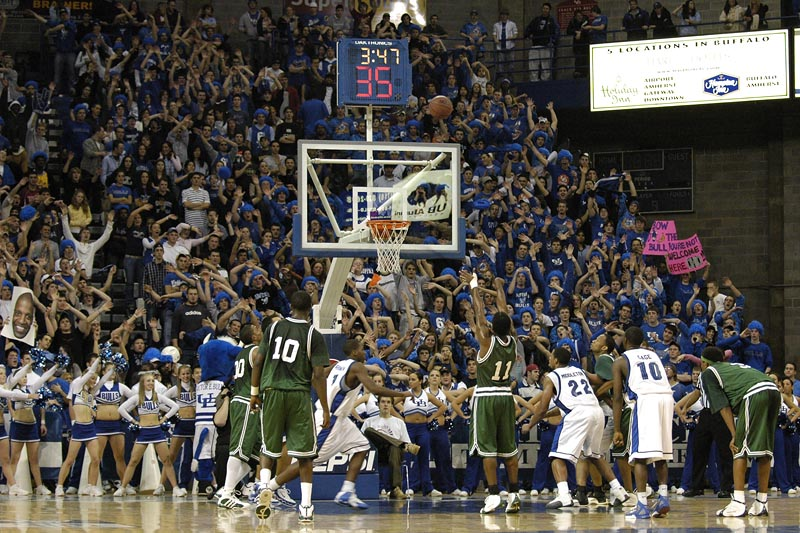
Alumni Arena student section at a Buffalo Bulls basketball game in 2006

== See also ==
- List of NCAA Division I basketball arenas
