= Buffalo Bulls baseball =

Athletic Team

Buffalo Bulls
- Founded: 1894
- Defunct: 2017; 9 years ago
- University: University at Buffalo
- Conference: Mid–American; East Division
- Location: Amherst, New York
- Home stadium: Amherst Audubon Field (2001–2017); Dunn Tire Park (2000)
- Nickname: Bulls
- Colors: Royal blue and white

NCAA tournament appearances
- 1971, 1973

Conference regular season champions
- 1980

The Buffalo Bulls baseball team was a varsity intercollegiate athletic team of the University at Buffalo in Amherst, New York, United States. From 2001 to 2017, the team was a member of the Mid-American Conference East division, which is part of the National Collegiate Athletic Association (NCAA) at the Division I level. The Bulls played their home games at Amherst Audubon Field on the UB campus. The Bulls were coached by Ron Torgalski for the program's final 11 seasons, from 2007 through 2017. At the conclusion of the 2017 season, the program was eliminated by the university.

== History ==
The year 1949 is considered the official inaugural season of UB varsity baseball. But baseball’s start at UB goes back much further. There are newspaper accounts of a UB team from as early as 1894. From 1914–1917, several good UB teams took to the diamond playing some of the best teams in the country including Pitt, Army, Michigan State and Syracuse. The Bulls qualified for the NCAA Division I baseball tournament in 1971 and 1973.

== Year-by-year results ==
Record table
Season	Coach	Overall	Conference	Standing	Postseason
Records unavailable (1914–1917)
No program (1917–1948)
Records unavailable (1949–1987)
No program (1988–1999)
Independent (2000)
2000	Bill Breene	12–35			
Mid-American Conference (2001–2017)
2001	Bill Breene	11–39	5–23	7th (East)	
2002	Bill Breene	16–28	6–17	6th (East)	
2003	Bill Breene	16–37	5–21	6th (East)	
2004	Bill Breene	15–39	4–18	6th (East)	
2005	Bill Breene	19–30–1	5–14–1	6th (East)	
2006	Bill Breene	15–37	6–21	6th (East)	
2007	Ron Torgalski	16–35	11–16	3rd (East)	
2008	Ron Torgalski	14–38	7–19	6th (East)	
2009	Ron Torgalski	20–35	6–20	6th (East)	
2010	Ron Torgalski	23–29	9–18	5th (East)	
2011	Ron Torgalski	14–38	3–22	6th (East)	
2012	Ron Torgalski	20–36	10–16	4th (East)	MAC Tournament
2013	Ron Torgalski	33–24	19–7	2nd (East)	MAC Tournament
2014	Ron Torgalski	26–26	13–13	4th (East)	MAC Tournament
2015	Ron Torgalski	16–35	7–20	6th (East)	
2016	Ron Torgalski	21–31	8–16	T–3rd (East)	
2017	Ron Torgalski	17–34	8–16	T–4th (East)	
MAC:		312–571–1	132–297–1		
Total:		324–606–1			
National champion Postseason invitational champion Conference regular season champion Conference regular season and conference tournament champion Division regular season champion Division regular season and conference tournament champion Conference tournament champion

== Bulls in Major League Baseball ==
The first Buffalo alumnus to appear in Major League Baseball (MLB) was Bill Schuster, who debuted with the Pittsburgh Pirates in 1937. The most notable Buffalo alumnus from the pre-draft era was Eddie Basinski, who picked up 147 hits in 203 games with the Pirates and Brooklyn Dodgers between 1944 and 1947. However, both players attended Buffalo before the school sponsored a baseball program.

Since the Major League Baseball draft began in 1965, Buffalo has had 33 players selected.

Bulls in the Major League Baseball Draft
Year	Player	Round	Team
1967	Timothy Uraskevich	59	Mets
1968	Brian Hansen	7	Phillies
1968	Kenneth Rutkowski	4	Giants
1968	Timothy Uraskevich	8	Mets
1969	Kenneth Rutkowski	2	Red Sox
1970	Rich May	38	Orioles
1970	Paul Lang	25	Brewers
1970	Gary Gaiser	6	Pirates
1973	Joseph Piscotty	25	Pirates
1976	James Riedel	38	Dodgers
1976	Bob Amico	22	Dodgers
1976	John Kidd	19	Red Sox
1976	John Buszka	14	Indians
1979	Edwin Retzer	28	Athletics
1979	James Wojcik	19	Giants
1980	Pasquale Raimondo	18	Dodgers
1980	Dennis Howard	5	Blue Jays
1980	Joe Hesketh	2	Expos
1981	Dave Rosenhahn	6	Cubs
1982	Gene Dudek	27	Orioles
1983	Paul Daddario	29	Braves
1983	Pete Grimm	3	Reds
1985	Bob Strickland	18	Cubs
1986	Robert Williams	7	Orioles
2005	Joseph Mihalics	34	Mets
2007	Mike Folli	42	Cardinals
2009	Zach Anderson	29	Blue Jays
2012	Tom Murphy	3	Rockies
2013	Jason Kanzler	20	Twins
2014	Mike Burke	30	Orioles
2014	Tyler Mautner	14	Twins
2015	Nick Sinay	22	Blue Jays
2016	Mike Kaelin	15	Angels

Joe Hesketh, a 1980 draftee of the Montreal Expos, played in MLB as a left-handed pitcher from 1984 to 1994. Pitcher Steve Geltz played for the Bulls and was undrafted in 2008. He made his Major League debut in 2012 for the Los Angeles Angels.
