= 2027 Florida Gators baseball team =

Season of University of Florida baseball team

2027 Florida Gators baseball
- Conference: Southeastern Conference
- Record: 0–0 (0–0 SEC)
- Head coach: Kevin O'Sullivan (20th season)
- Assistant coaches: Chuck Jeroloman; Taylor Black; David Kopp
- Home stadium: Condron Ballpark

2027 Southeastern Conference baseball standings
	Conf.				Overall
Team	W		L	PCT	W		L	PCT
Georgia ‍‍‍	0	–	0	–	0	–	0	–
Texas ‍‍‍	0	–	0	–	0	–	0	–
Texas A&M ‍‍‍	0	–	0	–	0	–	0	–
Alabama ‍‍‍	0	–	0	–	0	–	0	–
Florida ‍‍‍	0	–	0	–	0	–	0	–
Auburn ‍‍‍	0	–	0	–	0	–	0	–
Arkansas ‍‍‍	0	–	0	–	0	–	0	–
Mississippi State ‍‍‍	0	–	0	–	0	–	0	–
Ole Miss ‍‍‍	0	–	0	–	0	–	0	–
Tennessee ‍‍‍	0	–	0	–	0	–	0	–
Oklahoma ‍‍‍	0	–	0	–	0	–	0	–
Vanderbilt ‍‍‍	0	–	0	–	0	–	0	–
Kentucky ‍‍‍	0	–	0	–	0	–	0	–
LSU ‍‍‍	0	–	0	–	0	–	0	–
South Carolina ‍‍‍	0	–	0	–	0	–	0	–
Missouri ‍‍‍	0	–	0	–	0	–	0	–
† – Conference champion ‡ – Tournament champion y – Invited to the NCAA Tournament; As of June 22, 2026; Rankings from D1Baseball

The 2027 Florida Gators baseball team will represent the University of Florida in the sport of college baseball during the 2027 NCAA Division I baseball season. Florida competes in the Southeastern Conference (SEC) and play their home games at Condron Ballpark on the university's Gainesville, Florida campus. The team will be coached by Kevin O'Sullivan in his twentieth season Florida's head coach.

== Previous season ==
The Gators finished the 2026 season with a record of 18–12 in conference play and 41–21 overall record for 5th place in the SEC. As the 5th seed in the SEC Tournament, they would beat 12th seed Vanderbilt 8-3 in the Second round, 4th seed Alabama 13-3 in the Quarterfinals, but would lose to 1st seed Georgia 8-7 in the Semifinals. They got an at-large bid to the Troy Super Regional in the NCAA Tournament as the 1st seed in the regional, where they would beat 4th seed Rider 8-7 in the First round, 2nd seed Miami (FL) 22-10, in the Second round, but would lose both games to 3rd seed Troy 16-11 in Game 1 and 10-2 in Game 2 ending their season record at 41–21.

== Preseason ==
=== Preseason SEC awards and honors ===
Preseason All-SEC First Team
Player	No.	Position	Class

Preseason All-SEC Second Team
Player	No.	Position	Class

=== Coaches poll ===
SEC Coaches' Poll
Predicted finish	Team	Points
1		
2		
3		
4		
5		
6		
7		
8		
9		
10		
11		
12		
13		
14		
15		
16		

== Roster ==
2027 Florida Gators roster
Pitchers	Catchers Infielders	Outfielders	Two way players

=== Coaches ===
2027 Florida Gators baseball coaching staff
- Kevin O'Sullivan – head coach – 20th season
- Chuck Jeroloman – associate head coach – 8th season
- Taylor Black – assistant coach – 5th season
- David Kopp – pitching coach – 6th season

Note: Season counter accounts for all stints at Florida.

== Personnel ==
=== Starters ===
Opening night lineup
Pos.	No.	Player.	Year
--			
--			
--			
--			
--			
--			
--			
--			
--			

Weekend pitching rotation
Day	No.	Player.	Year
Friday			
Saturday			
Sunday			

== Schedule and results ==
2027 Florida Gators baseball game log
(Overall: 0–0; Conference: 0–0); (Home: 0–0; Away: 0–0; Neutral: 0–0)
Regular season (0–0)
October
Fall Exhibitions

Date	Time (EST)	Opponent	Rank	TV	Venue	Score	Win	Loss	Save	Attendance

February (0–0)
(Home; 0–0; Away: 0–0)

Date	Time (EST)	Opponent	Rank	TV	Venue	Score	Win	Loss	Save	Attendance	Overall record

March (0–0)
(Home; 0–0; Away: 0–0)

Date	Time (EST)	Opponent	Rank	TV	Venue	Score	Win	Loss	Save	Attendance	Overall record	SEC record

April (0–0)
(Home; 0–0; Away: 0–0)

Date	Time (EST)	Opponent	Rank	TV	Venue	Score	Win	Loss	Save	Attendance	Overall record	SEC record

May (0–0)
(Home; 0–0; Away: 0–0)

Date	Time (EST)	Opponent	Rank	TV	Venue	Score	Win	Loss	Save	Attendance	Overall record	SEC record

Postseason (0–0)
SEC Tournament (0–0)

Date	Time (EST)	Opponent	Rank	TV	Venue	Score	Win	Loss	Save	Attendance	Overall record	Tournament record

"#" represents ranking. All rankings from D1 Baseball Poll on the date of the contest.
"()" represents postseason seeding in the SEC Tournament or NCAA Regional, respectively.
= Win, = Loss, = Canceled/Postponed
Bold = **Florida Gators team member**
* = Non-Conference Game
Schedule Source:

Schedule Notes:

== Rankings ==
Ranking movements
	Week																	
Poll	Pre	1	2	3	4	5	6	7	8	9	10	11	12	13	14	15	16	Final
Coaches'		*																
Baseball America																		
NCBWA†																		

† NCBWA ranks 30 teams in their preseason poll, but only ranks 25 teams weekly during the season.
* A new poll was not released for this week, so for comparison purposes, the previous week's ranking is inserted in this week's slot.

== Postseason awards and honors ==
2026 SEC All-SEC First Team
Player	No.	Position	Class

SEC Pitcher of the Year
Player	No.	Position	Class
