= 2027 Texas Longhorns baseball team =

College Baseball Season

2027 Texas Longhorns baseball
- Conference: Southeastern Conference
- Record: 0–0 (0–0 SEC)
- Head coach: Jim Schlossnagle (3rd season)
- Associate head coach: Nolan Cain (3rd season)
- Assistant coaches: Troy Tulowitzki (6th season); Max Weiner (3rd season)
- Home stadium: UFCU Disch–Falk Field

2027 Southeastern Conference baseball standings
	Conf.				Overall
Team	W		L	PCT	W		L	PCT
Georgia ‍‍‍	0	–	0	–	0	–	0	–
Texas ‍‍‍	0	–	0	–	0	–	0	–
Texas A&M ‍‍‍	0	–	0	–	0	–	0	–
Alabama ‍‍‍	0	–	0	–	0	–	0	–
Florida ‍‍‍	0	–	0	–	0	–	0	–
Auburn ‍‍‍	0	–	0	–	0	–	0	–
Arkansas ‍‍‍	0	–	0	–	0	–	0	–
Mississippi State ‍‍‍	0	–	0	–	0	–	0	–
Ole Miss ‍‍‍	0	–	0	–	0	–	0	–
Tennessee ‍‍‍	0	–	0	–	0	–	0	–
Oklahoma ‍‍‍	0	–	0	–	0	–	0	–
Vanderbilt ‍‍‍	0	–	0	–	0	–	0	–
Kentucky ‍‍‍	0	–	0	–	0	–	0	–
LSU ‍‍‍	0	–	0	–	0	–	0	–
South Carolina ‍‍‍	0	–	0	–	0	–	0	–
Missouri ‍‍‍	0	–	0	–	0	–	0	–
† – Conference champion ‡ – Tournament champion y – Invited to the NCAA Tournament; As of June 22, 2026; Rankings from D1Baseball

The 2027 Texas Longhorns baseball team represent the University of Texas at Austin during the 2027 NCAA Division I baseball season. The Longhorns play their home games at UFCU Disch–Falk Field as a member of the Southeastern Conference (SEC) and will be led by third-year head coach Jim Schlossnagle.

== Previous season ==
The Longhorns ended the 2026 season with a record of 19–10 in conference play and a 46–15 overall record, good for 2nd place in the SEC. They would play in the SEC Tournament as the #2 seed, where they would lose to 12th seed Arkansas 8–1 in the Quarterfinals. They would receive an at-large bid to the NCAA Tournament as a 1 seed in the Austin Regional, where they would beat 4th seed Holy Cross 19–1, 3rd seed Tarleton State 16–2, and 2nd seed UC Santa Barbara 6–4 in the Regional Finals to reach their own Austin Super Regional, where they would beat 11th seed Oregon 11–3 in Game 1 and 6–5 in Game 2, where they would play in the Men's College World Series for the 39th time in program history. They would lose to 3rd seed Georgia 7–1; they would then beat 7th seed Alabama 14–2, but would lose their rematch to Georgia 2–0, ending their season at a 46–15 overall record.

== Personnel ==
=== Roster ===
2027 Texas Longhorns roster
Pitchers	Catchers Infielders	Outfielders Legend: (S) Suspended; (I) Ineligible; Injured; Redshirt

Roster Notes

=== Starters ===
Lineup
Pos.	No.	Player.	Year
C			
1B			
2B			
3B			
SS			
LF			
CF			
RF			
DH			

=== Coaches ===
2027 Texas Longhorns coaching staff
- Jim Schlossnagle – Head coach – 3rd year
- Nolan Cain – Associate Head coach/Recruiting Coordinator – 3rd year
- Troy Tulowitzki – Assistant coach/Hitting – 6th year
- Max Weiner – Assistant coach/Pitching – 3rd year

=== Support staff ===
2027 Texas Longhorns support staff
- Drew Bishop – Director of operations – 16th year
- Chuck Box – Director of program development – 3rd year
- Gehrig Mosiello – Director of player development – 3rd year
- Matt Couch – Assistant head coach for athletic performance – 8th year
- Sam Garcia – Assistant athletic trainer – 3rd year

== Offseason ==
=== Departures ===
Offseason departures
Name	Number	Pos.	Height	Weight	Year	Hometown	Notes

==== 2026 MLB Draft ====
Round	Pick	Overall pick	Player	Position	MLB team

=== Transfer Portal ===
==== Outgoing transfers ====
Outgoing transfers
Name	No.	Pos.	Height	Weight	Hometown	Year	New school

==== Incoming transfers ====
Incoming transfers
Name	B/T	Pos.	Height	Weight	Hometown	Year	Previous school

=== Recruiting class ===
2026 Texas Recruits
Name	B/T	Pos.	Height	Weight	Hometown	High School

=== Coaching staff ===
==== Coaching staff departures ====
Name	Position	New Team	New Position	Source

==== Coaching staff additions ====
Name	Position	Previous Team	Previous Position

Coaching Staff Notes

== Preseason ==
=== SEC coaches poll ===
SEC coaches poll
Predicted finish	Team	Votes (1st place)
1		
2		
3		
4		
5		
6		
7		
8		
9		
10		
11		
12		
13		
14		
15		
16		

=== Awards and honors ===
==== Preseason SEC awards and honors ====
Preseason All-SEC Team
Player	No.	Position	Class	Designation

==== Preseason All-Americans ====
Preseason All-Americans
Player	Position	Selector	Designation

== Schedule and results ==
2027 Texas Longhorns baseball game log
(Overall: 0–0; Conference: 0–0); (Home: 0–0; Away: 0–0; Neutral: 0–0)
Regular season (0–0)
February (0–0)
(Home; 0–0; Away: 0–0)

Date	Time (CST)	Opponent	Rank	TV	Venue	Score	Win	Loss	Save	Attendance	Overall record	SEC record

March (0–0)
(Home; 0–0; Away: 0–0)

Date	Time (CST)	Opponent	Rank	TV	Venue	Score	Win	Loss	Save	Attendance	Overall record	SEC record

April (0–0)
(Home; 0–0; Away: 0–0)

Date	Time (CST)	Opponent	Rank	TV	Venue	Score	Win	Loss	Save	Attendance	Overall record	SEC record

May (0–0)
(Home; 0–0; Away: 0–0)

Date	Time (CST)	Opponent	Rank	TV	Venue	Score	Win	Loss	Save	Attendance	Overall record	SEC record

Postseason (0–0)
SEC Tournament (0–0)

Date	Time (CST)	Opponent	Rank	TV	Venue	Score	Win	Loss	Save	Attendance	Overall record	Tournament record

"#" represents ranking. All rankings from D1 Baseball Poll on the date of the contest.
"()" represents postseason seeding in the SEC Tournament or NCAA Regional, respectively.
= Win, = Loss, = Canceled/Postponed
Bold = **Texas Longhorns team member**
* = Non-Conference Game
Schedule Source:

Schedule Notes:

== Rankings ==
Ranking movements
	Week																	
Poll	Pre	1	2	3	4	5	6	7	8	9	10	11	12	13	14	15	16	Final
Coaches'		*																
Baseball America																		
NCBWA†																		

† NCBWA ranks 30 teams in their preseason poll, but only ranks 25 teams weekly during the season.
* A new poll was not released for this week, so for comparison purposes, the previous week's ranking is inserted in this week's slot.

== Awards and honors ==
=== National awards and honors ===
National Yearly honors
Honors	Player	Position	Date Awarded

=== SEC awards and honors ===
SEC Yearly honors
Honors	Player	Position	Date Awarded

SEC Weekly honors
Honors	Player	Position	Date Award

Award notes:
