= Scott Stricklin (baseball) =

American baseball coach (born 1972)

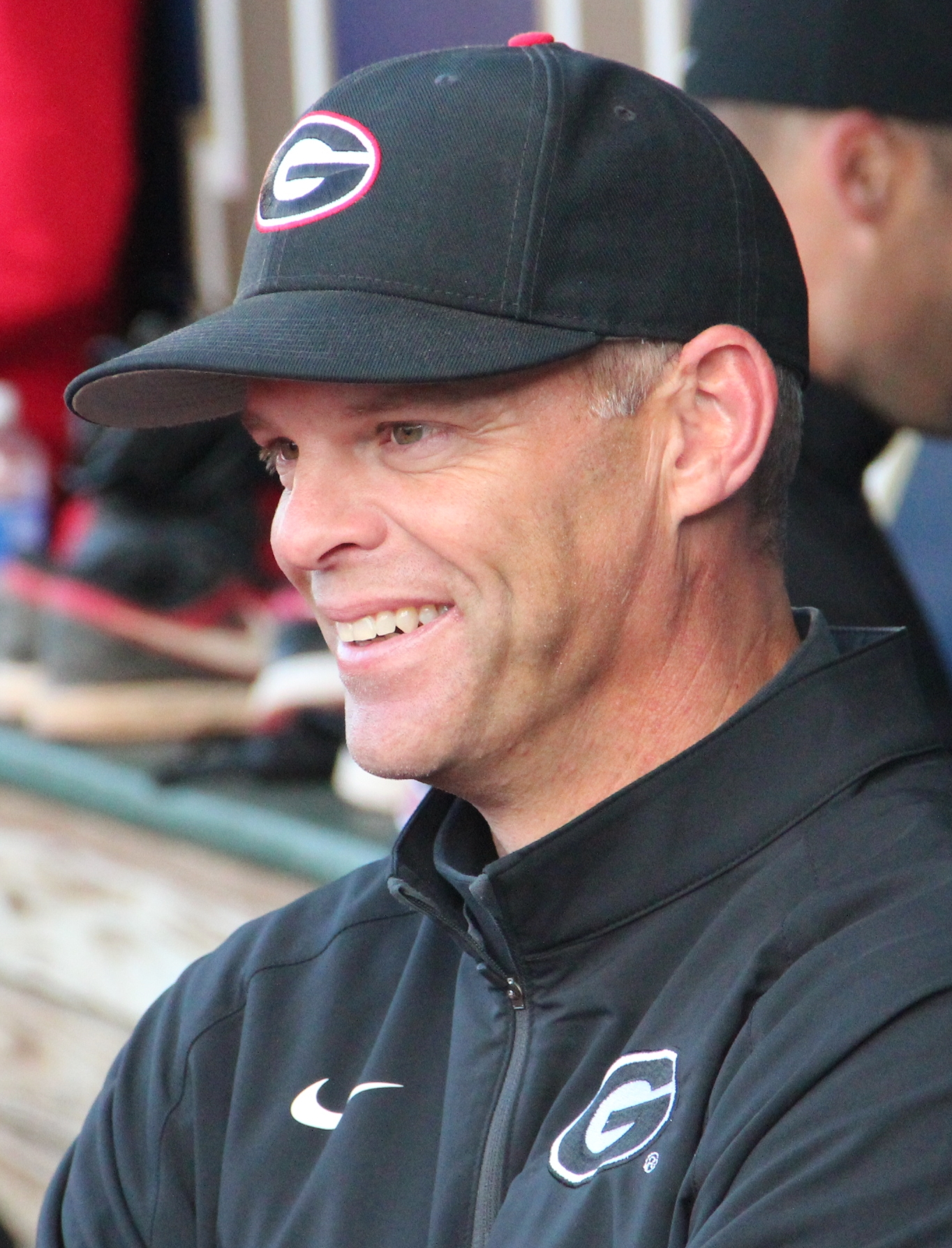
- Stricklin in 2014

Biographical details
- Born: February 17, 1972 (age 54); Athens, Ohio, U.S.
- Education: Kent State University

Playing career
- 1991–1993: Kent State Golden Flashes
- 1993: Elizabethton Twins
- 1993–1994: Fort Wayne Wizards
- 1994: Nashville Xpress
- 1994: Salt Lake Buzz
- 1995: Fort Myers Miracle
- 1996: Greenville Braves
- 1997: St. Petersburg Devil Rays
- Position: Catcher

Coaching career (HC unless noted)
- 1998–1999: Georgia Tech (vol. asst.)
- 2000–2001: Vanderbilt (asst.)
- 2002–2004: Georgia Tech (asst.)
- 2005–2013: Kent State
- 2014–2023: Georgia

Head coaching record
- Overall: 649–424–1 (.605)
- Tournaments: NCAA: 9–11

Accomplishments and honors

Championships
- 7× Mid-American Conference East Division championships (2006, 2007, 2008, 2010, 2011, 2012, 2013); 5× Mid-American Conference Regular season championships (2006, 2008, 2011, 2012, 2013); 5× Mid-American Conference Tournament championships (2007, 2009, 2010, 2011, 2012); 5× NCAA Regional appearances (2007, 2009, 2010, 2011, 2012); NCAA Super Regional appearance (2012); College World Series appearance (2012)

Awards
- CollegeBaseballInsider.com Co-National Coach of the Year Award (2012); 2× ABCA Mideast Region Coach of the Year Awards (2011, 2012); 3× Mid-American Conference Coach of the Year Awards (2006, 2011, 2012)

Scott Stricklin (born February 17, 1972) is an American college baseball coach. Stricklin was the head coach at Georgia from 2014–2023 and at Kent State from 2005–2013. Before serving as Kent State's head coach, Stricklin played for Kent State from 1991–1993 and played minor league baseball from 1993–1997. He began his coaching career as a volunteer assistant under former Kent State head coach Danny Hall at Georgia Tech from 1998–1999. In 2000–2001, he served as an assistant at Vanderbilt, and he returned to Georgia Tech as an assistant from 2002–2004.

== Coaching career ==
=== Kent State ===
As the head coach of Kent State, Scott Stricklin head coaching record was 350–188 (.651). Under him, Kent State won five Mid-American Conference Baseball Tournament championships, reaching the NCAA Regionals in each of those seasons. The team also reached one Super Regional, in 2012. After defeating Oregon in that Super Regional, the team advanced to the 2012 College World Series. Stricklin won three Mid-American Conference Coach of the Year Awards and one ABCA Mideast Region Coach of the Year Award.

Following Kent State's performance in the 2012 postseason, several news outlets, including the Detroit News, speculated that Michigan was interested in hiring Stricklin to replace former head coach Rich Maloney, whose contract was not extended at the end of the 2012 season. Stricklin later confirmed that Michigan had contacted him, but that he elected to stay at Kent State. Michigan instead hired then-Maryland head coach Erik Bakich.

=== Georgia ===
Following the 2013 season, Stricklin was hired to replace David Perno as the head coach of Georgia. He was fired following the 2023 season after compiling a record of 299–236–1 with three NCAA Division I Baseball Championship Regionals appearances.

== Head coaching record ==
Below is a table of Stricklin's yearly records as an NCAA head baseball coach.

Record table
Season	Team	Overall	Conference	Standing	Postseason
Kent State Golden Flashes (Mid-American Conference) (2005–2013)
2005	Kent State	33–20	9–10	4th (East)	
2006	Kent State	38–19	17–5	1st (East)	
2007	Kent State	33–26	19–8	1st (East)	NCAA Regional
2008	Kent State	36–21	16–8	1st (East)	
2009	Kent State	43–17	17–9	3rd (East)	NCAA Regional
2010	Kent State	39–25	28–9	1st (East)	NCAA Regional
2011	Kent State	45–17	21–5	1st (East)	NCAA Regional
2012	Kent State	47–20	24–3	1st (East)	College World Series
2013	Kent State	36–23	20–7	1st (East)	
Kent State:		350–188	171–64		
Georgia Bulldogs (Southeastern Conference) (2014–2023)
2014	Georgia	26–29–1	11–18–1	6th (East)	
2015	Georgia	26–28	10–19	7th (East)	
2016	Georgia	27–30	11–19	5th (East)	
2017	Georgia	25–32	11–19	6th (East)	
2018	Georgia	39–21	18–12	2nd (East)	NCAA Regional
2019	Georgia	46–17	21–9	2nd (East)	NCAA Regional
2020	Georgia	14–4	0–0		Season suspended due to COVID-19
2021	Georgia	31–25	13–17	5th (East)	
2022	Georgia	36–23	15–15	T–2nd (East)	NCAA Regional
2023	Georgia	29–27	11–19	6th (East)	
Georgia:		299–236–1	121–146–1		
Total:		649–424–1			
National champion Postseason invitational champion Conference regular season champion Conference regular season and conference tournament champion Division regular season champion Division regular season and conference tournament champion Conference tournament champion
