= 2013 Mid-American Conference baseball tournament =

American collegiate baseball tournament

- Teams: 8
- Format: Double-elimination
- Finals site: All Pro Freight Stadium; Avon, OH
- Champions: Bowling Green (3rd title)
- Winning coach: Danny Schmitz (3rd title)
- MVP: Nick Bruns (Bowling Green)

2013 Mid-American Conference baseball standings
	Conf.				Overall
Team	W		L	PCT	W		L	PCT
East Division
Kent State ^{x}‍‍‍	20	–	7	.741	36	–	23	.610
Buffalo ‍‍‍	19	–	7	.731	33	–	24	.579
Miami ‍‍‍	14	–	13	.519	26	–	30	.464
Bowling Green ‍‍‡‍^{y}	13	–	14	.481	24	–	31	.436
Akron ‍‍‍	10	–	16	.385	15	–	37	.288
Ohio ‍‍‍	9	–	18	.333	14	–	39	.264
West Division
Northern Illinois ^{x}‍‍‍	16	–	11	.593	22	–	34	.393
Ball State ‍‍‍	15	–	12	.556	31	–	24	.564
Toledo ‍‍‍	13	–	14	.481	25	–	33	.431
Eastern Michigan ‍‍‍	12	–	15	.444	26	–	28	.481
Central Michigan ‍‍‍	12	–	15	.444	25	–	32	.439
Western Michigan ‍‍‍	8	–	19	.296	16	–	38	.296
x – Division champion ‡ – Tournament champion y – Invited to the NCAA tournament As of June 4, 2013; Rankings from Collegiate Baseball

The 2013 Mid-American Conference baseball tournament was held from May 22 through 25. The top eight regular season finishers of the league's twelve teams, regardless of division, met in the double-elimination tournament held at All Pro Freight Stadium in Avon, Ohio. Sixth seed Bowling Green won their third tournament championship to earn the conference's automatic bid to the 2013 NCAA Division I baseball tournament.

== Seeding and format ==
The top eight finishers based on conference winning percentage, regardless of division, were seeded one through eight. Teams then played a two bracket, double-elimination tournament leading to a single elimination final.

Team	W	L	Pct.	GB	Seed
East Division
Kent State	20	7	.741	–	1
Buffalo	19	7	.731	.5	2
Miami	14	13	.519	6	5
Bowling Green	13	14	.481	7	6
Akron	10	16	.385	9.5	–
Ohio	9	18	.333	11	–
West Division
Northern Illinois	16	11	.593	–	3
Ball State	15	12	.556	1	4
Toledo	13	14	.481	3	7
Central Michigan	12	15	.444	4	8
Eastern Michigan	12	15	.444	4	–
Western Michigan	8	19	.296	8	–

== Results ==
First round
1	Kent State	15
8	Central Michigan	8
4	Ball State	13
5	Miami	7
8	Central Michigan	5
5	Miami	6
2	Buffalo	10
7	Toledo	12
3	Northern Illinois	4
6	Bowling Green	6
2	Buffalo	13
3	Northern Illinois	0

Second round
1	Kent State	1
4	Ball State	3
1	Kent State	7
5	Miami	0
7	Toledo	3
6	Bowling Green	4
7	Toledo	4
2	Buffalo	1

Semifinals
1	Kent State	1
4	Ball State	4
7	Toledo	5	0
6	Bowling Green	2	1

Final
4	Ball State	0
6	Bowling Green	7

== All-Tournament Team ==
The following players were named to the All-Tournament Team.

Name	School
Jeremy Shay	Bowling Green
Ethan McKinney	Bowling Green
Mike Frank	Bowling Green
Nick Bruns	Bowling Green
T. J. Weir	Ball State
Scott Baker	Ball State
Sam Tidaback	Ball State
Jason Kanzler	Buffalo
Derek Toadvine	Kent State
Tyler Grogg	Toledo

=== Most Valuable Player ===
Nick Bruns was named Tournament Most Valuable Player. Bruns was a pitcher for Bowling Green, who recorded two wins and a save in the tournament.
