= Ron Torgalski =

Biographical details
- Education: Hamilton, Canisius

Playing career

Basketball
- 1985–1989: Hamilton
- 1989–1991: Monstreas Club

Baseball
- 1986–1987: Hamilton

Coaching career (HC unless noted)

Basketball
- 1991–1994: Hamilton (assistant)
- 1995–2000: Buffalo (assistant)

Baseball
- 2001–2006: Buffalo (assistant)
- 2007–2017: Buffalo

Head coaching record
- Overall: 220–361

Accomplishments and honors

Awards
- MAC Coach of the Year (2013)

Ronald J. Torgalski is an American former college baseball and college basketball coach. He was most recently the head baseball coach for the University at Buffalo. During his nine seasons as coach of the Bulls, he compiled an overall record of 220–361.

== High school ==
For much of Torgalski's childhood, his father, Bob, was a coach and athletic director at Saint Francis High School in Athol Springs, New York. Between several different sports and schools, Bob's high school coaching career lasted for over 50 years. Torgalski played baseball, basketball and football at Nichols School in Buffalo. As a baseball player, he was variously named to the All-Catholic team, the All Niagara Frontier League team and Honorable Mention All-WNY. In his single season as a sophomore football player, he was named Honorable Mention All-Catholic.

In 1985, Torgalski and teammate Christian Laettner led Nichols to a New York state basketball title in Class C. Torgalski was named Most Valuable Player of the state tournament and Class C All-State. Torgalski graduated as the leading scorer in Nichols history (with 1,783 points) and was later inducted into the school's athletics hall of fame. In 1985 he was named to the All-WNY team by The Buffalo News alongside Clifford Robinson. In 1985, he represented Western New York in basketball at the Empire State Games.

== College ==
Torgalski went on to play both baseball and basketball in NCAA Division III at Hamilton College in Clinton, New York. He majored in psychology and was a member of Delta Upsilon. As a basketball player, Torgalski scored more than 1,000 points and finished his career with the third-most assists of any Division III player in history at that point. He also helped Hamilton to championships in the ECAC Men's Basketball Tournaments in 1986 and 1987. In 1989, he averaged 10.6 assists per game and was named to the All-ECAC first team.

In 1987, he represented Central New York in basketball at the Empire State Games.

After college, Torgalski played professional basketball in Sweden for two seasons with the Monstreas Club, averaging 22 points and 9 assists per game.

== Coaching career ==
=== Basketball ===
In 1991, Torgalski returned to Hamilton College as an assistant basketball coach. He served on the coaching staff for four seasons and helped Hamilton to a number one national ranking in the final polls in the 1990–91 season and a championship in the 1992 ECAC Men's Basketball Tournament. After the 1993–94 season, Torgalski left Hamilton to join Tim Cohane's staff as an assistant at the Division I level with the University at Buffalo. Torgalski remained on the staff for six seasons.

=== Baseball ===
In 2000, Buffalo resurrected its baseball program in Division I with Bill Breene as head coach. That year, Torgalski left the basketball program and joined the staff as an assistant baseball coach. In 2003, while an assistant coach, he received a Master of Science degree in education from Canisius College. After six years as an assistant coach, Torgalski was named the head coach in 2006. In 2013, he was named the Mid-American Conference Coach of the Year. Torgalski was the head coach of the baseball team until 2017 when the university chose to discontinue the program. Although Buffalo's was the lowest-funded baseball program in its conference at the time of its shuttering, Torgalski and his staff had several players selected in the Major League Baseball draft during his tenure as head coach.

== Personal life ==
Torgalski's brother, Randie, similarly coached two sports at the NCAA level. He served simultaneously as the head softball and men's basketball coach at Elmira College. Another brother, Rick, played baseball at Duke for four years and served as team captain.

== Head coaching record ==
Record table
Season	Team	Overall	Conference	Standing	Postseason
Buffalo Bulls (Mid-American Conference) (2007–2017)
2007	Buffalo	16–35	11–16	3rd (East)	
2008	Buffalo	14–38	7–19	6th (East)	
2009	Buffalo	20–35	6–20	6th (East)	
2010	Buffalo	23–29	9–18	5th (East)	
2011	Buffalo	14–38	3–22	6th (East)	
2012	Buffalo	20–36	10–16	4th (East)	MAC Tournament
2013	Buffalo	33–24	19–7	2nd (East)	MAC Tournament
2014	Buffalo	26–26	13–13	4th (East)	MAC Tournament
2015	Buffalo	16–35	7–20	6th (East)	
2016	Buffalo	21–31	8–16	T–3rd (East)	
2017	Buffalo	17–34	8–16	T–4th (East)	
Buffalo:		220–361	101–183		
Total:		220–361			
National champion Postseason invitational champion Conference regular season champion Conference regular season and conference tournament champion Division regular season champion Division regular season and conference tournament champion Conference tournament champion
