= Jason Kanzler =

American baseball coach (born 1990)

Seattle Mariners – No. 18
- Manager
- Born: August 20, 1990 (age 36); Bronxville, New York, U.S.

Teams
- As manager: Seattle Mariners (2027–present); As coach: Houston Astros (2022–2023)

Career highlights and awards
- World Series champion (2022)

Jason Robert Kanzler (born August 20, 1990) is an American baseball manager for the Seattle Mariners of Major League Baseball. He previously was a coach for the Houston Astros, winning the 2022 World Series, then was the farm system director for the Chicago Cubs. He played in the minor leagues in the Minnesota Twins system for three seasons.

== Playing career ==
Kanzler played high school baseball at Penfield High School in Penfield, New York. In 2008, he was named third-team all-state by the New York State Sportswriters Association.

Kanzler enrolled at Northeastern University and attempted to make the Northeastern Huskies baseball team as a walk-on but was cut. He transferred to the University at Buffalo and played for the Buffalo Bulls. He was named the Mid-American Conference Baseball Player of the Year in 2013.

The Minnesota Twins selected Kanzler in the 20th round of the 2013 MLB draft, and he signed with the team. He reached High-A in 2014 and 2015 but was released in December 2015.

== Coaching career ==
After his playing career ended, Kanzler became a chemistry and physics teacher at Katy High School in Katy, Texas, while also coaching their baseball team. Kanzler joined the Houston Astros organization as a minor league hitting coach in 2019 and joined the major league coaching staff before the 2022 season. The Astros won the 2022 World Series. He was named the assistant hitting coach for the 2023 season. The Chicago Cubs hired him as their farm system director in January 2024.

On November 3, 2026, the Seattle Mariners hired Kanzler as their manager.

== Managerial record ==
Team	Year	Regular season					Postseason			
Team	Year	Games	Won	Lost	Win %	Finish	Won	Lost	Win %	Result
SEA	2027	0	0	0	–	–	–	–	–	
Total		0	0	0	–		0	0	–	
