= Bethesda Big Train =

Collegiate baseball team in Maryland, United States

- Logo

Information
- League: Cal Ripken Sr. Collegiate Baseball League (2005–present); Clark Griffith Collegiate Baseball League (1999–2004)
- Location: Bethesda, Maryland
- Ballpark: Shirley Povich Field
- Founded: 1999
- Regular Season Titles championships: 2004 (CGL); 2005, 2006, 2009, 2011, 2013, 2014, 2015, 2017, 2018, 2019, 2021, 2022 (co-champions), 2025 (CRSCBL)
- League championships: 2004 (CGL); 2005 (co-champions), 2009, 2010, 2011, 2016, 2017, 2018 (co-champions), 2019, 2021, 2023, 2024, 2025 (CRSCBL)
- 2025 record: 31–9
- Colors: Green, white, black
- Mascot: Homer, Bunt
- Ownership: Bethesda Community Base Ball Club
- Manager: Sal Colangelo
- Website: bigtrain.org

The Bethesda Big Train is a collegiate summer baseball team based in Bethesda, Maryland. The team is a member of the Cal Ripken Sr. Collegiate Baseball League (CRSCBL), and derives its name from the nickname of Hall of Fame pitcher Walter Johnson, who was a Bethesda resident for ten years. The Big Train plays its home games at Shirley Povich Field. As of June 2025, 227 Big Train alumni have played professional baseball, including 25 in the major leagues.

== History ==
The Bethesda Community Base Ball Club, Inc. was founded in 1998 "to raise funds to improve the quality of youth baseball and softball fields in Montgomery County and the District of Columbia." Proceeds from the operations of the Bethesda Big Train are used to further this mission.

The Big Train began playing in 1999 as part of the Clark Griffith Collegiate Baseball League (CGL). In 2004, they won the CGL championship.

=== 2000s ===
In 2005, the Big Train helped establish the Cal Ripken Sr. Collegiate Baseball League (CRSCBL). That first year, the team won the regular season championship and shared the league championship with the Silver Spring-Takoma Thunderbolts. In 2006, the Big Train were the regular season champions.

In 2006, Washington Post columnist Marc Fisher called Big Train games at Shirley Povich Field "the ultimate small-town fantasy."

In 2009, the Big Train won both the regular season and league championships.

=== 2010s ===
In 2010, the Big Train captured their 2nd straight league championship after placing 3rd in the regular season, and in 2011 rolled to their 3rd consecutive league championship with a 36–9 overall record and were ranked the #1 summer collegiate baseball league team in the nation by Perfect Game USA.

In early 2012, the Bethesda Community Base Ball Club announced that Big Train operations would come under the control of one of its longtime partners, BCC Baseball. In 2020, BCC Baseball decided to focus its business efforts on other aspects and the Bethesda Community Base Ball Club was reconstituted with a community-based Board of Directors to re-establish the management of Big Train operations. The goal remained to support community-based activities in Montgomery County, Maryland and, to the extent that funds could be generated in excess of operating costs, to provide financial support for fixing up ballfields in Montgomery County

In 2016, after a four-year title drought, Big Train captured the Cal Ripken League championship with a victory over the Baltimore Redbirds. The next year, Big Train again defeated the Redbirds in the finals to win back-to-back league championships. That season, Big Train outfielder James Outman was named the 2017 National Summer Collegiate Player of the Year by Perfect Game after hitting .341 with 18 stolen bases and a league-best nine homers and 36 RBIs.

The Big Train and Redbirds were named co-champions in 2018 after bad weather canceled the championship game.

Big Train won their fourth straight league title in 2019 after defeating the Silver Spring-Takoma Thunderbolts in a three-game League Championship Series.

=== 2020s ===
Bethesda's 2020 season was cancelled due to the COVID-19 pandemic.

In 2021, the Big Train won their fourth straight regular season title, seven games ahead of the number two seed Alexandria Aces. In the playoffs, the Big Train swept the D.C. Grays in two games of the Semifinal Series, and then won their fifth straight league title by sweeping the Alexandria Aces in two games during the League Championship Series.

In 2022, the Big Train tied the Alexandria Aces for first place in the regular season. In the playoffs, the Big Train swept the Gaithersburg Giants in two games of the Semifinal Series, however the Aces then swept the Big Train in the League Championship Series for the Aces' first ever Ripken League Championship title. This was the first time the Big Train lost the League Championship Series since 2015.

In 2023, the Cal Ripken League conducted competition in two divisions. The Big Train won the North Division and the Alexandria Aces won the South Division. The Big Train took two of three from Cropdusters Baseball in the semi-final series, before sweeping the top-seeded Aces in the League Championship Series to take their tenth Ripken League Championship title.

2024 was another successful year for the Big Train, as the team won nine of eleven games to close the season. The Big Train followed this with an undefeated postseason, ultimately sweeping the Southern Maryland Senators to win their eleventh Ripken League Championship Series. The Big Train outscored their opponents 58-14 in the postseason.

In addition to on-field efforts, Big Train runs a summer camp for children ages 5–12.

== Team records ==
=== Individual (single-season) ===
- Batting average: .462, Andrew Williamson (2024)
- Hits: 67, Adam Barry (2011)
- Doubles: 17, Brendan Hendriks (2012)
- Triples: 6, Ryan Collins (2010)
- Home runs: 16, Hunter Renfroe (2012)
- Total bases: 116, Hunter Renfroe (2012)
- Runs batted in: 53, Hunter Renfroe (2012)
- Runs scored: 47, Hunter Renfroe (2012)
- Stolen bases: 39, Gio Diaz (2019)
- Walks: 48, Kobe Kato (2019)
- Hit by pitch: 21, Jarrod Parks (2009)
- On-base percentage: .612, Kobe Kato (2019)
- Slugging percentage: .908, Andrew Williamson (2024)
- OPS: 1.452, Andrew Williamson (2024)
- On-base Streak: 33 games, Brennon Wright (2025)
- ERA: 0.00, Matt Hiserman (2008)
- Batting average against: 0.99, Nick Del Prado (2022)
- Innings pitched: 58.0, Dustin Pease (2005)
- Strikeouts: 69, Dirk Hayhurst (2001)
- Wins: 6, Scott Schneider (2008) and Cameron Love (2009)
- Saves: 10, Justin Davis (2000) and Matt Hiserman (2008)

== Notable alumni ==
The following former Big Train players have appeared in Major League Baseball. Players are grouped according to the collegiate league in which the Big Train competed during their tenure and are listed chronologically by their Big Train season.

=== Clark Griffith Collegiate Baseball League ===
| Player | Big Train season(s) | MLB debut | MLB career note |
|---|---|---|---|
| Charlton Jimerson | 1999 | 2005 | Outfielder and pinch runner who appeared in four MLB seasons with the Houston Astros and Seattle Mariners, hitting two home runs in nine career at-bats. |
| John Maine | 2000 | 2004 | Starting pitcher who appeared in eight MLB seasons for the Baltimore Orioles, New York Mets, and Miami Marlins, compiling a 41–36 record with 499 strikeouts in 593 innings. |
| Steve Schmoll | 2000 | 2005 | Relief pitcher who made 48 appearances for the Los Angeles Dodgers during the 2005 season, recording a 2–2 record and three saves. |
| Bobby Livingston | 2001 | 2006 | Left-handed pitcher who appeared in 13 games, including ten starts, across two MLB seasons with the Seattle Mariners and Cincinnati Reds. |
| Dirk Hayhurst | 2001 | 2008 | Pitched in 25 games across two MLB seasons with the San Diego Padres and Toronto Blue Jays. |
| Mike Costanzo | 2003 | 2012 | Corner infielder who appeared in 17 games for the Cincinnati Reds during the 2012 season. |
| Michael McKenry | 2004 | 2010 | Catcher who appeared in 311 games across seven MLB seasons with the Colorado Rockies, Pittsburgh Pirates, and St. Louis Cardinals, hitting 29 career home runs. |

=== Cal Ripken Sr. Collegiate Baseball League ===
| Player | Big Train season(s) | MLB debut | MLB career note |
|---|---|---|---|
| Brian Dozier | 2006 | 2012 | Played nine MLB seasons for the Minnesota Twins, Los Angeles Dodgers, Washington Nationals, and New York Mets; 2015 American League All-Star, 2017 Gold Glove Award winner, and member of Washington's 2019 World Series championship team. |
| Cody Allen | 2008, 2010 | 2012 | Pitched eight MLB seasons for Cleveland and the Los Angeles Angels, recording 153 career saves, including 149 with Cleveland. |
| Matt Bowman | 2010–12 | 2016 | Relief pitcher who has appeared for the St. Louis Cardinals, Cincinnati Reds, New York Yankees, Minnesota Twins, Arizona Diamondbacks, and Baltimore Orioles. |
| Joe Mantiply | 2010 | 2016 | Left-handed relief pitcher who has appeared for the Detroit Tigers, New York Yankees, and Arizona Diamondbacks; 2022 National League All-Star with Arizona. |
| Ryan Garton | 2011 | 2016 | Made 59 relief appearances across two MLB seasons with the Tampa Bay Rays and Seattle Mariners. |
| Hunter Renfroe | 2011–12 | 2016 | Outfielder selected 13th overall by the San Diego Padres in the 2013 Major League Baseball draft. Renfroe was the 2012 Ripken League MVP after setting Big Train single-season records with 16 home runs and 53 RBI, and the club retired his No. 11 that year. |
| Ty France | 2013 | 2019 | Infielder who began his career with the San Diego Padres and later played for the Seattle Mariners, Cincinnati Reds, Minnesota Twins, and Toronto Blue Jays; 2022 American League All-Star with Seattle. |
| Brandon Lowe | 2014 | 2018 | Second baseman and outfielder who spent his first eight MLB seasons with the Tampa Bay Rays before joining the Pittsburgh Pirates; American League All-Star with Tampa Bay in 2019 and 2025. |
| J. P. France | 2014 | 2023 | Made 31 appearances, including 30 starts, across his first two MLB seasons with the Houston Astros. |
| David McKay | 2015 | 2019 | Right-handed relief pitcher who appeared in MLB for the Seattle Mariners, Detroit Tigers, New York Yankees, Tampa Bay Rays, and Oakland Athletics. |
| Logan Gilbert | 2016 | 2021 | Starting pitcher selected 14th overall by the Seattle Mariners in the 2018 Major League Baseball draft; 2024 American League All-Star with Seattle. |
| Logan Driscoll | 2017 | 2024 | Catcher who made his MLB debut with the Tampa Bay Rays on September 3, 2024. |
| James Outman | 2017 | 2022 | Outfielder who made his MLB debut with the Los Angeles Dodgers and later played for the Minnesota Twins. |
| Ken Waldichuk | 2017 | 2022 | Made 42 appearances, including 35 starts, for the Oakland Athletics during the 2022 and 2023 seasons. |
| Hunter Brown | 2018 | 2022 | Starting pitcher for the Houston Astros and a member of the club's 2022 World Series championship team. |
| Alec Burleson | 2018 | 2022 | First baseman and outfielder who began his MLB career with the St. Louis Cardinals. |
| Chase Lee | 2019 | 2025 | Right-handed relief pitcher who debuted with the Detroit Tigers in 2025 and later appeared for the Toronto Blue Jays. |
| Nolan Schanuel | 2021 | 2023 | Selected 11th overall by the Los Angeles Angels in the 2023 Major League Baseball draft, tied with 2023 Big Train alumnus Chris Hacopian for the highest draft selection of a Big Train player, and reached MLB during his first professional season. |
