= Silver Spring–Takoma Thunderbolts =

Collegiate baseball team in Silver Spring, Maryland, United States

- Logo

Information
- League: Cal Ripken Collegiate Baseball League (2005–present); Clark Griffith Collegiate Baseball League (2000–2004)
- Location: Silver Spring, Maryland
- Ballpark: Montgomery Blair Baseball Stadium
- Founded: 2000
- Nickname: T-Bolts
- League championships: 2005 (co-champions), 2006
- 2026 season: 11–26
- Colors: Blue and Maroon
- Management: Edward Sharp (president); Kevin Schweickhardt (vice president)
- Manager: Brock Hunter
- Website: tbolts.org

The Silver Spring–Takoma Thunderbolts is a collegiate summer baseball team based in Silver Spring, Maryland. Most of its players are drawn from the college ranks. The team is a member of the Cal Ripken Collegiate Baseball League (CRCBL). The Thunderbolts play their home games at Montgomery Blair Baseball Stadium. The Thunderbolts are funded through ticket sales, sponsorship, merchandise sales, donations, and other fundraising efforts at games.

== History ==
In January 2000, Richard S. O’Connor purchased the charter rights to a collegiate summer baseball team in the Clark Griffith Collegiate Baseball League. The prior team was named the Southern Maryland Battlecats and played their home games in Charles County, Maryland.

Maryland Community Baseball, Inc., the parent corporation of the Thunderbolts was formed as a 501(c)(3) nonprofit organization to promote youth baseball in the Silver Spring-Takoma area.

The team began play in June 2000 at three locations in Silver Spring. In 2002, Maryland Community Baseball Inc. signed a 20-year license agreement with the Maryland-National Capital Park and Planning Commission to play all home games at Blair Stadium.

From 2000 to 2004, the Thunderbolts were members of the Clark Griffith Collegiate League. In 2005, the Thunderbolts became a charter member of the Cal Ripken Collegiate Baseball League. The Thunderbolts were the league's co-champions in 2005 and champions in 2006. They have also won the Montgomery Cup, boasting the best record of any Ripken League team in Montgomery County, twice since 2005.

The Thunderbolts returned to the League Championship Series in 2019, after sweeping the D.C. Grays in the semifinal round. They then took a 1–0 lead in the best-of-three LCS against the Bethesda Big Train, needing just one more win to clinch their first league title in 13 years, but dropped two straight to Bethesda, coming up short.

== Notable alumni ==
- Jonathan Papelbon, who was a closer for the Boston Red Sox, Philadelphia Phillies and Washington Nationals.
- Brett Cecil, in November, 2016 signed a 4-year, $30.5 million contract with the St. Louis Cardinals. For eight seasons he pitched for the Toronto Blue Jays. In 2013, he became the first Ripken League alum to play in an MLB All-Star Game.
- Mike Chernoff, General Manager of the Cleveland Guardians.
- Zach Clark, formerly a pitcher in the Baltimore Orioles organization.
- Matt Mervis, first baseman in the Chicago Cubs organization.
- Adam Mills, formerly a pitcher in the Boston Red Sox organization.
- Jake Taylor, with the San Rafael Pacifics in the Independent Pacific Association, was discussed in the book, The Only Rule Is It Has to Work, by Ben Lindbergh and Sam Miller.
