= Cade Doughty =

American baseball player (born 2001)

Atlanta Braves
- Second baseman
- Born: March 26, 2001 (age 25); Baton Rouge, Louisiana, U.S.
- Bats: Right Throws: Right
- Stats at Baseball Reference
Medals
Men's baseball
Representing United States
U-15 Baseball World Cup
Bronze medal – third place	2016 Iwaki	Team

Cade Joseph Doughty (born March 26, 2001) is an American professional baseball second baseman in the Atlanta Braves organization.

== Amateur career ==
Doughty grew up in Denham Springs, Louisiana, and attended Denham Springs High School. He was named the Louisiana Gatorade Player of the Year as a senior after hitting for a .505 average with 48 hits, six home runs, 10 doubles, four triples, 27 RBIs, 38 runs scored and 15 stolen bases. Doughty as selected in the 39th round of the 2019 MLB draft by the Detroit Tigers, but did not sign with the team. He played summer collegiate baseball after graduating high school for the Gaithersburg Giants of the Cal Ripken Collegiate Baseball League and was named a league All-Star.

Doughty batted .278 with two home runs, a double, 12 RBIs and four stolen bases through 15 games during his true freshman season before it was cut short due to the coronavirus pandemic. In the following summer he played for the Boca Raton Blazers of the South Florida Collegiate Baseball League, where he hit for a .429 average. As a redshirt freshman, Doughty batted .308. with 11 doubles, two triples, 13 home runs, and 55 RBIs. He played for the Winter Park Diamond Dawgs in the Florida Collegiate Summer League during the summer of 2021. Doughty was named to the watchlist for the Golden Spikes Award and a preseason All-American by Baseball America entering his redshirt sophomore season. He was named the Southeastern Conference (SEC) Player of the Week after going 8-for-14 at the plate with three doubles, two home runs, seven runs scored and 12 RBIs in the Tigers' opening series against Maine.

== Professional career ==
=== Toronto Blue Jays ===
The Toronto Blue Jays selected Doughty 78th overall in the 2022 Major League Baseball draft. He signed with the team on July 23, and received an $833,600 signing bonus. Doughty was assigned to the Dunedin Blue Jays of the Single-A Florida State League to begin his professional career.

Doughty played in a total of 26 games during the 2022 MiLB season batting .272 with 6 home runs, 5 doubles, 24 RBI, and 3 stolen bases.

Doughty made 36 appearances for the Double–A New Hampshire Fisher Cats in 2026, batting .250/.317/.366 with two home runs and 14 RBI; he also recorded time for the rookie–level Florida Complex League Blue Jays and Dunedin. Doughty was released by the Blue Jays organization on August 4, 2026.

=== Atlanta Braves ===
On August 10, 2026, Doughty signed a minor league contract with the Atlanta Braves.
