= Cal Ripken Sr. Collegiate Baseball League =

Washington, D.C. and Baltimore Baseball League

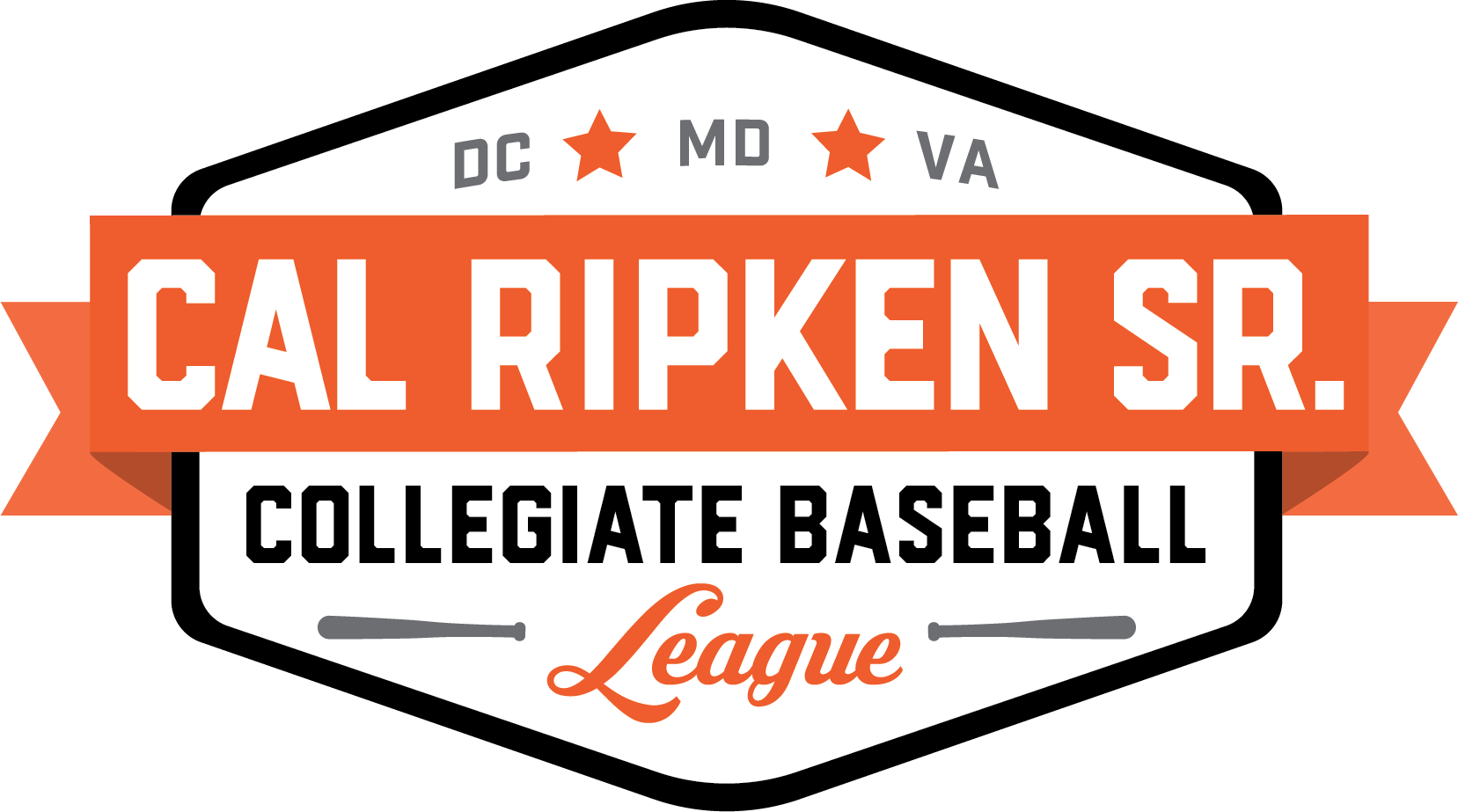
- Sport: Baseball
- Founded: 2005
- President: Bradley Rifkin
- Commissioner: Jason Woodward
- No. of teams: 8
- Country: USA
- Most recent champion: Olney Cropdusters
- Website: www.calripkenleague.org

The Cal Ripken Sr. Collegiate Baseball League (CRSCBL) is a collegiate summer baseball league located in the Washington, D.C. and Baltimore, Maryland metropolitan areas. The CRSCBL is a member of the National Alliance of College Summer Baseball (NACSB).

== History ==
Founded in 2005, the league was named for Cal Ripken Sr. (1935–1999), a longtime player and manager in the Baltimore Orioles system. It is not associated with the Cal Ripken Sr. Foundation.

The league's founding teams were the Bethesda Big Train, College Park Bombers, Maryland Redbirds, Rockville Express, Silver Spring-Takoma Thunderbolts, and Youse's Maryland Orioles.

The Herndon Braves joined in 2007 and the Alexandria Aces in 2008, expanding the league into Northern Virginia. Before the 2010 season, the College Park Bombers left the league and the Southern Maryland Nationals, formerly the Southern Maryland Cardinals, joined. The Maryland Redbirds changed their name to the Baltimore Redbirds.

Cal Ripken Sr. Collegiate Baseball League
Location of Cal Ripken Sr. Collegiate Baseball League home fields.
North Division
South Division

In 2011, the Vienna River Dogs became the ninth team in the league and the third in Northern Virginia. The same season, Perfect Game USA ranked the Bethesda Big Train the best team in summer baseball. The league expanded into Washington, D.C., when the D.C. Grays joined for the 2012 season. In 2013, the Baltimore Presstman Cardinals and the Gaithersburg Giants joined the League. In 2014, the Southern Maryland Nationals shut down and the Cardinals were replaced by the Baltimore Dodgers. Youse's Maryland Orioles left after the season. In 2015, the League changed to a two-division format with a playoff. After the 2018 season, the Baltimore Redbirds, Rockville Express, Baltimore Dodgers, and Loudoun Riverdogs left the League. The Olney Cropdusters joined the League in 2022 and the Southern Maryland Senators joined in 2023.

== Teams ==
Cal Ripken Sr. Collegiate Baseball League
Division	Team	Joined	City	Stadium
North	Bethesda Big Train	2005 (Note: The Big Train played in the Clark Griffith League from 1999-2004 before the CRSCBL was formed.)	Bethesda, Maryland	Shirley Povich Field
North	Olney Cropdusters	2022	Olney, Maryland	First Responder Field by ServPro at OBGC Park
North	Gaithersburg Giants	2013	Gaithersburg, Maryland	Criswell Automotive Field at Kelley Park
North	Silver Spring-Takoma Thunderbolts	2005 (Note: The Thunderbolts played in the Clark Griffith League from 2000-2004 before the CRSCBL was formed.)	Silver Spring, Maryland	Montgomery Blair Stadium
Division	Team	Joined	City	Stadium
South
South	Alexandria Aces	2008	Alexandria, Virginia	Frank Mann Field at Four Mile Run Park
South	D.C. Grays	2012	Washington, D.C.	Talbot Field, Catholic University (Note: The Grays played at the Nationals Baseball Academy for 11 years, followed by one year at Prince George's Community College (PGCC). The team was scheduled to play at Catholic University starting in 2025, but the work to install turf at Catholic was repeatedly delayed, prompting the team to spend the 2025 season at Woodbridge High School. The team began playing at Catholic University in 2026.)
South	Metro SoCo Braves	2007 (Note: The Braves were previously known as the Herndon Braves, the FCA Braves, and the South County Braves.)	Lorton, Virginia	South County High School
South	Southern Maryland Senators	2023	Waldorf, Maryland	North Point High School

== Champions ==
Numbers in parentheses denote the number of championships won by a team to that point, when more than one.

Season	League Champion	Regular season champion
2005	Bethesda Big Train, Silver Spring-Takoma Thunderbolts (co-champions)	Bethesda Big Train
2006	Silver Spring-Takoma Thunderbolts (2)	Bethesda Big Train
2007	Rockville Express	Youse's Maryland Orioles
2008	Youse's Maryland Orioles	Youse's Maryland Orioles
2009	Bethesda Big Train (2)	Bethesda Big Train
2010	Bethesda Big Train (3)	Youse's Maryland Orioles
2011	Bethesda Big Train (4)	Bethesda Big Train
2012	Baltimore Redbirds	Rockville Express
2013	Baltimore Redbirds (2)	Bethesda Big Train
2014	Baltimore Redbirds (3)	Bethesda Big Train
2015	Baltimore Redbirds (4)	Bethesda Big Train
2016	Bethesda Big Train (5)	Baltimore Redbirds
2017	Bethesda Big Train (6)	Bethesda Big Train
2018	Baltimore Redbirds (5), Bethesda Big Train (7) (co-champions)	Bethesda Big Train
2019	Bethesda Big Train (8)	Bethesda Big Train
2020	None (season cancelled due to COVID-19 pandemic)	
2021	Bethesda Big Train (9)	Bethesda Big Train
2022	Alexandria Aces	Alexandria Aces, Bethesda Big Train (tie)
2023	Bethesda Big Train (10)	Alexandria Aces
2024	Bethesda Big Train (11)	Alexandria Aces
2025	Bethesda Big Train (12)	Bethesda Big Train
2026	Olney Cropdusters	Olney Cropdusters

- "Previous Champions". Cal Ripken Collegiate Baseball League.

Every championship series from 2009 to 2018 pitted the Redbirds against the Big Train.

== Exhibition and representative games ==
=== Interleague showcase games ===
On July 15, 2009, teams of all-stars from the CRSCBL and the Valley Baseball League, a collegiate wooden-bat league based in Virginia, met to play a game dubbed the Mid-Atlantic Classic in Waldorf, Maryland. The Ripken League prevailed, 2–1. A planned 2010 rematch was rained out. On July 11, 2011, the leagues held the second Mid-Atlantic Classic at Eagle Field at Veterans Memorial Stadium in Harrisonburg, Virginia. The Ripken League won again, 6–3.

In 2017, 2018, and 2019, the CRSCBL sent all-star teams to North Carolina to participate in the Southern Collegiate Prospect Showcase against teams from the Florida Collegiate Summer League, the Southern Collegiate Baseball League, the Sunbelt Baseball League, and the Valley Baseball League.

=== International competition ===
==== Cuba goodwill tour ====
A team of Ripken League players traveled to Cuba after the 2016 season. The team played three of Cuba's top teams in the week before the start of the Cuban National Series in some of Cuba's classic ballparks. On August 3, the Ripken League team upset the 2015 champions of the Cuban major leagues. The Ripken League team defeated the Pinar del Rio Vegueros, 3-2, at Estadio Capitan San Luis before a boisterous crowd of 400. On August 4, the Ripken League team lost to the Matanzas Cocodrilos 6-2 at Estadio Victoria de Giron (Victory at the Bay of Pigs). On August 5, Industriales defeated the Ripken League team 6-4 in a rain-shortened game in Havana's iconic Estadio Latinoamericano where the March 2016 exhibition game between the Tampa Bay Rays and the Cuban National Team had been played. Brady Anderson and B.J. Surhoff, who played for the Baltimore Orioles in Cuba in 1999, coached the team along with Ripken League co-founder Dean Albany."

==== Games against Israel ====
As part of its exhibition series to prepare for the Olympics in Japan, the Israel National Baseball Team played three games against Ripken League competition in July 2021. On July 16, Israel defeated a Ripken League all-star team made up of players from the Braves, Giants, and Grays at FNB Field on City Island in Harrisburg, Pennsylvania. On July 18, Israel came from behind in the final inning to beat the Bethesda Big Train, 8-7, before a standing-room-only crowd of 835 at Shirley Povich Field in Rockville, Maryland. On July 19, a Ripken League all-star team of players from the Aces, Big Train, and Thunderbolts defeated Israel, 9-3, at Leidos Field at Ripken Stadium in Aberdeen, Maryland.

== MLB draft ==
Ripken League alumni have been selected throughout the Major League Baseball draft since the league's inaugural season in 2005. The league's draft history includes numerous early-round selections and several first-round picks, with many former players subsequently reaching the major leagues. The following is a year-by-year summary of the league's draft selections, highlighting players chosen in the early rounds and other alumni who went on to notable MLB careers.

In the 2005 MLB draft, six Ripken League players were selected. Steve Johnson (Youse's Orioles) was the first league player chosen, going to the Los Angeles Dodgers in the 13th round (406th overall). The other selections were Ian Marshall (College Park Bombers), Steven Braun (Rockville Express), Marcus Jones (Bethesda Big Train), Jeremy Farrell (Youse's Orioles), and Brian Bent (Youse's Orioles).

In the 2006 MLB draft, four former Ripken Leaguers were selected. Joe Smith (Rockville Express) was selected by the New York Mets in the third round (94th overall), and Steve Clevenger (Youse's Orioles) was selected by the Chicago Cubs in the seventh round. Seth Overbey (College Park Bombers) and Ron Lowe (Bethesda Big Train) were also selected.

In the 2007 MLB draft, 17 former or current Ripken Leaguers were selected. Brett Cecil (Silver Spring–Takoma Thunderbolts) was selected by the Toronto Blue Jays in the supplemental first round (38th overall), and Neil Ramirez (Youse's Orioles) was selected six picks later by the Texas Rangers. Adam Olbrychowski (Rockville Express) was selected by the New York Yankees in the fifth round. Later selections included Justin De Fratus (Rockville Express), Justin Grimm (Youse's Orioles), Mitch Harris (Youse's Orioles), and Connor Hoehn (Bethesda Big Train).

In the 2008 MLB draft, 37 former or current Ripken League players were selected. Carlos Gutiérrez (Bethesda Big Train) was selected by the Minnesota Twins in the first round (27th overall). Three other league players were selected in the first three rounds: Evan Frederickson (Bethesda Big Train), 35th overall by the Milwaukee Brewers; Derrik Gibson (Youse's Orioles), 77th overall by the Boston Red Sox; and L. J. Hoes (Youse's Orioles), 81st overall by the Baltimore Orioles. Michael Sheridan (Silver Spring–Takoma Thunderbolts) was selected by the Tampa Bay Rays in the fifth round. Later selections included Mitch Harris (Youse's Orioles), John Hicks (Youse's Orioles), and Oliver Drake (Youse's Orioles).

In the 2009 MLB draft, 38 former Ripken Leaguers were selected. Ben Tootle (Bethesda Big Train) was selected by the Minnesota Twins in the third round (101st overall), and Mycal Jones (Herndon Braves) was selected by the Atlanta Braves in the fourth round. Later selections included Brian Dozier (Bethesda Big Train), Ben Orloff (Rockville Express), Justin Bour (Youse's Orioles), and Connor Hoehn (Bethesda Big Train).

In the 2010 MLB draft, 31 former Ripken Leaguers were selected. Jarrett Parker (Herndon Braves) was selected by the San Francisco Giants in the second round (74th overall). Joe Leonard (Youse's Orioles) and Leon Landry (Youse's Orioles) were selected in the third round, Max Russell (Youse's Orioles) was selected in the fourth round, and Justin Grimm (Youse's Orioles) was selected in the fifth round. Later selections included Cody Allen (Bethesda Big Train), Keith Hessler (Herndon Braves), and Conor Mullee (Herndon Braves).

In the 2011 MLB draft, 33 former Ripken Leaguers were selected. Jed Bradley (Youse's Orioles) was selected by the Milwaukee Brewers in the first round (15th overall). John Hicks (Youse's Orioles) and Jake Lowery (Herndon Braves) were selected in the fourth round, while Beau Taylor (Herndon Braves) was selected in the fifth round. Later selections included Cody Allen (Bethesda Big Train), Chad Smith (Rockville Express), and Tucker Donahue (Bethesda Big Train).

In the 2012 MLB draft, 31 former Ripken Leaguers were selected. Kyle Zimmer (Alexandria Aces) was selected by the Kansas City Royals in the first round (fifth overall), the highest draft selection of a Ripken League alumnus in league history. Martin Agosta (Bethesda Big Train) was selected in the second round, Tim Cooney (Baltimore Redbirds) in the third round, and Josh Conway (Baltimore Redbirds) and Tucker Donahue (Bethesda Big Train) in the fourth round. Chris Taylor (Herndon Braves) and Joe Rogers (Youse's Orioles) were selected in the fifth round. Later selections included Matt Bowman (Bethesda Big Train), Joe Mantiply (Bethesda Big Train), and Ryan Garton (Baltimore Redbirds and Bethesda Big Train).

In the 2013 MLB draft, 22 former Ripken Leaguers were selected. Hunter Renfroe (Bethesda Big Train) was selected by the San Diego Padres in the first round (13th overall), and Ben Lively (Youse's Orioles) was selected by the Cincinnati Reds in the fourth round. Later selections included Chad Kuhl (Youse's Orioles), Jimmy Reed (Bethesda Big Train), and Joe Mantiply (Bethesda Big Train).

In the 2014 MLB draft, 27 former or current Ripken Leaguers were selected. Mark Zagunis (Baltimore Redbirds) was selected by the Chicago Cubs in the third round (78th overall), and Chris Ellis (Baltimore Redbirds) was selected ten picks later by the Los Angeles Angels. Later selections included Joe Harvey (Baltimore Redbirds), Gavin Sheets (Baltimore Redbirds), and Ryan Ripken (Youse's Orioles).

In the 2015 MLB draft, 32 former Ripken Leaguers were selected. Brandon Lowe (Bethesda Big Train) was selected by the Tampa Bay Rays in the third round (87th overall), and Alex Robinson (Baltimore Redbirds) was selected by the Minnesota Twins in the fifth round. Later selections included Bubba Derby (Bethesda Big Train), LaMonte Wade Jr. (Baltimore Redbirds), Brett Kennedy (Alexandria Aces), José Cuas (Gaithersburg Giants), Ty France (Bethesda Big Train), and Trevor Kelley (Baltimore Redbirds).

In the 2016 MLB draft, 31 former or current Ripken Leaguers were selected. Justin Dunn (Baltimore Redbirds) was selected by the New York Mets in the first round (19th overall). Buddy Reed (Baltimore Dodgers) and J. B. Woodman (Baltimore Redbirds) were selected in the second round, and Stephen Alemais (Bethesda Big Train) was selected in the third round. Later selections included Nathaniel Lowe (Vienna River Dogs), David McKay (Bethesda Big Train), and Matt Mervis (Silver Spring–Takoma Thunderbolts).

In the 2017 MLB draft, 42 former or current Ripken Leaguers were selected. Logan Warmoth (Baltimore Redbirds) was selected by the Toronto Blue Jays in the first round (22nd overall). Stuart Fairchild (Baltimore Redbirds) and Gavin Sheets (Baltimore Redbirds) were selected in the second round. Brett Netzer (Alexandria Aces) and Nick Raquet (Baltimore Redbirds) were selected in the third round, Drew Strotman (Bethesda Big Train) in the fourth round, and Andrew Bechtold (Bethesda Big Train), Bruce Zimmermann (Gaithersburg Giants), and Zach Kirtley (Bethesda Big Train) in the fifth round. Later selections included Isaac Mattson (Baltimore Redbirds) and Daniel Cabrera (Gaithersburg Giants).

In the 2018 MLB draft, 44 former Ripken Leaguers were selected. Logan Gilbert (Bethesda Big Train) was selected by the Seattle Mariners in the first round (14th overall). Nick Fortes (Baltimore Redbirds) was selected in the fourth round, and Nick Dunn (Silver Spring–Takoma Thunderbolts) was selected in the fifth round. Later selections included James Outman (Bethesda Big Train), J. P. France (Bethesda Big Train), Max Schuemann (Alexandria Aces), and Parker Caracci (Baltimore Redbirds).

In the 2019 MLB draft, 36 former Ripken Leaguers were selected, with the highest being Logan Driscoll in the second round (72nd overall) by the San Diego Padres.

In the 2020 MLB draft, six former Ripken Leaguers were selected. Jordan Westburg (Gaithersburg Giants) was selected by the Baltimore Orioles in the first round (30th overall). Daniel Cabrera (Gaithersburg Giants) was selected by the Detroit Tigers in the second round, and Alec Burleson (Bethesda Big Train) was selected by the St. Louis Cardinals later in the round. Anthony Servideo (Baltimore Redbirds) was selected in the third round, Carson Taylor (Bethesda Big Train) in the fourth round, and Hayden Cantrelle (Gaithersburg Giants) in the fifth round. Among the league alumni who signed as undrafted free agents were Matt Mervis (Silver Spring–Takoma Thunderbolts) and Zach Brzykcy (Baltimore Redbirds).

In the 2022 MLB draft, nine former Ripken Leaguers were selected. Blake Burkhalter (Alexandria Aces) was selected by the Atlanta Braves in Round 2C (76th overall), and Cade Doughty (Gaithersburg Giants) was selected two picks later by the Toronto Blue Jays. Cade Hunter (Bethesda Big Train) was selected by the Cincinnati Reds in the fifth round. Later selections included Tim Elko (Baltimore Redbirds), Magnus Ellerts (D.C. Grays), and Chris “Bubba” Alleyne (Alexandria Aces).

In the 2023 MLB draft, 13 former Ripken Leaguers were selected. Nolan Schanuel (Bethesda Big Train) was selected by the Los Angeles Angels in the first round (11th overall). Kemp Alderman (Bethesda Big Train) and Luke Keaschall (Gaithersburg Giants) were selected in the second round, and Grayson Hitt (Bethesda Big Train) was selected in the fourth round. Later selections included Scott Bandura (D.C. Grays), Jake Eddington (Bethesda Big Train), and Trennor O’Donnell (Alexandria Aces).

In the 2024 MLB draft, 18 former Ripken Leaguers were selected. Émilien Pitre (Bethesda Big Train) was selected by the Tampa Bay Rays in the second round (58th overall). Brandon Clarke (Bethesda Big Train) was selected by the Boston Red Sox in the fifth round. Later selections included Jacob Friend (Alexandria Aces), Grant Knipp (Bethesda Big Train), Colin Tuft (Bethesda Big Train), Jared Sprague-Lott (D.C. Grays), and Carter Cunningham (Bethesda Big Train).

In the 2025 MLB draft, 24 former Ripken Leaguers were selected. Michael Lombardi (Bethesda Big Train) was selected by the Kansas City Royals in the second round (61st overall). Dixon Williams (Bethesda Big Train) was selected by the Atlanta Braves in Round 4C. Cam Nelson (Olney Cropdusters), James Quinn-Irons (Alexandria Aces), Peyton Prescott (Bethesda Big Train), and Davion Hickson (Bethesda Big Train) were selected in the fifth round. Matthew Miura (Olney Cropdusters), Colton Book (Alexandria Aces), and Kade Woods (Bethesda Big Train) were among the other selections.

In the 2026 MLB draft, nine former Ripken Leaguers were selected, including four within the first 100 picks. Chris Hacopian (Bethesda Big Train) was selected by the Washington Nationals in the first round (11th overall), tying Nolan Schanuel for the second-highest draft selection in league history behind Kyle Zimmer. Andrew Williamson (Bethesda Big Train), the league's 2024 Most Outstanding Hitter, was selected by the St. Louis Cardinals in Competitive Balance Round B (68th overall), followed by Brett Renfrow (Bethesda Big Train), 74th overall by the Minnesota Twins, and Aiden Robbins (Gaithersburg Giants), 92nd overall by the New York Mets. Later selections included Kide Adetuyi (Bethesda Big Train) in the seventh round; Ariston Veasey (Bethesda Big Train) and Brayden Martin (Olney Cropdusters) in the 11th round; Griffin Stieg (Bethesda Big Train) in the 13th round; and Dean Toigo (Bethesda Big Train) in the 20th round.

== Notable alumni ==
The following players represented current or former league clubs and later played in Major League Baseball. Players are grouped by the final Ripken League team for which they played and are listed chronologically by their season with that team. Players whose tenure preceded their club's entry into the Ripken League are identified separately.

=== Alexandria Aces ===
Player	Ripken League season(s)	MLB debut	MLB career note
Kyle Zimmer	2010	2019	Pitched in 83 games across three MLB seasons, all with the Kansas City Royals.
Kevin Kelly	2017	2023	Began his MLB career as a relief pitcher with the Tampa Bay Rays.
Max Schuemann	2017	2024	Utility player who began his MLB career with the Oakland Athletics before being acquired by the New York Yankees in 2026.

=== Baltimore Dodgers ===
Player	Ripken League season(s)	MLB debut	MLB career note
Joey Ortiz	2017	2023	Debuted with the Baltimore Orioles before becoming a regular infielder for the Milwaukee Brewers.

=== Baltimore Redbirds ===
Player	Ripken League season(s)	MLB debut	MLB career note
LaMonte Wade Jr.	2012–13	2019	First baseman and outfielder who began his MLB career with the Minnesota Twins and later played for the San Francisco Giants, Los Angeles Angels, and Houston Astros.
Gavin Sheets	2014–15	2021	First baseman and outfielder who began his MLB career with the Chicago White Sox before joining the San Diego Padres.
Stuart Fairchild	2015	2021	Outfielder who has appeared for the Arizona Diamondbacks, Seattle Mariners, San Francisco Giants, Cincinnati Reds, Atlanta Braves, and Cleveland Guardians.
Isaac Mattson	2015	2021	Relief pitcher who has appeared in MLB for the Baltimore Orioles and Pittsburgh Pirates.
Nick Fortes	2016	2021	Catcher who began his MLB career with the Miami Marlins before joining the Tampa Bay Rays.
Nic Enright	2017	2025	Made his MLB debut as a relief pitcher for the Cleveland Guardians.
Zach Brzykcy	2018	2024	Signed with the Washington Nationals as an undrafted free agent and made his MLB debut with the club in 2024.

=== Bethesda Big Train ===
==== Pre-Ripken League Big Train alumni ====
The following players represented the Big Train before the club became a member of the Cal Ripken Sr. Collegiate Baseball League in 2005.

Player	Big Train season(s)	MLB debut	MLB career note
Charlton Jimerson	1999	2005	Outfielder and pinch runner who appeared in four MLB seasons with the Houston Astros and Seattle Mariners, hitting two home runs in nine career at-bats.
John Maine	2000	2004	Starting pitcher who appeared in eight MLB seasons for the Baltimore Orioles, New York Mets, and Miami Marlins, compiling a 41–36 record with 499 strikeouts in 593 innings.
Steve Schmoll	2000	2005	Relief pitcher who made 48 appearances for the Los Angeles Dodgers during the 2005 season, recording a 2–2 record and three saves.
Bobby Livingston	2001	2006	Left-handed pitcher who appeared in 13 games, including ten starts, across two MLB seasons with the Seattle Mariners and Cincinnati Reds.
Dirk Hayhurst	2001	2008	Pitched in 25 games across two MLB seasons with the San Diego Padres and Toronto Blue Jays.
Mike Costanzo	2003	2012	Corner infielder who appeared in 17 games for the Cincinnati Reds during the 2012 season.
Michael McKenry	2004	2010	Catcher who appeared in 311 games across seven MLB seasons with the Colorado Rockies, Pittsburgh Pirates, and St. Louis Cardinals, hitting 29 career home runs.

==== Ripken League alumni ====
Player	Ripken League season(s)	MLB debut	MLB career note
Brian Dozier	2006	2012	Played nine MLB seasons for the Minnesota Twins, Los Angeles Dodgers, Washington Nationals, and New York Mets; 2015 American League All-Star, 2017 Gold Glove Award winner, and member of Washington's 2019 World Series championship team.
Cody Allen	2008, 2010	2012	Pitched eight MLB seasons for Cleveland and the Los Angeles Angels, recording 153 career saves, including 149 with Cleveland.
Matt Bowman	2010–12	2016	Relief pitcher who appeared in 231 games for the St. Louis Cardinals, Cincinnati Reds, New York Yankees, Minnesota Twins, Arizona Diamondbacks, Seattle Mariners, and Baltimore Orioles.
Joe Mantiply	2010	2016	Left-handed relief pitcher who has appeared for the Detroit Tigers, New York Yankees, and Arizona Diamondbacks; 2022 National League All-Star with Arizona.
Ryan Garton	Baltimore Redbirds, 2009; Bethesda Big Train, 2011	2016	Made 59 relief appearances across two MLB seasons with the Tampa Bay Rays and Seattle Mariners.
Hunter Renfroe	2011–12	2016	Outfielder selected 13th overall by the San Diego Padres in the 2013 Major League Baseball draft. Renfroe was the 2012 Ripken League MVP after setting Big Train single-season records with 16 home runs and 53 RBI, and the club retired his No. 11 that year.
Ty France	2013	2019	Infielder who began his career with the San Diego Padres and later played for the Seattle Mariners, Cincinnati Reds, Minnesota Twins, and Toronto Blue Jays; 2022 American League All-Star with Seattle.
Brandon Lowe	2014	2018	Second baseman and outfielder who spent his first eight MLB seasons with the Tampa Bay Rays before joining the Pittsburgh Pirates; American League All-Star with Tampa Bay in 2019 and 2025.
J. P. France	2014	2023	Made 31 appearances, including 30 starts, across his first two MLB seasons with the Houston Astros.
David McKay	2015	2019	Right-handed relief pitcher who appeared in MLB for the Seattle Mariners, Detroit Tigers, New York Yankees, Tampa Bay Rays, and Oakland Athletics.
Logan Gilbert	2016	2021	Starting pitcher selected 14th overall by the Seattle Mariners in the 2018 Major League Baseball draft; 2024 American League All-Star with Seattle.
Logan Driscoll	2017	2024	Catcher who made his MLB debut with the Tampa Bay Rays on September 3, 2024.
James Outman	2017	2022	Outfielder who made his MLB debut with the Los Angeles Dodgers and later played for the Minnesota Twins.
Ken Waldichuk	2017	2022	Made 42 appearances, including 35 starts, for the Oakland Athletics during the 2022 and 2023 seasons.
Hunter Brown	2018	2022	Starting pitcher for the Houston Astros and a member of the club's 2022 World Series championship team.
Alec Burleson	2018	2022	First baseman and outfielder who began his MLB career with the St. Louis Cardinals.
Chase Lee	2019	2025	Right-handed relief pitcher who debuted with the Detroit Tigers in 2025 and later appeared for the Toronto Blue Jays.
Nolan Schanuel	2021	2023	Selected 11th overall by the Los Angeles Angels in the 2023 Major League Baseball draft, the highest selection of a Big Train alumnus, and reached MLB during his first professional season.

=== Gaithersburg Giants ===
Player	Ripken League season(s)	MLB debut	MLB career note
Jordan Westburg	2017	2023	Infielder for the Baltimore Orioles; 2024 American League All-Star with Baltimore.
Luke Keaschall	2021	2025	Made his MLB debut with the Minnesota Twins after being selected in the second round of the 2023 draft.

=== Herndon Braves ===
Player	Ripken League season(s)	MLB debut	MLB career note
Jarrett Parker	2007	2015	Outfielder who appeared in four MLB seasons with the San Francisco Giants and Los Angeles Angels.
Chris Taylor	2009	2014	Utility player who began his MLB career with the Seattle Mariners and later played for the Los Angeles Dodgers and Los Angeles Angels; 2021 National League All-Star, co-recipient of the 2017 NLCS Most Valuable Player Award, and two-time World Series champion with the Dodgers.

=== Rockville Express ===
Player	Ripken League season(s)	MLB debut	MLB career note
Joe Smith	2005	2007	Relief pitcher who appeared in 866 games across 16 MLB seasons for eight clubs.

=== Silver Spring–Takoma Thunderbolts ===
==== Pre-Ripken League Thunderbolts alumni ====
The following player represented the Thunderbolts before the club became a member of the Cal Ripken Sr. Collegiate Baseball League in 2005.

Player	Thunderbolts season(s)	MLB debut	MLB career note
Jonathan Papelbon	2000	2005	Relief pitcher who recorded 368 saves across 12 MLB seasons with the Boston Red Sox, Philadelphia Phillies, and Washington Nationals; six-time All-Star and member of Boston's 2007 World Series championship team.

==== Ripken League alumni ====
Player	Thunderbolts season(s)	MLB debut	MLB career note
Zach Clark	2003, 2005	2013	Made one MLB appearance for the Baltimore Orioles after spending nine seasons in the club's organization.
Brett Cecil	2004–05	2009	Pitched ten MLB seasons for the Toronto Blue Jays and St. Louis Cardinals; 2013 American League All-Star with Toronto.
Matt Mervis	2016	2023	First baseman and designated hitter who appeared in three MLB seasons with the Chicago Cubs and Miami Marlins.

=== Vienna River Dogs ===
Player	Ripken League season(s)	MLB debut	MLB career note
Nathaniel Lowe	2015	2019	First baseman who has played for the Tampa Bay Rays, Texas Rangers, and Washington Nationals; Silver Slugger Award and Gold Glove Award winner and 2023 World Series champion with Texas.
