= Rockville Express =

Collegiate baseball team in Rockville, Maryland, United States

Information
- League: Maryland Collegiate Baseball League
- Location: Rockville, Maryland
- Ballpark: Laytonia Sports Complex
- Colors: Orange and Royal Blue
- Management: Jim Kazunas (President/General Manager)
- Manager: Rick Price

The Rockville Express is a collegiate summer baseball team based in Rockville, Maryland. Most of its players are drawn from the college ranks. The team is a member of the Maryland Collegiate Baseball League (MCBL) and a former member of the Cal Ripken Collegiate Baseball League (CRCBL). The Express plays its home games at The Laytonia Sports Complex in Derwood, Maryland. The Express is operated by the non-profit Rockville Community Baseball, Inc.. As of the fall of 2018, the team left the Cal Ripken Collegiate League along with three other teams. (The Baltimore Redbirds, The Loudoun River Dogs and the Baltimore Dodgers). The Rockville Express joined the Maryland Collegiate Baseball League beginning with the 2019 season. It appears the three other teams that left the Cal Ripken League in the fall of 2018 have ceased collegiate operations. The Rockville Express has relocated its home field to the Laytonia Sports Complex, a brand new multi-million dollar facility located a few miles from its former home field at Montgomery College Rockville. The move coincided with its move to the Maryland Collegiate League. The Maryland Collegiate League is a ten-team league with teams located throughout Maryland from Baltimore to the Washington suburbs.

The Express won the CRCBL's tournament in 2007, the team's third year. They finished the season with a record of 27–15 and tied Youse's Maryland Orioles for the regular season championship. The Express won the 2012 regular season championship with a 30–11 Record.

== History ==
Rockville Community Baseball, Inc. was founded in 2005 as a founding member of the Cal Ripken Collegiate Baseball League. During its inaugural season, the Express finished with a record of 19 wins, 20 losses, and 1 tie. In 2006, the Express won their final five games to finish in second place with a record of 25 wins and 15 losses. As noted above, 2007 brought the team a tie for the regular season championship and its first post-season CRCBL championship. The Express were the regular-season champions again in 2012.

In 2007, the Express announced a capital improvement program to provide lights on Knights Field. The home stadium, located at Montgomery College Rockville, has undergone extensive renovations, including a state of the art lighting system and press box.

In 2019, the Express joined the Maryland Collegiate Baseball League and moved its home field to the Laytonia Sports Complex in Derwood, Maryland.

== Notable alumni ==
- Joe Smith
- Justin DeFratus
- Will Kengor
