= Matt Mervis =

American baseball player (born 1998)

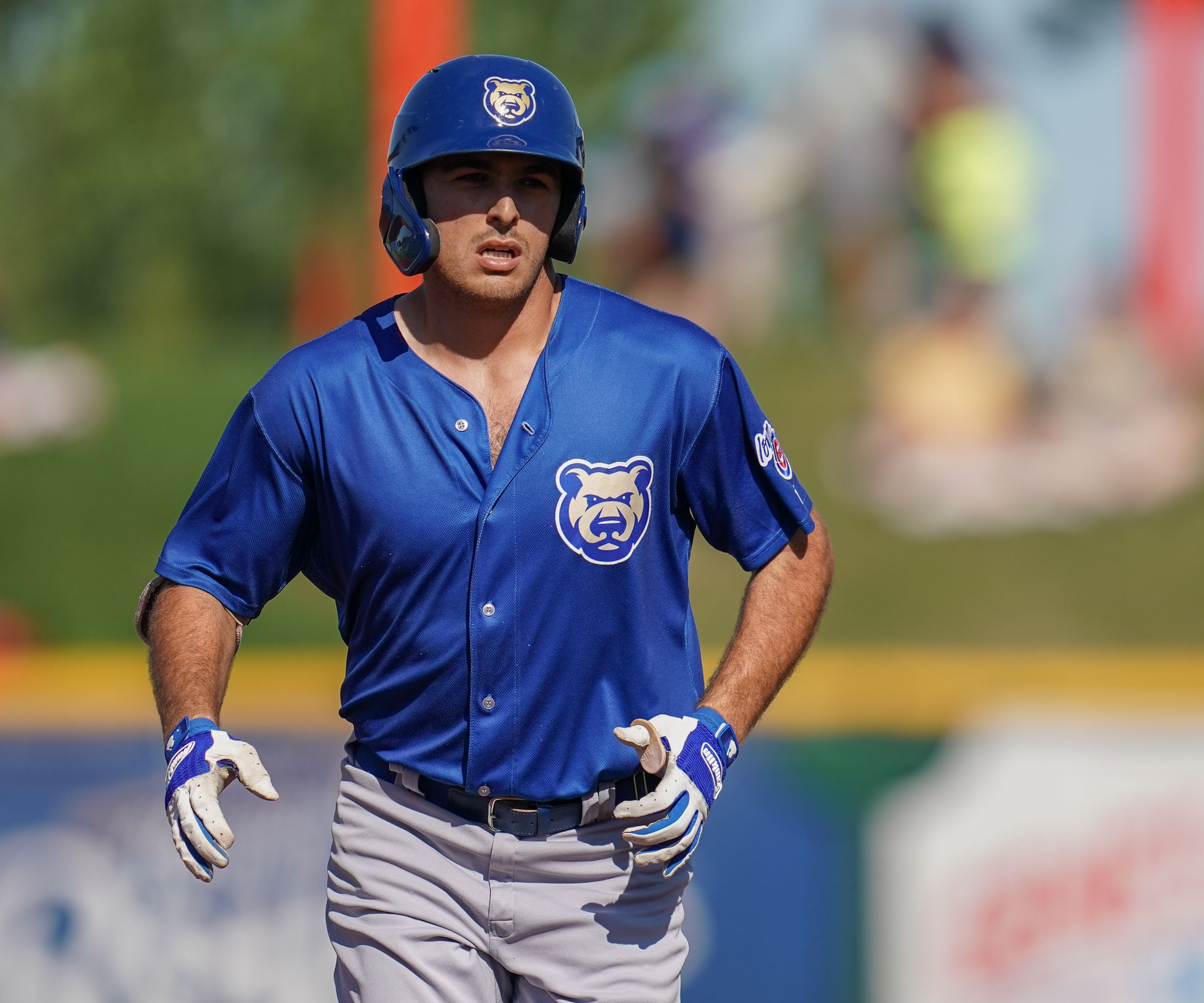
- Mervis with the Iowa Cubs in 2022

Free agent
- First baseman
- Born: April 16, 1998 (age 28); Washington, D.C., U.S.
- Bats: Left Throws: Right

MLB debut
- May 5, 2023, for the Chicago Cubs

MLB statistics (through 2025 season)
- Batting average: .165
- Home runs: 10
- Runs batted in: 28
- Stats at Baseball Reference

Teams
- Chicago Cubs (2023–2024); Miami Marlins (2025)

Matthew Jared Mervis (born April 16, 1998), nicknamed "Mash", is an American professional baseball first baseman who is a free agent. He has previously played in Major League Baseball (MLB) for the Chicago Cubs and Miami Marlins. Mervis played college baseball at Duke University, and signed with the Cubs as an undrafted free agent in 2020. In 2022, he led Minor League Baseball in RBI, and was third with 36 home runs. He played for Team Israel in the 2023 World Baseball Classic.

== Early life ==
Mervis was born in Washington, D.C., to Jeffrey Mervis and Ellen Van Bergen, and is Jewish. His paternal grandmother, Bertina "Tina" Mervis, was born and raised in the city of Givatayim in Israel, and moved to the United States when she was a young adult. He has one older brother and a younger sister. He was raised in Potomac, Maryland.

Mervis attended Georgetown Preparatory School in North Bethesda, Maryland, where he played baseball. He earned a spot on the 2014 Perfect Game Preseason Underclassmen All American Team as a High Honorable Mention. As a junior in 2015, he had a .409 batting average with 39 runs batted in (RBI), while as a pitcher he had a 0.10 earned run average (ERA) and threw a 92 mph (148 km/h) fastball. He was named the 2015 Perfect Game Preseason Underclassmen All American Second Team.

In 2016, as a senior, Mervis batted .348 with two home runs while also posting a 1.13 ERA with 121 strikeouts. He was named the 2016 Perfect Game Preseason Atlantic-All Region First Team. He was selected by the Washington Nationals in the 39th round of the 2016 MLB draft, but did not sign. That summer, he played with the Silver Spring-Takoma Thunderbolts of the Cal Ripken Collegiate Baseball League, and had a .411/.469/.643 slash line over 15 games, with his batting average leading the league and his on-base percentage (OBP) and on-base plus slugging (OPS) ranking third and second, respectively.

== College career ==
After high school, Mervis enrolled at Duke University where he majored in political science and played four years of college baseball as a pitcher, first baseman, and third baseman. In 2017, his freshman year at Duke, he had two doubles over six at bats while pitching to a 2–2 record with a 7.83 ERA and 21 strikeouts over 23 innings pitched. That summer, he briefly played for both the New Bedford BaySox of the New England Collegiate Baseball League and the Hyannis Harbor Hawks of the Cape Cod Baseball League. As a sophomore with Duke in 2018, he collected one hit over four at-bats while going 3–0 with a 4.91 ERA and 21 strikeouts over 25 2/3 innings. That summer, he played for the Kalamazoo Growlers of the Northwoods League. He slashed .316/.395/.450 over 171 at-bats with 27 runs, 11 doubles, four home runs, 28 RBIs, 22 walks, and four sacrifice flies, ending the season in the top five in each statistic, except OBP, where he ranked seventh.

During his junior season at Duke in 2019, he pitched in seven games in which he was 1–0 with a 2.16 ERA and eight strikeouts over 8 1/3 innings, while posting a .274/.358/.421 slash line with six home runs and 31 RBIs in 190 at-bats and 48 starts. That summer, Mervis played with the Cotuit Kettleers of the Cape Cod Baseball League where he slashed .325/.418/.571 with four home runs over 77 at-bats with 24 RBIs and was named a league all-star. His batting average and OBP were third in the league with his OPS ranking tenth and his 24 RBIs ranking eighth. Prior to a shortened senior season at Duke in 2020, he was named the 19th-best senior in the country by Perfect Game and was selected as team captain. He had a .304/.458/.589 slash line with three home runs over 16 games while playing first base, and pitching two scoreless innings in two games, before the season was cancelled due to the COVID-19 pandemic.

== Professional career ==
=== Chicago Cubs ===
==== 2020–21 ====
Mervis went unselected in the five-round 2020 MLB draft, and signed with the Chicago Cubs in June 2020 as an undrafted free agent, as a first baseman. Due to the unique rules of the shortened draft, Mervis only received $20,000 upon signing. He made his professional debut in 2021 with the Myrtle Beach Pelicans of the Low-A East, and also played in three games with the Iowa Cubs of the Triple-A East. Over 72 games between both teams, he batted .208 with nine home runs and 44 RBIs.

==== 2022 ====
Mervis opened the 2022 season with the South Bend Cubs of the High-A Midwest League, for whom he slashed .350/.389/.650 in 100 at bats with 35 runs, seven home runs, and 29 RBIs over 27 games. He was promoted to the Tennessee Smokies of the Double-A Southern League in mid-May, for whom Mervis batted .300/.370/.596 (third in the league)—in 203 at bats over 53 games he had 16 doubles, 14 home runs, and 51 RBIs. In mid-July, he was promoted to Iowa, now a member of the Triple-A International League. The Cubs named him their Minor League Player of the Month for August 2022, during which he batted .305 with a .390 OBP and a .926 OPS for Iowa. Over 57 games with Iowa to end the season, he led the International League with a .983 OPS in 209 at bats with 41 runs, 15 home runs, and 39 RBIs, with a 10% walk rate and a 15% strikeout rate. and slashed .297/.383/.593 (leading the league) With each promotion, he lowered his strikeout rate.

His combined 2022 season totals between South Bend, Tennessee, and Iowa included a .309/.379/.605 slash line with 92 runs, 40 doubles, 36 home runs, and 119 RBIs in 510 at bats. Mervis led all of the minor leagues in 2022 with his 119 RBIs, also led the minors in extra base hits with 78, was tied for second in the minors with 40 doubles, and was third in the minor leagues with 36 home runs. He was named the Cubs 2022 Minor League Player of the Year, and an MiLB Organization All Star.

Mervis was selected to play for the Mesa Solar Sox in the 2022 Arizona Fall League. There, he was chosen as the Arizona Rising Stars MVP, an Arizona Fall League Fall Star, and was named the 2022 Fall Stars Game MVP. He batted .291/.344/.655, and led the league in home runs (six), as well as isolated power (ISO; .364) and at bats per home run (9.17).

==== 2023 ====
Mervis began the 2023 season playing for Triple-A Iowa. Through May 4, Mervis batted .286/.402/.560 in 91 at-bats with 27 runs (3rd in the International League), 6 home runs (10th), 27 RBI (3rd), 18 walks (8th; as against 19 strikeouts), and 2 sacrifice flies (10th).

Mervis was promoted to the major leagues for the first time on May 5, 2023, and made his MLB debut that day, batting 7th and playing first base against the Miami Marlins. Mervis hit his first major league home run on May 16 against the Houston Astros at Minute Maid Park. On June 15, the Cubs optioned Mervis back to Triple-A Iowa after he hit .167/.242/.289 with 3 home runs in 90 at bats, while playing first base. His peripheral statistics were significantly better, as he had a 50% hard hit rate and a 13.8% barrel rate, double the league average.

In 2023 playing for Triple–A Iowa, Mervis batted .282/.399/.533(6th in the league) in 362 at bats with 22 home runs (8th), 78 RBIs (10th), 67 walks (8th), and 5 sacrifice flies (9th). His 15.2% walk percentage was 10th-highest in the International League, and his .932 OPS and .251 isolated power were both 6th.

==== 2024 ====
In January 2024, MLB Pipeline ranked Mervis # 6 on its Top 10 1B Prospects list. After a strong spring training, he was optioned to Triple–A Iowa to begin the 2024 season. In 2024 with Iowa, Mervis batted .235/.329/.434 in 302 at bats with 15 home runs and 43 RBI (with two stints on the injured list), and with the Cubs he went 3-for-26 with 3 RBI.

=== Miami Marlins ===
On December 29, 2024, Mervis was traded to the Miami Marlins in exchange for Vidal Bruján. He made the Marlins' Opening Day roster on March 27, 2025. With six home runs in his first 13 games of the season, Mervis tied the Marlins' franchise record, and also tied as of April 16 for the fourth-most home runs in the major leagues. Mervis was designated for assignment following the promotions of Heriberto Hernández and Jack Winkler on May 30. In 42 appearances for Miami, he slashed .175/.254/.383 with seven home runs and 14 RBI.

He cleared waivers and was sent outright to the Triple-A Jacksonville Jumbo Shrimp on June 2, with whom Mervis batted 250/.309/.625 (5th in the International League) with a .924 OPS and 13 home runs in 149 plate appearances. Mervis was released by the Marlins organization on August 4.

=== Arizona Diamondbacks ===
On August 12, 2025, Mervis signed a minor league contract with the Arizona Diamondbacks organization. He made 30 appearances for the Triple-A Reno Aces, slashing .245/.320/.518 with six home runs, 24 RBI, and one stolen base. Mervis elected free agency following the season on November 6.

=== Washington Nationals ===
On December 24, 2025, Mervis signed a minor league contract with the Washington Nationals. After playing in one game for the Triple-A Rochester Red Wings, he was released by the Nationals organization on April 2, 2026.

=== Algodoneros de Unión Laguna ===
On May 12, 2026, Mervis signed with the Algodoneros de Unión Laguna of the Mexican League; he went 0-for-4 with three strikeouts in his team debut that night. In five total appearances, he was 1-for-18 at the plate (.063) with seven strikeouts. On June 10, Mervis was released by Laguna.

== International career; Team Israel ==
Mervis played for the Israeli national baseball team in the 2023 World Baseball Classic.

== See also ==
- List of select Jewish baseball players
