= Shirley Povich Field =

Baseball stadium in Montgomery County, Maryland, US

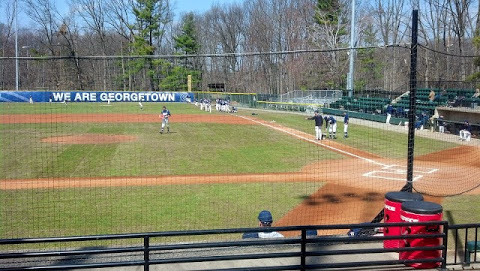
- Shirley Povich Field, Georgetown Hoyas vs UConn Huskies March 23, 2013
- Interactive map of Shirley Povich Field
- Address: Rockville, Maryland
- Coordinates: 39.031053°N 77.150490°W
- Owner: Montgomery County Department of Parks
- Operator: Montgomery County Department of Parks
- Capacity: 800
- Surface: Bermuda grass
- Field size: Left Field: 330 ft Center Field: 375 ft Right Field: 330 ft

Construction
- Groundbreaking: December 18, 1998
- Opened: June 4, 1999

Tenants
- Bethesda Big Train; Georgetown Hoyas baseball

Shirley Povich Field is a baseball stadium in Rockville, Maryland. It is the home field of the Bethesda Big Train of the Cal Ripken Collegiate Baseball League, and was the home field of the Georgetown Hoyas of the Big East Conference. The stadium holds 800 spectators. It is named after Washington Post columnist Shirley Povich. The stadium was created by renovating an existing field at Cabin John Regional Park between December 1998 and June 1999.

As part of an exhibition series to prepare for the Olympics in Japan, the Israel National Baseball Team played Bethesda Big Train in a Friendship Game at Povich Field on July 18, 2021. Team Israel came from behind in the final inning to beat the Big Train 8-7 before a standing room only crowd of 835.

== See also ==
- List of NCAA Division I baseball venues
