= Brett Cecil =

American baseball player (born 1986)

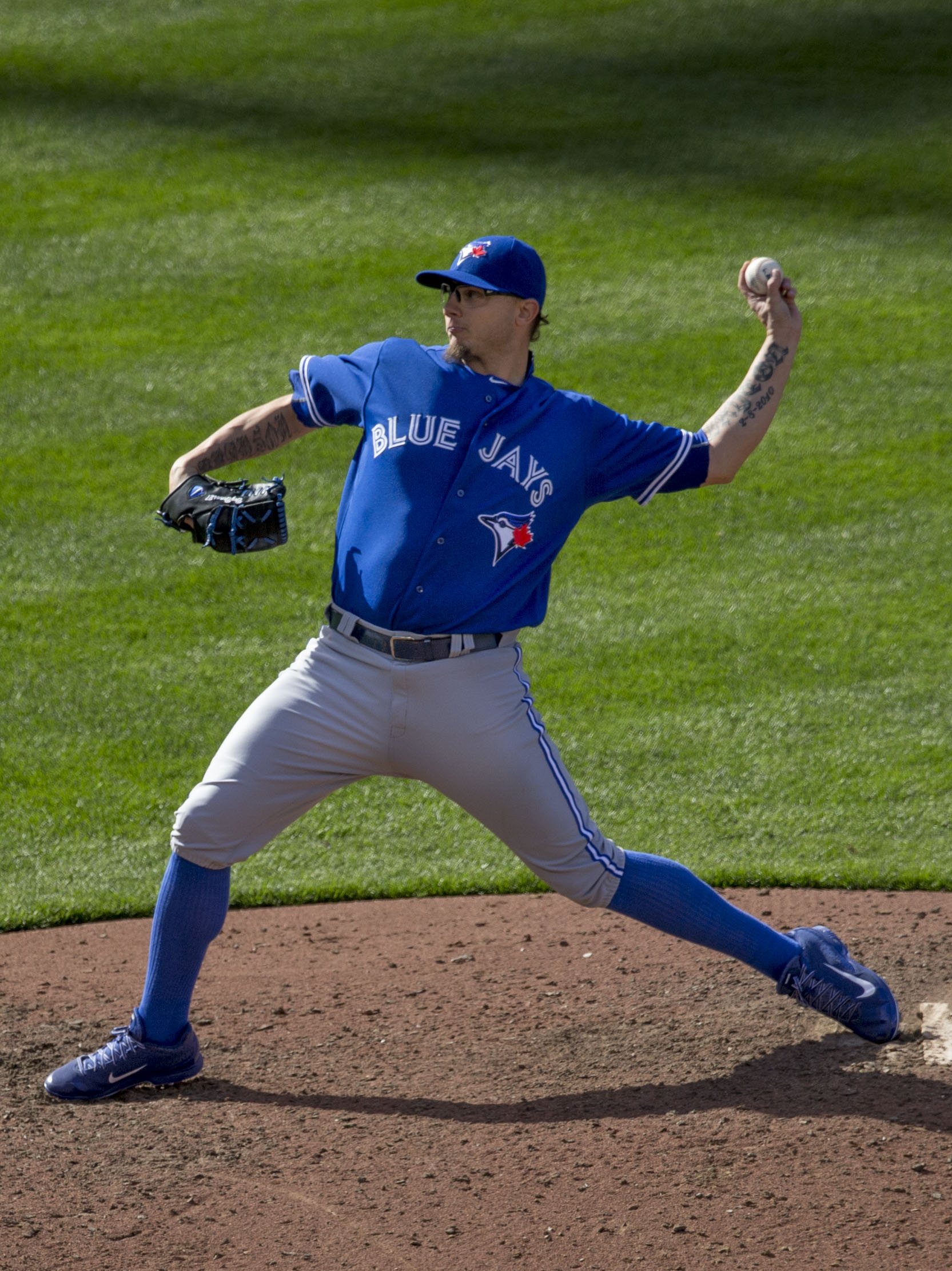
- Cecil with the Blue Jays in 2015
- Pitcher
- Born: July 2, 1986 (age 40); Dunkirk, Maryland, U.S.
- Batted: Right Threw: Left

MLB debut
- May 5, 2009, for the Toronto Blue Jays

Last MLB appearance
- September 25, 2018, for the St. Louis Cardinals

MLB statistics
- Win–loss record: 44–47
- Earned run average: 4.29
- Strikeouts: 670
- Stats at Baseball Reference

Teams
- Toronto Blue Jays (2009–2016); St. Louis Cardinals (2017–2018)

Career highlights and awards
- All-Star (2013)
Medals
Men's baseball
Representing United States
World Baseball Classic
Gold medal – first place	2017 Los Angeles	Team

Brett Aarion Cecil (born July 2, 1986) is an American former professional baseball pitcher. He played in Major League Baseball (MLB) for the Toronto Blue Jays and St. Louis Cardinals. Cecil was drafted as the 38th overall pick in the 2007 MLB draft by the Blue Jays. He pitched for DeMatha Catholic High School and the Maryland Terrapins of the University of Maryland, College Park. In the summer of 2005, he pitched for the Silver Spring-Takoma Thunderbolts in the Cal Ripken Collegiate Baseball League and threw the first and only no-hitter by a single pitcher in league history.

He first pitched in a professional league for the Class A Auburn Doubledays in 2007. In 2008, he was promoted to the Dunedin Blue Jays, and later to the Double-A New Hampshire Fisher Cats, and finally to the Triple-A Syracuse Chiefs. He received an invitation to attend spring training with the Blue Jays in 2009, but began the season in Triple-A.

Although he pitches left-handed, he is usually right-handed; pitching is "the only thing he does left-handed".

== Amateur career ==
Cecil was born in Dunkirk, which is in Calvert County, Maryland. He first started playing baseball when he was eight years old near his southern Maryland home. As he got older, his father would drive him more than 20 miles (32 km) each way to White Marsh Park in Bowie, Prince George's County, where there was more competition. As a teenager, he attended DeMatha Catholic High School, also in Prince George's County. Upon graduation from DeMatha, he stayed in Prince George's County and attended the University of Maryland. In 2006, he played collegiate summer baseball for the Orleans Cardinals of the Cape Cod Baseball League and was named a league all-star.

== Professional career ==
=== Toronto Blue Jays ===
==== 2009 ====
Cecil was called up to the Toronto Blue Jays on May 1, 2009, and made his major league debut on May 5 as the starting pitcher against the Cleveland Indians at home. In that game, Cecil pitched six innings, giving up two runs, one earned, and six hits but was credited with a no-decision in a game Toronto eventually won. His next start was May 10 against the Oakland Athletics, pitching 8 scoreless innings to earn his first Major League win. Cecil defeated the Chicago White Sox, keeping Toronto in first place, but then gave up five home runs to the Boston Red Sox on May 21, losing his first game, as Toronto went on a nine-game losing streak and dropped out of first place. Cecil was returned to AAA after losing to Boston, and then pitched solidly for the Las Vegas 51s. Continued injury problems for Blue Jays' pitchers led to Cecil being recalled to the major leagues on June 18, and he started against the Washington Nationals on June 20, filling in for the injured Casey Janssen and Roy Halladay, pitching 7 innings while allowing 3 earned runs in a no-decision, in a game Toronto lost in 12 innings.

==== 2010 ====
Originally not making the rotation for the Blue Jays, Cecil was called up early in the season and became a regular in the Jays rotation along with Ricky Romero, Shaun Marcum and Brandon Morrow. On May 3, 2010, he took a perfect game into the seventh inning against the Cleveland Indians, but walked Grady Sizemore with one out. Then, two batters later, he allowed a single to Jhonny Peralta which scored Sizemore from second to end his no-hitter and his shutout. He ended up going 8 innings, allowing one hit, two walks, one run, and 10 strikeouts. Despite not making the original team out of spring training he led the team in wins with 15, along with a much improved 4.22 ERA.

==== 2011 ====
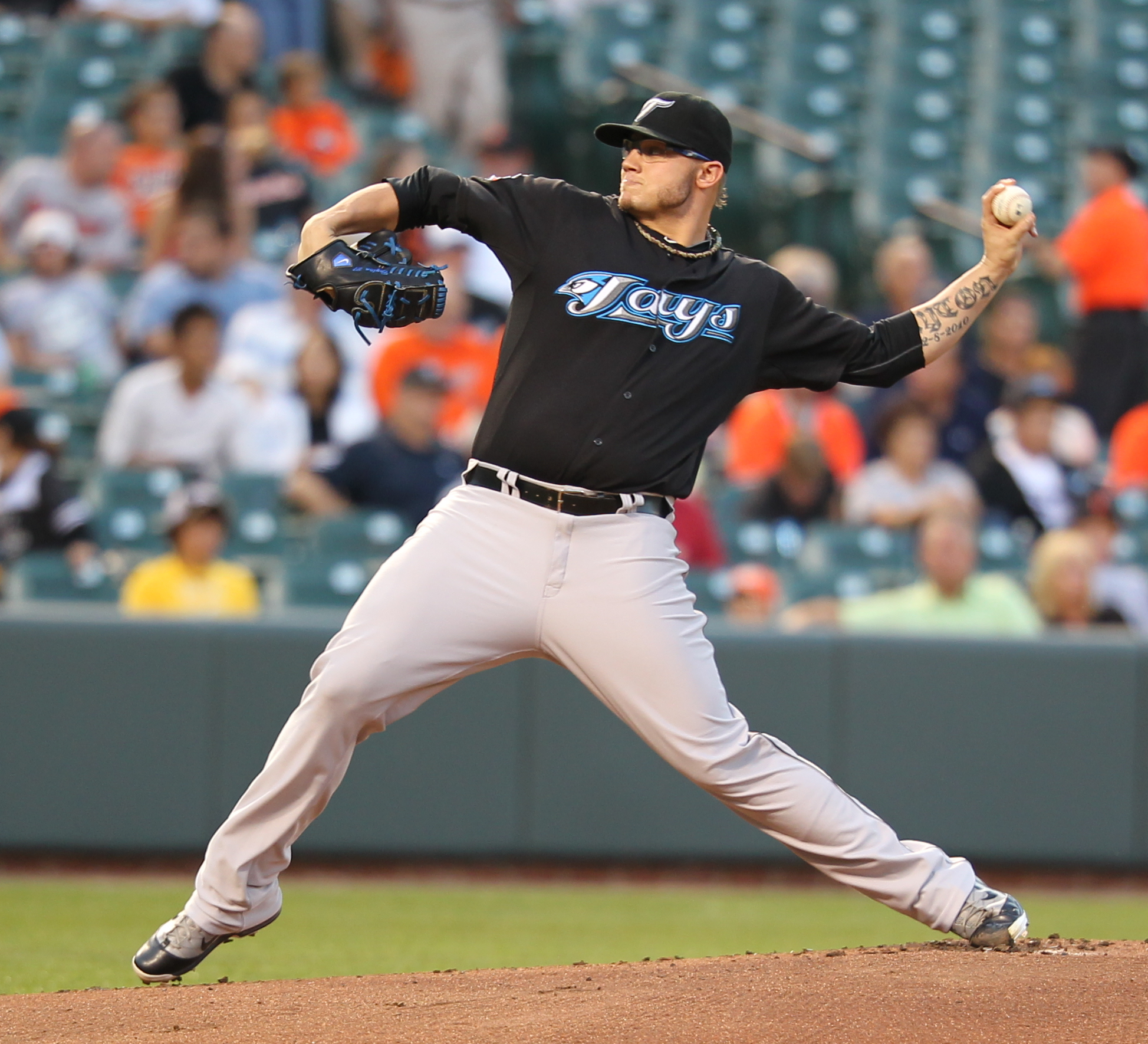
Cecil in 2011

To start the 2011 season, Cecil went 1–2 with a 6.86 ERA, which led to the Blue Jays optioning him to Triple-A, in order to make room for Chris Woodward on the 25-man roster. He was later recalled in late June and lost in his first start, against the Pittsburgh Pirates. On July 24, he pitched his first complete game shutout against Texas Rangers. Cecil finished the 2011 season with a 4–11 record and an ERA of 4.73.

==== 2012 ====
Cecil did not make the Blue Jays roster out of spring training, and was assigned to Triple-A Las Vegas. After Kyle Drabek was placed on the disabled list, Cecil was called up on June 15. After posting a 2–4 record with a 5.72 ERA through nine starts, Cecil was demoted to Triple-A Las Vegas 51s on August 4.

==== 2013 ====
Cecil started the 2013 season in the Blue Jays bullpen. On June 19, against the Colorado Rockies, Cecil broke the club record for facing the most consecutive batters without allowing a hit, set by David Cone with 36. Cecil's hitless streak ended after 43 consecutive batters on June 25, against former teammate Yunel Escobar and the Tampa Bay Rays. On July 6, Cecil was named to the AL All-Star Team, which was special for Cecil considering the fact that it is rare for a mid relief pitcher to earn an All-Star appearance. Cecil pitched 1/3 of an inning in the All-Star Game, striking out Domonic Brown on 3 pitches. On July 31, Cecil recorded his first career save in a 5–2 win over the Oakland Athletics. He was placed on the disabled list on September 17, ending his 2013 campaign with a 5–1 record, 2.82 earned run average, and 70 strikeouts over 60 2/3 innings.

==== 2014 ====
In January 2014, Cecil filed for salary arbitration with Toronto, but came to terms on a 1-year, $1.3 million contract on January 17. He pitched the entire season out of the bullpen, making a career-high 66 appearances. In 53 1/3 innings pitched, Cecil posted a 2–3 record with a 2.70 ERA and 76 strikeouts. He also recorded 5 saves, and gave up only 2 home runs for the entire season.

==== 2015 ====
On January 15, Cecil signed a one-year, $2.475 million contract with Toronto to avoid salary arbitration. With the departure of Casey Janssen in the offseason, the role of closer was left vacant into spring training. On March 24, manager John Gibbons named Cecil the Blue Jays' closer to open the 2015 season. Cecil struggled to open the 2015 season, and lost the closer role early to rookie Miguel Castro. On April 28, Cecil was moved back into the closer role. After yielding 8 earned runs in his previous 2 1/3 innings pitched, Cecil was again removed from the closer role on June 23. From June 24 through the end of the season, Cecil did not allow an earned run, lowering his ERA from 5.96 to 2.48. He was named to the postseason roster and appeared in both of the Blue Jays first two games, however he suffered a calf injury in the second game. Afterward it was determined that he would miss the remainder of the postseason with a tear in his left calf muscle.

==== 2016 ====
On January 15, 2016, Cecil and the Blue Jays avoided salary arbitration by agreeing to a one-year, $3.8 million contract. Cecil pitched his 38th consecutive scoreless appearance on April 4 against the Tampa Bay Rays, which tied the MLB record for consecutive scoreless appearances set by Craig Kimbrel in 2011. In 2016 he was 1–7 with a 3.93 ERA. He became a free agent following the season.

=== St. Louis Cardinals ===
==== 2017 ====
Cecil signed a four-year, $30.5 million contract with the St. Louis Cardinals on November 21, 2016. In 2017, he was 2–4 with a 3.88 ERA in 73 relief appearances.

==== 2018 ====
Cecil began the year on the 10-day disabled list, and was activated on May 11. He was placed on the disabled list once again on July 27 due to right foot inflammation. He was activated on August 15. Cecil finished his 2018 campaign with a 1–1 record and a 6.89 ERA in 32.2 relief innings pitched.

==== 2019 ====
For the second straight year, Cecil began the year on the 10-day injured list. He was transferred to the 60-day IL on March 29, and did not pitch at all during the season. During the off-season from the 2019–2020, and during the quarantine caused by the COVID-19 pandemic, he developed a sidearm delivery due to the fact that Cardinals pitching coach, Mike Maddux, said that all pitchers should experiment with anything they wanted during quarantine.

==== 2020 ====
Cecil was released by the Cardinals organization on July 22, 2020.

=== Retirement ===
Cecil announced his retirement from professional baseball on November 7, 2021, via Instagram.

== Personal life ==
Cecil and his ex-wife, Jennifer, have three children: two sons and a daughter.

== See also ==
- List of Toronto Blue Jays team records
- List of Toronto Blue Jays first-round draft picks
- 2007 Major League Baseball draft
- 2013 Major League Baseball All-Star Game
- 2019 St. Louis Cardinals
