= Youse's Maryland Orioles =

Collegiate summer baseball team in Linthicum, Maryland, US

Information
- League: Cal Ripken Collegiate Baseball League (2005–2014)
- Location: Linthicum, Maryland
- Ballpark: Bachman Park
- Post-Season Tournament championships: 2008
- League championships: 2008, 2007

Youse's Maryland Orioles were a collegiate summer baseball team based in Linthicum, Maryland. Most of its players were drawn from the college ranks. The team was a member of the Cal Ripken Collegiate Baseball League (CRSCBL) from its founding in 2005 through the end of the 2014 season. The Maryland Orioles played their weekday home games at Bachman Park and weekend games at Calvert Hall High School. Since its founding in 1952, the team had sent at least 48 players to the Major Leagues, including Hall of Famers Al Kaline and Reggie Jackson.

== History ==
Youse's Maryland Orioles were founded in 1952 by the Leone Family of Baltimore Maryland. Although the team has changed name and management on several occasions since then, it has been in continuous operation. The team currently competes in both the Cal Ripken Collegiate Baseball League and the All America Amateur Baseball Association ("AAABA").

Named for Walter Youse, who served as head coach from 1957 to his death in 2005, the team is sometimes called the "Orioles Scouting Team. The team has won the AAABA Championship 26 times. The team joined the CRSCBL as a founding team in 2005 and has tied for the season championship of that league once, in 2007. In 2008 the Orioles won the 2008 regular season with a record of 34–7 and won the post-season tournament. In 2008 the team also won its 26th AAABA title, and its sixth consecutive AAABA title.

== Championships ==
All-American Amateur Baseball Association

- 2008
- 2007
- 2006
- 2005
- 2004
- 2003

Cal Ripken Collegiate Baseball League

- 2010 Regular Season Champions 2nd team eliminated out of 4 in playoffs
- 2008 Regular Season and Tournament Champions
- 2007 (Tied with the Rockville Express)

== Notable alumni ==
- Steve Clevenger
- Gavin Floyd
- Reggie Jackson
- Todd Jones
- Al Kaline
- John Mabry
