= Jonathan Papelbon =

American baseball pitcher (born 1980)

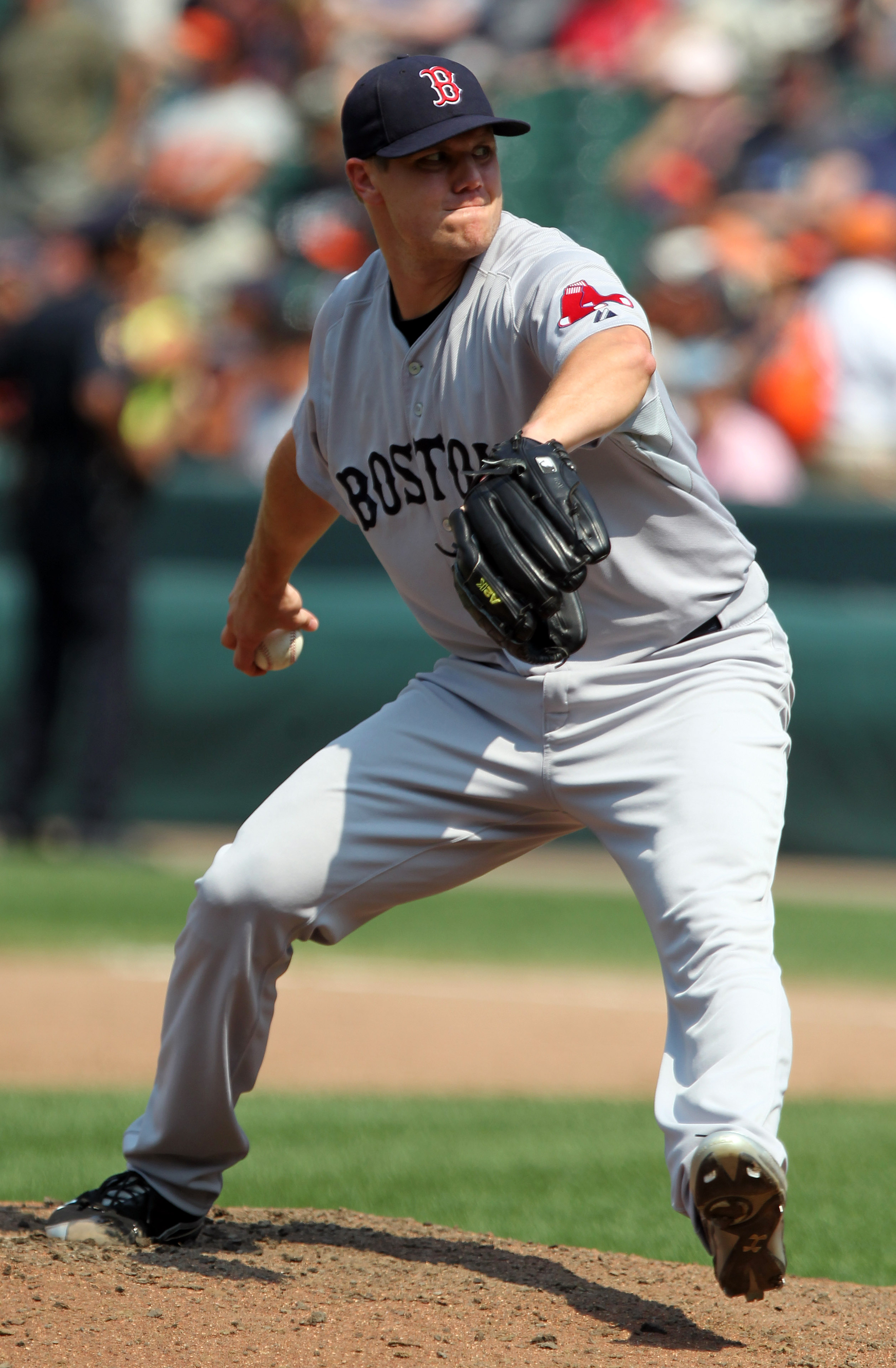
- Papelbon with the Red Sox in 2011
- Pitcher
- Born: November 23, 1980 (age 45); Baton Rouge, Louisiana, U.S.
- Batted: Right Threw: Right

MLB debut
- July 31, 2005, for the Boston Red Sox

Last MLB appearance
- August 6, 2016, for the Washington Nationals

MLB statistics
- Win–loss record: 41–36
- Earned run average: 2.44
- Strikeouts: 808
- Saves: 368
- Stats at Baseball Reference

Teams
- Boston Red Sox (2005–2011); Philadelphia Phillies (2012–2015); Washington Nationals (2015–2016)

Career highlights and awards
- 6× All-Star (2006–2009, 2012, 2015); World Series champion (2007); Delivery Man of the Year (2007); Pitched a combined no-hitter on September 1, 2014; Boston Red Sox Hall of Fame

Jonathan Robert Papelbon (/ˈpæpəlbɒn/; born November 23, 1980) is an American former professional baseball relief pitcher. He played 12 seasons in Major League Baseball (MLB), most notably for the Boston Red Sox, with whom he was an All-Star in four consecutive seasons (2006–2009), won the 2007 Delivery Man of the Year Award, and was a 2007 World Series champion. The Red Sox drafted Papelbon in the fourth round of the 2003 Major League Baseball draft, and he played three seasons of minor league baseball before breaking into the majors. He also pitched for the Philadelphia Phillies from 2012 to 2015, and the Washington Nationals during 2015 and 2016.

== Early life ==
Jonathan Robert Papelbon was born on November 23, 1980, in Baton Rouge, Louisiana. He is the oldest son of three to John, a staff sergeant in the United States Army, and Sheila, a corporate trust banker. In college, Sheila had been a pitcher for the softball team at Louisiana State University, and all of her children grew up to become baseball pitchers. Papelbon attended Bishop Kenny High School in Jacksonville, Florida, where he was a standout first baseman for the school baseball team. He was named All-City for three consecutive years, and during his senior year in 1999, Papelbon batted .336 with five home runs and 27 runs batted in (RBI). He pitched only occasionally, but threw two no-hitters that same year.

== College career ==
In his senior year of high school, Papelbon committed to play college baseball for Mississippi State University.

Papelbon was a closer for the Mississippi State Bulldogs and had a 9–6 record with 13 saves and 2.90 ERA in his three years on the team. During his time at MSU, the Bulldogs appeared in the 2001 and 2003 NCAA tournaments and won the 2001 SEC tournament. During the summer after his freshman year, Papelbon played with the Silver Spring-Takoma Thunderbolts in suburban D.C., a summertime collegiate baseball team then in the Clark Griffith Collegiate Baseball League (now in the Cal Ripken Sr. Collegiate Baseball League). During the subsequent summers of his college career Papelbon played for the Danville Dans, a summer baseball team in Danville, Illinois. Soon after arriving in Danville, he led the team to a CICL championship.

In the 2002 MLB draft, the Oakland Athletics selected Papelbon with a 40th-round draft pick. The team was taking a chance with the pick in the hopes that Papelbon would agree to leave Mississippi State after his junior year, but Athletics scouting director Eric Kubota said Papelbon was firm in his decision to return to school. Papelbon graduated from Mississippi State in 2003.

== Professional career ==
=== Minor leagues ===
Papelbon was drafted by the Boston Red Sox in the fourth round of the 2003 Major League Baseball draft. Papelbon began his minor league career as a starting pitcher for the Lowell Spinners of the New York–Penn League. In 13 games (six started), he had a 1–2 record, a 6.34 ERA, 43 hits, 36 strikeouts, and 9 walks in 32 2/3 innings pitched.

After a 13–10 record for Class-A Lowell Spinners and Sarasota Red Sox from 2003 to 2004, Papelbon was 5–2 in 14 starts for Double-A Portland in 2005. Promoted to Triple-A Pawtucket, he went 1–2 with a 3.57 ERA in four starts, walking two and striking out 21 in 22 1/3 innings.

=== Boston Red Sox (2005–2011) ===
==== 2005 ====
Papelbon made his major league debut with the Red Sox on July 31, 2005, against the Minnesota Twins, in which he went 5 1/3 innings, struck out seven batters and issued five walks in Boston's 4–3 victory. He did not receive a decision. Papelbon earned his first major league win on September 12, pitching three scoreless innings in an extra-inning game against the Toronto Blue Jays. In two postseason appearances in 2005, he pitched four scoreless innings against the eventual World Series Champion Chicago White Sox. The Red Sox had plans of slotting Papelbon into their starting rotation prior to the regular season in 2006. However, the incumbent closer, Keith Foulke, proved to be ineffective trying to come back from an injury-plagued 2005.

==== 2006 ====
In April 2006, Papelbon changed his hair to a Mohawk style, after Charlie Sheen's character Ricky Vaughn from the film Major League due to a wager with teammate Kevin Youkilis in which they bet whether he could start the season with 10 scoreless innings.

On April 5, the third game of the 2006 season, Papelbon recorded his first career save, against the Texas Rangers. On April 29, he set a major league record with his 10th save, against the Tampa Bay Devil Rays, becoming the first rookie in major league history to record double-digit saves in the month of April. He subsequently received the Delivery Man of the Month Award for April. In early September, Papelbon injured his shoulder. When the Red Sox were eliminated from playoff contention, he was shut down for the remainder of the season to rest. The team considered using Papelbon as a starter due to his shoulder problems, but he was moved back to the bullpen before the start of the 2007 season and remained the team's closer. Papelbon in 2006 saved 35 games, struck out 75 batters in 68 innings, and held opposing batters to a .167 batting average.

==== 2007 ====
On October 11, 2007, Papelbon was named the 2007 winner of the "DHL Presents the Major League Baseball Delivery Man of the Year Award." Papelbon garnered 39,043 votes out of almost 125,000 votes cast.

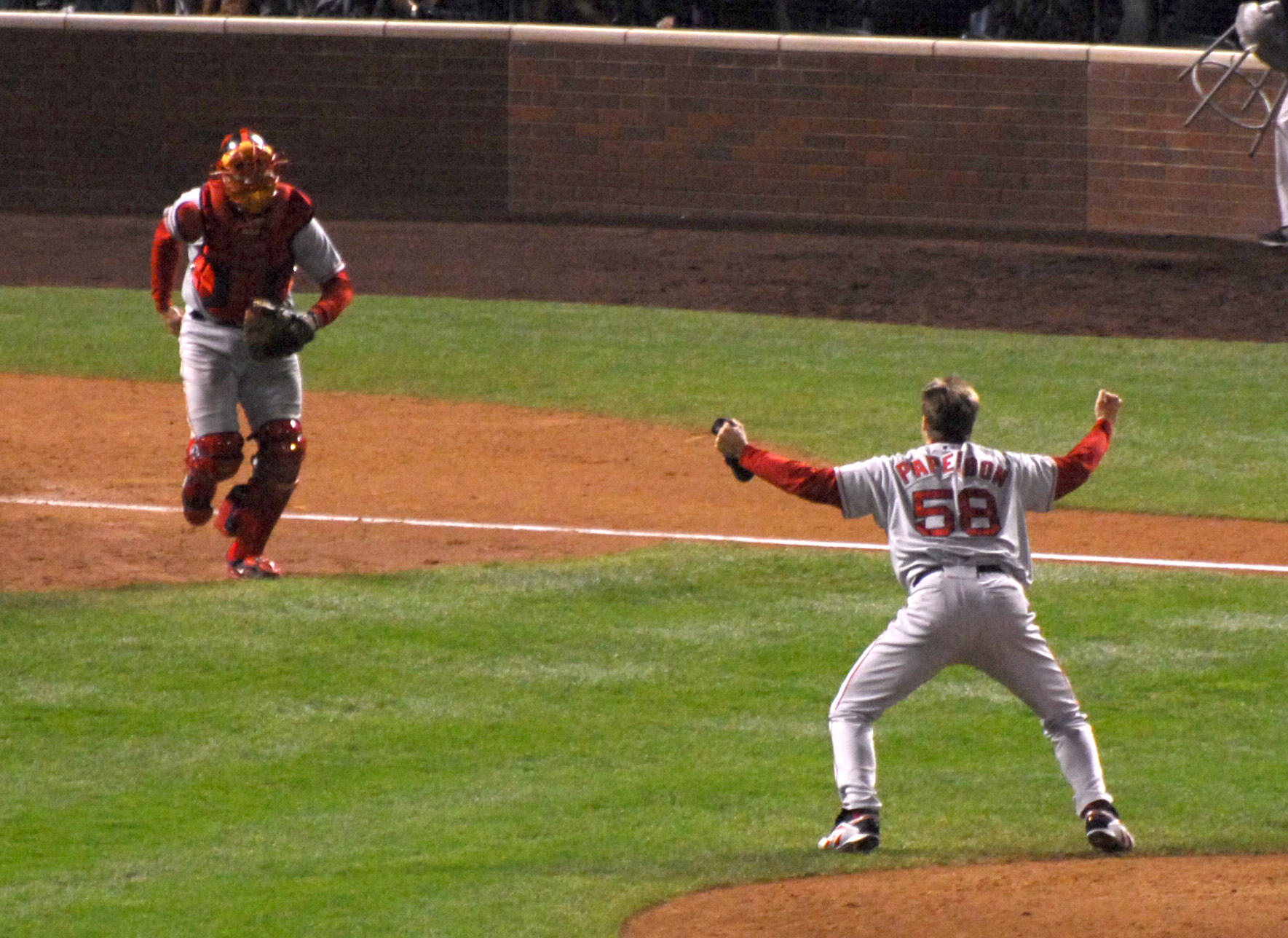
Papelbon celebrates the Red Sox victory in the 2007 World Series.

In Game 2 of the World Series, Papelbon was brought in with the bases empty and two outs in the eighth with the Red Sox leading 2–1 to face Rockies hitter Matt Holliday. Papelbon gave up a single to Holliday before picking him off to end the inning. Papelbon pitched a one-two-three ninth for the save. In Game 4, he entered in the eighth inning to shut down the Rockies' comeback, and pitched the ninth inning where he struck out Seth Smith to clinch the 2007 Championship for the Red Sox.

==== 2008 ====
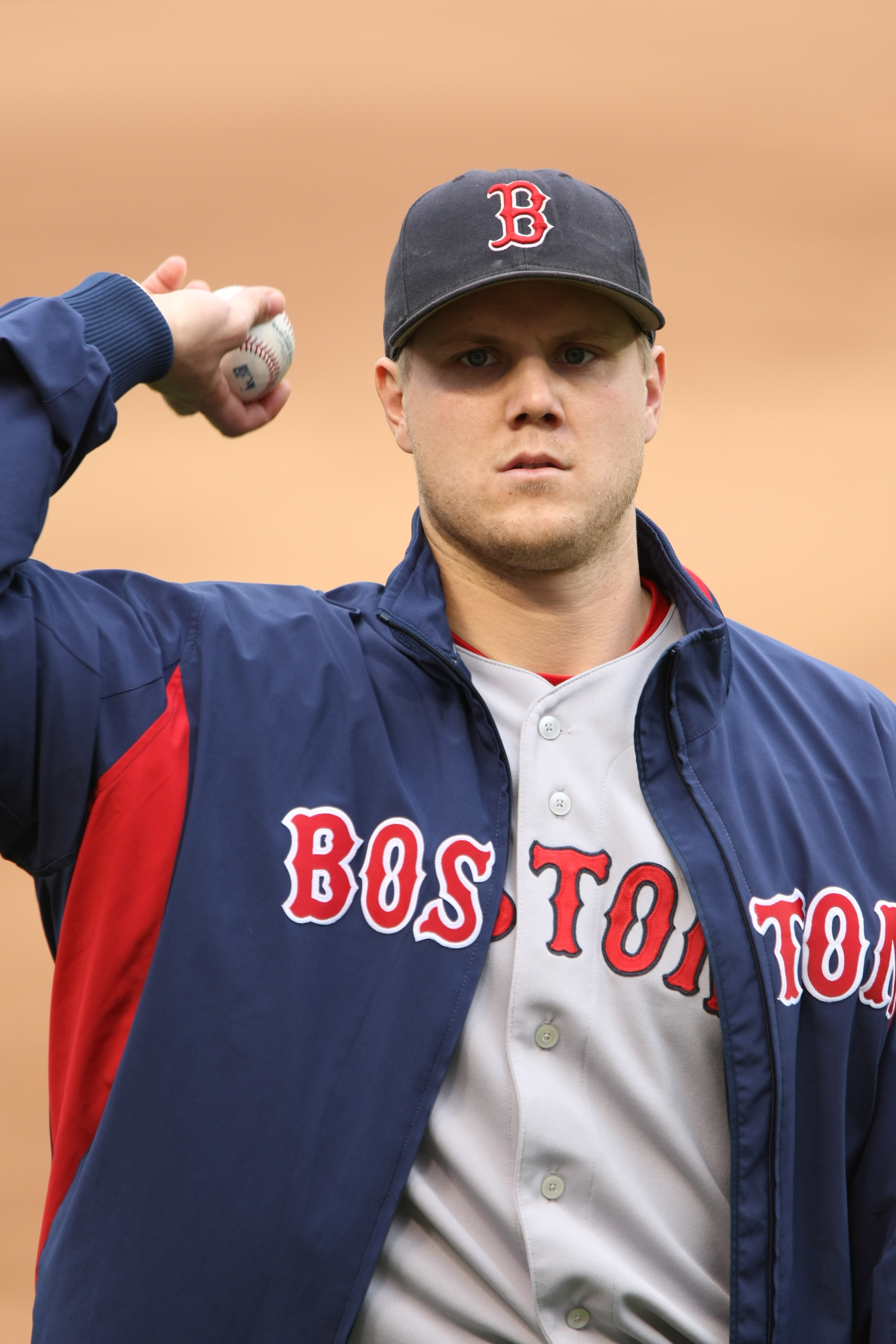
Papelbon during a pregame warmup in 2008

On March 6, 2008, Papelbon agreed to terms with the Red Sox for $775,000. Papelbon's deal set the record for the largest contract for a closer not eligible for salary arbitration, topping Mariano Rivera's previous record by $25,000. Boston was under no obligation to pay Papelbon more than the league minimum of $390,000. On January 20, 2009, Papelbon agreed to a one-year $6.25 million contract with the Red Sox, avoiding arbitration. This was the largest contract for a closer in his first year of arbitration eligibility. Papelbon recorded his 100th career save on July 13, 2008. Among pitchers who had thrown at least 200 innings, Papelbon's 0.930 WHIP through 2008 was the lowest in major league history.

==== 2009 ====
Papelbon criticized former teammate Manny Ramirez in the April 2009 issue of Esquire magazine, citing his selfishness and incapability of working with his teammates.

On June 29, 2009, Papelbon gained his 132nd save, in a 4–0 shut out against the Baltimore Orioles, tying Bob Stanley's team record for saves which had stood for 20 years. Stanley prophetically commented to the Boston Herald in reference to Papelbon breaking the record "He’s a great kid and competitor. If anyone’s going to break it, that’s a good guy to do it. He’s probably going to end up with a lot more than 132." On July 1, Papelbon recorded his 133rd save with the Red Sox, to break the franchise record. He was selected to represent Boston at the 2009 All-Star Game.

Papelbon was cited repeatedly for his slow play. On September 4, 2009, it was reported that he had been fined $5,000 for failing to deliver his first pitch within the required time in a September 1 appearance. Papelbon told the Boston Herald that he had been cited on at least five occasions, and fined more than $10,000 for these violations. Papelbon jokingly added, "I think they're going to call my parole officer and put me away."

In Game 3 of the 2009 ALDS, with Boston down two games to none, Papelbon failed to make the save and Boston was swept. He allowed four hits and three runs; all of the runs scored with two outs. His difficulties continued into the next season.

==== 2010 ====
In 2010, Papelbon failed in eight save attempts (including one against the Yankees on May 17, 2010, where he allowed four earned runs and a walk-off home run for the first time in his career), leaving open the possibility that he might be traded. The Red Sox kept Papelbon as their closer and his productivity improved over the 2011 season.

==== 2011 ====
On June 7, 2011, Papelbon recorded his 200th career save against the New York Yankees, and achieved the mark in the fewest appearances (359), beating Mariano Rivera's mark in 382 appearances. For the 2011 season, Papelbon recorded 31 saves in 34 opportunities. He blew just three saves all season long, but two occurred during the final month of the season, including the final game of the 2011 regular season; the Red Sox and Rays tied in the standings for the AL Wild Card, and Papelbon blew a 3–2 lead against the Baltimore Orioles in the ninth inning when he struck out the first two batters, but then gave up three consecutive hits, leading to a walk-off 4–3 loss. Just moments later, the Rays won their game against the Yankees with a walk-off home run by Evan Longoria to clinch the Wild Card, which capped off both an improbable late comeback from a 7–0 deficit in the eighth inning and a nine-game comeback in the standings against Boston and officially eliminating them from the playoffs. Following the 2011 World Series, Papelbon became a free agent.

=== Philadelphia Phillies (2012–2015) ===
==== 2012 ====
In November 2011 Papelbon agreed with the Philadelphia Phillies on a four-year, $50 million contract (equivalent to $71.6 million in 2025) with a vesting option for a fifth year, bringing the total possible contract value to $60 million. It was the largest contract ever signed by a relief pitcher. He was signed to fill the role of former closer Ryan Madson, who left to join the Reds.

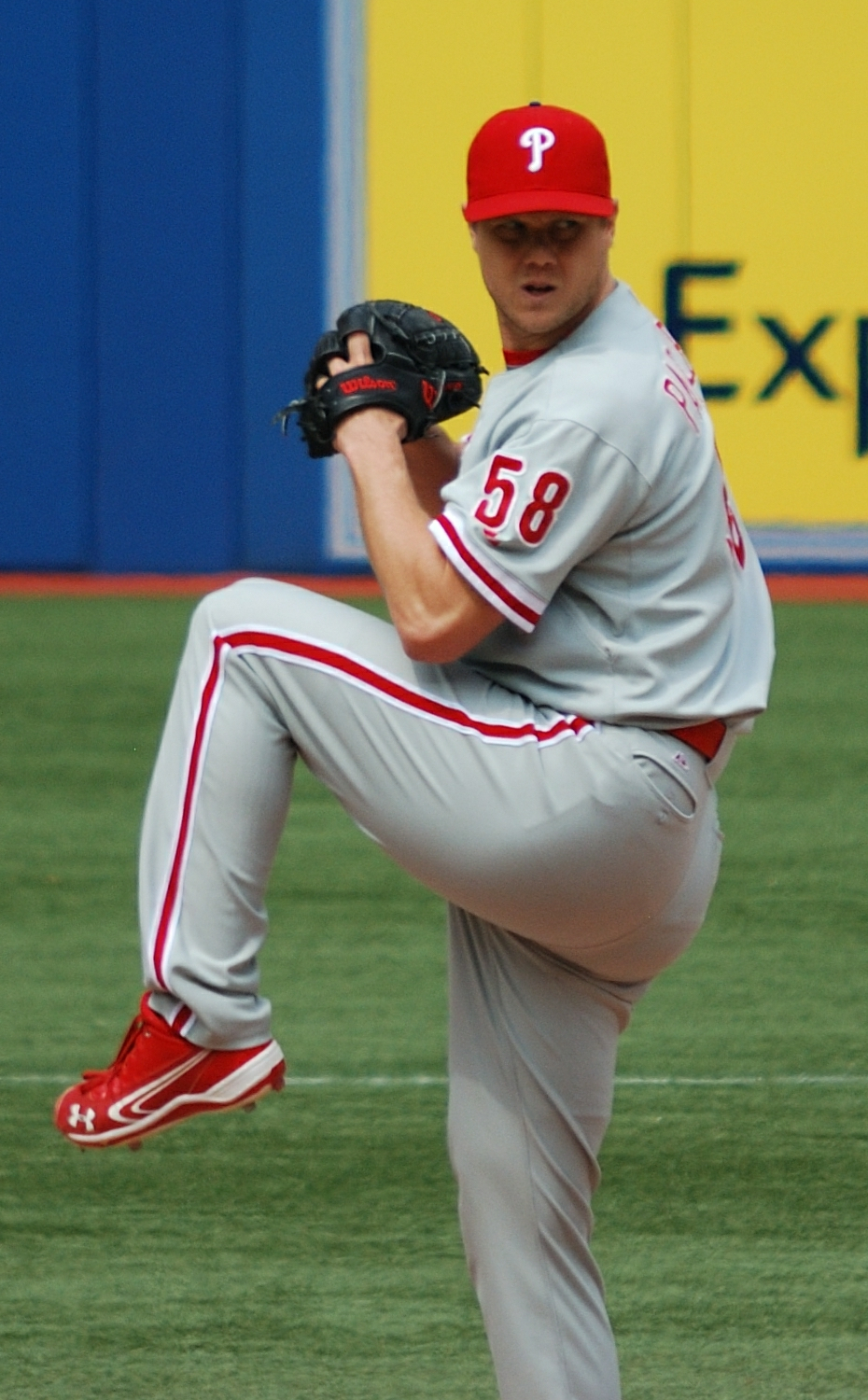
Papelbon pitching for the Philadelphia Phillies in 2012

During April, Papelbon started using Metallica's song "For Whom the Bell Tolls" as his entrance music. Papelbon finished the season with 64 games finished (leading the National League), 38 saves, 92 strikeouts, and a 2.44 ERA over 70 innings pitched.

==== 2013 ====
Papelbon finished the 2013 season with 29 saves in 61 games. His save total was the lowest of any of his complete MLB seasons to that point, and the Phillies finished with a 73–89 win–loss record. Papelbon said that he could not remember playing for another losing team. He lost more than two miles per hour off of his average fastball velocity, and after the season he said he had been playing with an injured hip.

==== 2014 ====
On June 10, Papelbon earned his 300th career save against the San Diego Padres, becoming the 27th member of the 300 save club. On August 26, Papelbon recorded his 100th save with the Philadelphia Phillies becoming tied for fourth on the all-time franchise saves list. On September 1, Papelbon was one of four pitchers who combined for a no-hitter in the Phillies' 7–0 win over the Atlanta Braves.

On September 14, 2014, Papelbon blew a save against the Miami Marlins, and was booed by the hometown Phillies fans at Citizens Bank Park. He then made an obscene gesture toward the fans, for which he was ejected from the game. He initiated a confrontation with umpire Joe West, who had thrown him out of the game, and was subsequently suspended by MLB for seven games. His high school coach said: "The persona that I think he exhibits makes ... fans ... dislike [him]. Unless you're a Phillies fan ... and even some of them don't like him."

==== 2015 ====
In April 2015, he had a heated argument with radio/TV commentator Howard Eskin in the Phillies clubhouse, and the two needed to be separated and restrained. On May 13, Papelbon became the Phillies all-time saves leader with 113 saves.

=== Washington Nationals ===
==== 2015 ====
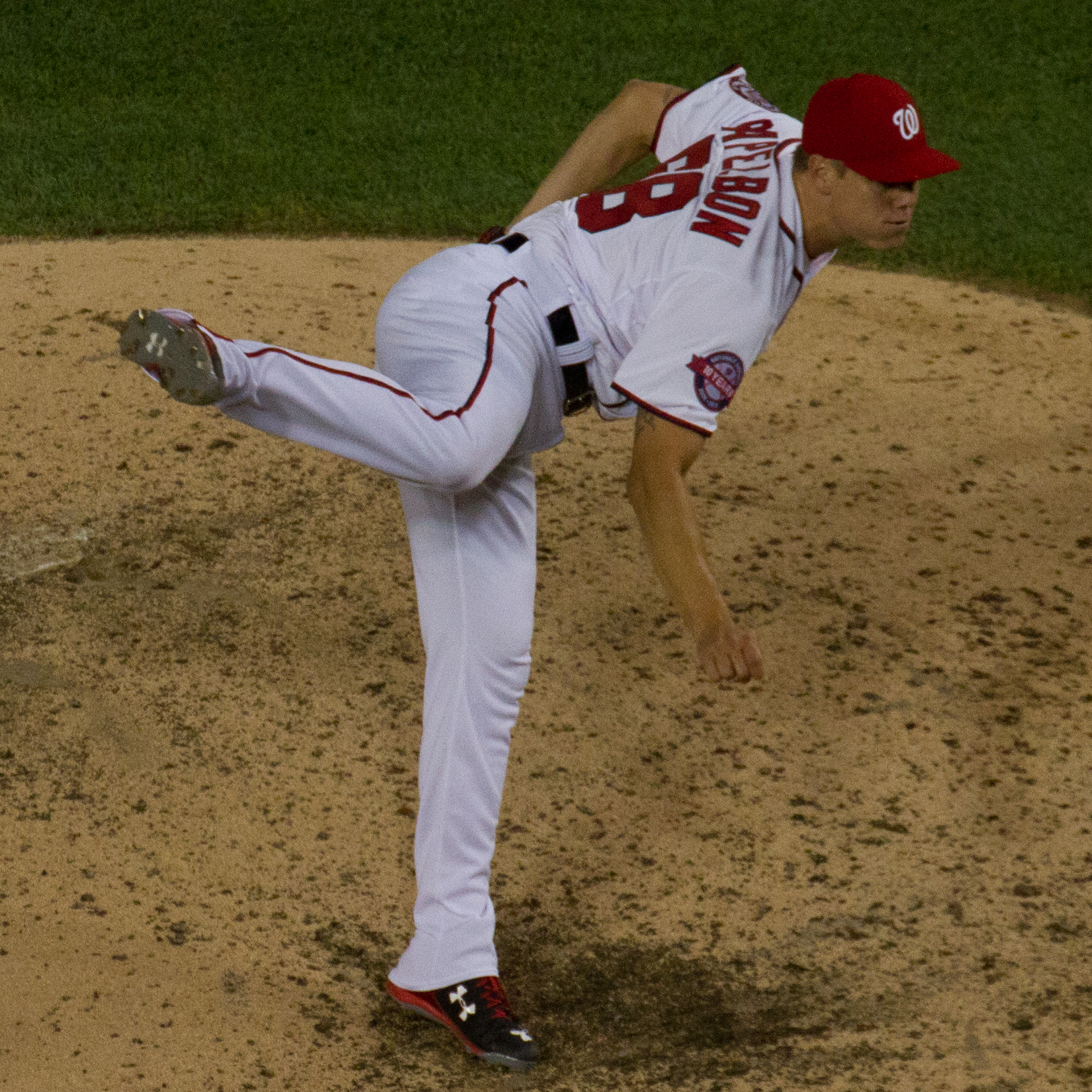
Papelbon with the Nationals

Papelbon began to express discontent with being on the Phillies as the trade deadline inched closer. On July 28, 2015, the Phillies traded Papelbon to the Washington Nationals for Nick Pivetta. Papelbon assumed the role of Nationals' closer from Drew Storen.

On September 23, Papelbon intentionally threw a pitch at Manny Machado's head, resulting in immediate ejection. Machado tried to dodge the ball from hitting his head by throwing up his left shoulder and the ball hit his shoulder. The hit by pitch came after Machado hit a go-ahead home run in the 7th off of Max Scherzer which gave the Orioles the lead and the win. Two days later, MLB suspended Papelbon for three games and fined him; he initially appealed the suspension.

Papelbon initiated an argument with teammate Bryce Harper during their September 27 game, as Harper was returning to the dugout following his at bat. The exchange escalated, and Papelbon grabbed Harper by the throat and then shoved Harper toward the bench with both hands, before the two were separated by teammates. Nats fans on Twitter offered to donate $100 each (totaling thousands of dollars) to a charity of the Nats' choosing if they got rid of Papelbon. The Nationals suspended Papelbon for four games without pay for attacking Harper, costing Papelbon $284,153. Papelbon dropped his appeal of his suspension for hitting Machado. With seven games remaining for the Nationals, the pair of suspensions ended his season. Papelbon finished the season with seven saves with the Nationals, and 24 in total for the season. On December 6, 2015, Papelbon filed a grievance complaint against the Nationals organization, seeking the money he lost when he was suspended.

==== 2016 ====
During the offseason, Storen was traded to the Toronto Blue Jays, cementing Papelbon as the team's closer. On June 14, 2016, Papelbon was placed on the 15-day disabled list due to an Intercostal muscle strain, the first stint on the disabled list in his career. The team acquired Mark Melancon to supplant him as closer in late July.

On August 13, Papelbon requested and was granted his release from the Nationals. The Nats released Papelbon despite still being obligated to pay him $3.3 million over the remainder of the season. In 2016, Papelbon was 2–4 with a career-worst 4.37 ERA and 19 saves for the Nationals.

== Pitching style ==
Papelbon's velocity fueled much discussion about his overall value as a pitcher. Around 2011, his four-seam fastball reached 95 miles per hour (153 km/h), but by 2013, one column on FanGraphs asserted that his velocity was "on the down side of that mountain", and that, for a reliever, he did not strike out enough hitters. Peter Gammons tweeted that some teams were not interested in acquiring Papelbon because of his velocity decline as well as poor performance in clutch situations — in 2013, he converted only five of nine one-run save opportunities.

Papelbon threw three pitches. His predominant pitch was the fastball, which he cut with "hard sweeping movement", particularly effectively against left-handed hitters. He also threw an occasional two-seam fastball, which averaged 92 miles per hour (148 km/h). Secondarily, he threw a splitter, which he utilized as a strikeout pitch and particularly "work[ed] well with the fastball". His tertiary pitch was a sweeping slider, the velocity of which was around 76 miles per hour (122 km/h).

== Personal life ==
Papelbon and his wife, Ashley Jefferies, live in Hattiesburg, Mississippi. They have two children: a daughter born December 27, 2008, and a son born April 17, 2010.

Papelbon’s younger brother, Josh, played college baseball as a pitcher at the University of North Florida and was drafted by the Red Sox in the 46th round of the 2006 MLB draft. His other brother, Jeremy, also pitched at the University of North Florida and was drafted by the Chicago Cubs in the 19th round of the 2006 MLB draft.

He appeared on the Late Show with David Letterman on October 31, 2007, after the Red Sox won the 2007 World Series. On December 20, 2007, Papelbon claimed that his dog "Boss" chewed up the ball that recorded the final out of the 2007 World Series. Papelbon is an avid fan of the Jacksonville Jaguars and attended games at TIAA Bank Field after the completion of the baseball season.

His Red Sox teammate Curt Schilling said of Papelbon: "He's not exactly a charter member of Mensa." His former general manager Theo Epstein observed: "He's not a Rhodes Scholar ... obviously." Esquire's Chris Jones had a slightly different take, writing: "Papelbon's not stupid. He just hasn't acquired ... an understanding of consequence: He says all the dumb things most of us probably think but keep back."

== Honors, awards, and records ==
=== Honors ===
Papelbon appeared on the 2022 ballot for the National Baseball Hall of Fame. He appeared on only five ballots (1.3% of submissions), falling short of the five percent voter threshold required to appear on future ballots.

=== Awards and records ===
- 6x All-Star (2006, 2007, 2008, 2009, 2012, 2015)
- Holds the single-season record for most saves in a season by a Red Sox rookie (2006)
- First pitcher in Boston Red Sox franchise history to have three 30 save seasons
- Holds the Major League record for most consecutive scoreless innings to start a postseason career (25)
- One of only two (Craig Kimbrel) and first pitcher to record 25 saves in each of his first five full seasons; he recorded 30 in each of those years
- Was the fastest pitcher in MLB history to reach 200 career saves (later surpassed by Craig Kimbrel)
- Philadelphia Phillies All-Time Saves Leader (113 saves)
- Boston Red Sox All-Time Saves Leader (219 saves)

== See also ==
- List of Major League Baseball career saves leaders

Preceded by Tim Lincecum	No-hit game September 1, 2014 (with Hamels, Diekman & Giles)	Succeeded by Jordan Zimmermann
