= Gavin Sheets =

American baseball player (born 1996)

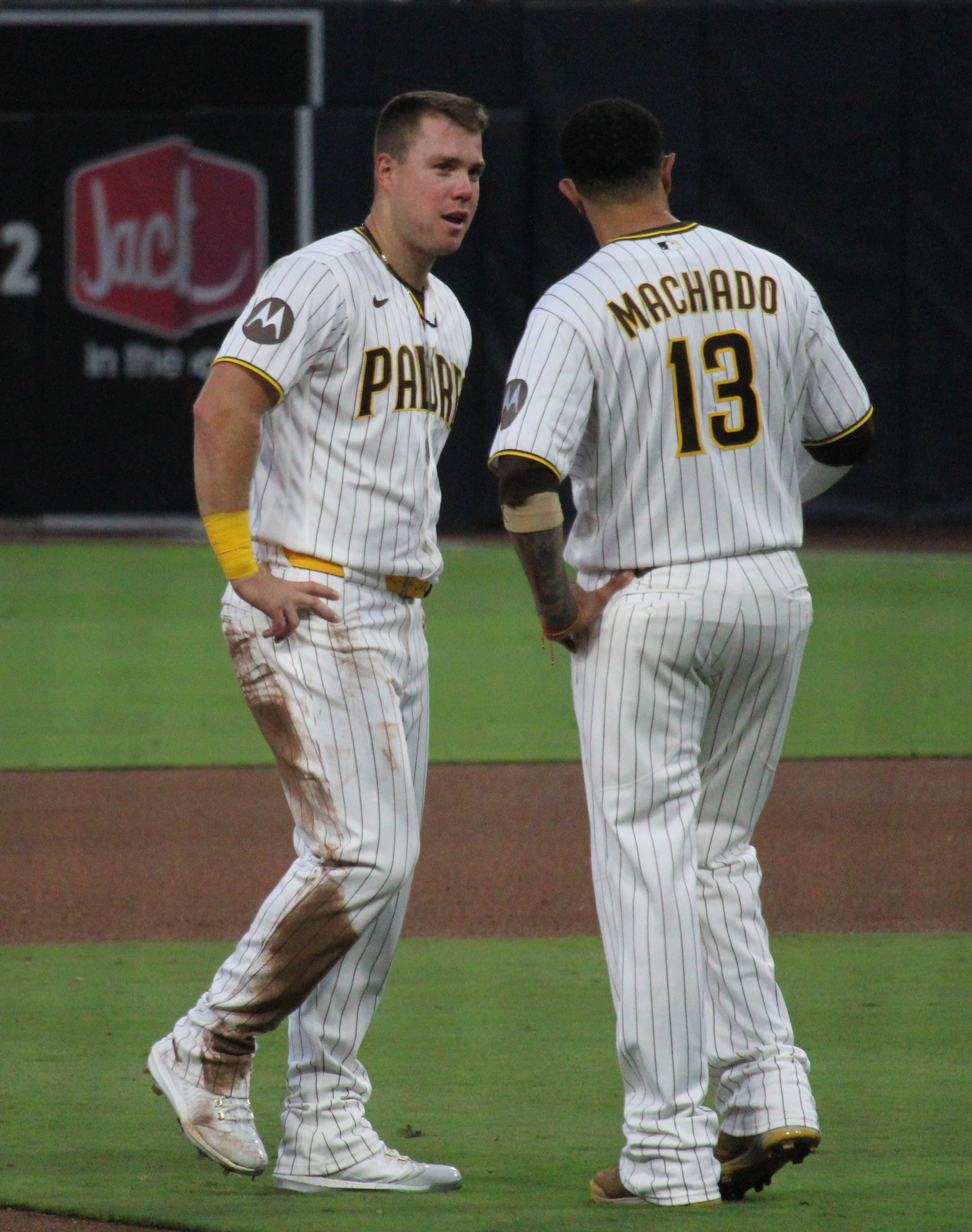
- Sheets with the Padres in 2026

San Diego Padres – No. 30
- Left fielder / First baseman
- Born: April 23, 1996 (age 30); Lutherville, Maryland, U.S.
- Bats: Left Throws: Left

MLB debut
- June 29, 2021, for the Chicago White Sox

MLB statistics (through 2026 season)
- Batting average: .232
- Home runs: 82
- Runs batted in: 294
- Stats at Baseball Reference

Teams
- Chicago White Sox (2021–2024); San Diego Padres (2025–present)

Gavin Crawford Sheets (born April 23, 1996) is an American professional baseball first baseman for the San Diego Padres of Major League Baseball (MLB). He has previously played in MLB for the Chicago White Sox. He made his MLB debut in 2021.

== Amateur career ==
Sheets attended Gilman School in Baltimore, Maryland. The Atlanta Braves selected him in the 2014 Major League Baseball draft. He did not sign with the Braves, and instead enrolled at Wake Forest University to play college baseball for the Wake Forest Demon Deacons. In 2016, he played collegiate summer baseball with the Wareham Gatemen of the Cape Cod Baseball League. In 2017, his junior season, Sheets batted .317 with 21 home runs and 84 RBIs in 63 games and was named All-Atlantic Coast Conference. He also played for the Baltimore Redbirds of the Cal Ripken Collegiate Baseball League.

== Professional career ==
=== Chicago White Sox ===
==== 2017–2020 ====
The Chicago White Sox selected Sheets in the second round, with the 49th overall selection, of the 2017 Major League Baseball draft. Sheets signed with the White Sox, receiving a $2 million signing bonus. He began his professional career with the Arizona White Sox of the Rookie-level Arizona League. After playing four games in Arizona, the White Sox promoted him to the Kannapolis Intimidators of the Single-A South Atlantic League. Sheets posted a combined .279 batting average, four home runs, and 28 RBI in 56 games between both clubs.

Sheets spent 2018 with the Winston-Salem Dash of the High-A Carolina League, where he slashed .293/.368/.407 with six home runs and 61 RBI in 119 games. He spent 2019 with the Birmingham Barons of the Double-A Southern League, batting .267/.345/.414 with 16 home runs and 83 RBI over 126 games. He was selected to play in the Arizona Fall League for the Glendale Desert Dogs following the season. Sheets did not play in a game in 2020 due to the cancellation of the minor league season because of the COVID-19 pandemic, and was not invited to participate at the White Sox' alternate training site.

On November 20, 2020, the White Sox added Sheets to their 40-man roster in order to protect him from the Rule 5 draft. Sheets began the season with the Charlotte Knights of the new Triple-A East, and in addition to playing first base, he received his first professional games in the outfield.

==== 2021–2024 ====
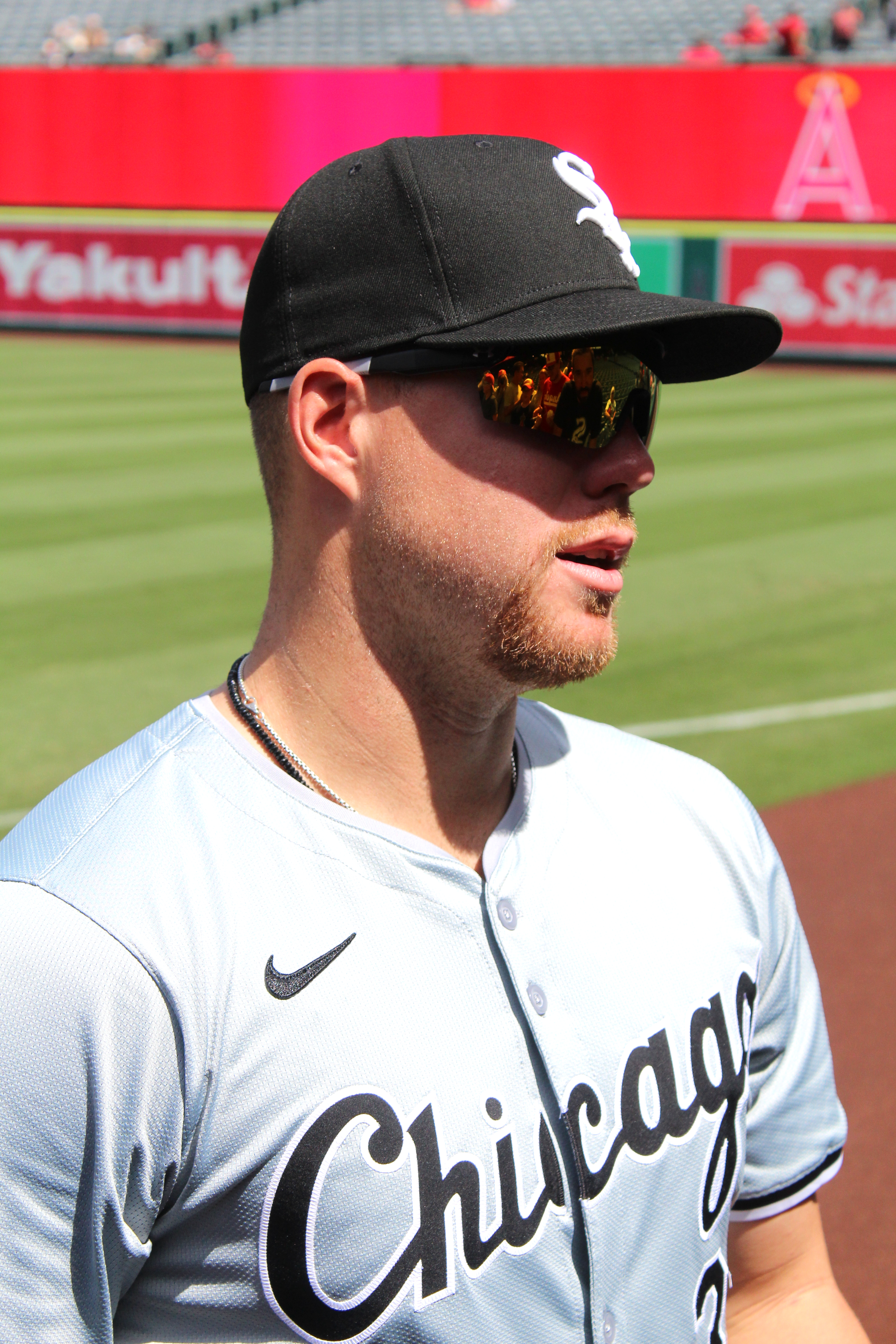
Sheets in 2024

On June 3, 2021, following the placement of regular left fielder Andrew Vaughn on the COVID-19 injured list, Sheets was recalled to the major league team, but was sent back down to Charlotte following Vaughn's return two days later, without appearing in a game. Sheets was promoted to the major leagues for a second time on June 29.

Sheets made his MLB debut that day as the starting right fielder against the Minnesota Twins, and recorded his first major league hit — a single to left field — off Kenta Maeda . In that same game, he recorded his first major league RBI, his first extra base hit, and scored his first major league run, all off Maeda. On June 30, he hit his first major league home run, off of Matt Shoemaker. On July 19, during the second game of a doubleheader, Sheets recorded his first career walk-off hit, with a three run home run off José Berríos, to win the game 5–3. Overall in 2021, Sheets appeared in 54 games, posting a .250 batting average, while hitting 11 home runs and driving in 34 runs. Sheets was added to the postseason roster that same year. He made his postseason debut in game 1 against the Houston Astros, going 0-for-4. In game 4, Sheets hit his first postseason home run, off Lance McCullers Jr., which would be the only run the White Sox would score in that game, as they lost 10–1 and were eliminated.

In 2023 with the White Sox, Sheets batted .203/.267/.331 in 311 at–bats. Against left-handers, he batted .053 with an OPS of .103 in 20 plate appearances. On defense, he had a fielding run value of −6, placing him in the 13th percentile in MLB.

Sheets made 139 appearances for Chicago in 2024, slashing .233/.303/.357 with 10 home runs and 45 RBI. On November 22, 2024, the White Sox non–tendered Sheets, making him a free agent.

=== San Diego Padres ===
On February 9, 2025, Sheets signed a minor league contract with the San Diego Padres. On March 20, the Padres selected Sheets' contract after he made the team's Opening Day roster. On Opening Day, he hit a solo home run off of Atlanta Braves pitcher Héctor Neris in his first at bat as a Padre.

== Personal life ==
He is the son of former Major League Baseball outfielder Larry Sheets. He is married to Kahla Sheets. They have one daughter together. Sheets is a Christian.
