= Nolan Schanuel =

American baseball player (born 2002)

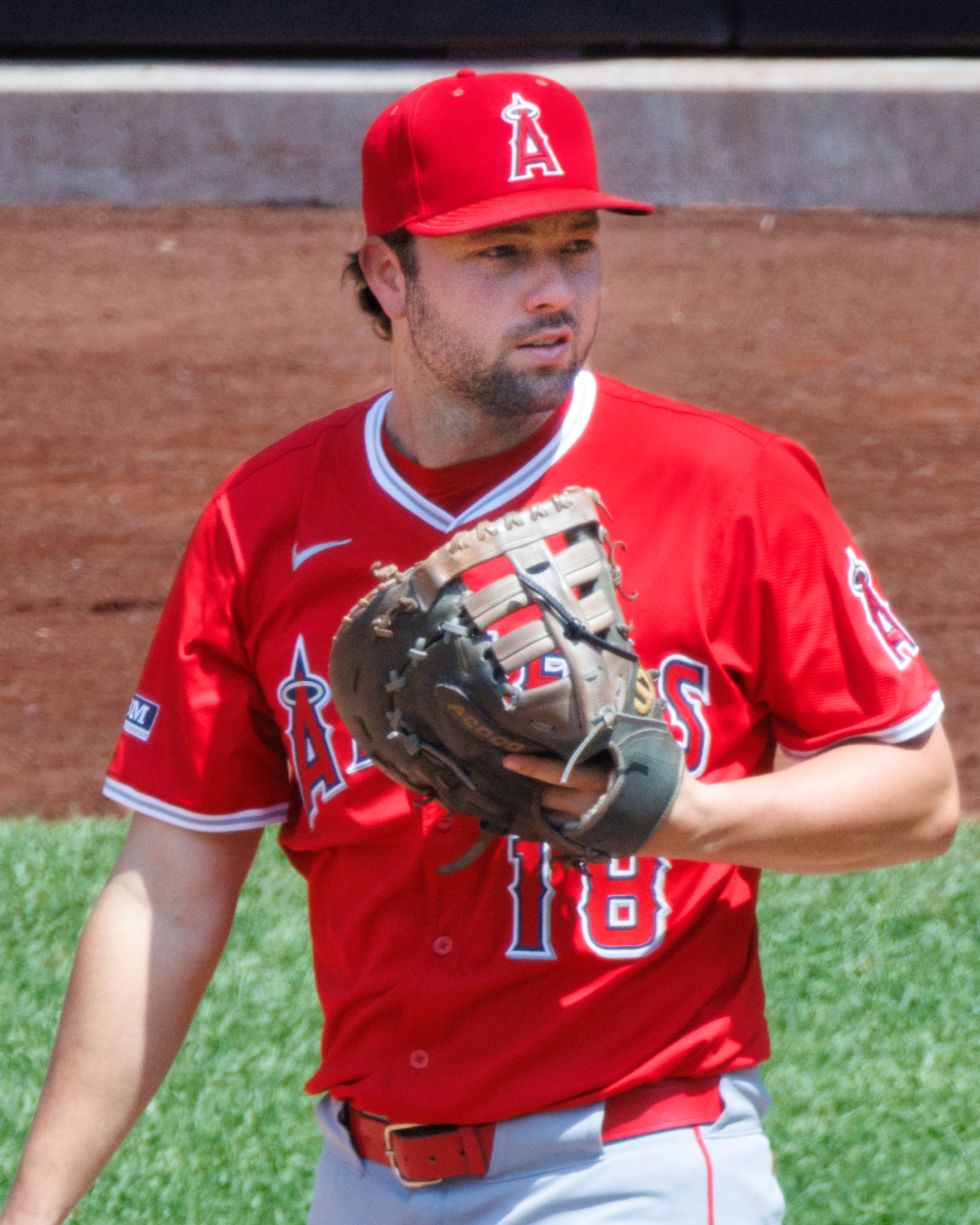
- Schanuel with the Los Angeles Angels in 2025

Los Angeles Angels – No. 18
- First baseman
- Born: February 14, 2002 (age 24); Boca Raton, Florida, U.S.
- Bats: Left Throws: Right

MLB debut
- August 18, 2023, for the Los Angeles Angels

MLB statistics (through 2026 season)
- Batting average: .263
- Home runs: 33
- Runs batted in: 162
- Stats at Baseball Reference

Teams
- Los Angeles Angels (2023–present)

Nolan Ryan Schanuel (/ˈʃænjuːɛl/ SHAN-yew-el; born February 14, 2002) is an American professional baseball first baseman for the Los Angeles Angels of Major League Baseball (MLB). He played college baseball for the Florida Atlantic Owls.

Schanuel grew up in the South Florida city of Boynton Beach and attended Park Vista Community High School, where he emerged as a star baseball player. He played three seasons of college baseball at nearby Florida Atlantic, receiving national honors as one of the best players at the amateur level. Schanuel entered the 2023 Major League Baseball draft with consideration as a top prospect and was selected in the first round by the Angels with the 11th overall pick. He made his major league debut 40 days later, the quickest debut for a position player in 45 years.

== Early life ==
Nolan Ryan Schanuel was born on February 14, 2002, in Boca Raton, Florida, to Ryan and Erin Schanuel. The third word he ever learned was "ball", and he began hitting with a plastic baseball at 18 months old.

Schanuel grew up in Boynton Beach, Florida and attended Park Vista Community High School. In 2018–19, his junior season, he posted a .446 batting average with 12 extra-base hits, 22 runs batted in (RBIs), and 27 runs scored. Following the season, he was named as a first-team All-American as an outfielder. On November 13, 2019, prior to the start of his 2019–20 senior season, Schanuel signed his National Letter of Intent to play college baseball for the Florida Atlantic Owls. In his final year at Park Vista, Schanuel was batting .520 with 10 RBIs and 14 runs scored before the remainder of the season was canceled in response to the COVID-19 pandemic. In his high school baseball career, Schanuel struck out only 16 times in 175 at-bats, a strikeout rate of 9.14%.

== College career ==
=== 2021 ===
Schanuel enrolled at Florida Atlantic University, 14 miles from his hometown, to play college baseball for the Owls ahead of the 2020–21 academic year. Prior to beginning with the Owls, he played collegiate summer baseball with the Boynton Beach Buccaneers of the South Florida Collegiate Baseball League, where he batted .269 with five RBIs in 23 games.

In his freshman season at FAU, Schanuel played first base for the first time in his career. He aided in an opening weekend series victory over the nationally ranked UCF Knights by going 8-for-15 (.533) with a home run and eight RBIs; he later was named Conference USA (C-USA) Hitter of the Week. He had a two-home run game on two occasions, first against the Seton Hall Pirates on February 27 and later against the Charlotte 49ers on April 4.

Schanuel finished his first season batting .343 with 11 home runs and 56 RBIs. He batted .409 with runners in scoring position and walked (28) more than he struck out (21). At first base, he committed only two errors and posted a .996 fielding percentage, the second-highest in FAU history. Following the season, he was named a freshman All-American by the Collegiate Baseball Newspaper and Perfect Game USA. He was also named to the all-conference second team. He spent the summer with the Bethesda Big Train of the Cal Ripken Collegiate Baseball League, batting .333 with three home runs and 24 RBIs in 24 games.

=== 2022 ===
Prior to his 2021–22 sophomore season, Schanuel was named a preseason All-American by Perfect Game USA. On April 5, he was named to the Golden Spikes Award midseason watchlist, awarded annually to the best player in college baseball.

Schanuel finished the season batting .369 with 16 home runs and 56 RBIs. He was named to the all-conference first team. In 2022, he played collegiate summer baseball with the Hyannis Harbor Hawks of the Cape Cod Baseball League, where he batted .200 with a home run and 11 RBIs in 36 games.

=== 2023 ===
Schanuel was named the C-USA preseason player of the year ahead of his 2022–23 junior season. On February 28, he had a two-home run game against the Miami Hurricanes. On March 7, he hit three home runs in a game against the Florida Gators, the eventual 2023 Men's College World Series runners-up, at Condron Ballpark in Gainesville. Schanuel reached base safely in 54 consecutive games, the longest streak in all of NCAA Division I that year.

Schanuel finished the season batting .447 with 19 home runs and 64 RBIs. Following the season, Schanuel was selected as a first-team All-American by five different publications, including Collegiate Baseball, Baseball America, and the American Baseball Coaches Association. He was selected to the all-conference first team and was named the C-USA Player of the Year. Schanuel was one of 25 semifinalists for the Golden Spikes Award. His 71 walks was a new school record and his .615 on-base percentage (OBP) was a new conference record.

== Professional career ==
=== Los Angeles Angels ===
==== Draft and Minor Leagues ====
The Los Angeles Angels selected Schanuel in the first round of the 2023 Major League Baseball draft with the 11th overall pick. He was the highest draft pick in Florida Atlantic baseball history and also was the first student-athlete in school history to be selected in the first round of a professional sports draft. On July 13, Schanuel agreed to a slot-value signing bonus with the Angels, worth $5.253 million.

On July 21, Schanuel was assigned to the rookie-level Arizona Complex League Angels. He made his professional debut that day, going 2-for-3 with an RBI double, a run scored, and a stolen base against the ACL Diamondbacks.

On July 25, Schanuel was promoted to the Single–A Inland Empire 66ers of the California League, and was promptly promoted to the Double-A Rocket City Trash Pandas of the Southern League on July 28. He slashed .339/.480/.475 with 16 walks, one home run and 12 RBIs in 16 games at Double-A.

==== 2023: MLB debut after 40 days from the draft ====
On August 18, 2023, Schanuel was selected to the Angels' major league roster directly from Double-A, only 40 days after he was drafted. Schanuel's promotion was the fastest since Ariel Prieto in 1995 and the fastest for a position player since Brian Milner in 1978.

Schanuel made his debut that day, becoming the first member of the 2023 MLB draft class to debut. In his first game, he scored his first career run on a grand slam hit by Shohei Ohtani, recorded his first major league hit with a single off Jason Adam in the seventh inning, and helped turn a triple play in the ninth inning.

Schanuel recorded a hit in each of his first ten games, setting an Angels franchise record for longest hitting streak to begin a career. He reached base safely in all 29 games he played, setting a franchise record and tying Enos Slaughter for the third-longest on-base streak to start a major league career. Schanuel finished his abbreviated first season batting .275 with a home run and six RBIs in 109 at-bats.

==== 2024: Rookie season ====
Before 2024 season, Schanuel was considered as one of the top prospects for the season, and also was one of the youngest players on Opening Day rosters.

From the start of the season, Schanuel continued his on-base streak to begin a major league career, but it retroactively ended at 30 games after a scoring change on April 6. MLB changed his infield single on March 30 to a catching error. If not for this scoring change, his on-base streak would've extended to 36 games at the time. However, 30 games on-base streak to begin a career was the 3rd longest streak in MLB history, following Alvin Davis' 47, and Truck Hannah's 38. On May 20, Schanuel, Zach Neto, Logan O'Hoppe and Jo Adell helped the Angels earn 9–7 win over the Astros at Minute Made Park, marking the first time that the Angels received 4 home runs in one game from players 25 years old or younger. It was also the first time in MLB history a club had home runs from a 25-year-old, a 24-year-old, a 23-year-old and a 22-year-old in the same game.

Schanuel slashed .250/.343/.362 with 13 home runs, 19 doubles and 54 RBIs in 147 games. In his first full season at the majors, his contact rate was high, but his bat speed, averaged 65.2 mph, was ranked as the fifth-slowest mark in the majors.

==== 2025 ====
On May 19, Schanuel went 3-for-4 with a home run and 2 doubles against the Athletics at Sutter Health Park. It was his first career game with three extra-base hits. On June 10, he hit his first walk-off hit in the 10th inning to lead the Angels to a 2–1 win against the Athletics at Angel Stadium. On August 24, he was placed on the 10-day injured list due to a left wrist contusion, and was activated on September 19.

== Player profile ==
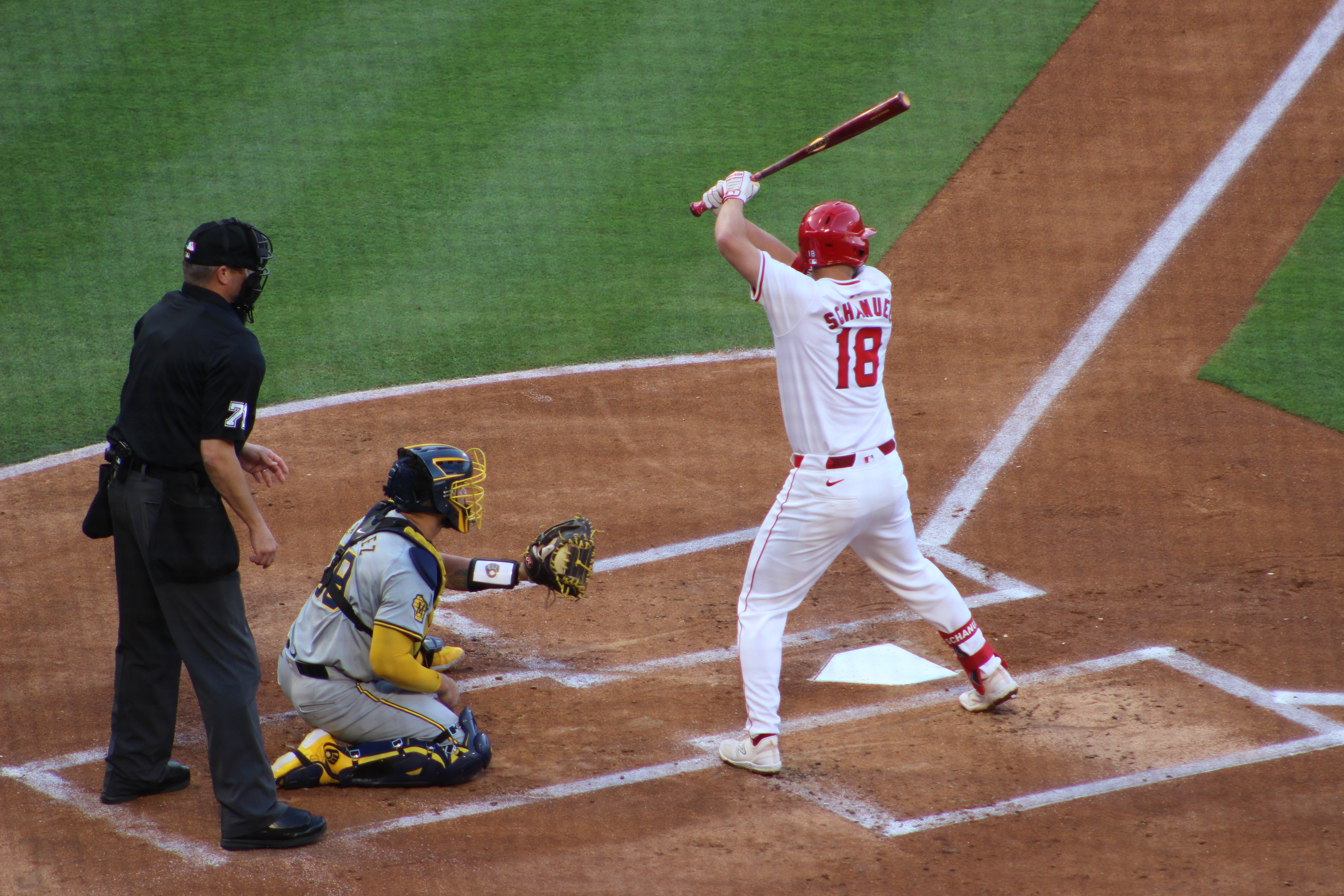
Schanuel at the plate, 2024

Schanuel is considered a contact hitter who tends to accrue singles at a higher rate than his peers. His batting stance is upright with his feet close to home plate, leading to a higher frequency of getting hit by pitches. Schanuel holds his hands high with his bat raised vertically above his head, garnering comparisons to Craig Counsell's bat position. Because of the high position of his hands, Schanuel tends to make contact with the ball at more of a downward angle, leading to more ground balls and fewer home runs.

On MLB.com's 20–80 scale draft report, Schanuel received a 60 grade for hitting, 50 for power, 45 for baserunning, 50 for arm strength, 50 for fielding, and 50 overall. The profile noted his plate discipline, citing his low strikeout rate and high walk rate in college. It also suggested a potential for him to play a corner outfield position.

== Personal life ==
Schanuel has 20/10 vision, considered twice the ability of the average person.
