= Daniel Cabrera (outfielder) =

American baseball player (born 1998)

- Outfielder
- Born: September 5, 1998 (age 28); Baton Rouge, Louisiana, U.S.
- Bats: Left Throws: Left

Daniel Reed Cabrera (born September 5, 1998) is an American former professional baseball outfielder. He played college baseball for the LSU Tigers and was selected by the Detroit Tigers with the 62nd overall pick in the 2020 MLB draft.

== Amateur career ==
Cabrera attended John Curtis Christian High School for his first three years of high school. He committed to play college baseball at Louisiana State University during his junior season in 2016. During his junior season, he batted .393 with three home runs while pitching to a 1.22 earned run average. He transferred to Parkview Baptist High School for his senior year in 2017, where he batted .510. Following the season, he was selected by the San Diego Padres in the 26th round of the 2017 Major League Baseball draft. However, he did not sign, and instead chose to honor his commitment to LSU.

As a freshman in 2018, Cabrera was immediately thrust into the starting lineup. Over 63 games (58 starts), he batted .315 with eight home runs and 54 runs batted in (RBIs), earning various All-American honors alongside a spot on the SEC All-Freshman Team. He spent that summer playing for the USA Baseball Collegiate National Team and also played for the Bourne Braves of the Cape Cod Baseball League (CCBL). In 2019, his sophomore season, he slashed .284/.359/.516 with 12 home runs and 50 RBIs. That summer, he returned to the CCBL to play for the Harwich Mariners, earning All-Star honors. Cabrera entered his junior year in 2020 as a top prospect for the 2020 Major League Baseball draft. He appeared in 17 games, batting .345 with two home runs, before the college baseball season was cut short due to the COVID-19 pandemic.

== Professional career ==
Cabrera was selected by the Detroit Tigers with the 62nd overall pick in the draft, and signed for $1.2 million. He did not play in a game in 2020 due to the cancellation of the minor league season because of the COVID-19 pandemic. To begin the 2021 season, Cabrera was assigned to the West Michigan Whitecaps of the High-A Central. After slashing .242/.300/.395 with nine home runs and 64 RBI over 99 games, he was promoted to the Erie SeaWolves of the Double-A Northeast in late August. Over 17 games with Erie, Cabrera batted .174 with four home runs and nine RBI.

Cabrera returned to Erie to begin the 2022 season, was reassigned to West Michigan in early June, and then returned to Erie once again in early July. Over 120 games between the two affiliates, he slashed .237/.309/.351 with eight home runs and 46 RBI. To open the 2023 season, Cabrera was assigned to Erie. He also played with the Lakeland Flying Tigers. Across 70 total appearances, Cabrera hit .239 with one home run and 27 RBI. Cabrera appeared in seven games for Erie in 2024 before being placed on the restricted list for the remainder of the season, and also did not appear in a game in 2025.
