= Clark Griffith Collegiate Baseball League =

Clark C. Griffith Collegiate Baseball League
- Sport: Baseball
- Founded: 1945
- No. of teams: 5
- Country: United States
- Most recent champion: Vienna Senators
- Website: Official website

The Clark C. Griffith Collegiate Baseball League (CGL) was a collegiate summer baseball league, with teams located in the Washington, D.C. metropolitan area. All league players had to be enrolled at a National Collegiate Athletic Association (NCAA) school, have at least one year of NCAA eligibility remaining and be amateurs by NCAA rules. The CGL was a charter member of the All-American Amateur Baseball Association and was designated a Premier League by the National Baseball Congress. The league had five teams in 2009 but suspended play for the 2010 season and does not appear to have been operational since.

== History ==
The Clark Griffith Collegiate Baseball League was founded in 1945 and was then known as the National Capital City Junior League. In the earliest years, games were played around Washington, D.C., including on The Ellipse behind the White House. Clark Griffith who then owned the Washington Senators (now Minnesota Twins) gave the league financial support. When he died in 1955, the league was renamed the Clark Griffith Memorial Baseball League. The name was changed to its final form in 1995.

In 1966 the league began playing all its game on the baseball field at George Mason University. That continued until 1987 when teams began playing on their own home fields.

The league instituted a rule requiring the use of only wooden bats in competition in 1993.

More than 50 CGL alumni went on to play Major League Baseball and over 250 went on to play Minor League Baseball.

== Noted alumni ==
See:

- Jonathon Papelbon
- Cla Meredith
- Mark Teixeira
- Joe Saunders
- Will Rhymes
- Manny Burriss
- Jared Burton
- Shawn Camp
- John Maine
- Charlton Jimerson
- Dirk Hayhurst
- Michael McKenry
- Tony Dokoupil
