= Gaithersburg Giants =

Collegiate baseball league team

Information
- League: Cal Ripken Collegiate Baseball League
- Location: Gaithersburg, Maryland
- Ballpark: Criswell Automotive Field
- Founded: 2013
- Website: gaithersburggiants.org

The Gaithersburg Giants are a baseball team in the Cal Ripken Collegiate Baseball League. They play in Gaithersburg, Maryland at Criswell Automotive Field. They joined the league in 2013.

== Notable players ==
- Jordan Westburg, Infielder for the Baltimore Orioles; 2024 American League All-Star with Baltimore.
- Luke Keaschall Made his MLB debut with the Minnesota Twins after being selected in the second round of the 2023 draft.
- Eric Brodkowitz, Israeli-American baseball pitcher for the Israel National Baseball Team
