= 2001 Southeastern Conference baseball tournament =

- Teams: 8
- Format: Two pools of four-team double elimination
- Finals site: Hoover Metropolitan Stadium; Hoover, Alabama
- Champions: Mississippi State (5th title)
- Winning coach: Pat McMahon (1st title)
- MVP: Chris Young (Mississippi State)
- Attendance: 85,771

2001 Southeastern Conference baseball standings
	Conf.				Overall
Team	W		L	PCT	W		L	PCT
Eastern
No. 8 Georgia ^{x}‍†‍‍^{y}	20	–	10	.667	45	–	19	.703
No. 4 Tennessee ‍‍‍^{y}	18	–	12	.600	48	–	20	.706
No. 15 South Carolina ‍‍‍^{y}	17	–	13	.567	48	–	18	.727
Florida ‍‍‍^{y}	16	–	14	.533	35	–	27	.565
Vanderbilt ‍‍‍	9	–	21	.300	23	–	31	.426
Kentucky ‍‍‍	7	–	23	.233	22	–	34	.393
Western
No. 10 LSU ^{x}‍‍‍^{y}	18	–	12	.600	44	–	22	.667
#14 Mississippi State‡^{y} ‍‍‍	17	–	13	.567	39	–	22	.639
Ole Miss ‍‍‍^{y}	17	–	13	.567	39	–	23	.629
No. 30 Auburn ‍‍‍^{y}	15	–	15	.500	32	–	23	.582
Alabama ‍‍‍	15	–	15	.500	32	–	23	.582
Arkansas ‍‍‍	11	–	19	.367	27	–	29	.482
x – Division champion † – Conference champion ‡ – Tournament champion y – Invited to the NCAA tournament As of June 30, 2001; Rankings from Collegiate Baseball

The 2001 Southeastern Conference baseball tournament was held at Hoover Metropolitan Stadium in Hoover, Alabama from May 16 through 20. Mississippi State defeated LSU in the championship game, earning the Southeastern Conference's automatic bid to the 2001 NCAA Division I baseball tournament.

== Regular-season results ==
The top two teams (based on conference results) from both the Eastern and Western Divisions earned automatic invites to the tournament. The next four teams with the best conference winning percentages, regardless of division, qualified for the tournament at-large.

Eastern Division
Team	W	L	Pct	GB	Seed
Georgia	20	10	.667	–	1
Tennessee	18	12	.600	2	3
South Carolina	17	13	.567	3	5
Florida	16	14	.533	4	7
Vanderbilt	9	21	.300	11	—
Kentucky	7	23	.233	13	—

Western Division
Team	W	L	Pct	GB	Seed
LSU	18	12	.600	—	2
Mississippi State	17	13	.567	1	4
Ole Miss	17	13	.567	1	6
Auburn	15	15	.500	3	8
Alabama	15	15	.500	3	—
Arkansas	11	19	.367	7	—

== Tournament ==
First round
6	Ole Miss	17
3	Tennessee	6
7	Florida	0
2	LSU	10
3	Tennessee	3
7	Florida	9
5	South Carolina	1
4	Mississippi State	2
8	Auburn	4
1	Georgia	8
8	Auburn	4
5	South Carolina	5

Second round
2	LSU	13
6	Ole Miss	2
7	Florida	6
6	Ole Miss	7
4	Mississippi State	8
1	Georgia	4
1	Georgia	2
5	South Carolina	10

Semifinals
6	Ole Miss	6	-
2	LSU	12	-
5	South Carolina	7	0
4	Mississippi State	6	1

Final
2	LSU	1
4	Mississippi State	4

- Kentucky, Alabama, Vanderbilt and Arkansas did not make the tournament.

== All-Tournament Team ==
Most Valuable Player Chris Young, Mississippi State

Position	Player	School
1B	Josh Christian	Ole Miss
2B	Bryon Jeffcoat	South Carolina
3B	Lance Jones	Ole Miss
SS	Chris Burke	Tennessee
C	Matt Heath	LSU
OF	Michael Floyd	South Carolina
OF	Todd Linden	LSU
OF	John West	Mississippi State
DH	Jon Knott	Mississippi State
P	Chris Young	Mississippi State
P	Brandon Medders	Mississippi State
MVP	Chris Young	Mississippi State

== See also ==
- College World Series
- NCAA Division I Baseball Championship
- Southeastern Conference baseball tournament
