= 2001 Miami Hurricanes baseball team =

American college baseball season

2001 Miami Hurricanes baseball

National champions
- Conference: Independent

Ranking
- Coaches: No. 1
- CB: No. 1
- Record: 53–12
- Head coach: Jim Morris (8th year)
- Assistant coaches: Lazaro Collazo (6th year); Gino DiMare (5th year); Mark Kingston (2nd year)
- Home stadium: Mark Light Field

2001 NCAA Division I baseball independents standings
	Conf.				Overall
Team	W		L	PCT	W		L	PCT
No. 1 Miami (FL) ‍‍‍^{y}		–		–	47	–	12	.797
Belmont ‍‍‍		–		–	28	–	24	.538
Centenary ‍‍‍		–		–	23	–	36	.390
Texas A&M–Corpus Christi ‍‍‍		–		–	18	–	36	.333
Texas–Pan American ‍‍‍		–		–	12	–	40	.231
y – Invited to the NCAA tournament As of June 30, 2001; Rankings from Collegiate Baseball

The 2001 Miami Hurricanes baseball team represented the University of Miami in the 2001 NCAA Division I baseball season. The team was coached by Jim Morris in his 8th season.

The Hurricanes won the College World Series, defeating the Stanford Cardinal in the championship game.

== Roster ==
2001 Miami Hurricanes roster
Pitchers: Kiki Bengochea; J. D. Cockroft; Andrew Cohn; Luke DeBold; Tom Farmer; George Huguet; Alex Prendes; T.J. Prunty; Troy Roberson; Chris Sheffield; Dan Smith; Dan Touchet; Vince Vazquez; Brian Walker	Infielders: Kevin Brown; Eric Moore; Kris Clute; Matt Dryer; Kevin Howard; Javy Rodriguez; Catchers: Mike DiRosa; Greg Lovelady; Danny Matienzo	Outfielders: Jim Burt, Jr.; Charlton Jimerson; Marcus Nettles; Kevin Mannix; Mike Rodriguez; Brad Safchik

== Schedule ==
2001 Miami Hurricanes baseball game log (53–12)
Regular season (44–12)
January/February (12–3)

Date	Opponent	Rank	Site/stadium	Score	Overall record
January 25	Florida Atlantic	No. 9	Mark Light Field	W 9–3	1–0
January 26	Florida Atlantic	No. 9	FAU Baseball Stadium	L 10–11	1–1
January 27	Florida Atlantic	No. 9	Mark Light Field	W 4–2	2–1
February 3	at No. 13 Florida	No. 9	McKethan Stadium	W 14–5	3–1
February 7	at Florida International	No. 9	University Park Stadium	W 4–3	4–1
February 9	No. 17 Florida	No. 9	Mark Light Field	W 10–4	5–1
February 10	No. 17 Florida	No. 9	Mark Light Field	W 8–7	6–1
February 11	No. 19 Oklahoma State	No. 9	Mark Light Field	L 3–9	6–2
February 16	Elon	No. 8	Mark Light Field	W 4–2	7–2
February 17	Elon	No. 8	Mark Light Field	W 10–9	8–2
February 18	Elon	No. 8	Mark Light Field	W 7–4	9–2
February 21	Florida International	No. 8	Mark Light Field	L 10–17	9–3
February 23	vs. Florida International	No. 8	Homestead Sports Complex	W 10–2	10–3
February 24	vs. Florida International	No. 8	Homestead Sports Complex	W 2–0	11–3
February 25	Albany	No. 8	Mark Light Field	W 14–0	12–3

March (13–5)

Date	Opponent	Rank	Site/stadium	Score	Overall record
March 2	San Diego State	No. 8	Hubert H. Humphrey Metrodome	W 8–6	13–3
March 3	Minnesota	No. 8	Hubert H. Humphrey Metrodome	W 10–1	14–3
March 4	No. 21 Arkansas	No. 8	Hubert H. Humphrey Metrodome	W 8–2	15–3
March 7	Pittsburgh	No. 7	Mark Light Field	W 6–2	16–3
March 9	No. 30 Rutgers	No. 7	Mark Light Field	L 4–6	16–4
March 10	No. 30 Rutgers	No. 7	Mark Light Field	W 13–2	17–4
March 11	No. 30 Rutgers	No. 7	Mark Light Field	L 6–9	17–5
March 13	at South Florida	No. 9	Red McEwen Field	W 8–2	18–5
March 14	at South Florida	No. 9	Red McEwen Field	W 13–9	19–5
March 16	No. 19 East Carolina	No. 9	Mark Light Field	W 14–13	20–5
March 17	No. 19 East Carolina	No. 9	Mark Light Field	L 2–7	20–6
March 18	No. 19 East Carolina	No. 9	Mark Light Field	W 8–4	21–6
March 21	Cornell	No. 6	Mark Light Field	W 2–1	22–6
March 23	Northeastern	No. 6	Mark Light Field	W 5–3	23–6
March 24	Northeastern	No. 6	Mark Light Field	W 5–2	24–6
March 25	Northeastern	No. 6	Mark Light Field	W 5–3	25–6
March 30	No. 29 Cal State Fullerton	No. 5	Mark Light Field	L 2–8	25–7
March 31	No. 29 Cal State Fullerton	No. 5	Mark Light Field	L 5–8	25–8

April (8–3)

Date	Opponent	Rank	Site/stadium	Score	Overall record
April 1	No. 29 Cal State Fullerton	No. 5	Mark Light Field	L 2–9	25–9
April 6	Savannah State	No. 16	Mark Light Field	W 13–4	26–9
April 7	Savannah State	No. 16	Mark Light Field	W 7–2	27–9
April 8	Savannah State	No. 16	Mark Light Field	W 16–5	28–9
April 13	No. 3 Florida State	No. 11	Mark Light Field	L 9–10	28–10
April 14	No. 3 Florida State	No. 11	Mark Light Field	W 5–4	29–10
April 15	No. 3 Florida State	No. 11	Mark Light Field	W 7–5	30–10
April 20	at No. 9 Florida State	No. 7	Mike Martin Field at Dick Howser Stadium	W 7–5	31–10
April 21	at No. 9 Florida State	No. 7	Mike Martin Field at Dick Howser Stadium	W 9–6	32–10
April 22	at No. 9 Florida State	No. 7	Mike Martin Field at Dick Howser Stadium	W 7–4	33–10
April 27	Virginia	No. 7	Mark Light Field	L 0–5	34–11
April 28	Virginia	No. 7	Mark Light Field	W 5–1	35–11
April 29	Virginia	No. 5	Mark Light Field	W 12–6	36–11

May (8–1)

Date	Opponent	Rank	Site/stadium	Score	Overall record
May 4	Jacksonville	No. 5	Mark Light Field	L 2–3	36–12
May 5	Jacksonville	No. 5	Mark Light Field	W 13–3	37–12
May 6	Jacksonville	No. 5	Mark Light Field	W 6–2	38–12
May 11	Florida Southern	No. 4	Mark Light Field	W 12–4	39–12
May 12	Florida Southern	No. 4	Mark Light Field	W 16–3	40–12
May 13	Florida Southern	No. 4	Mark Light Field	W 5–4	41–12
May 18	New York Tech	No. 2	Mark Light Field	W 17–5	42–12
May 19	New York Tech	No. 2	Mark Light Field	W 14–7	43–12
May 20	New York Tech	No. 2	Mark Light Field	W 11–1	44–12

Postseason (9–0)
NCAA tournament: Coral Gables Regional (3–0)

Date	Opponent	Seed/Rank	Site/stadium	Score	Overall record
May 25	vs. (4) Bucknell	(1) No. 1	Mark Light Field	W 14–6	45–12
May 26	vs. (2) Florida	(1) No. 1	Mark Light Field	W 6–2	46–12
May 27	vs. (3) Stetson	(1) No. 1	Mark Light Field	W 16–8	47–12

NCAA tournament: Coral Gables Super Regional (2–0)

Date	Opponent	Seed/Rank	Site/stadium	Score	Overall record
June 1	vs. No. 12 Clemson	(2) No. 1	Mark Light Field	W 10–8	48–12
June 2	vs. No. 12 Clemson	(2) No. 1	Mark Light Field	W 14–6	49–12

NCAA tournament: College World Series (4–0)

Date	Opponent	Seed/Rank	Site/stadium	Score	Overall record
June 9	vs. No. 8 Tennessee	(2) No. 1	Rosenblatt Stadium	W 21–13	50–12
June 11	vs. (3) No. 2 Southern California	(2) No. 1	Rosenblatt Stadium	W 4–3	51–12
June 14	vs. No. 8 Tennessee	(2) No. 1	Rosenblatt Stadium	W 12–6	52–12
June 16	vs. (4) No. 4 Stanford	(2) No. 1	Rosenblatt Stadium	W 12–1	53–12

== Awards and honors ==
Javy Rodriguez

- Team Most Valuable Player
- All-American
- NCAA Stolen Base Leader

Kevin Brown

- College World Series All-Tournament Team

Tom Farmer

- College World Series All-Tournament Team

George Huguet

- Freshman All-America

Charlton Jimerson

- College World Series Most Outstanding Player

Danny Matienzo

- College World Series All-Tournament Team

== Hurricanes in the 2001 MLB draft ==
The following members of the Miami baseball program were drafted in the 2001 Major League Baseball draft.

Player	Position	Round	Overall	MLB Team
Mike Rodriguez	OF	2nd	54th	Houston Astros
Chris Sheffield	RHP	4th	121st	Toronto Blue Jays
Brian Walker	LHP	4th	132nd	New York Mets
Charlton Jimerson	OF	5th	146th	Houston Astros
Tom Farmer	RHP	7th	207th	Detroit Tigers
Marcus Nettles	OF	11th	330th	San Diego Padres
Mike DiRosa	C	16th	488th	Arizona Diamondbacks
Dan Smith	RHP	17th	507th	Detroit Tigers
Kevin Brown	1B	19th	585th	Atlanta Braves
Troy Roberson	RHP	28th	831st	Texas Rangers
Kris Clute	2B	37th	1112th	Florida Marlins
