= 2001 Cal State Fullerton Titans baseball team =

American college baseball season

2001 Cal State Fullerton Titans baseball

NCAA Fullerton Super Regional champions NCAA Fullerton Regional champions Big West Conference champions

College World Series, 2–2
- Conference: Big West Conference
- Record: 48–18 (14–4 Big West)
- Head coach: George Horton (5th year)
- Home stadium: Goodwin Field

2001 Big West Conference baseball standings
| | Conf. | | | | Overall |
| Team | W | | L | PCT | W | | L | PCT |
|---|---|---|---|---|---|---|---|---|
| No. 3 Cal State Fullerton ‍†‍‍^{y} | 14 | – | 4 | .778 | 48 | – | 18 | .727 |
| No. 26 UC Santa Barbara ‍‍‍^{y} | 12 | – | 6 | .667 | 40 | – | 17 | .702 |
| Long Beach State ‍‍‍^{y} | 11 | – | 7 | .611 | 35 | – | 23 | .603 |
| Cal State Northridge ‍‍‍ | 9 | – | 9 | .500 | 24 | – | 22 | .522 |
| Cal Poly ‍‍‍ | 8 | – | 10 | .444 | 30 | – | 26 | .536 |
| Pacific ‍‍‍ | 5 | – | 13 | .278 | 25 | – | 30 | .455 |
| Sacramento State ‍‍‍ | 4 | – | 14 | .222 | 24 | – | 35 | .407 |
† – Conference champion y – Invited to the NCAA tournament As of June 30, 2001; Rankings from Collegiate Baseball

The 2001 Cal State Fullerton Titans baseball team represented California State University, Fullerton in the 2001 NCAA Division I baseball season. The Titans played their home games at Goodwin Field, and played as part of the Big West Conference. The team was coached by George Horton in his fifth season as head coach at Cal State Fullerton.

The Titans reached the College World Series, their eleventh appearance in Omaha, where they finished tied for fourth place after winning games against Nebraska and Tulane and losing two games to eventual runner-up Stanford.

== Personnel ==
=== Roster ===
2001 Cal State Fullerton Titans roster
| Pitchers: 2 - Kirk Saarloos - Senior; 9 - Mike Nunez - Senior; 17 - Wes Littleton - Freshman; 19 - Charlie Zahari - Junior; 25 - Darric Merrell - Freshman; 30 - Shane Waroff - Junior; 31 - Nick Lovato - Sophomore; 32 - Chad Cordero - Freshman; 34 - Jon Smith - Senior; 35 - Chad Robbins - Freshman; 39 - Travis Esquibel - Freshman; 42 - Travis Ingle - Freshman; 48 - Sean Martin - Sophomore | Catchers: 15 - Lachlan Thorburn - Junior; 20 - Dan Mercadefe - Freshman; 24 - Brett Kay - Junior; 44 - P. J. Pilittere - Freshman; Outfielders: 5 - Matt Belfanti - Senior; 6 - Chris Stringfellow - Junior; 22 - Kyle Boyer - Freshman; 26 - Robert Guzman - Junior; 33 - Shane Costa - Freshman; 40 - Josh Weller - Senior; 47 - Adam Cooper - Freshman | Infielders: 1 - David Bacani - Senior; 3 - Shawn Norris - Junior; 4 - Jason Corapci - Sophomore; 7 - Mike Rouse - Sophomore; 10 - Cole Hilt - Freshman; 11 - David Garcia - Freshman; 12 - Mike Martinez - Sophomore; 21 - Nick Fitzgerald - Freshman; 27 - Louie Lamoure - Senior; 41 - Sean Alley - Junior; 45 - Aaron Rifkin - Senior; 46 - Richie Burgos - Freshman |

=== Coaches ===
2001 Cal State Fullerton Titans baseball coaching staff
- 8 - George Horton - Head coach - 5th Season
- 18 - Dave Serrano - Assistant coach/Recruiting coordinator - 5th Season
- 28 - Rick Vanderhook - Assistant coach - 15th Season
- 36 - Chad Baum - Assistant coach - 2nd Season

== Schedule and results ==
Legend
| Cal State Fullerton win |
| Cal State Fullerton loss |

2001 Cal State Fullerton Titans baseball game log
Regular season

January/February
| Date | Opponent | Rank | Site/Stadium | Score | Overall Record | Big West Record |
|---|---|---|---|---|---|---|
| Jan 30 | at Pepperdine* | No. 12 | Eddy D. Field Stadium • Malibu, CA | L 2–5 | 0–1 | |
| Feb 2 | No. 11 Stanford* | No. 12 | Goodwin Field • Fullerton, CA | W 5–4 | 1–1 | |
| Feb 3 | No. 11 Stanford* | No. 12 | Goodwin Field • Fullerton, CA | L 8–9 | 1–2 | |
| Feb 4 | No. 11 Stanford* | No. 12 | Goodwin Field • Fullerton, CA | L 0–3 | 1–3 | |
| Feb 6 | at No. 2 USC* | No. 15 | Dedeaux Field • Los Angeles, CA | L 5–6^{13} | 1–4 | |
| Feb 9 | at No. 18 Baylor* | No. 15 | Baylor Ballpark • Waco, TX | W 2–1 | 2–4 | |
| Feb 10 | at No. 18 Baylor* | No. 15 | Baylor Ballpark • Waco, TX | L 0–5 | 2–5 | |
| Feb 11 | at No. 18 Baylor* | No. 15 | Baylor Ballpark • Waco, TX | W 5–0 | 3–5 | |
| Feb 14 | Loyola Marymount* | No. 17 | Goodwin Field • Fullerton, CA | W 5–3 | 4–5 | |
| Feb 15 | BYU* | No. 17 | Goodwin Field • Fullerton, CA | W 2–1 | 5–5 | |
| Feb 16 | BYU* | No. 17 | Goodwin Field • Fullerton, CA | L 2–8 | 5–6 | |
| Feb 17 | BYU* | No. 17 | Goodwin Field • Fullerton, CA | W 5–0 | 6–6 | |
| Feb 23 | No. 6 Arizona State* | No. 17 | Goodwin Field • Fullerton, CA | L 3–5 | 6–7 | |

March
| Date | Opponent | Rank | Site/Stadium | Score | Overall Record | Big West Record |
|---|---|---|---|---|---|---|
| Mar 2 | No. 22 Tennessee* | No. 28 | Goodwin Field • Fullerton, CA (Kia Baseball Bash) | W 10–6 | 7–7 | |
| Mar 3 | Wichita State* | No. 28 | Goodwin Field • Fullerton, CA (Kia Baseball Bash) | W 3–1 | 8–7 | |
| Mar 4 | No. 26 Long Beach State* | No. 28 | Goodwin Field • Fullerton, CA (Kia Baseball Bash) | L 11–13 | 8–8 | |
| Mar 9 | at Houston* | | Schroeder Park • Houston, TX | W 5–2 | 9–8 | |
| Mar 10 | at Houston* | | Schroeder Park • Houston, TX | W 8–2 | 10–8 | |
| Mar 11 | at Houston* | | Schroeder Park • Houston, TX | W 9–2^{8} | 11–8 | |
| Mar 16 | Cal Poly* | No. 28 | Goodwin Field • Fullerton, CA | W 3–1 | 12–8 | |
| Mar 17 | Cal Poly* | No. 28 | Goodwin Field • Fullerton, CA | L 1–2 | 12–9 | |
| Mar 18 | Cal Poly* | No. 28 | Goodwin Field • Fullerton, CA | W 12–0 | 13–9 | |
| Mar 23 | at Long Beach State* | No. 29 | Blair Field • Long Beach, CA | W 5–3 | 14–9 | |
| Mar 24 | at Long Beach State* | No. 29 | Blair Field • Long Beach, CA | L 2–3^{16} | 14–10 | |
| Mar 25 | at Long Beach State* | No. 29 | Blair Field • Long Beach, CA | W 5–3 | 15–10 | |
| Mar 27 | No. 12 USC* | No. 29 | Goodwin Field • Fullerton, CA | W 12–11 | 16–10 | |
| Mar 30 | at No. 5 Miami (FL)* | No. 29 | Mark Light Field • Miami, FL | W 8–2 | 17–10 | |
| Mar 31 | at No. 5 Miami (FL)* | No. 29 | Mark Light Field • Miami, FL | W 8–5 | 18–10 | |

April
| Date | Opponent | Rank | Site/Stadium | Score | Overall Record | Big West Record |
|---|---|---|---|---|---|---|
| Apr 1 | at No. 5 Miami (FL)* | No. 29 | Mark Light Field • Miami, FL | W 9–2 | 19–10 | |
| Apr 6 | Pacific | No. 14 | Goodwin Field • Fullerton, CA | W 6–1 | 20–10 | 1–0 |
| Apr 7 | Pacific | No. 14 | Goodwin Field • Fullerton, CA | W 3–1 | 21–10 | 2–0 |
| Apr 8 | Pacific | No. 14 | Goodwin Field • Fullerton, CA | W 28–0 | 22–10 | 3–0 |
| Apr 9 | No. 16 Arizona State* | No. 9 | Goodwin Field • Fullerton, CA | W 13–6 | 23–10 | |
| Apr 12 | at Sacramento State | No. 9 | Hornet Field • Sacramento, CA | W 20–2 | 24–10 | 4–0 |
| Apr 13 | at Sacramento State | No. 9 | Hornet Field • Sacramento, CA | W 9–5 | 25–10 | 5–0 |
| Apr 14 | at Sacramento State | No. 9 | Hornet Field • Sacramento, CA | W 8–2 | 26–10 | 6–0 |
| Apr 17 | at Loyola Marymount* | No. 6 | George C. Page Stadium • Los Angeles, CA | W 9–5 | 27–10 | |
| Apr 18 | UCLA* | No. 6 | Goodwin Field • Fullerton, CA | W 11–10^{14} | 28–10 | |
| Apr 20 | at Cal State Northridge | No. 6 | Matador Field • Northridge, CA | L 1–15 | 28–11 | 6–1 |
| Apr 21 | at Cal State Northridge | No. 6 | Matador Field • Northridge, CA | W 4–3 | 29–11 | 7–1 |
| Apr 22 | at Cal State Northridge | No. 6 | Matador Field • Northridge, CA | W 5–2 | 30–11 | 8–1 |
| Apr 27 | UC Riverside | No. 5 | Goodwin Field • Fullerton, CA | W 8–4 | 31–11 | |
| Apr 28 | UC Riverside | No. 5 | Goodwin Field • Fullerton, CA | W 4–1 | 32–11 | |
| Apr 29 | UC Riverside | No. 5 | Goodwin Field • Fullerton, CA | W 15–2 | 33–11 | |

May
| Date | Opponent | Rank | Site/Stadium | Score | Overall Record | Big West Record |
|---|---|---|---|---|---|---|
| May 1 | No. 17 Pepperdine* | No. 3 | Goodwin Field • Fullerton, CA | W 14–7 | 34–11 | |
| May 2 | Biola* | No. 3 | Goodwin Field • Fullerton, CA | W 7–6 | 35–11 | |
| May 4 | at Cal Poly | No. 3 | Robin Baggett Stadium • San Luis Obispo, CA | W 7–3 | 36–11 | 9–1 |
| May 5 | at Cal Poly | No. 3 | Robin Baggett Stadium • San Luis Obispo, CA | W 13–1 | 37–11 | 10–1 |
| May 6 | at Cal Poly | No. 3 | Robin Baggett Stadium • San Luis Obispo, CA | W 10–4 | 38–11 | 11–1 |
| May 9 | at UCLA* | No. 1 | Jackie Robinson Stadium • Los Angeles, CA | L 3–9 | 38–12 | |
| May 11 | No. 23 UC Santa Barbara | No. 1 | Goodwin Field • Fullerton, CA | L 1–9 | 38–13 | 11–2 |
| May 12 | No. 23 UC Santa Barbara | No. 1 | Goodwin Field • Fullerton, CA | L 6–7^{10} | 38–14 | 11–3 |
| May 13 | No. 23 UC Santa Barbara | No. 1 | Goodwin Field • Fullerton, CA | W 6–4 | 39–14 | 12–3 |
| May 18 | Long Beach State | No. 5 | Goodwin Field • Fullerton, CA | W 16–6 | 40–14 | 13–3 |
| May 19 | Long Beach State | No. 5 | Goodwin Field • Fullerton, CA | L 6–17 | 40–15 | 13–4 |
| May 20 | Long Beach State | No. 5 | Goodwin Field • Fullerton, CA | W 10–5 | 41–15 | 14–4 |

Postseason

NCAA Fullerton Regional
| Date | Opponent | Rank/Seed | Site/Stadium | Score | Overall Record | Reg Record |
|---|---|---|---|---|---|---|
| May 25 | (4) Temple | No. 5 (1) | Goodwin Field • Fullerton, CA | W 17–3 | 42–15 | 1–0 |
| May 26 | No. 16 (2) Arizona State | No. 5 (1) | Goodwin Field • Fullerton, CA | W 13–3 | 43–15 | 2–0 |
| May 27 | No. 22 (3) Texas Tech | No. 5 (1) | Goodwin Field • Fullerton, CA | L 5–11 | 43–16 | 2–1 |
| May 27 | No. 22 (3) Texas Tech | No. 5 (1) | Goodwin Field • Fullerton, CA | W 9–2 | 44–16 | 3–1 |

NCAA Fullerton Super Regional
| Date | Opponent | Rank/Seed | Site/Stadium | Score | Overall Record | SR Record |
|---|---|---|---|---|---|---|
| June 1 | No. 14 Mississippi State | No. 5 (1) | Goodwin Field • Fullerton, CA | W 13–2 | 45–16 | 1–0 |
| June 2 | No. 14 Mississippi State | No. 5 (1) | Goodwin Field • Fullerton, CA | W 9–3 | 46–16 | 2–0 |

College World Series
| Date | Opponent | Rank/Seed | Site/Stadium | Score | Overall Record | CWS Record |
|---|---|---|---|---|---|---|
| June 8 | No. 3 (8) Nebraska | No. 5 (1) | Johnny Rosenblatt Stadium • Omaha, NE | W 5–4 | 47–16 | 1–0 |
| June 10 | No. 4 (4) Stanford | No. 5 (1) | Johnny Rosenblatt Stadium • Omaha, NE | L 2–5^{10} | 47–17 | 1–1 |
| June 14 | No. 6 (5) Tulane | No. 5 (1) | Johnny Rosenblatt Stadium • Omaha, NE | W 11–2 | 48–17 | 2–1 |
| June 16 | No. 4 (4) Stanford | No. 5 (1) | Johnny Rosenblatt Stadium • Omaha, NE | L 1–4 | 48–18 | 2–2 |

== Rankings ==
Ranking movements Legend: ██ Increase in ranking ██ Decrease in ranking — = Not ranked
| | Week | | | | | | | | | | | | | | | | | | | | |
| Poll | Pre | 1 | 2 | 3 | 4 | 5 | 6 | 7 | 8 | 9 | 10 | 11 | 12 | 13 | 14 | 15 | 16 | 17 | 18 | 19 | Final |
|---|---|---|---|---|---|---|---|---|---|---|---|---|---|---|---|---|---|---|---|---|---|
| Coaches' | | * | | | | | | | | | | | | | | | | | | | 3 |
| Baseball America | | | | | | | | | | | | | | | | | | | | | 3 |
| Collegiate Baseball^ | 12 | 15 | 17 | 17 | 28 | — | 28 | 29 | 29 | 14 | 9 | 6 | 5 | 3 | 1 | 6 | 5 | 5 | 5 | 5 | 3 |
| NCBWA† | | | | | | | | | | | | | | | | | | | | | 3 |

^ Collegiate Baseball ranked 40 teams in their preseason poll, but only ranked 30 teams weekly during the season.
† NCBWA ranks 30 teams in their preseason poll, but only ranks 25 teams weekly during the season.
* A new poll was not released for this week, so for comparison purposes, the previous week's ranking is inserted in this week's slot.
