= 2001 USC Trojans baseball team =

American college baseball season

2001 USC Trojans baseball

Pacific-10 Champions Los Angeles Regional champions Los Angeles Super Regional champions

College World Series, T-5th
- Conference: Pacific-10

Ranking
- Coaches: No. 4
- CB: No. 5
- Record: 45–19 (18–6 Pac-10)
- Head coach: Mike Gillespie (15th season)
- Assistant coach: Rob Klein (14th season)
- Hitting coach: Andy Nieto (5th season)
- Pitching coach: John Savage (6th season)
- Home stadium: Dedeaux Field

2001 Pacific-10 Conference baseball standings
	Conf.						Overall
Team	W		L		T	PCT	W		L		T	PCT
No. 5 Southern California ‍†‍‍	18	–	6	–	0	.750	45	–	19	–	0	.703
No. 2 Stanford ‍‍‍^{y}	17	–	7	–	0	.708	51	–	17	–	0	.750
No. 23 Arizona State ‍‍‍^{y}	14	–	10	–	0	.583	37	–	20	–	1	.647
California ‍‍‍^{y}	14	–	10	–	0	.583	34	–	25	–	0	.576
Arizona ‍‍‍	12	–	12	–	0	.500	33	–	23	–	0	.589
Oregon State ‍‍‍	11	–	13	–	0	.458	31	–	24	–	0	.564
UCLA ‍‍‍	9	–	15	–	0	.375	30	–	27	–	0	.526
Washington ‍‍‍	7	–	17	–	0	.292	29	–	23	–	0	.558
Washington State ‍‍‍	6	–	18	–	0	.250	15	–	39	–	0	.278
† – Conference champion y – Invited to the NCAA tournament As of June 30, 2001; Rankings from Collegiate Baseball

The 2001 USC Trojans baseball team represented the University of Southern California collegiate sports in the 2001 NCAA Division I baseball season. The Trojans played their home games at Dedeaux Field. The team was coached by Mike Gillespie in his 15th year at USC.

The Trojans won the Los Angeles Regional and the Los Angeles Super Regional to advance to the College World Series, where they were defeated by the Tennessee Volunteers.

== Roster ==
2001 USC Trojans baseball team
Players
Coaches

#	Pos.	Name	B/T	Height	Weight	Year	Home town
2	INF	Seth Davidson	S/R	6 ft 0 in (1.83 m)	165 lb (75 kg)	Sr	San Diego, California
3	RHP	Brian Bannister	R/R	6 ft 0 in (1.83 m)	180 lb (82 kg)	So	Paradise Valley, Arizona
4	INF	Michael Moon	L/R	5 ft 10 in (1.78 m)	175 lb (79 kg)	Fr	Alta Loma, California
6	OF	Brian Barre	L/L	5 ft 8 in (1.73 m)	170 lb (77 kg)	Jr	Garden Grove, California
7	C	Jeff Adolph	R/R	6 ft 0 in (1.83 m)	190 lb (86 kg)	RS So	Fresno, California
8	RHP	Rik Currier	R/R	5 ft 10 in (1.78 m)	185 lb (84 kg)	Sr	Dana Point, California
9	LHP	Fraser Dizard	L/L	6 ft 0 in (1.83 m)	180 lb (82 kg)	Fr	Edmonds, Washington
10		Josh Self	R/R	6 ft 4 in (1.93 m)	190 lb (86 kg)	RS Sr	Hughson, California
12	C	Matt Bonovich	R/R	6 ft 0 in (1.83 m)	190 lb (86 kg)	Jr	Sacramento, California
13	C	Alberto Concepcion	R/R	6 ft 0 in (1.83 m)	210 lb (95 kg)	So	El Segundo, California
14	INF	Colby Self	R/R	6 ft 1 in (1.85 m)	165 lb (75 kg)	So	Hughson, California
15	OF	Rob Garibaldi	L/L	5 ft 11 in (1.8 m)	175 lb (79 kg)	RS Jr	Petaluma, California
16		Tony Esquibel	R/R	6 ft 3 in (1.91 m)	210 lb (95 kg)	Fr	Alta Loma, California
18	LHP	Mark Todd	L/L	5 ft 11 in (1.8 m)	170 lb (77 kg)	Jr	San Diego, California
20	RHP	Sam Ramirez	R/R	6 ft 0 in (1.83 m)	175 lb (79 kg)	RS Fr	Monterey Park, California
21	RHP	Mark Prior	R/R	6 ft 5 in (1.96 m)	220 lb (100 kg)	Jr	Salinas, California
22		Josh Persell	S/R	6 ft 3 in (1.91 m)	200 lb (91 kg)	RS Sr	Sherman Oaks, California
23	RHP	Anthony Reyes	R/R	6 ft 1 in (1.85 m)	200 lb (91 kg)	So	Whittier, California
24	INF	Anthony Lunetta	R/R	5 ft 9 in (1.75 m)	170 lb (77 kg)	So	Riverside, California
25	RHP	Chad Clark	L/R	6 ft 6 in (1.98 m)	210 lb (95 kg)	So	Glendora, California
26	LHP	Jordan Olson	L/L	6 ft 2 in (1.88 m)	165 lb (75 kg)	So	La Crescenta, California
28	LHP	Josh Rummonds	L/L	6 ft 1 in (1.85 m)	185 lb (84 kg)	Fr	La Selva Beach, California
17	C	Ricky Helland	S/R	6 ft 2 in (1.88 m)	215 lb (98 kg)	RS Jr	Ventura, California
30	OF	Paki Lum	R/R	6 ft 1 in (1.85 m)	215 lb (98 kg)	So	Aiea, Hawaii
32	RHP	Jon Williams	R/R	6 ft 3 in (1.91 m)	190 lb (86 kg)	Fr	Alamo, California
34		Al Benavente	L/L	5 ft 8 in (1.73 m)	180 lb (82 kg)	Fr	Pico Rivera, California
35	INF	Rafael Torres	R/R	5 ft 9 in (1.75 m)	170 lb (77 kg)	Fr	Corona, California
37	INF	Nick Priest	R/R	6 ft 0 in (1.83 m)	200 lb (91 kg)	So	El Cajon, California
38	LHP	Todd Dedeaux	L/L	6 ft 0 in (1.83 m)	185 lb (84 kg)	Fr	Pasadena, California
39	INF	Kellan Broines	R/R	5 ft 11 in (1.8 m)	175 lb (79 kg)	Fr	Honolulu, Hawaii
40	RHP	Shaun Kramer	R/R	6 ft 2 in (1.88 m)	180 lb (82 kg)	Jr	Diamond Bar, California
41	OF	Michael Morales	R/R	5 ft 11 in (1.8 m)	180 lb (82 kg)	So	Anaheim, California
42	RHP	Bret Butler	R/R	6 ft 3 in (1.91 m)	180 lb (82 kg)	Fr	Woodinville, Washington
44	OF	Abel Montanez	R/R	6 ft 1 in (1.85 m)	195 lb (88 kg)	RS Sr	Montebello, California
45	C	Nick Mosich	R/R	5 ft 11 in (1.8 m)	180 lb (82 kg)	So	Santa Ana, California
47	INF	Jon Brewster	R/R	6 ft 0 in (1.83 m)	170 lb (77 kg)	Fr	Sherman Oaks, California
50	INF	Bill Peavey	L/L	6 ft 4 in (1.93 m)	230 lb (104 kg)	Sr	Brisbane, California

Head coach

Mike Gillespie

Assistant coach(es)

Hitting coach(es)

Andy Nieto

Pitching coach(es)

John Savage
Rob Klein

Legend

- (C) Team captain
- (S) Suspended
- (I) Ineligible
- Injured
- Current redshirt

Roster
Last update: September 9, 2020

== Schedule ==
2001 USC Trojans baseball game log
Regular season
January (1–0)

#	Date	Opponent	Rank	Site/stadium	Score	Overall record	Pac-10 record
1	January 31	Santa Clara	No. 2	Dedeaux Field • Los Angeles, California	W 10–3	1–0	0–0

February (8–4)

#	Date	Opponent	Rank	Site/stadium	Score	Overall record	Pac-10 record
2	February 3	Louisville	No. 2	Dedeaux Field • Los Angeles, California	W 19–4	2–0	0–0
3	February 4	Louisville	No. 2	Dedeaux Field • Los Angeles, California	W 11–4	3–0	0–0
4	February 6	No. 12 Cal State Fullerton	No. 2	Dedeaux Field • Los Angeles, California	W 6–5	4–0	0–0
5	February 9	at No. 22 Long Beach State	No. 2	Blair Field • Long Beach, California	W 6–2	5–0	0–0
6	February 10	No. 22 Long Beach State	No. 2	Dedeaux Field • Los Angeles, California	W 10–1	6–0	0–0
7	February 11	at No. 22 Long Beach State	No. 2	Blair Field • Long Beach, California	L 5–9	6–1	0–0
8	February 16	at UCLA	No. 3	Jackie Robinson Stadium • Los Angeles, California	L 3–4	6–2	0–0
9	February 17	at UCLA	No. 3	Jackie Robinson Field • Los Angeles, California	W 6–0	7–2	0–0
10	February 18	at UCLA	No. 3	Jackie Robinson Stadium • Los Angeles, California	W 5–4	8–2	0–0
11	February 20	Loyola Marymount	No. 3	Dedeaux Field • Los Angeles, California	L 1–9	8–3	0–0
12	February 21	at Pepperdine	No. 3	Eddy D. Field Stadium • Malibu, California	L 3–5	8–4	0–0
13	February 23	No. 30 Mississippi State	No. 3	Dedeaux Field • Los Angeles, California	W 7–3	9–4	0–0

March (11–7)

#	Date	Opponent	Rank	Site/stadium	Score	Overall record	Pac-10 record
14	March 3	at Houston	No. 5	Schroeder Park • Houston, Texas	W 6–3	10–4	0–0
15	March 3	at Houston	No. 5	Schroeder Park • Houston, Texas	W 6–3	11–4	0–0
16	March 4	at Houston	No. 5	Schroeder Park • Houston, Texas	W 4–3	12–4	0–0
17	March 6	UC Riverside	No. 4	Dedeaux Field • Los Angeles, California	L 4–6	12–5	0–0
18	March 9	at No. 9 Stanford	No. 4	Sunken Diamond • Stanford, California	L 0–2	12–6	0–0
19	March 10	at No. 9 Stanford	No. 4	Sunken Diamond • Stanford, California	L 3–15	12–7	0–0
20	March 11	at No. 9 Stanford	No. 4	Sunken Diamond • Stanford, California	L 5–9	12–8	0–0
21	March 13	at UC Santa Barbara	No. 13	Caesar Uyesaka Stadium • Santa Barbara, California	W 12–5	13–8	0–0
22	March 14	San Diego	No. 13	Dedeaux Field • Los Angeles, California	W 4–3	14–8	0–0
23	March 17	at Washington	No. 13	Husky Ballpark • Seattle, Washington	W 5–1	15–8	1–0
24	March 19	at Washington	No. 12	Husky Ballpark • Seattle, Washington	L 6–7	15–9	1–1
25	March 19	at Washington	No. 12	Husky Ballpark • Seattle, Washington	L 3–7	15–10	1–2
26	March 21	No. 18 Pepperdine	No. 12	Dedeaux Field • Los Angeles, California	W 9–3	16–10	1–2
27	March 23	at Arizona	No. 12	Jerry Kindall Field at Frank Sancet Stadium • Tucson, Arizona	W 8–0	17–10	2–2
28	March 24	at Arizona	No. 12	Jerry Kindall Field at Frank Sancet Stadium • Tucson, Arizona	W 6–4	18–10	3–2
29	March 25	at Arizona	No. 12	Jerry Kindall Field at Frank Sancet Stadium • Tucson, Arizona	W 8–7	19–10	4–2
30	March 27	at No. 29 Cal State Fullerton	No. 12	Titan Field • Fullerton, California	L 11–12	19–11	4–2
31	March 28	San Diego State	No. 12	Dedeaux Field • Los Angeles, California	W 16–7	20–11	4–2

April (13–5)

#	Date	Opponent	Rank	Site/stadium	Score	Overall record	Pac-10 record
32	April 3	at San Diego State	No. 15	Tony Gwynn Stadium • San Diego, California	W 2–1	21–11	4–2
33	April 6	No. 9 Arizona State	No. 15	Dedeaux Field • Los Angeles, California	W 11–2	22–11	5–2
34	April 7	No. 9 Arizona State	No. 15	Dedeaux Field • Los Angeles, California	W 5–1	23–11	6–2
35	April 8	No. 9 Arizona State	No. 15	Dedeaux Field • Los Angeles, California	L 1–11	23–12	6–3
36	April 10	UC Santa Barbara	No. 10	Dedeaux Field • Los Angeles, California	W 6–4	24–12	6–3
37	April 14	at California	No. 10	Evans Diamond • Berkeley, California	W 1–0	25–12	7–3
38	April 15	at California	No. 10	Evans Diamond • Berkeley, California	W 5–3	26–12	8–3
39	April 16	at California	No. 10	Evans Diamond • Berkeley, California	L 4–5	26–13	8–4
40	April 17	at UC Riverside	No. 7	Riverside Sports Complex • Riverside, California	W 14–2	27–13	8–4
41	April 20	No. 1 Stanford	No. 7	Dedeaux Field • Los Angeles, California	W 2–1	28–13	9–4
42	April 21	No. 1 Stanford	No. 7	Dedeaux Field • Los Angeles, California	W 7–0	29–13	10–4
43	April 22	No. 1 Stanford	No. 7	Dedeaux Field • Los Angeles, California	L 5–9	29–14	10–5
44	April 23	San Francisco	No. 6	Dedeaux Field • Los Angeles, California	L 8–10	29–15	10–5
45	April 24	at Loyola Marymount	No. 6	George C. Page Stadium • Los Angeles, California	L 7–13	29–16	10–5
46	April 27	UCLA	No. 6	Dedeaux Field • Los Angeles, California	W 2–0	30–16	11–5
47	April 28	UCLA	No. 6	Dedeaux Field • Los Angeles, California	W 7–6	31–16	12–5
48	April 29	UCLA	No. 6	Dedeaux Field • Los Angeles, California	W 7–1	32–16	13–5
49	April 30	at San Diego	No. 4	Fowler Park • San Diego, California	W 5–4	33–16	13–5

May (6–1)

#	Date	Opponent	Rank	Site/stadium	Score	Overall record	Pac-10 record
50	May 12	Washington State	No. 3	Dedeaux Field • Los Angeles, California	W 7–6	34–16	14–5
51	May 13	Washington State	No. 3	Dedeaux Field • Los Angeles, California	W 7–0	35–16	15–5
52	May 14	Washington State	No. 1	Dedeaux Field • Los Angeles, California	W 5–1	36–16	16–5
53	May 15	Long Beach State	No. 1	Dedeaux Field • Los Angeles, California	W 10–2	37–16	16–5
54	May 18	at Oregon State	No. 1	Goss Stadium at Coleman Field • Beaverton, Oregon	W 7–3	38–16	17–5
55	May 19	at Oregon State	No. 1	Goss Stadium at Coleman Field • Beaverton, Oregon	L 0–6	38–17	17–6
56	May 20	at Oregon State	No. 1	Goss Stadium at Coleman Field • Beaverton, Oregon	W 1–0	39–17	18–6

Postseason
Los Angeles Regional (3–0)

#	Date	Opponent	Seed/Rank	Site/stadium	Score	Overall record	Pac-10 record
57	May 25	(4) No. 25 Oral Roberts	(1) No. 2	Dedeaux Field • Los Angeles, California	W 12–4	40–17	18–6
58	May 26	(2) No. 13 Pepperdine	(1) No. 2	Dedeaux Field • Los Angeles, California	W 4–3	41–17	18–6
59	May 27	(3) Fresno State	(1) No. 2	Dedeaux Field • Los Angeles, California	W 8–0	42–17	18–6

Los Angeles Super Regional (2–0)

#	Date	Seed/Rank	Opponent	Site/stadium	Score	Overall record	Pac-10 record
60	June 1	No. 19 FIU	(3) No. 2	Dedeaux Field • Los Angeles, California	W 5–1	43–17	18–6
61	June 2	No. 19 FIU	(3) No. 2	Dedeaux Field • Los Angeles, California	W 6–0	44–17	18–6

College World Series (1–2)

#	Date	Opponent	Seed/Rank	Site/stadium	Score	Overall record	Pac-10 record
62	June 9	vs. (6) No. 7 Georgia	(3) No. 2	Johnny Rosenblatt Stadium • Omaha, Nebraska	W 11–5	45–17	18–6
63	June 11	vs. (2) No. 1 Miami (FL)	(3) No. 2	Johnny Rosenblatt Stadium • Omaha, Nebraska	L 3–4	45–18	18–6
64	June 12	vs. No. 8 Tennessee	(3) No. 2	Johnny Rosenblatt Stadium • Omaha, Nebraska	L 2–10	45–19	18–6

== Awards and honors ==
Brian Barre

- First Team All-Pac-10

Alberto Concepcion

- Honorable Mention All-Pac-10

Rik Currier

- Second Team All-American The Sports Network
- Third Team All-American Baseball America
- Third Team All-American Collegiate Baseball
- First Team All-Pac-10

Anthony Lunetta

- Honorable Mention All-Pac-10

Michael Moon

- Honorable Mention All-Pac-10

Mark Prior

- First Team All-American American Baseball Coaches Association
- First Team All-American Baseball America
- First Team All-American Collegiate Baseball
- First Team All-American National Collegiate Baseball Writers Association
- First Team All-American The Sports Network
- First Team All-American USA Today Sports Weekly
- Pac-10 Conference Pitcher of the Year
- First Team All-Pac-10

Bill Peavey

- Honorable Mention All-Pac-10

Josh Persell

- Honorable Mention All-Pac-10
