= 2001 NCAA Division I baseball rankings =

2001 NCAA Division I baseball season

Tournament
- Duration: May 25–June 16, 2001

College World Series
- Duration: June 8–June 16, 2001
- Champions: Miami (FL) (4th title)
- Runners-up: Stanford
- MOP: Charlton Jimerson

Seasons
- ← 2000 2002 →

The following polls make up the 2001 NCAA Division I baseball rankings. USA Today and ESPN began publishing the Coaches' Poll of 31 active coaches ranking the top 25 teams in the nation in 1992. Each coach is a member of the American Baseball Coaches Association. Baseball America began publishing its poll of the top 20 teams in college baseball in 1981. Beginning with the 1985 season, it expanded to the top 25. Collegiate Baseball Newspaper published its first human poll of the top 20 teams in college baseball in 1957, and expanded to rank the top 30 teams in 1961.

== Legend ==
	Increase in ranking
	Decrease in ranking
	Not ranked previous week
Italics	Number of first place votes
(#-#)	Win–loss record
т	Tied with team above or below also with this symbol

== USA Today/ESPN Coaches' Poll ==
Currently, only the final poll from the 2001 season is available.

Rank	Team
1	Miami (FL)
2	Stanford
3	Cal State Fullerton
4	Southern California
5	Tennessee
6	Tulane
7	Nebraska
8	Georgia
9	LSU
10	Florida State
11	East Carolina
12	Rice
13	South Carolina
14	Clemson
15	Notre Dame
16	UCF
17	Mississippi State
18	FIU
19	Wake Forest
20	Pepperdine
21	Georgia Tech
22	Arizona State
23	Texas Tech
24	South Alabama
25	Baylor

== Baseball America ==
Currently, only the final poll from the 2001 season is available.

Rank	Team
1	Miami (FL)
2	Stanford
3	Cal State Fullerton
4	Southern California
5	Tulane
6	Nebraska
7	Georgia
8	Tennessee
9	LSU
10	Florida State
11	East Carolina
12	South Carolina
13	Rice
14	UCF
15	Notre Dame
16	Pepperdine
17	Clemson
18	Wake Forest
19	Mississippi State
20	FIU
21	Texas Tech
22	Arizona State
23	South Alabama
24	Winthrop
25	Rutgers

== Collegiate Baseball ==
	Preseason Dec 20	Week 1 Feb 5	Week 2 Feb 12	Week 3 Feb 19	Week 4 Feb 26	Week 5 Mar 5	Week 6 Mar 12	Week 7 Mar 19	Week 8 Mar 26	Week 9 Apr 2	Week 10 Apr 9	Week 11 Apr 16	Week 12 Apr 23	Week 13 Apr 30	Week 14 May 7	Week 15 May 14	Week 16 May 21	Week 17 May 28	Week 18 June 6	Week 19 June 18	
1.	Georgia Tech	Georgia Tech (0–0)	Rice (7–0)	Rice (10–1)	Georgia Tech (7–1)	Georgia Tech (12–2)	Rice (18–4)	Rice (21–5)	Stanford (21–5)	Rice (28–6)	Stanford (27–7)	Stanford (31–7)	Notre Dame (35–5–1)	Notre Dame (40–6–1)	Cal State Fullerton (38–11)	Southern California (35–16)	Miami (FL) (44–12)	Miami (FL) (47–12)	Miami (FL) (49–12)	Miami (FL) (53–12)	1.
2.	Southern California	Southern California (3–0)	Georgia Tech (2–1)	Georgia Tech (4–1)	Rice (13–2)	LSU (12–2–1)	South Carolina (16–2)	Stanford (18–5)	Rice (25–6)	Stanford (24–6)	LSU (24–9–1)	Notre Dame (31–5–1)	Stanford (32–10)	LSU (35–13–1)	Notre Dame (43–8–1)	Miami (FL) (41–12)	Southern California (39–17)	Southern California (42–17)	Southern California (44–17)	Stanford (51–17)	2.
3.	LSU	LSU (0–0)	Southern California (6–1)	Southern California (8–2)	LSU (9–2)	Rice (15–3)	Stanford (18–5)	Arizona State (19–5–1)	Georgia Tech (20–6)	Georgia Tech (23–7)	Florida State (31–7)	LSU (27–11–1)	LSU (30–13–1)	Cal State Fullerton (33–11)	Southern California (33–16)	Notre Dame (45–9–1)	Nebraska (45–15)	Nebraska (48–14)	Nebraska (50–14)	Cal State Fullerton (48–18)	3.
4.	Nebraska	Nebraska (0–0)	LSU (2–1)	LSU (5–2)	South Carolina (12–0)	Southern California (12–4)	Arizona State (17–4–1)	Georgia Tech (17–5)	Arizona State (20–6–1)	LSU (21–8–1)	Notre Dame (25–5–1)	Florida State (33–9)	Nebraska (34–9)	Southern California (32–16)	Miami (FL) (38–12)	Stanford (39–14)	Stanford (42–14)	Stanford (46–15)	Stanford (48–16)	Tennessee (48–20)	4.
5.	Clemson	Clemson (0–0)	Clemson (0–0)	South Carolina (9–0)	Southern California (9–4)	South Carolina (13–1)	Nebraska (12–3)	Nebraska (16–4)	Miami (FL) (25–6)	Florida State (27–7)	Nebraska (25–8)	Nebraska (30–8)	Cal State Fullerton (30–11)	Miami (FL) (35–11)	Nebraska (38–12)	Nebraska (41–14)	Cal State Fullerton (41–15)	Cal State Fullerton (44–16)	Cal State Fullerton (46–16)	Southern California (45–19)	5.
6.	Arizona State	Arizona State (4–1)	Arizona State (8–1)	Arizona State (12–2)	Arizona State (13–2)	Arizona State (13–4–1)	Pepperdine (15–4)	Miami (FL) (21–6	Tennessee (24–3)	Notre Dame (21–4–1)	Georgia Tech (26–8)	Cal State Fullerton (26–10)	Southern California (29–14)	Stanford (34–12)	Stanford (35–13)	Cal State Fullerton (39–14)	Tulane (50–10)	Tulane (53–10)	Tulane (55–11)	Tulane (56–13)	6.
7.	Rice	Rice (3–0)	Nebraska (1–2)	Auburn (10–0)	Auburn (13–0)	Miami (FL) (15–3)	Georgia Tech (13–5)	South Carolina (19–4)	South Carolina (22–4)	Stetson (25–4)	Stetson (29–5)	Southern California (26–13)	Miami (FL) (33–10)	Nebraska (35–12)	Florida State (38–14)	Florida State (40–15)	Florida State (43–17)	Florida State (46–17)	Georgia (47–20)	Nebraska (50–16)	7.
8.	Florida State	Florida State (2–0)	Miami (FL) (6–2)	Miami (FL) (9–2)	Miami (FL) (12–3)	Auburn (14–1)	Notre Dame (8–2)	Notre Dame (13–2–1)	South Alabama (26–3)	Clemson (21–8)	Rice (30–9)	Rice (34–10)	Stetson (36–6)	Stetson (40–6)	LSU (36–16–1)	Tulane (45–9)	Notre Dame (46–11–1)	Georgia (45–19)	Tennessee (46–18)	Georgia (47–22)	8.
9.	Miami (FL)	Miami (FL) (3–1)	South Carolina (6–0)	Stanford (9–4)	Stanford (11–4)	Stanford (14–5)	Miami (FL) (17–5)	LSU (17–6–1)	LSU (19–7–1)	Arizona State (21–9–1)	Cal State Fullerton (22–10)	Miami (FL) (30–10)	Florida State (34–12)	Ole Miss (34–14–1)	East Carolina (42–10)	Georgia (40–16)	Georgia (41–18)	East Carolina (47–11)	Florida State (47–19)	Florida State (47–19)	9.
10.	South Carolina	South Carolina (2–0)	Stanford (7–3)	Clemson (2–1)	Pepperdine (10–2)	Pepperdine (12–3)	Clemson (10–4)	Clemson (14–5)	Stetson (23–3)	Nebraska (22–7)	Southern California (23–12)	Stetson (32–6)	Ole Miss (30–13–1)	Florida State 935–14)	Tulane (42–8)	East Carolina (44–11)	East Carolina (44–11)	LSU (43–20–1)	LSU (44–22–1)	LSU (44–22–1)	10.
11.	Stanford	Auburn (3–0)	Aurburn (6–0)	Nebraska (3–3)	Notre Dame (5–1)	Nebraska (9–3)	LSU (13–6–1)	Tennessee (20–3)	Florida State (23–6)	Tennessee (26–6)	Miami (FL) (28–9)	Georgia Tech (29–10)	Rice (36–13)	East Carolina (41–10)	Georgia (36–15)	LSU (37–18–1)	LSU (40–19–1)	Notre Dame (48–12–1)	East Carolina (47–13)	East Carolina (47–13)	11.
12.	Cal State Fullerton	Stanford (4–3)	Oklahoma State (6–1)	Notre Dame (2–1)	Nebraska (6–3)	Notre Dame (6–2)	Oklahoma State (16–3)	Southern California (15–8)	Southern California (19–10)	South Carolina (24–7)	Baylor (27–10)	Tennessee (31–9)	Clemson (28–15)	Tulane (39–8)	Rice (38–15)	UCF (45–11)	UCF (49–12)	Clemson (41–20)	Notre Dame (48–12–1)	Notre Dame (48–12–1)	12.
13.	Florida	Long Beach State (3–0)	Florida State (2–3)	Pepperdine (8–1)	Clemson (5–3)	Clemson (7–4)	Southern California (12–8)	South Alabama (22–3)	Notre Dame (16–4–1)	South Alabama (26–6)	South Alabama (28–7)	Clemson (25–13)	Tennessee (33–10)	Rice (38–15)	Clemson (33–18)	Clemson (37–18)	Pepperdine (41–16)	Tennessee (44–18)	Clemson (41–22)	Clemson (41–22)	13.
14.	Notre Dame	Notre Dame (0–0)	Notre Dame (0–0)	Oklahoma State (7–2)	Oklahoma State (9–2)	Oklahoma State (11–3)	UCF (17–4)	Stetson (20–3)	Clemson (17–7)	Cal State Fullerton (19–10)	Tennessee (28–8)	East Carolina (33–9)	East Carolina (36–10)	Clemson (31–17)	Georgia Tech (36–14)	Pepperdine (39–15)	Clemson (38–20)	Mississippi State (39–22)	Mississippi State (39–24)	Mississippi State (39–24)	14.
15.	Oklahoma	Cal State Fullerton (1–3)	Long Beach State (4–2)	Florida State (3–4)	UCF (10–4)	UCF (12–4)	Auburn (16–4)	UCF (21–5)	Nebraska (17–7)	Southern California (20–11)	South Carolina (26–9)	Ole Miss (27–12–1)	Georgia Tech (31–12)	Georgia Tech (33–14)	Arizona State (31–16–1)	Arizona State (33–16–1)	Rice (43–17)	South Carolina (48–18)	South Carolina (49–20)	South Carolina (49–20)	15.
16.	Georgia	Georgia (0–0)	Georgia (0–0)	Georgia (2–0)	Stetson (9–1)	Stetson (11–2)	Stetson (16–2)	Florida State (18–6)	Ole Miss (21–6–1)	Miami (FL) (25–9)	Arizona State (22–11–1)	Pepperdine (26–12)	Pepperdine (31–12)	Arizona State (30–15–1)	Tennessee (38–14)	Rice (40–17)	Arizona State (36–18–1)	Rice (46–18)	Rice (47–20)	Rice (47–20)	16.
17.	Baylor	Florida (0–1)	Cal State Fullerton (3–5)	Cal State Fullerton (6–6)	South Alabama (10–2)	South Alabama (13–3)	South Alabama (19–3)	Oklahoma State (19–5)	East Carolina (22–5)	Baylor (24–9)	Clemson (21–12)	Arizona State (24–13–1)	Tulane (35–8)	Pepperdine (32–14)	Pepperdine (35–15)	Tennessee (41–15)	Wake Forest (41–16)	UCF (51–14)	UCF (51–14)	UCF (51–14)	17.
18.	Auburn	Baylor (2–1)	Baylor (4–3)	Baylor (8–3)	East Carolina (10–0)	Florida State (9–5)	Florida State (14–5)	Pepperdine (16–7)	The Citadel (20–6)	Texas (24–12)	UCF (30–8)	Mississippi State (21–14)	Mississippi State (26–15)	Georgia (31–15)	UCF (42–11)	Wake Forest (37–15)	Tennessee (41–17)	Wake Forest (44–18)	Wake Forest (44–18)	Wake Forest (44–18)	18.
19.	UCF	Oklahoma State (3–0)	UCF (5–1)	UCF (7–3)	Florida State (4–5)	East Carolina (13–1)	East Carolina (16–2)	Ole Miss (18–5–1)	UCF (24–7)	UCF (27–7)	Alabama (23–12)	South Carolina (29–11)	Arizona State (26–14–1)	Tennessee (34–13)	Stetson (41–10)	Georgia Tech (39–16)	Mississippi State (36–22)	FIU (42–18)	FIU (42–20)	FIU (42–20)	19.
20.	Stetson	Stetson (0–0)	Pepperdine (6–0)	Alabama (7–1)	Southern Miss (9–3)	Southern Miss (10–4)	Tennessee (16–2)	East Carolina (18–5)	Pepperdine (18–9)	Ole Miss (23–8–1)	Texas (26–14)	Texas (28–16)	Baylor (30–15)	South Carolina (34–14)	Ole Miss (35–17–1)	UC Santa Barbara (37–13)	Georgia Tech (41–18)	Pepperdine (42–18)	Pepperdine (42–18)	Pepperdine (42–18)	20.
21.	Mississippi State	Mississippi State (0–0)	Mississippi State (0–0)	Long Beach State (4–4)	Arkansas (8–2)	Baylor (14–5)	Mississippi State (9–5)	The Citadel (20–6)	Baylor (21–8)	East Carolina (25–7)	East Carolina (29–8)	Baylor (27–14)	Texas (30–18)	Baylor (33–17)	South Carolina (39–14)	Texas Tech (39–16–1)	UC Santa Barbara (39–15)	Texas Tech (43–20–1)	Texas Tech (42–20–1)	Texas Tech (43–20–1)	21.
22.	Long Beach State	Oklahoma (1–1)	Florida (1–3)	Stetson (5–1)	Tennessee (9–1)	UCLA (11–5)	Tulane (17–3)	Middle Tennessee (15–2)	Texas (20–12)	Ohio State (20–5)	Ole Miss (25–10–1)	South Alabama (30–10)	Wake Forest (31–12)	UCF (39–11)	Baylor (33–18)	Mississippi State (32–21)	Texas Tech (40–18)	Baylor (37–23)	Baylor (37–23)	Baylor (37–23)	22.
23.	Evansville	UCF (1–1)	Stetson (1–1)	South Alabama (8–1)	Baylor (11–4)	Tennessee (12–2)	Georgia (11–3)	Baylor (18–7)	Tulane (22–5)	The Citadel (22–9)	Florida (25–13)	Tulane (31–8)	Auburn (29–12)	Mississippi State (28–18)	UC Santa Barbara (35–12)	Ole Miss (36–19–1)	Ole Miss (38–21–1)	Arizona State (37–20–1)	Arizona State (37–20–1)	Arizona State (37–20–1)	23.
24.	Alabama	Evansville (0–0)	Alabama (3–0)	Louisiana–Monroe (7–0)	UCLA (10–4)	Tulane (13–3)	Southern Miss (12–6)	Wake Forest (17–4)	Ohio State (16–4)	Alabama (20–11)	Pepperdine (23–12)	UCF (32–10)	South Carolina (31–13)	South Alabama (36–12)	Wake Forest (36–15)	South Carolina (41–15)	South Carolina (44–17)	VCU (41–19)	VCU (41–19)	VCU (41–19)	24.
25.	Tennessee	Alabama (0–0)	Tennessee (3–0)	Wichita State (3–0)	Tulane (10–3)	Georgia (6–2)	Rutgers (9–3)	Texas (16–12)	Oklahoma State (22–7)	Pepperdine (20–11)	Tulane (28–7)	Oral Roberts (28–6)	UCF (36–10)	Ohio State (34–11)	Texas Tech (37–15–1)	Baylor (35–20)	Oral Roberts (48–11)	Rutgers (42–17)	Rutgers (42–17)	Rutgers (42–17)	25.
26.	Texas	Tennessee (0–0)	Evansville (2–1)	East Carolina (6–0)	Long Beach State (5–4)	North Carolina (11–3)	Baylor (15–6)	Alabama (16–7)	Georgia (17–6)	Tulane (24–7)	Ohio State (23–7)	Ohio State (27–8)	South Alabama (32–11)	Auburn (31–14)	South Alabama (38–13)	California (33–23)	California (33–23)	UC Santa Barbara (40–17)	UC Santa Barbara (40–17)	UC Santa Barbara (40–17)	26.
27.	The Citadel	Pepperdine (4–0)	Tulane (7–0)	Tulane (9–2)	Georgia (3–2)	Alabama (11–4)	UCLA (13–7)	Tulane (18–5)	Jacksonville (19–7)	Rutgers (21–7)	Winthrop (30–5–1)	Long Beach State (25–11)	Long Beach State (27–13)	FIU (37–13)	Ohio State (37–13)	Ohio State (41–14)	South Alabama (44–17)	Georgia Tech (41–20)	Georgia Tech (41–20)	Georgia Tech (41–20)	27.
28.	Wake Forest	Wake Forest (0–0)	Wake Forest (3–0)	Tennessee (5–1)	Cal State Fullerton (6–7)	Wake Forest (10–2)	Cal State Fullerton (11–8)	UCLA (15–7)	UCLA (16–7)	Winthrop (25–5–1)	FIU (32–9)	Winthrop (33–7–1)	Georgia (26–15)	Delaware (33–11)	Delaware (37–12)	Delaware (41–13)	Delaware (44–13)	Texas (36–26)	Texas (36–26)	Texas (36–26)	28.
29.	Wichita State	Wichita State (0–0)	Wichita State (0–0)	Florida (4–4)	North Carolina (9–2)	Ole Miss (12–3)	North Carolina (14–4)	Cal State Fullerton (13–9)	Cal State Fullerton (15–10)	VCU (24–6)	Oral Roberts (24–6)	Georgia (24–13)	Purdue (23–16)	San Diego (32–16)	California (30–22)	Middle Tennessee (38–14)	Baylor (35–22)	Winthrop (48–16–1)	Winthrop (48–16–1)	Winthrop (48–16–1)	29.
30.	East Carolina	East Carolina (0–0)	East Carolina (3–0)	Mississippi State (0–2)	Alabama (8–4)	Rutgers (7–2)	Wake Forest (13–3)	VCU (18–5)	VCU (21–6)	FIU (30–8)	Long Beach State (21–11)	Texas Tech (30–14)	FIU (35–12)	Oral Roberts (35–9)	Florida (31–21)	Rutgers (40–13)	Ohio State (43–16)	Auburn (37–21)	Auburn (37–21)	Auburn (37–21)	30.
	Preseason Dec 20	Week 1 Feb 5	Week 2 Feb 12	Week 3 Feb 19	Week 4 Feb 26	Week 5 Mar 5	Week 6 Mar 12	Week 7 Mar 19	Week 8 Mar 26	Week 9 Apr 2	Week 10 Apr 9	Week 11 Apr 16	Week 12 Apr 23	Week 13 Apr 30	Week 14 May 7	Week 15 May 14	Week 16 May 21	Week 17 May 28	Week 18 June 6	Week 19 June 18	
		Dropped: 26 Texas; 27 The Citadel	Dropped: 22 Oklahoma	Dropped: 26 Evansville; 28 Wake Forest	Dropped: 24 Louisiana–Monroe; 25 Wichita State; 29 Florida; 30 Mississippi State	Dropped: 21 Arkansas; 26 Long Beach State; 28 Cal State Fullerton	Dropped: 29 Ole Miss; 30 Rutgers	Dropped: 21 Mississippi State; 23 Georgia; 24 Southern Miss; 25 Rutgers; 29 North Carolina; 30 Wake Forest	Dropped: 22 Middle Tennessee; 24 Wake Forest; 26 Alabama	Dropped: 25 Oklahoma State; 26 Georgia; 27 Jacksonville; 28 UCLA	Dropped: 23 The Citadel; 27 Rutgers; 29 VCU	Dropped: 19 Alabama; 23 Florida; 28 FIU	Dropped: 25 Oral Roberts; 26 Ohio State; 28 Winthrop; 30 Texas Tech	Dropped: 21 Texas; 22 Wake Forest; 27 Long Beach State; 29 Purdue	Dropped: 23 Mississippi State; 26 Auburn; 27 FIU; 29 San Diego; 30 Oral Roberts	Dropped: 19 Stetson; 26 South Alabama; 30 Florida	Dropped: 29 Middle Tennessee; 30 Rutgers	Dropped: 23 Ole Miss; 25 Oral Roberts; 26 California; 27 South Alabama; 28 Delaware; 30 Ohio State	None	None	

The pre-season poll ranked the top 40 teams. Those not listed in the table above were: 31. FIU 32. Southern Miss 33. Tulane 34. Texas A&M 35. Oklahoma State 36. Fresno State 37. Pepperdine 38. Virginia Tech 39. Minnesota 40. Penn State.

== NCBWA ==
Currently, only the final poll from the 2001 season is available.

Rank	Team
1	Miami (FL)
2	Stanford
3	Cal State Fullerton
4	Tennessee
5	Southern California
6	Tulane
7	Georgia
8	Nebraska
9	LSU
10	Florida State
11	Rice
12	East Carolina
13	South Carolina
14	Clemson
15	Mississippi State
16	FIU
17	UCF
18	Pepperdine
19	Georgia Tech
20	Wake Forest
21	South Alabama
22	Texas Tech
23	Winthrop
24	Oklahoma State
25	Ole Miss
26	Middle Tennessee
27	California
28	Rutgers
29	Delaware
30	Ohio State
31	Arizona State
32	Baylor
33	Wichita State
34	Texas
35	VCU
