= 2001 Florida Gators baseball team =

2001 University of Florida baseball team

2001 Florida Gators baseball

Coral Gables Regional, 1–2
- Conference: Southeastern Conference
- Record: 35–27 (16–14 SEC)
- Head coach: Andy Lopez (7th year)
- Assistant coach: Mark Wasikowski (3rd year)
- Home stadium: Alfred A. McKethan Stadium

2001 Southeastern Conference baseball standings
	Conf.				Overall
Team	W		L	PCT	W		L	PCT
Eastern
No. 8 Georgia ^{x}‍†‍‍^{y}	20	–	10	.667	45	–	19	.703
No. 4 Tennessee ‍‍‍^{y}	18	–	12	.600	48	–	20	.706
No. 15 South Carolina ‍‍‍^{y}	17	–	13	.567	48	–	18	.727
Florida ‍‍‍^{y}	16	–	14	.533	35	–	27	.565
Vanderbilt ‍‍‍	9	–	21	.300	23	–	31	.426
Kentucky ‍‍‍	7	–	23	.233	22	–	34	.393
Western
No. 10 LSU ^{x}‍‍‍^{y}	18	–	12	.600	44	–	22	.667
#14 Mississippi State‡^{y} ‍‍‍	17	–	13	.567	39	–	22	.639
Ole Miss ‍‍‍^{y}	17	–	13	.567	39	–	23	.629
No. 30 Auburn ‍‍‍^{y}	15	–	15	.500	32	–	23	.582
Alabama ‍‍‍	15	–	15	.500	32	–	23	.582
Arkansas ‍‍‍	11	–	19	.367	27	–	29	.482
x – Division champion † – Conference champion ‡ – Tournament champion y – Invited to the NCAA tournament As of June 30, 2001; Rankings from Collegiate Baseball

The 2001 Florida Gators baseball team represented the University of Florida in the sport of baseball during the 2001 college baseball season. The Gators competed in Division I of the National Collegiate Athletic Association (NCAA) and the Eastern Division of the Southeastern Conference (SEC). They played their home games at Alfred A. McKethan Stadium, on the university's Gainesville, Florida campus. The team was coached by Andy Lopez, who was in his seventh and final season at Florida. Lopez was dismissed after the conclusion of the season.

== Roster ==
2001 Florida Gators baseball team
Players
Coaches

#	Pos.	Name	B/T	Height	Weight	Year	Home town
24	RHP	Jay Belflower	R/R	6 ft 4 in (1.93 m)	217 lb (98 kg)	Jr	Sebring, FL
48	LHP	Kenny Birch	L/L	5 ft 10 in (1.78 m)	165 lb (75 kg)	Sr	Winter Springs, FL
52	LHP	Matt Bomeisl	L/L	5 ft 10 in (1.78 m)	164 lb (74 kg)	Fr	Miami, FL
45	RHP	Keith Brice	R/R	6 ft 1 in (1.85 m)	195 lb (88 kg)	Sr	Miami, FL
41	RHP	Jeff Cardozo	R/R	6 ft 5 in (1.96 m)	195 lb (88 kg)	Sr	Hobe Sound, FL
49	RHP	Kevin Coleman	R/R	6 ft 1 in (1.85 m)	196 lb (89 kg)	Jr	Marietta, GA
2	INF	Aaron Davidson	R/R	5 ft 8 in (1.73 m)	168 lb (76 kg)	Jr	Atascadero, CA
30	OF	Jason Dill	L/L	6 ft 0 in (1.83 m)	210 lb (95 kg)	Sr	Punta Gorda, FL
15	RHP	Scot Drucker	R/R	6 ft 0 in (1.83 m)	183 lb (83 kg)	Fr	Miami, FL
13	INF	Kevin Estrada	S/R	6 ft 0 in (1.83 m)	180 lb (82 kg)	Jr	El Segundo, CA
9	OF	Matt Gross	L/L	5 ft 11 in (1.8 m)	185 lb (84 kg)	Jr	Bartow, FL
18	OF	Ben Harrison	R/R	6 ft 3 in (1.91 m)	190 lb (86 kg)	Fr	Key West, FL
21	RHP	Alex Hart	R/R	6 ft 5 in (1.96 m)	219 lb (99 kg)	So	Marion, PA
25	RHP	Ben Hedgecock	R/R	6 ft 5 in (1.96 m)	200 lb (91 kg)	So	Tampa, FL
28	RHP	Jay Hollenkamp	S/L	6 ft 4 in (1.93 m)	195 lb (88 kg)	Fr	Valrico, FL
33	INF	James Keel	R/R	6 ft 3 in (1.91 m)	188 lb (85 kg)	Fr	Panama City, FL
17	INF	Mark Kiger	R/R	5 ft 11 in (1.8 m)	190 lb (86 kg)	Jr	La Jolla, CA
16	OF	David Klebonis	R/R	6 ft 0 in (1.83 m)	195 lb (88 kg)	Jr	Orlando, FL
37	INF	Matthew Maley	L/R	6 ft 1 in (1.85 m)	165 lb (75 kg)	Fr	Miami, FL
56	RHP	Mike Mlotkowski	R/R	6 ft 5 in (1.96 m)	209 lb (95 kg)	Fr	Fairfax Station, VA
26	OF	Peter Nystrom	R/R	6 ft 2 in (1.88 m)	195 lb (88 kg)	Sr	Dunedin, FL
6	INF	Pat Osborn	R/R	6 ft 4 in (1.93 m)	205 lb (93 kg)	So	Bakersfield, CA
32	LHP	Tom Potter	L/L	6 ft 1 in (1.85 m)	190 lb (86 kg)	Fr	Naples, FL
29	LHP	Keith Ramsey	L/L	6 ft 0 in (1.83 m)	170 lb (77 kg)	Jr	Los Angeles, CA
36	LHP	Jimmy Ramshaw	L/L	6 ft 4 in (1.93 m)	200 lb (91 kg)	Jr	Canberra, AUS
22	LHP	Eddie Rojas	S/L	5 ft 8 in (1.73 m)	158 lb (72 kg)	Sr	Brooklyn, NY
55	C	Brian Rose	R/R	6 ft 2 in (1.88 m)	231 lb (105 kg)	So	Miami, FL
20	RHP	Pat Rumble	R/R	5 ft 10 in (1.78 m)	170 lb (77 kg)	Fr	Jacksonville, FL
31	RHP	Ryan Sadowski	R/R	6 ft 2 in (1.88 m)	199 lb (90 kg)	Fr	Davie, FL
43	INF	Ryan Shealy	R/R	6 ft 5 in (1.96 m)	252 lb (114 kg)	Jr	Fort Lauderdale, FL
11	OF	Matt Siegel	L/R	5 ft 10 in (1.78 m)	185 lb (84 kg)	Sr	Tampa, FL
34	RHP	Joey Simon	R/R	6 ft 0 in (1.83 m)	175 lb (79 kg)	So	Tampa, FL
12	INF	C.J. Smith	R/R	6 ft 3 in (1.91 m)	174 lb (79 kg)	Fr	Tampa, FL
14	INF	Aaron Sobieraj	R/R	6 ft 1 in (1.85 m)	190 lb (86 kg)	So	Clearwater, FL
54	RHP	T.J. Stanton	L/R	6 ft 3 in (1.91 m)	177 lb (80 kg)	Fr	Port St. Lucie, FL
38	C	Nick Trefry	R/R	5 ft 10 in (1.78 m)	185 lb (84 kg)	Sr	Jacksonville, FL
27	RHP	K.O. Wiegandt	R/R	6 ft 0 in (1.83 m)	191 lb (87 kg)	Sr	Miami, FL

Head coach

Andy Lopez

Assistant coach(es)

Mark Wasikowski

Legend

- (C) Team captain
- (S) Suspended
- (I) Ineligible
- Injured
- Current redshirt

Roster

== Schedule ==
2001 Florida Gators baseball game log
Regular season
February

Date	Opponent	Rank	Stadium Site	Score	Win	Loss	Save	Attendance	Overall Record	SEC Record
February 3	No. 9 Miami (FL); Rivalry	No. 13	McKethan Stadium	5–14	Sheffield (1–0)	Simon (0–1)	None	3,522	0–1	–
February 7	Savannah State	No. 17	McKethan Stadium	35–1	Belflower (1–0)	Fries	None	521	1–1	–
February 9	at No. 9 Miami (FL); Rivalry	No. 17	Mark Light Stadium; Coral Gables, FL	4–10	Walker (2–0)	Simon (0–2)	None	4,523	1–2	–
February 10	at No. 9 Miami (FL); Rivalry	No. 17	Mark Light Stadium	7–8	DeBold (1–1)	Ramsey (0–1)	None	5,271	1–3	–
February 13	Charleston Southern	No. 22	McKethan Stadium	12–3	Stanton (1–0)	Viars (0–1)	None	–	2–3	–
February 14	Charleston Southern	No. 22	McKethan Stadium	5–2	Simon (1–2)	Coenen (0–1)	Ramsey (1)	984	3–3	–
February 17	at No. 13 Florida State; Rivalry	No. 22	Dick Howser Stadium; Tallahassee, FL	6–19	Lord (1–0)	Belflower (1–1)	None	4,371	3–4	–
February 18	at No. 13 Florida State; Rivalry	No. 22	Dick Howser Stadium	6–5	Simon (2–2)	Read (1–2)	Ramsey (2)	4,167	4–4	–
February 20	Winthrop	No. 29	McKethan Stadium	7–11	Thurmond (1–1)	Hart (0–1)	None	922	4–5	–
February 21	Winthrop	No. 29	McKethan Stadium	5–14	Herauf (3–0)	Ramshaw (0–1)	None	694	4–6	–
February 24	No. 15 Florida State; Rivalry	No. 29	McKethan Stadium	3–2^{10}	Ramsey (1–1)	Roman (0–1)	None	4,012	5–6	–
February 25	No. 15 Florida State; Rivalry	No. 29	McKethan Stadium	11-13	Lynch (1–1)	Belflower (1–2)	Roman (1)	3,854	5–7	–
February 28	Jacksonville		McKethan Stadium	9–7	Brice (1–0)	Ryals (1–1)	Ramsey (3)	1,224	6–7	–

March

Date	Opponent	Rank	Stadium Site	Score	Win	Loss	Save	Attendance	Overall Record	SEC Record
March 2	Central Michigan		McKethan Stadium	11–8	Simon (3–2)	Garner (0–1)	None	1,114	7–7	–
March 3	Central Michigan		McKethan Stadium	14–3	Wells (1–0)	Horvath (0–1)	None	1,346	8–7	–
March 4	Central Michigan		McKethan Stadium	11–2	Ramshaw (1–1)	Opalewski (0–1)	None	716	9–7	–
March 9	No. 23 Tennessee		McKethan Stadium	3–7	Gates (3–1)	Simon (3–3)	Crowe (1)	823	9–8	0–1
March 10	No. 23 Tennessee		McKethan Stadium	6–12	Bertolino (1–0)	Belflower (1–3)	Hicklen (2)	1,742	9–9	0–2
March 11	No. 23 Tennessee		McKethan Stadium	2–8	Crowe (3–0)	Wells (1–1)	None	1,470	9–10	0–3
March 13	Fordham		McKethan Stadium	15–1	Hart (1–1)	Santopolo (0–2)	None	562	10–10	–
March 14	Fordham		McKethan Stadium	11–3	Drucker (1–0)	Kelly (0–1)	None	841	11–10	–
March 16	at No. 11 LSU		Alex Box Stadium; Baton Rouge, LA	10-18	David (2–1)	Ramsey (1–2)	None	8,080	11–11	0–4
March 17	at No. 11 LSU		Alex Box Stadium	3–4	Mestepey (3–0)	Ramshaw (1–2)	Guidry (2)	7,887	11–12	0–5
March 18	at No. 11 LSU		Alex Box Stadium	7–10	Pettit (2–0)	Brice (1–1)	None	7,562	11–13	0–6
March 20	Maine		McKethan Stadium	8–7	Ramsey (2–2)	Truman (0–1)	None	709	12–13	–
March 21	Maine		McKethan Stadium	19–9	Drucker (2–0)	Stoner (1–1)	None	586	13–13	–
March 23	Arkansas		McKethan Stadium	7–4	Birch (1–0)	Merryman (2–2)	None	1,336	14–13	1–6
March 24	Arkansas		McKethan Stadium	8–4	Ramshaw (2–2)	Isaacson (3–4)	None	1,468	15–13	2–6
March 25	Arkansas		McKethan Stadium	4–1	Hart (2–1)	Roehl (2–2)	Simon (1)	921	16–13	3–6
March 27	Bethune–Cookman		McKethan Stadium	9–3	Belflower (2–3)	Johnson (2–3)	None	761	17–13	–
March 28	Florida Atlantic		McKethan Stadium	10–0	Rojas (1–0)	Core (4–5)	None	630	18–13	–
March 30	at Vanderbilt		Hawkins Field; Nashville, TN	9–6^{10}	Simon (4–3)	Ransom (4–2)	None	325	19–13	4–6
March 31	at Vanderbilt		Hawkins Field	1–0	Ramshaw (3–2)	Little (3–3)	Ramsey (4)	510	20–13	5–6

April

Date	Opponent	Rank	Stadium Site	Score	Win	Loss	Save	Attendance	Overall Record	SEC Record
April 1	Vanderbilt		Hawkins Field	9–5	Rojas (2–0)	Maultsby (4–4)	None	349	21–13	6–6
April 4	Florida A&M		McKethan Stadium	14–9	Belflower (3–3)	Castillo (2–1)	Ramsey (5)	913	22–13	–
April 6	Kentucky		McKethan Stadium	7–6^{10}	Ramsey (2–0)	Hooker (0–2)	None	2,012	23–13	7–6
April 7	Kentucky		McKethan Stadium	10–9	Rojas (3–0)	Wade (2–6)	None	2,738	24–13	8–6
April 8	Kentucky		McKethan Stadium	9–8	Simon (5–3)	Corrado (5–4)	Ramsey (6)	1,947	25–13	9–6
April 11	No. 7 Stetson	No. 23	McKethan Stadium	17-21	DiNardo (7–1)	Simon (5–4)	None	2,315	25–14	–
April 13	at Georgia	No. 23	Foley Field; Athens, GA	4–9	Brown (4–2)	Brice (1–2)	None	2,074	25–15	9–7
April 14	at Georgia	No. 23	Foley Field	3–9	Murphy (5–1)	Ramshaw (3–3)	None	2,642	25–16	9–8
April 15	at Georgia	No. 23	Foley Field	7–6	Rojas (4–0)	Sharpton (3–1)	Ramsey (7)	254	26–16	10–8
April 18	at No. 10 Stetson		Melching Field; DeLand, FL	8–9	Collins (9–0)	Simon (5–5)	None	2,762	26–17	–
April 20	at No. 15 Ole Miss		Swayze Field; Oxford, MS	1–9	Montrenes (8–3)	Brice (1–3)	None	1,912	26–18	10–9
April 21	at No. 15 Ole Miss		Swayze Field	9–12	Yates (6–0)	Rojas (4–1)	None	3,071	26–19	10–10
April 22	at No. 15 Ole Miss		Swayze Field	0–4	Gray (3–1)	Hart (2–2)	Bradshaw (1)	2,911	26–20	10–11
April 24	Canada (JR national team) (exh.)		McKethan Stadium	23–5	Belflower	Grimes	None	222	–	–
April 27	No. 18 Mississippi State		McKethan Stadium	11–4	Brice (2–3)	Maholm (5–3)	None	1,669	27–20	11–11
April 28	No. 18 Mississippi State		McKethan Stadium	4–2^{10}	Ramsey (4–2)	Medders (5–2)	None	1,972	28–20	12–11
April 29	No. 18 Mississippi State		McKethan Stadium	6–5^{14}	Simon (6–5)	Wooten (3–4)	None	1,522	29–20	13–11

May

Date	Opponent	Rank	Stadium Site	Score	Win	Loss	Save	Attendance	Overall Record	SEC Record
May 4	at Auburn		Plainsman Park; Auburn, AL	2–5	Speigner (8–1)	Brice (2–4)	Brandon (4)	3,192	29–21	13–12
May 5	at Auburn		Plainsman Park	10–6	Ramshaw (4–3)	Paxton (4–3)	Ramsey (8)	3,174	30–21	14–12
May 6	at Auburn		Plainsman Park	5–2	Hart (3–2)	Dueitt (3–3)	Belflower (1)	3,044	31–21	15–12
May 9	South Florida	No. 30	McKethan Stadium	5–4	Simon (7–5)	Royal (3–5)	Belflower (2)	914	32–21	–
May 11	No. 21 South Carolina	No. 30	McKethan Stadium	3–6	Bouknight (9–2)	Brice (2–5)	Gronkiewicz (14)	2,077	32–22	15–13
May 12	No. 21 South Carolina	No. 30	McKethan Stadium	14–7	Ramshaw (5–3)	Bell (10–5)	None	1,944	33–22	16–13
May 13	No. 21 South Carolina	No. 30	McKethan Stadium	4–6	Price (5–0)	Ramsey (4–3)	Gronkiewicz (15)	1,608	33–23	16–14

Postseason
SEC Tournament

Date	Opponent	Seed/Rank	Stadium Site	Score	Win	Loss	Save	Attendance	Overall Record	SECT Record
May 16	vs. (2) No. 11 LSU	(7)	Metropolitan Stadium; Hoover, AL	0–10	Scobie (4–1)	Brice (2–6)	None	3,522	33–24	0–1
May 17	vs. (3) No. 17 Tennessee	(7)	Metropolitan Stadium	9–3	Belflower (4–3)	Johnson (3–1)	Ramsey (9)	–	34–24	1–1
May 18	vs. (6) No. 23 Ole Miss	(7)	Metropolitan Stadium	6–7	Bradshaw (4–1)	Hart (3–3)	Morris (9)	–	34–25	1–2

NCAA tournament: Coral Gables Regional

Date	Opponent	Rank	Stadium Site	Score	Win	Loss	Save	Attendance	Overall Record	Regional Record
May 25	vs. (3) Stetson	(2)	Mark Light Stadium	10–9	Belflower (5–3)	Collins (10–3)	None	–	35–25	1–0
May 26 (1)	at (1) No. 1 Miami (FL); Rivalry	(2)	Mark Light Stadium	2–6	Farmer (13–2)	Hart (3–4)	None	4,850	35–26	1–1
May 26 (2)	vs. (3) Stetson	(2)	Mark Light Stadium	3–6	Lincoln (6–0)	Simon (7–6)	Wilson (10)	5,155	35–27	1–2

Rankings from Collegiate Baseball. All times Eastern. Retrieved from FloridaGators.com

== See also ==
- Florida Gators
- List of Florida Gators baseball players
