= 2001 Stanford Cardinal baseball team =

American college baseball season

2001 Stanford Cardinal baseball

Palo Alto Regional champion Palo Alto Super Regional champion

College World Series, 2nd
- Conference: Pacific-10 Conference

Ranking
- Coaches: No. 2
- CB: No. 2
- Record: 51–17 (17–7 Pac-10)
- Head coach: Mark Marquess (25th season)
- Home stadium: Sunken Diamond

2001 Pacific-10 Conference baseball standings
	Conf.						Overall
Team	W		L		T	PCT	W		L		T	PCT
No. 5 Southern California ‍†‍‍	18	–	6	–	0	.750	45	–	19	–	0	.703
No. 2 Stanford ‍‍‍^{y}	17	–	7	–	0	.708	51	–	17	–	0	.750
No. 23 Arizona State ‍‍‍^{y}	14	–	10	–	0	.583	37	–	20	–	1	.647
California ‍‍‍^{y}	14	–	10	–	0	.583	34	–	25	–	0	.576
Arizona ‍‍‍	12	–	12	–	0	.500	33	–	23	–	0	.589
Oregon State ‍‍‍	11	–	13	–	0	.458	31	–	24	–	0	.564
UCLA ‍‍‍	9	–	15	–	0	.375	30	–	27	–	0	.526
Washington ‍‍‍	7	–	17	–	0	.292	29	–	23	–	0	.558
Washington State ‍‍‍	6	–	18	–	0	.250	15	–	39	–	0	.278
† – Conference champion y – Invited to the NCAA tournament As of June 30, 2001; Rankings from Collegiate Baseball

The 2001 Stanford Cardinal baseball team represented Stanford University in the 2001 NCAA Division I baseball season. The Cardinal played their home games at Sunken Diamond in Palo Alto, California. The team was coached by Mark Marquess in his twenty-fifth season as head coach at Stanford.

The Cardinal reached the College World Series, finishing as the runner up to Miami.

== Roster ==
2001 Stanford Cardinal roster
Pitchers: 11 - Mike Gosling - Junior; 15 - John Hudgins - Freshman; 16 - Mike O'Banion - Freshman; 19 - David O'Hagan - Freshman; 20 - Ryan McCally - Sophomore; 23 - Ryan Gloger - Sophomore; 25 - Dan Rich - Junior; 27 - Tim Cunningham - Sophomore; 28 - Jeremy Guthrie - Sophomore; 29 - J. D. Willcox - Junior; 30 - Mike Wodnicki - Junior; 37 - Jeff Bruksch - Junior; 38 - Drew Ehrlich - Freshman; 40 - Jason Luker - Junior	Infielders: 1 - Chris O'Riordan - Junior; 2 - Arik VanZandt - Junior; 4 - Jonny Ash - Freshman; 6 - Tobin Swope - Sophomore; 8 - Scott Dragicevich - Junior; 10 - Matt Lottich - Freshman; 21 - Andy Topham - Junior; 22 - Steve Gantenbein - Junior; Catchers: 7 - Mario Garza - Sophomore; 12 - Ryan Garko - Sophomore; 13 - Ken Tirpack - Sophomore	Outfielders: 3 - Brian Hall - Freshman; 5 - Sam Fuld - Freshman; 17 - Jason VanMeetren - Junior; 18 - Jason Cooper - Sophomore; 24 - Carlos Quentin - Freshman; 26 - Darin Naatjes - Junior

== Schedule ==
Legend
Stanford win
Stanford loss

2001 Stanford Cardinal baseball game log (51–17)
Regular season (42–14)

January (2–2)
Date	Opponent	Rank	Site/stadium	Score	Win	Loss	Save	Attendance	Overall record	Pac-10 record
Jan 21	at Cal Poly*	No. 11	Robin Baggett Stadium • San Luis Obispo, CA	L 5–6^{12}	Choate (1–0)	Hudgins (0–1)	None	3,110	0–1	
Jan 26	at Fresno State*	No. 11	Pete Beiden Field • Fresno, CA	W 11–9	Wodnicki (1–0)	Hintz (0–1)	Hudgins (1)	2,061	1–1	
Jan 27	at Fresno State*	No. 11	Pete Beiden Field • Fresno, CA	L 2–3^{10}	Nieves (1–0)	McCally (0–1)	None	2,141	1–2	
Jan 28	at Fresno State*	No. 11	Pete Beiden Field • Fresno, CA	W 9–5	Cunningham (1–0)	Moran (0–1)	Hudgins (2)	1,574	2–2	

February (11–2)
Date	Opponent	Rank	Site/stadium	Score	Win	Loss	Save	Attendance	Overall record	Pac-10 record
Feb 2	at No. 12 Cal State Fullerton*	No. 11	Goodwin Field • Fullerton, CA	L 4–5	Cordero (1–0)	Hudgins (0–2)	None	2,002	2–3	
Feb 3	at No. 12 Cal State Fullerton*	No. 11	Goodwin Field • Fullerton, CA	W 9–8	McCally (1–1)	Cordero (1–1)	Luker (1)	1,594	3–3	
Feb 4	at No. 12 Cal State Fullerton*	No. 11	Goodwin Field • Fullerton, CA	W 3–0	Cunningham (2–0)	Saarloos (0–2)	Wodnicki (1)	2,051	4–3	
Feb 9	No. 8 Florida State*	No. 12	Sunken Diamond • Stanford, CA	W 6–2	Guthrie (1–0)	Varnes (1–1)	None	1,325	5–3	
Feb 10	No. 8 Florida State	No. 12	Sunken Diamond • Stanford, CA	W 5–2	Bruksch (1–0)	Lynch (0–1)	Hudgins (3)	1,736	6–3	
Feb 11	No. 8 Florida State	No. 12	Sunken Diamond • Stanford, CA	W 8–2	Cunningham (3–0)	Read (1–1)	None	1,817	7–3	
Feb 16	at Texas*	No. 10	Disch–Falk Field • Austin, TX	W 9–6	Guthrie (2–0)	Clark (0–2)	Hudgins (4)	4,015	8–3	
Feb 17	at Texas*	No. 10	Disch–Falk Field • Austin, TX	W 5–0	Bruksch (2–0)	Simpson (0–2)	None	4,476	9–3	
Feb 18	at Texas*	No. 10	Disch–Falk Field • Austin, TX	L 1–2	Montes (2–0)	Hudgins (0–3)	None	4,546	9–4	
Feb 23	at Santa Clara*	No. 9	Buck Shaw Stadium • Santa Clara, CA	W 7–3	Guthrie (3–0)	Travis (0–4)	Wodnicki (2)	397	10–4	
Feb 25	Santa Clara*	No. 9	Sunken Diamond • Stanford, CA	W 8–0	Bruksch (3–0)	Redmond (1–2)	None	1,732	11–4	
Feb 26	at Santa Clara*	No. 9	Buck Shaw Stadium • Santa Clara, CA	W 6–1	Cunningham (4–0)	Diefenderfer (1–2)	McCally (1)	243	12–4	
Feb 27	Nevada*	No. 9	Sunken Diamond • Stanford, CA	W 8–6	Hudgins (1–3)	Moran (0–3)	Willcox (1)	1,649	13–4	

March (11–1)
Date	Opponent	Rank	Site/stadium	Score	Win	Loss	Save	Attendance	Overall record	Pac-10 record
Mar 2	California*	No. 9	Sunken Diamond • Stanford, CA	W 3–1	Guthrie (4–0)	Hutchinson (2–2)	Wodnicki (2)	1,739	14–4	
Mar 3	California*	No. 9	Sunken Diamond • Stanford, CA	L 2–3	Cash (4–1)	Wodnicki (1–1)	Brown (2)	1,945	14–5	
Mar 7	California*	No. 9	Sunken Diamond • Stanford, CA	W 3–2^{10}	Willcox (1–0)	Brown (1–2)	None	1,640	15–5	
Mar 9	No. 4 Southern California*	No. 9	Sunken Diamond • Stanford, CA	W 2–0	Guthrie (5–0)	Prior (4–1)	None	2,067	16–5	
Mar 10	No. 4 Southern California*	No. 9	Sunken Diamond • Stanford, CA	W 15–3	Bruksch (4–0)	Currier (4–1)	None	2,464	17–5	
Mar 11	No. 4 Southern California*	No. 9	Sunken Diamond • Stanford, CA	W 9–5	Willcox (2–0)	Bannister (1–3)	None	2,973	18–5	
Mar 23	Washington	No. 2	Sunken Diamond • Stanford, CA	W 9–3	Guthrie (6–0)	Shepple (0–3)	None	1,946	19–5	1–0
Mar 24	Washington	No. 2	Sunken Diamond • Stanford, CA	W 9–0	Bruksch (5–0)	Johnson (3–1)	None	1,835	20–5	2–0
Mar 25	Washington	No. 2	Sunken Diamond • Stanford, CA	W 13–4	Gosling (1–0)	Carleson (1–1)	None	2,487	21–5	3–0
Mar 27	at Saint Mary's*	No. 1	Louis Guisto Field • Moraga, CA	W 8–3	Luker (1–0)	Byer (2–3)	None	1,765	22–5	
Mar 30	at No. 4 Arizona State	No. 1	Packard Stadium • Tempe, AZ	W 6–2	Guthrie (7–0)	Esposito (1–2)	McCally (2)	3,871	23–5	4–0
Mar 31	at No. 4 Arizona State	No. 1	Packard Stadium • Tempe, AZ	W 5–2	Bruksch (6–0)	Switzer (4–1)	Wodnicki (4)	2,869	24–5	5–0

April (10–7)
Date	Opponent	Rank	Site/stadium	Score	Win	Loss	Save	Attendance	Overall record	Pac-10 record
Apr 1	at No. 4 Arizona State	No. 1	Packard Stadium • Tempe, AZ	L 5–6	Torres (8–3)	Hudgins (1–4)	Friedberg (1)	3,284	24–6	5–1
Apr 3	at San Jose State*	No. 2	San Jose Municipal Stadium • San Jose, CA	W 5–3	Wodnicki (2–1)	Rogelstad (2–3)	None	525	25–6	
Apr 7	UCLA	No. 2	Sunken Diamond • Stanford, CA	L 4–6	Karp (3–0)	Guthrie (7–1)	Silva (2)	2,159	25–7	5–2
Apr 7	UCLA	No. 2	Sunken Diamond • Stanford, CA	W 9–0	Bruksch (7–0)	Brandt (3–3)	None	1,715	26–7	6–2
Apr 8	UCLA	No. 2	Sunken Diamond • Stanford, CA	W 11–2	Gosling (2–0)	Clark (2–1)	None	2,611	27–7	7–2
Apr 10	at Nevada*	No. 1	William Peccole Park • Reno, NV	W 18–13	Wodnicki (3–1)	Norris (0–1)	None	1,272	28–7	
Apr 12	Oregon State	No. 1	Sunken Diamond • Stanford, CA	W 4–1	Guthrie (8–1)	Johnson (4–5)	Willcox (2)	1,815	29–7	8–2
Apr 13	Oregon State	No. 1	Sunken Diamond • Stanford, CA	W 8–1	Bruksch (8–0)	Nicholson (7–2)	None	1,970	30–7	9–2
Apr 14	Oregon State	No. 1	Sunken Diamond • Stanford, CA	W 22–5	Gosling (3–0)	McLemore (0–4)	None	2,627	31–7	10–2
Apr 17	San Francisco*	No. 1	Sunken Diamond • Stanford, CA	L 4–5	Seccombe (3–2)	Hudgins (1–5)	Foppert (1)	2,249	31–8	
Apr 20	at No. 7 Southern California	No. 1	Dedeaux Field • Los Angeles, CA	L 1–2	Prior (11–1)	Guthrie (8–2)	None	1,176	31–9	10–3
Apr 21	at No. 7 Southern California	No. 1	Dedeaux Field • Los Angeles, CA	L 0–7	Currier (8–1)	Bruksch (8–1)	None	1,232	31–10	10–4
Apr 22	at No. 7 Southern California	No. 1	Dedeaux Field • Los Angeles, CA	W 9–5	Gosling (4–0)	Reyes (1–3)	None	1,333	32–10	11–4
Apr 24	San Jose State*	No. 2	Sunken Diamond • Stanford, CA	W 4–3	Wodnicki (4–1)	Malott (2–1)	Willcox (3)	1,957	33–10	
Apr 27	at California	No. 2	Evans Diamond • Berkeley, CA	L 4–7	Hutchinson (4–6)	Guthrie (8–3)	None	525	33–11	11–5
Apr 28	at California	No. 2	Evans Diamond • Berkeley, CA	L 0–4	Dennis (4–3)	Bruksch (8–2)	Brown (8)	912	33–12	11–6
Apr 29	at California	No. 2	Evans Diamond • Berkeley, CA	W 8–0	Gosling (5–0)	Cash (8–3)	None	2,413	34–12	12–6

May (8–2)
Date	Opponent	Rank	Site/stadium	Score	Win	Loss	Save	Attendance	Overall record	Pac-10 record
May 1	Santa Clara*	No. 6	Sunken Diamond • Stanford, CA	W 15–8	McCally (2–1)	Ampi (0–3)	None	2,099	35–12	
May 2	at Sacramento State*	No. 6	John Smith Field • Sacramento, CA	L 3–12	Groeger (5–7)	Guthrie (8–4)	None	2,460	35–13	
May 8	Cal Poly*	No. 6	Sunken Diamond • Stanford, CA	W 11–10	Willcox (3–0)	Choate (4–2)	None	2,062	36–13	
May 9	at San Francisco*	No. 6	Benedetti Diamond • San Francisco, CA	W 8–6	Cunningham (5–0)	Gossert (4–2)	McCally (3)	530	37–13	
May 11	Arizona	No. 6	Sunken Diamond • Stanford, CA	W 6–5	Guthrie (9–4)	Kaiser (7–6)	Willcox (4)	4,458	38–13	13–6
May 12	Arizona	No. 6	Sunken Diamond • Stanford, CA	L 4–5	Rierson (6–4)	Bruksch (8–3)	Anderson (2)	2,916	38–14	13–7
May 13	Arizona	No. 6	Sunken Diamond • Stanford, CA	W 8–2	Gosling (6–0)	Goodman (3–2)	None	3,763	39–14	14–7
May 18	at Washington State	No. 4	Bailey–Brayton Field • Pullman, WA	W 14–6	Guthrie (10–3)	Alwert (2–6)	Wodnicki (5)	381	40–14	15–7
May 19	at Washington State	No. 4	Bailey–Brayton Field • Pullman, WA	W 19–3	Bruksch (9–3)	Svendsen (2–3)	None	423	41–14	16–7
May 20	at Washington State	No. 4	Bailey–Brayton Field • Pullman, WA	W 12–1	Gosling (7–0)	Fisher (0–7)	None	425	42–14	17–7

Postseason (9–3)

NCAA Palo Alto Regional (4–1)
Date	Opponent	Rank	Site/stadium	Score	Win	Loss	Save	Attendance	Overall record	Regional Record
May 25	(4) Marist	(1) No. 4	Sunken Diamond • Stanford, CA	W 4–3	Guthrie (11–4)	Tracz (10–1)	Wodnicki (6)	3,043	43–14	1–0
May 26	(3) Texas	(1) No. 4	Sunken Diamond • Stanford, CA	L 3–4	Montes (7–5)	Gosling (7–1)	Jordan (3)	3,346	43–15	1–1
May 26	(4) Marist	(1) No. 4	Sunken Diamond • Stanford, CA	W 6–0	Cunningham (6–0)	Kondratowicz (4–2)	None	1,786	44–15	2–1
May 27	(3) Texas	(1) No. 4	Sunken Diamond • Stanford, CA	W 10–9^{10}	Willcox (4–0)	Montes (7–6)	None	2,515	45–15	3–1
May 27	(3) Texas	(1) No. 4	Sunken Diamond • Stanford, CA	W 4–3	Wodnicki (5–1)	Clark (3–4)	Willcox (5)	2,143	46–15	4–1

NCAA Palo Alto Super Regional (2–1)
Date	Opponent	Rank	Site/stadium	Score	Win	Loss	Save	Attendance	Overall record	SR Record
June 1	No. 15 South Carolina	(4) No. 4	Sunken Diamond • Stanford, CA	W 11–1	Guthrie (12–4)	Bouknight (10–4)	None	3,675	47–15	1–0
June 2	No. 15 South Carolina	(4) No. 4	Sunken Diamond • Stanford, CA	L 3–4	Taylor (5–3)	Gosling (7–2)	Gronkiewicz (19)	3,445	47–16	1–1
June 3	No. 15 South Carolina	(4) No. 4	Sunken Diamond • Stanford, CA	W 3–2	Wodnicki (6–1)	Taylor (5–4)	Willcox (6)	3,505	48–16	2–1

College World Series (3–1)
Date	Opponent	Rank	Site/stadium	Score	Win	Loss	Save	Overall record	CWS record	
June 8	vs. (5) No. 6 Tulane	(4) No. 4	Johnny Rosenblatt Stadium • Omaha, NE	W 13–11	Wodnicki (7–1)	Charron (9–2)	Bruksch (1)		49–16	1–0
June 10	vs. (1) No. 5 Cal State Fullerton	(4) No. 4	Johnny Rosenblatt Stadium • Omaha, NE	W 5–2^{10}	Willcox (5–0)	Cordero (3–4)	Brucksch (2)	23,087	50–16	2–0
June 13	vs. (1) No. 5 Cal State Fullerton	(4) No. 4	Johnny Rosenblatt Stadium • Omaha, NE	W 4–1	Guthrie (13–4)	Smith (11–3)	Bruksch (3)	20,221	51–16	3–0
June 16	vs. (2) No. 1 Miami (FL)	(4) No. 4	Johnny Rosenblatt Stadium • Omaha, NE	L 1–12	Farmer (15–2)	Gosling (7–3)	None	24,070	51–17	3–1
