= Alex Rodriguez Park at Mark Light Field =

Baseball park at the University of Miami

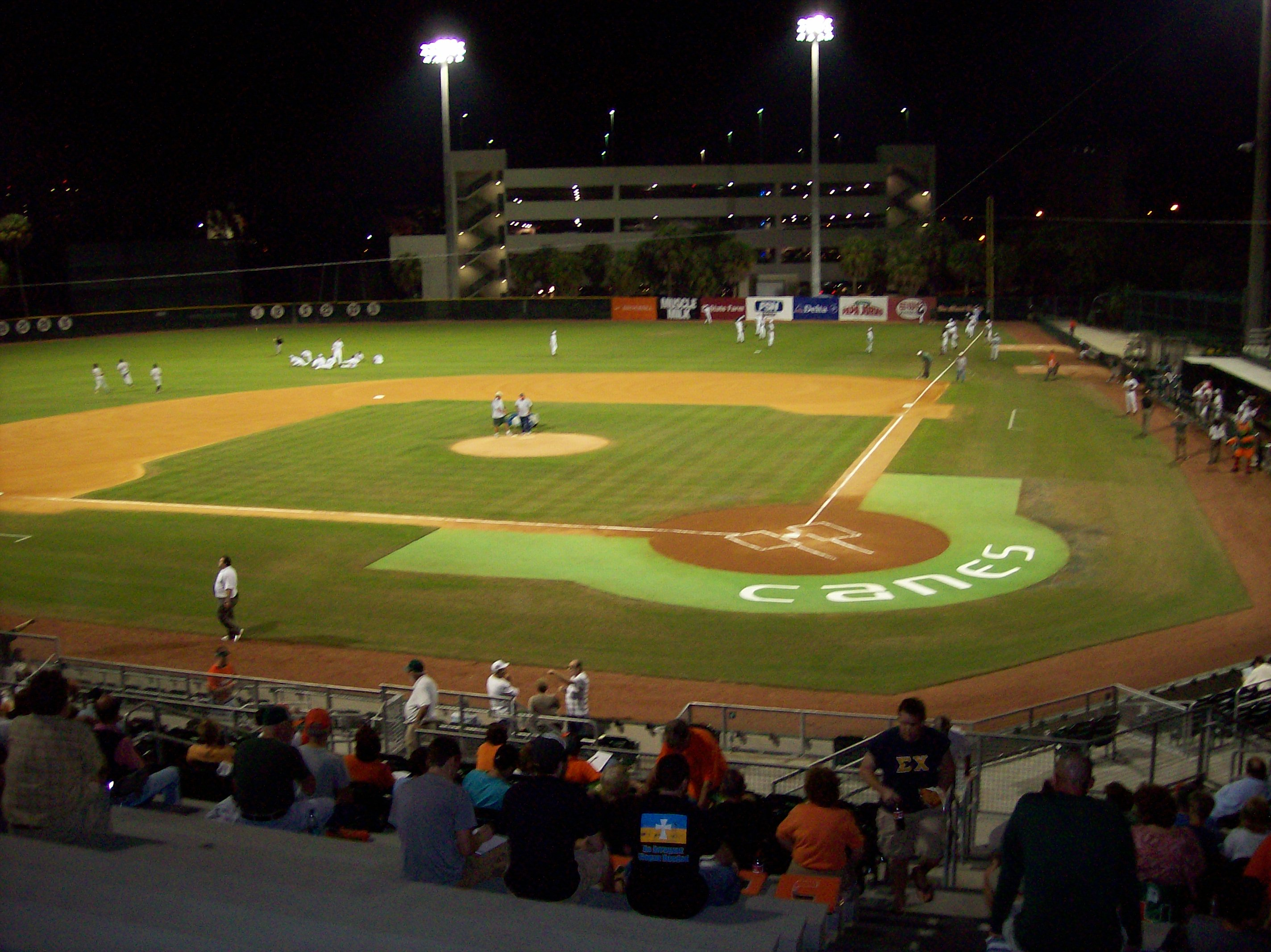
- Alex Rodriguez Park at Mark Light Field on the campus of the University of Miami in Coral Gables, Florida, February 2007
- Interactive map of Alex Rodriguez Park at Mark Light Field
- Former names: Mark Light Field (1973–2009)
- Location: Coral Gables, Florida, U.S.
- Coordinates: 25°42′42″N 80°16′56″W
- Owner: University of Miami
- Operator: University of Miami
- Capacity: 5,000
- Surface: Natural grass
- Scoreboard: Electronic
- Field size: Left Field - 330 ft (100.5 m); Left-Center - 365 ft (111 m); Center Field - 400 ft (122 m); Right-Center - 365 ft (111 m); Right Field - 330 ft (100.5m)

Construction
- Built: 1972–1973
- Opened: February 16, 1973
- Renovated: 1974, 1996, 2007–2009
- Architect: Suburban

Tenant
- Miami Hurricanes (NCAA) (1973–present)

Website
- Official website

Alex Rodriguez Park at Mark Light Field is home field for the Miami Hurricanes baseball team at the University of Miami in Coral Gables, Florida. The stadium holds a capacity of 5,000 spectators and is located on the University of Miami's campus in Coral Gables. The first game on the field was held on February 16, 1973.

The field is named for Mark Light, whose father, University of Miami fan George Light, donated money for its construction. Mark Light died of muscular dystrophy, and the field was dedicated in his honor in 1977.

The ballpark is bounded by Ponce de Leon Street (southeast, first base); San Amaro Drive (southwest and west, home plate and third base); and other university sports facilities (north and northeast, outfield).

Following a $3.9 million contribution by New York Yankees all-star Alex Rodriguez, the facility was renovated from 2007 to 2009 and renamed.

In 2013, the Hurricanes ranked 26th nationally among Division I baseball programs in attendance, averaging 2,635 per home game.

Since 1973, the University of Miami has been one of college baseball's elite with 25 College World Series appearances, winning four national championships (1982, 1985, 1999, and 2001) and advancing to the NCAA regionals a record 44 consecutive years. Miami has won 29 NCAA Regional Titles, hosted 27 NCAA Regionals, and in each of their four national championship runs they were an NCAA Regional Host.

== See also ==
- List of NCAA Division I baseball venues
