= 2001 NCAA Division I baseball tournament =

- Season: 2001
- Teams: 64
- Finals site: Johnny Rosenblatt Stadium; Omaha, NE
- Champions: Miami (FL) (4th title)
- Runner-up: Stanford (13th CWS Appearance)
- Winning coach: Jim Morris (2nd title)
- MOP: Charlton Jimerson (Miami (FL))

The 2001 NCAA Division I baseball tournament was played at the end of the 2001 NCAA Division I baseball season to determine the national champion of college baseball. The tournament concluded with eight teams competing in the College World Series, a double-elimination tournament in its fifty fifth year. Sixteen regional competitions were held to determine the participants in the final event, with each winner advancing to a best of three series against another regional champion for the right to play in the College World Series. Each region was composed of four teams, resulting in 64 teams participating in the tournament at the conclusion of their regular season, and in some cases, after a conference tournament. The fifty-fifth tournament's champion was Miami (FL), coached by Jim Morris. The Most Outstanding Player was Charlton Jimerson of Miami (FL).

== National seeds ==
Bold indicates CWS participant.

1. **Cal State Fullerton**
2. **Miami (FL)**
3. **Southern California**
4. **Stanford**
5. **Tulane**
6. **Georgia**
7. East Carolina
8. **Nebraska**

== Regionals and super regionals ==
Bold indicates winner. * indicates extra innings. Italics indicates host.

=== Fullerton Super Regional ===
First round	Second round
1	**Cal State Fullerton**	**17**
4	Temple	3
1	**Cal State Fullerton**	**13**
2	Arizona State	3
3	Texas Tech	3
2	**Arizona State**	**12**
Fullerton, CA Regional–Goodwin Field
4	Temple	3
3	**Texas Tech**	**14**
2	Arizona State	8
3	**Texas Tech**	**9**
1	**Mississippi State**	**9**^{10}
4	Kent State	8
1	**Mississippi State**	**4**
3	Delaware	3
3	**Delaware**	**5**^{10}
2	Ohio State	4
Columbus, OH Regional–Bill Davis Stadium
2	Ohio State	8
4	**Kent State**	**9**
3	Delaware	11
4	**Kent State**	**12**

Regional finals
1	**Cal State Fullerton**	5	**9**
3	Texas Tech	**11**	2
1	**Mississippi State**	**14**	–
4	Kent State	4	–

Super regionals
1	**Cal State Fullerton**	**13**	**9**	–
Mississippi State	2	3	–

=== Lincoln Super Regional ===
First round	Second round
1	**Nebraska**	**16**
4	Northern Iowa	6
1	**Nebraska**	**5**
2	Rutgers	4
3	BYU	3
2	**Rutgers**	**4**
Lincoln, Nebraska, Regional–Buck Beltzer Stadium
4	**Northern Iowa**	**10**
3	BYU	1
4	Northern Iowa	4
2	**Rutgers**	**5**
1	**Rice**	**11**
4	Texas–Arlington	4
1	Rice	10
2	**Baylor**	**11**
3	Houston	1
2	**Baylor**	**7**
Houston, Texas, Regional–Reckling Park
4	**Texas-Arlington**	**7**
3	Houston	6
4	Texas-Arlington	2
1	**Rice**	**14**

Regional finals
1	**Nebraska**	**14**	–
2	Rutgers	10	–
2	Baylor	4	4
1	**Rice**	**7**	**5**

Super regionals
8	**Nebraska**	**7**	**9**^{10}	–
Rice	0	6	–

=== Metairie Super Regional ===
First round	Second round
1	**Tulane**	**22**
4	Southern	9
1	**Tulane**	**13**
3	Oklahoma State	10
3	**Oklahoma State**	**5**^{10}
2	Ole Miss	4
New Orleans Regional–Turchin Stadium
4	Southern	2
2	**Ole Miss**	**10**
3	**Oklahoma State**	**16**
2	Ole Miss	7
1	**LSU**	**10**
4	Minnesota	9
1	**LSU**	**13**
2	VCU	9
3	California	7
2	**VCU**	**9**
Baton Rouge Regional–Alex Box Stadium
4	Minnesota	3
3	**California**	**9**
2	**VCU**	**11**
3	California	2

Regional finals
1	**Tulane**	**9**	—
3	Oklahoma State	8	—
1	**LSU**	7	**14**
2	VCU	**10**	9

Super regionals
5	**Tulane**	3	**9**	**7**
LSU	**4**^{13}	4	1

=== Palo Alto Super Regional ===
First round	Second round
1	**Stanford**	**4**
4	Marist	3
1	Stanford	3
3	**Texas**	**4**
3	**Texas**	**11**
2	Long Beach State	2
Palo Alto, California Regional–Sunken Diamond
4	**Marist**	**7**
2	Long Beach State	6
4	Marist	0
1	**Stanford**	**6**
1	**UCF**	**13**^{12}
4	Princeton	12
1	**UCF**	**8**
2	South Carolina	6
3	The Citadel	0
2	**South Carolina**	**16**
Columbia, South Carolina, Regional–Sarge Frye Field
4	**Princeton**	**11**
3	The Citadel	6
4	Princeton	7
2	**South Carolina**	**11**

Regional finals
3	Texas	9	3
1	**Stanford**	**10**^{10}	**4**
1	UCF	7	2
2	**South Carolina**	**9**	**5**

Super regionals
4	**Stanford**	**11**	3	**3**
South Carolina	1	**4**	2

=== Coral Gables Super Regional ===
First round	Second round
1	**Miami (FL)**	**14**
4	Bucknell	6
1	**Miami (FL)**	**6**
2	Florida	2
3	Stetson	9
2	**Florida**	**10**
Coral Gables Regional
4	Bucknell	0
3	**Stetson**	**7**
3	**Stetson**	**6**
2	Florida	3
1	South Alabama	2
4	**Seton Hall**	**7**
4	Seton Hall	4
2	**Clemson**	**24**
3	William & Mary	1
2	**Clemson**	**4**
Clemson Regional
1	**South Alabama**	**8**
3	William & Mary	4
1	South Alabama	7
4	**Seton Hall**	**8**

Regional finals
1	**Miami (FL)**	**16**	—
3	Stetson	8	—
2	**Clemson**	**8**	—
4	Seton Hall	2	—

Super regionals
2	**Miami (FL)**	**10**	**14**	—
Clemson	8	6	—

=== Kinston Super Regional ===
First round	Second round
1	**East Carolina**	**7**
4	UMBC	0
1	**East Carolina**	**12**
3	South Florida	8
3	**South Florida**	**7**
2	Winthrop	2
Wilson Regional
4	UMBC	0
2	**Winthrop**	**6**
2	**Winthrop**	**6**
3	South Florida	1
1	Wake Forest	7
4	**Tennessee Tech**	**9**
4	Tennessee Tech	0
2	**Tennessee**	**11**
3	Middle Tennessee	1
2	**Tennessee**	**2**
Knoxville Regional
1	**Wake Forest**	**6**
3	Middle Tennessee	3
1	**Wake Forest**	**18**
4	Tennessee Tech	5

Regional finals
1	**East Carolina**	**7**	—
2	Winthrop	3	—
2	**Tennessee**	3	**6**
1	Wake Forest	**10**	3

Super regionals
7	East Carolina	10	3	—
**Tennessee**	**13**	**6**	—

=== Athens Super Regional ===
First round	Second round
1	Georgia	3
4	**Georgia Southern**	**4**
4	Georgia Southern	3
3	**Coastal Carolina**	**12**
3	**Coastal Carolina**	**5**
2	Georgia Tech	3
Athens, Georgia, Regional–Foley Field
1	**Georgia**	**13**
2	Georgia Tech	5
1	**Georgia**	**10**^{11}
4	Georgia Southern	9
1	**Florida State**	**8**
4	Bethune-Cookman	1
1	**Florida State**	**10**
2	Auburn	6
3	Jacksonville	7
2	**Auburn**	**8**^{10}
Tallahassee, Florida, Regional–Dick Howser Stadium
4	Bethune-Cookman	0
3	**Jacksonville**	**3**
3	Jacksonville	2
2	**Auburn**	**3**

Regional finals
3	Coastal Carolina	3	7
1	**Georgia**	**9**	**8**
1	**Florida State**	**9**	—
2	Auburn	6	—

Super regionals
6	**Georgia**	**9**^{10}	6	**8**
Florida State	8	**11**	3

=== Los Angeles Super Regional ===
First round	Second round
1	**Southern California**	**12**
4	Oral Roberts	4
1	**Southern California**	**4**
2	Pepperdine	3
3	Fresno State	0
2	**Pepperdine**	**4**
Los Angeles, California Regional–Dedeaux Field
4	Oral Roberts	1
3	**Fresno State**	**2**
3	**Fresno State**	**8**
2	Pepperdine	6
1	**Notre Dame**	**12**
4	Milwaukee	4
1	Notre Dame	6
3	**FIU**	**7**^{10}
3	**FIU**	**17**
2	UC Santa Barbara	4
South Bend, Indiana Regional–Frank Eck Stadium
4	Milwaukee	12
2	**UC Santa Barbara**	**13**
2	UC Santa Barbara	10
1	**Notre Dame**	**11**^{10}

Regional finals
1	**Southern California**	**8**	—
3	Fresno State	0	—
3	**FIU**	2	**5**
1	Notre Dame	**5**	4

Super regionals
3	**Southern California**	**5**	**6**	—
FIU	1	0	—

== College World Series ==
=== Participants ===
School	Conference	Record (conference)	Head coach	CWS appearances	Best CWS finish	CWS record Not including this year
Cal State Fullerton	Big West	46–16 (14–4)	George Horton	10 (last: 1999)	1st (1979, 1984, 1995)	23–16
Georgia	SEC	47–20 (20–10)	Ron Polk	2 (last: 1990)	1st (1990)	4–3
Miami (FL)	n/a	49–12 (n/a)	Jim Morris	18 (last: 1999)	1st (1982, 1985, 1999)	39–30
Nebraska	Big 12	50–14 (20–8)	Dave Van Horn	0 (last: none)	none	0–0
Southern California	Pac-10	44–17 (18–6)	Mike Gillespie	20 (last: 2000)	1st (1948, 1958, 1961, 1963, 1968, 1970, 1971, 1972, 1973, 1974, 1978, 1998)	73–24
Stanford	Pac-10	48–16 (17–7)	Mark Marquess	12 (last: 2000)	1st (1987, 1988)	28–21
Tennessee	SEC	46–18 (18–12)	Rod Delmonico	2 (last: 1995)	2nd (1951)	6–4
Tulane	C-USA	55–11 (21–6)	Rick Jones	0 (last: none)	none	0–0

=== Results ===
==== Bracket ====
First round
5	Tulane	11
4	**Stanford**	**13**
8	Nebraska	4
1	**Cal State Fullerton**	**5**
5	**Tulane**	**6**
8	Nebraska	5
6	Georgia	5
3	**Southern California**	**11**
Tennessee	13
2	**Miami (FL)**	**21**
**Tennessee**	**19**
6	Georgia	12

Second round
4	**Stanford**	**5**^{10}
1	Cal State Fullerton	2
1	**Cal State Fullerton**	**11**
5	Tulane	2
3	Southern California	3
2	**Miami (FL)**	**4**
3	Southern California	2
**Tennessee**	**10**

Semifinals
1	Cal State Fullerton	1	—
4	**Stanford**	**4**	—
2	**Miami (FL)**	**12**	—
Tennessee	6	—

Finals
4	Stanford	1
2	**Miami (FL)**	**12**

==== Game results ====
Date	Game	Winner	Score	Loser	Notes
June 8	Game 1	Stanford	13–11	Tulane	
June 8	Game 2	Cal State Fullerton	5–4	Nebraska	
June 9	Game 3	Southern California	11–5	Georgia	
June 9	Game 4	Miami (FL)	21–13	Tennessee	
June 10	Game 5	Tulane	6–5	Nebraska	Nebraska eliminated
June 10	Game 6	Stanford	5–2 (10)	Cal State Fullerton	
June 11	Game 7	Tennessee	19–12	Georgia	Georgia eliminated
June 11	Game 8	Miami (FL)	4–3	Southern California	
June 12	Game 9	Cal State Fullerton	11–2	Tulane	Tulane eliminated
June 12	Game 10	Tennessee	10–2	Southern California	Southern California eliminated
June 13	Game 11	Stanford	4–1	Cal State Fullerton	Cal State Fullerton eliminated
June 14	Game 12	Miami (FL)	12–6	Tennessee	Tennessee eliminated
June 16	Final	Miami (FL)	12–1	Stanford	Miami (FL) wins CWS

=== All-Tournament Team ===
The following players were members of the College World Series All-Tournament Team.

Position	Player	School
P	Jeff Bruksch	Stanford
P	Tom Farmer	Miami (FL)
C	Ryan Garko	Stanford
1B	Kevin Brown	Miami (FL)
2B	David Bacani	Cal State Fullerton
3B	Charlie Fod	Georgia
SS	Chris Burke	Tennessee
OF	Jeff Christensen	Tennessee
OF	Sam Fuld	Stanford
OF	**Charlton Jimerson (MOP)**	Miami (FL)
DH	Danny Matienzo	Miami (FL)

=== Notable players ===
- Cal State Fullerton: Chad Cordero, Kirk Saarloos
- Georgia: Jeff Keppinger, Charlie Ford
- Miami (FL): Charlton Jimerson
- Nebraska:
- Southern California: Mark Prior
- Stanford: Ryan Garko, Sam Fuld
- Tennessee: Chris Burke
- Tulane: Andy Cannizaro

== See also ==
- 2001 NCAA Division II baseball tournament
- 2001 NCAA Division III baseball tournament
- 2001 NAIA World Series
