= Charlton Jimerson =

American baseball player (born 1979)

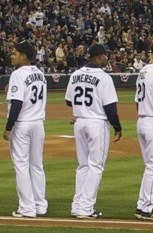
- Jimerson (center) with the Mariners in 2008
- Outfielder
- Born: September 22, 1979 (age 47); San Leandro, California, U.S.
- Batted: Right Threw: Right

MLB debut
- September 14, 2005, for the Houston Astros

Last MLB appearance
- April 10, 2008, for the Seattle Mariners

MLB statistics
- Batting average: .444
- Home runs: 2
- Runs batted in: 2
- Stats at Baseball Reference

Teams
- Houston Astros (2005–2006); Seattle Mariners (2007–2008)

Career highlights and awards
- Most Outstanding Player, 2001 College World Series; Hit a home run in first major league at-bat

Charlton Maxwell Jimerson (born September 22, 1979) is an American former Major League Baseball (MLB) outfielder. He played in MLB for the Houston Astros and Seattle Mariners. He played college baseball at the University of Miami, where he was named the Most Outstanding Player in the 2001 College World Series

== Early life ==
Growing up in Hayward, California, Jimerson endured a turbulent childhood. His mother was addicted to crack cocaine, and she often abandoned Charlton and his younger brother Terrance while searching for drugs. His father had moved out and abandoned the family while Jimerson was young, becoming homeless, and before that time had been physically abusive of Charlton's mother. The family was supported largely by Jimerson's sister Lanette, who worked multiple jobs simultaneously to provide financial support. Lanette also helped the oldest of the five children, Derrell, sue for custody of Charlton and Terrance when Charlton was 15.

=== University of Miami ===
After Jimerson graduated from Mt. Eden High School, he was chosen by the Astros in the 24th round of the 1997 June draft, with the 760th overall pick. Jimerson did not feel that he was ready for a professional career, however, and he instead chose to attend the University of Miami on a partial academic scholarship.

Jimerson earned a spot on the University of Miami's baseball team as a walk-on, although he had not been widely recruited in high school. Coach Jim Morris initially tried to convince him to transfer to a junior college, but Jimerson used a homemade portfolio of clippings and a personal essay to impress the coach with his motivation. He was a bench player his first three years, and he did not play during Miami's successful pursuit of the 1999 College World Series title. In 1999, he played for the Bethesda Big Train, a college wooden bat summer team.

In his senior year in 2001, an injury to a teammate opened a spot for Jimerson in Miami's starting lineup. He took advantage of the opportunity, ultimately being honored as the Most Outstanding Player in the 2001 College World Series, as Miami won its second title in three years. He tied a CWS record by stealing four bases in a game against Tennessee. His teammates awarded him the Bob Werner Memorial Award, for exhibiting the qualities of a winner.

== Professional career ==
=== Houston Astros ===
After drafting him out of high school, the Houston Astros again selected him in the draft, in the fifth round with the 146th overall pick of the 2001 Major League Baseball draft. He received a $90,000 signing bonus.

Jimerson was regarded as having very good physical tools, with some scouts comparing his abilities to a young Eric Davis. Baseball America cited him as being the "Best Athlete" and having the "Best Outfield Arm" in Houston's farm system in 2005, though he never ranked among the team's top 10 prospects. He has stolen more than 25 bases in each of his four years in professional baseball. He had trouble maintaining his batting average, however, hitting only .245 through his first four years. He also struck out frequently, with 152 strikeouts in 2005 and 163 in 2004. After playing for the Scottsdale Scorpions in the 2004 Arizona Fall League, Jimerson received some coaching from Hall of Famer Tony Gwynn to fix a hole in his swing.

Jimerson made his major league debut on September 14, 2005, appearing as a defensive replacement in a 10–2 win against the Florida Marlins. He did not record an out nor did he make a plate appearance in the game and played no more games for the Astros that year. After spending most of 2006 in Triple-A, Jimerson was called up again after rosters expanded in September. When he pinch-hit for Roger Clemens in the sixth inning on September 4, he hit a home run in his first major league at-bat, breaking up a perfect game by Cole Hamels of the Philadelphia Phillies.

The Astros released Jimerson on March 28, 2007, four days after he was outrighted to the Double-A Corpus Christi Hooks. General manager Tim Purpura said Jimerson had requested a trade or his release.

=== Seattle Mariners ===
The Seattle Mariners signed Jimerson to a minor league contract on May 8, 2007, and sent Jimerson to Double-A West Tenn Diamond Jaxx. In his first two months in West Tennessee, Jimerson continued to exhibit a low batting average and a high strikeout rate but increased his power. In his first 244 plate appearances, he hit 16 home runs and slugged .552. After the Mariners traded Sebastien Boucher and a player to be named later or cash to the Baltimore Orioles for pitcher John Parrish on August 9, Jimerson was promoted to Triple-A Tacoma. He was promoted to the Mariners in September, appearing in 11 games, primarily as a pinch runner. On September 16, he hit his final MLB hit, a home run against the Tampa Bay Devil Rays.

Jimerson made the Mariners 2008 Opening Day roster as a backup outfielder. After playing in two games, scoring as a pinch runner and grounding into a double play after coming on as a defensive replacement, he was designated for assignment on April 11 to make room for Greg Norton on the roster. Jimerson said he was shocked by the move. On April 16, Jimerson was assigned to Triple-A Tacoma, but the Mariners released him on July 13.

=== Sioux City Explorers ===
Jimerson signed with the Sioux City Explorers of the American Association on August 4, 2008 but was released from the Explorers 11 days later on August 15. In 8 games, he had 3 hits and 16 strikeouts in 32 plate appearances.

=== Newark Bears ===
Jimerson played for the Newark Bears of the independent Atlantic League in 2009. He had a .335 batting average, 21 home runs, and 38 stolen bases, ranking in the top seven in the league in each statistic.

=== Minnesota Twins ===
Jimerson signed a minor league contract with the Minnesota Twins in February 2010 and was assigned to the Rochester Red Wings. Despite hitting well in spring training, he was released by the Twins before playing in a minor league game.

=== Bridgeport Bluefish ===
Jimerson returned to the Atlantic League, joining the Bridgeport Bluefish in 2010. He played in the league's All-Star game. In 48 games to begin the season, he hit .346 with 10 home runs and 12 stolen bases.

=== Los Angeles Angels of Anaheim ===
The Los Angeles Angels of Anaheim purchased Jimerson's contract from Bridgeport on July 19, 2010. He was assigned to the Double-A Arkansas Travelers. In the final 43 games of his playing career, he hit .229 with 7 home runs, 7 stolen bases, and only 7 walks in 176 plate appearances. He elected free agency after the season.

== Personal life ==
Jimerson and his wife Candace live in Missouri City, Texas with their two children. Jimerson also has two children from his first marriage.

After his playing career ended, Jimerson earned his bachelor's degree in computer science and mathematics from University of Miami. He began working as a technology consultant in Houston. Jimerson had studied computer science at Miami.

=== Against All Odds: A Success Story ===
In 2015, Jimerson released a memoir, Against All Odds: A Success Story. The book is organized into "innings" rather than chapters. In the book, he tells the story of his childhood where he was raised in a family of five kids along with a mother who struggled with drug dependency and often suffered drug-related violence. He describes his growing love of baseball, sharing how both school and sports offered him positive ways forward. The book was independently published on Createspace.
