= Dedeaux Field =

College baseball stadium in California, US

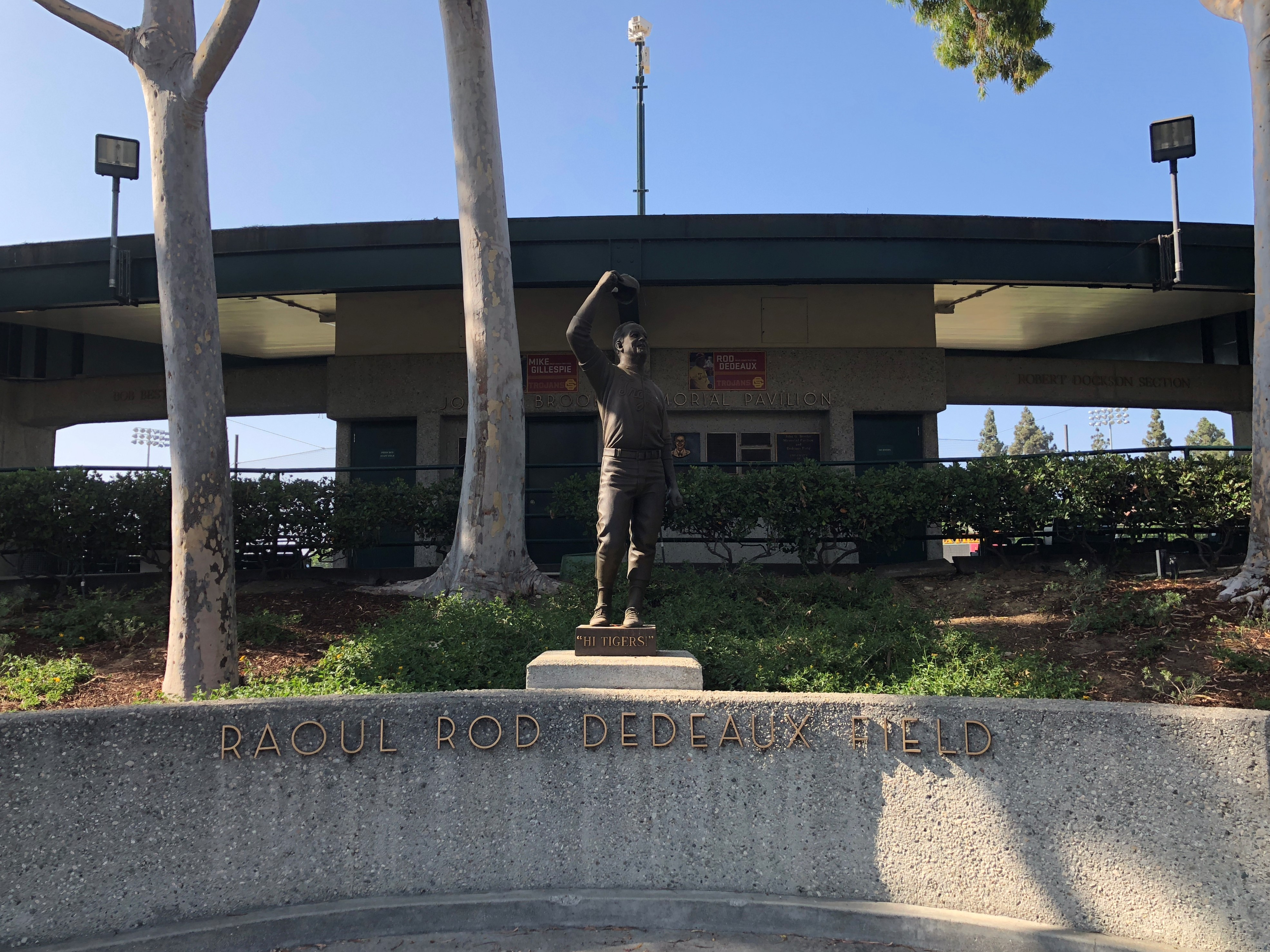
- Interactive map of Dedeaux Field
- Location: University of Southern California; Los Angeles, California, U.S.
- Coordinates: 34.0235°N 118.2898°W
- Owner: University of Southern California
- Capacity: 2,500
- Surface: Natural grass
- Field size: Foul lines: 335 ft (102 m); Left alley: 375 ft (114 m); Right alley: 365 ft (111 m); Center field: 395 ft (120 m); Outfield fence height: 10 ft (3.0 m)
- Public transit: Expo/Vermont

Construction
- Opened: March 30, 1974

Tenant
- USC Trojans baseball (NCAA)

Dedeaux Field (the United States)

Dedeaux Field is a college baseball stadium in Los Angeles, California, U.S., on the west end of the campus of the University of Southern California. The home field of the USC Trojans of the Big Ten Conference, it has a seating capacity of 2,500.

The current stadium opened in 1974, the year USC won its record fifth consecutive College World Series title, the sixth in seven years. It is named after longtime head coach Rod Dedeaux (1914–2006), who led the Trojans from 1942 until his retirement at age 72 in June 1986. The elevation of the playing field is about 175 feet (53 m) above sea level.

The previous venue was Bovard Field, which was about 500 yards (460 m) to the southeast. Bovard's home plate was located in today's E.F. Hutton Park and a large eucalyptus tree guarded the right field line.

The stadium is currently undergoing reconstruction as part of a university athletics facility project. The current north-facing orientation of the ballpark will be changed to face eastward when the new facility opens.

== Tournaments hosted ==
NCAA Regional Tournaments (7): 1974, 1975, 1978, 1991, 1999, 2001, 2002
NCAA Super Regional Series (1): 2001
PAC-8 Playoffs (2): 1974, 1977
PAC-10 Playoffs (2): 1995, 1996

== USC record at Dedeaux Field (2004–2009) ==
Year	Games	W–L–T	Win Percentage
2004	26	12–14–0	.462
2005	25	20–5–0	.800
2006	32	16–16–0	.500
2007	28	12–16–0	.429
2008	25	13–12–0	.520
2009	33	18–15–0	.545
Totals

== Gallery ==
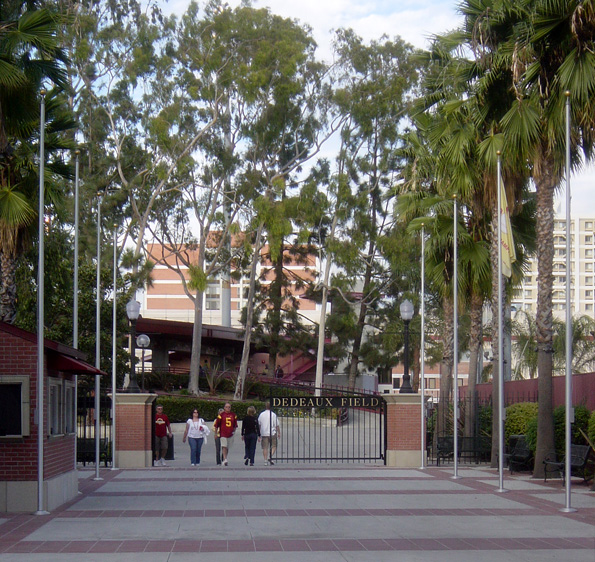
Dedeaux Field entrance

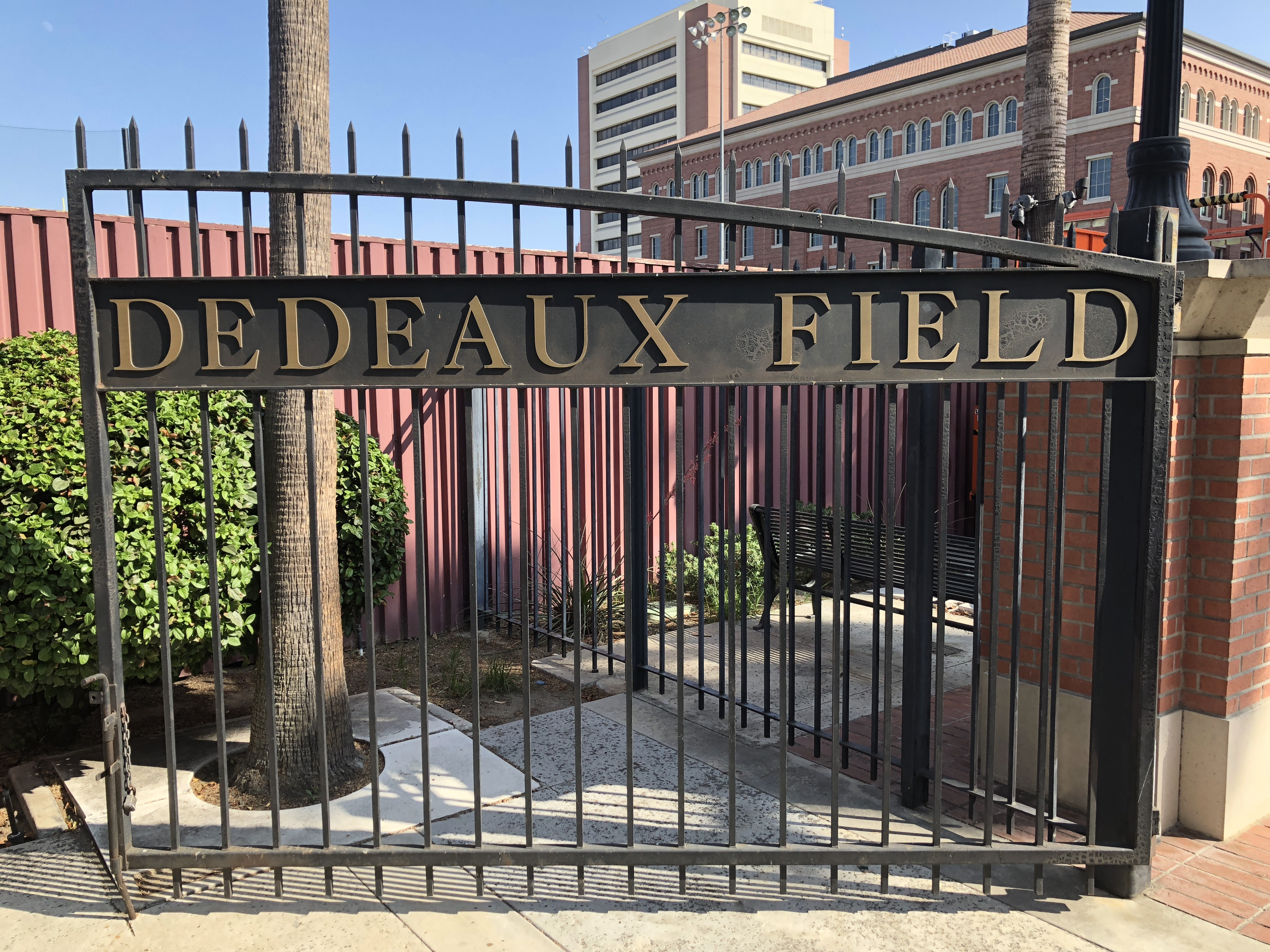
Dedeaux Field main gate

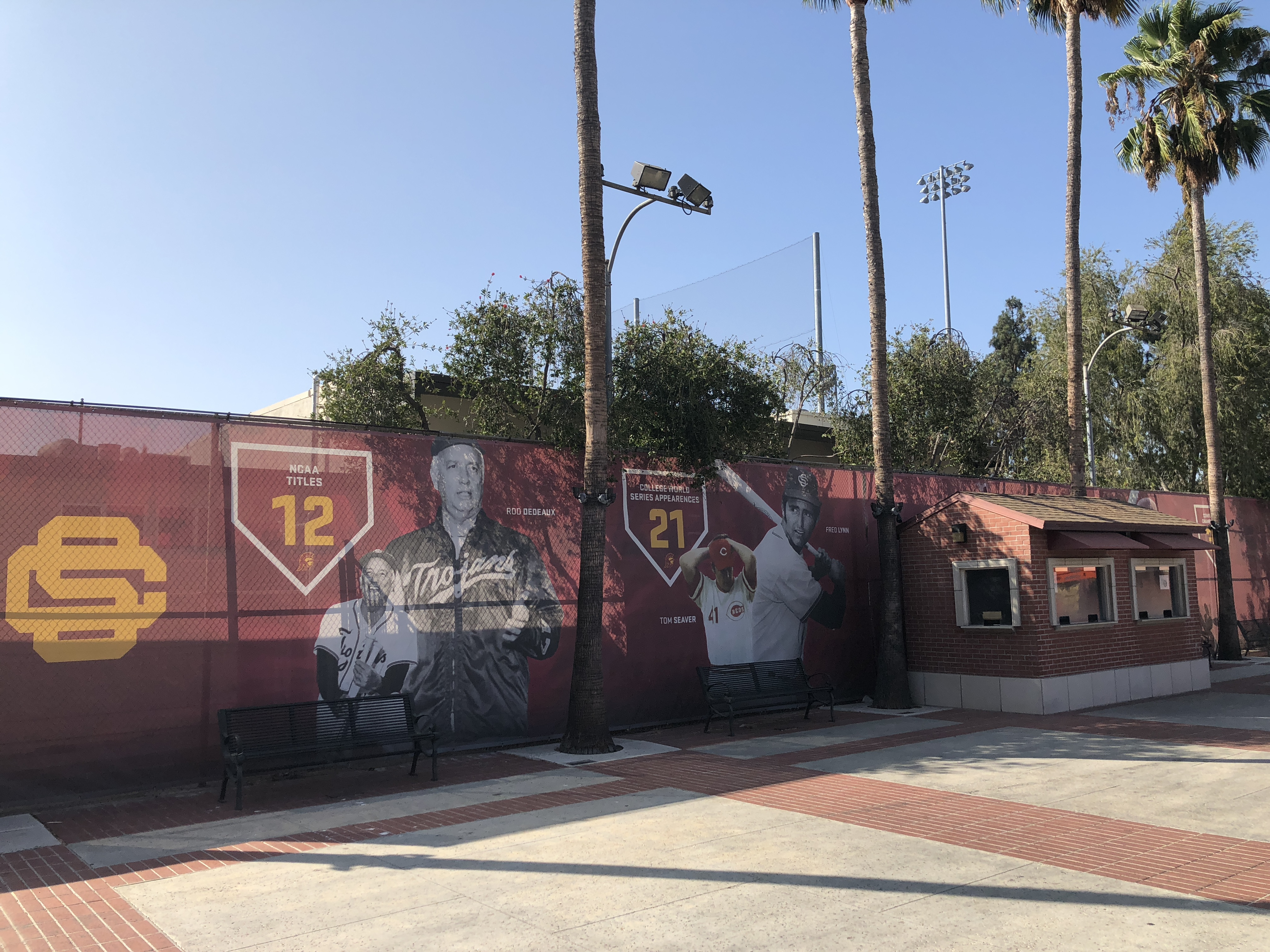
Dedeaux Field McGwire Way

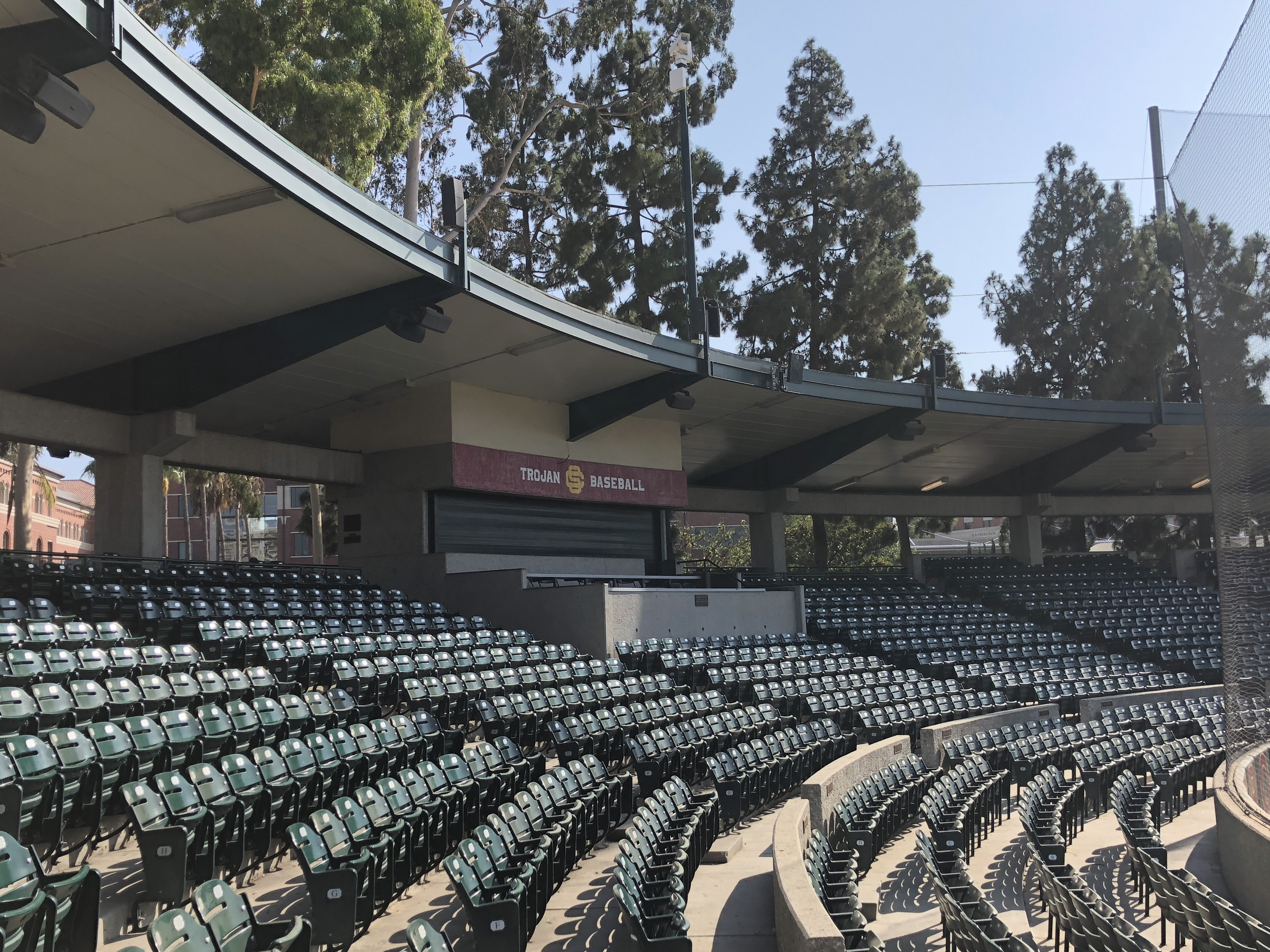
Dedeaux Field grandstand

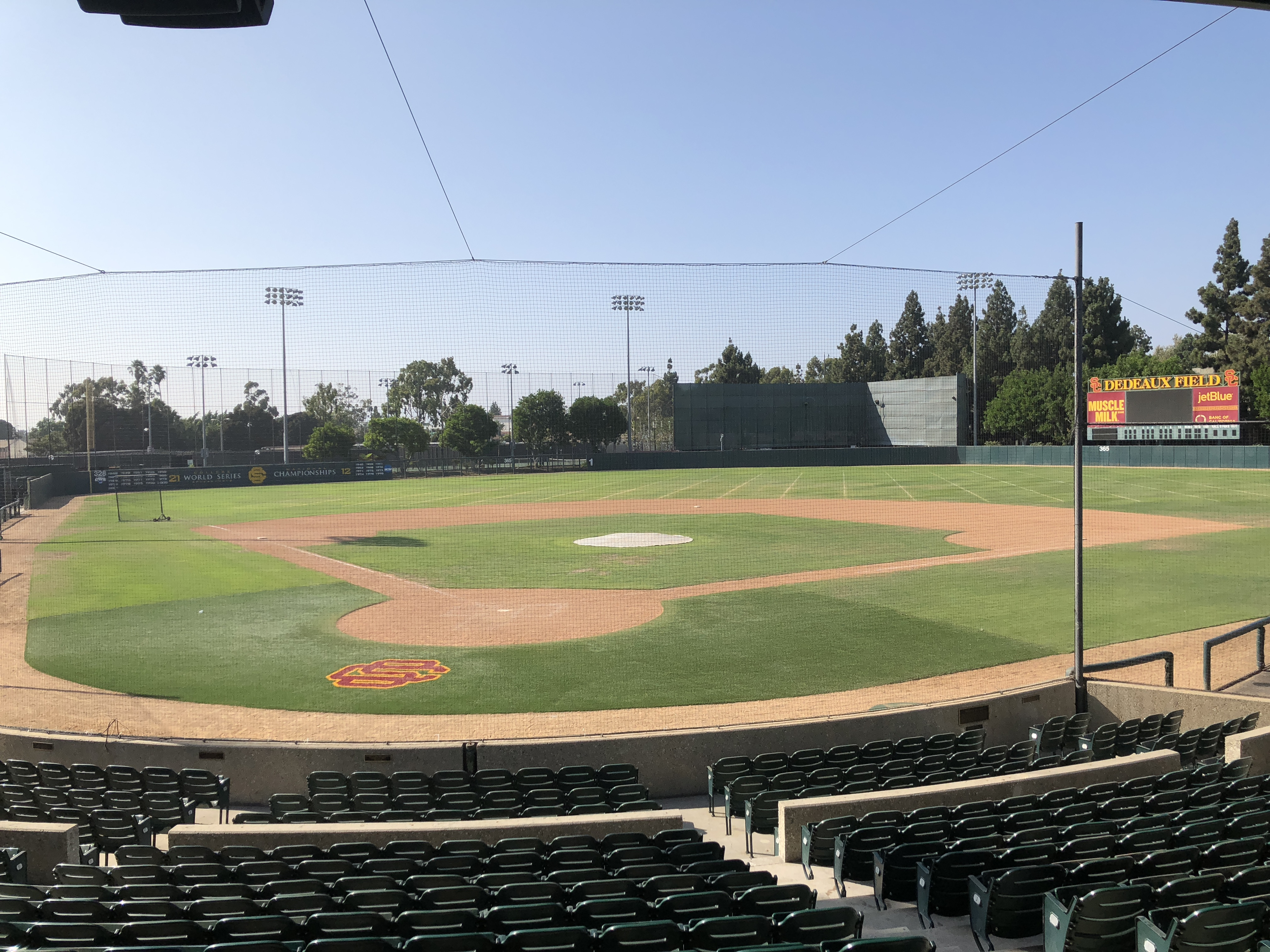
Dedeaux Field playing field

== See also ==
- List of NCAA Division I baseball venues
