= 2001 NCAA Division I baseball season =

Baseball season

- Number of teams: 291

NCAA tournament

College World Series
- Champions: Miami (FL) (4th title)
- Runners-up: Stanford (13th CWS Appearance)
- Winning coach: Jim Morris (2nd title)
- MOP: Charlton Jimerson (Miami (FL))

Seasons
- ← 2000 2002 →

The 2001 NCAA Division I baseball season, play of college baseball in the United States organized by the National Collegiate Athletic Association (NCAA) began in the spring of 2001. The season progressed through the regular season and concluded with the 2001 College World Series. The College World Series, held for the fifty fifth time in 2001, consisted of one team from each of eight super regional competitions and was held in Omaha, Nebraska, at Johnny Rosenblatt Stadium as a double-elimination tournament. Miami (FL) claimed the championship for the fourth time.

== Conference winners ==
This is a partial list of conference champions from the 2001 season. The NCAA sponsored regional and super regional competitions to determine the College World Series participants. Each of the sixteen regionals consisted of four teams competing in double-elimination tournaments, with the winners advancing to eight best of three Super Regionals. The winners of each Super Regional advanced to Omaha. 30 teams earned automatic bids by winning their conference championship while 34 teams earned at-large selections.

Conference	Regular season winner	Conference Tournament	Tournament Venue • City	Tournament Winner
America East Conference	Delaware	2001 America East Conference baseball tournament	Frawley Stadium • Wilmington, DE	Delaware
Atlantic Coast Conference	Florida State	2001 Atlantic Coast Conference baseball tournament	Knights Stadium • Fort Mill, SC	Wake Forest
Big 12 Conference	Nebraska	2001 Big 12 Conference baseball tournament	AT&T Bricktown Ballpark • Oklahoma City, OK	Nebraska
Big East Conference	Notre Dame	2001 Big East Conference baseball tournament	Commerce Bank Ballpark • Bridgewater, NJ	Seton Hall
Big South Conference	Winthrop	2001 Big South Conference baseball tournament	Dan Daniel Memorial Park • Danville, VA	Coastal Carolina
Big Ten Conference	Ohio State	2001 Big Ten Conference baseball tournament	Bill Davis Stadium • Columbus, OH	Minnesota
Big West Conference	Cal State Fullerton	No tournament		
Colonial Athletic Association	East Carolina	2001 Colonial Athletic Association baseball tournament	Coy Tillett Senior Memorial Field • Manteo, NC	William & Mary
Conference USA	Tulane	2001 Conference USA baseball tournament	Zephyr Field • New Orleans, LA	Tulane
Ivy League	Gehrig - Princeton; Rolfe - Dartmouth	2001 Ivy League Baseball Championship Series	Red Rolfe Field at Biondi Park • Hanover, NH	Princeton
Metro Atlantic Athletic Conference	Siena	2001 Metro Atlantic Athletic Conference baseball tournament	Dutchess Stadium • Wappingers Falls, NY	Marist
Mid-American Conference	East - Bowling Green; West - Ball State	2001 Mid-American Conference baseball tournament	Ball Diamond • Muncie, IN	Kent State
Midwestern Collegiate Conference	Milwaukee	2001 Midwestern Collegiate Conference baseball tournament	Les Miller Field • Chicago, IL	Milwaukee
Mid-Continent Conference	Oral Roberts	2001 Mid-Continent Conference baseball tournament	J. L. Johnson Stadium • Tulsa, OK	Oral Roberts
Northeast Conference	North - Central Connecticut/St. Francis; South - UMBC/Monmouth	2001 Northeast Conference baseball tournament	The Sandcastle • Atlantic City, NJ	UMBC
Pacific-10 Conference	Southern California	No tournament		
Patriot League	Navy	2001 Patriot League baseball tournament	Max Bishop Stadium • Annapolis, MD	Bucknell
Southeastern Conference	Eastern - Georgia; Western - LSU	2001 Southeastern Conference baseball tournament	Hoover Metropolitan Stadium • Hoover, AL	Mississippi State
Southern Conference	Georgia Southern	2001 Southern Conference baseball tournament	Joseph P. Riley Jr. Park • Charleston, SC	The Citadel
Southland Conference	Northwestern State	2001 Southland Conference baseball tournament	Vincent–Beck Stadium • Beaumont, TX	Texas–Arlington
Trans America Athletic Conference	UCF	2001 Trans America Athletic Conference baseball tournament	Alexander Brest Field • Jacksonville, FL	UCF
West Coast Conference	Coast - Gonzaga/Santa Clara; West - Pepperdine	2001 West Coast Conference Baseball Championship Series	Eddy D. Field Stadium • Malibu, CA	Pepperdine

== Conference standings ==
The following is an incomplete list of conference standings:

2001 Atlantic Coast Conference baseball standings
	Conf.				Overall
Team	W		L	PCT	W		L	PCT
No. 9 Florida State ‍†‍‍^{y}	20	–	4	.833	47	–	19	.712
No. 13 Clemson ‍‍‍^{y}	17	–	7	.708	41	–	22	.651
No. 18 Wake Forest ‍‍‡‍^{y}	16	–	8	.667	44	–	18	.710
No. 27 Georgia Tech ‍‍‍^{y}	13	–	11	.542	41	–	20	.672
Duke ‍‍‍	10	–	13	.435	23	–	33	.411
North Carolina ‍‍‍	9	–	15	.375	31	–	26	.544
Virginia ‍‍‍	9	–	15	.375	25	–	31	.446
NC State ‍‍‍	9	–	15	.375	32	–	29	.525
Maryland ‍‍‍	4	–	19	.174	17	–	37	.315
† – Conference champion ‡ – Tournament champion y – Invited to the NCAA tournament As of June 30, 2001; Rankings from Collegiate Baseball

2001 Big 12 Conference baseball standings
	Conf.						Overall
Team	W		L		T	PCT	W		L		T	PCT
No. 7 Nebraska ‍†‍‡‍^{y}	20	–	8	–	0	.714	50	–	16	–	1	.754
No. 21 Texas Tech ‍‍‍	19	–	10	–	1	.650	42	–	20	–	1	.675
No. 28 Texas ‍‍‍^{y}	19	–	11	–	0	.633	36	–	26	–	0	.581
No. 22 Baylor ‍‍‍^{y}	17	–	10	–	0	.630	37	–	24	–	0	.607
Oklahoma State ^{y} ‍‍‍	16	–	14	–	0	.533	42	–	22	–	0	.656
Texas A&M ‍‍‍	15	–	15	–	0	.500	33	–	27	–	0	.550
Oklahoma ‍‍‍	13	–	16	–	1	.450	25	–	33	–	1	.432
Iowa State ‍‍‍	11	–	15	–	0	.423	24	–	29	–	1	.454
Kansas State ‍‍‍	10	–	17	–	0	.370	25	–	28	–	0	.472
Missouri ‍‍‍	11	–	19	–	0	.367	31	–	24	–	1	.563
Kansas ‍‍‍	7	–	23	–	0	.233	26	–	30	–	0	.464
† – Conference champion ‡ – Tournament champion y – Invited to the NCAA tournament As of June 30, 2001; Rankings from Collegiate Baseball

2001 Big East Conference baseball standings
	Conf.						Overall
Team	W		L		T	PCT	W		L		T	PCT
No. 12 Notre Dame ‍†‍‍^{y}	22	–	4	–	0	.846	49	–	13	–	1	.786
No. 25 Rutgers ‍‍‍^{y}	18	–	8	–	0	.692	42	–	17	–	0	.712
Seton Hall ‍‍‡‍^{y}	14	–	11	–	1	.558	34	–	23	–	1	.595
Virginia Tech ‍‍‍	14	–	11	–	1	.558	29	–	28	–	1	.509
St. John's ‍‍‍	13	–	13	–	0	.500	31	–	22	–	0	.585
Connecticut ‍‍‍	13	–	13	–	0	.500	26	–	25	–	0	.510
West Virginia ‍‍‍	12	–	14	–	0	.462	27	–	26	–	0	.509
Boston College ‍‍‍	11	–	13	–	0	.458	29	–	22	–	0	.569
Villanova ‍‍‍	10	–	16	–	0	.385	25	–	25	–	1	.500
Georgetown ‍‍‍	7	–	19	–	0	.269	17	–	39	–	0	.304
Pittsburgh ‍‍‍	6	–	18	–	0	.250	18	–	27	–	0	.400
† – Conference champion ‡ – Tournament champion y – Invited to the NCAA tournament As of June 30, 2001; Rankings from Collegiate Baseball

2001 Big South Conference baseball standings
	Conf.						Overall
Team	W		L		T	PCT	W		L		T	PCT
No. 29 Winthrop ‍†‍‍^{y}	18	–	3	–	0	.857	48	–	16	–	1	.746
Coastal Carolina ‍‍‡‍^{y}	16	–	4	–	0	.800	42	–	20	–	0	.677
Liberty ‍‍‍	14	–	7	–	0	.667	35	–	21	–	0	.625
Elon ‍‍‍	12	–	9	–	0	.571	30	–	27	–	0	.526
UNC Asheville ‍‍‍	8	–	12	–	0	.400	15	–	39	–	0	.278
High Point ‍‍‍	5	–	14	–	0	.263	21	–	33	–	0	.389
Radford ‍‍‍	5	–	16	–	0	.238	12	–	38	–	0	.240
Charleston Southern ‍‍‍	3	–	16	–	0	.158	13	–	37	–	0	.260
† – Conference champion ‡ – Tournament champion y – Invited to the NCAA tournament As of June 30, 2001; Rankings from Collegiate Baseball

2001 Big Ten Conference baseball standings
	Conf.				Overall
Team	W		L	PCT	W		L	PCT
Ohio State ‍†‍‍^{y}	20	–	7	.741	43	–	18	.705
Purdue ‍‍‍	19	–	7	.731	32	–	24	.571
Minnesota ‍‍‡‍^{y}	19	–	8	.704	39	–	21	.650
Penn State ‍‍‍	15	–	11	.577	29	–	29	.500
Illinois ‍‍‍	13	–	14	.481	29	–	28	.509
Michigan ‍‍‍	10	–	14	.417	28	–	28	.500
Northwestern ‍‍‍	11	–	17	.393	24	–	32	.429
Michigan State ‍‍‍	9	–	17	.346	29	–	27	.518
Iowa ‍‍‍	8	–	17	.320	19	–	29	.396
Indiana ‍‍‍	7	–	19	.269	24	–	31	.436
x – Division champion ‡ – Tournament champion y – Invited to the NCAA tournament As of June 30, 2001; Rankings from Collegiate Baseball

2001 Big West Conference baseball standings
	Conf.				Overall
Team	W		L	PCT	W		L	PCT
No. 3 Cal State Fullerton ‍†‍‍^{y}	14	–	4	.778	48	–	18	.727
No. 26 UC Santa Barbara ‍‍‍^{y}	12	–	6	.667	40	–	17	.702
Long Beach State ‍‍‍^{y}	11	–	7	.611	35	–	23	.603
Cal State Northridge ‍‍‍	9	–	9	.500	24	–	22	.522
Cal Poly ‍‍‍	8	–	10	.444	30	–	26	.536
Pacific ‍‍‍	5	–	13	.278	25	–	30	.455
Sacramento State ‍‍‍	4	–	14	.222	24	–	35	.407
† – Conference champion y – Invited to the NCAA tournament As of June 30, 2001; Rankings from Collegiate Baseball

2001 Colonial Athletic Association baseball standings
	Conf.				Overall
Team	W		L	PCT	W		L	PCT
No. 11 East Carolina ‍†‍‍^{y}	19	–	2	.905	47	–	13	.783
No. 24 VCU ‍‍‍^{y}	12	–	8	.600	41	–	19	.683
William & Mary ‍‍‡‍^{y}	12	–	9	.571	35	–	20	.636
UNC Wilmington ‍‍‍	11	–	9	.550	33	–	22	.600
James Madison ‍‍‍	10	–	11	.476	36	–	23	.610
Richmond ‍‍‍	7	–	13	.350	27	–	26	.509
Old Dominion ‍‍‍	6	–	15	.286	19	–	37	.339
George Mason ‍‍‍	5	–	15	.250	21	–	32	.396
† – Conference champion ‡ – Tournament champion y – Invited to the NCAA tournament East Carolina and Richmond were ineligible for the Conference Tournament as they prepared to depart the conference. As of June 30, 2001; Rankings from Collegiate Baseball

2001 Conference USA baseball standings
	Conf.				Overall
Team	W		L	PCT	W		L	PCT
No. 6 Tulane ‍†‍‡‍^{y}	21	–	6	.778	56	–	13	.812
Houston ‍‍‍^{y}	20	–	7	.741	29	–	30	.492
South Florida ‍‍‍	16	–	11	.593	33	–	31	.516
Cincinnati ‍‍‍	16	–	11	.593	34	–	24	.586
Memphis ‍‍‍	13	–	14	.481	34	–	24	.586
Louisville ‍‍‍	13	–	14	.481	32	–	29	.525
Southern Miss ‍‍‍	11	–	16	.407	27	–	32	.458
Charlotte ‍‍‍	10	–	17	.370	24	–	31	.436
Saint Louis ‍‍‍	9	–	18	.333	21	–	32	.396
UAB ‍‍‍	6	–	21	.222	25	–	30	.455
† – Conference champion ‡ – Tournament champion y – Invited to the NCAA tournament Rankings from Collegiate Baseball

2001 NCAA Division I baseball independents standings
	Conf.				Overall
Team	W		L	PCT	W		L	PCT
No. 1 Miami (FL) ‍‍‍^{y}		–		–	47	–	12	.797
Belmont ‍‍‍		–		–	28	–	24	.538
Centenary ‍‍‍		–		–	23	–	36	.390
Texas A&M–Corpus Christi ‍‍‍		–		–	18	–	36	.333
Texas–Pan American ‍‍‍		–		–	12	–	40	.231
y – Invited to the NCAA tournament As of June 30, 2001; Rankings from Collegiate Baseball

2001 Ivy League baseball standings
	Conf.				Overall
Team	W		L	PCT	W		L	PCT
Lou Gehrig
Princeton ^{x}‍‍‡‍^{y}	14	–	6	.700	23	–	15	.605
Columbia ‍‍‍	10	–	10	.500	20	–	27	.426
Penn ‍‍‍	8	–	12	.400	22	–	18	.550
Cornell ‍‍‍	7	–	13	.350	12	–	26	.316
Red Rolfe
Dartmouth ^{x}‍‍‍	12	–	8	.600	22	–	18	.550
Brown ^{x}‍‍‍	12	–	8	.600	23	–	23	.500
Harvard ‍‍‍	11	–	9	.550	18	–	26	.409
Yale ‍‍‍	6	–	14	.300	12	–	22	.353
x – Division champion ‡ – Championship Series champion y – Invited to the NCAA tournament As of June 30, 2001; Rankings from Collegiate Baseball

2001 Metro Atlantic Athletic Conference baseball standings
	Conf.				Overall
Team	W		L	PCT	W		L	PCT
Siena ‍†‍‍	19	–	8	.704	29	–	29	.500
Rider ‍‍‍	18	–	9	.667	27	–	27	.500
Marist ‍‍‡‍^{y}	17	–	10	.630	33	–	21	.611
Le Moyne ‍‍‍	13	–	8	.619	29	–	20	.592
Niagara ‍‍‍	15	–	11	.577	25	–	20	.556
Fairfield ‍‍‍	14	–	13	.519	17	–	28	.378
Manhattan ‍‍‍	9	–	15	.375	20	–	25	.444
Canisius ‍‍‍	10	–	17	.370	14	–	28	.333
Iona ‍‍‍	8	–	15	.348	17	–	32	.347
Saint Peter's ‍‍‍	4	–	23	.148	4	–	39	.093
† – Conference champion ‡ – Tournament champion y – Invited to the NCAA tournament As of June 30, 2001; Rankings from Collegiate Baseball

2001 Mid-American Conference baseball standings
	Conf.				Overall
Team	W		L	PCT	W		L	PCT
East
Bowling Green ^{x}‍‍‍	18	–	9	.667	36	–	18	.667
Ohio ‍‍‍	16	–	11	.593	29	–	25	.537
Kent State ‍‍‡‍^{y}	16	–	11	.593	32	–	30	.516
Miami ‍‍‍	16	–	12	.571	35	–	25	.583
Marshall ‍‍‍	11	–	17	.393	24	–	29	.453
Akron ‍‍‍	9	–	18	.333	16	–	34	.320
Buffalo ‍‍‍	5	–	23	.179	11	–	39	.220
West
Ball State ^{x}‍‍‍	21	–	5	.808	34	–	23	.596
Central Michigan ‍‍‍	16	–	12	.571	35	–	24	.593
Eastern Michigan ‍‍‍	14	–	12	.538	20	–	33	.377
Western Michigan ‍‍‍	15	–	13	.536	26	–	28	.481
Northern Illinois ‍‍‍	10	–	17	.370	28	–	27	.509
Toledo ‍‍‍	10	–	17	.370	26	–	29	.473
† – Conference champion ‡ – Tournament champion y – Invited to the NCAA tournament As of June 30, 2001; Rankings from Collegiate Baseball

2001 Mid-Continent Conference baseball standings
	Conf.						Overall
Team	W		L		T	PCT	W		L		T	PCT
Oral Roberts ‍†‍‡‍^{y}	24	–	1	–	0	.960	48	–	13	–	0	.787
Southern Utah ‍‍‍	19	–	9	–	0	.679	23	–	37	–	0	.383
Valparaiso ‍‍‍	14	–	10	–	0	.583	28	–	29	–	0	.491
Youngstown State ‍‍‍	12	–	15	–	0	.444	24	–	30	–	1	.445
IUPUI ‍‍‍	11	–	17	–	0	.393	17	–	37	–	0	.315
Western Illinois ‍‍‍	10	–	16	–	0	.385	12	–	38	–	0	.240
Chicago State ‍‍‍	8	–	18	–	0	.308	15	–	36	–	0	.294
Oakland ‍‍‍	7	–	19	–	0	.269	11	–	43	–	0	.204
‡ – Tournament champion y – Invited to the NCAA tournament As of June 30, 2001; Rankings from Collegiate Baseball

2001 Midwestern Collegiate Conference baseball standings
	Conf.				Overall
Team	W		L	PCT	W		L	PCT
Milwaukee ‍‍‡‍^{y}	16	–	4	.800	39	–	18	.684
UIC ‍‍‍	13	–	7	.650	32	–	28	.533
Wright State ‍‍‍	12	–	8	.600	31	–	27	.534
Butler ‍‍‍	8	–	12	.400	25	–	30	.455
Cleveland State ‍‍‍	6	–	14	.300	23	–	34	.404
Detroit ‍‍‍	5	–	15	.250	12	–	41	.226
‡ – Tournament champion y – Invited to the NCAA Tournament; As of June 30, 2001; Rankings from Collegiate Baseball

2001 Mountain West Conference baseball standings
	Conf.				Overall
Team	W		L	PCT	W		L	PCT
BYU ‍†‍‡‍^{y}	21	–	8	.724	38	–	22	.633
San Diego State ‍‍‍	19	–	11	.633	34	–	26	.567
Utah ‍‍‍	14	–	16	.467	27	–	29	.482
New Mexico ‍‍‍	14	–	16	.467	26	–	34	.433
UNLV ‍‍‍	13	–	17	.433	23	–	33	.411
Air Force ‍‍‍	8	–	21	.276	23	–	33	.411
† – Conference champion ‡ – Tournament champion y – Invited to the 2001 NCAA Division I baseball tournament As of June 30, 2001; Rankings from Collegiate Baseball

2001 Northeast Conference baseball standings
	Conf.						Overall
Team	W		L		T	PCT	W		L		T	PCT
North
Central Connecticut ^{x}‍‍‍	14	–	8	–	0	.636	30	–	22	–	0	.577
St. Francis ^{x}‍‍‍	14	–	8	–	0	.636	25	–	22	–	0	.532
Long Island ‍‍‍	13	–	9	–	0	.591	18	–	24	–	0	.429
Sacred Heart ‍‍‍	12	–	10	–	0	.545	22	–	23	–	0	.489
Quinnipiac ‍‍‍	3	–	19	–	0	.136	5	–	37	–	0	.119
South
UMBC ^{x}‍‍‡‍^{y}	17	–	5	–	0	.773	31	–	20	–	2	.604
Monmouth ^{x}‍‍‍	17	–	5	–	0	.773	29	–	24	–	0	.547
Fairleigh Dickinson ‍‍‍	9	–	13	–	0	.409	13	–	27	–	0	.325
Wagner ‍‍‍	8	–	14	–	0	.364	16	–	30	–	1	.351
Mount St. Mary's ‍‍‍	3	–	19	–	0	.136	12	–	37	–	0	.245
x – Division champion ‡ – Tournament champion y – Invited to the NCAA tournament Rankings from Collegiate Baseball

2001 Pacific-10 Conference baseball standings
	Conf.						Overall
Team	W		L		T	PCT	W		L		T	PCT
No. 5 Southern California ‍†‍‍	18	–	6	–	0	.750	45	–	19	–	0	.703
No. 2 Stanford ‍‍‍^{y}	17	–	7	–	0	.708	51	–	17	–	0	.750
No. 23 Arizona State ‍‍‍^{y}	14	–	10	–	0	.583	37	–	20	–	1	.647
California ‍‍‍^{y}	14	–	10	–	0	.583	34	–	25	–	0	.576
Arizona ‍‍‍	12	–	12	–	0	.500	33	–	23	–	0	.589
Oregon State ‍‍‍	11	–	13	–	0	.458	31	–	24	–	0	.564
UCLA ‍‍‍	9	–	15	–	0	.375	30	–	27	–	0	.526
Washington ‍‍‍	7	–	17	–	0	.292	29	–	23	–	0	.558
Washington State ‍‍‍	6	–	18	–	0	.250	15	–	39	–	0	.278
† – Conference champion y – Invited to the NCAA tournament As of June 30, 2001; Rankings from Collegiate Baseball

2001 Patriot League baseball standings
	Conf.						Overall
Team	W		L		T	PCT	W		L		T	PCT
Navy ‍†‍‍	14	–	6	–	0	.700	21	–	25	–	1	.457
Bucknell ‍†‍‡‍^{y}	14	–	6	–	0	.700	31	–	19	–	0	.620
Holy Cross ‍‍‍	11	–	9	–	0	.550	19	–	23	–	0	.452
Army ‍‍‍	10	–	10	–	0	.500	17	–	27	–	1	.389
Lehigh ‍‍‍	6	–	14	–	0	.300	14	–	28	–	0	.333
Lafayette ‍‍‍	5	–	15	–	0	.250	10	–	32	–	0	.238
‡ – Tournament champion y – Invited to the NCAA tournament As of June 30, 2001; Rankings from Collegiate Baseball

2001 Southeastern Conference baseball standings
	Conf.				Overall
Team	W		L	PCT	W		L	PCT
Eastern
No. 8 Georgia ^{x}‍†‍‍^{y}	20	–	10	.667	45	–	19	.703
No. 4 Tennessee ‍‍‍^{y}	18	–	12	.600	48	–	20	.706
No. 15 South Carolina ‍‍‍^{y}	17	–	13	.567	48	–	18	.727
Florida ‍‍‍^{y}	16	–	14	.533	35	–	27	.565
Vanderbilt ‍‍‍	9	–	21	.300	23	–	31	.426
Kentucky ‍‍‍	7	–	23	.233	22	–	34	.393
Western
No. 10 LSU ^{x}‍‍‍^{y}	18	–	12	.600	44	–	22	.667
#14 Mississippi State‡^{y} ‍‍‍	17	–	13	.567	39	–	22	.639
Ole Miss ‍‍‍^{y}	17	–	13	.567	39	–	23	.629
No. 30 Auburn ‍‍‍^{y}	15	–	15	.500	32	–	23	.582
Alabama ‍‍‍	15	–	15	.500	32	–	23	.582
Arkansas ‍‍‍	11	–	19	.367	27	–	29	.482
x – Division champion † – Conference champion ‡ – Tournament champion y – Invited to the NCAA tournament As of June 30, 2001; Rankings from Collegiate Baseball

2001 Southern Conference baseball standings
	Conf.				Overall
Team	W		L	PCT	W		L	PCT
Georgia Southern ‍†‍‍^{y}	21	–	9	.700	42	–	20	.677
The Citadel ‍‍‡‍^{y}	20	–	10	.667	38	–	24	.613
Furman ‍‍‍	18	–	11	.621	30	–	25	.545
Western Carolina ‍‍‍	18	–	11	.621	30	–	26	.536
UNC Greensboro ‍‍‍	17	–	12	.586	31	–	28	.525
Appalachian State ‍‍‍	12	–	14	.462	21	–	32	.396
East Tennessee State ‍‍‍	13	–	17	.433	21	–	32	.396
College of Charleston ‍‍‍	10	–	16	.385	24	–	28	.462
Wofford ‍‍‍	9	–	17	.346	17	–	31	.354
Davidson ‍‍‍	10	–	20	.333	19	–	32	.373
VMI ‍‍‍	8	–	19	.296	15	–	32	.319
† – Conference champion ‡ – SoCon Tournament champion y – Invited to the NCAA tournament As of June 30, 2001; Rankings from Collegiate Baseball

2001 Southland Conference baseball standings
	Conf.				Overall
Team	W		L	PCT	W		L	PCT
Northwestern State ‍†‍‍	19	–	8	.704	38	–	17	.691
Louisiana–Monroe ‍‍‍	17	–	10	.630	29	–	29	.500
Texas–Arlington ‍‍‡‍^{y}	15	–	11	.577	39	–	25	.609
Southwest Texas State ‍‍‍	15	–	11	.577	36	–	22	.621
Texas–San Antonio ‍‍‍	15	–	12	.556	30	–	29	.508
Lamar ‍‍‍	13	–	14	.481	37	–	24	.607
McNeese State ‍‍‍	12	–	15	.444	29	–	25	.537
Nicholls State ‍‍‍	12	–	15	.444	26	–	30	.464
Southeastern Louisiana ‍‍‍	8	–	19	.296	22	–	33	.400
Sam Houston State ‍‍‍	8	–	19	.296	19	–	31	.380
† – Conference champion ‡ – Tournament champion y – Invited to the NCAA tournament As of June 30, 2001; Rankings from Collegiate Baseball

2001 Trans America Athletic Conference baseball standings
	Conf.				Overall
Team	W		L	PCT	W		L	PCT
No. 17 UCF ‍†‍‡‍^{y}	22	–	5	.815	51	–	14	.785
Stetson ‍‍‍^{y}	19	–	8	.704	43	–	17	.717
Jacksonville ‍‍‍^{y}	18	–	9	.667	39	–	25	.609
Campbell ‍‍‍	17	–	10	.630	33	–	21	.611
Florida Atlantic ‍‍‍	14	–	13	.519	36	–	24	.600
Troy State ‍‍‍	12	–	15	.444	27	–	28	.491
Samford ‍‍‍	12	–	15	.444	20	–	34	.370
Mercer ‍‍‍	10	–	17	.370	24	–	28	.462
Georgia State ‍‍‍	8	–	19	.296	20	–	35	.364
Jacksonville State ‍‍‍	3	–	24	.111	11	–	39	.220
† – Conference champion ‡ – Tournament champion y – Invited to the NCAA tournament As of June 30, 2001; Rankings from Collegiate Baseball

2001 West Coast Conference baseball standings
	Conf.				Overall
Team	W		L	PCT	W		L	PCT
West
No. 20 Pepperdine ^{x}‍‍‡‍^{y}	25	–	5	.833	42	–	18	.700
San Diego ‍‍‍	20	–	10	.667	34	–	21	.618
Saint Mary's ‍‍‍	10	–	20	.333	18	–	36	.333
Portland ‍‍‍	9	–	21	.300	20	–	34	.370
Coast
Gonzaga ^{x}‍‍‍	17	–	13	.567	28	–	26	.519
Santa Clara ^{x}‍‍‍	17	–	13	.567	23	–	33	.411
San Francisco ‍‍‍	14	–	16	.467	28	–	26	.519
Loyola Marymount ‍‍‍	8	–	22	.267	21	–	37	.362
x – Division champion ‡ – Championship Series champion y – Invited to the NCAA tournament As of June 30, 2001; Rankings from Collegiate Baseball

== College World Series ==
The 2001 season marked the fifty fifth NCAA baseball tournament, which culminated with the eight team College World Series. The College World Series was held in Omaha, Nebraska. The eight teams played a double-elimination format, with Miami (FL) claiming their fourth championship with a 12–1 win over Stanford in the final.

=== Bracket ===
First round
5	Tulane	11
4	Stanford	13
8	Nebraska	4
1	Cal State Fullerton	5
5	Tulane	6
8	Nebraska	5
6	Georgia	5
3	Southern California	11
Tennessee	13
2	Miami (FL)	21
Tennessee	19
6	Georgia	12

Second round
4	Stanford	5^{10}
1	Cal State Fullerton	2
1	Cal State Fullerton	11
5	Tulane	2
3	Southern California	3
2	Miami (FL)	4
3	Southern California	2
Tennessee	10

Semifinals
1	Cal State Fullerton	1	—
4	Stanford	4	—
2	Miami (FL)	12	—
Tennessee	6	—

Finals
4	Stanford	1
2	Miami (FL)	12
