= 2001 Nebraska Cornhuskers baseball team =

American college baseball season

2001 Nebraska Cornhuskers baseball

Big 12 Conference Regular Season champions Big 12 Tournament champions NCAA Lincoln Regional champions NCAA Lincoln Super Regional champions

2001 College World Series, T-7th
- Conference: Big 12 Conference

Ranking
- Coaches: No. 7
- CB: No. 7
- Record: 50–16 (20–8 Big 12)
- Head coach: Dave Van Horn (4th season)
- Assistant coach: Kevin Koch
- Hitting coach: Mike Anderson (7th season)
- Pitching coach: Rob Childress (4th season)
- Home stadium: Buck Beltzer Stadium

2001 Big 12 Conference baseball standings
	Conf.						Overall
Team	W		L		T	PCT	W		L		T	PCT
No. 7 Nebraska ‍†‍‡‍^{y}	20	–	8	–	0	.714	50	–	16	–	1	.754
No. 21 Texas Tech ‍‍‍	19	–	10	–	1	.650	42	–	20	–	1	.675
No. 28 Texas ‍‍‍^{y}	19	–	11	–	0	.633	36	–	26	–	0	.581
No. 22 Baylor ‍‍‍^{y}	17	–	10	–	0	.630	37	–	24	–	0	.607
Oklahoma State ^{y} ‍‍‍	16	–	14	–	0	.533	42	–	22	–	0	.656
Texas A&M ‍‍‍	15	–	15	–	0	.500	33	–	27	–	0	.550
Oklahoma ‍‍‍	13	–	16	–	1	.450	25	–	33	–	1	.432
Iowa State ‍‍‍	11	–	15	–	0	.423	24	–	29	–	1	.454
Kansas State ‍‍‍	10	–	17	–	0	.370	25	–	28	–	0	.472
Missouri ‍‍‍	11	–	19	–	0	.367	31	–	24	–	1	.563
Kansas ‍‍‍	7	–	23	–	0	.233	26	–	30	–	0	.464
† – Conference champion ‡ – Tournament champion y – Invited to the NCAA tournament As of June 30, 2001; Rankings from Collegiate Baseball

The 2001 Nebraska Cornhuskers baseball team represented the University of Nebraska–Lincoln in the 2001 NCAA Division I baseball season. The head coach was Dave Van Horn, serving his 4th year.

The Cornhuskers lost in the College World Series, defeated by the Tulane Green Wave.

== Roster ==
2001 Nebraska Cornhuskers baseball team
Players
Coaches

#	Pos.	Name	B/T	Height	Weight	Year	Home town
1	OF	Jeff Leise	L/L	5 ft 9 in (1.75 m)	165 lb (75 kg)	So	Omaha, Nebraska
3	C	Jed Morris	L/R	6 ft 0 in (1.83 m)	190 lb (86 kg)	So	Seabrook, Texas
4	INF	John Cole	R/R	5 ft 11 in (1.8 m)	185 lb (84 kg)	Jr	Kanata, Ontario
5	INF	Josh Hesse	R/R	5 ft 11 in (1.8 m)	175 lb (79 kg)	Sr	Omaha, Nebraska
7	INF	Will Bolt	R/R	5 ft 9 in (1.75 m)	165 lb (75 kg)	Jr	Conroe, Texas
8	INF	Jeff Blevins	S/R	5 ft 11 in (1.8 m)	170 lb (77 kg)	Jr	Sand Springs, Oklahoma
9	INF	Willie Jones	R/R	5 ft 10 in (1.78 m)	165 lb (75 kg)	Jr	Torrington, Wyoming
10	OF	Justin Seely	L/L	5 ft 10 in (1.78 m)	180 lb (82 kg)	Jr	Nacogdoches, Texas
11	OF	Drew Anderson	R/R	6 ft 2 in (1.88 m)	195 lb (88 kg)	Fr	Kearney, Nebraska
12	LHP	Jeremy Becker	L/L	5 ft 11 in (1.8 m)	195 lb (88 kg)	Jr	Scottsbluff, Nebraska
14	INF	Brandon Eymann	L/R	6 ft 0 in (1.83 m)	190 lb (86 kg)	Jr	Papillion, Nebraska
15	INF	Dan Johnson	L/R	6 ft 2 in (1.88 m)	215 lb (98 kg)	Sr	Coon Rapids, Minnesota
16	INF	Matt Hopper	R/R	6 ft 4 in (1.93 m)	210 lb (95 kg)	So	Golden, Colorado
17	OF	Matt Daegas	L/L	6 ft 1 in (1.85 m)	185 lb (84 kg)	Fr	Harlan, Iowa
18	OF	Mike Duren	R/R	5 ft 9 in (1.75 m)	190 lb (86 kg)	Fr	Arvada, Colorado
19	LHP	Waylon Byers	L/L	6 ft 1 in (1.85 m)	180 lb (82 kg)	So	Milo, Iowa
20	RHP	Steve Hale	R/R	5 ft 11 in (1.8 m)	195 lb (88 kg)	So	Yukon, Oklahoma
21	OF	Adam Stern	L/R	5 ft 10 in (1.78 m)	177 lb (80 kg)	Jr	London, Ontario
22	RHP	R. D. Spiehs	R/R	6 ft 3 in (1.91 m)	225 lb (102 kg)	Jr	Grand Island, Nebraska
23		Tyler Banker	L/R	6 ft 1 in (1.85 m)	185 lb (84 kg)	Fr	Overland Park, Kansas
24	C	Tito Rivera	R/R	6 ft 0 in (1.83 m)	205 lb (93 kg)	Jr	Schenectady, New York
25	RHP	Brent Potter	R/R	5 ft 11 in (1.8 m)	200 lb (91 kg)	So	Runnells, Iowa
28	RHP	Shane Komine	R/R	5 ft 9 in (1.75 m)	165 lb (75 kg)	Jr	Honolulu, Hawaii
30	RHP	Derrick Conte	R/R	6 ft 1 in (1.85 m)	200 lb (91 kg)	RS Fr	Oklahoma City, Oklahoma
31	LHP	Mitch Solt	L/L	6 ft 1 in (1.85 m)	210 lb (95 kg)	Fr	Central City, Nebraska
32	RHP	Jason Burch	R/R	6 ft 5 in (1.96 m)	220 lb (100 kg)	Fr	Papillion, Nebraska
33	LHP	Jamie Rodrigue	R/L	6 ft 0 in (1.83 m)	200 lb (91 kg)	So	St. Clair, Missouri
34	RHP	Thom Ott	R/R	6 ft 3 in (1.91 m)	200 lb (91 kg)	Jr	Nassau, Bahamas
35	RHP	Adrian Rider	R/R	5 ft 8 in (1.73 m)	175 lb (79 kg)	RS Fr	Omaha, Nebraska
36	LHP	Brian Rodaway	L/L	6 ft 3 in (1.91 m)	185 lb (84 kg)	Sr	Lincoln, Nebraska
37	LHP	Brandon Penas	L/L	5 ft 9 in (1.75 m)	185 lb (84 kg)	Sr	Grand Island, Nebraska
38	RHP	Dustin Timm	R/R	6 ft 3 in (1.91 m)	180 lb (82 kg)	Fr	Yutan, Nebraska
39	LHP	Justin Pekarek	R/L	6 ft 3 in (1.91 m)	190 lb (86 kg)	RS Fr	Staplehurst, Nebraska
40	RHP	Jeff Blaesing	R/R	6 ft 2 in (1.88 m)	220 lb (100 kg)	Jr	Lockport, Illinois
41	C	Zack Hughes	R/R	6 ft 0 in (1.83 m)	195 lb (88 kg)	Fr	Eaton, Colorado
42	C	Sam Nocita	R/R	5 ft 11 in (1.8 m)	185 lb (84 kg)	Fr	Gretna, Nebraska
43	INF	Ben McCown	R/R	5 ft 11 in (1.8 m)	170 lb (77 kg)	Fr	Aurora, Colorado
44	RHP	Mike Sillman	R/R	6 ft 1 in (1.85 m)	180 lb (82 kg)	Fr	Omaha, Nebraska
45	RHP	Ben Deas	R/R	6 ft 2 in (1.88 m)	210 lb (95 kg)	Fr	Omaha, Nebraska

Head coach

Dave Van Horn

Assistant coach(es)

Kevin Koch

Hitting coach(es)

Mike Anderson

Pitching coach(es)

Rob Childress

Legend

- (C) Team captain
- (S) Suspended
- (I) Ineligible
- Injured
- Current redshirt

== Schedule ==
2001 Nebraska Cornhuskers baseball game log (50–16)
Regular season (41–14)
February (6–3)

#	Date	Opponent	Rank	Site/stadium	Score	Overall record	Big 12 record
1	February 9	at No. 7 Rice	No. 4	Reckling Park • Houston, Texas	L 2–16	0–1	0–0
2	February 10	vs. Lamar	No. 4	Reckling Park • Houston, Texas	W 10–4	1–1	0–0
3	February 11	vs. No. 1 Georgia Tech	No. 4	Reckling Park • Houston, Texas	L 8–15	1–2	0–0
4	February 16	at New Mexico	No. 7	Lobo Field • Albuquerque, New Mexico	W 14–7	2–2	0–0
5	February 17	vs. Utah	No. 7	Lobo Field • Albuquerque, New Mexico	L 6–7	2–3	0–0
6	February 18	vs. UNLV	No. 7	Lobo Field • Albuquerque, New Mexico	W 14–0	3–3	0–0
7	February 23	vs. Ohio State	No. 11	M. L. Tigue Moore Field at Russo Park • Lafayette, Louisiana	W 10–5	4–3	0–0
8	February 24	at Louisiana–Lafayette	No. 11	M. L. Tigue Moore Field at Russo Park • Lafayette, Louisiana	W 6–3	5–3	0–0
9	February 25	vs. No. 25 Wichita State	No. 11	M. L. Tigue Moore Field at Russo Park • Lafayette, Louisiana	W 8–7	6–3	0–0

March (14–4)

#	Date	Opponent	Rank	Site/stadium	Score	Overall record	Big 12 record
10	March 2	at Texas Tech	No. 12	Dan Law Field • Lubbock, Texas	W 3–2	7–3	1–0
11	March 3	at Texas Tech	No. 12	Dan Law Field • Lubbock, Texas	W 8–7	8–3	2–0
12	March 4	at Texas Tech	No. 12	Dan Law Field • Lubbock, Texas	W 10–8	9–3	3–0
13	March 6	at Southern Utah	No. 11	Thunderbird Park • Cedar City, Utah	W 18–6	10–3	3–0
14	March 6	at Southern Utah	No. 11	Thunderbird Park • Cedar City, Utah	W 12–9	11–3	3–0
15	March 9	Kansas State	No. 11	Buck Beltzer Stadium • Lincoln, Nebraska	W 9–6	12–3	4–0
16	March 13	at Louisiana Tech	No. 5	J. C. Love Field • Ruston, Louisiana	W 13–2	13–3	4–0
17	March 15	at Northwestern State	No. 5	H. Alvin Brown–C. C. Stroud Field • Natchitoches, Louisiana	W 13–1	14–3	4–0
18	March 16	at Centenary	No. 5	Shehee Stadium • Shreveport, Louisiana	W 17–4	15–3	4–0
19	March 16	at Centenary	No. 5	Shehee Stadium • Shreveport, Louisiana	L 8–9	15–4	4–0
20	March 17	at Centenary	No. 5	Shehee Stadium • Shreveport, Louisiana	W 12–1	16–4	4–0
21	March 20	at Wichita State	No. 5	Eck Stadium • Wichita, Kansas	L 5–6	16–5	4–0
22	March 24	Missouri	No. 5	Buck Beltzer Stadium • Lincoln, Nebraska	W 14–4	17–5	5–0
23	March 24	Missouri	No. 5	Buck Beltzer Stadium • Lincoln, Nebraska	L 2–6	17–6	5–1
24	March 25	Missouri	No. 5	Buck Beltzer Stadium • Lincoln, Nebraska	L 2–3	17–7	5–2
25	March 28	Milwaukee	No. 15	Buck Beltzer Stadium • Lincoln, Nebraska	W 16–10	18–7	5–2
26	March 28	Milwaukee	No. 15	Buck Beltzer Stadium • Lincoln, Nebraska	W 16–2	19–7	5–2
27	March 30	at Oklahoma	No. 15	L. Dale Mitchell Baseball Park • Norman, Oklahoma	W 7–1	20–7	6–2

April (15–5)

#	Date	Opponent	Rank	Site/stadium	Score	Overall record	Big 12 record
28	April 1	at Oklahoma	No. 15	L. Dale Mitchell Baseball Park • Norman, Oklahoma	W 10–5	21–7	7–2
29	April 2	at Oklahoma	No. 15	L. Dale Mitchell Baseball Park • Norman, Oklahoma	W 14–4	22–7	8–2
30	April 4	Creighton	No. 10	Buck Beltzer Stadium • Lincoln, Nebraska	W 14–9	23–7	8–2
31	April 7	No. 18 Texas	No. 10	Buck Beltzer Stadium • Lincoln, Nebraska	W 10–8	24–7	9–2
32	April 7	No. 18 Texas	No. 10	Buck Beltzer Stadium • Lincoln, Nebraska	W 5–4	25–7	10–2
33	April 8	No. 18 Texas	No. 10	Buck Beltzer Stadium • Lincoln, Nebraska	L 1–2	25–8	10–3
34	April 10	Southern Utah	No. 5	Buck Beltzer Stadium • Lincoln, Nebraska	W 5–2	26–8	10–3
35	April 10	Southern Utah	No. 5	Buck Beltzer Stadium • Lincoln, Nebraska	W 13–3	27–8	10–3
36	April 13	No. 12 Baylor	No. 5	Buck Beltzer Stadium • Lincoln, Nebraska	W 6–2	28–8	11–3
37	April 14	No. 12 Baylor	No. 5	Buck Beltzer Stadium • Lincoln, Nebraska	W 6–4	29–8	12–3
38	April 15	No. 12 Baylor	No. 5	Buck Beltzer Stadium • Lincoln, Nebraska	W 10–4	30–8	13–3
39	April 17	UTSA	No. 5	Buck Beltzer Stadium • Lincoln, Nebraska	W 17–0	31–8	13–3
40	April 18	UTSA	No. 5	Buck Beltzer Stadium • Lincoln, Nebraska	W 16–6	32–8	13–3
41	April 20	at Kansas	No. 5	Hoglund Ballpark • Lawrence, Kansas	W 9–0	33–8	14–3
42	April 21	at Kansas	No. 5	Hoglund Ballpark • Lawrence, Kansas	W 5–2	34–8	15–3
43	April 22	at Kansas	No. 5	Hoglund Ballpark • Lawrence, Kansas	L 3–12	34–9	15–4
44	April 24	Creighton	No. 4	Buck Beltzer Stadium • Lincoln, Nebraska	L 8–11	34–10	15–4
45	April 27	at Texas A&M	No. 4	Olsen Field at Blue Bell Park • College Station, Texas	W 6–4	35–10	16–4
46	April 28	at Texas A&M	No. 4	Olsen Field at Blue Bell Park • College Station, Texas	L 8–11	35–11	16–5
47	April 29	at Texas A&M	No. 4	Olsen Field at Blue Bell Park • College Station, Texas	L 4–5	35–12	16–6

May (6–2)

#	Date	Opponent	Rank	Site/stadium	Score	Overall record	Big 12 record
48	May 5	Oklahoma State	No. 7	Buck Beltzer Stadium • Lincoln, Nebraska	W 9–7	36–12	17–6
49	May 5	Oklahoma State	No. 7	Buck Beltzer Stadium • Lincoln, Nebraska	W 10–8	37–12	18–6
50	May 6	Oklahoma State	No. 7	Buck Beltzer Stadium • Lincoln, Nebraska	W 20–2	38–12	19–6
51	May 8	Northern Iowa	No. 5	Buck Beltzer Stadium • Lincoln, Nebraska	W 15–6	39–12	19–6
52	May 9	at Creighton	No. 5	Johnny Rosenblatt Stadium • Omaha, Nebraska	W 8–4	40–12	19–6
53	May 11	at Iowa State	No. 5	Cap Timm Field • Ames, Iowa	W 16–8	41–12	20–6
54	May 12	at Iowa State	No. 5	Cap Timm Field • Ames, Iowa	L 5–8	41–13	20–7
55	May 13	at Iowa State	No. 5	Cap Timm Field • Ames, Iowa	L 1–5	41–14	20–8

Postseason (9–2)
Big 12 Tournament (4–0)

#	Date	Opponent	Seed/Rank	Site/stadium	Score	Overall record	B12T record
56	May 16	vs. (8) Iowa State	(1) No. 5	AT&T Bricktown Ballpark • Oklahoma City, Oklahoma	W 5–2	42–14	1–0
57	May 17	vs. (5) Oklahoma State	(1) No. 5	AT&T Bricktown Ballpark • Oklahoma City, Oklahoma	W 7–1	43–14	2–0
58	May 19	vs. (5) Oklahoma State	(1) No. 5	AT&T Bricktown Ballpark • Oklahoma City, Oklahoma	W 10–5	44–14	3–0
59	May 20	vs. (6) Texas A&M	(1) No. 5	AT&T Bricktown Ballpark • Oklahoma City, Oklahoma	W 7–4	45–14	4–0

NCAA Lincoln Regional (3–0)

#	Date	Opponent	Seed/Rank	Site/stadium	Score	Overall record	NCAAT record
60	May 25	(4) Northern Iowa	(1) No. 3	Buck Beltzer Stadium • Lincoln, Nebraska	W 16–6	46–14	1–0
61	May 26	(2) Rutgers	(1) No. 3	Buck Beltzer Stadium • Lincoln, Nebraska	W 5–4	47–14	2–0
62	May 27	(2) Rutgers	(1) No. 3	Buck Beltzer Stadium • Lincoln, Nebraska	W 14–10	48–14	3–0

NCAA Lincoln Super Regional (2–0)

#	Date	Opponent	Seed/Rank	Site/stadium	Score	Overall record	NCAAT record
63	June 1	No. 16 Rice	(8) No. 3	Buck Beltzer Stadium • Lincoln, Nebraska	W 7–0	49–14	4–0
64	June 2	No. 16 Rice	(8) No. 3	Buck Beltzer Stadium • Lincoln, Nebraska	W 9–6	50–14	5–0

2001 College World Series (0–2)

#	Date	Opponent	Seed/Rank	Site/stadium	Score	Overall record	CWS record
65	June 8	vs. (1) No. 5 Cal State Fullerton	(8) No. 3	Johnny Rosenblatt Stadium • Omaha, Nebraska	L 4–5	50–15	0–1
66	June 10	vs. (5) No. 6 Tulane	(8) No. 3	Johnny Rosenblatt Stadium • Omaha, Nebraska	L 5–6	50–16	0–2

== Awards and honors ==
Jeff Blevins

- Honorable Mention All-Big 12

Jim Cole

- First Team All-Big 12
- First-Team All-American ABCA
- First-Team All-American Baseball America
- Second Team All-American The Sports Network
- Third Team All-American Collegiate Baseball

Matt Hopper

- First Team All-Big 12

Dan Johnson

- Second Team All-American American Baseball Coaches Association
- Second Team All-American Collegiate Baseball
- First Team All-Big 12

Shane Komine

- Second Team All-American American Baseball Coaches Association
- Second Team All-American Baseball America
- Second Team All-American The Sports Network
- Big 12 Conference Baseball Pitcher of the Year
- First Team All-Big 12

Jeff Leise

- Second Team All-Big 12

Jed Morris

- Second Team All-Big 12

Thom Ott

- First Team All-Big 12

Adam Stern

- Honorable Mention All-Big 12
