= Rays–Red Sox rivalry =

Major League Baseball rivalry

- Tampa Bay Rays Boston Red Sox
- Location: Eastern United States
- First meeting: June 12, 1998; Fenway Park, Boston, Massachusetts; Red Sox 5, Devil Rays 1
- Latest meeting: September 20, 2026; Tropicana Field, St. Petersburg, Florida; Rays 5, Red Sox 1
- Next meeting: April 12, 2027; Tropicana Field, St. Petersburg, Florida
- Stadiums: Rays: Tropicana Field; Red Sox: Fenway Park

Statistics
- Total meetings: 507
- All-time series: Red Sox, 272–235 (.536)
- Regular season series: Red Sox, 263–229 (.535)
- Postseason results: Red Sox, 9–6 (.600)
- Largest victory: Rays, 16–1 (April 14, 2025); Red Sox, 22–4 (July 23, 2002)
- Longest win streak: Rays, 6 (August 16–September 15, 2011; July 24–September 21, 2019; June 23–August 10, 2021; July 5–14, 2022); Red Sox, 11 (April 6–June 26, 2001)
- Current win streak: Rays, 2

Post-season history
- 2008 AL Championship Series: Rays won, 4–3; 2013 AL Division Series: Red Sox won, 3–1; 2021 AL Division Series: Red Sox won, 3–1

Locations of the Tampa Bay Rays and Boston Red Sox

Since 1998, the Tampa Bay Rays and Boston Red Sox have shared a rivalry within Major League Baseball. The rivalry intensified in 2008, after the two teams had their first postseason meeting in the ALCS. Since then, both teams have won the American League (AL) East division a combined seven times between 2008 and 2021. While the rivalry is more recent than the storied Red Sox–Yankees rivalry, it has been called one of the most competitive in modern baseball.

== History ==
=== 1998–2007: First meetings ===
After years of trying to lure a major league team, Tampa Bay was awarded an American League franchise in 1998. The Devil Rays would become the first expansion team to join the AL East since the Toronto Blue Jays in 1977. Their record that year was dismal, winning only 63 games. The Red Sox were far more successful, finishing 92–70 and taking a Wild Card berth; they took the season series against the Devil Rays 9–3.

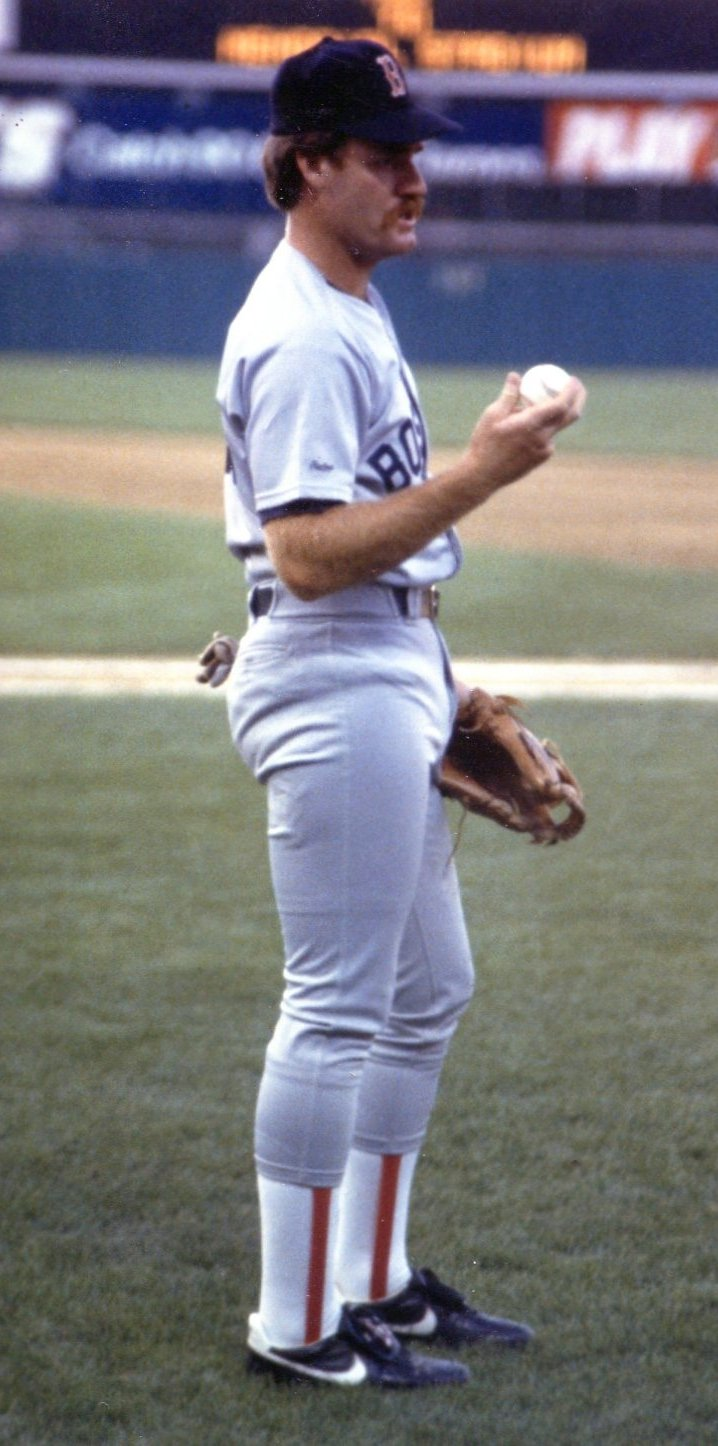
Wade Boggs was a crucial part of the 1980s Red Sox before joining the expansion Devil Rays

One bright spot for Tampa was third baseman Wade Boggs who, while batting .280/.348/.400 in 1998, turned out to be one of the most productive players on the team. Boggs' relationship with Boston was complicated; an eight-time All-Star with the Red Sox, his signing with the New York Yankees in 1993 earned him the scorn of some Boston fans, who booed him on his return to Fenway Park. Even after leaving New York to sign with the Devil Rays, Boggs continued to be met with boos in Boston. Boggs was also at the center of a controversy when rumors emerged that he had negotiated a bonus with the Devil Rays that would require him to request depiction in the Hall of Fame wearing a Devil Rays cap (though he denied the claims); he was ultimately inducted on the 2005 ballot wearing a Red Sox cap Boggs' number 12 was retired by the Rays in 2000, and his number 26 was retired by the Red Sox in 2016.

The teams' first confrontation came at Tropicana Field on August 29, 2000, when Devil Rays leadoff hitter Gerald Williams was hit by a pitch thrown by the Red Sox' Pedro Martínez. Williams charged the mound and landed a right hook on Martinez, leading to a benches-clearing brawl that ended with the ejection of Williams and manager Larry Rothschild (while Martínez remained in the game). Over the course of the game, six more Devil Rays were ejected (including three pitchers who threw at Red Sox batters in retaliation). For his part, Martínez would end up taking a no-hitter into the ninth inning. The brawl was not forgotten, however. When Tampa beat the Red Sox on September 29 and eliminated them from playoff contention, Devil Rays closer Roberto Hernandez sarcastically waved goodbye to the struck-out Trot Nixon and the rest of the Red Sox team while the Rays celebrated on the mound.

Early into the next season, an incident occurred where Nixon threw his bat at Rays pitcher Ryan Rupe, who had hit the Sox' Nomar Garciaparra and Shea Hillenbrand earlier in the inning. Red Sox pitcher Frank Castillo would go on to hit Devil Rays batter Randy Winn, after which the plate umpire issued warnings to both dugouts. Nixon and Castillo were suspended four and five games, respectively, while Rupe got away with a fine.

Brawls between the clubs would continue throughout the 2000s, even as the Devil Rays struggled while the Red Sox made four postseason appearances through 2007 (including two World Series titles, in 2004 and 2007). In 2005, the Red Sox hit Aubrey Huff, and the Devil Rays retaliated by throwing at Manny Ramirez and David Ortiz, causing a melee in which six players and both managers were ejected. The next day, Boston pitcher Curt Schilling made comments on a radio show criticizing Tampa manager Lou Piniella: "When you're playing a team with a manager who somehow forgot how the game is played, there's problems [...] Lou's trying to make his team be a bunch of tough guys, and the telling sign is when the players on that team are saying, 'This is why we lose a hundred games a year, because this idiot makes us do stuff like this.'" Piniella responded by saying, "If we're going to get thrown at, we're not going to tolerate that, either." In 2006, Red Sox pitcher Julián Tavárez, covering home plate, stepped on the arm of Devil Rays baserunner Joey Gathright and then punched him, inciting another brawl and earning him a ten game suspension.

=== 2008–2017: Playoff meetings ===
The Devil Rays rebranded themselves as the Rays before the 2008 season. That same year, their on-field fortunes would dramatically improve, bringing them into further conflict with the World Series-champion Red Sox. The anger between the teams was crystallized by a series of incidents in a June series, after Boston center fielder Coco Crisp slid hard into Tampa second baseman Akinori Iwamura; the next night, Rays pitcher James Shields drilled Crisp, inciting a benches-clearing brawl. In September, the Rays would win their first series at Fenway—something Peter Gammons called "a turning point in franchise history"—finishing the year with a 97–65 record and, displacing the heavily favored Red Sox, their first AL East title. Boston, having secured a wild card berth, met Tampa in the 2008 American League Championship Series. The Rays gained a 3–1 series lead, including a walk-off sacrifice fly by B.J. Upton in Game 2, but Boston came back (winning Game 5 after being down 7-0) to send the series to a seventh game. However the Rays won Game 7 3-1 in St. Petersburg, eliminating Boston and sending Tampa to its first World Series (which it would lose to the Philadelphia Phillies).

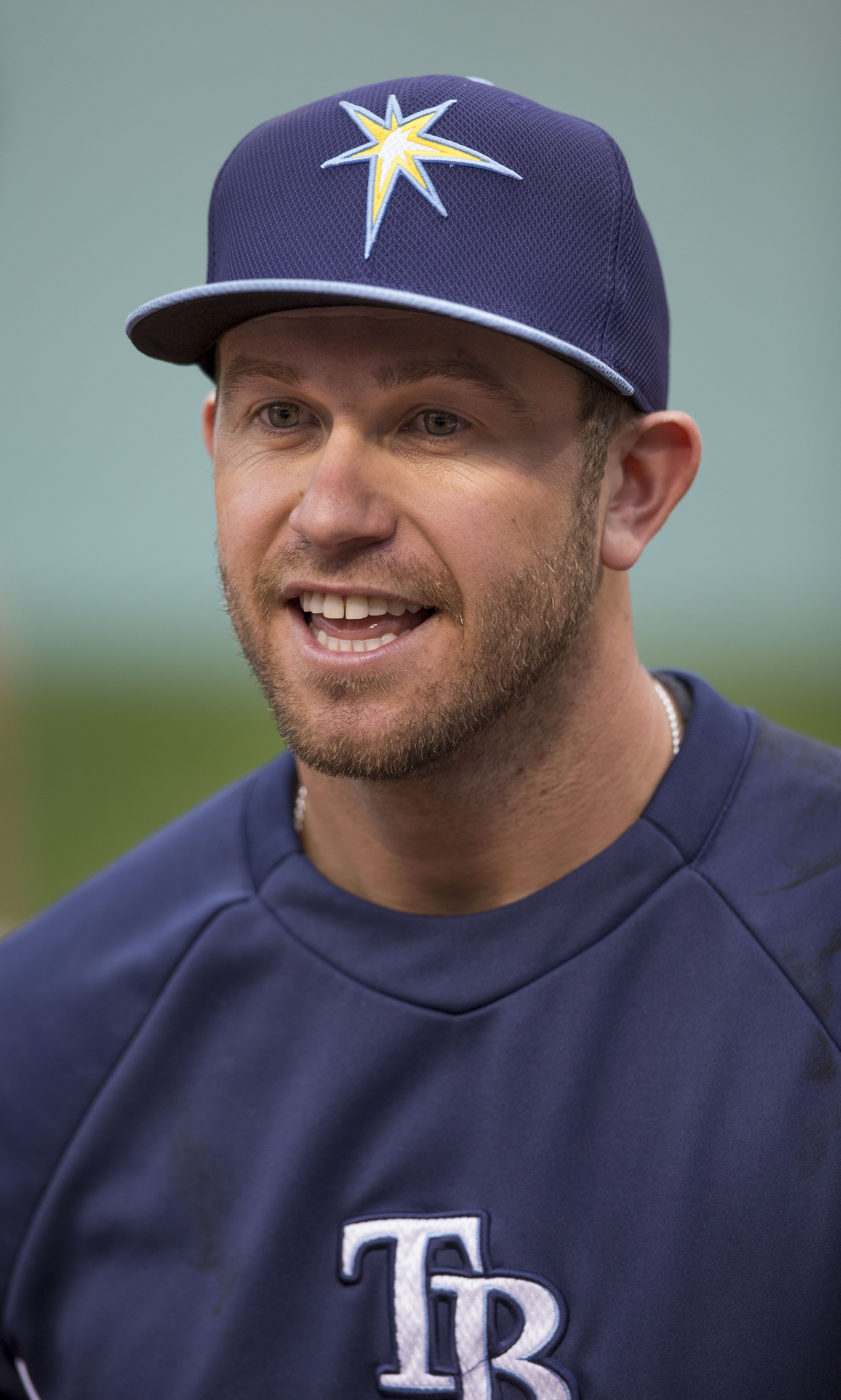
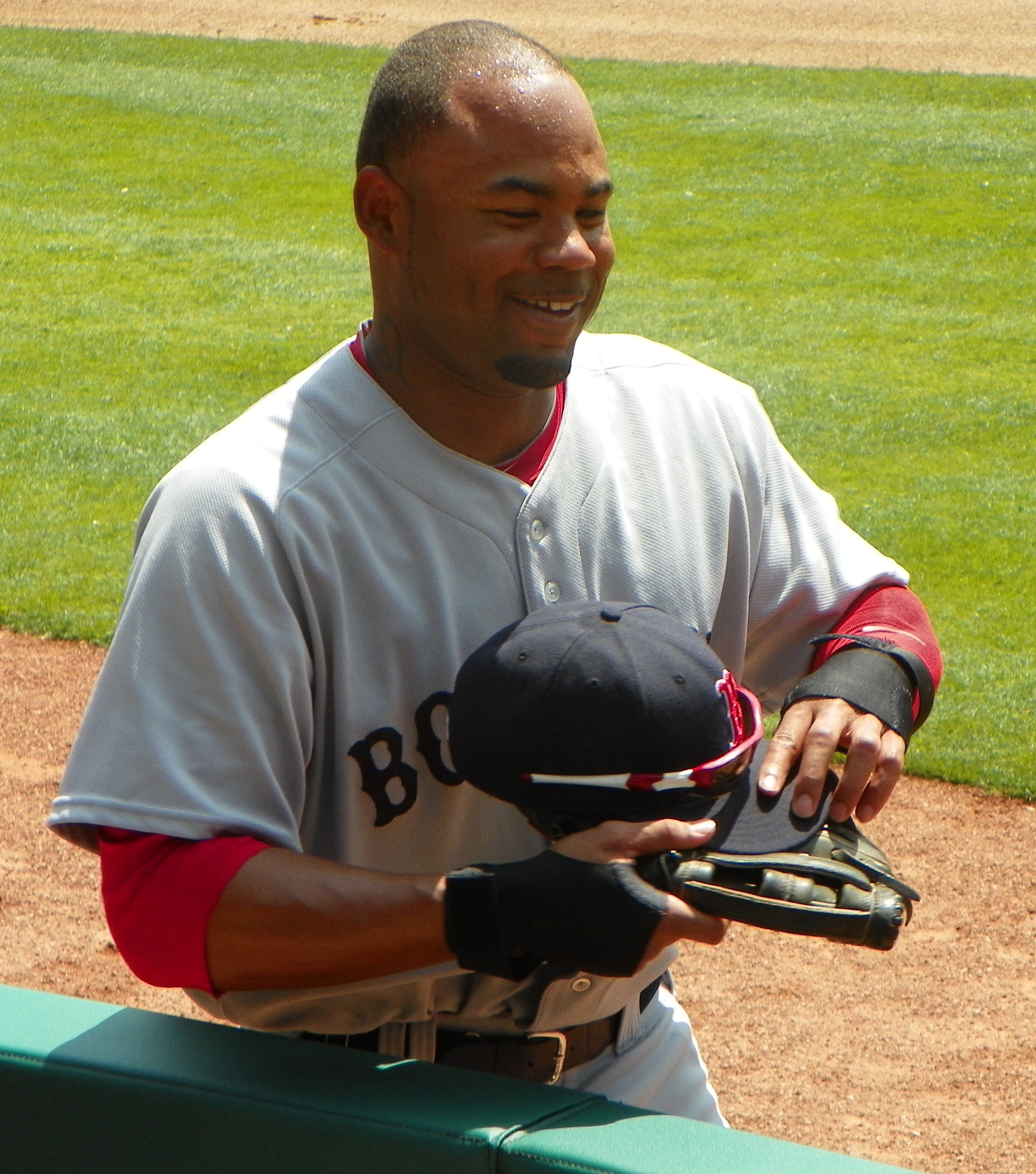
Evan Longoria (left) and Carl Crawford both figured prominently in the 2011 AL wild card chase; one as a Ray, the other as a Ray-turned-Red Sox

Though both teams failed to make deep postseason runs the following year (which saw the shared division rival New York Yankees win the World Series), the rivalry remained alive. The Rays recaptured their AL East title in 2010, while the Red Sox would be shut out of the postseason for the next two years. In 2011, Boston and Tampa were tied in a Wild Card race that came down to the last day of the season. Red Sox outfielder Carl Crawford (a former Rays All-Star) missed a fly ball to lose their game against Baltimore Orioles; Rays star Evan Longoria would go on to hit a walk-off home run against the Yankees to secure the Wild Card berth, and eliminate the Red Sox from playoff contention. Crawford was traded to Los Angeles the next year, after which he would call the environment in Boston "toxic."

In 2013, though, Boston saw a resurgence headlined by Ortiz and Dustin Pedroia (as well as former Ray Jonny Gomes). This year also saw several altercations. On June 10, Rays batter Matt Joyce exchanged choice words with Red Sox pitcher John Lackey after being thrown out at first, and benches cleared after Lackey hit Joyce in his next at-bat. On July 29, after a controversial Rays victory where umpire Jerry Meals incorrectly ruled a tying run out at home plate, the teams traded barbs on social media, with the Red Sox Twitter account saying it looked forward to playing "home games" at Tropicana Field in September (in reference to the Rays' notorious attendance issues). The teams met in the 2013 ALDS, which Boston won 3-1; the Red Sox would go on to win the 2013 World Series against St. Louis.

Confrontations continued into the 2010s, even as the Rays declined and ceded ground in the AL East to Toronto and Baltimore. Brawls erupted in two games of the 2014 season, on May 25 and May 30, leading to several ejections. On July 27 of the same year, Rays pitcher Chris Archer took exception to a home run celebration by David Ortiz at Tropicana Field, saying the Red sox slugger acted like he was "bigger than the game of baseball" and that Ortiz felt "like the show is all about him." Ortiz dismissed Archer's comments, saying the young rookie was "not the right guy to be saying that" since he had "only two days in the league." In the wake of the episode, manager Joe Maddon acknowledged the friction between the teams, saying "What did Don Drysdale say to the last guy he knocked down on his butt back in 1963? Nothing. He didn't say anything [...] Those kind of thoughts are kind of insinuated, put in play. Play the game."

=== 2018–present: Division battles and alternating postseasons ===
Boston won another World Series title in 2018, while Tampa again failed to make the postseason (despite posting a 90-win season). This was because the Red Sox had 108 wins for the division title, while the Wild Card spots went to the Yankees (with 100 wins) and the Athletics (with 97).

The next season, the situation was reversed. Tampa secured a Wild Card berth while Boston, the reigning WS champion, was shut out of the postseason. The Red Sox also failed to make the postseason in the shortened 2020 season, while the Rays won the division and the American League Pennant. Boston Globe sports columnist Dan Shaughnessy openly rooted against Tampa in the World Series, arguing that their small-market approach was "bad for baseball." Shaughnessy also accused the Rays of having "no diehard fans," saying that their success in the pandemic-altered postseason landscape was because "no big league team has had more practice playing in an empty ballpark." The Rays eventually lost to the Dodgers, headlined by former Red Sox outfielder Mookie Betts, in six games.

The Rays again won the division in 2021, with Boston defeating New York in the Wild Card game to meet Tampa in the Division Series. Several controversies erupted during the series. including after rumors emerged that the Rays, having won the first game at home 5–0, had ordered champagne for an expected series victory at Fenway Park. The Red Sox's Alex Verdugo said the move was disrespectful.

The first game, they’re over there eating popcorn, sitting on the field, chilling, talking. And then also, they’re telling the guys to get the champagne ready here and already ordering the stuff over. Just that little bit of disrespect like, ‘Wow, really? You guys think you’ve got it in the bag like that?’

Another controversy emerged in Game 3, when a batted ball from Ray Kevin Kiermaier was misplayed by Boston outfielder Hunter Renfroe (who formerly played for the Rays) and knocked into the bullpen, out of play. The play, which otherwise would have resulted in a go-ahead run for Tampa in extra innings, was ruled a ground rule double; Boston walked it off in the bottom of the inning. Boston also won Game 4 with a walkoff sacrifice fly to move on to the ALCS. The last two games of the series were Boston's first set of back-to-back walk-off wins in the postseason since the 2004 ALCS against the Yankees.

Chaim Bloom, formerly of the Rays front office, was hired as Boston's chief baseball officer in 2019, after the firing of Dave Dombrowski. Bloom was expected to restructure Boston's team along the same sabermetric philosophy that guided Tampa's front office. However, the expectation to turn the Red Sox into "Tampa Bay North" was not immediately successful, as the team endured dismal seasons in 2020 and 2022. Bloom's tenure has been criticized as relying on the same "small-market" philosophy as the Rays, especially given the departures of key players like Xander Bogaerts. Globe columnist Shaughnessy summed up the situation: "I hate the Rays because the Red Sox are trying to become the Rays." Bloom also missed out on free agent starting pitcher Zach Eflin in the 2022 offseason, who declined a three-year, $40-million deal with the Boston before signing the exact same deal with the Rays.

== Season-by-season results ==
Rays vs. Red Sox Season-by-Season Results
1990s (Red Sox, 13–12)

Season	Season series		at Tampa Bay Devil Rays	at Boston Red Sox	Overall series	Notes
1998	Red Sox	9‍–‍3	Red Sox, 4‍–‍2	Red Sox, 5‍–‍1	Red Sox; 9‍–‍3	Devil Rays' inaugural season
1999	Devil Rays	9‍–‍4	Devil Rays, 4‍–‍3	Devil Rays, 5‍–‍1	Red Sox; 13‍–‍12	Devil Rays' only season-series win between 1998‍–‍2007.

2000s (Red Sox, 118–69)

Season	Season series		at Tampa Bay (Devil) Rays	at Boston Red Sox	Overall series	Notes
2000	Tie	6‍–‍6	Devil Rays, 4‍–‍2	Red Sox, 4‍–‍2	Red Sox; 19‍–‍18	
2001	Red Sox	14‍–‍5	Red Sox, 7‍–‍2	Red Sox, 7‍–‍3	Red Sox; 33‍–‍23	MLB changes to an unbalanced schedule in 2001, resulting in 18‍–‍19 meetings per year.
2002	Red Sox	16‍–‍3	Red Sox, 10‍–‍0	Red Sox, 6‍–‍3	Red Sox; 49‍–‍26	
2003	Red Sox	12‍–‍7	Tie, 5‍–‍5	Red Sox, 7‍–‍2	Red Sox; 61‍–‍33	
2004	Red Sox	14‍–‍5	Red Sox, 6‍–‍3	Red Sox, 8‍–‍2	Red Sox; 75‍–‍38	Red Sox win 2004 World Series, their first since 1918.
2005	Red Sox	13‍–‍6	Devil Rays, 5‍–‍4	Red Sox, 9‍–‍1	Red Sox; 88‍–‍44	
2006	Red Sox	10‍–‍9	Devil Rays, 7‍–‍3	Red Sox, 7‍–‍2	Red Sox; 98‍–‍53	
2007	Red Sox	13‍–‍5	Red Sox, 6‍–‍3	Red Sox, 7‍–‍2	Red Sox; 111‍–‍58	Red Sox win 2007 World Series.
2008	Rays	10‍–‍8	Rays, 8‍–‍1	Red Sox, 7‍–‍2	Red Sox; 119‍–‍68	Devil Rays change their name to the Rays, Rays lose 2008 World Series
2008 ALCS	Rays	4‍–‍3	Tie, 2‍–‍2	Rays, 2‍–‍1	Red Sox; 122‍–‍72	First postseason meeting between the two teams.
2009	Tie	9‍–‍9	Rays, 6‍–‍3	Red Sox, 6‍–‍3	Red Sox; 131‍–‍81	

2010s (Red Sox, 96–95)

Season	Season series		at Tampa Bay Rays	at Boston Red Sox	Overall series	Notes
2010	Rays	11‍–‍7	Rays, 5‍–‍4	Rays, 6‍–‍3	Red Sox; 138‍–‍92	
2011	Rays	12‍–‍6	Rays, 5‍–‍4	Rays, 7‍–‍2	Red Sox; 144‍–‍104	Rays secure a Wild Card berth by virtue of winning their final game of the season and the Red Sox losing their final game. Red Sox miss playoffs despite having 9-game lead in September.
2012	Tie	9‍–‍9	Red Sox, 5‍–‍4	Rays, 5‍–‍4	Red Sox; 153‍–‍113	
2013	Red Sox	12‍–‍7	Red Sox, 6‍–‍3	Red Sox, 6‍–‍4	Red Sox; 165‍–‍120	Red Sox win 2013 World Series; Both AL and NL having balanced teams leads to a balanced schedule of 19 games per season.
2013 ALDS	Red Sox	3‍–‍1	Tie, 1‍–‍1	Red Sox, 2‍–‍0	Red Sox; 168‍–‍121	
2014	Rays	10‍–‍9	Rays, 7‍–‍3	Red Sox, 6‍–‍3	Red Sox; 177‍–‍131	
2015	Rays	10‍–‍9	Red Sox, 5‍–‍4	Rays, 6‍–‍4	Red Sox; 186‍–‍141	
2016	Red Sox	12‍–‍7	Red Sox, 6‍–‍4	Red Sox, 6‍–‍3	Red Sox; 198‍–‍148	
2017	Red Sox	11‍–‍8	Red Sox, 5‍–‍4	Red Sox, 6‍–‍4	Red Sox; 209‍–‍156	
2018	Red Sox	11‍–‍8	Tie, 5‍–‍5	Red Sox, 6‍–‍3	Red Sox; 220‍–‍164	Red Sox win 2018 World Series
2019	Rays	12‍–‍7	Red Sox, 6‍–‍4	Rays, 8‍–‍1	Red Sox; 227‍–‍176	

2020s (Rays, 59–45)

Season	Season series		at Tampa Bay Rays	at Boston Red Sox	Overall series	Notes
2020	Rays	7‍–‍3	Tie, 3‍–‍3	Rays, 4‍–‍0	Red Sox; 230‍–‍183	Season shortened to 60 games (with 10 meetings) due to COVID-19 pandemic. Rays lose 2020 World Series.
2021	Rays	11‍–‍8	Rays, 7‍–‍3	Red Sox, 5‍–‍4	Red Sox; 238‍–‍194	
2021 ALDS	Red Sox	3‍–‍1	Tie, 1‍–‍1	Red Sox, 2‍–‍0	Red Sox; 241‍–‍195	
2022	Rays	12‍–‍7	Rays, 9‍–‍1	Red Sox, 6‍–‍3	Red Sox; 248‍–‍207	
2023	Rays	11‍–‍2	Rays, 6‍–‍1	Rays, 5‍–‍1	Red Sox; 250‍–‍218	New schedule structure started this season to allow every team to play one series against every interleague team, shortening interdivisional meetings from 19 to 13 games.
2024	Rays	7‍–‍6	Red Sox, 4‍–‍2	Rays, 5‍–‍2	Red Sox; 256‍–‍225	
2025	Red Sox	10‍–‍3	Red Sox, 4‍–‍2	Red Sox, 6‍–‍1	Red Sox; 266‍–‍228	
2026	Rays	7‍–‍6	Rays, 5‍–‍1	Red Sox, 5‍–‍2	Red Sox; 272‍–‍235	Rays lose 2026 World Series.
2027	Tie	0‍–‍0	Upcoming at Rays, April 12‍–‍15, July 6‍–‍8	Upcoming at Red Sox, April 20‍–‍22, September 21‍–‍23	Red Sox; 272‍–‍235	

Summary of Results

Season	Season series		at Tampa Bay Rays	at Boston Red Sox	Notes
Regular season games	Red Sox	263‍–‍229	Rays, 128‍–‍120	Red Sox, 143‍–‍101	
Postseason games	Red Sox	9‍–‍6	Tie, 4‍–‍4	Red Sox, 5‍–‍2	
Postseason series	Red Sox	2‍–‍1	Tie, 0‍–‍0‍–‍3	Red Sox, 2‍–‍1	ALDS: 2013, 2021; ALCS: 2008
Regular and postseason	Red Sox	272‍–‍235	Rays, 132‍–‍124	Red Sox, 148‍–‍106	

== See also ==
- Major League Baseball rivalries
- Bruins-Lightning rivalry
