= 2001 Colonial Athletic Association baseball tournament =

American college baseball tournament

- Teams: 6
- Format: Double-elimination tournament
- Finals site: Coy Tillett Sr. Memorial Field; Manteo, North Carolina
- Champions: William & Mary (1st title)
- Winning coach: Jim Farr (1st title)
- MVP: Mike O'Kelly (William & Mary)

2001 Colonial Athletic Association baseball standings
	Conf.				Overall
Team	W		L	PCT	W		L	PCT
No. 11 East Carolina ‍†‍‍^{y}	19	–	2	.905	47	–	13	.783
No. 24 VCU ‍‍‍^{y}	12	–	8	.600	41	–	19	.683
William & Mary ‍‍‡‍^{y}	12	–	9	.571	35	–	20	.636
UNC Wilmington ‍‍‍	11	–	9	.550	33	–	22	.600
James Madison ‍‍‍	10	–	11	.476	36	–	23	.610
Richmond ‍‍‍	7	–	13	.350	27	–	26	.509
Old Dominion ‍‍‍	6	–	15	.286	19	–	37	.339
George Mason ‍‍‍	5	–	15	.250	21	–	32	.396
† – Conference champion ‡ – Tournament champion y – Invited to the NCAA tournament East Carolina and Richmond were ineligible for the Conference Tournament as they prepared to depart the conference. As of June 30, 2001; Rankings from Collegiate Baseball

The 2001 Colonial Athletic Association baseball tournament was held at Coy Tillett Sr. Memorial Field in Manteo, North Carolina, from May 15 through 19. The event determined the champion of the Colonial Athletic Association for the 2001 season. Second-seeded William & Mary won the tournament for the first time and earned the CAA's automatic bid to the 2001 NCAA Division I baseball tournament.

Entering the event, East Carolina had won the most championships, with seven. Old Dominion and Richmond had each won three, while George Mason had won twice.

== Format and seeding ==
The CAA's eligible teams were seeded one to six based on winning percentage from the conference's round robin regular season. They played a double-elimination tournament. East Carolina and Richmond were ineligible for the Conference Tournament as they prepared to leave the CAA.

Team	W	L	Pct.	GB	Seed
East Carolina	19	2	.905	—	—
VCU	12	8	.600	6.5	1
William & Mary	12	9	.571	7	2
UNC Wilmington	11	9	.550	7.5	3
James Madison	10	11	.476	9	4
Richmond	7	13	.350	11.5	—
Old Dominion	6	15	.286	13	5
George Mason	5	15	.250	13.5	6

== Bracket and results ==
Upper round 1
4	James Madison	15
5	Old Dominion	2
3	UNC Wilmington	8
6	George Mason	17
Lower round 1
5	Old Dominion	5
3	UNC Wilmington	9
4	James Madison	11
6	George Mason	1

Upper round 2
1	VCU	7
4	James Madison	6
2	William & Mary	9
6	George Mason	4
Lower round 2
3	UNC Wilmington	4
4	James Madison	8

Upper final
1	VCU	3
2	William & Mary	8
Lower final
1	VCU	4
4	James Madison	5

Final
2	William & Mary	2
4	James Madison	3

== Most Valuable Player ==
Mike O'Kelly was named Tournament Most Valuable Player. O'Kelly was a first baseman for William & Mary.
