= Tony Giarratano =

American baseball player (born 1982)

- Shortstop
- Born: November 29, 1982 (age 43); Queens, New York, U.S.
- Batted: Switch Threw: Right

MLB debut
- June 1, 2005, for the Detroit Tigers

Last MLB appearance
- June 25, 2005, for the Detroit Tigers

MLB statistics
- Batting average: .143
- Home runs: 1
- Runs batted in: 4
- Stats at Baseball Reference

Teams
- Detroit Tigers (2005)

Anthony James Giarratano (born November 29, 1982) is an Italian-American former Major League Baseball shortstop who played for the Detroit Tigers in 2005.

== College career ==
A native of Queens, New York, Giarratano attended Tulane University, where he played college baseball for the Green Wave. In 2½ seasons at Tulane, Giarratano recorded a .319 batting average and drove in 111 runs. He was named a first-team freshman All-American at second base in 2001 and was a Conference USA All-Star infielder in 2003. He was also named to the All-Tournament Team in the 2001 Conference USA Tournament, which Tulane won. In 2002, he played collegiate summer baseball with the Cotuit Kettleers of the Cape Cod Baseball League.

== Professional career ==
Giarratano was drafted by the Detroit Tigers in the third round of the 2003 amateur entry draft. He signed with Detroit on June 30 of 2003. After working his way through the Tigers minor league system, Tony made his major league debut on June 1, 2005. Giarratano appeared in 15 games for the Detroit Tigers; he recorded 6 hits, 1 home run, 4 RBIs, and had a .143 batting average in his rookie year.

Giarratano was placed on the disabled list in August of 2006 and remained on the DL for all of the 2007 season for shoulder and knee injuries. Giarratano was progressing well and on target to be ready for 2008 spring training. Then, in January 2008, he re-injured his throwing shoulder and was released by the Tigers on January 31, 2008.
