= Shane Komine =

American baseball player

- Pitcher
- Born: October 18, 1980 (age 45); Honolulu, Hawaii, U.S.
- Batted: Right Threw: Right

MLB debut
- July 30, 2006, for the Oakland Athletics

Last MLB appearance
- July 17, 2007, for the Oakland Athletics

MLB statistics
- Win–loss record: 0–0
- Earned run average: 4.86
- Strikeouts: 2
- Stats at Baseball Reference

Teams
- Oakland Athletics (2006–2007)

Shane Kenji Komine (born October 18, 1980) is an American former right-handed Major League Baseball pitcher. He made his major league debut against the Toronto Blue Jays on July 30, 2006 (6 IP, 1 ER, 4 BB, 1 K). He is the third American-born player of full Japanese ancestry in major league history, after Ryan Kurosaki and Lenn Sakata.

== Amateur career ==
Komine graduated from Kalani High School in Honolulu in 1998. He attended the University of Nebraska–Lincoln with a major in Physics from 1999–2002 and became the Cornhuskers' ace pitcher. After going 10-0 his senior year of 2002, he was drafted by the Oakland Athletics in the 9th round of the notorious "Moneyball" draft. While at Nebraska, Komine was a teammate of former A's first baseman Dan Johnson.

== Professional career ==
Komine spent the majority of his first pro years with the Double-A Midland RockHounds, having moderate success. An impressive run through July 2006 with Triple-A Sacramento earned him a call-up to the A's on July 26, replacing Sacramento teammate Jason Windsor.

On July 17, 2007, Komine got into a game in the 8th inning against the Texas Rangers with fellow Hawaiian Kurt Suzuki doing the catching. This marked the first time in Major League Baseball history that there was a battery where both the players were from Hawaii.

He is the 19th pitcher from Hawaii to have played in the major leagues and third player from Hawaii to play for the A's, after Ron Darling and Lenn Sakata. His teammate on the 2007 A's, Kurt Suzuki is also from Hawaii.

In 2009, Komine played for the independent Newark Bears.
