= 2001 Southland Conference baseball tournament =

- Teams: 6
- Format: Double-elimination
- Finals site: Vincent–Beck Stadium; Beaumont, Texas
- Champions: Texas–Arlington (1st title)
- Winning coach: Clay Gould (1st title)
- MVP: K. J. Hendricks (Texas–Arlington)

2001 Southland Conference baseball standings
	Conf.				Overall
Team	W		L	PCT	W		L	PCT
Northwestern State ‍†‍‍	19	–	8	.704	38	–	17	.691
Louisiana–Monroe ‍‍‍	17	–	10	.630	29	–	29	.500
Texas–Arlington ‍‍‡‍^{y}	15	–	11	.577	39	–	25	.609
Southwest Texas State ‍‍‍	15	–	11	.577	36	–	22	.621
Texas–San Antonio ‍‍‍	15	–	12	.556	30	–	29	.508
Lamar ‍‍‍	13	–	14	.481	37	–	24	.607
McNeese State ‍‍‍	12	–	15	.444	29	–	25	.537
Nicholls State ‍‍‍	12	–	15	.444	26	–	30	.464
Southeastern Louisiana ‍‍‍	8	–	19	.296	22	–	33	.400
Sam Houston State ‍‍‍	8	–	19	.296	19	–	31	.380
† – Conference champion ‡ – Tournament champion y – Invited to the NCAA tournament As of June 30, 2001; Rankings from Collegiate Baseball

The 2001 Southland Conference baseball tournament was held from May 16 to 19, 2001 to determine the champion of the Southland Conference in the sport of college baseball for the 2001 season. The event pitted the top six finishers from the conference's regular season in a double-elimination tournament held at Vincent–Beck Stadium, home field of Lamar in Beaumont, Texas. Third-seeded Texas–Arlington won their first championship and claimed the automatic bid to the 2001 NCAA Division I baseball tournament.

== Seeding and format ==
The top six finishers from the regular season were seeded one through six. They played a double-elimination tournament.

Team	W	L	T	Pct	Seed
Northwestern State	19	8	.704	—	1
Louisiana–Monroe	17	10	.630	2	2
Texas–Arlington	15	11	.577	3.5	3
Southwest Texas State	15	11	.577	3.5	4
UTSA	15	12	.556	4	5
Lamar	13	14	.481	6	6
McNeese State	12	15	.444	7	—
Nicholls State	12	15	.444	7	—
Southeastern Louisiana	8	19	.296	11	—
Sam Houston State	8	19	.296	11	—

== Bracket and results ==
First round
1	Northwestern State	6
6	Lamar	8
3	Texas–Arlington	7
4	Southwest Texas State	6
2	Louisiana–Monroe	2
5	UTSA	5

Second round
6	Lamar	5
4	Southwest Texas State	1
3	Texas–Arlington	6
5	UTSA	2
1	Northwestern State	7
2	Louisiana–Monroe	13

Third round
6	Lamar	1
3	Texas–Arlington	0
5	UTSA	0
2	Louisiana–Monroe	3

Semifinals
3	Texas–Arlington	5
2	Louisiana–Monroe	2

Final
6	Lamar	1	1
3	Texas–Arlington	3	3

== All-Tournament Team ==
The following players were named to the All-Tournament Team.

Pos.	Name	School
P	David Talamantez	Lamar
P	Michael Snapp	Texas–Arlington
C	Joel Alvarado	Texas–Arlington
1B	Micah Hoffpauir	Lamar
2B	Craig Martin	Texas–Arlington
3B	Mickey Hernandez	Lamar
SS	K. J. Hendricks	Texas–Arlington
OF	Scott Cadwallader	Louisiana–Monroe
OF	Kaleb Carter	Lamar
OF	Junior Ramirez	Texas–Arlington
DH	Wes Cooksey	Lamar

=== Most Valuable Player ===
K. J. Hendricks was named Tournament Most Valuable Player. Hendricks was a shortstop for Texas–Arlington.
