= 2001 West Coast Conference Baseball Championship Series =

Basketball Championship held in 2001

2001 West Coast Conference baseball tournament
- Teams: 4
- Format: Double-elimination
- Finals site: Eddy D. Field Stadium; Malibu, California
- Champions: Pepperdine (1st title)
- Winning coach: Frank Sanchez (1st title)

2001 West Coast Conference baseball standings
	Conf.				Overall
Team	W		L	PCT	W		L	PCT
West
No. 20 Pepperdine ^{x}‍‍‡‍^{y}	25	–	5	.833	42	–	18	.700
San Diego ‍‍‍	20	–	10	.667	34	–	21	.618
Saint Mary's ‍‍‍	10	–	20	.333	18	–	36	.333
Portland ‍‍‍	9	–	21	.300	20	–	34	.370
Coast
Gonzaga ^{x}‍‍‍	17	–	13	.567	28	–	26	.519
Santa Clara ^{x}‍‍‍	17	–	13	.567	23	–	33	.411
San Francisco ‍‍‍	14	–	16	.467	28	–	26	.519
Loyola Marymount ‍‍‍	8	–	22	.267	21	–	37	.362
x – Division champion ‡ – Championship Series champion y – Invited to the NCAA tournament As of June 30, 2001; Rankings from Collegiate Baseball

The 2001 West Coast Conference Baseball Championship Series was held on May 18–20, 2001 at Pepperdine's home field, Eddy D. Field Stadium in Malibu, California, and pitted the winners of the conference's two four-team divisions. The event determined the champion of the West Coast Conference for the 2001 NCAA Division I baseball season. Pepperdine won the series two games to one over Gonzaga and earned the league's automatic bid to the 2001 NCAA Division I baseball tournament.

== Seeding ==
Gonzaga claimed the berth for the Coast Division by winning the season series over Santa Clara two games to one.

Team	W–L	Pct	GB
West Division
Pepperdine	25–5	.833	—
San Diego	20–10	.667	5
Saint Mary's	10–20	.333	15
Portland	9–21	.300	16

Team	W–L–T	Pct	GB
Coast Division
Gonzaga	17–13	.567	—
Santa Clara	17–13	.567	—
San Francisco	14–16	.467	3
Loyola Marymount	8–22	.267	9

== Results ==
Game One

May 18, 2001
Team	R
Gonzaga	7
Pepperdine	6

Game Two

May 19, 2001
Team	R
Pepperdine	10
Gonzaga	0

Game Three

May 20, 2001
Team	R
Gonzaga	0
Pepperdine	8
