= 2001 Trans America Athletic Conference baseball tournament =

American college baseball tournament

- Teams: 6
- Format: Double-elimination
- Finals site: Alexander Brest Field; Jacksonville, FL
- Champions: UCF (5th title)
- Winning coach: Jay Bergman (5th title)
- MVP: Jeremy Kurella (UCF)

2001 Trans America Athletic Conference baseball standings
	Conf.				Overall
Team	W		L	PCT	W		L	PCT
No. 17 UCF ‍†‍‡‍^{y}	22	–	5	.815	51	–	14	.785
Stetson ‍‍‍^{y}	19	–	8	.704	43	–	17	.717
Jacksonville ‍‍‍^{y}	18	–	9	.667	39	–	25	.609
Campbell ‍‍‍	17	–	10	.630	33	–	21	.611
Florida Atlantic ‍‍‍	14	–	13	.519	36	–	24	.600
Troy State ‍‍‍	12	–	15	.444	27	–	28	.491
Samford ‍‍‍	12	–	15	.444	20	–	34	.370
Mercer ‍‍‍	10	–	17	.370	24	–	28	.462
Georgia State ‍‍‍	8	–	19	.296	20	–	35	.364
Jacksonville State ‍‍‍	3	–	24	.111	11	–	39	.220
† – Conference champion ‡ – Tournament champion y – Invited to the NCAA tournament As of June 30, 2001; Rankings from Collegiate Baseball

The 2001 Trans America Athletic Conference baseball tournament was held at Alexander Brest Field on the campus of Jacksonville University in Jacksonville, Florida, from May 16 through 19. UCF won its fifth tournament championship to earn the Trans America Athletic Conference's automatic bid to the 2001 NCAA Division I baseball tournament.

== Seeding ==
The top six teams (based on conference results) from the conference earn invites to the tournament.

Team	W	L	PCT	GB	Seed
UCF	22	5	.815	—	1
Stetson	19	8	.704	3	2
Jacksonville	18	9	.667	4	3
Campbell	17	10	.630	5	4
Florida Atlantic	14	13	.519	8	5
Troy State	12	15	.444	10	6
Samford	12	15	.444	10	—
Mercer	10	17	.370	12	—
Georgia State	8	19	.296	14	—
Jacksonville State	3	24	.111	19	—

== Results ==
First round
1	UCF	18
6	Troy State	1
3	Jacksonville	5
4	Campbell	1
2	Stetson	1
5	Florida Atlantic	2

Second round
1	UCF	8
4	Campbell	3
3	Jacksonville	3
5	Florida Atlantic	7
6	Troy State	5
2	Stetson	2

Third round
1	UCF	6^{10}
5	Florida Atlantic	5
3	Jacksonville	10
6	Troy State	6

Semifinals
5	Florida Atlantic	5
3	Jacksonville	12

Final
1	UCF	9	11
3	Jacksonville	10	2

== All-Tournament Team ==
The following players were named to the All-Tournament Team.

Pos	Name	Team
P	Justin Pope	UCF
P	Von Stertzbach	UCF
P	Burt Clark	UCF
P	Jason Arnold	UCF
C	Chad Oliva	Jacksonville
IF	Jeremy Kurella	UCF
IF	Mike Fox	UCF
IF	Chad Ehrnsberger	UCF
IF	Chris Reier	Jacksonville
OF	Phil Nover	Jacksonville
OF	Mike Myers	UCF
OF	B.J. Weed	Jacksonville

=== Tournament Most Valuable Player ===
Jeremy Kurella was named Tournament Most Valuable Player. Kurella was an infielder for UCF.
