= Thunderbird Park (Cedar City) =

Baseball venue in Utah, United States

- Interactive map of Thunderbird Park
- Location: West Center Street and N 800 W, Cedar City, Utah, United States
- Coordinates: 37.67666°N 113.074813°W
- Owner: Southern Utah University
- Operator: Southern Utah University
- Capacity: 500
- Surface: Natural grass
- Scoreboard: Electronic
- Field size: 345 feet (Left field); 385 feet (LCF); 410 feet (Center field); 385 feet (RCF); 330 feet (Right field)

Construction
- Demolished: 2012

Tenant
- Southern Utah Thunderbirds baseball (NCAA Division I Summit) (?-2012)

Thunderbird Park was a baseball venue in Cedar City, Utah, United States. It was home to the Southern Utah Thunderbirds baseball team. As part of the athletic program's move to the Big Sky Conference for the 2012–2013 season, Southern Utah's baseball program was discontinued. The venue had a capacity of 500 spectators.

Following the 2012 season, the baseball venue was demolished, and the area was converted to a soccer field.
