= 2011 Major League Baseball wild card chase =

Baseball playoff chase

The 2011 Major League Baseball wild card chase was a playoff chase involving the Boston Red Sox and Tampa Bay Rays in the American League and the Atlanta Braves and St. Louis Cardinals in the National League. It has become widely considered one of the greatest playoff races in baseball history. The last day of the season, September 28, 2011, is known throughout the league as Game 162 and is widely considered one of the greatest endings to a regular season in baseball history.

On September 2, the Red Sox and Braves led the American League and National League wild card races by 9 and 8 1/2 games, respectively. Over the next 24 games, the Red Sox went 7–17, while the Braves went 8–16; in the same timespan, the Rays and Cardinals each won 16 games to tie for the wild cards going into Game 162 on September 28, with the rallying teams both being set to host Game 163, if it was necessary. On September 28, the last day of the 2011 regular season, the postseason fate of these four teams fighting for two playoff spots across both leagues was decided.

In the American League, the Rays defeated their American League East division rivals, the New York Yankees, with dramatic home runs in the 9th inning by Dan Johnson and later in the 12th inning by Evan Longoria to win the American League wild card after the Baltimore Orioles defeated the Red Sox on a walk-off single. In the National League, the Cardinals defeated the Houston Astros to win the National League wild card after the Braves lost to the Philadelphia Phillies in 13 innings.

The Red Sox and Braves became the first teams in history to hold leads as large as eight games in September and miss the postseason. Sports Illustrated writer Tom Verducci called the events of September 28 "the most thrilling 129 minutes in baseball history." The Cardinals eventually rode the momentum of their win to win the NLDS and NLCS on their way to defeating the Texas Rangers for their 11th World Series title.

The 2011 season was the final season of the single wild card format, as MLB added second wild card teams to each league starting with the 2012 season.

== Background ==
The Rays and Cardinals both overcame deficits of over eight games in the standings on September 2 to tie the Red Sox and Braves, respectively, on September 27.

=== Wild Card standings after games played on September 2 ===
Wild Card team (Top team qualifies for postseason)
Team	W	L	Pct.	GB
Boston Red Sox	83	54	.606	—
Tampa Bay Rays	74	63	.540	9
Los Angeles Angels of Anaheim	74	64	.536	9½
Cleveland Indians	69	66	.511	13
Chicago White Sox	68	67	.504	14
Toronto Blue Jays	69	69	.500	14½
Oakland Athletics	62	76	.449	21½
Minnesota Twins	58	79	.423	25
Seattle Mariners	58	79	.423	25
Kansas City Royals	57	82	.410	27
Baltimore Orioles	55	81	.404	27½

Wild Card team (Top team qualifies for postseason)
Team	W	L	Pct.	GB
Atlanta Braves	81	56	.591	—
St. Louis Cardinals	73	65	.529	8½
San Francisco Giants	73	65	.529	8½
Cincinnati Reds	68	70	.493	13½
New York Mets	67	69	.493	13½
Los Angeles Dodgers	67	70	.489	14
Colorado Rockies	65	73	.471	16½
Washington Nationals	63	73	.463	17½
Pittsburgh Pirates	63	75	.457	18½
Florida Marlins	60	77	.438	21
San Diego Padres	60	78	.435	21½
Chicago Cubs	59	79	.428	22½
Houston Astros	47	91	.341	34½

=== Wild Card standings entering September 28 ===
Wild Card team (Top team qualifies for postseason)
Team	W	L	Pct.	GB
Boston Red Sox	90	71	.559	—
Tampa Bay Rays	90	71	.559	—
Los Angeles Angels of Anaheim	86	75	.534	4
Cleveland Indians	80	81	.497	10
Toronto Blue Jays	80	81	.497	10
Chicago White Sox	79	82	.491	11
Oakland Athletics	73	88	.453	17
Kansas City Royals	71	90	.441	19
Baltimore Orioles	68	93	.422	22
Seattle Mariners	67	94	.416	23
Minnesota Twins	62	99	.385	28

Wild Card team (Top team qualifies for postseason)
Team	W	L	Pct.	GB
Atlanta Braves	89	72	.553	—
St. Louis Cardinals	89	72	.553	—
San Francisco Giants	86	75	.534	3
Los Angeles Dodgers	81	79	.506	7½
Washington Nationals	79	81	.494	9½
Cincinnati Reds	79	82	.491	10
New York Mets	76	85	.472	13
Colorado Rockies	72	89	.447	17
Florida Marlins	72	89	.447	17
Pittsburgh Pirates	72	89	.447	17
Chicago Cubs	71	90	.441	18
San Diego Padres	70	91	.435	19
Houston Astros	56	105	.348	33

== American League Wild Card race ==
=== Boston Red Sox at Baltimore Orioles ===
Wednesday, September 28, 2011 – 7:05 pm (EDT) at Oriole Park at Camden Yards in Baltimore, Maryland

Team	1	2	3	4	5	6	7	8	9	R	H	E
Boston	0	0	1	1	1	0	0	0	0	3	11	0
Baltimore	0	0	2	0	0	0	0	0	2	4	7	2
WP: Jim Johnson (6–5) LP: Jonathan Papelbon (4–1); Home runs: BOS: Dustin Pedroia (21); BAL: J. J. Hardy (30); Attendance: 29,749; Notes: The game was delayed in the middle of the 7th for 1:26 due to rain

The Red Sox were favored by pundits to win the American League pennant prior to the start of the season due to acquisitions of Adrián González, Carl Crawford and Bobby Jenks. Despite a slow start, Boston darted to the top of the division during the summer months. Injuries plagued the team and they slowly lost first place to the Yankees, but were still in comfortable contention for the wild card. The month of September started an epic slump for the team where the team had allowed the Rays to get back into contention. However, Boston still controlled its own destiny going into their final series with the last place Orioles, but wound up having the season come down to the last game.

The Red Sox had taken a lead for a good part of the game, but the Orioles mounted a comeback. The game was interrupted by a rain delay in the middle of the 7th with Boston ahead 3–2. Dustin Pedroia’s solo home run in the fifth looked like the eventual game winner.

During this rain delay, Dan Shaughnessy proclaimed "I think the Rays are not going to win tonight. I think the one thing we have eliminated is that the Red Sox season is not going to end tonight. They live to play another day." when asked about the Rays' chances of overcoming their 7–0 deficit against the Yankees. This proclamation would instantly backfire on him, as mere seconds after he made this statement, the Rays walked in a run with the bases loaded to make the game 7-1, in what would end up being a six-run rally in the bottom of the eighth inning to cut their deficit to 7-6. By the time the game had resumed almost an hour and a half later, the Rays had tied the game at 7 on a two out home run in the bottom of the 9th inning and were in the top of the 10th inning.

The Orioles still trailed by a run going into the bottom of the 9th. When leading after eight innings, the Red Sox were 77–0 in 2011. Facing closer Jonathan Papelbon, Chris Davis and Nolan Reimold hit back-to-back doubles with two outs, which tied the game. The next batter, Robert Andino, hit a line drive to left field which Carl Crawford was unable to catch, allowing Reimold to score and the Orioles walked off with the win.

After the Orioles won, Andino, who had been a Red Sox killer of late, said, "End of season like this, to make Boston go home sad, crying, I'll take it all day."

=== New York Yankees at Tampa Bay Rays ===
Wednesday, September 28, 2011 – 7:10 pm (EDT) at Tropicana Field in St. Petersburg, Florida

Team	1	2	3	4	5	6	7	8	9	10	11	12	R	H	E
New York	1	4	0	1	1	0	0	0	0	0	0	0	7	9	1
Tampa Bay	0	0	0	0	0	0	0	6	1	0	0	1	8	10	1
WP: Jake McGee (5–2) LP: Scott Proctor (2–6); Home runs: NYY: Mark Teixeira 2 (39), Andruw Jones (13); TB: Evan Longoria 2 (31), Dan Johnson (2); Attendance: 29,518

The Yankees had already won the American League East several days prior to this contest. The Rays had been in third place behind both the Yankees and the Red Sox for much of the season. However, Boston had slowly started to lose many games in September due to poor starting and relief pitching, disappointing hitting from newly acquired free agent Carl Crawford throughout the year, and injuries to key players like Kevin Youkilis. The Rays, who had won the division in 2010, had lost many of their players to free agency, including Carl Crawford. Despite the losses, the Rays had crawled back into contention and faced the Yankees in the final series of the year.

Yankees manager Joe Girardi indicated that he would approach the final games so that the team's pitching staff would be set up for the 2011 ALDS against the Detroit Tigers. Suspicions rose to whether or not the Yankees would compete intensely due to them wanting to rest their aging players for the playoffs and to keep the Red Sox out, their fierce rivals whom they had a lopsided losing record to that season. Girardi indicated that many of his post-season pitchers would not be pitching that game. The Yankees, however, started the game strong by taking a 5–0 lead by the 2nd inning, which was punctuated by a grand slam by first baseman Mark Texiera. Their lead grew to 7–0, which they held as the game entered the bottom of the 8th inning. In the 8th inning, the Rays scored six runs, capped off by a three-run home run by Evan Longoria. In the bottom of the 9th inning, down to his final strike, struggling Rays first baseman Dan Johnson hit a solo home run near the right field foul pole to tie the game. Already depleted from wanting to get pitchers who were not going to be on the postseason roster in, the Yankees went into extra innings with struggling pitchers. During Tampa Bay's half of the 12th inning, Evan Longoria hit his second home run of the game, a walk-off home run that cleared a short wall near the left field foul pole to win the game for the Rays just minutes after the Orioles' victory over the Red Sox. The win clinched the American League Wild Card for the Rays.

Seat No. 10 in the first row behind the right-field foul pole has been painted white in honor of Dan Johnson's, game-tying, ninth-inning, pinch-hit blast during Game 162. They have also renamed the section beyond the left field foul pole "162 Landing" in honor of Longoria's game winning, 12th-inning home run.

== National League Wild Card race ==
The National League wild-card race came down to the fate of two games on the last day of the regular season.

=== St. Louis Cardinals at Houston Astros ===
Wednesday, September 28, 2011 – 7:05 pm (CDT) at Minute Maid Park in Houston, Texas

Team	1	2	3	4	5	6	7	8	9	R	H	E
St. Louis	5	0	1	0	1	0	0	0	1	8	12	0
Houston	0	0	0	0	0	0	0	0	0	0	2	1
WP: Chris Carpenter (11–9) LP: Brett Myers (7–14); Home runs: STL: Allen Craig (11); HOU: None; Attendance: 24,359

The National League Central had been a two-way race late into the season with the Cardinals and Milwaukee Brewers vying for contention. After the Reds had fallen off, the Brewers had clinched the division. The Cardinals battled back despite perennial all-star Albert Pujols serving on the disabled list and pitcher Adam Wainwright sitting out the entire year due to Tommy John surgery. Upon Pujols' return, the Cardinals came within one game by defeating the Astros under nine innings of dominant pitching by ace pitcher Chris Carpenter.

This game ended up being the odd one out of the four in two ways, as by virtue of its fast 2:20 duration, it ended an hour before the dramatic 37 minute span that the other three games ended at around midnight within (from 11:28 PM to 12:05 AM EDT, the Braves would give up the go-ahead run to lose their game, the Red Sox would blow their game and lose, and the Rays would walk-off to complete their comeback win), despite starting roughly an hour after the three other games, and by virtue of their blowout shutout win, the Cardinals were the only one of the four teams chasing a spot to not have a dramatic last-out comeback or last-out blown lead, as the Rays came back to score the game-tying run when they were a strike away from losing their game, the Braves gave up the game-tying run to blow their lead when they were an out away from winning their game, and the Red Sox gave up the game-tying run to blow their lead when they were a strike away from winning their game.

=== Philadelphia Phillies at Atlanta Braves ===
Wednesday, September 28, 2011 – 7:10 pm (EDT) at Turner Field in Atlanta, Georgia

Team	1	2	3	4	5	6	7	8	9	10	11	12	13	R	H	E
Philadelphia	1	0	0	0	0	0	1	0	1	0	0	0	1	4	11	0
Atlanta	1	0	2	0	0	0	0	0	0	0	0	0	0	3	10	1
WP: Justin De Fratus (1–0) LP: Scott Linebrink (4–4) Sv: David Herndon (1); Home runs: PHI: None; ATL: Dan Uggla (36); Attendance: 45,350

The Philadelphia Phillies had clinched a playoff berth, the division title, and the best league record for weeks. For most of the season, the Atlanta Braves had been in 2nd place in the National League East by a good margin and well ahead in the wild card standings.

The Phillies had something to play for, a franchise record in wins. They battled back from being an out away from losing to force the game into extra innings where they won and in effect, not only eliminated the Braves from post-season contention, but also set that record with 102, surpassing the previous record of 101 set back-to-back in 1976 and 1977 during their run of three straight division championships from 1976 to 1978.

Charlie Manuel also became the manager with most wins in the history of the Phillies with 646 wins, surpassing Gene Mauch, the manager of the Phillies when they collapsed in a similar way the Braves did in 1964.

== Simultaneous events ==
Some of the notable plays and events in the four games involved happened within minutes of the notable moments of other games involved, which can be seen when watching the four games simultaneously. Some examples include:

- The Braves taking a 3–1 lead over the Phillies on a two run home run by Dan Uggla minutes before the Orioles took a 2-1 lead on a two run home run by J.J. Hardy.
- The first pitch of the Cardinals-Astros game taking place just seconds after Hardy hit his two run home run.
- The Red Sox took a 3–2 lead on Dustin Pedroia’s solo shot mere seconds after the Yankees extended their lead to 6–0 on Mark Texiera’s solo home run (his second of the game).
- The Phillies and Rays both coming back from down 2–3 and 0–7 respectively to tie their games and force extra innings during the entirety of the Red Sox–Orioles rain delay (both teams were an out away from losing their games when the game tying plays in each game happened, with the Rays being a strike away).
- The Rays cutting their deficit down to one run on a three run home run by Evan Longoria minutes before the Cardinals won their game to guarantee at least a tie with the Braves.
- Greg Golson being tagged out at third by Evan Longoria on a fielder’s choice seconds before Chris Davis hit a two-out double off of Jonathan Papelbon on the first pitch he saw.
- Nolan Reimold hitting his game-tying ground rule double off of Papelbon on a 2–2 count to tie the game between the Orioles and Red Sox seconds after the Rays escaped the top of the 12th inning against the Yankees without allowing a run after allowing three base runners to reach base in the inning.
- Longoria hitting a walk-off home run to give the Rays the wild card with an 8–7 win roughly three minutes after Robert Andino hit his walk-off double to give the Orioles a 4–3 win over the Red Sox.

== Aftermath ==
The Rays would go on to lose the Division Series in four games to the Texas Rangers, winning only Game 1.

The Cardinals would go on to defeat the Phillies in the Division Series in five games after falling behind 2–1 in the series (ironically, the Phillies defeating the Braves in Game 162 had allowed St. Louis to clinch a wild card spot), beat their NL Central-rival Brewers in the League Championship Series in six games, and went on to win the World Series over the Rangers in seven games, twice coming back from being a strike away from losing the 2011 World Series in Game 6, which was won on a walk-off home run by David Freese.
