= 2001 Mid-Continent Conference baseball tournament =

- Teams: 4
- Format: Double-elimination
- Finals site: J. L. Johnson Stadium; Tulsa, Oklahoma
- Champions: Oral Roberts (4th title)
- Winning coach: Sunny Golloway (4th title)
- MVP: Trevor Leu (Oral Roberts)

2001 Mid-Continent Conference baseball standings
	Conf.						Overall
Team	W		L		T	PCT	W		L		T	PCT
Oral Roberts ‍†‍‡‍^{y}	24	–	1	–	0	.960	48	–	13	–	0	.787
Southern Utah ‍‍‍	19	–	9	–	0	.679	23	–	37	–	0	.383
Valparaiso ‍‍‍	14	–	10	–	0	.583	28	–	29	–	0	.491
Youngstown State ‍‍‍	12	–	15	–	0	.444	24	–	30	–	1	.445
IUPUI ‍‍‍	11	–	17	–	0	.393	17	–	37	–	0	.315
Western Illinois ‍‍‍	10	–	16	–	0	.385	12	–	38	–	0	.240
Chicago State ‍‍‍	8	–	18	–	0	.308	15	–	36	–	0	.294
Oakland ‍‍‍	7	–	19	–	0	.269	11	–	43	–	0	.204
‡ – Tournament champion y – Invited to the NCAA tournament As of June 30, 2001; Rankings from Collegiate Baseball

The 2001 Mid-Continent Conference Tournament took place from May 17 through 19. The top four regular season finishers from the regular season met in the double-elimination tournament held at J. L. Johnson Stadium on the campus of Oral Roberts University in Tulsa, Oklahoma. Oral Roberts won the tournament for the fourth time.

== Format and seeding ==
The top four finishers advanced to the tournament.

Team	W	L	Pct.	GB	Seed
Oral Roberts	24	1	.960	—	1
Southern Utah	19	9	.679	6.5	2
Valparaiso	14	10	.583	9.5	3
Youngstown State	12	15	.444	13	4
IUPUI	11	17	.393	14.5	—
Western Illinois	10	16	.385	14.5	—
Chicago State	8	18	.308	16.5	—
Oakland	7	19	.269	17.5	—

== Tournament ==
Upper round 1
1	Oral Roberts	10
4	Youngstown State	3
3	Valparaiso	4
2	Southern Utah	5
Lower round 1
4	Youngstown State	5
3	Valparaiso	7

Upper final
1	Oral Roberts	4
2	Southern Utah	2
Lower final
2	Southern Utah	14
3	Valparaiso	1

Final
1	Oral Roberts	13
2	Southern Utah	7

=== Game-by-game results ===
Game	Winner	Score	Loser	Comment
1	(1) Oral Roberts	10–3	(4) Youngstown State	
2	(2) Southern Utah	5–4	(3) Valparaiso	
3	(3) Valparaiso	7–5	(4) Youngstown State	Youngstown State eliminated
4	(1) Oral Roberts	4–2	(2) Southern Utah	
5	(2) Southern Utah	6–1	(3) Valparaiso	Valparaiso eliminated
6	(1) Oral Roberts	13–7	(2) Southern Utah	Oral Roberts wins Mid-Con Championship

== All-Tournament Team ==
Name	School
Doug Bernier	Oral Roberts
Keith Dickinson	Southern Utah
Erick Donaldson	Oral Roberts
Chad Grundy	Southern Utah
Travis Hatch	Southern Utah
Steve Holm	Oral Roberts
Curtis Jacobsen	Southern Utah
Trevor Leu	Oral Roberts
Chris Nelson	Southern Utah
Mark Pedersen	Valparaiso
Rene Recio	Oral Roberts
Kendall Schlabach	Youngstown State
Wilton Reynolds	Oral Roberts
Rick White	Southern Utah

=== Tournament Most Valuable Player ===
Trevor Leu of Oral Roberts was named Tournament MVP.
