= 2001 Big South Conference baseball tournament =

- Teams: 8
- Format: Double-elimination
- Finals site: Dan Daniel Memorial Park; Danville, Virginia
- Champions: Coastal Carolina (4th title)
- Winning coach: Gary Gilmore (1st title)
- MVP: Randy McGarvey (Coastal Carolina)

2001 Big South Conference baseball standings
	Conf.						Overall
Team	W		L		T	PCT	W		L		T	PCT
No. 29 Winthrop ‍†‍‍^{y}	18	–	3	–	0	.857	48	–	16	–	1	.746
Coastal Carolina ‍‍‡‍^{y}	16	–	4	–	0	.800	42	–	20	–	0	.677
Liberty ‍‍‍	14	–	7	–	0	.667	35	–	21	–	0	.625
Elon ‍‍‍	12	–	9	–	0	.571	30	–	27	–	0	.526
UNC Asheville ‍‍‍	8	–	12	–	0	.400	15	–	39	–	0	.278
High Point ‍‍‍	5	–	14	–	0	.263	21	–	33	–	0	.389
Radford ‍‍‍	5	–	16	–	0	.238	12	–	38	–	0	.240
Charleston Southern ‍‍‍	3	–	16	–	0	.158	13	–	37	–	0	.260
† – Conference champion ‡ – Tournament champion y – Invited to the NCAA tournament As of June 30, 2001; Rankings from Collegiate Baseball

The 2001 Big South Conference baseball tournament was the postseason baseball tournament for the Big South Conference, held from May 16 through 20 at Dan Daniel Memorial Park in Danville, Virginia. All eight teams participated in the double-elimination tournament. The champion, Coastal Carolina, won the title for the fourth time and earned an invitation to the 2001 NCAA Division I baseball tournament.

== Format ==
All teams qualified for the tournament. The teams were seeded one through eight based on conference winning percentage and played a double-elimination tournament.

Team	W	L	Pct.	GB	Seed
Winthrop	18	3	.857	—	1
Coastal Carolina	16	4	.800	1.5	2
Liberty	14	7	.667	4	3
Elon	12	9	.571	6	4
UNC Asheville	8	12	.400	9.5	5
High Point	5	14	.263	12	6
Radford	5	16	.238	13	7
Charleston Southern	3	16	.158	14	8

== Bracket and results ==
Upper round 1
1	Winthrop	7
8	Charleston Southern	2
4	Elon	3
5	UNC Asheville	2
3	Liberty	12
6	High Point	0
2	Coastal Carolina	13
7	Radford	6

Upper round 2
1	Winthrop	3
4	Elon	1
3	Liberty	2
2	Coastal Carolina	6
Lower round 1
8	Charleston Southern	3
5	UNC Asheville	4
6	High Point	7
7	Radford	2

Upper final
1	Winthrop	2
2	Coastal Carolina	0
Lower round 2
3	Liberty	12
5	UNC Asheville	3
4	Elon	20
6	High Point	3

Semifinals
1	Winthrop	1
3	Liberty	3
2	Coastal Carolina	7
4	Elon	4

Preliminary final
3	Liberty	0
2	Coastal Carolina	13

Final
1	Winthrop	2
2	Coastal Carolina	3

== All-Tournament Team ==
Name	School
Keith Butler	Liberty
Chris Carter	Coastal Carolina
Jeremy Herauf	Winthrop
Adam Kiem	Coastal Carolina
Todd Leathers	Winthrop
Randy McGarvey	Coastal Carolina
Trey Miller	Liberty
Curtis Moncus	UNC Asheville
Scott Sturkie	Coastal Carolina
Jim Swenson	Elon
Stas Swerdzewski	Winthrop
Jordan Webb	Winthrop

=== Most Valuable Player ===
Randy McGarvey was named Tournament Most Valuable Player. McGarvey was a catcher for Coastal Carolina.
