= 2001 Conference USA baseball tournament =

- Teams: 8
- Format: Eight-team double-elimination tournament
- Finals site: Zephyr Field; New Orleans, Louisiana
- Champions: Tulane (4th title)
- Winning coach: Rick Jones (4th title)
- MVP: Barth Melius (Tulane)

2001 Conference USA baseball standings
	Conf.				Overall
Team	W		L	PCT	W		L	PCT
No. 6 Tulane ‍†‍‡‍^{y}	21	–	6	.778	56	–	13	.812
Houston ‍‍‍^{y}	20	–	7	.741	29	–	30	.492
South Florida ‍‍‍	16	–	11	.593	33	–	31	.516
Cincinnati ‍‍‍	16	–	11	.593	34	–	24	.586
Memphis ‍‍‍	13	–	14	.481	34	–	24	.586
Louisville ‍‍‍	13	–	14	.481	32	–	29	.525
Southern Miss ‍‍‍	11	–	16	.407	27	–	32	.458
Charlotte ‍‍‍	10	–	17	.370	24	–	31	.436
Saint Louis ‍‍‍	9	–	18	.333	21	–	32	.396
UAB ‍‍‍	6	–	21	.222	25	–	30	.455
† – Conference champion ‡ – Tournament champion y – Invited to the NCAA tournament Rankings from Collegiate Baseball

The 2001 Conference USA baseball tournament was the 2001 postseason baseball championship of the NCAA Division I Conference USA, held at Zephyr Field in New Orleans, Louisiana, from May 16 through 20. Tulane defeated South Florida in the championship game, earning the conference's automatic bid to the 2001 NCAA Division I baseball tournament.

== Regular season results ==
Team	W	L	PCT	GB	Seed
Tulane	21	6	.778	-	1
Houston	20	7	.741	1	2
South Florida	16	11	.593	5	3
Cincinnati	16	11	.593	5	4
Memphis	13	14	.481	8	5
Louisville	13	14	.481	8	6
Southern Miss	11	16	.407	10	7
Charlotte	10	17	.370	11	8
Saint Louis	9	18	.333	12	--
UAB	6	21	.222	15	--

- Records reflect conference play only.

== Bracket ==
First round
**5**	**Memphis**	**8**
4	Cincinnati	5
**8**	**Charlotte**	**8**
1	Tulane	4
4	Cincinnati	7
**1**	**Tulane**	**9**
**7**	**Southern Miss**	**6**
2	Houston	2
6	Louisville	5
**3**	**South Florida**	**10**
**6**	**Louisville**	**6**
2	Houston	5

Second round
8	Charlotte	2
**5**	**Memphis**	**4**
8	Charlotte	2
**1**	**Tulane**	**6**
**7**	**Southern Miss**	**18**
3	South Florida	5
6	Louisville	3
**3**	**South Florida**	**7**

Semifinals
5	Memphis	6	2
**1**	**Tulane**	**7**	**7**
7	Southern Miss	4	4
**3**	**South Florida**	**6**	**7**

Final
3	South Florida	4
**1**	**Tulane**	**21**

- **Bold** indicates the winner of the game.
- Italics indicate that the team was eliminated from the tournament.

== All-tournament team ==
Position	Player	School
C	Scott Madden	Tulane
IF	Ben Drawdy	South Florida
IF	Mike Eylward	South Florida
IF	Anthony Giarratano	Tulane
IF	Jake Gautreau	Tulane
OF	Daniel Boyd	South Florida
OF	Bill Naharodny	South Florida
OF	Clint Stoy	Southern Miss
DH	Kris Courier	South Florida
SP	Beau Richardson	Tulane
RP	Barth Melius	Tulane
**MVP**	Barth Melius	Tulane
