= 2001 Ivy League Baseball Championship Series =

2001 Ivy League baseball tournament
- Teams: 2
- Format: Best of three series
- Finals site: Red Rolfe Field at Biondi Park; Hanover, NH
- Champions: Princeton (3rd title)
- Winning coach: Scott Bradley (2nd title)

2001 Ivy League baseball standings
	Conf.				Overall
Team	W		L	PCT	W		L	PCT
Lou Gehrig
Princeton ^{x}‍‍‡‍^{y}	14	–	6	.700	23	–	15	.605
Columbia ‍‍‍	10	–	10	.500	20	–	27	.426
Penn ‍‍‍	8	–	12	.400	22	–	18	.550
Cornell ‍‍‍	7	–	13	.350	12	–	26	.316
Red Rolfe
Dartmouth ^{x}‍‍‍	12	–	8	.600	22	–	18	.550
Brown ^{x}‍‍‍	12	–	8	.600	23	–	23	.500
Harvard ‍‍‍	11	–	9	.550	18	–	26	.409
Yale ‍‍‍	6	–	14	.300	12	–	22	.353
x – Division champion ‡ – Championship Series champion y – Invited to the NCAA tournament As of June 30, 2001; Rankings from Collegiate Baseball

The 2001 Ivy League Baseball Championship Series took place at Bill Clarke Field in Hanover, New Hampshire on May 5 and 6, 2001. The series matched the regular season champions of each of the league's two divisions. Princeton, the winner of the series, claimed their third title and the Ivy League's automatic berth in the 2001 NCAA Division I baseball tournament. It was Princeton's sixth appearance in the Championship Series, all of which were consecutive.

Dartmouth made their second appearance in the Championship Series, also losing to Princeton in 2000.

== Results ==
Finals
Princeton	5	16	6
Dartmouth	6	6	5
