= Dan Johnson (baseball) =

American baseball player (born 1979)

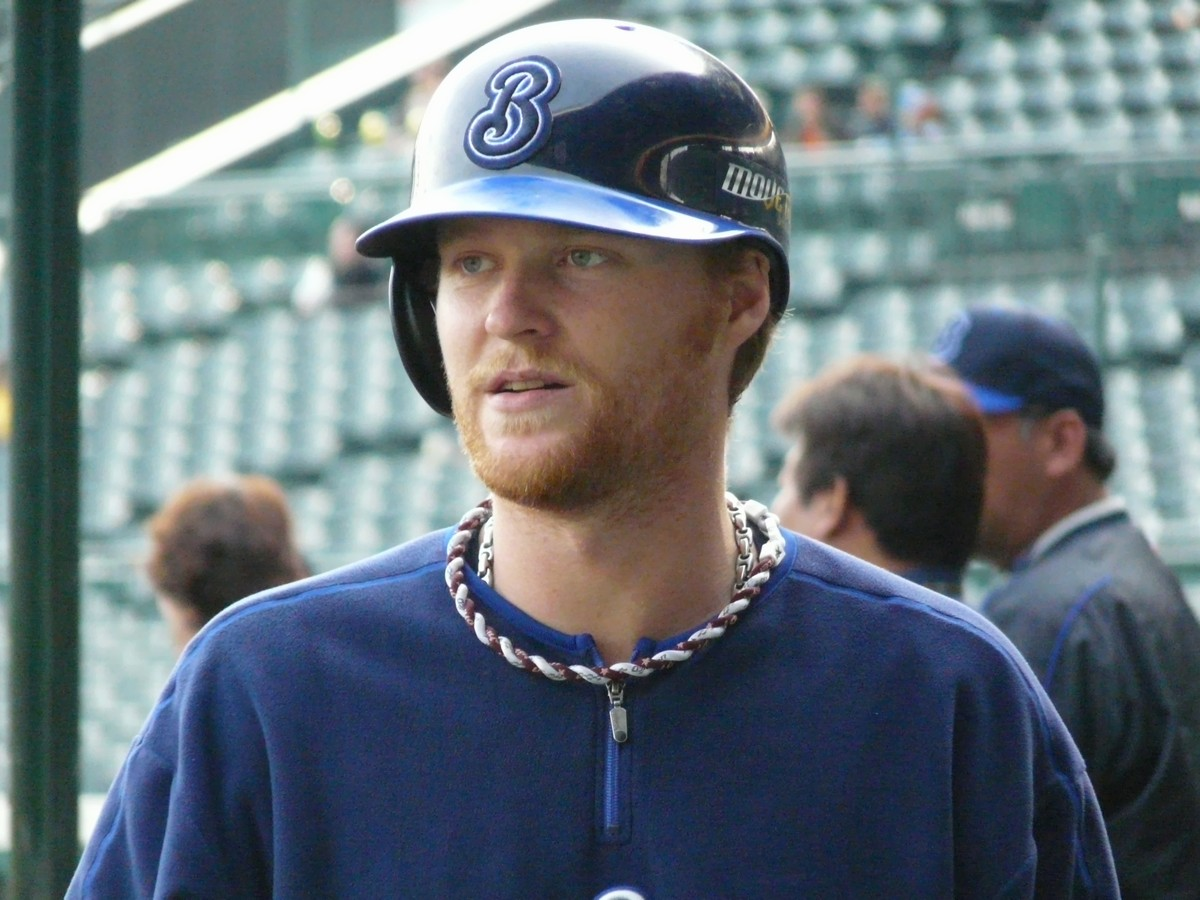
- Johnson with the Yokohama BayStars
- First baseman
- Born: August 10, 1979 (age 47); Coon Rapids, Minnesota, U.S.
- Batted: Left Threw: Right

Professional debut
- MLB: May 27, 2005, for the Oakland Athletics
- NPB: April 3, 2009, for the Yokohama BayStars

Last appearance
- MLB: July 28, 2015, for the St. Louis Cardinals
- NPB: October 2, 2009, for the Yokohama BayStars

MLB statistics
- Batting average: .234
- Home runs: 57
- Runs batted in: 203

NPB statistics
- Batting average: .215
- Home runs: 24
- Runs batted in: 57
- Stats at Baseball Reference

Teams
- Oakland Athletics (2005–2008); Tampa Bay Rays (2008); Yokohama BayStars (2009); Tampa Bay Rays (2010–2011); Chicago White Sox (2012); Baltimore Orioles (2013); Toronto Blue Jays (2014); St. Louis Cardinals (2015)

Daniel Ryan Johnson (born August 10, 1979) is an American former professional baseball first baseman. He played in Major League Baseball (MLB) for the Oakland Athletics, Tampa Bay Rays, Chicago White Sox, Baltimore Orioles, Toronto Blue Jays, and St. Louis Cardinals from 2005 to 2015. He also played in Nippon Professional Baseball (NPB) for the Yokohama BayStars in 2009.

Johnson is perhaps best known for hitting a dramatic two-out, two-strike home run for the Tampa Bay Rays in the bottom of the ninth inning of the last game of the 2011 season, also known as Wild Card Wednesday. That home run tied the game, which the Rays eventually won, sending them to the playoffs. His clutch hitting for the Rays, along with his red hair and beard, earned him the nickname "The Great Pumpkin".

Also within his extensive Minor League Baseball career that began in 2001, Johnson has won a Most Valuable Player (MVP) award in two different Triple-A leagues. He won the Pacific Coast League MVP in 2004 and the International League MVP in 2010.

In 2016, Johnson signed with the Rays organization, entering spring training as a knuckleball pitcher.

== High school and college ==
Johnson graduated from Blaine High School, in Blaine, Minnesota in 1997. He then attended Butler University for his freshman year, when he was named All-Conference in the Midwestern Collegiate Conference. He transferred to a junior college, and finally ended up at the University of Nebraska–Lincoln, where he helped the Cornhuskers make a College World Series appearance, and earned All-American honors.

== Professional career ==
=== Oakland Athletics ===
Johnson played his rookie season with the Athletics in 2005, batting .275 with 15 home runs and 58 RBI. He struggled early in 2006, batting .237 before being demoted to the A's Triple-A Pacific Coast League affiliate, the Sacramento River Cats, in July. He returned to the A's roster on August 31, and finished the season with a .234 batting average, nine home runs, and 37 RBI. It was later discovered that he suffered from double vision due to getting suntan lotion in his eyes, and he was able to clear up the problem for the 2007 season.

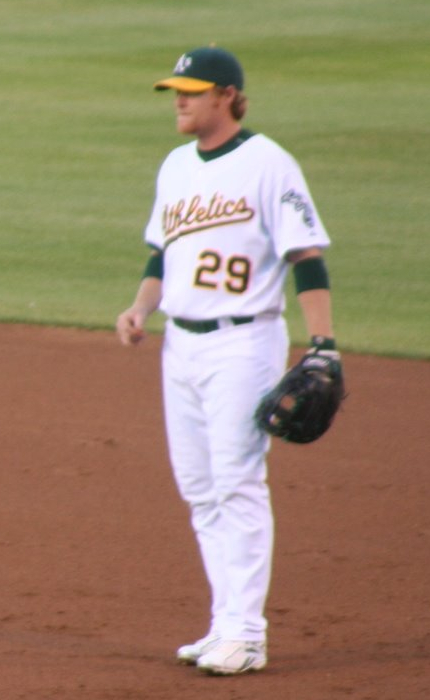
Johnson playing for the Oakland Athletics in 2007.

Johnson was expected to be the A's starting first baseman in 2007, but suffered a torn labrum in his hip late in spring training and missed the first three weeks of the season. He returned April 25 and proceeded to get a hit in 16 of his first 18 games. He was named American League co-Player of the Week with teammate Jack Cust for the week of May 7–13. After the hot start, Johnson fell into a slump that lasted the rest of the season and plummeted his batting average to .236. His worst month was July, in which he batted just .156 (10-for-64 in 19 games) with two home runs and eight runs batted in. On April 9, 2008, Johnson was designated for assignment.

=== Tampa Bay Rays ===
On April 18, 2008, he was claimed off waivers by the Tampa Bay Rays. However, five days later he was again designated for assignment. He was subsequently outrighted to Triple-A Durham three days later. On September 9, Johnson was called up by the Rays from Durham. He entered the game as a pinch hitter in the ninth inning, and hit a home run against the Boston Red Sox, tying the game. The game was viewed as pivotal in the AL East Division race, as the Rays would go on to win in extra innings, keeping the Red Sox from claiming the division lead that night. The Rays would not relinquish first place for the remainder of the season, and went on to win their first division title in franchise history en route to an American league pennant and an appearance in the World Series.

He batted .192 with a .276 on-base percentage for the 2008 season.

=== Yokohama BayStars ===
On January 10, 2009, Johnson signed a one-year, $1.2 million contract with the Yokohama DeNA BayStars of Nippon Professional Baseball. Johnson made 117 appearances for Yokohama, batting .215/.330/.462 with 24 home runs and 57 RBI.

=== Tampa Bay Rays (second stint) ===
On January 11, 2010, Johnson signed a one-year $500,000 major league contract with the Tampa Bay Rays. Johnson was called up from Durham to the Rays in August 2010. On August 28, he hit a walk-off home run in the 10th inning against the Boston Red Sox. Johnson batted just below the Mendoza Line for the 2010 season, with a .198 batting average. He had 23 RBI, 22 hits in 111 at-bats, three doubles, and seven home runs.

On April 8, 2011, with the Rays trailing 7–6 against the Chicago White Sox and two men on, Johnson hit the first pitch from Matt Thornton off the top of the Miller Lite Bullpen Sports Bar fence for a three-run home run, which would later prove to be the game-winner as Tampa Bay beat Chicago 9–7. On May 20, Johnson was designated for assignment by the Rays; he was added back to the team's active roster on September 14. On September 28, with the Rays tied with the Boston Red Sox in the American League wild card race in the final game of the season, Johnson hit a pinch-hit home run with two outs and two strikes in the bottom of the ninth inning to tie the game against the New York Yankees. It was the first hit for Johnson since April 27. The Rays went on to win the game in extra innings, and coupled with a loss by the Red Sox, clinched the AL Wild Card.

Johnson was honored by MLB for his Game 162 home run with the GIBBY (Greatness in Baseball Yearly) 2011 Moment of the Year Award This Year in Baseball Awards. Bill Chastain wrote, "Many baseball experts have called the final night of the 2011 season the best in baseball history." The seat at Tropicana Field in the right field corner where the home run ball landed (Section 140, Row T, Seat 10) is now colored white and known as the Dan Johnson seat.

=== Chicago White Sox ===
On February 1, 2012, Johnson signed a minor league contract with the Chicago White Sox that included an invitation to spring training. He was assigned to the Triple-A Charlotte Knights to begin the season. Johnson represented the Knights in the Triple-A All-Star Game in Buffalo, New York, and finished second in the home-run derby. His contract was purchased by the Chicago White Sox on September 1. As background to this move Chicago sports writers recalled Johnson's home run in game 162 for the Tampa Bay Rays. A season ago, Johnson changed baseball's landscape wrote Chicago Tribune writer, Phil Rogers. He made 14 appearances for Chicago, hitting .364/.548/.818 with three home runs and six RBI. On November 30, Johnson was non-tendered by the White Sox and became a free agent.

=== New York Yankees ===
On January 24, 2013, Johnson signed a minor league contract with the New York Yankees that included an invitation to spring training. He was assigned to the Yankees' Triple-A affiliate, the Scranton/Wilkes-Barre RailRiders, to begin the season; in 133 appearances, he batted .253/.379/.447 with 21 home runs and 69 RBI. Johnson was released by the Yankees organization on August 30.

=== Baltimore Orioles ===
On August 30, 2013, Johnson signed a minor league contract with the Baltimore Orioles. He played in five games for the Triple-A Norfolk Tides. On September 13, the Orioles selected Johnson's contract, adding him to their active roster. In three appearances for Baltimore, he failed to record a hit across five plate appearances. On October 31, Johnson was removed from the 40-man roster and sent outright to Norfolk. He elected free agency on November 1.

=== Toronto Blue Jays ===
On November 15, 2013, the Toronto Blue Jays announced that they had signed Johnson to a minor league contract with an invitation to spring training. His contract was selected from the Triple-A Buffalo Bisons on July 11, 2014, to replace Adam Lind who had been placed on the disabled list. In his Blue Jays debut that night, he walked in all 4 of his plate appearances and scored 3 runs. On July 26, Johnson recorded 4 RBI to help the Blue Jays end a 17-game losing streak at Yankee Stadium. He was placed on the 15-day DL on July 31 and was activated on September 1 when the rosters expanded. In 2014, Johnson batted .211 with 1 home run and 7 RBI. Johnson was sent outright to Buffalo on October 1, but elected to become a free agent.

=== Cincinnati Reds ===
On December 15, 2014, Johnson signed a minor league contract with the Houston Astros. After batting .158 over 19 at-bats in spring training, he was traded to the Cincinnati Reds for a player to be named later or cash considerations. He started the 2015 season with the Triple-A Louisville Bats, but was released on April 23.

=== St. Louis Cardinals ===
On May 4, 2015, Johnson signed a minor-league contract with the St. Louis Cardinals, who called him up to their MLB roster on July 8. He played his first two months in the Cardinals organization for the Triple-A Memphis Redbirds, batting .265 with 11 home runs and 42 RBI. He played 12 games for the Cardinals, collecting three hits in 19 AB. The club designated him for assignment on July 30 after trading for Brandon Moss, and outrighted Johnson off the 40-man roster to Memphis on August 3.

=== Bridgeport Bluefish ===
On March 5, 2016, Johnson signed a minor league contract with the Tampa Bay Rays, with the intention to convert from a first baseman into a knuckleball pitcher. He was released on March 30.

On April 8, 2016, Johnson signed with the Bridgeport Bluefish of the Atlantic League of Professional Baseball. He was profiled in the New York Times "A Veteran Retools as a Knuckleballer" on May 14. In 43 appearances for the Bluefish, Johnson hit .223/.297/.381 with five home runs and 27 RBI; in five outings (four starts) as a pitcher, he compiled an 0–2 record and 7.50 ERA with 14 strikeouts.

=== Long Island Ducks ===
On June 13, 2016, Johnson was traded to the Long Island Ducks of the Atlantic League of Professional Baseball. In 15 appearances for the Ducks, he batted .217/.357/.370 with two home runs and seven RBI. Johnson was released by Long Island on June 29.

=== St. Paul Saints ===
On July 8, 2016, Johnson signed with the St. Paul Saints of the American Association of Professional Baseball. In seven starts as a pitcher, he posted a 4–3 record and 4.50 ERA with 27 strikeouts; in 25 games as the Saints' primary first baseman, he batted .277/.373/.554 with six home runs and 15 RBI.

=== Los Angeles Dodgers ===
On August 22, 2016, Johnson signed a minor league contract with the Los Angeles Dodgers and was assigned to the Double-A Tulsa Drillers of the Texas League. He pitched in four games for the Drillers, logging a 5.52 ERA with 10 strikeouts in 14 2/3 innings. Johnson was also occasionally used as a pinch hitter, where he was 1-for-5 (.200) with five walks.

=== Pericos de Puebla ===
On May 15, 2017, Johnson signed with the Pericos de Puebla of the Mexican League, serving as both a designated hitter and a starting pitcher for the club. In 34 appearances for Puebla, he slashed .298/.426/.553 with seven home runs and 22 RBI; in two starts for the team, he registered a 1–1 record and 7.50 ERA with no strikeouts in six innings of work. Johnson was released by the Pericos on July 1.

=== Bravos de León ===
On July 1, 2017, Johnson signed with the Bravos de León of the Mexican League. In 30 appearances for the team, he batted .344/.519/.624 with six home runs and 35 RBI.

=== St. Paul Saints ===
On August 20, 2017, Johnson signed with the St. Paul Saints of the American Association of Independent Professional Baseball. Johnson was listed as a rookie status pitcher, and posted a .346/.478/.615 batting line with three home runs and 12 RBI over 15 games as a batter.

=== Bravos de León (second stint) ===
Johnson appeared in 13 games for the Bravos de León of the Mexican League in 2018, batting .208 with three home runs and nine RBI, before he was placed on the team's reserve list.

=== St. Paul Saints (second stint) ===
Johnson later returned to the St. Paul Saints on June 14, 2018, as a pitcher following another short stint in the Mexican League. However, he was released just a week later on June 21. He re-signed with the team on July 2, and struggled to an 0–1 record and 9.00 ERA with five strikeouts over eight innings of work. In nine appearances as a batter, Johnson slashed .158/.357/.211 with three RBI.

=== Lincoln Saltdogs ===
On July 14, 2018, Johnson was traded to the Lincoln Saltdogs. In four appearances (two starts), he compiled a 1–0 record and 2.57 ERA with 13 strikeouts and one save across 21 innings; in 27 games as a hitter, he batted .250/.330/.319 with one home run and nine RBI. Johnson was released following the season on October 11.

== Coaching career ==
In August 2019, Johnson joined the University of Nebraska–Lincoln baseball staff as a student assistant.
