= List of UCF Knights baseball seasons =

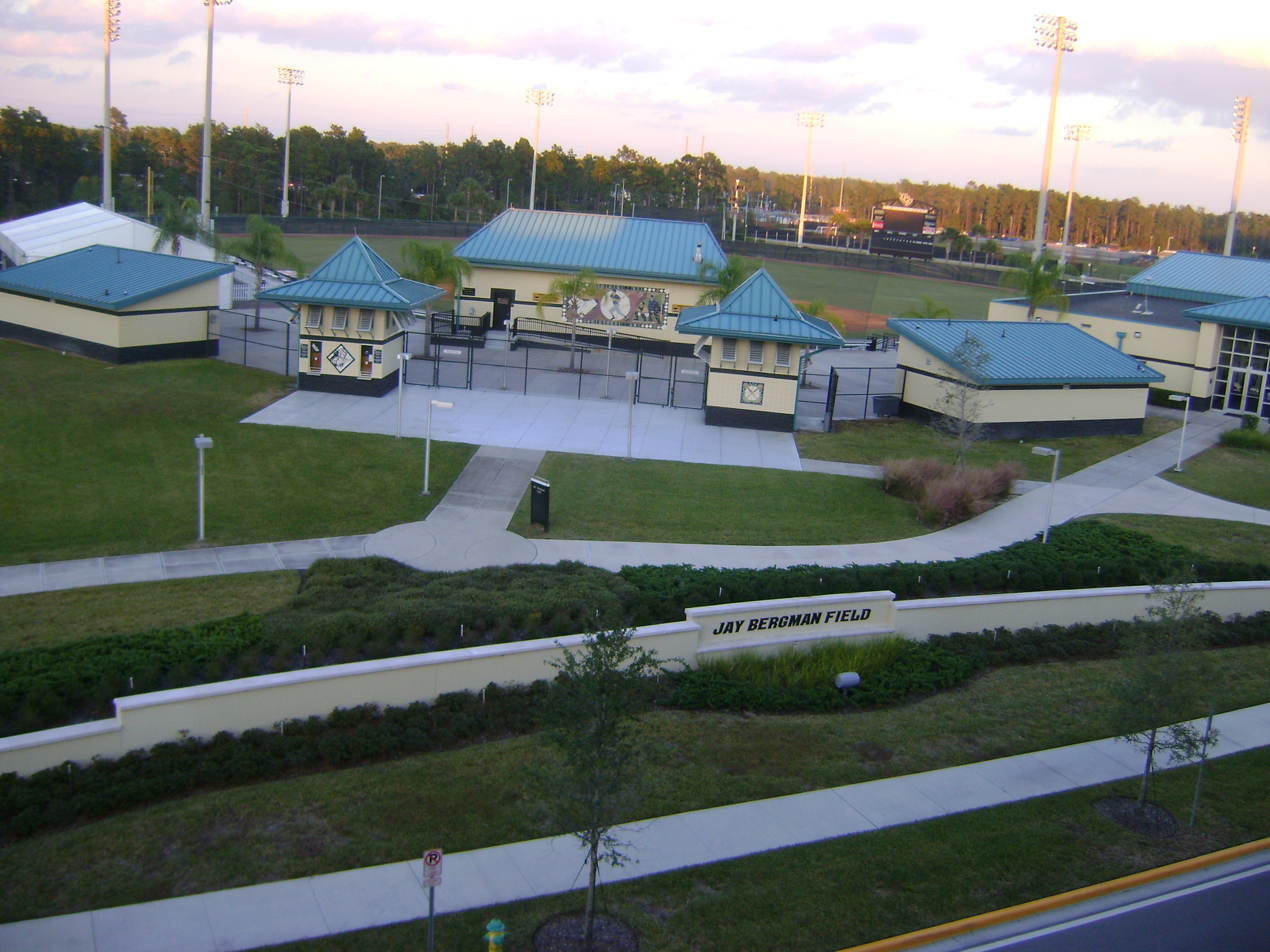
John Euliano Park

This is a list of UCF Knights baseball seasons. The UCF Knights baseball team competes in the National Collegiate Athletic Association (NCAA) and are a member of the Big 12 Conference. The Knights play their home games at John Euliano Park, which is located on the main campus of UCF in Orlando, Florida.

From 1963 to 1978, the University of Central Florida (UCF) was known as Florida Technological University (FTU). The University of Central Florida first fielded a varsity baseball team in fall 1970 under Jack Pantelias. Known as the FTU Goldsox, they played in the Amateur Baseball League of Central Florida until the team joined the NCAA for the 1973 season under head coach Doug Holmquist. The Knights ascended to Division I in 1985 under Jay Bergman.

Since its first NCAA season in 1973, the Knights have won seven conference championships and appeared in the NCAA tournament twelve times.

== Season results ==
National champions	College World Series berth	NCAA tournament berth	Conference Tournament champions	Conference/Division Regular season Champions

Season	Head coach	Conference	Season results									Tournament results		Final poll (Note: Collegiate Baseball began team rankings in 1959.)
Season	Head coach	Conference	Overall				Conference					Conference	Postseason (Note: Postseason play involving the NCAA Division I Baseball Championship began in 1947.)	CB
Season	Head coach	Conference	Wins	Losses	Ties	%	Wins	Losses	Ties	%	Finish	Conference	Postseason	CB
UCF Knights
1973	Doug Holmquist	Independent	16	15	1	.516	—	—	—	—	—	—	—	
1974	Doug Holmquist	Independent	21	16	0	.568	—	—	—	—	—	—	—	
1975	Doug Holmquist	Independent	29	10	0	.744	—	—	—	—	—	—	—	
1976	Jack Sexton	Independent	19	23	0	.452	—	—	—	—	—	—	—	
1977	Jack Sexton	Independent	24	18	0	.571	—	—	—	—	—	—	—	
1978	Bill Moon	Sunshine State Conference	22	24	0	.478	3	12	0	.200			—	
1979	Bill Moon	Sunshine State Conference	27	16	0	.628	10	5	0	.667			—	
1980	Bill Moon	Sunshine State Conference	25	23	0	.521	6	8	0	.429			—	
1981	Bill Moon	Sunshine State Conference	31	23	3	.570	4	11	0	.267			—	
1982	Bill Moon	Sunshine State Conference	19	24	3	.446	6	15	0	.286			—	
1983	Jay Bergman	Sunshine State Conference	28	27	1	.509	11	10	0	.524			—	
1984	Jay Bergman	Sunshine State Conference	34	29	1	.539	9	19	0	.321			—	
1985	Jay Bergman	Independent	52	34	1	.603	—	—	—	—	—	—	—	
1986	Jay Bergman	Independent	46	13	0	.780	—	—	—	—	—	—	—	
1987	Jay Bergman	Independent	33	27	0	.550	—	—	—	—	—	—	—	
1988	Jay Bergman	Independent	40	20	0	.667	—	—	—	—	—	—	—	
1989	Jay Bergman	Independent	42	22	0	.656	—	—	—	—	—	—	East Regional	
1990	Jay Bergman	Independent	40	20	0	.667	—	—	—	—	—	—	—	
1991	Jay Bergman	American South Conference	41	21	0	.661	10	8	0	.556			—	
1992	Jay Bergman	Sun Belt Conference	35	23	0	.603	9	11	0	.450			—	
1993	Jay Bergman	TransAmerica Athletic Conference	31	31	0	.500	9	9	0	.500		1st	East Regional	
1994	Jay Bergman	TransAmerica Athletic Conference	29	26	0	.527	8	10	0	.444			—	
1995	Jay Bergman	TransAmerica Athletic Conference	49	13	0	.790	23	7	0	.767		1st	Atlantic Regional	
1996	Jay Bergman	TransAmerica Athletic Conference	43	22	0	.662	9	9	0	.500		1st	East Regional	
1997	Jay Bergman	TransAmerica Athletic Conference	40	24	0	.625	7	10	0	.412		1st	East Regional	
1998	Jay Bergman	TransAmerica Athletic Conference	41	21	0	.661	12	6	0	.667			—	
1999	Jay Bergman	TransAmerica Athletic Conference	38	21	0	.644	19	11	0	.633			—	
2000	Jay Bergman	TransAmerica Athletic Conference	43	19	0	.694	22	5	0	.815	1st		Tallahassee Regional	
2001	Jay Bergman	TransAmerica Athletic Conference	51	14	0	.785	22	5	0	.815	1st	1st	Columbia Regional	
2002	Jay Bergman	Atlantic Sun Conference	41	22	0	.651	23	7	0	.767	1st	1st	Tallahassee Regional	
2003	Jay Bergman	Atlantic Sun Conference	31	25	0	.554	14	16	0	.467			—	
2004	Jay Bergman	Atlantic Sun Conference	47	18	0	.723	24	6	0	.800	1st		Tallahassee Regional	
2005	Jay Bergman	Atlantic Sun Conference	42	18	0	.700	19	11	0	.633			—	
2006	Jay Bergman	Conference USA	23	33	0	.411	5	19	0	.208			—	
2007	Jay Bergman	Conference USA	27	32	0	.458	7	17	0	.292			—	
2008	Bergman/Craig Cozart^{†}	Conference USA	31	27	0	.534	8	16	0	.333			—	
2009	Terry Rooney	Conference USA	22	35	0	.386	9	15	0	.375			—	
2010	Terry Rooney	Conference USA	33	22	0	.600	10	14	0	.417			—	
2011	Terry Rooney	Conference USA	39	23	0	.629	12	12	0	.500			Tallahassee Regional	
2012	Terry Rooney	Conference USA	45	17	0	.726	16	8	0	.667			Coral Gables Regional	
2013	Terry Rooney	Conference USA	29	30	0	.492	13	11	0	.542			—	
2014	Terry Rooney	American Athletic Conference	36	23	0	.610	17	7	0	.708			—	
2015	Terry Rooney	American Athletic Conference	31	27	0	.534	10	14	0	.417			—	
2016	Terry Rooney	American Athletic Conference	26	33	0	.441	8	16	0	.333			—	
2017	Greg Lovelady	American Athletic Conference	40	22	0	.645	15	9	0	.625	1st		Tallahassee Regional	
2018	Greg Lovelady	American Athletic Conference	35	21	0	.625	13	10	0	.565			—	
2019	Greg Lovelady	American Athletic Conference	36	22	0	.621	11	13	0	.458			—	
2020	Greg Lovelady	American Athletic Conference	15	3	0	.833	—	—	—	—			—	
2021	Greg Lovelady	American Athletic Conference	31	30	0	.508	18	14	0	.563			—	
2022	Greg Lovelady	American Athletic Conference	35	25	0	.583	14	10	0	.583			—	
2023	Greg Lovelady	American Athletic Conference	33	26	0	.559	12	12	0	.500			—	
2024	Rich Wallace	Big 12 Conference	37	31	0	.508	14	15	0	.563			Tallahassee Regional	
2025	Rich Wallace	Big 12 Conference	29	26	0	.527	9	21	0	.300				
Total			1756	1177	10	(Regular season games only)								
Total			27	33	0	(Tournament games only)								
Total			1783	1210	10	(All games)								
^{†} Denotes interim coach

=== Notes ===
Sources:
