= 2013 UCF Knights baseball team =

American college baseball season

2013 UCF Knights baseball
- Conference: Conference USA
- Record: 29–27 (13–11 C-USA)
- Head coach: Terry Rooney (5th year)
- Assistant coaches: Ryan Klosterman (2nd year); Kevin Schnall (1st year)
- Home stadium: Jay Bergman Field

2013 Conference USA baseball standings
	Conf.				Overall
Team	W		L	PCT	W		L	PCT
No. 14 Rice ‍†‍‡‍^{y}	15	–	9	.625	44	–	20	.688
Southern Miss ‍‍‍	15	–	9	.625	30	–	27	.526
East Carolina ‍‍‍	14	–	10	.583	31	–	26	.544
Memphis ‍‍‍	14	–	10	.583	35	–	24	.593
UCF ‍‍‍	13	–	11	.542	29	–	30	.492
Houston ‍‍‍	13	–	11	.542	36	–	22	.621
Tulane ‍‍‍	11	–	13	.458	30	–	28	.517
UAB ‍‍‍	7	–	17	.292	23	–	36	.390
Marshall ‍‍‍	6	–	18	.250	20	–	34	.370
† – Conference champion ‡ – Tournament champion y – Invited to the NCAA tournament As of June 8, 2013; Rankings from Collegiate Baseball

The 2013 UCF Knights baseball team represented the University of Central Florida in the 2013 college baseball season. The Knights competed in Division I of the National Collegiate Athletic Association (NCAA) and Conference USA (C-USA). The team played their home games at Jay Bergman Field (also known as the UCF Baseball Complex), located on UCF's main campus in Orlando, Florida. The Knights were led by head coach Terry Rooney, who was in his fifth season with the team.

In the 2013 season, the Knights looked to build upon their appearance in the 2012 tournament, in which they came within one game of advancing to the programs first super regional. UCF had advanced to the NCAA tournament in each of the two previous seasons. The 2013 season also marked UCF's last as a member of Conference USA, as the Knights became members of the American Athletic Conference (The American) in July 2013.

== Personnel ==
=== Coaching staff ===
2013 UCF Knights coaching staff
- 26 Terry Rooney – Head Coach - 5th season
- 7 Ryan Klosterman - Assistant Coach – 2nd season
- 22 Kevin Schnall - Assistant Coach – 1st season
- 2 Alex Guerra - Assistant Coach – 2nd season

=== Roster ===
2013 UCF Knights roster
Pitchers: 16 Brian Adkins - Senior; 19 Ben Lively - Junior; 23 Tyler Martin - Freshman; 25 Eric Skoglund - Sophomore; 28 Shawn McDorman - Senior; 31 Zach Favre - Freshman; 32 Daniel Davis - Redshirt sophomore; 33 Harrison Hukari - Sophomore; 34 Jimmy Reed - Senior; 35 Spencer Davis - Redshirt Sophomore; 37 Gregg Cooke - Redshirt Junior; 40 Alex Milne - Freshman; 41 Chris Matulis - Redshirt Senior; 44 Ryan Meyer - Redshirt Freshman	Infielders: 1 Travis Shreve - Senior; 3 Spencer Haynes - Sophomore; 5 Austin Johnston - Senior; 13 James Vasquez - Sophomore; 14 Tommy Williams - Sophomore; 21 Jarrod Petree - Freshman; Utility: 17 Parker Webster - Junior; 30 Nick Carrillo - Senior	Catchers: 9 Ryan Breen - Senior; 15 Dale Irving - Sophomore; 20 Chris Taladay - Senior; 29 Ethan Smith - Junior; Outfielders: 4 Ryan Reilly - Freshman; 6 JoMarcos Woods - Sophomore; 8 Lorenzo Butler - Freshman; 10 Erik Barber - Sophomore; 12 Erik Hempe - Redshirt Senior; 18 Bo Decker - Freshman; 24 Hunter Wildes - Freshman; 27 Jeramy Matos - Senior

== Schedule ==
2013 UCF Knights baseball game log
Regular season
February

Date	Opponent	Rank	Site/stadium	Score	Win	Loss	Save	Attendance	Overall record	Conf. Record
February 15	Siena	–	Jay Bergman Field	7–1	B. Lively (1–0)	J. Brantley (0–1)	None	2,017	1–0	–
February 16	Siena	–	Jay Bergman Field	4–7	M. Gage (1–0)	E. Skoglund (0–1)	None	1,381	1–1	–
February 17	Siena	–	Jay Bergman Field	8–2	D. Davis (1–0)	R. Morales (0–1)	None	1,204	2–1	–
February 19	#13 Florida	–	Jay Bergman Field	3–5	P. Danciu (2–0)	B. Adkins (0–1)	Magliozzi (2)	3,678	2–2	–
February 22	Connecticut	–	Jay Bergman Field	7–3	B. Lively (2–0)	A. Marzi (0–2)	S. Davis (1)	1,702	3–2	–
February 23	Texas Tech	–	Jay Bergman Field	13–8	D. Davis (2–0)	C. Taylor (1–1)	C. Matulis (1)	1,844	4–2	–
February 24	Troy	–	Jay Bergman Field	Postponed						
February 26	South Florida	–	Jay Bergman Field	4–6	Clarkson (1–0)	B. Adkins (0–2)	Leasure (1)	1,681	4–3	–
February 27	at Bethune-Cookman	–	Jackie Robinson Ballpark	0–6	M. Durapau (2–0)	E. Skoglund (0–2)	None	412	4–4	–

March

Date	Opponent	Rank	Site/stadium	Score	Win	Loss	Save	Attendance	Overall record	Conf. Record
March 1	Winthrop	–	Jay Bergman Field	3–0	B. Lively (3–0)	M. Pierpont (1–1)	S. Davis (2)	1,235	5–4	–
March 2	Winthrop	–	Jay Bergman Field	12–7	C. Matulis (1–0)	T. Klitsch (0–2)	None	1,256	6–4	–
March 3	Winthrop	–	Jay Bergman Field	7–6	S. Davis (1–0)	J. Driver (0–2)	None	1,157	7–4	–
March 5	North Florida	–	Jay Bergman Field	5–9	M. Renner (2–0)	E. Skoglund (0–3)	C. Olmstead (2)	1,508	7–5	–
March 6	at #24 Miami (FL)	–	Alex Rodriguez Park at Mark Light Field	0–5	B. Radziewski (1–0)	B. Adkins (0–3)	None	2,232	7–6	–
March 8	Jacksonville	–	Jay Bergman Field	0–4	C. Anderson (2–1)	B. Lively (3–1)	None	1,384	7–7	–
March 9	Jacksonville	–	Jay Bergman Field	5–2	D. Davis (3–0)	J. Baker (0–3)	None	1,188	8–7	–
March 10	at Jacksonville	–	John Sessions Stadium	6–4	Z. Farve (1–0)	D. Woods (0–2)	None	209	9–7	–
March 12	Florida A&M	–	Jay Bergman Field	6–4	S. Davis (2–0)	C. Priestly (0–1)	None	987	10–7	–
March 13	Florida A&M	–	Jay Bergman Field	5–2	Z. Favre (2–0)	B. Neal (0–1)	None	1,206	11–7	–
March 15	Columbia	–	Jay Bergman Field	10–3	B. Lively (4–1)	D. Speer (0–2)	None	1,553	12–7	–
March 16	Columbia	–	Jay Bergman Field	4–5	T. Crispi (1–0)	S. Davis (2–1)	A. Black (2)	1,230	12–8	–
March 17	Columbia	–	Jay Bergman Field	6–1	B. Adkins (1–3)	A. Cline (0–2)	None	1,385	13–8	–
March 18	Columbia	–	Jay Bergman Field	5–1	E. Skoglund (1–3)	T. Crispi (1–3)	None	1,145	14–8	–
March 20	at Jacksonville	–	John Sessions Stadium	5–7	W. Torrez (1–1)	D. Davis (3–1)	A. Maxon (2)	122	14–9	–
March 22	at UAB*	–	Jerry D. Young Memorial Field	8–0	B. Lively (5–1)	S. Kelley (1–1)	None	274	15–9	1–0
March 23	at UAB*	–	Jerry D. Young Memorial Field	6–1	C. Matulis (2–0)	T. Bryant (2–2)	None	304	16–9	2–0
March 24	at UAB*	–	Jerry D. Young Memorial Field	12–10	S. Davis (3–1)	C. Rose (0–1)	T. Martin (1)	314	17–9	3–0
March 28	Southern Miss*	–	Jay Bergman Field	1–4	J. Drehoff (1–3)	B. Lively (5–2)	J. Myrick (2)	1,673	17–10	3–1
March 29	Southern Miss*	–	Jay Bergman Field	4–3	C. Matulis (3–0)	C. Livingston (0–4)	S. Davis (3)	1,904	18–10	4–1
March 30	Southern Miss*	–	Jay Bergman Field	3–4	C. Fisk (2–1)	B. Adkins (1–4)	B. Rooney (3)	1,633	18–11	4–2

April

Date	Opponent	Rank	Site/stadium	Score	Win	Loss	Save	Attendance	Overall record	Conf. Record
April 2	Florida	–	McKethan Stadium	3-5	R. Harris (4-2)	C. Matulis (3-1)	J. Magliozzi (6)	3,225	18-12	4-2
April 5	at Memphis*	–	FedExPark	1-2	Moll (5-2)	B. Lively (5-3)	H. Hatfield(1)	412	18-13	4-3
April 6	at Memphis*	–	FedExPark	2-5	Schoenrock (4-2)	C. Matulis (3-2)	Van Eaton(5)	512	18-14	4-4
April 7	at Memphis*	–	FedExPark	7-8	H. Hatfield (2-1)	B. Adkins (1-5)	None	472	18-15	4-5
April 10	at USF	–	USF Baseball Stadium	3-9	Herget (4-1)	D. Davis (3-2)	None	1,202	18-16	4-5
April 12	at #18 Rice*	–	Reckling Park	5-1	C. Matulis (4-2)	A. Kubitza (4-2)	None	3,868	19-16	5-5
April 13	at #18 Rice*	–	Reckling Park	11-7	D. Davis (4-2)	McCanna (2-1)	None	3,387	20-16	6-5
April 14	at #18 Rice*	–	Reckling Park	6-7	Fox (4-0)	T. Martin (0-1)	None	2,988	20-17	6-6
April 16	Florida Atlantic	–	Jay Bergman Field	2-10	Miller (3-0)	B. Adkins (1-6)	None	1,447	20-18	6-6
April 19	Marshall*	–	Jay Bergman Field	4-5	Hopkins (2-2)	Z. Favre (2-1)	King(3)	1,880	20-19	6-7
April 20	Marshall*	–	Jay Bergman Field	3-1	B. Lively (6-3)	Blair (5-3)	S. Davis (4)	1,153	21-19	7-7
April 21	Marshall*	–	Jay Bergman Field	11-0	B. Adkins (2-6)	Taylor (3-4)	None	930	22-19	8-7
April 26	#30 Houston*	–	Jay Bergman Field	4-2	C. Matulis (5-2)	Poncedeleon (5-4)	Z. Favre(3)	1,423	23-19	9-7
April 27	#30 Houston*	–	Jay Bergman Field	5-4	S. Davis (4-1)	Pruitt (7-4)	None	1,272	24-19	10-7
April 28	#30 Houston*	–	Jay Bergman Field	7-1	B. Adkins (3-6)	Garza (4-4)	Z. Favre(4)	1,266	25-19	11-7

May

Date	Opponent	Rank	Site/stadium	Score	Win	Loss	Save	Attendance	Overall record	Conf. Record
May 1	Bethune-Cookman	30	Jay Bergman Field	8–1	T. Martin (1–1)	L. Martinez (0–2)	None	1,045	26–19	11–7
May 3	at #9 Florida State	30	Mike Martin Field	2–4	R. Coles (3–1)	S. Davis (4–2)	None	3,933	26–20	11–7
May 4	at #9 Florida State	30	Mike Martin Field	1–6	Leibrandt (7–4)	C. Matulis (5–3)	None	4,215	26–21	11–7
May 5	at #9 Florida State	30	Mike Martin Field	4–5	R. Coles (4–1)	Z. Favre (2–2)	None	4,268	26–22	11–7
May 8	Bethune-Cookman	–	Jay Bergman Field	4–0	Z. Favre (3–2)	S. Garner (5–5)	None	1,199	27–22	11–7
May 10	Tulane*	–	Jay Bergman Field	1–8	Byo (4–4)	B. Lively (6–4)	None	1,279	27–23	11–8
May 11	Tulane*	–	Jay Bergman Field	9–15	McKenzie (3–2)	C. Matulis (5–4)	None	1,163	27–24	11–9
May 12	Tulane*	–	Jay Bergman Field	7–3	B. Adkins (4–6)	R. LeBlanc (4–4)	None	1,032	28–24	12–9
May 14	at Florida Atlantic	–	FAU Baseball Stadium	3–4	Logan (5–1)	E. Skoglund (1–4)	Adams (14)	396	28–25	12–9
May 16	at East Carolina*	–	Clark–LeClair Stadium	2–0	B. Lively (7–4)	Hoffman (6–6)	None	2,313	29–25	13–9
May 17	at East Carolina*	–	Clark–LeClair Stadium	8–10	Mabry (4–3)	D. Davis (4–3)	Reynolds (13)	2,578	29–26	13–10
May 18	at East Carolina*	–	Clark–LeClair Stadium	5–6	J. Harris (3–3)	B. Adkins (4–7)	None	2,418	29–27	13–11

Postseason
C-USA Tournament

Date	Opponent	Rank	Site/stadium	Score	Win	Loss	Save	Attendance	Tournament record
May 22	Memphis	–	Cougar Field	1–6	Moll (9–3)	B. Lively (7–5)	None	–	0–1
May 23	Rice	–	Cougar Field	1–5	Stephens (7–4)	C. Matulis (5–5)	None	3,741	0–2
May 24	UAB	–	Cougar Field	1–5	A. Luna (2–4)	B. Adkins (4–8)	None	3,250	0–3

Rankings from USA TODAY/ESPN Top 25 coaches' baseball poll. Parenthesis indicate tournament seedings.
*Conference game

== Rankings ==
Ranking movements Legend: ██ Increase in ranking ██ Decrease in ranking — = Not ranked RV = Received votes
	Week																		
Poll	Pre	1	2	3	4	5	6	7	8	9	10	11	12	13	14	15	16	17	Final
Coaches'	RV	RV*	—	—	—	—													
Baseball America	—	—	—	—	—	—													
Collegiate Baseball^	RV	—	—	—	—	—													
NCBWA†	RV	—	—	—	—	—													

^ Collegiate Baseball ranked 40 teams in their preseason poll, but only ranked 30 teams weekly during the season.
† NCBWA ranks 30 teams in their preseason poll, but only ranks 25 teams weekly during the season.
* A new poll was not released for this week, so for comparison purposes, the previous week's ranking is inserted in this week's slot.

== See also ==
- UCF Knights
