= American Conference baseball awards =

At the end of each regular season, the American Athletic Conference names major award winners in baseball. Currently, it names a Coach, Pitcher, Player, and Freshman of the Year. The selections are determined by a vote of the conference's coaches at the end of each regular season. The awards were first given out in 2014, the conference's first season of competition.

== Coach of the Year ==
In 2014, UCF head coach Terry Rooney was chosen as the conference's best coach. In the regular season, UCF went 34-22 (17-7 American) to finish second in the conference.

=== Winners by season ===
Below is a table of the award's winners.

Season	Coach	School	Conf. (Rk.)	Overall
2014	Terry Rooney	UCF	17–7 (2nd)	36–23
2015	Cliff Godwin	East Carolina	15–9 (2nd)	36–20
2016	Jim Penders	Connecticut	14–9 (3rd)	38–25
2017	Greg Lovelady	UCF	15–9 (1st)	40–22
2018	Todd Whitting	Houston	16–8 (1st)	38–25
2019	Cliff Godwin	East Carolina	20–4 (1st)	47–18
2020	none	none -		
2021	Cliff Godwin	East Carolina	20–8 (1st)	44–17
2022	Cliff Godwin	East Carolina	20–4 (1st)	46–21
2023	Loren Hibbs	Wichita State	13–10 (2nd)	30–25
2024	Cliff Godwin	East Carolina	19–8 (1st)	46–17
2025	Patrick Hallmark	UTSA	23–4 (1st)	47–15
2026	Casey Dunn	UAB	15–12 (4th)	31–24

=== Winners by school ===
The following is a table of the schools whose coaches have won the award, along with the year each school joined the conference, the number of times it has won the award, and the years in which it has done so.

School (year joined)	Awards	Seasons
East Carolina (2015)	5	2015, 2019, 2021, 2022, 2024
UCF (2014)	2	2014, 2017
Connecticut (2014)	1	2016
Houston (2013)	1	2018
Wichita State (2014)	1	2023
UAB (2023)	1	2026
UTSA (2024)	1	2025

== Pitcher of the Year ==
In 2014, UCF's Eric Skoglund was chosen as the conference's best pitcher. In the regular season, the junior went 9-2 with a 2.04 ERA and 92 strikeouts. After the season, he was selected in the third round of the 2014 MLB draft by the Kansas City Royals.

=== Winners by season ===
Below is a table of the award's winners.

Season	Pitcher	School
2014	Eric Skoglund	UCF
2015	Carson Cross	Connecticut
2016	Anthony Kay	Connecticut
2017	Trey Cumbie	Houston
2017	Robby Howell	UCF
2018	Aaron Fletcher	Houston
2019	Jake Agnos	East Carolina
2020	none -	
2021	Gavin Williams	East Carolina
2022	Carter Spivey	East Carolina
2023	Dalton Fowler	Memphis
2024	Trey Yesavage	East Carolina
2025	Blake Gillespie	Charlotte
2026	Conor Myles	UTSA

=== Winners by school ===
The following is a table of the schools whose players have won the award, along with the number of times it has won the award, and the years in which it has done so.

School (year joined)	Awards	Seasons
East Carolina (2015)	4	2019, 2021, 2022, 2024
Connecticut (2014)	2	2015, 2016
Houston (2013)	2	2017, 2018
UCF (2014)	2	2014, 2017
Charlotte (2023)	1	2025
Memphis (2014)	1	2023
UTSA (2024)	1	2026

== Player of the Year ==
In 2014, Jeff Gardner was chosen as the conference's best player. Gardner had been selected as the Preseason Player of the Year, and in the regular season, he led the conference in slugging percentage, runs batted in, and total bases. After the season, he was selected by the Washington Nationals in the 8th round of the 2014 MLB draft.

=== Winners by season ===
Below is a table of the award's winners.

Season	Pitcher	School
2014	Jeff Gardner	Louisville
2015	Ian Happ	Cincinnati
2016	Joe DeRouche-Duffin	Connecticut
2017	Jake Scheiner	Houston
2017	Hunter Williams	Tulane
2018	Bryant Packard	East Carolina
2019	Kody Hoese	Tulane
2020	none -	
2021	Connor Norby	East Carolina
2022	Griffin Merritt	Cincinnati
2023	Brock Rodden	Wichita State
2024	Carter Cunningham	East Carolina
2025	Mason Lytle	UTSA
2026	Drew Detlefsen	UTSA

=== Winners by school ===
The following is a table of the schools whose players have won the award, along with the number of times it has won the award, and the years in which it has done so.

School (year joined)	Awards	Seasons
East Carolina (2015)	3	2018, 2021, 2024
Cincinnati (2014)	2	2015, 2022
Tulane (2014)	2	2017, 2019
UTSA (2024)	2	2025, 2026
Connecticut (2014)	1	2016
Houston (2013)	1	2017
Louisville (2014) (Note: After the 2014 season, Louisville left to join the Atlantic Coast Conference.)	1	2014
Wichita State (2017)	1	2023

== Newcomer Pitcher of the Year ==
In 2014, the Newcomer Pitcher of the Year award was shared by Houston pitcher Andrew Lantrip and Rutgers pitcher Gaby Rosa. Lantrip, as a midweek starter, went 5-0 with a 1.64 ERA in the regular season; Rosa went 6-2 with a 2.28 ERA. In the summer of 2014, Lantrip played for the California Collegiate League's Santa Barbara Foresters, and Rosa played for the Staten Island Tide of the Atlantic Collegiate Baseball League.

=== Winners by season ===
Below is a table of the award's winners.

Season	Pitcher	School
2014	Andrew Lantrip	Houston
2014	Gaby Rosa	Rutgers
2015	Seth Romero	Houston
2016	Tim Cate	Connecticut
2017	Mason Feole	Connecticut
2018	Alec Burleson	East Carolina
2019	Devon Roedahl	Houston
2020	none -	
2021	Jake Kaminska	Wichita State
2022	Landon Gartman	Memphis
2023	Grant Adler	Wichita State
2024	Tommy LaPour	Wichita State
2025	Blake Gillespie	Charlotte
2026	Tanner Wiggins	Rice

=== Winners by school ===
The following is a table of the schools whose players have won the award, along with the year each school joined the conference, the number of times it has won the award, and the years in which it has done so.

School (year joined)	Awards	Seasons
Houston (2014)	3	2014, 2015, 2019
Wichita State (2017)	3	2021, 2023, 2024
Connecticut (2014)	2	2016, 2017
East Carolina (2015)	1	2018
Memphis (2014)	1	2022
Charlotte (2023)	1	2025
Rice (2024)	1	2026
Rutgers (2014) (Note: After the 2014 season, Rutgers left to join the Big Ten Conference.)	1	2014

== Newcomer Position Player of the Year ==
=== Winners by season ===
Below is a table of the Newcomer Position Player of the Year award's winners.

Season	Player	School
2016	Joe Davis	Houston
2017	Rylan Thomas	UCF
2018	Christian Fedko	Connecticut
2019	Hunter Goodman	Memphis
2020	none -	
2021	Bennett Lee	Tulane
2022	Brock Rodden	Wichita State
2023	Justin Murray	Houston
2024	Mason Lytle	UTSA
2025	Todd Clay	UAB
2025	Drew Detlefsen	UTSA
2026	Jayson Jones	Wichita State

=== Winners by school ===
The following is a table of the schools whose coaches have won the award, along with the year each school joined the conference, the number of times it has won the award, and the years in which it has done so.

School (year joined)	Awards	Seasons
Houston (2014)	2	2016, 2024
UTSA (2024)	2	2024, 2025
Wichita State (2017)	2	2022, 2026
Connecticut (2014)	1	2018
Memphis (2014)	1	2019
Tulane (2014)	1	2021
UCF (2014)	1	2017
UAB (2023)	1	2025

== Defensive Player of the Year ==
=== Winners by season ===
Below is a table of the Defensive Player of the Year award's winners.

Season	Player	School
2023	Eric Snow	South Florida
2024	Ryley Johnson	East Carolina
2025	Mason Lytle	UTSA
2026	Jevin Relaford	South Florida

=== Winners by school ===
The following is a table of the schools whose coaches have won the award, along with the year each school joined the conference, the number of times it has won the award, and the years in which it has done so.

School (year joined)	Awards	Seasons
South Florida (2014)	2	2023, 2026
East Carolina (2015)	1	2024
UTSA (2024)	1	2025
