= 2012 Conference USA baseball tournament =

- 2012 CUSA baseball tournament logo
- Teams: 8
- Format: 2 division round robin and championship game
- Finals site: Trustmark Park; Pearl, MS
- Champions: UAB (1st title)
- Winning coach: Brian Shoop (1st title)
- MVP: Michael Busby (UAB)

2012 Conference USA baseball standings
	Conf.						Overall
Team	W		L		T	PCT	W		L		T	PCT
No. 9 Rice ‍†‍‍^{y}	17	–	7	–	0	.708	40	–	17	–	0	.702
No. 18 UCF ‍‍‍^{y}	16	–	8	–	0	.667	43	–	15	–	0	.741
Tulane ‍‍‍	14	–	10	–	0	.583	38	–	20	–	0	.655
Southern Miss ‍‍‍	14	–	10	–	0	.583	32	–	24	–	0	.571
Memphis ‍‍‍	14	–	10	–	0	.583	31	–	28	–	0	.525
East Carolina ‍‍‍^{y}	13	–	10	–	1	.563	35	–	22	–	1	.612
UAB ‍‍‡‍^{y}	9	–	15	–	0	.375	32	–	28	–	0	.533
Houston ‍‍‍	5	–	18	–	1	.229	18	–	35	–	1	.343
Marshall ‍‍‍	5	–	19	–	0	.208	17	–	37	–	0	.315
† – Conference champion ‡ – Tournament champion y – Invited to the 2012 NCAA Division I baseball tournament As of May 30 2012; Rankings from Coaches' Poll

The 2012 Conference USA baseball tournament was held at Trustmark Park in Pearl, MS from May 23 to May 27, 2012. The tournament used the format from the previous season, with the top eight teams from the regular season divided into two four-team pods. After round robin play, the teams with the best record in each pod met in a championship game. UAB won their first championship and claimed the Conference USA's automatic bid to the 2012 NCAA Division I baseball tournament.

== Seeding ==
The top eight teams (based on conference results) from the conference earned invites to the tournament.

Team	W	L	T	PCT	GB	Seed
Rice	17	7	0	.708	–	1
UCF	16	8	0	.667	1	2
Tulane	14	10	0	.583	3	3
Southern Miss	14	10	0	.583	3	4
Memphis	14	10	0	.583	3	5
East Carolina	13	10	1	.563	3.5	6
UAB	9	15	0	.375	8	7
Houston	5	18	1	.229	11.5	8
Marshall	5	19	0	.208	12	–

== Results ==
	Division A	Rice	Southern Miss	Memphis	Houston	Overall
1	Rice		L 2–4	L 2–3	W 7–5	1–2
4	Southern Miss	W 4–2		L 3–14	W 8–7	2–1
5	Memphis	W 3–2	W 14–3		L 3–7	2–1
8	Houston	L 5–7	L 7–8	W 7–3		1–2

	Division B	UCF	Tulane	East Carolina	UAB	Overall
2	UCF		W 6–2	W 11–1	L 1–15	2–1
3	Tulane	L 2–6		W 4–3	L 3–6	1–2
6	East Carolina	L 1–11	L 3–4		W 10–3	1–2
7	UAB	W 15–1	W 6–3	L 3–10		2–1

Finals
A	Memphis	0
B	UAB	5

== All-Tournament Team ==
The following players were named to the All-Tournament Team.

Pos.	Name	School
C	Keaton Aldridge	Memphis
IF	Keith DePew	UAB
IF	John Frost	UAB
IF	Ashley Graeter	Southern Miss
IF	Corey Thompson	East Carolina
OF	Landon Appling	Houston
OF	Jeff Schalk	UAB
OF	Michael Sterling	Southern Miss
DH	Eli Hynes	Memphis
P	Michael Busby	UAB
P	Dan Langfield	Memphis
P	Chase Mallard	UAB
P	Ryan Nance	UAB

=== Most Valuable Player ===
Michael Busby was named Tournament Most Valuable Player. Busby was a pitcher for UAB.
