= 2012 UCF Knights baseball team =

American college baseball season

2012 UCF Knights baseball

Coral Gables Regional, 2–2
- Conference: Conference USA

Ranking
- Coaches: No. 24
- Record: 45–17 (16–8 C-USA)
- Head coach: Terry Rooney (4th year)
- Assistant coaches: Ryan Klosterman (1st year); Joe Mercadante (1st year)
- Home stadium: Jay Bergman Field

2012 Conference USA baseball standings
	Conf.						Overall
Team	W		L		T	PCT	W		L		T	PCT
No. 9 Rice ‍†‍‍^{y}	17	–	7	–	0	.708	40	–	17	–	0	.702
No. 18 UCF ‍‍‍^{y}	16	–	8	–	0	.667	43	–	15	–	0	.741
Tulane ‍‍‍	14	–	10	–	0	.583	38	–	20	–	0	.655
Southern Miss ‍‍‍	14	–	10	–	0	.583	32	–	24	–	0	.571
Memphis ‍‍‍	14	–	10	–	0	.583	31	–	28	–	0	.525
East Carolina ‍‍‍^{y}	13	–	10	–	1	.563	35	–	22	–	1	.612
UAB ‍‍‡‍^{y}	9	–	15	–	0	.375	32	–	28	–	0	.533
Houston ‍‍‍	5	–	18	–	1	.229	18	–	35	–	1	.343
Marshall ‍‍‍	5	–	19	–	0	.208	17	–	37	–	0	.315
† – Conference champion ‡ – Tournament champion y – Invited to the 2012 NCAA Division I baseball tournament As of May 30 2012; Rankings from Coaches' Poll

The 2012 UCF Knights baseball team represented the University of Central Florida in the 2012 NCAA Division I baseball season. The Knights played their home games at Jay Bergman Field in Orlando, Florida. The Knights were led by head coach Terry Rooney, who was in his fourth season with the team.

The 2012 season marked the second consecutive season that the Knights made the NCAA tournament. Their 2011 tournament appearance was the program's first since 2004.

== Personnel ==
=== Coaching staff ===
2012 UCF Knights coaching staff
- 26 Terry Rooney – Head Coach - 4th season
- 7 Ryan Klosterman - Assistant Coach – 1st season
- 17 Joe Mercadante - Assistant Coach – 1st season
- 8 Brandon Romans - Assistant Coach – 3rd season

=== Roster ===
2012 UCF Knights roster
Pitchers: 11 Garrett Nuss - Freshman; 16 Brian Adkins - Junior; 19 Ben Lively - Sophomore; 24 Joe Rogers - Junior; 25 Eric Skoglund - Freshman; 28 Shawn McDorman - Junior; 32 Bryan Brown - Senior; 33 Harrison Hukari - Freshman; 34 Jimmy Reed - Junior; 35 Roman Madrid - Junior; 36 Ray Hanson - Senior; 37 Gregg Cooke - Sophomore; 39 Patrick Sullivan - Junior; 41 Chris Matulis - Junior; 43 Matt Collins - Senior	Infielders: 1 Travis Shreve - Senior; 3 Spencer Haynes - Freshman; 5 Austin Johnston - Junior; 13 James Vasquez - Freshman; 14 Tommy Williams - Freshman; 21 Darnell Sweeney - Junior; 42 D.J. Hicks - Junior	Catchers: 9 Ryan Breen - Junior; 15 Dale Irving - Freshman; 20 Chris Taladay - Junior; 29 Ethan Smith - Sophomore; Outfielders: 2 Ronnie Richardson - Junior; 6 JoMarcos Woods - Freshman; 10 Erik Barber - Freshman; 12 Erik Hempe - Senior; 27 Jeramy Matos - Junior; 30 Nick Carrillo - Junior; 39 Alex Friedrich - Senior

== Schedule ==
2012 UCF Knights baseball game log
Regular season
February

Date	Opponent	Rank	Site/stadium	Score	Overall record	Conf. Record
February 17	Long Island	–	Jay Bergman Field	13–7	1–0	–
February 18	Long Island	–	Jay Bergman Field	9–1	2–0	–
February 18	Long Island	–	Jay Bergman Field	9–1	3–0	–
February 22	at #1 Florida	–	McKethan Stadium	0–8	3–1	–
February 24	Boston College	–	Jay Bergman Field	6–5	4–1	–
February 25	Boston College	–	Jay Bergman Field	7–8	4–2	–
February 26	Boston College	–	Jay Bergman Field	5–4	5–2	–
February 28	South Florida	–	Jay Bergman Field	12–1	6–2	–
February 29	at Bethune-Cookman	–	Jackie Robinson Ballpark	8–4	7–2	–

March

Date	Opponent	Rank	Site/stadium	Score	Overall record	Conf. Record
March 2	Siena	–	Jay Bergman Field	12–4	8–2	–
March 3	Siena	–	Jay Bergman Field	16–4	9–2	–
March 4	Siena	–	Jay Bergman Field	15–2	10–2	–
March 6	#8 Florida State	#24	Jay Bergman Field	6–7	10–3	–
March 7	#8 Florida State	#24	Jay Bergman Field	0–1	10–4	–
March 9	UMass	#24	Jay Bergman Field	16–4	11–4	–
March 10	UMass	#24	Jay Bergman Field	5–4	12–4	–
March 11	UMass	#24	Jay Bergman Field	2–1	13–4	–
March 14	#10 Miami (FL)	#23	Jay Bergman Field	2–3	13–5	–
March 16	Harvard	#23	Jay Bergman Field	4–3	14–5	–
March 17	Harvard	#23	Jay Bergman Field	4–2	15–5	–
March 18	Harvard	#23	Jay Bergman Field	6–5	16–5	–
March 20	at South Florida	#21	USF Baseball Stadium	6–2	17–5	–
March 23	East Carolina	#21	Jay Bergman Field	2–1	18–5	1–0
March 24	East Carolina	#21	Jay Bergman Field	10–6	19–5	2–0
March 25	East Carolina	#21	Jay Bergman Field	6–15	19–6	2–1
March 27	at Florida Atlantic	#17	FAU Baseball Stadium	11–3	20–6	–
March 30	at Houston	#17	Cougar Field	8–3	21–6	3–1
March 31	at Houston	#17	Cougar Field	9–1	22–6	4–1

April

Date	Opponent	Rank	Site/stadium	Score	Overall record	Conf. Record
April 1	at Houston	#17	Cougar Field	3–1^{10}	23–6	5–1
April 4	at #13 Miami (FL)	#14	Alex Rodriguez Park at Mark Light Field	4–1	24–6	–
April 6	UAB	#14	Jay Bergman Field	4–11	24–7	5–2
April 7	UAB	#14	Jay Bergman Field	7–3	25–7	6–2
April 8	UAB	#14	Jay Bergman Field	8–7	26–7	7–2
April 10	Florida A&M	#15	Jay Bergman Field	16–4	27–7	–
April 11	Bethune-Cookman	#15	Jay Bergman Field	6–2	28–7	–
April 13	at Southern Miss	#15	Pete Taylor Park	0–1^{14}	28–8	7–3
April 14	at Southern Miss	#15	Pete Taylor Park	11–6	29–8	8–3
April 15	at Southern Miss	#15	Pete Taylor Park	12–3	30–8	9–3
April 17	Florida Atlantic	#14	Jay Bergman Field	12–3	31–8	–
April 20	at Tulane	#14	Greer Field at Turchin Stadium	1–0	32–8	10–3
April 21	at Tulane	#14	Greer Field at Turchin Stadium	8–7^{12}	33–8	11–3
April 22	at Tulane	#14	Greer Field at Turchin Stadium	8–6	34–8	12–3
April 27	at Memphis	#7	FedExPark	4–3	35–8	13–3
April 28	at Memphis	#7	FedExPark	5–6	35–9	13–4
April 29	at Memphis	#7	FedExPark	0–1	35–10	13–5

May

Date	Opponent	Rank	Site/stadium	Score	Overall record	Conf. Record
May 2	at Stetson	#15	Melching Field	5–4^{13}	36–10	–
May 5	Presbyterian	#15	Jay Bergman Field	8–1	37–10	–
May 6	Presbyterian	#15	Jay Bergman Field	2–7	37–11	–
May 7	Presbyterian	#15	Jay Bergman Field	7–2	38–11	–
May 11	at Marshall	#16	Appalachian Power Park	8–6	39–11	14–5
May 12	at Marshall	#16	Appalachian Power Park	6–9	39–12	14–6
May 13	at Marshall	#16	Appalachian Power Park	13–6	40–12	15–6
May 15	Stetson	#16	Jay Bergman Field	Cancelled (rain); no make-up.		
May 18	#7 Rice	#16	Jay Bergman Field	8–6	41–12	16–6
May 18	#7 Rice	#16	Jay Bergman Field	2–9	41–13	16–7
May 19	#7 Rice	#16	Jay Bergman Field	2–5	41–14	16–8

Postseason
C-USA Tournament

Date	Opponent	Rank	Site/stadium	Score	Overall record	C-USAT record
May 24	vs. (7) UAB	#17 (2)	Trustmark Park	1–15^{7}	41–15	0–1
May 25	vs. (6) East Carolina	#17 (2)	Trustmark Park	11–1^{8}	42–15	1–1
May 26	vs. (3) Tulane	#17 (2)	Trustmark Park	6–2	43–15	2–1

NCAA tournament: Coral Gables Regional

Date	Opponent	Rank	Site/stadium	Score	Overall record	NCAAT record
June 1	vs. (3) Missouri State	#18 (2)	Alex Rodriguez Park at Mark Light Field	2–1	44–15	1–0
June 2	vs. (4) Stony Brook	#18 (2)	Alex Rodriguez Park	9–8	45–15	2–0
June 3	vs. (4) Stony Brook	#18 (2)	Alex Rodriguez Park	5–12	45–16	2–1
June 4	vs. (4) Stony Brook	#18 (2)	Alex Rodriguez Park	6–10	45–17	2–2

Rankings from USA TODAY/ESPN Top 25 coaches' baseball poll. All times Eastern. Parenthesis indicate tournament seedings.

== Rankings ==
Ranking movements Legend: ██ Increase in ranking ██ Decrease in ranking — = Not ranked RV = Received votes
	Week																		
Poll	Pre	1	2	3	4	5	6	7	8	9	10	11	12	13	14	15	16	17	Final
Coaches'	RV	RV*	RV	24	23	21	17	14	15	14	7	15	16	16	17	18	—	—	24
Baseball America	21	19	19	18	19	21	17	15	15	15	14	15	16	16	19	20	—	—	—
Collegiate Baseball^	36	—	—	30	29	28	21	17	15	12	11	15	17	19	19	21	26	26	26
NCBWA†	28	24	26	21	22	19	16	14	13	10	8	13	13	13	16	15	19	21	21

^ Collegiate Baseball ranked 40 teams in their preseason poll, but only ranked 30 teams weekly during the season.
† NCBWA ranks 30 teams in their preseason poll, but only ranks 25 teams weekly during the season.
* A new poll was not released for this week, so for comparison purposes, the previous week's ranking is inserted in this week's slot.

== See also ==
- UCF Knights
- List of University of Central Florida alumni
