= Perry Roth =

American baseball coach

Current position
- Title: Bench coach
- Team: Bowling Green Hot Rods
- Conference: South Atlantic League

Biographical details
- Born: 53–54

Playing career
- 1990–1991: Greenville

Coaching career (HC unless noted)
- 1996–1997: Greenville (asst)
- 1998–1999: Calvary Academy (IL) HS
- 2000–2002: Illinois State (H/OF)
- 2003: Birmingham–Southern (H)
- 2004: Bradley (H)
- 2005–2006: Birmingham–Southern (H)
- 2007–2020: UAB (AHC/H)
- 2021: UAB (Interim HC)
- 2022–present: Charleston RiverDogs (H)

Head coaching record
- Overall: 18–36
- Tournaments: 0–0 (C-USA)

Perry Roth is an American baseball coach and former player, who is the current bench coach for the Bowling Green Hot Rods, the High-A affiliate of the Tampa Bay Rays. He played college baseball at Greenville University. He served as the interim head coach of the UAB Blazers (2021).

== Coaching career ==
Roth began his coaching career as an assistant coach with his alma mater, Greenville. He then became the head coach of the Calvary Academy in Springfield, Illinois. In the fall of 1999, Roth joined the staff of Jeff Stewart at Illinois State from 2000 to 2002 where he worked with the Redbird hitters and outfielders. In the fall of 2002, he joined the staff of Brian Shoop at Birmingham–Southern, where he worked the Panther hitters, but he then left after a single year to join Dewey Kalmer's staff at Bradley. He returned to Birmingham–Southern in the summer of 2004. When Shoop was hired as the head baseball coach for the UAB Blazers, he brought Roth with him to continue instructing hitters and outfielders. On May 13, 2020, Roth was named the interim head baseball coach of the Blazers for the 2021 season, following the retirement of Shoop.

After taking the Director of Player Development role with the LSU Tigers, Roth was quickly hired away by the Tampa Bay Rays organization, where they named him the hitting coach of the Charleston RiverDogs.

In 2026, Roth was named as the bench coach of the Bowling Green Hot Rods the High-A affiliate of the Tampa Bay Rays.

== Head coaching record ==
Record table
Season	Team	Overall	Conference	Standing	Postseason
UAB Blazers (Conference USA) (2021)
2021	UAB	18–36	11–21	6th (West)	
UAB:		18–36	11–21		
Total:		18–36			
