= 2013 Conference USA baseball tournament =

- Teams: 8
- Format: 2 division round-robin and championship game
- Finals site: Reckling Park; Houston, TX
- Champions: Rice (5th title)
- Winning coach: Wayne Graham (5th title)
- MVP: Christian Stringer (Rice)

2013 Conference USA baseball standings
	Conf.				Overall
Team	W		L	PCT	W		L	PCT
No. 14 Rice ‍†‍‡‍^{y}	15	–	9	.625	44	–	20	.688
Southern Miss ‍‍‍	15	–	9	.625	30	–	27	.526
East Carolina ‍‍‍	14	–	10	.583	31	–	26	.544
Memphis ‍‍‍	14	–	10	.583	35	–	24	.593
UCF ‍‍‍	13	–	11	.542	29	–	30	.492
Houston ‍‍‍	13	–	11	.542	36	–	22	.621
Tulane ‍‍‍	11	–	13	.458	30	–	28	.517
UAB ‍‍‍	7	–	17	.292	23	–	36	.390
Marshall ‍‍‍	6	–	18	.250	20	–	34	.370
† – Conference champion ‡ – Tournament champion y – Invited to the NCAA tournament As of June 8, 2013; Rankings from Collegiate Baseball

The 2013 Conference USA baseball tournament was held from May 22 through 26 at Reckling Park in Houston, Texas. The annual tournament determines the conference champion of the Division I Conference USA for college baseball. Rice won their fifth tournament championship and claimed the league's automatic bid to the 2013 NCAA Division I baseball tournament. This is the last of 19 athletic championship events held by the conference in the 2012–13 academic year.

The tournament was established in 1996, Conference USA's first season of play. Entering the event, Tulane has won the most championships, with five. Among current teams, only Marshall and Memphis have never won a title.

This was to be the third year of a three-year contract placing the event at Trustmark Park, home of an Atlanta Braves Class-AA affiliate in Pearl, Mississippi, a suburb of Jackson, Mississippi. However, the venue opted out of the contract, leaving Conference USA seeking a new home for the 2013 tournament. The conference announced that the tournament would instead be held at Reckling Park.

== Seeding and format ==
The tournament continued the round-robin tournament format introduced in 2010. The top eight finishers from the regular season were seeded one through eight and divided into two pools. The winners of each pool then met in a single championship game.

Team	W	L	Pct.	GB	Seed
Rice	15	9	.625	–	1
Southern Miss	15	9	.625	–	2
East Carolina	14	10	.583	1	3
Memphis	14	10	.583	1	4
UCF	13	11	.565	2	5
Houston	13	11	.565	2	6
Tulane	11	13	.435	4	7
UAB	7	17	.292	8	8
Marshall	6	18	.250	9	–

== Bracket ==
	Division A	RICE	MEM	UCF	UAB	Overall
1	Rice		W 10–1	W 5–1	W 3–1	3-0
4	Memphis	L 1–10		W 6–1	W 6–5	2-1
5	UCF	L 1–5	L 1–6		L 1–5	0-3
8	UAB	L 1-3	L 5–6	W 5–1		1-2

	Division B	USM	ECU	HOU	TUL	Overall
2	Southern Miss		L 7–8	W 4–2	W 10–7	2-1
3	East Carolina	W 8–7		L 4–9	L 5–6	1-2
6	Houston	L 2–4	W 9–4		L 2–3	1-2
7	Tulane	L 7–10	W 6–5	W 3–2		2-1

Finals
A	Rice	5*
B	Southern Miss	4

== All-Tournament Team ==
The following players were named to the All-Tournament Team.

Pos	Name	School
C	Keaton Aldridge	Memphis
IF	Shane Hoelscher	Rice
IF	Zach Houchins	East Carolina
IF	Justin Montemayor	Houston
IF	Christian Stringer	Rice
OF	Blake Brown	Southern Miss
OF	Leon Byrd	Rice
OF	Dillon Day	Southern Miss
DH	Drew Reynolds	East Carolina
P	Jake Drehoff	Southern Miss
P	Austin Kubitza	Rice
P	John Simms	Rice
P	Jordan Stephens	Rice

=== Most Valuable Player ===
Christian Stringer was named Tournament MVP. Stringer was an infielder for Rice who was 7–14 in the tournament for a .500 average with one RBI, one Stolen Base, and five runs scored.
