= 2018 UCF Knights baseball team =

American college baseball season

2018 UCF Knights baseball
- Conference: American Athletic Conference
- Record: 35–21 (13–10 The American)
- Head coach: Greg Lovelady (2nd season)
- Assistant coaches: Ryan Klosterman (7th season); Justin Parker (2nd season); Ted Tom (1st season)
- Home stadium: John Euliano Park

2018 American Athletic Conference baseball standings
	Conf.						Overall
Team	W		L		T	PCT	W		L		T	PCT
Houston ‍‍‍^{y}	16	–	8	–	0	.667	33	–	21	–	0	.611
South Florida ‍‍‍^{y}	14	–	9	–	1	.604	32	–	18	–	1	.637
Connecticut ‍‍‍^{y}	14	–	10	–	0	.583	37	–	22	–	1	.625
East Carolina ‍‍‡‍^{y}	14	–	10	–	0	.583	39	–	15	–	0	.722
UCF ‍‍‍	13	–	10	–	0	.565	35	–	19	–	0	.648
Cincinnati ‍‍‍	12	–	12	–	0	.500	28	–	26	–	0	.519
Wichita State ‍‍‍	9	–	14	–	1	.396	34	–	19	–	1	.639
Tulane ‍‍‍	9	–	14	–	0	.391	24	–	31	–	0	.436
Memphis ‍‍‍	5	–	19	–	0	.208	20	–	36	–	0	.357
‡ – Tournament champion y – Invited to the NCAA tournament As of May 20, 2018; Rankings from Collegiate Baseball

The 2018 UCF Knights baseball team represented the University of Central Florida during the 2018 NCAA Division I baseball season. The Knights played their home games at John Euliano Park as a member of the American Athletic Conference. They were led by head coach Greg Lovelady, in his second season at UCF.

== Schedule ==
All rankings from Collegiate Baseball.
