= 2023 American Athletic Conference baseball season =

- League: American Athletic Conference
- Sport: Baseball
- Teams: 8

Regular Season
- Season champions: East Carolina
- Season MVP: Brock Rodden, Wichita State

Tournament
- Champions: Tulane
- Runners-up: East Carolina

American Athletic Conference baseball seasons
- ← 2022 2024 →

The 2023 American Athletic Conference baseball season was the baseball season for the American Athletic Conference as part of the 2023 NCAA Division I baseball season. The conference tournament took place May 23–28 at BayCare Ballpark in Clearwater, Florida.

== Regular season ==
The American Athletic Conference began their conference play on March 31. Each team played 24 conference games.

=== Standings ===
| Pos | Team | Pld | CW | CL | CPCT | GB | W | L | PCT | Qualification |
|---|---|---|---|---|---|---|---|---|---|---|
| 1 | East Carolina (C) | 56 | 18 | 6 | .750 | — | 41 | 15 | .732 | Qualification for the first round & NCAA tournament |
| 2 | Houston | 54 | 17 | 6 | .739 | 0.5 | 33 | 21 | .611 | Qualification for the first round |
| 3 | Wichita State | 53 | 13 | 10 | .565 | 4.5 | 30 | 23 | .566 | Qualification for the first round |
| 4 | UCF | 56 | 12 | 12 | .500 | 6 | 32 | 24 | .571 | Qualification for the first round |
| 5 | Cincinnati | 55 | 10 | 14 | .417 (Note: Cincinnati won the regular season series 2 games to 1.) | 8 | 24 | 31 | .436 | Qualification for the first round |
| 6 | Memphis | 54 | 10 | 14 | .417 | 8 | 28 | 26 | .519 | Qualification for the first round |
| 7 | Tulane (T) | 54 | 8 | 16 | .333 | 10 | 15 | 39 | .278 | Qualification for the first round & NCAA tournament |
| 8 | South Florida | 56 | 7 | 17 | .292 | 11 | 19 | 37 | .339 | Qualification for the first round |

Updated to match(es) played on May 20, 2022. Source: AAC
(C) Champion; (T) Tournament champion

=== Results ===
| Home \ Away | UCF | CINN | ECU | HOU | MEM | USF | TUL | WSU |
|---|---|---|---|---|---|---|---|---|
| UCF | | | | 1–2 | 2–1 | 1–2 | | 2–1 |
| Cincinnati | 1–2 | | 0–3 | | | | 2–1 | 1–2 |
| East Carolina | 3–0 | 3–0 | | | 3–0 | | 2–1 | |
| Houston | | 2–1 | 2–1 | | | 2–1 | | 2–0 |
| Memphis | | 1–2 | | 1–2 | | 3–0 | 2–1 | |
| South Florida | 1–2 | 0–3 | 0–3 | | | | 2–1 | |
| Tulane | 1–2 | | | 0–3 | 2–1 | | | 1–2 |
| Wichita State | | | 3–0 | 1–2 | 2–1 | 2–1 | | |

Updated to match(es) played on May 20, 2023. Source: AAC
Legend: Blue = home team win; Red = away team win.

== Tournament ==
2023 American Athletic Conference baseball tournament
- Teams: 8
- Format: Double-elimination tournament
- Finals site: BayCare Ballpark; Clearwater, FL
- Champions: Tulane (1st title)
- Winning coach: Jay Uhlman (1st title)
- MVP: Teo Banks (Tulane)

The 2023 American Athletic Conference baseball tournament took place May 23 through May 28 at BayCare Ballpark in Clearwater, Florida. Tulane, the winner of the conference tournament, received the automatic bid to the 2023 NCAA Division I baseball tournament. Tulane won their first AAC tournament championship with a record of 19-40.

The top eight baseball teams in The American were seeded based on their records in conference play. The tournament used a two-bracket double-elimination format, leading to a single championship game between the winners of each bracket.

=== Bracket ===
First round
1 | East Carolina | 11
8 | South Florida | 12^{11}
4 | UCF | 4
5 | Cincinnati | 3
1 | East Carolina | 9
5 | Cincinnati | 6
2 | Houston | 8
7 | Tulane | 10
3 | Wichita State | 6
6 | Memphis | 10
2 | Houston | 4
3 | Wichita State | 3

Second round
8 | South Florida | 15^{8}
4 | UCF | 4
1 | East Carolina | 7^{13}
4 | UCF | 6
7 | Tulane | 12^{8}
6 | Memphis | 2
2 | Houston | 6
6 | Memphis | 5

Semifinals
8 | South Florida | 1 | 7
1 | East Carolina | 3 | 14
7 | Tulane | 8 | 11
2 | Houston | 11 | 8

Finals
1 | East Carolina | 6
7 | Tulane | 8

== NCAA Tournament ==
Tulane received the conference's automatic bid, and will play in the Baton Rouge Regional, opening up against host team No. 5 LSU. East Carolina received an at-large bid to the Charlottesville Regional, where their first game will be against Oklahoma.

== Conference leaders ==
Hitting leaders
| Stat | Player | Total |
|---|---|---|
| AVG | Chuck Ingram (WSU) | .366 |
| HR | Ben McCabe (UCF) | 18 |
| RBI | Brock Rodden (WSU) | 61 |
| R | Ben McCabe (UCF) | 62 |
| H | Ben McCabe (UCF) | 78 |
| SB | Brandon Burckel (HOU) | 24 |

Pitching leaders
| Stat | Player | Total |
|---|---|---|
| W | Payton Tolle (WSU) | 9 |
| L | Dylan Carmouche (TUL) | 8 |
| ERA | Grant Adler (WSU) | 2.41 |
| K | Dalton Fowler (MEM) | 104 |
| IP | Payton Tolle (WSU) | 82.2 |
| SV | Dalton Kendrick (MEM) | 12 |

== See also ==
- 2023 in baseball
