= Terry Rooney (baseball coach) =

American baseball coach and former pitcher

Current position
- Title: Recruiting Coordinator
- Team: Wake Forest
- Conference: ACC

Biographical details
- Born: November 29, 1973 (age 52); Fairfax County, Virginia, U.S.

Playing career
- 1993: Davis & Elkins College
- 1994–1996: Radford
- Position: Pitcher

Coaching career (HC unless noted)
- 1997: George Washington (Asst.)
- 1998–1999: James Madison (Asst.)
- 2000–2001: Old Dominion (Asst.)
- 2002–2003: Stetson (Asst.)
- 2004–2006: Notre Dame (Asst.)
- 2007–2008: LSU (Asst.)
- 2009–2016: UCF
- 2017: Alabama (AHC/Interim HC)
- 2018–2021: Houston (P)
- 2022–2023: Purdue (RC)
- 2024: LSU (RC)
- 2025–2026: South Carolina (P)
- 2027–Present: Wake Forest (RC)

Head coaching record
- Overall: 261–210 (.554)
- Tournaments: C-USA: 4–7; The American: 1–4; NCAA: 3–4

Accomplishments and honors

Awards
- AAC Coach of the Year (2014)

Terry Rooney (born November 29, 1973) is an American baseball coach and former pitcher. He played college baseball at Davis & Elkins College in 1993, transferring to Radford where he played from 1994 to 1996. Rooney then served as the head coach of the UCF Knights (2009–2016) and the interim head coach of the Alabama Crimson Tide (2017).

== Head coaching career ==
In 2009, Rooney replaced longtime UCF Knights head coach, Jay Bergman. On June 21, 2010, Rooney signed a four-year contract extension with the university, making him the Knights head baseball coach through 2014. In 2011, Rooney led the Knights to a 39–23 (12–12) season and their first NCAA tournament appearance under his leadership. UCF reached the tournament again in 2012. In 2014, the Knights' first year in the American Athletic Conference, Rooney was named conference Coach of the Year. Rooney left following the 2016 season after compiling a record of 261–210 at UCF.

== Assistant coaching career ==
From 1997–2003, Rooney was an assistant coach at George Washington, James Madison, Old Dominion and Stetson. In 1997, he was pitching coach of the Cotuit Kettleers, a collegiate summer baseball team in the Cape Cod League. In 2004, Rooney joined the staff at Notre Dame under head coach Paul Mainieri. In 2007, he followed Mainieri to LSU before leaving in 2009 to become the head coach of the UCF Knights. In 2017 following his tenure at UCF, he was the associate head coach/interim head coach at Alabama.

== Pitching coach career ==
Rooney became the pitching coach for the University of South Carolina Gamecocks for the 2025 season., of which he was fired with Monte Lee and John Hendry on May 22, 2026 after the 2025 season.

== Head coaching record ==
Record table
| Season | Team | Overall | Conference | Standing | Postseason |
|---|---|---|---|---|---|
UCF Knights (Conference USA) (2009–2013)
| 2009 | UCF | 22–35 | 9–15 | T–7th | |
| 2010 | UCF | 33–22 | 10–14 | T–8th | |
| 2011 | UCF | 39–23 | 12–12 | T–4th | NCAA Regional |
| 2012 | UCF | 45–17 | 16–8 | 2nd | NCAA Regional |
| 2013 | UCF | 29–30 | 13–11 | T-5th | |
| C–USA: | | 168–127 | 60–60 | | |
UCF Knights (American Athletic Conference) (2014–2016)
| 2014 | UCF | 36–23 | 17–7 | 2nd | |
| 2015 | UCF | 31–27 | 10–14 | 7th | |
| 2016 | UCF | 26–33 | 8–16 | T-7th | |
| AAC: | | 93–83 | 35–37 | | |
| Total: | | 261–210 | | | |
National champion Postseason invitational champion Conference regular season champion Conference regular season and conference tournament champion Division regular season champion Division regular season and conference tournament champion Conference tournament champion

== See also ==
- List of current NCAA Division I baseball coaches
