= Greg Lovelady =

American College baseball coach

Current position
- Title: Hitting coach
- Team: Stetson
- Conference: ASUN

Biographical details
- Born: January 11, 1979 (age 47); Miami, Florida, U.S.

Playing career
- 1998–2001: Miami (FL)
- 2001: Utica Blue Sox
- Position: Catcher

Coaching career (HC unless noted)
- 2002–2004: Miami (FL) (assistant)
- 2005–2013: Wright State (assistant)
- 2014–2016: Wright State
- 2017–2023: UCF
- 2024–2025: Purdue (assistant)
- 2026–present: Stetson (assistant)

Head coaching record
- Overall: 349–204

Accomplishments and honors

Championships
- AAC Regular season (2017); 2× Horizon League Regular season (2014, 2016); 2× Horizon League Tournament (2015, 2016)

Awards
- The American Coach of the Year (2017); 2× Horizon League Coach of the Year (2014, 2016)

Greg Lovelady (born January 11, 1979) is an American college baseball coach. Lovelady played college baseball at Miami (FL), where as a catcher and four-year letter winner, he won the 1999 College World Series and 2001 College World Series. He signed as an undrafted free agent with the Florida Marlins organization, and played one season with the Utica Blue Sox before turning to coaching. He served three more years at Miami, working with catchers. In his seven years in Coral Gables, the Hurricanes reached five College World Series, winning two, and appeared in the Super Regional round all seven years. In 2005, Lovelady accepted an assistant coach position at Wright State. Two years later, he added associate head coach duties. With Rob Cooper's move to Penn State, Lovelady was elevated to the top job.

== Head coaching record ==
Below is a table of Lovelady's yearly records as an NCAA head baseball coach.

Record table
Season	Team	Overall	Conference	Standing	Postseason
Wright State Raiders (Horizon League) (2014–2016)
2014	Wright State	35–22	25–4	1st	
2015	Wright State	43–17	21–8	2nd	NCAA Regional
2016	Wright State	46–17	23–6	1st	NCAA Regional
Wright State:		124–56	69–18		
UCF Knights (American Athletic Conference) (2017–2023)
2017	UCF	40–22	15–9	1st	NCAA Regional
2018	UCF	35–21	13–10	5th	
2019	UCF	36–22	11–13	6th	
2020	UCF	15–3	0–0		Season canceled due to COVID-19
2021	UCF	31–30	18–14	T-4th	The American tournament
2022	UCF	35–25	14–10	2nd	The American tournament
2023	UCF	33–26	12–12	4th	The American tournament
UCF:		225–149	83–68		
Total:		349–204			
National champion Postseason invitational champion Conference regular season champion Conference regular season and conference tournament champion Division regular season champion Division regular season and conference tournament champion Conference tournament champion

== See also ==
- List of current NCAA Division I baseball coaches
