= Dan DeMent =

American baseball coach (born 1978)

Daniel Kevin DeMent (born June 17, 1978) is an American professional baseball hitting coach in the Atlanta Braves organization.

DeMent is from Frankfort, Illinois. He attended Providence Catholic High School in New Lenox, Illinois, and then spent two years at Rend Lake College before he transferred to the University of Alabama at Birmingham (UAB) to play college baseball for the UAB Blazers baseball. After he graduated from UAB, DeMent signed with the Tampa Bay Rays as an undrafted free agent in 2000. He played in Minor League Baseball for the Rays and Washington Nationals. After the 2007 season, he transitioned into coaching. The Rays promoted DeMent to their major league coaching staff after the 2021 season. He stayed in that role through 2023.

In 2024, DeMent was named hitting coach of the Gwinnett Stripers the Triple-A affiliate of the Atlanta Braves.
