= Brian Shoop =

American baseball coach and player

Biographical details
- Born: Columbus, Ohio, U.S.
- Education: Malone '80

Playing career
- 1977–1980: Malone

Coaching career (HC unless noted)
- 1981–1982: Malone (asst.)
- 1983–1989: Mississippi State (asst.)
- 1990–2006: Birmingham–Southern
- 2007–2020: UAB

Head coaching record
- Overall: 1,058–683–1
- Tournaments: Big South: 4–6; C-USA: 8–15; NCAA: 1–4

Accomplishments and honors

Awards
- C-USA Coach of the Year (2014)

Brian Shoop is an American baseball former coach and player. He played college baseball at Malone University from 1977 to 1980. He then served as the head baseball coach of the Birmingham–Southern Panthers (1990–2006) and the UAB Blazers (2007–2020)

== Playing career ==
Shoop attended Malone University and played baseball for the Pioneers all four years. He was an all-district selection, and the team was Ohio NAIA champion each year.

== Coaching career ==
After finishing his playing career, Shoop became an assistant coach at his alma mater while completing a master's degree at nearby Kent State University. The Pioneers continued their streak of Ohio NAIA championships both years that Shoop was on the staff. He then became an assistant at Southeastern Conference power Mississippi State for seven years. In Starkville, Shoop worked with future Major League Baseball stars Will Clark and Rafael Palmeiro, among others. After his time with the Bulldogs, Shoop became head coach at Birmingham–Southern, leading that program for seventeen seasons. He amassed 692 wins, and led the team during most of its brief time at the Division I level. Under Shoop, the Panthers claimed a pair of Big South Conference titles and appeared in the Athens Regional. In their last year as an NAIA school, BSC won their first national championship after winning a school record 55 games.

After BSC decided to move their programs to Division III, Shoop accepted the head coach position across Birmingham at UAB. In six seasons with the Blazers, Shoop has coached 19 all-conference players and ten future professional players. After finishing in 2nd place in C-USA, Brian Shoop received the C-USA Head Coach of the Year award for 2014.

Shoop won his 800th game on May 14, 2010 with a victory over Tulane and his 900th on Feb. 22, 2014, with a 4–0 win over Youngstown State. On May 10, 2020, Shoop announced his retirement from coaching.

== Head coaching record ==
The following is a table of Shoop's head coaching records in NCAA competition. Although Shoop was the head coach of Birmingham–Southern from 1990–2006, the program did not join the NCAA until the start of the 2002 season.

Record table
Season	Team	Overall	Conference	Standing	Postseason
Birmingham–Southern Panthers (Independent) (2002–2003)
2002	Birmingham–Southern	32–20			
2003	Birmingham–Southern	33–18			
Birmingham–Southern Panthers (Big South Conference) (2004–2006)
2004	Birmingham–Southern	47–18	21–3	1st	NCAA Regional
2005	Birmingham–Southern	36–21	18–6	3rd	Big South Tournament
2006	Birmingham–Southern	33–22	18–6	1st	Big South Tournament
Birmingham–Southern:		699–300–1	57–15		
UAB Blazers (Conference USA) (2007–2020)
2007	UAB	25–33	12–12	T–4th	C-USA tournament
2008	UAB	26–34	7–17	8th	C-USA tournament
2009	UAB	31–26	11–12	6th	C-USA tournament
2010	UAB	28–25	11–13	T–5th	
2011	UAB	29–28	9–15	8th	C-USA tournament
2012	UAB	32–20	9–15	7th	NCAA Regional
2013	UAB	23–36	7–17	8th	C-USA tournament
2014	UAB	35–21	20–10	2nd	C-USA tournament
2015	UAB	30-24	15-15	6th	C-USA tournament
2016	UAB	21-34	12-18	9th	
2017	UAB	24–31	9–21	11th	
2018	UAB	21–33	13–17	8th	C-USA tournament
2019	UAB	27–29	12–18	T-9th	
2020	UAB	7–9	0–0		Season canceled due to COVID-19
UAB:		359–383	147–200		
Total:		1,058–683–1			
National champion Postseason invitational champion Conference regular season champion Conference regular season and conference tournament champion Division regular season champion Division regular season and conference tournament champion Conference tournament champion
