= Jay Bergman (baseball) =

American college baseball coach

Biographical details
- Born: February 6, 1939 (age 87)

Coaching career (HC unless noted)
- 1967–1973: Seminole CC
- 1973–1975: Florida (assistant)
- 1976–1981: Florida
- 1983–2008: UCF

Head coaching record
- Overall: 1,183–688–3 (.632)

Accomplishments and honors

Championships
- SEC Championship (1981); Atlantic Sun Championship (1993, 1995, 1996, 1997, 2000, 2001, 2002, 2004)

Jay Bergman (born February 6, 1939) is an American former college baseball coach. During his coaching career he served as the head coach of Seminole Community College, University of Florida and the University of Central Florida. The baseball stadium on the campus of the University of Central Florida was named Jay Bergman Field from 2001 to 2016.

In 1982, Bergman was fired as head coach at the University of Florida for violating Southeastern Conference rules and trying to conceal it. In 2006, Bergman was suspended for choking a pitcher during a game. Bergman was forced out at UCF with 10 games left in the 2008 season after being accused of harassing an equipment manager. Terry Rooney, the pitching coach at LSU, was hired to replace him.

Bergman finished his thirty-six season career as a head coach with an overall record of 1,183 wins, 688 losses, and 3 ties, and a winning percentage of .632. In the early 2000s, he won three A-Sun Coach of the Year awards.

== See also ==
- List of college baseball career coaching wins leaders
