= John Euliano Park =

Baseball stadium in Orlando, Florida, United States

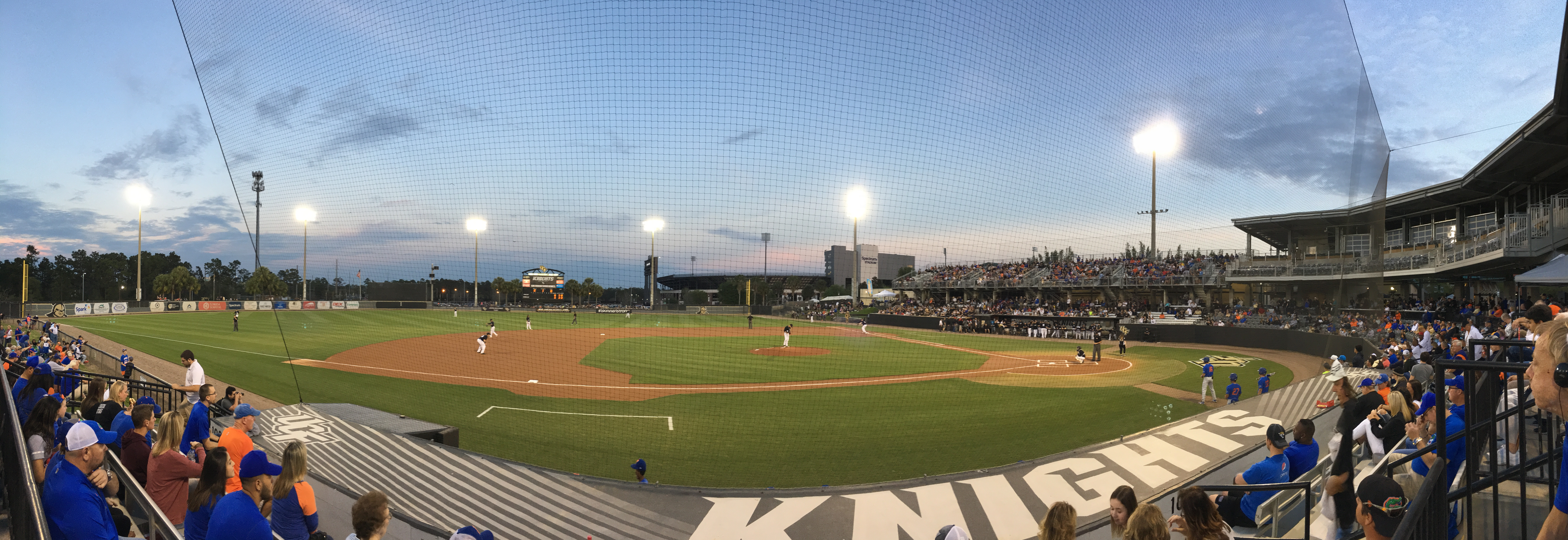
- Interactive map of John Euliano Park
- Former names: Jay Bergman Field (2001–2016)
- Location: Orlando, Florida, U.S.
- Coordinates: 28.609435°N 81.196105°W
- Owner: University of Central Florida
- Operator: University of Central Florida
- Capacity: 3,900 (2,600 seated)
- Surface: Natural Grass (Bermuda grass)
- Scoreboard: 22 feet (6.7 m) x 11 feet (3.4 m)
- Record attendance: 4,319
- Field size: Left Field: 320 feet (98 m); Left-Center Field: 360 feet (110 m); Center Field: 390 feet (119 m); Right-Center Field: 360 feet (110 m); Right Field: 320 feet (98 m)

Construction
- Opened: February 3, 2001
- Cost: $2,834,576
- Architect: DLR Group
- Main contractor: Eby

Tenant
- UCF Knights Baseball (NCAA) (2001–present)

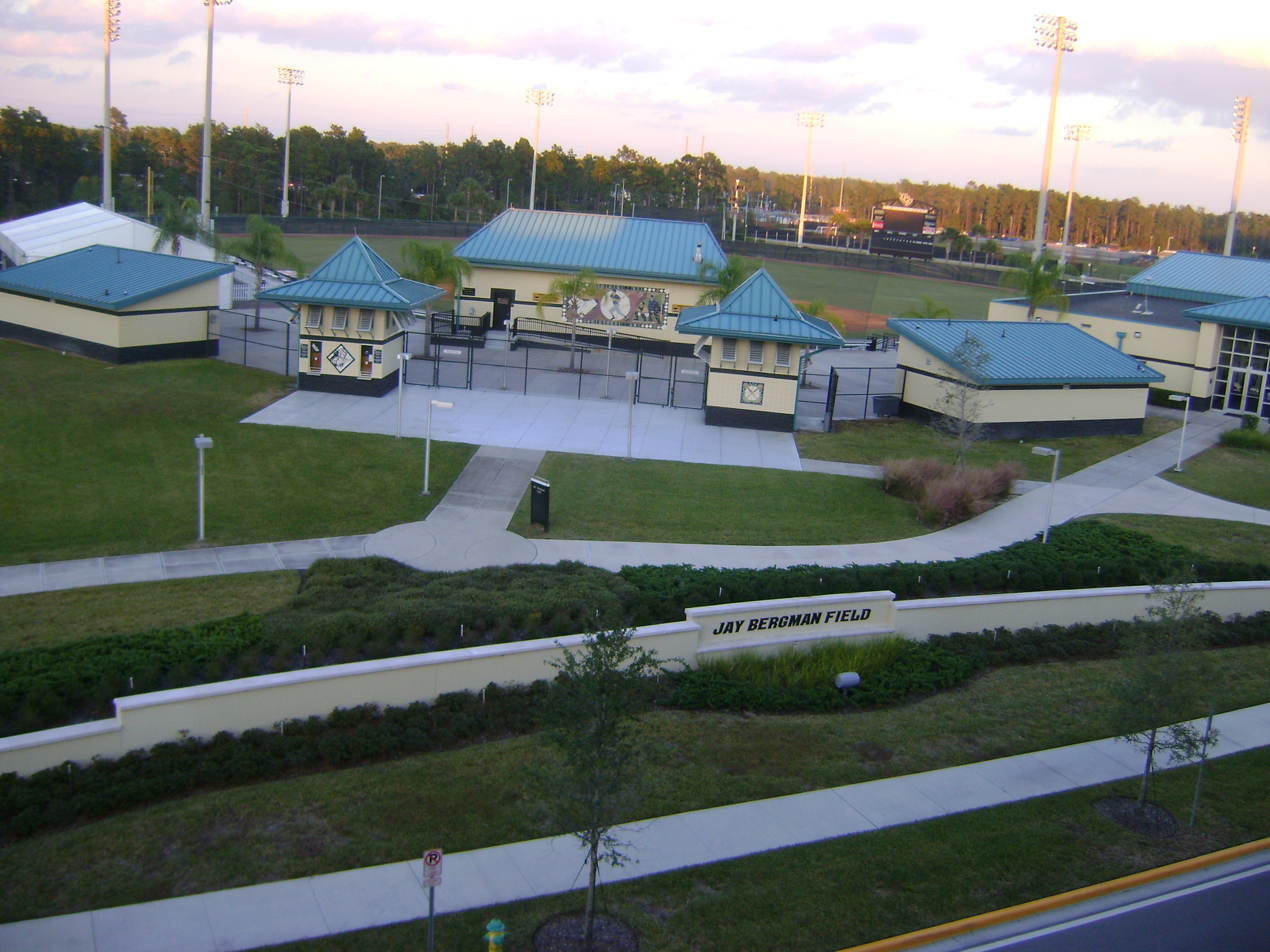
Exterior of Jay Bergman Field before 2011 expansion project

John Euliano Park, formerly Jay Bergman Field, is a baseball stadium located on the main campus of the University of Central Florida near Orlando in Orange County, Florida, USA. The stadium serves as the home of the UCF Knights baseball team.

== History ==
John Euliano Park was originally built in 2001 as a state-of-the-art facility, featuring an indoor training facility with three batting cages and two pitching mounds. The facility was originally named after the longtime head coach of the team, Jay Bergman. However, UCF relieved Jay Bergman of his duties on May 1, 2008, for alleged harassment towards an equipment manager.

In 2013, the Knights ranked 43rd among Division I baseball programs in attendance, averaging 1,457 per home game. The facility's single-game record attendance of 4,319 was set during a game against the #2 Florida Gators on March 3, 2015; the #14 Knights knocked off the Gators, 4–3.

Jay Bergman's name controversially remained on the park until August 22, 2016, when it was renamed for alumnus John Euliano. Euliano had given UCF Athletics a gift of $1.5 million for renovation of the stadium. The latest round of renovation began following the 2017 season.

Since moving into John Euliano Park in 2001, the Knights own a 222–123 (.643) record.

== Expansion ==
Beginning in late 2011, Jay Bergman Field underwent the first phase of a two-phase expansion, designed to increase the total capacity from 1,800 to 4,180.

The first phase involved construction of new lower-level bleachers along the first base line, replacing part of the grass berm. Additionally, a second level was added above the concourse on the first base side. Approximately 1,000 additional fans can be accommodated on the grass berms along the sides of left and right field, and in a "Party Deck" just beyond the right field fence. The total capacity for the 2012 and 2013 seasons is approximately 3,600 fans.

Due to monetary issues, the original plans for the second phase of expansion were scaled back. The current plan, expected to begin construction following the 2013 UCF baseball season, includes an elevated press box, outdoor club level seating, and two loge boxes. After the second phase of expansion, total capacity is expected to be around 3,900 (a reduction of approximately 300 seats from the original plan).

The expansion after 2017 seeded by John Euliano included a new Home Plate Tower with 300 club seats and an air-conditioned lounge, and a roof over the third base bleachers.

Seating Capacity by Season

Season	Total Capacity (Including Berms)
2001–11	2,230
2012–17	3,600
2018–present	3,900

== See also ==
- List of NCAA Division I baseball venues
- UCF Knights baseball
- University of Central Florida
- List of UCF Knights baseball seasons
- List of University of Central Florida alumni
