= UCF Knights baseball =

UCF Knights Baseball
- 2026 UCF Knights baseball team
- Founded: 1973 (52 years ago)
- University: University of Central Florida
- Head coach: Rich Wallace (3rd season)
- Conference: Big 12
- Location: Orlando, Florida
- Home stadium: John Euliano Park (capacity: 3,230)
- Nickname: Knights
- Colors: Black and gold

NCAA tournament appearances
- 1989, 1993, 1995, 1996, 1997, 2000, 2001, 2002, 2004, 2011, 2012, 2017, 2024, 2026

Conference tournament champions
- 1993, 1995, 1996, 1997, 2001, 2002

Conference regular season champions
- 2000, 2001, 2002, 2004, 2017

The UCF Knights baseball team represents the University of Central Florida in National Collegiate Athletic Association (NCAA) Division I. The Knights compete in the Big 12 Conference. The Knights play their home games on UCF's main campus in Orlando, Florida at John Euliano Park.

== History ==
=== Early history (1973–1983) ===
Though UCF baseball first took the field in 1973, its history dates back to 1970 with UCF's club baseball team, the FTU Goldsox. The Goldsox played in the Amateur Baseball League of Central Florida and were managed by Jack Pantelias, who led them from 1970 to midway through the 1972 season. When Pantelias resigned, he was replaced by Doug Holmquist, who would lead the team through the end of the season on an interim basis before being named head coach before the 1973 season. Bill Moon was the head coach from 1979 to 1982. The 1979 team was UCFs first championship team – sharing the Sunshine state conference title with Florida Southern University. UCF went 27–16 that year and played in the post season regionals. The team has been nationally ranked at times during the course of 11 seasons, including the highest ranking of No. 7 during both the 2001 and 2012 seasons.

=== Bergman era (1983–2008) ===
Jay Bergman took over the program in 1983 after serving as the head coach at Seminole Community College. The Knights first season in Division I was in 1985 under Bergman. The Knights earned a 52–34–1 record in their first D–I season. Bergman was forced to retire during the 2008 season after allegations surfaced of him harassing an equipment manager.

Bergman had a large amount of success in this position, leading UCF to Atlantic Sun Championships in 93, 95, 96, 97, 00, 01, 02, 04 and NCAA Regional Appearances in 89, 93, 95, 96, 97, 00, 01, 02, 04, and brought UCF to a national ranking of No. 7 in 2001. In honor of his long-term success with the Knights, on February 3, 2001, UCF opened and dedicated Jay Bergman Field.

=== Rooney era (2009–2016) ===
Terry Rooney became head coach in 2008 after serving as an assistant coach at LSU, Notre Dame, Stetson, Old Dominion, James Madison, and George Washington. In his second season, Rooney led the Knights to a 33–22 (10–14) record, 11 more wins than the prior season and the best conference record since the team started in Conference USA in 2006. On June 21, 2010, Rooney signed a four-year contract extension with the university, making him the Knights head baseball coach through 2014.

Following a 38–21 season, Rooney led the Knights to their first NCAA tournament under his leadership in 2011. The year was a high for the Knights, defeating the No 4. ranked Florida Gators in Gainesville and the then-ranked No. 5 Gators in Orlando. The Knights also defeated the No. 6 ranked Florida State Seminoles in Tallahassee during the 2011 campaign. In 2012, Rooney led the Knights to a No. 7 ranking during week ten, and an appearance in the Coral Gables Regional.

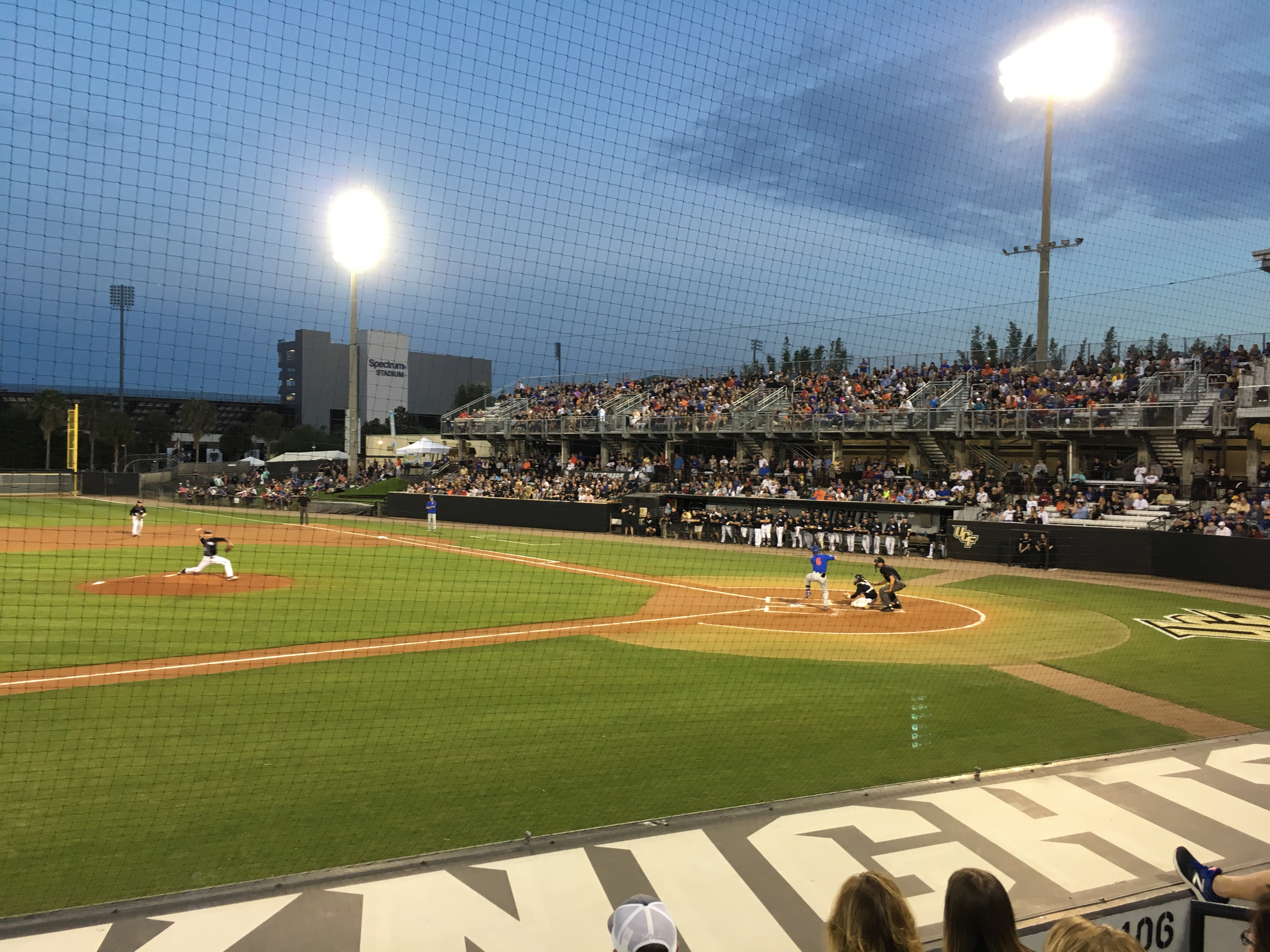
The Knights host Florida in a midweek game.

From 2013 to 2016, the Knights were 121–114 under Rooney's leadership. The Knights joined the American Athletic Conference (The American) in 2013. UCF did not appear in another NCAA tournament despite a 36–23 record in 2014 where Rooney won American Athletic Conference Coach of the Year. In 2015, the Knights were 22–7 and ranked No. 6 in the nation through their first 30 games but eventually ended the season 31–27. After going 26–33 in 2016 despite a 6–0 start, Rooney departed from UCF and eventually joined the Alabama staff as an assistant coach.

=== Lovelady era (2017–2023) ===
On August 22, 2016, Jay Bergman Field was renamed John Euliano Park.

Greg Lovelady was hired as Rooney's replacement in July 2016 after serving as Head Coach at Wright State. Lovelady brought immediate success back to the UCF Baseball program, leading the Knights to a 40–22 record in 2017. The Knights were crowned American Athletic Conference Regular season Champions but went 2–2 in the conference tournament, being eliminated by East Carolina in the semifinals. The Knights received a 2 seed in the Tallahassee Regional of the NCAA tournament but were eliminated by Florida State after losing their first game to Auburn. Despite a winning record in his 7 seasons at UCF, the Knights didn't make the NCAA tournament under Lovelady after the 2017 season, and he was eventually dismissed on May 27, 2023 ahead of the school's move to the Big 12.

=== Wallace era (2024–present) ===
On June 12, 2023, Florida State assistant coach Rich Wallace, an Orlando native and UCF alum, was hired as the 7th head coach of the program. Like his predecessor Lovelady, Wallace led the Knights to immediate success in his first season, going 37–21 in 2024, including being ranked at high as #17 in the D1baseball poll. After going 2–1 in the Big 12 tournament, the Knights received a 3 seed in the NCAA tournament, where they were placed in the Tallahassee region once again. After winning their first round game against Alabama, they lost to Florida State in the second round before defeating Stetson in the elimination round, only to be eliminated in the regional final by Florida State again.

== Championships ==
=== Conference tournament championships ===
Conference	Season
Atlantic Sun Conference	1993
Atlantic Sun Conference	1995
Atlantic Sun Conference	1996
Atlantic Sun Conference	1997
Atlantic Sun Conference	2001
Atlantic Sun Conference	2002
Total conference titles	6

=== Conference season championships ===
Conference	Season
Atlantic Sun Conference	2000
Atlantic Sun Conference	2001
Atlantic Sun Conference	2002
Atlantic Sun Conference	2004
American Athletic Conference	2017
Total conference titles	5

=== NCAA tournament ===
Year	Coach	Record	Pct.	Notes
1989	Jay Bergman	2–2	.500	Eliminated by Villanova in the East Regional
1993	Jay Bergman	1–2	.333	Eliminated by Notre Dame in the East Regional
1995	Jay Bergman	1–2	.333	Eliminated by Ole Miss in the Atlantic Regional
1996	Jay Bergman	1–2	.333	Eliminated by UMass in the East Regional
1997	Jay Bergman	0–2	.000	Eliminated by Florida State in the East Regional
2000	Jay Bergman	2–2	.500	Eliminated by Florida State in the Tallahassee Regional
2001	Jay Bergman	2–2	.500	Eliminated by South Carolina in the Columbia Regional
2002	Jay Bergman	1–2	.333	Eliminated by USF in the Tallahassee Regional
2004	Jay Bergman	3–2	.600	Eliminated by Florida State in the Tallahassee Regional
2011	Terry Rooney	1–2	.333	Eliminated by Alabama in the Tallahassee Regional
2012	Terry Rooney	2–2	.500	Eliminated by Stony Brook in the Coral Gables Regional
2017	Greg Lovelady	0–2	.000	Eliminated by Florida State in the Tallahassee Regional
2024	Rich Wallace	2–2	.500	Eliminated by Florida State in the Tallahassee Regional
2026	Rich Wallace	1–2	.333	Eliminated by Auburn in the Auburn Regional
Totals		19–28	.404	13 Appearances
The format of the tournament has changed through the years.

== Stadium ==
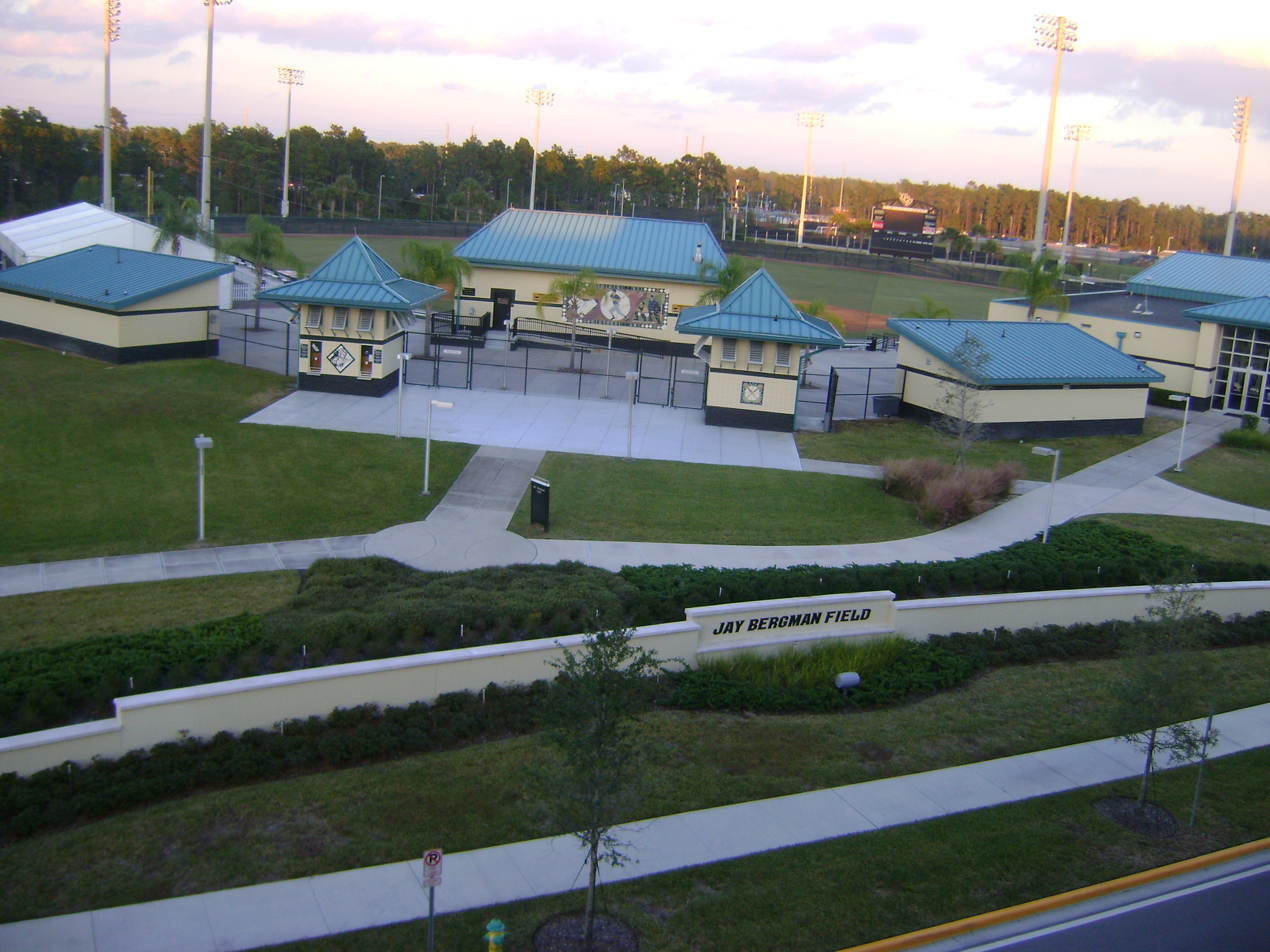
John Euliano Park

John Euliano Park is located on UCF's main campus in Orlando, Florida. It was originally built in 2001 as a state-of-the-art facility, and features an indoor training facility with three batting cages and two pitching mounds. The facility was originally named after the Knights' former head coach, Jay Bergman. It retained the name until 2016, when it was named after alumnus and donor John Euliano.

=== Renovations ===
Within the last few years, John Euliano Park has been expanded from 1,980 seats to 2,230. The stadium can also accommodate another 1,000 fans on grass berms along the first and third base lines. In the next few years seating will be further expanded to a total capacity at 4,180. In addition, a new digital scoreboard and beautification has taken place as part of the renovation.

== Head coaches ==
Tenure	Coach	Seasons	Record	Pct.
1973–1975	Doug Holmquist	3	66–41–1	.616
1976–1977	Jack Sexton	2	43–41	.512
1978–1982	Bill Moon	5	124–110–6	.529
1983–2008	Jay Bergman	26	994–594–3	.626
2008	Craig Cozart^{†}	1	4–8	.333
2009–2016	Terry Rooney	7	260–211	.552
2017–2023	Greg Lovelady	7	225–149	.602
2024–present	Rich Wallace	3	98–70	.583
Totals	8 coaches	53 seasons	1,815–1,233–10	.595
^{†} Denotes interim coach

== UCF and MLB ==
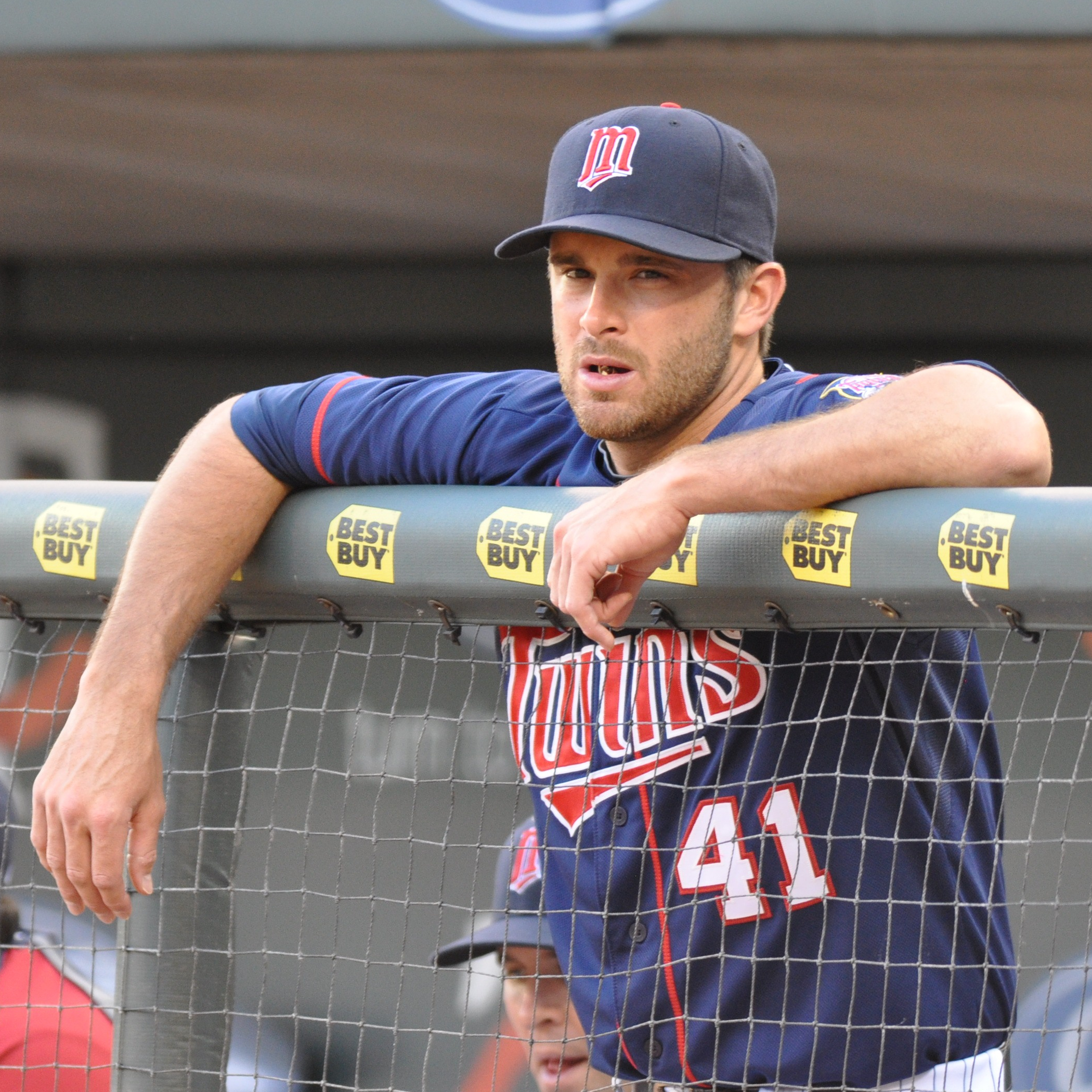
Drew Butera

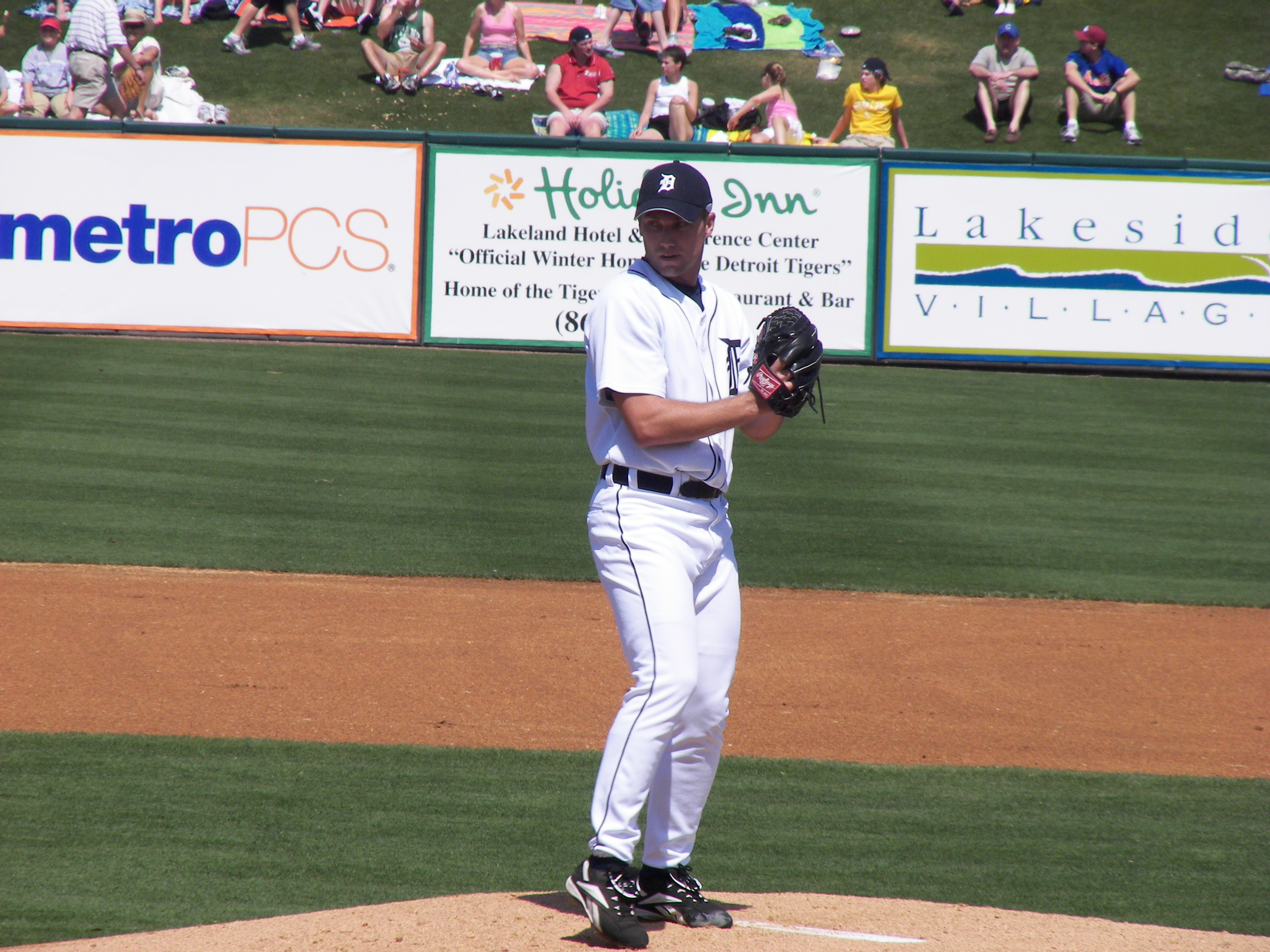
Mike Maroth

- Cody Allen – Former Pitcher, Cleveland Indians
- Drew Butera – Former Catcher, Kansas City Royals
- Matt Fox – Former Pitcher, Boston Red Sox, Minnesota Twins, and Seattle Mariners
- Alex Freeland – Infielder, Los Angeles Dodgers
- Ben Lively – Pitcher, Cincinnati Reds
- Mike Maroth – Former Pitcher, Detroit Tigers and St. Louis Cardinals
- Dylan Moore – Outfielder, Seattle Mariners
- Chad Mottola – Former Outfielder, Cincinnati Reds, Toronto Blue Jays, Miami Marlins, and Baltimore Orioles
- Rob Radlosky – Former Pitcher, Minnesota Twins
- Eric Skoglund – Former Pitcher, Kansas City Royals
- Esix Snead – Former Outfielder, New York Mets
- Darnell Sweeney – Former Infielder, Philadelphia Phillies
- Clay Timpner – Former Outfielder, San Francisco Giants
- Thaddeus Ward – Pitcher, Washington Nationals
- Daniel Winkler – Former Pitcher, Atlanta Braves
- Colton Gordon - Pitcher, Milwaukee Brewers
- Pitcher Zach Eflin (Tampa Bay Rays) and Infielder Ryan Mountcastle (Baltimore Orioles) were committed to play for UCF, but were drafted (Eflin 33rd overall in the 2012 MLB draft and Mountcastle 36th overall in 2015 MLB draft)

== See also ==
- List of NCAA Division I baseball programs
- List of UCF Knights baseball seasons
