= Eric Skoglund =

American baseball player (born 1992)

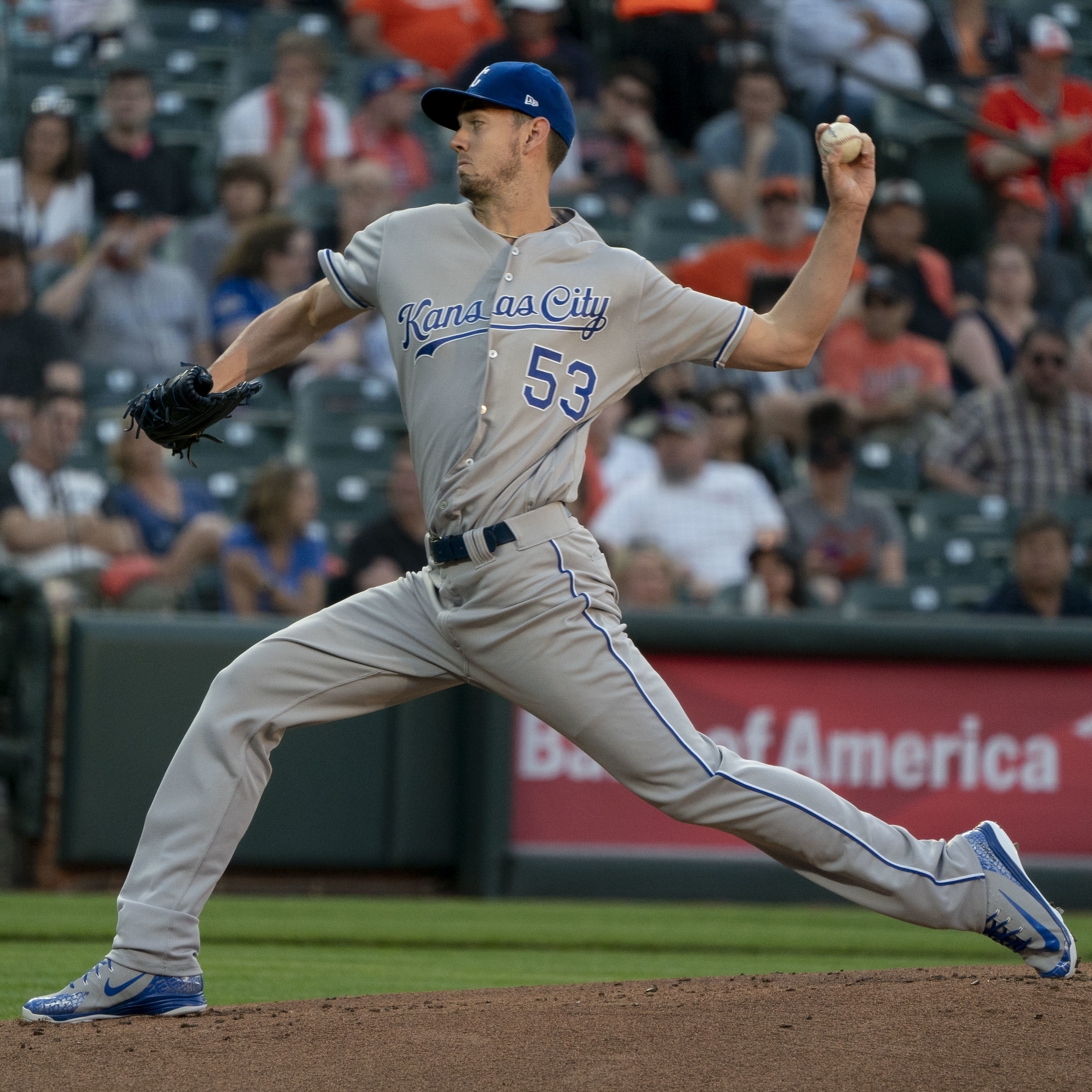
- Skoglund with the Kansas City Royals

New College of Florida Mighty Banyans
- Pitcher
- Born: October 26, 1992 (age 33); Sarasota, Florida, U.S.
- Batted: Left Threw: Left

MLB debut
- May 30, 2017, for the Kansas City Royals

Last MLB appearance
- September 27, 2019, for the Kansas City Royals

MLB statistics
- Win–loss record: 2–11
- Earned run average: 6.61
- Strikeouts: 67
- Stats at Baseball Reference

Teams
- Kansas City Royals (2017–2019)

Eric Lawrence Skoglund (born October 26, 1992) is an American former professional baseball pitcher. He played in Major League Baseball (MLB) for the Kansas City Royals from 2017 to 2019.

== Playing career ==
=== Amateur ===
Skoglund attended Sarasota High School in Sarasota, Florida. He was drafted by the Pittsburgh Pirates in the 16th round of the 2011 Major League Baseball draft but did not sign and attended the University of Central Florida (UCF), where he played college baseball. In 2012, he played collegiate summer baseball with the Harwich Mariners of the Cape Cod Baseball League, and returned to the league in 2013 to play for the Bourne Braves. After his junior season, he was drafted by the Kansas City Royals in the third round of the 2014 MLB draft.

=== Kansas City Royals ===
Skoglund made his professional debut with the Idaho Falls Chukars in 2014 and spent the whole season there, going 0–2 with a 5.09 ERA in nine games (eight starts). He pitched 2015 with the Wilmington Blue Rocks where he compiled a 6–3 record and 3.52 ERA in 15 starts and 2016 with the Northwest Arkansas Naturals where he pitched to a 7–10 record and 3.45 ERA in 27 games started. He started 2017 with the Naturals, but was promoted to the Omaha Storm Chasers after only one start with the Naturals. On May 30, he was called up by the Royals, making his major league debut the same day.

In his major league debut, Skoglund pitched 6 1/3 scoreless innings with five strikeouts, allowing only two hits and one walk in a 1–0 win over the Detroit Tigers. Skoglund was sent back down to Omaha on June 19, and he spent the remainder of the 2017 season going back and forth between Omaha and Kansas City. In 19 starts for Omaha, he was 4–5 with a 4.11 ERA and in seven games (five starts) for Kansas City, he posted a 1–2 record and 9.50 ERA. Skoglund began 2018 in Kansas City's opening rotation. He was 1–5 in 9 starts before being placed on the disabled list.

On January 16, 2019, Skoglund was suspended 80 games after testing positive for Ostarine and Ligandrol. He made 6 appearances (4 starts) for Kansas City in 2019, going 0–3 with a 9.00 ERA and 4 strikeouts in 21.0 innings pitched. He was designated for assignment by the Royals on March 25, 2020. Due to the transactions freeze, Skoglund remained in DFA limbo through June. On June 28, Skoglund officially cleared waivers and was sent outright to Triple-A Omaha. He did not play in a game in 2020 due to the cancellation of the minor league season because of the COVID-19 pandemic.

In May 2021, Skoglund underwent Tommy John surgery, and missed the entire 2021 season. He was placed on the injured list of the Royals’ Triple-A affiliate in Omaha to begin the 2022 season before being activated and assigned to Double-A. On July 3, he made his return from injury, giving up two earned runs on four hits while striking out one in 1.1 innings pitched for the Naturals. He made 15 total appearances (5 starts) split between Triple-A Omaha, Double-A Northwest Arkansas, the High-A Quad Cities River Bandits, and the rookie-level Arizona Complex League Royals before he was released on August 10.

== Coaching career ==
In June 2023, Skoglund was hired to serve as the head pitching coach at the New College of Florida.
