= UAB Blazers baseball =

American college baseball team

- 2026 UAB Blazers baseball team
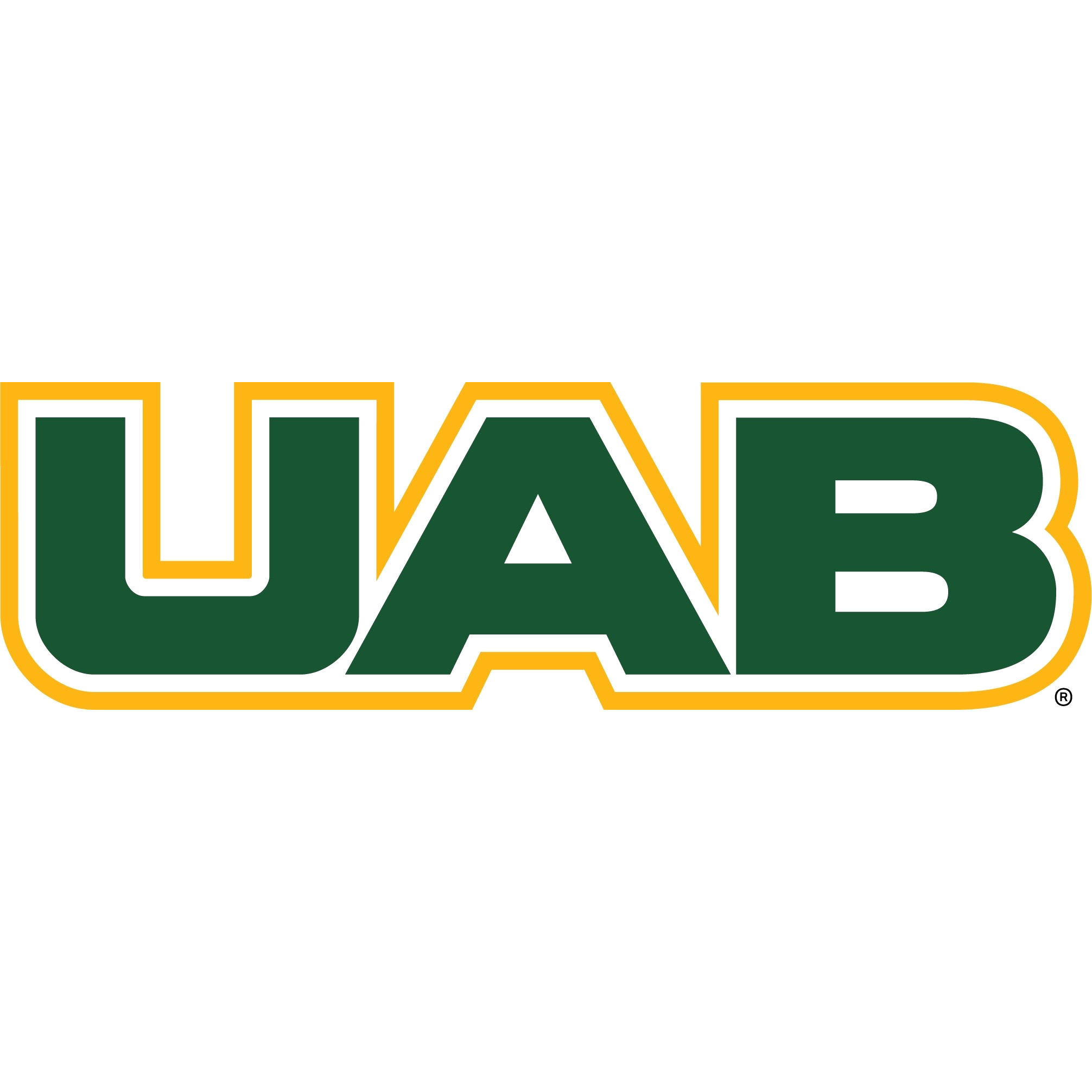
- Founded: 1979; 47 years ago
- University: University of Alabama at Birmingham
- Head coach: Casey Dunn (5th season)
- Conference: The American
- Location: Birmingham, Alabama
- Home stadium: Jerry D. Young Memorial Field (capacity: 1,000)
- Nickname: Blazers
- Colors: UAB Green and UAB Gold

NCAA tournament appearances
- 1991, 2012

Conference tournament champions
- Sun Belt: 1991; Great Midwest: 1992, 1994; C-USA: 2012

Conference regular season champions
- Great Midwest: 1992

For information on all University of Alabama at Birmingham sports, see UAB Blazers

The UAB Blazers baseball team is a varsity intercollegiate athletic team of the University of Alabama at Birmingham in Birmingham, Alabama, United States. The team is a member of the American Conference, which is part of the National Collegiate Athletic Association's Division I. UAB's first baseball team was fielded in 1979. The team plays its home games at Jerry D. Young Memorial Field in Birmingham, Alabama. The Blazers are coached by Casey Dunn.

== History ==
The UAB fielded its first varsity baseball team in 1979 as an independent before joining the Sun Belt Conference in 1980. Harry Walker, the program’s first head coach, led UAB through the 1986 season, a tenure that included the 1981 Sun Belt North Division title. Pete Rancont took over in 1987 and coached the program for 13 seasons. Under Rancont, UAB reached its first NCAA Tournament in 1991, advancing to the Central Regional in Austin, Texas. The program moved to the Great Midwest Conference in 1992 and won both the regular-season and tournament titles in its first year in the league, with Rancont earning conference coach of the year honors.

UAB joined Conference USA in 1996 and remained there through the 2023 season. Results in C-USA were mixed, with the team producing winning records in some seasons and finishing in the lower half of the standings in others. Larry Giangrosso coached from 2000 through 2006, followed by Brian Shoop, whose tenure ran from 2007 through the pandemic-shortened 2020 season. Shoop led the Blazers to their second NCAA Tournament appearance in 2012, when UAB won the Conference USA Tournament and advanced to the Tallahassee Regional. A Shoop-era highlight came in 2014, when the team posted the program’s lowest team ERA at 2.87.

Perry Roth served as head coach for a single season in 2021 before Casey Dunn was hired ahead of the 2022 campaign. UAB left Conference USA for the American Conference in 2024. Through the start of the 2026 season, the program has recorded 23 winning seasons, two NCAA Tournament appearances, and 62 alumni who have reached professional baseball, including 36 drafted players. Home games are played at Regions Field, which opened in 2013, while Young Memorial Field, opened in 1984, remains in use on campus.

== Conference affiliations ==
American logo in UAB's colors

- NCAA Division I Independent (1978-1979)
- Sun Belt Conference (1980–1991)
- Great Midwest Conference (1992–1995)
- Conference USA (1996–2023)
- American Conference (2024–present)

== Head Coaches ==
UAB has had six head coaches.

Coach	Years	Seasons	Record	Pct.
Harry Walker	1979–1986	8	211–171	.552
Pete Rancont	1987–1999	13	368–374–1	.496
Larry Giangrosso	2000–2006	7	169–218	.437
Brian Shoop	2007–2020	14	361–407	.470
Perry Roth (interim)	2021	1	18–36	.333
Casey Dunn	2022–present	4	98–121	.447
Total		47	1,252–1,271–1	.496

== Year by year results ==
UAB baseball history year-by-year results.

Season	Coach	Overall	Conf.	Standing	Postseason
Independent (1979)
1979	Harry Walker	21–29	—	—	
Sun Belt Conference (1980–1991)
1980	Harry Walker	30–20	6–6	2nd	
1981	Harry Walker	40–17	12–0	1st (North)	
1982	Harry Walker	14–18	4–2	1st (North)	
1983	Harry Walker	29–18	11–6	2nd (West)	
1984	Harry Walker	27–16	8–9	3rd (West)	
1985	Harry Walker	26–27	5–11	3rd( West)	
1986	Harry Walker	24–26	7–10	3rd (West)	
1987	Pete Rancont	23–22	8–10	4th (West)	
1988	Pete Rancont	22–28–1	4–12	4th (West)	
1989	Pete Rancont	28–27	7–11	3rd (West)	
1990	Pete Rancont	27–26	8–10	2nd (West)	
1991	Pete Rancont	29–30	9–7	2nd (West)	NCAA Regional
Great Midwest Conference (1992–1995)
1992	Pete Rancont	43–18	17–1	1st	
1993	Pete Rancont	35–23	12–6	2nd	
1994	Pete Rancont	32–23	16–6	2nd	
1995	Pete Rancont	34–22	13–9	2nd	
Conference USA (1996–2023)
1996	Pete Rancont	33–25	13–11	4th	
1997	Pete Rancont	31–29	14–13	6th	
1998	Pete Rancont	29–24	15–12	4th	
1999	Pete Rancont	22–31	7–20	9th	
2000	Larry Giangrosso	28–32	10–15	7th	
2001	Larry Giangrosso	25–30	6–21	10th	
2002	Larry Giangrosso	16–40	7–23	10th	
2003	Larry Giangrosso	27–26	12–17	9th	
2004	Larry Giangrosso	30–29	13–16	7th	
2005	Larry Giangrosso	31–27	14–16	8th	
2006	Larry Giangrosso	19–38	6–18	6th	
2007	Brian Shoop	25–33	12–12	4th	
2008	Brian Shoop	26–34	7–17	8th	
2009	Brian Shoop	31–26	11–12	6th	
2010	Brian Shoop	28–25	11–13	T-5th	
2011	Brian Shoop	29–28	9–15	7th	
2012	Brian Shoop	32–30	9–15	7th	NCAA Regional
2013	Brian Shoop	23–36	7–17	8th	
2014	Brian Shoop	35–21	20–10	2nd	
2015	Brian Shoop	33–25	15–15	2nd	
2016	Brian Shoop	21–34	12–18	9th	
2017	Brian Shoop	24–31	9–21	11th	
2018	Brian Shoop	21–33	13–17	8th	
2019	Brian Shoop	27–29	12–18	9th	
2020	Brian Shoop	7–9	0–0	—	Season canceled (COVID-19)
2021	Perry Roth (interim)	18–36	11–21	6th (West)	
2022	Casey Dunn	31–25	13–17	8th	
2023	Casey Dunn	17–36	8–22	10th	
American Conference (2024–present)
2024	Casey Dunn	26–29	13–14	5th	
2025	Casey Dunn	24–30	8–19	10th	
Total		1,252–1,271–1			2 NCAA Appearances

== Facilities ==
=== Jerry D. Young Memorial Field ===
Jerry D. Young Memorial Field is the home of UAB baseball. The stadium opened in 1984 and is named after former UAB administrator Jerry D. Young, who played a key role in establishing the program. It seats 1,000. In 2022 artificial turf was installed as the playing surface. UAB plays select games at Regions Field.

== UAB in the NCAA tournament ==
Year	Record	Pct	Notes
1991	1–2	.333	Central Regional
2012	0–2	.000	Tallahassee Regional
TOTALS	1-4	.200	

== Blazers in Major League Baseball ==
Since the Major League Baseball draft began in 1965, UAB has had 28 players selected.

Notable players include:

- Graham Ashcraft
- Dan DeMent
- Mike Goff
- Chris Hammond
- Brewer Hicklen
- Héctor Villanueva
- Mark Morrison
- Garrett Whitlock

== See also ==
- List of NCAA Division I baseball programs
