= List of Louisiana Tech Bulldogs baseball seasons =

This is a list of Louisiana Tech Bulldogs baseball seasons. The Louisiana Tech Bulldogs baseball program is a college baseball team that represents Louisiana Tech University in Conference USA in the National Collegiate Athletic Association. Louisiana Tech has played their home games at J. C. Love Field at Pat Patterson Park in Ruston, Louisiana since 1971.

The Bulldogs have won 21 conference championships, won 2 conference tournament championships, and have played in the NCAA Division I Baseball Championship 7 times.

== Season results ==
National champions	College World Series berth	NCAA tournament berth	Conference tournament champions	Conference/Division regular season champions

Season	Head coach	Conference	Season results									Tournament results		Final poll (Note: Collegiate Baseball began team rankings in 1959.)
Season	Head coach	Conference	Overall				Conference					Conference	Postseason (Note: Postseason play involving the NCAA Division I Baseball Championship began in 1947.)	CB
Season	Head coach	Conference	Wins	Losses	Ties	%	Wins	Losses	Ties	%	Finish	Conference	Postseason	CB
Louisiana Tech Bulldogs
1940	George "Blue" Hogg	Louisiana Intercollegiate Conference				–				–			—	—
1941	George "Blue" Hogg	Louisiana Intercollegiate Conference				–				–	1st		—	—
1942	George "Blue" Hogg	Louisiana Intercollegiate Conference				–				–			—	—
1943	Louisiana Tech did not field a baseball team for the 1943 or 1944 seasons due to World War II.													
1944	Louisiana Tech did not field a baseball team for the 1943 or 1944 seasons due to World War II.													
1945	Berry Hinton	Louisiana Intercollegiate Conference	3	1	0	.750	3	1	0	.750	1st		—	—
1946	Berry Hinton	Louisiana Intercollegiate Conference	6	3	0	.667	4	0	0	1.000	1st		—	—
1947	Berry Hinton	Louisiana Intercollegiate Conference	17	6	0	.739	12	2	0	.857	1st		—	—
1948	Berry Hinton	Louisiana Intercollegiate Conference	19	11	0	.633	13	1	0	.929	1st		—	—
1949	Berry Hinton	Gulf States	10	9	0	.526	9	5	0	.643			—	—
1950	Berry Hinton	Gulf States	11	5	0	.688	11	5	0	.688			—	—
1951	Berry Hinton	Gulf States	13	9	0	.591	11	5	0	.688			—	—
1952	Berry Hinton	Gulf States	9	10	0	.474	8	8	0	.500			—	—
1953	Berry Hinton	Gulf States	7	7	0	.500	4	3	0	.571			—	—
1954	Berry Hinton	Gulf States	10	10	0	.500	4	3	0	.571	1st		—	—
1955	Berry Hinton	Gulf States	8	12	0	.400	6	6	0	.500			—	—
1956	Berry Hinton	Gulf States	12	8	0	.600	7	4	0	.636			—	—
1957	Berry Hinton	Gulf States	9	12	0	.429	7	6	0	.538			—	—
1958	Berry Hinton	Gulf States	13	5	0	.722	9	4	0	.692	1st		—	—
1959	Berry Hinton	Gulf States	18	6	0	.750	12	3	0	.800	1st		—	—
1960	Berry Hinton	Gulf States	19	4	0	.826	9	4	0	.692	1st		—	—
1961	Berry Hinton	Gulf States	21	6	0	.778	15	4	0	.789	1st		—	—
1962	Berry Hinton	Gulf States	19	9	0	.679	13	7	0	.650			—	—
1963	Berry Hinton	Gulf States				–				–			—	—
1964	Berry Hinton	Gulf States	18	15	0	.545	7	13	0	.350			—	—
1965	Berry Hinton	Gulf States	23	12	0	.657	9	11	0	.450			—	—
1966	Berry Hinton	Gulf States	23	19	0	.548	14	10	0	.583			—	—
1967	Berry Hinton	Gulf States	18	18	0	.500	10	12	0	.455		—	—	—
1968	Pat Patterson	Gulf States	19	23	0	.452	10	14	0	.417	T–5th	—	—	—
1969	Pat Patterson	Gulf States	17	20	0	.459	11	13	0	.458			—	—
1970	Pat Patterson	Gulf States	21	18	0	.538	6	14	0	.300		—	—	—
1971	Pat Patterson	Gulf States	36	14	0	.720	16	8	0	.667	1st	—	Regional semifinal	—
1972	Pat Patterson	Southland	34	14	0	.708	11	6	0	.647	3rd	—	—	—
1973	Pat Patterson	Southland	27	17	1	.611	9	7	0	.563	3rd	—	—	—
1974	Pat Patterson	Southland	29	19	0	.604	11	4	0	.733	1st	—	District 6 Regional	13
1975	Pat Patterson	Southland	32	15	0	.681	10	5	0	.667	T–1st	1st	South Central Regional	—
1976	Pat Patterson	Southland	20	22	0	.476	6	9	0	.400	T–5th	—	—	—
1977	Pat Patterson	Southland	32	19	0	.627	6	8	0	.429	4th	—	—	—
1978	Pat Patterson	Southland	46	21	0	.687	16	4	0	.800	1st	—	South Central Regional	—
1979	Pat Patterson	Southland	32	17	0	.653	11	5	0	.688	2nd	—	—	—
1980	Pat Patterson	Southland	43	24	1	.640	10	3	0	.769	1st (North)	1st	Central Regional	15
1981	Pat Patterson	Southland	34	19	0	.642	8	8	0	.500	2nd (North)	—	—	—
1982	Pat Patterson	Southland	40	26	0	.606	7	5	0	.583	T–1st (North)	Finals	—	—
1983	Pat Patterson	Southland	20	30	0	.400	5	8	0	.385	2nd (East)	—	—	—
1984	Pat Patterson	Southland	36	23	0	.610	8	9	0	.471	4th	—	—	—
1985	Pat Patterson	Southland	35	12	0	.745	11	3	0	.786	2nd	—	—	—
1986	Pat Patterson	Southland	36	25	0	.590	13	5	0	.722	1st	—	South I Regional	19
1987	Pat Patterson	Southland	43	14	0	.754	12	4	0	.750	1st (East)	1st	South II Regional	27
1988	Pat Patterson	American South	42	19	0	.689	10	4	0	.714	2nd	Final	—	—
1989	Pat Patterson	American South	38	20	0	.655	8	7	0	.533	T–3rd	Final	—	—
1990	Pat Patterson	American South	29	31	0	.483	8	7	0	.533	3rd	Semifinal	—	—
1991	Mike Kane	American South	31	26	0	.544	9	8	0	.529	4th	Semifinal	—	—
1992	Mike Kane	Sun Belt	31	18	0	.633	15	5	0	.750	1st (West)		—	—
1993	Mike Kane	Sun Belt	25	25	0	.500	11	8	0	.579	2nd (West)		—	—
1994	Mike Kane	Sun Belt	22	26	0	.458	8	16	0	.333	4th (West)	—	—	—
1995	Mike Kane	Sun Belt	19	33	0	.365	8	19	0	.296	T–8th	—	—	—
1996	Randy Davis	Sun Belt	23	31	0	.426	9	17	0	.346	T–9th	—	—	—
1997	Randy Davis	Sun Belt	26	30	0	.464	15	12	0	.556	4th		—	—
1998	Randy Davis	Sun Belt	21	34	0	.382	8	18	0	.308	9th	—	—	—
1999	Jeff Richardson	Sun Belt	20	37	0	.351	10	22	0	.313	T–6th		—	—
2000	Jeff Richardson	Sun Belt	26	29	0	.473	13	15	0	.464	6th		—	—
2001	Jeff Richardson	Sun Belt	32	26	0	.552	12	14	0	.462	6th	Semifinal	—	—
2002	Jeff Richardson	WAC	21	37	0	.362	7	23	0	.233	5th	—	—	—
2003	Wade Simoneaux	WAC	18	34	1	.349	10	20	0	.333	6th	—	—	—
2004	Wade Simoneaux	WAC	20	38	0	.345	10	20	0	.333	6th	—	—	—
2005	Wade Simoneaux	WAC	17	39	0	.304	9	20	0	.310	6th	—	—	—
2006	Wade Simoneaux	WAC	33	25	0	.569	11	13	0	.458	5th		—	—
2007	Wade Simoneaux	WAC	35	24	0	.593	14	10	0	.583	3rd		—	—
2008	Wade Simoneaux	WAC	23	31	0	.426	7	23	0	.233	7th	—	—	—
2009	Wade Simoneaux	WAC	29	22	0	.569	13	11	0	.542	2nd		—	—
2010	Wade Simoneaux	WAC	27	30	0	.474	11	13	0	.458	5th		—	—
2011	Wade Simoneaux	WAC	34	27	0	.557	12	12	0	.500	T–3rd	Semifinal	—	—
2012	Wade Simoneaux	WAC	27	28	0	.491	7	11	0	.389	6th	Semifinal	—	—
2013	Wade Simoneaux	WAC	19	37	0	.339	6	21	0	.222	10th	—	—	—
2014	Wade Simoneaux	Conference USA	15	35	0	.300	5	25	0	.167	13th	—	—	—
2015	Greg Goff	Conference USA	25	27	0	.481	8	21	0	.276	12th	—	—	—
2016	Greg Goff	Conference USA	42	20	0	.677	19	11	0	.633	5th	Semifinal	Starkville Regional	—
2017	Lane Burroughs	Conference USA	36	20	0	.643	17	13	0	.567	5th	First round	—	—
2018	Lane Burroughs	Conference USA	39	20	0	.661	21	9	0	.700	2nd	Second round	—	—
2019	Lane Burroughs	Conference USA	34	24	0	.586	17	13	0	.567	3rd	First round	—	—
2020	Lane Burroughs	Conference USA	11	6	0	.647	—	—	—	—	—	—	—	—
2021	Lane Burroughs	Conference USA	42	20	0	.677	22	8	0	.733	1st (West)	Final	Ruston Regional	29
2022	Lane Burroughs	Conference USA	43	21	0	.672	20	10	0	.667	2nd	Champions	Austin Regional	—
2023	Lane Burroughs	Conference USA	28	31	0	.475	15	15	0	.500	6th	Second round	—	—
2024	Lane Burroughs	Conference USA	45	19	0	.703	18	6	0	.750	1st	Final	Fayetteville Regional	—
2025	Lane Burroughs	Conference USA	32	25	0	.561	14	12	0	.538	5th	Quarterfinal	—	—
2026	Lane Burroughs	Conference USA	33	25	0	.569	19	11	0	.633	T–4th	Pool Play	—	—
