= List of Rice Owls baseball seasons =

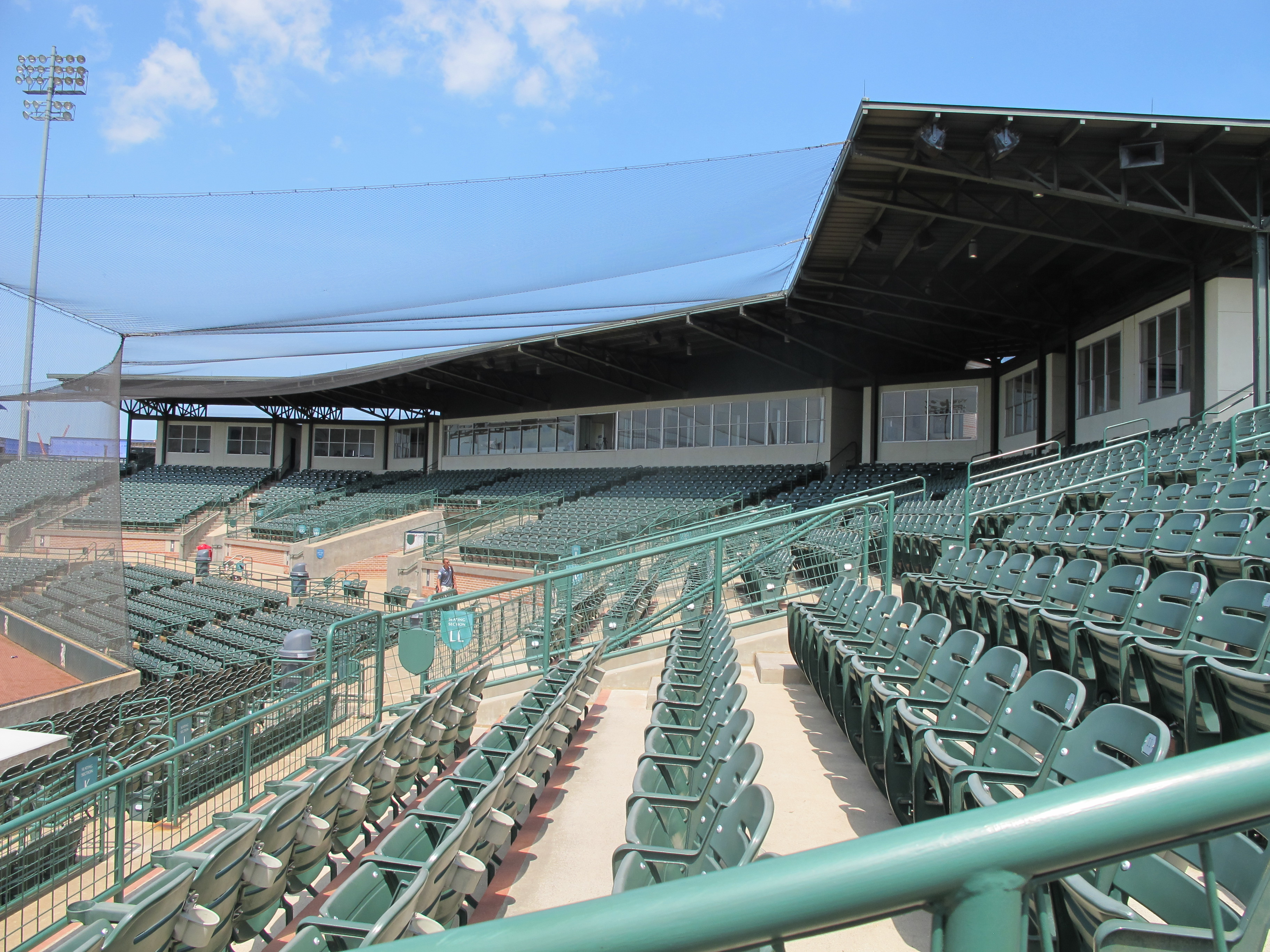
Reckling Park

This is a list of Rice Owls baseball seasons. The Rice Owls baseball team has represented Rice University dating back to its inception in 1913. The Owls played as a founding member of the Southwest Conference from its inception until the conference disbanded following the 1996 season. Since then, Rice has played in the Western Athletic Conference, Conference USA, and the American Conference.

Rice won the College World Series in 2003.

== Season results ==
National champions	College World Series berth	NCAA tournament berth	Conference Tournament champions	Conference Championships

Season	Head coach	Conference	Season Results									Tournament Results		Final Poll (Note: Collegiate Baseball began team rankings in 1959. Baseball America began during the 1981 season. The Coaches' Poll (published by USA Today's Sports Weekly and ESPN) began publishing its rankings during the 1992 season.)		
Season	Head coach	Conference	Overall				Conference					Conference	Postseason (Note: Postseason play involving the NCAA Division I Baseball Championship began in 1947.)	BA	CB	Coaches
Season	Head coach	Conference	Wins	Losses	Ties	%	Wins	Losses	Ties	%	Finish	Conference	Postseason	BA	CB	Coaches
Rice Owls
1913	Philip Arbuckle	Independent	3	3	0	.500	—	—	—	—	—	—	—	—	—	—
1914	Philip Arbuckle	Southwest Conference	8	8	1	.500	1	2	1	.333		—	—	—	—	—
1915	Philip Arbuckle	Southwest Conference	5	13	0	.278	3	11	0	.214		—	—	—	—	—
1916	Philip Arbuckle	Southwest Conference	?	?	?	?	2	9	0	.182		—	—	—	—	—
1917	Philip Arbuckle	Southwest Conference	8	5	1	.615	3	4	1	.429		—	—	—	—	—
1918	Jack Coombs	Southwest Conference	6	8	0	.429	0	2	0	.000		—	—	—	—	—
1919	Unknown	Southwest Conference	?	?	?	?	?	?	?	?		—	—	—	—	—
1920	Pete Cawthon	Southwest Conference	?	?	?	?	1	10	0	.091		—	—	—	—	—
1921	Pete Cawthon	Southwest Conference	3	9	0	.250	3	8	0	.273		—	—	—	—	—
1922	Bob Countryman	Southwest Conference	2	5	0	.286	1	5	0	.167		—	—	—	—	—
1923	Bob Countryman	Southwest Conference	4	9	0	.308	3	7	0	.300		—	—	—	—	—
1924	Mike O'Neill	Southwest Conference	4	12	0	.250	3	11	0	.214		—	—	—	—	—
1925	Joe Bedenk	Southwest Conference	?	?	?	?	6	6	0	.500		—	—	—	—	—
1926	Joe Bedenk	Southwest Conference	?	?	?	?	5	6	0	.455		—	—	—	—	—
1927	Dickey Kerr	Southwest Conference	?	?	?	?	6	14	0	.300		—	—	—	—	—
1928	Dickey Kerr/Charley Schwartz	Southwest Conference	?	?	?	?	6	14	0	.300		—	—	—	—	—
1929	Gene Bailey	Southwest Conference	9	15	0	.375	7	13	0	.350		—	—	—	—	—
1930	Danny Allnoch	Southwest Conference	6	12	0	.333	5	13	0	.277		—	—	—	—	—
1931	John Neimic	Southwest Conference	4	8	0	.333	5	13	0	.277		—	—	—	—	—
1932	John Neimic	Southwest Conference	9	9	0	.500	9	5	0	.643		—	—	—	—	—
1933	Did not play – Great Depression															
1934	Did not play – Great Depression															
1935	Did not play – Great Depression															
1936	Cecil Grigg	Southwest Conference	9	15	2	.385	5	9	0	.357		—	—	—	—	—
1937	Cecil Grigg	Southwest Conference	3	12	0	.200	3	12	0	.200		—	—	—	—	—
1938	Cecil Grigg	Southwest Conference	10	17	0	.370	1	14	0	.067		—	—	—	—	—
1939	Cecil Grigg	Southwest Conference	7	18	1	.288	4	11	0	.267		—	—	—	—	—
1940	Cecil Grigg	Southwest Conference	3	15	0	.167	3	11	0	.214		—	—	—	—	—
1941	Cecil Grigg	Southwest Conference	7	8	0	.467	5	8	0	.385		—	—	—	—	—
1942	Cecil Grigg	Southwest Conference	5	10	1	.344	5	9	0	.357		—	—	—	—	—
1943	Cecil Grigg	Southwest Conference	2	13	0	.133	0	8	0	.000		—	—	—	—	—
1944	Cecil Grigg	Southwest Conference	2	10	0	.167	Did not play – World War II				—	—	—	—	—	—
1945	Jess Neely	Southwest Conference	7	6	1	.536	6	5	0	.545		—	—	—	—	—
1946	Cecil Grigg	Southwest Conference	7	10	1	.417	6	9	0	.400		—	—	—	—	—
1947	Cecil Grigg	Southwest Conference	5	11	0	.313	4	10	0	.286		—	—	—	—	—
1948	Jess Neely	Southwest Conference	6	20	0	.231	3	11	0	.214		—	—	—	—	—
1949	Harold Stockbridge	Southwest Conference	4	14	0	.222	3	11	0	.214		—	—	—	—	—
1950	Harold Stockbridge	Southwest Conference	9	12	0	.429	2	11	0	.154		—	—	—	—	—
1951	Harold Stockbridge	Southwest Conference	8	13	0	.381	3	12	0	.200		—	—	—	—	—
1952	Harold Stockbridge	Southwest Conference	12	12	0	.480	5	10	0	.333		—	—	—	—	—
1953	Dell Morgan	Southwest Conference	5	16	0	.231	3	11	0	.214		—	—	—	—	—
1954	Dell Morgan	Southwest Conference	5	19	0	.208	2	12	0	.143		—	—	—	—	—
1955	Dell Morgan	Southwest Conference	8	15	0	.348	5	10	0	.333		—	—	—	—	—
1956	Dell Morgan	Southwest Conference	11	13	0	.458	6	9	0	.400		—	—	—	—	—
1957	Dell Morgan	Southwest Conference	9	12	0	.429	5	10	0	.333		—	—	—	—	—
1958	Dell Morgan	Southwest Conference	12	9	1	.568	8	6	0	.571		—	—	—	—	—
1959	Dell Morgan	Southwest Conference	14	10	0	.583	7	7	0	.500		—	—	—		—
1960	Dell Morgan	Southwest Conference	17	8	0	.680	10	5	0	.667		—	—	—		—
1961	Dell Morgan	Southwest Conference	13	11	0	.542	6	6	0	.500		—	—	—		—
1962	Joe Gallagher	Southwest Conference	10	12	0	.455	4	9	0	.308		—	—	—		—
1963	Doug Osburn	Southwest Conference	9	17	0	.346	2	11	0	.154		—	—	—		—
1964	Doug Osburn	Southwest Conference	7	17	0	.292	3	12	0	.200		—	—	—		—
1965	Doug Osburn	Southwest Conference	10	15	0	.400	5	10	0	.333		—	—	—		—
1966	Doug Osburn	Southwest Conference	14	11	0	.560	5	10	0	.333		—	—	—		—
1967	Doug Osburn	Southwest Conference	17	10	0	.630	5	10	0	.333		—	—	—		—
1968	Doug Osburn	Southwest Conference	10	15	0	.400	6	12	0	.333		—	—	—		—
1969	Doug Osburn	Southwest Conference	14	11	0	.560	7	6	0	.538		—	—	—		—
1970	Doug Osburn	Southwest Conference	18	11	0	.621	10	7	0	.588		—	—	—		—
1971	Doug Osburn	Southwest Conference	9	20	0	.310	3	14	0	.176		—	—	—		—
1972	Doug Osburn	Southwest Conference	19	12	0	.613	11	7	0	.611		—	—	—		—
1973	Doug Osburn	Southwest Conference	16	14	0	.533	6	10	0	.375		—	—	—		—
1974	Doug Osburn	Southwest Conference	24	18	0	.571	12	11	0	.523		—	—	—		—
1975	Doug Osburn	Southwest Conference	19	16	0	.543	11	13	0	.458		—	—	—		—
1976	Doug Osburn	Southwest Conference	17	22	0	.436	10	14	0	.417		—	—	—		—
1977	Doug Osburn	Southwest Conference	15	26	0	.366	7	15	0	.318			—	—		—
1978	Doug Osburn	Southwest Conference	18	29	0	.383	6	18	0	.250			—	—		—
1979	Doug Osburn	Southwest Conference	20	29	0	.408	5	19	0	.208			—	—		—
1980	Doug Osburn	Southwest Conference	14	29	0	.326	8	16	0	.333			—	—		—
1981	David Hall	Southwest Conference	34	23	0	.596	11	10	0	.524			—			—
1982	David Hall	Southwest Conference	34	23	0	.596	8	13	0	.381			—			—
1983	David Hall	Southwest Conference	36	16	0	.692	11	10	0	.524			—			—
1984	David Hall	Southwest Conference	41	14	0	.745	13	8	0	.619			—		19	—
1985	David Hall	Southwest Conference	27	21	0	.563	5	15	0	.250			—			—
1986	David Hall	Southwest Conference	34	26	0	.567	5	16	0	.238			—			—
1987	David Hall	Southwest Conference	23	23	0	.511	5	16	0	.238			—			—
1988	David Hall	Southwest Conference	31	28	0	.525	6	15	0	.286			—			—
1989	David Hall	Southwest Conference	28	30	0	.483	4	17	0	.190			—			—
1990	David Hall	Southwest Conference	33	29	0	.532	11	9	0	.550			—			—
1991	David Hall	Southwest Conference	16	34	0	.320	6	15	0	.286			—			—
1992	Wayne Graham	Southwest Conference	29	26	0	.527	15	21	0	.416			—			
1993	Wayne Graham	Southwest Conference	36	18	0	.667	7	11	0	.389	5th		—			
1994	Wayne Graham	Southwest Conference	34	21	0	.618	12	6	0	.667	T-2nd	3rd	—			
1995	Wayne Graham	Southwest Conference	43	19	0	.694	15	9	0	.625	T-2nd	4th	South Regional	12	15	12
1996	Wayne Graham	Southwest Conference	42	23	0	.646	6	15	0	.286	T-6th	1st	Midwest Regional	17	25	15
1997	Wayne Graham	Western Athletic Conference	47	16	0	.746	20	9	0	.690	1st	1st	College World Series	8	7	8
1998	Wayne Graham	Western Athletic Conference	46	17	0	.730	26	4	0	.867	1st		Central Regional	15	17	15
1999	Wayne Graham	Western Athletic Conference	59	15	0	.797	25	5	0	.833	1st	1st	College World Series	5	5	5
2000	Wayne Graham	Western Athletic Conference	43	23	0	.652	19	11	0	.633	1st		Houston Regional	—	—	—
2001	Wayne Graham	Western Athletic Conference	47	20	0	.701	26	10	0	.722	1st		Lincoln Super Regional	13	16	12
2002	Wayne Graham	Western Athletic Conference	52	14	0	.788	28	2	0	.933	1st		College World Series	5	7	6
2003	Wayne Graham	Western Athletic Conference	58	12	0	.829	25	5	0	.833	1st		National champions	1	1	1
2004	Wayne Graham	Western Athletic Conference	46	14	0	.767	24	6	0	.800	1st		Houston Regional	11	10	11
2005	Wayne Graham	Western Athletic Conference	45	19	0	.703	21	9	0	.700	1st		New Orleans Super Regional	13	16	13
2006	Wayne Graham	Conference USA	57	13	0	.814	22	2	0	.919	1st	1st	College World Series	4	3	3
2007	Wayne Graham	Conference USA	56	14	0	.800	22	2	0	.919	1st	1st	College World Series	3	3	3
2008	Wayne Graham	Conference USA	47	15	0	.758	21	3	0	.875	1st	First round	College World Series	8	8	7
2009	Wayne Graham	Conference USA	43	18	0	.705	16	8	0	.667	4th	1st	Baton Rouge Super Regional	6	7	7
2010	Wayne Graham	Conference USA	40	23	0	.635	17	7	0	.708	1st	2nd	Austin Regional			
2011	Wayne Graham	Conference USA	42	21	0	.667	16	8	0	.667	1st	1st	Houston Regional			
2012	Wayne Graham	Conference USA	40	17	0	.702	17	7	0	.708	1st	Division A	Houston Regional			
2013	Wayne Graham	Conference USA	44	20	0	.688	15	9	0	.625	1st	1st	Raleigh Super Regional			
2014	Wayne Graham	Conference USA	41	18	0	.695	23	7	0	.767	1st	1st	Houston Regional			
2015	Wayne Graham	Conference USA	35	18	0	.660	22	8	0	.733	1st	First round	Houston Regional			
2016	Wayne Graham	Conference USA	38	24	0	.613	19	10	0	.655	4th	2nd	Baton Rouge Regional			
2017	Wayne Graham	Conference USA	33	31	0	.516	16	14	0	.533	6th	1st	Houston Regional			
2018	Wayne Graham	Conference USA	23	28	0	.451	11	14	0	.440	7th	Semifinals	—			
2019	Matt Bragga	Conference USA	26	33	0	.441	14	16	0	.467	7th	Semifinals	—			
2020	Matt Bragga	Conference USA	2	14	0	.125	0	0	0	–	—	—	—			
2021	Matt Bragga	Conference USA	23	29	1	.443	11	20	1	.359	10th	—	—	—	—	—
2022	José Cruz Jr.	Conference USA	17	39	0	.304	9	21	0	.300	9th	—	—	—	—	—
2023	José Cruz Jr.	Conference USA	21	37	0	.362	9	21	0	.300	8th	—	—	—	—	—
2024	José Cruz Jr.	American	23	36	0	.390	11	16	0	.407	8th	Second round	—	—	—	—
2025	José Cruz Jr. / David Pierce	American	17	40	0	.298	10	17	0	.370	8th	First round	—	—	—	—
Total			W	L	T	%	Championships									
All-Time record			2183	1791	10	.549										
Conference record			960	1091	3	.468	18 Conference Championships; 11 Tournament championships									
College World Series record			10	13	0	.435	1 National Championship; 7 CWS Appearances; 23 NCAA tournament Appearances									
