= Jason Marshall (baseball) =

Biographical details
- Born: June 27, 1970 (age 56)

Playing career
- 1989–1992: Texas A&M
- 1992–1995: Kansas City Royals farm system
- Position: Shortstop

Coaching career (HC unless noted)
- 1996–1997: Texas A&M (Asst.)
- 1998–2000: McMurry (Asst.)
- 2001–2012: UTSA (Asst.)
- 2013–2019: UTSA

Head coaching record
- Overall: 208–189
- Tournaments: WAC: 4–0; CUSA: 8–10; NCAA: 0–2

Accomplishments and honors

Championships
- WAC tournament (2013)

Jason David Marshall (born June 27, 1970) in an American college baseball coach and former shortstop. Marshall played college baseball at Texas A&M University from 1989 to 1992 for coach Mark Johnson. He was then drafted in the 13th round by the Kansas City Royals, where he played in their organization from 1992 to 1995. Marshall was the head baseball coach at the University of Texas at San Antonio from 2013 to 2019.

== Playing career ==
Marshall played at Texas A&M as a shortstop from 1989 through 1992. In his senior season, he was named Aggies Most Valuable Player after leading the team in hits, runs, RBI, and games played. He was drafted in the 13th round of the 1992 MLB draft by the Kansas City Royals and played four seasons in the Royals system.

== Coaching career ==
After ending his playing career, Marshall served as an assistant at Texas A&M for two seasons. While there, he also served as an assistant coach of the Cotuit Kettleers of the Cape Cod Baseball League in 1997. He then moved to McMurry for three years before earning an assistant position at UTSA. He added associate head coach duties after three years, and also served as recruiting coordinator and infielders coach. He was elevated to the head coaching position on June 18, 2012. Marshall guided the Roadrunners a berth in the 2013 NCAA Division I baseball tournament by winning the 2013 Western Athletic Conference baseball tournament, but failed to return to the postseason ever again. He resigned on May 27, 2019. Marshall was 208–189 as the head coach at UTSA.

== Head coaching record ==
The following lists Marshall's record as a head coach at the Division I level.

Record table
Season	Team	Overall	Conference	Standing	Postseason
UTSA Roadrunners (Western Athletic Conference) (2013)
2013	UTSA	35–25	15–11	4th	NCAA Regional
UTSA Roadrunners (Conference USA) (2014–2019)
2014	UTSA	35–25	16–14	T-6th	C-USA tournament
2015	UTSA	32–23	17–13	5th	C-USA tournament
2016	UTSA	17–34	8–20	11th	
2017	UTSA	29–28	15–15	T-7th	C-USA tournament
2018	UTSA	32–24	16–13	5th	C-USA tournament
2019	UTSA	28–30	13–16	8th	C-USA tournament
UTSA:		208–189	100–102		
Total:		208–189			
National champion Postseason invitational champion Conference regular season champion Conference regular season and conference tournament champion Division regular season champion Division regular season and conference tournament champion Conference tournament champion
