= Lane Burroughs =

Baseball coach

Current position
- Title: Head coach
- Team: Louisiana Tech
- Conference: Sun Belt
- Record: 310–186

Biographical details
- Born: Meridian, Mississippi, U.S.

Playing career
- 1992–1993: Meridian CC
- 1994–1995: Mississippi College

Coaching career (HC unless noted)
- 1996: Mississippi College (assistant)
- 1997: East Mississippi CC (assistant)
- 1998: Northwestern State (assistant)
- 1999–2007: Southern Miss (assistant)
- 2008: Kansas State (assistant)
- 2009–2012: Mississippi State (assistant)
- 2013–2016: Northwestern State
- 2017–present: Louisiana Tech

Head coaching record
- Overall: 423–299
- Tournaments: 3–6 (NCAA Division I)

Accomplishments and honors

Championships
- C-USA tournament (2022); C-USA West Division (2021); C-USA regular season (2024)

Awards
- C-USA Coach of the Year: (2024)

Lane Burroughs is an American college baseball coach, currently serving as head coach of the Louisiana Tech Bulldogs baseball program. He was previously the head coach at Northwestern State, named to that position prior to the 2013 season.

Burroughs played for two seasons at Meridian Community College while earning an associate degree, then completed his eligibility and bachelor's at Mississippi College. While completing a master's degree at Mississippi College, he served as a graduate assistant coach with the Choctaws, then served for one season at East Mississippi Community College and one season at Northwestern State as an assistant coach. Burroughs then worked for eight years at Southern Miss, where he helped lead the Golden Eagles to six NCAA Regional appearances. He served in a variety of roles: third base coach, hitting coach, infielders coach, and recruiting coordinator. He then moved to Kansas State for one season, during which the Wildcats reached the 2008 Big 12 Tournament final. Burroughs accepted an assistant coaching position at Mississippi State, where he remained for four seasons before being named to his first head coaching position at Northwestern State in June 2012.

== Head coaching record ==
Record table
Season	Team	Overall	Conference	Standing	Postseason
Northwestern State Demons (Southland Conference) (2013–2016)
2013	Northwestern State	16–40	5–22	10th	
2014	Northwestern State	33–26	19–11	T–3rd	Southland tournament
2015	Northwestern State	31–23	20–8	2nd	Southland tournament
2016	Northwestern State	33–24	20–10	T–3rd	Southland tournament
Northwestern State:		113–113 (.500)	64–51 (.557)		
Louisiana Tech Bulldogs (Conference USA) (2017–present)
2017	Louisiana Tech	36–20	17–13	5th	C-USA tournament
2018	Louisiana Tech	39–20	21–9	2nd	C-USA tournament
2019	Louisiana Tech	34–24	17–13	3rd	C-USA tournament
2020	Louisiana Tech	11–6	0–0		Season canceled due to COVID-19
2021	Louisiana Tech	42–20	22–8	1st (West)	NCAA Regional
2022	Louisiana Tech	43–21	20–10	2nd	NCAA Regional
2023	Louisiana Tech	28–31	15–15	6th	C-USA tournament
2024	Louisiana Tech	45–19	18–6	1st	NCAA Regional
2025	Louisiana Tech	32–25	14–12	5th	C-USA tournament
Louisiana Tech:		310–186 (.625)	144–86 (.626)		
Total:		423–299 (.586)			
National champion Postseason invitational champion Conference regular season champion Conference regular season and conference tournament champion Division regular season champion Division regular season and conference tournament champion Conference tournament champion

== See also ==
- List of current NCAA Division I baseball coaches
