= 2020 Louisiana Tech Bulldogs baseball team =

American college baseball season

2020 Louisiana Tech Bulldogs baseball
- Conference: Conference USA
- Record: 11–6 (0–0 C-USA)
- Head coach: Lane Burroughs (4th season)
- Assistant coaches: Mike Silva; Mitch Gaspard; Matt Miller
- Home stadium: Ruston High School Baseball Stadium

2020 Conference USA baseball standings
	Conf.						Overall
Team	W		L		T	PCT	W		L		T	PCT
Old Dominion ‍‍‍	0	–	0	–	0	–	12	–	4	–	0	.750
Southern Miss ‍‍‍	0	–	0	–	0	–	12	–	4	–	0	.750
FIU ‍‍‍	0	–	0	–	0	–	10	–	5	–	0	.667
Louisiana Tech ‍‍‍	0	–	0	–	0	–	11	–	6	–	0	.647
Florida Atlantic ‍‍‍	0	–	0	–	0	–	10	–	6	–	0	.625
Western Kentucky ‍‍‍	0	–	0	–	0	–	10	–	6	–	0	.625
UTSA ‍‍‍	0	–	0	–	0	–	10	–	7	–	0	.588
Charlotte ‍‍‍	0	–	0	–	0	–	9	–	8	–	0	.529
UAB ‍‍‍	0	–	0	–	0	–	7	–	9	–	0	.438
Middle Tennessee ‍‍‍	0	–	0	–	0	–	7	–	10	–	0	.412
Marshall ‍‍‍	0	–	0	–	0	–	4	–	10	–	1	.300
Rice ‍‍‍	0	–	0	–	0	–	2	–	14	–	0	.125
x – Division champion † – Conference champion ‡ – Tournament champion y – Invited to the NCAA tournament As of March 16, 2020; Rankings from D1Baseball

The 2020 Louisiana Tech Bulldogs baseball team represent Louisiana Tech University in the 2020 NCAA Division I baseball season. The Bulldogs play their home games at Ruston High's Baseball Stadium and are led by fourth year head coach Lane Burroughs.

On March 12, the Conference USA released an announcement proclaiming the suspension of all spring athletics until "further notice". This came during the COVID-19 pandemic.

== Previous season ==
The Bulldogs finished 34–24 overall, and 17–13 in the conference. The Bulldogs lost their only two games in the C-USA Postseason tournament and were not invited to any other tournament, thus ending their season.

== Preseason ==
=== C-USA Coaches poll ===
The C-USA coaches poll was released on January 29, 2020 with the Bulldogs predicted to finish third in the conference.

Media poll
Predicted finish	Team	First Place votes
1	Southern Miss	6
2	Florida Atlantic	4
3	Louisiana Tech	
4	Old Dominion	
5	Rice	1
6	FIU	1
7	Western Kentucky	
8	UAB	
9	UTSA	
10	Marshall	
11	Charlotte	
12	Middle Tennessee	

=== Preseason All-C-USA teams ===
All-Team

- Taylor Young – JR, Infielder

== Roster ==
2020 Louisiana Tech Bulldogs roster
Pitchers: 6 Kyle Griffen – Senior; 13 Tyler Follis – Senior; 14 Casey Ouellette – Freshman; 15 Shemar Page – Junior; 16 Ryan Jennings – Junior; 20 Cade Gibson – Redshirt Junior; 21 Joseph Carbone – Freshman; 25 Jarret Whorff – Junior; 28 Jason Jaekel – Junior; 29 Bryson Bales – Freshman; 31 Jack Payne – Freshman; 33 Beau Billings – Sophomore; 36 Greg Martinez – Freshman; 37 Bryce Fagan – Redshirt Senior; 40 Seth Traweek – Freshman; 47 Jonathan Fincher – Redshirt Sophomore; Catchers: 11 Jorge Corona – Freshman; 12 Philip Matulia – Sophomore; 19 Jackson Slaughter – Freshman; 38 Kyle Hasler – Freshman	Outfielders: 1 Manny Garcia – Senior; 2 Parker Bates – Senior; 4 Cole McConnell – Freshman; 5 Braden Duhon – Freshman; 7 Adarius Myers – Redshirt Freshman; 17 Seth White – Redshirt Junior; 18 Bryce Wallace – Sophomore; 30 Steele Netterville – Junior; Infielders: 3 Alex Ray – Junior; 8 Taylor Young – Junior; 9 Hunter Wells – Redshirt Senior; 10 Logan McLeod – Freshman; 26 Kyle Crigger – Junior; 39 Ben Brantley – Freshman

=== Coaching staff ===
2020 Louisiana Tech Bulldogs coaching staff
- Lane Burroughs – Head Coach – 4th year
- Mike Silva – Associate head coach – 3rd year
- Mitch Gaspard – Assistant Head Coach/recruiting coordinator – 1st year
- Matt Miller – Assistant Coach – 1st year
- Kim Tanner – Administrative Assistant
- Katie Lunsford – Athletic Trainer
- Alexa Garcia – Director of player development
- Brian Walker – Assistant Strength and Conditioning Coach
- Kent Hasler – Graduate Manager
- Spence Drake – Student Manager
- Joe Craighead – Student Manager

== Schedule and results ==
2020 Louisiana Tech Bulldogs baseball game log
Regular season (11-6)

February (8–3)
Date	Opponent	Rank	Site/stadium	Score	Win	Loss	Save	TV	Attendance	Overall record	C-USA record
Feb. 15	at No. 24 Louisiana		M. L. Tigue Moore Field at Russo Park; Lafayette, LA	**W** 2–1	**Fincher** (1–0)	Moriarty (0–1)	**Crigger** (1)		5,109	1–0	
Feb. 15	vs. Southeastern Louisiana		M. L. Tigue Moore Field at Russo Park	**W** 2–0	**Griffen** (1–0)	Simanek (0–1)	**Billings** (1)		457	2–0	
Feb. 16	at No. 24 Louisiana		M. L. Tigue Moore Field at Russo Park	**W** 10–0	**Whorff** (1-0)	Schultz (0-1)	None		4,881	3–0	
Feb. 18	at McNeese State		Joe Miller Ballpark; Lake Charles, LA	**W** 7–4	**Martinez** (1–0)	Hecker (0–1)	**Griffen** (1)		1,215	4–0	
Feb. 21	at Troy		Riddle–Pace Field; Troy, AL	**L** 0–4	Thomas (2–0)	**Fincher** (1–1)	Johnson (1)		1,399	4–1	
Feb. 22	at Troy		Riddle–Pace Field	**L** 4–7	Oates (2-0)	**Crigger** (0–1)	Wilkinson (1)		2,053	4–2	
Feb. 23	at Troy		Riddle–Pace Field	**W** 9–0	**Whorff** (2-0)	Newton (1–1)	None		1,567	5–2	
Feb. 26	at No. 11 LSU		Alex Box Stadium, Skip Bertman Field; Baton Rouge, LA	**L** 1–7	Kaminer (1-0)	**Martinez** (1-1)	None	SECN+	9,912	5–3	
Feb. 28	Maine		Ruston High Baseball Stadium; Ruston, LA	**W** 5–1	**Fincher** (2–1)	Sinacola (0–3)	None		842	6–3	
Feb. 29	Maine		Ruston High Baseball Stadium	**W** 15–10	**Page** (1–0)	Pushard (0–2)	None		1,056	7–3	
Feb. 29	Maine		Ruston High Baseball Stadium	**W** 19–0	**Traweek** (1–0)	Carson (0–2)		1,056	8–3		

March (3–3)
Date	Opponent	Rank	Site/stadium	Score	Win	Loss	Save	TV	Attendance	Overall record	SEC record
Mar. 1	Maine		Ruston High Baseball Stadium	**W** 26–3	**Whorff** (3–0)	Geoffrion (0-1)	None		734	9–3	
Mar. 3	at Sam Houston State		Don Sanders Stadium; Huntsville, TX	**W** 9–3	**Ouelette** (1–0)	Wesneski (0–1)	None	ESPN+	1,175	10–3	
Mar. 4	at Sam Houston State		Don Sanders Stadium	Game canceled							
Mar. 6	at Wichita State		Eck Stadium; Wichita, KS	**L** 2–6	Hamilton (2–1)	**Fincher** (2–2)	None		1,845	10–4	
Mar. 7	at Wichita State		Eck Stadium	**L** 3–5	Bechtel (2–0)	**Griffen** (1–1)	Gifford (4)		2,113	10–5	
Mar. 8	at Wichita State		Eck Stadium	**L** 9–10	Peters (1-0)	**Ouelette** (1-1)	None		1,996	10–6	
Mar. 10	Southeastern Louisiana		Ruston High Baseball Stadium	**W** 14–3	**Crigger** (1–1)	Bozosi (0–1)	None'		785	11-7	
Mar. 13	vs. Middle Tennessee		Smith–Wills Stadium; Jackson, MS	Games suspended indefinitely							
Mar. 14	vs. Middle Tennessee		Smith–Wills Stadium	Games suspended indefinitely							
Mar. 15	vs. Middle Tennessee		Smith–Wills Stadium	Games suspended indefinitely							
Mar. 17	at Northwestern State		H. Alvin Brown–C. C. Stroud Field; Natchitoches, LA	Games suspended indefinitely							
Mar. 20	at Western Kentucky		Nick Denes Field; Bowling Green, KY	Games suspended indefinitely							
Mar. 21	at Western Kentucky		Nick Denes Field	Games suspended indefinitely							
Mar. 22	at Western Kentucky		Nick Denes Field	Games suspended indefinitely							
Mar. 24	at Louisiana		M. L. Tigue Moore Field at Russo Park	Games suspended indefinitely							
Mar. 27	vs. Florida Atlantic		Warhawk Field; Monroe, LA	Games suspended indefinitely							
Mar. 28	vs. Florida Atlantic		Warhawk Field	Games suspended indefinitely							
Mar. 29	vs. Florida Atlantic		Warhawk Field	Games suspended indefinitely							
Mar. 31	at Southeastern Louisiana		Pat Kenelly Diamond at Alumni Field; Hammond, LA	Games suspended indefinitely							

April (0-0)
Date	Opponent	Rank	Site/stadium	Score	Win	Loss	Save	TV	Attendance	Overall record	SEC record
Apr. 3	at Marshall		Appalachian Power Park; Charleston, WV	Games suspended indefinitely							
Apr. 4	at Marshall		Appalachian Power Park	Games suspended indefinitely							
Apr. 5	at Marshall		Appalachian Power Park	Games suspended indefinitely							
Apr. 7	at Louisiana–Monroe		Warhawk Field	Games suspended indefinitely							
Apr. 9	vs. Rice		Smith–Wills Stadium	Games suspended indefinitely							
Apr. 10	vs. Rice		Smith–Wills Stadium	Games suspended indefinitely							
Apr. 11	vs. Rice		Smith–Wills Stadium	Games suspended indefinitely							
Apr. 14	vs. Northwestern State		Ruston High Baseball Stadium	Games suspended indefinitely							
Apr. 17	at UTSA		Roadrunner Field; San Antonio, TX	Games suspended indefinitely							
Apr. 18	at UTSA		Roadrunner Field	Games suspended indefinitely							
Apr. 19	at UTSA		Roadrunner Field	Games suspended indefinitely							
Apr. 21	vs. McNeese State		Ruston High Baseball Stadium	Games suspended indefinitely							
Apr. 24	vs. Old Dominion		Smith–Wills Stadium	Games suspended indefinitely							
Apr. 25	vs. Old Dominion		Smith–Wills Stadium	Games suspended indefinitely							
Apr. 26	vs. Old Dominion		Smith–Wills Stadium	Games suspended indefinitely							
Apr. 28	vs. Louisiana		Ruston High Baseball Stadium	Games suspended indefinitely							

May (0–0)
Date	Opponent	Rank	Site/stadium	Score	Win	Loss	Save	TV	Attendance	Overall record	SEC record
May 1	at UAB		Jerry D. Young Memorial Field; Birmingham, AL	Games suspended indefinitely							
at UAB		Jerry D. Young Memorial Field	Games suspended indefinitely								
May 3	at UAB		Jerry D. Young Memorial Field	Games suspended indefinitely							
May 8	at Southern Miss		Pete Taylor Park; Hattiesburg, MS	Games suspended indefinitely							
May 9	at Southern Miss		Pete Taylor Park	Games suspended indefinitely							
May 10	at Southern Miss		Pete Taylor Park	Games suspended indefinitely							
May 12	at Louisiana–Monroe		Warhawk Field	Games suspended indefinitely							
May 14	vs. FIU		Warhawk Field	Games suspended indefinitely							
May 15	vs. FIU		Warhawk Field	Games suspended indefinitely							
May 16	vs. FIU		Warhawk Field	Games suspended indefinitely							

Postseason

C-USA Tournament
Date	Opponent	Seed	Site/stadium	Score	Win	Loss	Save	TV	Attendance	Overall record	SECT Record
May 20–24	TBD		MGM Park; Biloxi, MS	Games suspended indefinitely							

Legend: = Win = Loss = Cancelled/Suspended
Bold = Louisiana Tech team member

Schedule source:

*Rankings are based on the team's current ranking in the D1Baseball poll.
