= Conference USA Tournament =

Conference USA Tournament or Conference USA Championship may refer to:

- Conference USA Football Championship, the football championship game
- Conference USA men's basketball tournament, the men's basketball championship tournament
- Conference USA women's basketball tournament, the women's basketball championship tournament
- Conference USA baseball tournament, the baseball championship tournament
