= Wayne Graham =

American baseball player and coach (1936–2024)

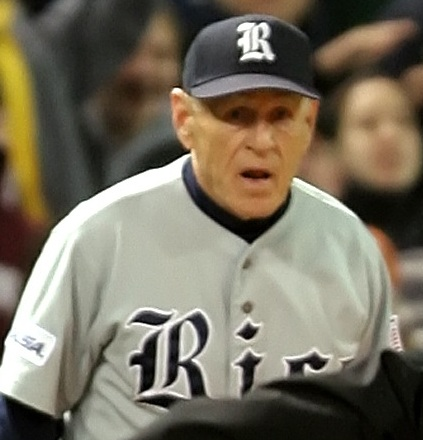
- Graham with Rice in 2006

Biographical details
- Born: April 6, 1936; Yoakum, Texas, U.S.
- Died: September 3, 2024 (aged 88); Austin, Texas, U.S.

Playing career
- 1956–1957: Texas
- Positions: Third base, outfield

Coaching career (HC unless noted)
- 1971–1979: Scarborough HS (TX)
- 1980: Spring Branch HS (TX)
- 1981–1991: San Jacinto College
- 1992–2018: Rice

Head coaching record
- Overall: 1,173–528–2 (.689) (college)

Accomplishments and honors

Championships
- College World Series (2003); 5 NJCAA World Series (1985–1987, 1989, 1990); SWC tournament (1996); 3 WAC tournament (1997–1999); 9 WAC regular season (1997–2005); 7 C-USA tournament (2006, 2007, 2009, 2011, 2013, 2014, 2017); 9 C-USA regular season (2006–2008, 2010–2015)

Awards
- Baseball America Coach of the Year (1999); 5x WAC Coach of the Year (1998, 1999, 2002, 2003, 2005); 5x C-USA Coach of the Year (2006–2008, 2010, 2012)
- College Baseball Hall of Fame; Inducted in 2012

Baseball career
- Third baseman
- Batted: Right Threw: Right

MLB debut
- April 10, 1963, for the Philadelphia Phillies

Last appearance
- October 4, 1964, for the New York Mets

MLB statistics
- Games played: 30
- Plate appearances: 58
- Batting average: .127
- Stats at Baseball Reference

Teams
- Philadelphia Phillies (1963); New York Mets (1964)

Wayne Leon Graham (April 6, 1936 – September 3, 2024) was an American college baseball head coach. He is known for being the head baseball coach for the Rice Owls in Houston, Texas. He coached one College World Series championship team and five NJCAA World Series championship teams. Also a former professional baseball player, Graham played in Major League Baseball (MLB) for the Philadelphia Phillies and New York Mets.

== Early life ==
Graham was born in Yoakum, Texas on April 3, 1936. His father, Earl, later moved the family to Houston for work, but also was employed as a Southwestern Conference umpire. Wayne was the batboy for the 1945 semi-pro Finger Furniture baseball team coached by his father.

== Playing career ==
Graham attended Reagan High School in Houston, winning a Texas state baseball championship in 1952. He subsequently played college baseball and studied engineering at the University of Texas, where he played two seasons under coach Bibb Falk. In order to earn money to support his wife and two children at the time, Wayne left school to pursue a professional baseball career.

Graham was signed by the Phillies as an amateur free agent in 1957. He played eleven years in pro ball, with the Phillies and Mets organizations. Graham was named Texas minor league player of the year in 1962 after hitting .311 for the Dallas-Fort Worth Rangers.

Graham received two brief MLB call-ups in the early 1960s. In early 1963, he was recalled by the Phillies, playing in ten games for manager Gene Mauch. Graham then appeared in twenty games for the 1964 New York Mets under the tutelage of legendary skipper Casey Stengel. He batted .127 in 55 at-bats in his short major league career.

== Coaching career ==
=== High school ===
When his playing career ended, Graham returned to the University of Texas to earn a Bachelor of Science degree in physical education in 1970, and he later added a master's degree in physical education at the University of Houston in 1973.

His coaching career began at Scarborough High School in Houston. Graham coached for nine seasons at Scarborough and one year at Spring Branch High School before moving on to coach junior college baseball at San Jacinto College in Houston.

=== San Jacinto ===
Beginning in 1981, Graham turned San Jacinto into one of the best junior college baseball teams in the country. After regular conference titles in Graham's first few seasons, the Gators became a dominant force in 1984 when they began a run of seven consecutive 50-win seasons and berths in the NJCAA World Series in Grand Junction, Colorado. After losing in the 1984 championship game, San Jacinto won three consecutive titles from 1985 to 1987. After falling short again in 1988 by taking second place, the Gators went back-to-back in 1989 and 1990. Those five national titles in six years eventually led to Graham being named Junior College Coach of the Century by Collegiate Baseball. In 1988, Graham skippered the Hyannis Mets, a collegiate summer baseball team in the Cape Cod Baseball League. In his 11 seasons at San Jacinto, Graham posted a 675–113 record (.856 win percentage), earned five national coach of the year awards, and produced multiple professional players, most notably pitchers Roger Clemens and Andy Pettitte.

=== Rice ===
Graham took over at Rice in 1992. He inherited a program that had tallied only seven winning seasons in 78 years of Southwest Conference play and had only finished above fourth place once. As at San Jacinto, he turned the program into a national powerhouse. A program that had never before qualified for the NCAA Division I baseball tournament made 23 consecutive tournament appearances (1995–2017) and won 20 consecutive regular-season or tournament conference championships (1996–2015) in three different conferences (Southwest Conference, Western Athletic Conference, and Conference USA). Rice has also been to the College World Series seven times (1997, 1999, 2002, 2003, 2006, 2007, and 2008). Graham's crowning achievement was the 2003 College World Series, in which Rice won its first national championship in any sport in its 91-year history. Not one to rest on his laurels, Graham quipped during a post-game interview, "We want to do it again." On April 16, 2016, Graham won his 1,100th Division I game (3–2 over Western Kentucky). He has more than 1,600 wins as a collegiate head coach. Graham was also largely responsible for Rice's on-campus baseball stadium, Reckling Park, being built in 2000.

In 2004, Graham once again presided over history, as three Rice pitchers were drafted in the first eight picks of the 2004 Major League Baseball draft, the only time three teammates have ever been selected in the first round. Graham's Rice teams produced first-round picks Jose Cruz, Jr. (1995), Matt Anderson (1997), Lance Berkman (1997), Bubba Crosby (1998), Kenny Baugh (2001), Jon Skaggs (2001), David Aardsma (2003), Philip Humber (2004), Jeff Niemann (2004), Wade Townsend (2004, 2005), Joe Savery (2007), and Anthony Rendon (2011). Eight of those players were pitchers, and Graham was known for developing players that went undrafted out of high school, such as Niemann and Townsend.

During the 2017 season, despite finishing in 6th place in Conference USA, Graham led Rice to their 23rd consecutive NCAA tournament. Needing to win the Conference USA tournament title to qualify for the NCAA tournament and to keep the streak alive, he led to Owls to the conference title. Rice won four consecutive games and rallied late in the championship to upset #11 nationally ranked Southern Miss 5–4 on a walk-off double. Graham never had a losing season as a high school or college coach until his final season at Rice in 2018. His contract was not extended after that season.

In 2012, Graham was inducted into the College Baseball Hall of Fame.

== Death ==
Graham died in Austin on September 3, 2024, at the age of 88.

== Head coaching record ==
=== College ===
Record table
Season	Team	Overall	Conference	Standing	Postseason
Rice Owls (Southwest Conference) (1992–1996)
1992	Rice	29–26	15–21	5th	
1993	Rice	36–18	7–11	5th	
1994	Rice	34–21	12–6	T–2nd	
1995	Rice	43–19	15–9	T–2nd	NCAA Regional
1996	Rice	42–23	9–15	t-6th	NCAA Regional
Rice Owls (Western Athletic Conference) (1997–2005)
1997	Rice	47–16	20–9	1st (South)	College World Series
1998	Rice	46–17	26–4	1st (South)	NCAA Regional
1999	Rice	59–15	25–5	1st	College World Series
2000	Rice	43–23	19–11	1st	NCAA Regional
2001	Rice	47–20	26–10	1st	NCAA Super Regional
2002	Rice	52–14	28–2	1st	College World Series
2003	Rice	58–12	25–5	1st	College World Series champions
2004	Rice	46–14	24–6	1st	NCAA Regional
2005	Rice	45–19	21–9	1st	NCAA Super Regional
Rice Owls (Conference USA) (2006–2018)
2006	Rice	57–13	22–2	1st	College World Series
2007	Rice	56–14	22–2	1st	College World Series
2008	Rice	47–15	21–3	1st	College World Series
2009	Rice	43–18	16–8	2nd	NCAA Super Regional
2010	Rice	40–23	17–7	1st	NCAA Regional
2011	Rice	42–21	16–8	T–1st	NCAA Regional
2012	Rice	41–19	17–7	1st	NCAA Regional
2013	Rice	44–20	15–9	1st	NCAA Super Regional
2014	Rice	42–20	23–7	1st	NCAA Regional
2015	Rice	37–22	22–8	1st	NCAA Regional
2016	Rice	38–24	19–10	4th	NCAA Regional
2017	Rice	33–31	16–14	6th	NCAA Regional
2018	Rice	26–31–2	11–15–2	7th	
Rice:		1,173–528–2	531–244–2		
Total:		1,173–528–2			
National champion Postseason invitational champion Conference regular season champion Conference regular season and conference tournament champion Division regular season champion Division regular season and conference tournament champion Conference tournament champion

== See also ==
- List of college baseball career coaching wins leaders
