= 2019 Louisiana Tech Bulldogs baseball team =

American college baseball season

2019 Louisiana Tech Bulldogs baseball
- Conference: Conference USA
- Record: 34–24 (17–13 C-USA)
- Head coach: Lane Burroughs (3rd season)
- Assistant coaches: Mike Silva; Austin Knight
- Home stadium: J. C. Love Field at Pat Patterson Park

2019 Conference USA baseball standings
	Conf.						Overall
Team	W		L		T	PCT	W		L		T	PCT
Florida Atlantic ‍†‍‍^{y}	22	–	8	–	0	.733	41	–	21	–	0	.661
Southern Miss ‍‍‡‍^{y}	20	–	10	–	0	.667	40	–	21	–	0	.656
Louisiana Tech ‍‍‍	17	–	13	–	0	.567	34	–	24	–	0	.586
Western Kentucky ‍‍‍	16	–	13	–	1	.550	26	–	29	–	1	.473
Old Dominion ‍‍‍	16	–	14	–	0	.533	35	–	21	–	0	.625
Marshall ‍‍‍	14	–	15	–	0	.483	29	–	28	–	0	.509
Rice ‍‍‍	14	–	16	–	0	.467	26	–	33	–	0	.441
UTSA ‍‍‍	13	–	16	–	0	.448	28	–	30	–	0	.483
UAB ‍‍‍	12	–	18	–	0	.400	27	–	29	–	0	.482
FIU ‍‍‍	12	–	18	–	0	.400	23	–	32	–	0	.418
Charlotte ‍‍‍	11	–	18	–	1	.383	21	–	31	–	1	.406
Middle Tennessee ‍‍‍	11	–	19	–	0	.367	18	–	37	–	0	.327
† – Conference champion ‡ – Tournament champion y – Invited to the NCAA tournament As of June 4, 2019; Rankings from D1Baseball

The 2019 Louisiana Tech Bulldogs baseball team represented Louisiana Tech University in the 2019 NCAA Division I baseball season. The Bulldogs played the majority of their home games at J. C. Love Field at Pat Patterson Park. One weekend series was played at the baseball field at Ruston High School due to the deadly tornados that struck Ruston in April. In early May, it was declared that the university was looking into building a new stadium for the baseball team and that they would likely never use J. C. Love Field at Pat Patterson Park again.

== Roster ==
2019 Louisiana Tech Bulldogs roster
Pitchers: 6 Kyle Griffen - Junior; 13 Tyler Follis - Junior; 16 Logan Robbins - Redshirt Senior; 22 Matt Miller - Redshirt Senior; 24 Braxton Smith - Redshirt Senior; 28 Quinton Logan - Senior; 29 Dane Kapande - Junior; 31 Logan Bailey - Senior; 33 Tanner Propst - Redshirt Sophomore; 36 David Leal - Senior; 37 Bryce Fagan - Redshirt Junior; 39 Beau Billings - Freshman; 39 Luke Honeycutt - Freshman; 47 Jonathan Fincher - Redshirt Freshman	Catchers: 12 Philip Matulia - Freshman; 14 Chris Clayton - Senior; 40 Tyler Kersh - Redshirt Freshman; Infielders: 1 Champ Artigues - Freshman; 4 Grant Jones - Redshirt Junior; 8 Taylor Young - Sophomore; 9 Hunter Wells - Redshirt Junior; 15 Blake Johnson - Junior; 25 Tanner Huddleston - Senior; 26 Graham Hackbarth - Senior; Outfielders: 2 Parker Bates - Junior; 3 Mason Robinson - Redshirt Senior; 5 Mason Mallard - Redshirt Senior; 7 Adarius Myers - Freshman; 11 Steele Netterville - Sophomore; 17 Seth White - Redshirt Sophomore; 18 Bryce Wallace - Freshman; 19 Manny Garcia - Junior; 20 Hudson Hopkins - Redshirt Junior; 21 Shelton Wallace - Senior

=== Coaching staff ===
2019 Louisiana Tech Bulldogs coaching staff
- Lane Burroughs – Head Coach – 3rd year
- Mike Silva – Associate head coach – 1st year
- Austin Knight – Assistant Coach – 2nd year
- Travis Creel – Hitting Coach/recruiting coordinator - 2nd year
- Katie Lunsford – Athletic Trainer
- Rance Terry – Sports Performance
- Kent Hasler – Graduate Manager
- Andrew Castille – Student Manager
- Noah Spillers – Student Manager

== Schedule ==
2019 Louisiana Tech Bulldogs Game Log
Regular season
February

#	Date	Opponent	Venue	Score	Overall record	C-USA record
1	February 15	at Southeastern Louisiana	Pat Kenelly Diamond at Alumni Field • Hammond, LA	W 13–8	1–0	
2	February 16	at Southeastern Louisiana	Pat Kenelly Diamond at Alumni Field • Hammond, LA	W 15–11	2–0	
3	February 17	at Southeastern Louisiana	Pat Kenelly Diamond at Alumni Field • Hammond, LA	W 12-8	3–0	
4	February 20	Louisiana	J. C. Love Field at Pat Patterson Park • Ruston, LA	W 3–2 (10 inn)	4–0	
5	February 23	Troy	J. C. Love Field at Pat Patterson Park • Ruston, LA	L 3–4	4–1	
6	February 24	Troy	J. C. Love Field at Pat Patterson Park • Ruston, LA	W 11–4	5–1	
7	February 24	Troy	J. C. Love Field at Pat Patterson Park • Ruston, LA	L 5-7	5-2	
8	February 26	at Little Rock	Gary Hogan Field • Little Rock, AR	W 5–3 (12 inn)	6–2	

March

#	Date	Opponent	Venue	Score	Overall record	C-USA record
9	March 1	Arkansas State	J. C. Love Field at Pat Patterson Park • Ruston, LA	W 9–4	7–2	
10	March 2	Arkansas State	J. C. Love Field at Pat Patterson Park • Ruston, LA	W 5–4	8–2	
11	March 2	Arkansas State	J. C. Love Field at Pat Patterson Park • Ruston, LA	W 8–6	9–2	
12	March 5	Northwestern State	J. C. Love Field at Pat Patterson Park • Ruston, LA	L 4-8	9–3	
13	March 8	at #10 Arkansas	Baum-Walker Stadium • Fayetteville, AR	L 2–4	9–4	
14	March 9	at #10 Arkansas	Baum-Walker Stadium • Fayetteville, AR	W 12–7	10–4	
15	March 10	at #10 Arkansas	Baum-Walker Stadium • Fayetteville, AR	L 0–11	10–5	
16	March 12	Sam Houston State	J. C. Love Field at Pat Patterson Park • Ruston, LA	W 7-0	11–5	
17	March 13	Sam Houston State	J. C. Love Field at Pat Patterson Park • Ruston, LA	Game canceled		
18	March 15	Southern Miss	J. C. Love Field at Pat Patterson Park • Ruston, LA	L 9–12	11–6	0-1
19	March 16	Southern Miss	J. C. Love Field at Pat Patterson Park • Ruston, LA	L 1-5	11-7	0-2
20	March 27	Southern Miss	J. C. Love Field at Pat Patterson Park • Ruston, LA	L 5-10	11–8	0-3
21	March 19	Mississippi Valley State	J. C. Love Field at Pat Patterson Park • Ruston, LA	W 21-1	12–8	
22	March 22	at Middle Tennessee	Reese Smith Jr. Field • Murfreesboro, TN	W 5-1	13–8	1-3
23	March 23	at Middle Tennessee	Reese Smith Jr. Field • Murfreesboro, TN	L 1-4	13–9	1-4
24	March 24	at Middle Tennessee	Reese Smith Jr. Field • Murfreesboro, TN	W 10-5	14–9	2-4
25	March 26	Louisiana-Monroe	J. C. Love Field at Pat Patterson Park • Ruston, LA	L 4–9	14–10	
26	March 29	UAB	J. C. Love Field at Pat Patterson Park • Ruston, LA	W 3–2	15–10	3-4
27	March 30	UAB	J. C. Love Field at Pat Patterson Park • Ruston, LA	W 7–6	16–10	4-4
28	March 31	UAB	J. C. Love Field at Pat Patterson Park • Ruston, LA	W 5–2	17–10	5-4

April

#	Date	Opponent	Venue	Score	Overall record	C-USA record
29	April 3	McNeese State	J. C. Love Field at Pat Patterson Park • Ruston, LA	W 10-4	18–10	
30	April 5	UTSA	J. C. Love Field at Pat Patterson Park • Ruston, LA	W 4–2	19–10	6–4
31	April 5	UTSA	J. C. Love Field at Pat Patterson Park • Ruston, LA	W 8–7	20–10	7–4
32	April 7	UTSA	J. C. Love Field at Pat Patterson Park • Ruston, LA	W 6–3	21–10	8–4
33	April 9	at Louisiana	M. L. Tigue Moore Field at Russo Park • Lafayette, LA	W 11-3	22-10	
34	April 12	at #24 Florida Atlantic	FAU Baseball Stadium • Boca Raton, FL	W 5–3	23–10	9–4
35	April 13	at #24 Florida Atlantic	FAU Baseball Stadium • Boca Raton, FL	W 2–1	24–10	10–4
36	April 14	at #24 Florida Atlantic	FAU Baseball Stadium • Boca Raton, FL	L 3–11	24–11	10–5
37	April 16	at Louisiana-Monroe	Warhawk Field • Monroe, LA	W 5–0	25–11	
38	April 18	Marshall	J. C. Love Field at Pat Patterson Park • Ruston, LA	L 3-7	25–12	10–6
39	April 19	Marshall	J. C. Love Field at Pat Patterson Park • Ruston, LA	W 19-6	26–12	11–6
40	April 20	Marshall	J. C. Love Field at Pat Patterson Park • Ruston, LA	W 11–1 (7 inn)	27–12	12-6
41	April 23	Little Rock	J. C. Love Field at Pat Patterson Park • Ruston, LA	W 5–4	28–12	
42	April 24	at McNeese State	Joe Miller Ballpark • Lake Charles, LA	L 3-5	28–13	
43	April 26	at Rice	Reckling Park • Houston, TX	L 1–3	28–14	12-7
44	April 27	at Rice	Reckling Park • Houston, TX	L 2–4	28–15	12-8
45	April 28	at Rice	Reckling Park • Houston, TX	L 2–3 (10 inn)	28–16	12-9
46	April 30	at Northwestern State	H. Alvin Brown-C. C. Stroud Field • Natchitoches, LA	L 1–3	28–17	

May

#	Date	Opponent	Venue	Score	Overall record	C-USA record
47	May 3	at Old Dominion	Bud Metheny Baseball Complex • Norfolk, VA	L 6–14	28–18	12-10
48	May 4	at Old Dominion	Bud Metheny Baseball Complex • Norfolk, VA	W 4-2	29–18	13-10
49	May 4	at Old Dominion	Bud Metheny Baseball Complex • Norfolk, VA	L 3–7	29–19	13-11
50	May 7	at #15 LSU	Alex Box Stadium, Skip Bertman Field • Baton Rouge, LA	W 12–1	30–19	
51	May 10	Western Kentucky	Ruston High School Baseball Field • Ruston, LA	L 4–5	30–20	13-12
52	May 12	Western Kentucky	Ruston High School Baseball Field • Ruston, LA	W 6-1 (7 inn)	31–20	14-12
53	May 12	Western Kentucky	Ruston High School Baseball Field • Ruston, LA	W 8–3 (7 inn)	32–20	15-12
54	May 14	at #5 Mississippi State	Dudy Noble Field, Polk–DeMent Stadium • Starkville, MS	L 3–9	32–21	
55	May 16	at FIU	Infinity Insurance Park • Miami, FL	W 3–0	33–21	16-12
56	May 17	at FIU	Infinity Insurance Park • Miami, FL	W 5–2	34–21	17-12
57	May 18	at FIU	Infinity Insurance Park • Miami, FL	L 4–5	34–22	17-13

Post-season
C-USA Tournament

#	Date	Opponent	Venue	Score	Overall record	C-USA record
58	May 22	vs. Marshall	MGM Park • Biloxi, MS	L 4–6 (12 inn)	34–23	
59	May 23	vs. Rice	MGM Park • Biloxi, MS	L 3-4	34-24	
