= Conference USA baseball tournament =

- Conference baseball championship
- Sport: Baseball
- Conference: Conference USA
- Number of teams: 9
- Format: Pool play
- Current stadium: Mickey Dunn Stadium
- Current location: Kennesaw, Georgia
- Played: 1996–present
- Last contest: 2026
- Current champion: Jacksonville State (1)
- Most championships: Rice (7)
- TV partner: ESPN+/CBS Sports Network
- Official website: ConferenceUSA.com Baseball

Host stadiums
- Mickey Dunn Stadium (2026); Liberty Baseball Stadium (2025); J. C. Love Field at Pat Patterson Park (2021, 2024); MGM Park (2017–19); Pete Taylor Park (1996, 2005, 2009, 2014–16, 2022); Reckling Park (2006, 2013, 2023); Trustmark Park (2011–12); Cougar Field (2004, 2010); Turchin Stadium (1997, 2003, 2008); Clark-LeClair Stadium (2007); Grainger Stadium (2002); Zephyr Field (1998, 2001); Florida Power Park (2000); USA Stadium (1999)

Host locations
- Kennesaw, GA (2026); Lynchburg, VA (2025); Ruston, LA (2021, 2024); Biloxi, MS (2017–19); Hattiesburg, MS (1996, 2005, 2009, 2014–16, 2022); Pearl, MS (2011–12); Houston, TX (2004, 2006, 2010, 2013, 2023); New Orleans, LA (1997–98, 2001, 2003, 2008); Greenville, NC (2007); Kinston, NC (2002); St. Petersburg, FL (2000); Millington, TN (1999)

The Conference USA baseball tournament is the conference championship tournament in baseball for Conference USA (C-USA). The winner of the tournament receives an automatic bid to the NCAA Division I baseball tournament. The tournament format, which has changed several times, currently consists of an eight-team double-elimination tournament format, in which the winners of two four-team brackets play in a single-game final. Rice, which has won the tournament seven times, is the most successful team in the tournament's history.

== History ==
The tournament was first held in 1996, the first season after Conference USA was formed from the merger of the Metro Conference and the Great Midwest Conference.

=== 1996–1999 ===
From 1996 to 1999, the tournament format consisted of an eight-team double-elimination tournament preceded by a single-game play-in round. The play-in round determined which of the lowest seeds (by regular season conference record) would qualify for the eight-team bracket. In 1996, when the league had nine baseball-sponsoring schools, the play-in round included the 8th and 9th seeds. When Houston joined from the Southwest Conference prior to the 1997 season, the play-in round featured the 7th–10th seeds. The eight-team double-elimination tournament consisted of two four-team double-elimination brackets, the winners of which met in a single-game final.

=== 2000–2009 ===
In the 2000 tournament, the play-in round was eliminated, and the top eight seeds qualified for the eight-team double-elimination tournament automatically. The eight-team bracket followed the same format as it had from 1996 to 1999.

=== 2010 ===
In 2010, the tournament format was changed from double-elimination to round robin. The top six regular season finishers qualified for the tournament field, which consisted of two three-team "pods." Pod 1 included the 1st, 4th, and 5th seeds, and Pod 2 included the 2nd, 3rd, and 6th seeds. Each team played three preliminary games, two against its podmates and one against a team from the opposite group. The cross-group games matched up the seeds as follows: 1st vs. 6th, 2nd vs. 5th, and 3rd vs. 4th. The winner of each round robin pod advanced to a single-game final.

=== 2011–2013 ===
In 2011, the round robin format was expanded to the top eight regular season finishers. The tournament field consisted of two four-team pods. Pod 1 included the 1st, 4th, 5th, and 8th seeds, and Pod 2 included the 2nd, 3rd, 6th, and 7th seeds. Each team played three preliminary games, one against each member of its pod. The winner of each pod advanced to a single game.

=== 2014–Present ===
Beginning in 2014, the format returned to the eight team double-elimination format used from 1996 through 2009.

== Champions ==
Year	Champion	Venue	Most Valuable Player
1996	Tulane	Pete Taylor Park • Hattiesburg, MS	Jason Fitzgerald (Tulane)
1997	Houston	Turchin Stadium • New Orleans, LA	Scottie Scott (Houston)
1998	Tulane	Zephyr Field • New Orleans, LA	Brian Hughes (Tulane)
1999	Tulane	USA Stadium • Millington, TN	Mickey McKee (Tulane)
2000	Houston	Florida Power Park • St. Petersburg, FL	Jarrod Bitter (Houston)
2001	Tulane	Zephyr Field • New Orleans, LA	Barth Melius (Tulane)
2002	East Carolina	Grainger Stadium • Kinston, NC	Darryl Lawhorn (East Carolina)
2003	Southern Miss	Turchin Stadium • New Orleans, LA	Clint King (Southern Miss)
2004	TCU	Cougar Field • Houston, TX	Austin Adams (TCU)
2005 (Note: TCU and Tulane were declared co-champions by Conference USA in 2005 due to a cancelled championship game during severe weather.)	TCU; Tulane	Pete Taylor Park • Hattiesburg, MS	Nathan Southard (Tulane)
2006	Rice	Reckling Park • Houston, TX	Joe Savery (Rice)
2007	Rice	Clark-LeClair Stadium • Greenville, NC	Aaron Luna (Rice)
2008	Houston	Turchin Stadium • New Orleans, LA	Bryan Pounds (Houston)
2009	Rice	Pete Taylor Park • Hattiesburg, MS	Anthony Rendon (Rice)
2010	Southern Miss	Cougar Field • Houston, TX	Scott Copeland (Southern Miss)
2011	Rice	Trustmark Park • Pearl, MS	Tyler Duffey (Rice)
2012	UAB	Trustmark Park • Pearl, MS	Michael Busby (UAB)
2013	Rice	Reckling Park • Houston, TX (Note: Trustmark Park opted out of its contract to host the tournament in 2013. Conference USA announced that it would be held at Reckling Park instead.)	Christian Stringer (Rice)
2014	Rice	Pete Taylor Park • Hattiesburg, MS	Michael Aquino (Rice)
2015	FIU	Pete Taylor Park • Hattiesburg, MS	Josh Anderson (FIU)
2016	Southern Miss	Pete Taylor Park • Hattiesburg, MS	Daniel Keating (Southern Miss)
2017	Rice	MGM Park • Biloxi, MS	Glenn Otto (Rice)
2018	Southern Miss	MGM Park • Biloxi, MS	Mason Strickland (Southern Miss)
2019	Southern Miss	MGM Park • Biloxi, MS	Matt Wallner (Southern Miss)
2020	Cancelled due to the coronavirus pandemic		
2021	Old Dominion	J. C. Love Field at Pat Patterson Park • Ruston, LA	Tommy Bell (Old Dominion)
2022	Louisiana Tech	Pete Taylor Park • Hattiesburg, MS	Taylor Young (Louisiana Tech)
2023	Charlotte	Reckling Park • Houston, TX	Cam Fisher (Charlotte)
2024	Dallas Baptist	J. C. Love Field at Pat Patterson Park • Ruston, LA	Alex Pendergast (Dallas Baptist)
2025	Western Kentucky	Liberty Baseball Stadium • Lynchburg, Virginia	Ethan Lizama (Western Kentucky)
2026	Jacksonville State	Mickey Dunn Stadium • Kennesaw, Georgia	Sam Richardson (Jacksonville State)

=== By school ===
End of the 2026 tournament, updated.

School	Appearances	W-L	Pct	Tourney Titles	Title Years
Rice	15	38–18	.679	7	2006, 2007, 2009, 2011, 2013, 2014, 2017
Tulane	17	39–23	.629	5	1996, 1998, 1999, 2001, 2005
Southern Miss	26	60–42	.588	5	2003, 2010, 2016, 2018, 2019
Houston	17	36–28	.563	3	1997, 2000, 2008
TCU	4	9–5	.643	2	2004, 2005
**Jacksonville State**	2	8–2	.800	1	2026
**Dallas Baptist**	4	10–5	.667	1	2024
**Western Kentucky**	6	11–9	.550	1	2025
Charlotte	13	22–23	.489	1	2023
**Louisiana Tech**	10	18–19	.486	1	2022
Old Dominion	7	11–12	.478	1	2021
East Carolina	13	20–22	.476	1	2002
**FIU**	7	7–12	.368	1	2015
UAB	18	19–33	.365	1	2012
**Missouri State**	1	2–1	.667		
Florida Atlantic	8	16–15	.516		
**Liberty**	3	5–5	.500		
South Florida	9	15–17	.469		
UTSA	8	11–13	.458		
Memphis	12	15–22	.405		
Marshall	6	8–12	.400		
**Sam Houston**	2	2–3	.400		
Saint Louis	5	6–10	.375		
Cincinnati	6	5–9	.357		
**Kennesaw State**	2	2–4	.333		
UCF	6	5–11	.313		
**Middle Tennessee**	7	6–14	.300		
Louisville	10	8–19	.296		
**New Mexico State**	2	0–4	.000		

- **Bold** indicate school currently sponsors baseball in Conference USA.
- Italics indicate school no longer sponsors baseball in Conference USA.
