= Biloxi Stadium =

Former Ballpark in Mississippi

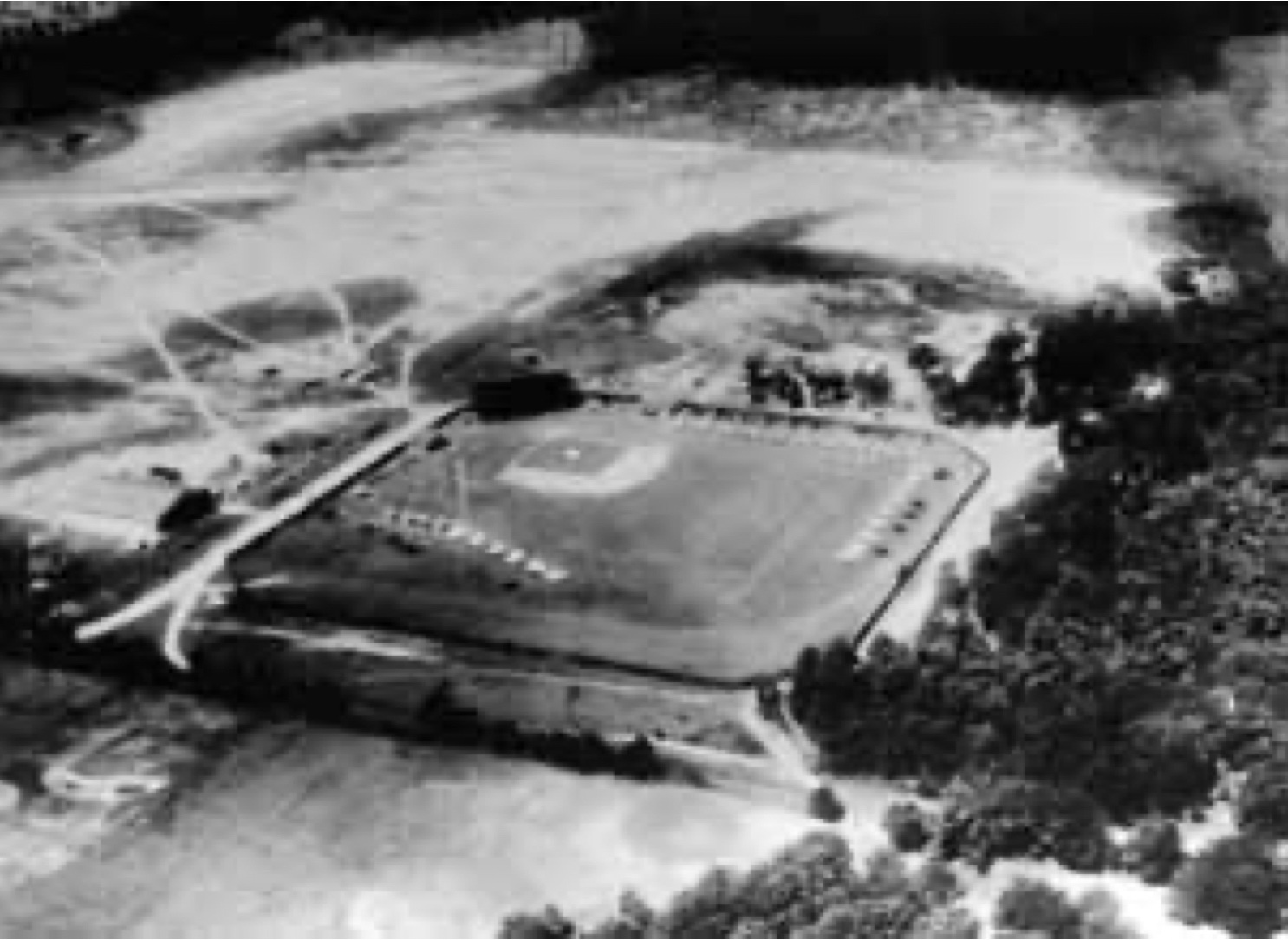
- Biloxi Stadium in 1941
- Location: Biloxi, Mississippi
- Surface: Grass
- Field size: Left Field – ft Center Field – ft Right Field – ft

Construction
- Opened: 1928
- Closed: 1941

Tenants
- Toledo Mud Hens (AA) (spring training) (1928-1929); Washington Senators (AL) (spring training) (1930-1935); Milwaukee Brewers (AA) (spring training) (1937); Philadelphia Phillies (NL) (spring training) (1938)

Biloxi Stadium was a ballpark located in Biloxi, Mississippi and home to amateur and professional baseball in Biloxi from its opening in 1928 until its closure in 1941 to clear land for the construction of Keesler Air Force Base.

The new ballpark was opened in 1928 alongside a new golf course, Coast Guard Base, and zoo. By the 1930s, a veteran's hospital, a boy scout camp, the airport, and a gun club had opened in the area.

Biloxi Stadium was the spring training home of the Toledo Mud Hens in 1928 and 1929, the Washington Senators from 1930 to 1935, the Milwaukee Brewers in 1937, and the Philadelphia Phillies in 1938. Civic booster Tony Ragusin solicited Washington Senators owner Clark Griffith to bring his team to the city from Tampa, Florida to Biloxi for spring training in 1930. Griffith had found Tampa humid and field conditions to be poor.

The ballpark is now the site of Keesler Air Force Base which was constructed in 1941.
