= 2013 Western Athletic Conference baseball tournament =

- Teams: 8
- Format: 2 pool round-robin tournament with championship game
- Finals site: QuikTrip Park; Grand Prairie, TX
- Champions: UTSA (1st title)
- Winning coach: Jason Marshall (1st title)
- MVP: Matt Sims (UTSA)

2013 Western Athletic Conference baseball standings
	Conf.				Overall
Team	W		L	PCT	W		L	PCT
Cal State Bakersfield ‍†‍‍	18	–	9	.667	37	–	22	.627
Texas–Arlington ‍†‍‍	18	–	9	.667	31	–	27	.534
Texas State ‍‍‍	16	–	11	.593	29	–	29	.500
UTSA ‍‍‡‍^{y}	15	–	11	.577	35	–	25	.583
Sacramento State ‍‍‍	14	–	13	.519	34	–	25	.576
New Mexico State ‍‍‍	13	–	14	.481	29	–	28	.509
Dallas Baptist ‍‍‍	13	–	14	.481	30	–	30	.500
San Jose State ‍‍‍	11	–	16	.407	17	–	41	.293
Seattle ‍‍‍	10	–	16	.385	21	–	33	.389
Louisiana Tech ‍‍‍	6	–	21	.222	19	–	37	.339
† – Conference champion ‡ – Tournament champion y – Invited to the NCAA tournament As of June 1, 2013; Rankings from Collegiate Baseball

The 2013 Western Athletic Conference baseball tournament was held beginning May 22 and ending on May 26. The top eight regular season finishers of the league's ten teams met in the round-robin tournament held at QuikTrip Park in Grand Prairie, Texas. UTSA won their first tournament championship and earned the Western Athletic Conference's automatic bid to the 2013 NCAA Division I baseball tournament. UTSA departed for Conference USA after the 2013 season, again leaving the conference with no team that had ever won the tournament for 2014.

== Seeding and format ==
The top eight finishers from the regular season were seeded based on conference winning percentage. They were divided into two groups of four, which played a round robin format. The winners of each group then played a single championship game.

Team	W	L	Pct.	GB	Seed
Cal State Bakersfield	18	9	.667	–	1
Texas–Arlington	18	9	.667	–	2
Texas State	16	11	.593	2	3
UTSA	15	11	.577	2.5	4
Sacramento State	14	13	.519	4	5
New Mexico State	13	14	.481	5	6
Dallas Baptist	13	14	.481	5	7
San Jose State	11	16	.407	7	8
Seattle	10	16	.385	7.5	–
Louisiana Tech	6	21	.222	12	–

== Results ==
All times shown are US CDT. If 2 teams tie in pool play, the head-to-head winner advances to the final.

	Division A	CSUB	UTSA	SSU	SJSU	Overall
1	Cal State Bakersfield		L 0–1	W 7–1	W 11–3	2–1
4	UTSA	W 1–0		W 3–2	W 13–3	3–0
5	Sacramento State	L 1–7	L 2–3		W 3–0	1–2
8	San Jose State	L 3–11	L 3–13	L 0–3		0–3

	Division B	UTA	TSU	NMSU	DBU	Overall
2	Texas–Arlington		L 2–11	L 3–4	W 2–0	1–2
3	Texas State	W 11–2		W 9–4	L 5–7	2–1
6	New Mexico State	W 4–3	L 4–9		L 4–12	1–2
7	Dallas Baptist	L 0–2	W 7–5	W 12–4		2–1

Finals
A	UTSA	11
B	Dallas Baptist	4

=== Division A ===
Wednesday, May 22 11:03 a.m.
Team	1	2	3	4	5	6	7	8	9	10	11	12	13	14	R	H	E
#5 Sacramento State	0	0	1	0	0	0	0	1	0	0	0	0	0	0	2	7	2
#4 UTSA	0	0	0	1	0	0	1	0	0	0	0	0	0	1	3	7	0
WP: Matt Sims (5–2) LP: Brandon Creel (8–4); Home runs: SAC: Andrew Ayers (10); UTSA: RJ Perucki (11), Jesse Baker (4); Attendance: N/A; Notes: Duration: 3:02; Weather: 69 °F (21 °C), Sunny, winds 2mph to Right; Boxscore

Wednesday, May 22 3:03 p.m.
Team	1	2	3	4	5	6	7	8	9	R	H	E
#8 San Jose State	0	0	0	0	3	0	0	0	0	3	10	2
#1 Cal State Bakersfield	2	2	0	0	4	0	3	0	x	11	11	0
WP: Jeff McKenzie (13–2) LP: David Wayne Russo (4–9); Home runs: SJSU: None; CSUB: None; Attendance: 1,204; Notes: Duration: 2:09; Weather: 82 °F (28 °C), Sunny, winds 2mph to Right; Boxscore

Thursday, May 23 3:03 p.m.
Team	1	2	3	4	5	6	7	8	9	R	H	E
#4 UTSA	4	0	0	2	0	0	6	1	x	13	20	0
#8 San Jose State	0	2	0	0	0	1	0	0	x	3	8	3
WP: Logan Onda (1–2) LP: Kyle Hassna (4–5); Home runs: UTSA: Daniel Rockett (10), RJ Perucki (12); SJSU: None; Attendance: N/A; Notes: Duration: 2:36; Weather: 85 °F (29 °C), wind 10mph to left Boxscore

Thursday, May 23 7:00 p.m.
Team	1	2	3	4	5	6	7	8	9	R	H	E
#1 Cal State Bakersfield	0	0	1	0	0	2	0	3	1	7	9	0
#5 Sacramento State	0	0	0	0	0	0	0	1	0	1	4	0
WP: Jonathan Montoya (4–3) LP: Tanner Mendonca (2–6); Home runs: CSUB: None; SAC: Kyle Moses (1); Attendance: 1,040; Notes: Duration: 2:55; Weather: 82 °F (28 °C), wind across to left @ 11mph Boxscore

Friday, May 24 7:00 p.m.
Team	1	2	3	4	5	6	7	8	9	R	H	E
#4 UTSA	0	0	0	0	0	1	0	0	0	1	9	0
#1 Cal State Bakersfield	0	0	0	0	0	0	0	0	0	0	3	0
WP: none LP: none Sv: none Home runs: UTSA: none CSUB: none Attendance: 1339; Notes: Duration: After 1:54 the game was stopped for the night and continued the next day, Weather 78F, wind across LF @ 8 MPH; Boxscore

Saturday, May 25 11:00 a.m.
Team	1	2	3	4	5	6	7	8	9	R	H	E
#8 San Jose State	0	0	0	0	0	0	0	0	0	0	6	&1
#5 Sacramento State	0	0	0	0	0	&1	0	2	x	3	9	0
WP: Zach Morgan (7–2) LP: D.J. Slaton (4–8) Sv: Brandon Creel (2); Home runs: SJSU: none SAC: none Attendance: 1090; Notes: Duration: 1:59, Weather: 76F, wind across LF @ 12 MPH; Boxscore

=== Division B ===
Wednesday, May 22 7:00 p.m.
Team	1	2	3	4	5	6	7	8	9	R	H	E
#7 Dallas Baptist	0	0	0	0	0	0	0	0	0	0	3	1
#2 Texas-Arlington	0	1	0	0	0	0	1	0	x	2	8	1
WP: Brad Vachon (7–4) LP: Cy Sneed (4–4) Sv: Daniel Milliman (3); Home runs: DBU: None; UTA: None; Attendance: 1,204; Notes: Duration: 2:25; Weather: 83 °F (28 °C), wind in from right @ 8mph Boxscore

Thursday, May 23 11:03 a.m.
Team	1	2	3	4	5	6	7	8	9	R	H	E
#6 New Mexico State	0	2	0	0	0	0	0	2	0	4	9	2
#3 Texas State	1	1	3	0	4	0	0	0	x	9	11	0
WP: Lucas Humpal (5–2) LP: Adam Mott (6–6); Home runs: NMSU: Robert Lecount (15); TXST: Garrett Mattlage (3), Ben McElroy (1); Attendance: N/A; Notes: Duration: 2:48; Weather: 77 °F (25 °C), wind in from CF @ 8mph Boxscore

Friday, May 24 11:00 a.m.
Team	1	2	3	4	5	6	7	8	9	R	H	E
#3 Texas State	0	1	0	0	0	1	0	3	0	5	10	1
#7 Dallas Baptist	1	1	0	1	4	0	0	0	x	7	10	1
WP: Jake Johansen (7–6) LP: Taylor Black (3–7) Sv: Aaron Gilbreath (1); Home runs: TXST: Nick Smelser (2); DBU: Michael Miller (7); Attendance: N/A; Notes: Duration: 2:54; Weather: 79 °F (26 °C), wind across to LF @ 7mph Boxscore

Friday, May 24 3:00 p.m.
Team	1	2	3	4	5	6	7	8	9	R	H	E
#2 Texas-Arlington	0	0	0	0	0	0	0	3	0	3	10	2
#6 New Mexico State	0	0	0	3	0	1	0	0	x	4	4	1
WP: Ryan Beck (8–4) LP: Zach Thompson (6–5) Sv: Evan Mott (4); Home runs: UTA: None; NMSU: None; Attendance: N/A; Notes: Duration: 2:18; Weather: 82 °F (28 °C), wind in from CF @ 10mph

Saturday, May 25 3:00 p.m.
Team	1	2	3	4	5	6	7	8	9	R	H	E
#7 Dallas Baptist	4	1	0	0	1	1	3	0	0	12	14	1
#6 New Mexico State	0	0	0	0	3	0	0	1	0	4	9	1
WP: Paul Voelker (1–2) LP: Christopher Bradley (5–5) Sv: none Home runs: DBU: Michael Miller (2), Mike Mesolowski (1); NMSU: Quinnton Mack (1); Notes: Duration: 3:02, Weather: 80F, wind across LF @ MPH; Boxscore

Saturday, May 25 7:00 p.m.
Team	1	2	3	4	5	6	7	8	9	R	H	E
#3 Texas State	1	0	2	0	0	4	0	1	3	11	15	1
#2 Texas-Arlington	0	0	0	0	0	2	0	0	0	2	8	1
WP: none LP: none Sv: none Home runs: TXST: Kevin Sah (1); UTA: none Notes: Weather: 72F, wind across LF @ 8 MPH; Boxscore

=== Championship final ===
Sunday, May 26 1:00 p.m.
Team	1	2	3	4	5	6	7	8	9	R	H	E
#7 Dallas Baptist	0	2	0	0	0	0	0	0	2	4	6	4
#4 UTSA	0	0	0	0	2	2	2	5	x	11	14	1
WP: Brock Hartson (9–4) LP: Michael Smith (9–7) Sv: Logan Onda (2); Home runs: DBU: Austin Listi (1); UTSA: none Attendance: 1,505; Notes: Duration: 2:51, Weather:71F, wind across LF @14MPH; Boxscore

== All-Tournament Team ==
The following players were named to the All-Tournament Team.

Name	POS	School
Michael Miller	C	Dallas Baptist
Oscar Sanay	IF	CSU Bakersfield
Colby Targun	IF	Texas State
Andrew Ayers	IF	Sacramento State
Kyle Phillips	OF	New Mexico State
Brock Hartson	P	UTSA
Mike Wesolowski	IF	Dallas Baptist
Matt Sims	P	UTSA
Riley Good	OF	UTSA
RJ Perucki	IF	UTSA
John Bormann	Util	UTSA

=== Most Valuable Player ===
Matt Sims was named Tournament Most Valuable Player. Sims was a pitcher for UTSA.
