= Reckling Park =

Baseball stadium in Houston, Texas, US

Coordinates: 29°42′48″N 95°24′15″W

- (Cameron Field at Reckling Park)
- Interactive map of Reckling Park
- Location: Houston, Texas
- Owner: Rice University
- Operator: Rice University
- Capacity: 7,000
- Surface: Artificial Turf (Starting with 2023 Season)
- Field size: Left field - 330 ft Left Center - 375 ft Center field - 400 ft Right Center - 375 ft Right field - 330 ft

Construction
- Groundbreaking: 1999
- Opened: February 8, 2000
- Architects: Jackson & Ryan

Tenants
- Rice University baseball (NCAA) (2000–present); C-USA Tournament (2006)

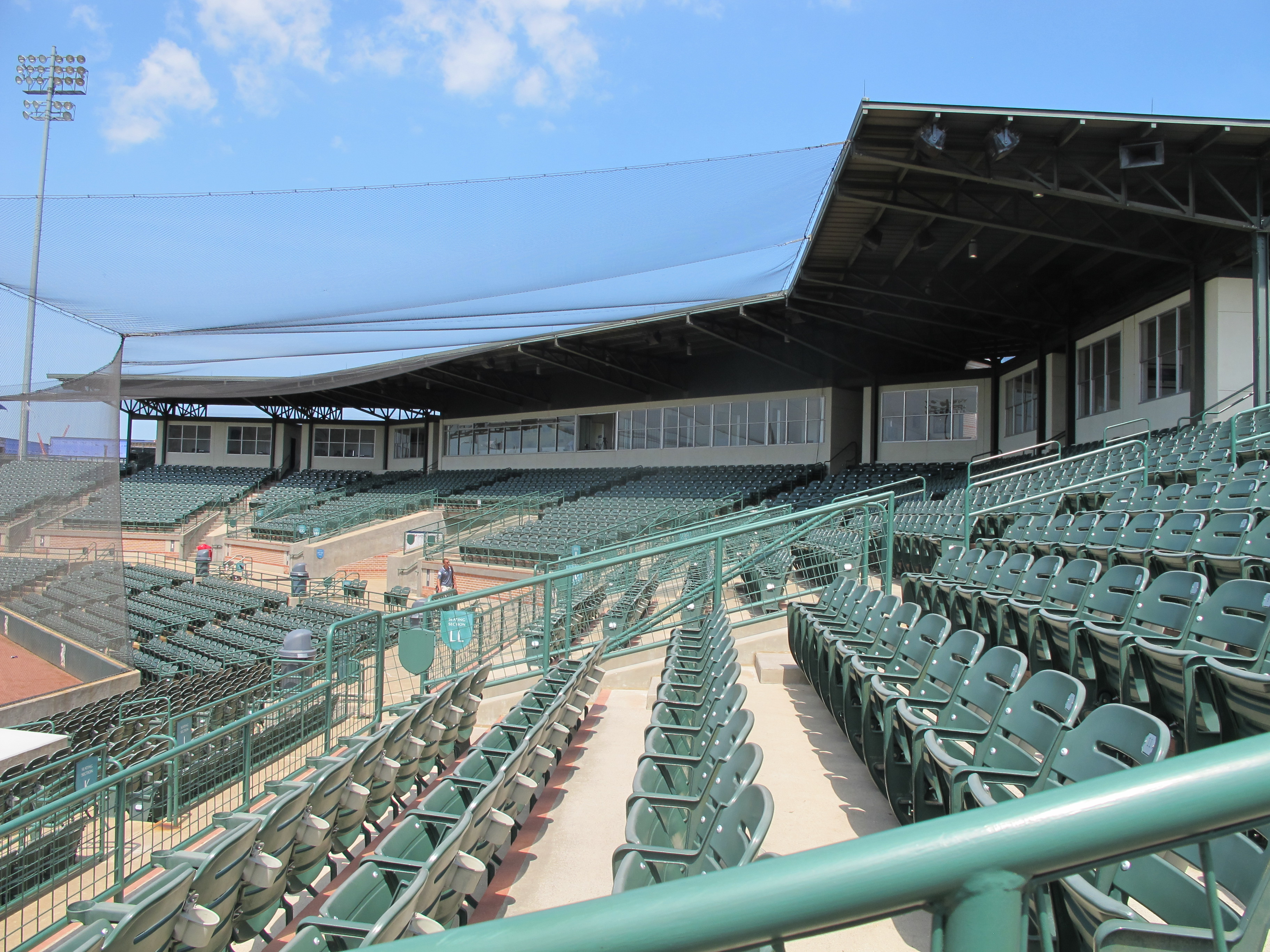
Rice's Reckling Ballpark Stands, 2016

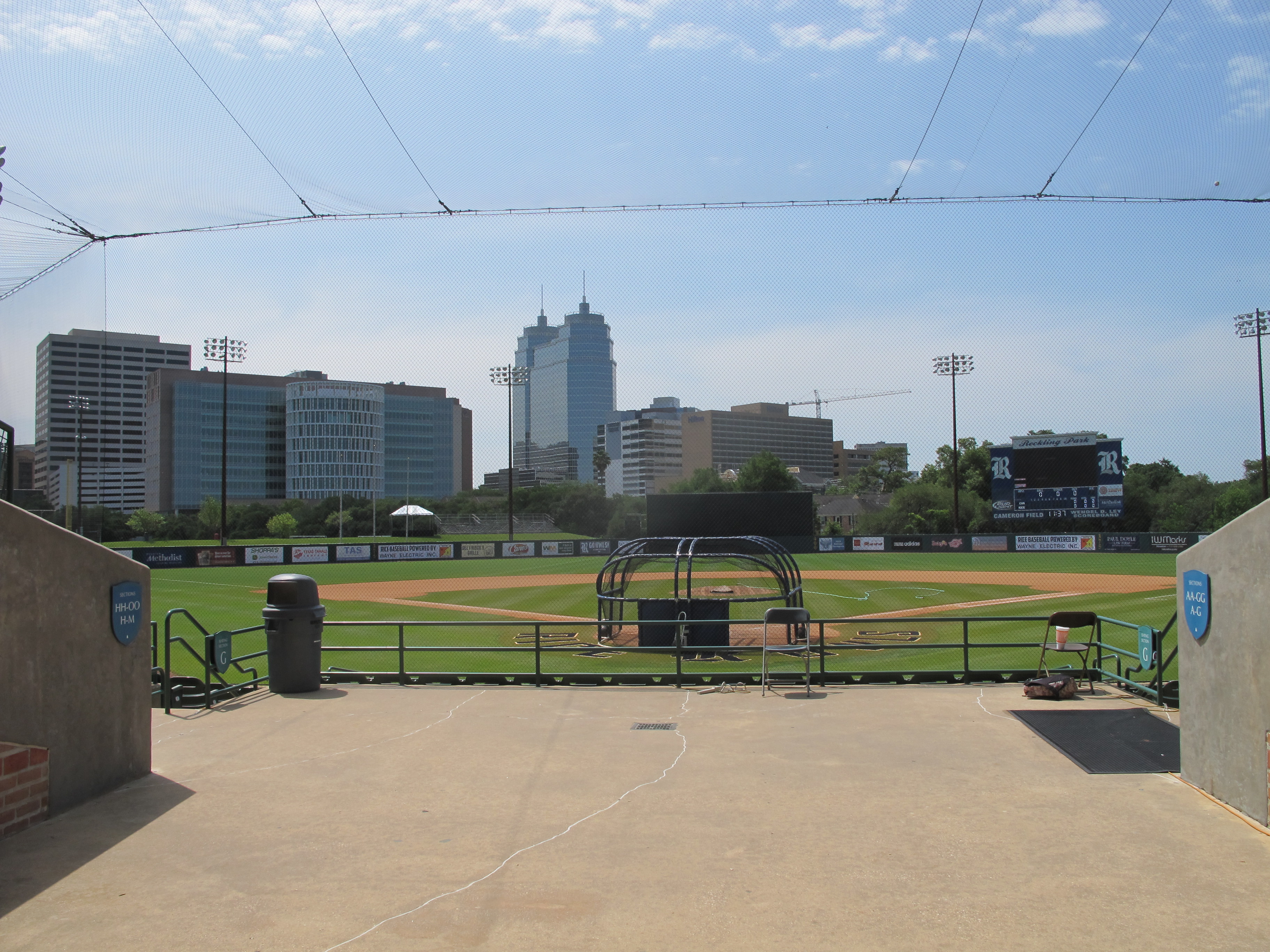
Rice Reckling's Field spectacular Center field view of the Houston Medical Center

Reckling Park is the baseball stadium at Rice University in Houston, Texas, US. It serves as the home field of the Rice Owls baseball team. The stadium was built on the site of Cameron Field, Rice's home from 1978 to 1999, in time for the 2000 season. The Owls have hosted 10 NCAA regional and five super regional tournaments at Reckling Park, including one of each in their national championship season of 2003 and in the years of other College World Series appearances, 2002, 2006, 2007, and 2008. The stadium was named for its principal donor, former Rice player Tommy Reckling.

The nearby Texas Medical Center can be seen from the outfield.

== Program history ==
In the first game, the University of Houston beat Rice 6–2 on February 8, 2000. Since then, Rice has been very successful at Reckling Park. Under head coach Wayne Graham, the Owls are 219–46 at Reckling Park, an .826 winning percentage. Rice won three consecutive NCAA regionals at Reckling Park from 2001 to 2003 and advanced to the College World Series by winning back-to-back NCAA super regionals at home in 2002 and 2003.

The Owls have made late-inning rallies traditional at Reckling Park, starting with the 2001 season. On February 10, 2001, Rice beat top-ranked Georgia Tech 5-4 after trailing 4–3 with two outs and no runners on base in the ninth inning. The Owls used similar drama to win the 2001 NCAA regional in its decisive seventh game. Rice trailed 4-2 entering the ninth inning against Baylor but rallied to win 5–4.

Rice won several games in its last at-bat in 2002, and the home season culminated with 6–0 and 3–0 shutouts of LSU at Reckling Park in the NCAA super regionals, the only time in the seven-year history of the super regionals a team has been shut out in both games.

The 2003 season was the culmination of an 11-year building process for head coach Wayne Graham, and Rice won a school-record 30 consecutive games in February, March, and April, including 22 wins at Reckling Park, en route to a 58–12 record. The streak was highlighted by a 2–1, 10-inning win against defending national champion Texas March 11. In the postseason, Rice rallied from a first-game defeat against crosstown rival Houston to again win the super regional at Reckling Park. In the 2003 College World Series, Rice beat Southwest Missouri State, rival Texas twice, and Stanford two-games-to-one to capture its first national championship in any team sport.

The stadium was also the site of the biggest upset in NCAA baseball postseason history, when Texas Southern upset Rice 4–3 in the opening game of the 2004 NCAA tournament. The Tigers entered the tournament with an 18–33 record. Rice avenged the loss the following night but was eliminated by Texas A&M in the final game of the regional.

Rice joined Conference USA in 2005–06, and the next C-USA baseball tournament was held at Reckling Park in May 2006. With eight teams on hand, Rice (the regular-season champion) won its 11th consecutive conference title with an 11–5 championship game win over crosstown rival Houston. Continuing the postseason at home, the Owls beat Baylor for the regional title and Oklahoma in the super regional to advance to the 2006 College World Series.

In 2007, Rice went 33–3 at Reckling Park and extended its streak of consecutive home series wins (at least 2-games-to-1) to 39 series, dating back to 2001. In June, Rice hosted its sixth regional in its seven years at Reckling Park, beating TCU twice to advance to the super regional. Rice improved to 4–0 in super regionals held at Reckling Park by sweeping Texas A&M in two hard-fought games, advancing to the 2007 College World Series.

In 2008, Rice's streak of consecutive home series wins ended after 40 series and almost seven years when Rice lost two of three against Southern Miss in March. The Owls hosted their seventh regional in eight years and beat Sam Houston State, St. John's, and rival Texas to advance to the super regional, where Rice swept Texas A&M for the second straight year. Rice finished the year with a 28–5 home record.

== Attendance ==
Reckling Park attendance
Year	Total	Average
2000	70,188	2,005
2001	99,574	2,620
2002	92,069	2,488
2003	119,479	3,064
2004	116,269	3,230
2005	96,390	3,012
2006	131,467	3,287
2007	98,932	2,909
2008	99,475	3,109
2009	100,036	3,334
2010	98,365	3,513
2011	116,677	3,535
2012	114,031	3,455
2013	97,582	3,252
2014	77,404	2,669
2015	84,187	2,903
2016	83,073	2,769
2017	73,351	2,445
2018	83,346	2,874
2019	77,431	2,497
2020	24,604	2,733
Total	1,953,930	2,960

As the Rice baseball program and its following grew, so did the stadium. The seating area was expanded during the 2004 season, making the grandstand symmetrical and enlarging capacity in time for the 2004 postseason. The stadium record for single-game attendance rose from 4,117 for the stadium's first game (2000) to 4,615 for the NCAA super regional against LSU (2002) to 5,227, set against Texas in 2005, to 5,368, set against Texas A&M on back-to-back days during the 2008 super regional. In the 2014 NCAA regional, two games between Texas A&M and the University of Texas drew standing-room crowds of more than 6,600 to set new records.

Rice drew a season total of more than 100,000 fans for the first time in 2003, with a school-record total of 119,479. After winning the 2003 national championship, average attendance rose to 3,230 per game in 2004. It was the second consecutive year Rice ranked in the nation's top 10 in average attendance.

Rice hosted its first conference tournament in 2006 and drew 18,137 fans to the tournament's seven sessions, averaging 2,591 fans per session. The championship game, featuring intracity rivals Rice and Houston, drew 3,732 fans. The Owls also hosted NCAA regional and super regional tournaments, pushing total attendance to a school-record total of 131,467 and a school-record average of 3,287 fans per game, narrowly outdrawing the 2004 season.

In 2013, the Owls ranked 15th among Division I baseball programs in attendance, averaging 3,252 per home game.

Single Game Crowds

Date	Game	Crowd
June 2, 2014*	Texas vs. Texas A&M	6,825
May 30, 2014*	Texas vs. Texas A&M	6,603
April 5, 2016	Rice vs. Texas A&M	5,478
June 8, 2008**	Rice vs. Texas A&M	5,368
June 7, 2008**	Rice vs. Texas A&M	5,368
June 9, 2007**	Rice vs. Texas A&M	5,234
April 20, 2005	Rice vs. Texas	5,227
May 31, 2014*	Rice vs. Texas	5,199

Date	Game	Crowd
March 7, 2006	Rice vs. Texas	5,105
June 4, 2004*	Texas A&M vs. Lamar	5,076
June 8, 2007**	Rice vs. Texas A&M	5,074
June 1, 2014*	Texas vs. Texas A&M	5,011
April 17, 2007	Rice vs. Texas	5,003
June 10, 2006**	Rice vs. Oklahoma	4,975
June 1, 2008*	Rice vs. Texas	4,895
June 6, 2004*	Rice vs. Texas A&M	4,841

* NCAA Regional
** NCAA Super Regional

== Tournaments Hosted ==
=== Regular season ===
- Cameron Invitational: 1983, 1984
- Rice Classic: 1995-2002
- Rice Invitational: 1995-2007

=== Postseason ===
- Conference USA Tournament (1): 2006, 2023
- NCAA Regional (11): 2001, 2002, 2003, 2004, 2006, 2007, 2008, 2009, 2011, 2012, 2014
- NCAA Super Regional (5): 2002, 2003, 2006, 2007, 2008

== See also ==
- List of NCAA Division I baseball venues
