= 2017 Conference USA baseball tournament =

- Teams: 8
- Format: Double elimination
- Finals site: MGM Park; Biloxi, Mississippi
- Champions: Rice (7th title)
- Winning coach: Wayne Graham (7th title)
- MVP: Glenn Otto (Rice)
- Television: ESPN3 (First round–semifinals); CBSSN (Championship game)

2017 Conference USA baseball standings
	Conf.						Overall
Team	W		L		T	PCT	W		L		T	PCT
No. 23 Southern Miss^{y}^{†} ‍‍‍	25	–	5	–	0	.833	50	–	16	–	0	.758
Old Dominion ‍‍‍	19	–	11	–	0	.633	37	–	21	–	0	.638
Florida Atlantic ‍‍‍	18	–	12	–	0	.600	35	–	21	–	1	.623
Charlotte ‍‍‍	18	–	12	–	0	.600	34	–	24	–	0	.586
Louisiana Tech ‍‍‍	17	–	13	–	0	.567	36	–	20	–	0	.643
Rice^{y} ‍‍‡‍	16	–	14	–	0	.533	33	–	31	–	0	.516
FIU ‍‍‍	15	–	15	–	0	.500	31	–	27	–	0	.534
UTSA ‍‍‍	15	–	15	–	0	.500	29	–	28	–	0	.509
Marshall ‍‍‍	12	–	18	–	0	.400	25	–	29	–	0	.463
Middle Tennessee ‍‍‍	10	–	20	–	0	.333	24	–	31	–	0	.436
UAB ‍‍‍	9	–	21	–	0	.300	24	–	31	–	0	.436
Western Kentucky ‍‍‍	6	–	24	–	0	.200	16	–	39	–	0	.291
† – Conference champion ‡ – Tournament champion y – Invited to the NCAA tournament Rankings from Collegiate Baseball

The 2017 Conference USA baseball tournament was held from May 24 through 28 at MGM Park in Biloxi, Mississippi. The annual tournament determines the conference champion of the Division I Conference USA for college baseball. The tournament champion received the league's automatic bid to the 2017 NCAA Division I baseball tournament.

The tournament was established in 1996, Conference USA's first season of play. Rice has won the most championships, with six.

== Seeding and format ==
The top eight finishers from the regular season will be seeded one through eight. The tournament will use a double elimination format.

== Bracket and results ==
First round
1	Southern Miss	2
8	UTSA	9
4	Charlotte	7
5	Louisiana Tech	2
1	Southern Miss	5
5	Louisiana Tech	2
3	Florida Atlantic	3
6	Rice	5
2	Old Dominion	3
7	FIU	2
3	Florida Atlantic	8
7	FIU	4

Second round
8	UTSA	0
4	Charlotte	5
8	UTSA	1
1	Southern Miss	7
6	Rice	4
2	Old Dominion	3
3	Florida Atlantic	6
2	Old Dominion	2

Semifinals
4	Charlotte	5	8
1	Southern Miss	6	10
6	Rice	13^{7}	-
3	Florida Atlantic	2	-

Final
1	Southern Miss	4
6	Rice	5

== Conference championship ==
Conference USA Championship
(1) Southern Miss Golden Eagles	vs.	(6) Rice Owls

May 28, 2017, 1:07 p.m. (CDT) at MGM Park in Biloxi, Mississippi
Team	1	2	3	4	5	6	7	8	9	R	H	E
(1) Southern Miss	0	0	1	1	2	0	0	0	0	4	5	1
(6) Rice	0	0	0	2	0	0	2	0	1	5	12	2
WP: Glenn Otto (6–4) LP: Trent Driver (2–1); Home runs: USM: Matt Wallner (1); Rice: None; Attendance: 5,216
