= 2018 Conference USA baseball tournament =

- Teams: 8
- Format: Double elimination
- Finals site: MGM Park; Biloxi, Mississippi
- Champions: Southern Miss (4th title)
- Winning coach: Scott Berry (3rd title)
- MVP: Mason Strickland (Southern Miss)
- Television: ESPN3 (First round–semifinals); CBSSN (Championship game)

2018 Conference USA baseball standings
	Conf.						Overall
Team	W		L		T	PCT	W		L		T	PCT
No. 13 Southern Miss ‍†‍‡‍	23	–	6	–	0	.793	39	–	15	–	0	.722
Louisiana Tech ‍‍‍	21	–	9	–	0	.700	38	–	18	–	0	.679
Florida Atlantic ‍‍‍	19	–	8	–	1	.696	36	–	15	–	1	.702
Charlotte ‍‍‍	17	–	13	–	0	.567	31	–	22	–	0	.585
UTSA ‍‍‍	16	–	13	–	0	.552	31	–	22	–	0	.585
FIU ‍‍‍	14	–	12	–	0	.538	25	–	25	–	0	.500
Rice ‍‍‍	11	–	14	–	2	.444	23	–	28	–	2	.453
UAB ‍‍‍	13	–	17	–	0	.433	21	–	31	–	0	.404
Middle Tennessee ‍‍‍	12	–	17	–	1	.417	27	–	27	–	1	.500
Western Kentucky ‍‍‍	11	–	18	–	0	.379	21	–	31	–	0	.404
Marshall ‍‍‍	7	–	22	–	0	.241	19	–	31	–	0	.380
Old Dominion ‍‍‍	7	–	22	–	0	.241	15	–	37	–	0	.288
† – Conference champion ‡ – Tournament champion y – Invited to the NCAA tournament Rankings from Collegiate Baseball

The 2018 Conference USA baseball tournament was held between May 24 and May 28 at MGM Park in Biloxi, Mississippi. The annual tournament determines the conference champion of the Division I Conference USA for college baseball. As tournament champion, Southern Mississippi received the league's automatic bid to the 2018 NCAA Division I baseball tournament.

The tournament was established in 1996, Conference USA's first season of play. Rice has won the most championships, with seven, including 2017.

== Seeding and format ==
The top eight finishers from the regular season will be seeded one through eight. The tournament will use a double elimination format.

== Bracket and results ==
First round
1	Southern Miss	2
8	UAB	0
4	Charlotte	1
5	UTSA	11
8	UAB	0
4	Charlotte	2
3	Florida Atlantic	7
6	FIU	4
2	Louisiana Tech	2
7	Rice	6
6	FIU	5
2	Louisiana Tech	7

Second round
1	Southern Miss	5
5	UTSA	3
4	Charlotte	10
5	UTSA	4
3	Florida Atlantic	4
7	Rice	5
2	Louisiana Tech	6
3	Florida Atlantic	8

Semifinals
1	Southern Miss	4	6
4	Charlotte	7	0
7	Rice	4	8
3	Florida Atlantic	7	9_{(10)}

Finals
1	Southern Miss	12
3	Florida Atlantic	3

== Conference championship ==
Conference USA Championship
(3) Florida Atlantic Owls	vs.	(1) Southern Miss Golden Eagles

May 27, 2018, 1:06 p.m. (CDT) at MGM Park in Biloxi, Mississippi
Team	1	2	3	4	5	6	7	8	9	R	H	E
(3) Florida Atlantic	0	0	0	0	0	0	3	0	0	3	9	1
(1) Southern Miss	2	2	0	0	1	0	2	5	X	12	15	1
WP: Keller Bradford (3–1) LP: Nick Prather (0–3); Home runs: FAU: Gunnar Lambert (1); USM: Gabe Montenegro (1); Matt Wallner (1); Bryant Bowen (1); Attendance: 2,206
