= Keesler Federal Park =

Baseball park in Biloxi, Mississippi, United States

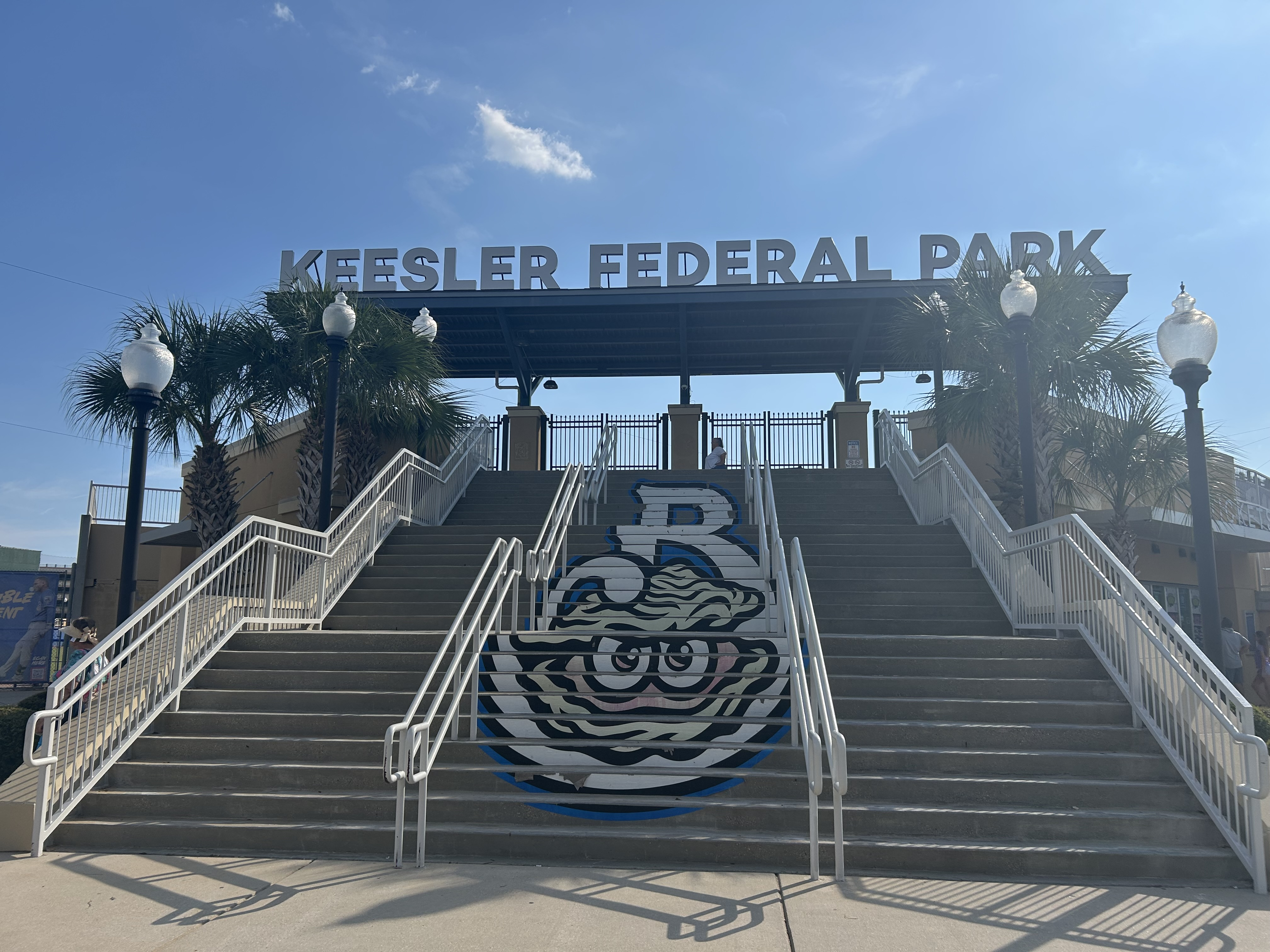
- The entrance to Keesler Federal Park in 2025
- Interactive map of Keesler Federal Park
- Former names: Caillavet Park (planning); MGM Park (2015–2023)
- Location: 105 Caillavet Street; Biloxi, Mississippi; United States
- Coordinates: 30.395741°N 88.893463°W
- Elevation: 21 ft (6 m)
- Owner: City of Biloxi
- Operator: Biloxi Baseball
- Capacity: 6,098
- Surface: Bermuda Tifway 419 grass
- Record attendance: 6,231 (July 3, 2015; Biloxi Shuckers vs. Mississippi Braves)
- Field size: Left field: 325 ft (99 m); Left-center field: 350 ft (110 m); Center field: 400 ft (120 m); Right-center field: 350 ft (110 m); Right field: 325 ft (99 m)
- Acreage: 10.4 acres (4.2 ha)
- Public transit: CTA

Construction
- Groundbreaking: January 23, 2014
- Opened: June 6, 2015
- Cost: $36 million ($49 million in 2025 dollars)
- Architect: Dale Partners Architects P. A.
- Structural engineers: Joe DeReuil Associates, LLC
- General contractors: W. G. Yates & Sons

Tenant
- Biloxi Shuckers (SL) 2015–present

Keesler Federal Park, formerly known as MGM Park, is a baseball park in Biloxi, Mississippi. The home of the Double-A Biloxi Shuckers of the Southern League, it opened on June 6, 2015, and can seat up to 6,067 people. The stadium was the site of the 2019 Southern League All-Star Game. Though primarily a venue for Minor League Baseball, it was the home of the Conference USA baseball tournament from 2017 to 2019. Concerts have also been held at the venue.

== Planning and construction ==
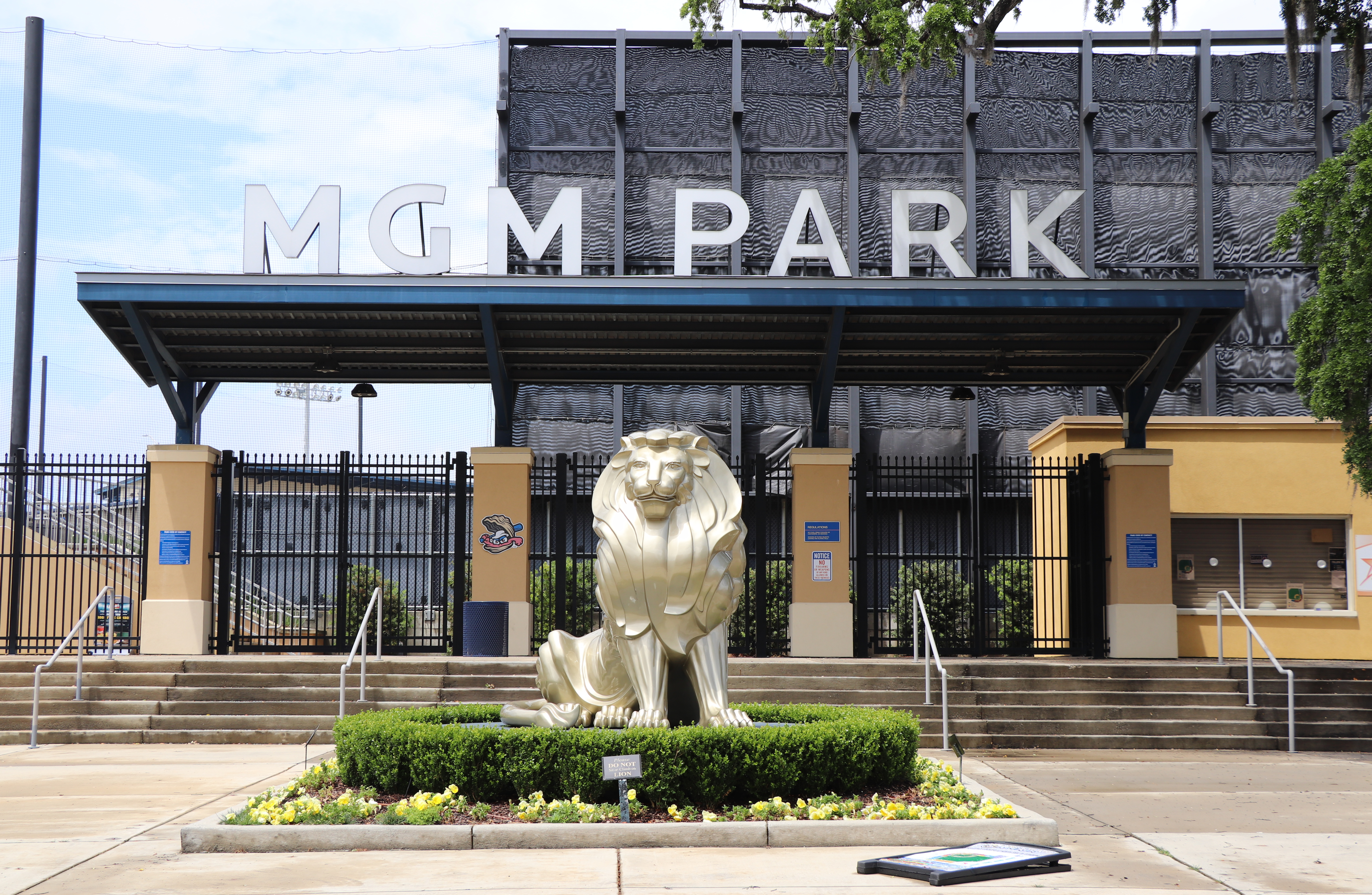
The entrance to MGM Park in 2018

In January 2014, Ken Young purchased a majority interest in the Huntsville Stars, a Double-A Minor League Baseball team of the Southern League. The franchise relocated from Huntsville, Alabama to Biloxi, Mississippi, after the 2014 season. Upon arrival in Mississippi, the team would become known as the Biloxi Shuckers in reference to the city's oyster industry and seafood heritage.

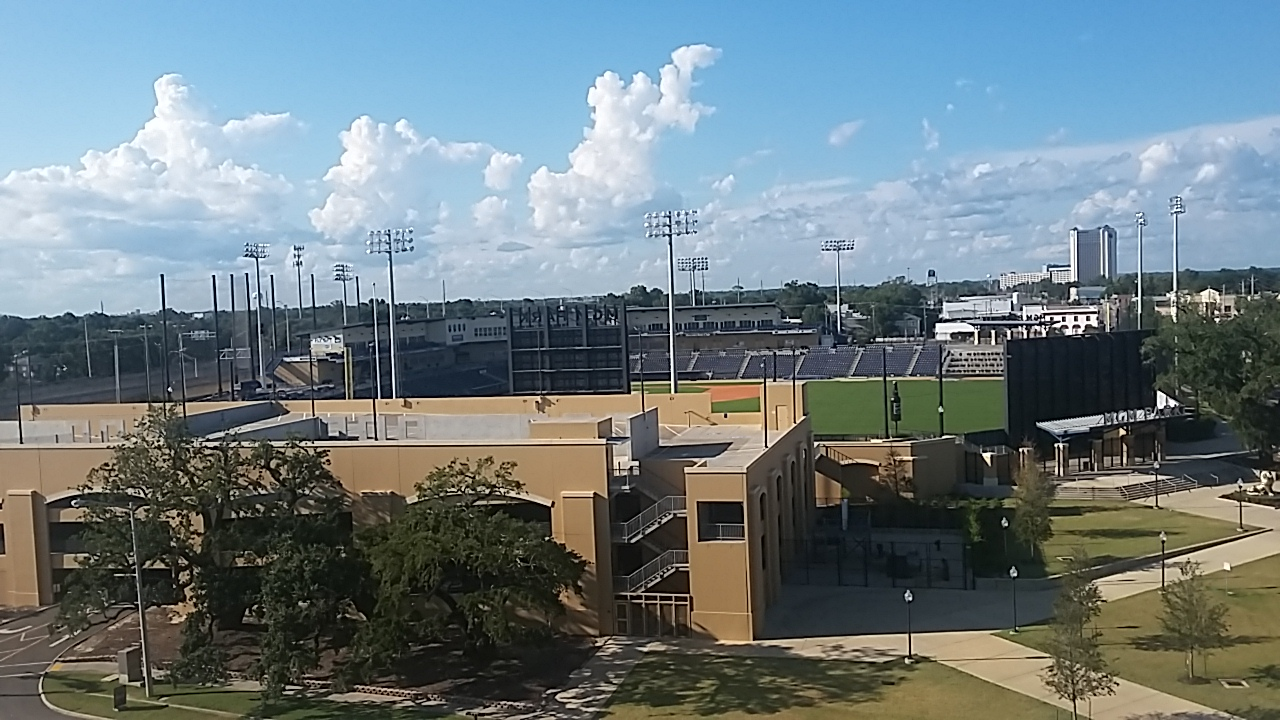
The ballpark as seen from beyond the right field parking garage

A groundbreaking ceremony was held on January 23, 2014, before the Biloxi City Council approved the project's construction. Their final approval came on May 9, 2014, when they voted unanimously, without public discussion, to cancel its project management contract with Yates Construction. Because of this, the expected completion date of the ballpark was pushed from April 2015 to May 17, 2015. The city had decided to "separately bid each phase" of construction "rather than drafting specifications for the entire project", but the council instead would "bid the entire project". Yates Construction was awarded the new contract via a 5–2 vote by the Biloxi City Council on July 22, 2014.

MGM Resorts International purchased the naming rights to the stadium in September 2014 for a period of 20 years, naming it MGM Park. The Beau Rivage relinquished naming rights to the City of Biloxi on May 31, 2023. Keesler Federal Credit Union won the naming rights for the ballpark in April 2024, and the facility became known as Keesler Federal Park. The official ribbon cutting for Keesler Federal Park happened on September 15, 2024.

== Tenants and events ==
=== Minor League Baseball ===
Due to construction delays, the Shuckers played the first 54 games of their inaugural 2015 season on the road. The team's MGM Park home opener was played on June 6, 2015, versus the Mobile BayBears, a 4–3 victory. Going into extra innings, Nick Shaw singled home Brent Suter from second base in the bottom of the fourteenth inning to secure the win. The inaugural home opener was attended by 5,065 people. The stadium's single-game attendance record was set later that season when 6,231 people saw Biloxi defeated by the Mississippi Braves, 4–3, on July 3.

On April 2, 2016, the ballpark was the site of an exhibition game between the Shuckers and their Major League Baseball (MLB) affiliate, the Milwaukee Brewers. Players appearing for the Brewers in the game included Ryan Braun, Domingo Santana, Jonathan Villar, Martín Maldonado, and Chase Anderson. The 7–4 Milwaukee win was attended by 5,152 people. This was the first time a major league team played in Biloxi since the 1938 Philadelphia Phillies held spring training at Biloxi Stadium.

Shuckers pitchers threw the first no-hitter in franchise history on August 14, 2017, at MGM Park. Hiram Burgos (2 IP), Forrest Snow (3 IP), Nick Ramirez (1 IP), and Jorge López (1 IP) combined for the effort in the second game of a seven-inning doubleheader against the Tennessee Smokies, a 1–0 win.

MGM Park hosted the Southern League All-Star Game on June 18, 2019. The North Division All-Stars defeated the South Division All-Stars, 7–3, with 4,209 people on hand. Luis Robert of the Birmingham Barons was selected as the game's Most Valuable Player. Jeffrey Baez of the Jackson Generals won the previous day's Home Run Derby.

=== College baseball ===
The Conference USA baseball tournament was held at MGM Park from 2017 to 2019. The 2020 tournament was to be held at MGM park but was cancelled due to the COVID-19 pandemic. The tournament moved to Ruston, Louisiana, in 2021 and the locations will vary.

== Features ==
The stadium layout is organized around the concourse level that wraps around the field and includes concessions, a lounge and a team store. The majority of the seating is located below the concourse level with 12 suites situated above the concourse.
