= 2019 Conference USA baseball tournament =

- Teams: 8
- Format: Double elimination
- Finals site: MGM Park; Biloxi, Mississippi
- Champions: Southern Miss (5th title)
- Winning coach: Scott Berry (4th title)
- MVP: Matt Wallner (Southern Miss)
- Television: ESPN+ (first round–semifinals); CBSSN (championship game)

2019 Conference USA baseball standings
| | Conf. | | | | | | Overall |
| Team | W | | L | | T | PCT | W | | L | | T | PCT |
|---|---|---|---|---|---|---|---|---|---|---|---|---|
| Florida Atlantic ‍†‍‍^{y} | 22 | – | 8 | – | 0 | .733 | 41 | – | 21 | – | 0 | .661 |
| Southern Miss ‍‍‡‍^{y} | 20 | – | 10 | – | 0 | .667 | 40 | – | 21 | – | 0 | .656 |
| Louisiana Tech ‍‍‍ | 17 | – | 13 | – | 0 | .567 | 34 | – | 24 | – | 0 | .586 |
| Western Kentucky ‍‍‍ | 16 | – | 13 | – | 1 | .550 | 26 | – | 29 | – | 1 | .473 |
| Old Dominion ‍‍‍ | 16 | – | 14 | – | 0 | .533 | 35 | – | 21 | – | 0 | .625 |
| Marshall ‍‍‍ | 14 | – | 15 | – | 0 | .483 | 29 | – | 28 | – | 0 | .509 |
| Rice ‍‍‍ | 14 | – | 16 | – | 0 | .467 | 26 | – | 33 | – | 0 | .441 |
| UTSA ‍‍‍ | 13 | – | 16 | – | 0 | .448 | 28 | – | 30 | – | 0 | .483 |
| UAB ‍‍‍ | 12 | – | 18 | – | 0 | .400 | 27 | – | 29 | – | 0 | .482 |
| FIU ‍‍‍ | 12 | – | 18 | – | 0 | .400 | 23 | – | 32 | – | 0 | .418 |
| Charlotte ‍‍‍ | 11 | – | 18 | – | 1 | .383 | 21 | – | 31 | – | 1 | .406 |
| Middle Tennessee ‍‍‍ | 11 | – | 19 | – | 0 | .367 | 18 | – | 37 | – | 0 | .327 |
† – Conference champion ‡ – Tournament champion y – Invited to the NCAA tournament As of June 4, 2019; Rankings from D1Baseball

The 2019 Conference USA baseball tournament was held from May 22 through 26 at MGM Park in Biloxi, Mississippi. The annual tournament determined the conference champion of the Division I Conference USA for college baseball. The tournament champion, Southern Miss, received the league's automatic bid to the 2019 NCAA Division I baseball tournament.

The tournament was established in 1996, Conference USA's first season of play. Rice has won the most championships, with seven. Defending champion Southern Miss has four titles, and UAB and FIU each have one. No other current members have won the event, with the Conference seeing major changes in membership in recent years.

== Seeding and format ==
The top eight finishers from the regular season were seeded one through eight. The tournament used a double elimination format.

== Bracket and results ==
First round
1 | Florida Atlantic | 6
8 | UTSA | 5
4 | Western Kentucky | 7
5 | Old Dominion | 4
5 | Old Dominion | 2
8 | UTSA | 3
3 | Louisiana Tech | 4^{12}
6 | Marshall | 6
2 | Southern Miss | 6
7 | Rice | 4^{10}
3 | Louisiana Tech | 3
7 | Rice | 4

Second round
1 | Florida Atlantic | 6
4 | Western Kentucky | 1
4 | Western Kentucky | 8
8 | UTSA | 15
6 | Marshall | 5
2 | Southern Miss | 10
6 | Marshall | 3
7 | Rice | 6

Semifinals
1 | Florida Atlantic | 11 | –
8 | UTSA | 4 | –
2 | Southern Miss | 6 | –
7 | Rice | 0 | –

Finals
1 | Florida Atlantic | 0
2 | Southern Miss | 4

== Conference championship ==
Conference USA Championship
| (2) Southern Miss Golden Eagles | vs. | (1) Florida Atlantic Owls |

May 26, 2019, 1:06 p.m. (CDT) at MGM Park in Biloxi, Mississippi
| Team | 1 | 2 | 3 | 4 | 5 | 6 | 7 | 8 | 9 | R | H | E |
|---|---|---|---|---|---|---|---|---|---|---|---|---|
| (2) Southern Miss | 0 | 1 | 2 | 0 | 0 | 0 | 1 | 0 | 0 | 4 | 7 | 0 |
| (1) Florida Atlantic | 0 | 0 | 0 | 0 | 0 | 0 | 0 | 0 | 0 | 0 | 10 | 1 |
WP: Stevie Powers (5–4) LP: Eric Keating (1–1) Sv: Hunter Stanley (4); Home runs: USM: None; FAU: None; Attendance: 3,476
