= Matt Wallner =

American baseball player (born 1997)

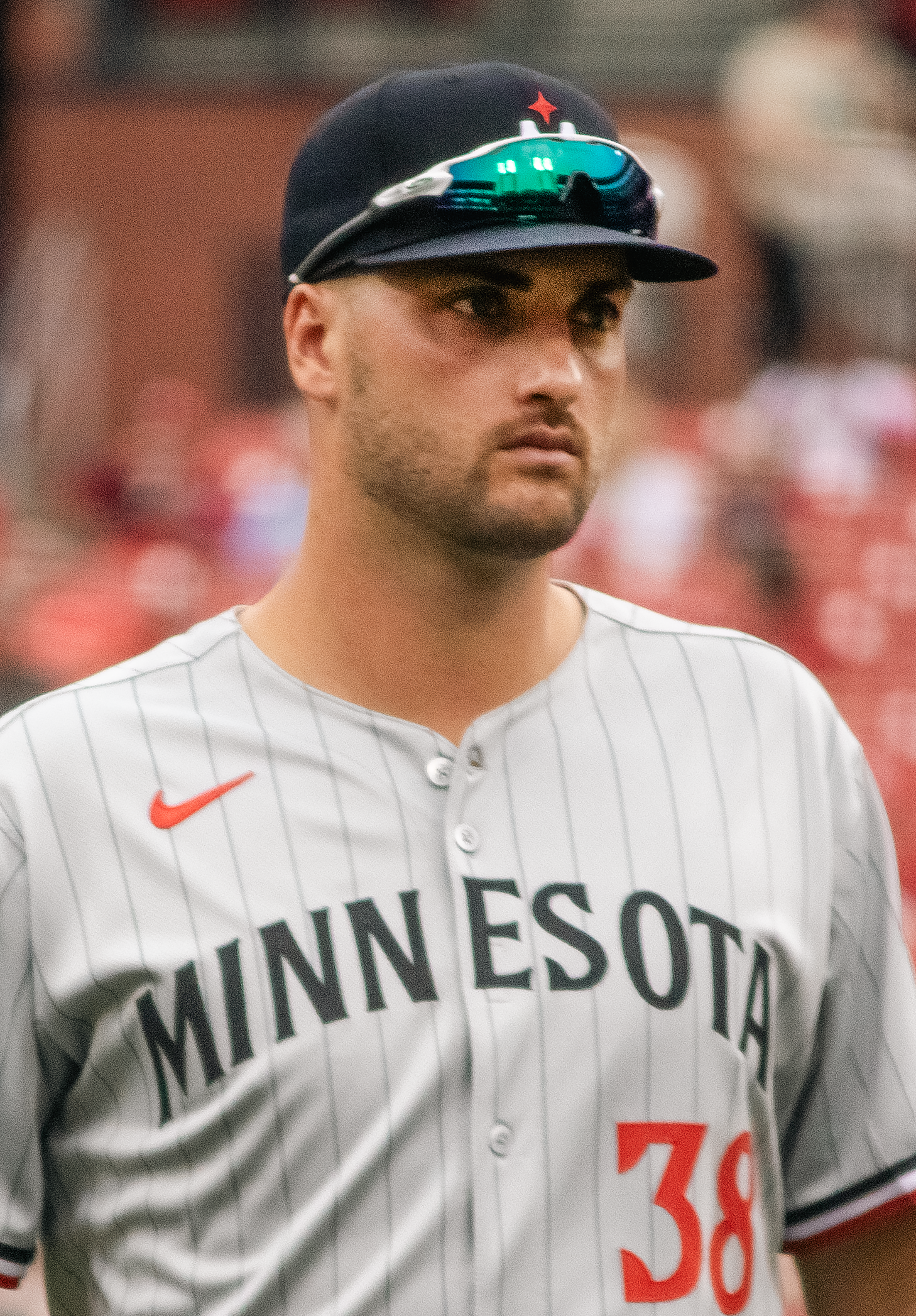
- Wallner with the Minnesota Twins in 2025

Free agent
- Outfielder
- Born: December 12, 1997 (age 28); Forest Lake, Minnesota, U.S.
- Bats: Left Throws: Right

MLB debut
- September 17, 2022, for the Minnesota Twins

MLB statistics (through 2026 season)
- Batting average: .223
- Home runs: 55
- Runs batted in: 138
- Stats at Baseball Reference

Teams
- Minnesota Twins (2022–2026)

Matthew John Wallner (born December 12, 1997) is an American professional baseball outfielder who is a free agent. He has previously played in Major League Baseball (MLB) for the Minnesota Twins.

Born and raised in Forest Lake, Minnesota, Wallner played three years of college baseball at the University of Southern Mississippi. He finished his collegiate career as Southern Mississippi's all-time home run leader before the Minnesota Twins selected him with the 39th overall selection of the 2019 MLB draft. He played in their minor league system for four years before making his MLB debut in 2022.

== Amateur career ==
Wallner played high school baseball at Forest Lake Area High School in Forest Lake, Minnesota. During his senior season, he was named Minnesota's Mr. Baseball after recording a 7-1 pitching record with a 0.95 ERA and batting .382 with ten home runs. He originally committed to play college baseball at the University of North Dakota, but the school dropped their baseball program in 2016, causing Wallner to sign with the University of Southern Mississippi. Following his high school graduation, Wallner was selected by the Minnesota Twins in the 32nd round of the 2016 Major League Baseball draft. However, he did not sign with the organization, instead choosing to honor his commitment to Southern Miss.

In 2017, as a freshman at USM, Wallner hit .336 with 19 home runs and 63 RBI in 66 games. He also appeared in nine games out of the bullpen, compiling a 1.84 ERA. He was named conference Freshman of the Year by Conference USA (C-USA), Baseball America, and D1Baseball.com. He also garnered Freshman Hitter of the Year honors from the National Collegiate Baseball Writers Association. In addition, he was named to the C-USA All-Freshman Team as well as the C-USA Second Team, and was also named a Freshman All-American by multiple outlets including the Collegiate Baseball Newspaper and the National Collegiate Baseball Writers Association.

As a sophomore in 2018, Wallner batted .351 with 16 home runs and 67 RBI in 62 games while recording a 7.98 ERA in 14 2/3 innings. He was named to the C-USA First Team and once again was named an All-American by various publications. Following the season, he played for USA Baseball as a member of the Collegiate National Team. He also played in the Cape Cod Baseball League for the Falmouth Commodores.

Prior to the 2019 season, Wallner was named a preseason All-American by Baseball America, Collegiate Baseball Newspaper, D1Baseball.com and Perfect Game. During the year, he hit his 54th career home run, becoming USM's all-time record holder. Wallner batted .323 with 23 home runs and 60 RBI for the season, earning a spot on the C-USA First Team. He finished his collegiate career with a school record 58 home runs.

== Professional career ==
=== Minor leagues ===
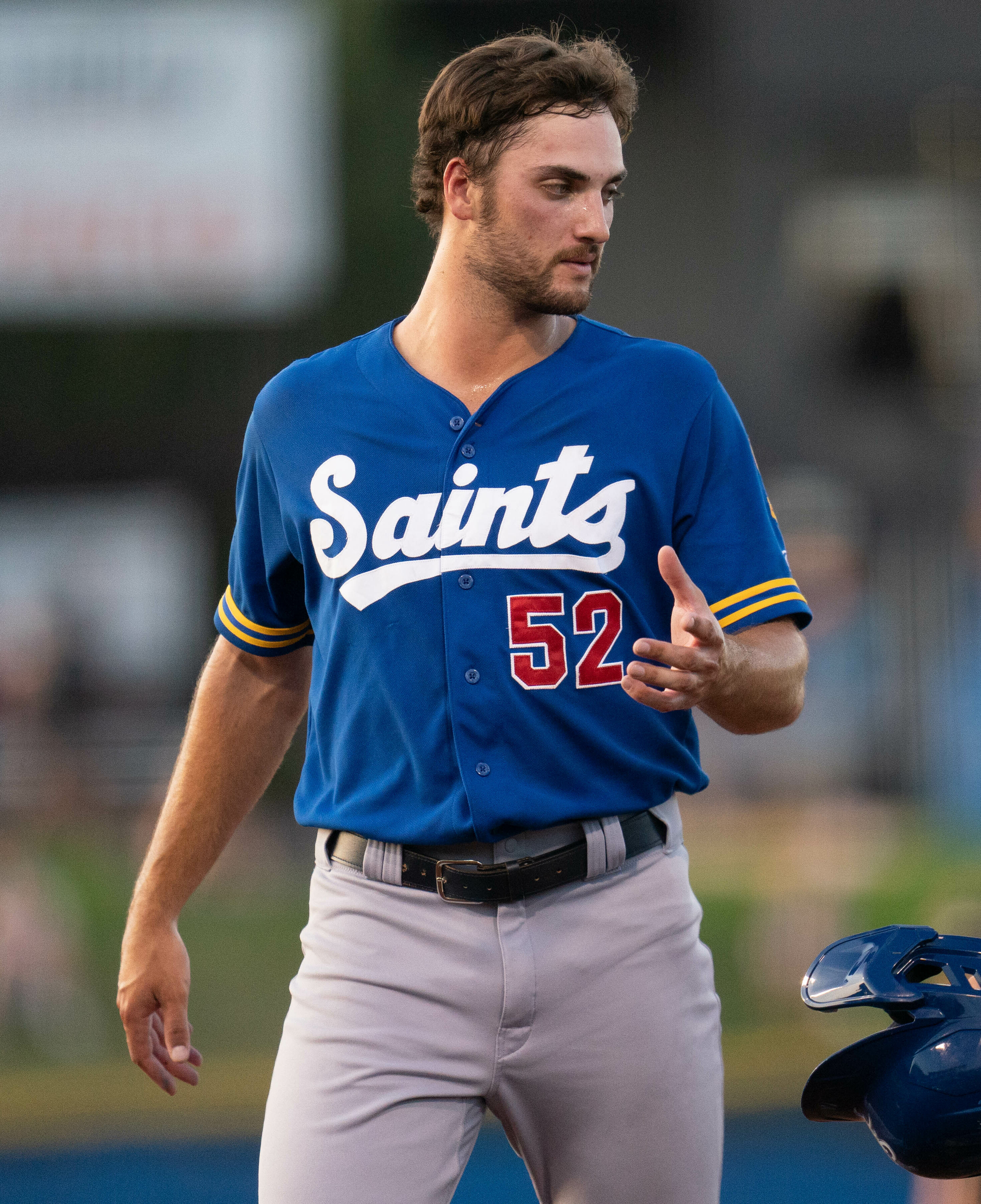
Wallner, with the St. Paul Saints (Triple-A) during a game against the Omaha Storm Chasers on August 6, 2022.

The Minnesota Twins selected Wallner with the 39th overall pick in the 2019 Major League Baseball draft. He signed for $1.8 million, and was assigned to the Elizabethton Twins of the Rookie-level Appalachian League. He was promoted to the Cedar Rapids Kernels of the Single-A Midwest League in August. Over 65 games between the two clubs, Wallner slashed .258/.357/.452 with eight home runs and 34 RBI. He did not play a minor league game in 2020 due to the cancellation of the minor league season caused by the COVID-19 pandemic.

To begin the 2021 season, Wallner returned to Cedar Rapids (now members of the High-A Central). In late May, he was placed on the injured list with a right wrist sprain. It was later revealed that he broke a hamate bone and required surgery. He was activated on July 20. Over 68 games with Cedar Rapids, Wallner slashed .265/.350/.504 with 15 home runs and 47 RBI. He was selected to play in the Arizona Fall League for the Scottsdale Scorpions after the season. Wallner was assigned to the Wichita Wind Surge of the Double-A Texas League to begin the 2022 season. He was selected to the 2022 All-Star Futures Game. In mid-July, he was promoted to the St. Paul Saints of the Triple-A International League. Over 128 games played between Wichita and St. Paul, he slashed .277/.412/.541 in 458 at bats with 27 home runs, 95 RBI, and 32 doubles, and was third in the minor leagues with 97 walks.

=== Major leagues ===
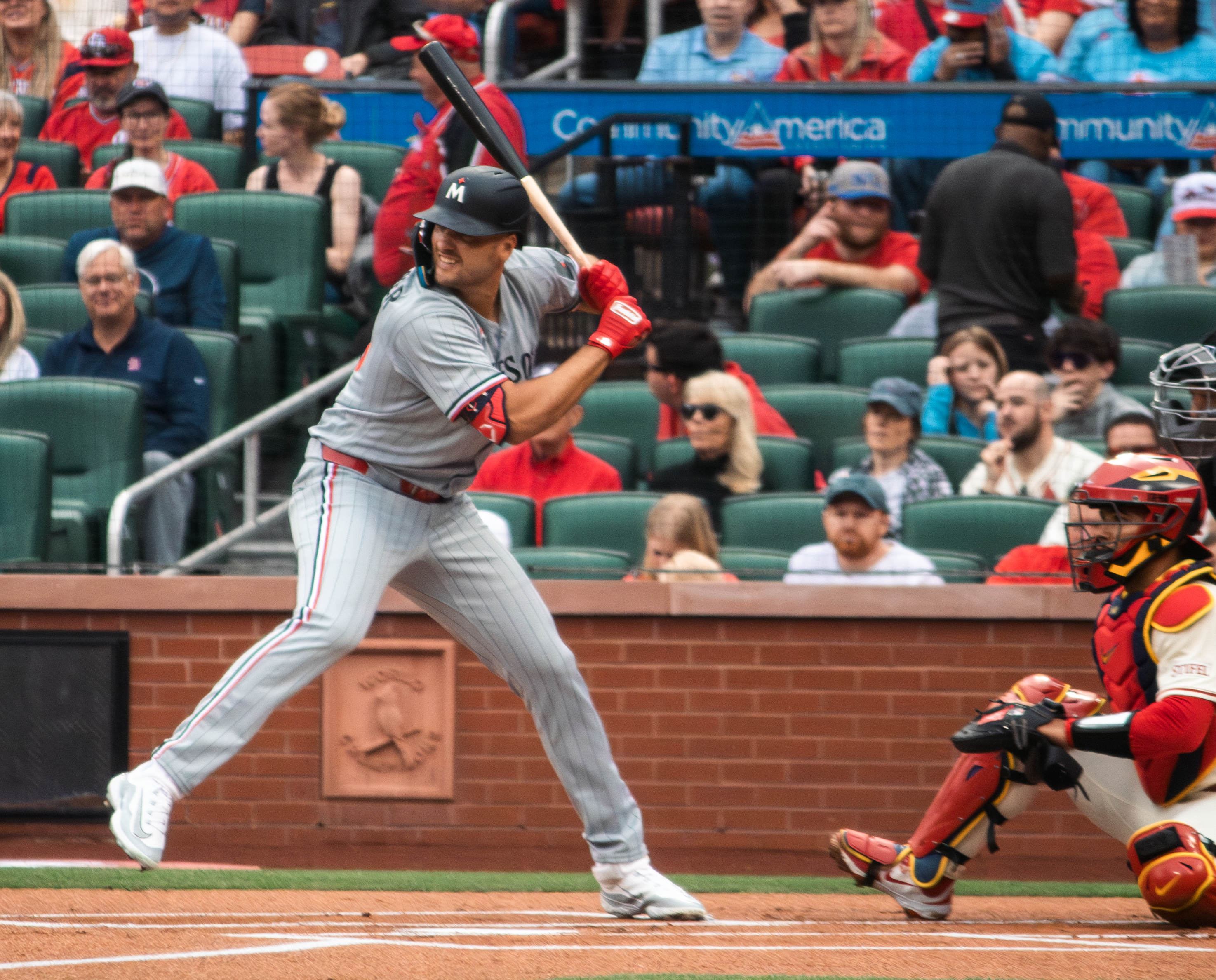
Wallner in St.Louis, 2025.

On September 17, 2022 the Twins selected Wallner's contract and promoted him to the major leagues for the first time. He made his MLB debut that night, hitting a solo home run off of Shane Bieber of the Cleveland Guardians for his first MLB hit. Over 57 at-bats for the Twins in 2022, Wallner hit .228 with two home runs and ten RBI.

Wallner was optioned to Triple-A St. Paul to begin the 2023 season. He was called up to the majors for the first time in early April and went hitless in six games between April 8–15. He was recalled from Triple-A again on May 23 after Trevor Larnach contracted pneumonia. Over 76 games for Minnesota in 2023, Wallner batted .249 with 14 home runs and 41 RBI. With St. Paul, he hit .291 with 11 home runs and 47 RBI across 67 games.

Wallner played in 75 games for Minnesota in 2024 and hit .259 with 13 home runs and 37 RBI, missing the end of the season due to an oblique strain. He also played in 67 games for St. Paul, and batted .259 with 19 home runs and 53 RBI.

Wallner opened the 2025 season as Minnesota's starting right fielder. He missed over a month during the season due a hamstring strain. In 104 appearances for Minnesota, Wallner batted .202/.311/.464 with 22 home runs, 40 RBI, and four stolen bases. On September 19, 2025, Wallner was placed on the injured list due to a right oblique strain, ending his season.

Wallner was the Twins' starting right fielder on Opening Day in 2026. He played in 34 games for the Twins and struggled to a .167 batting average with four home runs and three doubles before he was optioned to St. Paul on May 14. Wallner spent the remainder of the season with St. Paul and batted .254 with 25 home runs and 75 RBI across 94 games. On November 20, 2026, Wallner was non-tendered by the Twins and became a free agent.
