= 1981 College Baseball All-America Team =

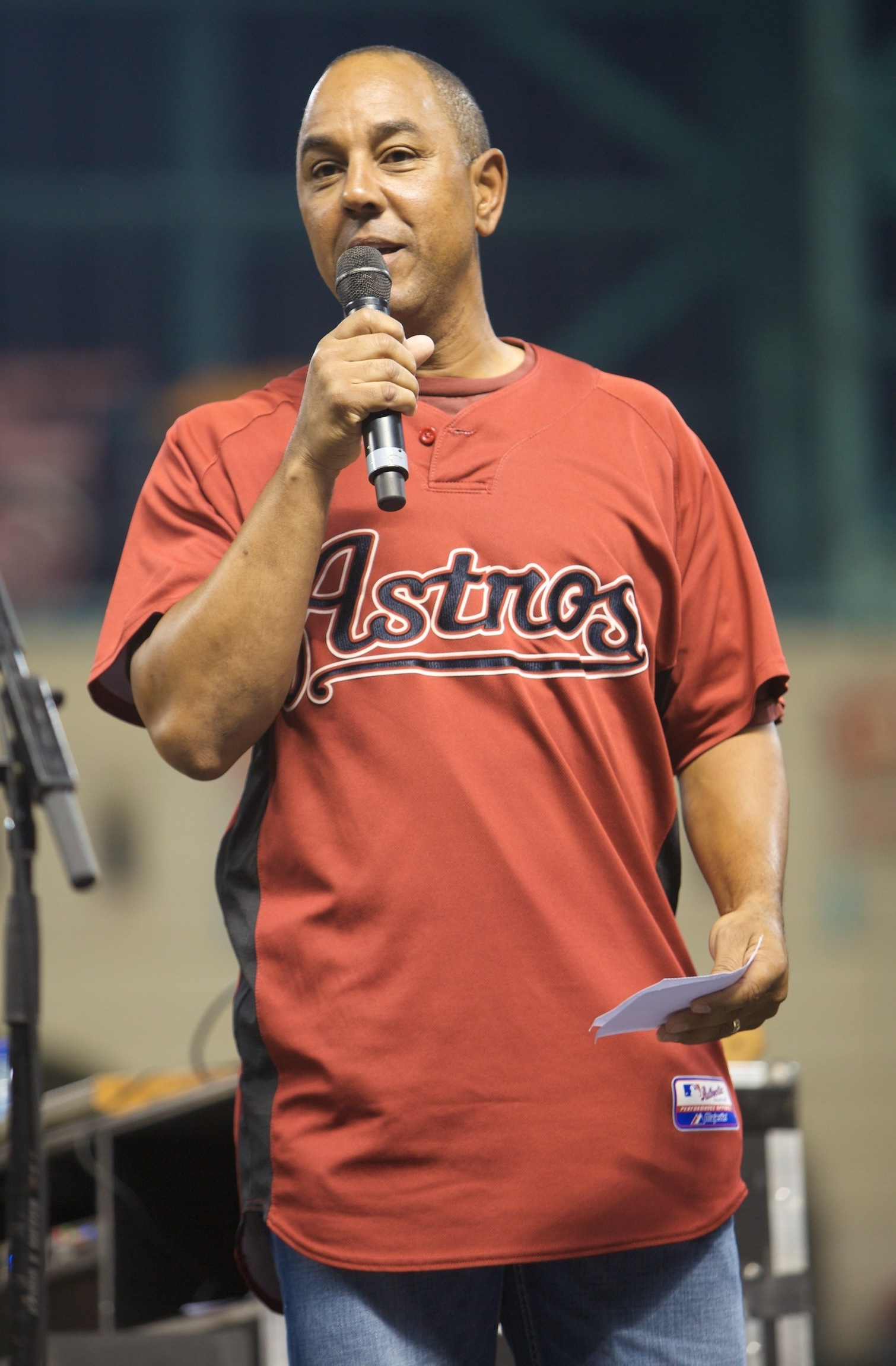
1981 All-Americans included Bobby Meacham.

This is a list of college baseball players named first team All-Americans for the 1981 NCAA Division I baseball season. From 1981 to 1990, there were three generally recognized All-America selectors for baseball: the American Baseball Coaches Association, Baseball America, and The Sporting News. In order to be considered a "consensus" All-American, a player must have been selected by at least two of these.

== Key ==
A	American Baseball Coaches Association
B	Baseball America
S	The Sporting News
	Member of the National College Baseball Hall of Fame
	Consensus All-American – selected by all three organizations
	Consensus All-American – selected by two organizations

== All-Americans ==
Position	Name	School	#	A	B	S	Other awards and honors
Pitcher	Tony Arnold	Texas	2	✓	✓	—	
Pitcher	Kendall Carter	Arizona State	1	—	✓	—	
Pitcher	Neal Heaton	Miami (FL)	3	✓	✓	✓	Baseball America Pitcher of the Year
Pitcher	Mike Moore	Oral Roberts	1	—	—	✓	First overall pick in the 1981 MLB draft
Pitcher	Frank Viola	St. John's	1	—	✓	—	
Catcher	Frank Castro	Miami (FL)	1	—	—	✓	
Catcher	Tom Nieto	Oral Roberts	2	✓	✓	—	
First baseman	Phil Stephenson	Wichita State	3	✓	✓	✓	
Second baseman	Bobby Doerrer	Southern Illinois	1	—	—	✓	
Second baseman	Byron Horn	Eastern Michigan	1	✓	—	—	
Second baseman	Jeff Ronk	California	1	—	✓	—	
Shortstop	Dan Davidsmeier	USC	1	✓	—	—	
Shortstop	Bobby Meacham	San Diego State	2	—	✓	✓	
Third baseman	Tim Pyznarski	Eastern Illinois	1	—	—	✓	
Third baseman	Mike Sodders	Arizona State	2	✓	✓	—	Baseball America Player of the Year
Outfielder	Joe Carter	Wichita State	2	—	✓	✓	The Sporting News Player of the Year
Outfielder	John Christensen	Cal State Fullerton	1	—	✓	—	
Outfielder	Mike Fuentes	Florida State	2	✓	✓	—	Golden Spikes Award
Outfielder	Mark Gillaspie	Mississippi State	1	✓	—	—	
Outfielder	Dave Leeper	USC	1	—	—	✓	
Outfielder	Kevin McReynolds	Arkansas	1	—	—	✓	
Outfielder	Kevin Romine	Arizona State	1	✓	—	—	
Designated hitter	Jeff Ledbetter	Florida State	1	—	—	✓	
Designated hitter	Phil Strom	Utah	1	✓	—	—	
Designated hitter	Franklin Stubbs	Virginia Tech	1	—	✓	—	

== See also ==
- List of college baseball awards
