= 1981 NCAA Division I baseball season =

Baseball season

- Number of teams: 248

NCAA tournament

College World Series
- Champions: Arizona State (5th title)
- Runners-up: Oklahoma State (9th CWS Appearance)
- Winning coach: Jim Brock (2nd title)
- MOP: Stan Holmes (Arizona State)

Seasons
- ← 1980 1982 →

The 1981 NCAA Division I baseball season, play of college baseball in the United States organized by the National Collegiate Athletic Association (NCAA) began in the spring of 1981. The season progressed through the regular season and concluded with the 1981 College World Series. The College World Series, held for the thirty fifth time in 1981, consisted of one team from each of eight regional competitions and was held in Omaha, Nebraska at Johnny Rosenblatt Stadium as a double-elimination tournament. Arizona State claimed the championship for the fifth time.

== Conference winners ==
This is a partial list of conference champions from the 1981 season. The NCAA sponsored regional competitions to determine the College World Series participants. Seven regionals of four teams and one of six each competed in double-elimination tournaments, with the winners advancing to Omaha. 21 teams earned automatic bids by winning their conference championship while 13 teams earned at-large selections.

Conference	Regular season winner	Conference tournament	Tournament venue • city	Tournament winner
Atlantic Coast Conference	Clemson/NC State	1981 Atlantic Coast Conference baseball tournament	Boshamer Stadium • Chapel Hill, NC	Clemson
Big Eight Conference	Missouri	1981 Big Eight Conference baseball tournament	All Sports Stadium • Oklahoma City, OK	Oklahoma State
Big Ten Conference	East - Michigan; West - Minnesota	1981 Big Ten Conference baseball tournament	Ray Fisher Stadium • Ann Arbor, MI	Michigan
EIBL	Yale	No tournament		
Mid-American Conference	Central Michigan	1981 Mid-American Conference baseball tournament	Bill Theunissen Stadium • Mount Pleasant, MI	Eastern Michigan
Midwestern City Conference	North - Xavier; South - Oral Roberts	1981 Midwestern City Conference baseball tournament	Tulsa, OK	Oral Roberts
Pacific-10 Conference	North - Washington; South - Arizona State	No tournament		
Southeastern Conference	East - Florida; West - Mississippi State/Alabama	1981 Southeastern Conference baseball tournament	Dudy Noble Field • Starkville, MS	Florida
Southern Conference	East Tennessee State/Marshall/Western Carolina	No tournament		
Southwest Conference	Texas	1981 Southwest Conference baseball tournament	Disch–Falk Field • Austin, TX	Texas
Trans America Athletic Conference	East - Georgia Southern; West - Hardin–Simmons	1981 Trans America Athletic Conference baseball tournament	Hunter Field • Abilene, TX	Mercer

== Conference standings ==
The following is an incomplete list of conference standings:

1981 Atlantic Coast Conference baseball standings
	Conf.				Overall
Team	W		L	PCT	W		L	PCT
Clemson ‍†‍‡‍^{y}	10	–	4	.714	34	–	24	.586
NC State ‍†‍‍	10	–	4	.714	33	–	12	.733
Maryland ‍‍‍	7	–	3	.700	23	–	13	.639
Virginia ‍‍‍	8	–	5	.615	28	–	20	.583
Duke ‍‍‍	6	–	6	.500	29	–	10	.744
North Carolina ‍‍‍	6	–	7	.462	38	–	15	.717
Wake Forest ‍‍‍	3	–	9	.250	17	–	13	.567
Georgia Tech ‍‍‍	1	–	13	.071	14	–	24	.368
† – Conference champion ‡ – Tournament champion y – Invited to the NCAA tournament As of June 30, 1981; Rankings from Collegiate Baseball

1981 Big Eight Conference baseball standings
	Conf.				Overall
Team	W		L	PCT	W		L	PCT
No. 30 Missouri ‍†‍‍^{y}	17	–	6	.739	43	–	16	.729
No. 2 Oklahoma State ‍‍‡‍^{y}	12	–	6	.667	52	–	17	.754
Kansas ‍‍‍	12	–	11	.522	32	–	19	.627
Nebraska ‍‍‍	11	–	11	.500	42	–	22	.656
Oklahoma ‍‍‍	11	–	13	.458	40	–	15	.727
Kansas State ‍‍‍	8	–	12	.400	34	–	21	.618
Iowa State ‍‍‍	6	–	18	.250	34	–	22	.607
† – Conference champion ‡ – Tournament champion y – Invited to the NCAA tournament As of June 30, 1981; Rankings from Collegiate Baseball

1981 Big Ten Conference baseball standings
	Conf.				Overall
Team	W		L	PCT	W		L	PCT
East
Michigan ^{x}‍‍‡‍^{y}	10	–	4	.714	41	–	20	.672
Purdue ‍‍‍	8	–	6	.571	34	–	30	.531
Ohio State ‍‍‍	7	–	9	.438	34	–	18	.654
Michigan State ‍‍‍	6	–	8	.429	23	–	28	.451
Indiana ‍‍‍	5	–	9	.357	23	–	25	.479
West
Minnesota ^{x}‍‍‍	13	–	3	.813	37	–	16	.698
Illinois ‍‍‍	11	–	3	.786	35	–	26	.574
Iowa ‍‍‍	8	–	6	.571	44	–	21	.677
Wisconsin ‍‍‍	3	–	13	.188	24	–	36	.400
Northwestern ‍‍‍	3	–	13	.188	17	–	33	.340
x – Division champion ‡ – Tournament champion y – Invited to the NCAA tournament As of June 30, 1981; Rankings from Collegiate Baseball

1981 Eastern 8 Conference baseball standings
	Conf.						Overall
Team	W		L		T	PCT	W		L		T	PCT
East
Rutgers ^{x}‍‍‡‍	5	–	3	–	0	.625	18	–	19	–	1	.487
UMass ‍‍‍	4	–	4	–	0	.500	22	–	17	–	0	.564
Rhode Island ‍‍‍	3	–	5	–	0	.375	14	–	18	–	0	.438
West
West Virginia ^{x}‍‍‍	6	–	2	–	0	.750	17	–	18	–	0	.486
Pittsburgh ‍‍‍	7	–	3	–	0	.700	25	–	8	–	0	.758
George Washington ‍‍‍	3	–	3	–	0	.500	18	–	20	–	0	.474
Duquesne ‍‍‍	0	–	8	–	0	.000	13	–	12	–	0	.520
x – Division champion ‡ – Championship Series champion As of June 30, 1981; Rankings from Collegiate Baseball

1981 Mid-American Conference baseball standings
	Conf.						Overall
Team	W		L		T	PCT	W		L		T	PCT
Central Michigan ‍†‍‍	13	–	3	–	0	.813	37	–	13	–	0	.740
Western Michigan ‍‍‍	14	–	3	–	1	.806	32	–	21	–	1	.602
Miami ‍‍‍	12	–	5	–	1	.694	22	–	27	–	1	.450
Eastern Michigan ‍‍‡‍^{y}	9	–	7	–	0	.563	37	–	29	–	0	.561
Toledo ‍‍‍	8	–	9	–	0	.471	30	–	20	–	0	.600
Northern Illinois ‍‍‍	6	–	10	–	2	.389	19	–	26	–	2	.426
Kent State ‍‍‍	5	–	8	–	0	.385	13	–	18	–	1	.422
Bowling Green ‍‍‍	5	–	8	–	0	.385	13	–	18	–	1	.422
Ohio ‍‍‍	5	–	13	–	0	.278	12	–	34	–	0	.261
Ball State ‍‍‍	4	–	12	–	0	.250	18	–	22	–	0	.450
† – Conference champion ‡ – Tournament champion y – Invited to the NCAA tournament As of June 30, 1981; Rankings from Collegiate Baseball

1981 Pacific-10 Conference baseball standings
	Conf.				Overall
Team	W		L	PCT	W		L	PCT
Northern
Washington ^{x}‍‍‍	12	–	6	.667	34	–	18	.654
Oregon State ‍‍‍	11	–	7	.611	29	–	14	.674
Washington State ‍‍‍	11	–	7	.611	27	–	25	.519
Oregon ‍‍‍	2	–	16	.111	16	–	21	.432
Southern
No. 1 Arizona State ^{x}‍‍‍^{y}	26	–	4	.867	55	–	13	.809
Stanford ‍‍‍^{y}	16	–	14	.533	43	–	22	.662
Southern California ‍‍‍	15	–	15	.500	34	–	24	.586
Arizona ‍‍‍	14	–	16	.467	30	–	22	.577
California ‍‍‍	12	–	18	.400	31	–	31	.500
UCLA ‍‍‍	7	–	23	.233	21	–	35	.375
x – Division champion y – Invited to the NCAA tournament As of June 30, 1981; Rankings from Collegiate Baseball

1981 Southeastern Conference baseball standings
	Conf.				Overall
Team	W		L	PCT	W		L	PCT
Eastern Division
No. 15 Florida ^{x}‍‍‡‍^{y}	16	–	7	.696	42	–	17	.712
Kentucky ‍‍‍	13	–	9	.591	39	–	16	.709
Tennessee ‍‍‍	10	–	13	.435	22	–	27	.449
Vanderbilt ‍‍‍	9	–	12	.429	26	–	25	.510
Georgia ‍‍‍	8	–	15	.348	23	–	23	.500
Western Division
No. 6 Mississippi State ^{x}‍‍‍^{y}	17	–	6	.739	46	–	17	.730
Alabama ^{x}‍‍‍	17	–	6	.739	41	–	15	.732
Ole Miss ‍‍‍	8	–	14	.364	24	–	24	.500
LSU ‍‍‍	7	–	14	.333	23	–	30	.434
Auburn ‍‍‍	7	–	16	.304	27	–	27	.500
x – Division champion ‡ – Tournament champion y – Invited to the NCAA tournament As of June 30, 1981; Rankings from Collegiate Baseball

1981 Southern Conference baseball standings
	Conf.				Overall
Team	W		L	PCT	W		L	PCT
No. 17 East Tennessee State ‍†‍‍^{y}	12	–	4	.750	44	–	17	.721
Western Carolina ‍‍‍	12	–	4	.750	25	–	14	.641
Marshall ‍‍‍	12	–	4	.750	22	–	17	.564
The Citadel ‍‍‍	11	–	5	.688	31	–	13	.705
Appalachian State ‍‍‍	8	–	8	.500	35	–	17	.673
Davidson ‍‍‍	7	–	9	.438	18	–	26	.409
Chattanooga ‍‍‍	6	–	10	.375	28	–	24	.538
Furman ‍‍‍	4	–	12	.250	11	–	33	.250
VMI ‍‍‍	0	–	16	.000	3	–	37	.075
y – Invited to the NCAA tournament As of June 30, 1981; Rankings from Collegiate Baseball

1981 Southwest Conference baseball standings
	Conf.						Overall
Team	W		L		T	PCT	W		L		T	PCT
No. 3 Texas ‍†‍‡‍^{y}	16	–	5	–	1	.750	61	–	11	–	0	.847
Arkansas ‍‍‍	12	–	9	–	0	.571	31	–	21	–	0	.596
Houston ‍‍‍	11	–	9	–	0	.550	32	–	20	–	0	.615
Rice ‍‍‍	11	–	10	–	0	.524	34	–	23	–	0	.596
Texas A&M ‍‍‍	10	–	10	–	0	.500	35	–	16	–	0	.686
TCU ‍‍‍	9	–	12	–	0	.429	27	–	19	–	0	.587
Texas Tech ‍‍‍	8	–	13	–	0	.381	26	–	21	–	0	.553
Baylor ‍‍‍	6	–	15	–	0	.286	21	–	24	–	0	.467
† – Conference champion ‡ – Tournament champion y – Invited to the NCAA tournament As of June 30, 1981; Rankings from Collegiate Baseball

1981 Trans America Athletic Conference baseball standings
	Conf.						Overall
Team	W		L		T	PCT	W		L		T	PCT
East
Georgia Southern ^{x}‍†‍‍	9	–	0	–	0	1.000	41	–	22	–	1	.648
Mercer ‍‍‡‍	3	–	4	–	0	.429	39	–	12	–	1	.760
Arkansas–Little Rock ‍‍‍	0	–	6	–	0	.000	22	–	25	–	0	.468
West
Hardin–Simmons ^{x}‍‍‍	8	–	4	–	0	.667	20	–	28	–	0	.417
Centenary ‍‍‍	8	–	4	–	0	.667	33	–	29	–	0	.532
Northeast Louisiana ‍‍‍	6	–	6	–	0	.500	33	–	22	–	0	.600
Northwestern State ‍‍‍	2	–	10	–	0	.167	16	–	42	–	0	.276
x – Division champion † – Conference champion ‡ – Tournament champion As of June 30, 1981; Rankings from Collegiate Baseball

== College World Series ==
The 1981 season marked the thirty fifth NCAA baseball tournament, which culminated with the eight team College World Series. The College World Series was held in Omaha, Nebraska. The eight teams played a double-elimination format, with Arizona State claiming their fifth championship with a 7–4 win over Oklahoma State in the final.

Upper round 1
Mississippi State	4
Michigan	1
Arizona State	11
Texas	2
Oklahoma State	8^{10}
South Carolina	5
Miami (FL)	6
Maine	1

Upper round 2
Mississippi State	3
Arizona State	4
Oklahoma State	12
Miami (FL)	6
Lower round 1
Michigan	5
Texas	6
South Carolina	12
Maine	7

Upper final
Arizona State	10
Oklahoma State	11^{13}
Lower round 2
Miami (FL)	4
Texas	5
Mississippi State	5
South Carolina	6

Semifinals
Oklahoma State	8
Texas	15^{13}
Arizona State	10
South Carolina	7

Preliminary final
Texas	3
Arizona State	12

Final
Oklahoma State	4
Arizona State	7
