= 1981 Southeastern Conference baseball tournament =

American collegiate baseball tournament

- Teams: 4
- Format: Four-team double elimination tournament
- Finals site: Dudy Noble Field; Starkville, Mississippi
- Champions: Florida (1st title)
- Winning coach: Jay Bergman (1st title)
- MVP: Jeff Keener (Kentucky)

1981 Southeastern Conference baseball standings
	Conf.				Overall
Team	W		L	PCT	W		L	PCT
Eastern Division
No. 15 Florida ^{x}‍‍‡‍^{y}	16	–	7	.696	42	–	17	.712
Kentucky ‍‍‍	13	–	9	.591	39	–	16	.709
Tennessee ‍‍‍	10	–	13	.435	22	–	27	.449
Vanderbilt ‍‍‍	9	–	12	.429	26	–	25	.510
Georgia ‍‍‍	8	–	15	.348	23	–	23	.500
Western Division
No. 6 Mississippi State ^{x}‍‍‍^{y}	17	–	6	.739	46	–	17	.730
Alabama ^{x}‍‍‍	17	–	6	.739	41	–	15	.732
Ole Miss ‍‍‍	8	–	14	.364	24	–	24	.500
LSU ‍‍‍	7	–	14	.333	23	–	30	.434
Auburn ‍‍‍	7	–	16	.304	27	–	27	.500
x – Division champion ‡ – Tournament champion y – Invited to the NCAA tournament As of June 30, 1981; Rankings from Collegiate Baseball

The 1981 Southeastern Conference baseball tournament was held at Dudy Noble Field in Starkville, Mississippi, from May 15 through 17. Florida won the tournament and earned the Southeastern Conference's automatic bid to the 1981 NCAA tournament.

== Regular season results ==
Team	W	L	Pct	GB	Seed
Eastern Division
Florida	16	7	.696	—	3
Kentucky	13	9	.591	2.5	4
Tennessee	10	13	.435	6	—
Vanderbilt	9	12	.429	6	—
Georgia	8	15	.348	8	—

Team	W	L	Pct	GB	Seed
Western Division
Mississippi State	17	6	.739	—	1
Alabama	17	6	.739	—	2
Ole Miss	8	14	.364	8.5	—
LSU	7	14	.333	9	—
Auburn	7	16	.304	10	—

== Tournament ==
First round
3	Florida	3
2	Alabama	2
1	Mississippi State	3
4	Kentucky	2
Lower round 1
2	Alabama	2
4	Kentucky	3

Semi-finals
3	Florida	8
1	Mississippi State	3
Lower final
4	Kentucky	3
1	Mississippi State	2

Finals
3	Florida	11	–
4	Kentucky	5	–

== All-Tournament Team ==
Position	Player	School
1B	Dave Falcone	Florida
2B	Danny Potosky	Kentucky
3B	Lou Sottile	Mississippi State
SS	Steve Lombardozzi	Florida
C	Greg Ryle	Kentucky
OF	Mark Gillaspie	Mississippi State
OF	Glenn Carpenter	Florida
OF	Mike Botkin	Kentucky
UT	Mike Henley	Florida
UT	Dave Klipstein	Mississippi State
P	Jeff Keener	Kentucky
P	Don Mundie	Mississippi State
P	Randy O'Neil	Florida
MVP	Jeff Keener	Kentucky

== See also ==
- College World Series
- NCAA Division I Baseball Championship
- Southeastern Conference baseball tournament
