= 1981 Michigan Wolverines baseball team =

American college baseball season

1981 Michigan Wolverines baseball

Big Ten Conference East Division Big Ten Conference Tournament

College World Series, T-7th
- Conference: Big Ten Conference
- East

Ranking
- Coaches: No. 8
- CB: No. 8
- Record: 41–20 (10–4 Big Ten)
- Head coach: Bud Middaugh (2nd season)
- Assistant coaches: Danny Hall (2nd season); Terry Hunter
- MVP: Gerry Hool
- Home stadium: Ray Fisher Stadium

1981 Big Ten Conference baseball standings
| | Conf. | | | | Overall |
| Team | W | | L | PCT | W | | L | PCT |
|---|---|---|---|---|---|---|---|---|
East
| Michigan ^{x}‍‍‡‍^{y} | 10 | – | 4 | .714 | 41 | – | 20 | .672 |
| Purdue ‍‍‍ | 8 | – | 6 | .571 | 34 | – | 30 | .531 |
| Ohio State ‍‍‍ | 7 | – | 9 | .438 | 34 | – | 18 | .654 |
| Michigan State ‍‍‍ | 6 | – | 8 | .429 | 23 | – | 28 | .451 |
| Indiana ‍‍‍ | 5 | – | 9 | .357 | 23 | – | 25 | .479 |
West
| Minnesota ^{x}‍‍‍ | 13 | – | 3 | .813 | 37 | – | 16 | .698 |
| Illinois ‍‍‍ | 11 | – | 3 | .786 | 35 | – | 26 | .574 |
| Iowa ‍‍‍ | 8 | – | 6 | .571 | 44 | – | 21 | .677 |
| Wisconsin ‍‍‍ | 3 | – | 13 | .188 | 24 | – | 36 | .400 |
| Northwestern ‍‍‍ | 3 | – | 13 | .188 | 17 | – | 33 | .340 |
x – Division champion ‡ – Tournament champion y – Invited to the NCAA tournament As of June 30, 1981; Rankings from Collegiate Baseball

The 1981 Michigan Wolverines baseball team represented the University of Michigan in the 1981 NCAA Division I baseball season. The head coach was Bud Middaugh, serving his 2nd year. The Wolverines finished the season in 7th place in the 1981 College World Series.

== Roster ==
1981 Michigan Wolverines baseball team
Players
Coaches

| # | Pos. | Name | B/T | Height | Weight | Year | Home town |
|---|---|---|---|---|---|---|---|
| | | Thomas Antle | / | — | — |
| 15 | | Richard Bair | / | — | — | Fr |
| | | Clyde Barnhart | / | — | — |
| 28 | | Jim Bartlett | / | — | — |
| 6 | RHP | Mark Clinton | /R | 6 ft 1 in (1.85 m) | 185 lb (84 kg) | Sr |
| | | F. W. Davenport | / | — | — |
| 18 | RHP | Scot Elam | /R | 6 ft 4 in (1.93 m) | 210 lb (95 kg) |
| 14 | | Fred Erdmann | / | — | — | So |
| 9 | INF | Tony Evans | R/R | 6 ft 0 in (1.83 m) | 175 lb (79 kg) | So |
| 8 | | Chuck Froning | / | — | — | Fr |
| | | James Gallagher | / | — | — | Jr |
| | | William Harvey | / | — | — |
| 23 | C | Gerald Hool | R/R | — | — | Sr |
| 22 | INF | Jeffery Jacobson | R/R | 6 ft 1 in (1.85 m) | 185 lb (84 kg) | So |
| 25 | RHP | Dave Kopf | /R | 6 ft 5 in (1.96 m) | 210 lb (95 kg) | | Royal Oak, Michigan |
| | | Timothy Miller | / | — | — |
| | | Chester Morrison | / | — | — | Fr |
| | | David Nuss | / | — | — |
| 16 | RHP | Steve Ontiveros | R/R | 6 ft 0 in (1.83 m) | 180 lb (82 kg) | So | Tularosa, New Mexico |
| 19 | OF | Jim Paciorek | R/R | 6 ft 3 in (1.91 m) | 203 lb (92 kg) | Jr | Detroit, Michigan |
| | | Arthur Packard | / | — | — |
| 31 | | Vic Ray | / | — | — |
| | | J. H. Rollins | / | — | — |
| | | Edward Ruzicka | / | — | — |
| 7 | INF | Chris Sabo | R/R | 5 ft 11 in (1.8 m) | 185 lb (84 kg) | Fr | Detroit, Michigan |
| 4 | | Greg Schulte | / | — | — |
| 30 | | Bill Shuta | / | — | — |
| 2 | | David Stober | / | — | — |
| 26 | RHP | Richard Stoll | R/R | 5 ft 11 in (1.8 m) | 182 lb (83 kg) |
| 3 | | Daniel Sygar | / | — | — | So |
| 24 | LHP | Gary Wayne | L/L | 6 ft 3 in (1.91 m) | 185 lb (84 kg) | Fr | Dearborn, Michigan |
| 5 | | Randal Wroten | / | — | — | Sr |
| 10 | C | John Young | L/R | 6 ft 4 in (1.93 m) | 205 lb (93 kg) | Jr | Sterling Heights, Michigan |

Head coach

27 Bud Middaugh

Assistant coach(es)

17 Danny Hall
41 Terry Hunter

Legend

- (C) Team captain
- (S) Suspended
- (I) Ineligible
- Injured
- Current redshirt

== Schedule ==
1981 Michigan Wolverines baseball game log
Regular season
March (8–7)

| # | Date | Opponent | Site/stadium | Score | Overall record | Big Ten record |
|---|---|---|---|---|---|---|
| 1 | March 20 | vs New York Tech | Unknown • Miami, Florida | 9–3 | 1–0 | 0–0 |
| 2 | March 20 | vs New York Tech | Unknown • Miami, Florida | 0–1 | 1–1 | 0–0 |
| 3 | March 21 | vs Maine | Unknown • Miami, Florida | 15–6 | 2–1 | 0–0 |
| 4 | March 22 | at FIU | Unknown • Miami, Florida | 9–12 | 2–2 | 0–0 |
| 5 | March 23 | vs Bowling Green | Unknown • Miami, Florida | 8–3 | 3–2 | 0–0 |
| 6 | March 23 | vs Maine | Unknown • Miami, Florida | 10–15 | 3–3 | 0–0 |
| 7 | March 24 | at Miami (FL) | Mark Light Field • Coral Gables, Florida | 2–3 | 3–4 | 0–0 |
| 8 | March 24 | vs Glassboro State | Mark Light Field • Coral Gables, Florida | 8–0 | 4–4 | 0–0 |
| 9 | March 25 | vs Trenton State | Mark Light Field • Coral Gables, Florida | 9–2 | 5–4 | 0–0 |
| 10 | March 27 | vs Glassboro State | Mark Light Field • Coral Gables, Florida | 5–7 | 5–5 | 0–0 |
| 11 | March 27 | at Miami (FL) | Mark Light Field • Coral Gables, Florida | 3–12 | 5–6 | 0–0 |
| 12 | March 28 | vs FIU | Mark Light Field • Coral Gables, Florida | 11–6 | 6–6 | 0–0 |
| 13 | March 28 | at Miami (FL) | Mark Light Field • Coral Gables, Florida | 3–10 | 6–7 | 0–0 |
| 14 | March 31 | Grand Valley State | Ray Fisher Stadium • Ann Arbor, Michigan | 12–2 | 7–7 | 0–0 |
| 15 | March 31 | Grand Valley State | Ray Fisher Stadium • Ann Arbor, Michigan | 10–4 | 8–7 | 0–0 |

April (20–5)

| # | Date | Opponent | Site/stadium | Score | Overall record | Big Ten record |
|---|---|---|---|---|---|---|
| 16 | April 1 | Eastern Michigan | Unknown • Unknown, Michigan | 5–3 | 9–7 | 0–0 |
| 17 | April 1 | Eastern Michigan | Unknown • Unknown, Michigan | 8–7 | 10–7 | 0–0 |
| 18 | April 3 | at Miami (OH) | Unknown • Oxford, Ohio | 2–3 | 10–8 | 0–0 |
| 19 | April 3 | at Miami (OH) | Unknown • Oxford, Ohio | 8–3 | 11–8 | 0–0 |
| 20 | April 7 | Aquinas | Ray Fisher Stadium • Ann Arbor, Michigan | 2–1 | 12–8 | 0–0 |
| 21 | April 8 | vs Western Michigan | Unknown • Unknown, Michigan | 3–4 | 12–9 | 0–0 |
| 22 | April 8 | vs Western Michigan | Unknown • Unknown, Michigan | 5–6 | 12–10 | 0–0 |
| 23 | April 11 | at Ohio State | Trautman Field • Columbus, Ohio | 7–2 | 13–10 | 1–0 |
| 24 | April 11 | at Ohio State | Trautman Field • Columbus, Ohio | 3–7 | 13–11 | 1–1 |
| 25 | April 12 | at Ohio State | Trautman Field • Columbus, Ohio | 8–3 | 14–11 | 2–1 |
| 26 | April 12 | at Ohio State | Trautman Field • Columbus, Ohio | 4–2 | 15–11 | 3–1 |
| 27 | April 14 | Wayne State | Ray Fisher Stadium • Ann Arbor, Michigan | 6–5 | 16–11 | 3–1 |
| 28 | April 15 | vs Western Michigan | Unknown • Unknown, Michigan | 5–2 | 17–11 | 3–1 |
| 29 | April 15 | vs Western Michigan | Unknown • Unknown, Michigan | 8–2 | 18–11 | 3–1 |
| 30 | April 18 | Indiana | Ray Fisher Stadium • Ann Arbor, Michigan | 6–2 | 19–11 | 4–1 |
| 31 | April 18 | Indiana | Ray Fisher Stadium • Ann Arbor, Michigan | 8–1 | 20–11 | 5–1 |
| 32 | April 19 | Indiana | Ray Fisher Stadium • Ann Arbor, Michigan | 3–4 | 20–12 | 5–2 |
| 33 | April 19 | Indiana | Ray Fisher Stadium • Ann Arbor, Michigan | 9–1 | 21–12 | 6–2 |
| 34 | April 21 | Cleveland State | Ray Fisher Stadium • Ann Arbor, Michigan | 4–2 | 22–12 | 6–2 |
| 35 | April 22 | Cleveland State | Ray Fisher Stadium • Ann Arbor, Michigan | 2–1 | 23–12 | 6–2 |
| 36 | April 22 | Cleveland State | Ray Fisher Stadium • Ann Arbor, Michigan | 9–1 | 24–12 | 6–2 |
| 37 | April 23 | Detroit | Ray Fisher Stadium • Ann Arbor, Michigan | 2–0 | 25–12 | 6–2 |
| 38 | April 23 | Detroit | Ray Fisher Stadium • Ann Arbor, Michigan | 11–0 | 26–12 | 6–2 |
| 39 | April 25 | vs Ferris State | Unknown • Unknown, Michigan | 3–2 | 27–12 | 6–2 |
| 40 | April 25 | vs Ferris State | Unknown • Unknown, Michigan | 6–2 | 28–12 | 6–2 |

May (6–5)

| # | Date | Opponent | Site/stadium | Score | Overall record | Big Ten record |
|---|---|---|---|---|---|---|
| 41 | May 2 | Purdue | Ray Fisher Stadium • Ann Arbor, Michigan | 5–1 | 29–12 | 7–2 |
| 42 | May 2 | Purdue | Ray Fisher Stadium • Ann Arbor, Michigan | 5–1 | 30–12 | 8–2 |
| 43 | May 3 | Purdue | Ray Fisher Stadium • Ann Arbor, Michigan | 1–3 | 30–13 | 8–3 |
| 44 | May 3 | Purdue | Ray Fisher Stadium • Ann Arbor, Michigan | 5–2 | 31–13 | 9–3 |
| 45 | May 5 | vs Toledo | Unknown • Unknown | 2–3 | 31–14 | 9–3 |
| 46 | May 6 | vs Eastern Michigan | Unknown • Unknown, Michigan | 3–7 | 31–15 | 9–3 |
| 47 | May 6 | vs Eastern Michigan | Unknown • Unknown, Michigan | 7–2 | 32–15 | 9–3 |
| 48 | May 9 | at Michigan State | John H. Kobs Field • East Lansing, Michigan | 7–2 | 33–15 | 10–3 |
| 49 | May 9 | at Michigan State | John H. Kobs Field • East Lansing, Michigan | 6–8 | 33–16 | 10–4 |
| 50 | May 12 | vs Wayne State | Unknown • Unknown, Michigan | 5–3 | 34–16 | 10–4 |
| 51 | May 12 | vs Wayne State | Unknown • Unknown, Michigan | 3–5 | 34–17 | 10–4 |

Postseason
Big Ten Tournament (3–0)

| # | Date | Opponent | Site/stadium | Score | Overall record | Big Ten record |
|---|---|---|---|---|---|---|
| 52 | May 15 | Illinois | Ray Fisher Stadium • Ann Arbor, Michigan | 4–3 | 35–17 | 10–4 |
| 53 | May 16 | Purdue | Ray Fisher Stadium • Ann Arbor, Michigan | 7–6 | 36–17 | 10–4 |
| 54 | May 23 | Minnesota | Ray Fisher Stadium • Ann Arbor, Michigan | 10–6 | 37–17 | 10–4 |

Mideast Regional (4–1)

| # | Date | Opponent | Site/stadium | Score | Overall record | Big Ten record |
|---|---|---|---|---|---|---|
| 55 | May 22 | New Orleans | Ray Fisher Stadium • Ann Arbor, Michigan | 1–2 | 37–18 | 10–4 |
| 56 | May 23 | UNLV | Ray Fisher Stadium • Ann Arbor, Michigan | 6–2 | 38–18 | 10–4 |
| 57 | May 24 | New Orleans | Ray Fisher Stadium • Ann Arbor, Michigan | 7–1 | 39–18 | 10–4 |
| 58 | May 24 | Eastern Michigan | Ray Fisher Stadium • Ann Arbor, Michigan | 10–0 | 40–18 | 10–4 |
| 59 | May 25 | Eastern Michigan | Ray Fisher Stadium • Ann Arbor, Michigan | 4–0 | 41–18 | 10–4 |

1981 College World Series (0–2)

| # | Date | Opponent | Site/stadium | Score | Overall record | Big Ten record |
|---|---|---|---|---|---|---|
| 60 | May 30 | vs Mississippi State | Johnny Rosenblatt Stadium • Omaha, Nebraska | 0–4 | 41–19 | 10–4 |
| 61 | June 2 | vs Texas | Johnny Rosenblatt Stadium • Omaha, Nebraska | 5–6 | 41–20 | 10–4 |

== Awards and honors ==
Scot Elam

- First Team All-Big Ten

Tony Evans

- First Team All-Big Ten

Jim Paciorek

- First Team All-Big Ten
