= 1981 Big Ten baseball tournament =

1981 Big Ten Conference baseball tournament
- Teams: 4
- Format: Double-elimination
- Finals site: Ray Fisher Stadium; Ann Arbor, MI
- Champions: Michigan (1st title)
- Winning coach: Bud Middaugh (1st title)
- MVP: Gerry Hool (Michigan)

1981 Big Ten Conference baseball standings
	Conf.				Overall
Team	W		L	PCT	W		L	PCT
East
Michigan ^{x}‍‍‡‍^{y}	10	–	4	.714	41	–	20	.672
Purdue ‍‍‍	8	–	6	.571	34	–	30	.531
Ohio State ‍‍‍	7	–	9	.438	34	–	18	.654
Michigan State ‍‍‍	6	–	8	.429	23	–	28	.451
Indiana ‍‍‍	5	–	9	.357	23	–	25	.479
West
Minnesota ^{x}‍‍‍	13	–	3	.813	37	–	16	.698
Illinois ‍‍‍	11	–	3	.786	35	–	26	.574
Iowa ‍‍‍	8	–	6	.571	44	–	21	.677
Wisconsin ‍‍‍	3	–	13	.188	24	–	36	.400
Northwestern ‍‍‍	3	–	13	.188	17	–	33	.340
x – Division champion ‡ – Tournament champion y – Invited to the NCAA tournament As of June 30, 1981; Rankings from Collegiate Baseball

The 1981 Big Ten Conference baseball tournament was held at Ray Fisher Stadium on the campus of the University of Michigan in Ann Arbor, Michigan, from May 15 through 17. The top two teams from the regular season in each division participated in the double-elimination tournament, the first such event sponsored by the Big Ten Conference to determine the league champion. Michigan won the first tournament championship and earned the Big Ten Conference's automatic bid to the 1981 NCAA Division I baseball tournament

== Format and seeding ==
The 1981 tournament was a 4-team double-elimination tournament, with seeds determined by conference regular season winning percentage within each division. The top seed from each division played the second seed from the opposite division in the first round.

Team	W	L	PCT	GB	Seed
East Division
Michigan	10	4	.714	–	1E
Purdue	8	6	.567	2	2E
Ohio State	7	9	.438	4	–
Michigan State	6	8	.429	4	–
Indiana	5	9	.367	5	–
West Division
Minnesota	13	3	.813	–	1W
Illinois	11	3	.786	1	2W
Iowa	8	6	.571	4	–
Wisconsin	3	13	.188	10	–
Northwestern	3	13	.188	10	–

== Tournament ==
Upper round 1
1E	Michigan	4
2W	Illinois	3
1W	Minnesota	0
2E	Purdue	9
Lower round 1
2W	Illinois	0
1W	Minnesota	2

Upper final
1E	Michigan	7
2E	Purdue	6
Lower final
2E	Purdue	3
1W	Minnesota	8

Final
1E	Michigan	10
2E	Minnesota	6

== All-Tournament Team ==
The following players were named to the All-Tournament Team.

Pos	Name	School
P	Steve Ontiveros	Michigan
P	Bob Hallas	Purdue
C	Gerry Hool	Michigan
1B	Greg Beno	Purdue
2B	Mike Ledna	Purdue
3B	Chris Sabo	Michigan
SS	Bill Piwnica	Minnesota
OF	Jim Paciorek	Michigan
OF	Greg Schulte	Michigan
OF	Terry Steinbach	Minnesota
DH	John Young	Michigan

=== Most Outstanding Player ===
Gerry Hool was named Most Outstanding Player. Hool was a catcher for Michigan.
