= 1981 Arizona State Sun Devils baseball team =

American college baseball season

1981 Arizona State Sun Devils baseball

National champions Pac-10 champions
- Conference: Pac-10 Conference
- CB: No. 1
- Record: 55–13 (26–4 Pac-10)
- Head coach: Jim Brock (10th year)
- Assistant coaches: Benny Hines; Tim Kelly; Jack Lind
- Home stadium: Packard Stadium

1981 Pacific-10 Conference baseball standings
	Conf.				Overall
Team	W		L	PCT	W		L	PCT
Northern
Washington ^{x}‍‍‍	12	–	6	.667	34	–	18	.654
Oregon State ‍‍‍	11	–	7	.611	29	–	14	.674
Washington State ‍‍‍	11	–	7	.611	27	–	25	.519
Oregon ‍‍‍	2	–	16	.111	16	–	21	.432
Southern
No. 1 Arizona State ^{x}‍‍‍^{y}	26	–	4	.867	55	–	13	.809
Stanford ‍‍‍^{y}	16	–	14	.533	43	–	22	.662
Southern California ‍‍‍	15	–	15	.500	34	–	24	.586
Arizona ‍‍‍	14	–	16	.467	30	–	22	.577
California ‍‍‍	12	–	18	.400	31	–	31	.500
UCLA ‍‍‍	7	–	23	.233	21	–	35	.375
x – Division champion y – Invited to the NCAA tournament As of June 30, 1981; Rankings from Collegiate Baseball

The 1981 Arizona State Sun Devils baseball team represented Arizona State University in the 1981 NCAA Division I baseball season. The Sun Devils played their home games at Packard Stadium. The team was coached by Jim Brock in his 10th season at Arizona State.

The Sun Devils won the College World Series, defeating the Oklahoma State Cowboys in the championship game.

== Roster ==
1981 Arizona State Sun Devils roster
Pitchers: 3 Randy Newman; 10 Mark Brewer; 14 Jeff Ahern; 18 Barry Koch; 19 Kevin Dukes; 20 Mike Pagel; 21 Kent Nielson; 25 Jim Jefferson; 27 Kendall Carter; 29 Jim Boudreau	Infielders: 4 Billy DeMann; 6 Donnie Hill; 7 Mike McCain; 9 Alvin Davis; 11 CJ Thompson; 15 Greg Steen; 16 Mike Sodders; 22 Chris Johnson	Outfielders: 5 Stan Holmes; 12 Kevin Romine; 23 Lemmie Miller; 24 Gib Seibert; 28 Ricky Nelson; Catchers: 8 Ric Wilson; 17 Jim Tognozzi

== Schedule ==
1981 Arizona State Sun Devils baseball game log
Regular season
February

Date	Opponent	Site/stadium	Score	Overall record	Pac-10 record
February 2	Long Beach State	Packard Stadium	6–4	1–0	–
February 3	Long Beach State	Packard Stadium	15–9	2–0	–
February 4	Long Beach State	Packard Stadium	21–10	3–0	–
February 6	at Cal State Fullerton	Titan Field	1–3	3–1	–
February 7	at Cal State Fullerton	Titan Field	5–7	3–2	–
February 11	UC Riverside	Packard Stadium	10–5	4–2	–
February 14	Wichita State	Packard Stadium	12–10	5–2	–
February 15	Wichita State	Packard Stadium	9–10	5–3	–
February 16	Wichita State	Packard Stadium	11–2	6–3	–
February 18	Azusa Pacific	Packard Stadium	17–10	7–3	–
February 19	Azusa Pacific	Packard Stadium	9–0	8–3	–
February 20	New Mexico	Packard Stadium	16–13	9–3	–
February 21	New Mexico	Packard Stadium	19–15	10–3	–
February 22	New Mexico	Packard Stadium	10–2	11–3	–
February 23	La Verne	Packard Stadium	14–4	12–3	–
February 25	La Verne	Packard Stadium	12–4	13–3	–
February 27	UNLV	Packard Stadium	4–3	14–3	–
February 28	UNLV	Packard Stadium	8–3	15–3	–

March

Date	Opponent	Site/stadium	Score	Overall record	Pac-10 record
March 1	UNLV	Packard Stadium	7–5	16–3	–
March 3	BYU	Packard Stadium	17–2	17–3	–
March 3	BYU	Packard Stadium	4–5	17–4	–
March 6	at UCLA	Jackie Robinson Stadium	13–9	18–4	1–0
March 7	at UCLA	Jackie Robinson Stadium	10–1	19–4	2–0
March 8	at UCLA	Jackie Robinson Stadium	15–5	20–4	3–0
March 10	at Fresno State	Pete Beiden Field	5–7	20–5	–
March 11	at Santa Clara	Buck Shaw Stadium	0–2	20–6	–
March 14	at California	Evans Diamond	8–6	21–6	4–0
March 14	at California	Evans Diamond	10–6	22–6	5–0
March 18	UTEP	Packard Stadium	21–0	23–6	–
March 20	Southern California	Packard Stadium	7–4	24–6	6–0
March 21	Southern California	Packard Stadium	20–12	25–6	7–0
March 22	Southern California	Packard Stadium	10–6	26–6	8–0
March 24	Grand Canyon	Packard Stadium	3–5	26–7	–
March 27	Stanford	Packard Stadium	9–2	27–7	9–0
March 28	Stanford	Packard Stadium	12–7	28–7	10–0
March 29	Stanford	Packard Stadium	9–6	29–7	11–0
March 31	Lewis-Clark State	Packard Stadium	17–7	30–7	–

April

Date	Opponent	Site/stadium	Score	Overall record	Pac-10 record
April 2	at Arizona	Sancet Stadium	4–9	30–8	11–1
April 3	at Arizona	Sancet Stadium	10–8	31–8	12–1
April 4	at Arizona	Sancet Stadium	23–11	32–8	13–1
April 7	Grand Canyon	Packard Stadium	14–9	33–8	–
April 9	California	Packard Stadium	8–7	34–8	14–1
April 10	California	Packard Stadium	19–5	35–8	15–1
April 11	California	Packard Stadium	6–4	36–8	16–1
April 12	California	Packard Stadium	8–4	37–8	17–1
April 14	Northern Arizona	Packard Stadium	4–5	37–9	–
April 16	at Southern California	Dedeaux Field	6–0	38–9	18–1
April 17	at Southern California	Dedeaux Field	13–3	39–9	19–1
April 18	at Southern California	Dedeaux Field	13–2	40–9	20–1
April 21	at Northern Arizona		7–4	41–9	–
April 24	UCLA	Packard Stadium	6–5	42–9	21–1
April 25	UCLA	Packard Stadium	10–9	43–9	22–1
April 26	UCLA	Packard Stadium	14–9	44–9	23–1

May

Date	Opponent	Site/stadium	Score	Overall record	Pac-10 record
May 1	at Stanford	Sunken Diamond	3–18	44–10	23–2
May 2	at Stanford	Sunken Diamond	4–9	44–11	23–3
May 3	at Stanford	Sunken Diamond	4–16	44–12	23–4
May 7	Arizona	Packard Stadium	10–6	45–12	24–4
May 8	Arizona	Packard Stadium	13–4	46–12	25–4
May 9	Arizona	Packard Stadium	6–5	47–12	26–4

Postseason
NCAA tournament: West Regional

Date	Opponent	Site/stadium	Score	Overall record
May 22	vs. Gonzaga	Packard Stadium	9–6	48–12
May 23	vs. Cal State Fullerton	Packard Stadium	18–9	49–12
May 24	vs. Cal State Fullerton	Packard Stadium	12–7	50–12

NCAA tournament: College World Series

Date	Opponent	Site/stadium	Score	Overall record
May 30	vs. Texas	Rosenblatt Stadium	11–2	51–12
June 2	vs. Mississippi State	Rosenblatt Stadium	4–3	52–12
June 5	vs. Oklahoma State	Rosenblatt Stadium	10–11	52–13
June 6	vs. South Carolina	Rosenblatt Stadium	10–7	53–13
June 7	vs. Texas	Rosenblatt Stadium	12–3	54–13
June 8	vs. Oklahoma State	Rosenblatt Stadium	7–4	55–13

== Awards and honors ==
Kendall Carter

- First Team All-American
- First Team All-Pac-10

Alvin Davis

- College World Series All-Tournament Team
- First Team All-Pac-10

Kevin Dukes

- College World Series All-Tournament Team
- First Team All-Pac-10

Stan Holmes

- College World Series Most Outstanding Player

Lemmie Miller

- College World Series All-Tournament Team

Ricky Nelson

- First Team All-Pac-10

Kevin Romine

- First Team All-American
- First Team All-Pac-10

Mike Sodders

- College World Series All-Tournament Team
- Baseball America Player of the Year
- First Team All-American
- First Team All-Pac-10
- Pac-10 Player of the Year

== Sun Devils in the 1981 MLB draft ==
The following members of the Arizona State Sun Devils baseball program were drafted in the 1981 Major League Baseball draft.

Player	Position	Round	Overall	MLB team
Mike Sodders	3B	1st	11th	Minnesota Twins
Kevin Dukes	LHP	2nd	27th	Seattle Mariners
Lemmie Miller	OF	2nd	50th	Los Angeles Dodgers
Ricky Nelson	OF	4th	78th	Seattle Mariners
Alvin Davis	1B	6th	144th	Oakland Athletics
Stan Holmes	OF	8th	192nd	Minnesota Twins
Allen Black	RHP	15th	365th	Chicago Cubs
Mike McCain	INF	16th	400th	Minnesota Twins
