= 1981 Mid-American Conference baseball tournament =

American collegiate baseball tournament

- Teams: 4
- Format: Double-elimination
- Finals site: Bill Theunissen Stadium (1948); Mount Pleasant, MI
- Champions: Eastern Michigan (1st title)
- Winning coach: Ron Oestrike (1st title)

1981 Mid-American Conference baseball standings
	Conf.						Overall
Team	W		L		T	PCT	W		L		T	PCT
Central Michigan ‍†‍‍	13	–	3	–	0	.813	37	–	13	–	0	.740
Western Michigan ‍‍‍	14	–	3	–	1	.806	32	–	21	–	1	.602
Miami ‍‍‍	12	–	5	–	1	.694	22	–	27	–	1	.450
Eastern Michigan ‍‍‡‍^{y}	9	–	7	–	0	.563	37	–	29	–	0	.561
Toledo ‍‍‍	8	–	9	–	0	.471	30	–	20	–	0	.600
Northern Illinois ‍‍‍	6	–	10	–	2	.389	19	–	26	–	2	.426
Kent State ‍‍‍	5	–	8	–	0	.385	13	–	18	–	1	.422
Bowling Green ‍‍‍	5	–	8	–	0	.385	13	–	18	–	1	.422
Ohio ‍‍‍	5	–	13	–	0	.278	12	–	34	–	0	.261
Ball State ‍‍‍	4	–	12	–	0	.250	18	–	22	–	0	.450
† – Conference champion ‡ – Tournament champion y – Invited to the NCAA tournament As of June 30, 1981; Rankings from Collegiate Baseball

The 1981 Mid-American Conference baseball tournament took place from May 16 to 18 of that year. The top four regular season finishers of the league's ten teams met in the double-elimination tournament held at Bill Theunissen Stadium in Mount Pleasant, Michigan. This was the first time the Mid-American Conference held a postseason tournament to determine a champion. Fourth seeded Eastern Michigan won the first tournament to earn the conference's automatic bid to the 1981 NCAA Division I baseball tournament.

== Seeding and format ==
The top four finishers were seeded one through four based on conference winning percentage only. The teams played a double-elimination tournament.

Team	W	L	Tie	PCT	GB	Seed
Central Michigan	13	3	0	.813	–	1
Western Michigan	14	3	1	.806	.5	2
Miami	12	5	1	.694	2	3
Eastern Michigan	9	7	0	.563	4	4
Toledo	8	9	0	.471	5.5	–
Northern Illinois	6	10	2	.389	8	–
Kent State	5	8	0	.385	6.5	–
Bowling Green	5	11	0	.313	8	–
Ohio	5	13	0	.278	9	–
Ball State	4	12	0	.250	9	–

== Results ==
Upper round 1
1	Central Michigan	0
4	Eastern Michigan	7
2	Western Michigan	0
3	Miami	8
Lower round 1
1	Central Michigan	4
2	Western Michigan	2

Upper final
4	Eastern Michigan	5
3	Miami	2
Lower final
3	Miami	1
1	Central Michigan	4

Final
4	Eastern Michigan	5	—
1	Central Michigan	4	—
