= 1981 Eastern 8 Conference baseball championship series =

American college baseball tournament

1981 Eastern 8 Conference baseball tournament
- Teams: 2
- Format: Best of 3 series
- Finals site: The Ellipse; Washington, D.C.
- Champions: Rutgers (1st title)
- Winning coach: Matt Bolger (1st title)

1981 Eastern 8 Conference baseball standings
	Conf.						Overall
Team	W		L		T	PCT	W		L		T	PCT
East
Rutgers ^{x}‍‍‡‍	5	–	3	–	0	.625	18	–	19	–	1	.487
UMass ‍‍‍	4	–	4	–	0	.500	22	–	17	–	0	.564
Rhode Island ‍‍‍	3	–	5	–	0	.375	14	–	18	–	0	.438
West
West Virginia ^{x}‍‍‍	6	–	2	–	0	.750	17	–	18	–	0	.486
Pittsburgh ‍‍‍	7	–	3	–	0	.700	25	–	8	–	0	.758
George Washington ‍‍‍	3	–	3	–	0	.500	18	–	20	–	0	.474
Duquesne ‍‍‍	0	–	8	–	0	.000	13	–	12	–	0	.520
x – Division champion ‡ – Championship Series champion As of June 30, 1981; Rankings from Collegiate Baseball

The 1981 Eastern 8 Conference Baseball Championship Series was held on May 8 and 9, 1981 to determine the champion of the NCAA Division I Eastern 8 Conference, renamed in 1982 as the Atlantic 10 Conference, for the 1981 NCAA Division I baseball season. This was the third iteration of the event, and was held on the campus of George Mason in Fairfax, Virginia. Rutgers won the championship.

== Format and seeding ==
The regular season winners of each of the conference's two divisions advanced to a best of three series.

Team	W	L	Pct	GB
East Division
Rutgers	5	3	.625	—
UMass	4	4	.500	1
Rhode Island	3	5	.375	2

Team	W	L	Pct	GB
Western Division
West Virginia	6	2	.750	—
Pittsburgh	7	3	.700	—
George Washington	3	3	.500	1.5
Duquesne	0	8	.000	6

== Results ==
Game One

May 8, 1981
Team	R
Rutgers	25
West Virginia	13

Game Two

May 9, 1981
Team	R
West Virginia	5
Rutgers	7

== Notes ==
- Rutgers 25 runs are a tournament record.
