= 1981 Arizona Wildcats baseball team =

American college baseball season

1981 Arizona Wildcats baseball
- Conference: Pacific-10 Conference
- Record: 30–22 (14–16 Pac-10)
- Head coach: Jerry Kindall (9th season)
- Assistant coaches: Jerry Stitt (3rd season); Jim Wing (9th season)
- Home stadium: Wildcat Field

1981 Pacific-10 Conference baseball standings
	Conf.				Overall
Team	W		L	PCT	W		L	PCT
Northern
Washington ^{x}‍‍‍	12	–	6	.667	34	–	18	.654
Oregon State ‍‍‍	11	–	7	.611	29	–	14	.674
Washington State ‍‍‍	11	–	7	.611	27	–	25	.519
Oregon ‍‍‍	2	–	16	.111	16	–	21	.432
Southern
No. 1 Arizona State ^{x}‍‍‍^{y}	26	–	4	.867	55	–	13	.809
Stanford ‍‍‍^{y}	16	–	14	.533	43	–	22	.662
Southern California ‍‍‍	15	–	15	.500	34	–	24	.586
Arizona ‍‍‍	14	–	16	.467	30	–	22	.577
California ‍‍‍	12	–	18	.400	31	–	31	.500
UCLA ‍‍‍	7	–	23	.233	21	–	35	.375
x – Division champion y – Invited to the NCAA tournament As of June 30, 1981; Rankings from Collegiate Baseball

The 1981 Arizona Wildcats baseball team represented the University of Arizona during the 1981 NCAA Division I baseball season. The Wildcats played their home games at Wildcat Field. The team was coached by Jerry Kindall in his 9th season at Arizona. The Wildcats finished 30–22 overall and placed 4th in the Pacific-10's Southern Division with an 14–16 record. Arizona failed to make the postseason for the 1st time since 1977.

== Previous season ==
The Wildcats finished the 1980 season with a record of 45–21–1 and 17–13 in conference play, finishing tied for 1st in the "Six-Pac" (Pac-10 Southern). This was the Wildcats' 1st Pacific-10 Conference championship. Arizona advanced to the postseason for the 3rd straight season and was selected to host the West Regional at Wildcat Field. The Wildcats defeated Fresno State in their 1st game before defeating Gonzaga twice to advance to the College World Series for the 2nd straight season (and 12th overall). After losing their 1st game in Omaha, Nebraska to St. John's, Arizona won the next 4 against Florida State, Michigan, Hawaii and California to advance to the final game: a rematch against Hawaii. The Wildcats defeated Hawaii 5–3 to win their 2nd National Championship.

== Personnel ==
=== Roster ===
1981 Arizona Wildcats baseball roster
• Jim Bagnall • Tommy Barrett • Casey Candaele • Joe Cipolloni • Rocky Coyle • Jack Daugherty • Mike Flinn • Chuck Haney	• Chuck Hovack • Walter Kellner • Dave Landrith • Tyler Lawton • Rich Lucero • Steven Miller • Garret Nago • Dave Page	• Dave Powers • Mike Querry • Pat Roessler • David Rooker • Ron Sismondo • Dwight Taylor • Ed Vosberg • Kevin Ward

=== Coaches ===
1981 Arizona Wildcats baseball coaching staff
- Jerry Kindall – Head coach
- Jerry Stitt – Assistant coach
- Jim Wing – Assistant coach

== 1981 Schedule and results ==
1981 Arizona Wildcats baseball game log
Regular season
Date	Opponent	Site/Stadium	Score	Overall Record	Pac-10 Record
Feb 6	San Diego	Wildcat Field • Tucson, AZ	W 16–5	1–0	
Feb 7	San Diego	Wildcat Field • Tucson, AZ	W 12–10	2–0	
Feb 7	San Diego	Wildcat Field • Tucson, AZ	W 21–0	3–0	
Feb 10	UC Riverside	Wildcat Field • Tucson, AZ	W 8–5	4–0	
Feb 10	UC Riverside	Wildcat Field • Tucson, AZ	L 2–5	4-1c	
Feb 12	Cal State Fullerton	Wildcat Field • Tucson, AZ	W 10–9	5–1	
Feb 13	Cal State Fullerton	Wildcat Field • Tucson, AZ	L 2–8	5–2	
Feb 14	Cal State Fullerton	Wildcat Field • Tucson, AZ	W 2–0	6–2	
Feb 16	UTEP	Wildcat Field • Tucson, AZ	W 14–13	7–2	
Feb 17	UTEP	Wildcat Field • Tucson, AZ	W 9–5	8–2	
Feb 18	UTEP	Wildcat Field • Tucson, AZ	W 23–4	9–2	
Feb 20	at Cal State Fullerton	Titan Field • Fullerton, CA	W 2–1	10–2	
Feb 22	at Cal State Fullerton	Titan Field • Fullerton, CA	L 3–4	10–3	
Feb 24	La Verne	Wildcat Field • Tucson, AZ	W 9–8	11–3	
Feb 24	La Verne	Wildcat Field • Tucson, AZ	W 9–7	12–3	
Feb 27	California	Wildcat Field • Tucson, AZ	L 8–14	12–4	0–1
Feb 28	California	Wildcat Field • Tucson, AZ	W 11–5	13–4	1–1
Mar 1	California	Wildcat Field • Tucson, AZ	W 8–1	14–4	2–1
Mar 4	BYU	Wildcat Field • Tucson, AZ	W 4–1	15–4	
Mar 6	at Stanford	Sunken Diamond • Palo Alto, CA	W 9–4	16–4	3–1
Mar 7	at Stanford	Sunken Diamond • Palo Alto, CA	L 4–5	16–5	3–2
Mar 8	at Stanford	Sunken Diamond • Palo Alto, CA	L 12–14	16–6	3–3
Mar 10	Mississippi State	Wildcat Field • Tucson, AZ	L 9–11	16–7	
Mar 11	Mississippi State	Wildcat Field • Tucson, AZ	L 12–16	16–8	
Mar 13	UCLA	Wildcat Field • Tucson, AZ	L 2–5	16–9	3–4
Mar 14	UCLA	Wildcat Field • Tucson, AZ	W 10–9	17–9	4–4
Mar 15	UCLA	Wildcat Field • Tucson, AZ	L 2–8	17–10	4–5
Mar 27	at USC	Dedeaux Field • Los Angeles, CA	W 12–7	18–10	5–5
Mar 28	at USC	Dedeaux Field • Los Angeles, CA	L 10–15	18–11	5–6
Mar 29	at USC	Dedeaux Field • Los Angeles, CA	W 10–6	19–11	6–6
Apr 2	Arizona State	Wildcat Field • Tucson, AZ	W 9–4	20–11	7–6
Apr 3	Arizona State	Wildcat Field • Tucson, AZ	L 8–10	20–12	7–7
Apr 4	Arizona State	Wildcat Field • Tucson, AZ	L 11–23	20–13	7–8
Apr 6	Lewis & Clark	Wildcat Field • Tucson, AZ	W 8–2	21–13	
Apr 10	at UCLA	Jackie Robinson Stadium • Los Angeles, CA	W 5–3	22–13	8–8
Apr 11	at UCLA	Jackie Robinson Stadium • Los Angeles, CA	L 8–9	22–14	8–9
Apr 12	at UCLA	Jackie Robinson Stadium • Los Angeles, CA	W 10–5	23–14	9–9
Apr 16	at California	Evans Diamond • Berkeley, CA	W 8–5	24–14	10–9
Apr 17	at California	Evans Diamond • Berkeley, CA	W 9–1	25–14	11–9
Apr 18	at California	Evans Diamond • Berkeley, CA	L 8–9	25–15	11–10
Apr 24	Stanford	Wildcat Field • Tucson, AZ	L 6–11	25–16	11–11
Apr 25	Stanford	Wildcat Field • Tucson, AZ	W 18–16	26–16	12–11
Apr 26	Stanford	Wildcat Field • Tucson, AZ	L 13–21	26–17	12–12
Apr 28	Grand Canyon	Wildcat Field • Tucson, AZ	L 5–6	26–18	
May 2	USC	Wildcat Field • Tucson, AZ	W 6–2	27–18	13–12
May 2	USC	Wildcat Field • Tucson, AZ	L 8–9	27–19	13–13
May 3	USC	Wildcat Field • Tucson, AZ	W 16–4	28–19	14–13
May 5	Northern Arizona	Wildcat Field • Tucson, AZ	W 10–8	29–19	
May 5	Northern Arizona	Wildcat Field • Tucson, AZ	W 6–1	30–19	
May 7	at Arizona State	Packard Stadium • Tempe, AZ	L 6–10	30–20	14–14
May 8	at Arizona State	Packard Stadium • Tempe, AZ	L 4–13	30–21	14–15
May 9	at Arizona State	Packard Stadium • Tempe, AZ	L 5–6	30–22	14–16

== 1981 MLB draft ==
Player	Position	Round	Overall	MLB team
Dwight Taylor	OF	7	168	Cleveland Indians
Ron Sismondo	LHP	11	280	Milwaukee Brewers
Rich Seidel	RHP	2 (6sc)	50	California Angels
