= Stanley Holmes =

Stanley Holmes can refer to:

- Joseph Stanley Holmes, 1st Baron Dovercourt (1878–1961), British Liberal politician, Member of Parliament 1918–22 and 1935–1954
- John Stanley Holmes, British Liberal politician, unsuccessful candidate for Tynemouth (UK Parliament constituency) in 1931 and 1935
- Stan Holmes (1960–2011), American baseball player
