= 1981 Mississippi State Bulldogs baseball team =

American college baseball season

1981 Mississippi State Bulldogs baseball

SEC West champions NCAA Atlantic Regional champions

College World Series, 1–2
- Conference: Southeastern Conference
- CB: No. 6
- Record: 46–17 (17–6 SEC)
- Head coach: Ron Polk (6th season)
- Home stadium: Dudy Noble Field

1981 Southeastern Conference baseball standings
	Conf.				Overall
Team	W		L	PCT	W		L	PCT
Eastern Division
No. 15 Florida ^{x}‍‍‡‍^{y}	16	–	7	.696	42	–	17	.712
Kentucky ‍‍‍	13	–	9	.591	39	–	16	.709
Tennessee ‍‍‍	10	–	13	.435	22	–	27	.449
Vanderbilt ‍‍‍	9	–	12	.429	26	–	25	.510
Georgia ‍‍‍	8	–	15	.348	23	–	23	.500
Western Division
No. 6 Mississippi State ^{x}‍‍‍^{y}	17	–	6	.739	46	–	17	.730
Alabama ^{x}‍‍‍	17	–	6	.739	41	–	15	.732
Ole Miss ‍‍‍	8	–	14	.364	24	–	24	.500
LSU ‍‍‍	7	–	14	.333	23	–	30	.434
Auburn ‍‍‍	7	–	16	.304	27	–	27	.500
x – Division champion ‡ – Tournament champion y – Invited to the NCAA tournament As of June 30, 1981; Rankings from Collegiate Baseball

The 1981 Mississippi State Bulldogs baseball team represented Mississippi State University in the 1981 NCAA Division I baseball season. They were led by head coach Ron Polk in his sixth season and played their home games at Dudy Noble Field. The Bulldogs were members of the Southeastern Conference, and finished with a record of 46–17, co-champions of the SEC West with a record of 17–6.

Mississippi State was invited to the NCAA Tournament, where they won the Atlantic Regional to advance to their third College World Series. The Bulldogs tied for fifth, recording an opening round win against Michigan and losses to eventual champion Arizona State and semifinalist South Carolina.

== Personnel ==
=== Roster ===
1981 Mississippi State Bulldogs roster
Pitchers: 12 - Harold Myles - Sophomore; 13 - Don Mundie - Senior; 17 - John Shrewsberry - Senior; 18 - Allen Morlock - Junior; 20 - Phil Weathersby - Junior; 22 - Steve Susce - Junior; 23 - Mark Taylor - Junior; 37 - Dan Hogan - Freshman	Catchers: 10 - John Shannon - Freshman; 19 - Jay Porter - Sophomore; 26 - Dave Bullard - Freshman; Outfielders: 8 - Mark Gillaspie - Senior; 9 - Tony Gage - Junior; 25 - Brad Winkler - Junior; 34 - Scott Darlington - Senior; 39 - Glenn Young - Sophomore; Utility: 6 - Steve D'Ercole - Senior; 11 - Rick Bairley - Junior; 28 - Terry Loe - Graduate; 33 - Bill Bond - Junior	Infielders: 2 - Billy Martz - Senior; 3 - Dan Zelmer - Sophomore; 4 - Dan Van Cleve - Freshman; 5 - Chris Maloney - Sophomore; 14 - Dwayne Brown - Senior; 15 - Dave Klipstein - Junior; 21 - Lou Sotille - Senior; 29 - Pete White - Junior; 35 - Bruce Castoria - Junior; 38 - Tim Parenton - Freshman

=== Coaching staff ===
1981 Mississippi State Bulldogs coaching staff
- - Ron Polk - Head coach – 6th season
- - Mark Johnson - 6th season

== Schedule ==
Legend
	Mississippi State win
	Mississippi State loss
*	Non-Conference game

1981 Mississippi State Bulldogs baseball game log
Regular season

February
Date	Opponent	Site/stadium	Score	Overall record	SEC record
Feb 25	Livingston*	Dudy Noble Field • Starkville, MS	W 15–1	1–0	
Feb 28	LSU	Dudy Noble Field • Starkville, MS	W 15–1 ^{(7)}	2–0	1–0
Feb 28	LSU	Dudy Noble Field • Starkville, MS	W 5–2 ^{(7)}	3–0	2–0

March
Date	Opponent	Site/stadium	Score	Overall record	SEC record
Mar 3	Louisiana Tech*	Dudy Noble Field • Starkville, MS	W 10–2	4–0	
Mar 5	Louisiana Tech*	Dudy Noble Field • Starkville, MS	W 8–7	5–0	
Mar 6	Auburn	Dudy Noble Field • Starkville, MS	L 7–8 ^{(7)}	5–1	2–1
Mar 6	Auburn	Dudy Noble Field • Starkville, MS	L 3–4 ^{(7)}	5–2	2–2
Mar 7	Auburn	Dudy Noble Field • Starkville, MS	W 8–3	6–2	3–2
Mar 10	at Arizona*	Wildcat Field • Tucson, AZ	W 11–9	7–2	
Mar 11	at Arizona*	Wildcat Field • Tucson, AZ	W 16–12	8–2	
Mar 12	at Grand Canyon*	Brazell Field • Phoenix, AZ	W 9–1	9–2	
Mar 13	at Grand Canyon*	Brazell Field • Phoenix, AZ	W 10–7	10–2	
Mar 14	vs Oklahoma State*	Roger Barnson Field • Paradise, NV	L 9–20	10–3	
Mar 15	at UNLV*	Roger Barnson Field • Paradise, NV	W 23–17 ^{(7)}	11–3	
Mar 15	at UNLV*	Roger Barnson Field • Paradise, NV	W 4–3 ^{(7)}	12–3	
Mar 19	at Livingston*	Livingston, AL	W 21–20	13–3	
Mar 21	Alabama	Dudy Noble Field • Starkville, MS	W 5–3 ^{(7)}	14–3	4–2
Mar 21	Alabama	Dudy Noble Field • Starkville, MS	L 1–2 ^{(5)}	14–4	4–3
Mar 22	Alabama	Dudy Noble Field • Starkville, MS	L 4–8	14–5	4–4
Mar 24	vs Ole Miss	Smith–Wills Stadium • Jackson, MS	W 4–3	15–5	
Mar 27	at Southern Miss*	Kamper Park • Hattiesburg, MS	W 5–4	16–5	
Mar 28	at Southern Miss*	Kamper Park • Hattiesburg, MS	W 6–2	17–5	
Mar 30	at South Alabama*	Eddie Stanky Field • Mobile, AL	L 3–5	17–6	
Mar 31	at South Alabama*	Eddie Stanky Field • Mobile, AL	L 4–7	17–7	

April
Date	Opponent	Site/stadium	Score	Overall record	SEC record
Apr 3	Mississippi College*	Dudy Noble Field • Starkville, MS	W 14–1	18–7	
Apr 4	Ole Miss	Dudy Noble Field • Starkville, MS	W 12–4	19–7	5–4
Apr 5	Ole Miss	Dudy Noble Field • Starkville, MS	W 7–1 ^{(7)}	20–7	6–4
Apr 5	Ole Miss	Dudy Noble Field • Starkville, MS	W 8–3 ^{(7)}	21–7	7–4
Apr 7	Tulane*	Dudy Noble Field • Starkville, MS	W 12–5	22–7	
Apr 7	Tulane*	Dudy Noble Field • Starkville, MS	W 12–4	23–7	
Apr 9	at Mississippi College*	Frierson Field • Clinton, MS	L 2–5	23–8	
Apr 11	at Auburn	Plainsman Park • Auburn, AL	L 4–6 ^{(7)}	23–9	7–5
Apr 11	at Auburn	Plainsman Park • Auburn, AL	W 3–2 ^{(7)}	24–9	8–5
Apr 12	at Auburn	Plainsman Park • Auburn, AL	W 12–6	25–9	9–5
Apr 14	Delta State*	Dudy Noble Field • Starkville, MS	L 1–4	25–10	
Apr 15	Delta State	Dudy Noble Field • Starkville, MS	W 8–3	26–10	
Apr 18	at LSU	Alex Box Stadium • Baton Rouge, LA	W 11–1 ^{(7)}	27–10	10–5
Apr 18	at LSU	Alex Box Stadium • Baton Rouge, LA	W 7–2 ^{(7)}	28–10	11–5
Apr 19	at LSU	Alex Box Stadium • Baton Rouge, LA	W 12–4	29–10	12–5
Apr 21	William Carey*	Dudy Noble Field • Starkville, MS	W 11–3	30–10	
Apr 22	William Carey*	Dudy Noble Field • Starkville, MS	W 17–5	31–10	
Apr 25	Alabama	Dudy Noble Field • Starkville, MS	W 8–4 ^{(7)}	32–10	13–5
Apr 25	Alabama	Dudy Noble Field • Starkville, MS	W 5–3 ^{(7)}	33–10	14–5
Apr 26	Alabama	Dudy Noble Field • Starkville, MS	W 13–5	34–10	15–5
Apr 27	Arkansas State*	Dudy Noble Field • Starkville, MS	W 3–0	35–10	
Apr 28	Arkansas State*	Dudy Noble Field • Starkville, MS	W 24–3 ^{(7)}	36–10	
Apr 29	vs Arkansas*	Legion Field • Greenville, MS	W 11–4	37–10	
Apr 30	at Jackson State*	Smith–Wills Stadium • Jackson, MS	W 6–4	38–10	

May
Date	Opponent	Site/stadium	Score	Overall record	SEC record
May 1	at Jackson State*	Smith–Wills Stadium • Jackson, MS	L 10–11	38–11	
May 2	at Birmingham–Southern*	Stripling Field • Birmingham, AL	L 4–5	38–12	
May 3	at Birmingham–Southern*	Stripling Field • Birmingham, AL	W 11–7	39–12	
May 10	at Ole Miss	Swayze Field • Oxford, MS	W 12–6 ^{(7)}	40–12	16–5
May 10	at Ole Miss	Swayze Field • Oxford, MS	W 7–4 ^{(7)}	41–12	17–5
May 11	at Ole Miss	Swayze Field • Oxford, MS	L 4–7	41–13	17–6

Postseason

SEC Tournament
Date	Opponent	Site/stadium	Score	Overall record	SECT record
May 15	Kentucky	Dudy Noble Field • Starkville, MS	W 3–2	42–13	1–0
May 16	Florida	Dudy Noble Field • Starkville, MS	L 3–8	42–14	1–1
May 17	Kentucky	Dudy Noble Field • Starkville, MS	L 2–3	42–15	1–2

NCAA Atlantic Regional
Date	Opponent	Site/stadium	Score	Overall record	Regional record
May 22	East Tennessee State	Beautiful Tiger Field • Clemson, SC	W 7–6	43–15	1–0
May 23	Wichita State	Beautiful Tiger Field • Clemson, SC	W 5–1	44–15	2–0
May 24	East Tennessee State	Beautiful Tiger Field • Clemson, SC	W 6–5	45–15	3–0

College World Series
Date	Opponent	Site/stadium	Score	Overall record	CWS record
May 30	Michigan	Johnny Rosenblatt Stadium • Omaha, NE	W 4–1	46–15	1–0
June 2	Arizona State	Johnny Rosenblatt Stadium • Omaha, NE	L 3–4	46–16	1–1
June 4	South Carolina	Johnny Rosenblatt Stadium • Omaha, NE	L 5–6	46–17	1–2
