= 1981 Oklahoma State Cowboys baseball team =

American sports team in early 1980s

1981 Oklahoma State Cowboys baseball

Big 8 tournament champion Midwest Regional champion

College World Series, 2nd
- Conference: Big Eight Conference
- CB: No. 2
- Record: 52–17 (12–6 Big 8)
- Head coach: Gary Ward (4th year)
- Home stadium: Allie P. Reynolds Stadium

1981 Big Eight Conference baseball standings
	Conf.				Overall
Team	W		L	PCT	W		L	PCT
No. 30 Missouri ‍†‍‍^{y}	17	–	6	.739	43	–	16	.729
No. 2 Oklahoma State ‍‍‡‍^{y}	12	–	6	.667	52	–	17	.754
Kansas ‍‍‍	12	–	11	.522	32	–	19	.627
Nebraska ‍‍‍	11	–	11	.500	42	–	22	.656
Oklahoma ‍‍‍	11	–	13	.458	40	–	15	.727
Kansas State ‍‍‍	8	–	12	.400	34	–	21	.618
Iowa State ‍‍‍	6	–	18	.250	34	–	22	.607
† – Conference champion ‡ – Tournament champion y – Invited to the NCAA tournament As of June 30, 1981; Rankings from Collegiate Baseball

The 1981 Oklahoma State Cowboys baseball team represented Oklahoma State University–Stillwater in the 1981 NCAA Division I baseball season. The Cowboys played their home games at Allie P. Reynolds Stadium in Stillwater, Oklahoma. The team was coached by Gary Ward in his fourth season at Oklahoma State.

The Cowboys reached the College World Series, finishing as the runner up to Arizona State.

The Cowboys also won the Big Eight Conference championship, the first in a string of sixteen consecutive conference titles which lasted until the league merged with the Southwest Conference.

== Roster ==
1981 Oklahoma State Cowboys roster
- Tony Bartolomucci; - Chris Bayley; - Brad Bell; - Eric Dorn; - Luke Kutner; - Andy Pavlovic; - Craig Tice; - Steve Yoder	Pitchers: - Mitch Coplon; - Darren Dilks; - John Farrell; - Wayne Jacques; - Steve Lawrence; - Kurt Leiter; - Tim Rodgers; - Robbie Wine	Infielders: - John Cardinali; - Ray Etchebarren; - Don Freeman; - Gary Green; - Bubba Hudson; - Bruce Kastelic; - Steve O'Donnell; - Jim Traber; Catchers: - Mark Poole	Outfielders: - Stan Baughn; - George Chadwick; - Benji de la Rosa; - Glenn Edwards; - Tim Knapp; - Mickey Tettleton

== Schedule ==
Legend
Oklahoma State win
Oklahoma State loss

1981 Oklahoma State Cowboys baseball game log
Regular season

February
Date	Opponent	Site/stadium	Score	Overall record	Big 8 record
Feb 21	at Arkansas*	George Cole Field • Fayetteville, AR	W 5–4	1–0	
Feb 27	at Cameron*	Lawton, OK	W 5–1	2–0	
Feb 27	at Cameron*	Lawton, OK	W 8–1	3–0	

March
Date	Opponent	Site/stadium	Score	Overall record	Big 8 record
Mar 3	at Texas–Pan American*	Edinburg, TX	L 4–5	3–1	
Mar 4	at Texas–Pan American*	Edinburg, TX	L 0–3	3–2	
Mar 4	at Texas–Pan American*	Edinburg, TX	W 17–5	4–2	
Mar 5	vs Rice*	Edinburg, TX	L 1–2	4–3	
Mar 5	vs Rice*	Edinburg, TX	W 4–0	5–3	
Mar 6	at Texas–Pan American*	Edinburg, TX	W 6–3	6–3	
Mar 8	vs Kearney State*	El Paso, TX	W 10–0	7–3	
Mar 8	vs Kearney State*	El Paso, TX	W 10–4	8–3	
Mar 9	vs New Mexico State*	El Paso, TX	W 7–0	9–3	
Mar 10	at UTEP*	El Paso, TX	W 7–3	10–3	
Mar 11	vs Kearney State*	El Paso, TX	W 11–6	11–3	
Mar 12	vs Wyoming*	El Paso, TX	W 4–3	12–3	
Mar 12	vs Wyoming*	El Paso, TX	L 4–5	12–4	
Mar 14	at UNLV*	Rebel Field • Paradise, NV	W 16–5	13–4	
Mar 14	at UNLV*	Rebel Field • Paradise, NV	L 3–11	13–5	
Mar 15	vs Mississippi State*	Rebel Field • Paradise, NV	W 20–9	14–5	
Mar 17	Northwestern*	Stillwater, OK	W 20–1	15–5	
Mar 17	Northwestern*	Stillwater, OK	W 18–2	16–5	
Mar 20	vs Illinois*	Oklahoma City, OK	W 6–2	17–5	
Mar 20	vs Illinois*	Oklahoma City, OK	W 8–4	18–5	
Mar 21	vs Illinois*	Oklahoma City, OK	W 8–2	19–5	
Mar 21	vs Illinois*	Oklahoma City, OK	W 8–4	20–5	
Mar 24	Missouri Southern*	Stillwater, OK	W 13–3	21–5	
Mar 24	Missouri Southern*	Stillwater, OK	W 16–3	22–5	
Mar 28	at Kansas	Hoglund Ballpark • Lawrence, KS	L 1–6	22–6	0–1
Mar 28	at Kansas	Hoglund Ballpark • Lawrence, KS	W 4–2	23–6	1–1
Mar 30	at Kansas	Hoglund Ballpark • Lawrence, KS	W 3–2	24–6	2–1
Mar 30	at Kansas	Hoglund Ballpark • Lawrence, KS	W 3–0	25–6	3–1

April
Date	Opponent	Site/stadium	Score	Overall record	Big 8 record
Apr 1	Oklahoma Christian*	Stillwater, OK	W 13–5	26–6	
Apr 4	Missouri	Allie P. Reynolds Stadium • Stillwater, OK	L 6–8	26–7	3–2
Apr 4	Missouri	Allie P. Reynolds Stadium • Stillwater, OK	L 7–9	26–8	3–3
Apr 5	Missouri	Allie P. Reynolds Stadium • Stillwater, OK	W 7–4	27–8	4–3
Apr 5	Missouri	Allie P. Reynolds Stadium • Stillwater, OK	L 7–9	27–9	4–4
Apr 8	Oral Roberts*	Allie P. Reynolds Stadium • Stillwater, OK	W 10–9	28–9	
Apr 9	at Oral Roberts*	J. L. Johnson Stadium • Tulsa, OK	L 7–8	28–10	
Apr 11	Cameron*	Allie P. Reynolds Stadium • Stillwater, OK	W 23–12	29–10	
Apr 11	Cameron*	Allie P. Reynolds Stadium • Stillwater, OK	W 16–6	30–10	
Apr 12	Minnesota*	Allie P. Reynolds Stadium • Stillwater, OK	L 10–15	30–11	
Apr 13	Centenary*	Allie P. Reynolds Stadium • Stillwater, OK	W 7–5	31–11	
Apr 13	Centenary*	Allie P. Reynolds Stadium • Stillwater, OK	W 10–9	32–11	
Apr 16	Oklahoma City*	Allie P. Reynolds Stadium • Stillwater, OK	W 10–4	33–11	
Apr 22	Loyola Marymount*	Allie P. Reynolds Stadium • Stillwater, OK	L 7–10	33–12	
Apr 23	at Oklahoma City*	Jim Wade Stadium • Oklahoma City, OK	W 10–0	34–12	
Apr 25	Oklahoma	Allie P. Reynolds Stadium • Stillwater, OK	L 0–9	34–13	4–5
Apr 25	Oklahoma	Allie P. Reynolds Stadium • Stillwater, OK	W 13–5	35–13	5–5
Apr 26	Oklahoma	Allie P. Reynolds Stadium • Stillwater, OK	L 3–5	35–14	5–6
Apr 26	Oklahoma	Allie P. Reynolds Stadium • Stillwater, OK	W 9–4	36–14	6–6
Apr 29	at Wichita State*	Eck Stadium • Wichita, KS	W 9–4	37–14	

May
Date	Opponent	Site/stadium	Score	Overall record	Big 8 record
May 2	at Iowa State	Cap Timm Field • Ames, IA	W 5–2	38–14	7–6
May 2	at Iowa State	Cap Timm Field • Ames, IA	W 9–4	39–14	8–6
May 3	at Iowa State	Cap Timm Field • Ames, IA	W 7–6	40–14	9–6
May 3	at Iowa State	Cap Timm Field • Ames, IA	W 7–2	41–14	10–6
May 11	Nebraska	Allie P. Reynolds Stadium • Stillwater, OK	W 3–2	42–14	11–6
May 11	Nebraska	Allie P. Reynolds Stadium • Stillwater, OK	W 4–3	43–14	12–6

Postseason

Big Eight Tournament
Date	Opponent	Site/stadium	Score	Overall record	Big 8 T Record
May 14	Kansas	All Sports Stadium • Oklahoma City, OK	W 5–0	44–14	1–0
May 15	Nebraska	All Sports Stadium • Oklahoma City, OK	W 7–5	45–14	2–0
May 18	Nebraska	All Sports Stadium • Oklahoma City, OK	L 2–5	45–15	2–1
May 18	Nebraska	All Sports Stadium • Oklahoma City, OK	W 3–1	46–15	3–1

NCAA Midwest Regional
Date	Opponent	Site/stadium	Score	Overall record	NCAAT record
May 22	Oral Roberts	J. L. Johnson Stadium • Tulsa, OK	W 4–3	47–15	1–0
May 23	Southern Illinois	J. L. Johnson Stadium • Tulsa, OK	W 9–4	48–15	2–0
May 24	Oral Roberts	J. L. Johnson Stadium • Tulsa, OK	W 8–5	49–15	3–0

College World Series
Date	Opponent	Site/stadium	Score	Overall record	CWS record
May 31	South Carolina	Johnny Rosenblatt Stadium • Omaha, NE	W 8–5^{10}	50–15	1–0
June 2	Miami (FL)	Johnny Rosenblatt Stadium • Omaha, NE	W 12–6	51–15	2–0
June 4	Arizona State	Johnny Rosenblatt Stadium • Omaha, NE	W 11–10^{13}	52–15	3–0
June 6	Texas	Johnny Rosenblatt Stadium • Omaha, NE	L 8–15^{13}	52–16	3–1
June 8	Arizona State	Johnny Rosenblatt Stadium • Omaha, NE	L 4–7	52–17	3–2
