= 1981 Texas Longhorns baseball team =

American college baseball season

1981 Texas Longhorns baseball

NCAA Central Regional champions SWC tournament champions SWC champions

College World Series, 3–2
- Conference: Southwest Conference
- Record: 61–11–1 (16–5 SWC)
- Head coach: Cliff Gustafson (14th year)
- Home stadium: Disch–Falk Field

1981 Southwest Conference baseball standings
	Conf.						Overall
Team	W		L		T	PCT	W		L		T	PCT
No. 3 Texas ‍†‍‡‍^{y}	16	–	5	–	1	.750	61	–	11	–	0	.847
Arkansas ‍‍‍	12	–	9	–	0	.571	31	–	21	–	0	.596
Houston ‍‍‍	11	–	9	–	0	.550	32	–	20	–	0	.615
Rice ‍‍‍	11	–	10	–	0	.524	34	–	23	–	0	.596
Texas A&M ‍‍‍	10	–	10	–	0	.500	35	–	16	–	0	.686
TCU ‍‍‍	9	–	12	–	0	.429	27	–	19	–	0	.587
Texas Tech ‍‍‍	8	–	13	–	0	.381	26	–	21	–	0	.553
Baylor ‍‍‍	6	–	15	–	0	.286	21	–	24	–	0	.467
† – Conference champion ‡ – Tournament champion y – Invited to the NCAA tournament As of June 30, 1981; Rankings from Collegiate Baseball

The 1981 Texas Longhorns baseball team represented the University of Texas at Austin in the 1981 NCAA Division I baseball season. The Longhorns played their home games at Disch–Falk Field. The team was coached by Cliff Gustafson in his 14th season at Texas.

The Longhorns reached the College World Series, finishing third with wins over Michigan, Miami (FL) and eventual runner-up Oklahoma State and a pair of losses to eventual champion Arizona State.

== Personnel ==
=== Roster ===
1981 Texas Longhorns roster
Pitchers: 14 - Kirk Killingsworth; 17 - Tony Arnold; 25 - Calvin Schiraldi; 8 - Mike Hamer; Catchers: 12 - Burk Goldthorn	Infielders: 1 - Spike Owen; 5 - Mike Brumley; 9 - Chris Campbell; 24 - Randy Day; Outfielders: 31 - Tracy Dophied; 11 - Paul Martin	Unknown: 2 - Bryan Burrows; 4 - Milo Choate; 6 - Larry Long; 7 - Robert Culley; 8 - Mike Hamer; 11 - Mike Livermore; 13 - Mark Reynolds; 15 - Michael Zatopec; 21 - Michael Withrow; 22 - Tim Reynolds; 23 - David Seiler; 28 - Randy Richards; 29 - John Machin; 33 - Mike Simon; 34 - Jimmy D. Tompkins

== Schedule and results ==
Legend
Texas win
Texas loss
Tie

1981 Texas Longhorns baseball game log
Regular season

February
Date	Opponent	Site/stadium	Score	Overall record	SWC record
Feb 21	Texas Lutheran*	Disch–Falk Field • Austin, TX	W 10–0	1–0	
Feb 21	Texas Lutheran*	Disch–Falk Field • Austin, TX	W 10–1	2–0	
Feb 25	St. Mary's*	Disch–Falk Field • Austin, TX	W 5–1	3–0	
Feb 25	St. Mary's*	Disch–Falk Field • Austin, TX	W 1–0	4–0	
Feb 27	Lubbock Christian*	Disch–Falk Field • Austin, TX	W 6–	5–0	
Feb 27	Lubbock Christian*	Disch–Falk Field • Austin, TX	L 3–6	5–1	
Feb 28	Lubbock Christian*	Disch–Falk Field • Austin, TX	W 11–5	6–1	
Feb 28	Lubbock Christian*	Disch–Falk Field • Austin, TX	W 13–3	7–1	

March
Date	Opponent	Site/stadium	Score	Overall record	SWC record
Mar 4	Oral Roberts*	Disch–Falk Field • Austin, TX	W 11–1	8–1	
Mar 4	Oral Roberts*	Disch–Falk Field • Austin, TX	T 10–10	8–1–1	
Mar 5	Hardin–Simmons*	Disch–Falk Field • Austin, TX	W 9–0	9–1–1	
Mar 5	Hardin–Simmons*	Disch–Falk Field • Austin, TX	W 17–2	10–1–1	
Mar 6	Texas Wesleyan*	Disch–Falk Field • Austin, TX	W 6–5	11–1–1	
Mar 6	Texas Wesleyan*	Disch–Falk Field • Austin, TX	W 14–8	12–1–1	
Mar 8	Lamar*	Disch–Falk Field • Austin, TX	W 5–2	13–1–1	
Mar 8	Lamar*	Disch–Falk Field • Austin, TX	L 4–8	13–2–1	
Mar 9	Lamar*	Disch–Falk Field • Austin, TX	W 4–0	14–2–1	
Mar 9	Lamar*	Disch–Falk Field • Austin, TX	W 5–1	15–2–1	
Mar 13	Texas Tech	Disch–Falk Field • Austin, TX	W 17–3	16–2–1	1–0
Mar 14	Texas Tech	Disch–Falk Field • Austin, TX	W 5–1	17–2–1	2–0
Mar 14	Texas Tech	Disch–Falk Field • Austin, TX	W 7–6	18–2–1	3–0
Mar 16	Emporia State*	Disch–Falk Field • Austin, TX	W 3–1	19–2–1	
Mar 16	Emporia State*	Disch–Falk Field • Austin, TX	W 10–4	20–2–1	
Mar 17	Emporia State*	Disch–Falk Field • Austin, TX	W 1–0	21–2–1	
Mar 17	Emporia State*	Disch–Falk Field • Austin, TX	W 17–6	22–2–1	
Mar 18	Midwestern State*	Disch–Falk Field • Austin, TX	W 7–4	23–2–1	
Mar 18	Midwestern State*	Disch–Falk Field • Austin, TX	W 17–5	24–2–1	
Mar 19	Southwestern*	Disch–Falk Field • Austin, TX	W 11–2	25–2–1	
Mar 19	Southwestern*	Disch–Falk Field • Austin, TX	W 11–3	26–2–1	
Mar 20	Texas–Arlington*	Disch–Falk Field • Austin, TX	W 9–1	27–2–1	
Mar 20	Texas–Arlington*	Disch–Falk Field • Austin, TX	L 1–6	27–3–1	
Mar 21	Texas–Arlington*	Disch–Falk Field • Austin, TX	W 8–7	28–3–1	
Mar 21	Texas–Arlington*	Disch–Falk Field • Austin, TX	W 14–5	29–3–1	
Mar 23	Minnesota*	Disch–Falk Field • Austin, TX	W 6–5	30–3–1	
Mar 23	Minnesota*	Disch–Falk Field • Austin, TX	W 10–6	31–3–1	
Mar 24	Minnesota*	Disch–Falk Field • Austin, TX	W 8–3	32–3–1	
Mar 24	Minnesota*	Disch–Falk Field • Austin, TX	W 6–1	33–3–1	
Mar 27	Houston	Disch–Falk Field • Austin, TX	W 8–7	34–3–1	4–0
Mar 28	Houston	Disch–Falk Field • Austin, TX	W 7–6^{8}	35–3–1	5–0
Mar 28	Houston	Disch–Falk Field • Austin, TX	W 4–3	36–3–1	6–0

April
Date	Opponent	Site/stadium	Score	Overall record	SWC record
Apr 3	at Arkansas	George Cole Field • Fayetteville, AR	L 0–7	36–4–1	6–1
Apr 4	at Arkansas	George Cole Field • Fayetteville, AR	W 5–4	37–4–1	7–1
Apr 4	at Arkansas	George Cole Field • Fayetteville, AR	W 8–6	38–4–1	8–1
Apr 7	San Antonio Dodgers*	Disch–Falk Field • Austin, TX	W 6–3	(Exh.)	
Apr 10	TCU	Disch–Falk Field • Austin, TX	W 8–0	39–4–1	9–1
Apr 11	TCU	Disch–Falk Field • Austin, TX	W 7–3	40–4–1	10–1
Apr 11	TCU	Disch–Falk Field • Austin, TX	W 15–2	41–4–1	11–1
Apr 17	at Baylor	Ferrell Field • Waco, TX	W 6–4	42–4–1	12–1
Apr 18	at Baylor	Ferrell Field • Waco, TX	L 4–6	42–5–1	12–2
Apr 19	at Baylor	Ferrell Field • Waco, TX	W 13–6	43–5–1	13–2
Apr 21	Texas Wesleyan*	Disch–Falk Field • Austin, TX	W 4–1	44–5–1	
Apr 21	Texas Wesleyan*	Disch–Falk Field • Austin, TX	W 21–8	45–5–1	
Apr 24	Rice	Disch–Falk Field • Austin, TX	W 8–1	46–5–1	14–2
Apr 25	Rice	Disch–Falk Field • Austin, TX	W 4–1	47–5–1	15–2
Apr 25	Rice	Disch–Falk Field • Austin, TX	L 3–7	47–6–1	15–3

May
Date	Opponent	Site/stadium	Score	Overall record	SWC record
May 1	at Texas A&M	Olsen Field • College Station, TX	W 4–1	48–6–1	16–3
May 2	at Texas A&M	Olsen Field • College Station, TX	L 2–4	48–7–1	16–4
May 2	at Texas A&M	Olsen Field • College Station, TX	L 5–13	48–8–1	16–5
May 9	Lubbock Christian*	Disch–Falk Field • Austin, TX	W 4–1	49–8–1	
May 9	Lubbock Christian*	Disch–Falk Field • Austin, TX	W 10–6	50–8–1	
May 10	Lubbock Christian*	Disch–Falk Field • Austin, TX	W 9–2	51–8–1	
May 10	Lubbock Christian*	Disch–Falk Field • Austin, TX	W 10–4	52–8–1	

Postseason

SWC Tournament
Date	Opponent	Site/stadium	Score	Overall record	SWCT Record
May 15	Rice	Disch–Falk Field • Austin, TX	W 7–^{20}	53–8–1	1–0
May 16	Houston	Disch–Falk Field • Austin, TX	W 9–3	54–8–1	2–0
May 17	Arkansas	Disch–Falk Field • Austin, TX	W 11–1	55–8–1	3–0

NCAA Central Regional
Date	Opponent	Site/stadium	Score	Overall record	NCAAT record
May 22	BYU	Disch–Falk Field • Austin, TX	W 11–4	56–8–1	1–0
May 23	Lamar	Disch–Falk Field • Austin, TX	W 3–2	57–8–1	2–0
May 26	Stanford	Disch–Falk Field • Austin, TX	L 8–9	57–9–1	2–1
May 26	Stanford	Disch–Falk Field • Austin, TX	W 10–2	58–9–1	3–1

College World Series
Date	Opponent	Site/stadium	Score	Overall record	CWS record
May 30	Arizona State	Johnny Rosenblatt Stadium • Omaha, NE	L 2–11	58–10–1	0–1
June 2	Michigan	Johnny Rosenblatt Stadium • Omaha, NE	W 6–5	59–10–1	1–1
June 4	Miami (FL)	Johnny Rosenblatt Stadium • Omaha, NE	W 5–4	60–10–1	2–1
June 6	Oklahoma State	Johnny Rosenblatt Stadium • Omaha, NE	W 15–8^{15}	61–10–1	3–1
June 7	Arizona State	Johnny Rosenblatt Stadium • Omaha, NE	L 3–12	61–11–1	3–2
