= Jeff Keener =

American baseball player (born 1959)

- Pitcher
- Born: January 14, 1959 (age 67); Pana, Illinois, U.S.
- Batted: Left Threw: Right

MLB debut
- June 8, 1982, for the St. Louis Cardinals

Last MLB appearance
- September 27, 1983, for the St. Louis Cardinals

MLB statistics
- Games pitched: 23
- Win–loss record: 1–1
- Earned run average: 2.70
- Strikeouts: 29
- Stats at Baseball Reference

Teams
- St. Louis Cardinals (1982–1983)

Jeffrey Bruce Keener (born January 14, 1959) is an American former Major League Baseball player who appeared as a relief pitcher in two seasons for the St. Louis Cardinals.

== Baseball career ==
Drafted from the University of Kentucky in the seventh round of the 1981 Major League Baseball Amateur Draft, Keener quickly progressed through the Cardinals' minor league system.

Keener made his Major League debut at the age of 23 on June 8, 1982, at Montreal's Olympic Stadium against the Cardinals National League East rivals, the Montreal Expos. Keener retired all four batters, two of them on strikeouts, en route to a 5-4 Cardinal victory. In a total of 19 appearances during the 1982 season, he compiled an earned run average (ERA) of 1.61, with 25 strikeouts, 22 walks, and a record of one win, one loss and no saves. Keener batted left-handed and threw right-handed.

During the 1983 season, Keener appeared in just four games with the Cardinals, posting an ERA of 8.31. His final appearance, September 27, 1983, marked his final game in the Major Leagues.

Despite his short tenure in the big leagues, Keener is remembered for his unusual submarine delivery, with which he threw pitches with a sidearm/underarm motion, rather than over the shoulder.

== After baseball ==
After his baseball career ended, Keener returned to college, graduating from the University of Kentucky with a bachelor's degree in education, and attaining a master's degree in education from Southern Illinois University Carbondale. In 2003, he became the first baseball player inducted into the Southeastern Illinois College Hall of Fame.

Following his stints as baseball coach and physical education instructor, Keener became the principal of General John A. Logan Elementary School in Murphysboro, Illinois in 2008. After that, he became assistant principal at Murphysboro High School In 2010 and later was named as the principal for Murphysboro Middle School.

== Private life ==
Keener has three children.
