= Tony Arnold (baseball) =

American baseball player (born 1959)

- Relief pitcher
- Born: May 3, 1959 (age 66); El Paso, Texas, U.S.
- Batted: Right Threw: Right

MLB debut
- August 9, 1986, for the Baltimore Orioles

Last MLB appearance
- October 3, 1987, for the Baltimore Orioles

MLB statistics
- Win–loss record: 0–2
- Earned run average: 5.06
- Strikeouts: 25
- Stats at Baseball Reference

Teams
- Baltimore Orioles (1986–1987)

Tony Dale Arnold (born May 3, 1959) is a former Major League Baseball pitcher.

Arnold's played high school baseball at Irving High School in Irving, Texas. He played college baseball at the University of Texas at Austin, where he was selected as a 1981 College Baseball All-American. His 21 consecutive victories is tied for seventh in Division I college baseball as of 2014.

He made his MLB debut in 1986 with the Baltimore Orioles and played his final game in 1987. He is currently the pitching coach for the Lynchburg Hillcats, the Single-A affiliate of the Cleveland Guardians.
