= 1981 NCAA Division I baseball rankings =

1981 NCAA Division I baseball season

Tournament

College World Series
- Champions: Arizona State
- Runners-up: Oklahoma State
- MOP: Stan Holmes (Arizona State)

Seasons
- ← 1980 1982 →

The following polls make up the 1981 NCAA Division I baseball rankings. Baseball America began publishing its poll of the top 20 teams in college baseball in 1981. Collegiate Baseball Newspaper published its first human poll of the top 20 teams in college baseball in 1957, and expanded to rank the top 30 teams in 1961. This was the first season with two major polls.

== Baseball America ==
Currently, only the final poll from the 1981 season is available.

Rank	Team
1	Arizona State
2	Miami (FL)
3	Texas
4	Oklahoma State
5	Oral Roberts
6	South Carolina
7	Cal State Fullerton
8	Mississippi State
9	San Diego State
10	Stanford
11	Wichita State
12	Michigan
13	Florida
14	Florida State
15	Hawaii
16	Missouri
17	Alabama
18	Memphis
19	St. John's
20	Virginia Tech

== Collegiate Baseball ==
Currently, only the final poll from the 1981 season is available.

Rank	Team
1	Arizona State
2	Oklahoma State
3	Texas
4	South Carolina
5	Miami (FL)
6	Mississippi State
7	Maine
8	Michigan
9	Cal State Fullerton
10	Oral Roberts
11	Memphis
12	East Michigan
13	Stanford
14	St. John's
15	Florida
16	Florida State
17	East Tennessee State
18	Lamar
19	BYU
20	Fresno State
21	Hawaii
22	Southern Illinois
23	New Orleans
24	James Madison
25	San Diego State
26	Wichita State
27	Central Michigan
28	Gonzaga
29	Virginia Tech
30	Missouri
