= 1981 Maine Black Bears baseball team =

1981 Maine Black Bears baseball

ECAC New England baseball tournament champion NCAA Northeast Regional champion

College World Series, 0–2
- Conference: Independent
- Record: 32–14
- Head coach: John Winkin (7th season)

The 1981 Maine Black Bears baseball team represented the University of Maine in the 1981 NCAA Division I baseball season. The Black Bears were led by John Winkin in his 7th year as head coach, and played as an Independent. The Black Bears competed in the Eastern College Athletic Conference New England Tournament, which had an automatic bid to the NCAA Tournament.

Maine posted a 32–14 record and won the Eastern College Athletic Conference New England Tournament to claim the automatic bid to the 1981 NCAA Division I baseball tournament. They swept the Northeast Regional to advance to the 1981 College World Series, their third appearance in Omaha. The Black Bears were eliminated after losses to Miami (FL) and South Carolina.

== Personnel ==
=== Roster ===
1981 Maine Black Bears baseball roster
Pitchers: 6 - John Balerna - Junior; 11 - Stu Lacognata - Freshman; 17 - Don Mason - Senior; 18 - Joe Johnson - Sophomore; 22 - Dickie Whitten - Sophomore; 27 - Bob Colford - Freshman; 29 - Don DeWolfe - Senior	Catchers: 25 - Ed Hackett - Freshman; 26 - Ed Pickett - Junior; Outfielders: 1 - Rick Lashua - Freshman; 2 - Brad Colton - Sophomore; 8 - Bill Swift - Freshman; 9 - Jim Foley - Senior; 24 - Tom Vanidestine - Sophomore; 28 - Kevin Buckley - Senior	Infielders: 3 - Jeff Paul - Freshman; 4 - Kevin Bernier - Sophomore; 7 - Pete Adams - Junior; 12 - John Tortorella - Senior; 19 - Mark Sutton - Junior; 20 - Mike Courts - Senior; 23 - Jon Perry - Senior

==== Coaches ====
1981 Maine Black Bears baseball coaching staff
- 5 - John Winkin - Head coach - 7th season
- 16 - Doug Carville - Assistant coach - 2nd season
- 31 - Brian Cox - Assistant coach - 2nd season

== Schedule ==
1981 Maine Black Bears baseball game log
Regular season

March
Date	Opponent	Site/stadium	Score	Overall record
	vs West Chester		L 4–12	0–1
	vs Southern Illinois		L 4–7	0–2
	vs FIU		L 0–15	0–3
Mar 17	at Miami (FL)	Mark Light Field • Coral Gables, FL	L 4–11	0–4
	vs Miami (OH)		W 15–11	1–4
	vs Southern Illinois		L 5–7	1–5
Mar 20	at Miami (FL)	Mark Light Field • Coral Gables, FL	L 10–15	1–6
Mar 21	vs Michigan	Mark Light Field • Coral Gables, FL	L 6–15	1–7
	vs Miami (OH)		W 7–5	2–7
Mar 22	at Miami (FL)	Mark Light Field • Coral Gables, FL	L 9–15	2–8
Mar 23	vs Michigan	Mark Light Field • Coral Gables, FL	W 15–10	3–8
	vs Bowling Green		W 11–2	4–8
Mar 25	at Miami (FL)	Mark Light Field • Coral Gables, FL	L 2–3	4–9
	vs Glassboro State		W 1–0	5–9
	vs Bowling Green		W 5–4	6–9
	at Fairfield	Alumni Baseball Diamond • Fairfield, CT	W 12–6	7–9
	at Fairfield	Alumni Baseball Diamond • Fairfield, CT	W 16–5	8–9

April/May
Date	Opponent	Site/stadium	Score	Overall record
Apr 4	at UMass	Earl Lorden Field • Amherst, MA	L 8–9	8–10
Apr 4	at UMass	Earl Lorden Field • Amherst, MA	W 11–4	9–10
	at Northeastern	Parsons Field • Brookline, MA	W 10–2	10–10
	at Providence	Hendricken Field • Providence, RI	W 2–1	11–10
	at Providence	Hendricken Field • Providence, RI	L 4–10	11–11
	at Vermont	Centennial Field • Burlington, VT	W 5–2	12–11
	at Vermont	Centennial Field • Burlington, VT	W 9–1	13–11
	Holy Cross	Orono, ME	W 11–3	14–11
Apr 22	Southern Maine	Orono, ME	W 18–1	15–11
Apr 22	Southern Maine	Orono, ME	W 5–2	16–11
	Boston College	Orono, ME	W 15–4	17–11
	Husson	Orono, ME	W 11–0	18–11
	Husson	Orono, ME	W 12–4	19–11
	at New Hampshire	Durham, NH	W 6–2	20–11
	at New Hampshire	Durham, NH	W 2–1	21–11
	St. Joseph's (ME)	Orono, ME	W 18–2	22–11
May 2	Connecticut	Orono, ME	W 5–4	23–11
May 2	Connecticut	Orono, ME	W 13–7	24–11
	at Colby	Coombs Field • Waterville, ME	W 6–1	25–11
	at Colby	Coombs Field • Waterville, ME	W 10–6	26–11

Postseason

ECAC New England baseball tournament
Date	Opponent	Site/stadium	Score	Overall record	ECACT record
	Providence	Fitton Field • Worcester, MA	W 10–2	27–11	1–0
	Vermont	Fitton Field • Worcester, MA	W 7–2	28–11	2–0
	Vermont	Fitton Field • Worcester, MA	W 12–8	29–11	3–0

NCAA Northeast Regional
Date	Opponent	Site/stadium	Score	Overall record	NCAAT record
May 21	Central Michigan	Yale Field • New Haven, CT	W 10–2	30–11	1–0
May 22	St. John's	Yale Field • New Haven, CT	W 10–5	31–11	2–0
May 23	St. John's	Yale Field • New Haven, CT	L 5–10	31–12	2–1
May 24	St. John's	Yale Field • New Haven, CT	W 15–10	32–12	3–1

College World Series
Date	Opponent	Site/stadium	Score	Overall record	CWS record
June 11	Miami (FL)	Johnny Rosenblatt Stadium • Omaha, NE	L 1–6	32–13	0–1
June 12	South Carolina	Johnny Rosenblatt Stadium • Omaha, NE	L 7–12	32–14	0–2
