= Lemmie Miller =

American baseball player (born 1960)

- Outfielder
- Born: June 2, 1960 (age 65); Dallas, Texas, U.S.
- Batted: Right Threw: Right

MLB debut
- May 22, 1984, for the Los Angeles Dodgers

Last MLB appearance
- June 2, 1984, for the Los Angeles Dodgers

MLB statistics
- Batting average: .167
- Home runs: 0
- Runs: 0
- Stats at Baseball Reference

Teams
- Los Angeles Dodgers (1984)

Lemmie Earl Miller (born June 2, 1960) is an American former professional baseball outfielder. He appeared in eight games for the Los Angeles Dodgers of Major League Baseball (MLB) during the 1984 baseball season. Miller later moved to the Rockford, Illinois area, married and was assistant coach of the Kishwaukee College men's baseball team.
