= 1981 Miami Hurricanes baseball team =

American college baseball season

1981 Miami Hurricanes baseball

NCAA South Regional champions

College World Series, 1–2
- Conference: Independent
- Record: 61–10
- Head coach: Ron Fraser (19th year)
- Home stadium: Mark Light Field

The 1981 Miami Hurricanes baseball team represented the University of Miami in the 1981 NCAA Division I baseball season. The Hurricanes played their home games at Mark Light Field. The team was coached by Ron Fraser in his 19th season at Miami.

The Hurricanes reached the College World Series, where they were eliminated after recording a win against Maine and losses to eventual runner-up Oklahoma State and third-place Texas.

== Personnel ==
=== Roster ===
1981 Miami Hurricanes roster
Pitchers: Mike Browning; Neal Heaton; Mike Kasprzak; Jeff Morrison; Danny Smith; Sam Sorce; Catchers: Frank Castro	Infielders: Alex DeJesus; Calvin James; Mike Pagliarulo; Mitch Seoane; Bill Wrona; Outfielders: Tom Gil; Mike Kutner; Scott Parsons; Doug Shields; Mickey Williams	Unknown: Tony Barquin; Rob Biagini; Terry Gallagher; Bert Jordan; Norm Kirkpatrick; Mike Maude; Charlie Pagliarulo; Brian Silvas

=== Coaches ===
1981 Miami Hurricanes baseball coaching staff
- Ron Fraser – Head coach – 19th year

== Schedule and results ==
Legend
Miami win
Miami loss

1981 Miami Hurricanes baseball game log
Regular season

February
Date	Opponent	Site/stadium	Score	Overall record
Feb 6	Southern California	Mark Light Field • Coral Gables, FL	W 7–6	1–0
Feb 7	Southern California	Mark Light Field • Coral Gables, FL	W 6–3	2–0
Feb 8	Southern California	Mark Light Field • Coral Gables, FL	W 10–9	3–0
Feb 20	Florida	Mark Light Field • Coral Gables, FL	W 8–5	4–0
Feb 21	Florida	Mark Light Field • Coral Gables, FL	W 2–0	5–0
Feb 25	Biscayne	Mark Light Field • Coral Gables, FL	W 5–3	6–0
Feb 28	South Florida	Mark Light Field • Coral Gables, FL	W 13–2	7–0

March
Date	Opponent	Site/stadium	Score	Overall record
Mar 1	South Florida	Mark Light Field • Coral Gables, FL	W 9–2	8–0
Mar 1	South Florida	Mark Light Field • Coral Gables, FL	W 17–3	9–0
Mar 2	St. Joseph's	Mark Light Field • Coral Gables, FL	W 14–4	10–0
Mar 3	St. Joseph's	Mark Light Field • Coral Gables, FL	W 11–0	11–0
Mar 4	St. Joseph's	Mark Light Field • Coral Gables, FL	W 15–7	12–0
Mar 6	Florida State	Mark Light Field • Coral Gables, FL	W 4–3^{10}	13–0
Mar 7	Florida State	Mark Light Field • Coral Gables, FL	W 10–8	14–0
Mar 8	Florida State	Mark Light Field • Coral Gables, FL	W 19–4	15–0
Mar 9	George Washington	Mark Light Field • Coral Gables, FL	W 6–3	16–0
Mar 10	Indiana State	Mark Light Field • Coral Gables, FL	W 2–0	17–0
Mar 11	Indiana State	Mark Light Field • Coral Gables, FL	W 16–1	18–0
Mar 12	Indiana State	Mark Light Field • Coral Gables, FL	W 9–4	19–0
Mar 13	Southern Illinois	Mark Light Field • Coral Gables, FL	W 5–0	20–0
Mar 14	Southern Illinois	Mark Light Field • Coral Gables, FL	W 6–4	21–0
Mar 16	Miami (OH)	Mark Light Field • Coral Gables, FL	L 1–4	21–1
Mar 17	Maine	Mark Light Field • Coral Gables, FL	W 11–4	22–1
Mar 18	Southern Illinois	Mark Light Field • Coral Gables, FL	W 11–5	23–1
Mar 19	Miami (OH)	Mark Light Field • Coral Gables, FL	W 6–0	24–1
Mar 20	Maine	Mark Light Field • Coral Gables, FL	W 15–10	25–1
Mar 21	Southern Illinois	Mark Light Field • Coral Gables, FL	W 7–4	26–1
Mar 22	Maine	Mark Light Field • Coral Gables, FL	W 15–9	27–1
Mar 23	Bowling Green	Mark Light Field • Coral Gables, FL	W 12–0	28–1
Mar 24	Michigan	Mark Light Field • Coral Gables, FL	W 3–2^{10}	29–1
Mar 25	Maine	Mark Light Field • Coral Gables, FL	30–1	
Mar 27	Michigan	Mark Light Field • Coral Gables, FL	W 12–3	31–1
Mar 28	Michigan	Mark Light Field • Coral Gables, FL	W 10–3	32–1
Mar 29	Bowling Green	Mark Light Field • Coral Gables, FL	W 8–1	33–1

April
Date	Opponent	Site/stadium	Score	Overall record
Apr 3	Jacksonville	Mark Light Field • Coral Gables, FL	W 1–0	34–1
Apr 4	Jacksonville	Mark Light Field • Coral Gables, FL	W 4–0	35–1
Apr 4	Jacksonville	Mark Light Field • Coral Gables, FL	W 9–6	36–1
Apr 5	Florida A&M	Mark Light Field • Coral Gables, FL	W 21–3	37–1
Apr 6	Baltimore Orioles	Mark Light Field • Coral Gables, FL	L 2–16	
Apr 8	at Stetson	Conrad Park • DeLand, FL	W 6–5	38–1
Apr 8	at Stetson	Conrad Park • DeLand, FL	W 5–3	39–1
Apr 9	at Stetson	Conrad Park • DeLand, FL	L 3–9	39–2
Apr 11	at South Florida	Red McEwen Field • Tampa, FL	L 3–4	39–3
Apr 11	at South Florida	Red McEwen Field • Tampa, FL	W 6–5	40–3
Apr 12	at South Florida	Red McEwen Field • Tampa, FL	W 7–2	41–3
Apr 13	Eckerd	Mark Light Field • Coral Gables, FL	W 7–2	42–3
Apr 14	Eckerd	Mark Light Field • Coral Gables, FL	L 9–10	42–4
Apr 17	FIU	Mark Light Field • Coral Gables, FL	W 4–2	43–4
Apr 22	Biscayne	Mark Light Field • Coral Gables, FL	W 5–3	44–4
Apr 24	FIU	Mark Light Field • Coral Gables, FL	W 8–7	45–4
Apr 28	Biscayne	Mark Light Field • Coral Gables, FL	L 2–4	45–5
Apr 29	Saint Leo	Mark Light Field • Coral Gables, FL	W 14–2	46–5
Apr 30	Saint Leo	Mark Light Field • Coral Gables, FL	W 8–1	47–5

May
Date	Opponent	Site/stadium	Score	Overall record
May 2	at Florida State	Seminole Field • Tallahassee, FL	W 3–2	48–5
May 3	at Florida State	Seminole Field • Tallahassee, FL	L 4–5	48–6
May 4	at Florida State	Seminole Field • Tallahassee, FL	W 4–3	49–6
May 5	at Florida A&M	Tallahassee, FL	L 1–2	49–7
May 5	at Florida A&M	Tallahassee, FL	W 3–2^{11}	50–7
May 6	at Florida	Perry Field • Gainesville, FL	L 7–8	50–8
May 7	at Florida	Perry Field • Gainesville, FL	W 11–4	51–8
May 8	FIU	Mark Light Field • Coral Gables, FL	W 4–0	52–8
May 11	at FIU	Miami, FL	W 8–5	53–8
May 13	at South Alabama	Eddie Stanky Field • Mobile, AL	W 3–0	54–8
May 14	at South Alabama	Eddie Stanky Field • Mobile, AL	W 4–1	55–8
May 15	at South Alabama	Eddie Stanky Field • Mobile, AL	W 5–2	56–8

Postseason

NCAA South Regional
Date	Opponent	Site/stadium	Score	Overall record	NCAAT record
May 21	Minnesota	Mark Light Field • Coral Gables, FL	W 12–0	57–8	1–0
May 22	Middle Tennessee State	Mark Light Field • Coral Gables, FL	W 2–0	58–8	2–0
May 23	Florida State	Mark Light Field • Coral Gables, FL	W 14–6	59–8	3–0
May 24	Florida	Mark Light Field • Coral Gables, FL	W 8–6	60–8	4–0

College World Series
Date	Opponent	Site/stadium	Score	Overall record	CWS record
May 31	Maine	Johnny Rosenblatt Stadium • Omaha, NE	W 6–1	61–8	1–0
June 2	Oklahoma State	Johnny Rosenblatt Stadium • Omaha, NE	L 6–12	61–9	1–1
June 4	Texas	Johnny Rosenblatt Stadium • Omaha, NE	L 4–5	61–10	1–2
