= Ray Fisher Stadium =

Baseball stadium in Ann Arbor, Michigan, USA

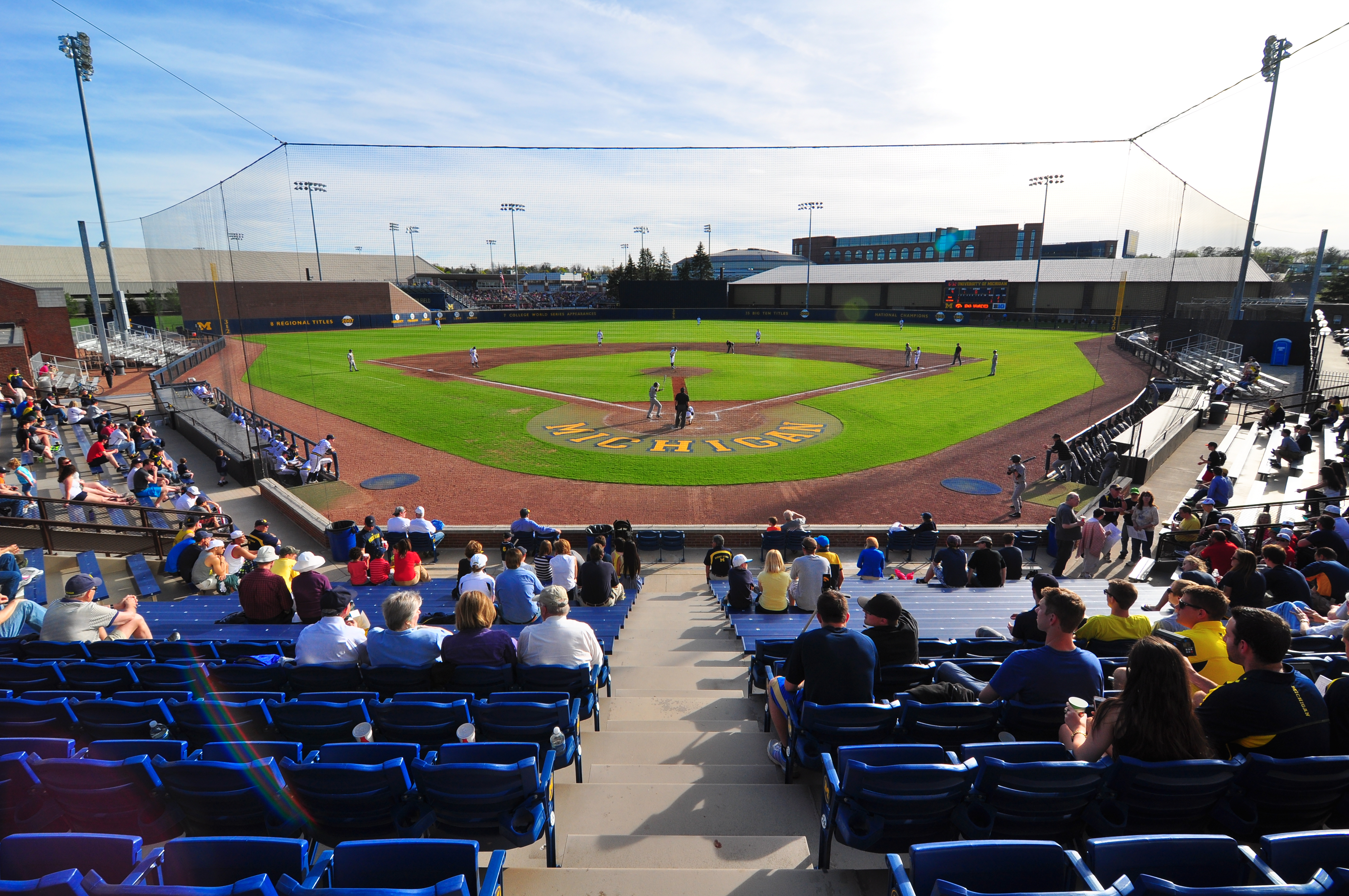
- Ray Fisher Stadium in Ann Arbor, Michigan

- 1 Ray Fisher Stadium (the United States)
- Full name: Wilpon Baseball and Softball Complex: Ray Fisher Stadium
- Former names: Ferry Field (1923–1948); Ray Fisher Stadium (1949–2008)
- Address: 1114 South State Street
- Location: Ann Arbor, Michigan
- Coordinates: 42°16′3″N 83°44′32″W
- Owner: University of Michigan
- Operator: University of Michigan
- Capacity: 4,000
- Type: Stadium
- Event: Baseball
- Surface: FieldTurf
- Scoreboard: Electronic

Construction
- Groundbreaking: 1921
- Built: 1921–1923
- Opened: April 21, 1923
- Renovated: 2008, 2015
- Architects: FGM Architects and Populous

Tenant
- Michigan Wolverines baseball (NCAA) (1923–present)

Website
- mgoblue.com/sports/2017/6/16/facilities-ray-fisher-stadium-html.aspx

Ray Fisher Stadium is a baseball stadium in Ann Arbor, Michigan. It is the home field of the University of Michigan Wolverines college baseball team.

The stadium holds 4,000 people and opened in 1923. Ray Fisher Stadium received extensive renovations and was reopened as part of the University's Wilpon Baseball and Softball Complex in 2008. The stadium's location was formerly known as Ferry Field prior to its dedication on May 23, 1970 as Ray Fisher Stadium. It is named for former Michigan baseball coach Ray Fisher who coached the University's baseball teams from 1921 through 1958.

In 2010, the Wolverines ranked 44th among Division I baseball programs in attendance, averaging 1,278 per home game, while the stadium holds 2,800 people.

The stadium has hosted ten Big Ten Conference baseball tournaments, in 1981, 1983, 1985, 1987, 1988, 1989, 1997, 2006, 2007 and 2008. Michigan won the tournament on its home field in 1981, 1983, 1987, 2006, and 2008. Jason DeMink the head Groundskeeper

== Gallery ==
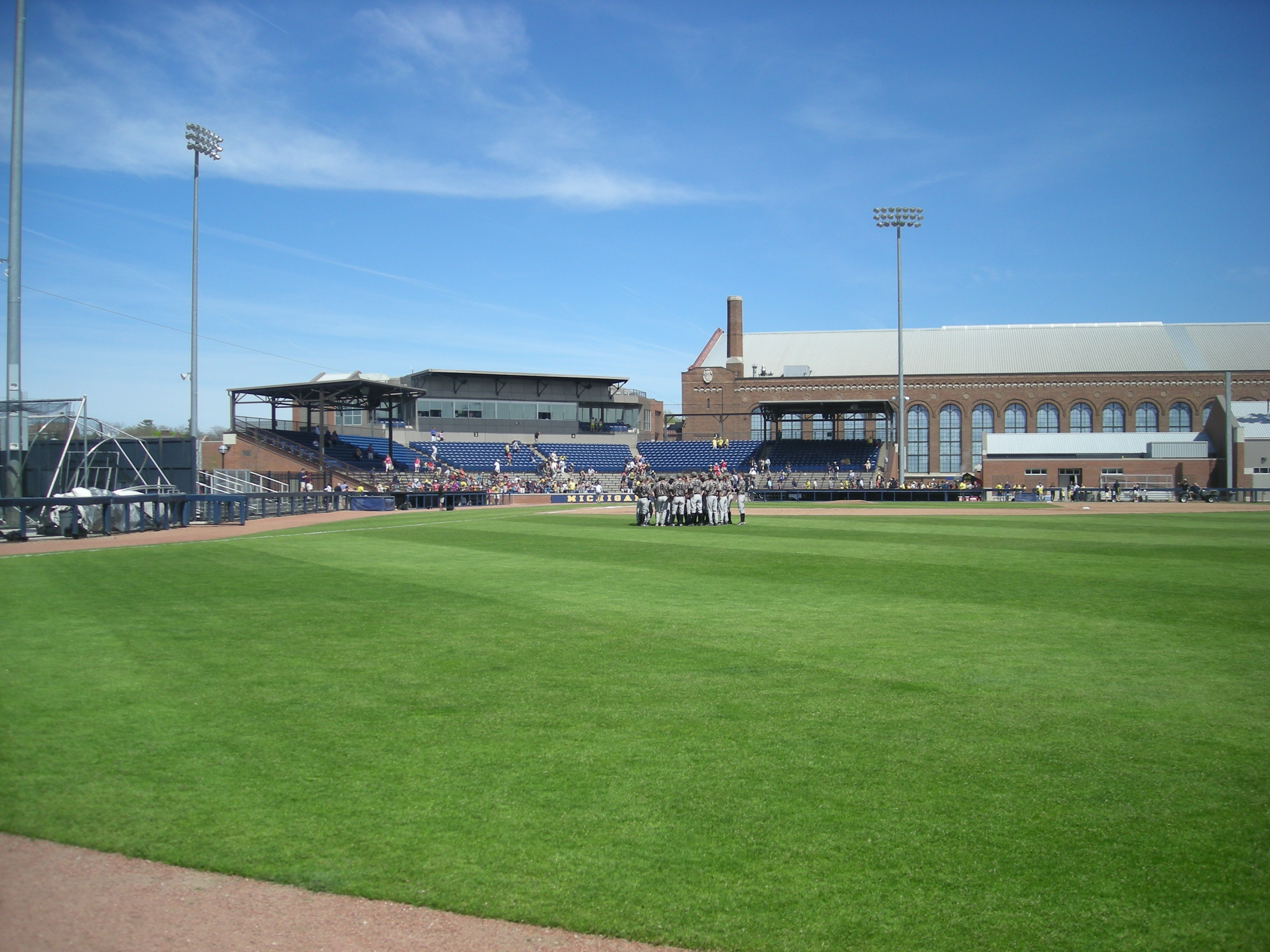
Ray Fisher Stadium viewed from right field

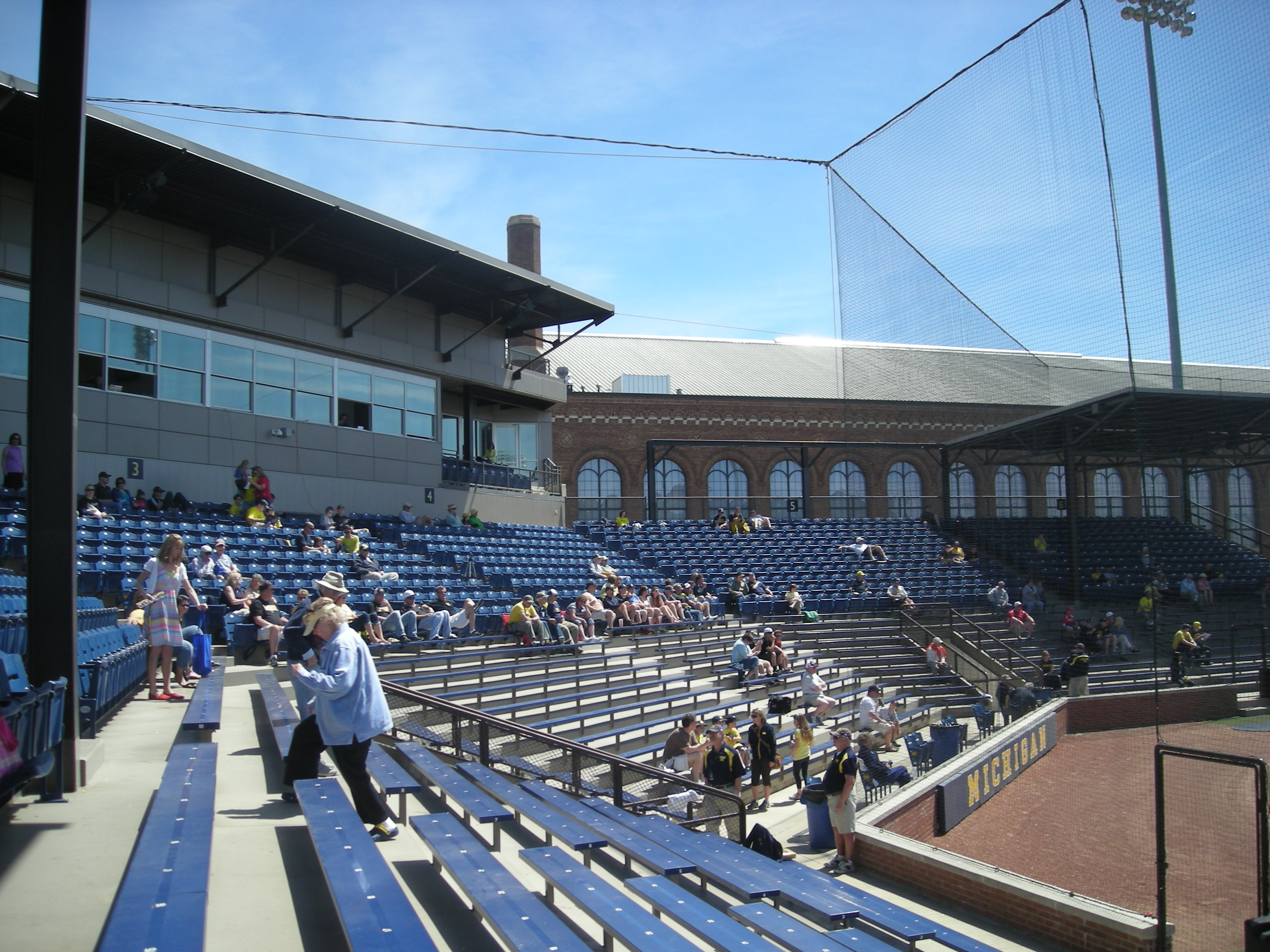
Seating behind home plate

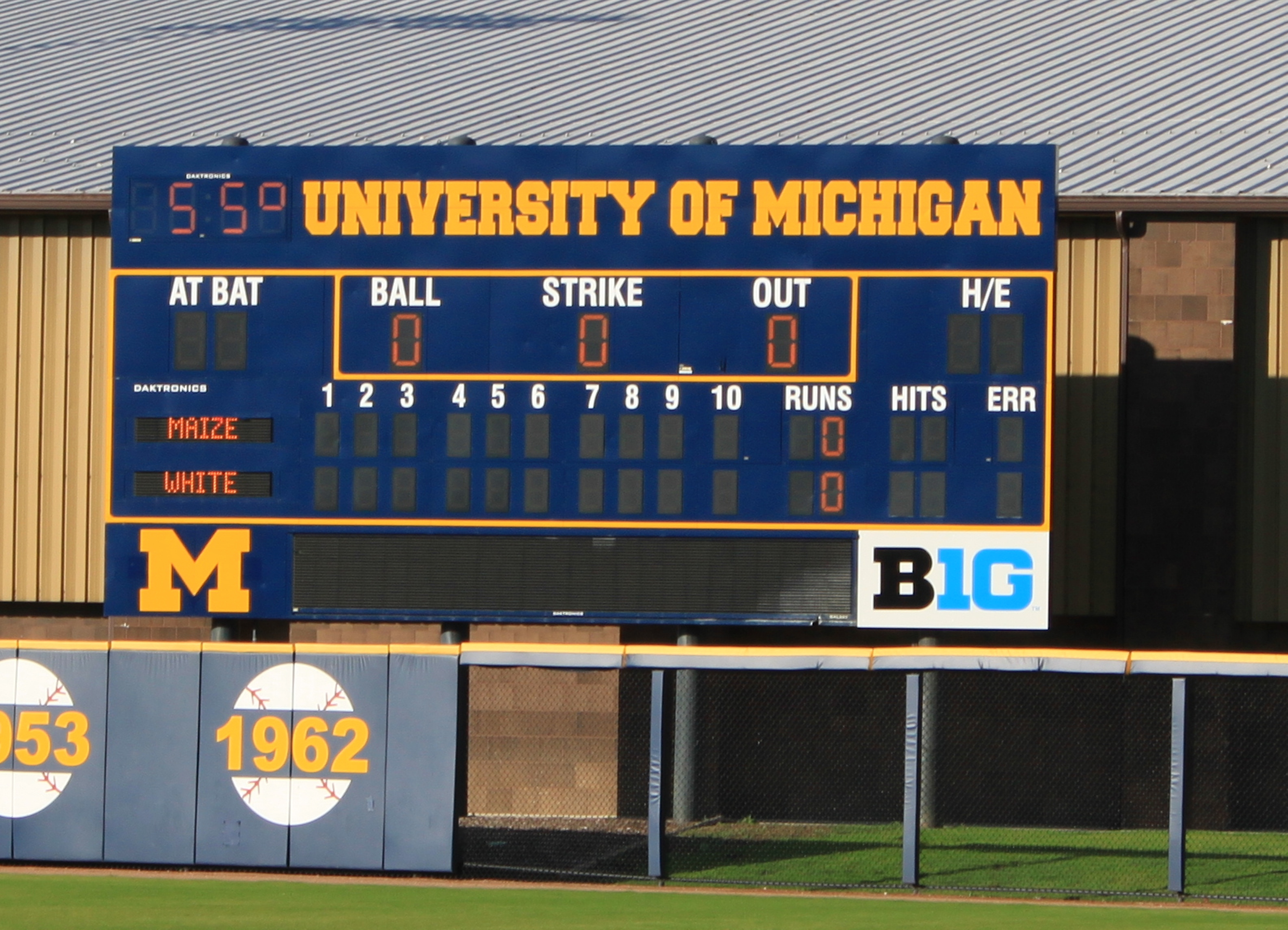
Ray Fisher Stadium scoreboard

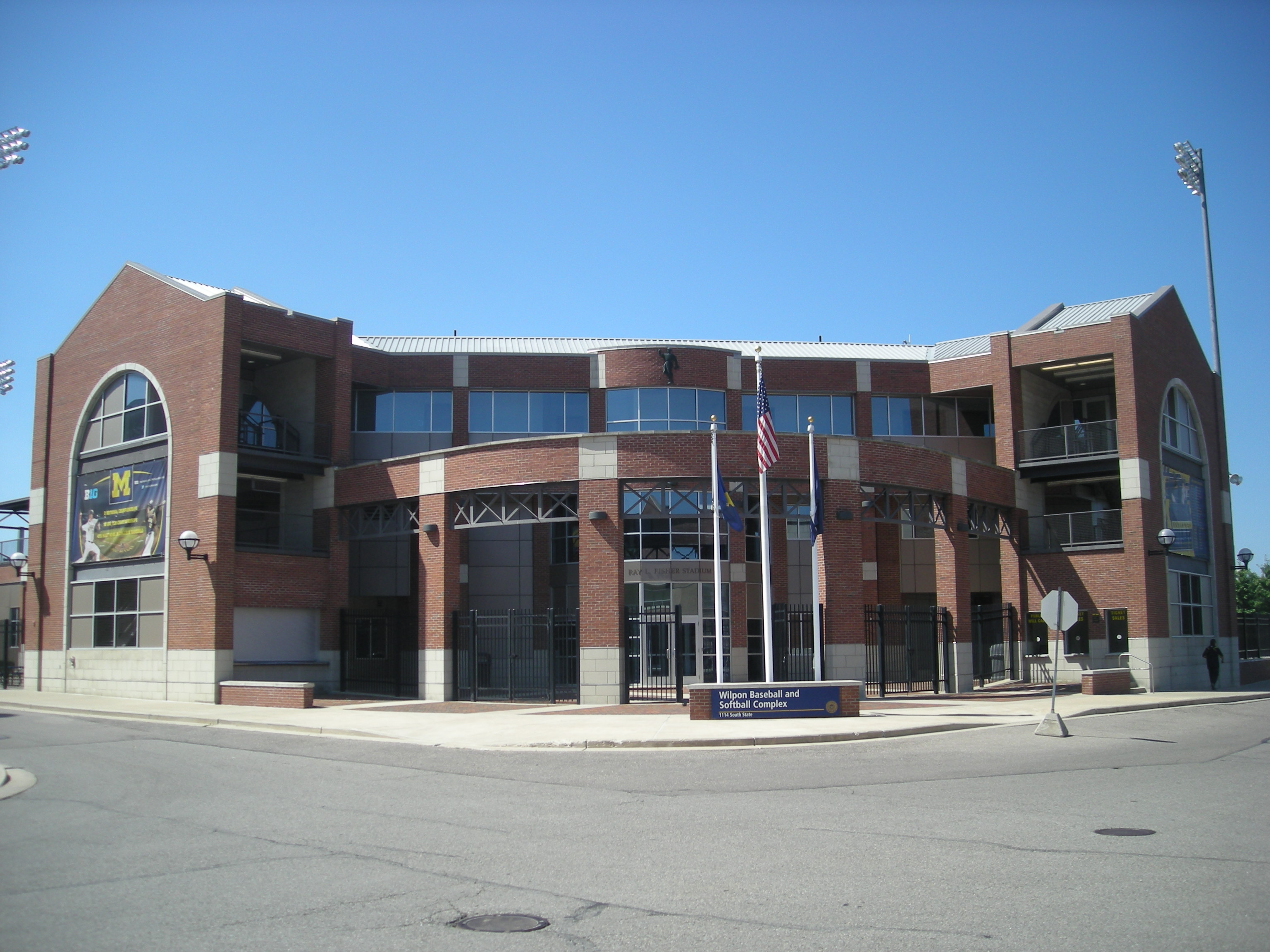
Exterior of Ray Fisher Stadium

== See also ==
- List of NCAA Division I baseball venues
