= Bud Middaugh =

American baseball coach

Biographical details
- Born: c. 1939

Playing career
- 1958–1961: Miami (OH)
- Position: Shortstop

Coaching career (HC unless noted)
- 1964–1966: Lorain Admiral King HS (OH)
- 1967: Miami (OH) (assistant)
- 1968–1979: Miami (OH)
- 1980–1989: Michigan

Head coaching record
- Overall: 824–319–1 (college); 52–14 (high school)

Forest L. "Bud" Middaugh (born c. 1939) is an American former baseball coach. He was the head baseball coach at Miami University in Oxford, Ohio from 1968 to 1979 and at the University of Michigan from 1980 to 1989. He compiled a record of 359–173 at Miami, leading the Redhawks to three Mid-American Conference championships and four appearances in the NCAA playoffs. In 1980, he became the head coach at Michigan. In ten years as the head coach at Michigan, he led the Michigan Wolverines baseball team to a 465–146–1 record, seven Big Ten Conference championships and four appearances in the College World Series. He developed several Major League Baseball players at Michigan, including Barry Larkin, Chris Sabo, Hal Morris, Scott Kamieniecki, and Jim Abbott. Middaugh resigned as Michigan's baseball coach in June 1989 after it was revealed that he had given money collected by selling programs at football games to members of the Michigan baseball team. Middaugh was inducted into the Miami University Hall of Fame in 1981. Middaugh began his coaching career at Lorain Admiral King High School in Lorain, Ohio. In three years at Admiral King, Middaugh compiled a record of 52–14 and coached his team to a Cleveland district championship and a Buckeye Conference championship.
