= 1981 NCAA Division I baseball tournament =

- Season: 1981
- Teams: 34
- Finals site: Johnny Rosenblatt Stadium; Omaha, NE
- Champions: Arizona State (5th title)
- Runner-up: Oklahoma State (9th CWS Appearance)
- Winning coach: Jim Brock (2nd title)
- MOP: Stan Holmes (Arizona State)

The 1981 NCAA Division I baseball tournament was played at the end of the 1981 NCAA Division I baseball season to determine the national champion of college baseball. The tournament concluded with eight teams competing in the College World Series, a double-elimination tournament in its thirty fifth year. Eight regional competitions were held to determine the participants in the final event. Seven regions held a four team, double-elimination tournament while one region included six teams, resulting in 34 teams participating in the tournament at the conclusion of their regular season, and in some cases, after a conference tournament. The thirty-fifth tournament's champion was Arizona State coached by Jim Brock. The Most Outstanding Player was Stan Holmes of Arizona State.

== Regionals ==
The opening rounds of the tournament were played across eight regional sites across the country, seven consisting of four teams and one of six teams. The winners of each Regional advanced to the College World Series.

Bold indicates winner.

=== Atlantic Regional at Clemson, SC ===
Upper round 1
**Mississippi State** | **7**
East Tennessee State | 6
**Wichita State** | **7**
Clemson | 2
Lower round 1
Clemson | 1
**East Tennessee State** | **2**

Upper final
**Mississippi State** | **5**
Wichita State | 1
Lower final
Wichita State | 4
**East Tennessee State** | **5**^{13}

Final
**Mississippi State** | **6** | —
East Tennessee State | 5 | —

=== Central Regional at Austin, TX ===
Upper round 1
**Lamar** | **6**
Stanford | 5
**Texas** | **11**
BYU | 4
Lower round 1
BYU | 1
**Stanford** | **2**

Upper final
Lamar | 2
**Texas** | **3**
Lower final
Lamar | 1
**Stanford** | **9**

Final
**Texas** | 8 | **10**
Stanford | **9** | 2

=== East Regional at Columbia, SC ===
Upper round 1
**Memphis** | **16**
James Madison | 3
**South Carolina** | **15**
Temple | 6
Lower round 1
Temple | 2
**James Madison** | **10**

Upper final
Memphis | 5
**South Carolina** | **8**
Lower final
**Memphis** | **8**
James Madison | 3

Final
**South Carolina** | **11** | —
Memphis | 5 | —

=== Mideast Regional at Ann Arbor, MI ===
Upper round 1
**New Orleans** | **2**
Michigan | 1
**Eastern Michigan** | **15**
UNLV | 3
Lower round 1
UNLV | 2
**Michigan** | **6**

Upper final
New Orleans | 11
**Eastern Michigan** | **18**
Lower final
New Orleans | 1
**Michigan** | **7**

Final
Eastern Michigan | 0 | 0
**Michigan** | **10** | **4**

=== Midwest Regional at Tulsa, OK ===
Upper round 1
**Southern Illinois** | **4**
San Diego State | 3
**Oklahoma State** | **4**
Oral Roberts | 3
Lower round 1
San Diego State | 1
**Oral Roberts** | **3**

Upper final
Southern Illinois | 4
**Oklahoma State** | **9**
Lower final
Southern Illinois | 2
**Oral Roberts** | **7**

Final
**Oklahoma State** | **8** | —
Oral Roberts | 5 | —

=== Northeast Regional at New Haven, CT ===
Upper round 1
**Maine** | **10**
Central Michigan | 2
**St. John's** | **1**^{12}
Yale | 0
Lower round 1
Yale | 2
**Central Michigan** | **7**

Upper final
**Maine** | **10**
St. John's | 5
Lower final
**St. John's** | **23**
Central Michigan | 13

Final
**Maine** | 5 | **15**
St. John's | **10** | 0

=== South Regional at Coral Gables, FL ===
First round
1 | **Florida State** | **5**
6 | Florida | 1
2 | **Middle Tennessee** | 4
5 | Missouri | 2
3 | **Miami (FL)** | **12**
4 | Minnesota | 0

Second round
**Florida State** | **9**
Minnesota | 5
Middle Tennessee | 0
**Miami (FL)** | **2**
Missouri | 3
**Florida** | **7**

Third round
Florida State | 6
**Miami (FL)** | **14**
Middle Tennessee | 4
**Florida** | **7**^{10}

Semifinals
Florida State | 4
**Florida** | **5**

Final
**Miami (FL)** | **8** | —
Florida | 6 | —

=== West Regional at Tempe, AZ ===
Upper round 1
**Cal State Fullerton** | **9**
Fresno State | 8
**Arizona State** | **9**
Gonzaga | 6
Lower round 1
Gonzaga | 8
**Fresno State** | **10**

Upper final
Cal State Fullerton | 9
**Arizona State** | **18**
Lower final
**Cal State Fullerton** | **10**
Fresno State | 9

Final
**Arizona State** | **12** | —
Cal State Fullerton | 7 | —

== College World Series ==
=== Participants ===
| School | Conference | Record (conference) | Head coach | CWS appearances | CWS best finish | CWS record |
|---|---|---|---|---|---|---|
| Arizona State | Pac-10 | 50–12 (26–4) | Jim Brock | 10 (last: 1978) | 1st (1965, 1967, 1969, 1977) | 37–16 |
| Maine | Eastern Collegiate | 32–12 (n/a) | John Winkin | 2 (last: 1976) | 3rd (1964) | 5–4 |
| Miami (FL) | n/a | 60–8 (n/a) | Ron Fraser | 4 (last: 1980) | 2nd (1974) | 7–8 |
| Michigan | Big 10 | 41–18 (10–4) | Bud Middaugh | 4 (last: 1980) | 1st (1953) | 10–5 |
| Mississippi State | SEC | 45–15 (17–6) | Ron Polk | 2 (last: 1979) | 6th (1979) | 1–4 |
| Oklahoma State | Big 8 | 49–15 (12–6) | Gary Ward | 8 (last: 1968) | 1st (1959) | 19–15 |
| South Carolina | n/a | 44–13 (n/a) | June Raines | 2 (last: 1977) | 2nd (1975, 1977) | 7–4 |
| Texas | SWC | 58–9–1 (16–5) | Cliff Gustafson | 18 (last: 1979) | 1st (1949, 1950, 1975) | 38–32 |

=== Results ===
==== Bracket ====
Upper round 1
Mississippi State | 4
Michigan | 1
Arizona State | 11
Texas | 2
Oklahoma State | 8^{10}
South Carolina | 5
Miami (FL) | 6
Maine | 1

Upper round 2
Mississippi State | 3
Arizona State | 4
Oklahoma State | 12
Miami (FL) | 6
Lower round 1
Michigan | 5
Texas | 6
South Carolina | 12
Maine | 7

Upper final
Arizona State | 10
Oklahoma State | 11^{13}
Lower round 2
Miami (FL) | 4
Texas | 5
Mississippi State | 5
South Carolina | 6

Semifinals
Oklahoma State | 8
Texas | 15^{13}
Arizona State | 10
South Carolina | 7

Preliminary final
Texas | 3
Arizona State | 12

Final
Oklahoma State | 4
Arizona State | 7

==== Game results ====
| Date | Game | Winner | Score | Loser | Notes |
|---|---|---|---|---|---|
| May 30 | Game 1 | Mississippi State | 4–0 | Michigan | |
| May 30 | Game 2 | Arizona State | 11–2 | Texas | |
| May 31 | Game 3 | Oklahoma State | 8–5 (10 innings) | South Carolina | |
| May 31 | Game 4 | Miami (FL) | 6–1 | Maine | |
| June 1 | Game 5 | Arizona State | 4–3 | Mississippi State | |
| June 2 | Game 6 | Oklahoma State | 12–6 | Miami (FL) | |
| June 2 | Game 7 | Texas | 6–5 | Michigan | Michigan eliminated |
| June 3 | Game 8 | South Carolina | 12–7 | Maine | Maine eliminated |
| June 4 | Game 9 | Oklahoma State | 11–10 (13 innings) | Arizona State | Oklahoma St. qualified for final |
| June 4 | Game 10 | Texas | 5–4 | Miami (FL) | Miami (FL) eliminated |
| June 5 | Game 11 | South Carolina | 6–5 | Mississippi State | Mississippi State eliminated |
| June 6 | Game 12 | Texas | 15–8 (13 innings) | Oklahoma State | |
| June 6 | Game 13 | Arizona State | 10–7 | South Carolina | South Carolina eliminated |
| June 7 | Game 14 | Arizona State | 12–3 | Texas | Texas eliminated |
| June 8 | Final | Arizona State | 7–4 | Oklahoma State | Arizona State wins CWS |

=== All-Tournament Team ===
The following players were members of the All-Tournament Team.

| Position | Player | School |
|---|---|---|
| P | Kevin Dukes | Arizona State |
| P | Don Mundie | Mississippi State |
| C | Burk Goldthorn | Texas |
| 1B | Alvin Davis | Arizona State |
| 2B | Billy DeMann | Arizona State |
| 3B | Mike Sodders | Arizona State |
| SS | Rod Carraway | South Carolina |
| OF | Mark Gillaspie | Mississippi State |
| OF | Stan Holmes (MOP) | Arizona State |
| OF | Mickey Tettleton | Oklahoma State |
| DH | Lemmie Miller | Arizona State |

=== Notable players ===
- Arizona State: Alvin Davis, Donnie Hill, Lemmie Miller, Billy DeMann, Kevin Romine
- Maine: Kevin Buckley, Joe Johnson, Bill Swift
- Miami (FL): Neal Heaton, Mike Pagliarulo
- Michigan: Steve Ontiveros, Jim Paciorek, Chris Sabo
- Mississippi State:
- Oklahoma State: Gary Green, Mickey Tettleton, Jim Traber, Robbie Wine
- South Carolina: Don Gordon
- Texas: Mike Brumley, Spike Owen, Calvin Schiraldi, Mike Hamer

== See also ==
- 1981 NCAA Division II baseball tournament
- 1981 NCAA Division III baseball tournament
- 1981 NAIA World Series
