= Stan Holmes =

- Outfielder
- Born: February 1, 1960; Dos Palos, California, U.S.
- Died: February 28, 2011 (aged 51); Dos Palos, California, U.S.
- Batted: Right Threw: Right
- Stats at Baseball Reference

Stanley Craig Holmes (February 1, 1960 – February 28, 2011) was an American college and minor league baseball outfielder who is most notable for winning the College World Series MVP award in 1981.

Holmes was born in Dos Palos, California, where in high school one of his baseball teammates was future major leaguer Dave Henderson. Holmes played college baseball at Arizona State University and won the Most Outstanding Player award at the 1981 College World Series as a senior. He is one of five players from Arizona State University to win that award. The others are Sal Bando, John Dolinsek, Bob Horner and Ron Davini.

== Minor league career ==
Holmes was drafted by big league teams twice. In 1980, he was selected in the 19th round by the Seattle Mariners and chose not to sign with them. He played for the Alaska Goldpanners in 1980. He was drafted by the Minnesota Twins in the eighth round of the 1981 draft and signed with them. He played professionally until 1989, never reaching the majors. Although he began his professional career as an outfielder, he also spent a considerable amount of time playing first base and third base.

In his first professional season, 1981, he played for the Wisconsin Rapids Twins. In 182 at-bats he hit .291 with seven home runs and 38 RBI. He played for the Orlando Twins in 1982, hitting .250 with three home runs and 12 RBI in 80 at-bats. Playing for the Visalia Oaks in 1983, Holmes had perhaps the best year of his professional career when he hit .302 with 37 home runs and 115 RBI in 500 at-bats. He won the California League MVP Award that season. Still with Orlando in 1984, he hit .280 with 25 home runs and 101 RBI in 507 at-bats. In 1985, playing for both the Orlando Twins and Toledo Mud Hens, he hit a combined .235 with 11 home runs and 46 RBI in 340 at-bats. In 1986, he again played for Orlando and Toledo, hitting a combined .244 with 15 home runs and 60 RBI in 315 at-bats.

From 1987 to 1989, he played in the California Angels organization. In 1987, he played for the Midland Angels, hitting .309 with 30 home runs and 106 RBI in 517 at-bats. While playing for the Edmonton Trappers in 1988, he slumped and hit only .254 with 14 home runs and 62 RBI in 331 at-bats. He again played for the Trappers in 1989, hitting .158 in 38 at-bats. He finished up his career with the Huntsville Stars, hitting .167 in 48 at-bats.

Overall, Holmes hit .273 with 143 home runs and 545 RBI in 2858 at-bats. He also pitched in ten games, posting a 5.06 ERA.

== Death ==
Holmes died in February 2011, of complications from liver and kidney failure.
