= List of Houston Cougars baseball seasons =

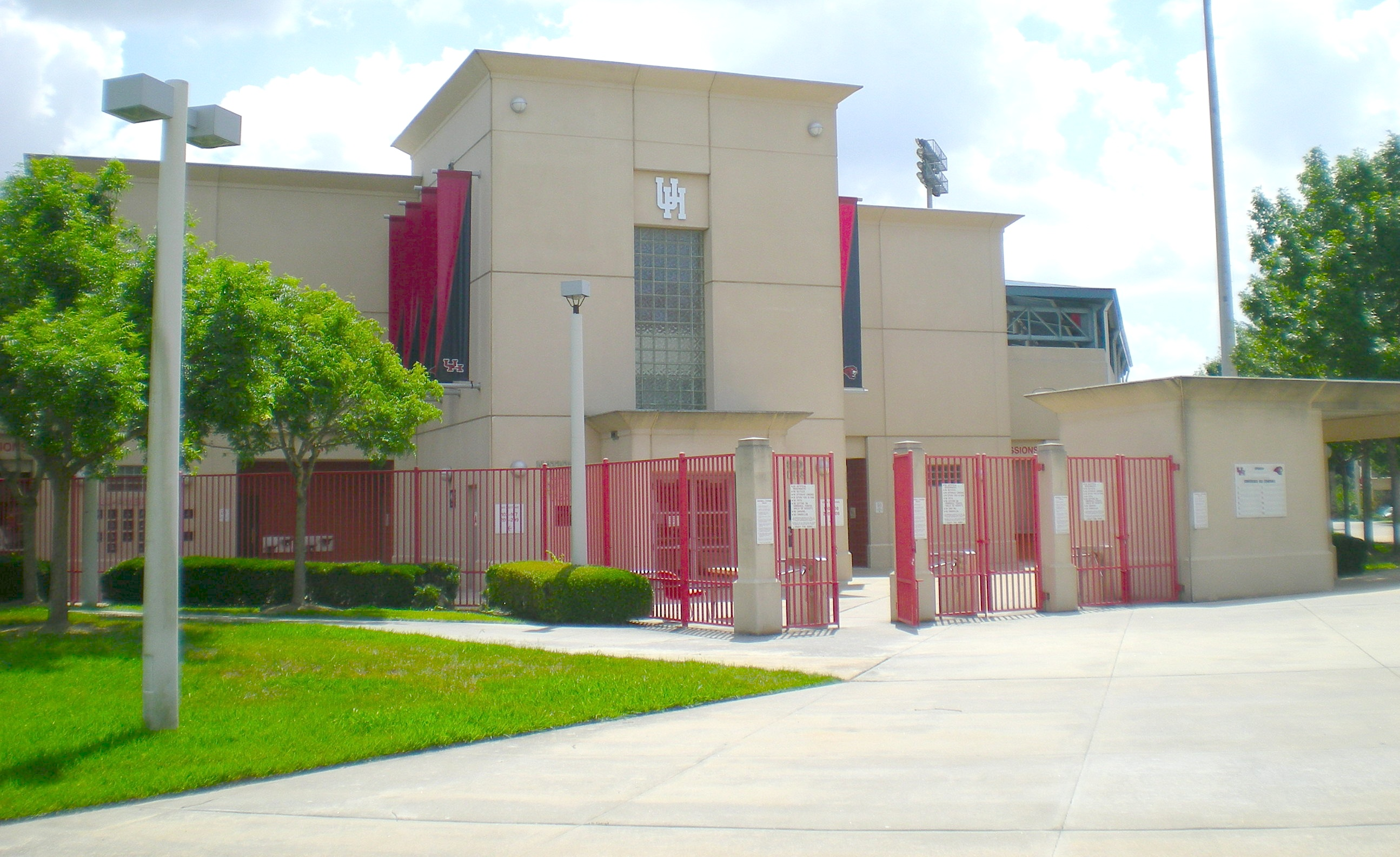
Schroeder Park, home of Houston Cougars baseball

This is a list of Houston Cougars baseball seasons. The Houston Cougars baseball program is a college baseball team that represents the University of Houston in the Big 12 Conference in the National Collegiate Athletic Association. Houston has played their home games at Schroeder Park (previously known as Cougar Field) in Houston since 1995.

The Cougars have won 11 conference regular season championships, 8 conference tournaments, and have played in the NCAA Division I Baseball Championship 22 times, advancing to the College World Series on 2 occasions.

== Season results ==
National champions	College World Series berth	NCAA tournament berth	Conference Tournament champions	Conference Regular Season champions

Season	Head coach	Conference	Season results									Tournament results		Final poll (Note: Collegiate Baseball began team rankings in 1959 and ceased after 2023. They were replaced by the D1Baseball (D1B) poll.)		
Season	Head coach	Conference	Overall				Conference/Division					Conference	Postseason (Note: Postseason play involving the NCAA Division I Baseball Championship began in 1947.)	BA	CB/D1B	Coaches
Season	Head coach	Conference	Wins	Losses	Ties	%	Wins	Losses	Ties	%	Finish	Conference	Postseason	BA	CB/D1B	Coaches
Houston Cougars
1947	Ned Thompson	Independent	1	5	0	.167	—	—	—	—	—	—	–	—	—	—
1948	Dalton Albert	Lone Star Conference	4	7	1	.375	2	6	0	.250	?	—	–	—	—	—
1949	Bill Lutz	Independent	7	9	0	.438	—	—	—	—	—	—	–	—	—	—
1950	Lovette Hill	Gulf Coast Conference	10	6	0	.625	4	0	0	1.00	1st	—	–	—	—	—
1951	Lovette Hill	Missouri Valley Conference	16	9	0	.666	7	1	0	.875	1st (West)	1st	District 5 Playoffs	—	—	—
1952	Lovette Hill	Missouri Valley Conference	11	6	0	.647	6	1	0	.857	1st (South)	2nd	–	—	—	—
1953	Lovette Hill	Missouri Valley Conference	15	11	0	.577	6	2	0	.750	1st	1st	College World Series	—	—	—
1954	Lovette Hill	Missouri Valley Conference	12	10	0	.545	4	5	0	.444	3rd	—	–	—	—	—
1955	Lovette Hill	Missouri Valley Conference	6	13	0	.316	3	5	0	.375	5th	—	–	—	—	—
1956	Lovette Hill	Missouri Valley Conference	14	10	0	.583	5	4	0	.555	4th	—	–	—	—	—
1957	Lovette Hill	Missouri Valley Conference	6	11	1	.361	4	3	0	.571	3rd	—	–	—	—	—
1958	Lovette Hill	Missouri Valley Conference	11	13	0	.458	6	3	0	.666	1st (West)	2nd	District 6 Playoffs	—	—	—
1959	Lovette Hill	Missouri Valley Conference	7	14	0	.333	5	4	0	.556	1st (West)	2nd	–	—	–	—
1960	Lovette Hill	Missouri Valley Conference	12	11	0	.522	6	1	0	.857	1st (West)	1st	District 6 Playoffs	—	–	—
1961	Lovette Hill	Independent	4	11	0	.267	—	—	—	—	—	—	–	—	–	—
1962	Lovette Hill	Independent	16	6	0	.727	—	—	—	—	—	—	–	—	–	—
1963	Lovette Hill	Independent	4	15	0	.211	—	—	—	—	—	—	–	—	–	—
1964	Lovette Hill	Independent	16	13	0	.552	—	—	—	—	—	—	–	—	–	—
1965	Lovette Hill	Independent	12	14	0	.462	—	—	—	—	—	—	–	—	–	—
1966	Lovette Hill	Independent	18	11	1	.617	—	—	—	—	—	—	District 6 Playoffs	—	–	—
1967	Lovette Hill	Independent	21	11	0	.656	—	—	—	—	—	—	College World Series Runner-up	—	2	—
1968	Lovette Hill	Independent	14	15	1	.483	—	—	—	—	—	—	–	—	–	—
1969	Lovette Hill	Independent	15	23	0	.395	—	—	—	—	—	—	–	—	–	—
1970	Lovette Hill	Independent	19	17	0	.528	—	—	—	—	—	—	–	—	–	—
1971	Lovette Hill	Independent	24	15	0	.615	—	—	—	—	—	—	–	—	–	—
1972	Lovette Hill	Independent	25	23	1	.520	—	—	—	—	—	—	–	—	–	—
1973	Lovette Hill	Southwest Conference	15	16	1	.484	9	11	0	.450	5th	—	–	—	–	—
1974	Lovette Hill	Southwest Conference	20	21	0	.488	10	13	0	.435	6th	—	–	—	–	—
1975	Rolan Walton	Southwest Conference	18	25	0	.419	8	16	0	.333	8th	—	–	—	–	—
1976	Rolan Walton	Southwest Conference	31	15	0	.674	16	8	0	.667	3rd	—	–	—	–	—
1977	Rolan Walton	Southwest Conference	27	17	1	.611	11	12	1	.479	6th	DNQ	–	—	–	—
1978	Rolan Walton	Southwest Conference	30	21	0	.588	14	10	0	.583	4th	2nd	–	—	13	—
1979	Rolan Walton	Southwest Conference	27	17	0	.614	11	13	0	.458	5th	DNQ	–	—	–	—
1980	Rolan Walton	Southwest Conference	17	28	1	.380	6	17	1	.271	9th	DNQ	–	—	–	—
1981	Rolan Walton	Southwest Conference	32	20	1	.613	11	9	1	.548	3rd	3rd	–	–	–	—
1982	Rolan Walton	Southwest Conference	42	14	2	.741	13	6	0	.684	2nd	2nd	West II Regional	19	21	—
1983	Rolan Walton	Southwest Conference	43	15	0	.741	13	8	0	.619	3rd	3rd	–	–	–	—
1984	Rolan Walton	Southwest Conference	32	23	0	.582	6	15	0	.286	7th	DNQ	–	–	–	—
1985	Rolan Walton	Southwest Conference	44	17	0	.721	12	9	0	.571	4th	3rd	Central Regional	22	22	—
1986	Rolan Walton	Southwest Conference	35	23	0	.603	8	13	0	.381	5th	DNQ	–	–	–	—
1987	Bragg Stockton	Southwest Conference	40	24	1	.623	11	10	0	.524	4th	3rd	Central Regional	–	14	—
1988	Bragg Stockton	Southwest Conference	33	22	3	.595	6	14	0	.300	7th	DNQ	–	–	–	—
1989	Bragg Stockton	Southwest Conference	43	17	0	.717	9	12	0	.429	T–4th	4th	–	–	–	—
1990	Bragg Stockton	Southwest Conference	44	23	0	.657	12	9	0	.571	3rd	2nd	South I Regional	21	24	—
1991	Bragg Stockton	Southwest Conference	37	19	0	.661	10	11	0	.476	T–4th	DNQ	–	–	–	—
1992	Bragg Stockton	Southwest Conference	25	28	0	.472	13	21	0	.382	7th	DNQ	–	–	–	—
1993	Bragg Stockton	Southwest Conference	31	24	0	.564	3	15	0	.167	7th	DNQ	–	–	–	—
1994	Bragg Stockton	Southwest Conference	30	26	0	.536	4	14	0	.222	7th	DNQ	–	–	–	—
1995	Rayner Noble	Southwest Conference	26	29	0	.473	6	18	0	.250	7th	DNQ	–	–	–	—
1996	Rayner Noble	Southwest Conference	29	28	0	.509	9	15	0	.375	T–6th	7th	–	–	–	–
1997	Rayner Noble	Conference USA	40	23	0	.635	19	8	0	.704	2nd	1st	South I Regional	–	–	–
1998	Rayner Noble	Conference USA	34	25	0	.576	21	6	0	.778	2nd	Second Round	–	–	–	–
1999	Rayner Noble	Conference USA	40	24	0	.625	20	7	0	.741	1st	2nd	Houston Regional	24	24	–
2000	Rayner Noble	Conference USA	48	18	0	.727	21	4	0	.840	1st	1st	Houston Super Regional	11	13	12
2001	Rayner Noble	Conference USA	29	30	0	.492	20	7	0	.741	2nd	First Round	Houston Regional	–	–	–
2002	Rayner Noble	Conference USA	48	17	0	.738	22	7	0	.758	1st	2nd	Austin Super Regional	10	10	10
2003	Rayner Noble	Conference USA	37	30	0	.552	18	12	0	.600	4th	Second Round	Houston Super Regional	22	16	24
2004	Rayner Noble	Conference USA	30	29	0	.508	19	11	0	.633	T–4th	Semifinals	–	–	–	–
2005	Rayner Noble	Conference USA	29	30	0	.492	16	13	0	.552	5th	Semifinals	–	–	–	–
2006	Rayner Noble	Conference USA	39	22	0	.639	18	6	0	.750	2nd	2nd	Norman Regional	24	21	24
2007	Rayner Noble	Conference USA	28	28	0	.500	12	12	0	.500	T–4th	First Round	–	–	–	–
2008	Rayner Noble	Conference USA	42	24	0	.636	14	10	0	.583	4th	1st	College Station Regional	–	–	–
2009	Rayner Noble	Conference USA	27	31	0	.466	13	11	0	.542	T–3rd	Semifinals	–	–	–	–
2010	Rayner Noble	Conference USA	25	32	0	.446	11	13	0	.458	T–5th	6th	–	–	–	–
2011	Todd Whitting	Conference USA	27	32	0	.458	12	12	0	.500	T–4th	2nd	–	–	–	–
2012	Todd Whitting	Conference USA	18	35	1	.343	5	18	1	.229	8th	4th (Division A)	–	–	–	–
2013	Todd Whitting	Conference USA	36	22	0	.621	13	11	0	.542	T–5th	3rd (Division B)	–	–	–	–
2014	Todd Whitting	American Athletic Conference	48	18	0	.727	14	9	0	.609	T–3rd	1st	Austin Super Regional	11	11	11
2015	Todd Whitting	American Athletic Conference	43	20	0	.683	16	8	0	.667	1st	2nd	Houston Regional	18	–	23
2016	Todd Whitting	American Athletic Conference	36	23	0	.610	11	12	0	.478	5th	2nd	–	–	–	–
2017	Todd Whitting	American Athletic Conference	42	21	0	.667	15	9	0	.625	T–1st	1st	Houston Regional	22	–	24
2018	Todd Whitting	American Athletic Conference	38	25	0	.603	16	8	0	.667	1st	Semifinals	Chapel Hill Regional	25	–	–
2019	Todd Whitting	American Athletic Conference	32	24	0	.571	12	12	0	.500	T–4th	First Round	–	–	–	–
2020	Todd Whitting	American Athletic Conference	6	9	0	.400	0	0	0	–	–	Canceled	–	–	–	–
2021	Todd Whitting	American Athletic Conference	19	34	0	.358	7	21	0	.250	7th	First Round	–	–	–	–
2022	Todd Whitting	American Athletic Conference	37	24	0	.607	13	11	0	.542	3rd	2nd	–	–	–	–
2023	Todd Whitting	American Athletic Conference	36	23	0	.610	17	6	0	.739	2nd	Semifinals	–	–	–	–
2024	Todd Whitting	Big 12 Conference	26	28	0	.481	7	21	0	.250	12th	DNQ	–	–	–	–
2025	Todd Whitting	Big 12 Conference	30	25	0	.545	12	17	0	.414	11th	Quarterfinals	–	–	–	–
2026	Todd Whitting	Big 12 Conference	24	31	0	.436	7	23	0	.233	14th	DNQ	–	–	–	–
Total
Total			2,065	1,578	16	.567										
