= Houston Cougars baseball statistical leaders =

The Houston Cougars baseball statistical leaders are individual statistical leaders of the Houston Cougars baseball program in various categories, including batting average, home runs, runs batted in, runs, hits, stolen bases, ERA, and Strikeouts. Within those areas, the lists identify single-game, single-season, and career leaders. The Cougars represent the University of Houston in the NCAA's Big 12 Conference.

Houston began competing in intercollegiate baseball in 1947. These lists are updated through the end of the 2025 season.

== Batting Average ==
Career (min. 2 years played, 2 AB for each team game)
Rk	Player	AVG	Seasons
1	Corky Swindell	.3753	1982 1983
2	Tom Paciorek	.3746	1966 1967 1968
3	Keith Darter	.372	1989 1990
4	Jarrod Bitter	.368	1998 1999 2000
5	Ike Lucas	.359	1965 1966 1967
6	Shane Buteaux	.357	1993 1994
7	Ricky Freeman	.354	1991 1992 1993 1994
8	Justin Murray	.353	2023 2024
9	Mark Grimes	.352	1984 1985
10	Fred Hinojosa	.349	1987 1988 1989 1990

Season (min. 2 AB for each team game)
Rk	Player	AVG	Season
1	Tom Paciorek	.435	1967
2	Goefrey Tomlinson	.427	1997
3	Corky Swindell	.422	1983
4	Fred Hinojosa	.412	1988
5	Mike Minturn	.408	1981
6	Steve Kovar	.404	1977
7	Jerry Willeford	.403	1976
8	Dustin Carr	.399	1997
9	Ike Lucas	.398	1965
10	J.J. Matzke	.397	1993

== Home Runs ==
Career
Rk	Player	HR	Seasons
1	Joe Davis	53	2016 2017 2018 2019
2	Pat Hewes	31	1985 1986
3	Ryan Hernandez	30	2020 2021 2022
	J.P. Woodward	30	1999 2000
5	Chris Snyder	29	2000 2001 2002
6	Jarrod Bitter	27	1998 1999 2000
7	Brett Cooley	25	2002 2003 2004
	Bruce Rios	25	1996 1997 1998 1999
9	Zach Arnold	23	2022 2023
	Connor Wong	23	2015 2016 2017
	Jake Stewart	23	2004 2005 2006 2007 2008

Season
Rk	Player	HR	Season
1	Pat Hewes	23	1986
2	Jake Scheiner	18	2017
	Brett Cooley	18	2002
	J.P. Woodward	18	1999
	Joe Davis	18	2019
6	Cary Arbolida	17	2024
7	Matt Weston	16	2006
	Omar Brewer	16	1987
	Goefrey Tomlinson	16	1997
	Mark Grimes	16	1985

Single Game
Rk	Player	HR	Season	Opponent
1	Ryan Hernandez	3	2021	UTA
	Connor Wong	3	2017	Tulane
	Jake Scheiner	3	2017	Alabama State
	Austin Gracey	3	2010	UTSA
	Jake Stewart	3	2008	UAB
	J.P. Woodward	3	1999	Louisville
	Mark Grimes	3	1985	Trinity

== Runs Batted In ==
Career
Rk	Player	RBI	Seasons
1	Joe Davis	223	2016 2017 2018 2019
2	Bruce Rios	160	1996 1997 1998 1999
3	Jarrod Bitter	150	1998 1999 2000
4	Caleb Ramsey	144	2008 2009 2010 2011
5	Brandon Caraway	143	1997 1998 1999 2000
6	Dustin Kingsbury	137	2004 2005 2006 2007
	Fred Hinojosa	137	1987 1988 1989 1990
8	Eric Lee	132	1997 1998 1999 2000
9	Hyung Cho	130	2001 2002 2003
10	Chris Snyder	129	2000 2001 2002

Season
Rk	Player	RBI	Season
1	Chris Snyder	71	2002
2	Bryan Pounds	67	2008
	Goefrey Tomlinson	67	1997
	Lonnie Walker	67	1987
5	Hyung Cho	66	2003
	J.P. Woodward	66	1999
7	Jake Scheiner	64	2017
8	Joe Davis	62	2018
	Pat Hewes	62	1986
10	Tyson Schweitzer	61	2000

Single Game
Rk	Player	RBI	Season	Opponent
1	Bobby Hollas	9	1979	Northwestern State

== Runs ==
Career
Rk	Player	R	Seasons
1	Brandon Caraway	238	1997 1998 1999 2000
2	Eric Lee	179	1997 1998 1999 2000
3	Michael Bourn	167	2001 2002 2003
4	Jake Stewart	164	2004 2005 2006 2007 2008
5	Dustin Carr	161	1994 1995 1996 1997
6	Phil Lewis	154	1990 1991 1992 1993
7	Connor Wong	152	2015 2016 2017
8	Zak Presley	149	2007 2008 2009 2010
9	Josh Vidales	148	2013 2014 2015 2016
	Blake Kelso	148	2008 2009 2010

Season
Rk	Player	R	Season
1	Dustin Carr	80	1997
2	Jake Stewart	74	2008
	Brandon Caraway	74	1998
	Goefrey Tomlinson	74	1997
5	Brandon Caraway	72	1999
6	Michael Bourn	68	2002
	John Altobelli	68	1985
8	Dominic Hernandez	62	1996
9	Connor Wong	61	2017
	Scott Keithley	61	1997

Single Game
Rk	Player	R	Season	Opponent
1	8 players	5	Most recent: Kenneth Jimenez, 2025 vs. UT Arlington	

== Hits ==
Career
Rk	Player	H	Seasons
1	Brandon Caraway	324	1997 1998 1999 2000
2	Joe Davis	288	2016 2017 2018 2019
3	Eric Lee	253	1997 1998 1999 2000
4	Zak Presley	244	2007 2008 2009 2010
	Blake Kelso	244	2008 2009 2010
6	Caleb Ramsey	241	2008 2009 2010 2011
7	Phil Lewis	234	1990 1991 1992 1993
	Justin Montemayor	234	2013 2014 2015 2016
9	Jake Stewart	232	2004 2005 2006 2007 2008
10	Josh Vidales	230	2013 2014 2015 2016

Season
Rk	Player	H	Season
1	Dustin Carr	108	1997
2	Goefrey Tomlinson	106	1997
3	Brandon Caraway	97	1999
4	Hyung Cho	94	2003
5	Keith Darter	93	1990
6	Bryan Pounds	91	2008
7	Ryan Lormand	89	2008
8	Jarrod Bitter	88	1999
9	Jared Triolo	85	2018
	Blake Kelso	85	2009
	Jake Stewart	85	2008

Single Game
Rk	Player	H	Season	Opponent
1	Frankie Ratcliff	6	2014	A&M-Corpus Christi

== Stolen Bases ==
Career
Rk	Player	SB	Seasons
1	Brandon Caraway	94	1997 1998 1999 2000
2	Michael Bourn	90	2001 2002 2003
3	Kyle Survance	82	2013 2014 2015
4	David Vinson	71	1971 1972 1973 1974
5	Eric Lee	65	1997 1998 1999 2000
	Zak Presley	65	2007 2008 2009 2010
7	Jake Stewart	57	2004 2005 2006 2007 2008
8	Phil Lewis	56	1990 1991 1992 1993
	Tre Broussard	56	2025 2026
10	Dustin Carr	54	1994 1995 1996 1997

Season
Rk	Player	SB	Season
1	Trey Williams	36	1969
2	Michael Bourn	35	2001
3	Shaun Skrehot	33	1997
4	Michael Bourn	32	2002
	Thad Altman	32	1976
6	Kyle Survance	31	2015
	Kyle Survance	31	2014
	Tre Broussard	31	2025
9	Ryan Lormand	29	2008
10	Brandon Caraway	27	1999
	Shane Buteaux	27	1994

Single Game
Rk	Player	SB	Season	Opponent
1	David Vinson	6	1971	Northwestern State

== Earned Run Average ==
Career (min. 2 years played, 1 IP for each team game)
Rk	Player	ERA	Seasons
1	Bob Peters	1.86	1959 1960 1961 1962
2	Rick Brewer	2.00	1966 1967
3	Aaron Fletcher	2.06	2015 2016 2017 2018
4	Jimmy McGee	2.13	1962 1963 1964
5	Dickie Thompson	2.23	1956 1957 1958
6	Tom Wenmoth	2.27	1964 1965
7	Trey Cumbie	2.45	2016 2017 2018
8	Jody Supak	2.46	1986 1987
9	Wayne Hill	2.55	1966 1967 1968

Season (min. 1 IP for each team game)
Rk	Player	ERA	Season
1	Tom Wenmoth	1.15	1964
2	Chase Wellbrock	1.1713	2014
3	Tyler Ford	1.1739	2014
4	Rayner Noble	1.31	1983
5	Bob Peters	1.39	1960
6	Dickie Thompson	1.54	1956
7	Larry Satcher	1.67	1966
8	Brad Lincoln	1.69	2006
9	Ronnie Zeller	1.70	1955
10	Rick Brewer	1.80	1967

== Strikeouts ==
Career
Rk	Player	K	Seasons
1	Brad Sullivan	409	2001 2002 2003
2	Shane Nance	388	1997 1998 1999 2000
3	Brad Lincoln	293	2004 2005 2006
4	Seth Romero	290	2015 2016 2017
5	Kyle Crowell	238	1998 1999 2000
6	Johnny Hatcher	235	1970 1971 1972 1973
7	Trey Cumbie	234	2016 2017 2018
8	Andrew Lantrip	232	2014 2015 2016
9	Wes Musick	219	2006 2007 2008 2009
10	Tom Lukish	214	1977 1978 1979 1980

Season
Rk	Player	K	Season
1	Brad Sullivan	157	2002
2	Brad Sullivan	154	2003
3	Brad Lincoln	152	2006
4	Ryan Wagner	148	2003
5	Shane Nance	119	1999
6	Kyle Crowell	117	2000
7	Andrew Lantrip	115	2015
8	Seth Romero	113	2016
9	Trey Cumbie	110	2018
	Antoine Jean	110	2025

Single Game
Rk	Player	K	Season	Opponent
1	Brad Sullivan	16	2002	Memphis
	Brad Sullivan	16	2003	Saint Louis
