= Todd Whitting =

American Baseball player and coach

Biographical details
- Born: June 13, 1972 (age 54); Dalhart, Texas, U.S.

Playing career
- 1991–1992: Houston
- 1993: Navarro College
- 1994–1995: Houston
- Position: Second baseman

Coaching career (HC unless noted)
- 1996–2003: Houston (assistant)
- 2004–2005: TCU (assistant)
- 2006–2010: TCU (associate HC)
- 2011–2026: Houston

Head coaching record
- Overall: 498–394–1 (.558)

Accomplishments and honors

Championships
- 2 AAC tournament (2014, 2017); 3 AAC regular season (2015, 2017, 2018)

Awards
- AAC Coach of the Year (2018)

Todd Ross Whitting (born June 13, 1972) is an American college baseball coach and former player. Whitting served as associate head coach for the TCU Horned Frogs under Jim Schlossnagle, where the team made their first College World Series appearance.

Whitting spent all but one of the first 12 years of his adult life at Houston as a player or coach. From 1991 to 1995 (except for 1993, which was spent at Navarro College), he played second base under Bragg Stockton and Rayner Noble. He graduated from Houston with a degree in kinesiology. He served as an assistant at Houston under Noble until 2003, when he left for TCU. From 2011 to 2026, Whitting served as the head coach at Houston.

== Head coaching record ==
Below is a table of Whitting's yearly records as an NCAA head baseball coach.

Record table
Season	Team	Overall	Conference	Standing	Postseason
Houston Cougars (Conference USA) (2011–2013)
2011	Houston	27–32	12–12	T–4th	
2012	Houston	18–35–1	5–18–1	8th	
2013	Houston	36–22	13–11	T–5th	
Houston Cougars (American Athletic Conference) (2014–2023)
2014	Houston	48–18	14–9	T–3rd	NCAA Super Regional
2015	Houston	43–20	16–8	1st	NCAA Regional
2016	Houston	36–23	11–12	5th	
2017	Houston	42–21	15–9	T–1st	NCAA Regional
2018	Houston	38–25	16–8	1st	NCAA Regional
2019	Houston	32–24	12–12	T–4th	
2020	Houston	6–9			Canceled due to COVID-19
2021	Houston	19–34	7–21	7th	
2022	Houston	37–24	13–11	3rd	
2023	Houston	36–23	17–6	2nd	
Houston Cougars (Big 12 Conference) (2024–2026)
2024	Houston	26–28	7–21	12th	
2025	Houston	30–25	12–17	11th	
2026	Houston	24–31	7–23	14th	
Houston:		498–394–1 (.558)	177–198–1 (.472)		
Total:		498–394–1 (.558)			
National champion Postseason invitational champion Conference regular season champion Conference regular season and conference tournament champion Division regular season champion Division regular season and conference tournament champion Conference tournament champion
