= 2000 Conference USA baseball tournament =

- Teams: 8
- Format: Eight-team double-elimination tournament
- Finals site: Florida Power Park; St. Petersburg, Florida
- Champions: Houston (2nd title)
- Winning coach: Rayner Noble (2nd title)
- MVP: Jarrod Bitter (Houston)

2000 Conference USA baseball standings
	Conf.						Overall
Team	W		L		T	PCT	W		L		T	PCT
No. 13 Houston ‍†‍‡‍^{y}	21	–	4	–	0	.840	48	–	18	–	0	.727
Tulane ‍‍‍^{y}	20	–	6	–	1	.759	38	–	22	–	1	.631
Southern Miss ‍‍‍	14	–	9	–	0	.609	32	–	26	–	0	.552
Charlotte ‍‍‍	15	–	11	–	0	.577	32	–	25	–	1	.560
South Florida ‍‍‍	14	–	13	–	0	.519	29	–	29	–	0	.500
Cincinnati ‍‍‍	11	–	16	–	0	.407	35	–	16	–	0	.686
UAB ‍‍‍	10	–	15	–	0	.400	28	–	32	–	0	.467
Louisville ‍‍‍	10	–	16	–	1	.389	17	–	37	–	1	.318
Memphis ‍‍‍	8	–	18	–	0	.308	15	–	37	–	0	.288
Saint Louis ‍‍‍	6	–	21	–	0	.222	19	–	34	–	0	.358
† – Conference champion ‡ – Tournament champion y – Invited to the NCAA tournament Rankings from Collegiate Baseball

The 2000 Conference USA baseball tournament was the 2000 postseason baseball championship of the NCAA Division I Conference USA, held at Florida Power Park in St. Petersburg, Florida, from May 17 through 21. Houston defeated Cincinnati in the championship game, earning the conference's automatic bid to the 2000 NCAA Division I baseball tournament.

The tournament's format was changed slightly from the format used from 1996 to 1999. The play-in round that had been used to determine which of the lowest seeds would participate in the eight-team bracket was eliminated. Instead, only the top eight of the conference's ten teams in the regular season qualified for the tournament. The loss of the play-in round shortened the tournament from six to five days.

== Regular season results ==
Team	W	L	PCT	GB	Seed
Houston	21	4	.840	-	1
Tulane	20	6	.769	1.5	2
Southern Miss	15	10	.600	6	3
Charlotte	15	11	.577	6.5	4
South Florida	14	13	.519	8	5
Cincinnati	11	16	.407	11	6
UAB	10	15	.400	11	7
Louisville	10	16	.385	11.5	8
Memphis	8	18	.308	13.5	--
Saint Louis	6	21	.222	16	--

- Records reflect conference play only.

== Bracket ==
First round
5	South Florida	1
**4**	**Charlotte**	**2**
8	Louisville	3
**1**	**Houston**	**4**
8	Louisville	6
**5**	**South Florida**	**10**
**7**	**UAB**	**11**
2	Tulane	4
**6**	**Cincinnati**	**7**
3	Southern Miss	2
**3**	**Southern Miss**	**10**
2	Tulane	9

Second round
**4**	**Charlotte**	**6**
1	Houston	1
5	South Florida	6
**1**	**Houston**	**19**
7	UAB	4
**6**	**Cincinnati**	**9**
**7**	**UAB**	**10**
3	Southern Miss	6

Semifinals
4	Charlotte	0	2
**1**	**Houston**	**3**	**14**
7	UAB	6
**6**	**Cincinnati**	**15**

Final
6	Cincinnati	4
**1**	**Houston**	**7**

- **Bold** indicates the winner of the game.
- Italics indicate that the team was eliminated from the tournament.

== All-tournament team ==
Position	Player	School
C	Jarrod Bitter	Houston
IF	Sean Allen	Houston
IF	Daniel Boyd	South Florida
IF	Eric Shanks	Charlotte
IF	Craig Tewes	Cincinnati
OF	Brandon Caraway	Houston
OF	Matt Singer	Cincinnati
OF	Will Smith	UAB
DH	Brad Schutz	Cincinnati
SP	Shane Nance	Houston
RP	Curtus Moak	Cincinnati
**MVP**	Jarrod Bitter	Houston
