= Joe Savery =

American baseball player (born 1985)

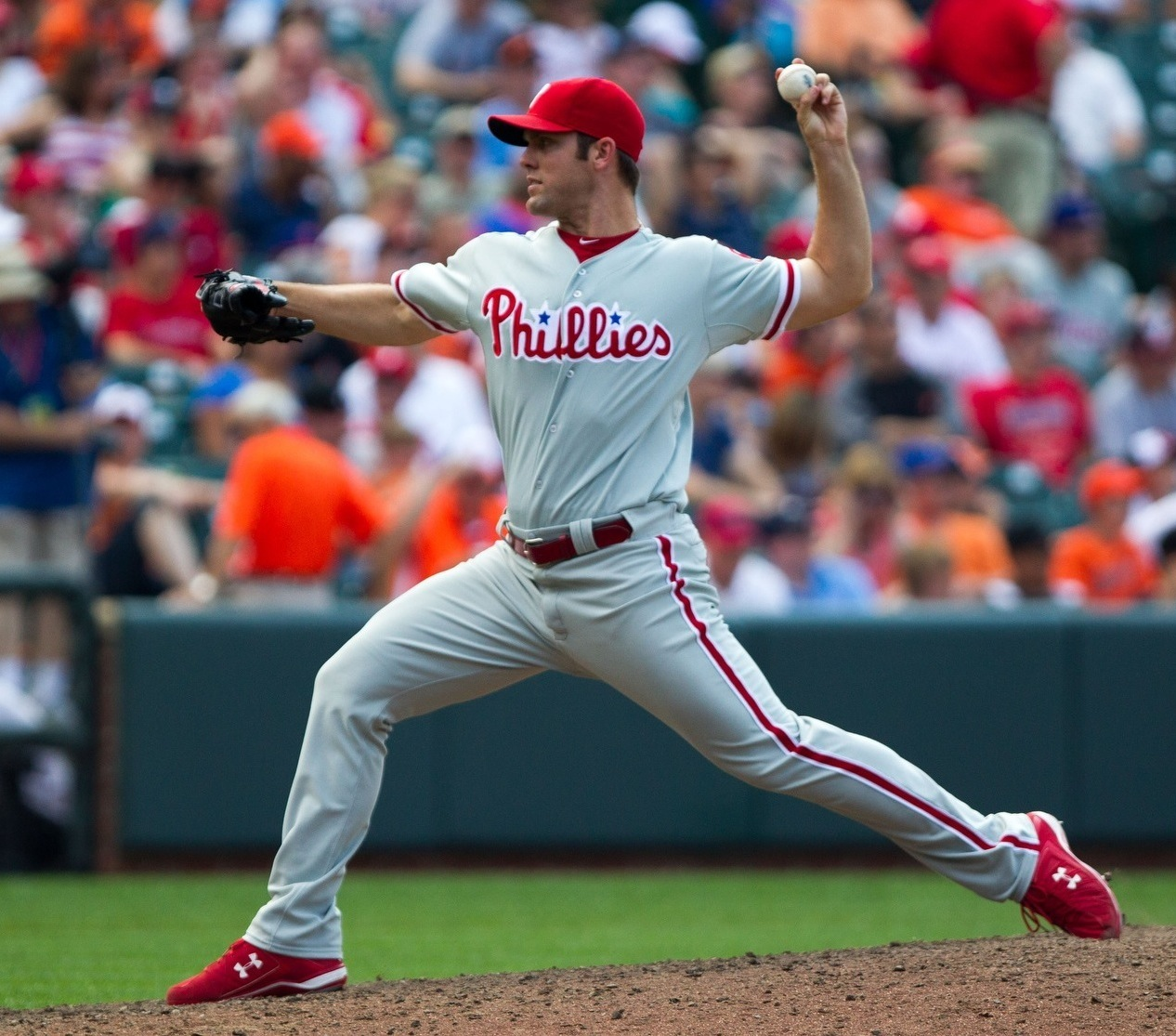
- Savery pitching for the Phillies, 2012
- Pitcher
- Born: November 4, 1985 (age 40); Houston, Texas, U.S.
- Batted: Left Threw: Left

MLB debut
- September 20, 2011, for the Philadelphia Phillies

Last MLB appearance
- May 18, 2014, for the Oakland Athletics

MLB statistics
- Win–loss record: 3–2
- Earned run average: 3.83
- Strikeouts: 32
- Stats at Baseball Reference

Teams
- Philadelphia Phillies (2011–2013); Oakland Athletics (2014)

Joseph Cain Savery (born November 4, 1985) is an American former professional baseball pitcher. He played in Major League Baseball (MLB) for the Philadelphia Phillies from 2011 through 2013 and Oakland Athletics in 2014. Before playing professionally, Savery attended Rice University, and played college baseball for the Rice Owls.

== Amateur career ==
A 2004 graduate of Lamar High School, Savery was a four-year starter and letterman for the Lamar Redskins. During his tenure at Lamar, he earned first team all-state and first team all-greater Houston. He was a three-time first team all-district 18-5a honoree, and was voted the most valuable player in the district in 2004. Joe was named the 2004 Proline player of the year after hitting .556 with 7 home runs and 40 RBI as a senior. He also went 11–0 on the mound with 93 strikeouts, posting a 0.53 ERA. Joe lead the Redskins to be nationally ranked in 3 different polls during his senior year.

Savery matriculated to Rice University in August 2004, where he played for the Rice Owls baseball team. Savery concentrated on baseball, starting at first base and in the outfield when not pitching.

As a freshman in 2005, Savery stepped into the starting lineup as opening-day pitcher and a regular in the batting lineup. Savery earned second- and third-team all-America honors while being named National Freshman of the Year and Western Athletic Conference Player of the Year. He was named first-team all-WAC at pitcher and first base after leading the conference with a .382 batting average and finishing second with a 2.49 ERA. In the postseason, Savery helped Rice to an upset NCAA regional win over LSU at formidable Alex Box Stadium in Baton Rouge. In the NCAA super regional against top-ranked Tulane, Savery broke his right hand in the opening game while making a sliding catch against the Turchin Stadium fence. The injury prevented Savery from hitting, but he pitched into the seventh inning and allowed only one run in Rice's Game 2 loss. Tulane advanced to the 2005 College World Series with a win in Game 3.

As a sophomore in 2006, Savery again earned third-team all-America status despite making only 11 pitching starts due to injury. At the plate, Savery hit .335 and was one of Rice's most dangerous postseason hitters, earning MVP honors in that year's conference tournament and making the all-regional team. He also hit a three-run home run in the decisive third game of the NCAA super regional against Oklahoma, helping the Owls to the 2006 College World Series. At the College World Series, Savery went 3-for-3 in Rice's opening-game win against Georgia but was just 1-for-9 after that.

As a junior in 2007, Savery spent much of the season trying to recover his form on the mound after offseason surgery. He continued to dominate at the plate, leading the Owls in hitting, but struggled with control and efficiency on the mound while posting a sub-3.00 ERA. Savery was named a first-team all-America as a two-way player and earned his second conference Player of the Year award in three seasons. He saved his best for the postseason, leading Rice through the NCAA regional with a Most Outstanding Player performance that included a dominant mound performance in the Sunday clincher against TCU.

Four days after the regional, during an emotional pre-super-regional press conference, Savery was selected in the first round of the 2007 Major League Baseball draft. Rice then swept Texas A&M in a tense super regional to advance to the 2007 College World Series. After hitting a homer in the first game against Louisville, Savery finally got to pitch in Omaha and earned the win in a 14–4 defeat of North Carolina.

== Professional career ==
=== Philadelphia Phillies ===
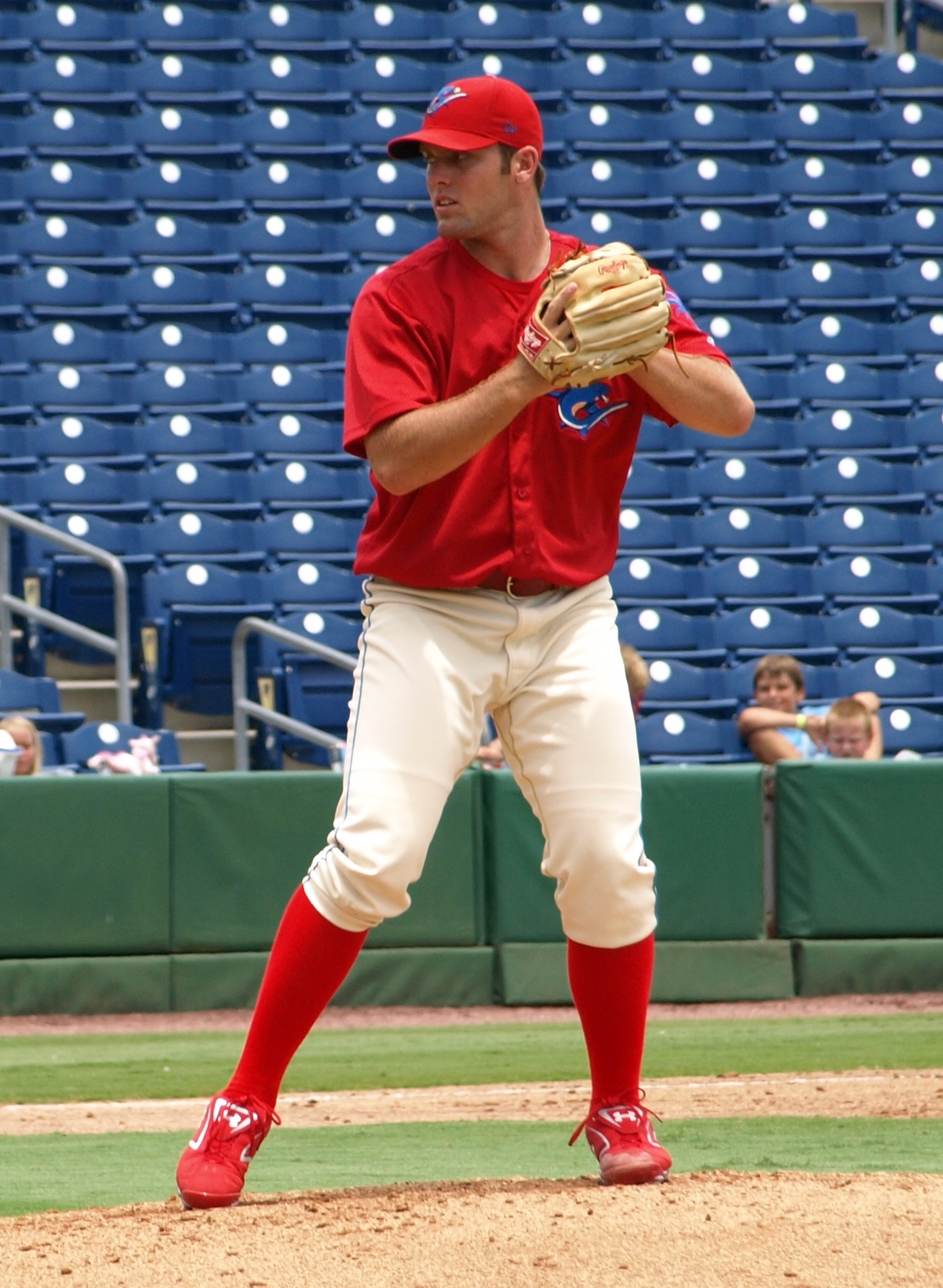
Savery, pitching for the High–A Clearwater Threshers

Savery was the Phillies' first-round draft pick out of Rice in 2007 as the 19th overall pick. After signing with the Philadelphia Phillies, Savery was assigned to the Low–A Williamsport Crosscutters of the New York-Penn League. In 7 starts, he compiled a 2–3 win-loss record with a 2.73 ERA, 22 strikeouts, and 13 walks. Savery played in the 2007 Arizona Fall League with the Peoria Saguaros.

In 2008, Savery skipped over the Single–A Lakewood BlueClaws and was assigned to the High–A Clearwater Threshers. There, he went 9–10 with a 4.13 ERA over 27 games (24 starts). He compiled 122 strikeouts in 150 1/3 innings while giving up 60 walks and 10 home runs.

In 2009, Savery split time between the Double–A Reading Fightin Phils and Triple–A Lehigh Valley IronPigs. In Reading, he had one of his best seasons to date, going 12–4 with a 4.41 ERA and 77 strikeouts in 112 1/3 innings pitched while walking 53, and giving up 13 home runs. Savery subsequently earned a mid-season promotion to Triple–A Lehigh Valley. There, he went 4–2 in 7 starts with an ERA of 4.38. In 39 innings he walked 24 while striking out only 19.

In 2010, Savery was assigned to Lehigh Valley where his stats and his control got worse. He went 1–12 with his worst ERA of his professional career at 4.66, striking out 67 batters and giving up 51 walks in 127 1/3 innings. During the off-season of 2010 it was announced that Savery would be converted into a batter, with the hope he can recapture his collegiate success. He participated in the FIL after the season to learn first base.

During the off-season Joe worked on his strength and conditioning. He switched some of his training techniques from being a pitcher, and began training more like a hitter. After hitting .348 for the Triple–A Lehigh Valley IronPigs the Phillies were quite optimistic about Joe's chances of becoming a force in their Major League Lineup. After a successful spring training in 2011, Savery was assigned to the Clearwater Threshers, and as of April 15, 2011, was hitting .621, with four doubles and one home run. He finished the season batting .307 with two home runs for Clearwater. He was later promoted to Double–A Reading and Triple–A Lehigh Valley where he converted back into a pitcher, but this time as a relief pitcher. Savery compiled a 1.80 ERA, two saves, 25/6 k/BB ratio, in 25 innings pitched for the IronPigs.

Savery was called up to the Philadelphia Phillies on September 16, 2011, after spending most of the 2011 season with the Phillies' Triple–A affiliate, the Lehigh Valley IronPigs. He made his debut on September 20, against the Washington Nationals. In his first four appearances, Savery faced nine batters, giving up one hit, recording two strikeouts and no walks.

Savery opened the 2012 season with the Phillies, appearing on an Opening Day roster for the first time in his career. He was optioned to the IronPigs on April 15 to accommodate José Contreras's return to the active roster, but returned to the Phillies less than a week later after Cliff Lee landed on the 15–day disabled list.

Savery started the 2013 campaign with Lehigh Valley. He was recalled on April 19 and made one appearance before being optioned. He was recalled again by the Phillies on May 6 when Roy Halladay went on the disabled list, but didn't make an appearance before being optioned. Savery was recalled on May 31 when the struggling Chad Durbin was released. On July 23, Savery was placed on the disabled list with elbow stiffness, and returned as a late–season call–up on September 3. In 18 games with the Phillies in 2013, Savery went 2–0 with one hold and a 3.15 ERA, striking out 14 in 20 innings.

Savery was designated for assignment by the Phillies on February 16, 2014.

=== Oakland Athletics ===
Savery was claimed off waivers by the Oakland Athletics on February 17, 2014. He made three scoreless appearances for Oakland, recording no strikeouts over four innings of relief. Savery was designated for assignment by the Athletics on September 1, following the promotion of Bryan Anderson.

=== Chicago White Sox ===
Savery signed a minor league contract with the Chicago White Sox on January 22, 2015. He was released prior to the start of the season on March 30.

On April 8, 2015, Savery announced his retirement from professional baseball.
