= 1981 Southwest Conference baseball tournament =

- Teams: 4
- Format: Double-elimination tournament
- Finals site: Disch–Falk Field; Austin, Texas
- Champions: Texas (3rd title)
- Winning coach: Cliff Gustafson (3rd title)

1981 Southwest Conference baseball standings
	Conf.						Overall
Team	W		L		T	PCT	W		L		T	PCT
No. 3 Texas ‍†‍‡‍^{y}	16	–	5	–	1	.750	61	–	11	–	0	.847
Arkansas ‍‍‍	12	–	9	–	0	.571	31	–	21	–	0	.596
Houston ‍‍‍	11	–	9	–	0	.550	32	–	20	–	0	.615
Rice ‍‍‍	11	–	10	–	0	.524	34	–	23	–	0	.596
Texas A&M ‍‍‍	10	–	10	–	0	.500	35	–	16	–	0	.686
TCU ‍‍‍	9	–	12	–	0	.429	27	–	19	–	0	.587
Texas Tech ‍‍‍	8	–	13	–	0	.381	26	–	21	–	0	.553
Baylor ‍‍‍	6	–	15	–	0	.286	21	–	24	–	0	.467
† – Conference champion ‡ – Tournament champion y – Invited to the NCAA tournament As of June 30, 1981; Rankings from Collegiate Baseball

The 1981 Southwest Conference baseball tournament was the league's annual postseason tournament used to determine the Southwest Conference's (SWC) automatic bid to the 1981 NCAA Division I baseball tournament. The tournament was held from May 15 through 17 at Disch–Falk Field on the campus of the University of Texas in Austin, Texas.

The number 1 seed Texas Longhorns went 3–0 to win the team's third SWC tournament under head coach Cliff Gustafson.

== Format and seeding ==
The tournament featured the top four finishers of the SWC's eight teams in a double-elimination tournament.

Place	Team	Conference				Overall			Seed
Place	Team	W	L	%	GB	W	L	%	Seed
1	Texas	16	5	.762	-	61	11	.847	1
2	Arkansas	12	9	.571	4	31	21	.596	2
3	Houston	11	9	.550	4.5	32	20	.615	3
4	Rice	11	10	.524	5	34	23	.596	4
5	Texas A&M	10	10	.500	5.5	35	16	.686	-
6	TCU	9	12	.429	7	27	19	.587	-
7	Texas Tech	8	13	.381	8	26	21	.553	-
8	Baylor	6	15	.286	10	21	24	.467	-

== Tournament ==
First round
1	Texas	7
4	Rice	6^{20}
2	Arkansas	2
3	Houston	7
Lower round 1
4	Rice	4
2	Arkansas	5

Semifinals
1	Texas	9
3	Houston	3
Lower final
3	Houston	3
2	Arkansas	9

Finals
1	Texas	11	–
2	Arkansas	1	–
