= 2008 Conference USA baseball tournament =

- Teams: 8
- Format: Eight-team double-elimination tournament
- Finals site: Turchin Stadium; New Orleans, Louisiana
- Champions: Houston (3rd title)
- Winning coach: Rayner Noble (3rd title)
- MVP: Bryan Pounds (Houston)

The 2008 Conference USA baseball tournament was the 2008 postseason college baseball championship of the NCAA Division I Conference USA, held at Turchin Stadium in New Orleans, Louisiana, from May 21–May 25, 2008. Houston won their third C-USA tournament, and received Conference USA's automatic bid to the 2008 NCAA Division I baseball tournament. The tournament consisted of eight teams, with two double-elimination brackets, and a single-game final.

== Regular season results ==
Team	W	L	T	Pct	GB	Seed
Rice	21	3		.875	--	1
Southern Miss	15	9		.625	6	2
Tulane	13	9		.591	7	3
Houston	14	10		.583	7	4
East Carolina	13	11		.542	8	5
Marshall	10	13		.435	10.5	6
UCF	8	16		.333	13	7
UAB	7	17		.292	14	8
Memphis	5	18		.217	15	--

- SMU, Tulsa, and UTEP did not field baseball teams. Memphis did not make the tournament.

== Bracket ==
First round May 21–23	Second round May 23–24
5	East Carolina	4
4	**Houston**	**5**
4	Houston	4
8	**UAB**	**5**
8	**UAB**	**8**
1	Rice	2
Bracket One
5	**East Carolina**	**4**
1	Rice	3	5	East Carolina	1
4	**Houston**	**2**
7	UCF	5
2	**Southern Miss**	**8**
2	**Southern Miss**	**5**
6	Marshall	3
6	**Marshall**	**10**
3	Tulane	5
Bracket Two
7	UCF	2
3	**Tulane**	**5**	6	**Marshall**	**8**
2	Tulane	7

Semi-finals; May 24–25
8	UAB	5	1
4	**Houston**	**10**	**3**
2	Southern Miss	3	3
6	**Marshall**	**6**	**5**

Finals; May 25
4	**Houston**	**3**
6	Marshall	2

- **Bold** indicates the winner of the game.
- Italics indicate that the team was eliminated from the tournament.

== Finish order ==
Finish	Team	W	L	T	Pct	Seed	Eliminated By
1	Houston^{†}	5	1	0	.833	4	
2	Marshall	4	2	0	.667	6	Houston
3	Southern Miss^{#}	2	2	0	.500	2	Marshall
4	UAB	2	2	0	.500	8	Houston
5	Tulane^{#}	1	2	0	.333	3	Marshall
6	East Carolina^{#}	1	2	0	.333	5	Houston
7	UCF	0	2	0	.000	7	Tulane
8	Rice^{#}	0	2	0	.000	1	East Carolina
^{†} - Winner of the tournament and received an automatic bid to the NCAA tournament.^{#} - Received an at-large bid to the NCAA tournament.

== All-tournament team ==
Position	Player	School
C	Allen Aubin	Alabama–Birmingham
IF	Adam Amar	Memphis
IF	Ryan Keedy	Alabama–Birmingham
IF	Bryan Pounds	Houston
IF	Adam Yeager	Marshall
OF	Drew Carson	Southern Mississippi
OF	Nate Lape	Marshall
OF	Zak Presley	Houston
DH	Kyle Roller	East Carolina
P	Steve Blevins	Marshall
P	Jared Ray	Houston
P	Kyle Roberson	Alabama–Birmingham
P	Dan Straily	Marshall
**MVP**	Bryan Pounds	Houston
