= Shane Nance =

American baseball player (born 1977)

- Relief pitcher
- Born: September 7, 1977 (age 48); Pasadena, Texas, U.S.
- Batted: Left Threw: Left

MLB debut
- August 24, 2002, for the Milwaukee Brewers

Last MLB appearance
- September 28, 2004, for the Arizona Diamondbacks

MLB statistics
- Win–loss record: 1–3
- Earned run average: 5.02
- Strikeouts: 39
- Stats at Baseball Reference

Teams
- Milwaukee Brewers (2002–2003); Arizona Diamondbacks (2004)

Shane Nance
Medal record

Men's baseball

Representing United States

Baseball World Cup
Silver medal – second place	2001 Taipei	National team

Joseph Shane Nance (born September 7, 1977) is an American former Major League Baseball pitcher. He played parts of three seasons in the majors, from 2002 to 2003 with the Milwaukee Brewers and in 2004 with the Arizona Diamondbacks.

== College career ==
Nance attended the University of Houston, where he played college baseball for the Cougars. While there, he was named to the All-Tournament Team at the 1999 Conference USA baseball tournament, in which Houston was the runner-up. He was named to the team again in the 2000 tournament, which Houston won.

== Professional career ==
Nance never pitched more than 24 innings in a major league season as his seasons were cut short by trips up and down to the minor leagues. Nance's career ERA was 5.02 with a win–loss record of 1–3. Nance retired after the 2005 season. He now has two children with his wife.
