= USA Stadium =

Coordinates: 35.33604°N 89.92017°W

The USA Stadium is a baseball stadium in Millington, Tennessee, in the United States. It is located at 4351 Babe Howard Boulevard in Millington. Between 1986 and 1996, it was the training ground for the USA Olympic Baseball team and once hosted the University of Memphis baseball team. The 1999 Conference USA baseball tournament was held at the stadium.

USA Stadium is the current home of the Southwest Tennessee Community College Salquis Baseball team, coached by Erik Schoenrock.

USA Stadium hosted the NJCAA Division II Baseball World Series from 1993-2008, Conference USA Tournament in 1999, Gulf South Conference Tournament from 2002-2009 and 2011 and Division III College World Series Regional from 2011 to 2013.

It also hosts a number of local community events.

Located on the grounds of USA Stadium is a full Rugby park. Two full sized pitches, permanent bathrooms, a storage shed, along with equipment make up the complex. It hosts 50 regular season games along with the West TN Youth Conference playoffs as well as the Tennessee Rugby Association State Semi-Finals and the Elvis 7s tournament.
