= 1997 Conference USA baseball tournament =

- Teams: 10
- Format: Play-in round followed by eight-team double-elimination tournament
- Finals site: Turchin Stadium; New Orleans, Louisiana
- Champions: Houston (1st title)
- Winning coach: Rayner Noble (1st title)
- MVP: Scottie Scott (Houston)

1997 Conference USA baseball standings
	Conf.				Overall
Team	W		L	PCT	W		L	PCT
Tulane ‍†‍‍	19	–	7	.731	40	–	21	.656
Houston ‍‍‡‍^{y}	19	–	8	.704	40	–	23	.635
South Florida ‍‍‍^{y}	18	–	8	.692	39	–	24	.619
Southern Miss ‍‍‍	16	–	10	.615	34	–	23	.596
Charlotte ‍‍‍	14	–	12	.538	30	–	26	.536
UAB ‍‍‍	14	–	13	.519	31	–	29	.517
Louisville ‍‍‍	11	–	15	.423	23	–	32	.418
Memphis ‍‍‍	9	–	17	.346	20	–	31	.392
Saint Louis ‍‍‍	8	–	19	.296	21	–	30	.412
Cincinnati ‍‍‍	4	–	23	.148	12	–	46	.207
† – Conference champion ‡ – Tournament champion y – Invited to the NCAA tournament As of June 30, 1997; Rankings from Collegiate Baseball

The 1997 Conference USA baseball tournament was the 1997 postseason baseball championship of the NCAA Division I Conference USA, held at Turchin Stadium in New Orleans, Louisiana, from May 13 through 18. Houston defeated Charlotte in the championship game, earning the conference's automatic bid to the 1997 NCAA Division I baseball tournament.

With the completion of Houston's move from the Southwest Conference, the conference expanded to 10 teams in baseball. As a result, the tournament's play-in round was expanded to include the 7th–10th seeds, instead of only the 8th and 9th.

== Regular season results ==
Team	W	L	PCT	GB	Seed
Tulane	19	7	.731	-	1
Houston	19	8	.704	0.5	2
South Florida	18	8	.692	1	3
Southern Miss	16	10	.615	3	4
Charlotte	14	12	.538	5	5
UAB	14	13	.519	5.5	6
Louisville	11	15	.423	8	7
Memphis	9	17	.346	10	8
Saint Louis	8	19	.296	11.5	9
Cincinnati	4	23	.148	15.5	10

- Records reflect conference play only.

== Bracket ==
=== Play-in games ===
Two play-in games among the four teams with the worst regular season records decided which two teams would have the final two spots in the eight-team double-elimination bracket.

Play-in game
**9**	**Saint Louis**	**9**
8	Memphis	2

Play-in game
**10**	**Cincinnati**	**8**
7	Louisville	5

=== Double-elimination ===
First round
**5**	**Charlotte**	**14**
4	Southern Miss	9
10	Cincinnati	0
**1**	**Tulane**	**10**
10	Cincinnati	0
**4**	**Southern Miss**	**5**
7	St. Louis	4
**2**	**Houston**	**13**
6	UAB	2
**3**	**South Florida**	**5**
7	Saint Louis	2
**6**	**UAB**	**6**

Second round
**5**	**Charlotte**	**8**
1	Tulane	6
4	Southern Miss	2
**1**	**Tulane**	**6**
3	South Florida	0
**2**	**Houston**	**2**
**6**	**UAB**	**5**
3	South Florida	3

Semifinals
**5**	**Charlotte**	4	**9**
1	Tulane	**13**	2
6	UAB	**6**	8
**2**	**Houston**	5	**10**

Final
5	Charlotte	7
**2**	**Houston**	**22**

- **Bold** indicates the winner of the game.
- Italics indicate that the team was eliminated from the tournament.

== All-tournament team ==
Position	Player	School
C	Scottie Scott	Houston
IF	Keith Graffagnini	Tulane
IF	Joey Hammond	Charlotte
IF	Jason Hill	Charlotte
IF	Shaun Skrehot	Houston
OF	Jason Fitzgerald	Tulane
OF	Nick Rhodes	Charlotte
OF	Goefrey Tomlinson	Houston
DH	Jason Schreiber	Houston
P	Gary Shuford	Charlotte
RP	Chris Mason	UAB
**MVP**	Scottie Scott	Houston
