= 2006 Conference USA baseball tournament =

- Teams: 8
- Format: Eight-team double-elimination tournament
- Finals site: Reckling Park; Houston, Texas
- Champions: Rice (1st title)
- Winning coach: Wayne Graham (1st title)
- MVP: Joe Savery (Rice)

The 2006 Conference USA baseball tournament was the 2006 postseason college baseball championship of the NCAA Division I Conference USA, held at Reckling Park in Houston, Texas, from May 24–May 28, 2006. Rice won the tournament in its first year as a member of the conference, and received Conference USA's automatic bid to the 2006 NCAA Division I baseball tournament. The tournament consisted of eight teams, with two double-elimination brackets, and a single-game final.

== Regular season results ==
Team	W	L	T	Pct	GB	Seed
Rice	22	2		.917	--	1
Houston	18	6		.750	4	2
Tulane	15	9		.625	7	3
Memphis	13	11		.542	9	4
Southern Miss	13	11		.542	9	5
East Carolina	10	14		.417	12	6
Marshall	6	18		.250	16	7
UAB	6	18		.250	16	8
UCF	5	19		.208	17	--

- Records listed are conference play only. SMU, Tulsa, and UTEP did not field baseball teams. UCF did not qualify for tournament play.

== Bracket ==
First round May 24–25
6	**East Carolina**	**4**
3	Tulane	2
7	Marshall	1
2	**Houston**	**9**
3	**Tulane**	**12**
7	Marshall	1
8	UAB	3
1	**Rice**	**9**
5	**Southern Miss**	**6**
4	Memphis	2
8	UAB	2
4	**Memphis**	**2**

Second round May 25–26
6	East Carolina	1
2	**Houston**	**9**
3	**Tulane**	**2**
6	East Carolina	1
1	**Rice**	**5**
5	Southern Miss	1
4	**Memphis**	**8**
5	Southern Miss	5

Semifinals; May 28
2	**Houston**	**6**
3	Tulane	0
1	**Rice**	**7**
4	Memphis	4

Championship Game; May 28
2	Houston	5
1	**Rice**	**11**

- **Bold** indicates the winner of the game.
- Italics indicate that the team was eliminated from the tournament.

== Finish order ==
Finish	Team	W	L	T	Pct	Seed	Eliminated By
1	Rice^{†}	4	0	0	.1000	1	
2	Houston^{#}	3	1	0	.750	2	Rice
3	Memphis	2	2	0	.500	4	Rice
4	Tulane^{#}	2	2	0	.500	3	Houston
5	Southern Miss^{#}	1	2	0	.333	5	Memphis
6	East Carolina	1	2	0	.333	6	Tulane
7	UAB	0	2	0	.000	8	Rice
8	Marshall	0	2	0	.000	7	Tulane
^{†} - Winner of the tournament and received an automatic bid to the NCAA tournament.^{#} - Received an at-large bid to the NCAA tournament.

== All-tournament team ==
Position	Player	School
C	Ty Wallace	Tulane
IF	Greg Buchanan	Rice
IF	Isa Garcia	Houston
IF	Michael Murray	Memphis
IF	Joe Savery	Rice
OF	Jordan Dodson	Rice
OF	Will Petersen	Memphis
OF	Jake Stewart	Houston
DH/UT	Brad Lincoln	Houston
P	Bobby Bell	Rice
P	Bryce Cox	Rice
P	Luis Flores	Houston
P	Shane Mathews	East Carolina
**MVP**	Joe Savery	Rice
