= 1999 Conference USA baseball tournament =

- Teams: 10
- Format: Play-in round followed by eight-team double-elimination tournament
- Finals site: USA Stadium; Millington, Tennessee
- Champions: Tulane (3rd title)
- Winning coach: Rick Jones (3rd title)
- MVP: Mickey McKee (Tulane)

1999 Conference USA baseball standings
	Conf.				Overall
Team	W		L	PCT	W		L	PCT
No. 24 Houston ‍†‍‍^{y}	20	–	7	.741	40	–	24	.625
No. 21 Tulane ‍‍‡‍^{y}	19	–	8	.704	48	–	17	.738
Southern Miss ‍‍‍^{y}	18	–	9	.667	40	–	23	.635
Memphis ‍‍‍	15	–	12	.556	28	–	26	.519
South Florida ‍‍‍	15	–	12	.556	31	–	27	.534
Louisville ‍‍‍	14	–	13	.519	37	–	19	.661
UNC Charlotte ‍‍‍	13	–	14	.481	26	–	26	.500
Cincinnati ‍‍‍	9	–	18	.333	30	–	29	.508
UAB ‍‍‍	7	–	20	.259	22	–	31	.415
Saint Louis ‍‍‍	5	–	22	.185	19	–	39	.328
† – Conference champion ‡ – Tournament champion y – Invited to the NCAA tournament As of June 30, 1999; Rankings from Collegiate Baseball

The 1999 Conference USA baseball tournament was the 1999 postseason baseball championship of the NCAA Division I Conference USA, held at USA Stadium in Millington, Tennessee, from May 12 through 17. Tulane defeated Houston in the championship game, earning the conference's automatic bid to the 1999 NCAA Division I baseball tournament.

== Regular season results ==
Team	W	L	PCT	GB	Seed
Houston	20	7	.741	-	1
Tulane	19	8	.704	1	2
Southern Miss	18	9	.667	2	3
Memphis	15	12	.556	5	4
South Florida	15	12	.556	5	5
Louisville	14	13	.519	6	6
UNC Charlotte	13	14	.481	7	7
Cincinnati	9	18	.333	11	8
UAB	7	20	.259	13	9
Saint Louis	5	22	.185	15	10

- Records reflect conference play only.

== Bracket ==
=== Play-in games ===
Two play-in games among the four teams with the worst regular season records decided which two teams would have the final two spots in the eight-team double-elimination bracket.

Play-in game
9	UAB	7
**8**	**Cincinnati**	**8**
**10**	**Saint Louis**	**5**
7	UNC Charlotte	2

=== Double-elimination ===
First round
**5**	**South Florida**	**8**
4	Memphis	6
10	Saint Louis	4
**1**	**Houston**	**14**
**10**	**Saint Louis**	**11**
4	Memphis	9
8	Cincinnati	5
**2**	**Tulane**	**10**
6	Louisville	5
**3**	**Southern Miss**	**10**
8	Cincinnati	9
**6**	**Louisville**	**10**

Second round
5	South Florida	3
**1**	**Houston**	**14**
**10**	**Saint Louis**	**16**
5	South Florida	5
3	Southern Miss	4
**2**	**Tulane**	**11**
6	Louisville	2
**3**	**Southern Miss**	**5**

Semifinals
10	Saint Louis	0	–
**1**	**Houston**	**3**	–
3	Southern Miss	7	–
**2**	**Tulane**	**13**	–

Final
**2**	**Tulane**	**12**
1	Houston	9

- **Bold** indicates the winner of the game.
- Italics indicate that the team was eliminated from the tournament.

== All-tournament team ==
Position	Player	School
C	Jarrod Bitter	Houston
IF	Andy Cannizaro	Tulane
IF	Brandon Caraway	Houston
IF	Jake Gautreau	Tulane
IF	Mickey McKee	Tulane
OF	Michael Artman	Southern Miss
OF	Matt Groff	Tulane
OF	Luke Williams	Louisville
DH	Chad Sutter	Tulane
P	Shane Nance	Houston
RP	Bryan Moore	Houston
**MVP**	Mickey McKee	Tulane
