= Greer Field at Turchin Stadium =

Baseball stadium in New Orleans, Louisiana

- GFATS
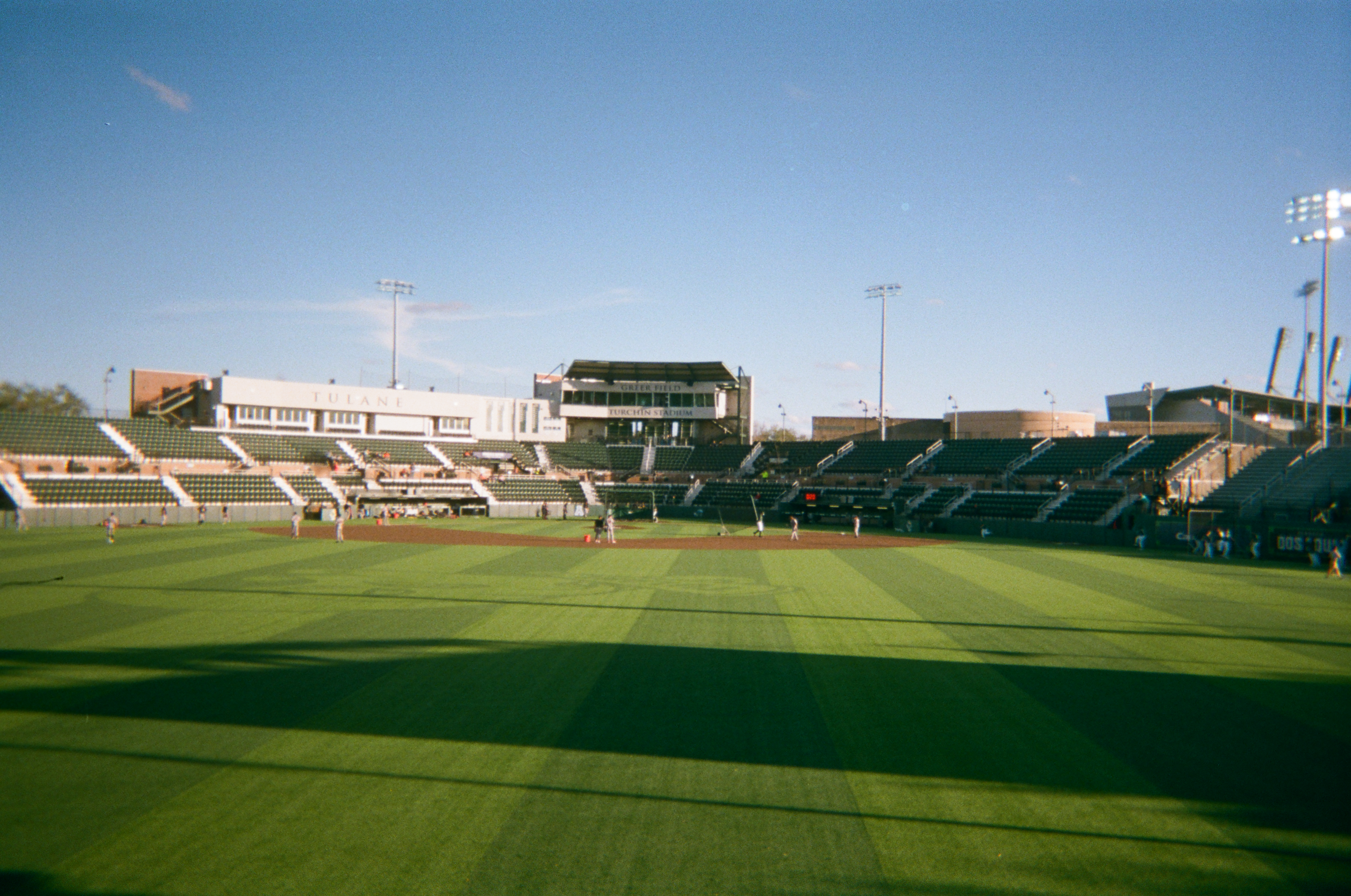
- Interactive map of Greer Field at Turchin Stadium
- Location: Ben Weiner Drive; New Orleans, LA 70118
- Coordinates: 29.94640°N 90.11568°W
- Owner: Tulane University
- Operator: Tulane University
- Capacity: 5,000
- Surface: Hellas Major Play & Thermoblend (artificial turf)
- Record attendance: 5,215 (April 26, 2016, vs. LSU)
- Field size: Foul Lines: 325 feet (99 m); Center Field: 400 feet (122 m); Power Alleys: 370 feet (113 m); Outfield fence height: 8 feet (2 m); Center Field fence height: 12 feet (4 m)

Construction
- Groundbreaking: 1990
- Opened: March 11, 1991
- Renovated: 2005–2007
- Cost: $12 million $10.5 million (renovation)

Tenant
- Tulane Green Wave (NCAA) 1990–present

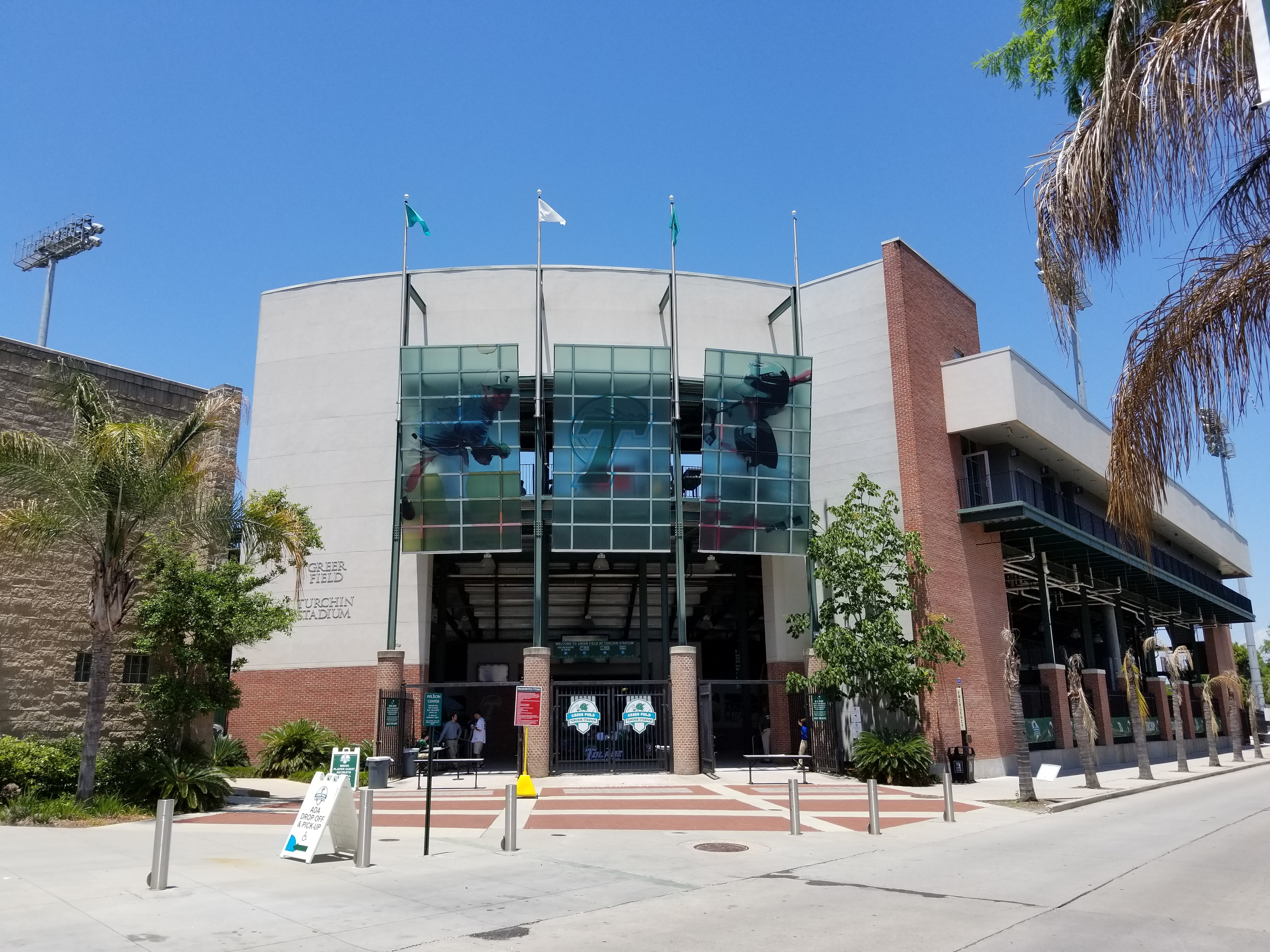
Greer Field at Turchin Stadium

Greer Field at Turchin Stadium is a baseball stadium in New Orleans, Louisiana. It is the on-campus home of the Tulane University Green Wave college baseball team.

From 1893 to 1989, Tulane's home ballpark was Tulane Diamond, which was located about 100 feet (30 m) south of Turchin Stadium's current location.

== History ==
The stadium was named for Robert Turchin, a World War II veteran and 1943 graduate of Tulane, and his wife, Lillian Turchin, who headed the drive in 1990 to build it.

The stadium was in the midst of significant renovations following the 2005 season, but Hurricane Katrina nearly destroyed the facility, forcing the project to start over. Tulane had hoped to move into the renovated Turchin for the 2006 season but played the entire 2006 season at Zephyr Field in nearby Metairie. It was scheduled to be completed in April 2007, but heavy rain during the winter of 2007 pushed back the opening to the 2008 season.

As the university spent $1.5 million before Katrina and was projected to spend $7.5 million after, the final renovation cost was estimated to be about $9 million, but by the end of construction the entirely new stadium had cost $10.5 million to build.

Shortly after construction commenced, the Tulane University Athletics Department "expanded the scope" of the Tulane Athletics Brick Campaign. This mode of fundraising, in which fans could buy commemorative bricks to be placed at the entry of the new stadium, generated unexpected levels of interest, warranting the expansion.

In 2008, at the official reopening, "Greer Field" was added to the name in honor of Phil Greer, chair of the Board of Tulane. The newly renovated Greer Field at Turchin Stadium reopened for the 2008 baseball season on February 22 with a 6–0 win over Illinois-Chicago in front of a sellout crowd of 5,093 fans. Turchin hosted the Conference USA baseball tournament that season.

From 2011 to 2014, Turchin has hosted the Louisiana High School Athletic Association Class 5A (top classification) state tournament.

Tulane has won over 75% of its games in Turchin since its opening. In 2013, the Green Wave ranked 31st among Division I baseball programs attendance, averaging 2,080 per home game.

== Attendance records ==
=== Single game ===
Attendance	Game	Date	Notes
5,215	Tulane vs. LSU	April 26, 2016	2016 Regular Season
5,131	Tulane vs. LSU	April 5, 2011	2011 Regular Season
5,093	Tulane vs. UIC	February 22, 2008	2008 Regular Season Opener
5,063	Tulane vs. LSU	March 6, 2012	2012 Regular Season
5,017	Tulane vs. LSU	April 22, 2008	2008 Regular Season
4,987	Tulane vs. LSU	April 1, 2009	2009 Regular Season
4,708	Tulane vs. Rice	June 13, 2005	2005 NCAA Super Regional
4,700	Tulane vs. LSU	May 18, 2010	2010 Regular Season
4,653	Tulane vs. Rice	June 12, 2005	2005 NCAA Super Regional
4,602	Tulane vs. Rice	June 11, 2005	2005 NCAA Super Regional

=== Year-by-year ===
Season	Average Attendance	Total Attendance	Games
1999	1,283	41,070	32
2000	1,839	55,182	30
2001	2,660	127,670	48
2002	3,150	97,663	31
2003	2,414	86,913	36
2004	3,032	93,982	31
2005	3,720	145,084	39
2006	2,888	106,862	37
2007	2,786	103,070	37
2008	3,600	140,402	39
2009	2,938	99,882	34
2010	2,832	110,432	39
2011	2,759	96,577	35

== Tournaments hosted ==
C-USA Tournament (3): 1997, 2003, 2008
Metro Tournament (1): 1992
NCAA Regional Tournament (2): 2001, 2005
NCAA Super Regional (1): 2005

== See also ==
- List of NCAA Division I baseball venues
