= Brad Lincoln =

American baseball player (born 1985)

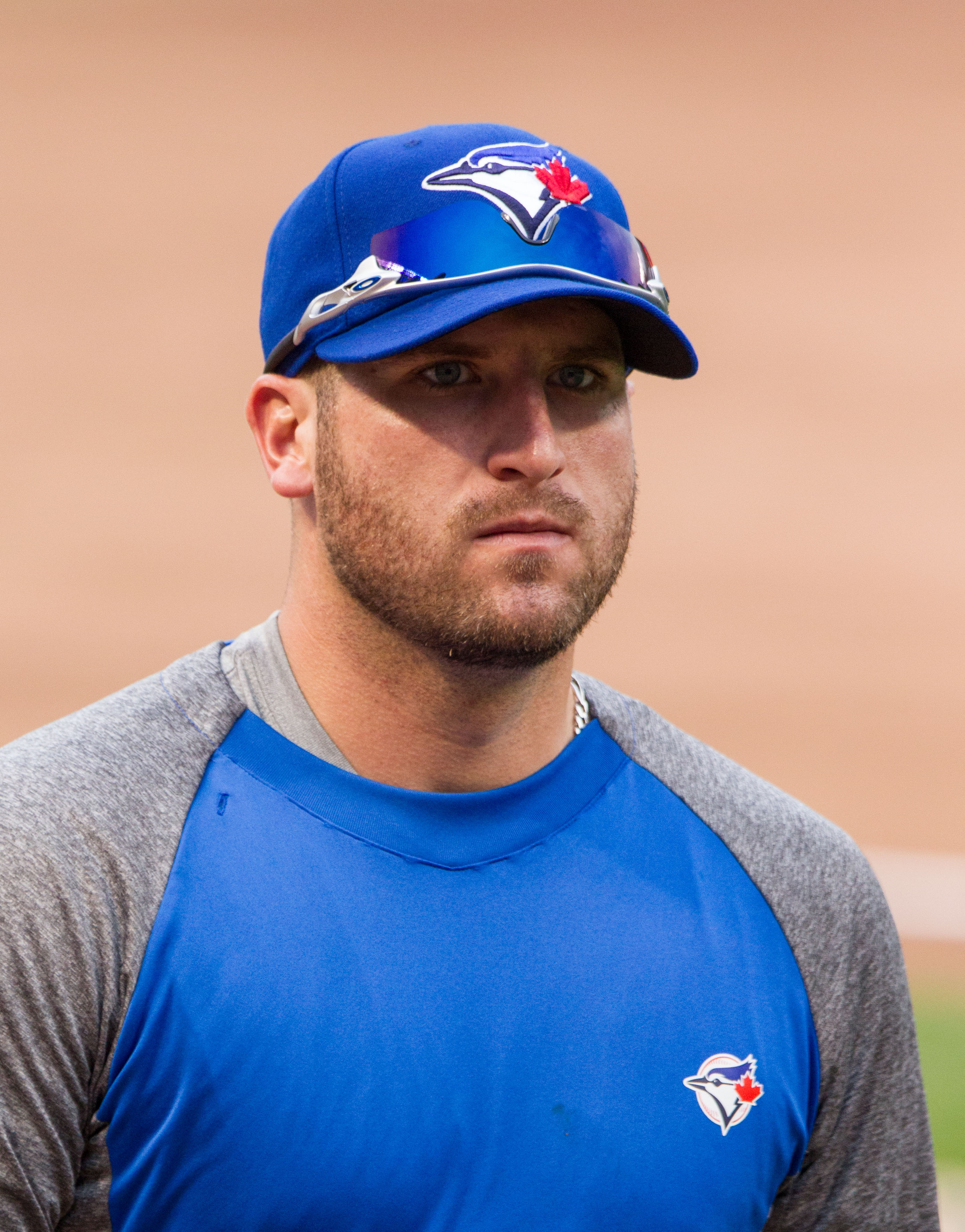
- Lincoln with the Toronto Blue Jays
- Pitcher
- Born: May 25, 1985 (age 41); Lake Jackson, Texas, U.S.
- Batted: Left Threw: Right

MLB debut
- June 9, 2010, for the Pittsburgh Pirates

Last MLB appearance
- April 8, 2014, for the Philadelphia Phillies

MLB statistics
- Win–loss record: 9–11
- Earned run average: 4.74
- Strikeouts: 169
- Stats at Baseball Reference

Teams
- Pittsburgh Pirates (2010–2012); Toronto Blue Jays (2012–2013); Philadelphia Phillies (2014)

Career highlights and awards
- Dick Howser Trophy (2006)
Medals
Men's baseball
Representing United States
Baseball World Cup
Gold medal – first place	2009 Nettuno	National team

Brad Eric Lincoln (born May 25, 1985) is an American former professional baseball pitcher. He played in Major League Baseball (MLB) for the Pittsburgh Pirates, Toronto Blue Jays, and Philadelphia Phillies. Prior to playing professionally, he attended the University of Houston, where he played college baseball for the Houston Cougars.

== Amateur career ==
Lincoln played baseball for Brazoswood High School of Clute, Texas, though he also played on the football team, and did not concentrate exclusively on baseball until after his sophomore year. After his senior season, the Texas Rangers selected him in the 28th round of the 2003 draft, but he elected to attend college rather than turning pro at that time.

He matriculated at the University of Houston, where he played college baseball for the Houston Cougars baseball team. In 2005, he played collegiate summer baseball in the Cape Cod Baseball League for the Bourne Braves, where he was named an all-star, and received the league's 10th Player award.

He began the 2006 season by being named the Most Outstanding Player of the Houston College Classic. For the season, he posted a 12–2 win–loss record and a 1.69 earned run average (ERA), with 152 strikeouts in 127 2/3 innings pitched, and also excelled with the bat, achieving a .295 batting average with 14 home runs and a team-leading 53 RBI. At the end of the season, he was named to the Conference USA All-Tournament Team, recognized as the Conference USA Pitcher of the Year, and won several major national awards, including the Dick Howser Trophy and the Brooks Wallace Award. He was also one of four finalists for the Roger Clemens Award, but lost out to Andrew Miller of the University of North Carolina.

== Professional career ==
=== Pittsburgh Pirates ===
Scouts regarded Lincoln as one of the best players eligible for the 2006 draft, and the Pittsburgh Pirates chose him with the fourth overall selection of the first round, with the intention of advancing him through their system quickly. Lincoln received $2.75 million to sign with the Pirates, and almost immediately encountered injury problems. An oblique strain limited him to 24 innings in 2006, and then he had Tommy John surgery on his right arm in April 2007, which sidelined him for the entire year. He first experienced elbow pain while pitching in the Florida Instructional League in late 2006, and then the pain recurred in spring training in 2007, leading to the discovery of the injury and the subsequent operation, performed by Dr. James Andrews in Birmingham, Alabama.

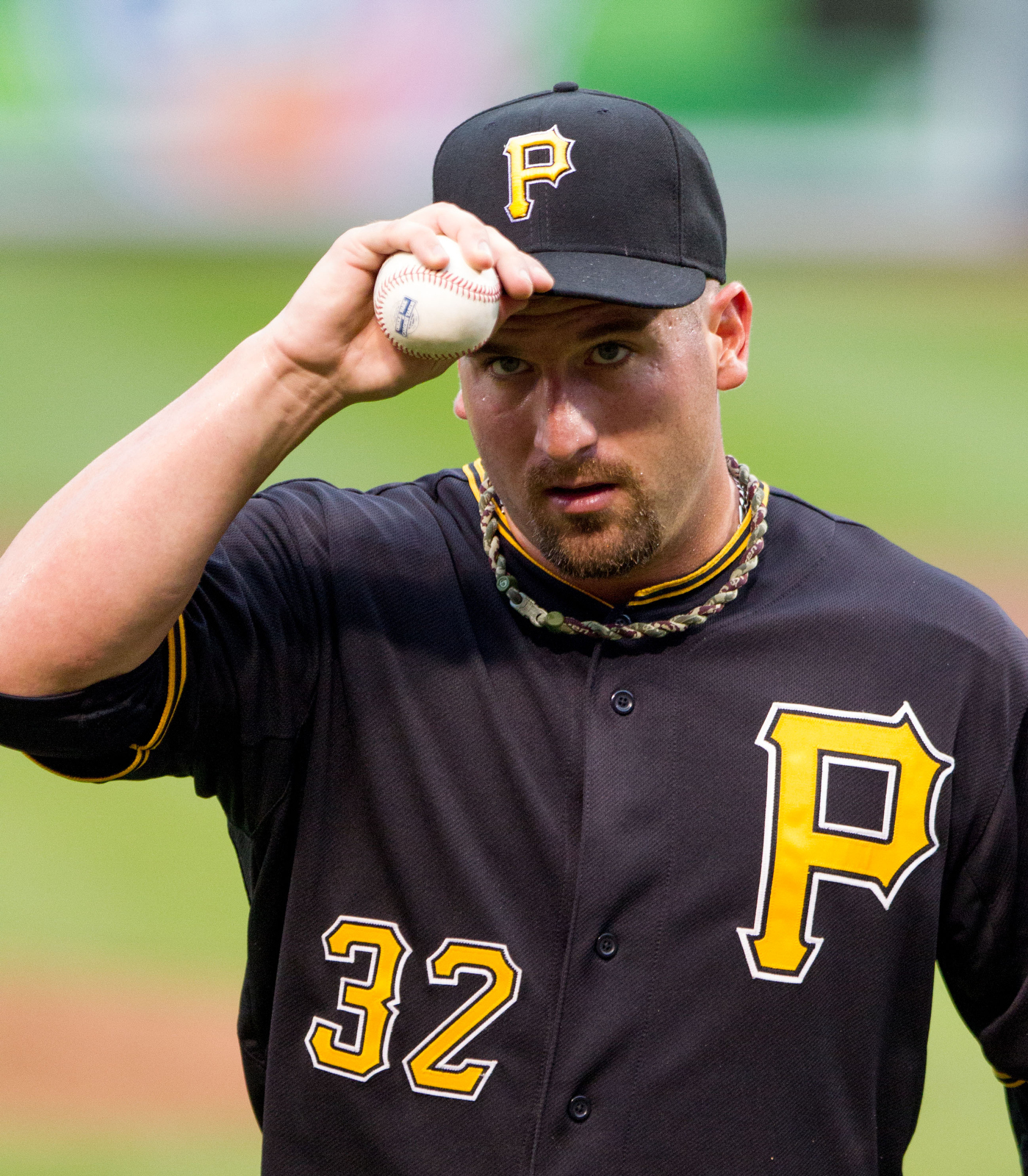
Lincoln with the Pirates in 2012.

Lincoln returned with the Class A Hickory Crawdads of the South Atlantic League in 2008, and was promoted to the Class A-Advanced Lynchburg Hillcats of the Carolina League at midseason. In 2009, he started 13 games for the Double-A Altoona Curve of the Eastern League with a 1–5 win–loss record and a 2.28 earned run average (ERA). before moving up to the Indianapolis Indians, the Pirates' Triple-A affiliate in the International League in June, 2009. Lincoln started 12 games, compiled a 6–2 record with a 4.70 ERA.

Lincoln made his MLB debut on the mound on June 9, 2010 against the Washington Nationals. He went 6 innings giving up 5 earned runs allowing 2 walks and recording 3 strikeouts. His first strikeout was against John Lannan. He was 6–2 with a 3.16 ERA in 11 starts for Indianapolis prior to that point. Lincoln earned his first Major League victory on June 30, 2010 by pitching a shutout against the Chicago Cubs at Wrigley Field. He pitched seven innings, striking out six and walking just one as the Pirates won 2–0.

Lincoln was demoted back to Triple-A after his fourth loss of the season on July 25, 2010 against the San Diego Padres. It marked the third time in four July starts where he allowed 5 or more earned runs, including a night where he was spotted a 9–0 lead to work with after the 1st inning against the Milwaukee Brewers yet failed to get out of the 3rd inning. Pirates General Manager Neal Huntington cited a drop in Lincoln's velocity since he was promoted and that he had strayed from his mechanics.

Lincoln was called back to the majors on July 2, 2011 to pitch in a Game 2 of a Pirates doubleheader against the Nationals. During the game, he pitched six innings and gave Pittsburgh a chance to sweep the doubleheader in front of 39,638 at Nationals Park. However the Pirates bullpen failed to hold on to game allowing the Nationals to a 4–3 rally. The Pirates optioned Lincoln back to Indianapolis the next day, when they recalled Chris Leroux to add depth to the bullpen.

Lincoln started the 2012 season at Triple-A Indianapolis. Lincoln was recalled April 18. For the 2012 season, Lincoln was being used by the Pirates as a long relief or a spot starter. On July 30, 2012, he was traded to the Toronto Blue Jays for Travis Snider.

=== Toronto Blue Jays ===
Lincoln made his Blue Jay debut on August 1, 2012, against the Seattle Mariners and threw 1.1 innings without yielding a hit.

Lincoln started the 2013 season with the Triple-A Buffalo Bisons until he was called up by the Blue Jays on April 25. Lincoln was optioned back to the Bisons on April 28 when Adam Lind returned from paternity leave. Lincoln was recalled by the Blue Jays on May 2 when Josh Johnson was placed on the disabled list. On June 8, after pitching four scoreless innings in an 18 inning victory over the Texas Rangers, Lincoln was optioned back to the Buffalo Bisons. Lincoln was recalled on August 3, and optioned back to the Bisons on August 24.

=== Philadelphia Phillies ===
On December 3, 2013, Lincoln was traded to the Philadelphia Phillies for catcher Erik Kratz and pitcher Rob Rasmussen. Lincoln was outrighted to the minors on April 12, 2014, to make room on the active roster for Jonathan Pettibone.

=== Second stint with Pittsburgh ===
On November 18, 2014, Lincoln signed a minor league contract with the Pittsburgh Pirates.
