= Rolan Walton =

American baseball player and coach (1929–2022)

Biographical details
- Born: May 27, 1929; San Antonio, Texas, U.S.
- Died: July 14, 2022 (aged 93); Houston, Texas, U.S.

Playing career
- 1948–1951: Houston
- 1952–1954: Austin Pioneers
- Position: Shortstop

Coaching career (HC unless noted)
- 1974: Houston (assistant)
- 1975–1986: Houston

Head coaching record
- Overall: 378–235–5 (.616)

Accomplishments and honors

Awards
- 2x SWC Coach of the Year (1976, 1982); No. 6 retired by Houston Cougars

Rolan Wilson Walton (May 27, 1929 – July 14, 2022) was an American baseball player and coach. He was the fifth head coach of the Houston Cougars baseball team from 1975 to 1986. While at Houston, Walton compiled a 378–235–5 record with two NCAA Regional appearances.

== Head coaching record ==
Record table
Season	Team	Overall	Conference	Standing	Postseason
Houston Cougars (Southwest Conference) (1975–1986)
1975	Houston	18–25	8–16	8th	
1976	Houston	31–15	16–8	3rd	
1977	Houston	27–17–1	11–12–1	6th	
1978	Houston	30–21	14–10	4th	
1979	Houston	27–17	11–13	5th	
1980	Houston	17–28–1	6–17–1	9th	
1981	Houston	32–20–1	11–9–1	3rd	
1982	Houston	42–14–2	13–6	2nd	NCAA Regional
1983	Houston	43–15	13–8	T–2nd	
1984	Houston	32–23	6–15	T–7th	
1985	Houston	44–17	12–9	T–4th	NCAA Regional
1986	Houston	35–23	8–13	5th	
Houston:		378–235–5 (.616)	129–136–3 (.487)		
Total:		378–235–5 (.616)			
