= 2000 Houston Cougars baseball team =

American college baseball season

2000 Houston Cougars baseball

C-USA tournament champions C-USA regular season champions Houston Regional champions

Houston Super Regional, 1–2
- Conference: Conference USA

Ranking
- Coaches: No. 12
- CB: No. 13
- Record: 48–18 (21–4 C-USA)
- Head coach: Rayner Noble (6th season)
- Home stadium: Cougar Field

2000 Conference USA baseball standings
	Conf.						Overall
Team	W		L		T	PCT	W		L		T	PCT
No. 13 Houston ‍†‍‡‍^{y}	21	–	4	–	0	.840	48	–	18	–	0	.727
Tulane ‍‍‍^{y}	20	–	6	–	1	.759	38	–	22	–	1	.631
Southern Miss ‍‍‍	14	–	9	–	0	.609	32	–	26	–	0	.552
Charlotte ‍‍‍	15	–	11	–	0	.577	32	–	25	–	1	.560
South Florida ‍‍‍	14	–	13	–	0	.519	29	–	29	–	0	.500
Cincinnati ‍‍‍	11	–	16	–	0	.407	35	–	16	–	0	.686
UAB ‍‍‍	10	–	15	–	0	.400	28	–	32	–	0	.467
Louisville ‍‍‍	10	–	16	–	1	.389	17	–	37	–	1	.318
Memphis ‍‍‍	8	–	18	–	0	.308	15	–	37	–	0	.288
Saint Louis ‍‍‍	6	–	21	–	0	.222	19	–	34	–	0	.358
† – Conference champion ‡ – Tournament champion y – Invited to the NCAA tournament Rankings from Collegiate Baseball

The 2000 Houston Cougars baseball team represented the University of Houston in the 2000 intercollegiate baseball season. Houston competed in Division I of the National Collegiate Athletic Association (NCAA) in its fourth season as a member of Conference USA. The Cougars played home games at Cougar Field on the university's campus in Houston, Texas. Sixth-year head coach Rayner Noble, a former pitcher for the team during the 1980 through 1983 seasons and an assistant coach from 1987 through 1990, led the Cougars.

Upon winning the inaugural Conference USA tournament, Houston entered the 2000 NCAA Division I baseball tournament for the thirteenth time in school history. They hosted the Houston Regional, where they defeated Rice to advance to the super regional round for the first time in school history. Although hosting the Houston Super Regional, they were defeated by San Jose State in a three-game series.
