= Ned Thompson =

American sports coach (1910–2011)

Biographical details
- Born: January 10, 1910; Hayes Center, Nebraska, U.S.
- Died: December 22, 2011 (aged 101); Houston, Texas, U.S.

Playing career
- 1929–1933: Sam Houston State

Coaching career (HC unless noted)

Football
- 1946–1948: Houston (backfield)

Baseball
- 1947: Houston

Administrative career (AD unless noted)
- 1946–1976: Houston (associate AD)
- 1976–1986: Houston Baptist (associate AD)

Head coaching record
- Overall: 1–5 (college baseball)

Edward William Thompson (January 10, 1910 – December 22, 2011) was an American football, basketball, and baseball coach. Thompson was born in Hayes Center, Nebraska, on January 10, 1910. He moved to Danbury, Texas, at the age of 15 and graduated from nearby Angleton High School. Following high school, he attended Sam Houston State University, where he earned a Bachelor of Science degree in 1933.

Thompson returned to Angleton, and began his coaching career as a football coach for Angleton High School, where he posted a record of 17–18–2 from 1934 to 1937. Following a stint at Richmond High School (Lamar Consolidated High School since 1948), he then worked for Pasadena High School as a coach for all of the boys teams from 1942 to 1946. During his final season as head coach for Pasadena's boys basketball, his team won the University Interscholastic League Class A boys basketball state championship.

Thompson left Pasadena High School, and became the first baseball coach for 1947, backfield coach in football from 1946 to 1948 for the University of Houston. He also served as associate athletic director in charge of business finances from 1946 to 1976. Among the players for his 1947 baseball team was pitcher Bill Henry who had been a forward on Thompson's state championship basketball team the year prior. Following his 1947 efforts for Houston, Henry went on to become Houston's first player to play Major League Baseball, where he enjoyed a seventeen-year career. Thompson remained at Houston until he left for the same position at Houston Baptist University.

Thompson died on December 22, 2011, at the age of 101. He was interred at South Park Cemetery in Pearland, Texas.

== Head coaching record ==
=== College baseball ===
Record table
Season	Team	Overall	Conference	Standing	Postseason
Houston Cougars (Independent) (1947)
1947	Houston	1–5			
Houston:		1–5			
Total:		1–5			
