= Bragg Stockton =

American baseball player and coach (1938–2003)

Biographical details
- Born: September 30, 1938
- Died: January 21, 2003 (aged 64); Pasadena, Texas, U.S.

Playing career
- 1957–1958: Tarleton State
- 1959–1960: Sul Ross State

Coaching career (HC unless noted)
- 1965–1969: Jones HS (TX)
- 1970–1980: San Jacinto College
- 1981–1983: Houston (assistant)
- 1984–1986: TCU
- 1987–1994: Houston
- 2002: Houston (assistant)

Head coaching record
- Overall: 374–251–4 (.598) (college)

Bragg Alexander Stockton Jr. (September 30, 1938 – January 21, 2003) was an American baseball player and coach. He was the head coach of San Jacinto College from 1970 to 1980, TCU from 1984 to 1986, and Houston from 1987 to 1994.

== Head coaching record ==
=== College ===
Record table
Season	Team	Overall	Conference	Standing	Postseason
TCU Horned Frogs (Southwest Conference) (1984–1986)
1984	TCU	25–22	6–15	T–7th	
1985	TCU	35–17	9–12	6th	
1986	TCU	31–29	5–16	T–7th	
TCU:		91–68 (.572)	20–43 (.317)		
Houston Cougars (Southwest Conference) (1987–1994)
1987	Houston	40–24–1	11–10	4th	NCAA Regional
1988	Houston	33–22–3	6–14	7th	
1989	Houston	43–17	9–12	T–4th	
1990	Houston	44–23	12–9	3rd	NCAA Regional
1991	Houston	37–19	10–11	T–4th	
1992	Houston	25–28	13–21	7th	
1993	Houston	31–24	3–15	7th	
1994	Houston	30–26	4–14	7th	
Houston:		283–183–4 (.606)	68–106 (.391)		
Total:		374–251–4 (.598)			
