= Rayner Noble =

American baseball coach and player

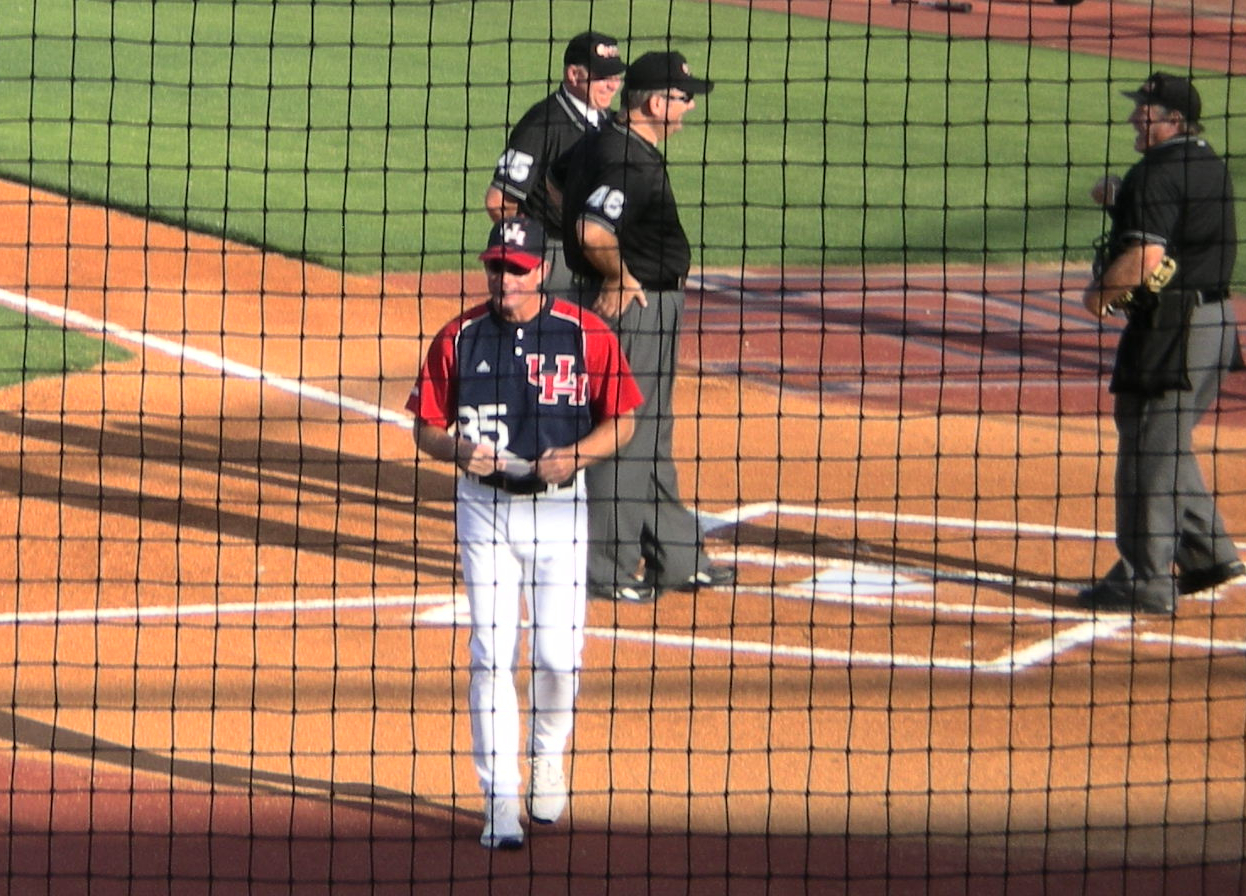
- Noble at Cougar Field in 2008

Biographical details
- Born: August 7, 1961 (age 65); Crowell, Texas, U.S.

Playing career
- 1980–1983: Houston
- 1983–1984: Daytona Beach Astros
- 1985–1986: Columbus Astros
- 1986–1987: Tucson Toros
- Position: Pitcher

Coaching career (HC unless noted)
- 1987–1990: Houston (assistant)
- 1991–1994: Rice (assistant)
- 1995–2010: Houston

Head coaching record
- Overall: 551–420 (.567)

Accomplishments and honors

Championships
- 3 C-USA tournament (1997, 2000, 2008); 3 C-USA regular season (1999, 2000, 2002)

Awards
- 2x C-USA Coach of the Year (1999, 2000); ABCA South Central Region Coach of the Year (2002)

James Rayner Noble (born August 7, 1961) is an American former baseball coach and player. He last served as head coach at the University of Houston. In his 16 years coaching Houston, he is the winningest coach in program history. Noble's career coaching record is 551–420 (.567).

A native of Houston, Texas, Noble attended Spring Woods High School and holds both a bachelor's and master's degree from the University of Houston.

From 1983 to 1987, Noble played Minor League Baseball in the Houston Astros organization.

Noble wore one of the highest numbers in college baseball (#85, as opposed to his playing #9), which he said he wore to remind himself of becoming a Christian in 1985.

He became the fifth head coach in the university's history on May 26, 1994.

In 1998 he ran two baseball summer camp training sessions. The first was for players aged 7 to 12, the second for ages 10 to high schoolers expecting to graduate in 1999. The camps ran for one week each in July.

After suffering the first consecutive losing seasons of his career, UH parted ways with Noble on June 4, 2010.

He was hired on as coach at Second Baptist in 2019, replacing another former Astros player, Lance Berkman.

== Accolades ==
Noble was voted the team MVP when playing for the Houston Cougars in 1983. He was also named the Conference Player of the Year that year.

Noble received the Coach of the Year award in 1999 from Conference USA. He received the honor again in 2000.

In 2002, Noble was named ABCA South Central Region Coach of the Year.

On September 17, 2021, Noble was inducted into the University of Houston Hall of Honor.

== Head coaching record ==
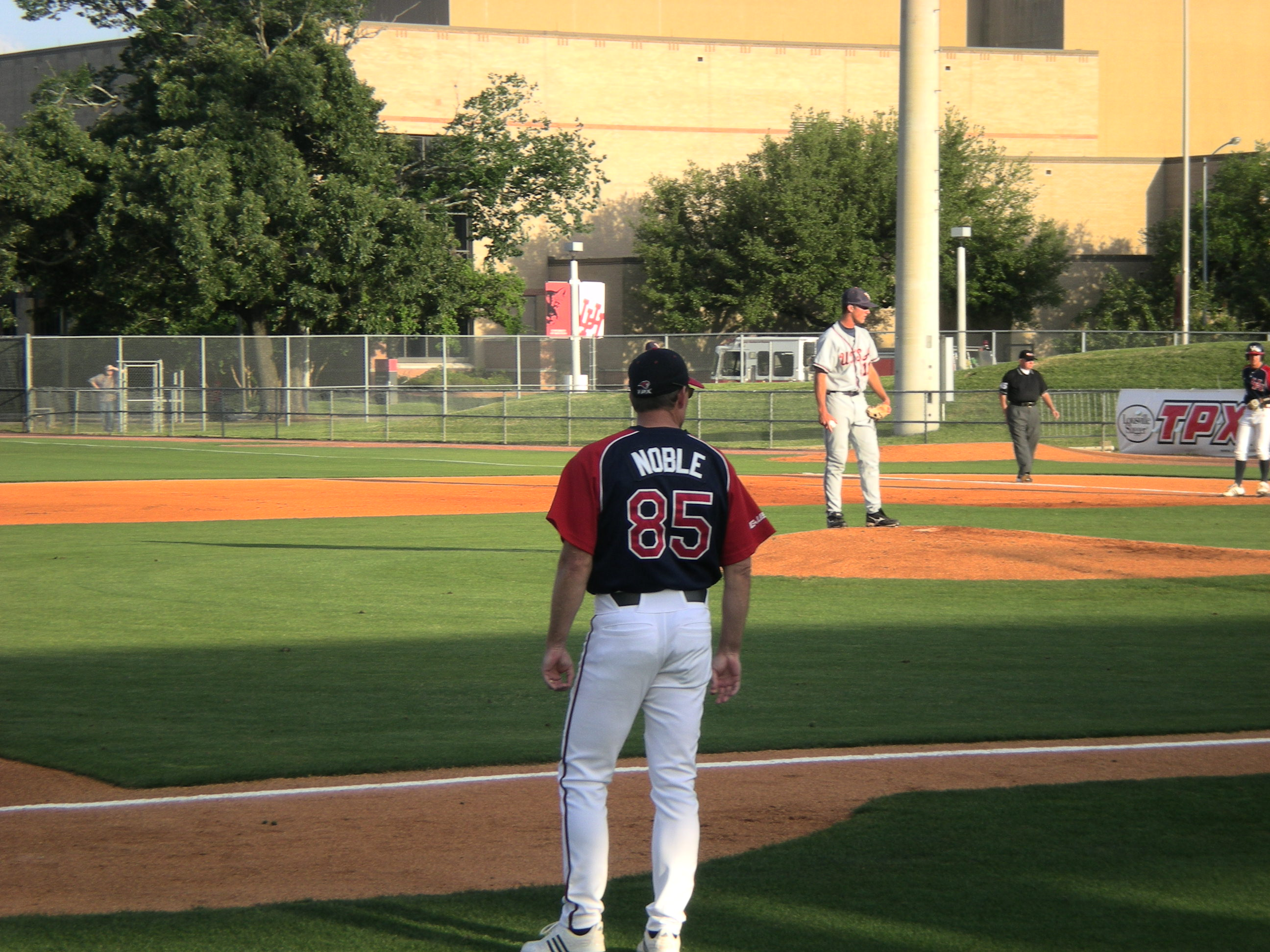
Noble in 2008

Record table
| Season | Team | Overall | Conference | Standing | Postseason |
|---|---|---|---|---|---|
Houston Cougars (Southwest Conference) (1995–1996)
| 1995 | Houston | 26–29 | 6–18 | 7th | |
| 1996 | Houston | 29–28 | 9–15 | T–6th | |
Houston Cougars (Conference USA) (1997–2010)
| 1997 | Houston | 40–23 | 19–8 | 2nd | NCAA Regional |
| 1998 | Houston | 34–25 | 21–6 | 2nd | |
| 1999 | Houston | 40–24 | 20–7 | 1st | NCAA Regional |
| 2000 | Houston | 48–18 | 21–4 | 1st | NCAA Super Regional |
| 2001 | Houston | 29–30 | 20–7 | 2nd | NCAA Regional |
| 2002 | Houston | 48–17 | 22–7 | 1st | NCAA Super Regional |
| 2003 | Houston | 37–30 | 18–12 | 4th | NCAA Super Regional |
| 2004 | Houston | 30–29 | 19–11 | T–4th | |
| 2005 | Houston | 29–30 | 16–13 | 5th | |
| 2006 | Houston | 39–22 | 18–6 | 2nd | NCAA Regional |
| 2007 | Houston | 28–28 | 12–12 | T–4th | |
| 2008 | Houston | 42–24 | 14–10 | 4th | NCAA Regional |
| 2009 | Houston | 27–31 | 13–11 | T–3rd | |
| 2010 | Houston | 25–32 | 11–13 | T–5th | |
| Houston: | | 551–420 (.567) | 259–162 (.615) | | |
| Total: | | 551–420 (.567) | | | |
National champion Postseason invitational champion Conference regular season champion Conference regular season and conference tournament champion Division regular season champion Division regular season and conference tournament champion Conference tournament champion
