= Houston Cougars baseball =

Baseball team of the University of Houston

- 2027 Houston Cougars baseball team
- Founded: 1947; 79 years ago
- University: University of Houston
- Head coach: Will Davis (1st season)
- Conference: Big 12 Conference
- Location: Houston, Texas
- Home stadium: Schroeder Park (capacity: 5,000)
- Nickname: Cougars
- Colors: Scarlet and white

College World Series runner-up
- 1967

College World Series appearances
- 1953, 1967

NCAA regional champions
- 2000, 2002, 2003, 2014

NCAA tournament appearances
- 1951, 1953, 1958, 1960, 1966, 1967, 1982, 1985, 1987, 1990, 1997, 1999, 2000, 2001, 2002, 2003, 2006, 2008, 2014, 2015, 2017, 2018

Conference tournament champions
- 1951, 1953, 1960, 1997, 2000, 2008, 2014, 2017

Conference regular season champions
- 1950, 1951, 1952, 1953, 1960, 1999, 2000, 2002, 2015, 2017, 2018

The Houston Cougars baseball team is the college baseball team of the University of Houston. Along with the university's other athletic teams, the baseball team is a member of the Big 12 Conference as a Division I team. They play their home games at Schroeder Park. In addition to 22 NCAA tournament appearances, the Cougars have made four Super Regional and two College World Series appearances. Houston's head coach will be Will Davis, who was hired in May 2026 and will begin his tenure with the 2027 season. The team was most recently led by Todd Whitting, from 2011 to 2026.

== History ==
=== Early years and Lovette Hill era ===
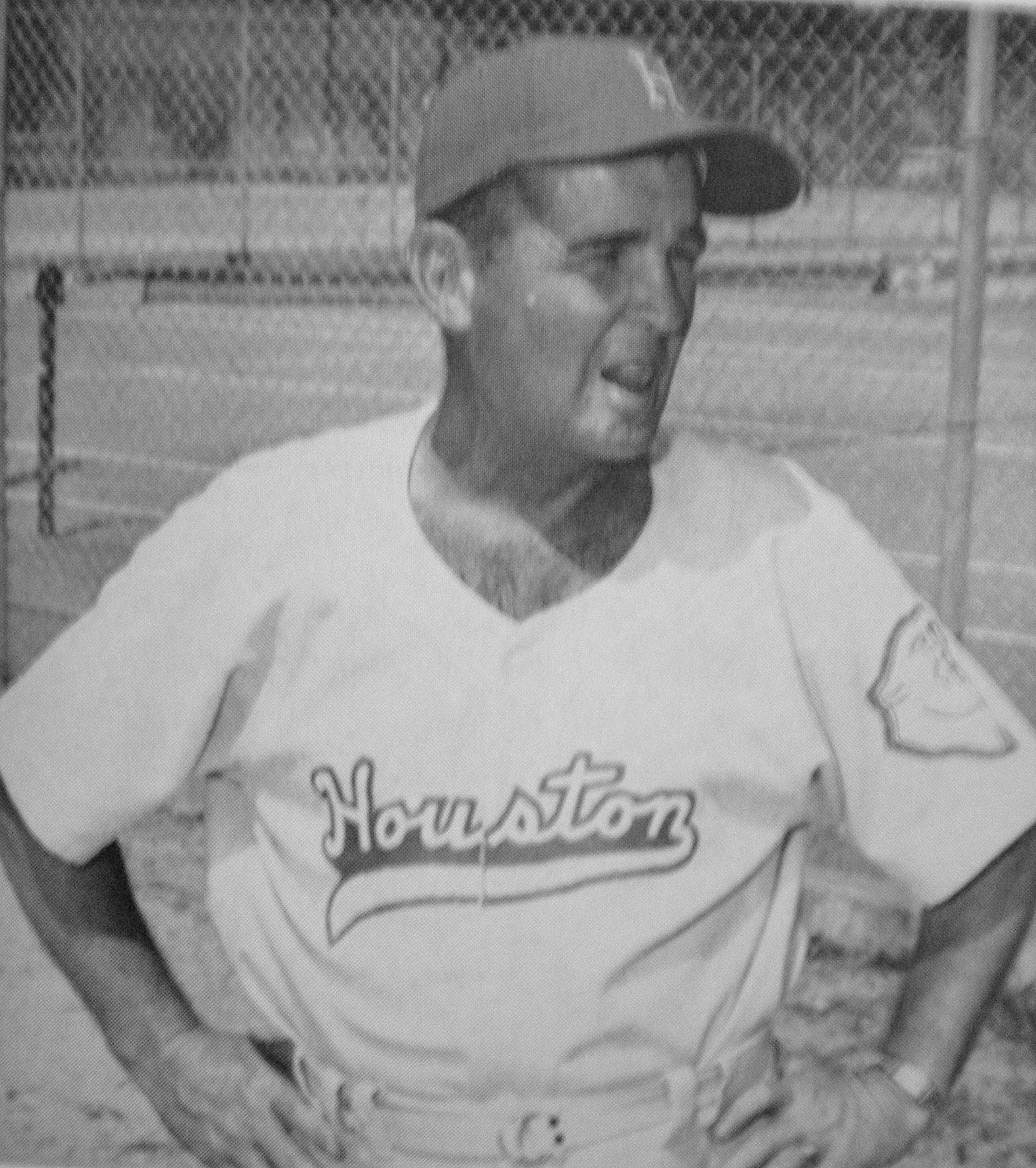
Lovette Hill, ca. 1958

The University of Houston's baseball program started in 1947. Head coach Ned Thompson was hired from Pasadena High School, and became the first baseball coach for 1947, backfield coach in football from 1946 to 1948 for the University of Houston. He also served as associate athletic director in charge of business finances from 1946 to 1976. Among the players for his 1947 baseball team was pitcher Bill Henry who had been a forward on Thompson's state high school championship basketball team the year prior. Following his 1947 efforts for Houston, Henry went on to become Houston's first player to play Major League Baseball, where he enjoyed an 18-year career.

During the first few years of the baseball team's existence, head coaches came and went, and after the third season, the team had already been through three. Houston's fourth head baseball coach, Lovette Hill broke this trend when taking over for the 1950 season. A year after Hill became coach, the Houston Cougars appeared in their first NCAA Regional. The 1953 season was one of the team's most historic and winningest years as they made their first College World Series appearance. Continuing with Hill, the Cougars appeared in several more NCAA Regionals throughout the 1950s and 1960s. Appearing in the finals of the 1967 College World Series against the Arizona State Sun Devils, the Cougars finished runner-up and with a #2 national ranking. The team also began playing their home games at nearby Buffalo Stadium, before moving into an on-campus facility. Also during this time, the University of Houston discontinued their stint as being independent from any college athletic conference, and joined the now defunct Southwest Conference in 1973.

=== Walton era ===
After a 25-year tenure with the Cougars, Lovette Hill retired, and Rolan Walton took over as head coach. Walton had previously played for the Cougars in the early years under Hill. He later played as a shortstop for the Victoria Rosebuds, a Texas League team, before leaving in 1954. During Walton's time as coach, the Cougars appeared in two more NCAA Regionals throughout the 1980s.

=== Stockton era ===
In 1987, the University of Houston hired Bragg Stockton as head coach, and appeared in another NCAA Regional the same year. Before Stockton retired after the 1994 season, the Cougars made one more NCAA Regional appearance. Playing under Stockton were several standout players including Rayner Noble. After a brief stint of playing in Minor League Baseball, Noble returned to the University of Houston as an assistant coach under Stockton. In 1994, following Stockton's retirement, Noble was named head coach of the Cougars. Stockton however, was not completely done with the team, and returned for the 2002 season as a volunteer coach. Working with Noble for only a year, Stockton died.

=== Noble era ===
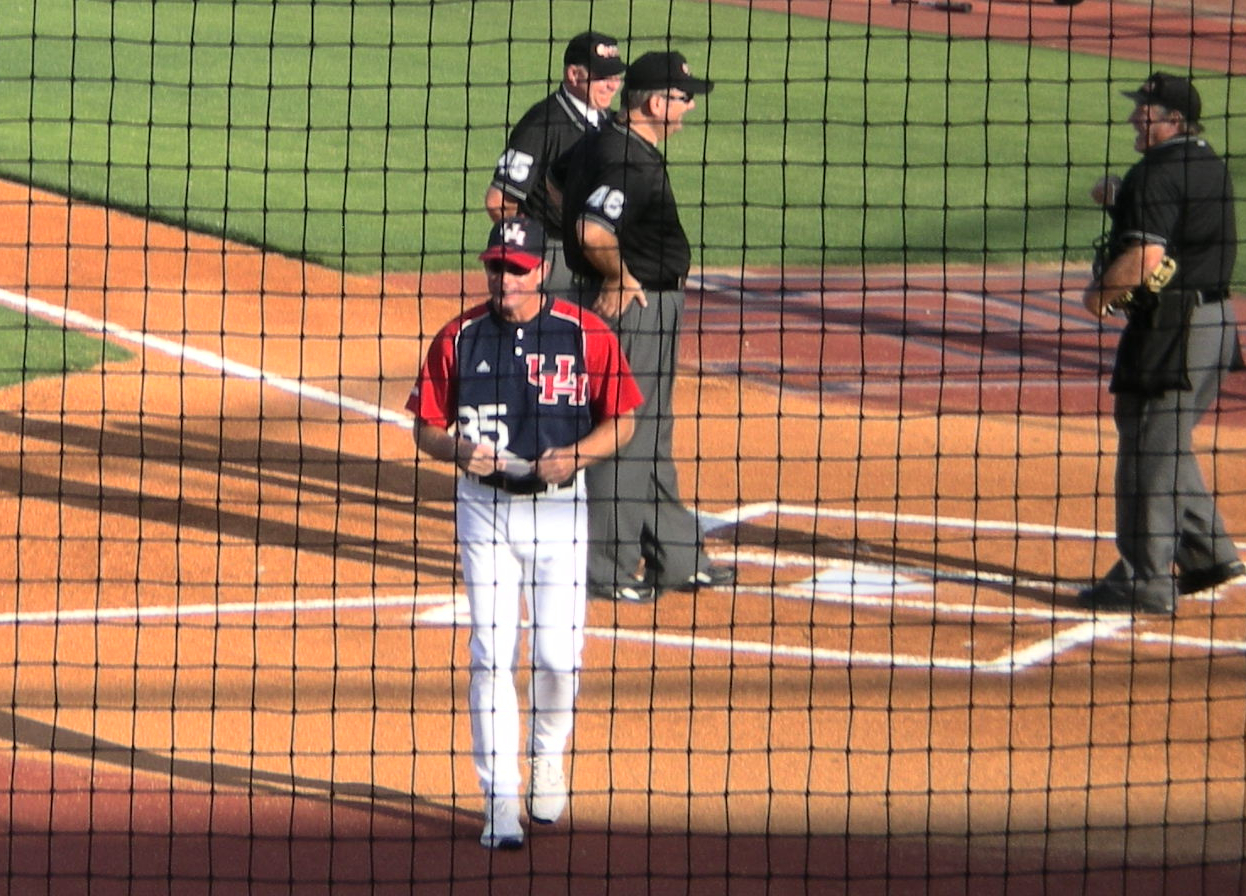
Rayner Noble at Cougar Field

After becoming head coach of the Cougars in 1994, Rayner Noble launched the Cougars to more NCAA Regional appearances than any other coach in the team's history. In addition to eight of such appearances, the Cougars have appeared in three NCAA Super Regionals. In 1995, the Cougars baseball team received a newly constructed Cougar Field that seated 5,000. The following year was the last for the Southwest Conference, and in 1997 the Cougars joined Conference USA. In 2004, the Cougars played San Diego State at Petco Park in front of 40,106, the largest college baseball crowd to date.

In 2006, pitcher Brad Lincoln won the Dick Howser Trophy. Lincoln was the first to receive this award in the program's history, and in Conference USA. He also received the Brooks Wallace Award that year among other honors.

In Conference USA, the Cougars appeared in every Conference USA baseball tournament, and held the second most number of tournament titles (behind Tulane).

Despite becoming the program's winningest coach, Noble's 2009 and 2010 records were back-to-back losing seasons, which Houston had not seen since 1974 and 1975.

=== Whitting era ===
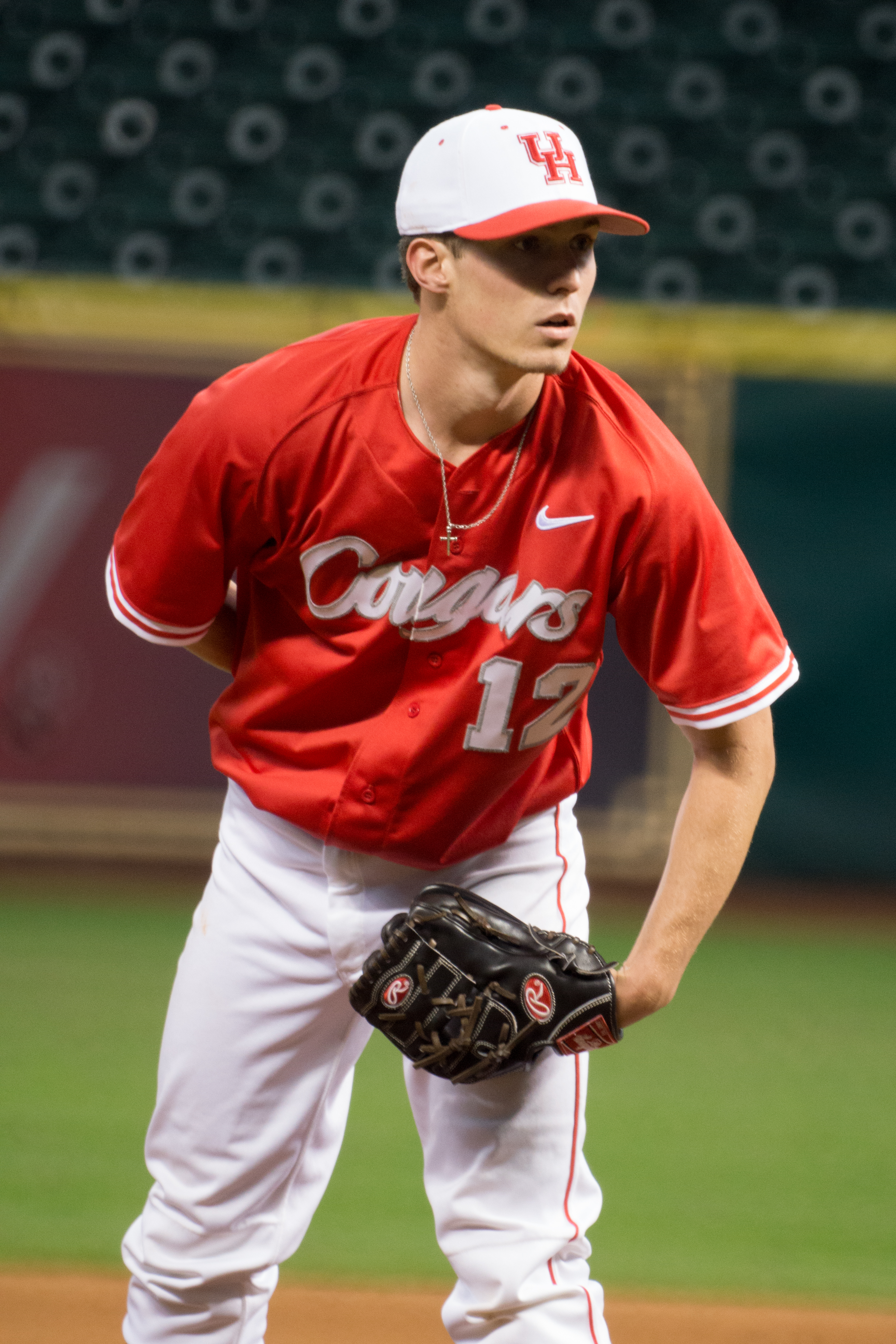
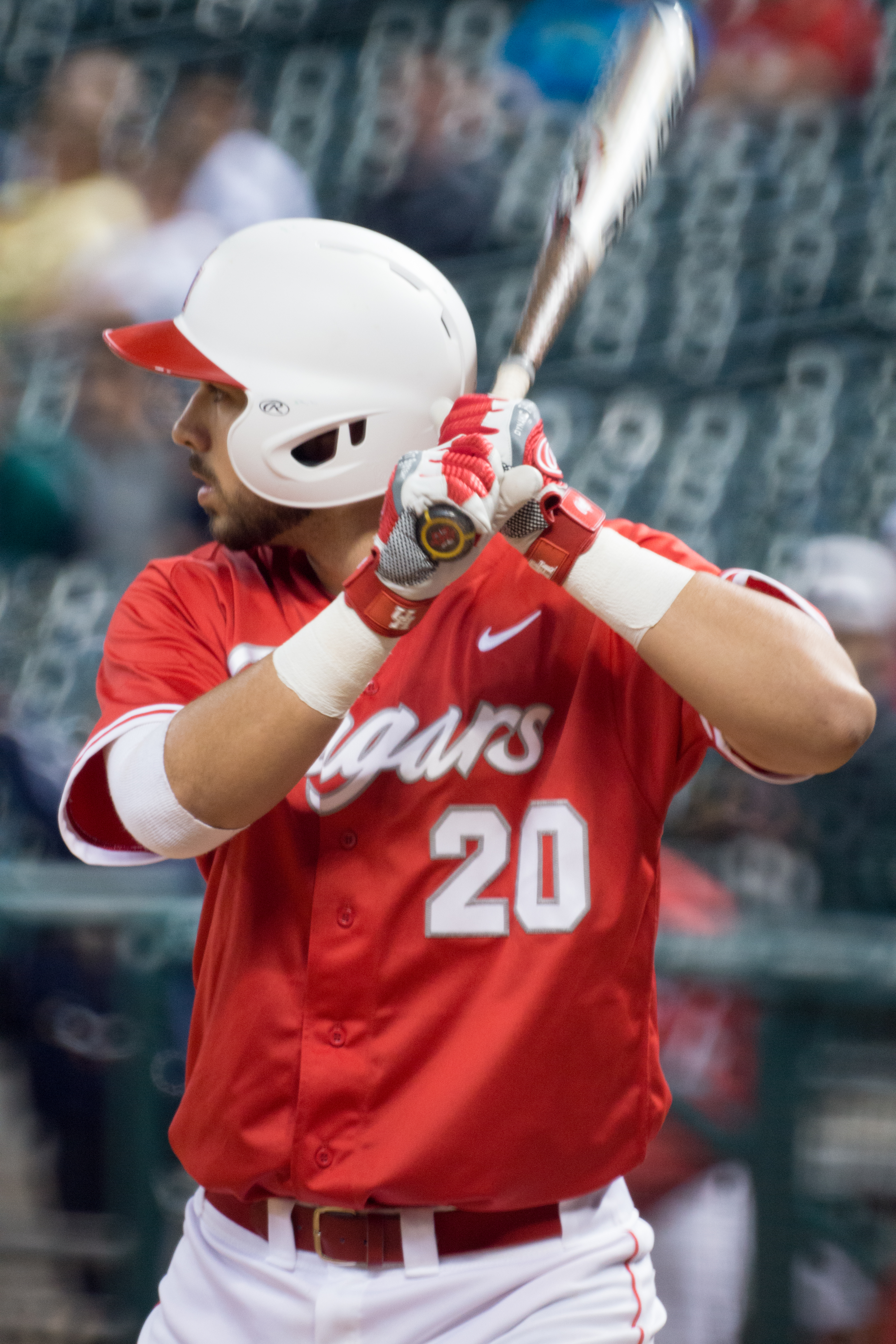
Jared Robinson (left) and Justin Montemayor (right) with the Cougars during a game at Minute Maid Park in 2014.

In 2010, it was announced that Rayner Noble would not return as head coach. Former Houston assistant coach and player Todd Whitting was announced as his replacement. Whitting had served in various positions with TCU, ultimately serving as associate head coach before returning to his alma mater.

In the 2013 season after rebuilding the team for two years, Whitting led the Houston Cougar Baseball team to its best start in 24 seasons. In March 2013, for the first time in seven years, with Whitting at the helm, the Cougars were ranked in the top twenty by Baseball America.

Houston's Cougar Field (now Schroeder Park) received substantial renovations at the end of the 2013 calendar year thanks to major donations from alumni and former players. FieldTurf was installed to replace the natural grass and bullpens were upgraded, giving the stadium a makeover.

In 2014, the Cougars joined the American Athletic Conference for its inaugural season. Riding the momentum of the 2013 season, the Cougars continued their success into 2014 and won the inaugural AAC conference tournament. The Cougars finished the 2014 regular season with a 44–15 record and ranking as high as number 9 nationally. This was also the first season since 1993 that the Cougars swept powerhouse Rice and claimed the Silver Glove Series.

Whitting was not retained after the 2026 season.

=== Davis era ===
Will Davis was hired as Houston baseball's ninth head coach on May 26, 2026.

== Conference affiliations ==
- Independent (1947)
- Lone Star Conference (1948)
- Independent (1949)
- Gulf Coast Conference (1950)
- Missouri Valley Conference (1951–1960)
- Independent (1961–1972)
- Southwest Conference (1973–1996)
- Conference USA (1997–2013)
- American Athletic Conference (2014–2023)
- Big 12 Conference (2024–present)

== Head coaches ==
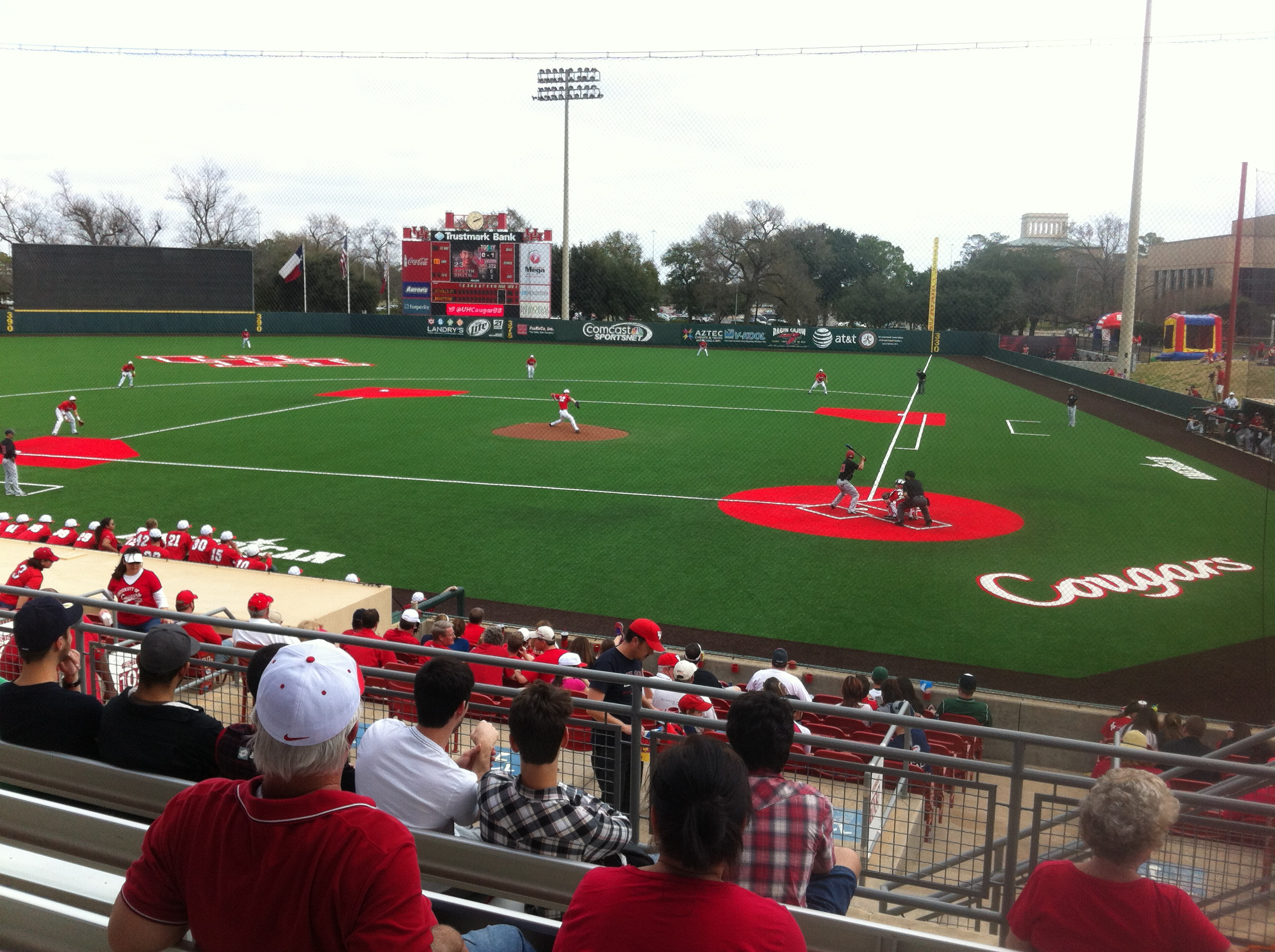
Cougar Field, the home of the Houston Cougars

| Tenure | Coach | Overall Record | Conference Record | Conference Regular Season Titles | Conference Tournament Titles | NCAA Tournament Appearances |
|---|---|---|---|---|---|---|
| 1947 | Ned Thompson | 1–5 (.167) | – | | | |
| 1948 | Dalton Albert | 4–7–1 (.375) | 2–6 (.250) | | | |
| 1949 | Bill Lutz | 7–9 (.438) | – | | | |
| 1950–1974 | Lovette Hill | 343–325–5 (.513) | 75–53 (.586) | 5 | 3 | 6 |
| 1975–1986 | Rolan Walton | 378–235–5 (.616) | 129–136–3 (.487) | | | 2 |
| 1987–1994 | Bragg Stockton | 283–183–4 (.606) | 68–106 (.391) | | | 2 |
| 1995–2010 | Rayner Noble | 551–420 (.567) | 259–162 (.615) | 3 | 3 | 8 |
| 2011–2026 | Todd Whitting | 498–394–1 (.558) | 177–198–1 (.472) | 3 | 2 | 4 |
| 2027–present | Will Davis | 0–0 (–) | 0–0 (–) | | | |
| Total | | 2,065–1,578–16 (.567) | | 11 | 8 | 22 |

Notes: Through 2026 season.

== NCAA Division I baseball tournament results ==
The Cougars have appeared in 22 NCAA tournaments. Their combined record is 43–48–1. They have made two appearances in the College World Series.

| Year | Round | Results |
|---|---|---|
| 1951 | District 5 Playoffs | Lost 2–5 at Oklahoma; Lost 5–6 at Oklahoma |
| 1953 | District 5 Playoffs | Lost 4–7 at Oklahoma; Won 8–7 at Oklahoma; Won 5–3 at Oklahoma |
| 1953 | College World Series | Lost 1–4 vs. Boston College; Lost 6–7 vs. Stanford |
| 1958 | District 6 Playoffs | Lost 2–3 vs. Texas |
| 1960 | District 6 Playoffs | Won 4–2 at Texas; Lost 3–4 at Arizona; Lost 4–6 at Arizona |
| 1966 | District 6 Playoffs | Tied 4–4 vs. Texas; Won 5–4 vs. Texas; Lost 3–9 vs. Texas; Lost 5–8 vs. Texas |
| 1967 | District 6 Playoffs | Won 11–8 vs. Texas; Lost 1–5 at Texas; Won 4–3 at Texas |
| 1967 | College World Series | Lost 1–12 vs. Stanford; Won 7–6 vs. Ohio State; Won 3–2^{13} vs. Boston College; Won 3–0 vs. Arizona State; Lost 2–11 vs. Arizona State |
| 1982 | West II Regional | Lost 3–7 vs. Cal State Fullerton; Won 13–3 vs. San Diego State; Lost 5–9 at Arizona State |
| 1985 | Central Regional | Won 11–4 vs. LSU; Lost 2–9 at Texas; Lost 9–10 vs. Lamar |
| 1987 | Central Regional | Won 10–5 vs. Indiana State; Won 8–4 vs. Sam Houston State; Lost 3–15 at Texas; Won 4–0 vs. Sam Houston State; Lost 4–13 at Texas |
| 1990 | South I Regional | Won 4–2 vs. Georgia Tech; Lost 11–26 vs. USC; Won 15–3 vs. Southern Miss; Lost 4–6 at LSU |
| 1997 | South I Regional | Lost 6–12 vs. South Alabama; Lost 5–9 vs. UNC Greensboro |
| 1999 | Houston Regional | Won 6–4 vs. Southwest Texas State; Lost 3–5 vs. Louisiana–Lafayette; Won 8–5 vs. Texas; Lost 8–19 vs. Louisiana–Lafayette |
| 2000 | Houston Regional | Won 7–6 vs. Princeton; Won 5–2 vs. Rice; Lost 4–5 vs. Rice; Won 9–5 vs. Rice |
| 2000 | Houston Super Regional | Lost 3–5 vs. San Jose State; Won 5–2 vs. San Jose State; Lost 2–3 vs. San Jose State |
| 2001 | Houston Regional | Lost 1–7 vs. Baylor; Lost 6–7 vs. Texas–Arlington |
| 2002 | Mesa Regional | Won 9–0 vs. New Mexico State; Won 8–4 at Arizona State; Won 8–3 at Arizona State |
| 2002 | Austin Super Regional | Won 2–0 at Texas; Lost 2–17 at Texas; Lost 2–5 at Texas |
| 2003 | College Station Regional | Lost 3–9 vs. Alabama; Won 4–2 vs. Oral Roberts; Won 16–8 vs. Alabama; Won 7–6 at Texas A&M; Won 7–6^{10} at Texas A&M |
| 2003 | Houston Super Regional | Won 5–2 at Rice; Lost 2–10 at Rice; Lost 2–5 at Rice |
| 2006 | Norman Regional | Lost 1–2 vs. Wichita State; Lost 6–8 at Oklahoma |
| 2008 | College Station Regional | Won 9–5 vs. Dallas Baptist; Lost 4–22 at Texas A&M; Won 14–11^{10} vs. UIC; Won 4–3 at Texas A&M; Lost 5–13 at Texas A&M |
| 2014 | Baton Rouge Regional | Won 3–2^{10} vs. Bryant; Lost 1–5 at LSU; Won 9–5 vs. Southeastern Louisiana; Won 5–4^{11} at LSU; Won 12–2 at LSU |
| 2014 | Austin Super Regional | Lost 2–4 at Texas; Lost 0–4 at Texas |
| 2015 | Houston Regional | Won 6–4 vs. Houston Baptist; Lost 1–2 vs. Louisiana–Lafayette; Lost 2–3^{20} vs. Rice |
| 2017 | Houston Regional | Lost 3–6 vs. Iowa; Won 17–3 vs. Baylor; Won 7–5 vs. Iowa; Lost 3–4 vs. Texas A&M |
| 2018 | Chapel Hill Regional | Won 9–1 vs. Purdue; Lost 3–4 at North Carolina; Won 8–4 vs. Purdue; Lost 11–19 at North Carolina |

== Rivalries ==
Each year, Houston competes in the Silver Glove series against Rice. They also play against Sam Houston State in what has been dubbed the Don Sanders Cup.

Other rivals include former Southwest Conference foes Baylor, TCU, Texas, Texas A&M, and Texas Tech.

== Individual awards ==
=== National Player award winners ===
ABCA National Player of the Year Award

- Brad Lincoln – 2006

Brooks Wallace Award

- Brad Lincoln – 2006

Dick Howser Trophy

- Brad Lincoln – 2006

=== First-team All-Americans ===
==== Key ====
| ^{‡} | Unanimous selection |
| ^{†} | Consensus selection |

| ABCA | American Baseball Coaches Association | D1B | D1Baseball.com |
| BA | Baseball America | NCBWA | National Collegiate Baseball Writers Association |
| CBF | College Baseball Foundation | PG | Perfect Game |
| CB | Collegiate Baseball Newspaper | | |

| Year | Player | Position | Selector(s) |
|---|---|---|---|
| 1967 | Tom Paciorek‡ | OF | ABCA |
| 1968 | Tom Paciorek‡ | OF | ABCA |
| 1976 | Jerry Willeford‡ | C | ABCA |
| 1983 | Rayner Noble† | UTL | ABCA |
| 2000 | Kyle Crowell | P | BA |
| 2002 | Jesse Crain | UTL | BA |
| 2002 | Brad Sullivan‡ | P | ABCA, BA, CB, NCBWA |
| 2003 | Ryan Wagner† | P | ABCA, BA, CB |
| 2006 | Brad Lincoln‡ | UTL | ABCA, BA, CB, NCBWA |
| 2017 | Trey Cumbie | P | NCBWA |
| 2025 | Antoine Jean | P | CBF, D1B, PG |

=== Conference Player of the Year ===
| Year | Player | Position | Conference |
|---|---|---|---|
| 1983 | Rayner Noble | UTL | Southwest |
| 1990† | Keith Darter | UTL | Southwest |
| 2017† | Jake Scheiner | INF | The American |

† co-Player of the Year

=== Conference Pitcher of the Year ===
| Year | Player | Conference |
|---|---|---|
| 1999 | Kyle Crowell | C-USA |
| 2000 | Kyle Crowell | C-USA |
| 2002 | Brad Sullivan | C-USA |
| 2006 | Brad Lincoln | C-USA |
| 2017† | Trey Cumbie | The American |
| 2018 | Aaron Fletcher | The American |
| 2025 | Antoine Jean | Big 12 |

† co-Pitcher of the Year

=== Conference Coach of the Year ===
| Year | Coach | Conference |
|---|---|---|
| 1976 | Rolan Walton | Southwest |
| 1982 | Rolan Walton | Southwest |
| 1999 | Rayner Noble | C-USA |
| 2000 | Rayner Noble | C-USA |
| 2018 | Todd Whitting | The American |

== Individual honors ==
=== National College Baseball Hall of Fame inductees ===
The following Houston players and coaches have been enshrined in the National College Baseball Hall of Fame.

| Year Inducted | Name | Position | Tenure | Ref. |
|---|---|---|---|---|
| 2016 | Tom Paciorek | OF | 1966–1968 | |

=== Retired numbers ===
The Cougars have retired three numbers.

| No. | Player | Position | Tenure |
|---|---|---|---|
| 6 | Rolan Walton | SS | 1948–1951 |
| 16 | Doug Drabek | P | 1981–1983 |
| 22 | Tom Paciorek | OF | 1966–1968 |

== See also ==
- List of NCAA Division I baseball programs
