= 2009 Conference USA baseball tournament =

2009 C-USA Baseball, USA

- Teams: 8
- Format: Eight-team double-elimination tournament
- Finals site: Pete Taylor Park; Hattiesburg, Mississippi
- Champions: Rice (3rd title)
- Winning coach: Wayne Graham (3rd title)
- MVP: Anthony Rendon (Rice)

2009 Conference USA baseball standings
	Conf.				Overall
Team	W		L	PCT	W		L	PCT
No. 16 East Carolina ‍†‍‍^{y}	17	–	7	.708	46	–	20	.697
No. 11 Rice ‍‍‡‍^{y}	16	–	8	.667	43	–	18	.705
Houston ‍‍‍	13	–	11	.542	27	–	30	.474
Tulane ‍‍‍	13	–	11	.542	34	–	24	.586
No. 8 Southern Miss ‍‍‍^{y}	12	–	12	.500	40	–	26	.606
UAB ‍‍‍	11	–	12	.478	31	–	26	.544
Marshall ‍‍‍	9	–	15	.375	22	–	32	.407
UCF ‍‍‍	9	–	15	.375	22	–	35	.386
Memphis ‍‍‍	7	–	16	.304	21	–	32	.396
† – Conference champion ‡ – Tournament champion y – Invited to the NCAA tournament As of June 30, 2009; Rankings from Collegiate Baseball

The 2009 Conference USA baseball tournament was the 2009 postseason college baseball championship of the NCAA Division I Conference USA, held at Pete Taylor Park in Hattiesburg, Mississippi, from May 20–May 24, 2009. Rice won their third C-USA tournament, and received Conference USA's automatic bid to the 2009 NCAA Division I baseball tournament. The tournament consisted of eight teams, with two double-elimination brackets, and a single-game final.

== Regular season results ==
Team	W	L	T	Pct	GB	Seed
East Carolina	17	7	0	.708	--	1
Rice	16	8	0	.667	1	2
Houston	13	11	0	.542	4	3
Tulane	13	11	0	.542	4	4
Southern Miss	12	12	0	.500	5	5
UAB	11	12	0	.468	5.5	6
Marshall	9	15	0	.375	8	7
UCF	9	15	0	.375	8	8
Memphis	7	16	0	.304	9.5	--

- SMU, Tulsa, and UTEP did not field baseball teams. Memphis did not make the tournament.

== Bracket ==
First round May 20–21	Second round May 21–22
6	**UAB**	**8**
3	Houston	3
6	UAB	1
2	**Rice**	**8**
7	Marshall	0
2	**Rice**	**13**
Bracket One
7	Marshall	1
3	**Houston**	**4**	6	UAB	1
3	**Houston**	**4**
8	UCF	3
1	**East Carolina**	**6**
5	**Southern Miss**	**5**
1	East Carolina	2
5	**Southern Miss**	**15**
4	Tulane	2
Bracket Two
8	UCF	3
4	**Tulane**	7	4	**Tulane**	**3**
1	East Carolina	0

Semi-finals; May 22–23
3	Houston	2
2	**Rice**	**7**
5	**Southern Miss**	**3**
4	Tulane	1

Finals; May 24
5	Southern Miss	6
2	**Rice**	**8**

- **Bold** indicates the winner of the game.
- Italics indicate that the team was eliminated from the tournament.

== Finish order ==
Finish	Team	W	L	T	Pct	Seed	Eliminated By
1	Rice^{†}	4	0	0	1.000	2	
2	Southern Miss^{#}	3	1	0	.750	5	Rice
3	Tulane	2	2	0	.500	4	Southern Miss
4	Houston	2	2	0	.500	3	Rice
5	East Carolina^{#}	1	2	0	.333	1	Tulane
6	UAB	1	2	0	.333	6	Houston
7	UCF	0	2	0	.000	8	Tulane
8	Marshall	0	2	0	.000	7	Houston
^{†} - Winner of the tournament and received an automatic bid to the NCAA tournament.^{#} - Received an at-large bid to the NCAA tournament.

== All-tournament team ==
Position	Player	School
C	Siego Seastrunk	Rice
IF	James Ewing	Southern Mississippi
IF	Rick Hague	Rice
IF	Josh Prince	Tulane
IF	Anthony Rendon	Rice
OF	Nick Boullosa	Tulane
OF	Steven Sultzbaugh	Rice
OF	Trent Whitehead	East Carolina
DH	Corey Stevens	Southern Mississippi
P	JR Ballinger	Southern Mississippi
P	Ryan Berry	Rice
P	Todd McInnis	Southern Mississippi
P	Taylor Wall	Rice
**MVP**	Anthony Rendon	Rice
