= 2003 Conference USA baseball tournament =

- Teams: 8
- Format: Eight-team double-elimination tournament
- Finals site: Turchin Stadium; New Orleans, Louisiana
- Champions: Southern Miss (1st title)
- Winning coach: Corky Palmer (1st title)
- MVP: Clint King (Southern Miss)

The 2003 Conference USA baseball tournament was the 2003 postseason baseball championship of the NCAA Division I Conference USA, held at Turchin Stadium in New Orleans, Louisiana, from May 21 through 25. Southern Miss defeated Tulane in the championship game, earning the conference's automatic bid to the 2003 NCAA Division I baseball tournament.

== Regular season results ==
Team	W	L	PCT	GB	Seed
Southern Miss	23	7	.767	-	1
TCU	22	8	.733	1	2
Tulane	20	10	.667	3	3
Houston	18	12	.600	5	4
East Carolina	17	13	.567	6	5
South Florida	14	14	.500	8	6
Louisville	14	15	.483	8.5	7
Charlotte	11	15	.423	10	8
UAB	12	17	.414	10.5	--
Memphis	11	18	.379	11.5	--
Cincinnati	7	22	.241	15.5	--
Saint Louis	6	24	.200	17	--

- Records reflect conference play only.

== Bracket ==
First round
5	East Carolina	1
**4**	**Houston**	**2**
8	Charlotte	0
**1**	**Southern Miss**	**13**
8	Charlotte	5
**5**	**East Carolina**	**8**
**7**	**Louisville**	**5**
2	TCU	1
6	South Florida	3
**3**	**Tulane**	**4**
**6**	**South Florida**	**10**
2	TCU	6

Second round
4	Houston	2
**1**	**Southern Miss**	**7**
**5**	**East Carolina**	**5**
4	Houston	0
7	Louisville	1
**3**	**Tulane**	**3**
**7**	**Louisville**	**11**
6	South Florida	4

Semifinals
5	East Carolina	1
**1**	**Southern Miss**	**3**
7	Louisville	3
**3**	**Tulane**	**5**

Final
3	Tulane	5
**1**	**Southern Miss**	**7**

- **Bold** indicates the winner of the game.
- Italics indicate that the team was eliminated from the tournament.

== All-tournament team ==
Position	Player	School
C	Brian Bormaster	Tulane
IF	Darryl Lawhorn	East Carolina
IF	J.T. LaFountain	Tulane
IF	Beau Griffin	Southern Miss
IF	Tommy Manzella	Tulane
OF	Jeff Cook	Southern Miss
OF	Clint King	Southern Miss
OF	Jason Lowery	Southern Miss
DH	Allen Shirley	South Florida
P	Jason Tourangeau	East Carolina
P	Billy Mohl	Tulane
**MVP**	Clint King	Southern Miss
