= Corky Palmer =

American baseball coach (1954–2022)

Biographical details
- Born: March 14, 1954; Hattiesburg, Mississippi, U.S.
- Died: August 10, 2022 (aged 68); Collins, Mississippi, U.S.

Playing career
- 1974–1977: Southern Miss

Coaching career (HC unless noted)
- 1987–1996: Meridian Community College
- 1998–2009: Southern Miss

Head coaching record
- Overall: 409–160 (Meridian); 458–281 (Southern Miss)

Accomplishments and honors

Awards
- Conference USA Baseball Coach of the Year (2003)

Carlton Devan "Corky" Palmer (March 14, 1954 – August 10, 2022) was an American college baseball coach. He was head coach at Meridian Community College before serving as the head coach of the Southern Miss Golden Eagles baseball team for 12 seasons, retiring at the end of the 2009 season. In his final season, he brought the Golden Eagles to the College World Series, USM's first appearance there.

== Early life ==
Palmer was born in Hattiesburg, Mississippi, on March 15, 1954. He attended Hattiesburg High School in his hometown, graduating in 1972. He played catcher for its baseball team from 1970 to 1972 and earned three varsity letters in the sport. He then studied coaching and athletic administration at the University of Southern Mississippi, where he played for the Southern Miss Golden Eagles from 1974 to 1977. During his time with the team, Palmer recorded a .274 batting average, lettered in all four seasons, and served as captain during his senior year. He later gained a master's degree in education from William Carey University.

== Coaching career ==
After graduating, Palmer first worked as an assistant coach at Newton High School from 1978 to 1979. He subsequently became head coach of Lee High School in Columbus, Mississippi. Under his leadership, the school won three straight Little 10 Conference titles from 1980 to 1982 and shared a district title in 1980. Palmer then worked as head coach of Columbia High School, leading the school to a 102–52 record and winning the Mississippi High School Activities Association (MHSAA) South State championship in 1983.

Upon leaving Columbia after the 1984 season, Palmer went back to the Golden Eagles as an assistant coach in pitching. During his two years in that capacity, one pitcher was honored as an All-Metro Conference, while another was selected to the all-Metro tournament. The 1986 team posted a 31–30 record—the first of 36 winning seasons over the next 37 years for the school. Palmer went on to serve as head coach of Meridian Community College from 1987 to 1996. The school advanced to the JUCO World Series in 1993, 1994, and 1996, finishing runner-up in 1996 having achieved third-place two years before. It also won five Miss-Lou Conference titles, in addition to making three appearances in the NJCAA Region 23 tournament. For his part, Palmer was named Region 23 Coach of the Year in 1992–1994 and 1996. He finished with a 409–160 record at Meridian.

Palmer returned to the Golden Eagles for a third stint in 1997, having been convinced by coach Hill Denson go back as an assistant coach. Upon Denson's retirement at the end of the season, Palmer was appointed head coach of the Golden Eagles. He led the school to the regular season and tournament titles of the 2003 Conference USA baseball tournament, in addition to eight appearances in the NCAA tournament (including seven consecutive from 2003 to 2009). He was honored as Conference USA Coach of the Year in 2003. Palmer revealed on May 1, 2009, that he was retiring as head coach at the end of the season. The Golden Eagles, who were having a mediocre season up until that point, improved its performance and eventually reached its first College World Series. It was the school's only appearance in the College World Series at the time of Palmer's death in 2022.

Palmer finished his Golden Eagles coaching tenure with a 458–281 record. His 458 wins with the school were the third most at the time of his death. He was inducted into the Mississippi Sports Hall of Fame in 2011. Eight years later, he was part of the second class inducted into the Hattiesburg Hall of Fame.

== Personal life ==
Palmer was married to Deborah Bonnett Palmer until his death. They met while studying at the University of Southern Mississippi together. They resided in Hattiesburg during his later years, and were members of Providence Baptist Church. They did not have children.

Palmer died on the afternoon of August 10, 2022, at a nursing home in Collins, Mississippi. He was 68, and was recovering from a major stroke that occurred after neck surgery exactly two years prior to his death.
