= 2010 Conference USA baseball tournament =

- Teams: 6
- Format: Two groups of round robin followed by a championship game
- Finals site: Cougar Field; Houston, Texas
- Champions: Southern Mississippi (2nd title)
- Winning coach: Scott Berry (1st title)
- MVP: Scott Copeland (Southern Mississippi)

2010 Conference USA baseball standings
| | Conf. | | | | Overall |
| Team | W | | L | PCT | W | | L | PCT |
|---|---|---|---|---|---|---|---|---|
| No. 26 Rice ‍†‍‍ | 17 | – | 7 | .708 | 40 | – | 23 | .635 |
| Southern Miss ‍‍‡‍ | 14 | – | 10 | .583 | 36 | – | 24 | .600 |
| Memphis ‍‍‍ | 12 | – | 12 | .500 | 28 | – | 30 | .483 |
| Marshall ‍‍‍ | 12 | – | 12 | .500 | 27 | – | 31 | .466 |
| Houston ‍‍‍ | 11 | – | 13 | .458 | 25 | – | 32 | .439 |
| East Carolina ‍‍‍ | 11 | – | 13 | .458 | 32 | – | 27 | .542 |
| UAB ‍‍‍ | 11 | – | 13 | .458 | 28 | – | 25 | .528 |
| UCF ‍‍‍ | 10 | – | 14 | .417 | 33 | – | 22 | .600 |
| Tulane ‍‍‍ | 10 | – | 14 | .417 | 32 | – | 24 | .571 |
† – Conference champion ‡ – Tournament champion y – Invited to the 2010 NCAA Division I baseball tournament As of June 30, 2010; Rankings from Collegiate Baseball

The 2010 Conference USA baseball tournament was the 2010 postseason college baseball championship of the NCAA Division I Conference USA, held at Cougar Field in Houston, Texas, from May 26–May 30, 2010. Southern Miss won the tournament and received Conference USA's automatic bid to the 2010 NCAA Division I baseball tournament.

The tournament format changed from that which had been used since the 2000 tournament. It consisted of six teams split into two three-team pods. Each team played a total of three preliminary games, two against its podmates and one against a team from the opposite pod. The team with the best record in each pod going advanced to a single-game final.

== Regular season results ==
| Team | W | L | Pct | GB | Seed |
|---|---|---|---|---|---|
| Rice | 17 | 7 | .708 | -- | 1 |
| Southern Miss | 14 | 10 | .583 | 3 | 2 |
| Memphis | 12 | 12 | .500 | 5 | 3 |
| Marshall | 12 | 12 | .500 | 5 | 4 |
| Houston | 11 | 13 | .458 | 6 | 5 |
| East Carolina | 11 | 13 | .458 | 6 | 6 |
| UAB | 11 | 13 | .458 | 6 | -- |
| UCF | 10 | 14 | .417 | 7 | -- |
| Tulane | 10 | 14 | .417 | 7 | -- |

- SMU, Tulsa, and UTEP do not field baseball teams. Tulane, UAB, and UCF did not make the tournament.

== Bracket ==
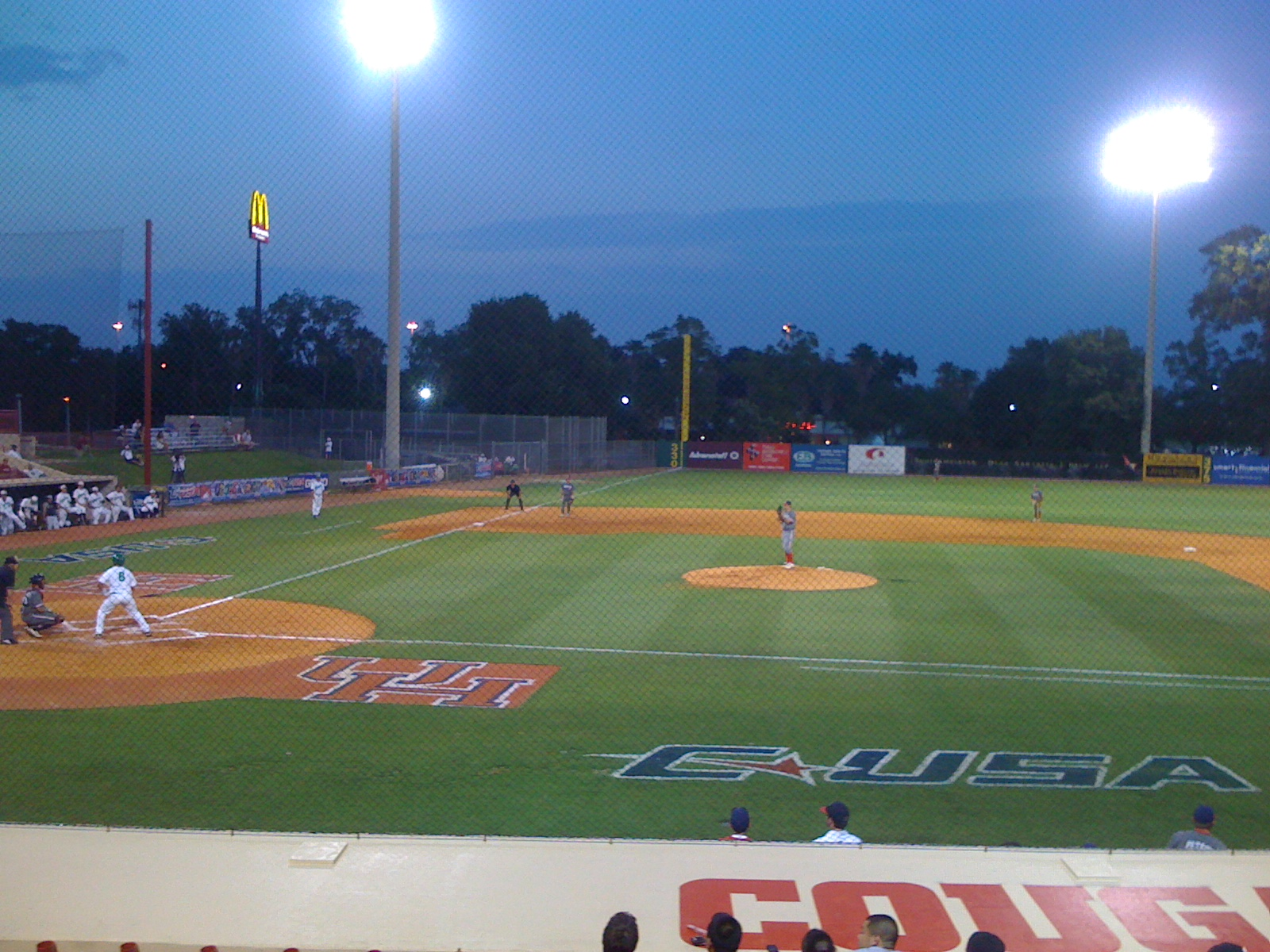
Houston vs. Marshall in the 2010 C-USA baseball tournament

Pod 1

| Pos | Team | Pld | W | L | RF | RA | RD | PCT | Qualification |
|---|---|---|---|---|---|---|---|---|---|
| 1 | Rice | 3 | 3 | 0 | 53 | 6 | +47 | 1.000 | Advance to Finals |
| 2 | Marshall | 3 | 1 | 2 | 17 | 36 | −19 | .333 | |
| 3 | Houston | 3 | 1 | 2 | 20 | 41 | −21 | .333 | |

Pod 2

| Pos | Team | Pld | W | L | RF | RA | RD | PCT | Qualification |
|---|---|---|---|---|---|---|---|---|---|
| 1 | Southern Miss | 3 | 2 | 1 | 19 | 16 | +3 | .667 | Advance to Finals |
| 2 | Memphis | 3 | 1 | 2 | 12 | 20 | −8 | .333 | |
| 3 | East Carolina | 3 | 1 | 2 | 13 | 15 | −2 | .333 | |

| Finals |
| Rice | 4 |
| Southern Miss | 7 |

== Results ==
| Game | Winning team | Score | Losing team |
|---|---|---|---|
| 1 | Southern Miss | 8–2 | Memphis |
| 2 | Rice | 11–3 | East Carolina |
| 3 | Houston | 11–7 | Marshall |
| 4 | East Carolina | 8–1 | Southern Miss |
| 5 | Marshall | 10–7 | Memphis |
| 6 | Rice | 24–3 | Houston |
| 7 | Memphis | 3–2 | East Carolina |
| 8 | Rice | 18–0 | Marshall |
| 9 | Southern Miss | 10–6 | Houston |
| 10 | Southern Miss | 7–4 | Rice |

== Finish order ==
| Finish | Team | W | L | Pct | Seed | RS | RA | Diff |
|---|---|---|---|---|---|---|---|---|
| 1 | ^{†}Southern Miss | 3 | 1 | 0.750 | 2 | 26 | 20 | 6 |
| 2 | ^{#}Rice | 3 | 1 | 0.750 | 1 | 57 | 13 | 44 |
| 3 | East Carolina | 1 | 2 | 0.333 | 6 | 13 | 15 | -2 |
| 4 | Memphis | 1 | 2 | 0.333 | 3 | 12 | 20 | -8 |
| 5 | Marshall | 1 | 2 | 0.333 | 4 | 17 | 36 | -19 |
| 6 | Houston | 1 | 2 | 0.333 | 5 | 20 | 41 | -21 |

^{†} - Winner of the tournament and received an automatic bid to the NCAA tournament.
^{#} - Received an at-large bid to the NCAA tournament.

== All-Tournament Team ==
| Position | Player | School |
|---|---|---|
| C | Diego Seastrunk | Rice |
| IF | Rick Hague | Rice |
| IF | Anthony Rendon | Rice |
| IF | B.A. Vollmuth | Southern Miss |
| IF | Taylor Walker | Southern Miss |
| OF | Michael Fuda | Rice |
| OF | Chad Mozingo | Rice |
| OF | Steven Sultzbaugh | Rice |
| DH | M.P. Cokinos | Houston |
| P | Scott Copeland | Southern Miss |
| P | Seth Maness | East Carolina |
| P | Brennon Martin | Memphis |
| P | Jared Rogers | Rice |
| MVP | Scott Copeland | Southern Miss |

(*)Denotes Unanimous Selection
