= Daron Schoenrock =

American baseball coach and pitcher (born 1961)

Current position
- Title: Pitching coach
- Team: Auburn
- Conference: SEC

Biographical details
- Born: November 21, 1961 (age 64); Cedar Rapids, Iowa, U.S.
- Education: Tennessee Tech '84

Playing career
- 1981–1984: Tennessee Tech
- Position: Pitcher

Coaching career (HC unless noted)
- 1985: Tennessee Tech (asst.)
- 1986–1987: Murray State (asst.)
- 1988–1989: Lincoln Memorial
- 1990–1997: Birmingham–Southern (asst.)
- 1998–1999: Kentucky (asst.)
- 2000–2001: Georgia (asst.)
- 2002–2004: Mississippi State (asst.)
- 2005–2022: Memphis
- 2023: Auburn (asst.)

Head coaching record
- Overall: 488–585
- Tournaments: American: 9–13; C-USA: 11–11; NCAA: 0–2

Accomplishments and honors

Awards
- C-USA Coach of the Year (2013)

Daron Schoenrock (born November 21, 1961) is an American baseball coach and former pitcher. He played college baseball for the Tennessee Tech Golden Eagles from 1981 to 1984. He then served as the head coach of the Lincoln Memorial Railsplitters (1988–1989) and the Memphis Tigers (2005–2022).

== Playing career ==
Schoenrock was a pitcher at Tennessee Tech, starting games in all four years before earning his degree in 1984.

== Coaching career ==
After completing his studies at Tennessee Tech, Schoenrock became a graduate assistant coach for one season at his alma mater. He then moved to Murray State where he completed a master's and served as an assistant for two seasons. Schoenrock then earned his first head coaching position at Division II Lincoln Memorial. He coached for two seasons with the Railsplitters, leading the team to their first postseason appearance in five years and earning conference coach of the year honors in 1989. During that season, Lincoln Memorial played all of their games on the road due to work on their home stadium.

Following his stint with LMU, Schoenrock became a pitching coach at Birmingham–Southern, then an NAIA school. In his eight seasons with the Panthers, he became a highly regarded pitching coach, authoring a book on all aspects of pitching, helping the Panthers reach the NAIA College World Series, and earning a summer posting as a short-season pitching coach in the Chicago White Sox organization in 1995. He then began a series of short stints as a pitching coach at Southeastern Conference schools, working two years at Kentucky, two years at Georgia and three years at Mississippi State. During this time, he coached a series of pro prospects, including Brandon Webb, Jonathan Papelbon, and Paul Maholm.

Schoenrock was named head coach of the Memphis Tigers before the 2005 season. After a rough first year, he led the Tigers to 32 wins in his second season, marking the second best improvement in wins in the nation that year. The Tigers appeared in the 2007 NCAA tournament and frequently advance to the Conference USA baseball tournament under Schoenrock. The team has also performed well in the classroom, posting GPA's well over 3.2 as a team. These successes, as well as strong recruiting, have led to a contract extension for Schoenrock and helped build excitement for the Tigers' entry to the Big East Conference.

Schoenrock was named pitching coach for the Auburn Tigers on August 1, 2022.

In January 2025, Schoenrock was inducted into the Tennessee Baseball Coaches Association Hall of Fame.

Schoenrock is currently the Assistant District Athletic Director of Collierville (TN) Schools District.

== Head coaching record ==
Below is a table of Schoenrock's yearly records as an NCAA head baseball coach.

Record table
Season	Team	Overall	Conference	Standing	Postseason
Lincoln Memorial Railsplitters (Tennessee Valley Athletic Conference) (1988–1989)
1988	Lincoln Memorial	12–26			
1989	Lincoln Memorial	13–26			TVAC Tournament
Lincoln Memorial:		25–52			
Memphis Tigers (Conference USA) (2005–2013)
2005	Memphis	13–42	5–25	12th	
2006	Memphis	32–28	13–11	t-4th	C-USA tournament
2007	Memphis	36–27	12–12	t-5th	NCAA Regional
2008	Memphis	17–38	5–18	9th	
2009	Memphis	21–32	7–16	9th	
2010	Memphis	28–30	12–12	t-3rd	C-USA tournament
2011	Memphis	30–27	12–12	t-4th	C-USA tournament
2012	Memphis	31–28	14–10	t-3rd	C-USA tournament
2013	Memphis	35–24	14–10	t-3rd	C-USA tournament
Memphis:			94-126		
Memphis Tigers (American Athletic Conference) (2014–2022)
2014	Memphis	30–29	8–16	8th	The American tournament
2015	Memphis	37–21	12–12	5th	The American tournament (Note: In this season, all members of the American Athletic Conference qualified for the postseason tournament.)
2016	Memphis	22–39	9–15	6th	The American tournament
2017	Memphis	30–29	8–16	7th	The American tournament
2018	Memphis	20–36	5–19	9th	
2019	Memphis	27–28	10–13	7th	The American tournament
2020	Memphis	10–7	0–0		Season canceled due to COVID-19
2021	Memphis	18–39	7–25	8th	The American tournament
2022	Memphis	26–29	9–15	T-6th	American tournament
Memphis:		463–533	68–131		
Total:		488–585			
National champion Postseason invitational champion Conference regular season champion Conference regular season and conference tournament champion Division regular season champion Division regular season and conference tournament champion Conference tournament champion

== Personal ==
Daron is the husband of the former Carol Cawood. They have been married since August 6, 1988. They have two sons: Erik and Bret. Erik was selected by the San Diego Padres in the 11th round in the 2013 MLB First Year Player Draft after being named the 2013 Conference USA Pitcher of the Year.
