= Stan Bronson Jr. =

American batboy (1928–2018)

- Born: July 19, 1928; Memphis, Tennessee, U.S.
- Died: January 9, 2018 (aged 89); Memphis, Tennessee, U.S.
- Years active: 1958–2014
- Known for: Batboy at the University of Memphis
- Awards: "Most Durable Batboy" per Guinness World Records

Stan Bronson Jr. (July 19, 1928 – January 9, 2018) was an American special needs individual, notable for serving as a batboy for the Memphis Tigers baseball team for over 50 years. He was added to the 2008 edition of Guinness World Records as "Most Durable Batboy".

== Biography ==
Bronson came to the University of Memphis (then Memphis State University) in 1958 when he asked head football coach Billy "Spook" Murphy for a job with the Tigers football team. Bronson's first job with Memphis was picking up footballs whenever the kickers would practice on the sidelines. He worked in the capacity as an equipment manager for the football team until he was in his 60s.

Bronson also served as a batboy for the Tigers baseball team beginning in 1958, and continuing on a regular basis through 2014. When a Tiger home game reached the seventh-inning stretch, Bronson made his way to home plate where he acknowledged, with a tip of his cap, the "Tiger faithful" at the game.

On April 25, 2010, Bronson's jersey (no. 47) was retired and displayed on the right field wall of FedExPark, joining the retired numbers of other Tiger notables.

Bronson died on January 9, 2018, at the age of 89.
