= Eddie Bennett =

American batboy (1903–1935)

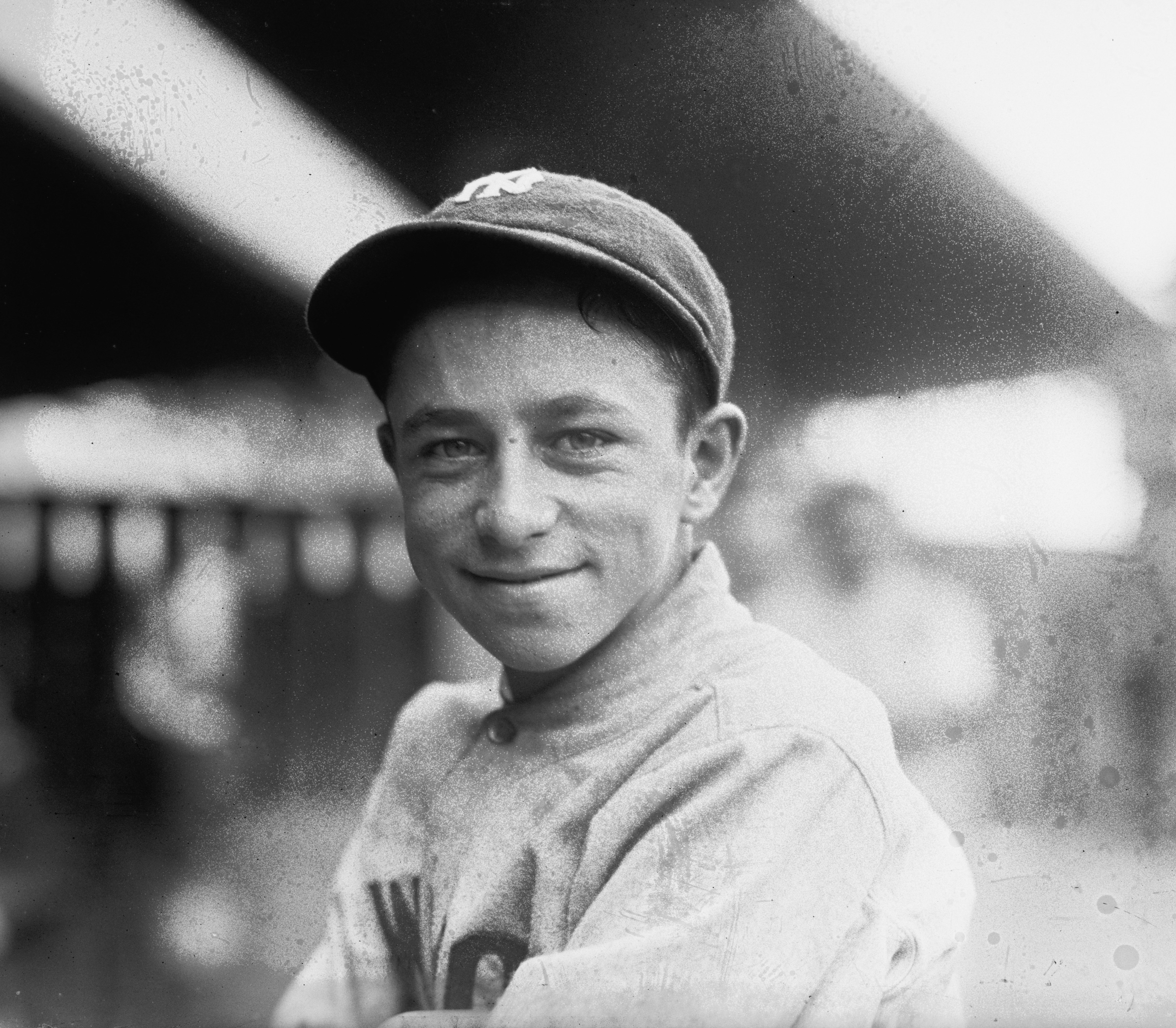
- Bennett with the Yankees, circa 1921
- Born: November 19, 1903; Brooklyn, New York City, U.S.
- Died: January 16, 1935 (aged 31); Manhattan, New York City, U.S.
- Resting place: St. John Cemetery, Queens, New York City, U.S.
- Occupations: Batboy, Yankees' Mascot
- Writing career
- Years active: 1918–1933

Eddie Bennett (November 19, 1903 – January 16, 1935) was an American batboy for the Chicago White Sox (1919), Brooklyn Robins (1920), and most notably for the New York Yankees (1921–1932) where he was also served as the team's mascot.

During his career as a batboy, Bennett saw his teams capture nine pennants and four World Series titles. Considered by many to bring good fortune, Bennett was deemed integral to the rituals of players on the team, developing a particularly close friendships with Babe Ruth, Urban Shocker, and Miller Huggins. Bennett served as mascot and batboy until 1933, being forced to retire after sustaining injuries from being struck by an automobile. Two years later, Bennett died of alcoholism in 1935.

Despite being regularly featured in new publications and considered, the "most famous mascot in the world" at the time of his death, Bennett largely drifted into obscurity for the next hundred years from the start of his career. At the turn of the 21st century Bennett's career received renewed interest and study where some have lauded his contributions to his team and baseball.

== Early life ==
Bennett was born in Flatbush, Brooklyn. When Bennett was very young, he received a spine injury suffered in a baby carriage incident. That injury left Bennett with a hunchbacked back and restricted his growth; by the time he was an adult he was considered a dwarf. Bennett's parents died in the 1918 flu epidemic, and Bennett, needing a job, convinced Chicago White Sox outfielder Happy Felsch that he had "mystical powers" that could bring good luck to everyone that used him. He became Felsch's personal mascot and when Felsch's play improved, he moved on to become the White Sox personal mascot in 1919. The club won the pennant that year with Bennett sitting on the bench with the players. During the 1919 World Series, eight members of the White Sox, including Felsch, decided to throw the World Series. A scandal erupted which later led those eight players receiving lifetime bans from baseball and Bennett left the team to join his hometown Brooklyn Robins. The Robins won the pennant in 1920, but after participating in the first three World Series games – both the second and third being Robins victories – Bennett wasn't invited to join the team at Cleveland. The Robins went on to lose their next four games, and the series, to the Indians. He soon left the team, citing "lack of trust".

== New York Yankees ==
At the age of 18 Bennett became the bat boy for the New York Yankees on the request of Yankees owner Jacob Ruppert. He was considered to be a "good luck charm" by the members of the club, and became a well-known celebrity in New York. Each year, he went down to Florida to join the Yankees spring training. He became one of Babe Ruth's closest friends on the team, and they played catch on the field nearly every game. A close confidant of manager Miller Huggins, Bennett usually sat next to Huggins during Yankees games, pointing out issues he noticed on the field, a predecessor of a bench coach in today's baseball. By 1927 he was working out of the front office organizing transportation for the team and coordinating luggage transfers during road trips, duties now associated with a travel secretary. As a member of the storied Murderers’ Row Bennett wore tailored suits and bright colored ties, befitting his status as the Yankees’ Luckiest Batboy.

== Decline and death ==
On May 19, 1932 Bennett was hit by a taxi on a New York City street. He suffered a broken leg and other injuries from which he never recovered. To find relief from the pain he suffered from the injuries, Bennett started to abuse alcohol. He was forced to retire as the Yankees mascot in the middle of 1933 season, although Ruppert insisted he remain on the payroll all year. The New York Times reported that the "notoriously superstitious" ballplayers and fans blamed Bennett's absence on the Yankees' failure to win the pennant in 1933 and 1934.

In January 1935 Bennett died penniless in his room at a lodging house at 115 W. 84th Street in Manhattan, age 31. The coroner ruled the cause of death as alcoholism; according to his landlady, Bennett had told her that drinking was the only relief from his chronic pain. He had no known relatives and had been scheduled to be buried in a pauper's grave until Ruppert paid for his funeral and burial. Ruppert and general manager Ed Barrow were not able to attend the service but sent flowers. The entire Yankee front office staff of Paul Krichell, Gene McCann, Mark Roth, George Perry, and Charlie McManus accompanied Bennett's body from the funeral parlor to St. Gregory the Great Church for the service and on to St. John's Cemetery in Queens for burial. No player attended the service, perhaps because they were scattered during the off-season.

In 2020 a monument company donated a stone for his grave, which had been unmarked at St. John Cemetery in Middle Village, Queens. The Cemetery's Chaplain presided over its installation. It read: “Edward Bennett, 1903–1935. New York Yankees Mascot/Batboy, 1921–1932.”

== Legacy ==
Bennett's life was mentioned by billionaire Warren Buffett during his annual stockholder report in 2002, saying that Bennett was a key role model during Buffett's career in investing, naming him a "winner at every costs".
