= Metro Conference (1975–1995) baseball tournament =

Metro Conference baseball tournament
- Conference baseball championship
- Sport: Baseball
- Conference: Metro Conference
- Played: 1976–1995
- Most championships: Florida State (11)

Host stadiums
- Tom and Lib Phillips Field (1995); Parkway Field (1994); The Diamond (1993); Turchin Stadium (1992); Kiwanis Field (1991); Pete Taylor Park (1990; Sarge Frye Field (1987, 1989); Seminole Stadium (1983–86, 1988); Nat Buring Stadium (1976–77)

Host locations
- Charlotte, NC (1995); Louisville, KY (1994); Richmond, VA (1993); New Orleans, LA (1992); Salem, VA (1991); Hattiesburg, MS (1990); Columbia, SC (1987, 1989); Tallahassee, FL (1978–86, 1988); Memphis, TN (1976–77)

The Metro Conference baseball tournament was the conference baseball championship of the NCAA Division I Metro Conference from 1976 through 1995. The winner of the tournament received an automatic berth to the NCAA Division I Baseball Championship.

== Champions ==
=== By year ===
The following is a list of conference champions and sites listed by year.

Year	Program	Site	MOP
1976	Memphis State	Nat Buring Stadium • Memphis, TN	Ron McNeely, Memphis State
1977	Florida State	Nat Buring Stadium • Memphis, TN	Terry Kennedy, Florida State
1978	Memphis State	Seminole Field • Tallahassee, FL	Terry Pressgrove, Memphis State
1979	Tulane	Seminole Field • Tallahassee, FL	Ken Francingues, Tulane
1980	Florida State	Seminole Field • Tallahassee, FL	Mike Fuentes, Florida State
1981	Florida State	Seminole Field • Tallahassee, FL	Mike Fuentes, Florida State
1982	Tulane	Seminole Field • Tallahassee, FL	Eric Lane, Tulane
1983	Florida State	Seminole Stadium • Tallahassee, FL	Danny Dowell, Florida State
1984	Florida State	Seminole Stadium • Tallahassee, FL	Jody Reed, Florida State
1985	Florida State	Seminole Stadium • Tallahassee, FL	Richie Lewis, Florida State
1986	Florida State	Seminole Stadium • Tallahassee, FL	Mike Loynd, Florida State
1987	Florida State	Sarge Frye Field • Columbia, SC	Ed Porcelli, Florida State
1988	Florida State	Seminole Stadium • Tallahassee, FL	Edwin Alicea, Florida State
1989	Florida State	Sarge Frye Field • Columbia, SC	Sedgwick McCollum, Southern Miss
1990	Florida State	Pete Taylor Park • Hattiesburg, MS	Allen Bevis, Florida State
1991†	Southern Miss/Florida State	Kiwanis Field • Salem, VA	Ty Mueller, Florida State
1992	Tulane	Turchin Stadium • New Orleans, LA	
1993	Charlotte	The Diamond • Richmond, VA	
1994	Virginia Tech	Parkway Field • Louisville, KY	
1995	South Florida	Tom and Lib Phillips Field • Charlotte, NC	

† - Due to rain on the day of the title game, Florida State and Southern Miss were named co-champions in 1991.

=== By school ===
The following is a list of conference champions listed by school.

Program	No. of titles	Title years
Florida State	12	1977, 1980, 1981, 1983, 1984, 1985, 1986, 1987, 1988, 1989, 1990, 1991†
Tulane	3	1979, 1982, 1992
Memphis (Memphis State)	2	1976, 1978
Charlotte	1	1993
South Florida	1	1995
Southern Miss	1	1991†
Virginia Tech	1	1994

† - Due to rain on the day of the title game, Florida State and Southern Miss were named co-champions in 1991.
