= Pete Taylor Park =

Baseball stadium in Mississippi, U.S.

Pete Taylor Park/Hill Denson Field
- The Pete
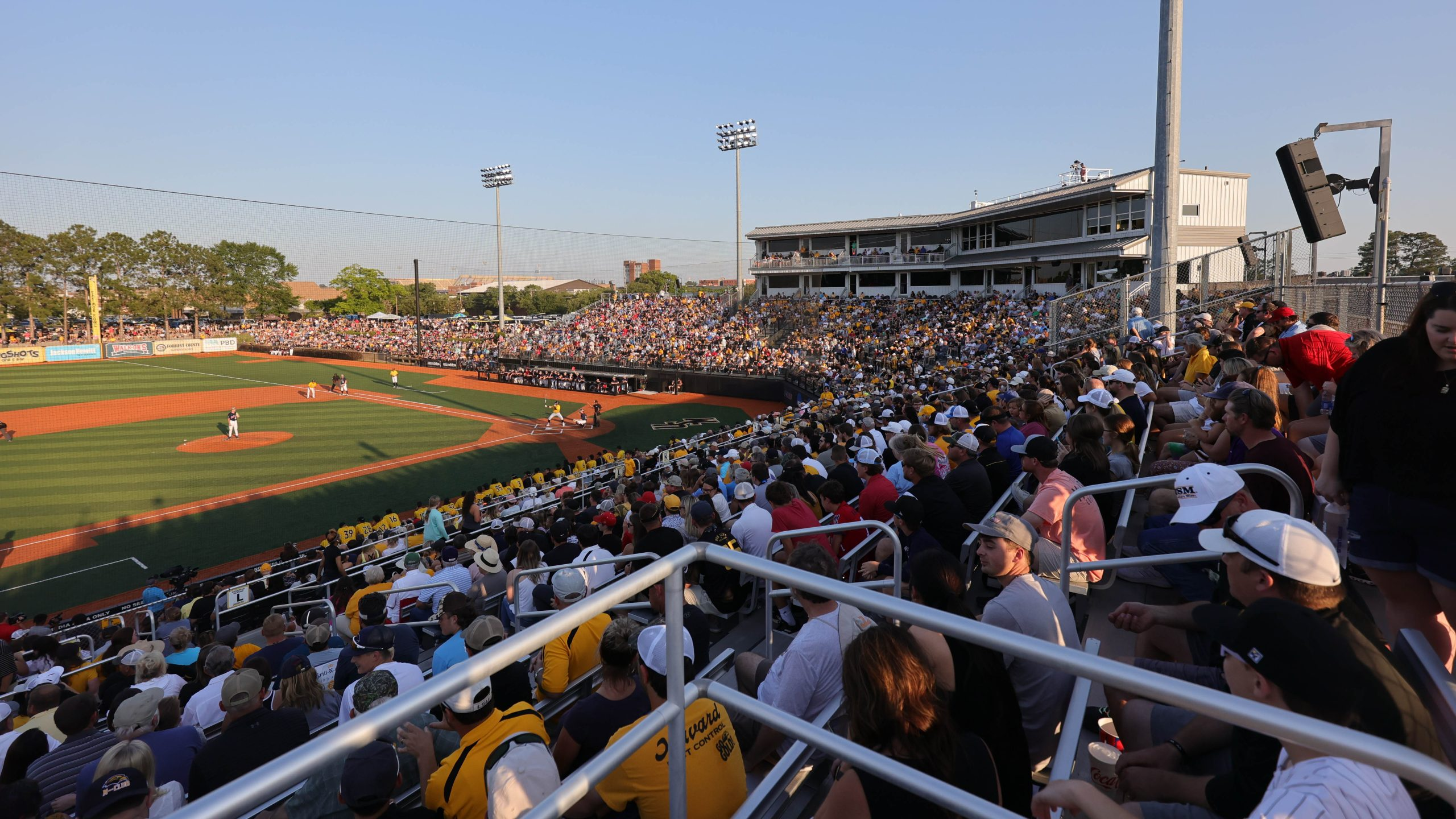
- Pete Taylor Park
- Interactive map of Pete Taylor Park/Hill Denson Field
- Location: Hattiesburg, Mississippi
- Coordinates: 31°20′0″N 89°20′17″W
- Owner: University of Southern Mississippi
- Operator: University of Southern Mississippi
- Capacity: 4,300
- Surface: Turf
- Record attendance: 6,346
- Field size: Left Field: 340 feet (100 m); Center Field: 400 feet (120 m); Right Field: 340 feet (100 m)

Construction
- Opened: February 19, 1985; 41 years ago

Tenants
- Southern Miss Golden Eagles baseball (NCAA D1 Sun Belt); C-USA Tournament (1996, 2005, 2009, 2014, 2015, 2016, 2022); Metro Tournament (1990)

Pete Taylor Park is a baseball stadium located in Hattiesburg, Mississippi, that is home to the Southern Miss Golden Eagles baseball team.

In 2011, Southern Miss announced the expansion of Pete Taylor Park. The plans include adding 1,358 seats and expanding the seating capacity to 4,300. The expansion was completed for the start of the 2012 season.

== Events ==
The park hosted the 1990 Metro Conference baseball tournament. and has hosted the Conference USA baseball tournament seven times in 1996, 2005, 2009, 2014, 2015, 2016, and 2022.

== Attendance ==
In 2022, the Golden Eagles ranked 10th among Division I baseball programs in attendance, averaging 4,771 per home game and a cumulative attendance of 133,578. - 2022 Division I Baseball Attendance - Final

=== Top baseball crowds at Pete Taylor Park ===
Rank	Attendance	Opponent	Date
1	6,346	Ole Miss	5/12/22
2	5,706	La Tech	4/2/22
3	5,689	Ole Miss	3/30/11
4	5,658	LSU	4/9/08
5	5,469	La Tech	4/1/22
6	5,458	Ole Miss	4/11/17
7	5,388	Alabama	3/16/22
8	5,377	Ole Miss	4/5/05
9	5,202	Ole Miss	5/1/19
10	5,177	Mississippi State	4/26/06
11	5,138	La Tech	4/3/22
12	5,132	Ole Miss	4/11/07
13	4,988	Mississippi State	2/17/18
14	4,970	Mississippi State	2/18/18
15	4,952	Rice	4/23/22
16	4,950	Rice	4/23/16
17	4,948	Mississippi State	2/16/18
18	4,904	Rice	4/22/22
19	4,822	Rice	4/24/22
20	4,760	Mississippi State	4/7/04
21	4,737	North Alabama	2/19/22
22	4,705	Ole Miss	4/22/09
23	4,688	New Orleans	4/20/22
24	4,673	Ole Miss	3/23/04
25	4,663	Florida Atlantic	3/19/22
26	4,632	Jacksonville St.	2/25/22
27	4,601	Baylor	6/1/03
28	4,580	La Tech	5/11/18

== See also ==
- List of NCAA Division I baseball venues
