= Anthony Rendon =

American baseball player (born 1990)

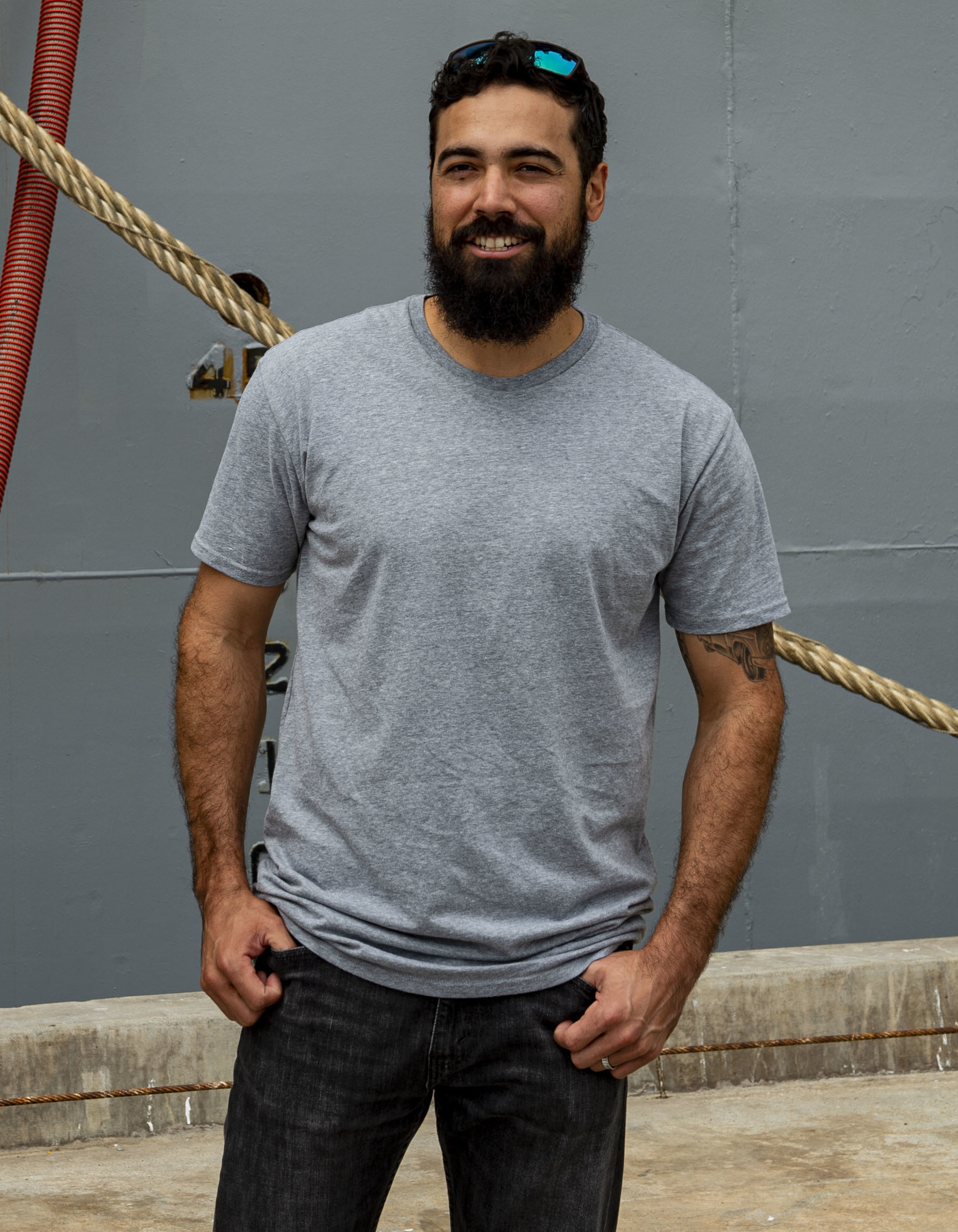
- Rendon in 2022

Free agent
- Third baseman
- Born: June 6, 1990 (age 36); Houston, Texas, U.S.
- Bats: Right Throws: Right

MLB debut
- April 21, 2013, for the Washington Nationals

MLB statistics (through 2024 season)
- Batting average: .280
- Hits: 1,218
- Home runs: 158
- Runs batted in: 671
- Stats at Baseball Reference

Teams
- Washington Nationals (2013–2019); Los Angeles Angels (2020–2024)

Career highlights and awards
- All-Star (2019); World Series champion (2019); All-MLB First Team (2019); 2× Silver Slugger Award (2014, 2019); NL Comeback Player of the Year (2016); MLB RBI leader (2019); Dick Howser Trophy (2010)

Anthony Michael Rendon (/rɛnˈdoʊn/, ren-DOHN; born June 6, 1990) is an American baseball third baseman who is a free agent. He has played in Major League Baseball (MLB) for the Washington Nationals and Los Angeles Angels.

Rendon played college baseball for the Rice University Owls, where he won the 2010 Dick Howser Trophy. He was selected sixth overall in the 2011 MLB draft by the Nationals, and made his MLB debut in 2013. During his time with the Nationals, Rendon won the Silver Slugger Award in 2014 and 2019, NL Comeback Player of the Year in 2016, was named to the 2019 NL All-Star Team, and led the National League in RBI in 2019. He was a key member of the Nationals' 2019 World Series championship team.

Rendon signed a seven-year, $245 million contract with the Los Angeles Angels in December 2019. Rendon's tenure with the Angels was marred by injuries, and he played in only 257 games with the team over six seasons.

== Early life ==
Rendon is the son of Rene and Bridget Rendon. He has a brother named David. Rendon is Mexican-American. For the first two and a half years of high school, Rendon attended George Bush High School, before transferring to Lamar High School. As a senior, he was a first-team 5A all-state shortstop and an All-Greater Houston selection by the Houston Chronicle after he hit .570 with eight home runs, 17 doubles, 56 runs batted in, 56 runs, and 13 stolen bases. Out of high school, Rendon was drafted in the 27th round of the Major League Baseball Draft by the Atlanta Braves. He turned down their signing bonus to play for Rice University and head coach Wayne Graham.

== College career ==
As a freshman in 2009, Rendon was named Baseball America's Freshman of the Year, All-America, Freshman All-American, NCBWA's District VII Player of the Year, NCAA All-Regional Team, Conference USA Player of the Year, All-Conference USA (first team), Conference USA All-Tournament Team, and MVP of the Silver Glove Series with cross-town rival, University of Houston. As a true freshman, he hit .388 with 20 home runs and 72 runs batted in, starting in all 61 of the Owls' games. Rendon was also nominated for both the Dick Howser Trophy and the Golden Spikes Award in his first season at the college level. He led the conference in numerous offensive categories. In Rice's last game, in the Baton Rouge Super Regional, Rendon suffered an ankle injury that required surgery.

As a sophomore in 2010, Rendon won the Dick Howser Trophy and was Baseball America's College Player of the Year, becoming the first underclassman in a decade to win the latter award. Additionally, he was named the Rawlings Sporting Goods National Player of the Year, Conference USA Male Athlete of the Year, District VII Player of the Year, First Team All-American, All-south Region, Most Outstanding Player of the NCAA Austin Regional, All-Conference USA, All-Conference USA Tournament, and Conference USA Academic Honor Roll. He is only the second player to be named Conference USA Player of the Year twice. He finished the season hitting .394 with 26 home runs and 85 runs batted in, again starting in every one of the Owls' 63 games. Rendon's 26 home runs were the second-highest single season total in school history; the only other Owl to hit more home runs in a year was Lance Berkman. After his Rice season ended, Rendon was invited to represent his country playing on the international circuit for Team USA. He suffered another right ankle injury in the first game against South Korea.

Houston mayor Annise Parker declared June 29, 2010 to be "Anthony Rendon Day" in Houston. Rendon was a member of Wiess College while at Rice.

== Professional career ==
=== Washington Nationals ===
The Washington Nationals selected Rendon in the first round, with the sixth overall selection, of the 2011 Major League Baseball draft. Following the 2012 season, many scouts rated Rendon as the best prospect in the Nationals organization and one of the top prospects in MLB.

==== 2013 ====
Rendon started the 2013 season with the Double-A Harrisburg Senators. He was called up by the Washington Nationals on April 20 when Ryan Zimmerman was placed on the disabled list. Rendon was optioned back to the Harrisburg Senators when Zimmerman came off the disabled list on May 3.

Rendon was recalled by the Nationals on June 4, 2013. He replaced second baseman Danny Espinosa. Days later, on June 15, Rendon clubbed his first major league home run off Vinnie Pestano of the Cleveland Indians. The ninth-inning solo shot put the Nationals on top and they won 7–6.

Rendon finished the season with the Nationals, putting up a .265/.329/.396 triple slash with seven home runs across 98 games with the major league club.

==== 2014 ====
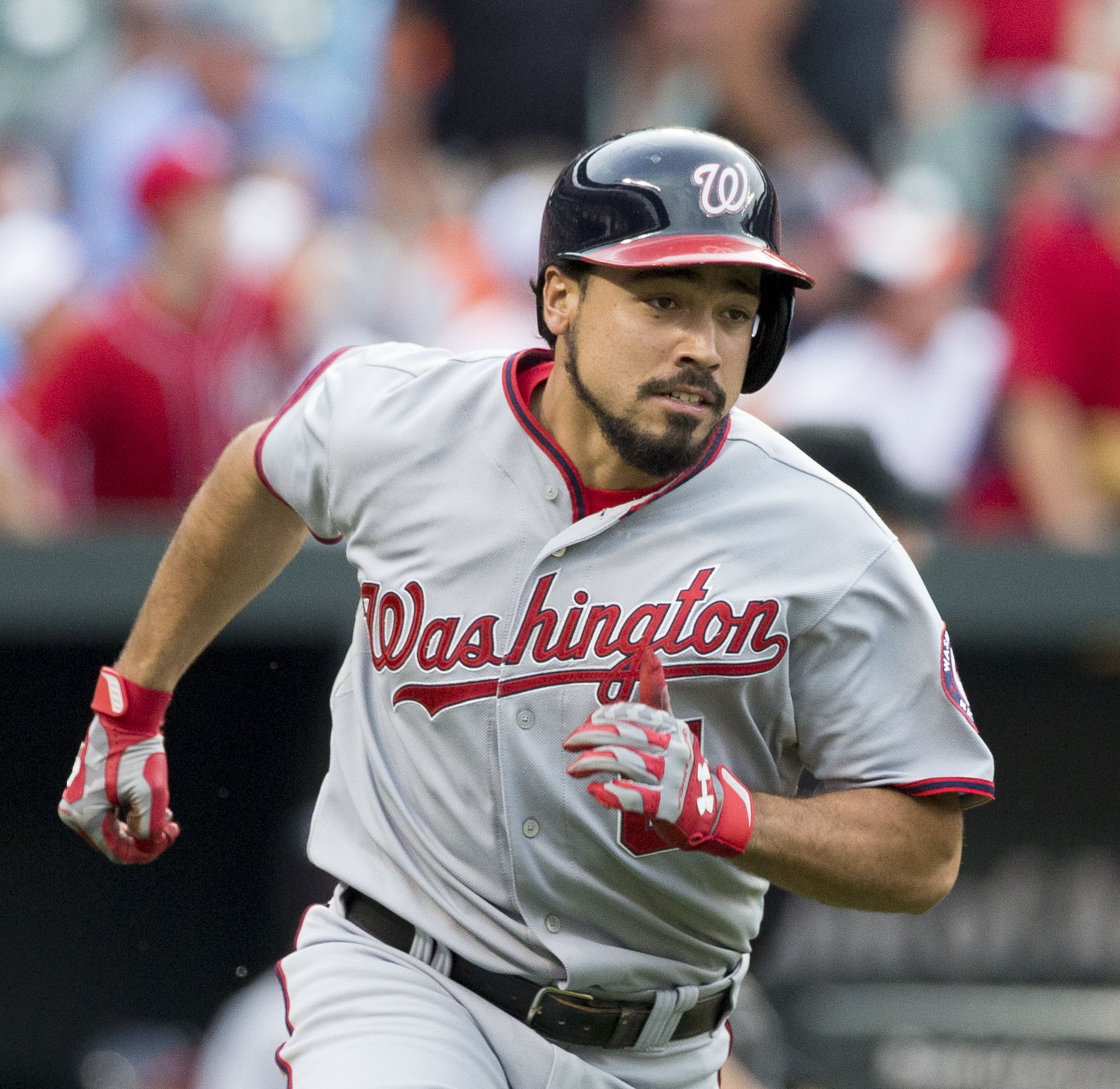
Rendon with the Washington Nationals in 2014

After playing mostly second base the previous year, Rendon was moved back to his "natural position" as the Nationals' third baseman in the 2014 season. The year would be a breakout one for Rendon, who led the National League in runs scored, with 111, while putting up a .287/.351/.473 slash line, hitting 21 home runs, driving in 83 runs, and stealing 17 bases over the course of the season. Rendon placed fifth in National League Most Valuable Player voting and was awarded a Silver Slugger for his performance as a top-hitting third baseman. He ranked second among National League position players in wins above replacement, just behind Andrew McCutchen of the Pittsburgh Pirates.

While Rendon emerged as a key cog in the Nationals' offense during the season, his prowess in the playoffs was noteworthy as well, as he hit .368 in the 2014 National League Division Series against the San Francisco Giants.

==== 2015 ====
Rendon sprained the medial collateral ligament in his left knee early during spring training in 2015, and then strained an oblique muscle while on a rehab assignment with the Class-AA Harrisburg Senators, being shut down on May 4. Rendon finally returned to major league action on June 4, 2015, but found himself moved back to second base, with the job of everyday third baseman being held down by new acquisition Yunel Escobar.

Rendon was part of a spectacular defensive play in an August 15, 2015, game against the San Francisco Giants. A sharp grounder off the bat of Brandon Crawford was deflected off the glove of first baseman Clint Robinson, caroming high into the air. Playing deep on the infield shift, Rendon made a barehand grab on the deflected ball and fired to pitcher Felipe Rivero, who gloved it while diving across the first base bag to retire Crawford. Giants broadcasters Duane Kuiper and Mike Krukow described the play as one of the greatest they had ever seen.

All in all, Rendon played in just 80 regular-season games in 2015 and put up a .264/.344/.363 slash line. His power was noticeably sapped following the oblique injury, as he hit just five home runs over the course of the season.

==== 2016 ====
Rendon returned to form with a batting line over the course of the 2016 season closely mimicking his 2014 campaign, hitting .270/.348/.450 with 20 home runs and 85 RBIs. He avoided spending any time on the disabled list, appearing in all but six regular-season games for the Nationals and exclusively playing third base, with Escobar traded to the Los Angeles Angels of Anaheim during the off-season.

On September 6, 2016, Rendon hit his first career grand slam off Williams Perez, which provided the Nationals with a winning margin of victory over the division rival Atlanta Braves in the 9–7 contest.

For his improved performance during the season, Rendon was named the National League Comeback Player of the Year.

==== 2017 ====
On April 30, 2017, Rendon went six-for-six with three home runs and 10 RBI in a 23–5 win over the division rival New York Mets. He became the 13th major leaguer with 10 or more RBI in one game while setting a Nationals record. He became the third player in major league history to attain both six hits and ten RBI in the same game, following Jim Bottomley (1924) and Walker Cooper (1949).

Despite leading all National League position players in wins above replacement during the first half of the season, Rendon was not selected to participate in the All-Star Game. He was one of the options in the "final vote" but lost out to Justin Turner of the Los Angeles Dodgers. Despite the All-Star snub, Rendon was named as Player of the Week in the National League on July 17, 2017, for the week abbreviated by the All-Star break. It was his first time so honored. Rendon hit .636 during the week with three home runs to earn the award. In 2017, he batted .301/.403/.533 with 25 home runs and 100 RBI.

==== 2018 ====
In 2018, Rendon batted .308 (4th in the NL)/.374/.535 (7th in the NL) with 24 home runs, and led the National League with 44 doubles.

==== 2019 ====
Prior to the 2019 season, Rendon indicated a willingness to sign an extension with the Nationals. In September 2019, the Nationals reportedly offered him a seven-year extension worth $210-215 million.

Rendon was selected to the 2019 MLB All-Star Game for the first time in his career. Rendon said he was honored to be chosen, but opted not to attend the game in Cleveland in order to recover from minor injuries.

In 2019, Rendon batted .319/.412/.598 with 34 home runs, led the NL with 44 doubles for the second year in a row, and led the majors in RBIs (126).

Rendon was also key to the Nationals' 2019 World Series win. He hit for a 1.003 OPS in the postseason to help lead the team to its first-ever World Series championship. He hit key home runs in Games 6 and 7 of the World Series, and his 8 RBIs for the 2019 World Series were the most by a Nationals player.

Following the 2019 World Series, Rendon and Nationals star pitcher Stephen Strasburg both entered free agency. Owner Mark Lerner indicated that the team would not be able to afford to sign both players.

During his seven seasons with the Nationals, Rendon batted .290 with 136 home runs and 546 RBIs.

=== Los Angeles Angels ===
On December 11, 2019, Rendon agreed to a seven-year, $245 million contract with the Los Angeles Angels. He was formally introduced as an Angel on December 14, 2019. In an article entitled "Anthony Rendon Is Instantly Mike Trout's Best Teammate", Neil Payne of FiveThirtyEight.com noted that Rendon's 6.7 Wins Above Replacement (WAR) in 2019 was superior to the single-season WAR of any teammate that star Angels outfielder Mike Trout had played with during his MLB career.

==== 2020 ====
On July 28, 2020, Rendon made his Angels debut in the shortened 60-game season. In Rendon's first 12 games with the Angels, he went 28 plate appearances without getting a hit. He ended the hitless streak on August 10, 2020, hitting a home run off of Sean Manaea of the Oakland Athletics. That same night, he recorded his 1000th MLB career hit.

In a COVID-shortened season in 2020, Rendon batted .286/.418/.497 with 9 home runs and 31 RBIs.

==== 2021 ====
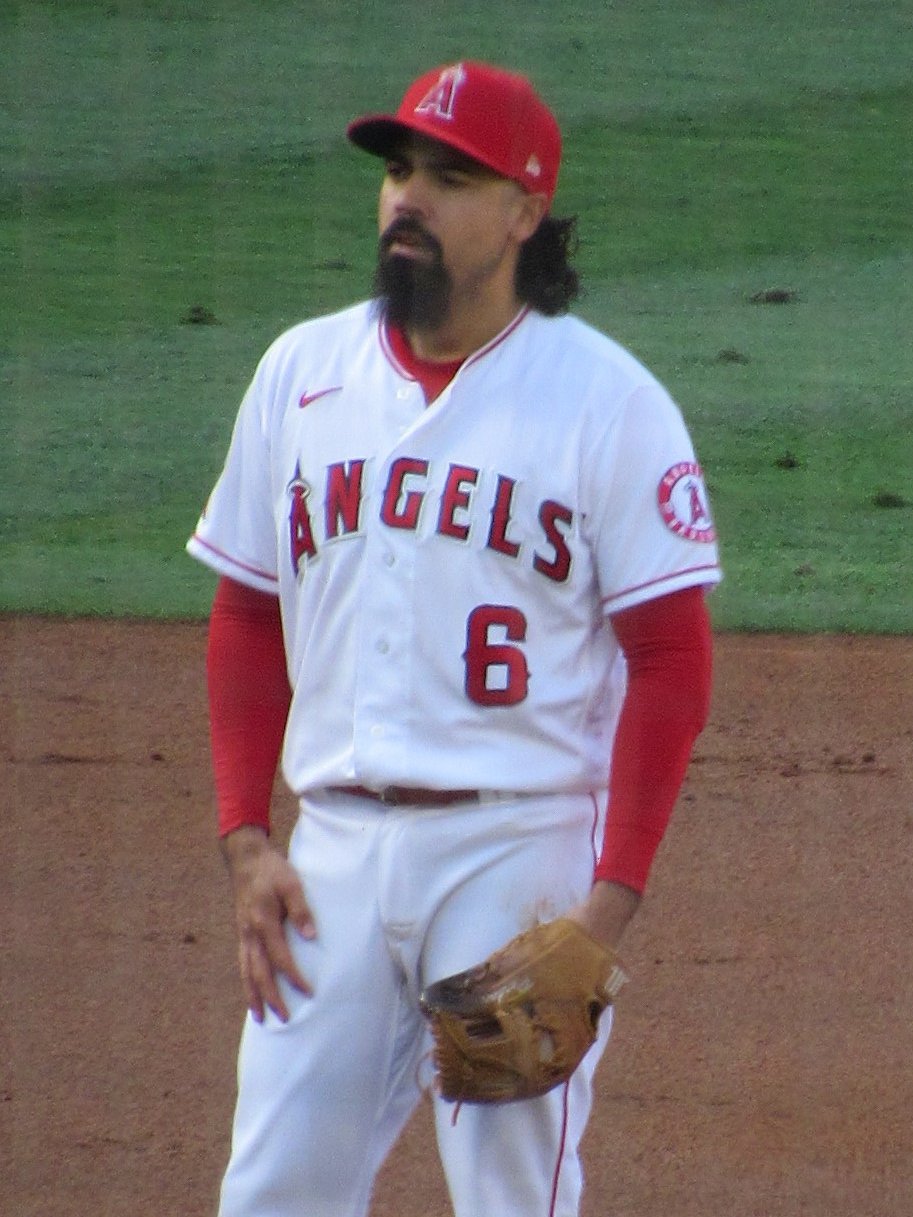
Rendon with the Los Angeles Angels in 2021

On April 12, Rendon was placed on the 10-day injured list after suffering a groin strain. On May 5, Rendon was placed on the 10-day injured list for the second time after suffering a left knee contusion. On June 7, Rendon notched his 600th career RBI with an RBI single off of Kansas City Royals starter Jackson Kowar. On July 6, Rendon was placed on the injured list for the third time after suffering a left hamstring strain. The Angels would later announce on August 4 that Rendon would have season ending surgery to repair a right hip impingement. He finished the season batting .240/.329/.382 in 58 games.

==== 2022 ====
On May 10, 2022, during Reid Detmers' no-hitter, Rendon hit his first left-handed home run, against position player pitcher Brett Phillips. This was also the first time Rendon batted left-handed in a major league game. For the next game, Angels manager Joe Maddon listed Rendon as a switch hitter.

On June 17, the Angels stated that Rendon would undergo surgery on his right wrist, for which he was expected to miss the remainder of the season.

On June 26, Rendon was part of a bench-clearing brawl between the Angels and Seattle Mariners. After Mariners outfielder Jesse Winker was hit by a pitch thrown by Andrew Wantz, Winker charged the Angels' dugout. During the ensuing brawl, Rendon struck Winker in the face with his non-injured left hand while wearing a cast on his right hand. He received a five-game suspension for his involvement in the brawl. Despite the original expectation that Rendon would be out for the remainder of the 2022 season, the Angels activated him from the injured list on September 28 and he began serving his suspension. He returned to the Angels lineup on October 3 to play the final three games of the season against the Oakland Athletics. He finished the season batting .229 with five home runs and 24 RBIs in 47 games.

==== 2023 ====
On April 3, 2023, Rendon was involved in a physical confrontation with a fan after the Angels' Opening Day game against the Oakland Athletics. As shown in video footage, while the Angels were walking to the clubhouse, Rendon grabbed an Athletics fan by his shirt and accused him of heckling him during the game, which the fan repeatedly denied in the moment. Rendon used profanities when speaking to the fan and attempted to slap him before leaving with the team. Rendon received a four-game suspension for the incident and was also fined an undisclosed amount.

On July 4, Rendon suffered a season-ending injury when he fouled a ball off his lower leg during a game against the San Diego Padres. Although Rendon was originally diagnosed with a contusion, it was later revealed that he had suffered a fractured tibia. Rendon finished the season having batted .236 with 2 home runs and a .678 OPS in 43 games.

==== 2024 ====
In 2024, Rendon hit .267 in 19 games before suffering a left hamstring strain while attempting to beat out a ground ball on April 20, 2024. After the injury was diagnosed as a high–grade partial tear, Rendon was transferred to the 60–day injured list on May 9. He was activated from the injured list on July 8. He returned to the injured list yet again on July 30. After returning to the Angels in early August, Rendon made yet another trip to the injured list with an oblique injury on September 10. This was the 11th time Rendon landed on the injured list in his first five seasons with the Angels.

In the 57 games he appeared in during the 2024 season, Rendon hit no home runs and compiled a .218 batting average in 206 at bats.

==== 2025 ====
Rendon missed the entire 2025 season due to a left hip injury that required surgery. In February 2025, Zachary D. Rymer of Bleacher Report ranked Rendon's seven-year, $245 million contract with the Angels as the sixth-worst contract in recent major league baseball history. Also in February 2025, Nick Selbe of Sports Illustrated wrote that "Rendon's seven-year, $245 million contract with the Angels may go down as the worst in MLB history".

After the conclusion of the 2025 season, the Angels and Rendon agreed to a restructuring of his contract, marking an end to his tenure with the team. Rendon will receive the remaining $38 million of his contract in deferred payments over the following three to five years.

== Personal life ==
Rendon is frequently described by sports media as quiet and modest, qualities that when combined with his strong all-around offensive and defensive performance as an infielder for the Washington Nationals have led some, including 2016–17 Nationals manager Dusty Baker, to dub him one of the most "underrated" players in Major League Baseball. Explaining his philosophy on baseball to The Washington Post during spring training in 2017, Rendon said, "Obviously, I want to win, but at the same time, at the end of the day, it’s a game and that’s what I’m going to treat it as." He claimed in a 2014 interview with the Post that he prefers watching the History Channel to baseball, calling the games "too long and boring".

Rendon and his wife Amanda have four children together. On July 26, 2018, Rendon took leave from the Nationals for several days to attend to the birth of his first child. They reside in Katy, Texas during the offseason, and in Newport Beach, California during the season.

An avid basketball fan, Rendon follows the Houston Rockets, his hometown NBA team. He has maintained close ties to the Houston area. In the aftermath of Hurricane Harvey in August 2017, Rendon and then-Nationals teammate Matt Albers, a fellow Houstonian, set up a YouCaring fundraiser page to raise money for donations to the Houston Food Bank.

Rendon is a born-again Christian. In a 2018 interview, he said, "At the end, I want to be more ‘Christian’ than ‘baseball player.’"

== See also ==
- List of Major League Baseball annual runs scored leaders
- List of Major League Baseball single-game hits leaders
- List of Major League Baseball single-game runs batted in leaders
