= Bat boy =

Person carrying baseball bats

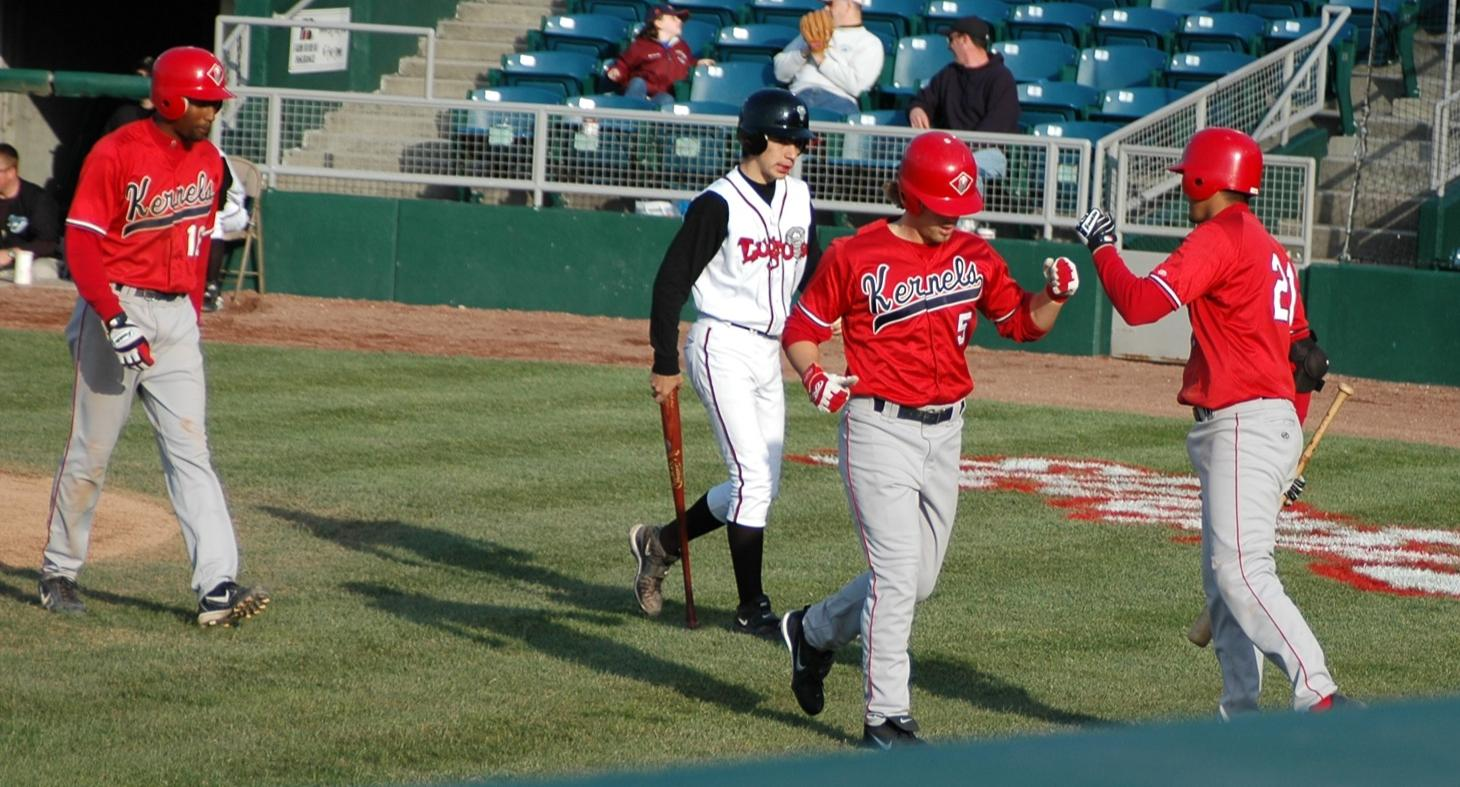
A Lansing Lugnuts batboy (in white) carrying a baseball bat away from home plate.

In baseball, a bat boy, often simply batboy, or bat girl is a person, commonly a youth, who carries baseball bats to the players on a baseball team. Duties of a batboy may also include handling and preparing players’ equipment and bringing baseballs to the umpire during the game. During games, a batboy remains in or near a team's dugout and the area around home plate.

A bat boy should not be confused with ball boys, who are stationed down the foul lines to retrieve foul balls. As batboys are stationed on the field, albeit in foul territory, they can occasionally interfere with play; such events are governed by Rule 6.01(d), the main point of which is that if the interference is unintentional, any live ball remains alive and in play.

== History ==
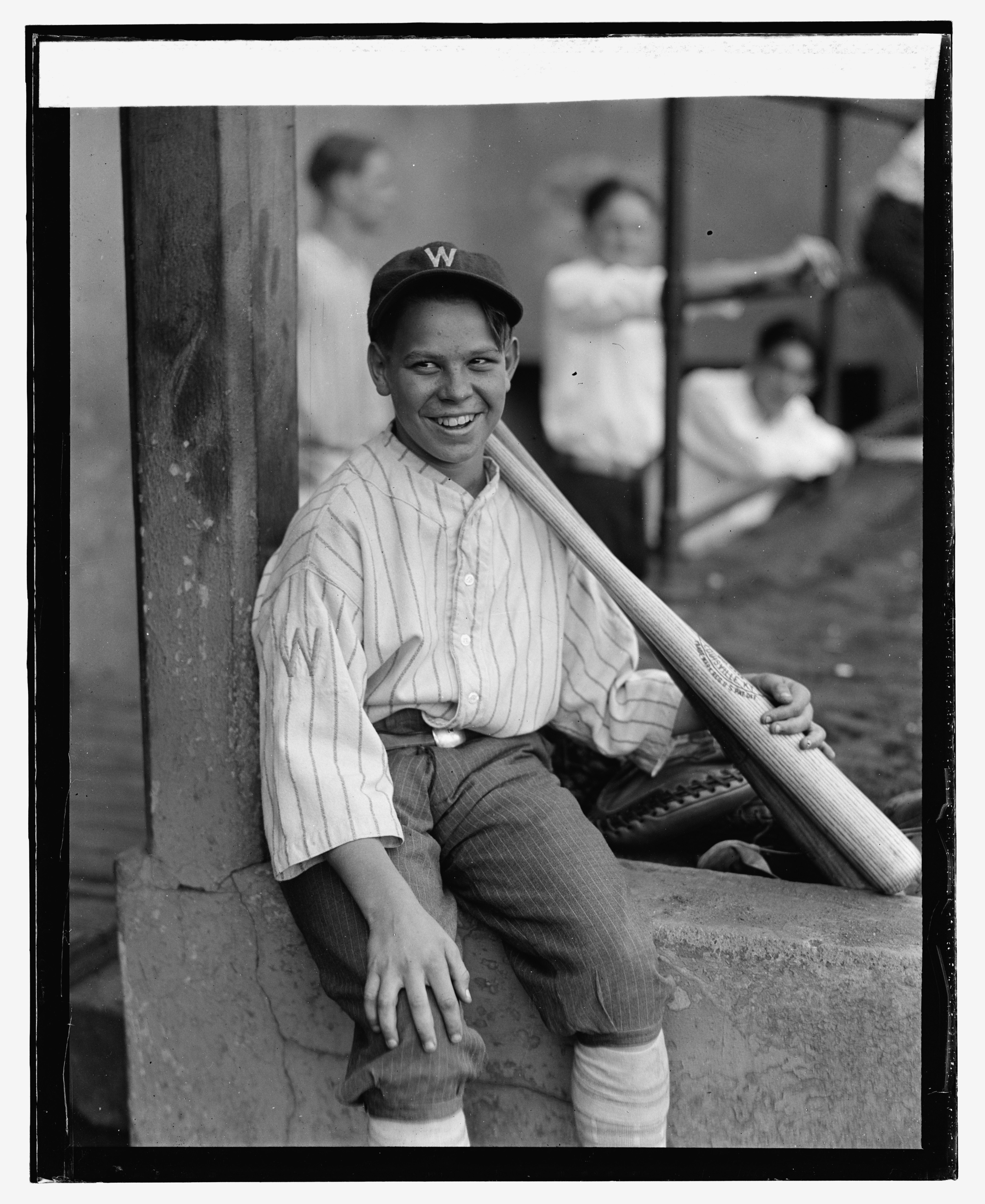
Thirteen-year-old Calvin Griffith as a bat boy for the Washington Senators in 1925

Mascots and bat boys had both been part of baseball since the 1880s. Perhaps the most famous mascot/batboy was Eddie Bennett, who was supposedly hired as a mascot by the Chicago White Sox at the urging of Happy Felsch in 1919, a tale Eddie told often but no White Sox player ever corroborated. After the 1919 World Series scandal, he was hired by the Brooklyn Dodgers in 1920. When the Dodgers lost the 1920 World Series to the Cleveland Indians, some suggested the four straight losses on the road were due to leaving Bennett behind. He then served for almost 12 years as mascot/batboy for the New York Yankees.

Calvin Griffith served as a bat boy for the Washington Senators, which was owned by his uncle Clark Griffith, including during the World Series of 1924 and 1925. The younger Griffith became the principal owner of the franchise upon the death of the elder Griffith in 1955, and orchestrated the relocation of the franchise after the 1960 season; the team has competed as the Minnesota Twins since 1961.

== Uniforms ==
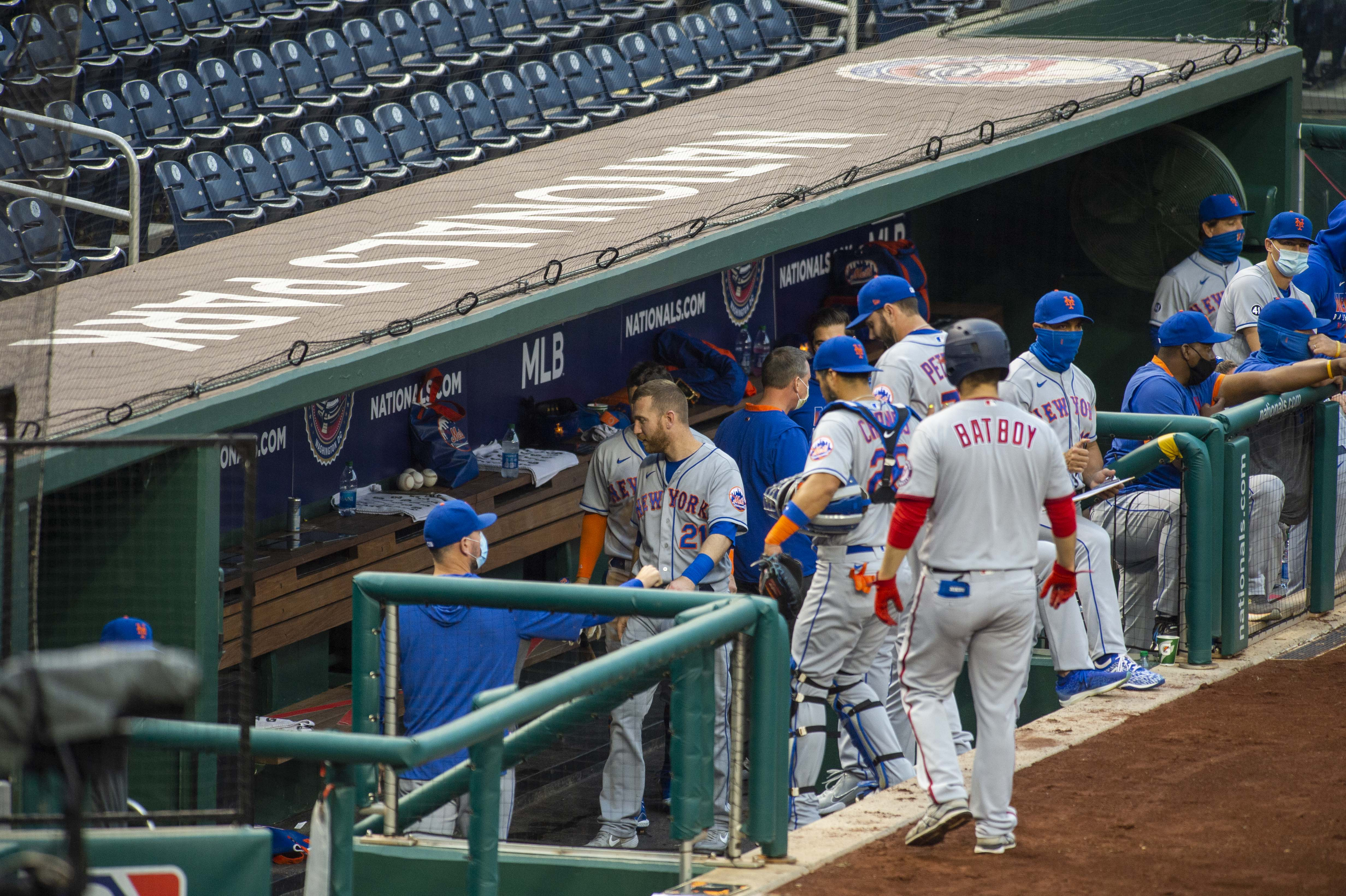
A bat boy for the visiting New York Mets wearing a uniform of the home Washington Nationals with "BAT BOY" lettering and no number

Bat boys typically wear the same uniform design as their associated team. They will also usually wear a batting helmet to protect them from flying balls or bats.

During any given major league game, both the home and visiting team bat boys will be drawn from the city where the game is taking place (batboys typically do not travel on the road with their team, unless they are relatives of a player). Home bat boys often have regular jobs with a team, and thus may wear their first names on their uniforms; visiting teams, on the other hand, usually do not know who will be serving as their bat boys on the road, and thus will send uniforms of various sizes to accommodate bat boys of varying heights and weights.

A bat boy may be provided his own number, but will usually wear 00 or 'BB' in its place. If a bat boy uniform does not have a first name on it, it will usually have the term 'BAT BOY' or no name at all.

== In the news ==
- In the 2002 World Series, a bat boy (Darren Baker, the 3 1/2 year old son of San Francisco Giants manager Dusty Baker) was involved in an incident when he went out to get a bat while play was still in progress. J. T. Snow, while in the act of scoring a run for the Giants, grabbed the young boy at home plate, avoiding the bat boy possibly being involved in a collision with other baserunners or players from the opposing team. After the incident, Major League Baseball set a minimum age of 14 for bat boys.
- Matthew McGough described his bat boy experiences with the New York Yankees in Bat Boy: My True-Life Adventures Coming of Age with the New York Yankees, a book published by Doubleday in 2005. McGough's book served as the basis for Clubhouse, a prime-time television show that aired on CBS in the fall of 2004.
- On April 27, 2007, former New York Mets bat boy (1985–1995) Kirk Radomski pleaded guilty in United States district court to money laundering and illegal distribution of anabolic steroids, human growth hormone, Clenbuterol, amphetamines and other drugs to "dozens of current and former Major League Baseball players, and associates, on teams throughout Major League Baseball." He faced a maximum sentence of 25 years in prison and a $500,000 fine, but he was sentenced to 5 years' probation and ordered to pay a fine of $18,575 for his cooperation with the federal government and the Mitchell Report.
- In a pregame ceremony on May 5, 2007, Stan Bronson Jr. received recognition by Guinness World Records as the "Most Durable Batboy" ever. Bronson, known as "Stan The Man", had served as the bat boy for the University of Memphis baseball team since the 1958 season. His 50 years of service was recognized in the 2008 edition of the Guinness book.
- Dominick Ardovino wrote about his bat boy experience with the New York Mets in The Bat Boy (New York: McGraw-Hill, 1967).

== Bat boys who became major-league players ==
Examples of bat boys who went on to play in the major leagues include Drew Storen, who served as a bat boy for the Montreal Expos when the team visited Cincinnati, and Jesse Litsch, who was a bat boy for the Tampa Bay Devil Rays in 2001 and 2002. The aforementioned Darren Baker made his MLB debut in 2024, with the Washington Nationals.

== In popular culture ==
The fictional bat boy Bobby Savoy is a supporting character in the 1984 film The Natural. At the finale, Bobby gives the main character, Roy Hobbs, a bat that he's made with Hobbs's help after Hobbs breaks his own personally made childhood bat.

Two Warner Brothers cartoons, Porky's Baseball Broadcast and Baseball Bugs, feature sight-gags involving bat boys who fly in on bat wings to deliver bats.

== See also ==
- Water boy
