= Tommy Manzella =

American baseball player (born 1983)

- Shortstop
- Born: April 16, 1983 (age 42); Chalmette, Louisiana, U.S.
- Batted: Right Threw: Right

MLB debut
- September 8, 2009, for the Houston Astros

Last MLB appearance
- October 3, 2010, for the Houston Astros

MLB statistics
- Batting average: .224
- Home runs: 1
- Runs batted in: 21
- Stats at Baseball Reference

Teams
- Houston Astros (2009–2010)

Thomas Samuel Manzella, Jr. (born April 16, 1983) is an American former professional baseball shortstop. He played in Major League Baseball (MLB) for the Houston Astros.

== Early career ==
=== High school ===
Manzella was born in Chalmette, Louisiana and attended Archbishop Hannan High School, and was a three-year starting shortstop. He earned All-District 8-4A, All-St. Bernard Parish and academic all-state honors each year. He hit .360 with 3 home runs and 24 RBIs during his senior season. He was selected to play in the LHSAA All-Star Game, and earned St. Bernard Parish Most Outstanding Player recognition as a senior.

=== NCAA ===
Manzella attended Tulane University and played for the Tulane Green Wave baseball team. He played in 55 games as a true freshman, mostly at shortstop, and led the team with 135 assists while finishing fifth on the team with a batting average .294. He earned All-Tournament honors at the 2002 Conference USA Tournament after hitting .615 (8-for-13) with a double and five RBIs during the tournament. In 2003, he started all 59 games at second base and received honorable-mention All-Louisiana honors after tying for the team lead in doubles (20) while ranking tied for second in RBIs (44). Manzella was again named to the C-USA All-Tournament Team after hitting .615 (8-for-13) with an RBI, a walk, and a stolen base.

In 2004, he was the only player on the team to start at the same position in all 62 games, and earned second-team All-Louisiana honors after leading the team in assists (185) and sacrifice bunts (school-record 12) while ranking second in steals (11). He was named to NCAA Oxford Regional All-Tournament Team after hitting .417 (5-for-12) with three RBIs and two sacrifice bunts, and posted nine putouts and nine assists while helping turn three double plays defensively. In 2005, he started all 65 games at shortstop and earned first-team All-Conference USA honors after leading the team in batting average (.356), hits (98), stolen bases (21) and assists (171), while tying for first in doubles (24), ranking second in RBIs (62), third in total bases (150), fourth in slugging percentage (.545) and runs scored (58), and fifth in home runs (eight). He led C-USA in hits and stolen bases. In the NCAA New Orleans Super Regional, Manzella started all three games at shortstop, hitting .400 (6-for-15) with two doubles and two RBIs and posted a .417 on-base percentage with a walk. He had two hits in all three games, and posted seven putouts, five assists, and one error defensively.

=== Collegiate summer baseball ===
Upon graduation, Manzella played for the Waynesboro Generals of the Valley League in 2002 and the Brewster Whitecaps of the Cape Cod League in 2003. In 2002, he earned All-Valley League honors as a shortstop and was named to the All Star Game roster as he led his team with nine stolen bases, and finished second on the club in batting average (.313) and doubles (5). In 2003, he led the Whitecaps in assists while collecting three doubles, a triple, six RBIs and four stolen bases.

== Professional career ==
=== Houston Astros ===
He was drafted by the Astros in the 3rd round of the 2005 Major League Baseball draft. Manzella went on to play for the Tri-City ValleyCats of the New York–Penn League. He played in 53 games and finished with a .232 batting average in 220 at-bats with 18 RBI, and five stolen bases.

He was promoted to the Lexington Legends in 2006, where he played 99 games and finished with a .275 batting average in 338 at-bats with seven home runs, 43 RBI, and 16 stolen bases along with a .956 fielding percentage. In 2007, Manzella split time between the Salem Avalanche and Corpus Christi Hooks, playing in 121 games with a .264 combined batting average in 451 at bats with one home run, 39 RBI, and 15 stolen bases.

In 2008, Manzella played in 54 games with the Hooks before being promoted to the Triple-A Round Rock Express, where he struggled with a .219 batting average with no home runs and 15 RBI, but had his best fielding percentage at .989.

The Astros signed Manzella to a one-year, $400,000 major league contract on February 15 after having added him to the 40-man roster in November to protect him from the Rule 5 draft. He was called up to the major leagues along with Chris Johnson and Billy Sadler by the Astros. He recorded his first major league hit, off of Donnie Veal of the Pittsburgh Pirates, on September 11.

Manzella was the Opening Day shortstop with the Astros in 2010, and Jeff Keppinger also got time there when he wasn't at second base. He went 13-58 (.224) with 3 RBI in April. Manzella hit his first major league home run, a two-run home run off of Rodrigo López of the Diamondbacks, on May 5, putting the Astros on top 2-1 in a game they eventually won 3-2. He hit .192 (14-73) with five RBI in May. When the Astros placed Kazuo Matsui on waivers on May 20, Keppinger took over full-time at second base, making Manzella the full-time shortstop. He was hitting .224 (13-58) in June before he fractured his left index finger on June 22 when Nate Schierholtz slid into it trying to steal second base. The Astros recalled Oswaldo Navarro to take over at shortstop, but they eventually acquired Ángel Sánchez to take over on July 1. He rehabbed at Corpus Christi and Round Rock for 11 games total before returning on August 19. He finished the year splitting time with Sánchez at shortstop. In 83 games with the Astros, he hit .225 with one home run, 21 RBI and a .973 fielding percentage.

Manzella was cut from spring training on March 24, 2011, and Matt Downs and Joe Inglett were named as the backup infielders to begin the regular season, while Sánchez was the shortstop. Manzella began 2011 with the Triple-A Oklahoma City RedHawks. With Clint Barmes established as the starting shortstop, and Sánchez as his backup, Manzella had no role on the major league roster, and on August 10, he was designated for assignment. In 109 games with Oklahoma City, he hit .230 with seven home runs and 48 RBI.

=== Arizona Diamondbacks ===
Manzella was claimed off waivers by the Arizona Diamondbacks on August 11. He was assigned to the Triple-A Reno Aces, where in 22 games to finish 2011, he hit .246 with one home run, three RBI and seven runs. After not being called up when the rosters expanded in September, he was designated for assignment on September 19; he cleared waivers and was sent outright Triple-A.

Manzella began 2012 with Reno, where he played in 15 games before being released on May 6. He was hitting 4-for-40 with two RBI and two runs.

=== Milwaukee Brewers ===
Manzella was signed to a minor league contract on May 8, 2012 by the Milwaukee Brewers. He provided depth in the infield after injuries to Alex González and Mat Gamel. On July 29, Manzella was released by the Brewers organization after playing for the Double-A Huntsville Stars. He was hitting .252 with one home and 28 RBI across 62 appearances.

=== Chicago White Sox ===
On July 31, 2012, Manzella signed a minor league contract with the Chicago White Sox. He was assigned to the Triple-A Charlotte Knights the following day. Manzella played in 14 games for the Knights, where he went 7-for-41 with six RBI and four runs. After the season, he became a minor league free agent.

=== Colorado Rockies ===
On December 13, 2012, Manzella signed a minor league contract with the Colorado Rockies. Manzella began the 2013 season with Colorado`s Triple-A affiliate, the Colorado Springs Sky Sox, and appeared in 32 games, but was released on May 28 after batting .190 in 32 games with no home runs and 10 RBI.

=== Toronto Blue Jays ===
On June 4, 2013, Manzella signed a minor league contract with the Toronto Blue Jays, and assigned him to their Double-A affiliate New Hampshire Fisher Cats. He started for the Fisher Cats at third base on June 4. Manzella was released on August 5. In 21 games with New Hampshire, he hit .265 with 10 RBI and 10 runs.

=== Chicago White Sox (second stint) ===
On August 12, 2013, Manzella signed a minor league contract with the Chicago White Sox, and started at shortstop for the Double-A Birmingham Barons that night. On August 30, after batting .059 through 34 at-bats, Manzella was released by the White Sox organization.

=== Arizona Diamondbacks ===
On January 10, 2014, Manzella signed a minor league contract with the Arizona Diamondbacks. He was released prior to the start of the regular season on March 26.
