= Memphis Tigers baseball =

American college baseball team

Memphis Tigers
- 2026 Memphis Tigers baseball team
- Founded: 1913; 113 years ago
- Overall record: 1,935–1,611–16 (.545)
- University: University of Memphis
- Head coach: Matt Riser (3rd season)
- Conference: The American
- Location: Memphis, Tennessee
- Home stadium: FedExPark (capacity: 2,000)
- Nickname: Tigers
- Colors: Blue and gray

NCAA tournament appearances
- 1976, 1978, 1981, 1994, 2007

Conference tournament champions
- Metro: 1976, 1978; Great Midwest: 1993, 1995

Memphis Tigers baseball is the varsity intercollegiate team representing the University of Memphis in the sport of college baseball at the Division I level of the National Collegiate Athletic Association (NCAA). The team plays its home games at FedExPark on campus in Memphis, Tennessee. The Tigers are members of the American Conference. Alumni of the program who have been Major League Baseball All-Stars include Dan Uggla and Charlie Lea.

== Memphis in the NCAA tournament ==
Year	Record	Pct	Notes
1976	1–2	.333	Rocky Mountain Regional
1978	3–2	.600	South Regional
1981	2–2	.500	East Regional
1994	2–2	.500	Midwest I Regional
2007	0–2	.000	Nashville Regional
TOTALS	8–10	.444	

== Head coaches ==
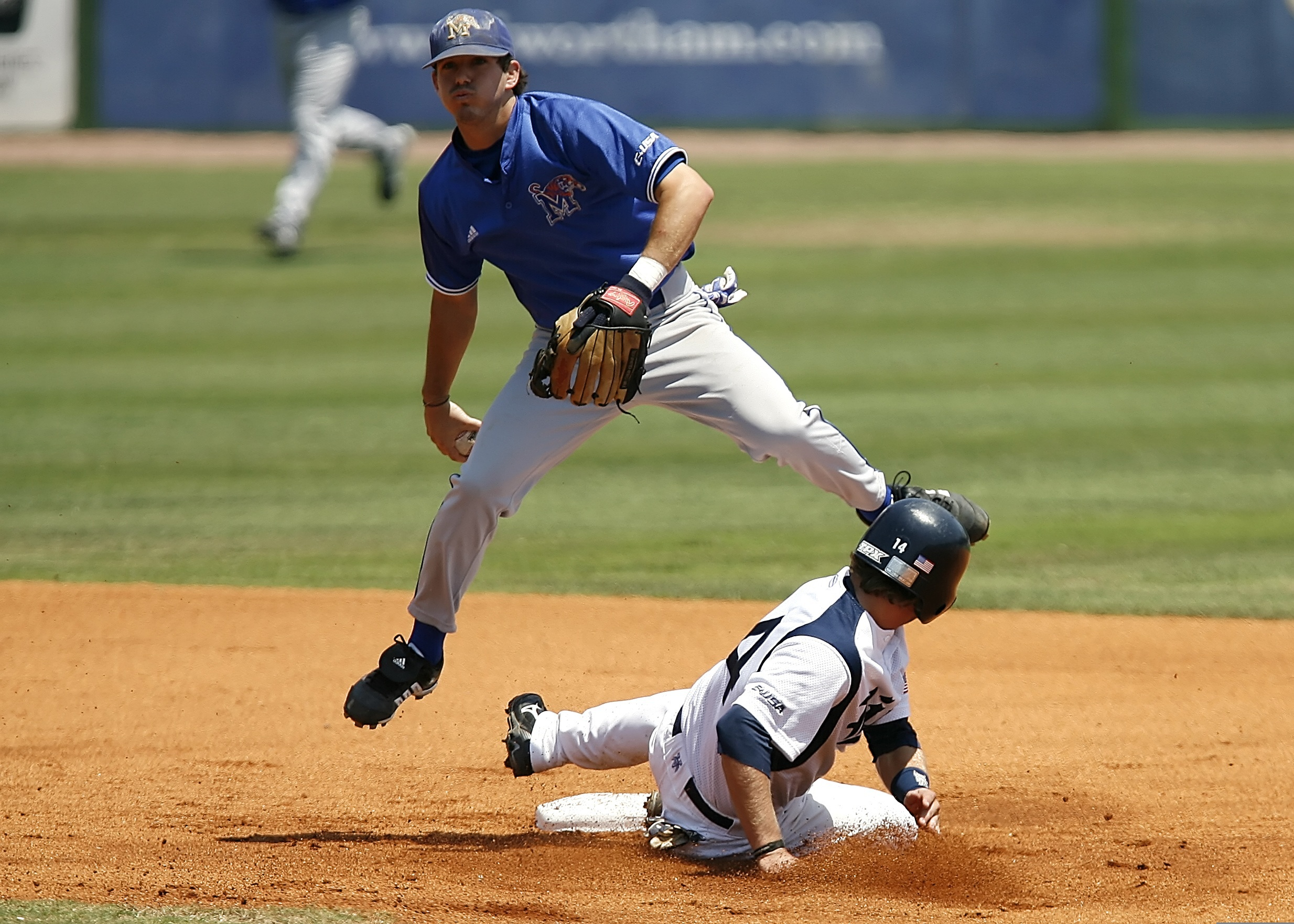
A game between Memphis and Rice in 2007

Name	Years	Won	Lost	Tied	Pct.
Clyde H. Wilson	1913–1919	61	23	1	.724
Mabon Crawford	1917	5	4	0	.556
Elmore George	1920–1921	20	11	0	.645
Lester Barnard	1922–1924	20	23	0	.465
Zach Curlin	1925–1929, 1932–1936	70	56	4	.554
Leo Davis	1948–1951	33	16	0	.673
R.A. Long	1952	7	9	0	.438
Arnold Ryan	1953	4	1	4	.667
Cully Rickard	1955	6	7	0	.462
Frank Price	1956–1957	11	15	0	.423
Dean Ehlers	1958–1961	39	39	0	.500
Bob Stephenson	1962	13	5	0	.722
Al Brown	1954, 1963–1971	158	127	5	.553
Bobby Kilpatrick	1972–1992	653	341	1	.657
Jeff Hopkins	1993–2000	239	207	1	.536
Dave Anderson	2001–2004	104	116	0	.473
Daron Schoenrock	2005–2022	463	533	0	.465
Kerrick Jackson	2023	29	28	0	.509
Matt Riser	2024–present	23	32	0	.418

== Year-by-year record ==
Record table
Season	Coach	Overall	Conference	Standing	Postseason
Clyde Wilson (No Conference) (1913–1919)
1913	Clyde Wilson	15–2-1	–	–	
1914	Clyde Wilson	11–4	–	–	
1915	Clyde Wilson	14–4	–	–	
1916	Clyde Wilson	7–4	–	–	
1917	Clyde Wilson/Mabon Crawford	5–6	–	–	
1918	Clyde Wilson	4–4	–	–	
1919	Clyde Wilson	10–3	–	–	
Clyde Wilson:		61-23–1			
Mabon Crawford:		5-4			
Elmore George (No Conference) (1920–1921)
1920	Elmore George	12–2	–	–	
1921	Elmore George	8–9	–	–	
Elmore George:		20-11			
Lester Barnard (No Conference) (1922–1924)
1922	Lester Barnard	6–6	–	–	
1923	Lester Barnard	5–10	–	–	
1924	Lester Barnard	9–7	–	–	
Lester Barnard:		20-23			
Zach Curlin (No Conference) (1925–1936)
1925	Zach Curlin	8–6–2	–	–	
1926	Zach Curlin	6–2	–	–	
1927	Zach Curlin	6–4	–	–	
1928	Zach Curlin	10–6	–	–	
1929	Zach Curlin	6–5	–	–	
1930	No team	–	–	–	
1931	No team	–	–	–	
1932	Zach Curlin	8–12	–	–	
1933	Zach Curlin	13–4	–	–	
1934	Zach Curlin	7–5–2	–	–	
1935	Zach Curlin	2–6	–	–	
1936	Zach Curlin	4–6	–	–	
Zach Curlin:		70-56–4			
No team (No Conference) (1937–1947)
1937-1947	No team	–	–	–	
No team:		-			
Leo Davis (No Conference) (1948–1951)
1948	Leo Davis	8–3	–	–	
1949	Leo Davis	8–5	–	–	
1950	Leo Davis	9–4	–	–	
1951	Leo Davis	8–4	–	–	
Leo Davis:		33-16			
R.A. Long (No Conference) (1952–1952)
1952	R.A. Long	7–9	–	–	
R.A Long:		7-9			
Arnold Ryan (No Conference) (1953–1953)
1953	Arnold Ryan	4–1–4	–	–	
Arnold Ryan:		4-1–4			
Al Brown (No Conference) (1954–1954)
1954	Al Brown	2–9	–	–	
Cully Rickard (No Conference) (1955–1955)
1955	Cully Rickard	6–7	–	–	
Cully Rickard:		6-7			
Frank Price (No Conference) (1956–1957)
1956	Frank Price	5–5	–	–	
1957	Frank Price	6–10	–	–	
Frank Price:		11-15			
Dean Ehlers (No Conference) (1958–1961)
1958	Dean Ehlers	9–6	–	–	
1959	Dean Ehlers	5–15	–	–	
1960	Dean Ehlers	12–12	–	–	
1961	Dean Ehlers	13–6	–	–	
Dean Ehlers:		39-39			
Bob Stephenson (No Conference) (1962–1962)
1962	Bob Stephenson	13–5	–	–	
Bob Stephenson:		13-5			
Al Brown (Missouri Valley Conference) (1963–1971)
1963	Al Brown	17–6	–	–	
1964	Al Brown	21–5	–	–	
1965	Al Brown	21–7–2	–	–	
1966	Al Brown	18–10–1	–	–	
1967	Al Brown	15–14	5–2	2nd (East)	
1968	Al Brown	17–8	6–2	2nd (East)	
1969	Al Brown	20–12–1	3–3	3rd (East)	
1970	Al Brown	16–27	1–5	4th (East)	
1971	Al Brown	11–29–1	–	7th	
Al Brown:		158-127–5			
Bobby Kilpatrick (Missouri Valley Conference) (1972–1973)
1972	Bobby Kilpatrick	19–14	–	4th	
Bobby Kilpatrick (Metro Conference) (1973–1991)
1973	Bobby Kilpatrick	25–15	–	2nd	
1974	Bobby Kilpatrick	24–22	–	–	
1975	Bobby Kilpatrick	30–8	–	–	
1976	Bobby Kilpatrick	32–11	–	–	Regional Semifinal
1977	Bobby Kilpatrick	34–14	–	–	
1978	Bobby Kilpatrick	40–9	–	–	Regional Final
1979	Bobby Kilpatrick	25–15	–	–	
1980	Bobby Kilpatrick	31–15	–	–	
1981	Bobby Kilpatrick	48–11	–	–	Regional Final
1982	Bobby Kilpatrick	32–10	–	–	
1983	Bobby Kilpatrick	33–12	5–4	3rd (Southern)	
1984	Bobby Kilpatrick	26–15	3–5	3rd (Southern)	
1985	Bobby Kilpatrick	36–11	9–5	2nd	
1986	Bobby Kilpatrick	40–16	11–5	2nd	
1987	Bobby Kilpatrick	33–23–1	9–9	4th	
1988	Bobby Kilpatrick	27–22	6–8	5th	
1989	Bobby Kilpatrick	32–23	8–10	5th	
1990	Bobby Kilpatrick	31–25	7–12	5th	
1991	Bobby Kilpatrick	30–24	8–10	6th	
Bobby Kilpatrick (Great Midwest Conference) (1992–1993)
1992	Bobby Kilpatrick	25–26	7–10	2nd	
Bobby Kilpatrick:		653-341–1			
Jeff Hopkins (Great Midwest Conference) (1993–1995)
1993	Jeff Hopkins	42–15	15–3	1st	
1994	Jeff Hopkins	52–11	22–1	1st	Regional Semifinal
1995	Jeff Hopkins	32–28	12–11	3rd	
Jeff Hopkins (Conference USA) (1996–2000)
1996	Jeff Hopkins	26–28	9–11	6th	
1997	Jeff Hopkins	20–31	9–17	8th	
1998	Jeff Hopkins	24–31	12–15	T–6th	
1999	Jeff Hopkins	28–26–1	15–12	T–4th	
2000	Jeff Hopkins	15–37	8–18	9th	
Jeff Hopkins:		239-207–1			
Dave Anderson (Conference USA) (2001–2004)
2001	Dave Anderson	34–24	13–14	T–5th	
2002	Dave Anderson	20–31	10–20	8th	
2003	Dave Anderson	21–33	11–18	8th	
2004	Dave Anderson	29–28	15–14	6th	
Dave Anderson:		104-116			
Daron Schoenrock (Conference USA) (2005–2013)
2005	Daron Schoenrock	13–42	5–25	12th	
2006	Daron Schoenrock	32–28	13–11	T–4th	
2007	Daron Schoenrock	36–27	12–12	T–4th	Regional First Round
2008	Daron Schoenrock	17–38	5–18	9th	
2009	Daron Schoenrock	21–32	7–16	9th	
2010	Daron Schoenrock	28–30	12–12	T–3rd	
2011	Daron Schoenrock	30–27	12–12	T–4th	
2012	Daron Schoenrock	31–28	14–10	3rd	
2013	Daron Schoenrock	35–24	14–10	T–3rd	
Daron Schoenrock (American Athletic Conference) (2014–2022)
2014	Daron Schoenrock	30–29	8–16	8th	
2015	Daron Schoenrock	37–21	12–12	5th	
2016	Daron Schoenrock	22–39	9–15	6th	
2017	Daron Schoenrock	30–29	8–16	7th	
2018	Daron Schoenrock	20–36	5–19	9th	
2019	Daron Schoenrock	27–28	10–13	7th	
2020	Daron Schoenrock	10–7	–	6th	
2021	Daron Schoenrock	18–39	7–25	8th	
2022	Daron Schoenrock	26–29	9–15	T–6th	
Daron Schoenrock:		463-533			
Kerrick Jackson (American Athletic Conference) (2023)
2023	Kerrick Jackson	29–28	10–14	T–5th	
Kerrick Jackson:		29-28			
Matt Riser (American Athletic Conference) (2024–present)
2024	Matt Riser	23–32	10–17	10th	
Matt Riser:		23-32			
Total:		1,958-1,643-16			
National champion Postseason invitational champion Conference regular season champion Conference regular season and conference tournament champion Division regular season champion Division regular season and conference tournament champion Conference tournament champion

== Retired numbers ==
The Tigers have retired 14 numbers.

Number	Player	Position	Years at Memphis
1	Ron McNeely	OF	1974–76
5	Phil Clark	INF	1977–78
8	Dave Anderson	INF; Head Coach	1980–81; 2001–04
11	Tim Corder	RHP	1981–83
14	Mike Paxton	RHP	1972–75
16	Adam Amar	1B	2004–07
17	Jeff Hopkins	P Head Coach	1971–74; 1993–00
18	Mike Dlugach	C	1970–73
19	Charlie Lea	RHP	1978
21	Terry Pressgrove	OF	1977–78
25	Mark Little	OF	1993–94
47	Stan Bronson Jr.	Batboy	1958–2014
(Note: Numbers not assigned before 1970.)	Al Brown	P Head Coach	1947–48; 1954, 1963–71
(Note: Numbers not assigned to coach at time.)	Bobby Kilpatrick	Head coach	1972–92

== Tigers who have played in MLB ==
- Dave Anderson
- Jonathan Bowlan
- Andy Cook
- Ray Crone
- Brent Dlugach
- Phil Gagliano
- Hunter Goodman
- Jarrett Grube
- Jim Hardin
- Chad Harville
- Jim Hickman
- Craig House
- Charlie Lea
- Jon Leicester
- Mark Little
- Tim McCarver
- Sam Moll
- Ryan O'Malley
- Mike Paxton
- Cliff Politte
- Josh Stewart
- Dan Uggla
- Jacob Wilson
