= Southern Miss Golden Eagles baseball =

College baseball team

Southern Miss Golden Eagles
- 2026 Southern Miss Golden Eagles baseball team
- Founded: 1913
- University: University of Southern Mississippi
- Athletic director: Jeremy McClain
- Head coach: Christian Ostrander (3rd season)
- Conference: Sun Belt
- Location: Hattiesburg, Mississippi
- Home stadium: Pete Taylor Park (capacity: 4,300)
- Nickname: Golden Eagles
- Colors: Black and gold

College World Series appearances
- 2009

NCAA regional champions
- 2009, 2022, 2023

NCAA tournament appearances
- 1990, 1991, 1999, 2003, 2004, 2005, 2006, 2007, 2008, 2009, 2010, 2011, 2016, 2017, 2018, 2019, 2021, 2022, 2023, 2024, 2025, 2026

Conference tournament champions
- Conference USA: 2003, 2010, 2016, 2018, 2019; Sun Belt: 2023, 2024, 2026

Conference regular season champions
- Conference USA: 2003, 2011, 2013, 2017, 2018, 2022; Sun Belt: 2026

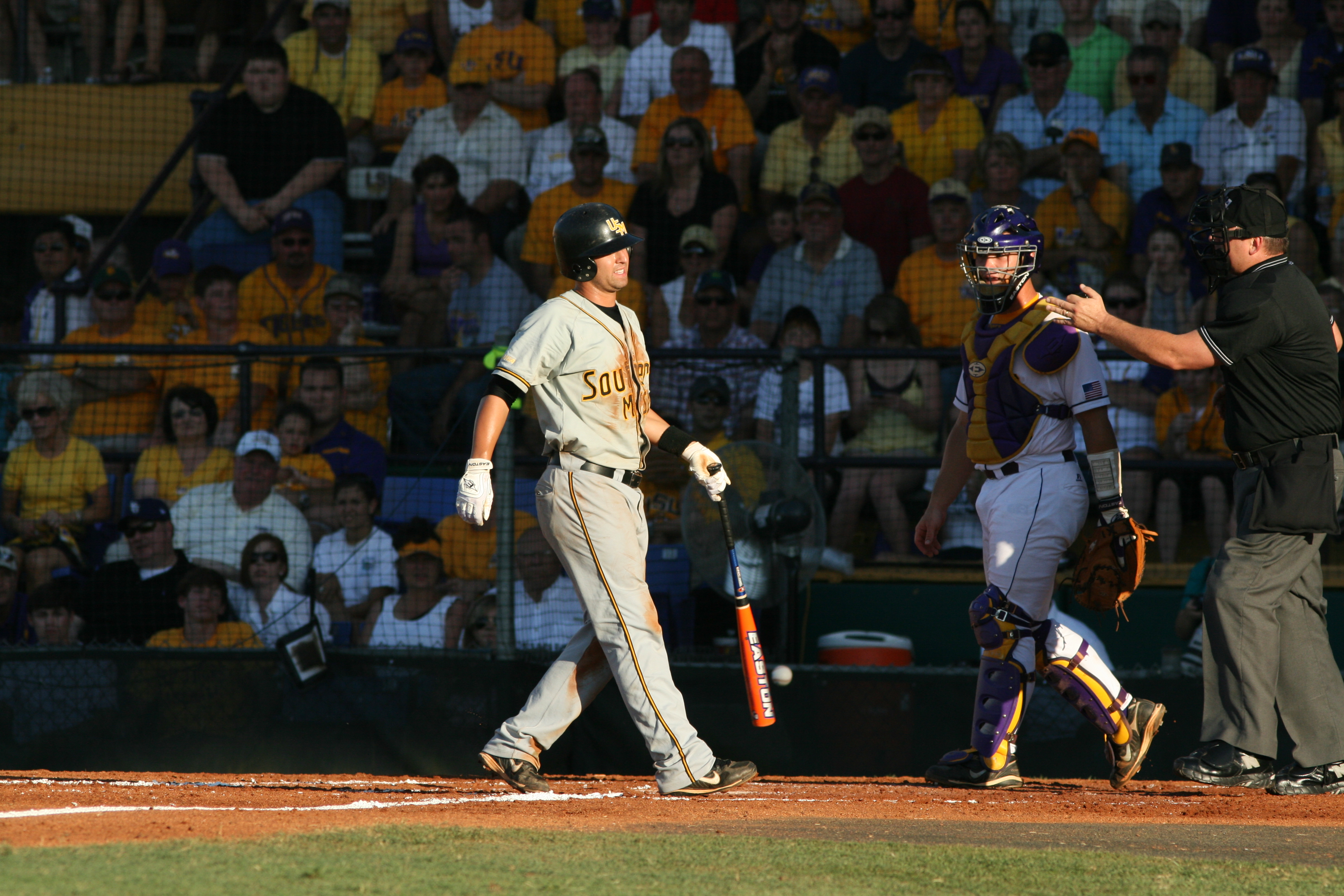
A moment from a 2008 game

The Southern Miss Golden Eagles baseball team represents the University of Southern Mississippi in NCAA Division I college baseball. They participate as a member of the Sun Belt Conference. The team has been to 22 NCAA Tournaments and served as an NCAA Regional host in 2003, 2017, 2022, 2025, 2026 and NCAA Super Regional host in 2022,2023. The Southern Miss baseball team has produced 19 All-Americans. and currently has 4 players on Major League rosters. Southern Miss has won seven Regular Season Championships (2003, 2011, 2013, 2017, 2018, 2022, 2026) and eight Tournament Championships (2003, 2010, 2016, 2018,2019,2023,2024,2026) and was the only team in CUSA to participate in every conference baseball tournament from the conference's inception until their departure following the 2022 season. During their inaugural season in The Sun Belt Conference, the Golden Eagles captured the SBC Tournament Championship. The Golden Eagles' rich history began in 1912 with a game against the Detroit Tigers, a contest which Southern Miss lost by a score of 24–2. The Golden Eagles play at Pete Taylor Park/Hill Denson Field on the campus of the University of Southern Mississippi and consistently rank in the top 10 nationally in NCAA attendance figures. During the 2023 season, Southern Miss "sold out" every seat for Pete Taylor Park including several hundred "standing room only" seats.

Southern Miss qualified for its first College World Series in 2009 after winning the Atlanta Regional and the Gainesville Super Regional. They would post an 0–2 record in Omaha, losing 7–6 against top-seeded Texas and 11–4 versus fourth-seeded North Carolina.

== Head coaches ==
Coach	Year(s)	Record	Pct
Herring	1913	1–3	.250
Ronald J. Slay	1914–1916, 1919	4–5	.444
O. V. Austin	1920–24	33–15–3	.687
William Herschel Bobo	1925–1928	19–10–1	.655
William B. Saunders	1929–1930	3–20	.130
Pooley Hubert	1934–1935	3–12	.200
Reed Green	1947	9–4	.692
Thad Vann	1948–1949	21–21	.500
Clyde Stuart	1950–1958	62–47–2	.567
Pete Taylor	1959–1983	320–349–2	.478
Hill Denson	1984–1997	468–386–2	.548
Corky Palmer	1998–2009	458–281	.619
Scott Berry	2010–2023	528–276–1	.656
Christian Ostrander	2024–present	90–36	.714

== Notable alumni ==
- John Bale – MLB Pitcher, Kansas City Royals
- Chad Bradford – MLB Pitcher, Baltimore Orioles
- Jim Davenport – MLB Infielder, San Francisco Giants
- Brian Dozier – MLB Infielder – Washington Nationals
- Jarrett Hoffpauir – MLB Infielder, San Diego Padres
- Pat Rapp – MLB Pitcher, Florida Marlins
- Kevin Young – MLB Infielder, Pittsburgh Pirates
- Nick Sandlin – MLB Pitcher, Cleveland Guardians
- Matt Wallner - MLB Outfielder, Minnesota Twins

== See also ==
- List of NCAA Division I baseball programs
