= 2011 ACC tournament =

2011 ACC tournament may refer to:

- 2011 ACC men's basketball tournament
- 2011 ACC women's basketball tournament
- 2011 ACC men's soccer tournament
- 2011 ACC women's soccer tournament
- 2011 Atlantic Coast Conference baseball tournament
- 2011 Atlantic Coast Conference softball tournament
