= 2011 Atlantic Coast Conference baseball tournament =

American college baseball tournament

- 2011 ACC baseball tournament logo
- Teams: 8
- Format: 2 division round robin and championship game
- Finals site: Durham Bulls Athletic Park; Durham, NC
- Champions: Virginia Cavaliers (3rd title)
- Winning coach: Brian O'Connor (2nd title)
- MVP: Steven Proscia (Virginia Cavaliers)
- Television: ACCRSN

2011 Atlantic Coast Conference baseball standings
	Conf.				Overall
Team	W		L	PCT	W		L	PCT
Atlantic
No. 9 Florida State ^{x}‍‍‍^{y}	19	–	11	.633	46	–	19	.708
No. 21 Clemson ‍‍‍^{y}	17	–	13	.567	43	–	20	.683
NC State ‍‍‍^{y}	15	–	15	.500	35	–	27	.565
Wake Forest ‍‍‍	15	–	15	.500	25	–	31	.446
Boston College ‍‍‍	7	–	22	.241	17	–	33	.340
Maryland ‍‍‍	5	–	25	.167	31	–	25	.554
Coastal
No. 3 Virginia ^{x}‍‍‡‍^{y}	22	–	8	.733	56	–	12	.824
No. 19 Georgia Tech ^{x}‍‍‍^{y}	22	–	8	.733	42	–	21	.667
No. 5 North Carolina ‍‍‍^{y}	20	–	10	.667	51	–	16	.761
No. 22 Miami ‍‍‍^{y}	19	–	10	.655	38	–	23	.623
Virginia Tech ‍‍‍	11	–	19	.367	30	–	25	.545
Duke ‍‍‍	7	–	23	.233	26	–	30	.464
x – Division champion ‡ – Tournament champion y – Invited to the NCAA tournament As of June 24, 2011; Rankings from Collegiate Baseball

The 2011 Atlantic Coast Conference baseball tournament was held at the Durham Bulls Athletic Park in Durham, North Carolina, from May 25 through 29. All of the games were shown live on Fox Sports South with select games being shown on Fox Sports Florida, Comcast Mid-Atlantic, Sun Sports, and New England Sports Network. Top seeded Virginia won the tournament and earned the Atlantic Coast Conference's automatic bid to the 2011 NCAA Division I baseball tournament. It was Virginia's third ACC tournament win and second in three years.

2011 was the fifth year in which the conference used a round-robin tournament format, with the team with the best record in each group at the end of the three-game round robin advancing to a one-game championship.

== Seeding ==
Atlantic Division
Team	W	L	Pct	GB	Seed
Florida State	19	11	.633	–	2
Clemson	17	13	.567	2	6
NC State	15	15	.500	4	7
Wake Forest	15	15	.500	4	8
Boston College	7	22	.241	12	
Maryland	5	25	.167	14	

Coastal Division
Team	W	L	Pct	GB	Seed
Virginia	22	8	.733	–	1
Georgia Tech	22	8	.733	–	3
North Carolina	20	10	.667	2	4
Miami	19	10	.655	3	5
Virginia Tech	11	19	.367	11	
Duke	7	23	.233	15	

== Tournament ==
	Division A	UVA	UNC	MIA	WF	Overall
1	Virginia (22–8)		W 3–2	W 6–4	W 13–1^{‡}	3–0
4	North Carolina (20–10)	L 2–3		L 5–7	W 9–0	1–2
5	Miami (19–10)	L 4–6	W 7–5		W 4–2	2–1
8	Wake Forest (15–15)	L 1–13^{‡}	L 0–9	L 2–4		0–3

	Division B	FSU	GT	CLEM	NCSU	Overall
2	Florida State (19–11)		W 4–2	W 6–3	L 0–7	2–1
3	Georgia Tech (22–8)	L 2–4		L 0–9	W 6–5	1–2
6	Clemson (17–13)	L 3–6	W 9–0		W 6–3	2–1
7	NC State (15–15)	W 7–0	L 5–6	L 3–6		1–2

Finals
A
B

Notes
† - Denotes extra innings
‡ - Denotes game shortened due to mercy rule

== Results ==
=== Division A ===
Wednesday, May 25 3:00 pm
Team	1	2	3	4	5	6	7	8	9	R	H	E
#8 Wake Forest	0	1	0	0	0	0	0	–	–	1	2	2
#1 Virginia	1	3	2	0	3	4	X	–	–	13	15	1
WP: Tyler Wilson LP: Brian Holmes; Home runs: WAKE: Mac Williamson; UVA: Steven Proscia, Keith Weman, David Coleman, Reed Gragnani; Attendance: 1,472; Notes: Game ended in the top of the seventh inning due to the Mercy rule. Boxscore

Thursday, May 26 11:00 am
Team	1	2	3	4	5	6	7	8	9	R	H	E
#5 Miami	0	0	0	0	0	4	2	0	1	7	14	1
#4 North Carolina	3	0	0	0	2	0	0	0	0	5	9	2
WP: AJ Salcines LP: R. C. Orlan Sv: Daniel Miranda; Attendance: 3,259; Boxscore

Friday, May 27 11:00 am
Team	1	2	3	4	5	6	7	8	9	R	H	E
#1 Virginia	0	0	1	0	0	2	3	0	0	6	15	2
#5 Miami	2	0	0	0	0	1	0	1	0	4	9	3
WP: Justin Thompson LP: Travis Miller Sv: Branden Kline; Home runs: UVA: None; MIA: Rony Rodriguez; Attendance: 4,419; Notes: Game was suspended in the bottom of the second for 7 hours due to a rain delay. Boxscore

Saturday, May 28 12:10 am
Team	1	2	3	4	5	6	7	8	9	R	H	E
#4 North Carolina	1	0	0	2	2	0	3	0	1	9	10	0
#8 Wake Forest	0	0	0	0	0	0	0	0	0	0	2	2
WP: Patrick Johnson LP: Tim Cooney; Home runs: UNC: Levi Michael, Jesse Wierzbicki, Greg Holt; WAKE: None; Attendance: 2,473; Notes: Game was suspended during the top of the 7 due to rain and was not resumed until Sunday afternoon, after the Clemson/NC State game

Saturday, May 28 6:00 pm
Team	1	2	3	4	5	6	7	8	9	R	H	E
#8 Wake Forest	0	0	0	0	0	1	1	0	0	2	6	0
#5 Miami	2	1	1	0	0	0	0	0	X	4	10	0
WP: E.J. Encinosa LP: Austin Stadler Sv: Daniel Miranda; Home runs: WAKE: None; MIA: Rony Rodriguez; Attendance: 2,982; Boxscore

Saturday, May 28 9:22 pm
Team	1	2	3	4	5	6	7	8	9	R	H	E
#4 North Carolina	0	0	1	0	0	1	0	0	0	2	8	0
#1 Virginia	0	0	1	0	1	0	1	0	X	3	7	0
WP: Whit Mayberry LP: Chris Munnelly Sv: Branden Kline; Attendance: 5,258; Boxscore

=== Division B ===
Wednesday, May 25 11:00 am
Team	1	2	3	4	5	6	7	8	9	R	H	E
#6 Clemson	0	0	0	3	0	0	1	0	5	9	13	0
#3 Georgia Tech	0	0	0	0	0	0	0	0	0	0	6	2
WP: Dominic Leone LP: Mark Pope Sv: David Haselden; Home runs: CLEM: Chris Epps; GT: None; Attendance: 1,571; Boxscore

Wednesday, May 25 7:00 pm
Team	1	2	3	4	5	6	7	8	9	R	H	E
#7 NC State	0	0	1	0	3	0	2	1	0	7	10	0
#2 Florida State	0	0	0	0	0	0	0	0	0	0	4	2
WP: Cory Mazzoni LP: Robert Benincasa; Home runs: NCSU: Matt Bergquist; FSU: None; Attendance: 3,947; Boxscore

Thursday, May 26 3:00 pm
Team	1	2	3	4	5	6	7	8	9	R	H	E
#2 Florida State	1	0	0	1	0	2	2	0	0	6	13	0
#6 Clemson	1	0	0	0	0	2	0	0	0	3	10	0
WP: Sean Gilmartin LP: Justin Sarratt Sv: Daniel Bennett; Home runs: FSU: James Ramsey; CLEM: None; Attendance: 2,416; Boxscore

Thursday, May 26 7:00 pm
Team	1	2	3	4	5	6	7	8	9	10	11	12	13	14	15	R	H	E
#3 Georgia Tech	1	0	0	0	0	3	0	1	0	0	0	0	0	0	1	6	15	2
#7 NC State	1	0	0	0	0	1	3	0	0	0	0	0	0	0	0	5	9	0
WP: Matt Grimes LP: Ethan Ogburn; Home runs: GT: Matt Skole; NCSU: None; Attendance: 3,098; Notes: Longest game in ACC Tournament history. (Surpassed in 2013); Boxscore

Saturday, May 29 9:00 am
Team	1	2	3	4	5	6	7	8	9	R	H	E
#3 Georgia Tech	0	0	0	0	0	0	2	0	0	2	7	2
#2 Florida State	0	0	3	1	0	0	0	0	X	4	7	2
WP: Mike McGee LP: Buck Farmer Sv: Daniel Bennett; Attendance: 2,196; Notes: Game was rescheduled from Friday afternoon to Saturday morning because of weather. Boxscore

Saturday, May 29 3:00 pm
Team	1	2	3	4	5	6	7	8	9	R	H	E
#6 Clemson	0	0	0	1	0	3	1	1	0	6	8	1
#7 NC State	0	2	0	1	0	0	0	0	0	3	8	0
WP: Matt Campbell LP: Nick Rice Sv: Scott Weismann; Home runs: CLEM: Brad Miller, Richie Shaffer, Chris Epps; NCSU: None; Attendance: 4,255; Boxscore

=== Championship final ===
Sunday, May 29 1:00 pm
Team	1	2	3	4	5	6	7	8	9	R	H	E
#2 Florida State	1	0	0	0	0	0	0	1	0	2	8	0
#1 Virginia	2	0	0	0	0	3	2	0	X	7	6	2
WP: Danny Hultzen LP: Hunter Scantling; Home runs: FSU: Justin Gonzalez; UVA: Chris Taylor, John Hicks, Steven Proscia; Attendance: 5,834; Boxscore

== All-Tournament Team ==
Position	Player	School
C	Rafael Lopez	Florida State
1B	Jesse Wierzbicki	North Carolina
2B	Zeke DeVoss	Miami
3B	Steven Proscia	Virginia
SS	Chris Taylor	Virginia
OF	Kenny Swab	Virginia
OF	James Ramsey	Florida State
OF	Chris Epps	Clemson
DH/UT	Mike McGee	Florida State
P	Cory Mazzoni	NC State
P	Patrick Johnson	North Carolina
MVP	Steven Proscia	Virginia

== See also ==
- College World Series
- NCAA Division I Baseball Championship
