= Brian O'Connor (baseball coach) =

American college baseball coach

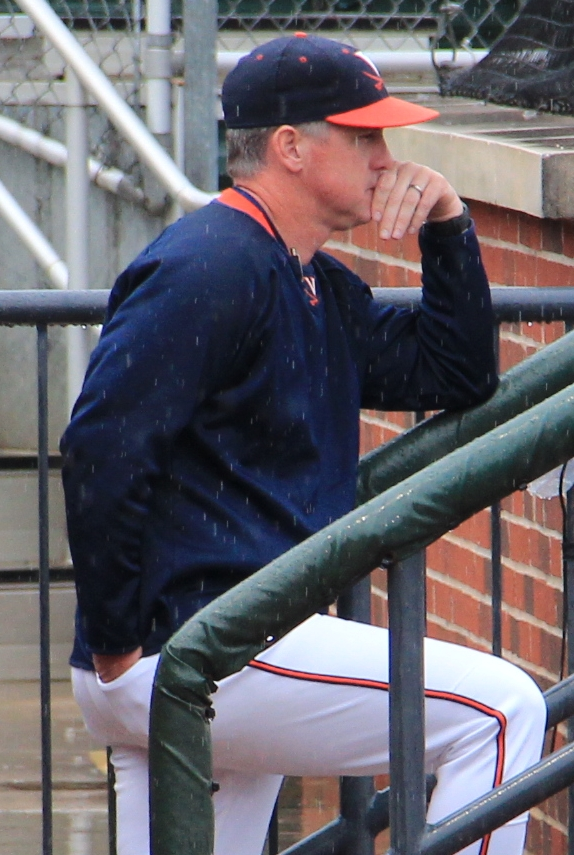

Current position
- Title: Head coach
- Team: Mississippi State
- Conference: SEC
- Record: 43–19 (.694)
- Annual salary: $2.9 million

Biographical details
- Born: April 21, 1971 (age 55); Omaha, Nebraska, U.S.

Playing career
- 1990–1993: Creighton
- Position: Pitcher

Coaching career (HC unless noted)
- 1993–1995: Creighton (pitching)
- 1995–2003: Notre Dame (asst.)
- 2004–2025: Virginia
- 2026–present: Mississippi State

Head coaching record
- Overall: 960–406–2 (.702)

Accomplishments and honors

Awards
- 5× ACC Coach of the Year (2004, 2010, 2011, 2013, 2014); ABCA, Baseball America National Assistant Coach of the Year (2001); AFLAC National Assistant Coach of the Year (2003); Atlantic Region Coach of the Year (2004); College Baseball Foundation Coach of the Year (2006); NCBWA, CollegeBaseballInsider.com National Coach of the Year (2009); Collegiate Baseball, Perfect Game National Coach of the Year (2015)

Brian Patrick O'Connor (born April 21, 1971) is an American college baseball head coach of the Mississippi State Bulldogs. He previously served as head coach of the Virginia Cavaliers from 2004 to 2025. O'Connor led the Cavaliers to fourteen NCAA baseball tournaments and seven College World Series Appearances during his time in Charlottesville, including the 2009 College World Series, the first in school history; the 2011 College World Series, as the No. 1 national seed; the 2014 College World Series, as the No. 3 national seed; and the 2015 College World Series, which they won and became National Champions for the first time in school history.

O'Connor is a native of Omaha, where the College World Series is held each year.

== Playing career ==
=== College ===
O'Connor graduated from Creighton University in 1993 where as a pitcher he posted a career record of 20–13 with seven saves and a 3.78 ERA. He was an integral starter in Creighton's 1991 College World Series team. To this day he carries on a close relationship with former pitching coach Todd Wenberg.

=== Minor league ===
O'Connor was selected in the 29th round of the Major League Baseball draft by the Philadelphia Phillies. He posted a 4–2 record with a 4.03 earned run average for the Martinsville Phillies of the Appalachian Class A League in 1993.

== Coaching ==
=== Creighton University ===
After his time with the Philadelphia Phillies organization, O'Connor rejoined his college team as their pitching coach from 1993 to 1995.

=== University of Notre Dame ===
At Notre Dame under head coach Paul Mainieri, O'Connor served as an assistant coach for the Fighting Irish from 1995 to 2001 before being promoted to associate head coach in 2001. He was named the 2001 National Assistant Coach of the Year by the American Baseball Coaches Association (ABCA) and Baseball America. Brian was also named the AFLAC National Assistant Coach of the Year in 2003. O'Connor worked with the Fighting Irish's pitchers and also served as the program's recruiting coordinator. Eleven years after playing in the College World Series, he was coaching in it for the Fighting Irish in the 2002 Series.

=== University of Virginia ===
==== 2004 ====
O'Connor was named the head baseball coach at Virginia on July 8, 2003. In his first season as head coach, he guided UVa to one of the most successful seasons ever in the history of the baseball program. He led the Cavaliers to a 44–15 overall record and an 18–6 mark in the ACC. The 18 wins were the most ever by a Cavalier team in league play at the time. For the first time in school history, Virginia hosted an NCAA Regional in its own backyard when Davenport Field at the UVa Baseball Stadium played host to the Charlottesville Regional. It was Virginia's fourth NCAA appearance in school history. O'Connor directed the Cavaliers to a second-place finish in the league in 2004. Virginia swept five three-game series over conference foes for the first time ever, including a three-game sweep over ACC-favorite Georgia Tech in Atlanta, Georgia., for the first time in school history. The Cavaliers also swept Clemson in three games for the first time in 32 years (since 1972).

==== 2005 ====
O'Connor followed up the 2004 season by going 41–20 overall and 14–14 in the ACC in 2005. As the No. 7 seed in the conference tournament, he led the Cavaliers to the championship knocking off three ranked opponents along the way including two wins over No. 12 Clemson and a win over No. 18 NC State. During the 2005 season, Virginia posted nine wins over ranked opponents including a three-game sweep of No. 4 Georgia Tech in Charlottesville, which was his second straight sweep of the Yellow Jackets during the regular season. The Cavaliers led the ACC in team ERA (2.74) for the second straight year.

==== 2006 ====
The Cavaliers topped the old school record for wins by winning 47 games on their way to a 47–15 mark. UVa also topped its record for conference wins going 21–9 in a tough ACC finishing third overall and just one game behind divisional champion, North Carolina. Virginia hosted the second NCAA Charlottesville Regional in 2006. Four players were named All-ACC led by Doolittle, who was the ACC Player of the Year. The result was the best regular season finish ever at Virginia by turning in a mark of 45–11 overall. The Cavaliers set a school record for best winning percentage in a single season (.758), ranked third nationally in team ERA (3.04) and 19th nationally in batting average (.322).

==== 2007 ====
Virginia went 19–9 in the ACC and 45–16 overall before losing to eventual national champions Oregon State in the NCAA regional at Davenport Field. The Cavaliers led the league in ERA for the fourth consecutive year at 2.81. Jacob Thompson has a league-best 1.50 ERA and was a consensus first-team All-American, while Sean Doolittle was a second-team All-American. Virginia had a number of impressive road wins, including wins over #1 North Carolina and their first-ever series win at Clemson.

==== 2009 ====
The Cavaliers went 49-15-1 in their '09 season and finished 6th in the ACC, before winning their first ACC tournament title since 1996, and the first under Coach O'Connor. O'Connor led Virginia to a sixth consecutive regional appearance, which they won and moved on to their first Super-Regional. They defeated the University of Mississippi at Oxford in three games, which brought the Cavaliers to their first College World Series in school history. They lost to LSU, defeated and eliminated Cal State Fullerton, and then lost to University of Arkansas in an extra-inning game. As a Council Bluffs native, O'Connor had the local crowd support at Rosenblatt Stadium. He was also voted 2009 National Coach of the Year.

==== 2010 ====
UVA went 51–14, setting a school record for wins, and finished 1st in the ACC Coastal. They earned their first national seed in program history (#5). O'Connor led Virginia to a seventh consecutive regional appearance, which they won and moved on to their second straight Super Regional, before losing to Oklahoma in 3 games. O'Connor won his first ACC Coach of the Year award since 2004.

==== 2011 ====
O'Connor led UVA to their best season to date, going 56–12, setting a school record for wins, and finishing 1st in the ACC Coastal, before winning his second tournament title in three years. The team earned their first number one overall national seed in program history. O'Connor led Virginia to an eight consecutive regional appearance, which they won and moved on to their third straight Super Regional, before beating UC-Irvine in 3 games, with a walk-off in game 3. The team fell in the semifinals of the CWS to eventual champion South Carolina. O'Connor won his third ACC Coach of the Year award. All-American pitcher Danny Hultzen was taken #2 overall in the draft.

==== 2012 ====
UVA went 39–19–1, just the second time under O'Connor that they failed to win 40+ games (2008), and finished 2nd in the ACC Coastal. O'Connor led Virginia to a ninth consecutive regional appearance, which they lost at home, with Oklahoma advancing to the Super Regionals.

==== 2013 ====
UVA went 50–12, winning 50 games from the 3rd time in 4 years, and finished 2nd in the ACC Coastal. They earned another national seed (#6). O'Connor led Virginia to a tenth consecutive regional appearance, which they won and moved on to the [Super Regional, before losing to eventual runner-up Mississippi State in 2 games. O'Connor won his fourth ACC Coach of the Year award.

==== 2014 ====
O'Connor led UVA to another banner season, going 53–16, winning 50 games for the fourth time, and finishing 2nd in the ACC Coastal. The team earned their fourth ever national seed in program history (#3). O'Connor led Virginia to an eleventh consecutive regional appearance, which they won and moved on to their second straight Super Regional, before beating long-time rival and Maryland in 3 games. His team went 3–0 in the CWS elimination rounds, before losing a hard-fought 3-game series to Vanderbilt and finishing runners-up for the first time in school history. O'Connor won his fifth ACC Coach of the Year award, while Nathan Kirby, Mike Papi, and Nick Howard earned All-American honors, and were 3 of the 8 Cavs named to the All-ACC team. 5 players were named to the CWS All-Tournament team.

==== 2015 ====
O'Connor's UVA team finally broke through and won it all a year after a runner-up finish, but took an interesting path to get there, going 44–24, and finishing 2nd in a down ACC Coastal (only 15-15). The team was plagued by injuries throughout the season, until finally getting healthy late in the season. This including the school's first ever road sweep of 3 games at North Carolina, to clinch a spot in the ACC Tourney. O'Connor led Virginia to a twelfth consecutive regional appearance, which they won (in California, like in 2009, but as a regional 3 seed this time) and moved on to their third straight Super Regional, and 6th in 7 years. Due to Maryland's upset of #1 UCLA in their regional, UVA and (now-B1G member) Maryland were matched up in the Supers in Charlottesville for the second straight seasons. Led by game-winning hits by the 8 hole-hitter in game 1 (3-run double in the 8th), and the 9-hole hitter in game 2 (a walk-off 2-run double), both off of the Terps' All-American closer, UVA went back to the CWS for the 4th time in history, all under O'Connor. Aided by a few lucky bounces against Florida, UVA made it back to the national title series, against Vandy again. Clutch hitting and pitching allowed UVA to upset the favored Commodores, winning their first ever title in baseball. They scored the go-ahead run in 5th inning or later in all 10 of their postseason wins. Nathan Kirby earned the 6-out save a year after imploding in game 1 of the CWS Finals. UVA placed 5 members on the All-Tournament team again, with pitcher Brandon Waddell repeating (complete game in game 2 of 2014, 7 innings in game 3 of 2015, allowing only 2 runs each time). Closer Josh Sborz was the MOP, after going 3–0 with a save in 4 CWS appearances, allowing 0 runs in 13 innings. During the entire tourney, he went 4–0, saved 3 games (in 8 appearances), and allowed only 1 unearned run in 19 innings. After the season, O'Connor was awarded National Coach of the Year Awards from Collegiate Baseball, Perfect Game, and Baseball America.

==== 2016 ====
On May 27, O'Connor won his 595th game as UVA's coach, 7–2 over Louisville in the ACC Tournament, setting the school record for career wins. He led UVA to its thirteenth consecutive regional appearance, and as a regional host for the eighth time in his thirteen seasons as UVA's coach.

=== Mississippi State University ===
==== 2025 ====
O'Connor was hired as the head coach at Mississippi State on June 1, 2025. He is the 19th head coach in the program's history.

== Head coaching record ==
Record table
Season	Team	Overall	Conference	Standing	Postseason
Virginia Cavaliers (Atlantic Coast Conference) (2004–2025)
2004	Virginia	44–15	18–6	2nd	NCAA Regional
2005	Virginia	41–20	14–14	7th	NCAA Regional
2006	Virginia	47–15	21–9	2nd (Coastal)	NCAA Regional
2007	Virginia	45–16	19–9	2nd (Coastal)	NCAA Regional
2008	Virginia	39–23	15–15	4th (Coastal)	NCAA Regional
2009	Virginia	49–15–1	16–11–1	4th (Coastal)	College World Series
2010	Virginia	51–14	23–7	1st (Coastal)	NCAA Super Regional
2011	Virginia	56–12	22–8	T–1st (Coastal)	College World Series
2012	Virginia	39–19–1	18–12	2nd (Coastal)	NCAA Regional
2013	Virginia	50–12	22–8	2nd (Coastal)	NCAA Super Regional
2014	Virginia	53–16	22–8	2nd (Coastal)	College World Series Runner-up
2015	Virginia	44–24	15–15	2nd (Coastal)	College World Series champions
2016	Virginia	38–22	19–11	2nd (Coastal)	NCAA Regional
2017	Virginia	43–16	18–12	2nd (Coastal)	NCAA Regional
2018	Virginia	29–25	12–18	5th (Coastal)	
2019	Virginia	32–24	14–16	5th (Coastal)	
2020	Virginia	14–4	2–1	(Coastal)	Season canceled due to COVID-19
2021	Virginia	36–27	18–18	T–3rd (Coastal)	College World Series
2022	Virginia	39–19	17–13	3rd (Coastal)	NCAA Regional
2023	Virginia	50–15	19–11	1st (Coastal)	College World Series
2024	Virginia	46–17	18–12	2nd (Coastal)	College World Series
2025	Virginia	32–18	16–11	6th	
Virginia:		917–388–2 (.702)	378–245–1 (.607)		
Mississippi State Bulldogs (Southeastern Conference) (2025–present)
2026	Mississippi State	43–19	16–14	8th	NCAA Super Regional
Mississippi State:		43–19–0 (.694)	16–14–0 (.533)		
Total:		960–407–2 (.702)			
National champion Postseason invitational champion Conference regular season champion Conference regular season and conference tournament champion Division regular season champion Division regular season and conference tournament champion Conference tournament champion

== Personal ==
O'Connor was born on April 21, 1971, in Omaha, Nebraska. He graduated high school in 1989 from Saint Albert H.S. in Council Bluffs, Iowa. He married the former Cindy Petratis of Council Bluffs, Iowa. The couple has three children: two daughters and a son.

== See also ==
- List of current NCAA Division I baseball coaches
