= NCAA Division I baseball tournament =

US collegiate sports tournament

NCAA Division I Baseball Championship
- Current season, competition or edition: 2026 NCAA Division I baseball tournament
- Sport: Baseball
- Founded: 1947; 79 years ago
- First season: 1947
- Organizing body: NCAA
- No. of teams: 64
- Country: United States
- Most recent champion: Oklahoma (3rd title)
- Most titles: Southern California (12)
- Broadcasters: ESPN; ESPN2
- Level on pyramid: 1
- Website: ncaa.com/baseball

The NCAA Division I Baseball Championship is held each year starting in late May through mid June and features 64 college baseball teams in the United States, culminating in the eight-team Men's College World Series (MCWS) at Charles Schwab Field Omaha in Omaha, Nebraska.

The tournament is unique in that it features four tiers of competition, alternating between double-elimination brackets and best-of-three series. In fact, throughout the entire 64-team tournament, a team can lose a total of four games and still be crowned champions.

== Format ==
During team selection, the top 16 of the 64-team field are given "national seeds". As in other NCAA tournaments, conference champions (usually determined by a tournament) receive automatic bids, and the selection committee fills the remaining spots.

The first round of the tournament, called Regionals, consists of 16 locations that include four teams, seeded 1 through 4, competing in a double-elimination bracket. The 16 national seeds are given the No. 1 seed in their assigned regional. The host sites are determined largely by merit – most national seeds host – but are also contested by bids from schools guaranteeing the NCAA a certain amount of revenue from that regional. Host teams traditionally have a large advantage, although the home team for each game is determined by rule, so the host school sometimes plays as the visiting team.

The regionals are paired together as in a typical 16-team bracket tournament; the regional containing the No. 1 national seed is paired with the regional containing the No. 16 national seed, that containing the No. 2 national seed with that containing the No. 15 national seed, and so forth. This creates the matchups for the second round of competition, the Super Regionals, which are a best-of-three series between the winners of each paired regional.

The Super Regionals are typically hosted by the higher national seed in the regional pairing. If that team does not advance, but the lower national seed advances, the Super Regional will be played at that team's field. If neither of the two advancing teams are national seeds, they will bid for hosting rights. Although one school hosts all three games, the teams split home-team status in the first two games, with the host school batting last in the opening game and first in game 2. If a third game is needed, a coin toss determines home-team status.

The eight Super Regional winners meet in Omaha, Nebraska, in the Men's College World Series. The MCWS mimics the earlier rounds, consisting of two double-elimination brackets of four teams each. Thereafter, the winners of each bracket meet in a best-of-three final. The winner of this final series wins the MCWS and is crowned the national champion. The school with the most national champions is USC with 12, though the Trojans have not won one since 1998, and have not appeared in the World Series at all since 2002. They are followed by LSU, with 8 national champions between 1991 and 2025.

== Team titles ==
The following table shows the total national championships won by school, as well a map of all champions.

Schools that have won the NCAA Championship
12 8 6 5 4 3 2 1

Team	#	Years won
USC	12	1948 1958 1961 1963 1968 1970 1971 1972 1973 1974 1978 1998
LSU	8	1991 1993 1996 1997 2000 2009 2023 2025
Texas	6	1949 1950 1975 1983 2002 2005
Arizona State	5	1965 1967 1969 1977 1981
Arizona	4	1976 1980 1986 2012
Cal State Fullerton	4	1979 1984 1995 2004
Miami (FL)	4	1982 1985 1999 2001
Minnesota	3	1956 1960 1964
Oklahoma	3	1951 1994 2026
Oregon State	3	2006 2007 2018
California	2	1947 1957
Michigan	2	1953 1962
South Carolina	2	2010 2011
Stanford	2	1987 1988
Vanderbilt	2	2014 2019
Coastal Carolina	1	2016
Florida	1	2017
Fresno State	1	2008
Georgia	1	1990
Holy Cross	1	1952
Mississippi State	1	2021
Missouri	1	1954
Ohio State	1	1966
Oklahoma State	1	1959
Ole Miss	1	2022
Pepperdine	1	1992
Rice	1	2003
Tennessee	1	2024
UCLA	1	2013
Virginia	1	2015
Wake Forest	1	1955
Wichita State	1	1989

== Appearances ==
Total Columns

- School refers to the current name and branding of the baseball team.
- Conference shows the conference as of the 2027 season.
- # Total appearances in the NCAA Tournament, not counting vacated appearances.
- 16 Finished in the top 16 of the tournament: top 2 in a District or Regional (1950 through 1998) or won a Regional (1999 to present). Prior to 1966, some Districts would just select a representative straight into the College World Series, so some years may not have 16 teams with this designation.
- WS Total appearances in the College World Series
- CH National championships

Table Entries

- CH National champion
- RU National Runner-up
- W3 W4 W5 W7 Played in the College World Series with the given placement. All World Series since 1950 have had 2 teams finish in 5th and two teams finish in 7th. Since 1988, all have had 2 teams finish in 3rd, but before then, some years would have separate 3rd and 4th place teams, depending on how the bracket played out.

1947 through 1974
The nation was divided into eight static districts, and each district sent one team to the College World Series, usually based on district tournaments of varying formats, including single- and double-elimination. Some formats allowed teams to pie for a place. Through 1965, districts would sometimes directly select a team to go to the College World Series, rather than holding a tournament. From 1947 through 1953, district tournaments, when held, were considered unofficial and are not recognized by the NCAA or reflected in the table below.

- D2 2nd place in District tournament
- D3 3rd place in District tournament
- D4 4th place in District tournament
- D• 5th or 6th place in District tournament
- P3 P5 P7 From 1947 to 1949, rather than the 8 district champions qualifying directly for the College World Series, the teams played in a playoff round before 2 or 4 teams advanced. The format of these tournaments was different in all 3 years. These teams are not considered to be College World Series participants despite finishing in the top 8.

1975 through 1998
Rather than strict geographical tournaments, teams were assigned to one of 8 balanced, loosely regional tournaments consisting of 4-team or 6-team double elimination brackets. Depending on how the tournament played out, there could be two teams tying for 3rd place, or separate 3rd and 4th place teams. Many 6-team brackets include a tie for 5th place.

- R2 2nd place in Regional tournament
- R3 3rd place in Regional tournament
- R4 4th place in Regional tournament
- R• 5th or 6th place in Regional tournament

From 1982 through 1987, the NCAA identified the top 5 teams (top 8 teams in 1987) and slotted them into separate Regionals. These teams are marked with a ⁰. Starting in 1988, all teams were seeded 1 through 6 within their Regionals, and those seeds are shown in superscript.

1999 to present
All regional tournaments consist of 4-team double elimination brackets, with distinct placements for every team. The 16 Regional winners faced off in Super Regionals, with 8 winners advancing to the College World Series.

- SR Lost in the Super Regionals
- R2 2nd place in Regional tournament
- R3 3rd place in Regional tournament
- R4 4th place in Regional tournament

All teams are seeded 1 through 4 within their Regionals. The top 8 1-seeds are shown with a ⁰, and the remaining teams are shown by their seed in superscript.

Two additional unusual circumstances are marked in the table:

- In 1958, BYU won its district tournament, but withdrew from the College World Series due to an unwillingness to play on Sundays. They are marked with a D1 and not credited with a College World Series appearance.
- Arizona State's participation in the 2007 tournament was later vacated by the NCAA. It is shown in the table with strikethrough, and not included in the school's total columns.

School	Conference (as of 2027)	#	16	WS	CH	47	48	49	50	51	52	53	54	55	56	57	58	59	60	61	62	63	64	65	66	67	68	69	70	71	72	73	74	75	76	77	78	79	80	81	82	83	84	85	86	87	88	89	90	91	92	93	94	95	96	97	98	99	00	01	02	03	04	05	06	07	08	09	10	11	12	13	14	15	16	17	18	19	21	22	23	24	25	26
USC	Big Ten	39	32	21	12		CH	W3		W3			D3	W7			CH		RU	CH		CH	W4		W3		CH		CH	CH	CH	CH	CH	R3		R2	CH						R4				⁴R2	³R•	²R2	¹R3		⁴R2	²R2	¹RU	¹R2	²R2	¹CH	²SR	¹W5	⁰W5	¹SR			²SR										²R2									³R2	²SR
LSU	SEC	37	27	20	8																													R3										R•	⁰W5	⁰W4		²W3	¹W3	¹CH	¹R3	¹CH	¹W7	²R3	¹CH	¹CH	¹W3	²SR	⁰CH	¹SR	¹SR	⁰W7	¹W7	¹R2			⁰W5	⁰CH	²R3		⁰SR	⁰W7	⁰R2	⁰W5	⁰SR	⁰RU	²R2	¹SR	³SR	²R2	⁰CH	²R2	⁰CH	
Texas	SEC	65	51	39	6	P3		CH	CH		W5	RU	D2			W5	D2		D3	W7	W3	W3		W7	W5	D2	W5	W4	W3	D2	W3	W3	W4	CH	R2			W4	R2	W3	⁰W3	⁰CH	⁰RU	RU	⁰R3	⁰W3	¹R2	¹RU	¹R2	¹R3	¹W3	¹W5	³R2	³R3	³R4			³R3	²W7	³R2	⁰CH	¹W3	⁰RU	¹CH	⁰R3	⁰R2	²R2	⁰RU	⁰SR	⁰W7			²W3	³R4		²R2	¹W7		⁰W3	¹W7	²SR	³R3	⁰R2	⁰W5
Arizona State	Big 12	42	27	21	5																		W5	CH		CH		CH			RU	RU		W3	W3	CH	RU			CH	⁰R2	W3	⁰W4			W7	¹RU	²R3	¹R2		⁴R•	¹W7	³W3			³R2	³RU		⁰R2	²R3	²R2	¹SR	⁰R3	²W3	²R3	~~⁰W5~~	⁰SR	⁰W3	⁰W7	¹SR		²R2	²R4	²R3	²R2			²R3	²R3				³R3	³R2
Miami (FL)	ACC	51	35	25	4																									D3		D2	RU	R2	R3	R2	W3	W7	W4	W5	CH	R2	W5	⁰CH	⁰W3	R•	¹W5	¹W5	¹R2	¹R•	¹W3	²R•	¹W5	¹W3	¹RU	¹W3	¹W5	⁰CH	¹SR	⁰CH	³SR	⁰W5	⁰W5	¹SR	²W5	²R3	⁰W5	²R2	¹SR	²R2	¹R4	²R3	¹R2	⁰W5	⁰W7			²R2	²R3	⁰R3	¹R2		³SR	²R3
Arizona	Big 12	40	27	19	4								W5	W4	RU	D2	W7	RU	W3	D2	D2	RU			W5				W7				D2	R4	CH		R2	W5	CH					W7	CH	R•		¹R2			¹R•	³R2						³R4				²R4	³W5	²R2		²R2	¹SR		³R3	²R2	¹CH				²RU	²R3			⁰W7	²R2	³R4	¹R4	²W7	
Cal State Fullerton	Big West	41	27	18	4																													W7	R2	R3	R3	CH	R3	R2	W7	R3	⁰CH			R2	³W3		³W7		³RU	²R3	²W3	¹CH	²R3	²R4	²R2	⁰W5	²R2	⁰W3	⁴R3	⁰W3	²CH	⁰SR	⁰W3	²W7	⁰SR	⁰W7	¹SR	¹R3	²R3	⁰SR	³R2	¹W7	²R3	²W7	³SR				³R3			
Oklahoma	SEC	42	17	12	3	P5				CH				D2	D3																W5	W5	W5	W4	W7	R3		R3			R3		R4	R3	R4	R•	²R•	²R4		³R•	³W5		¹CH	²W7		³R•	⁴R3		²R2		²R4		²R3	³R2	¹SR		³R2	⁰R2	¹W5	²R4	²SR	²SR				²R3	³R2			²RU	³R3	¹R2	²R2	²CH
Oregon State	Pac-12	25	13	8	3						W7										D2	D2																				R4		R4	R3																			⁰W7	¹CH	³CH		³R2	³R3	¹SR	²R2	⁰W3	⁰R2	²R3		⁰W3	⁰CH	¹R4	²R2	⁰SR	²R2	¹SR	⁰W5	²R2
Minnesota	Big Ten	32	8	5	3										CH		D4	D3	CH				CH				D3	D3	D4			W3	D2		R2	W5				R•	R3			R4		R•	⁶R•			⁵R4	⁵R3	⁴R•	⁴R3				⁵R•	²R2	²R3	⁴R4		²R3	³R4			³R3		²R2	⁴R2						²R2		¹SR							
Stanford	ACC	38	28	19	2							W5												D2		W3														R2	W5	⁰W5	R2	⁰W5	R2	⁰CH	²CH		¹W3	²R3	¹R3		⁴R•	³W5	²R3	¹W3	¹R4	⁰W3	⁰RU	⁰RU	⁰W3	⁰RU	⁰R2	³R2	³SR		¹W3		²R4	²SR	¹SR		³SR			⁰R2	⁰R2	¹SR	¹W5	⁰W7	⁰W7			
South Carolina	SEC	35	22	11	2																												D2	RU	R3	RU			R2	W4	W7	R•	R3	W7	R4		³R2				³R3	²R•					²R3		⁰SR	²SR	⁰RU	²W5	⁰W3	²R2	²SR	¹SR	²R2	²R2	¹CH	⁰CH	⁰RU	¹SR	¹R2		¹SR		²SR		²R3		¹SR	²R3		
Michigan	Big Ten	26	15	8	2							CH								D2	CH													R2	R2	R2	W5		W5	W7		⁰W3	W7	R2	R4	R4	⁴R3	³R2										⁴R2						³R3	³R3	²SR	²R3							³R2		³R4		³RU	³R4	³R2				
California	ACC	14	7	6	2	CH										CH																							W3					R4			²W7			⁴R2	⁴W7			³R4						³R3							³R4		²R4	³W5				³R2				²R4						
Vanderbilt	SEC	23	10	5	2																											D3	D4						R4																								²SR		²R2	⁰R2	²R3	³R2	²SR	⁰W3	²R2	⁰SR	¹CH	¹RU	¹R4	²SR	²SR	⁰CH	⁰RU	²R2	⁰R3	²R4	⁰R3	
Oklahoma State	Big 12	51	32	20	1		P5	P5					W4	W3				CH	W3	RU					RU	W7	W5	D2									R3			RU	⁰W5	W5	⁰W3	⁰W5	W4	⁰RU	¹R2	²R3	²RU	²R2	²R2	²W3	¹R2	²R2	³W7	³R2	⁵R3	²W7		³R2			²R3		¹R2	³SR	¹R2	³R2		²R4		³R2	¹SR	¹R3	²W3	³R4	³R2	¹SR	²R3	⁰R2	¹R4	¹R2	³R2	²R2
Florida	SEC	41	22	14	1												D2		D2		D3															R2		R3		R2	R4		R•	R2			¹W5	²R•		¹W3	¹R•		²R2		¹W3	²R3	¹W7		²R2	²R3	¹R2	³R2	¹SR	⁰RU			²R4	⁰SR	⁰W7	⁰RU	⁰W7	³R4	⁰R4	⁰W3	⁰W7	⁰CH	⁰W3	³R3	¹R4	¹R2	⁰RU	³W3	²R3	⁰R2
Mississippi State	SEC	40	23	12	1																			D3	D3				D2	W7							R2	W5		W5		R2	R2	⁰W3		R4	²R3	¹R2	²W5	²R3	²R3	³R•			³R4	²W5	⁴W5	³R2	¹SR	¹SR		¹R2	³R3	²R2	³R2	²W7				³SR	²R3	¹RU	²R2		⁰SR	²SR	²W3	⁰W5	⁰CH			²R2	³R2	¹SR
Ole Miss	SEC	27	14	7	1										W3								W7					W5			W7					R3																		²R2				³R3		²R3		²R3	¹R4	⁰SR	¹SR	¹SR	³R2	¹SR	²R3		³R2	²R3	¹W3	²R4	¹R4		⁰R2	¹SR	¹SR	³CH			¹R2	²W7
Rice	American	23	13	7	1																																																	³R2	³R2	²W7	¹R•	⁰W5	²R2	¹SR	⁰W7	⁰CH	⁰R2	²SR	⁰W3	⁰W3	⁰W7	¹SR	²R2	⁰R3	¹R3	²SR	¹R3	²R2	²R2	³R2								
Tennessee	SEC	16	11	7	1					RU																																										¹R•	¹R2	¹W3	²R2	²R4				²W3			²R3	¹W7														²R2	⁰W7	⁰SR	²W5	⁰CH	¹SR	²R4
Wichita State	American	28	10	7	1																																		R•	R3	⁰RU	R3		R2		R4	²W3	¹CH	²R4	¹RU	¹W7	³RU	³R•	²R4	¹W7	⁴R•	¹R•	¹R2	³R2		¹R3	³R2	²R2	³R2	³R2	¹SR	²SR	⁴R4				⁴R4												
Virginia	ACC	22	10	7	1																										D3													R3											²R2								¹R2	²R4	¹R3	¹R2	³R3	²W5	⁰SR	⁰W3	¹R3	⁰SR	⁰RU	³CH	¹R3	²R3			³W5	²R3	⁰W7	¹W7		²R3
Georgia	SEC	16	8	7	1																																									W7			²CH		³R•									⁰W7	²R2		¹W3		⁰W7		⁰RU	²R3		³R2							⁰R2	⁰R2		²R3		⁰SR	⁰R3	⁰W3
UCLA	Big Ten	27	13	6	1																							W7										R2							⁰R4	R2			⁴R3		⁴R2	³R3			⁴R2	¹W7		³R3	¹SR				³R2		²R3	²SR	²R2		⁰RU	¹R2	⁰W5	¹CH		⁰R2		³R4	²R2	⁰SR	²R2	²R2			¹W5	⁰R3
Missouri	SEC	22	8	6	1						RU		CH				RU				W7	W3	RU	D2											R3		R4		R3	R•							⁴R3			⁴R3					⁴R•							³R3	³R3	³R3	⁴SR	¹R2	²R3	²R3			⁴R3													
Fresno State	Pac-12	36	11	4	1								D2	D2				W3		D3	D3				D3	D2										R3		R3	R4	R3	⁰R3	R2	R3	R2			¹W7	²R3	⁵R4	⁴W5	⁴R•	⁴R2	⁴R•	³R•	⁵R4	⁴R2			⁴R4	³R2					²R2	⁴R2	⁴CH	⁴R4		²R4	⁴R3							³R2				⁴R4	⁴R4	
Ohio State	Big Ten	22	9	4	1					W7				D2										RU	CH	W7															R•									²R3	⁴R2	⁴R2	¹R•	⁴R•		⁵R•		¹SR		²R4	³R2	³SR		⁴R3		³R3		³R2							²R3		³R4	⁴R3						
Holy Cross	Patriot	13	6	4	1						CH		D3	D3			W3		D2		W5	W7		D2		D3											R4																																							⁴R3							⁴R4	⁴R4
Wake Forest	ACC	18	8	3	1			RU						CH							D2	D2														R2																					²R3	¹SR	²R2	¹R2	⁰R2					³R3									³R3	¹SR				²R3	⁰W3	²R4	²R2	²R3
Pepperdine	West Coast	28	10	2	1									D4		D2			D3														D2	R2	R3			W3			R2			R2	R2	⁰R3	⁵R2	⁴R•		³R•	³CH	³R4		⁴R3				¹R2		²R3		⁴R4	⁴R2	³R2	¹R2	³R4	²R2				²R2		³SR	⁴R2										
Coastal Carolina	Sun Belt	22	4	2	1																																													⁶R•										³R2	⁴R3	²R4	³R4	¹R2		¹R2	¹SR	²R3	⁰SR	³R3	³R3	³R4		²R3	²CH		¹R3	³R3		³R2	¹R2	³R2	¹RU	²R4
Florida State	ACC	62	40	24	—										D3	W7	D3	D2		D3	W4	W5		W5	D2	D3	D2		RU		D4			W7	R3		R4	R•	W7	R3	R4	⁰R3	R•	R3	⁰RU	⁰W5	²R3	¹W3	¹R2	¹W7	²W5	²R3	²W5	¹W5	¹W5	¹R2	¹W7	⁰RU	⁰W3	¹SR	⁰SR	⁰SR	¹SR	¹SR	²R2	⁰R2	⁰W7	¹SR	¹W5	⁰SR	⁰W3	⁰SR	⁰R4	¹SR	¹SR	¹W5	⁰R4	³W5	³R3	³R3		⁰W3	¹SR	¹R2
North Carolina	ACC	38	22	13	—		P5												W7				D2		W7			D2									W3				R•	R4	⁰R•					³W7	¹R3			²R2		³R3			³R2	³R3	²R2		²R2	²SR	²R2	²R3	¹RU	⁰RU	⁰W3	⁰W5	³R2	⁰W5	⁰R2	⁰W3	³R3			⁰R2	⁰W5	¹SR	³R3	¹SR	³R3	⁰W5	⁰SR	⁰RU
Clemson	ACC	47	23	12	—	P5							D3				W5	W5								D2								R4	W5	W5	R3	R2	W7	R4						R2	¹R3	²R2	²R4	¹W7	¹R•	²R3	¹R3	¹W7	¹W3	³R•	²R•	²SR	⁰W5	²SR	⁰W3	²R3	²R2	¹SR	⁰W5	²SR		¹SR	²W3	¹R2	²R2	²R3	³R4	³R4	⁰R2	¹R2	¹R2	³R3			⁰R3	⁰SR	¹R3	
Arkansas	SEC	37	15	12	—																											D4						RU	R4			R4		⁰W3	R4	⁰W5	⁴R•	¹W5	¹R•					⁴R•	⁴R•		⁴R4	¹R3			³SR	²R3	⁰W7	²R2	²R3	⁰R2	³R4	²W3	¹SR	²R2	²W3	²R2	²R2	²W7		¹R2	⁰RU	⁰W7	⁰SR	²W3	⁰R2	⁰R3	⁰W3	²R2
Northern Colorado	Summit	21	16	10	—		P7	P5			W7	W7	D2	W5	D2	W7	W5	W7	W7	W7	W7	D2	D3	D2	D4		D4						W5	R4	R4																																																	
Texas A&M	SEC	39	23	8	—					W5				D2				D2					W7											R3	R2	R4	R2						R3		R3	R2	¹R2	¹R2		²R3	³R2	¹W5		²R2		³R•	²R2	⁰W7				¹R2	²SR			¹SR	¹SR	²R3	²R2	¹W7	¹R3	²R2	³R2	¹SR	⁰SR	³W7	³R3	²R2		⁰W3	²R2	⁰RU		¹R2
Maine	America East	17	9	7	—																		W3											R2	W4				R3	W7	W3	W7	W7		W7				⁴R4	³R2		⁵R•									³R4			⁴R3	⁴R4					⁴R3											⁴R4			
St. John's	Big East	39	20	6	—			W4					D2		D2	D2			W5	D2	D3	D2	D3		W4	D2	W3				D4		D2	R3	R4	R2	W7	R2	W5	R2				R•	R2		⁵R•			⁴R4		⁵R2				⁵R•							³R3	³R2		³R3	³R3		³R2	³R3	³SR			⁴R2		³R4	³R3					³R3		⁴SR
Alabama	SEC	26	12	6	—				W5																		D4															RU			R3					²R2				²R2	¹W5	¹RU	²R2	⁰W3	²R2		⁰R2	²R3		²R2	⁰SR		³R3	²R4	²SR	³R2		²R3	²R2						³R3		¹SR	²R4	²R4	⁰W7
Auburn	SEC	26	12	6	—																	D4				W4									W7		R3									R3		⁴R3				⁴R•	²W7	¹R2		²W5	²R2	²SR	²R3	²R2	²R4	⁰R2		²R2					¹R2					³R3		³R2	²SR	²W7		¹W5	¹R4		⁰SR	⁰SR
Louisville	ACC	15	10	6	—																																																								³R4					³W5	³R4	¹SR	⁰R2		³R2	¹W7	¹W7	⁰SR	⁰SR	⁰W5	²R2	⁰W3		¹SR			²W3	
TCU	Big 12	20	9	6	—										D2																																						³R•										³R3	²R3	⁴R3	²R2	³R3	¹SR	¹W3	¹R3	²SR		⁰W5	⁰W3	¹W3	⁰W3		³R2	⁰R3	²R2	²W3		²R4	
Western Michigan	MAC	13	9	6	—						W3			RU		D3	W3	W5		W5	D2	W7			D2	D2																						⁴R4																											⁴R4							⁴R4		
UConn	Big East	25	12	5	—											W5	D2	W7	D3	D2		D3		W5			D2		D2		W5					R•		W7											⁵R•			⁵R•	⁶R•																²R3	²SR		⁴R3			³R3		²R2	²R2	²R3	³SR	²R3	³SR		
Southern Illinois	Missouri Valley	14	8	5	—																				D4	D3	RU	W7	D2	RU		D2	W3		R4	W3	R2			R3					R•				²R3																																			
Penn State	Big Ten	17	7	5	—						W3			D3	D3	RU	D3	W4			D3	W5				D3			D3	D3	D2	W7	D4	R3	R•																								³SR																									
NC State	ACC	36	9	4	—																						W3					D•	D•	R2											R4	R•	³R4		²R3	²R2	²R•	¹R3	²R3		³R•	³R3	⁴R3	³R4				¹SR	²R3	²R3	²R2	²R3	¹SR		³R4	³R3	¹SR	¹W5		²R2	¹R2	³R2	¹R2	²R4	²W3		³R3	¹W7	²R2	³R4
Washington State	Pac-12	17	9	4	—				RU						W7				D2	D2				W3	D2									R2	W5	R2	R4						R4			R3	²R3		⁴R3																			³R3	²R2															³R3
Long Beach State	Big West	21	8	4	—																								D3																			³W7		³W5	²R3	¹W3	²R3	²R2	²R•	⁴R3	³W3	²R2		²R4	²R2	¹SR	²SR	¹R3		¹R2	¹R3						²R2		³R2	¹SR								
Seton Hall	Big East	16	7	4	—																		W5					D3	D2	W7		D4	W7	W5	R2	R•		R•			R4		R2			R4													³R4	⁴R2										³R3														
Harvard	Ivy League	15	7	4	—																						W7			W5	D2	W7	W7				R•		R2			R2	R3													⁶R3	⁵R3	⁴R4			⁴R4			⁴R4														⁴R4						
Boston College	ACC	13	7	4	—			P5				W4		D3					W5	W3	D4	D3			D2	W5																																										³R3							³SR						²R2			²R3
Texas Tech	Big 12	17	6	4	—																																																	¹R2	²R3	¹R•	⁴R•	²R2	³R3	³R2	²R3		²R2										²W7		⁰W5	⁰R2	¹W5	⁰W3	⁰SR	³R2	³R2			
Lafayette	Patriot	10	6	4	—		P3					W3	W7	D3		D3	W7							W7	D2																								⁶R•																	⁴R4																		
Georgia Tech	ACC	37	11	3	—													D3												D2														R2	R2	⁰R•	²R3	³R4	⁴R•	³R3	²R3	¹R3	¹RU	⁴R•	²R2	¹R3	²R2		⁰SR	²R4	¹W5	⁰R4	⁰SR	⁰SR	⁰W7		²R2	¹R2	⁰R2	¹R2	²R2	²R2	³R3		²R2			⁰R2	²R2	²R2		³R2	²R3	⁰R2
Notre Dame	ACC	24	10	3	—			P5							D3	W3	D2	D2	D4			D3							D3																			⁵R4			⁴R2	⁴R2	⁴R2		⁵R4			²R3	³R2	¹R2	²W5	³R2	¹R2	³R2	³R4									²R3					¹SR	²W5				
Duke	ACC	12	9	3	—						W5	W5			D2	D2				W5																																																							³R4		²SR	³SR	²R3		²SR	²R3	²SR	
Baylor	Big 12	21	7	3	—		P3																													W7	W7													³R•		⁴R•					³R4	⁰SR	¹R4	²R2	²R2	¹SR		⁰W3	³R2	³R3		³R3	²R2	²R2	⁰SR					²R4	²R3	²R3						
Nebraska	Big Ten	20	5	3	—																																	R3	R2					R3														²R3	¹SR	⁰W7	¹W7	¹R2		⁰W5	⁰R4	³R2	¹R3						²R3		³R4	²R4		³R3	²R2			²R3	³R3	¹R3
Houston	Big 12	21	9	2	—							W7					D3		D2						D2	RU															R3			R4		R2			³R3							⁵R•		¹R2	⁰SR	³R4	¹SR	³SR			²R4		³R2						²SR	¹R3		¹R2	³R2							
Tulsa	defunct	7	7	2	—																							RU	D2	W3	D2	D2	D2	R2																																																		
Oral Roberts	Summit	31	6	2	—																											D3					W5		R•	R2	R4	R2		R3	R3	R2											⁶R4	⁴R4	³R3	⁴R4	⁴R2	⁴R4	²R2	³R2	³SR	³R4	³R2	²R2	⁴R3	⁴R2	⁴R3			³R4	⁴R4	⁴R3	⁴R4			⁴R4	⁴W5	⁴R4		
UMass	MAC	11	6	2	—								W5	D2	D3										D3	D2		W5		D2		D4					R•																	⁶R•	⁵R2																													
Bradley	Missouri Valley	7	6	2	—				W7						W3	D2		D2			D2						D2																																															²R3										
BYU	Big 12	16	5	2	—												D1				D4						W7			W5								R2	R3	R4		⁰R4		R3			³R•	⁴R•	⁵R4				⁶R2							³R4	⁴R2															³R3								
NYU	D3	5	5	2	—	P3									W7		D2										D2	W3																																																								
Tulane	American	23	4	2	—																																	R4			R3	R4			R2	R•	⁴R•				⁵R•		³R4		⁴R4		³R4	¹R2	²R3	⁰W5	³R3	²R3	³SR	⁰W5	²R2		³R2							³R3	²R2						⁴R4	⁴R3		
Temple	defunct	13	4	2	—													D3				D3					D3				W3	D2		R3	R3	W7	R2			R4		R3	R4																	⁴R4																								
UC Irvine	Big West	11	4	2	—																																																										²R4		³R4	²W3	²SR	⁰R2	³R2	³SR			³W5						²R2			²R2	²R2	
Eastern Michigan	MAC	7	4	2	—																													W5	RU		R3			R2	R2																					⁴R3					⁴R4																	
Springfield	D3	5	3	2	—					W5			D3	W7		D2				D3																																																																
Iowa State	defunct	3	3	2	—											W3													W5	D2																																																						
Georgia Southern	Sun Belt	15	2	2	—											D3																W5	D3					R3	R4							R3			⁵W7						³R4				⁴R4	⁴R3	⁴R3							²R4		⁴R4			⁴R3							¹R3				
Yale	Ivy League	7	2	2	—	RU	RU																																	R4											⁶R4	⁶R•																								³R2								⁴R4
West Virginia	Big 12	17	6	1	—									D2						D2	D4	D3	D4			D4															R2			R4		R•							⁵R4		⁵R3																					²R2		¹R3			²R3	³SR	²SR	¹W3
Oregon	Big Ten	13	6	1	—								W7										D2																																														³R2		⁰SR	⁰R2	²R2	³R3					¹R2	²R3	²SR	³SR	¹R4	¹SR
UT Rio Grande Valley	Southland	13	6	1	—																						D2		D2	W4	D2	D2	D3	R2	R4		R3	R4	R4			R3			R4																																							
Louisiana	Sun Belt	20	5	1	—																																										⁵R•		⁶R•	⁵R2	⁵R•					³R•	⁴R•	²SR	²W3		²R2			³R3		²R2			³R3			²R2	⁰SR	³SR	¹R2					³R3	³R3	²R2		³R2
Delaware	CUSA	16	5	1	—										D3				D2	D3									W7								R3	R2	R2		R3	R2									⁵R4				⁵R•		³R•	⁴R4	⁴R4	³R3																⁴R4								
Hawaii	Mountain West	13	5	1	—																															R4		R2	RU		R4		R3		R2	R4		⁴R•		²R2	²R2	⁵R4													³R2				³R2															
Missouri State	CUSA	13	4	1	—																																									R•								⁵R•	⁵R3	⁵R2		³R2			²R2	³W7									³R3			⁰SR		²SR	³R3			⁴R3				³R4
Ohio	MAC	12	4	1	—								D2		D2				D3					D3			D2	D4	W4	D3																				⁵R•						⁵R•																		⁴R4		⁴R4								
Washington	Big Ten	12	4	1	—													D2																																	⁶R3		⁵R2			⁴R2	³R3				³R2	³R2	²R2										²R2		³R3		³W7				³R3			
Santa Clara	West Coast	12	4	1	—													D3			RU						D3	D2	D2	D2	D3						R4										⁵R4						⁴R4			⁵R3																									⁴R3			
Kentucky	SEC	11	4	1	—																																										³R2					³R•													¹R2		³R2				²R2		²R2			¹SR					¹SR	⁰W5	³R2	³R2
Saint Louis	Atlantic 10	8	4	1	—																	D2	D2	W3	D2																																								⁴R4				⁴R4			⁴R4					⁴R4							
Ithaca	D3	5	4	1	—									D2				D2			W5		D2			D4																																																										
Southern Miss	Sun Belt	22	3	1	—																																												⁵R4	⁴R•								³R2				²R2	²R3	²R4	³R3	²R3	²R2	³W7	³R3	²R4					²R3	¹R2	²R3	³R2	²R2	¹SR	²SR	²R2	¹R2	¹R4
UC Santa Barbara	Big West	15	3	1	—																										D2											R2			R3	R•			⁵R•						⁴R•					²R3												³R3		¹R4	²W5			²R4	³R2	³R3		¹R2		²R2
LSU New Orleans	Southland	14	3	1	—																															R3		R3	R3	R3	R2		W5	R3		R3	³R•	⁶R2							⁵R3				²R3							⁴R3	³R3																	
Utah	Big 12	5	3	1	—					W4								D2	D2																																																	⁴R2							⁴R3									
Wyoming	defunct	5	3	1	—								D3	D2	W5					D2					D3																																																											
Cal State Los Angeles	D2	4	3	1	—																						D2					D2	D3			W4																																																
Rider	Metro	16	2	1	—																	D3		D3		W5																	R4	R3	R3	R2		⁶R•		⁵R•	⁶R•		⁶R•														⁴R4		⁴R4										⁴R4		⁴R3			⁴R4
Rutgers	Big Ten	15	2	1	—				W3																D3		D4		D4																R4		⁴R3		⁶R2	⁵R•		⁵R4					⁵R4	³R4	¹R3	²R2		³R3				²R3																		
Kent State	MAC	14	2	1	—																		D2																												⁴R4	³R3	³R•							⁴R2	⁴R4		⁴R3			⁴R4		⁴R3	⁴R4	³R2	³W5		⁴R4				³R3							
Indiana State	Missouri Valley	13	2	1	—																																	R4				R4	R3		W7	R4		⁵R3						⁵R4																	³R4		²R4					²R2	³R3		¹SR	²R2		
Princeton	Ivy League	12	2	1	—					W7														D2																				R4						⁶R•					⁶R•				⁴R4	⁴R3		⁴R4	⁴R3		⁴R4					⁴R4					⁴R4									
Northeastern	CAA	12	2	1	—																		D2		W7						D3	D3																					⁶R•			⁶R•						⁴R4															³R4		³R4		³R4		²R3	⁴R3
Kansas	Big 12	7	2	1	—																																															³W7	³R3												²R3			³R2					³R3										²R4	¹SR
Colgate	defunct	4	2	1	—									W5					D3						D4			D2																																																								
Murray State	Missouri Valley	4	2	1	—																													R4				R2																								⁴R4																					⁴W7	
New Hampshire	defunct	2	2	1	—										W5																		D2																																																			
The Citadel	Southern	14	1	1	—														D3															R4				R4			R3	R3							⁵W5				⁶R3	⁶R•			⁵R4	⁴R4		³R4			⁴R3						³R3															³R3
Creighton	Big East	12	1	1	—																											D4																	⁵R3	⁴W3	³R4							³R4	³R4					³R2		²R3				²R3	⁴R2							²R2					³R2	
Indiana	Big Ten	10	1	1	—																																																		⁶R4													⁴R4				¹W5	⁰R2	³R3		²R3	²R2	²R3			³R2	³R3		
Loyola Marymount	West Coast	9	1	1	—																											D3													W5		³R3	⁵R3	³R•								⁶R•	⁴R4	³R3																			³R2						
James Madison	Sun Belt	9	1	1	—																																		R3	R3		W7					⁴R•							⁴R•							³R3						⁴R3			³R2												³R2		
Troy	Sun Belt	9	1	1	—																																																	⁶R•		⁶R•									²R2	³R4				³R3		³R2					³R3				³R3			³W5
Dartmouth	Ivy League	7	1	1	—												D3									D3		D3	W5																	R•																						⁴R4	⁴R3															
Iowa	Big Ten	6	1	1	—																										W7			R4															³R•																									²R2		⁴R3					²R2			
Stony Brook	CAA	6	1	1	—																																																										⁴R4				⁴R4		⁴R3		⁴W7			³R3				⁴R4						
Michigan State	Big Ten	5	1	1	—								W3																	D4							R4	R3																																	³R4													
San Jose State	Mountain West	5	1	1	—									D3																D3																													³W7		³R4																				⁴R4			
Rollins	D2	2	1	1	—								RU	D3																																																																						
Wisconsin	defunct	1	1	1	—				W4																																																																											
Tufts	D3	1	1	1	—				W5																																																																											
Colorado State	defunct	1	1	1	—				W7																																																																											
Syracuse	defunct	1	1	1	—															W3																																																																
East Carolina	American	36	7	—	—																		D3		D4		D3		D4				D•			R4			R4		R3		R3			R•		⁵R•	³R4	⁶R4		⁵R3						¹R2	¹R2	⁰SR	²R2	³R3	¹SR	³R4		²R3	²R2	¹SR		²R2	²R3			²R4	³SR		¹R3	¹SR	¹SR	⁰SR	²R2	¹R2	³R2	³R2
South Alabama	Sun Belt	28	7	—	—																										D2	D•		R3		R3			R4			R4	R2			R2		³R3	³R2	⁴R4	²R•	⁵R2		³R•	³R•	²R2	⁴R2	²R3	⁴R4	¹R3	¹R3	²R2		³R4	³R3							²R3			³R2	³R3			³R2					
Illinois	Big Ten	13	5	—	—	P5	P7														D3	D2																										³R4	³R3								⁵R2		³R3											⁴R2		³R3		⁰SR				²R4				³R3		
Denver	defunct	6	4	—	—	P5										D2								D3			D3		D2			D2																																																				
Stetson	ASUN	20	3	—	—																																				R2		R4				⁵R2	⁵R4	⁶R•		⁶R•				⁴R3	⁴R•			³R2	³R2	⁴R4	⁴R2		⁴R4	⁴R4	³R3				²R2					⁴R4		¹SR					⁴R3	³R3	
San Diego State	Pac-12	14	3	—	—																																	R2		R4	R4	R3	R2		R•				³R2	⁵R•																		³R3				⁴R4	³R4	⁴R3		⁴R3	³R4							
Gonzaga	Pac-12	12	3	—	—																									D2		D3	D3		R4		R2		R2	R4																												³R3							³R3		³R3		²R3	²R3				
Idaho	defunct	3	3	—	—																				D2	D2		D2																																																								
Central Michigan	MAC	15	2	—	—																										D3					R3			R4	R3			R2	R•	R2	R4	³R3		⁴R•				⁵R•	⁵R4																								³R3	⁴R2	⁴R3				
VCU	Atlantic 10	15	2	—	—																																										⁵R•				⁶R2						³R3	³R3		²R2	⁴R4	²R3		⁴R4		⁴R4			⁴R4					⁴SR					²R3	³R2		³R3		⁴R3
Lamar	Southland	14	2	—	—																														R4	R4		R3		R3			R2	R2		R•						⁴R•		⁵R3							³R3	³R2	³R4						⁴R4															⁴R4
South Florida	American	14	2	—	—																																				R3				R2			³R•	⁴R•			⁵R•		⁴R•	⁴R3	⁴R3				³R3	³R2													³R3		²R3	²R3		⁴SR					
Dallas Baptist	Pac-12	14	2	—	—																																																														²R4			³SR	²R2		²R4	¹R2	²R2	³R2	³R2	²R2	³SR	³R4	²R2	²R3	²R3	
Virginia Tech	ACC	12	2	—	—								D2															D3							R4	R4																	⁵R•			⁵R4		³R3	⁴R4										²R2			¹R2								⁰SR				²R4
Providence	defunct	9	2	—	—																	D2					D4		D3		D4	D2	D3																		⁶R3			⁶R•				²R2																										
Maryland	Big Ten	9	2	—	—																			D4					D3	D4																																											²SR	³SR		³R3			³R2	¹R2	²R3			
Cincinnati	Big 12	8	2	—	—										D3					D3						D2				D2			D4																																													⁴R3					³R3	²R3
Air Force	Mountain West	7	2	—	—															D3	D2		D2		D3	D3		D3																																																				⁴R2				
Charleston	CAA	7	2	—	—																																																										³R2	²R3	²SR				²R2		³R3		⁴SR	²R2										
Cal State Northridge	Big West	6	2	—	—																			D3																										³R2	³R4	²R3			⁵R2						²R3																							
Kansas State	Big 12	6	2	—	—																																																															²R2	³R3	³R4		¹SR										³SR	³R3	
Detroit Mercy	defunct	5	2	—	—													D4	D2	D4	D4			D2																																																												
Furman	defunct	5	2	—	—																			D2				D4							R2															⁶R4														⁴R4																				
Memphis	American	5	2	—	—																														R3		R2			R2													⁴R3													³R4																		
Boston University	defunct	4	2	—	—								D2		D3												D3	D2																																																								
Northern Iowa	defunct	3	2	—	—												D2			D2																																								⁴R3																								
Weber State	defunct	3	2	—	—																						D2		D3		D2																																																					
Vermont	defunct	2	2	—	—										D2						D2																																																															
Jacksonville	ASUN	15	1	—	—																										D•				R2													²R4		³R•			⁴R3	³R•				³R3		³R3		⁴R4			³R3	⁴R4		³R3		³R3							²R3		⁴R4					
Middle Tennessee	CUSA	13	1	—	—																														R4					R4	R2					R•	⁶R•		⁴R•	⁶R•				⁶R4					⁴R2	³R4		⁴R4	⁴R4					²R3																
Western Carolina	Southern	12	1	—	—																																							R3	R•	R3	⁵R•	⁶R•			⁵R2	⁶R4	⁴R•			⁵R4						³R2				³R2									⁴R3									
Sam Houston	CUSA	12	1	—	—																																									R3		⁵R•							⁶R•											⁴R2	⁴R4	⁴R4			³R2	³R3	³R2		³R3	³SR					³R3			
Florida Atlantic	American	12	1	—	—																																																					²R2	²R3		³SR	²R3	³R2	³R3					²R2			²R2		²R2	²R3		³R2	²R3						
UNLV	Mountain West	11	1	—	—																																R3		R2	R4			R3				⁴R3	⁵R4							³R•							²R2	⁴R4	⁴R3									²R3											
FIU	CUSA	11	1	—	—																																													⁵R•				⁵R4		⁴R•	⁵R4	³R3	³R2	³SR	²R4								³R4	²R4				⁴R3										
Louisiana Tech	Sun Belt	10	1	—	—																												D2	R4			R4		R3						R3	R3																													³R2				¹R2	²R3		²R4		
Navy	Patriot	9	1	—	—								D3																									R4			R2				R•									⁶R•				⁴R4			³R3									⁴R4					⁴R3									
Richmond	Atlantic 10	8	1	—	—																										D•														R•									⁴R4		⁶R4	⁴R•	²R2			²SR	²R2																						
Miami (OH)	MAC	8	1	—	—																											D3	D3			R2		R4				R3																	⁴R3					³R3																			⁴R4	
Villanova	Big East	6	1	—	—								D3				D3		D3	D3																												⁶R2		⁴R•																																		
Tennessee Tech	Southern	6	1	—	—										D3																																									⁶R4				⁴R3								⁴R3								⁴R3	²SR							
Portland	West Coast	5	1	—	—											D3	D2																					R4										⁶R•		⁶R3																																		
East Tennessee State	Southern	5	1	—	—																																R4		R3	R2																																⁴R4											³R4	
Western Kentucky	CUSA	5	1	—	—																																		R2																								⁴R3				⁴R4	³R2															³R4	
Cal Poly	Big West	5	1	—	—																																																															³R4				²R3	¹R2										³R2	³SR
North Dakota State	Summit	4	1	—	—										D2																																																										⁴R4						⁴R3				⁴R3	
Ball State	MAC	4	1	—	—																			D4				D2																																					⁴R3																⁴R4			
Bowling Green	MAC	4	1	—	—																										D2																										⁶R•	⁴R4														⁴R4												
Morehead State	Ohio Valley	4	1	—	—																															R4						R2																																⁴R4			⁴R4							
Evansville	Missouri Valley	4	1	—	—																																										⁶R•												³R3						³R2																	⁴SR		
Le Moyne	NEC	4	1	—	—																																											⁶R2														⁴R4	⁴R4			⁴R4																		
UTSA	American	4	1	—	—																																																⁵R•											⁴R4								⁴R4											²SR	
Trinity (TX)	D3	3	1	—	—																							D2			D3	D3																																																				
Little Rock	UAC	3	1	—	—																																																																	⁴R4													⁴R2	⁴SR
La Salle	Atlantic 10	2	1	—	—																		D3																					R2																																								
Saint Joseph's	Atlantic 10	2	1	—	—																									D2			D3																																																			
Marshall	Sun Belt	2	1	—	—																											D4					R2																																															
Kennesaw State	CUSA	2	1	—	—																																																																				³SR							³R3				
Northwestern	Big Ten	1	1	—	—											D2																																																																				
Gettysburg	D3	1	1	—	—																D2																																																															
Oklahoma City	NAIA	1	1	—	—																																						R2																																									
Davidson	Atlantic 10	1	1	—	—																																																																							⁴SR								
Bethune–Cookman	SWAC	17	—	—	—																																																					⁴R4	⁴R4	⁴R4	⁴R3	⁴R4	⁴R4		⁴R4	⁴R4	⁴R4	⁴R4	⁴R4	⁴R4	⁴R4		⁴R3		⁴R4	³R2							⁴R4	
UCF	Big 12	14	—	—	—																																											⁴R3				⁶R4		⁴R4	²R4	³R•			²R2	¹R2	²R3		³R2							²R3	²R2					²R4						³R2		²R3
Army	Patriot	12	—	—	—																																																						⁴R4				⁴R4	⁴R3				⁴R2			⁴R4	⁴R4					⁴R3	⁴R4	⁴R4	⁴R4	⁴R4	⁴R4		
UNC Wilmington	CAA	12	—	—	—																																																									³R2	³R2		³R3		²R2				³R3	²R3		²R2	²R2		⁴R2	⁴R4			³R4	²R3		
Wright State	Horizon	11	—	—	—																																																⁵R4												⁴R4			⁴R4		⁴R4				³R2	³R2		⁴R4		⁴R4	⁴R4	⁴R4		⁴R2	
Southern	SWAC	10	—	—	—																																									R•	⁶R•											⁴R3		⁴R4	⁴R4	³R3		⁴R4				⁴R4										⁴R4	⁴R4					
San Diego	West Coast	10	—	—	—																																																								³R3	⁴R3			³R3	⁰R4	²R2		²R3		²R4	³R2								³R3		²R3		
Old Dominion	Sun Belt	9	—	—	—																																				R•			R•					⁴R•				³R•	⁵R3	⁴R•				²R4														³R4						¹R2					
Liberty	CUSA	9	—	—	—																																															⁶R•					⁶R•		⁴R3													³R2	³R4					³R3	³R2	³R4				³R2
Central Connecticut	NEC	9	—	—	—																																																								⁴R4	⁴R4	⁴R4						⁴R4							⁴R4		⁴R3	⁴R4		⁴R4		⁴R4	
Columbia	Ivy League	8	—	—	—																														R•																																⁴R4					⁴R3	³R4	³R2			⁴R4			³R2			⁴R3	
George Mason	Atlantic 10	8	—	—	—																																							R•			⁶R•				⁵R4	⁶R•											³R4					³R4					⁴R4								⁴R2			
George Washington	Atlantic 10	7	—	—	—											D4	D4	D4																				R4										⁵R•			⁶R•										⁴R4																							
Valparaiso	Missouri Valley	7	—	—	—												D3					D4			D3	D4	D4																																												⁴R4	⁴R3												
Penn	Ivy League	7	—	—	—																													R4													⁵R4	⁴R•	⁶R4					⁶R•																											⁴R2	⁴R4		
Campbell	CAA	7	—	—	—																																												⁶R•																								⁴R3				⁴R4	³R2	³R2	³R3	²R2			
Charlotte	American	7	—	—	—																																															⁶R•					⁵R•									³R2	³R4			³R3									²R3		³R2			
Marist	Metro	7	—	—	—																																																			⁶R•			⁴R3	⁴R3	³R3			⁴R4				⁴R4								⁴R4								
Texas State	Pac-12	7	—	—	—																																																			⁶R3		⁴R4	⁴R3									²R4		²R3										²R2				³R3
UIC	Missouri Valley	7	—	—	—																																																									⁴R4		⁴R4		⁴R3	⁴R3									⁴R4		⁴R4						⁴R4
Binghamton	America East	7	—	—	—																																																															⁴R3				⁴R4	⁴R4		⁴R4					⁴R4			⁴R4	⁴R4
New Mexico	Mountain West	6	—	—	—																D3																																																³R3	⁴R4	³R3	³R4			³R3									
Jackson State	SWAC	6	—	—	—																																				R4				R•			⁶R•											⁴R4													⁴R4	⁴R3											
Fordham	Atlantic 10	6	—	—	—																																									R3	⁶R•		⁶R•			⁶R3					⁶R•																					⁴R4						
McNeese	Southland	6	—	—	—																																										⁶R4					⁶R4							³R4			⁴R4																³R4	⁴R4					
Southeastern Louisiana	Southland	6	—	—	—																																														⁵R4		⁶R•																				⁴R3		³R3	²R3				⁴R4				
Austin Peay	UAC	6	—	—	—																																																		⁶R•									⁴R4		⁴R3				⁴R3	⁴R2	²R2												
Bucknell	Patriot	6	—	—	—																																																		⁶R•					⁴R4		⁴R4					⁴R3		⁴R4				⁴R3											
Southeast Missouri State	Ohio Valley	6	—	—	—																																																				⁶R•				⁴R3														⁴R4				⁴R4	⁴R4		⁴R2		
Elon	CAA	6	—	—	—																																																								³R4				²R3		³R3	²R3	³R4			³R2												
Jacksonville State	CUSA	6	—	—	—																																																										⁴R4		⁴R4				⁴R4				⁴R4					⁴R2						³R2
Grambling State	SWAC	5	—	—	—																																					R•	R4	R•																									⁴R4													⁴R4		
LIU	NEC	5	—	—	—																										D3																																														⁴R4			⁴R4		⁴R4		⁴R4
Louisiana–Monroe	Sun Belt	5	—	—	—																																					R•												⁶R•				³R4	³R2												⁴R3													
Nicholls	Southland	5	—	—	—																																											⁴R•			⁵R•						⁶R•																								⁴R4	³R4		
UT Arlington	UAC	5	—	—	—																																												⁶R•		⁴R•									⁴R3					⁴R4						³R4													
Nevada	Mountain West	5	—	—	—																																																²R4			⁴R3		²R2	³R3																				³R4					
Winthrop	Big South	5	—	—	—																																																	⁵R3				⁴R3		²R2				²R3	²R2																			
Milwaukee	Horizon	5	—	—	—																																																					⁴R3		⁴R4	⁴R4								⁴R4															⁴R2
New Mexico State	CUSA	5	—	—	—																																																								⁴R4	³R3									²R4						⁴R4			⁴R4				
Texas Southern	SWAC	5	—	—	—																																																										⁴R3				⁴R4							⁴R4		⁴R4	⁴R4							
Xavier	Big East	5	—	—	—																																																															³R3					⁴R3		⁴R2	³R2					³R2			
Manhattan	Metro	4	—	—	—											D3																																																	⁴R2					⁴R4	⁴R4													
Appalachian State	Sun Belt	4	—	—	—																											D4											R•		R•																										³R2													
Illinois State	Missouri Valley	4	—	—	—																														R3																		⁶R•																³R3									³R2						
William & Mary	CAA	4	—	—	—																																					R•																		³R4												³R2			⁴R2									
Eastern Kentucky	UAC	4	—	—	—																																						R4	R4	R•			⁶R•																																				
Northwestern State	Southland	4	—	—	—																																													⁶R•			⁵R4											³R3													⁴R3							
UNC Greensboro	Southern	4	—	—	—																																																⁵R3			⁶R4																				⁴R3				⁴R4				
Monmouth	CAA	4	—	—	—																																																				⁶R•	⁴R4								⁴R4		⁴R4																
Sacred Heart	Metro	4	—	—	—																																																												⁴R4					⁴R4	⁴R4			⁴R4										
Lipscomb	ASUN	4	—	—	—																																																														⁴R3							⁴R4							⁴R4			⁴R4
Mercer	Southern	4	—	—	—																																																																⁴R3			³R4		⁴R4				⁴R4						
Samford	Southern	4	—	—	—																																																																		³R2						⁴R3		⁴R4		³R3			
Bryant	America East	4	—	—	—																																																																			³R3	³R4		²R4							⁴R4		
Canisius	Metro	4	—	—	—																																																																			⁴R4		⁴R4			⁴R4			⁴R4				
Colby	D2	3	—	—	—												D3			D4					D3																																																											
Pittsburgh	ACC	3	—	—	—													D3						D3																														⁵R3																														
Purdue	Big Ten	3	—	—	—																																									R•																									¹R3						²R3							
Towson	CAA	3	—	—	—																																										⁶R4			⁵R4																						³R3												
UMBC	America East	3	—	—	—																																														⁶R•									⁴R4																⁴R4								
Eastern Illinois	Ohio Valley	3	—	—	—																																																					⁴R3									⁴R4														⁴R4			
Rhode Island	Atlantic 10	3	—	—	—																																																											⁴R4											⁴R3								³R4	
San Francisco	West Coast	3	—	—	—																																																												³R3					⁴R3		³R3												
Prairie View A&M	SWAC	3	—	—	—																																																												⁴R4	⁴R4					⁴R4													
Sacramento State	Big West	3	—	—	—																																																																				⁴R3			⁴R4		⁴R3						
Florida A&M	SWAC	3	—	—	—																																																																					⁴R4				⁴R4			⁴R4			
Saint Mary's	West Coast	3	—	—	—																																																																						³R4								⁴R3	⁴R2
Alabama State	SWAC	3	—	—	—																																																																						⁴R4					⁴R4				⁴R4
Fairfield	Metro	3	—	—	—																																																																						⁴R4				³R2				⁴R4	
Grand Canyon	Mountain West	3	—	—	—																																																																										⁴R4	³R4		⁴R2		
Alma	D3	2	—	—	—									D3		D4																																																																				
Cal Poly Pomona	D2	2	—	—	—																		D3		D4																																																											
Arkansas State	Sun Belt	2	—	—	—																								D3																								⁶R3																															
Buffalo	defunct	2	—	—	—																									D4		D3																																																				
Northern Illinois	Horizon	2	—	—	—																										D4																																																					³R3
Cornell	Ivy League	2	—	—	—																															R3																																			⁴R4													
UAB	American	2	—	—	—																																													⁶R4																					⁴R4													
Siena	Metro	2	—	—	—																																																					⁴R4															⁴R3											
UC Riverside	Big West	2	—	—	—																																																									³R3				²R3																		
Youngstown State	Horizon	2	—	—	—																																																										⁴R4										⁴R3											
North Carolina A&T	CAA	2	—	—	—																																																											⁴R4													⁴R4							
Quinnipiac	Metro	2	—	—	—																																																											⁴R4														⁴R3						
Lehigh	Patriot	2	—	—	—																																																												⁴R4									⁴R4										
Wofford	Southern	2	—	—	—																																																													⁴R4																³R3		
Belmont	Missouri Valley	2	—	—	—																																																																	⁴R2	³R4													
South Dakota State	Summit	2	—	—	—																																																																			⁴R4												⁴R4
Radford	Big South	2	—	—	—																																																																					²R2		⁴R4								
Houston Christian	Southland	2	—	—	—																																																																					⁴R4									⁴R4	
Utah Valley	Big West	2	—	—	—																																																																						⁴R4								⁴R3	
USC Upstate	Big South	2	—	—	—																																																																														⁴R4	³R3
Ashland	D2	1	—	—	—								D3																																																																							
Seattle	West Coast	1	—	—	—								D4																																																																							
Willamette	defunct	1	—	—	—									D•																																																																						
Occidental	D3	1	—	—	—												D3																																																																			
American International	D2	1	—	—	—														D3																																																																	
Florida Southern	D2	1	—	—	—														D4																																																																	
Bridgeport	D3	1	—	—	—																D3																																																															
Puget Sound	D3	1	—	—	—																													R3																																																		
Catholic	D3	1	—	—	—																															R4																																																
Portland State	defunct	1	—	—	—																															R4																																																
Hardin–Simmons	D3	1	—	—	—																																				R•																																											
NYIT	D2	1	—	—	—																																					R4																																										
Akron	MAC	1	—	—	—																																																		⁶R•																													
Charleston Southern	Big South	1	—	—	—																																																		⁶R•																													
Northeastern Illinois	defunct	1	—	—	—																																																		⁶R•																													
Butler	Big East	1	—	—	—																																																						⁴R4																									
Wagner	NEC	1	—	—	—																																																						⁴R4																									
Birmingham–Southern	School closed	1	—	—	—																																																										³R3																					
St. Bonaventure	Atlantic 10	1	—	—	—																																																										⁴R4																					
UNC Asheville	Big South	1	—	—	—																																																												⁴R4																			
Brown	Ivy League	1	—	—	—																																																													⁴R4																		
Albany	America East	1	—	—	—																																																													⁴R4																		
UC Davis	Mountain West	1	—	—	—																																																														⁴R3																	
Mount St. Mary's	Metro	1	—	—	—																																																														⁴R4																	
Georgia State	Sun Belt	1	—	—	—																																																															⁴R4																
Alcorn State	SWAC	1	—	—	—																																																																	⁴R4														
Dayton	Atlantic 10	1	—	—	—																																																																		⁴R4													
Central Arkansas	UAC	1	—	—	—																																																																			⁴R2												
Savannah State	D2	1	—	—	—																																																																			⁴R4												
Cal State Bakersfield	Big West	1	—	—	—																																																																					⁴R3										
Florida Gulf Coast	ASUN	1	—	—	—																																																																							²R3								
Hartford	D3	1	—	—	—																																																																								⁴R4							
Omaha	Summit	1	—	—	—																																																																									⁴R4						
NJIT	America East	1	—	—	—																																																																										⁴R3					
Norfolk State	NEC	1	—	—	—																																																																										⁴R4					
Presbyterian	Big South	1	—	—	—																																																																										⁴R4					
Coppin State	NEC	1	—	—	—																																																																											⁴R4				
Hofstra	CAA	1	—	—	—																																																																											⁴R4				
High Point	Big South	1	—	—	—																																																																													⁴R3		
Niagara	Metro	1	—	—	—																																																																													⁴R4		
Northern Kentucky	Horizon	1	—	—	—																																																																													⁴R4		
Tarleton State	UAC	1	—	—	—																																																																															³R3

=== List of NCAA Division I teams with no appearances ===
List of schools
School	Conference
Abilene Christian	UAC
Alabama A&M	SWAC
Arkansas–Pine Bluff	SWAC
Bellarmine	Atlantic Sun
California Baptist	Big West
Delaware State	NEC
Fairleigh Dickinson	NEC
Gardner–Webb	Big South
Georgetown	Big East
Incarnate Word	Southland
Iona	Metro
Lindenwood	Ohio Valley
Longwood	Big South
Maryland Eastern Shore	NEC
Mercyhurst (Note: Will become eligible for the tournament in 2028 after completing transition period from Division II.)	NEC
Merrimack	Metro
Mississippi Valley State	SWAC
New Haven (Note: Will become eligible for the tournament in 2029 after completing transition period from Division II.)	NEC
North Alabama	UAC
North Florida	ASUN
Oakland	Horizon
Pacific	West Coast
Queens	ASUN
Saint Peter's (Note: The Peacocks had won the 1994 MAAC Tournament but at the time, the NCAA Tournament did not give all tournament winners an auto bid, so Saint Peter's had to play Atlantic 10 champion West Virginia in a best-of-three "NCAA Play-In Series". The Peacocks lost in two games, which meant the Mountaineers went to the NCAA tournament.)	Metro
St. Thomas	Summit
SIU Edwardsville	Ohio Valley
Southern Indiana	Ohio Valley
Stephen F. Austin	Southland
Stonehill	NEC
UT Martin	Ohio Valley
Texas A&M–Corpus Christi	Southland
Toledo	MAC
UC San Diego	Big West (Note: Joining the West Coast Conference in July 2027.)
UMass Lowell	America East
Utah Tech	Mountain West
VMI	Southern
West Georgia	UAC
West Florida (Note: Will become eligible for the tournament in 2030 after completing transition period from Division II.)	ASUN
Western Illinois	Ohio Valley

== Past formats ==
Overview of Tournament Formats
Year	Total Teams	Region			Super Regional	College World Series		
Year	Total Teams	No.	Teams	Format	Super Regional	Teams	Format	Championship
1947	8	2	4	Single-elimination		2	Best-of-three	
1948	8	2	4	Double-elimination		2	Best-of-three	
1949	8	4	2	Best-of-three		4	Double-elimination	
1950–1953	8	Each district determined its manner for selection, some held unofficial tournaments				8	Double-elimination	
1954	24	8	2 to 4	Varied		8	Double-elimination	
1955	25	8	2 to 4	Varied		8	Double-elimination	
1956	24	8	1 to 4	Varied		8	Double-elimination	
1957	23	8	2 to 4	Varied		8	Double-elimination	
1958	26	8	2 to 4	Varied		8	Double-elimination	
1959	22	8	1 to 4	Varied		8	Double-elimination	
1960	25	8	1 to 4	Varied		8	Double-elimination	
1961	25	8	2 to 4	Varied		8	Double-elimination	
1962	27	8	2 to 4	Varied		8	Double-elimination	
1963	23	8	2 to 4	Varied		8	Double-elimination	
1964	21	8	1 to 4	Varied		8	Double-elimination	
1965	23	8	2 to 4	Varied		8	Double-elimination	
1966	29	8	2 to 4	Varied		8	Double-elimination	
1967	25	8	2 to 4	Varied		8	Double-elimination	
1968	27	8	2 to 5	Varied		8	Double-elimination	
1969	23	8	2 to 4	Varied		8	Double-elimination	
1970	26	8	2 to 4	Varied		8	Double-elimination	
1971	23	8	2 to 4	Varied		8	Double-elimination	
1972	28	8	2 to 6	Varied		8	Double-elimination	
1973	32	8	3 to 6	Varied		8	Double-elimination	
1974	28	8	2 to 6	Varied		8	Double-elimination	
1975	32	8	4	Double-elimination		8	Double-elimination	
1976–1981	34	8	4 or 6	Double-elimination		8	Double-elimination	
1982–1987	36	8	4 or 6	Double-elimination		8	Double-elimination	
1988–1998	48	8	6	Double-elimination		8	Double-elimination	Single-elimination
1999–2003	64	16	4	Double-elimination	Best-of-three	8	Double-elimination	Single-elimination
2004–pres.	64	16	4	Double-elimination	Best-of-three	8	Double-elimination	Best-of-three

=== 1947 ===
The first tournament was an 8 team single elimination tournament. Four teams each were put into two playoff brackets, named the "Eastern playoff" and the "Western playoff." The winner of each bracket moved on to the College World Series, which was, at that time, a 2 team best-of-three-game series.

=== 1948 ===
The second year of the tournament maintained the "Eastern playoff" and "Western playoff" format, however, they were now double elimination. The winner of each bracket moved on to the College World Series to play a best-of-three-game series.

=== 1949 ===
The third year of the tournament consisted of four regions named Region A, Region B, Region C, and Region D. Each region consisted of two teams playing in a best-of-three-game series. The winner of each region moved on to the College World Series, which was now a four-team double-elimination tournament.

=== 1950–1953 ===
From 1950 through 1953, the preliminary rounds were not managed by the NCAA but rather by the district colleges, and thus these games are not recorded in the official history books of the NCAA. The winner of each district managed playoff (although some districts did not have playoffs and chose to select their teams by committee) were sent to the College World Series, which was an eight-team double-elimination tournament. The 1950 event was the first in Omaha, where it has remained.

=== 1954–1974 ===
From 1954 through 1974 the tournament consisted of eight districts, named by number. Each consisted of between two and five teams playing in differently formatted tournaments. Some years included automatic College World Series qualifiers, and that team played no district games; for an example see 1959. The winner of each district moved on to the College World series, which was double-elimination.

=== 1975 ===
The first year of the regional format was 1975. Eight regionals consisted of four teams in a double-elimination tournament. The winner of each regional moved on to the College World Series, also double-elimination.

=== 1976–1981 ===
The tournament essentially remained unchanged from the 1975 version, however, one regional consisted of six teams in a double-elimination tournament, with four teams in each of the other seven regionals. The winner of each regional moved on to the College World Series, also double-elimination.

=== 1982–1987 ===
The tournament expanded again in 1982—to 36 teams—to include two regionals with six teams while the other six regionals only had four teams. The Regionals remained double-elimination with the winners moving onto the College World Series, also double-elimination.

Subsequently, the tournament field expanded to 38 teams in 1985, 40 teams in 1986, and 48 teams in 1987.

=== 1988–1998 ===
From 1988 through 1998, the NCAA tournament featured 48 teams, which contested in eight regionals of six teams each for the right to go to the College World Series.

=== 1999–2017 ===
The four-team regional format and the best-of-three super regional format debuted in 1999, with the expansion of the tournament to 64 teams.

The best-of-three championship series at the College World Series debuted in 2003 after CBS ceased coverage of the "one-off" College World Series championship game. This allowed the NCAA to institute the best-of-three series for the finals, which better mimics the traditional three-game series played during the regular season and makes a pitching staff's depth a key factor. ESPN and ESPN2 now cover the entire CWS. After 61 years at Johnny Rosenblatt Stadium, the College World Series moved to the new TD Ameritrade Park in 2011.

=== 2018–present ===
For the first time, the 2018 NCAA Division I baseball tournament seeded the top 16 teams, rather than only the top 8 teams as had been the practice since 1999. This ensures that the regional featuring top ranked team will be paired with the regional hosted by the sixteenth seeded team, where the previous Super Regionals qualifiers were paired generally along geographical lines. ESPN, ESPN2, ESPNU, SEC Network, & ESPN3 covered every regional. Prior to 2025, the Longhorn Network also covered games that Texas hosts for people in Texas for regionals but featured on ESPN3 since Longhorn Network was an ESPN sports network only in Texas. The Longhorn Network shut down on July 1, 2024 when Texas joined the Southeastern Conference.

All Super Regionals are on ESPN, ESPN2 & ESPNU. However they are mainly on ESPN2 & ESPNU. The CWS is on ESPN & ESPN2.

== National seeds ==
In 1999, the NCAA began awarding eight teams with a national seed. These teams automatically host a super regional if they advance past the regional round, unless their facilities are considered inadequate by the NCAA and thus do not bid to host, or their home stadium is unavailable because of scheduling conflicts; in some cases, a team may share a stadium with a minor league professional baseball team, or if their stadium does not meet NCAA requirements, host the event at the professional team's stadium. The former was the case for Cal State Fullerton in 1999, as its ballpark lacked the required seating capacity and media facilities at the time, forcing the Titans to play their super regional at Ohio State. Also in 1999, Rice hosted a super regional at the Astrodome, which was in its final season as home of the Houston Astros. The Owls' rebuilt facility, Reckling Park, hosted its first regional in 2001 and first super regional in 2002. In 2015, Missouri State was unable to host because of scheduling conflicts with the minor-league team whose off-campus ballpark it used. In 2018, the NCAA expanded the national seeds to 16 teams, guaranteeing the lower seed the ability to host the super regional if the higher seed does not advance.

Gray Shade and Italics indicates team made the Men's College World Series. Bold Italics indicates team won the Men's College World Series.

Year	No. 1	No. 2	No. 3	No. 4	No. 5	No. 6	No. 7	No. 8	No. 9	No. 10	No. 11	No. 12	No. 13	No. 14	No. 15	No. 16
1999	Miami (FL)	Florida State	Cal State Fullerton	Baylor	Alabama	Stanford	Texas A&M	Rice	Not released							
2000	South Carolina	LSU	Georgia Tech	Clemson	Houston	Florida State	Arizona State	Stanford	Not released							
2001	Cal State Fullerton	Miami (FL)	Southern California	Stanford	Tulane	Georgia	East Carolina	Nebraska	Not released							
2002	Florida State	Clemson	Alabama	Rice	Texas	South Carolina	Wake Forest	Stanford	Not released							
2003	Florida State	LSU	Georgia Tech	Auburn	Rice	Stanford	Cal State Fullerton	Miami (FL)	Not released							
2004	Texas	South Carolina	Miami (FL)	Georgia Tech	Stanford	Rice	Arizona State	Arkansas	Not released							
2005	Tulane	Georgia Tech	Nebraska	Baylor	Ole Miss	Cal State Fullerton	Florida	Oregon State	Not released							
2006	Clemson	Rice	Texas	Alabama	Cal State Fullerton	Nebraska	Georgia	Georgia Tech	Not released							
2007	Vanderbilt	Rice	North Carolina	Texas	Arizona State	Florida State	Arkansas	San Diego	Not released							
2008	Miami (FL)	North Carolina	Arizona State	Florida State	Cal State Fullerton	Rice	LSU	Georgia	Not released							
2009	Texas	Cal State Fullerton	LSU	North Carolina	Arizona State	UC Irvine	Oklahoma	Florida	Not released							
2010	Arizona State	Texas	Florida	Coastal Carolina	Virginia	UCLA	Louisville	Georgia Tech	Not released							
2011	Virginia	Florida	North Carolina	South Carolina	Florida State	Vanderbilt	Texas	Rice	Not released							
2012	Florida	UCLA	Florida State	Baylor	Oregon	North Carolina	LSU	South Carolina	Not released							
2013	North Carolina	Vanderbilt	Oregon State	LSU	Cal State Fullerton	Virginia	Florida State	Oregon	Not released							
2014	Oregon State	Florida	Virginia	Indiana	Florida State	Louisiana–Lafayette	TCU	LSU	Not released							
2015	UCLA	LSU	Louisville	Florida	Miami (FL)	Illinois	TCU	Missouri State	Not released							
2016	Florida	Louisville	Miami (FL)	Texas A&M	Texas Tech	Mississippi State	Clemson	LSU	Not released							
2017	Oregon State	North Carolina	Florida	LSU	Texas Tech	TCU	Louisville	Stanford	Not released							
2018	Florida	Stanford	Oregon State	Ole Miss	Arkansas	North Carolina	Florida State	Georgia	Texas Tech	Clemson	Stetson	East Carolina	Texas	Minnesota	Coastal Carolina	NC State
2019	UCLA	Vanderbilt	Georgia Tech	Georgia	Arkansas	Mississippi State	Louisville	Texas Tech	Oklahoma State	East Carolina	Stanford	Ole Miss	LSU	North Carolina	West Virginia	Oregon State
2020	No tournament due to the COVID-19 pandemic															
2021	Arkansas	Texas	Tennessee	Vanderbilt	Arizona	TCU	Mississippi State	Texas Tech	Stanford	Notre Dame	Old Dominion	Ole Miss	East Carolina	Oregon	Florida	Louisiana Tech
2022	Tennessee	Stanford	Oregon State	Virginia Tech	Texas A&M	Miami (FL)	Oklahoma State	East Carolina	Texas	North Carolina	Southern Miss	Louisville	Florida	Auburn	Maryland	Georgia Southern
2023	Wake Forest	Florida	Arkansas	Clemson	LSU	Vanderbilt	Virginia	Stanford	Miami (FL)	Coastal Carolina	Oklahoma State	Kentucky	Auburn	Indiana State	South Carolina	Alabama
2024	Tennessee	Kentucky	Texas A&M	North Carolina	Arkansas	Clemson	Georgia	Florida State	Oklahoma	NC State	Oklahoma State	Virginia	Arizona	UC Santa Barbara	Oregon State	East Carolina
2025	Vanderbilt	Texas	Arkansas	Auburn	North Carolina	LSU	Georgia	Oregon State	Florida State	Ole Miss	Clemson	Oregon	Coastal Carolina	Tennessee	UCLA	Southern Miss
2026	UCLA	Georgia Tech	Georgia	Auburn	North Carolina	Texas	Alabama	Florida	Southern Miss	Florida State	Oregon	Texas A&M	Nebraska	Mississippi State	Kansas	West Virginia

== Regional and Super Regional Hosts (1999–present) ==
Starting in 1999, the NCAA expanded to a 64-team format with a regional and subsequent super regional round, with the winners of the super regionals advancing to the MCWS. The tournament begins with 16 double-elimination regional sites of four teams each; the NCAA seeds the teams 1–4 and announces the host school and venue, which is generally hosted by the highest seeded team in the region at their home stadium. The winners of each regional (16 teams) advance to the super regional round, divided into eight super regional locations, each with two teams facing off in a best-of-three series; once again, the NCAA announces the host site between rounds, and each super regional is generally hosted by the higher-seeded of the two teams.

Teams must submit a bid for hosting rights. At times, the host venue has been hosted at a venue of the highest seed's choosing that is not its home field, or hosted by a team that is not the highest team in the region, due to a number of factors including scheduling conflicts at the highest team's home venue, the host school's home venue being inadequate to host according to NCAA criteria, the host school not submitting a bid, and severe weather.

- Italicized venues indicates a host venue that is not the primary home stadium of the host team.
- **Bold** indicates the host team won the series.
- An asterisk (*) indicates that the host school was not the highest seeded team in that year's regional or super regional.

Host School	City	State	Venue	Reg. Hosted	Host Reg. Won	Win Pct.	Years Hosted	Super Reg. Hosted	Host Super Reg. Won	Win Pct.	Years Hosted
Florida State	Tallahassee	FL	Dick Howser Stadium	21	17	.810	**1999, 2000, 2001, 2002, 2003, 2004, 2005,** 2007, **2008, 2009, 2011, 2012, 2013,** 2014, **2015, 2016, 2017,** 2018, **2024, 2025**, 2026	12	7	.583	**1999, 2000,** 2002, 2003, **2008,** 2009, **2010,** 2011, **2012,** 2013, **2017, 2024**
LSU	Baton Rouge	LA	Alex Box Stadium: 1999–2008 Alex Box Stadium, Skip Bertman Field: 2009–present	18	16	.889	**1999*, 2000, 2001, 2002, 2003, 2004,** 2005, **2008, 2009, 2012, 2013,** 2014, **2015, 2016, 2017, 2019, 2023, 2025**	13	10	.769	**2000, 2003, 2004, 2008, 2009,** 2012, **2013, 2015,** 2016, **2017,** 2019, **2023**, **2025**
Florida	Gainesville	FL	McKethan Stadium: 2002–2018 Condron Ballpark: 2021–present	15	10	.667	2002, **2005, 2009, 2010, 2011, 2012,** 2014, **2015, 2016, 2017, 2018,** 2021, 2022, **2023**, 2026	10	9	.900	**2005,** 2009, **2010, 2011, 2012, 2015, 2016, 2017, 2018, 2023**
North Carolina	Chapel Hill	NC	Boshamer Stadium: 2006–2007, 2009–present USA Baseball National Training Complex (Cary, NC): 2008	14	12	.857	**2006, 2007, 2008, 2009, 2011,** 2012, **2013,** 2017, **2018, 2019, 2022, 2024, 2025, 2026**	11	8	.727	**2007, 2008, 2009, 2011, 2013, 2018,** 2019, 2022, **2024**, 2025, **2026**
Texas	Austin	TX	Disch-Falk Field: 2002–2006, 2009–present Dell Diamond (Round Rock, TX): 2007	14	11	.786	**2002, 2003, 2004, 2005,** 2006, 2007, **2009, 2010, 2011, 2018, 2021, 2022**, 2025, **2026**	10	9	.900	**2000, 2002, 2004, 2009,** 2010, **2011, 2014, 2018, 2021, 2026**
Miami (FL)	Coral Gables	FL	Mark Light Field	14	10	.714	**1999, 2000, 2001, 2003, 2004, 2005, 2008, 2010,** 2012, 2014, **2015, 2016,** 2022, 2023	7	7	1.000	**1999, 2001, 2003, 2004, 2008, 2015, 2016**
South Carolina	Columbia	SC	Sarge Frye Field: 2000–2007 Founders Park: 2010–present	13	11	.846	**2000, 2001*, 2002, 2004, 2007, 2010, 2011, 2012, 2013,** 2014, **2016,** 2021*, **2023**	8	5	.625	2000, **2002, 2003, 2004, 2011, 2012**, 2016, 2021 (Note: In 2021, due to COVID-19 safety measures, super regional sites were all hosted at sites that also hosted regionals. South Carolina's home stadium, Founders Park, which hosted a regional, remained as host for the Super Regional matchup between Virginia and Dallas Baptist, which had both advanced out of regionals they did not host.)
Stanford	Stanford	CA	Sunken Diamond	13	10	.769	**1999, 2000, 2001, 2002, 2003,** 2004, **2008, 2012,** 2017, 2018, **2019, 2021, 2022, 2023**	7	7	1.000	**1999, 2000, 2001, 2002, 2003,** **2022, 2023**
Clemson	Clemson	SC	Doug Kingsmore Stadium	13	7	.538	**2000, 2001*, 2002, 2005, 2006, 2009,** 2011, 2016, 2017, 2018, 2023, **2024**, 2025	5	4	.800	**2000, 2002, 2006, 2010**, 2024
Cal State Fullerton	Fullerton	CA	Goodwin Field	12	10	.833	2000*, **2001, 2003, 2004*, 2005, 2006, 2008, 2009, 2010,** 2011, **2013, 2015**	10	6	.600	**2001, 2003, 2004,** 2005, **2006, 2007,** 2008, **2009,** 2013, 2018
Arkansas	Fayetteville	AR	Baum-Walker Stadium	12	6	.500	1999, **2004,** 2006*, 2007, **2010,** 2017, **2018, 2019, 2021,** 2023, 2024, **2025**	6	5	.833	**2004,** **2015*, 2018, 2019,** 2021, **2025**
Oregon State	Corvallis	OR	Goss Stadium	11	9	.818	**2005, 2006, 2011, 2013,** 2014, **2017, 2018,** 2019, **2022, 2024, 2025**	8	7	.875	**2005, 2006, 2007*, 2013, 2017, 2018,** 2022, **2025**
Texas A&M	College Station	TX	Olsen Field at Blue Bell Park	11	8	.727	**1999,** 2003, **2007, 2008, 2011,** 2012, **2015, 2016, 2022, 2024**, 2026	5	4	.800	**1999,** 2016, **2017,** **2022, 2024**
Virginia	Charlottesville (Note: The entire Virginia campus has a Charlottesville mailing address, but its ballpark is in unincorporated Albemarle County, which encloses but does not include the city of Charlottesville.)	VA	Davenport Field	11	6	.545	2004, 2006, 2007, **2010, 2011**, 2012, **2013, 2014**, 2016, **2023, 2024**	7	5	.714	2010, **2011,** 2013, **2014, 2015, 2023, 2024**
Rice	Houston	TX	The Astrodome (Houston, TX): 1999 Reckling Park: 2001–present	11	6	.545	**2001, 2002, 2003,** 2004, **2006, 2007, 2008,** 2009, 2011, 2012, 2014	6	6	1.000	**1999, 2002, 2003, 2006, 2007, 2008**
Ole Miss	Oxford	MS	Swayze Field	11	6	.545	2004, **2005, 2006, 2007, 2009,** 2014, 2016, 2018, **2019, 2021**, 2025	3	0	.000	2005, 2006, 2009
Georgia Tech	Atlanta	GA	Russ Chandler Stadium	11	5	.455	**2000, 2002,** 2003, **2004, 2005, 2006,** 2009, 2010, 2011, 2019, 2026	5	2	.400	2000, **2002,** 2004, 2005, **2006**
Vanderbilt	Nashville	TN	Hawkins Field	10	6	.600	2007, **2011, 2013, 2014, 2015,** 2016, **2019, 2021**, 2023, 2025	6	3	.500	**2011,** 2013, **2014,** 2018, 2019, **2021**
Louisville	Louisville	KY	Jim Patterson Stadium	9	8	.889	**2009,** 2010, **2013, 2014, 2015, 2016, 2017, 2019, 2022**	7	4	.571	**2007, 2014,** 2015, 2016, **2017,** 2019, **2025**
Arizona State	Tempe	AZ	Packard Stadium: 2000–2011 HoHoKam Stadium (Mesa, AZ): 2002	9	7	.778	2000, 2002*, **2003, 2005*, 2007, 2008, 2009, 2010, 2011**	4	3	.750	**2007,** 2008, **2009, 2010**
Georgia	Athens	GA	Foley Field	9	6	.667	**2001, 2004, 2006, 2008,** 2018, 2019, **2024**, 2025, **2026**	5	4	.800	**2001, 2006, 2008**, 2024, **2026**
TCU	Fort Worth	TX	Lupton Stadium	8	6	.750	**2009, 2010,** 2011, **2014, 2015, 2016, 2017,** 2021	4	4	1.000	**2014, 2015, 2017, 2023***
East Carolina	Greenville	NC	Fleming Stadium (Wilson, NC): 2001 Reg. Grainger Stadium (Kinston, NC): 2001 Super Reg., 2004 Clark–LeClair Stadium: 2009–present	8	6	.750	**2001, 2004, 2009,** 2018, **2019, 2021, 2022**, 2024	2	0	.000	2001, 2022
UCLA	Los Angeles	CA	Jackie Robinson Stadium	8	5	.625	**2010,** 2011, **2012, 2013,** 2015, **2019, 2025**, 2026	4	3	.750	**2010, 2012,** 2019, **2025**
Mississippi State	Mississippi State	MS	Dudy Noble Field	7	6	.875	**2000,** 2003, **2013, 2016, 2019, 2021, 2026**	4	3	.750	**2007,** 2016, **2019, 2021**
NC State	Raleigh	NC	Fleming Stadium (Wilson, NC): 2003 Doak Field: 2008–present	7	5	.714	**2003, 2008, 2012, 2013,** 2016, 2018, **2024**	1	1	1.000	**2013**
Auburn	Auburn	AL	Plainsman Park	7	4	.571	**1999*,** 2003, 2010, **2022**, 2023, **2025, 2026**	2	0	.000	2025, 2026
Nebraska	Lincoln	NE	Buck Beltzer Stadium: 2001 Haymarket Park: 2002–present	7	3	.429	**2001, 2002,** 2003, **2005,** 2006, 2008, 2026	3	3	1.000	**2001, 2002, 2005**
Oklahoma State	Stillwater	OK	Allie P. Reynolds Stadium: 2008–2015 Bricktown Ballpark (Oklahoma City, OK): 2019 O'Brate Stadium: 2022–present	7	2	.286	2008, **2014,** 2015, **2019,** 2022, 2023, 2024	1	0	.000	2014
Tennessee	Knoxville	TN	Lindsey Nelson Stadium	6	6	1.000	**2001*, 2005, 2021, 2022, 2024, 2025**	3	2	.667	**2021,** 2022, **2024**
Texas Tech	Lubbock	TX	Dan Law Field at Rip Griffin Park	6	4	.667	1999*, **2016,** 2017, **2018, 2019, 2021**	5	4	.800	**2014, 2016, 2018, 2019,** 2021
Coastal Carolina	Conway	SC	BB&T Coastal Field (Myrtle Beach, SC): 2007, 2010 Charles Watson Stadium: 2008; Springs Brooks Stadium: 2018–present	6	3	.500	2007, **2008, 2010,** 2018, 2023, **2025**	1	0	.000	2010
Oklahoma	Norman	OK	Bricktown Ballpark (Oklahoma City, OK): 2000–2004 L. Dale Mitchell Park: 2006–present	6	2	.333	2000*, 2004*, **2006,** 2009, **2010**, 2024				
Alabama	Tuscaloosa	AL	Sewell-Thomas Stadium	5	4	.800	**1999,** 2002, **2006, 2023, 2026**	3	2	.667	**1999,** 2006, **2026**
Long Beach State	Long Beach	CA	Blair Field	5	2	.400	**2003,** 2005, 2007, 2008, **2017**	2	0	.000	2004, 2017
Oregon	Eugene	OR	PK Park	5	2	.400	**2012,** 2013, 2021, 2025, **2026**	2	0	.000	2012, 2023
Notre Dame	Notre Dame	IN	Frank Eck Stadium	5	2	.400	1999*, 2001, **2002*,** 2004, **2021**				
Southern Miss	Hattiesburg	MS	Pete Taylor Park	5	1	.200	2003*, 2017, **2022**, 2025, 2026	2	0	.000	2022, 2023
Baylor	Waco	TX	Baylor Ballpark	4	3	.750	**1999,** 2000, **2005, 2012**	3	1	.333	1999, **2005,** 2012
Wake Forest	Winston-Salem	NC	David F. Couch Ballpark	4	3	.750	**1999,** 2002, **2017, 2023**	1	1	1.000	**2023**
Kentucky	Lexington	KY	Cliff Hagan Stadium: 2006–2017 Kentucky Proud Park: 2023–present	4	2	.500	2006, 2017, **2023, 2024**	1	1	1.000	**2024**
Houston	Houston	TX	Schroeder Park	4	1	.250	1999, **2000,** 2015, 2017	1	0	.000	2000
USC	Los Angeles	CA	Dedeaux Field	3	3	1.000	**1999*, 2001, 2002**	1	1	1.000	**2001**
Arizona	Tucson	AZ	Hi Corbett Field	3	2	.667	**2012, 2021**, 2024	2	2	1.000	**2012, 2021**
Louisiana	Lafayette	LA	M.L. Tigue Moore Field	3	2	.667	**2000*, 2014,** 2016	1	0	.000	2014
Wichita State	Wichita	KS	Eck Stadium	3	1	.333	1999, 2002, **2007**	1	0	.000	2007
Tulane	New Orleans	LA	Turchin Stadium: 2001 Regional, 2005–present Zephyr Field (Metairie, LA): 2001 Super Regional	2	2	1.000	**2001, 2005**	2	2	1.000	**2001, 2005**
Ohio State	Columbus	OH	Bill Davis Stadium	2	1	.500	**1999,** 2001*	2	0	.000	1999*, 2003
West Virginia	Morgantown (Note: West Virginia University is in Morgantown, but its ballpark is off-campus and outside the city limits in the town of Granville.)	WV	Kendrick Family Ballpark	2	1	.500	2019, **2026**	1	1	1.000	**2026**
Virginia Tech	Blacksburg	VA	English Field	2	1	.500	2013, **2022**	1	0	.000	2022
Minnesota	Minneapolis	MN	Siebert Field	2	1	.500	2000*, **2018**				
Indiana	Bloomington	IN	Bart Kaufman Field	2	1	.500	**2013,** 2014				
UC Santa Barbara	Santa Barbara (Note: The UCSB campus has a Santa Barbara mailing address, but is entirely in the unincorporated community of Isla Vista.)	CA	Lake Elsinore Diamond (Lake Elsinore, CA): 2015 Caesar Uyesaka Stadium: 2024	2	0	.000	2015, 2024				
Illinois	Champaign	IL	Illinois Field	1	1	1.000	**2015**	1	0	.000	2015
Kansas	Lawrence	KS	Hoglund Ballpark	1	1	1.000	**2026**	1	0	.000	2026
Kansas State	Manhattan	KS	Tointon Family Stadium	1	1	1.000	**2013**				
Missouri State	Springfield	MO	Route 66 Stadium	1	1	1.000	**2015**				
Stetson	DeLand	FL	Melching Field at Conrad Park	1	1	1.000	**2018**				
Indiana State	Terre Haute	IN	Bob Warn Field at Sycamore Stadium	1	1	1.000	**2023**				
Rutgers	Piscataway	NJ	Yogi Berra Stadium (Montclair, NJ): 2000	1	0	.000	2000				
Pepperdine	Malibu (Note: The Pepperdine campus has a Malibu mailing address, but is entirely outside the city limits in unincorporated Los Angeles County.)	CA	Eddy D. Field Stadium	1	0	.000	2006				
Missouri	Columbia	MO	Taylor Stadium	1	0	.000	2007				
San Diego	San Diego	CA	Tony Gwynn Stadium (San Diego, CA): 2007	1	0	.000	2007				
Michigan	Ann Arbor	MI	Ray Fisher Stadium	1	0	.000	2008*				
UC Irvine	Irvine	CA	Anteater Ballpark	1	0	.000	2009				
UConn	Storrs	CT	Dodd Memorial Stadium (Norwich, CT): 2010	1	0	.000	2010*				
Purdue	West Lafayette	IN	U.S. Steel Yard (Gary, IN): 2012	1	0	.000	2012				
Cal Poly	San Luis Obispo	CA	Robin Baggett Stadium	1	0	.000	2014				
Dallas Baptist	Dallas	TX	Horner Ballpark	1	0	.000	2015				
Louisiana Tech	Ruston	LA	J. C. Love Field at Pat Patterson Park	1	0	.000	2021				
Georgia Southern	Statesboro	GA	J. I. Clements Stadium	1	0	.000	2022				
Maryland	College Park	MD	Bob "Turtle" Smith Stadium	1	0	.000	2022				
California	Berkeley	CA	Stephen Schott Stadium (Santa Clara, CA): 2011					1	1	1.000	**2011**
Troy	Troy	AL	Riddle–Pace Field					1	1	1.000	**2026**
Duke	Durham	NC	Jack Coombs Field					1	0	.000	2025

== Attendance ==
The highest single-game attendance for an NCAA Super Regional was at Dudy Noble Field, Polk-Dement Stadium at Mississippi State University. On Saturday, June 12, 2021, 14,385 watched Mississippi State beat Notre Dame 9–8 in game 1 of a best of 3. The second highest was set the day after as 13,971 fans saw Notre Dame even the series with a 9–1 victory. For the decisive Monday game, 11,784 fans saw the Bulldogs defeat the Fighting Irish 11–7 to send Mississippi State on to the College World Series. This set the overall Super Regional at 40,140, breaking the former record of 35,730 set when Arkansas hosted Missouri State in a Super Regional in 2015. The highest for an off-campus facility was set at Zephyr Field, a minor-league park in New Orleans. In 2001, Tulane and LSU battled for 3 games in front of 34,341 fans.

The highest single-game attendance for an NCAA Regional game was also set at Mississippi State; 11,511 watched Mississippi State vs Central Michigan on June 1, 2019. For total attendance during a Regional series, LSU holds the top 2 spots at 67,938 in 1998 and 66,561 in 1997. Mississippi State holds the next three to round out the top 5--64,723 in 1997, 63,388 in 1989, and 62,191 in 1990. All of those Top 5 regional attendance records were set under the old six-team Regional format.

== Longest game in college baseball history ==
The longest college baseball game was a 2009 regional game between Boston College and host Texas on May 30 in Austin. Texas won 3–2 in 25 innings, which lasted over seven hours.

The second-longest game in tournament history occurred in a 2014 regional game between host TCU and Sam Houston State at Lupton Stadium in Fort Worth. TCU won 3–2 in 22 innings.

The third-longest game in tournament history occurred in a 2012 regional game between Kent State and Kentucky at U.S. Steel Yard in Gary, Indiana, where Kent State won 7–6 in 21 innings.

== See also ==
- College World Series
- List of NCAA Division I baseball programs
- NCAA Division I college baseball team statistics
- List of college baseball awards
- List of college baseball career home run leaders
- World University Baseball Championship
