= 2011 North Carolina Tar Heels baseball team =

American college baseball season

2011 North Carolina Tar Heels baseball

2011 College World Series, T-5th Place
- Conference: Atlantic Coast Conference
- Record: 51-16 (20–10 ACC)
- Head coach: Mike Fox (13th season)
- Assistant coaches: Scott Forbes; Scott Jackson
- Home stadium: Bryson Field at Boshamer Stadium

2011 Atlantic Coast Conference baseball standings
	Conf.				Overall
Team	W		L	PCT	W		L	PCT
Atlantic
No. 9 Florida State ^{x}‍‍‍^{y}	19	–	11	.633	46	–	19	.708
No. 21 Clemson ‍‍‍^{y}	17	–	13	.567	43	–	20	.683
NC State ‍‍‍^{y}	15	–	15	.500	35	–	27	.565
Wake Forest ‍‍‍	15	–	15	.500	25	–	31	.446
Boston College ‍‍‍	7	–	22	.241	17	–	33	.340
Maryland ‍‍‍	5	–	25	.167	31	–	25	.554
Coastal
No. 3 Virginia ^{x}‍‍‡‍^{y}	22	–	8	.733	56	–	12	.824
No. 19 Georgia Tech ^{x}‍‍‍^{y}	22	–	8	.733	42	–	21	.667
No. 5 North Carolina ‍‍‍^{y}	20	–	10	.667	51	–	16	.761
No. 22 Miami ‍‍‍^{y}	19	–	10	.655	38	–	23	.623
Virginia Tech ‍‍‍	11	–	19	.367	30	–	25	.545
Duke ‍‍‍	7	–	23	.233	26	–	30	.464
x – Division champion ‡ – Tournament champion y – Invited to the NCAA tournament As of June 24, 2011; Rankings from Collegiate Baseball

The 2011 North Carolina Tar Heels baseball team represented the University of North Carolina at Chapel Hill in the 2011 NCAA Division I baseball season. Head Coach Mike Fox was in his 13th year coaching the Tar Heels. They played their home games at Bryson Field at Boshamer Stadium and were members of the Atlantic Coast Conference's Coastal Division.

The Tar Heels reached the 2011 College World Series as the number 3 national seed, where they were eliminated by Vanderbilt.

== Personnel ==
=== Roster ===
2011 North Carolina Tar Heels roster
Pitchers: 4 - Bernard, Zach - Sophomore; 11 - Orlan, R. C. - Sophomore; 14 - Holt, Greg - Senior; 17 - Johnson, Patrick - Senior; 20 - Davis, Garrett - (redshirt) Junior; 25 - Cole, Jacob - Freshman; 26 - Taylor, Shane - Freshman; 27 - Parrish, Tate - Freshman; 28 - Morin, Michael - Sophomore; 29 - Johnson, Hobbs - Freshman; 31 - Messer, Jimmy - Junior; 32 - Gaines, Bryant - (redshirt) Senior; 33 - Stiles, Cody - Sophomore; 35 - Brechbuehler, Tim - (redshirt) Freshman; 36 - Smith, Andrew - Freshman; 37 - Munnelly, Chris - Sophomore; 38 - Penny, Cody - Sophomore; 39 - Tabakman, Jordan - Freshman; 41 - Emanuel, Kent - Freshman	Catchers: 5 - Stallings, Jacob - Junior; 7 - Roberts, Matt - Freshman; 10 - Holberton, Brian - Freshman; 34 - Wierzbicki, Jesse - Senior; Infielders: 1 - Coyle, Tommy - Sophomore; 6 - Michael, Levi - Junior; 8 - Jordan, Parks - Freshman; 18 - Moran, Colin - Freshman	Outfielders: 2 - Frank, Chaz - Sophomore; 3 - Bunting, Ben - Senior; 12 - Bouton, Jeff - Freshman; 16 - Balwin, Seth - Senior; 19 - Zengel, Tom - Freshman

== Schedule ==
2011 North Carolina Tar Heels baseball game log
Regular season
February

Date	Opponent	Rank	Site/stadium	Score	Win	Loss	Save	Attendance	Overall record	ACC record
Feb 18	vs. Cal Poly	#27	Dedeaux Field • Los Angeles, CA	W 2–1	Holt (1–0)	Anderson (0–1)	None		1–0	
Feb 19	at #12 Cal State Fullerton	#27	Goodwin Field • Fullerton, CA	W 4–3^{11}	Holt (2–0)	Floro (0–1)	Penny (1)	1,756	2–0	
Feb 20	vs. Missouri	#27	Dedeaux Field • Los Angeles, CA	W 11–3	Smith (1–0)	Hardoin (0–1)	None	858	3–0	
Feb 20	@ Southern California	#27	Dedeaux Field • Los Angeles, CA	W 11–7	Taylor (1–0)	Smith (0–1)	Penny (2)		4–0	
Feb 25	Seton Hall	#18	Boshamer Stadium • Chapel Hill, NC	W 10–5	Munnelly (1–0)	Prosinski (0–1)	None	1,278	5–0	
Feb 26	Seton Hall	#18	Boshamer Stadium • Chapel Hill, NC	W 7–1	Johnson (1–0)	Terhune (0–1)	None	1,692	6–0	
Feb 27	Seton Hall	#18	Boshamer Stadium • Chapel Hill, NC	L 1–3	Dirocco (2–0)	Morin (0–1)	Harvey (2)	1,663	6–1	

March

Date	Opponent	Rank	Site/stadium	Score	Win	Loss	Save	Attendance	Overall record	ACC record
Mar 1	Charlotte	17	Boshamer Stadium • Chapel Hill, NC	W 4–2	Emanuel (1–0)	Rothlin (1–1)	Penny (3)	372	7–1	
Mar 2	Davidson	17	Boshamer Stadium • Chapel Hill, NC	W 14–6	Stiles (1–0)	Mooney (1–2)	None	550	8–1	
Mar 4	Stony Brook	17	Boshamer Stadium • Chapel Hill, NC	W 5–1	Johnson (2–0)	Tropeano (1–1)	Holt (1)	706	9–1	
Mar 5	Stony Brook	17	Boshamer Stadium • Chapel Hill, NC	W 18–4	Munnelly (2–0)	Johnson (1–1)	None	1,200	10–1	
Mar 5	Stony Brook	17	Boshamer Stadium • Chapel Hill, NC	W 11–6	Holt (3–0)	McNitt (0–1)	None	1,642	11–1	
Mar 8	Elon	16	Boshamer Stadium • Chapel Hill, NC	W 16–0	Emanuel (2–0)	Clark (0–3)	None	477	12–1	
Mar 9	St. John's	16	Boshamer Stadium • Chapel Hill, NC	W 8–1	Stiles (2–0)	Kilpatrick (0–2)	None	199	13–1	
Mar 11	@ Wake Forest	16	Gene Hooks Field at Wake Forest Baseball Park • Winston-Salem, NC	W 7–1	Johnson (3–0)	Stadler (0–3)	None	791	14–1	1–0
Mar 12	@ Wake Forest	16	Gene Hooks Field at Wake Forest Baseball Park • Winston-Salem, NC	L 2–10	Cooney (2–1)	Munnelly (2–1)	None	1,058	14–2	1–1
Mar 13	@ Wake Forest	16	Gene Hooks Field at Wake Forest Baseball Park • Winston-Salem, NC	L 4–5	McLeod (1–0)	Emanuel (2–1)	None	924	14–3	1–2
Mar 15	Princeton	19	Boshamer Stadium • Chapel Hill, NC	W 11–2	Stiles (3–0)	Link (0–1)	None	397	15–3	
Mar 18	@ Virginia Tech	19	English Field • Blacksburg, VA	W 10–4	Johnson (4–0)	Mantiply (2–3)	None	1,724	16–3	2–2
Mar 19	@ Virginia Tech	19	English Field • Blacksburg, VA	W 5–4	Emanuel (3–1)	Zecchino (2–2)	Penny (4)	2,145	17–3	3–2
Mar 20	@ Virginia Tech	19	English Field • Blacksburg, VA	W 7–6	Smith (2–0)	Martier (1–1)	Munnelly (1)	643	18–3	4–2
Mar 22	UNC Wilmington	19	Boshamer Stadium • Chapel Hill, NC	W 14–2	Holt (4–0)	Leach (0–1)	None	1,002	19–3	
Mar 23	High Point	19	Boshamer Stadium • Chapel Hill, NC	W 4–0	Munnelly (3–1)	Swickle (1–2)	None	621	20–3	
Mar 25	Duke	19	Boshamer Stadium • Chapel Hill, NC	W 8–5	Johnson (5–0)	O'Grady (4–1)	Penny (5)	1,173	21–3	5–2
Mar 26	Duke	19	Boshamer Stadium • Chapel Hill, NC	W 11–2	Emanuel (4–1)	Bebout (2–1)	Holt (2)	1,507	22–3	6–2
Mar 27	Duke	19	Boshamer Stadium • Chapel Hill, NC	W 7–6^{11}	Morin (1–1)	Grisz (1–1)	None	486	23–3	7–2
Mar 29	@ Charlotte	11	Robert and Mariam Hayes Stadium • Charlotte, NC	L 3–4	Rothlin (2–2)	Taylor (1–1)	Pilkington (1)	1,667	23–4	

April

Date	Opponent	Rank	Site/stadium	Score	Win	Loss	Save	Attendance	Overall record	ACC record
Apr 1	#16 Clemson	11	Boshamer Stadium • Chapel Hill, NC	W 13–3	Johnson (6–0)	Weismann (2–4)	None	1,386	24–4	8–2
Apr 2	#16 Clemson	11	Boshamer Stadium • Chapel Hill, NC	W 9–5	Morin (2–1)	Moorefield (1–1)	None	3,014	25–4	9–2
Apr 3	#16 Clemson	11	Boshamer Stadium • Chapel Hill, NC	W 5–4	Penny (1–0)	Lamb (1–1)	None	2,912	26–4	10–2
Apr 5	Winthrop	9	Boshamer Stadium • Chapel Hill, NC	W 12–6	Holt (5–0)	Monteith (0–1)	None	445	27–4	
Apr 8	@ #12 Florida State	9	Mike Martin Field at Dick Howser Stadium • Tallahassee, FL	L 3–5	Bennett (2–1)	Morin (2–2)	McGee (5)	4,828	27–5	10–3
Apr 9	@ #12 Florida State	9	Mike Martin Field at Dick Howser Stadium • Tallahassee, FL	W 8–5	Taylor (2–1)	Busch (1–1)	Morin (1)	6,343	28–5	11–3
Apr 10	@ #12 Florida State	9	Mike Martin Field at Dick Howser Stadium • Tallahassee, FL	W 7–6	Holt (6–0)	Merians (5–2)	Morin (2)	4,534	29–5	12–3
Apr 12	East Carolina	6	Boshamer Stadium • Chapel Hill, NC	W 5–3	Morin (3–2)	Mincey (4–2)	None	1,612	30–5	
Apr 15	@ NC State	6	Doak Field • Raleigh, NC	L 4–5	Mazzoni (3–4)	Johnson (6–1)	Overman (3)	2,775	30–6	12–4
Apr 16	@ NC State	6	Doak Field • Raleigh, NC	L 7–8	Ogburn (4–2)	Taylor (2–2)	Overman (4)	1,727	30–7	12–5
Apr 17	@ NC State	6	Doak Field • Raleigh, NC	L 2–10	Chamra (5–0)	Munnelly (3–2)	None	2,828	30–8	12–6
Apr 19	Coastal Carolina	14	Boshamer Stadium • Chapel Hill, NC	W 8–3	Emanuel (5–1)	Hessler (1–1)	None	1,897	24–13	
Apr 23	#20 Miami (FL)	14	Boshamer Stadium • Chapel Hill, NC	L 6–13^{10}	Miranda (3–1)	Munnelly (3–3)	None	2,960	31–9	12–7
Apr 23	#20 Miami (FL)	14	Boshamer Stadium • Chapel Hill, NC	L 3–5	Whaley (6–2)	Taylor (2–3)	Robinson (4)	1,011	31–10	12–8
Apr 24	#20 Miami (FL)	14	Boshamer Stadium • Chapel Hill, NC	W 8–1	Emanuel (6–1)	Encinosa (3–3)	None	1,418	32–10	13–8
Apr 27	@ East Carolina	17	Clark–LeClair Stadium • Greenville, NC	W 5–4	Johnson (7–1)	Simmons (5–2)	Morin (3)	4,470	27–14	

May

Date	Opponent	Rank	Site/stadium	Score	Win	Loss	Save	Attendance	Overall record	ACC record
May 3	Gardner–Webb	17	Boshamer Stadium • Chapel Hill, NC	W 8–1	Munnelly (4–3)	Wilson (4–1)	None	572	34–10	
May 6	Maryland	17	Boshamer Stadium • Chapel Hill, NC	W 5–0	Johnson (8–1)	Beck (2–5)	None	1,422	35–10	14–8
May 7	Maryland	17	Boshamer Stadium • Chapel Hill, NC	W 5–4^{10}	Morin (4–2)	Wacker (2–4)	None	2,226	36–10	15–8
May 8	Maryland	17	Boshamer Stadium • Chapel Hill, NC	W 8–4	Munnelly (5–3)	Kirkpatrick (2–4)	Morin (4)	1,047	37–10	16–8
May 10	@ UNC Wilmington	17	Brooks Field • Wilmington, NC	W 11–5	Stiles (4–0)	Bradley (3–4)	None	1,431	38–10	
May 11	UNC Asheville	17	Boshamer Stadium • Chapel Hill, NC	W 4–2	Smith (3–0)	Roland (1–1)	Morin (5)	904	39–10	
May 13	@ #9 Georgia Tech	17	Russ Chandler Stadium • Atlanta, GA	W 3–2	Johnson (9–1)	Pope (10–3)	Morin (6)	1,280	40–10	17–8
May 14	@ #9 Georgia Tech	17	Russ Chandler Stadium • Atlanta, GA	L 8–9	Smelter (2–0)	Holt (6–1)	None	1,808	40–11	17–9
May 15	@ #9 Georgia Tech	17	Russ Chandler Stadium • Atlanta, GA	L 0–3	Farmer (9–2)	Munnelly (5–4)	Bard (7)	4,225	40–12	17–10
May 17	Appalachian State	16	Boshamer Stadium • Chapel Hill, NC	W 7–2	Holt (7–1)	Frankoff (1–1)	None	365	41–12	
May 19	#1 Virginia	16	Boshamer Stadium • Chapel Hill, NC	W 6–0	Johnson (10–1)	Winiarski (6–3)	None	2,017	42–12	18–10
May 20	#1 Virginia	16	Boshamer Stadium • Chapel Hill, NC	W 2–1	Orlan (1–0)	Hultzen (9–3)	Morin (7)	2,941	43–12	19–10
May 21	#1 Virginia	16	Boshamer Stadium • Chapel Hill, NC	W 3–2	Munnelly (6–4)	Roberts (10–1)	Morin (8)	3,537	44–12	20–10

Postseason
ACC Tournament

Date	Opponent	Rank	Site/stadium	Score	Win	Loss	Save	Attendance	Overall record	ACCT record
May 26	#16 (5) Miami (FL)	9	Durham Bulls Athletic Park • Durham, NC	L 5–7	Salcines (1–0)	Orlan (1–1)	Miranda (13)	3,259	44–13	0–1
May 27	(8) Wake Forest	9	Durham Bulls Athletic Park • Durham, NC	W 9–0	Johnson (11–1)	Cooney (7–3)	None	2,473	45–13	1–1
May 28	#5 (1) Virginia	9	Durham Bulls Athletic Park • Durham, NC	L 2–3	Mayberry (5–0)	Munnelly (6–5)'	Kline (17	5,258	45–14	1–2

NCAA Chapel Hill Regional

Date	Opponent	Rank	Site/stadium	Score	Win	Loss	Save	Attendance	Overall record	NCAAT record
June 3	(4) Maine	10	Boshamer Stadium • Chapel Hill, NC	W 4–0	Emanuel (7–1)	Bilodeau (10–3)	None	2,269	46–14	1–0
June 4	(3) James Madison	10	Boshamer Stadium • Chapel Hill, NC	W 14–0	Johnson (12–1)	Valadja (7–4)	None	3,023	47–14	2–0
June 5	(3) James Madison	10	Boshamer Stadium • Chapel Hill, NC	W 9–3	Orlan (2–0)	Valadja (7–5)	None	2,333	48–14	3–0

NCAA Chapel Hill Super Regional

Date	Opponent	Rank	Site/stadium	Score	Win	Loss	Save	Attendance	Overall record	Tournament record
June 10	#13 Stanford	7	Boshamer Stadium • Chapel Hill, NC	W 5–2	Johnson (13–1)	Appel (6–7)	Morin (9)	3,489	49–14	4–0
June 11	#13 Stanford	7	Boshamer Stadium • Chapel Hill, NC	W 7–5	Emanuel (8–1)	Pries (6–6)	Morin (10)	3,749	50–14	5–0

College World Series

Date	Opponent	Rank	Site/stadium	Score	Win	Loss	Save	Attendance	Overall record	CWS record
June 18	#3 (6) Vanderbilt	7	TD Ameritrade Park Omaha • Omaha, NE	L 3–7	Williams (2–0)	Johnson (13–2)	None	22,745	50–15	0–1
June 20	#5 (7) Texas	7	TD Ameritrade Park Omaha • Omaha, NE	W 3–0	Emanuel (9–1)	Green (8–4)	None	19,630	51–15	1–1
June 22	#3 (6) Vanderbilt	7	TD Ameritrade Park Omaha • Omaha, NE	L 1–5	Hill (6–1)	Holt (7–2)	None	24,394	51–16	1–2

== Ranking movements ==
Ranking movements Legend: ██ Increase in ranking ██ Decrease in ranking — = Not ranked
	Week																		
Poll	Pre	1	2	3	4	5	6	7	8	9	10	11	12	13	14	15	16	17	Final
Coaches'	—	—*	18	16	15	12	6	7	5	10	14	12	9	13	6	7			5
Baseball America	—	24	23	15	18	18	16	16	7	14	18	18	17	17	12	13			5
Collegiate Baseball^	27	18	17	16	19	19	11	9	6	14	17	17	17	16	9	10	7	7	5
NCBWA†	19	21	18	14	17	13	10	10	6	13	15	13	11	14	8	10		6	5

^ Collegiate Baseball ranked 40 teams in their preseason poll, but only ranked 30 teams weekly during the season.
† NCBWA ranks 30 teams in their preseason poll, but only ranks 25 teams weekly during the season.
* A new poll was not released for this week, so for comparison purposes, the previous week's ranking is inserted in this week's slot.
