= 2011 Virginia Cavaliers baseball team =

American college baseball season

2011 Virginia Cavaliers baseball

ACC Tournament champions Charlottesville Regional champions Charlottesville Super Regional champions College World Series Semifinal
- Conference: Atlantic Coast Conference
- Record: 56–12 (22–8 ACC)
- Head coach: Brian O'Connor (8th season)
- Assistant coaches: Kevin McMullan (8th season); Karl Kuhn (8th season)
- Home stadium: Davenport Field

2011 Atlantic Coast Conference baseball standings
	Conf.				Overall
Team	W		L	PCT	W		L	PCT
Atlantic
No. 9 Florida State ^{x}‍‍‍^{y}	19	–	11	.633	46	–	19	.708
No. 21 Clemson ‍‍‍^{y}	17	–	13	.567	43	–	20	.683
NC State ‍‍‍^{y}	15	–	15	.500	35	–	27	.565
Wake Forest ‍‍‍	15	–	15	.500	25	–	31	.446
Boston College ‍‍‍	7	–	22	.241	17	–	33	.340
Maryland ‍‍‍	5	–	25	.167	31	–	25	.554
Coastal
No. 3 Virginia ^{x}‍‍‡‍^{y}	22	–	8	.733	56	–	12	.824
No. 19 Georgia Tech ^{x}‍‍‍^{y}	22	–	8	.733	42	–	21	.667
No. 5 North Carolina ‍‍‍^{y}	20	–	10	.667	51	–	16	.761
No. 22 Miami ‍‍‍^{y}	19	–	10	.655	38	–	23	.623
Virginia Tech ‍‍‍	11	–	19	.367	30	–	25	.545
Duke ‍‍‍	7	–	23	.233	26	–	30	.464
x – Division champion ‡ – Tournament champion y – Invited to the NCAA tournament As of June 24, 2011; Rankings from Collegiate Baseball

2011 Virginia Cavaliers baseball team represented the University of Virginia in the 2011 NCAA Division I baseball season. The Cavaliers played their home games at Davenport Field. The team was coached by Brian O'Connor, leading his eighth season at Virginia.

The Cavaliers won the Atlantic Coast Conference Coastal Division and the 2011 Atlantic Coast Conference baseball tournament, then advanced to the 2011 College World Series as the top overall seed. They fell to eventual champion South Carolina in the semifinal.

== Personnel ==
=== Roster ===
2011 Virginia Cavaliers roster
Pitchers: 3 - Kyle Crockett; 12 - Corey Hunt; 16 - Branden Kline; 17 - Shane Halley; 18 - Tyler Wilson; 20 - Ryan Ashooh; 23 - Danny Hultzen; 25 - Will Roberts; 28 - Chad O'Connor; 29 - Scott Silverstein; 31 - Justin Thompson; 32 - Cody Winiarski; 34 - Artie Lewicki; 39 - Austin Young; 45 - Aaron Stull; 47 - Whit Mayberry	Infielders: 2 - Keith Werman; 4 - Reed Gragnani; 11 - Stephen Bruno; 13 - Jared King; 19 - Steven Proscia; 30 - Rob Amaro; Catchers: 8 - John Hicks; 35 - Kenny Swab	Outfielders: 5 - Mitchell Shifflet; 6 - Chris Taylor; 7 - John Barr; 9 - David Coleman; 14 - Colin Harrington; 22 - Mark Podlas; 27 - Tyler Biddix; 43 - Ryan Levine

=== Coaches ===
2011 Virginia Cavaliers baseball coaching staff
- Brian O'Connor – Head coach – 8th year
- Kevin McMullan - Associate head coach - 8th year
- Karl Kuhn - Assistant coach - 8th year
- Eddie Smith - Assistant coach - 5th year

== Schedule ==
2011 Virginia Cavaliers baseball game log
Regular season

February
Date	Opponent	Site/stadium	Score	Win	Loss	Save	Attendance	Overall record	ACC record
February 18	vs. UAB	Plainsman Park • Auburn, AL	6–4	Hultzen (1–0)	Woolley (0–1)	Kline (1)	4,096	1–0	
February 19	@ #25 Auburn	Plainsman Park • Auburn, AL	13–2	Wilson (1–0)	Luckie (0–1)	None	4,096	2–0	
February 20	vs. Arkansas State	Plainsman Park • Auburn, AL	8–2	Winiarski (1–0)	Wright (0–1)	None	3,322	3–0	
February 23	VMI	Davenport Field • Charlottesville, VA	4–3	Mayberry (1–0)	Devine (0–1)	Kline (2)	2,175	4–0	
February 25	East Carolina	Davenport Field • Charlottesville, VA	10–1	Hultzen (2–0)	Maness (1–1)	None	2,455	5–0	
February 26	East Carolina	Davenport Field • Charlottesville, VA	4–3	Wilson (2–0)	Woods (0–1)	Kline (3)	3,207	6–0	
February 27	East Carolina	Davenport Field • Charlottesville, VA	3–4	Wright (2–0)	Winiarski (1–0)	Simmons (1)	2,914	6–1	

March
Date	Opponent	Site/stadium	Score	Win	Loss	Save	Attendance	Overall record	ACC record
Mar 1	William & Mary	Davenport Field • Charlottesville, VA	9–0	Crockett (1–0)	Wainman (0–2)	None	2,034	7–1	
Mar 2	Niagara	Davenport Field • Charlottesville, VA	7–0	Roberts (1–0)	Klock (0–3)	None	2,031	8–1	
Mar 4	Cornell	Davenport Field • Charlottesville, VA	12–1	Mayberry (2–0)	Wood (0–1)	None		9–1	
Mar 4	Rider	Davenport Field • Charlottesville, VA	12–0	Hultzen (3–0)	Eppley (1–1)	None	2,299	10–1	
Mar 5	Rider	Davenport Field • Charlottesville, VA	4–1	Wilson (3–0)	Calogero (0–1)	Kline (4)		11–1	
Mar 5	Cornell	Davenport Field • Charlottesville, VA	14–2	Winiarski (2–1)	Schmetlzer (0–1)	None	2,488	12–1	
Mar 8	Marshall	Davenport Field • Charlottesville, VA	1–0	Roberts (2–0)	Sikula (0–3)	Kline (5)	2,012	13–1	
Mar 11	@ #4 Clemson	Doug Kingsmore Stadium • Clemson, SC	5–0	Hultzen (4–0)	Weisman (2–2)	None	4,051	14–1	1–0
Mar 12	@ #4 Clemson	Doug Kingsmore Stadium • Clemson, SC	8–7	Mayberry (3–0)	Frederick (0–2)	Kline (6)	5,374	15–1	2–0
Mar 13	@ #4 Clemson	Doug Kingsmore Stadium • Clemson, SC	7–6	Hunt (1–0)	Haselden (1–1)	Kline (7)	4,009	16–1	3–0
Mar 16	James Madison	Davenport Field • Charlottesville, VA	7–3	Roberts (3–0)	McFarland (0–1)	Kline (8)	2,417	17–1	
Mar 18	#4 Florida State	Davenport Field • Charlottesville, VA	4–3	Thompson (1–0)	Bennett (1–1)	None	4,268	18–1	4–0
Mar 19	#4 Florida State	Davenport Field • Charlottesville, VA	5–4	Kline (1–0)	Everett (0–1)	None	3,884	19–1	5–0
Mar 20	#4 Florida State	Davenport Field • Charlottesville, VA	11–12 (10)	McGee (1–1)	Lewicki (0–1)	None	3,742	19–2	5–1
Mar 22	Towson	Davenport Field • Charlottesville, VA	6–0	Roberts (4–0)	Patton (1–2)	None	2,042	20–2	
Mar 23	Towson	Davenport Field • Charlottesville, VA	5–0	Mayberry (4–0)	Bugna (1–1)	None	1,967	21–2	
Mar 25	Maryland	Davenport Field • Charlottesville, VA	14–1	Hultzen (5–0)	Ghysels (1–2)	Halley (1)	2,659	22–2	6–1
Mar 26	Maryland	Davenport Field • Charlottesville, VA	4–2	Crockett (2–0)	Wacker (1–1)	Kline (9)	2,762	23–2	7–1
Mar 26	Maryland	Davenport Field • Charlottesville, VA	4–2	Winiarski (3–1)	Potter (2–3)	Kline (10)	2,614	24–2	8–1
Mar 29	George Washington	Davenport Field • Charlottesville, VA	2–0	Roberts (5–0) (Note: Will Roberts recorded a perfect game on March 29, 2011 against George Washington.)	Gately (2–3)	None	2,078	25–2	

April
Date	Opponent	Site/stadium	Score	Win	Loss	Save	Attendance	Overall record	ACC record
Apr 1	@ Virginia Tech	English Field • Blacksburg, VA	18–3	Hultzen (6–0)	Mantiply (2–5)	Mayberry (1)	781	26–2	9–1
Apr 2	@ Virginia Tech	English Field • Blacksburg, VA	9–3	Wilson (4–0)	Zecchino (2–4)	None	1,464	27–2	10–1
Apr 3	@ Virginia Tech	English Field • Blacksburg, VA	10–2	Winiarski (4–1)	Parsons (4–2)	None	2,456	28–2	11–1
Apr 5	Radford	Davenport Field • Charlottesville, VA	2–0	Roberts (6–0)	Wimmer (2–2)	Kline (11)	2,448	29–2	
Apr 8	@ Georgia Tech	Russ Chandler Stadium • Atlanta, GA	6–2	Hultzen (7–0)	Pope (7–1)	None	2,171	30–2	12–1
Apr 9	@ Georgia Tech	Russ Chandler Stadium • Atlanta, GA	12–9	Thompson (2–0)	Bradley (3–1)	None	3,025	31–2	13–1
Apr 10	@ Georgia Tech	Russ Chandler Stadium • Atlanta, GA	8–10	Farmer (6–1)	Winiarski (4–2)	Bard (4)	1,525	31–3	13–2
Apr 12	Georgetown	Davenport Field • Charlottesville, VA	4–0 (5)	Roberts (7–0)	Heine (0–1)	None	2,276	32–3	
Apr 13	Coastal Carolina	Davenport Field • Charlottesville, VA	8–7	Kline (2–0)	Conway (4–1)	None	2,739	33–3	
Apr 15	Duke	Davenport Field • Charlottesville, VA	10–0	Hultzen (8–0)	Haviland (2–3)	None	3,550	34–3	14–2
Apr 17	Duke	Davenport Field • Charlottesville, VA	3–2	Kline (3–0)	Stroman (1–2)	None	4,065	35–3	15–2
Apr 17	Duke	Davenport Field • Charlottesville, VA	18–4	Roberts (8–0)	Grisz (2–2)	None	3,432	36–3	16–2
Apr 19	@ Radford	Radford Baseball Stadium • Radford, VA	12–0	Winiarski (5–2)	McDaniel (1–3)	None	1,373	37–3	
Apr 20	Richmond	Davenport Field • Charlottesville, VA	12–1	Silverstein (1–0)	Barber (1–1)	None	3,128	38–3	
Apr 23	NC State	Davenport Field • Charlottesville, VA	2–6	Chamra (6–0)	Hultzen (8–1)	None	4,183	38–4	16–3
Apr 23	NC State	Davenport Field • Charlottesville, VA	3–1	Wilson (5–0)	Mazzoni (3–5)	Kline (12)	3,489	39–4	17–3
Apr 24	NC State	Davenport Field • Charlottesville, VA	7–6	Crockett (3–0)	Sasser (1–3)	Kline (13)	3,452	40–4	18–3
Apr 29	@ Boston College	Shea Field • Chestnut Hill, MA	17–0	Hultzen (9–1)	Lawrence (2–2)	None	1,287	41–4	19–3
Apr 30	@ Boston College	Shea Field • Chestnut Hill, MA	4–5	Prohovich (3–1)	Thompson (2–1)	None	1,132	41–5	19–4

May
Date	Opponent	Site/stadium	Score	Win	Loss	Save	Attendance	Overall record	ACC record
May 1	@ Boston College	Shea Field • Chestnut Hill, MA	4–0	Roberts (9–0)	Laufer (0–2)	None	1,090	42–5	20–4
May 3	@ VCU	The Diamond • Richmond, VA	14–3	Winiarski (6–2)	Graham (1–1)	None	5,421	43–5	
May 13	#16 Miami (FL)	Davenport Field • Charlottesville, VA	2–6	Radziewski (8–2)	Hultzen (9–2)	Robinson (6)	4,058	43–6	20–5
May 14	#16 Miami (FL)	Davenport Field • Charlottesville, VA	3–2	Wilson (6–0)	Whaley (7–4)	Kline (14)	3,968	44–6	21–5
May 15	#16 Miami (FL)	Davenport Field • Charlottesville, VA	5–4	Roberts (10–0)	Encinosa (4–5)	Kline (15)	4,700	45–6	22–5
May 19	@ #16 North Carolina	Boshamer Stadium • Chapel Hill, NC	0–6	Johnson (10–1)	Winiarski (6–3)	None	2,017	45–7	22–6
May 20	@ #16 North Carolina	Boshamer Stadium • Chapel Hill, NC	1–2	Orlan (1–0)	Hultzen (9–3)	Morin (7)	2,941	45–8	22–7
May 21	@ #16 North Carolina	Boshamer Stadium • Chapel Hill, NC	2–3	Munnelly (6–4)	Roberts (10–1)	Morin (8)	3,537	45–9	22–8

Postseason

ACC Tournament
Date	Opponent	Site/stadium	Score	Win	Loss	Save	Attendance	Overall record	ACCT Record
May 25	(8) Wake Forest	Durham Bulls Athletic Park • Durham, NC	13–1	Wilson (7–0)	Holmes (3–4)	None	1,472	46–9	1–0
May 27	(5) #16 Miami (FL)	Durham Bulls Athletic Park • Durham, NC	6–4	Thompson (3–1)	Miller (2–1)	Kline (16)	4,419	47–9	2–0
May 28	(4) #9 North Carolina	Durham Bulls Athletic Park • Durham, NC	3–2	Mayberry (5–0)	Munnelly (6–5)	Kline (17)	5,258	48–9	3–0
May 29	(2) #12 Florida State	Durham Bulls Athletic Park • Durham, NC	7–2	Hultzen (10–3)	Scantling (3–2)	None	5,834	49–9	4–0

Charlottesville Regional
Date	Opponent	Site/stadium	Score	Win	Loss	Save	Attendance	Overall record	NCAAT record
June 3	(4) Navy	Davenport Field • Charlottesville, VA	6–0	Roberts (11–1)	Nelson (6–6)	None	4,749	50–9	1–0
June 4	(3) St. John's	Davenport Field • Charlottesville, VA	10–2	Hultzen (11–3)	Hansen (8–7)	None	5,050	51–9	2–0
June 5	(2) East Carolina	Davenport Field • Charlottesville, VA	13–1	Wilson (8–0)	Woods (2–3)	None	5,050	52–9	3–0

Charlottesville Super Regional
Date	Opponent	Site/stadium	Score	Win	Loss	Save	Attendance	Overall record	NCAAT record
June 11	#12 UC Irvine	Davenport Field • Charlottesville, VA	6–0	Hultzen (12–3)	Summers (11–3)	Winiarski (1)	5,050	53–9	4–0
June 12	#12 UC Irvine	Davenport Field • Charlottesville, VA	4–6	Thurman (4–3)	Kline (3–1)	None	5,050	53–10	4–1
June 13	#12 UC Irvine	Davenport Field • Charlottesville, VA	3–2	Kline (4–1)	Summers (11–4)	None	5,050	54–10	5–1

College World Series
Date	Opponent	Site/stadium	Score	Win	Loss	Save	Attendance	Overall record	CWS record
June 19	vs. #8 California	Johnny Rosenblatt Stadium • Omaha, NE	4–1	Wilson (9–0)	Scott (1–2)	Kline (18)	21,275	55–10	1–0
June 21	vs. (4) #4 South Carolina	Johnny Rosenblatt Stadium • Omaha, NE	1–7	Taylor (7–1)	Roberts (11–2)	None	22,027	55–11	1–1
June 23	vs. #8 California	Johnny Rosenblatt Stadium • Omaha, NE	8–1	Wilson (10–0)	Anderson (4–4)	None	25,833	56–11	2–1
June 24	vs. (4) #4 South Carolina	Johnny Rosenblatt Stadium • Omaha, NE	2–3 (10)	Price (7–3)	Winiarski (6–4)	None	25,882	56–12	2–2

== Ranking movements ==
Ranking movements Legend: ██ Increase in ranking ██ Decrease in ranking
	Week																		
Poll	Pre	1	2	3	4	5	6	7	8	9	10	11	12	13	14	15	16	17	Final
Coaches'	14	14*	10	6	5	3	1	2	2	1	1	1	1	1	3	1			4
Baseball America	15	13	13	11	7	3	2	2	2	1	1	1	1	1	5	2			3
Collegiate Baseball^	17	14	15	10	6	3	1	1	1	1	1	2	1	1	5	2	2	2	3
NCBWA†	13	10	8	6	5	3	2	2	2	1	1	3	2	1	4	1		1	3

^ Collegiate Baseball ranked 40 teams in their preseason poll, but only ranked 30 teams weekly during the season.
† NCBWA ranks 30 teams in their preseason poll, but only ranks 25 teams weekly during the season.
* A new poll was not released for this week, so for comparison purposes, the previous week's ranking is inserted in this week's slot.
