= 2011 College Baseball All-America Team =

This is a list of college baseball players named first team All-Americans for the 2011 NCAA Division I baseball season. From 2011 to 2014, there were five generally recognized All-America selectors for baseball: the American Baseball Coaches Association, Baseball America, Collegiate Baseball Newspaper, the National Collegiate Baseball Writers Association, and Perfect Game. In order to be considered a "consensus" All-American, a player must have been selected by at least three of these.

== Key ==
A	American Baseball Coaches Association
B	Baseball America
C	Collegiate Baseball Newspaper
N	National Collegiate Baseball Writers Association
P	Perfect Game
	Member of the National College Baseball Hall of Fame
	Consensus All-American – selected by all five organizations
	Consensus All-American – selected by three or four organizations

== All-Americans ==
Position	Name	School	#	A	B	C	N	P	Other awards and honors
Starting pitcher	Matt Barnes	UConn	3	✓	—	✓	✓	—	
Starting pitcher	Trevor Bauer	UCLA	5	✓	✓	✓	✓	✓	Golden Spikes Award ABCA Player of the Year Baseball America Player of the Year Collegiate Baseball Player of the Year National Pitcher of the Year
Starting pitcher	Sean Gilmartin	Florida State	3	—	✓	✓	✓	—	
Starting pitcher	Greg Gonzalez	Fresno State	2	—	—	✓	✓	—	
Starting pitcher	Sonny Gray	Vanderbilt	2	✓	—	—	—	✓	
Starting pitcher	Taylor Jungmann	Texas	5	✓	✓	✓	✓	✓	Dick Howser Trophy
Starting pitcher	Michael Roth	South Carolina	2	—	✓	—	—	✓	
Starting pitcher	Ross Stripling	Texas A&M	1	✓	—	—	—	—	
Relief pitcher	James Allen	Kansas State	1	—	—	—	✓	—	
Relief pitcher	Branden Kline	Virginia	1	—	—	—	✓	—	
Relief pitcher	Corey Knebel	Texas	4	✓	—	✓	✓	✓	Stopper of the Year
Relief pitcher	Cody Martin	Gonzaga	1	—	✓	—	—	—	
Relief pitcher	Matt Price	South Carolina	1	—	—	—	—	✓	
Catcher / DH	Jake Lowery	James Madison	2	—	✓	✓	—	—	Johnny Bench Award
Catcher	Chris O'Brien	Wichita State	1	—	—	—	✓	—	
Catcher	Mike Zunino	Florida	3	✓	✓	—	—	✓	
First baseman	C. J. Cron	Utah	5	✓	✓	✓	✓	✓	
Second baseman	Ross Heffley	Western Carolina	2	—	—	✓	✓	—	
Second baseman	Kolten Wong	Hawaii	3	✓	✓	—	—	✓	
Shortstop	David Herbek	James Madison	1	—	—	—	✓	—	
Shortstop	Brad Miller	Clemson	3	✓	✓	✓	—	—	Brooks Wallace Award
Shortstop	Joe Panik	St. John's	1	—	—	—	—	✓	
Third baseman	Jason Esposito	Vanderbilt	1	✓	—	—	—	—	
Third baseman	Tyler Hannah	Troy	1	—	—	✓	—	—	
Third baseman	Matt Leeds	Charleston	1	—	—	—	✓	—	
Third baseman	Colin Moran	North Carolina	2	—	✓	—	—	✓	
Outfielder	Jason Krizan	Dallas Baptist	5	✓	✓	✓	✓	✓	
Outfielder	Mikie Mahtook	LSU	3	✓	✓	—	—	✓	
Outfielder	Victor Roache	Georgia Southern	4	✓	✓	✓	✓	—	
Outfielder	George Springer	UConn	4	✓	—	✓	✓	✓	
Designated hitter	William Carmona	Stony Brook	1	—	—	✓	—	—	
Designated hitter	Joey DiMichele	Arizona State	1	✓	—	—	—	—	
Designated hitter	Adam Walker	Jacksonville	1	—	—	—	—	✓	
Designated hitter	Brad Zebedis	Presbyterian	1	—	—	—	✓	—	
Utility player	Cody Fick	Evansville	1	✓	—	—	—	—	
Utility player / SP	Danny Hultzen	Virginia	5	✓	✓	✓	✓	✓	John Olerud Award
Utility player	Bo Reeder	East Tennessee State	1	—	—	✓	—	—	

== See also ==
- List of college baseball awards
