= 2011 Southeastern Conference baseball tournament =

Baseball tournament in Hoover, Alabama

- Teams: 8
- Format: Double Elimination with flipped bracket
- Finals site: Regions Park; Hoover, Alabama
- Champions: Florida Gators (6th title)
- Winning coach: Kevin O'Sullivan (1st title)
- MVP: Daniel Pigott (Florida)
- Attendance: 97,675

The 2011 Southeastern Conference baseball tournament was held at Regions Park in Hoover, Alabama, United States, from May 25 through 29, 2011.

== Regular season results ==
The top eight teams (based on conference results) from the conference earned invites to the tournament.

Eastern Division
Team	W	L	T	Pct	GB	Seed
South Carolina	22	8		.733	-	1
Florida	22	8		.733	-	3
Vanderbilt	22	8		.733	-	4
Georgia	16	14		.533	6	5
Kentucky	8	22		.267	14	-
Tennessee	7	23		.233	15	-

Western Division
Team	W	L	T	Pct	GB	Seed
Arkansas	15	15		.500	-	2
Mississippi State	14	16		.467	1	6
Alabama	14	16		.467	1	7
Auburn	14	16		.467	1	8
LSU	13	17		.433	2	-
Ole Miss	13	17		.433	2	-

- Eliminated from SEC Tournament Contention

== Format ==
The 2011 tournament featured a "flipped bracket". This means that after two days of play the undefeated team from each bracket moved into the other bracket. This reduced the number of rematches teams had to play in order to win the tournament. Additionally, the tournament utilized a "pitch clock," limiting the amount of time that pitchers had to throw the ball to 20 seconds. This rule was not in effect when runners were on base.

== Tournament ==
First round
7	Alabama	7
2	Arkansas	4
6	Mississippi State	5
3	Florida	7
2	Arkansas	7
6	Mississippi State	2
8	Auburn	3
1	South Carolina	7
5	Georgia	0^
4	Vanderbilt	10^
8	Auburn	2
5	Georgia	3

Second round
7	Alabama	0
3	Florida	6
7	Alabama	1
2	Arkansas	4
1	South Carolina	2
4	Vanderbilt	7
1	South Carolina	2
5	Georgia	4

Semifinals
4	Vanderbilt	3	-
2	Arkansas	2	-
3	Florida	3	3
5	Georgia	4	2

Final
4	Vanderbilt	0
3	Florida	5

- After two days of play, the undefeated team from each bracket moved to the other bracket.
- * Game went to extra innings
- ^ Game ended after 7 innings because of mercy rule

== All-Tournament team ==
Position	Player	School
1B	Aaron Westlake	Vanderbilt
2B	Riley Reynolds	Vanderbilt
3B	Jason Esposito	Vanderbilt
SS	Nolan Fontana	Florida
C	James McCann	Arkansas
OF	Kyle Robinson	Arkansas
OF	Daniel Pigott	Florida
DH	Conrad Gregor	Vanderbilt
P	Hudson Randall	Florida
P	Sonny Gray	Vanderbilt
P	Michael Roth	S. Carolina
P	Michael Palazzone	Georgia
MVP	Daniel Pigott	Florida

== See also ==
- College World Series
- NCAA Division I Baseball Championship
- Southeastern Conference baseball tournament
- 2011 Alabama Crimson Tide baseball team
- 2011 Florida Gators baseball team
- 2011 LSU Tigers baseball team
- 2011 South Carolina Gamecocks baseball team
