= 2011 Alabama Crimson Tide baseball team =

American college baseball season

2011 Alabama Crimson Tide baseball
- Conference: Southeastern Conference
- West
- Record: 35–28 (14–16 SEC)
- Head coach: Mitch Gaspard (2nd season)
- Hitting coach: Andy Phillips
- Pitching coach: Dax Norris
- Home stadium: Sewell-Thomas Stadium

2011 Southeastern Conference baseball standings
	Conf.				Overall
Team	W		L	PCT	W		L	PCT
Eastern
No. 1 South Carolina ^{x}‍†‍‍^{y}	22	–	8	.733	55	–	14	.797
No. 2 Florida ^{x}‍†‍‡‍^{y}	22	–	8	.733	53	–	19	.736
No. 4 Vanderbilt ^{x}‍†‍‍^{y}	22	–	8	.733	54	–	12	.818
Georgia ‍‍‍^{y}	16	–	14	.533	33	–	32	.508
Kentucky ‍‍‍	8	–	22	.267	25	–	30	.455
Tennessee ‍‍‍	7	–	23	.233	25	–	29	.463
Western
No. 24 Arkansas ^{x}‍‍‍^{y}	15	–	15	.500	40	–	22	.645
No. 17 Mississippi State ‍‍‍^{y}	14	–	16	.467	38	–	25	.603
Alabama ‍‍‍^{y}	14	–	16	.467	35	–	28	.556
Auburn ‍‍‍	14	–	16	.467	29	–	29	.500
LSU ‍‍‍	13	–	17	.433	36	–	20	.643
Ole Miss ‍‍‍	13	–	17	.433	30	–	25	.545
x – Division champion † – Conference champion ‡ – Tournament champion y – Invited to the NCAA tournament As of June 28, 2011; Rankings from Baseball America

The 2011 Alabama Crimson Tide baseball team represented the University of Alabama in the 2011 NCAA Division I baseball season. The Crimson Tide played their home games in Sewell-Thomas Stadium.

== Personnel ==
=== 2011 roster ===
2011 Alabama Crimson Tide roster
Pitchers: 7 Brett Whitaker - Senior; 11 Trey Pilkington - Sophomore; 14 Christian Talley - Freshman; 16 Cary Baxter - Freshman; 17 Jay Shaw - Freshman; 21 Adam Windsor - Sophomore; 22 Nathan Kennedy - Junior; 24 Case Nixon - Freshman; 26 Jonathan Smart - Senior; 27 Taylor Wolfe - Sophomore; 28 Nathan Killcrease - Senior; 29 Charley Sullivan - Sophomore; 32 Adam Morgan - Junior; 33 Jason Zylstra - Junior; 36 Troy Sutherland - Sophomore; 38 Judson Luther - Freshman; 44 Tucker Hawley - Sophomore; 89 Devin Windham - Freshman	Catchers: 6 Josh Rosecrans - Junior; 23 Ladson Montgomery - Freshman; 37 Charley Waldrep - Freshman; 41 Brock Bennett - Senior; Infielders: 5 Brett Booth - Sophomore; 9 Jared Reaves - Junior; 18 Austen Smith - Freshman; 35 Josh Sanders - Senior; 39 James Tullidge - Junior; 42 Allen Dye - (redshirt) Freshman	Outfielders: 1 Taylor Dugas - Junior; 2 Andrew Miller - Sophomore; 12 Brandt Hendricks - Sophomore; 13 David Kindred - Senior; 40 Jeremiah Tullidge - Freshman; 46 Hunter Gregory - Junior; Utility: 10 Jon Kelton - Junior; 20 Patrick McGavin - Freshman

2011 Alabama Crimson Tide Baseball Roster

=== Coaching staff ===
2011 Alabama Crimson Tide baseball coaching staff
- 8 Mitch Gaspard – Head Coach - 11 years at Alabama (2nd as Head Coach)
- 3 Andy Phillips – Assistant Coach, Hitting Coach - 1st year
- 4 Dax Norris – Assistant Coach, Pitching Coach, Recruiting Coordinator - 5 years
- 43 Bobby Barbier – Volunteer Coach - 2 years
- 19 Adam Pavkovich – Fifth-year student assistant coach
- 25 Adam Scott – Fifth-year student assistant coach
- 30 Drew French – Director of Operations - 4 years

== Schedule/Results ==
2011 Alabama Crimson Tide baseball game log
Regular season
February (4–3)

#	Date	Opponent	Site/stadium	Score	Win	Loss	Save	Attendance	Overall record	SEC record
1	February 18	Alcorn State	Sewell-Thomas Stadium	11–0	A. Morgan (1–0)	S. Easter (0–1)	None	4,505	1–0	–
2	February 19	Alcorn State	Sewell-Thomas Stadium	5–1	N. Kilcrease (1–0)	T. Williams (0–1)	B. Whitaker (1)	4,793	2–0	–
3	February 20	Alcorn State	Sewell-Thomas Stadium	8–1	T. Hawley (1–0)	M. Sanchez (0–1)	None	4,270	3–0	–
4	February 22	Alabama State	Sewell-Thomas Stadium	11–7	T. Wolfe (1–0)	D. Quinney (0–1)	None	3,888	4–0	–
5	February 25	SE Louisiana	Stanky Field	2–6	B. Efferson (2–0)	A. Morgan (1–1)	None	–	4–1	–
6	February 26	South Alabama	Stanky Field	9–10	W. Dees (3–0)	J. Zylstra (0–1)	None	–	4–2	–
7	February 27	UCF	Stanky Field	4–12	B. Lively (1–0)	T. Hawley (1–1)	None	–	4–3	–

March (15–5)

#	Date	Opponent	Site/stadium	Score	Win	Loss	Save	Attendance	Overall record	SEC record
8	March 2	Southern Miss	Sewell-Thomas Stadium	6–10	J. Rogers (1–0)	C. Sullivan (0–1)	C. Cargill (3)	3,795	4–4	–
9	March 4	Northwestern State	Sewell-Thomas Stadium	7–5	B. Whitaker (1–0)	L. Irvine (2–1)	N. Kennedy (1)	3,368	5–4	–
10	March 5	Northwestern State	Sewell-Thomas Stadium	4–2	N. Kilcrease (2–0)	C. Bear (2–1)	J. Smart (1)	3,204	6–4	–
11	March 6	Northwestern State	Sewell-Thomas Stadium	9–0	T. Hawley (2–1)	M. Lackie (0–1)	None	3,492	7–4	–
12	March 8	Troy	Sewell-Thomas Stadium	6–5^{11}	N. Kennedy (1–0)	T. Workman (2–1)	None	3,336	8–4	–
13	March 9†	Georgia	Coolray Field	3–6	E. Swegman (1–0)	T. Wolfe (1–1)	B. Dieterich (1)	2,200	8–5	–
14	March 11	Eastern Illinois	Sewell-Thomas Stadium	3–2	J. Shaw (1–0)	M. Miller (0–1)	None	3,423	9–5	–
15	March 12	Eastern Illinois	Sewell-Thomas Stadium	12–1	A. Morgan (2–1)	L. Bushur (0–2)	None	3,523	10–5	–
16	March 13	Eastern Illinois	Sewell-Thomas Stadium	5–0	T. Hawley (3–1)	C. Slazinik (0–3)	None	3,534	11–5	–
17	March 15†	Auburn	Riverwalk Stadium	1–2	B. Hendrix (1–0)	T. Wolfe (1–2)	Z. Blatt (1)	7,492	11–6	–
18	March 18	Ole Miss	Swayze Field	0–4	M. Crouse (5–0)	N. Kilcrease (2–1)	J. Morgan (5)	8,665	11–7	0–1
19	March 19	Ole Miss	Swayze Field	7–5	A. Morgan (3–1)	D. Goforth (0–3)	J. Smart (2)	9,405	12–7	1–1
20	March 20	Ole Miss	Swayze Field	6–4	T. Hawley (4–1)	A. Wright (2–2)	J. Smart (3)	8,544	13–7	2–1
21	March 22	UAB	Sewell-Thomas Stadium	6–3	C. Sullivan (1–1)	B. Huddleston (1–2)	J. Smart (4)	4,335	14–7	–
22	March 23	Jacksonville State	Sewell-Thomas Stadium	9–5	T. Pilkington (1–0)	T. Sparks (0–1)	B. Whitaker (2)	3,431	15–7	–
23	March 25	Kentucky	Sewell-Thomas Stadium	4–0	N. Kilcrease (3–1)	A. Meyer (3–3)	None	4,102	16–7	3–1
24	March 26	Kentucky	Sewell-Thomas Stadium	6–5	J. Smart (1–0)	T. Gott (1–2)	None	3,575	17–7	4–1
25	March 27	Kentucky	Sewell-Thomas Stadium	8–3	T. Hawley (5–1)	T. Rogers (2–2)	J. Smart (5)	3,526	18–7	5–1
26	March 29	UAB	Regions Park	1–5	M. McKinley (2–0)	T. Pilkington (1–1)	None	903	18–8	–
27	March 30	South Alabama	Sewell-Thomas Stadium	4–3	A. Windsor (1–0)	J. Miller (0–3)	None	2,962	19–8	–

April (9–10)

#	Date	Opponent	Site/stadium	Score	Win	Loss	Save	Attendance	Overall record	SEC record
28	April 1	Arkansas	Sewell-Thomas Stadium	5–3	N. Kilcrease (4–1)	C. Lynch (2–1)	J. Smart (6)	3,977	20–8	6–1
29	April 2	Arkansas	Sewell-Thomas Stadium	5–3	A. Morgan (4–1)	D. Baxendale (5–1)	J. Smart (7)	4,877	21–8	7–1
30	April 3	Arkansas	Sewell-Thomas Stadium	3–4	T. Daniel (1–0)	T. Hawley (5–2)	N. Sanburn (3)	4,051	21–9	7–2
31	April 5	Samford	Sewell-Thomas Stadium	2–4	C. Irby (3–1)	C. Nixon (0–1)	A. Jones (8)	3,780	21–10	–
32	April 8	#1 Vanderbilt	Hawkins Field	3–11	S. Gray (7–1)	N. Kilcrease (4–2)	None	3,118	21–11	7–3
33	April 9	#1 Vanderbilt	Hawkins Field	0–7	G. Garvin (6–1)	A. Morgan (4–2)	None	3,141	21–12	7–4
34	April 10	#1 Vanderbilt	Hawkins Field	6–11	C. Williams (1–0)	T. Pilkington (1–2)	None	3,357	21–13	7–5
35	April 12	MS Valley St	Sewell-Thomas Stadium	10–1	C. Sullivan (2–1)	M. Kaplan (0–1)	None	3,347	22–13	–
36	April 13	MS Valley St	Sewell-Thomas Stadium	10–0	A. Windsor (2–0)	S. Barnes (4–4)	None	3,261	23–13	–
37	April 14	Tennessee	Sewell-Thomas Stadium	8–2	N. Kilcrease (5–2)	R. Catapano (2–3)	None	4,012	24–13	8–5
38	April 16	Tennessee	Sewell-Thomas Stadium	1–2^{7}	S. Gruver (4–4)	A. Morgan (4–3)	None	–	24–14	8–6
39	April 16	Tennessee	Sewell-Thomas Stadium	0–1^{7}	N. Blount (1–0)	T. Pilkington (1–3)	N. Williams (2)	5,483	24–15	8–7
40	April 19	Samford	Joe Lee Griffin Stadium	7–5	J. Smart (2–0)	A. Jones (0–3)	None	1,847	25–15	–
41	April 22	#5 Florida	McKethan Stadium	0–7	H. Randall (7–1)	N. Kilcrease (5–3)	None	4,206	25–16	8–8
42	April 23	#5 Florida	McKethan Stadium	2–9	B. Johnson (6–1)	A. Morgan (4–4)	None	4,917	25–17	8–9
43	April 24	#5 Florida	McKethan Stadium	1–2	K. Whitson (5–0)	J. Smart (2–1)	N. Maronde (2)	2,759	25–18	8–10
44	April 26	Southern Miss	Pete Taylor Park	7–3	A. Windsor (3–0)	D. Day (1–1)	T. Wolfe (1)	4,374	26–18	–
45	April 30	Mississippi State	Dudy Noble Field	5–4^{10}	J. Smart (3–1)	C. Reed (0–1)	None	–	27–18	9–10
46	April 30	Mississippi State	Dudy Noble Field	5–4	T. Pilkington (2–3)	L. Pollorena (5–3)	J. Smart (8)	6,500	28–18	10–10

May (4–6)

#	Date	Opponent	Site/stadium	Score	Win	Loss	Save	Attendance	Overall record	SEC record
47	May 1	Mississippi State	Dudy Noble Field	5–8	E. Mitchell (4–1)	A. Windsor (3–1)	C. Reed (8)	5,877	28–19	10–11
48	May 6	LSU	Sewell-Thomas Stadium	6–10	K. McCune (6–3)	N. Kilcrease (5–4)	None	4,175	28–20	10–12
49	May 7	LSU	Sewell-Thomas Stadium	4–0	A. Morgan (5–4)	K. Gausman (3–6)	J. Smart (9)	4,185	29–20	11–12
50	May 8	LSU	Sewell-Thomas Stadium	9–0	J. Smart (4–1)	B. Alsup (6–5)	None	4,019	30–20	12–12
51	May 14	Auburn	Plainsman Park	5–7	D. Ortman (2–1)	A. Windsor (3–2)	None	3,316	30–21	12–13
52	May 14	Auburn	Plainsman Park	7–8	E. Wallen (5–5)	C. Sullivan (2–2)	D. Ortman (4)	3,316	30–22	12–14
53	May 15	Auburn	Plainsman Park	7–6	T. Hawley (6–2)	S. Smith (2–1)	None	3,422	31–22	13–14
54	May 19	South Carolina	Sewell-Thomas Stadium	2–1	N. Kilcrease (6–4)	M. Roth (10–3)	None	3,523	32–22	14–14
55	May 20	South Carolina	Sewell-Thomas Stadium	3–6	F. Koumas (6–0)	A. Morgan (5–5)	M. Price (14)	3,945	32–23	14–15
56	May 21	South Carolina	Sewell-Thomas Stadium	2–3	C. Holmes (6–2)	J. Smart (4–2)	M. Price (14)	3,764	32–24	14–16

Post-season
SEC Tournament

#	Date	Opponent	Site/stadium	Score	Win	Loss	Save	Attendance	Overall record	SECT record
57	May 25	#20 Arkansas	Regions Park	7–4	N. Kilcrease (7–4)	R. Fant (3–4)	J. Smart (10)	8,392	33–24	1–0
58	May 26	#3 Florida	Regions Park	0–6	H. Randall (9–3)	A. Morgan (5–6)	None	7,123	33–25	1–1
59	May 27	#20 Arkansas	Regions Park	1–4	R. Stanek (3–2)	J. Smart (4–3)	T. Daniel (3)	8,068	33–26	1–2

NCAA Tournament: Regional

#	Date	Opponent	Site/stadium	Score	Win	Loss	Save	Attendance	Overall record	NCAAT record
60	June 3	UCF	Dick Howser Stadium	5–3	N. Kilcrease (8–4)	B. Adkins (6–5)	J. Smart (11)	2,832	34–26	1–0
61	June 4	#6 Florida State	Dick Howser Stadium	5–9	S. Gilmartin (12–1)	A. Morgan (5–7)	None	4,008	34–27	1–1
60	June 3	UCF	Dick Howser Stadium	12–5	J. Smart (5–3)	N. Cicio (4–3)	None	2,631	35–27	2–1
61	June 4	#6 Florida State	Dick Howser Stadium	1–11	M. McGee (4–3)	A. Windsor (3–3)	None	3,521	35–28	2–2

† Indicates the game does not count toward the 2011 Southeastern Conference standings.
*Rankings are based on the team's current ranking in the Baseball America poll the week Alabama faced each opponent.

== Rankings ==
Ranking movements Legend: ██ Increase in ranking ██ Decrease in ranking — = Not ranked
	Week																	
Poll	Pre	1	2	3	4	5	6	7	8	9	10	11	12	13	14	15	16	Final
Coaches'	—	—*	—	—	—	—	25	24	—	—	—	—	—	—	—	—	—	—
Baseball America	—	—	—	—	—	—	25	21	24	—	—	—	—	—	—	—	—	—
Collegiate Baseball^	—	—	—	—	—	—	21	19	—	—	—	—	—	—	—	—	—	—
NCBWA†	28	29	—	—	—	—	24	24	—	—	—	—	—	—	—	—	—	—

^ Collegiate Baseball ranked 40 teams in their preseason poll, but only ranked 30 teams weekly during the season.
† NCBWA ranks 30 teams in their preseason poll, but only ranks 25 teams weekly during the season.
* A new poll was not released for this week, so for comparison purposes, the previous week's ranking is inserted in this week's slot.

== Awards and honors ==
- Taylor Dugas

2011 NCBWA Preseason All-American, Third Team

- Josh Rosecrans

SEC Player of the Week, March 28, 2011

- Nathan Kilcrease

SEC Pitcher of the Week, May 23, 2011

== See also ==
- Alabama Crimson Tide baseball
- 2011 NCAA Division I baseball season
- 2011 Alabama Crimson Tide softball season

== Alabama Crimson Tide in the 2011 MLB draft ==
The following members of the Alabama Crimson Tide baseball program were drafted in the 2011 MLB draft.

Player	Position	Round	Overall	MLB team
Adam Morgan	LHP	3rd	120th	Philadelphia Phillies
Taylor Dugas	OF	8th	249th	Chicago Cubs
Nathan Kilcrease	RHP	30th	916th	Oakland Athletics
Brock Bennett	C	33rd	1017th	San Francisco Giants
