= 2011 Florida Gators baseball team =

American college baseball season

2011 Florida Gators baseball

SEC regular season co-champions SEC tournament champions Gainesville Regional champions Gainesville Super Regional champions

College World Series, runners-up 0–2 in CWS Finals
- Conference: Southeastern Conference

Ranking
- Coaches: No. 2
- CB: No. 2
- Record: 53–19 (22–8 SEC)
- Head coach: Kevin O'Sullivan (4th year)
- Assistant coach: Craig Bell (4th year); Brad Weitzel (4th year)
- Home stadium: Alfred A. McKethan Stadium

2011 Southeastern Conference baseball standings
	Conf.				Overall
Team	W		L	PCT	W		L	PCT
Eastern
No. 1 South Carolina ^{x}‍†‍‍^{y}	22	–	8	.733	55	–	14	.797
No. 2 Florida ^{x}‍†‍‡‍^{y}	22	–	8	.733	53	–	19	.736
No. 4 Vanderbilt ^{x}‍†‍‍^{y}	22	–	8	.733	54	–	12	.818
Georgia ‍‍‍^{y}	16	–	14	.533	33	–	32	.508
Kentucky ‍‍‍	8	–	22	.267	25	–	30	.455
Tennessee ‍‍‍	7	–	23	.233	25	–	29	.463
Western
No. 24 Arkansas ^{x}‍‍‍^{y}	15	–	15	.500	40	–	22	.645
No. 17 Mississippi State ‍‍‍^{y}	14	–	16	.467	38	–	25	.603
Alabama ‍‍‍^{y}	14	–	16	.467	35	–	28	.556
Auburn ‍‍‍	14	–	16	.467	29	–	29	.500
LSU ‍‍‍	13	–	17	.433	36	–	20	.643
Ole Miss ‍‍‍	13	–	17	.433	30	–	25	.545
x – Division champion † – Conference champion ‡ – Tournament champion y – Invited to the NCAA tournament As of June 28, 2011; Rankings from Baseball America

The 2011 Florida Gators baseball team represented the University of Florida in the sport of baseball during the 2011 college baseball season. The Gators competed in Division I of the National Collegiate Athletic Association (NCAA) and the Eastern Division of the Southeastern Conference (SEC). They played their home games at Alfred A. McKethan Stadium, on the university's Gainesville, Florida campus. The team was coached by Kevin O'Sullivan, who was in his fourth season at Florida.

The Gators began the season looking to improve upon their appearance in the 2010 College World Series, where they were eliminated after their first two games. After winning the SEC tournament, the Gators advanced to the best-of-three 2011 College World Series Finals, where they were defeated by South Carolina in two games.

== Roster ==
2011 Florida Gators baseball team
Players
Coaches

#	Pos.	Name	B/T	Height	Weight	Year	Home town
2	INF	Josh Adams	R/R	5 ft 11 in (1.8 m)	205 lb (93 kg)	Sr	Jacksonville, FL
29	RHP	Matt Campbell	R/R	6 ft 2 in (1.88 m)	200 lb (91 kg)	Sr	Tampa, FL
23	RHP	Jonathon Crawford	R/R	6 ft 1 in (1.85 m)	200 lb (91 kg)	Fr	Okeechobee, FL
20	INF	Cody Dent	L/R	5 ft 11 in (1.8 m)	185 lb (84 kg)	So	Boynton Beach, FL
16	RHP	Anthony DeSclafani	R/R	6 ft 2 in (1.88 m)	195 lb (88 kg)	Jr	Freehold, NJ
4	INF	Nolan Fontana	L/R	5 ft 11 in (1.8 m)	190 lb (86 kg)	So	Winter Garden, FL
9	INF	Alex Freedman	S/R	5 ft 10 in (1.78 m)	185 lb (84 kg)	Fr	Davie, FL
6	LHP	Daniel Gibson	L/L	6 ft 3 in (1.91 m)	220 lb (100 kg)	Fr	Lutz, FL
27	RHP	Michael Heller	R/R	6 ft 2 in (1.88 m)	195 lb (88 kg)	So	Bradenton, FL
35	LHP	Brian Johnson	L/L	6 ft 3 in (1.91 m)	225 lb (102 kg)	So	Cocoa Beach, FL
28	RHP	Keenan Kish	L/R	6 ft 3 in (1.91 m)	200 lb (91 kg)	Fr	Worcester, PA
37	RHP	Greg Larson	R/R	6 ft 8 in (2.03 m)	225 lb (102 kg)	Jr	Longwood, FL
10	INF	Austin Maddox	R/R	6 ft 3 in (1.91 m)	225 lb (102 kg)	So	Jacksonville, FL
26	LHP	Nick Maronde	S/L	6 ft 3 in (1.91 m)	200 lb (91 kg)	Jr	Lexington, KY
15	C	Ben McMahan	R/R	6 ft 0 in (1.83 m)	200 lb (91 kg)	Jr	Windermere, FL
17	OF	Connor Mitchell	L/R	6 ft 0 in (1.83 m)	175 lb (79 kg)	Fr	Tampa, FL
41	INF	Jeff Moyer	L/R	5 ft 11 in (1.8 m)	185 lb (84 kg)	Jr	Winter Springs, FL
44	INF	Tyler Palmer	R/R	5 ft 11 in (1.8 m)	190 lb (86 kg)	Fr	Pembroke Pines, FL
24	LHP	Alex Panteliodis	L/L	6 ft 2 in (1.88 m)	230 lb (104 kg)	Jr	Tampa, FL
8	OF	Daniel Pigott	R/R	6 ft 2 in (1.88 m)	205 lb (93 kg)	Jr	Ormond Beach, FL
21	RHP	Justin Poovey	R/R	6 ft 0 in (1.83 m)	200 lb (91 kg)	Jr	Granite Falls, NC
5	INF	Zack Powers	L/R	6 ft 3 in (1.91 m)	200 lb (91 kg)	Fr	Seffner, FL
30	INF	Vickash Ramjit	R/R	6 ft 3 in (1.91 m)	215 lb (98 kg)	RS So	Miami, FL
11	RHP	Hudson Randall	R/R	6 ft 3 in (1.91 m)	185 lb (84 kg)	So	Atlanta, GA
32	LHP	Steven Rodriguez	L/L	6 ft 2 in (1.88 m)	225 lb (102 kg)	So	Miami, FL
1	INF	Bryson Smith	R/R	6 ft 2 in (1.88 m)	195 lb (88 kg)	Sr	Watkinsville, GA
18	OF	Tyler Thompson	L/R	6 ft 1 in (1.85 m)	190 lb (86 kg)	Jr	Tequesta, FL
12	INF	Jacob Tillotson	S/R	6 ft 1 in (1.85 m)	190 lb (86 kg)	Fr	Tampa, FL
13	RHP	Tommy Toledo	L/R	6 ft 3 in (1.91 m)	190 lb (86 kg)	Jr	Tampa, FL
25	INF	Preston Tucker	L/L	6 ft 0 in (1.83 m)	215 lb (98 kg)	Jr	Tampa, FL
14	OF	Kamm Washington	L/L	5 ft 10 in (1.78 m)	180 lb (82 kg)	So	Boynton Beach, FL
22	RHP	Karsten Whitson	R/R	6 ft 4 in (1.93 m)	215 lb (98 kg)	So	Chipley, FL
31	OF	Paul Wilson	R/R	6 ft 0 in (1.83 m)	185 lb (84 kg)	RS Jr	Lakeland, FL
3	C	Mike Zunino	R/R	6 ft 2 in (1.88 m)	215 lb (98 kg)	So	Cape Coral, FL

Head coach

7 Kevin O'Sullivan

Assistant coach(es)

33 Craig Bell
42 Brad Weitzel

Legend

- (C) Team captain
- (S) Suspended
- (I) Ineligible
- Injured
- Current redshirt

Roster

== Schedule ==
2011 Florida Gators baseball game log
Regular season
February

Date	Opponent	Rank	Stadium Site	Score	Win	Loss	Save	Attendance	Overall Record	SEC Record
February 18	South Florida	No. 3	McKethan Stadium	7–2	Johnson (1–0)	Fontanez (0–1)	None	5,157	1–0	–
February 19	South Florida	No. 3	McKethan Stadium	4–1	Randall (1–0)	Barbosa (0–1)	Toledo (1)	4,994	2–0	–
February 20	South Florida	No. 3	McKethan Stadium	5–0	Whitson (1–0)	Gonzalez (0–1)	None	3,852	3–0	–
February 22	vs. Florida Atlantic	No. 3	Roger Dean Stadium; Jupiter, FL	13–2	DeSclafani (1–0)	Gonzaga (1–1)	None	3,043	4–0	–
February 24	Boston College	No. 3	McKethan Stadium	4–0	Johnson (2–0)	Dennhardt (0–1)	Rodriguez (1)	2,553	5–0	–
February 25	Boston College	No. 3	McKethan Stadium	9–3	Gibson (1–0)	Prohovich (0–1)	None	4,222	6–0	–
February 27	Boston College	No. 3	McKethan Stadium	7–2	Whitson (2–0)	Leonard (1–1)	None	4,213	7–0	–

March

Date	Opponent	Rank	Stadium Site	Score	Win	Loss	Save	Attendance	Overall Record	SEC Record
March 1	vs. No. 6 Florida State; Rivalry	No. 1	Steinbrenner Field; Tampa, FL	3–5	Sitz (2–0)	Toledo (0–1)	McGee (1)	7,869	7–1	–
March 4	Miami (FL); Rivalry	No. 1	McKethan Stadium	8–3	Johnson (3–0)	Radziewski (1–1)	None	4,587	8–1	–
March 5	Miami (FL); Rivalry	No. 1	McKethan Stadium	1–0	DeSclafani (2–0)	Encinosa (0–2)	None	4,851	9–1	–
March 6	Miami (FL); Rivalry	No. 1	McKethan Stadium	5–3	Toledo (1–1)	Whaley (2–1)	DeSclafani (1)	4,114	10–1	–
March 8	Georgia Southern	No. 1	McKethan Stadium	0–7	Adams (3–1)	Larson (0–1)	Murray (2)	2,733	10–2	–
March 9	at South Florida	No. 1	USF Baseball Stadium; Tampa, FL	8–1	Panteliodis (1–0)	Carlin (0–1)	None	3,211	11–2	–
March 11	Rhode Island	No. 1	McKethan Stadium	11–5	Johnson (4–0)	Pickering (2–1)	None	2,849	12–2	–
March 12	Rhode Island	No. 1	McKethan Stadium	12–4	Randall (2–0)	Graveline (2–2)	None	3,087	13–2	–
March 13	Rhode Island	No. 1	McKethan Stadium	8–6	Whitson (3–0)	Peterson (0–3)	DeSclafani (2)	3,058	14–2	–
March 15	No. 4 Florida State; Rivalry	No. 1	McKethan Stadium	5–4^{10}	DeSclafani (3–0)	McGee (0–1)	None	5,930	15–2	–
March 18	at No. 7 LSU	No. 1	Alex Box Stadium; Baton Rouge, LA	5–4	Toledo (2–1)	Ott (0–1)	DeSclafani (3)	12,076	16–2	1–0
March 19	at No. 7 LSU	No. 1	Alex Box Stadium	1–0	Randall (3–0)	Gausman (2–1)	Maronde (1)	11,703	17–2	2–0
March 20	at No. 7 LSU	No. 1	Alex Box Stadium	7–3	Maddox (1–0)	Alsup (3–2)	None	10,783	18–2	3–0
March 22	Winthrop	No. 1	McKethan Stadium	22–5	Rodriguez (1–0)	Newman (0–2)	None	3,008	19–2	–
March 23	Winthrop	No. 1	McKethan Stadium	10–0	Panteliodis (2–0)	Pierpont (0–2)	None	2,847	20–2	–
March 25	No. 4 South Carolina	No. 1	McKethan Stadium	2–9	Roth (5–1)	Johnson (4–1)	None	5,586	20–3	3–1
March 26	No. 4 South Carolina	No. 1	McKethan Stadium	2–1	Randall (4–0)	Price (1–2)	None	4,859	21–3	4–1
March 27	No. 4 South Carolina	No. 1	McKethan Stadium	3–4	Price (2–2)	Toledo (2–2)	None	4,393	21–4	4–2
March 29	vs. No. 7 Florida State; Rivalry	No. 3	Baseball Grounds; Jacksonville, FL	2–5	Sitz (3–1)	Rodriguez (1–1)	McGee (4)	10,078	21–5	–

April

Date	Opponent	Rank	Stadium Site	Score	Win	Loss	Save	Attendance	Overall Record	SEC Record
April 1	Tennessee	No. 3	McKethan Stadium	3–0	Randall (5–0)	Catapano (2–1)	None	4,222	22–5	5–2
April 2	Tennessee	No. 3	McKethan Stadium	11–2	DeSclafani (4–0)	Gruver (3–3)	None	3,726	23–5	6–2
April 3	Tennessee	No. 3	McKethan Stadium	9–1	Whitson (4–0)	Ramsey (0–1)	None	4,121	24–5	7–2
April 5	UCF	No. 4	McKethan Stadium	3–4	Hicks (2–1)	DeSclafani (4–1)	Richardson (1)	3,049	24–6	–
April 8	at Mississippi State	No. 4	Dudy Noble Field; Starkville, MS	5–7	Stark (2–0)	Randall (5–1)	Reed (5)	7,140	24–7	7–3
April 9	at Mississippi State	No. 4	Dudy Noble Field	18–0	Johnson (5–1)	Stratton (4–3)	None	11,201	25–7	8–3
April 10	at Mississippi State	No. 4	Dudy Noble Field	3–1	Rodriguez (2–1)	Pollorena (3–1)	Maddox (1)	6,453	26–7	9–3
April 12	at No. 8 Florida State; Rivalry	No. 4	Dick Howser Stadium; Tallahassee, FL	1–3	Scantling (2–0)	Panteliodis (2–1)	Bennett (2)	6,357	26–8	–
April 15	at Georgia	No. 4	Foley Field; Athens, GA	5–4	Randall (6–1)	Wood (4–4)	Rodriguez (2)	2,432	27–8	10–3
April 16	at Georgia	No. 4	Foley Field	2–7	Palazzone (6–1)	DeSclafani (4–2)	None	3,011	27–9	10–4
April 17	at Georgia	No. 4	Foley Field	14–7	Larson (1–1)	Dieterich (1–2)	None	3,004	28–9	11–4
April 20	at UCF	No. 5	Jay Bergman Field; Orlando, FL	6–8	Bradford (3–1)	Toledo (2–3)	None	3,601	28–10	–
April 22	Alabama	No. 5	McKethan Stadium	7–0	Randall (7–1)	Kilcrease (5–3)	None	4,206	29–10	12–4
April 23	Alabama	No. 5	McKethan Stadium	9–2	Johnson (6–1)	Morgan (4–4)	None	4,917	30–10	13–4
April 24	Alabama	No. 5	McKethan Stadium	2–1	Whitson (5–0)	Smart (2–1)	Maronde (2)	2,759	31–10	14–4
April 29	Ole Miss	No. 4	McKethan Stadium	9–3	Randall (8–1)	Crouse (6–3)	None	3,739	32–10	15–4
April 30	Ole Miss	No. 4	McKethan Stadium	8–1	Johnson (7–1)	Goforth (3–6)	None	4,305	33–10	16–4

May

Date	Opponent	Rank	Stadium Site	Score	Win	Loss	Save	Attendance	Overall Record	SEC Record
May 1	Ole Miss	No. 4	McKethan Stadium	7–2	Whitson (6–0)	Wright (4–4)	None	3,240	34–10	17–4
May 3	Bethune–Cookman	No. 4	McKethan Stadium	11–0	Panteliodis (3–1)	Gonzalez (0–3)	None	2,582	35–10	–
May 5	at No. 18 Arkansas	No. 4	Baum Stadium; Fayetteville, AR	3–4	Baxendale (7–1)	Randall (8–2)	None	7,120	35–11	17–5
May 6	at No. 18 Arkansas	No. 4	Baum Stadium	3–5	Fant (2–3)	Johnson (7–2)	Astin (1)	9,286	35–12	17–6
May 7	at No. 18 Arkansas	No. 4	Baum Stadium	5–3	Maddox (2–0)	Sanburn (2–4)	None	9,862	36–12	18–6
May 11	North Florida	No. 5	McKethan Stadium	4–1	Panteliodis (4–1)	Organ (4–1)	Campbell (1)	2,928	37–12	–
May 13	at No. 2 Vanderbilt	No. 5	Hawkins Field; Nashville, TN	6–5	DeSclafani (5–2)	Moore (4–2)	Maddox (2)	3,541	38–12	19–6
May 14	at No. 2 Vanderbilt	No. 5	Hawkins Field	1–14	Garvin (11–1)	Johnson (7–3)	None	3,220	38–13	19–7
May 15	at No. 2 Vanderbilt	No. 5	Hawkins Field	6–3^{12}	Toledo (3–3)	Armstrong (0–1)	None	3,248	39–13	20–7
May 17	Jacksonville	No. 4	McKethan Stadium	2–11	Tomshaw (7–3)	Panteliodis (4–2)	None	2,987	39–14	–
May 19	Kentucky	No. 4	McKethan Stadium	9–6	Johnson (8–3)	Rogers (3–7)	Maddox (3)	3,164	40–14	21–7
May 20	Kentucky	No. 4	McKethan Stadium	1–14	Meyer (7–5)	Randall (8–3)	None	3,990	40–15	21–8
May 21	Kentucky	No. 4	McKethan Stadium	19–3	Whitson (7–0)	Littrell (6–6)	None	3,754	41–15	22–8

Postseason
SEC Tournament

Date	Opponent	Rank	Stadium Site	Score	Win	Loss	Save	Attendance	Overall Record	SECT Record
May 25	vs. Mississippi State	No. 5	Regions Park; Hoover, AL	7–5	Rodriguez (3–1)	Pollorena (6–5)	Maddox (4)	8,392	42–15	1–0
May 26	vs. Alabama	No. 5	Regions Park	6–0	Randall (9–3)	Morgan (5–6)	None	7,123	43–15	2–0
May 28 (1)	vs. Georgia	No. 5	Regions Park	3–4	Palazzone (10–4)	DeSclafani (5–3)	Maloof (18)	7,205	43–16	2–1
May 28 (2)	vs. Georgia	No. 5	Regions Park	3–2	Toledo (4–3)	Swegman (1–1)	Maddox (5)	1,486	44–16	3–1
May 29	vs. No. 2 Vanderbilt	No. 5	Regions Park	5–0	Panteliodis (5–2)	Hill (4–1)	None	7,845	45–16	4–1

NCAA tournament: Gainesville Regional

Date	Opponent	Rank	Stadium Site	Score	Win	Loss	Save	Attendance	Overall Record	Regional Record
June 3	Manhattan	No. 3	McKethan Stadium	17–3	Whitson (8–0)	Soldinger (10–3)	None	2,339	46–16	1–0
June 4	No. 23 Miami (FL)	No. 3	McKethan Stadium	5–4	Toledo (5–3)	Miller (2–2)	None	3,565	47–16	2–0
June 5	No. 23 Miami (FL)	No. 3	McKethan Stadium	11–4	Panteliodis (6–2)	Encinosa (5–6)	None	2,937	48–16	3–0

NCAA tournament: Gainesville Super Regional

Date	Opponent	Rank	Stadium Site	Score	Win	Loss	Save	Attendance	Overall Record	Super Reg. Record
June 10	Mississippi State	No. 3	McKethan Stadium	11–1	Randall (10–3)	Mitchell (6–2)	None	2,446	49–16	1–0
June 11	Mississippi State	No. 3	McKethan Stadium	3–4	Reed (1–1)	Rodriguez (3–2)	None	4,223	49–17	1–1
June 12	Mississippi State	No. 3	McKethan Stadium	8–6	Toledo	Reed (1–2)	None	3,812	50–17	2–1

College World Series

Date	Opponent	Rank	Stadium Site	Score	Win	Loss	Save	Attendance	Overall Record	CWS Record
June 18	vs. No. 5 Texas	No. 3	TD Ameritrade Park; Omaha, NE	8–4	Randall (11–3)	Jungmann (13–3)	Maronde (3)	25,521	51–17	1–0
June 21	vs. No. 2 Vanderbilt	No. 3	TD Ameritrade Park	3–1	Rodriguez (4–2)	Garvin (13–2)	None	20,182	52–17	2–0
June 24	vs. No. 2 Vanderbilt	No. 3	TD Ameritrade Park	6–4	Maddox (3–0)	Gray (12–4)	None	20,087	53–17	3–0
Finals										Record
June 27	vs. No. 4 South Carolina	No. 3	TD Ameritrade Park	1–2^{11}	Taylor (8–1)	Maronde (0–1)	Price (19)	25,851	53–18	0–1
June 28	vs. No. 4 South Carolina	No. 3	TD Ameritrade Park	2–5	Roth (14–3)	Whitson (8–1)	Price (20)	26,721	53–19	0–2

Rankings from USA Today/ESPN Coaches' Poll. All times Eastern. Retrieved from FloridaGators.com

== Rankings ==
Ranking movement
Poll	Pre- season	Week 2	Week 3	Week 4	Week 5	Week 6	Week 7	Week 8	Week 9	Week 10	Week 11	Week 12	Week 13	Week 14	Week 15	Week 16	Final Poll
USA Today/ESPN Coaches' (Top 25)	3	3	1	1	1	1	3	4	4	5	4	4	5	4	5	3	2

- NR = Not ranked

== See also ==
- Florida Gators
- List of Florida Gators baseball players
