= Teurlings Catholic High School =

Location
- 139 Teurlings Drive; Lafayette, (Lafayette Parish), Louisiana 70501; United States; 30°14′24″N 91°59′25″W

Information
- Type: Private, Coeducational
- Motto: To Channel His Spirit
- Religious affiliation: Catholic
- Established: 1955
- Founder: William J. Teurlings
- Authority: Diocese of Lafayette
- Principal: Lauren Schomaker
- Chancellor: Fr. Kyle White
- Chaplain: Fr. Reed Bellingham
- Grades: 9–12
- Colors: Red, navy and white
- Team name: Rebels
- Rival: St. Thomas More of Lafayette, Louisiana
- Accreditation: Cognia School of Distinction 2022
- Admissions Director: Tiffany Parks
- Athletic Director: Joe Heintz
- Website: www.tchs.net

Teurlings Catholic High School is a private, Roman Catholic high school in the Roman Catholic Diocese of Lafayette, Lafayette, Louisiana, US.

== Background ==
Teurlings Catholic High School was established in 1955 as Father Teurlings High School. Father William J. Teurlings was the pastor who envisioned the school and arranged for the purchase of the property the school sits on. The school opened shortly before his death in 1957. In the early 1950s, Monsignor William J. Teurlings, a pioneering priest in the Diocese of Lafayette, recognized the need for a Catholic high school to serve the families of St. Genevieve Parish and the growing northside of Lafayette. Guided by faith and the support of the community, he secured the land that would become the foundation of the school. Though Monsignor Teurlings did not live to see the school fully realized, his vision came to life when Father Teurlings High School opened its doors in 1955. The school quickly grew, expanding its programs and facilities and earning full accreditation as a four-year high school by 1959. As its mission and reach evolved, the school became known as Teurlings Catholic High School, reflecting its strong Catholic identity and commitment to forming the whole student.

== Mission ==
Teurlings Catholic High School describes its educational mission as being grounded in the Catholic faith, with an emphasis on academic education, community life, and spiritual formation. The school identifies Communion, Virtue, Truth, and Mercy as its four institutional values.

== Feeder schools ==
Most students feed from the following schools (located in Lafayette unless otherwise noted):

- Sts. Leo Seton Catholic School
- St. Genevieve Middle School
- St. Bernard School (Breaux Bridge)
- Carencro Catholic School (Carencro)
- St. Peter & Paul Catholic School (Scott)
- St. Ignatius (Grand Coteau)

Though they are not recognized as feeder schools, some students come from schools such as Our Lady of Fatima, St. Pius X, St. Cecilia School (Broussard), Cathedral Carmel School, and various public schools around Lafayette Parish.

== Academics ==
Teurlings Catholic offers a college-preparatory curriculum designed to challenge students and prepare them for success beyond high school. Academic programs are intentionally structured to promote critical thinking, discipline, and intellectual growth. Students complete a structured four-year curriculum including English, mathematics, science, social studies, religious studies, world language, and electives in alignment with TOPS University Diploma requirements.

The scholastic year is divided into four quarters. The grade for each quarter is based on daily assignments, class participation, quizzes, and tests. (Extra credit work assigned after the end of the quarter is not allowed.) In the computation of the student’s quarter, semester, and final grade, only the one-digit fraction of .5 or greater is automatically rounded to the next higher number. Semester grades are determined by averaging the two-quarter numerical grades (80%) and the semester exam grade (20%). The final grade in any course is the average of the two-semester numerical grades. A numerical average of 60% or better is required to receive credit. Students who do not meet the attendance requirements will not receive credit for the course.

All students’ grades (report cards, transcripts) will be reported on a 4.0 scale. School awards and Honor Graduate distinctions will also use the 4.0 scale. Students will earn an extra quality point for a grade of A, B, or C in state-designated Honors and Dual Enrollment classes taken in the 11-12th grade when calculating the TOPS GPA.

== Athletics ==
Teurlings Catholic athletics competes in the LHSAA. Athletics at Teurlings Catholic High School are rooted in the belief that sports help shape the whole student. Student-athletes are challenged to grow in discipline, teamwork, and integrity while learning to compete with respect and humility. Guided by the school's core values of communion, truth, virtue, and mercy, athletics emphasize servant leadership, sportsmanship, and personal responsibility. Participation in sports encourages students to balance academic success with physical balance academic success with physical fitness, build lasting friendships, and develop habits of hard work and perseverance that extend beyond the field and into everyday life.

== Board of Pastors ==
Teurlings Catholic High School is a high school of nine parishes: St. Charles Borromeo, St. Genevieve, St. Elizabeth Seton, St. Leo the Great, St. Peter Roman Catholic, St. Bernard, St. Patrick, Our Lady of the Assumption and Sts. Peter and Paul. These parishes own and operate Teurlings Catholic High School. The Pastors of these parishes form a Board, which advises one of their members designated and appointed by the Bishop of Lafayette as Chancellor, in the ecclesiastical administration of the school. The Chancellor, counseled by the Board of Pastors and responsive to the Board in business which involves parish funds, is Pastor of Teurlings Catholic High School. The Chancellor is present to the Teurlings Catholic Advisory Council, but not as a member. The Advisory Council is advisory to the Chancellor. Policies formulated by and emanating from the Teurlings Catholic Advisory Council becomes effective by ratification of the Chancellor.

- Reverend Kyle White
  - TCHS Chancellor, St. Leo the Great, Lafayette
- Reverend Reed Bellingham
  - TCHS Chaplain, St. Catherine of Alexandria Catholic Church, St. John Francis Regis Catholic Church, Arnaudville
- Reverend Travis Abadie
  - Co-Owner Pastor, St. Elizabeth Seton, Lafayette
- Very Reverend Monsignor Ron Broussard
  - Co-Owner Pastor, Our Lady of the Assumption, Carencro
- Reverend Chris Cambre
  - Co-Owner Pastor, St. Peter Roman Catholic, Carencro
- Reverend Mark Derise
  - Co-Owner Pastor, Sts. Peter and Paul, Scott
- Reverend Josh Guillory
  - Co-Owner Pastor, St. Patrick, Lafayette
- Reverend Garrett McIntyre
  - Co-Owner Pastor, St. Bernard, Breaux Bridge
- Reverend Aaron Melancon
  - Co-Owner Pastor, St. Charles Borromeo, Grand Coteau
- Reverend Brian Taylor
  - Co-Owner Pastor, St. Genevieve, Lafayette

== Notable alumni ==
- David Begnaud, CBS News
- Kacie Cryer, basketball coach
- Jake Delhomme, football player
- Taylor Dugas, baseball player
