= 2011 Vanderbilt Commodores baseball team =

American college baseball season

2011 Vanderbilt Commodores baseball

College World Series, 2–2
- Conference: Southeastern Conference
- Eastern Division
- Record: 54–12 (22–8 SEC)
- Head coach: Tim Corbin (9th season)
- Home stadium: Hawkins Field

2011 Southeastern Conference baseball standings
	Conf.				Overall
Team	W		L	PCT	W		L	PCT
Eastern
No. 1 South Carolina ^{x}‍†‍‍^{y}	22	–	8	.733	55	–	14	.797
No. 2 Florida ^{x}‍†‍‡‍^{y}	22	–	8	.733	53	–	19	.736
No. 4 Vanderbilt ^{x}‍†‍‍^{y}	22	–	8	.733	54	–	12	.818
Georgia ‍‍‍^{y}	16	–	14	.533	33	–	32	.508
Kentucky ‍‍‍	8	–	22	.267	25	–	30	.455
Tennessee ‍‍‍	7	–	23	.233	25	–	29	.463
Western
No. 24 Arkansas ^{x}‍‍‍^{y}	15	–	15	.500	40	–	22	.645
No. 17 Mississippi State ‍‍‍^{y}	14	–	16	.467	38	–	25	.603
Alabama ‍‍‍^{y}	14	–	16	.467	35	–	28	.556
Auburn ‍‍‍	14	–	16	.467	29	–	29	.500
LSU ‍‍‍	13	–	17	.433	36	–	20	.643
Ole Miss ‍‍‍	13	–	17	.433	30	–	25	.545
x – Division champion † – Conference champion ‡ – Tournament champion y – Invited to the NCAA tournament As of June 28, 2011; Rankings from Baseball America

The 2011 Vanderbilt Commodores baseball team represented Vanderbilt University in the 2011 NCAA Division I baseball season. The team played its home games at Hawkins Field in Nashville, Tennessee. The team was coached by Tim Corbin in his ninth season at Vanderbilt.

The Commodores reached the 2011 College World Series, falling in the semifinals to runner-up Florida.

== Regionals ==
The Commodores were announced as a host for the Nashville regional, which featured #6 national seed Vanderbilt, Oklahoma State, Troy, and fellow Nashville university Belmont. Vanderbilt marched through the regional, defeating 4 seed Belmont 10–0, 3 seed Troy 10–2, and Belmont again in the final by the score of 6–1. A year later, Vanderbilt coach Josh Holliday would become the head coach of his alma mater and 2011 regional participant, Oklahoma State University.

In the SuperRegional, Vanderbilt drew the winner of the Corvallis regional, Oregon State. With first-round draft pick Sonny Gray on the mound, the Commodores jumped out to a quick 4–0 lead in the first before coasting to an 11–1 win. Mike Yastrzemski hit a three-run home run in the 4th inning.

The second game of the series also went the way of the Commodores, led by first baseman Aaron Westlake's three home runs. Vanderbilt defeated the Beavers 9–3 to punch their first to the College World Series, the first in the history of the school.

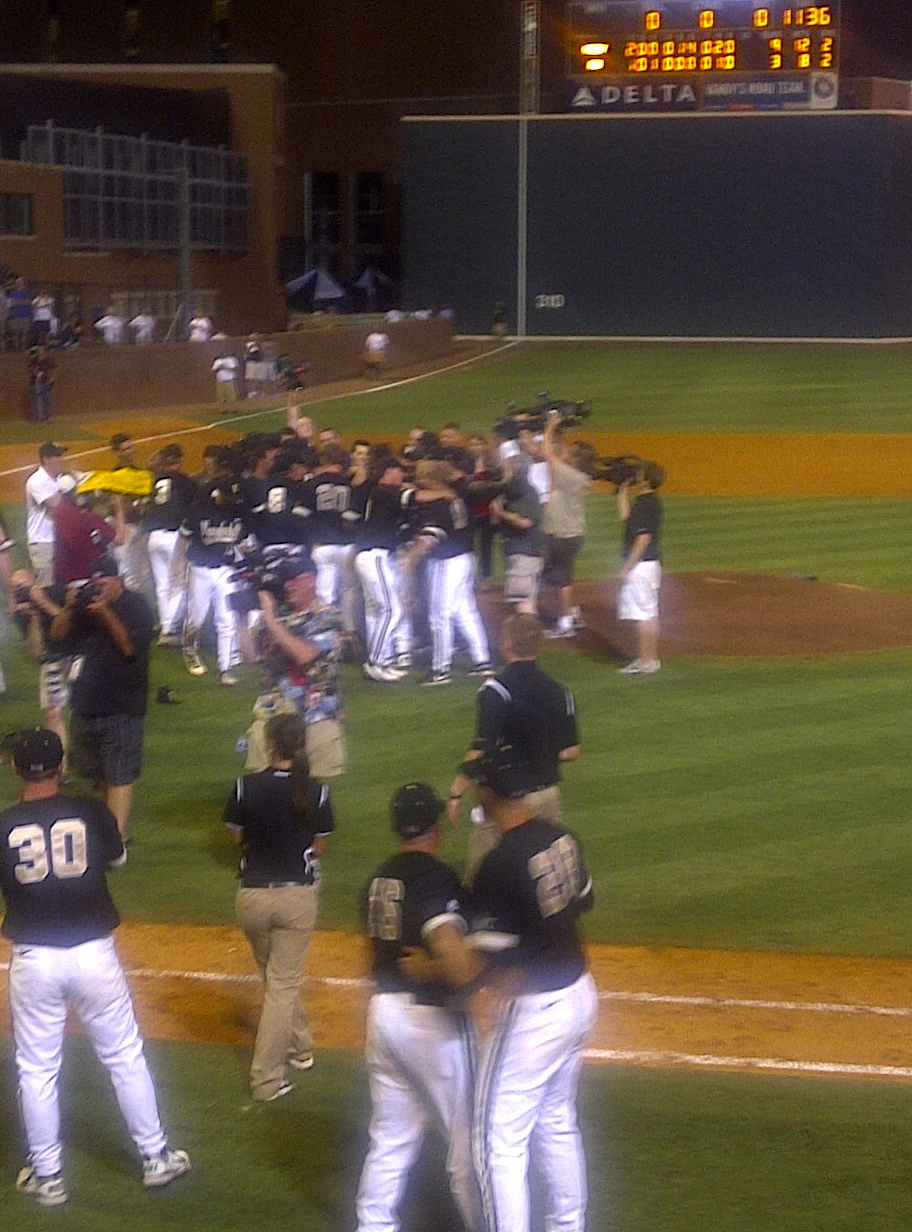
Vanderbilt celebrates the Super Regional win

== Personnel ==
=== Roster ===
2011 Vanderbilt Commodores roster
Pitchers: 2 - Sonny Gray - Junior; 10 - Navery Moore - Junior; 12 - Ryan O’Connor - Freshman; 19 - Steven Rice - Freshman; 21 - Jack Armstrong - Junior; 24 - Corey Williams - Sophomore; 27 - Keenan Kolinsky - Freshman; 28 - Grayson Garvin - Junior; 31 - Robert Hansen - Freshman; 33 - Jake Harper - Freshman; 34 - Taylor Hill - Senior; 35 - Kevin Ziomek - Freshman; 39 - Sam Selman - Sophomore; 40 - T.J. Pecoraro - Freshman; 44 - Mark Lamm - Senior; 46 - Will Clinard - Sophomore	Catchers: 5 - Spencer Navin - Freshman; 9 - Curt Casali - Senior; 45 - Drew Fann - Junior; Infielders: 1 - Bryan Johns - Senior; 3 - Sam Lind - Sophomore; 8 - Riley Reynolds - Junior; 11 - Josh Lee - Freshman; 13 - Anthony Gomez - Sophomore; 15 - Will Johnson - Freshman; 17 - Andrew Harris - Sophomore; 22 - Jason Esposito - Junior; 25 - D.J. Luna - Sophomore; 42 - Joel McKeithan - Freshman; 55 - Conrad Gregor - Freshman	Outfielders: 6 - Tony Kemp - Freshman; 7 - Joe Loftus - Junior; 18 - Mike Yastrzemski - Sophomore; 20 - Connor Harrell - Sophomore; 51 - Jack Lupo - Sophomore; Utility: 36 - Aaron Westlake - Junior

=== Coaches ===
2011 Vanderbilt Commodores baseball coaching staff
- 4 - Tim Corbin – Head coach
- 16 - Derek Johnson - Associate head coach
- - Josh Holliday - Assistant coach
- 30 - Larry Day - Volunteer assistant coach

== Schedule ==
2011 Vanderbilt Commodores baseball game log
Regular season

February
Date	Opponent	Site/stadium	Score	Win	Loss	Save	Attendance	Overall record	SEC record
February 18	@ San Diego	Fowler Park • San Diego, CA	W 4–3^{5}	Gray (1–0)	Jensen (0–1)	Clinard (1)	400	1–0	
February 19	@ San Diego State	Tony Gwynn Stadium • San Diego, CA	W 7–3	Lamm (1–0)	Rasmussen (0–1)	None	471	2–0	
February 20	@ San Diego	Fowler Park • San Diego, CA	W 3–1	Hill (1–0)	Youpel (0–1)	Moore (1)	532	3–0	
February 20	@ San Diego	Fowler Park • San Diego, CA	W 7–3	Garvin (1–0)	Paez (0–1)	None	532	4–0	
February 23	Belmont	Hawkins Field • Nashville, TN	W 6–2	Pecoraro (1–0)	Fanchier (0–1)	Clinard (2)	1,794	5–0	
February 25	Stanford	Hawkins Field • Nashville, TN	W 2–1	Gray (2–0)	Appel (0–1)	Moore (2)	1,942	6–0	
February 26	Stanford	Hawkins Field • Nashville, TN	W 8–7	Lamm (2–0)	Snodgress (1–1)	Moore (3)	2,701	7–0	
February 27	Stanford	Hawkins Field • Nashville, TN	L 2–5	Pries (2–0)	Garvin (1–1)	Reed (1)	2,015	7–1	

March
Date	Opponent	Site/stadium	Score	Win	Loss	Save	Attendance	Overall record	SEC record
March 1	WKU	Hawkins Field • Nashville, TN	W 6–5	Moore (1–0)	Davis (1–1)	None	1,859	8–1	
March 4	Brown	Hawkins Field • Nashville, TN	W 3–1	Gray (3–0)	Bakowski (0–1)	None	1,822	9–1	
March 6	Brown	Hawkins Field • Nashville, TN	W 6–5	Garvin (2–1)	Carlow (0–1)	Moore (4)		10–1	
March 6	Brown	Hawkins Field • Nashville, TN	W 6–3	Lamm (3–0)	Whitehill (0–1)	Williams (1)	1,895	11–1	
March 8	Wofford	Hawkins Field • Nashville, TN	W 12–1	Pecoraro (2–0)	Sheridan (0–1)	None	1,817	12–1	
March 9	Kennesaw State	Hawkins Field • Nashville, TN	W 9–5	Lamm (4–0)	Fream (0–1)	None	1,829	13–1	
March 11	UIC	Hawkins Field • Nashville, TN	W 5–1	Gray (4–0)	Salemi (0–2)	None	1,859	14–1	
March 12	UIC	Hawkins Field • Nashville, TN	W 9–8^{10}	Moore (2–0)	Ganek (0–1)	None	2,063	15–1	
March 13	UIC	Hawkins Field • Nashville, TN	W 2–1	Moore (3–0)	Hoffman (1–1)	None	1,913	16–1	
March 15	Purdue	Hawkins Field • Nashville, TN	W 9–0	Ziomek (1–0)	Haase (2–1)	None	1,791	17–1	
March 18	Mississippi State	Hawkins Field • Nashville, TN	W 10–0	Gray (5–0)	Jones (2–3)	None	2,820	18–1	1–0
March 19	Mississippi State	Hawkins Field • Nashville, TN	W 4–0	Garvin (3–1)	Stratton (3–1)	None	3,034	19–1	2–0
March 20	Mississippi State	Hawkins Field • Nashville, TN	L 8–9	Girodo (1–0)	Moore (3–1)	Stark (1)	2,752	19–2	2–1
March 22	Tennessee State	Hawkins Field • Nashville, TN	W 11–2	Pecoraro (3–0)	McWhirter (0–2)	None	2,398	20–2	
March 25	@ Arkansas	Baum Stadium • Fayetteville, AR	L 1–2	Baxendale (5–0)	Gray (5–1)	None	7,937	20–3	2–2
March 26	@ Arkansas	Baum Stadium • Fayetteville, AR	W 4–1	Garvin (4–1)	Astin (2–1)	Moore (5)	7,933	21–3	3–2
March 27	@ Arkansas	Baum Stadium • Fayetteville, AR	W 2–1	Hill (2–0)	Fant (1–2)	Moore (6)	6,634	22–3	4–2
March 29	Tennessee–Martin	Hawkins Field • Nashville, TN	W 11–2	Pecoraro (4–0)	Skubina (0–1)	None	1,867	23–3	

April
Date	Opponent	Site/stadium	Score	Win	Loss	Save	Attendance	Overall record	SEC record
April 1	@ Auburn	Samford Stadium – Hitchcock Field at Plainsman Park • Auburn, AL	W 11–6	Gray (6–1)	Morris (1–2)	None	3,546	24–3	5–2
April 2	@ Auburn	Samford Stadium – Hitchcock Field at Plainsman Park • Auburn, AL	W 11–2	Garvin (5–1)	Jacobs (1–2)	None	3,663	25–3	6–2
April 3	@ Auburn	Samford Stadium – Hitchcock Field at Plainsman Park • Auburn, AL	W 6–2	Clinard (1–0)	Wallen (1–3)	None	3,156	26–3	7–2
April 5	Middle Tennessee	Hawkins Field • Nashville, TN	W 9–1	Pecoraro (5–0)	McClung (1–1)	None	2,188	27–3	
April 8	Alabama	Hawkins Field • Nashville, TN	W 11–3	Gray (7–1)	Kilcrease (4–2)	None	3,118	28–3	8–2
April 9	Alabama	Hawkins Field • Nashville, TN	W 7–0	Garvin (6–1)	Morgan (4–2)	None	3,141	29–3	9–2
April 10	Alabama	Hawkins Field • Nashville, TN	W 11–6	Williams (1–0)	Pilkington (1–2)	None	3,357	30–3	10–2
April 12	@ Middle Tennessee	Reese Smith Jr. Field • Murfreesboro, TN	W 1–0	Pecoraro (6–0)	Drake (0–1)	Moore (7)	1,049	31–3	
April 15	@ South Carolina	Carolina Stadium • Columbia, SC	L 1–3	Roth (8–1)	Gray (7–2)	Price (11)	8,242	31–4	10–3
April 16	@ South Carolina	Carolina Stadium • Columbia, SC	W 6–4	Garvin (7–1)	Holmes (3–1)	Moore (8)	8,242	32–4	11–3
April 17	@ South Carolina	Carolina Stadium • Columbia, SC	L 3–5	Price (4–2)	Clinard (1–1)	None	8,242	32–5	11–4
April 22	LSU	Hawkins Field • Nashville, TN	W 11–3	Gray (8–2)	McCune (5–3)	None	3,541	33–5	12–4
April 23	LSU	Hawkins Field • Nashville, TN	W 10–1	Garvin (8–1)	Gausman (2–5)	None	3,541	34–5	13–4
April 24	LSU	Hawkins Field • Nashville, TN	W 10–7	Hill (3–0)	Alsup (5–4)	Moore (9)	2,706	35–5	14–4
April 29	Tennessee	Hawkins Field • Nashville, TN	W 10–1	Gray (9–2)	Gruver (4–5)	None	3,635	36–5	15–4
April 30	Tennessee	Hawkins Field • Nashville, TN	W 10–1	Garvin (9–1)	Reed (1–2)	None	3,054	37–5	16–4

May
Date	Opponent	Site/stadium	Score	Win	Loss	Save	Attendance	Overall record	SEC record
May 1	Tennessee	Hawkins Field • Nashville, TN	W 19–3	Hill (4–0)	Blount (1–2)	None	3,434	38–5	17–4
May 6	@ Kentucky	Cliff Hagan Stadium • Lexington, KY	L 0–2	Meyer (5–5)	Gray (9–3)	1,911	38–6	17–5	
May 7	@ Kentucky	Cliff Hagan Stadium • Lexington, KY	W 10–3	Garvin (10–1)	Littrell (5–5)	None	1,671	39–6	18–5
May 8	@ Kentucky	Cliff Hagan Stadium • Lexington, KY	W 6–3	Moore (4–1)	Phillips (1–2)	Williams (2)	1,871	40–6	19–5
May 10	@ Louisville	Jim Patterson Stadium • Louisville, KY	W 5–1	Ziomek (2–0)	Nastold (3–7)	None	1,944	41–6	
May 13	Florida	Hawkins Field • Nashville, TN	L 5–6	DeSclafani (5–2)	Moore (4–2)	Maddox (2)	3,541	41–7	19–6
May 14	Florida	Hawkins Field • Nashville, TN	W 14–1	Garvin (11–1)	Johnson (7–3)	None	3,220	42–7	20–6
May 15	Florida	Hawkins Field • Nashville, TN	L 6–3	Toledo (3–3)	Armstrong (0–1)	3,248	42–8	20–7	
May 19	@ Georgia	Foley Field • Athens, GA	L 4–5	Palazzone (9–3)	Clinard (1–2)	None	2,020	42–9	20–8
May 20	@ Georgia	Foley Field • Athens, GA	W 9–3	Pecoraro (7–0)	Wood (4–7)	Ziomek (1)	2,295	43–9	21–8
May 21	@ Georgia	Foley Field • Athens, GA	W 17–7	Lamm (5–0)	Maloof (2–2)	None	2,122	44–9	22–8

Postseason

SEC Tournament
Date	Opponent	Site/stadium	Score	Win	Loss	Save	Attendance	Overall record	SECT Record
May 25	Georgia	Regions Park • Hoover, AL	W 10–0^{7}	Ziomek (3–0)	Palazzone (9–4)	None	8,814	45–9	1–0
May 26	South Carolina	Regions Park • Hoover, AL	W 7–2	Gray (10–3)	Koumas (6–1)	Moore (10)	7,123	46–9	2–0
May 28	Arkansas	Regions Park • Hoover, AL	W 3–2	Garvin (12–1)	Lynch (4–4)	Moore (12)		47–9	3–0
May 29	Florida	Regions Park • Hoover, AL	L 0–5	Panteliodis (5–2)	Hill (4–1)	7,845	47–10	3–1	

NCAA tournament: Nashville Regional
Date	Opponent	Site/stadium	Score	Win	Loss	Save	Attendance	Overall record	NCAAT record
June 3	Belmont	Hawkins Field • Nashville, TN	W 10–0	Gray (11–3)	Hamann (9–2)	None	3,531	48–10	1–0
June 4	Troy	Hawkins Field • Nashville, TN	W 10–2	Garvin (13–1)	Hodgskin (3–7)	Clinard (3)	3,323	49–10	2–0
June 5	Belmont	Hawkins Field • Nashville, TN	W 6–1	Hill (5–1)	Buckelew (2–7)	None	3,050	50–10	3–0

NCAA tournament: Nashville Super Regional
Date	Opponent	Site/stadium	Score	Win	Loss	Save	Attendance	Overall record	NCAAT record
June 10	Oregon State	Hawkins Field • Nashville, TN	W 11–1	Gray (12–3)	Gaviglio (12–3)	None	3,349	51–10	4–0
June 11	Oregon State	Hawkins Field • Nashville, TN	W 9–3	Clinard (2–2)	Schultz (4–1)	None	3,387	52–10	5–0

College World Series
Date	Opponent	Site/stadium	Score	Win	Loss	Save	Attendance	Overall record	CWS record
June 18	North Carolina	Charles Schwab Field • Omaha, NE	W 7–3	Williams (2–2)	Johnson (13–2)	None	22,745	53–10	1–0
June 20	Florida	Charles Schwab Field • Omaha, NE	L 1–3	Rodriguez (4–2)	Garvin (13–2)	None	20,182	53–11	1–1
June 22	North Carolina	Charles Schwab Field • Omaha, NE	W 5–1	Hill (6–1)	Holt (7–2)	None	24,394	54–11	2–1
June 24	Florida	Charles Schwab Field • Omaha, NE	L 4–6	Maddox (3–0)	Gray (12–3)	None	20,087	54–12	2–2

== Ranking Movements ==
Ranking movements Legend: ██ Increase in ranking ██ Decrease in ranking
	Week																		
Poll	Pre	1	2	3	4	5	6	7	8	9	10	11	12	13	14	15	16	17	Final
Coaches'	4	4*	2	3	2	2	2	1	1	3	2	2	2	3	2	2			4
Baseball America	4	3	2	2	2	2	1	1	1	4	4	4	3	7	4	3			4
Collegiate Baseball^	5	4	3	3	3	2	2	2	2	3	3	3	2	5	3	3	3	3	5
NCBWA†	4	3	2	2	1	2	1	1	1	3	2	1	1	3	2	2		2	4

^ Collegiate Baseball ranked 40 teams in their preseason poll, but only ranked 30 teams weekly during the season.
† NCBWA ranks 30 teams in their preseason poll, but only ranks 25 teams weekly during the season.
* A new poll was not released for this week, so for comparison purposes, the previous week's ranking is inserted in this week's slot.
