= Nolan Fontana =

American baseball player (born 1991)

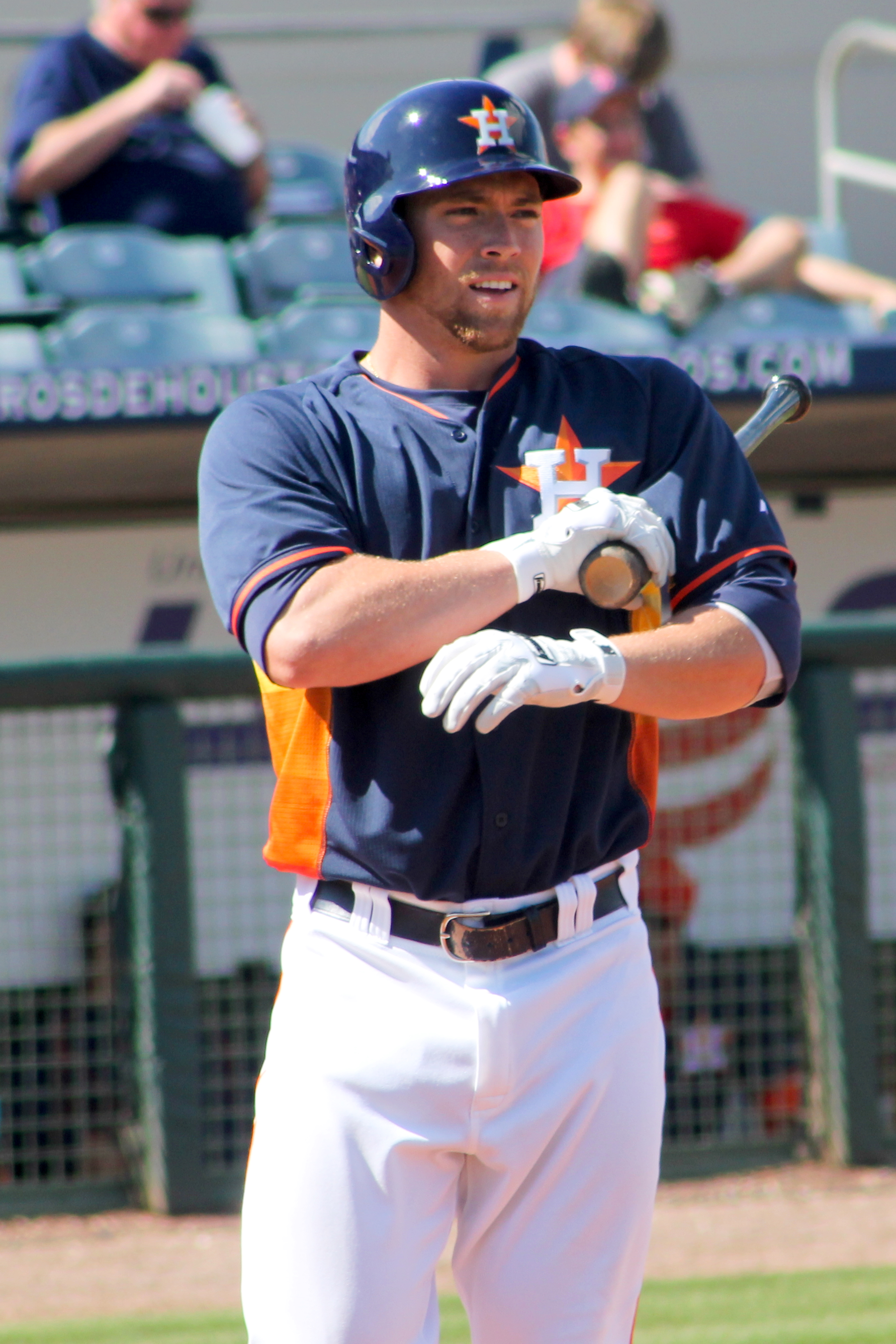
- Fontana at Houston Astros spring training in 2015
- Infielder
- Born: June 6, 1991 (age 35); Richardson, Texas, U.S.
- Batted: Left Threw: Right

MLB debut
- May 22, 2017, for the Los Angeles Angels

Last appearance
- June 15, 2018, for the Los Angeles Angels

MLB statistics
- Batting average: .065
- Home runs: 2
- Runs batted in: 2
- Stats at Baseball Reference

Teams
- Los Angeles Angels (2017–2018)
Medals
Men's baseball
Representing United States
World Junior Baseball Championship
Silver medal – second place	2008 Edmonton	Team

Nolan David Fontana (born June 6, 1991) is an American former professional baseball infielder. He played for the Los Angeles Angels of Major League Baseball (MLB). Before he began his professional career, he attended the University of Florida, and played college baseball for the Florida Gators.

== Early life ==
Fontana was born in Richardson, Texas, but was raised in Winter Garden, Florida. He played Little League Baseball in Pine Hills, Florida. As a nine-year-old playing in the 12-and-under division, he did not strikeout once until the final game of the year.

Fontana attended West Orange High School in Winter Garden. In 2008, he played in a regional final despite having mononucleosis.

== Amateur career ==
Fontana enrolled at the University of Florida, where he played for the Florida Gators baseball team in the Southeastern Conference (SEC) of the National Collegiate Athletic Association's Division I. As a freshman, he had a .287 batting average, and committed only four errors. He won a Gold Glove Award for his defensive play, and was named a Freshman All-American. Fontana played for the United States national collegiate baseball team in the summer of 2010. Fontana and Gators teammate Brian Johnson were the only two freshmen on the team.

In 2011, Fontana was a semifinalist for the Brooks Wallace Award as the nation's top shortstop. He had a .289 batting average for the Gators, who were the runners-up in the 2011 College World Series (CWS). He was named to the SEC Tournament's All-Tournament team, and to the SEC All-Defensive team for his second consecutive year. Fontana was named a preseason All-American before the 2012 season. In his junior year at Florida, he compiled a .284 batting average, a .406 on-base percentage, nine home runs, ten doubles, and 30 runs batted in, as the Gators reached the 2012 CWS.

== Professional career ==
=== Houston Astros ===
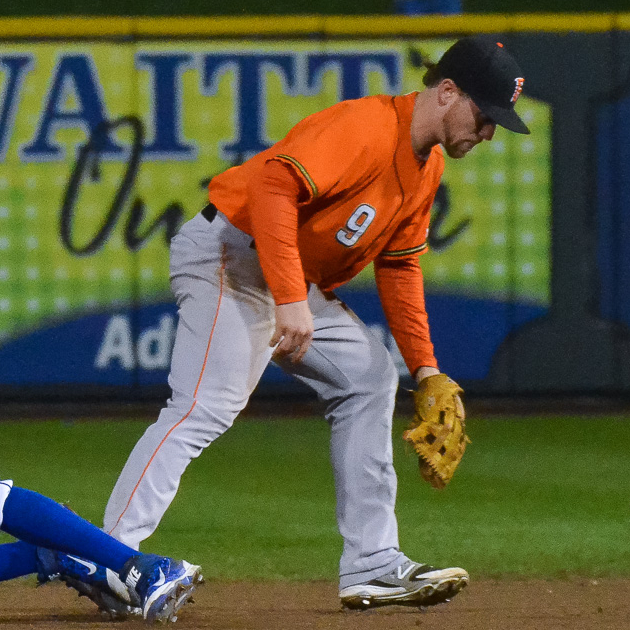
Fontana playing for the Fresno Grizzlies in 2015

The Houston Astros selected Fontana in the second round, with the 61st overall selection, of the 2012 MLB draft. He received a $875,000 signing bonus from the Astros, and reported to the Lexington Legends of the Single-A South Atlantic League. Fontana reached base six times in his professional debut. Though he only batted .225, he drew 65 walks in 49 games played, leading to a .464 on-base percentage.

In 2013, the Astros invited Fontana to spring training. He spent the 2013 season with the Lancaster JetHawks of the High-A California League, where he had more walks (102) than strikeouts (100) in 104 games played. After the season, Fontana played in the Arizona Fall League. He opened the 2014 season with the Corpus Christi Hooks of the Double-A Texas League.

The Astros again invited Fontana to spring training in 2015. He played for the Fresno Grizzlies of the Triple-A Pacific Coast League (PCL) in 2015. After the 2015 season, the Astros added Fontana to their 40-man roster, protecting him from being eligible in the Rule 5 draft. In 2016, Fontana was hitting .195 through 73 games for Fresno. On July 14, he was demoted to Corpus Christi.

=== Los Angeles Angels ===
On November 22, 2016, Fontana was claimed off waivers by the Los Angeles Angels of Anaheim. He began the 2017 season with the Triple-A Salt Lake Bees of the PCL, and was promoted to the major leagues on May 22. Fontana recorded his first major league hit, a home run, on May 26. Fontana made 12 appearances for Los Angeles during his rookie campaign, going 1-for-20 (.050) with one home run and one RBI.

Fontana made eight appearances for the Angels during the 2018 season, going 1-for-11 (.091) with one home run and one RBI. On September 4, 2018, Fontana was released by the Angels following the promotion of Joe Hudson.

=== Texas Rangers ===
On December 19, 2018, Fontana signed a minor league contract with the Texas Rangers. He was assigned to the Triple-A Nashville Sounds to open the 2019 season, where he batted .167/.311/.287 with three home runs and 10 RBI. Fontana was released by the Rangers organization on June 25, 2019.

== Personal life ==
Fontana is the grandson of Lew Burdette, who was a Major League Baseball pitcher and All-Star. Burdette lived with the Fontana family for the final years of his life.

Fontana's parents, who are fans of the Texas Rangers, named their son after Nolan Ryan. He is the youngest of three brothers.

Nolan married in 2020 to wife Kacey Fontana.
