= 2011 Mississippi State Bulldogs baseball team =

American college baseball season

2011 Mississippi State Bulldogs baseball
- Conference: Southeastern Conference
- West
- Record: 38–25 (14–16 SEC)
- Head coach: John Cohen (3rd season)
- Hitting coach: Lane Burroughs (3rd season)
- Pitching coach: Butch Thompson (3rd season)
- Home stadium: Dudy Noble Field

2011 Southeastern Conference baseball standings
	Conf.				Overall
Team	W		L	PCT	W		L	PCT
Eastern
No. 1 South Carolina ^{x}‍†‍‍^{y}	22	–	8	.733	55	–	14	.797
No. 2 Florida ^{x}‍†‍‡‍^{y}	22	–	8	.733	53	–	19	.736
No. 4 Vanderbilt ^{x}‍†‍‍^{y}	22	–	8	.733	54	–	12	.818
Georgia ‍‍‍^{y}	16	–	14	.533	33	–	32	.508
Kentucky ‍‍‍	8	–	22	.267	25	–	30	.455
Tennessee ‍‍‍	7	–	23	.233	25	–	29	.463
Western
No. 24 Arkansas ^{x}‍‍‍^{y}	15	–	15	.500	40	–	22	.645
No. 17 Mississippi State ‍‍‍^{y}	14	–	16	.467	38	–	25	.603
Alabama ‍‍‍^{y}	14	–	16	.467	35	–	28	.556
Auburn ‍‍‍	14	–	16	.467	29	–	29	.500
LSU ‍‍‍	13	–	17	.433	36	–	20	.643
Ole Miss ‍‍‍	13	–	17	.433	30	–	25	.545
x – Division champion † – Conference champion ‡ – Tournament champion y – Invited to the NCAA tournament As of June 28, 2011; Rankings from Baseball America

The 2011 Mississippi State Bulldogs baseball team represented Mississippi State University in the NCAA Division I baseball season of 2011. The team was coached by John Cohen, in his 12th year as a collegiate head coach, and his 3rd at Mississippi State.

Mississippi State returned to the NCAA tournament for the first time since 2007 and after three consecutive losing seasons. They were the number 3 seed in the Atlanta Regional hosted by number 1 seed Georgia Tech. They won the Regional, winning three games straight, beating Southern Miss, 3–0, Austin Peay, 8–3, and Georgia Tech, 7–3. They advanced to the Super Regional against host Florida, where they won one game but were eliminated by losing the other two games.

They started the season unranked in the four major polls, and finished in the final polls with their highest rankings of the season.

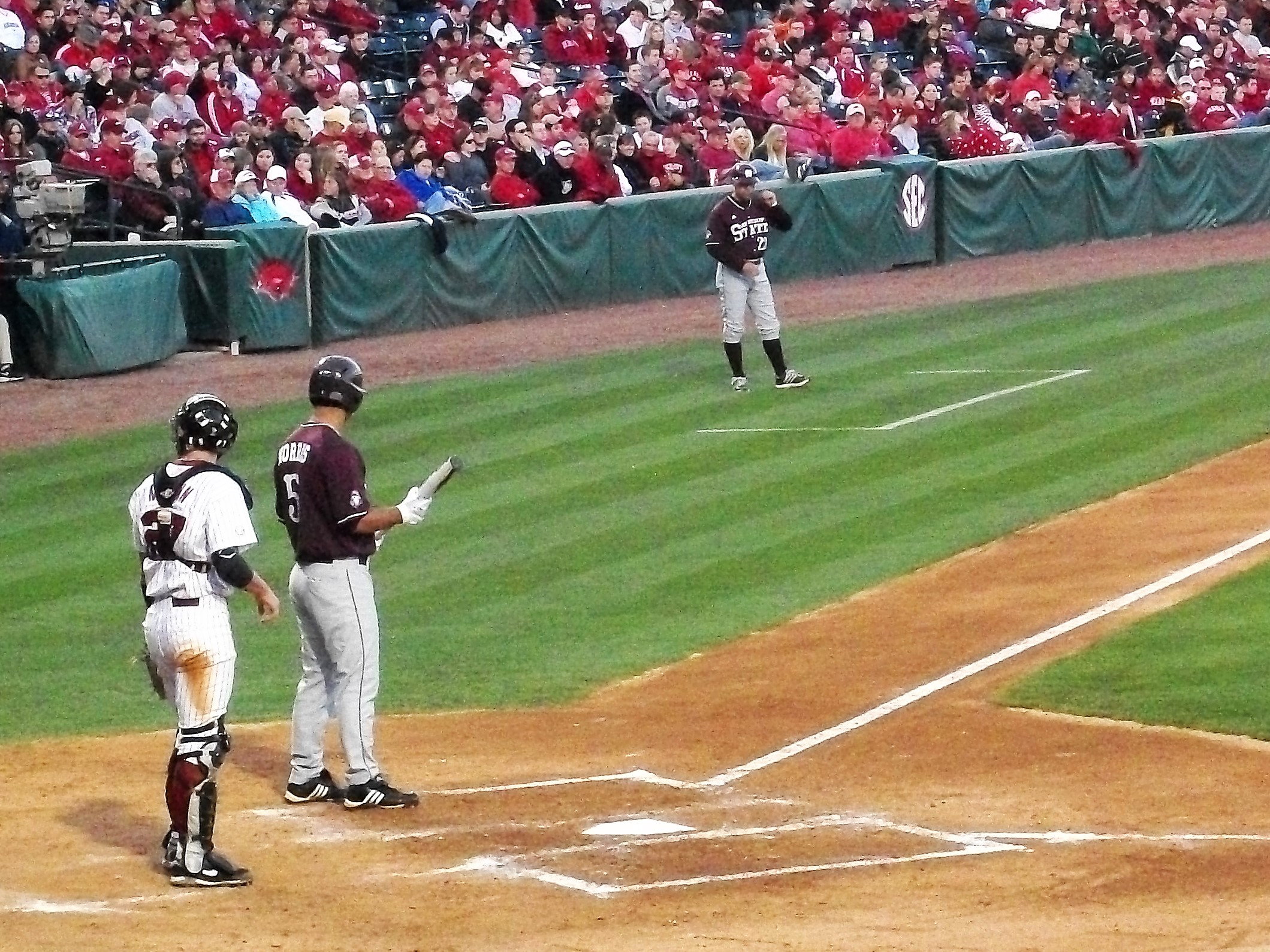
Daryl Norris prepares to bat

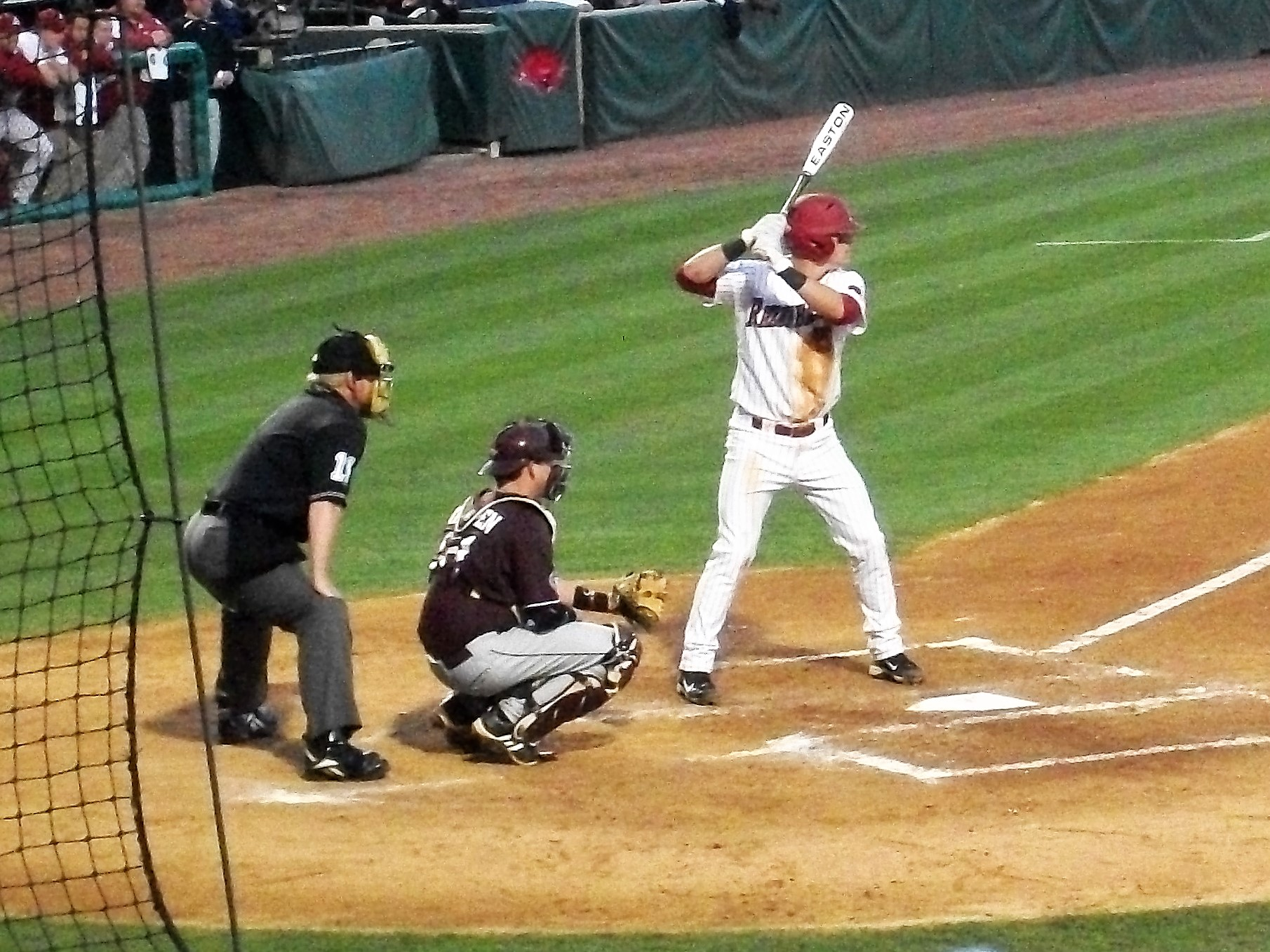
Catcher Wes Thigpen

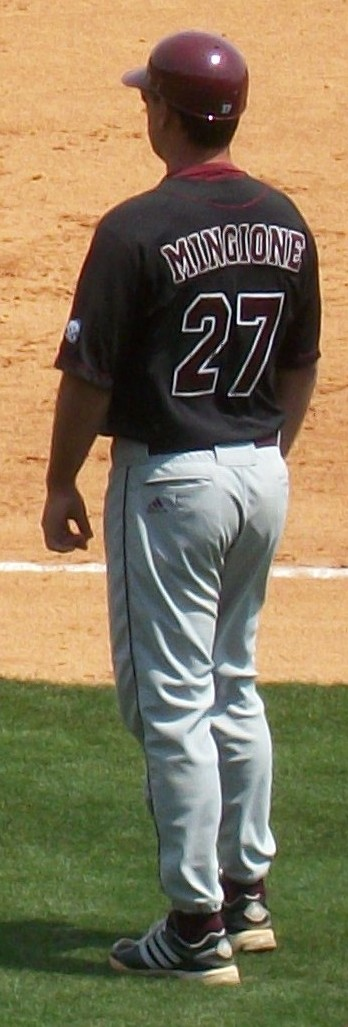
Ryan Collins tries to take second base

== MLB draft ==
Player	Position	Round	Overall	MLB team
Devin Jones	RHP	9	275	Baltimore Orioles
Nick Vickerson	OF	20	624	Texas Rangers
Jarrod Parks	2B	24	735	Anaheim Angels
Jaron Shepherd	OF	33	1008	Colorado Rockies

== Ranking movements ==
Ranking movements Legend: ██ Increase in ranking ██ Decrease in ranking
	Week																		
Poll	Pre	1	2	3	4	5	6	7	8	9	10	11	12	13	14	15	16	17	Final
Coaches'		*															*	*	15
Baseball America																	*	*	17
Collegiate Baseball^							24										16	15	15
NCBWA†																	*	19	19

^ Collegiate Baseball ranked 40 teams in their preseason poll, but only ranked 30 teams weekly during the season.
† NCBWA ranks 30 teams in their preseason poll, but only ranks 25 teams weekly during the season.
* A new poll was not released for this week, so for comparison purposes, the previous week's ranking is inserted in this week's slot.

== Coaches ==
Name	Title	First season at MSU	Alma mater
John Cohen	Head coach	2009	Mississippi State University (1990)
Butch Thompson	Associate head coach	2009	Birmingham Southern (1992)
Lane Burroughs	Assistant coach	2009	Mississippi College (1995)

== Schedule and results ==
For schedule and results, see the reference.
