= Taylor Dugas =

American baseball player (born 1989)

Current position
- Title: Recruiting Coordinator
- Team: Southeastern Louisiana
- Conference: Southland

Biographical details
- Born: December 15, 1989 (age 36); Lafayette, Louisiana

Playing career
- 2009–2012: Alabama
- 2012: Staten Island Yankees
- 2013: Charleston RiverDogs
- 2013: Tampa Yankees
- 2014–2015: Trenton Thunder
- 2014–2015: Scranton/Wilkes-Barre RailRiders
- Position: Outfielder

Coaching career (HC unless noted)
- 2017–2020: Northwestern State (H/OF)
- 2021–2022: UT Arlington (H/RC)
- 2024–present: Southeastern Louisiana (RC)

Taylor Brooks Dugas (born December 15, 1989) is an American former professional baseball outfielder and assistant baseball coach at Southeastern Louisiana University. Prior to playing professionally, Dugas played college baseball for the Alabama Crimson Tide, where he set numerous offensive records. Dugas was promoted to the major leagues by the New York Yankees but did not appear in a major league game, making him a phantom ballplayer.

== Amateur career ==
After beginning youth baseball at the age of five, Dugas joined travel teams that visited Florida and Texas. He attended Teurlings Catholic High School in Lafayette, Louisiana. Playing for the school's baseball team, Dugas had a .640 batting average with 10 home runs in his senior year. He ended his high school career with a .519 batting average. However, he was not chosen in the 2008 Major League Baseball (MLB) Draft. Though he hoped to attend Louisiana State University (LSU) to play college baseball for the LSU Tigers baseball team, they did not offer him a scholarship, only offering him the opportunity to play as a walk-on. He received a scholarship offer from the University of Alabama, which he accepted.

Playing for the Alabama Crimson Tide baseball team, Dugas batted .352 as a freshman and was named to the Freshmen All-American team. In 2010, his sophomore season, Dugas had a .395 batting average, and led the Southeastern Conference (SEC) with a .525 on-base percentage and 59 walks. Baseball America named him a first-team All-American, while the American Baseball Coaches Association honored him as a second team All-American. He was also named to the All-SEC first team. After the season, Dugas was invited to try out for the United States national collegiate baseball team, and played collegiate summer baseball with the Harwich Mariners of the Cape Cod Baseball League. In 2011, Dugas' junior year, he was named to the All-SEC second team and the SEC's All-Defensive Team.

The Chicago Cubs selected Dugas in the eighth round, with the 249th overall selection, of the 2011 MLB draft. Though the Cubs offered Dugas a $300,000 signing bonus, Dugas opted not to sign, instead returning to the Crimson Tide for his senior year, both for the opportunity to graduate, win with the Crimson Tide, and to set career offensive records. As a senior, Dugas led the Crimson Tide with a .343 batting average. He set Crimson Tide career records with 334 hits, 235 singles, 67 doubles, and 18 triples. After his senior season, Dugas was named to the All-SEC first team and the All-Defensive team.

== Professional career ==
The New York Yankees selected Dugas in the eighth round, with the 277th overall selection, of the 2012 Major League Baseball draft. He signed with the Yankees and began his professional career with the Staten Island Yankees of the Low-A New York–Penn League. He had a .306 average with Staten Island, and was named to the New York-Penn League All-Star Game. Dugas spent the 2013 season with the Charleston RiverDogs of the Single-A South Atlantic League and the Tampa Yankees of the High-A Florida State League. Between the two levels, he batted .285 and had 64 walks.

In 2014, Dugas began the season with the Trenton Thunder of the Double-A Eastern League. The Yankees promoted Dugas to the Scranton/Wilkes-Barre RailRiders of the Triple-A International League in June. Overall, he batted .299/.399/.390 with one home run, 40 RBI, and seven stolen bases in 111 games.

Dugas split the 2015 season with Trenton and Scranton/Wilkes-Barre, before being promoted to the major leagues on July 1, after an injury to Carlos Beltrán. He was optioned back to the minor leagues on July 3 without appearing in a major league game. Dugas was designated for assignment by the Yankees on July 9. Dugas was released by the Yankees in April 2016, did not play professional baseball afterwards. Dugas' time on an MLB active roster, without ever appearing in an MLB game, makes him a phantom ballplayer.

== Coaching career ==
Northwestern State University hired Dugas as an assistant coach for the Northwestern State Demons baseball team in August 2016. In December 2020, Dugas accepted the hitting coach and recruiting coordinator job at UT-Arlington. In August 2023, Dugas was hired as an assistant coach for the Southeastern Louisiana Lions baseball team, joining Bobby Barbier's new staff.

== Personal life ==
The Dugas family are friends with Ron Guidry, a Lafayette native who played for the Yankees. Dugas grew up as a Yankees fan. His older brother, Tyler, was an All-State high school player and played college baseball at McNeese State University. He also has an older sister, Tiffany.
