= 2011 South Carolina Gamecocks baseball team =

American college baseball season

2011 South Carolina Gamecocks baseball

SEC Champions SEC Eastern Division Champions Columbia Regional champions Columbia Super Regional champions

College World Series champions vs. Florida, W 2-0
- Conference: Southeastern Conference

Ranking
- Coaches: No. 1
- CB: No. 1
- Record: 55–14 (22–8 SEC)
- Head coach: Ray Tanner (15th season)
- Assistant coaches: Chad Holbrook (3rd season); Jerry Meyers (1st/9th season); Sammy Esposito (4th season)
- Home stadium: Carolina Stadium

2011 Southeastern Conference baseball standings
	Conf.				Overall
Team	W		L	PCT	W		L	PCT
Eastern
No. 1 South Carolina ^{x}‍†‍‍^{y}	22	–	8	.733	55	–	14	.797
No. 2 Florida ^{x}‍†‍‡‍^{y}	22	–	8	.733	53	–	19	.736
No. 4 Vanderbilt ^{x}‍†‍‍^{y}	22	–	8	.733	54	–	12	.818
Georgia ‍‍‍^{y}	16	–	14	.533	33	–	32	.508
Kentucky ‍‍‍	8	–	22	.267	25	–	30	.455
Tennessee ‍‍‍	7	–	23	.233	25	–	29	.463
Western
No. 24 Arkansas ^{x}‍‍‍^{y}	15	–	15	.500	40	–	22	.645
No. 17 Mississippi State ‍‍‍^{y}	14	–	16	.467	38	–	25	.603
Alabama ‍‍‍^{y}	14	–	16	.467	35	–	28	.556
Auburn ‍‍‍	14	–	16	.467	29	–	29	.500
LSU ‍‍‍	13	–	17	.433	36	–	20	.643
Ole Miss ‍‍‍	13	–	17	.433	30	–	25	.545
x – Division champion † – Conference champion ‡ – Tournament champion y – Invited to the NCAA tournament As of June 28, 2011; Rankings from Baseball America

The 2011 South Carolina Gamecocks baseball team represented the University of South Carolina in the 2011 NCAA Division I baseball season. The Gamecocks played their home games in Carolina Stadium. The team was coached by Ray Tanner, who was in his fifteenth season at Carolina. The Gamecocks won the 2011 College World Series to become the sixth school in the history of the College World Series to win consecutive national titles (after the 1949–50 Texas Longhorns; 1970–74 Southern California Trojans; 1987–88 Stanford Cardinal; 1996–97 LSU Tigers; and 2006–07 Oregon State Beavers).

During their postseason run, the Gamecocks also became the first team to go 10–0 through the postseason. Building on the success of the prior year's team, the Gamecocks set two NCAA records with consecutive post-season wins (16) and consecutive CWS wins (11); both streaks were active going into the 2012 season.

== Personnel ==
=== Roster ===
2011 South Carolina Gamecocks roster
Pitchers: 9 Steven Neff - Junior; 10 Drake Thomason - Freshman; 11 Will Casey - Junior; 14 John Taylor - Senior; 15 Nolan Belcher - Junior; 17 Jose Mata - Senior; 22 Matt Price - Sophomore; 25 Adam Westmoreland - Sophomore; 27 Forrest Koumas - Freshman; 28 Spencer Jordan - Junior; 29 Michael Roth - Junior; 33 Alex Burrell - Junior; 35 Logan Munson - Junior; 38 Tyler Webb - Sophomore; 39 Patrick Sullivan - Sophomore; 44 Colby Holmes - Sophomore; 45 Bryan Harper - Junior	Infielders: 3 Adrian Morales - Senior; 6 Peter Mooney - Junior; 8 Scott Wingo - Senior; 13 Christian Walker - Sophomore; 20 Jake Watson - Freshman; 30 Erik Payne - Freshman; Catchers: 5 Patrick Harrington - Freshman; 18 Dante Rosenberg - Junior; 34 Greg Brodzinski - Freshman; 36 Brady Thomas - Senior	Outfielders: 19 Jackie Bradley Jr. - Junior; 26 Adam Matthews - Junior; 31 Evan Marzilli - Sophomore; 40 Jake Williams - Junior; 42 DeSean Anderson - Freshman; Utility: 4 Robert Beary - Senior

2011 South Carolina Gamecocks Baseball Roster & Bios http://gamecocksonline.cstv.com/sports/m-basebl/mtt/scar-m-basebl-mtt.html

=== Coaching staff ===
2011 South Carolina Gamecocks baseball coaching staff
- 1 Ray Tanner - Head coach - 15 years
- 2 Chad Holbrook - Assistant coach - 3 years
- 12 Jerry Meyers - Assistant coach - 1 year / 9 years
- 41 Sammy Esposito - Assistant coach - 4 years
- 55 Brian Buscher - Assistant coach - Undergraduate

2011 South Carolina Gamecocks Baseball Coaches & Bios http://gamecocksonline.cstv.com/sports/m-basebl/mtt/scar-m-basebl-mtt.html#coaches

== Schedule ==
2011 South Carolina Gamecocks baseball game log (55–14)
Regular season (44–12)
February (6–0)

#	Date	Opponent	Site/stadium	Score	Win	Loss	Save	Attendance	Overall record	SEC record
1	February 18	Santa Clara	Carolina Stadium	12–5	Roth (1–0)	Simon (0–1)	None	8,242	1–0	–
2	February 19	Santa Clara	Carolina Stadium	2–1	Webb (1-0)	Hall (0–1)	Price (1)	8,242	2–0	–
3	February 20	Santa Clara	Carolina Stadium	6–0	Mata (1–0)	Mendoza (0–1)	None	7,316	3–0	–
4	February 25	Southern Illinois	Carolina Stadium	10–6	Roth (2–0)	Maldonado (0–2)	Price (2)	6,935	4–0	–
5	February 26	Southern Illinois	Carolina Stadium	4–0	Webb (2–0)	Forsythe (1–1)	None	7,911	5–0	–
6	February 27	Southern Illinois	Carolina Stadium	9–4	Taylor (1–0)	Eaton (1–1)	None	7,141	6–0	–

March (13–5)

#	Date	Opponent	Site/stadium	Score	Win	Loss	Save	Attendance	Overall record	SEC record
7	March 1	Furman	Carolina Stadium	14–1	Neff (1–0)	Smith (0–2)	None	6,162	7–0	–
8	March 4	Clemson	Carolina Stadium	6–3	Roth (3–0)	Weismann (2–1)	Price (3)	8,242	8–0	–
–	March 5	vs. Clemson	Fluor Field	Postponed						
9	March 6	@Clemson	Doug Kingsmore Stadium	5–10	Moorefield (1–0)	Price (0–1)	None	6,320	8–1	–
10	March 8	vs. Clemson	Fluor Field	5–4	Koumas (1–0)	Frederick (0–1)	Price (4)	7,125	9–1	–
–	March 9	Davidson	Carolina Stadium	Cancelled						
11	March 11	Cal State Bakersfield	Carolina Stadium	5–1	Roth (4–0)	McCarthy (1–2)	None	6,505	10–1	–
12	March 12	Cal State Bakersfield	Carolina Stadium	5–2	Neff (2–0)	Montoya (2–1)	None	7,013	11–1	–
13	March 13	Cal State Bakersfield	Carolina Stadium	3–8	Hoenshell (3–2)	Webb (2–1)	None	7,128	11–2	–
14	March 15	@Furman	Fluor Field	2–4	Stallsmith (2–1)	Westmoreland (0–1)	Cole (3)	1,422	11–3	–
15	March 16	Wofford	Carolina Stadium	8–4	Holmes (1–0)	Eck (0–3)	None	6,235	12–3	–
16	March 18	Georgia	Carolina Stadium	2–4	Wood (2–2)	Roth (4–1)	Maloof (7)	8,069	12–4	0–1
17	March 19	Georgia	Carolina Stadium	2–1	Price (1–1)	Boling (0–1)	None	8,105	13–4	1–1
18	March 20	Georgia	Carolina Stadium	8–3	Koumas (2–0)	Herman (1–2)	Price (5)	8,012	14–4	2–1
19	March 22	College of Charleston	Carolina Stadium	24–4	Holmes (2–0)	Jeroszko (2–2)	None	6,555	15–4	–
20	March 23	Rhode Island	Carolina Stadium	17–8	Mata (2–0)	Bodjiak (2–1)	None	6,397	16–4	–
21	March 25	@Florida	McKethan Stadium	9–2	Roth (5–1)	Johnson (4–1)	None	5,586	17–4	3–1
22	March 26	@Florida	McKethan Stadium	1–2	Randall (4–0)	Price (1–2)	None	4,859	17–5	3–2
23	March 27	@Florida	McKethan Stadium	4–3	Price (2–2)	Toledo (2–2)	None	4,393	18–5	4–2
24	March 30	The Citadel	Carolina Stadium	6–4	Taylor (2–0)	Cribb (0–1)	Price (6)	6,227	19–5	–

April (15–3)

#	Date	Opponent	Site/stadium	Score	Win	Loss	Save	Attendance	Overall record	SEC record
25	April 1	Kentucky	Carolina Stadium	3–1	Roth (6–1)	Meyer (3–4)	Price (7)	7,063	20–5	5–2
26	April 2	Kentucky	Carolina Stadium	4–3^{10}	Price (3–2)	Gott (1–3)	None	8,242	21–5	6–2
27	April 3	Kentucky	Carolina Stadium	4–1	Koumas (3–0)	Rogers (2–3)	Harper (1)	7,513	22–5	7–2
28	April 5	USC Upstate	Carolina Stadium	18–2	Sullivan (1–0)	DeCecco (3–3)	None	6,202	23–5	–
29	April 7	@Tennessee	Lindsey Nelson Stadium	4–0	Roth (7–1)	Catapano (2–2)	Price (8)	3,435	24–5	8–2
30	April 8	@Tennessee	Lindsey Nelson Stadium	2–0	Holmes (3–0)	Gruver (3–4)	Price (9)	2,070	25–5	9–2
31	April 9	@Tennessee	Lindsey Nelson Stadium	2–1	Koumas (4–0)	Watson (5–2)	Price (10)	2,244	26–5	10–2
32	April 12	@The Citadel	Joe Riley Park	0–2	Cribb (1–1)	Neff (2–1)	Clarkson (1)	5,032	26–6	–
33	April 15	Vanderbilt	Carolina Stadium	3–1	Roth (8–1)	Gray (7–2)	Price (11)	8,242	27–6	11–2
34	April 16	Vanderbilt	Carolina Stadium	4–6	Garvin (7–1)	Holmes (3–1)	Moore (8)	8,242	27–7	11–3
35	April 17	Vanderbilt	Carolina Stadium	5–3	Price (4–2)	Clinard (1–1)	None	8,242	28–7	12–3
36	April 19	@College of Charleston	Patriot's Point	8–3	Harper (1–0)	Zokan (0–1)	None	1,719	29–7	–
37	April 22	@Mississippi State	Dudy Noble Field	8–2	Roth (9–1)	Stratton (4–5)	None	6,023	30–7	13–3
38	April 23	@Mississippi State	Dudy Noble Field	3–5	Pollorena (5–2)	Taylor (2–1)	Reed (7)	5,971	30–8	13–4
39	April 24	@Mississippi State	Dudy Noble Field	13–4	Taylor (3–1)	Jones (2–5)	None	5,821	31–8	14–4
40	April 26	Liberty	Carolina Stadium	9–6	Mata (3–0)	Baker (5–3)	Price (12)	6,404	32–8	–
41	April 29	Auburn	Carolina Stadium	2–1	Taylor (4–1)	Ortman (0–1)	None	8,016	33–8	15–4
42	April 30	Auburn	Carolina Stadium	10–2	Holmes (4–1)	Varnadore (4–2)	None	8,242	34–8	16–4

May (10–4)

#	Date	Opponent	Site/stadium	Score	Win	Loss	Save	Attendance	Overall record	SEC record
43	May 1	Auburn	Carolina Stadium	7–3	Koumas (5–0)	Luckie (1–2)	Price (13)	8,020	35–8	17–4
44	May 4	@Wofford	King Field	9–3	Westmoreland (1–1)	Sheridan (1–4)	None	2,118	36–8	–
45	May 6	@Ole Miss	Swayze Field	6–1	Roth (10–1)	Crouse (6–4)	None	8,121	37–8	18–4
46	May 7	@Ole Miss	Swayze Field	2–10	Goforth (4–6)	Holmes (4–2)	None	8,046	37–9	18–5
47	May 8	@Ole Miss	Swayze Field	6–7	Morgan (3–0)	Price (4–3)	None	8,332	37–10	18–6
48	May 10	Presbyterian	Carolina Stadium	6–1	Neff (3–1)	Jeter (5–6)	None	6,575	38–10	–
49	May 11	Charleston Southern	Carolina Stadium	11-1	Sullivan (2-0)	Mauldin (0-4)	None	6,516	39–10	–
50	May 13	Arkansas	Carolina Stadium	2–6	Baxendale (8–1)	Roth (10–2)	Daniel (2)	7,672	39–11	18–7
51	May 14	Arkansas	Carolina Stadium	6–5	Price (5–3)	Stanek (2–2)	None	7,765	40–11	19–7
52	May 15	Arkansas	Carolina Stadium	7–1	Holmes (5–2)	Lynch (4–3)	None	8,142	41–11	20–7
53	May 17	UNC Asheville	Carolina Stadium	9–5	Webb (3–1)	Ricker (1–2)	None	7,116	42–11	–
54	May 19	@Alabama	Sewell-Thomas Stadium	1–2	Kilcrease (6–4)	Roth (10–3)	None	3,523	42–12	20–8
55	May 20	@Alabama	Sewell-Thomas Stadium	6–3	Koumas (6–0)	Morgan (5–5)	Price (14)	3,945	43–12	21–8
56	May 21	@Alabama	Sewell-Thomas Stadium	3–2	Holmes (6–2)	Smart (4–2)	Price (15)	3,764	44–12	22–8

Post-season
SEC Tournament (1–2)

#	Date	Opponent	Site/stadium	Score	Win	Loss	Save	Attendance	Overall record	SECT record
57	May 25	Auburn	Regions Park	7–3	Roth (11–3)	Jacobs (1–5)	None	8,814	45–12	1–0
58	May 26	Vanderbilt	Regions Park	2–7	Gray (10–3)	Koumas (6–1)	Moore (10)	7,123	45–13	1–1
59	May 27	Georgia	Regions Park	2–4	Dieterich (3–3)	Holmes (6–3)	Maloof (17)	8,068	45–14	1–2

NCAA Regionals (3–0)

#	Date	Opponent	Site/stadium	Score	Win	Loss	Save	Attendance	Overall record	NCAAT record
60	June 3	Georgia Southern	Carolina Stadium	2–1	Roth (12–3)	Moye (7–2)	Price (16)	8,091	46–14	1–0
61	June 4	Stetson	Carolina Stadium	11–5	Holmes (7–3)	Dorsey (7–6)	None	7,335	47–14	2–0
62	June 5	Stetson	Carolina Stadium	8–2	Taylor (5–1)	Perez (2–3)	Price (17)	6,718	48–14	3–0

NCAA Super Regionals (2–0)

#	Date	Opponent	Site/stadium	Score	Win	Loss	Save	Attendance	Overall record	NCAAT record
63	June 10	Connecticut	Carolina Stadium	5–1	Roth (13–3)	Barnes (11–5)	None	8,242	49–14	4–0
64	June 11	Connecticut	Carolina Stadium	8–2	Taylor (6–1)	Nappo (10–3)	Price (18)	8,242	50–14	5–0

College World Series (5–0)

#	Date	Opponent	Site/stadium	Score	Win	Loss	Save	Attendance	Overall record	NCAAT record
65	June 19	Texas A&M	TD Ameritrade Park	5–4	Price (6–3)	Martin (2–3)	None	23,395	51–14	6–0
66	June 21	Virginia	TD Ameritrade Park	7–1	Taylor (7–1)	Roberts (11–2)	None	22,027	52–14	7–0
67	June 24	Virginia	TD Ameritrade Park	3–2^{13}	Price (7–3)	Winiarski (6–4)	None	25,882	53–14	8–0
68	June 27	Florida	TD Ameritrade Park	2–1^{11}	Taylor (8–1)	Maronde (0–1)	Price (19)	25,851	54–14	9–0
69	June 28	Florida	TD Ameritrade Park	5–2	Roth (14–3)	Whitson (8–1)	Price (20)	26,721	55–14	10–0

2011 South Carolina Gamecocks Baseball Schedule http://gamecocksonline.cstv.com/sports/m-basebl/sched/scar-m-basebl-sched.html

== Honors and awards ==
- Forrest Koumas was named SEC Co-Freshman of the Week on April 4.
- Colby Holmes was named SEC Pitcher of the Week on April 11 and May 16.
- Michael Roth was named SEC Pitcher of the Week on April 18.
- Christian Walker was named SEC Player of the Week on April 25.
- Matt Price, Michael Roth and Scott Wingo were named First-Team All-SEC, Christian Walker was named Second-Team All-SEC, and Forrest Koumas was named Freshman All-SEC.
- Head coach Ray Tanner was named SEC Coach of the Year.
- Michael Roth was named CoSIDA First Team Academic All-American.
- Michael Roth was named to the SEC All-Tournament Team.
- Michael Roth was named Louisville Slugger Third-Team All-American.
- Robert Beary was named MVP of the NCAA Columbia Regional. Christian Walker, Scott Wingo, Adrian Morales, Evan Marzilli, and Michael Roth were also named to the All-Tournament team.
- Robert Beary (C), Peter Mooney (SS), Matt Price (P), Michael Roth (P), Brady Thomas (DH), Christian Walker (1B) and Scott Wingo (2B) were named to the College World Series All-Tournament Team.
- Scott Wingo was named Most Outstanding Player of the 2011 College World Series.

== Rankings ==
Ranking movement
Poll	Pre- season	Feb. 21	Feb. 28	Mar. 7	Mar. 14	Mar. 21	Mar. 28	Apr. 4	Apr. 11	Apr. 18	Apr. 25	May 2	May 9	May 16	May 23	May 30	June 6	June 13	Final Poll
USA Today/ESPN Coaches' (Top 25)	8	8	4	4	6	4	4	3	3	2	3	3	3	2	1	4	-	-	1
Baseball America (Top 25)	7	7	4	4	4	4	3	3	3	2	2	2	4	3	1	4	-	-	1
Collegiate Baseball (Top 30)	14	12	6	6	7	7	3	3	3	2	2	1	4	3	1	4	4	4	1
NCBWA (Top 30)	8	6	4	4	6	6	3	3	3	2	3	2	3	2	1	4	4	4	1

- NR = Not ranked

== Gamecocks in the 2011 MLB draft ==
The following members of the South Carolina Gamecocks baseball program were drafted in the 2011 Major League Baseball draft.

Player	Position	Round	Overall	MLB team
Jackie Bradley Jr.	OF	Comp A	40th	Boston Red Sox
Matt Price	RHP	6th	184th	Arizona Diamondbacks
Scott Wingo	2B	11th	344th	Los Angeles Dodgers
Peter Mooney	SS	21st	649th	Toronto Blue Jays
John Taylor	RHP	22nd	663rd	Seattle Mariners
Adam Matthews	OF	23rd	695th	Baltimore Orioles
Bryan Harper	LHP	30th	907th	Washington Nationals
Michael Roth	LHP	31st	938th	Cleveland Indians
Steven Neff	LHP	41st	1257th	San Francisco Giants
Tyler Webb	LHP	48th	1465th	Cincinnati Reds
Adrian Morales	3B	49th	1476th	Kansas City Royals
