= 2011 LSU Tigers baseball team =

American college baseball season

2011 LSU Tigers baseball
- Conference: Southeastern Conference
- West
- Record: 36–20 (13–17 SEC)
- Head coach: Paul Mainieri
- Hitting coach: Javi Sanchez
- Pitching coach: David Grewe
- Home stadium: Alex Box Stadium

2011 Southeastern Conference baseball standings
	Conf.				Overall
Team	W		L	PCT	W		L	PCT
Eastern
No. 1 South Carolina ^{x}‍†‍‍^{y}	22	–	8	.733	55	–	14	.797
No. 2 Florida ^{x}‍†‍‡‍^{y}	22	–	8	.733	53	–	19	.736
No. 4 Vanderbilt ^{x}‍†‍‍^{y}	22	–	8	.733	54	–	12	.818
Georgia ‍‍‍^{y}	16	–	14	.533	33	–	32	.508
Kentucky ‍‍‍	8	–	22	.267	25	–	30	.455
Tennessee ‍‍‍	7	–	23	.233	25	–	29	.463
Western
No. 24 Arkansas ^{x}‍‍‍^{y}	15	–	15	.500	40	–	22	.645
No. 17 Mississippi State ‍‍‍^{y}	14	–	16	.467	38	–	25	.603
Alabama ‍‍‍^{y}	14	–	16	.467	35	–	28	.556
Auburn ‍‍‍	14	–	16	.467	29	–	29	.500
LSU ‍‍‍	13	–	17	.433	36	–	20	.643
Ole Miss ‍‍‍	13	–	17	.433	30	–	25	.545
x – Division champion † – Conference champion ‡ – Tournament champion y – Invited to the NCAA tournament As of June 28, 2011; Rankings from Baseball America

The 2011 LSU Tigers baseball team represented Louisiana State University in the NCAA Division I baseball season of 2011. The Tigers played their home games in the new Alex Box Stadium, which opened in 2009.

The team was coached by Paul Mainieri who was in his fifth season at LSU. In the previous season, the Tigers failed to defend their 2009 National Title. Overall, the Tigers finished 41–22, 14–16 in the SEC.

== Pre-season ==
=== Key Losses ===
- Anthony Ranaudo, P Drafted in Comp. A, 39th overall, of the 2010 MLB Draft by the Boston Red Sox
- Micah Gibbs, C Drafted in Round 3, 97th overall, of the 2010 MLB Draft by the Chicago Cubs
- Leon Landry, OF Drafted in Round 3, 109th overall, of the 2010 MLB Draft by the Los Angeles Dodgers
- Blake Dean, 1B Drafted in Round 8, 262nd overall, of the 2010 MLB Draft by the Los Angeles Dodgers

== Personnel ==
=== 2011 roster ===
2011 LSU Tigers baseball roster
Pitchers: 9 Samuel Peterson – Freshman; 12 Kevin Gausman – Freshman; 17 Jimmy Dykstra – Sophomore; 18 Michael Reed – Sophomore; 21 Joe Broussard – Freshman; 22 Matty Ott – Junior; 24 Daniel Bradshaw – Senior; 25 Joey Bourgeois – Junior; 28 Forrest Garrett – (redshirt) Freshman; 29 Jordan Rittiner – Sophomore; 30 Tyler Jones – Junior; 32 Coklin Nguyen – Freshman; 33 Kevin Berry – Sophomore; 34 Randal Meyer – Freshman; 37 Ryan Eades – Freshman; 38 Nick Rumbelow – Freshman; 39 Kurt McCune – Freshamn; 40 Mitch Hopkins – Junior; 41 Kirk Cunningham – Junior; 47 Ben Alsup – Senior; 58 Chris Cotton – Sophomore	Catchers: 6 Jordy Snikeris – Junior; 26 Ty Ross – Freshman; 35 Jackson Slaid – Freshman	Infielders: 4 Raph Rhymes – Sophomore; 11 Tyler Hanover – Junior; 13 Alex Edward – Sophomore; 14 Mike Lowery – (redshirt) Junior; 23 JaCoby Jones – Freshman; 16 Matt Fury – (redshirt) Freshman; 27 Beau Didier – (redshirt) Sophomore; 36 Austin Nola – Junior; 46 Jamie Bruno – Junior; Utility: 7 Grant Dozar – Junior	Outfielders: 2 Spencer Ware – Freshman; 3 Trey Watkins – Junior; 5 Mason Katz – Sophomore; 8 Mikie Mahtook – Junior

2011 LSU Tigers Baseball Roster & Bios http://www.lsusports.net/SportSelect.dbml?SPSID=27867&SPID=2173&Q_SEASON=2010

=== Coaching staff ===
2011 LSU Tigers baseball coaching staff
- Paul Mainieri – Head coach – 4 years at LSU
- David Grewe – Associate head coach, Pitching Coach, Recruiting coordinator – 2 year
- Javi Sanchez – Assistant coach, Hitting Coach – 3 years
- Will Davis – Volunteer assistant coach, Outfielders Coach – 3 years
- Ross Brezovsky – Coordinator of Baseball Operations – 2 years

2011 LSU Tigers Baseball Coaches & Bios http://www.lsusports.net/SportSelect.dbml?&DB_OEM_ID=5200&SPID=2173&SPSID=28707

== Schedule/Results ==
2011 LSU Tigers baseball Game Log

Regular Season

February
#	Date	Opponent	Site/stadium	Score	Win	Loss	Save	Attendance	Overall record	SEC record
1	February 18	Wake Forest	Alex Box Stadium	15–4	Alsup (1–0)	Stadler (0–1)	None	12,070	1–0	–
2	February 19	Wake Forest	Alex Box Stadium	4–3	Eades (1–0)	Cooney (0–1)	Ott (1)	11,113	2–0	–
3	February 20	Wake Forest	Alex Box Stadium	9–1	McCune (1–0)	Von Grouw (0–1)	None	10,753	3–0	–
4	February 22	New Orleans	Alex Box Stadium	13–0	Jones (1–0)	Manning (0–1)	None	10,486	4–0	–
5	February 25	Holy Cross	Alex Box Stadium	12–3	Gausman (1–0)	Pedrotty (0–1)	None	11,082	5–0	–
6	February 26	Holy Cross	Alex Box Stadium	14–3	McCune (2–0)	Croglio (0–1)	None	10,970	6–0	–
7	February 27	Holy Cross	Alex Box Stadium	15–4	Alsup (2–0)	Koneski (0–1)	None	10,404	7–0	–

March
#	Date	Opponent	Site/stadium	Score	Win	Loss	Save	Attendance	Overall record	SEC record
8	March 1	Southeastern LA	Alex Box Stadium	7–3	Jones (2–0)	Hymel (1–1)	None	11,307	8–0	–
9	March 2	Mississippi Valley St.	Alex Box Stadium	10–8	Dykstra (1–0)	Dowell (0–3)	Ott (2)	9,658	9–0	–
10	March 4	Princeton	Alex Box Stadium	8–2	McCune (3–0)	Bowman (0–1)	None	9,831	10–0	–
11	March 5	Princeton	Alex Box Stadium	7–2	Gausman (2–0)	Ford (0–1)	Berry (1)	9,980	11–0	–
12	March 6	Princeton	Alex Box Stadium	7–8	Fagan (1–0)	Alsup (2–1)	Palms (1)	10,124	11–1	–
13	March 9	Sacred Heart	Alex Box Stadium	6–2	Jones (3–0)	Leiningen (0–1)	None	9,765	12–1	–
14	March 11	#6 Cal St. Fullerton	Alex Box Stadium	7–6	Dykstra (2–0)	Ramirez (2–2)	Ott (3)	11,738	13–1	–
15	March 12	#6 Cal St. Fullerton	Alex Box Stadium	7–6	Berry (1–0)	Floro (1–2)	Ott (4)	11,803	14–1	–
16	March 13	#6 Cal St. Fullerton	Alex Box Stadium	10–2	Alsup (3–1)	O'Connell (2–1)	None	10,850	15–1	–
17	March 16	Nicholls St.	Ray E. Didier Field	12–8	Dykstra (3–0)	Delatte (0–1)	None	2,528	16–1	–
18	March 18	#1 Florida	Alex Box Stadium	4–5	Toledo (2–1)	Ott (0–1)	DeSclafani (3)	12,076	16–2	0–1
19	March 19	#1 Florida	Alex Box Stadium	0–1	Randall (3–0)	Gausman (2–1)	Maronde (1)	11,703	16–3	0–2
20	March 20	#1 Florida	Alex Box Stadium	3–7	Maddox (1–0)	Alsup (3–2)	None	10,783	16–4	0–3
21	March 22	UL-Lafayette	Alex Box Stadium	5–11	Satriano (1–1)	Broussard (0–1)	None	11,004	16–5	0–3
22	March 25	Georgia	Foley Field	7–3	McCune (4–0)	Wood (2–3)	None	2,847	17–5	1–3
23	March 27	Georgia	Foley Field	5–9^{7}	Palazzone (3–1)	Gausman (2–2)	None	–	17–6	1–4
24	March 27	Georgia	Foley Field	2–3^{7}	Gullickson (2–1)	Alsup (3–3)	Maloof (8)	2,083	17–7	1–5
25	March 30	McNeese St.	Alex Box Stadium	6–0	Peterson (1–0)	Parcell (2–2)	None	9,818	18–7	1–5

April
#	Date	Opponent	Site/stadium	Score	Win	Loss	Save	Attendance	Overall record	SEC record
26	April 1	Ole Miss	Alex Box Stadium	7–6	McCune (5–0)	Crouse (6–1)	Berry (2)	10,637	19–7	2–5
27	April 2	Ole Miss	Alex Box Stadium	3–16	Goforth (1–4)	Gausman (2–3)	None	11,421	19–8	2–6
28	April 3	Ole Miss	Alex Box Stadium	8–2	Alsup (4–3)	Wright (3–3)	None	10,484	20–8	3–6
29	April 5	Tulane	Turchin Stadium	7–5	Berry (2–0)	Facundus (5–1)	None	5,131	21–8	3–6
30	April 8	Arkansas	Baum Stadium	0–2	Astin (3–1)	McCune (5–1)	Sanburn (5)	9,854	21–9	3–7
31	April 9	Arkansas	Baum Stadium	3–4	Sanburn (2–1)	Berry (2–1)	None	11,462	21–10	3–8
32	April 10	Arkansas	Baum Stadium	4–5	Lynch (3–1)	Ott (0–2)	None	8,116	21–11	3–9
33	April 12	Northwestern St.	Alex Stadium	2–5	Roark (1–2)	Eades (1–1)	Melotakis (1)	9,687	21–12	3–9
34	April 13	Alcorn St.	Alex Box Stadium	7–1	Rumbelow (1–0)	Blaum (1–4)	None	9,478	22–12	3–9
35	April 15	Auburn	Alex Box Stadium	7–8	Blatt (2–2)	McCune (5–2)	Wallen (5)	10,004	22–13	3–10
36	April 16	Auburn	Alex Box Stadium	1–3	Wallen (3–3)	Gausman (2–4)	None	10,628	22–14	3–11
37	April 17	Auburn	Alex Box Stadium	3–2	Alsup (5–3)	Jacobs (1–3)	Ott (5)	10,047	23–14	4–11
38	April 20	#19 Southern Miss	Zephyr Field	8–6	Ott (1–2)	Cargill (4–3)	None	9,700	24–14	4–11
39	April 22	#4 Vanderbilt	Hawkins Field	3–11	Gray (8–2)	McCune (5–3)	None	3,541	24–15	4–12
40	April 23	#4 Vanderbilt	Hawkins Field	1–10	Garvin (8–1)	Gausman (2–5)	None	3,541	24–16	4–13
41	April 24	#4 Vanderbilt	Hawkins Field	7–10	Hill (3–0)	Alsup (5–4)	Moore (9)	2,706	24–17	4–14
42	April 26	Nicholls	Alex Box Stadium	12–3	Eades (2–1)	Dalton (2–3)	None	10,126	25–17	4–14
43	April 28	Kentucky	Alex Box Stadium	9–5	Rumbelow (2–0)	Kapteyn (0–3)	None	9,810	26–17	5–14
44	April 29	Kentucky	Alex Box Stadium	12–4	Gausman (3–5)	Littrell (5–4)	None	10,213	27–17	6–14
45	April 30	Kentucky	Alex Box Stadium	8–4	Alsup (6–4)	Rogers (2–6)	None	9,993	28–17	7–14

May
#	Date	Opponent	Site/stadium	Score	Win	Loss	Save	Attendance	Overall record	SEC record
46	May 3	Tulane	Alex Box Stadium	6–2	Eades (3–1)	Konvicka (2–1)	Ott (6)	9,732	29–17	7–14
47	May 6	Alabama	Sewell-Thomas Stadium	10–6	McCune (6–3)	Kilcrease (5–4)	None	4,175	30–17	8–14
48	May 7	Alabama	Sewell-Thomas Stadium	0–4	Morgan (5–4)	Gausman (3–6)	Smart (9)	4,185	30–18	8–15
49	May 8	Alabama	Sewell-Thomas Stadium	0–9	Smart (4–1)	Alsup (6–5)	None	4,019	30–19	8–16
50	May 13	Tennessee	Alex Box Stadium	9–0	Gausman (4–6)	Gruver (4–7)	None	10,111	31–19	9–16
51	May 14	Tennessee	Alex Box Stadium	8–1	McCune (7–3)	Blount (1–4)	None	10,354	32–19	10–16
52	May 15	Tennessee	Alex Box Stadium	15–5	Berry (3–1)	Godley (1–1)	None	10,552	33–19	11–16
53	May 17	New Orleans	Maestri Field	5–0	Jones (4–0)	Sanders (1–11)	None	930	34–19	11–16
54	May 19	Mississippi State	Dudy Noble Field	17–1	Gausman (5–6)	Pollorena (6–4)	None	6,161	35–19	12–16
55	May 20	Mississippi State	Dudy Noble Field	5–6	Stark (3–0)	Ott (1–3)	None	6,425	35–20	12–17
56	May 21	Mississippi State	Dudy Noble Field	6–3	Eades (4–1)	Stratton (5–7)	Alsup (1)	6,557	36–20	13–17

Post-Season

SEC Tournament
#	Date	Opponent	Site/stadium	Score	Win	Loss	Save	Attendance	Overall record	SECT record

NCAA Tournament: Regionals
#	Date	Opponent	Site/stadium	Score	Win	Loss	Save	Attendance	Overall record	NCAAT record

*Rankings are based on the team's current ranking in the Baseball America poll the week LSU faced each opponent.

== LSU Tigers in the 2011 Major League Baseball draft ==
The following members and future members (denoted by *) of the LSU Tigers baseball program were drafted in the 2011 MLB draft.

Player	Position	Round	Overall	MLB Team
Mikie Mahtook	OF	1	30	Tampa Bay Rays
*Trevor Story	SS	1A	45	Colorado Rockies
*John Eierman	SS	4	119	Tampa Bay Rays
*Jake Cave	OF	6	209	New York Yankees
Tyler Jones	RHP	11	358	Minnesota Twins
Matty Ott	RHP	13	412	Boston Red Sox
*Cody Glenn	LHP	15	469	Toronto Blue Jays
Ben Alsup	RHP	18	548	Colorado Rockies
*Aaron Nola	RHP	22	679	Toronto Blue Jays
*Nick Goody	RHP	22	698	New York Yankees
*Arby Fields	LF	27	833	San Diego Padres
Austin Nola	SS	31	949	Toronto Blue Jays
Raph Rhymes	2B	40	1202	Pittsburgh Pirates
Tyler Hanover	SS	40	1229	New York Yankees
*Carson Baranik	RHP	41	1255	Cincinnati Reds
