= Josh Osich =

American baseball player (born 1988)

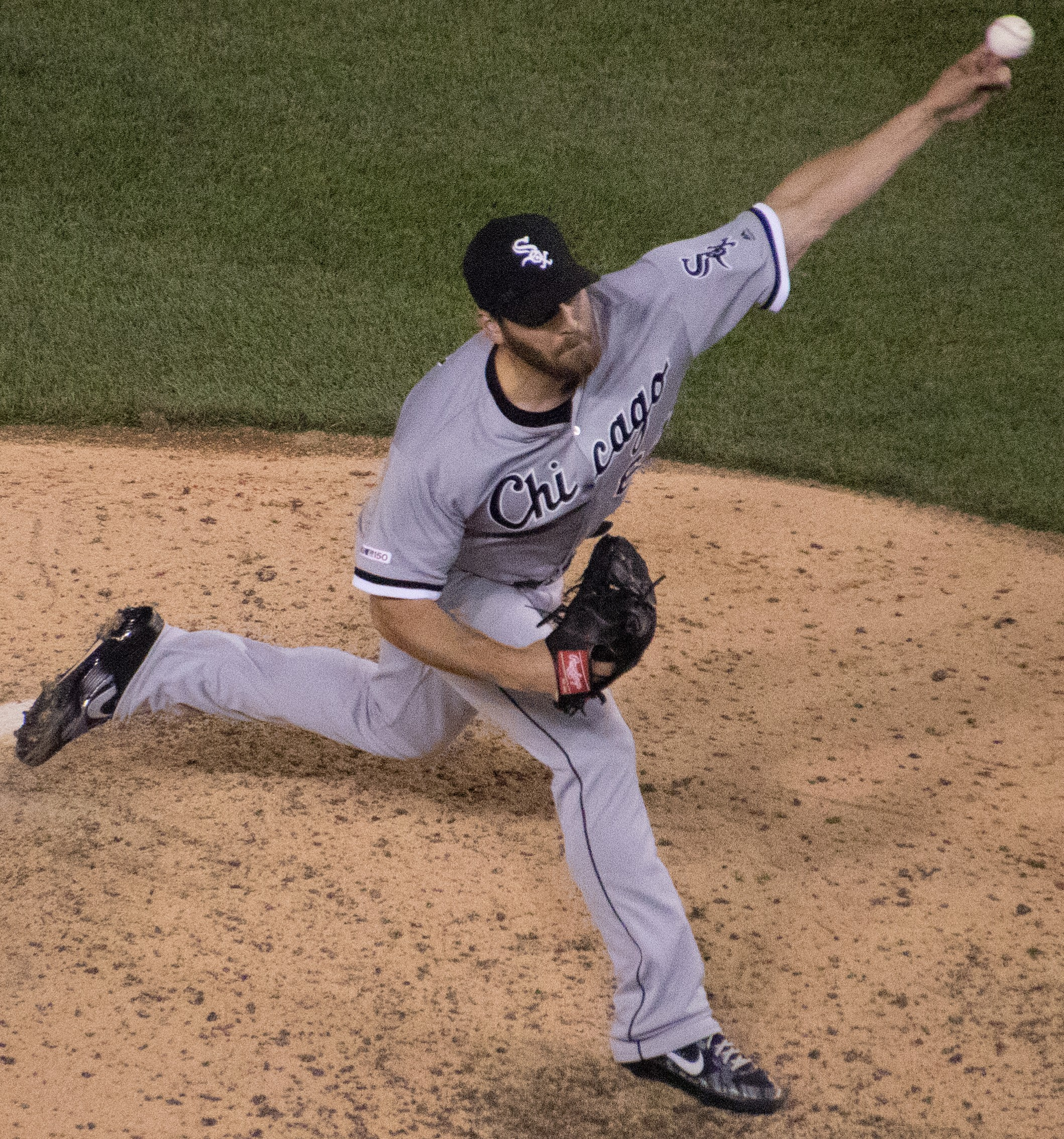
- Osich with the Chicago White Sox in 2019
- Pitcher
- Born: September 3, 1988 (age 38); Boise, Idaho, U.S.
- Batted: Left Threw: Left

MLB debut
- July 3, 2015, for the San Francisco Giants

Last MLB appearance
- July 26, 2021, for the Cincinnati Reds

MLB statistics
- Win–loss record: 13–6
- Earned run average: 5.02
- Strikeouts: 199
- Stats at Baseball Reference

Teams
- San Francisco Giants (2015–2018); Chicago White Sox (2019); Boston Red Sox (2020); Chicago Cubs (2020); Cincinnati Reds (2021)

Joshua Michael Osich (born September 3, 1988) is an American former professional baseball pitcher. He made his Major League Baseball (MLB) debut with the San Francisco Giants in 2015 and also played for the Chicago White Sox, Boston Red Sox, and Chicago Cubs. He is one of the only players in MLB history who is of Basque descent.

== Early life ==
Joshua Michael Osich was born on September 3, 1988, in Boise, Idaho. Osich attended Bishop Kelly High School and graduated in 2007.

== College career ==
Osich played college baseball at Oregon State University in Corvallis, but missed the 2010 season, recovering from Tommy John surgery. Despite the injury, he was selected by the Los Angeles Angels of Anaheim in the seventh round of the 2010 Major League Baseball draft. Osich did not sign and returned to Oregon State and in his final collegiate season in 2011, he threw a no-hitter against UCLA.

== Professional career ==
=== Draft and minor leagues ===
Osich was then taken by the San Francisco Giants in the sixth round (207th overall) of the 2011 Major League Baseball draft and signed. He made his professional debut in 2012 with the High-A San Jose Giants, registering a 3.62 ERA with 34 strikeouts across 27 appearances. Osich split the 2013 season between San Jose and the Double-A Richmond Flying Squirrels. In 56 appearances out of the bullpen, he accumulated a 5-4 record and 3.47 ERA with 76 strikeouts over 70 innings of work. Osich returned to Richmond for the 2014 campaign, recording a 3.78 ERA with 27 strikeouts across 33 1/3 innings pitched.

Osich began the 2015 season with Richmond, and received a promotion to the Triple-A Sacramento River Cats in June. In 37 appearances split between the two affiliates, he registered a cumulative 1.32 ERA with 45 strikeouts and 21 saves across 41 innings of work.

=== San Francisco Giants (2015–2018) ===
Osich was called up to the majors for the first time on July 3, 2015, pitching one scoreless inning of relief against the Washington Nationals. On July 11, Osich earned his first major league win in his fifth relief appearance, pitching 1/3 of an inning against the Philadelphia Phillies. Osich didn't allow a hit until his eighth major league appearance. Osich was optioned to Triple-A Sacramento on July 22. Osich was recalled to the Giants on August 7, when pitcher Mike Leake was put on the disabled list. In 2015, Osich appeared in 35 games, recording a 2.20 ERA with 27 strikeouts in 28 2/3 innings pitched.

In 2016, Osich was named to the Opening Day Major League roster for the Giants. On July 28, Osich was placed on disabled list. He finished the season appearing in 59 games, posting an ERA of 4.71 in 36 1/3 innings. Osich posted an ERA of 6.23 in 54 games in 2017, with 43 strikeouts in 43 1/3 innings. Osich began the 2018 season in the bullpen before being placed on the disabled list on April 20. He was sent to the minors on May 25. Osich ended the season having appeared in 12 games, with an 8.25 ERA. Osich was designated for assignment on February 12, 2019, following the acquisition of Jose Lopez.

=== Chicago White Sox (2019) ===
On February 19, 2019, Osich was claimed off waivers by the Baltimore Orioles. He was designated for assignment on March 8, following the acquisition of Dwight Smith Jr.

On March 11, 2019, Osich was claimed off waivers by the Chicago White Sox. Osich appeared in 57 games (all in relief) with the 2019 White Sox, recording a 4–0 record with a 4.66 ERA while striking out 61 batters in 67 2/3 innings pitched.

=== Boston Red Sox (2020) ===
On October 31, 2019, Osich was claimed off waivers by the Boston Red Sox. He was non-tendered on December 2, 2019, and became a free agent. On December 4, Osich re-signed with Boston on a one-year major league contract. He made his debut for the Red Sox in the team's second game of the delayed-start 2020 season, pitching a scoreless inning in relief on July 25. With the 2020 Red Sox, Osich compiled a 1–1 record in 13 appearances totaling 15 2/3 innings pitched with a 5.74 ERA.

=== Chicago Cubs (2020) ===
On August 31, 2020, Osich was traded to the Chicago Cubs in exchange for Zach Bryant. With the 2020 Chicago Cubs, Osich appeared in 4 games, struggling to a 10.13 ERA and 4 strikeouts in 2 2/3 innings pitched. On September 30, Osich was designated for assignment by the Cubs shortly before their Wild Card matchup against the Miami Marlins.

=== Cincinnati Reds (2021) ===
On December 21, 2020, Osich signed a minor league contract with the Cincinnati Reds organization. On June 19, 2021, Osich was selected to the active roster. In 17 appearances for the Reds, Osich posted a 5.02 ERA with 9 strikeouts. On July 11, Osich recorded his only MLB save by pitching the final inning of a 3-1 Reds victory over the Brewers. On July 28, Osich was designated for assignment by the Reds. He elected free agency on July 30.

On May 16, 2022, Osich announced his retirement from professional baseball via Instagram.
