= 2011 California Golden Bears baseball team =

American college baseball season

2011 California Golden Bears baseball

Houston Regional champions Santa Clara Super Regional champions

College World Series, 1–2
- Conference: Pacific-10 Conference

Ranking
- Coaches: No. 8
- CB: No. 6
- Record: 38–23 (13–13 Pac-10)
- Head coach: David Esquer (12th season)
- Assistant coaches: Tony Arnerich (2nd season); Dan Hubbs (12th season); Brad Sanfilippo (2nd season)
- Home stadium: Evans Diamond

2011 Pacific-10 Conference baseball standings
	Conf.				Overall
Team	W		L	PCT	W		L	PCT
No. 18 UCLA ‍†‍‍^{y}	18	–	9	.667	35	–	24	.593
No. 11 Arizona State ‍‍‍^{y}	17	–	10	.630	42	–	16	.724
No. 16 Oregon State ‍‍‍^{y}	17	–	10	.630	41	–	17	.707
Arizona ‍‍‍^{y}	15	–	12	.556	39	–	21	.650
No. 21 Stanford ‍‍‍^{y}	14	–	12	.538	35	–	20	.636
California ‍‍‍^{y}	13	–	13	.500	35	–	21	.625
USC ‍‍‍	13	–	14	.481	25	–	31	.446
Oregon ‍‍‍	11	–	16	.407	33	–	26	.559
Washington State ‍‍‍	10	–	17	.370	26	–	28	.481
Washington ‍‍‍	6	–	21	.222	17	–	37	.315
† – Conference champion ‡ – Pac-10 Conference champion y – Invited to the 2011 NCAA Division I baseball tournament As of June 8, 2011; Rankings from Coaches' Poll

The 2011 California Golden Bears baseball team represented the University of California, Berkeley in the 2011 NCAA Division I baseball season. The team played their home games in Evans Diamond. They entered the 2011 season after making the postseason two of the last three years and with a 31–20 record, the Golden Bears won an at-large berth (therefore making the postseason three of the past four years) for the 2011 NCAA Division I baseball tournament, and were seeded #3 in the Houston. The Golden Bears lost the first game of the double-elimination format to the Baylor Bears, 6–4. California then went on to win their next four games in a row eliminating Alcorn State, #1 seed Rice, and Baylor. With their victory on June 6, the Bears advanced to a Super Regional for the first time since the 64 team format was introduced. California hosted its Super Regional games on June 11 and 12 sweeping Dallas Baptist to advance to the College World Series for the first time since 1992. Although the Bears hosted, the series was not at Evans Diamond in Berkeley, but at Stephen Schott Stadium in Santa Clara because Cal's stadium was not suitable for large television crews and did not have lights.

== Previous season ==
California finished the 2010 regular season as the #6 team in the Pacific-10 Conference, and was eliminated in two games in the Norman Regional of the 2010 NCAA Division I baseball tournament.

== Elimination ==
Because of the severe budget crisis that was/is facing the entire state of California and the University of California system specifically, on September 28, 2010, University of California, Berkeley Chancellor Robert Birgeneau announced that five intercollegiate sports programs would be eliminated at Cal and the baseball program was one of the five. The decision to cut the sports (other sports were the Men's Gymnastics, Women's Gymnastics, and Women's Lacrosse team along with the demotion of the then 25-time national champion Rugby program) sparked outrage amongst the Berkeley community and alumni and fundraising efforts almost immediately began to save the programs. Due to successful fundraising efforts thanks in part to the baseball program's supporters, three of the five were reinstated on February 11, 2011, however, baseball and men's gymnastics were still slated to end at the end of the 2010–11 academic year. After raising nearly 10 million dollars by the month of April, the chancellor announced the immediate reinstatement of the California Golden Bears baseball team on April 8. The Men's Gymnastics program was reinstated on May 2.

== Schedule ==
The season for California began on Sunday, February 20 with a home game against Utah, opening day was delayed twice due to rain in the San Francisco Bay Area. Their longest homestand was from March 16–17 (7 home games—originally 8), and their longest road trip was from May 3 through 24 (9 road games). Their final game of the regular season was on Saturday, May 29 at home against arch-rival Stanford. In 2011, the California Golden Bears baseball team won an at-large berth to the 2011 NCAA Division I baseball tournament and advanced to the Super Regionals. California then swept Dallas Baptist in Santa Clara to clinch a berth to the College World Series for the first time since 1992. The Golden Bears would go 1-2 in Omaha, defeating Texas A&M and losing twice to #1 national seed Virginia.

=== Game log ===
2011 California Golden Bears baseball game log: 38–23
Regular season (31–20)

February (5–1)
Date	Opponent	Rank	Site/Stadium	Score	Win	Loss	Save	Attendance	Overall record	Pac-10 record
February 18	Utah		Evans Diamond; Berkeley, CA	Postponed (rain); Rescheduled for February 19					0–0	–
February 19	Utah		Evans Diamond	Cancelled (rain)					0–0	–
February 19	Utah		Evans Diamond	Postponed (rain); Rescheduled for February 20					0–0	–
February 20	Utah		Evans Diamond	W 7–0	E. Johnson (1–0)	R. Anton (0–1)	K. Miller (1)	739	1–0	–
February 20	Utah		Evans Diamond	W 6–5	L. Scott (1–0)	J. Pond (0–1)	None	926	2–0	–
February 22	at No. 9 Stanford		Sunken Diamond; Stanford, CA	L 2–3	J. Pries (1–0)	D. Anderson (0–1)	S. Snodgrass (1)	1,931	2–1	–
February 25	at No. 24 Coastal Carolina		BB&T Coastal Field; Myrtle Beach, SC	W 17–0	K. Miller (1–0)	A. Meo (0–1)	None	594	3–1	–
February 26	vs. NC State		BB&T Coastal Field	W 4–0	E. Johnson (2–0)	C. Mazzoni (1–1)	K. Porter (1)	275	4–1	–
February 27	vs. Kansas State		BB&T Coastal Field	W 5–3	J. Jones (1–0)	L. Schlick (0–1)	None	315	5–1	–

March (12–4)
Date	Opponent	Rank	Site/Stadium	Score	Win	Loss	Save	Attendance	Overall record	Pac-10 record
March 3	at San Diego	No. 29	John Cunningham Stadium; San Diego, CA	W 6–2	D. Anderson (1–1)	D. Covey (1–1)	None	263	6–1	–
March 4	at San Diego State	No. 29	Tony Gwynn Stadium; San Diego, CA	L 1–2	E. Miller (1–1)	E. Johnson (2–1)	C. Rasmussen (1)	503	6–2	–
March 5	vs. No. 2 Oklahoma	No. 29	Tony Gwynn Stadium	L 3–5	B. Smith (2–0)	J. Jones (1–1)	J. Mayfield (3)	327	6–3	–
March 6	vs. Connecticut	No. 29	Tony Gwynn Stadium	L 1–3	M. Barnes (1–2)	K. Miller (1–1)	K. Vance (1)	218	6–4	–
March 8	Santa Clara		Evans Diamond	W 20–5	L. Lechich (1–0)	J. Westerberg (0–1)	None	286	7–4	–
March 11	vs. Louisiana–Lafayette		AT&T Park; San Francisco, CA	W 7–6	E. Johnson (3–1)	T. Hubbell (3–1)	M. Flemer (1)	500	8–4	–
March 12	vs. No. 23 Rice		AT&T Park	W 7–6 (15)	K. Porter (1–0)	J. Chargois (0–2)	None	1,200	9–4	–
March 13	vs. Long Beach State		AT&T Park	W 6–1	D. Anderson (2–1)	S. Stuart (2–1)	None	450	10–4	–
March 16	San Francisco	No. 29	Evans Diamond	L 6–7 (11)	A. Balog (2–0)	M. Flemer (0–1)	None	127	10–5	–
March 18	Ohio State	No. 29	Evans Diamond	Postponed (rain); Rescheduled for March 19					10–5	–
March 19	Ohio State	No. 29	Evans Diamond	PPD 4–0	Suspended (rain); Continued on March 20				10–5	–
March 19	Ohio State	No. 29	Evans Diamond	Cancelled (rain)					10–5	–
March 20	Ohio State	No. 29	Evans Diamond	W 4–0	J. Jones (2–1)	D. Wolosiansky (1–2)	None	113	11–5	–
March 20	Ohio State	No. 29	Evans Diamond	W 11–1	D. Anderson (3–1)	J. Kuchno (0–1)	None	113	12–5	–
March 21	Nevada	No. 27	Evans Diamond	W 2–0	K. Miller (2–1)	M. Joukoff (1–4)	M. Flemer (2)	120	13–5	–
March 25	Washington State	No. 27	Evans Diamond	W 7–0	E. Johnson (4–1)	A. Conley (4–2)	None	142	14–5	1–0
March 26	Washington State	No. 27	Evans Diamond	W 3–0	J. Jones (3–1)	J. Wise (2–2)	M. Flemer (3)	136	15–5	2–0
March 27	Washington State	No. 27	Evans Diamond	W 4–3 (11)	M. Flemer (1–1)	B. DeRooy (1–2)	None	353	16–5	3–0
March 29	at San Francisco	No. 19	Benedetti Diamond; San Francisco, CA	W 4–0	K. Miller (3–1)	A. Balog (2–1)	None	102	17–5	–

April (8–9)
Date	Opponent	Rank	Site/Stadium	Score	Win	Loss	Save	Attendance	Overall record	Pac-10 record
April 1	USC	No. 19	Evans Diamond	L 6–10	B. Wheatley (1–1)	L. Scott (1–1)	None	432	17–6	3–1
April 2	USC	No. 19	Evans Diamond	W 9–2	J. Jones (4–1)	A. Wood (1–5)	None	587	18–6	4–1
April 3	USC	No. 19	Evans Diamond	W 9–6	K. Porter (2–0)	L. Odom (2–4)	None	733	19–6	5–1
April 5	Pacific	No. 17	Evans Diamond	L 4–7	B. McMinn (1–0)	K. Miller (3–2)	M. Carvutto (2)	176	19–7	–
April 8	at No. 21 Arizona	No. 17	Sancet Stadium; Tucson, AZ	L 4–5	M. Chaffee (4–1)	M. Flemer (1–2)	None	1,103	19–8	5–2
April 9	at No. 21 Arizona	No. 17	Sancet Stadium	Postponed (rain); Rescheduled for April 10					19–8	–
April 10	at No. 21 Arizona	No. 17	Sancet Stadium	L 8–10	K. Simon (6–2)	J. Jones (4–2)	M. Chaffee (3)	1,095	19–9	5–3
April 10	at No. 21 Arizona	No. 17	Sancet Stadium	W 17–7	K. Miller (4–2)	T. Hale (3–3)	None	1,095	20–9	6–3
April 15	at Washington	No. 20	Husky Ballpark; Seattle, WA	W 6–2	E. Johnson (5–1)	G. Brown (1–3)	K. Porter (2)	482	21–9	7–3
April 16	at Washington	No. 20	Husky Ballpark	W 8–2	J. Jones (5–2)	A. West (1–6)	None	515	22–9	8–3
April 17	at Washington	No. 20	Husky Ballpark	W 4–3	D. Anderson (4–1)	A. Voth (1–4)	None	446	23–9	9–3
April 19	UC Davis	No. 19	Evans Diamond	W 4–1	K. Miller (5–2)	N. Slater (0–4)	None	159	24–9	–
April 21	No. 12 Arizona State	No. 19	Evans Diamond	L 4–6 (17)	M. Lambson (2–0)	L. Lechich (1–1)	None	426	24–10	9–4
April 22	No. 12 Arizona State	No. 19	Evans Diamond	L 0–5	K. Chaplin (6–1)	J. Jones (5–3)	None	560	24–11	9–5
April 23	No. 12 Arizona State	No. 19	Evans Diamond	L 0–6	J. Barrett (5–3)	D. Anderson (4–2)	None	1,005	24–12	9–6
April 25	at No. 27 Stanford	No. 24	Sunken Diamond	L 5–9	B. Busick (1–0)	K. Miller (5–3)	None	2,047	24–13	–
April 29	Oregon	No. 24	Evans Diamond	W 2–1	K. Porter (3–0)	S. McGough (1–5)	None	464	25–13	10–6
April 30	Oregon	No. 24	Evans Diamond	L 3–4	M. Boer (3–3)	J. Jones (5–4)	K. Moen (7)	846	25–14	10–7

May (6–6)
Date	Opponent	Rank	Site/Stadium	Score	Win	Loss	Save	Attendance	Overall record	Pac-10 record
May 1	Oregon	No. 24	Evans Diamond	W 5–4	M. Flemer (2–2)	S. McGough (1–6)	None	548	26–14	11–7
May 3	at Santa Clara	No. 24	Stephen Schott Stadium; Santa Clara, CA	W 4–1	K. Porter (4–0)	J. Supple (0–4)	M. Flemer (5)	271	27–14	–
May 6	at No. 4 Oregon State	No. 24	Goss Stadium; Corvallis, OR	Postponed (rain); Rescheduled for May 7					27–14	–
May 7	at No. 4 Oregon State	No. 24	Goss Stadium	L 0–3	S. Gaviglio (9–1)	E. Johnson (5–2)	T. Bryant (8)	2,511	27–15	11–8
May 7	at No. 4 Oregon State	No. 24	Goss Stadium	W 6–2	J. Jones (6–4)	J. Osich (6–2)	None	2,358	28–15	12–8
May 8	at No. 4 Oregon State	No. 24	Goss Stadium	L 2–4	B. Wetzler (6–2)	K. Miller (5–4)	T. Bryant (9)	2,511	28–16	12–9
May 18	at UC Davis	No. 25	Dobbins Stadium; Davis, CA	W 8–3	J. Jones (7–4)	S. Chew (1–1)	None	143	29–16	–
May 20	at No. 17 UCLA	No. 25	Jackie Robinson Stadium; Los Angeles, CA	W 4–0	E. Johnson (6–2)	G. Cole (5–7)	None	892	30–16	13–9
May 21	at No. 17 UCLA	No. 25	Jackie Robinson Stadium	L 1–2	T. Bauer (11–2)	D. Anderson (4–3)	None	1,379	30–17	13–10
May 22	at No. 17 UCLA	No. 25	Jackie Robinson Stadium	L 2–5	A. Plutko (6–3)	J. Jones (7–5)	N. Vander Tuig (8)	1,426	30–18	13–11
May 24	at Pacific	No. 23	Klein Family Field; Stockton, CA	W 8–3	K. Miller (6–4)	C. Larsen (1–3)	None	572	31–18	–
May 27	No. 26 Stanford	No. 23	Evans Diamond	L 2–3	M. Appel (5–6)	E. Johnson (6–3)	C. Reed (7)	652	31–19	13–12
May 28	No. 26 Stanford	No. 23	Evans Diamond	L 2–4	J. Pries (5–5)	J. Jones (7–6)	C. Reed (8)	1,358	31–20	13–13

Postseason (7–3)

NCAA tournament: Houston Regional (4–0)
Date	Opponent	Rank/Seed	Site/Stadium	Score	Win	Loss	Save	Attendance	Overall record	NCAAT record
June 3	vs. Baylor	(3) No. 30	Reckling Park; Houston, TX	L 4–6	L. Verrett (7–5)	E. Johnson (6–4)	M. Garner (3)	2,785	31–21	0–1
June 4	vs. Alcorn State	(3) No. 30	Reckling Park	W 10–6	J. Jones (8–6)	T. Williams (7–6)	None	2,428	32–21	1–1
June 5	at No. 17 (8) Rice	(3) No. 30	Reckling Park	W 6–3	M. Flemer (3–2)	T. Duffey (8–2)	None	2,391	33–21	2–1
June 5	vs. Baylor	(3) No. 30	Reckling Park	W 8–0	K. Porter (5–0)	B. Pinckard (5–3)	J. Jones (1)	2,411	34–21	3–1
June 6	vs. Baylor	(3) No. 30	Reckling Park	W 9–8	M. Flemer (4–2)	L. Verrett (7–6)	None	2,213	35–21	4–1

NCAA tournament: Santa Clara Super Regional (2–0)
Date	Opponent	Seed/Rank	Site/Stadium	Score	Win	Loss	Save	Attendance	Overall record	NCAAT record
June 11	No. 15 Dallas Baptist	No. 14	Stephen Schott Stadium	W 7–0	J. Jones (9–6)	B. Williamson (10–4)	None	1,431	36–21	5–1
June 12	No. 15 Dallas Baptist	No. 14	Stephen Schott Stadium	W 6–2	E. Johnson (7–4)	J. Stafford (8–5)	None	1,431	37–21	6–1

NCAA tournament: College World Series (1–2)
Date	Opponent	Seed/Rank	Site/Stadium	Score	Win	Loss	Save	Attendance	Overall record	CWS record
June 19	vs. (1) No. 2 Virginia	No. 8	TD Ameritrade Park Omaha; Omaha, NE	L 0–4	T. Wilson (9–0)	L. Scott (1–2)	B. Kline (18)	21,275	37–22	0–1
June 21	vs. No. 6 Texas A&M	No. 8	TD Ameritrade Park Omaha	W 7–3	K. Porter (6–0)	M. Wacha (9–4)	M. Fleming (6)	18,141	38–22	1–1
June 21	vs. (1) No. 2 Virginia	No. 8	TD Ameritrade Park Omaha	L 1–8	T. Wilson (10–0)	D. Anderson (4–4)	None	25,833	38–23	1–2

Legend: = Win = Loss = Canceled
Bold =California team member
Rankings are based on the team's current ranking in the Collegiate Baseball poll or NCAA tournament seeding for postseason play.

== Roster ==
2011 California Golden Bears baseball team
Players
Coaches

#	Pos.	Name	B/T	Height	Weight	Year	Previous school	Home town
48	RHP	Dixon Anderson	R/R	6 ft 6 in (1.98 m)	224 lb (102 kg)	Jr	Piedmont HS	Piedmont, CA
43	RHP	Joey Donofrio	R/R	6 ft 3 in (1.91 m)	188 lb (85 kg)	Jr	Los Gatos HS	Los Gatos, CA
18	LHP	Matt Evanoff	L/L	6 ft 0 in (1.83 m)	208 lb (94 kg)	So	Ponderosa HS	Rescue, CA
49	RHP	Matt Flemer	R/R	6 ft 2 in (1.88 m)	216 lb (98 kg)	Jr	St. Mary's HS	El Cerrito, CA
26	RHP	Trevor Hildenberger	R/R	6 ft 2 in (1.88 m)	192 lb (87 kg)	So	Archbishop Mitty HS	San Jose, CA
35	RHP	Erik Johnson	R/R	6 ft 2 in (1.88 m)	240 lb (109 kg)	Jr	Los Altos HS	Los Altos, CA
23	LHP	Justin Jones	L/L	6 ft 2 in (1.88 m)	188 lb (85 kg)	So	Oakdale HS	Oakdale, CA
25	LHP	Louie Lechich	L/L	6 ft 3 in (1.91 m)	207 lb (94 kg)	Fr	St. Mary's HS	Stockton, CA
29	RHP	Michael Lowden	R/R	6 ft 3 in (1.91 m)	185 lb (84 kg)	So	Yuba City HS	Yuba City, CA
41	RHP	Kevin Miller	R/R	6 ft 0 in (1.83 m)	207 lb (94 kg)	Sr	Valley Christian HS	San Jose, CA
21	RHP	Stephen Pistoresi	R/R	6 ft 0 in (1.83 m)	206 lb (93 kg)	Sr	San Joaquin Memorial HS	Fresno, CA
16	LHP	Kyle Porter	L/L	6 ft 2 in (1.88 m)	192 lb (87 kg)	Fr	Oakridge HS	El Dorado Hills, CA
36	RHP	Ryan Sandler	R/R	6 ft 2 in (1.88 m)	210 lb (95 kg)	Fr	Canyon Crest Academy	Solana Beach, CA
20	RHP	Logan Scott	R/R	6 ft 4 in (1.93 m)	216 lb (98 kg)	Jr	Serra HS	San Mateo, CA
24	RHP	Seth Spivack	S/R	6 ft 0 in (1.83 m)	196 lb (89 kg)	Fr	Taft HS	Calabasas, CA
10	LHP	Michael Theofanopoulos	L/L	5 ft 10 in (1.78 m)	191 lb (87 kg)	Fr	Foothill HS	Pleasanton, CA
32	RHP	Eric Walbridge	R/R	5 ft 8 in (1.73 m)	193 lb (88 kg)	Fr	Notre Dame HS	Los Angeles, CA
9	C	Alex Egber	R/R	6 ft 1 in (1.85 m)	205 lb (93 kg)	Fr	Montgomery Blair HS	Potomac, MD
6	C	Andrew Knapp	S/R	6 ft 0 in (1.83 m)	191 lb (87 kg)	Fr	Granite Bay HS	Granite Bay, CA
27	C	Chadd Krist	R/R	5 ft 11 in (1.8 m)	199 lb (90 kg)	Jr	Petaluma HS	Petaluma, CA
38	C	Alexander Neuhaus	R/R	5 ft 11 in (1.8 m)	189 lb (86 kg)	Fr	Berkeley HS	Berkeley, CA
1	INF	Austin Booker	L/R	5 ft 10 in (1.78 m)	170 lb (77 kg)	Sr	Robinson HS	Fairfax, VA
5	INF	Derek Campbell	R/R	6 ft 0 in (1.83 m)	172 lb (78 kg)	Fr	Mater Dei HS	Irvine, CA
44	INF	Mitch Delfino	R/R	6 ft 3 in (1.91 m)	209 lb (95 kg)	So	Cloverdale HS	Cloverdale, CA
14	INF	Tony Renda	R/R	6 ft 3 in (1.91 m)	209 lb (95 kg)	So	Serra HS	Hillsborough, CA
33	INF	Devon Rodriguez	L/R	6 ft 2 in (1.88 m)	209 lb (95 kg)	So	William S. Hart HS	Santa Clarita, CA
15	INF	Marcus Semien	R/R	6 ft 0 in (1.83 m)	191 lb (87 kg)	Jr	St. Mary's HS	El Cerrito, CA
30	INF	Paul Toboni	R/R	6 ft 2 in (1.88 m)	202 lb (92 kg)	Jr	St. Ignatius HS	San Francisco, CA
51	INF	Jacob Wark	L/R	6 ft 3 in (1.91 m)	240 lb (109 kg)	Fr	Jesuit HS	Portland, OR
22	OF	Vince Bruno	L/R	5 ft 10 in (1.78 m)	170 lb (77 kg)	So	Los Medanos College	Concord, CA
45	OF	Chad Bunting	R/R	5 ft 11 in (1.8 m)	186 lb (84 kg)	Jr	Ukiah HS	Ukiah, CA
31	OF	David Buscovich	L/L	5 ft 10 in (1.78 m)	206 lb (93 kg)	Jr	Diablo Valley College	San Leandro, CA
2	OF	Darrel Matthews	L/R	5 ft 9 in (1.75 m)	158 lb (72 kg)	So	Clayton Valley HS	Concord, CA
34	OF	Maris Moore	R/R	6 ft 3 in (1.91 m)	211 lb (96 kg)	Jr	California HS	San Ramon, CA
19	OF	Danny Oh	L/L	6 ft 0 in (1.83 m)	196 lb (89 kg)	Jr	Henry M> Jackson HS	Mill Creek, WA
11	OF	Dwight Tanaka	R/R	5 ft 8 in (1.73 m)	187 lb (85 kg)	Sr	Campolindo HS	El Sobrante, CA

Head coach

David Esquer

Assistant coach(es)

Tony Arnerich
Dan Hubbs
Brad Sanfilippo

Legend

- (C) Team captain
- (S) Suspended
- (I) Ineligible
- Injured
- Current redshirt

Roster
Last update: June 7, 2011

== Golden Bears in the 2011 MLB Draft ==
The following members of the California baseball program were drafted in the 2011 Major League Baseball draft.

Player	Position	Round	Overall	MLB team
Erik Johnson	RHP	2nd	80th	Chicago White Sox
Marcus Semien	SS	6th	201st	Chicago White Sox
Dixon Anderson	RHP	9th	277th	Washington Nationals
Chadd Krist	C	13th	411th	Chicago White Sox
Kevin Miller	RHP	18th	550th	Houston Astros
Matt Flemer	RHP	19th	576th	Kansas City Royals
Austin Booker	2B	33rd	1006th	Oakland Athletics
