= 2011 Arizona Wildcats baseball team =

Baseball team

2011 Arizona Wildcats baseball

College Station Regional
- Conference: Pacific-10 Conference
- Record: 39–21 (15–12 Pac-10)
- Head coach: Andy Lopez (10th season)
- Assistant coaches: Mark Wasikowski (10th season); Shaun Cole (2nd season); Brett Scyphers (2nd season)
- Home stadium: Sancet Stadium

The 2011 Arizona Wildcats baseball team represented the University of Arizona in the 2011 NCAA Division I baseball season. The Wildcats played their home games for the final season at Jerry Kindall Field at Frank Sancet Stadium. Following the season, the team would move to the off-campus Hi Corbett Field. The team was coached by Andy Lopez in his 10th season at Arizona.

== Personnel ==
=== Roster ===
2011 Pacific-10 Conference baseball standings
	Conf.				Overall
Team	W		L	PCT	W		L	PCT
No. 18 UCLA ‍†‍‍^{y}	18	–	9	.667	35	–	24	.593
No. 11 Arizona State ‍‍‍^{y}	17	–	10	.630	42	–	16	.724
No. 16 Oregon State ‍‍‍^{y}	17	–	10	.630	41	–	17	.707
Arizona ‍‍‍^{y}	15	–	12	.556	39	–	21	.650
No. 21 Stanford ‍‍‍^{y}	14	–	12	.538	35	–	20	.636
California ‍‍‍^{y}	13	–	13	.500	35	–	21	.625
USC ‍‍‍	13	–	14	.481	25	–	31	.446
Oregon ‍‍‍	11	–	16	.407	33	–	26	.559
Washington State ‍‍‍	10	–	17	.370	26	–	28	.481
Washington ‍‍‍	6	–	21	.222	17	–	37	.315
† – Conference champion ‡ – Pac-10 Conference champion y – Invited to the 2011 NCAA Division I baseball tournament As of June 8, 2011; Rankings from Coaches' Poll

2011 Arizona Wildcats roster
Pitchers • 10 – Tyler Hale – Sophomore • 11 – Jacob Doyle – Freshman • 14 – Vincent Littleman – Sophomore • 18 – Kyle Simon – Junior • 23 – Bryce Bandilla – Junior • 26 – Kurt Heyer – Sophomore • 29 – Matt Veltmann – RS Junior • 31 – Stephen Manthei – Sophomore • 33 – Augie Bill – Sophomore • 36 – James Farris – Freshman • 42 – Nick Cunningham – Sophomore • 43 – Daniel Ponce de Leon – Freshman • 45 – Michael Lopez – RS Sophomore • 46 – Matt Chaffee – RS Junior • 47 – Glenn Silva – Junior • 48 – Konner Wade – Freshman	Catchers • 21 – Nate Sherman – Freshman • 27 – Jett Bandy – Junior • 30 – Jake Meskin – RS Senior • 39 – TC Mark – Freshman Infielders • 3 – Johnny Field – Freshman • 5 – Seth Mejias-Brean – Sophomore • 13 – Alex Mejia – Sophomore • 20 – Josh Garcia – Senior • 22 – Brandon Dixon – Freshman • 24 – Cole Frenzel – Sophomore • 25 – Andrew Burns – Junior • 28 – David Lopez – RS Freshman • 38 – Bryce Ortega – Senior	Outfielders • 2 – Robert Refsnyder – Sophomore • 4 – Bobby Rinard – Senior • 6 – Steve Selsky – Junior • 15 – Cory LeBrun – Freshman • 35 – Joey Rickard – Sophomore • 37 – Bobby Brown – RS Junior

=== Coaches ===
2011 Arizona Wildcats baseball coaching staff
- Andy Lopez – Head coach
- Mark Wasikowski – Assistant coach
- Shaun Cole – Assistant coach
- Brett Scyphers – Volunteer Assistant

=== Opening day ===
Opening Day Starters
Name	Position
Joey Rickard	Center fielder
Cole Frenzel	First baseman
Jett Bandy	Catcher
Robert Refsnyder	Right fielder
Josh Garcia	Designated hitter
Bobby Brown	Left fielder
Seth Mejias-Brean	Third baseman
Alex Mejia	Shortstop
Bryce Ortega	Second baseman
Kurt Heyer	Starting pitcher

== Schedule and results ==
2011 Arizona Wildcats baseball game log
Regular season
Date	Opponent	Rank	Site/stadium	Score	Win	Loss	Save	Overall Record	Pac-12 Record
Feb 18	vs North Dakota State	#19	Sancet Stadium • Tucson, AZ	W 10–0	Heyer (1–0)	Kingsley (0–1)	None	1–0	
Feb 19	vs North Dakota State	#19	Sancet Stadium • Tucson, AZ	W 12–1	Simon (1–0)	Hermes (0–1)	None	2–0	
Feb 20	vs North Dakota State	#19	Sancet Stadium • Tucson, AZ	W 8–1	Hale (1–0)	Wentz (0–1)	None	3–0	
Feb 25	at Long Beach State	#17	Blair Field • Long Beach, CA	L 1–2	Gagnon (1–1)	Heyer (1–1)	Stuart (2)	3–1	
Feb 26	at Long Beach State	#17	Blair Field • Long Beach, CA	W 9–1	Simon (2–0)	Johnson (0–1)	None	4–1	
Feb 27	at Long Beach State	#17	Blair Field • Long Beach, CA	W 7–1	Hale (2–0)	Pinder (0–2)	None	5–1	
Mar 1	vs #21 Rice	#17	Sancet Stadium • Tucson, AZ	W 10–8	Bandilla (1–0)	Benak (1–1)	None	6–1	
Mar 2	vs #21 Rice	#17	Sancet Stadium • Tucson, AZ	L 7–11	McDowell (1–1)	Littleman (0–1)	None	6–2	
Mar 4	vs Utah Valley	#17	Sancet Stadium • Tucson, AZ	W 6–5	Wade (1–0)	Gendlek (0–2)	Bandilla (1)	7–2	
Mar 5	vs Utah Valley	#17	Sancet Stadium • Tucson, AZ	W 6–3	Simon (3–0)	Campbell (0–2)	Cunningham (1)	8–2	
Mar 6	vs Utah Valley	#17	Sancet Stadium • Tucson, AZ	W 9–3	Chaffee (1–0)	Chadwick (0–1)	None	9–2	
Mar 8	at UNLV	#14	Earl Wilson Stadium • Paradise, NV	W 12–1	Littleman (1–1)	Dysinger (2–1)	None	10–2	
Mar 9	at UNLV	#14	Earl Wilson Stadium • Paradise, NV	L 7–9	Zuniga (1–1)	Chaffee (1–1)	Hartman (4)	10–3	
Mar 11	vs Northern Colorado	#14	Sancet Stadium • Tucson, AZ	W 11–1	Heyer (2–1)	Sawicki (0–2)	None	11–3	
Mar 12	vs Northern Colorado	#14	Sancet Stadium • Tucson, AZ	W 12–4	Simon (4–0)	Tinnon (0–2)	None	12–3	
Mar 13	vs Northern Colorado	#14	Sancet Stadium • Tucson, AZ	W 2–1	Chaffee (2–1)	Willman (0–2)	Doyle (1)	13–3	
Mar 15	at Wichita State	#11	Eck Stadium • Wichita, KS	L 5–6	Elam (1–0)	Bandilla (1–1)	None	13–4	
Mar 16	at Wichita State	#11	Eck Stadium • Wichita, KS	L 3–8	Lowell (3–2)	Littleman (1–2)	McGreevy (1)	13–5	
Mar 19	vs San Francisco	#11	Sancet Stadium • Tucson, AZ	W 14–0	Heyer (3–1)	Lujan (2–2)	None	14–5	
Mar 20	vs San Francisco	#11	Sancet Stadium • Tucson, AZ	W 7–0	Simon (5–0)	Zimmer (1–3)	None	15–5	
Mar 21	vs San Francisco	#11	Sancet Stadium • Tucson, AZ	W 8–5	Hale (3–0)	Hiserman (2–2)	Chaffee (1)	16–5	
Mar 25	at #6 Arizona State	#15	Packard Stadium • Tempe, AZ	W 5–2	Heyer (4–1)	Champlin (3–1)	Chaffee (2)	17–5	1–0
Mar 26	at #6 Arizona State	#15	Packard Stadium • Tempe, AZ	L 1–5	Rodgers (3–1)	Simon (5–1)	None	17–6	1–1
Mar 27	at #6 Arizona State	#15	Packard Stadium • Tempe, AZ	L 1–8	Barrett (2–2)	Hale (3–1)	None	17–7	1–2
Mar 29	vs New Mexico	#18	Sancet Stadium • Tucson, AZ	W 12–3	Bandilla (2–1)	Olson (1–3)	None	18–7	
Mar 30	vs New Mexico	#18	Sancet Stadium • Tucson, AZ	W 10–9	Chaffee (3–1)	Maltz (1–2)	None	19–7	
Apr 1	vs #23 Oregon State	#18	Sancet Stadium • Tucson, AZ	W 18–0	Heyer (5–1)	Gaviglio (5–1)	None	20–7	2–2
Apr 2	vs #23 Oregon State	#18	Sancet Stadium • Tucson, AZ	L 4–10	Osich (4–0)	Simon (5–2)	Bryant (3)	20–8	2–3
Apr 3	vs #23 Oregon State	#18	Sancet Stadium • Tucson, AZ	L 4–8	Wetzler (4–1)	Hale (3–2)	None	20–9	2–4
Apr 5	vs #5 Arizona State	#22	Sancet Stadium • Tucson, AZ	L 5–10	Blackford (3–0)	Littleman (1–3)	None	20–10	
Apr 8	vs #13 California	#22	Sancet Stadium • Tucson, AZ	W 5–4	Chaffee (4–1)	Flemer (1–2)	None	21–10	3–4
Apr 10	vs #13 California	#22	Sancet Stadium • Tucson, AZ	W 10–8	Simon (6–2)	Jones (4–2)	Chaffee (3)	22–10	4–4
Apr 10	vs #13 California	#22	Sancet Stadium • Tucson, AZ	L 7–17	Miller (4–2)	Hale (3–3)	None	22–11	4–5
Apr 15	at #23 UCLA	#20	Jackie Robinson Stadium • Los Angeles, CA	W 5–4	Heyer (6–1)	Cole (4–2)	Chaffee (4)	23–11	5–5
Apr 16	at #23 UCLA	#20	Jackie Robinson Stadium • Los Angeles, CA	L 0–4	Bauer (7–1)	Simon (6–3)	None	23–12	5–6
Apr 17	at #23 UCLA	#20	Jackie Robinson Stadium • Los Angeles, CA	L 5–8	Vander Tuig (3–2)	Chaffee (4–2)	None	23–13	5–7
Apr 21	at Oregon	#23	PK Park • Eugene, OR	L 2–4	Anderson (6–1)	Heyer (6–2)	None	23–14	5–8
Apr 22	at Oregon	#23	PK Park • Eugene, OR	W 2–1	Simon (7–3)	Boer (2–3)	None	24–14	6–8
Apr 23	at Oregon	#23	PK Park • Eugene, OR	L 3–7	Keudell (5–3)	Hale (3–4)	McGough (4)	24–15	6–9
Apr 26	vs #8 Arizona State		Sancet Stadium • Tucson, AZ	L 3–4	Blackford (4–0)	Heyer (6–3)	Lambson (6)	24–16	
Apr 29	vs Southern California		Sancet Stadium • Tucson, AZ	W 4–3	Chaffee (5–2)	Garcia (2–4)	None	25–16	7–9
Apr 30	vs Southern California		Sancet Stadium • Tucson, AZ	W 20–4	Littleman (2–3)	Wood (4–6)	None	26–16	8–9
May 1	vs Southern California		Sancet Stadium • Tucson, AZ	W 8–5	Bandilla (3–1)	Mount (1–2)	Chaffee (5)	27–16	9–9
May 6	vs Alcorn State		Sancet Stadium • Tucson, AZ	W 10–2	Simon (8–3)	Easter (7–3)	None	28–16	
May 7	vs Alcorn State		Sancet Stadium • Tucson, AZ	W 8–2	Heyer (7–3)	Williams (6–4)	None	29–16	
May 8	vs Alcorn State		Sancet Stadium • Tucson, AZ	W 15–2	Wade (2–0)	Vicars (4–2)	None	30–16	
May 14	at Washington State		Bailey-Brayton Field • Pullman, WA	L 6–7	Drobnick (1–1)	Chaffee (5–3)	None	30–17	9–10
May 15	at Washington State		Bailey-Brayton Field • Pullman, WA	W 8–1	Simon (9–3)	Arnold (2–4)	None	31–17	10–10
May 16	at Washington State		Bailey-Brayton Field • Pullman, WA	W 6–4	Bandilla (4–1)	Wise (4–6)	Chaffee (6)	32–17	11–10
May 20	at Stanford		Sunken Diamond • Palo Alto, CA	L 0–1	Reed (5–2)	Bandilla (4–2)	None	32–18	11–11
May 21	at Stanford		Sunken Diamond • Palo Alto, CA	W 7–3	Simon (10–3)	Snodgress (3–1)	Chaffee (7)	33–18	12–11
May 22	at Stanford		Sunken Diamond • Palo Alto, CA	L 1–2	Reed (6–2)	Bandilla (4–3)	None	33–19	12–12
May 27	vs Washington		Sancet Stadium • Tucson, AZ	W 9–0	Heyer (8–3)	Brown (1–8)	None	34–19	13–12
May 28	vs Washington		Sancet Stadium • Tucson, AZ	W 6–5	Chaffee (6–3)	Cimber (4–5)	None	35–19	14–12
May 29	vs Washington		Sancet Stadium • Tucson, AZ	W 8–2	Bandilla (5–3)	Clem (4–6)	None	36–19	15–12
NCAA College Station Regional
Jun 3	at (3) Seton Hall	#22	Olsen Field • College Station, TX	L 0–4	Prosinski (7–4)	Heyer (8–4)	None	36–20	
Jun 4	at (4) Wright State	#22	Olsen Field • College Station, TX	W 13–0	Simon (11–3)	Henn (7–4)	None	37–20	
Jun 5	at (3) Seton Hall	#22	Olsen Field • College Station, TX	W 6–0	Wade (3–0)	Gilbert (2–4)	None	38–20	
Jun 5	at (1) #6 Texas A&M	#22	Olsen Field • College Station, TX	W 7–4	Cunningham (1–0)	Martin (2–2)	None	39–20	
Jun 7	at (1) #6 Texas A&M	#22	Olsen Field • College Station, TX	L 0–3	Fleece (7–1)	Heyer (8–5)	Stripling (4)	39–21	

=== College Station Regional ===
College Station Regional Teams
(1) Texas A&M Aggies	(4) Wright State Raiders	(2) Arizona Wildcats	(3) Seton Hall Pirates

== 2011 MLB draft ==
Player	Position	Round	Overall	MLB team
Kyle Simon	RHP	4	125	Baltimore Orioles
Bryce Bandilla	LHP	4	147	San Francisco Giants
Cole Frenzel	1B	7	222	New York Mets
Gil Luna	LHP	9	275	Chicago White Sox
Andy Burns	SS	11	349	Toronto Blue Jays
Matt Chaffee	LHP	12	386	Atlanta Braves
Jett Bandy	C	31	945	Los Angeles Angels of Anaheim
Steve Selsky	RF	33	1015	Cincinnati Reds
Bryce Ortega	3B	41	1237	Washington Nationals
