= 2011 NCAA Division I baseball rankings =

2011 NCAA Division I baseball season
- Duration: February 18, 2011–June 29, 2011
- Number of teams: 300
- Preseason No. 1: Florida Gators; TCU Horned Frogs; UCLA Bruins

Tournament
- Duration: June 3–29, 2011
- Most conference bids: ACC and SEC (7)

College World Series
- Champions: South Carolina (2nd title)
- Runners-up: Florida
- MOP: Scott Wingo, USC

Seasons
- ← 2010 2012 →

The following human polls make up the 2011 NCAA Division I men's baseball rankings for the 2011 NCAA Division I baseball season. The USA Today/ESPN Coaches Poll is voted on by a panel of 31 Division I baseball coaches. The Baseball America poll is voted on by staff members of the Baseball America magazine. These polls rank the top 25 teams nationally. Collegiate Baseball and the National Collegiate Baseball Writers Association rank the top 30 teams nationally.

== Legend ==
	Increase in ranking
	Decrease in ranking
	Not ranked previous week
Italics	Number of first place votes
(#-#)	Win–loss record
т	Tied with team above or below also with this symbol

== USA Today/ESPN Coaches' Poll ==
	Preseason Jan 27	Week 1 Feb 28	Week 2 Mar 7	Week 3 Mar 14	Week 4 Mar 21	Week 5 Mar 28	Week 6 Apr 4	Week 7 Apr 11	Week 8 Apr 18	Week 9 Apr 25	Week 10 May 2	Week 11 May 9	Week 12 May 16	Week 13 May 23	Week 14 May 30	Week 15 Jun 29	
1.	UCLA	Florida (7–0)	Florida (10–1)	Florida (14–2)	Florida (18–2)	Virginia (24–2)	Vanderbilt (26–3)	Vanderbilt (30–3)	Virginia (36–3)	Virginia (40–4)	Virginia (42–5)	Virginia (43–5)	Virginia (45–6)	South Carolina (44–12)	Virginia (49–9)	South Carolina (55–14)	1.
2.	TCU	Vanderbilt (7–1)	Oklahoma (14–0)	Vanderbilt (16–1)	Vanderbilt (19–2)	Vanderbilt (22–3)	Virginia (28–2)	Virginia (31–3)	South Carolina (28–7)	Vanderbilt (35–4)	Vanderbilt (38–5)	Vanderbilt (40–6)	South Carolina (41–11)	Vanderbilt (44–9)	Vanderbilt (47–10)	Florida (53–19)	2.
3.	Florida	Oklahoma (9–0)	Vanderbilt (11–1)	Oklahoma (16–1)	Virginia (19–2)	Florida (21–4)	South Carolina (22–5)	South Carolina (26–5)	Vanderbilt (32–5)	South Carolina (31–8)	South Carolina (35–8)	South Carolina (37–10)	Vanderbilt (42–8)	Virginia (45–9)	Florida (45–16)	Vanderbilt (54–12)	3.
4.	Vanderbilt	South Carolina (6–0)	South Carolina (8–1)	Florida State (15–1)	South Carolina (14–4)	South Carolina (18–5)	Florida (24–5)	Florida (26–7)	Texas (27–9)	Florida (31–10)	Florida (34–10)	Texas (36–12)	Florida (39–13)	Texas (40–13)	South Carolina (45–14)	Virginia (56–12)	4.
5.	Clemson	UCLA (5–2)	Florida State (10–1)	Virginia (16–1)	Florida State (16–4)	Texas A&M (19–5)	Texas A&M (22–6)	North Carolina (29–5)	Florida (28–9)	Texas (30–10)	Texas (33–11)	Florida (36–12)	Texas (38–12)	Florida (41–15)	Texas (43–15)	North Carolina (51–16)	5.
6.	Oklahoma	Florida State (7–0)	Virginia (12–1)	South Carolina (11–2)	Texas (15–5)	North Carolina (23–3)	Arizona State (21–6)	Texas A&M (24–8)	Cal State Fullerton (27–9)	Texas A&M (29–11)	Florida State (33–11)	Florida State (36–12)	Florida State (39–13)	North Carolina (44–12)	Florida State (42–17)	Texas A&M (47–22)	6.
7.	Texas	Clemson (5–1)	Clemson (7–2)	LSU (15–1)	Oklahoma (17–5)	Florida State (18–6)т	North Carolina (26–4)	Texas (24–8)	Texas A&M (26–10)	Arizona State (28–9)	Oregon State (32–9)	Arizona State (35–11)	Oregon State (37–12)	TCU (40–15)	North Carolina (45–14)	Texas (49–19)	7.
8.	South Carolina	TCU (4–3)	LSU (11–1)	Arizona State (11–3)	Arizona State (15–4)	Texas (17–7)т	Texas (21–7)	Florida State (23–9)	Oregon State (27–7)	Florida State (31–10	Arizona State (31–10)	Oregon State (34–11)	Oklahoma (39–13)	Florida State (40–15)	Texas A&M (42–18)	California (38–23)	8.
9.	Cal State Fullerton	LSU (7–0)	Arizona State (9–2)	Arkansas (13–2)	Texas A&M (15–5)	Arizona State (18–6)	Oklahoma (22–6)	Cal State Fullerton (23–9)	Arizona State (25–9)	Oregon state (29–8)	Texas A&M (30–14)	North Carolina (37–10)	TCU (36–15)	Arizona State (38–14)	Cal State Fullerton (40–15)	Florida State (46–19)	9.
10.	Oregon	Virginia (6–1)	UCLA (7–4)	Texas (11–5)	LSU (16–4)	Georgia Tech (21–4)	Florida State (21–7)	Arizona State (22–9)т	North Carolina (30–8)	TCU (29–11)	TCU (31–13)	TCU (33–14)	Cal State Fullerton (36–14)	Oregon State (38–14)	TCU (42–17)	Arizona State (43–18)	10.
11.	Florida State	Arizona State (6–1)	TCU (7–4)	UC Irvine (12–1)	UC Irvine (14–2)	Oklahoma (19–6)	Georgia Tech (23–6)	Oklahoma (24–8)т	Florida State (26–10)	Georgia Tech (30–11)	Cal State Fullerton (30–13)	Cal State Fullerton (33–13)	Texas A&M (36–16)	Cal State Fullerton (37–14)	Arizona State (39–16)	Oregon State (41–19)	11.
12.	Arizona State	Texas (5–3)	Cal State Fullerton (8–3)	TCU (10–5)	North Carolina (18–3)	Fresno State (18–2)	Fresno State (20–3)	Georgia Tech (24–9)	Georgia Tech (27–10)	Cal State Fullerton (28–11)	North Carolina (33–10)	Oklahoma (35–13)	Arizona State (36–13)	Oklahoma (40–15)	Clemson (41–18)	UC Irvine (43–18)	12.
13.	Texas A&M	Texas A&M (6–1)	Texas (7–4)	Texas A&M (12–4)	Arkansas (15–4)	Arkansas (18–6)	Cal State Fullerton (20–8)	Fresno State (22–5)	Fresno State (25–5)	Oklahoma (29–11)	Oklahoma (31–13)	Georgia Tech (33–14)	North Carolina (40–12)	Texas A&M (38–18)	Rice (41–19)	Stanford (35–22)	13.
14.	Virginia	Cal State Fullerton (4–3)	Arkansas (10–1)	Arizona (13–3)	TCU (12–7)	TCU (15–8)	TCU (18–9)	TCU (22–10)	TCU (25–11)	North Carolina (32–10)	Georgia Tech (31–14)	Texas A&M (32–16)	Georgia Tech (37–15)	Clemson (39–17)	Georgia Tech (40–19)	Connecticut (45–20–1)	14.
15.	LSU	Stanford (4–3)	Texas A&M (9–3)	North Carolina (14–3)	Georgia Tech (17–4)	Cal State Fullerton (16–8)	LSU (20–8)	Oregon State (24–7)	Oklahoma (26–10)	Fresno State (28–7)	Southern Miss (32–11)	Southern Miss (36–11)	Clemson (36–16)	Georgia Tech (39–17)	Oklahoma (41–17)	Mississippi State (38–25)	15.
16.	Stanford	Arkansas (6–0)	North Carolina (11–1)	UCLA (8–6)	Arizona (15–5)	LSU (17–7)	UC Irvine (18–6)	Arkansas (23–8)	Arkansas (26–9)	Arkansas (28–11)	Clemson (29–15)	Clemson (32–15)	UC Irvine (34–13)	UC Irvine (37–14)	Oregon State (38–17)	Clemson Tigers (43–20)	16.
17.	Rice	Arizona (5–1)	Arizona (9–2)	Clemson (7–6)	Fresno State (14–2)	Arizona (17–7)	Southern Miss (22–5)	UC Irvine (20–8)	Oklahoma State (27–9)	Southern Miss (30–9)	Fresno State (29–9)	Arkansas (32–15)	Southern Miss (37–13)	Rice (38–18)	UC Irvine (39–16)	Cal State Fullerton (41–17)	17.
18.	Miami	North Carolina (6–1)	UC Irvine (8–1)	Cal State Fullerton (8–6)	Cal State Fullerton (11–7)	California (16–5)	California (19–6)	UCLA (16–11)	UC Irvine (23–9)	UC Irvine (26–10)	Arkansas (29–13)	UC Irvine (31–13)	Arkansas (33–17)	Arkansas (36–18)	UCLA (33–22)	Dallas Baptist (42–20)	18.
19.	Georgia Tech	UC Irvine (7–0)	Stanford (6–5)	Fresno State (11–2)	Clemson (10–7)	UC Irvine (14–6)	Oregon State (20–7)	Arizona (22–11)	California (23–9)	Miami (27–13)	UC Irvine (28–12)	UCLA (27–16)	Fresno State (36–11)	UCLA (31–20)	Arkansas (38–20)	TCU (43–19)	19.
20.	Coastal Carolina	Rice (5–3)	Rice (8–5)	Louisville (11–3)	Auburn (14–6)	Oregon State (18–6)	Stanford (13–7)	Southern Miss (23–8)	UCLA (19–12)	UCLA (21–14)	Miami (29–15)	Rice (32–16)	Rice (35–17)	Southern Miss (38–15)	Fresno State (40–14)	Georgia Tech (42–21)	20.
21.	Louisville	Oregon (4–3)	Louisville (8–2)	Georgia Tech (12–4)	UCLA (8–6)	Stanford (10–6)	Arizona (20–9)	Oklahoma State (24–8)	Southern Miss (27–8)	Oklahoma State (28–12)	Oklahoma State (30–13)	Fresno State (32–11)	UCLA (29–19)	Miami (34–20)	Stanford (32–20)	Rice (42–21)	21.
22.	Connecticut	California (5–1)	Fresno State (8–1)	Stanford (6–5)	Oregon State (15–4)	Southern Miss (18–5)	Arkansas (19–8)	California (20–9)	Rice (26–14)	California (24–12)	UCLA (23–16)	Stetson (37–10)	Miami (32–18)	Connecticut (39–15–1)	Southern Miss (39–17)	UCLA (35–24)	22.
23.	Auburn	Georgia Tech (5–3)	College of Charleston (10–2)	College of Charleston (14–3)	Stanford (6–5)	Clemson (13–9)	UCLA (14–9)	Stanford (15–9)	Arizona (23–13)	Clemson (25–14)	Rice (28–16)	Miami (31–16)	Stetson (39–13)	Fresno State (37–14)	Miami (36–21)	Arkansas (40–22)	23.
24.	Arkansas	Louisville (4–2)	Auburn (9–3)	Rice (10–8)	Tulane (16–4)	UCLA (11–8)	Alabama (21–9)	LSU (21–11)	Miami (24–12)	Rice (28–16)	Stetson (34–10)	Oklahoma State (31–15)	Connecticut (36–14–1)	Stanford (30–19)	Connecticut (41–17–1)	Miami (38–23)	24.
25.	Arizona	College of Charleston (7–0)	Wichita State (9–2)	California (10–4)	California (12–5)	Alabama (18–7)	Rice (21–11)	Troy (25–6)	Stetson (29–7)	Stanford (19–13)	California (26–14)	Stanford (25–16)	Stanford (28–18)	Creighton (39–13)	Creighton (44–14)	Arizona (39–21)	25.
	Preseason Jan 27	Week 1 Feb 28	Week 2 Mar 7	Week 3 Mar 14	Week 4 Mar 21	Week 5 Mar 28	Week 6 Apr 4	Week 7 Apr 11	Week 8 Apr 18	Week 9 Apr 25	Week 10 May 2	Week 11 May 9	Week 12 May 16	Week 13 May 23	Week 14 May 30	Week 15 Jun 29	
		Dropped: 18 Miami (4–3); 20 Coastal Carolina (4–4); 22 Connecticut (2–4); 23 Auburn (5–2)	Dropped: 21 Oregon (5–6); 22 California (6–4); 23 Georgia Tech (8–4)	Dropped: 24 Auburn (11–5); 25 Wichita State (10–4)	Dropped: 20 Louisville (12–7); 23 College of Charleston (15–6); 24 Rice (13–9)	Dropped: 20 Auburn (14–10); 24 Tulane (18–6)	Dropped: 23 Clemson (14–12)	Dropped: 24 Alabama; 25 Rice	Dropped: 23 Stanford (16–12); 24 LSU (23–14); 25 Troy (26–9)	Dropped: 23 Arizona; 25 Stetson	Dropped: 25 Stanford	Dropped: 25 California	Dropped: 24 Oklahoma State	Dropped: 23 Stetson	None	Dropped: 15 Oklahoma; 20 Fresno State; 22 Southern Miss; 25 Creighton	

== Baseball America ==
	Preseason Jan 27	Week 1 Feb 21	Week 2 Feb 28	Week 3 Mar 7	Week 4 Mar 14	Week 5 Mar 21	Week 6 Mar 28	Week 7 Apr 4	Week 8 Apr 11	Week 9 Apr 18	Week 10 Apr 25	Week 11 May 2	Week 12 May 9	Week 13 May 16	Week 14 May 23	Week 15 May 30	Week 16 June 30	
1.	Florida	Florida (3–0)	Florida (7–0)	Florida (10–1)	Florida (14–2)	Florida (18–2)	Vanderbilt (22–3)	Vanderbilt (26–3)	Vanderbilt (30–3)	Virginia (36–3)	Virginia (40–4)	Virginia (42–5)	Virginia (43–5)	Virginia (45–6)	South Carolina (44–12)	Florida (45–16)	South Carolina (55–14)	1.
2.	UCLA	UCLA (3–0)	Vanderbilt (7–1)	Vanderbilt (11–1)	Vanderbilt (16–1)	Vanderbilt (19–2)	Virginia (24–2)	Virginia (28–2)	Virginia (31–3)	South Carolina (28–7)	South Carolina (31–8)	South Carolina (35–8)	Oregon State (34–11)	Oregon State (37–12)	Texas (40–13)	Virginia (49–9)	Florida (53–19)	2.
3.	TCU	Vanderbilt (4–0)	Oklahoma (9–0)	Oklahoma (14–0)	Oklahoma (16–1)	Virginia (19–2)	South Carolina (18–5)	South Carolina (22–5)	South Carolina (26–5)	Oregon State (27–7)	Oregon State (29–8)	Oregon State (32–9)	Vanderbilt (40–6)	South Carolina (41–11)	Florida (41–15)	Vanderbilt (47–10)	Virginia (56–12)	3.
4.	Vanderbilt	TCU (2–1)	South Carolina (6–0)	South Carolina (8–1)	South Carolina (11–2)	South Carolina (14–4)	Florida (21–4)	Florida (24–5)	Florida (26–7)	Vanderbilt (32–5)	Vanderbilt (35–5)	Vanderbilt (38–5)	South Carolina (37–10)	Florida State (39–13)	Vanderbilt (44–9)	South Carolina (45–14)	Vanderbilt (54–12)	4.
5.	Oklahoma	Oklahoma (3–0)	UCLA (5–2)	Texas (7–4)	Texas (11–5)	Texas (15–5)	Arizona State (18–6)	Arizona State (21–6)	Texas A&M (24–8)	Florida (28–9)	Florida (31–10)	Florida (34–10)	Texas (36–12)	Texas (38–12)	Virginia (45–9)	Texas (43–15)	North Carolina (51–16)	5.
6.	Texas	Texas (3–1)	Texas (5–3)	Cal State Fullerton (8–3)	Florida State (15–1)	Arizona State (15–4)	Texas A&M (19–5)	Texas A&M (22–6)	Texas (24–8)	Texas A&M (26–10)	Texas A&M (29–11)	Texas (33–11)	Arizona State (35–11)	Florida (39–13)	Oregon State (38–14)	Florida State (42–17)	Texas (49–19)	6.
7.	South Carolina	South Carolina (3–0)	Cal State Fullerton (4–3)	TCU (7–4)	Virginia (16–1)	Florida State (16–4)	Florida State (18–6)	Florida State (21–7)	North Carolina (29–5)	Texas (27–9)	Texas (30–10)	Arizona State (31–10)	Florida State (36–12)	Vanderbilt (42–8)	Florida State (40–15)	Texas A&M (42–18)	Texas A&M (47–22)	7.
8.	Cal State Fullerton	Stanford (2–1)	TCU (4–3)	Florida State (10–1)	LSU (15–1)	Texas A&M (15–5)	Texas (17–7)	Texas (21–7)	Cal State Fullerton (23–9)	Cal State Fullerton (27–9)	Arizona State (28–9)	Florida State (33–11)	Florida (36–12)	Arizona State (36–13)	Arizona State (38–14)	Cal State Fullerton (40–15)	Florida State (46–19)	8.
9.	Connecticut	Arizona State (3–0)	Stanford (4–3)	Arizona State (9–2)	Arizona State (11–3)	Oklahoma (17–5)	Fresno State (18–2)	Fresno State (20–3)	Oregon State (24–7)	Arizona State (25–9)	Florida State (31–10)	Texas A&M (30–14)	Cal State Fullerton (33–13)	Cal State Fullerton (36–14)	Cal State Fullerton (37–14)	Rice (41–19)	Arizona State (43–18)	9.
10.	Clemson	Florida State (3–0)	Arizona State (6–1)	Clemson (7–2)	TCU (10–5)	Fresno State (14–2)	Oklahoma (18–6)	Oklahoma (22–6)	Arizona State (22–9)	Florida State (26–10)	Cal State Fullerton (28–11)	Cal State Fullerton (30–13)	TCU (33–14)	TCU (36–15)	TCU (40–15)	Arizona State (39–16)	Oregon State (41–19)	10.
11.	Arizona State	Clemson (2–1)	Florida State (7–0)	Virginia (12–1)	Arizona (13–3)	LSU (16–4)	Stanford (10–6)	Stanford (13–7)	Florida State (23–9)	TCU (25–11)	TCU (29–11)	TCU (31–13)	Texas A&M (32–16)	Texas A&M (36–16)	Georgia Tech (39–17)	TCU (42–17)	California (38–23)	11.
12.	Florida State	Cal State Fullerton (1–2)	Clemson (5–1)	Stanford (6–5)	Stanford (6–5)	Stanford (6–5)	Cal State Fullerton (16–8)	Cal State Fullerton (20–8)	TCU (22–10)	Fresno State (25–5)	Georgia Tech (30–11)	Southern Miss (32–11)	Southern Miss (36–11)	Georgia Tech (37–15)	North Carolina (44–12)	Georgia Tech (40–17)	Connecticut (45–20)	12.
13.	Stanford	Virginia (3–0)	Virginia (6–1)	UCLA (7–4)	Cal State Fullerton (8–6)	Cal State Fullerton (11–7)	California (16–5)	California (19–6)	Fresno State (22–5)	Georgia Tech (27–10)	Fresno State (28–7)	Georgia Tech (31–14)	Georgia Tech (33–14)	Oklahoma (39–13)	Texas A&M (38–18)	North Carolina (45–14)	Stanford (35–22)	13.
14.	Oregon	Connecticut (1–2)	California (5–1)	Arizona (9–2)	Baylor (11–5)	TCU (12–7)	Georgia Tech (21–4)	Georgia Tech (23–6)	Oklahoma (24–8)	North Carolina (30–8)	Oklahoma (29–11)	Oklahoma (31–13)	Oklahoma (35–13)	Southern Miss (37–13)	Clemson (39–17)	Clemson (41–18)	Cal State Fullerton (41–17)	14.
15.	Virginia	Oregon (1–2)	Oregon (4–3)	North Carolina (11–1)	California (10–4)	Arizona (15–5)	TCU (15–8)	TCU (18–9)	Georgia Tech (24–9)	California (23–9)	Southern Miss (30–9)	Stetson (34–10)	Stetson (37–10)	Connecticut (36–14)	Connecticut (39–15)	Oregon State (38–17)	Rice (42–21)	15.
16.	Baylor	Baylor (2–1)	Baylor (4–3)	LSU (11–1)	Clemson (7–6)	California (12–5)	North Carolina (23–3)	North Carolina (26–4)	California (20–9)	Oklahoma State (27–9)	Miami (27–13)	Oklahoma State (30–13)	Miami (31–16)	Miami (32–18)	Rice (38–18)	Miami (36–21)	UC Irvine (43–18)	16.
17.	California	California (2–0)	Arizona (5–1)	Baylor (6–5)	Fresno State (3–1)	Georgia Tech (17–4)	LSU (17–7)	LSU (20–8)	Stanford (15–9)	Oklahoma (26–10)	Stetston (31–9)	Miami (29–15)	North Carolina (37–10)	North Carolina (40–12)	Miami (34–20)	UCLA (33–22)	Mississippi State (38–25)	17.
18.	Rice	Arizona (3–0)	College of Charleston (7–0)	Rice (8–5)	North Carolina (14–3)	North Carolina (18–3)	Arizona (17–7)	Southern Miss (22–5)	Troy (25–6)	Stetson (29–7)	North Carolina (32–10)	North Carolina (33–10)	Connecticut (33–13)	Clemson (36–16)	Oklahoma (40–15)	Connecticut (41–17)	Dallas Baptist (42–20)	18.
19.	Arizona	College of Charleston (3–0)	LSU (7–0)	Connecticut (4–4)	Connecticut (7–6)	Clemson (10–7)	Baylor (16–8)	Oregton State (20–7)	Oklahoma State (24–8)	Southern Miss (27–8)	Oklahoma State (28–12)	Fresno State (29–9)	Oklahoma State (31–15)	Rice (35–17)	Southern Miss (38–15)	Arkansas (38–20)	TCU (43–19)	19.
20.	College of Charleston	LSU (3–0)	Texas A&M (6–1)	California (6–4)	College of Charleston (14–3)	Tulane (16–4)	Stetson (20–5)	Troy (22–5)	Arizona (22–11)	UCLA (19–12)	California (24–12)	Connecticut (31–13)	Clemson (32–15)	Fresno State (36–11)	Arkansas (36–18)	FIU (40–18)	Georgia Tech (42–21)	20.
21.	Texas A&M	Texas A&M (3–0)	Rice (5–3)	College of Charleston (10–2)	Texas A&M (12–4)	Baylor (13–7)	Troy (19–4)	Alabama (21–9)	Stetson (25–7)	Arkansas (26–9)	Stanford (19–13)	California (26–14)	Rice (32–16)	Steton (39–13)	Troy (40–16)	Troy (42–17)	Clemson (43–20)	21.
22.	LSU	Rice (1–2)	Connecticut (2–4)	Texas A&M (9–3)	Tulane (11–4)	Auburn (14–6)	Southern Miss (18–5)	Arizona (20–9)	Southern Miss (23–8)	Rice (26–14)	Troy (30–10)	Clemson (29–15)	Fresno State (32–11)	Oklahoma State (33–18)	FIU (37–17)	Oklahoma (41–17)	UCLA (35–24)	22.
23.	St. John's	St. John's (2–1)	North Carolina (6–1)	Fresno State (8–1)	Georgia Tech (12–4)	Oregon State (15–4)	Oregon State (18–6)	Oklahoma State (21–7)	UCLA (16–11)	Arizona (23–13)	Connecticut (26–12)	Gonzaga (25–13)	Arkansas (32–15)	Arkansas (33–17)	UCLA (31–20)	East Carolina (39–19)	Miami (38–23)	23.
24.	Miami	North Carolina (4–0)	Fresno State (6–0)	Tulane (9–3)	UCLA (8–6)	UCLA (8–6)	UCLA (11–8)	UCLA (14–9)	Alabama (21–13)	Gonzaga (21–11)	UCLA (21–14)	Rice (28–16)	UCLA (27–16)	FIU (35–16)	UC Irvine (37–14)	Stanford (32–20)	Arkansas (40–22)	24.
25.	Tulane	Miami (2–1)	UC Irvine (7–0)	Georgia Tech (8–4)	Rice (10–8)	Rice (13–9)	Alabama (18–7)	Stetson (22–7)	Arkansas (23–8)	Miami (24–12)	Rice (28–16)	Texas State (28–16)	Texas State (31–16)	Texas State (34–17)	East Carolina (37–18)	Southern Miss (39–17)	East Carolina (41–21)	25.
	Preseason Jan 27	Week 1 Feb 21	Week 2 Feb 28	Week 3 Mar 7	Week 4 Mar 14	Week 5 Mar 21	Week 6 Mar 28	Week 7 Apr 4	Week 8 Apr 11	Week 9 Apr 18	Week 10 Apr 25	Week 11 May 2	Week 12 May 9	Week 13 May 16	Week 14 May 23	Week 15 May 30	Week 16 June 30	
		Dropped: 25 Tulane	Dropped: 23 St. John's; 25 Miami	Dropped: 15 Oregon; 25 UC Irvine	None	Dropped: 19 Connecticut; 20 College of Charleston	Dropped: 19 Clemson; 20 Tulane; 22 Auburn; 25 Rice	Dropped: 19 Baylor	Dropped: 17 LSU	Dropped: 27 Stanford; 18 Troy; 24 Alabama	Dropped: 21 Arkansas; 23 Arizona; 24 Gonzaga	Dropped: 21 Stanford; 22 Troy; 24 UCLA	Dropped: 21 California; 23 Gonzaga	Dropped: 24 UCLA	Dropped: 20 Fresno State; 21 Stetson; 22 Oklahoma State; Texas State 25	Dropped: 24 UC Irvine	Dropped: 20 FIU; 21 Troy; 22 Oklahoma; 25 Southern Miss	

== Collegiate Baseball ==
	Preseason Dec 20	Week 1 Feb 21	Week 2 Feb 28	Week 3 Mar 7	Week 4 Mar 14	Week 5 Mar 21	Week 6 Mar 28	Week 7 Apr 4	Week 8 Apr 11	Week 9 Apr 18	Week 10 Apr 25	Week 11 May 2	Week 12 May 9	Week 13 May 16	Week 14 May 23	Week 15 May 30	Week 16 June 7	Week 17 June 13	Week 18 June 30	
1.	TCU	Florida (3–0)	Florida (7–0)	Florida (10–1)	Florida (14–2)	Florida (18–2)	Virginia (24–2)	Virginia (28–2)	Virginia (31–3)	Virginia (36–3)	Virginia (40–4)	South Carolina (35–8)	Virginia (43–5)	Virginia (45–6)	South Carolina (44–12)	Florida (45–160	Florida (48–16)	Florida (50–17)	South Carolina (55–14)	1.
2.	Florida	UCLA (3–0)	Oklahoma (9–0)	Oklahoma (14–0)	Oklahoma (16–1)	Vanderbilt (19–2)	Vanderbilt (22–3)	Vanderbilt (26–3)	Vanderbilt (30–3)	South Carolina (28–7)	South Carolina (31–8)	Virginia (42–5)	Vanderbilt (40–6)	Oregon State (37–12)	Florida (41–15)	Virginia (49–9)	Virginia (52–9)	Virginia (54–10)	Florida (53–19)	2.
3.	UCLA	TCU (2–1)	Vanderbilt (7–1)	Vanderbilt (11–1)	Vanderbilt (16–1)	Virginia (19–2)	South Carolina (18–5)	South Carolina (22–5)	South Carolina (26–5)	Vanderbilt (32–5)	Vanderbilt (35–5)	Vanderbilt (38–5)	Oregon State (34–11)	South Carolina (41–11)	Vanderbilt (44–9)	Vanderbilt (47–10)	Vanderbilt (50–10)	Vanderbilt (52–10)	Virginia (56–12)	3.
4.	Clemson	Vanderbilt (4–0)	Clemson (5–1)	Clemson (7–2)	Florida State (15–1)	Texas (15–5)	Florida (21–4)	Florida (24–5)	Texas (24–8)	Texas (27–9)	Texas (30–10)	Oregon State (32–9)	South Carolina (37–10)	Florida (39–11)	Texas (40–13)	South Carolina (45–14)	South Carolina (48–14)	South Carolina (50–14)	Vanderbilt (54–12)	4.
5.	Vanderbilt	Oklahoma (4–0)	Florida State (7–0)	Florida State (10–1)	LSU (15–1)	Arizona State (15–4)	Texas A&M (19–5)	Arizona State (21–6)	Florida (26–7)	Cal State Fullerton (27–9)	Florida (31–10)	Florida (34–10)	Florida (36–12)	Vanderbilt (42–8)	Virginia (45–9)	Texas (43–15)	Texas (47–16)	Texas (49–17)	North Carolina (51–16)	5.
6.	Oklahoma	Clemson (2–1)	South Carolina (6–0)	South Carolina (8–1)	Virginia (16–1)	Texas A&M (15–5)	Georgia Tech (21–4)	Texas (21–7)	North Carolina (29–5)	Florida (28–9)	Oregon State (29–8)	Texas (33–11)	Texas (36–12)	Texas (38–12)	Oregon State (38–14)	Texas A&M (42–18)	Texas A&M (45–19)	Texas A&M (47–20)	California (38–23)	6.
7.	Texas	Texas (3–1)	LSU (7–0)	LSU (11–1)	South Carolina (11–2)	South Carolina (14–4)	Arizona State (18–6)	Texas A&M (22–6)	Cal State Fullerton (23–9)	Oregon State (27–7)	TCU (29–11)	Arizona State (31–10)	Arizona State (35–11)	TCU (36–15)	TCU (40–15)	TCU (42–17)	North Carolina (48–14)	North Carolina (50–14)	Texas (49–19)	7.
8.	Texas A&M	Texas A&M (3–0)	UCLA (5–2)	Cal State Fullerton (8–3)	Texas (11–5)	Florida State (16–4)	Texas (17–7)	Georgia Tech (23–6)	Texas A&M (24–8)	Texas A&M (26–10)	Texas A&M (29–11)	TCU (31–13)	TCU (33–14)	Georgia Tech (37–15)	Georgia Tech (39–17)	Cal State Fullerton (40–15)	Florida State (45–17)	California (37–21)	Texas A&M (47–22)	8.
9.	Oregon	Stanford (2–1)	Texas A&M (6–1)	TCU (7–4)	TCU (10–5)	LSU (16–4)	Fresno State (18–2)	North Carolina (26–4)	Georgia Tech (24–9)	Georgia Tech (27–10)	Georgia Tech (30–11)	Texas A&M (30–14)	Georgia Tech (33–14)	Florida State (39–13)	North Carolina (44–12)	Georgia Tech (40–19)	Oregon State (41–17)	Florida State (46–19)	Florida State (46–19)	9.
10.	Stanford	Arizona State (3–0)	TCU (4–3)	Virginia (12–1)	Arizona State (11–3)	Oklahoma (17–5)	Cal State Fullerton (16–8)	Cal State Fullerton (20–8)	Oregon State (24–7)	TCU (25–11)	Arizona State (28–9)	Georgia Tech (31–14)	Florida State (36–12)	Cal State Fullerton (36–14)	Cal State Fullerton (37–14)	North Carolina (45–14)	Arizona State (42–16)	Oregon State (41–19)	Oregon State (41–19)	10.
11.	Arizona State	Florida State (3–0)	Arizona State (6–1)	Texas (7–4)	Texas A&M (12–4)	UC Irvine (14–2)	North Carolina (23–3)	Fresno State (20–3)	TCU (22–10)	UCLA (19–12)	Cal State Fullerton (28–11)	Florida State (33–11)	Cal State Fullerton (33–13)	Texas A&M (36–16)	Arizona State (38–14)	Florida State (42–17)	Connecticut (45–18–1)	Arizona State (43–18)	Arizona State (43–18)	11.
12.	Cal State Fullerton	South Carolina (3–0)	Texas (5–3)	UCLA (7–4)	Arizona (13–3)	Georgia Tech (17–4)	Florida State (18–6)	Florida State (21–7)	UCLA (16–11)	Arizona State (25–9)	Florida State (31–10)	Cal State Fullerton (30–13)	Texas A&M (32–16)	Oklahoma (39–13)	Florida State (40–12)	UCLA (33–12)	UC Irvine (42–16)	UC Irvine (43–18)	UC Irvine (43–18)	12.
13.	Florida State	LSU (3–0)	Cal State Fullerton (4–3)	Arizona State (9–2)	Arkansas (13–2)	TCU (12–7)	Oklahoma (19–6)	Oklahoma (22–6)	Arizona State (22–9)	Fresno State (25–5)	UCLA (21–14)	UCLA (23–16)	UCLA (27–16)	Arizona State (36–13)	Texas A&M (38–18)	Oregon State (38–17)	Stanford (35–20)	Connecticut (45–20–1)	Connecticut (45–20–1)	13.
14.	South Carolina	Virginia (3–0)	Stanford (4–3)	Texas A&M (9–3)	UC Irvine (12–1)	UCLA (8–6)	TCU (15–8)	Southern Miss (22–5)	Fresno State (22–5)	North Carolina (30–8)	Miami (27–13)	Miami (29–15)	Oklahoma (35–13)	Connecticut (36–14–1)	Oklahoma (40–15)	Arizona State (39–16)	California (35–21)	Stanford (35–22)	Stanford (35–22)	14.
15.	LSU	Oregon (1–2)	Virginia (6–1)	Arizona (9–2)	UCLA (8–6)	Clemson (10–7)	UCLA (11–8)	TCU (18–9)	Florida State (23–9)	Oklahoma State (27–9)	Oklahoma (29–11)	Oklahoma (31–13)	Connecticut (33–13–1)	Miami (32–18)	Connecticut (39–15–1)	Oklahoma (41–17)	Dallas Baptist (42–18)	Mississippi State (38–25)	Mississippi State (38–25)	15.
16.	Connecticut	Louisville (3–0)	Arizona (5–1)	North Carolina (11–1)	Clemson (7–6)	Cal State Fullerton (11–7)	Clemson (13–9)	UCLA (14–9)	Oklahoma (24–8)	Oklahoma (26–10)	Fresno State (28–7)	Connecticut (31–13–1)	Miami (31–16)	North Carolina (40–12)	Miami (34–20)	Connecticut (41–17–1)	Mississippi State (37–23)	Dallas Baptist (42–20)	Dallas Baptist (42–20)	16.
17.	Virginia	Arizona (3–0)	North Carolina (6–1)	Stanford (6–5)	Cal State Fullerton (8–6)	Arizona (15–5)	Arizona (17–7)	California (19–6)	Arkansas (23–8)	Arkansas (26–9)	North Carolina (32–10)	North Carolina (33–10)	North Carolina (37–10)	UCLA (29–19)	UCLA (31–20)	Rice (41–19)	TCU (43–19)	TCU (43–19)	TCU (43–19)	17.
18.	Miami	North Carolina (4–0)	Oregon (4–3)	Arkansas (10–1)	Stanford (6–5)	Stanford (6–5)	Stanford (10–6)	Stanford (13–7)	Oklahoma State (24–8)	Florida State (26–10)	Connecticut (26–12–1)	Fresno State (29–9)	Southern Miss (36–11)	Clemson (36–16)	Clemson (39–17)	Miami (36–21)	Cal State Fullerton (41–17)	Cal State Fullerton (41–17)	Cal State Fullerton (41–17)	18.
19.	Georgia Tech	Cal State Fullerton (1–2)	Wichita State (7–0)	Wichita State (9–2)	North Carolina (14–3)	North Carolina (18–3)	California (16–5)	Alabama (21–9)	Miami (21–11)	California (23–9)	Southern Miss (30–9)	Oklahoma State (30–13)	Stetson (37–10)	UC Irvine (34–13)	UC Irvine (37–14)	Clemson (41–18)	Georgia Tech (42–21)	Georgia Tech (42–21)	Georgia Tech (42–21)	19.
20.	Louisville	Miami (2–1)	Arkansas (6–0)	Fresno State (8–1)	Fresno State (11–2)	Fresno State (14–2)	Southern Miss (18–5)	Oregon State (20–7)	California (20–9)	Miami (24–12)	UC Irvine (26–10)	Southern Miss (32–11)	Clemson (32–15)	Fresno State (26–11)	Rice (38–18)	UC Irvine (39–16)	UCLA (35–24)	UCLA (35–24)	UCLA (35–24)	20.
21.	Rice	Georgia Tech (2–1)	Fresno State (6–0)	UC Irvine (8–1)	Louisville (11–3)	Auburn (14–6)	Alabama (18–7)	Arizona (20–9)	Stanford (15–9)	Stetson (29–7)	Oklahoma State (28–12)	Clemson (29–15)	Oklahoma State (31–15)	Southern Miss (37–13)	Southern Miss (38–15)	Coastal Carolina (41–18)	Clemson (43–20)	Clemson (43–20)	Clemson (43–20)	21.
22.	Arizona	Rice (1–2)	UC Irvine (7–0)	Louisville (8–2)	Georgia Tech (12–4)	Arkansas (15–4)	Arkansas (18–6)	Troy (22–5)	Arizona (22–11)	Southern Miss (27–8)	Arkansas (28–11)	Stetson (34–10)	UC Irvine (31–13)	Stetson (39–13)	Arkansas (36–18)	Arizona (36–19)	Miami (38–23)	Miami (38–23)	Miami (38–23)	22.
23.	Wichita State	Wichita State (3–0)	Rice (5–3)	Rice (8–5)	Oregon State (13–3)	Tulane (16–4)	UCF (18–6)	Rice (21–11)	Troy (25–6)	Arizona (23–13)	Stetson (31–9)	UC Irvine (28–12)	Fresno State (32–11)	Oklahoma State (33–18)	California (30–18)	Stanford (32–20)	Oral Roberts (39–22)	Oral Roberts (39–22)	Oral Roberts (39–22)	23.
24.	Coastal Carolina	Coastal Carolina (3–1)	Miami (4–3)	Georgia Tech (8–4)	Auburn (11–5)	Wichita State (13–6)	Mississippi State (18–6)	Gonzaga (16–8–1)	Gonzaga (19–9–1)	UC Irvine (23–9)	California (24–12)	California (26–14)	Coastal Carolina (33–15)	Rice (35–17)	Coastal Carolina (37–18)	Kent State (43–15)	Rice (42–21)	Rice (42–11)	Rice (42–21)	24.
25.	Auburn	Connecticut (1–2)	Louisville (4–2)	Auburn (9–3)	Tulane (11–4)	Southern Miss (15–3)	LSU (17–7)	Arkansas (19–8)	Southern Miss (23–8)	Rice (26–14)	Clemson (25–14)	Charlotte (34–10)	California (28–16)	California (28–16)	Kent State (39–14)	Creighton (44–14)	Arizona (39–21)	Arizona (39–21)	Arizona (39–21)	25.
26.	St. John's	Auburn (2–1)	Georgia Tech (5–3)	Stetson (9–1)	Wichita State (10–4)	Oregon State (15–4)	UC Irvine (14–6)	LSU (20–8)	Rice (23–13)	Connecticut (21–12–1)	Charlotte (31–9)	Arizona (27–16)	Arizona (30–16)	Coastal Carolina (34–17)	Stanford (30–19)	Arkansas (38–20)	Kent State (45–17)	Kent State (45–17)	Kent State (45–17)	26.
27.	North Carolina	Arkansas	Auburn (5–2)	James Madison (11–1)	Baylor (11–5)	California (12–5)	Tulane (18–6)	UC Irvine (18–6)	Connecticut (17–11–1)	Coastal Carolina (24–12)	Stanford (19–13)	Arkansas (29–13)	Rice (32–16)	Arizona (31–17)	Fresno State (37–14)	Fresno State (40–14)	Coastal Carolina (42–20)	Coastal Carolina (42–20)	Coastal Carolina (42–20)	27.
28.	San Diego	Fresno State (2–0)	Ole Miss (7–1)	Tulane (9–3)	College of Charleston (14–3)	Stetson (16–4)	Wichita State (17–8)	New Mexico State (22–6)	Georgia (18–15)	Creighton (26–7)	Rice (28–16)	Kent State (30–12)	Arkansas (32–15)	Kent State (36–13)	St. John's (32–18)	James Madison (40–17)	Creighton (45–16)	Creighton (45–16)	Creighton (45–16)	28.
29.	Fresno State	St. John's (2–1)	California (5–1)	Nebraska (8–4)	California (10–4)	Miami (12–8)	Oregon State (18–6)	Connecticut (14–10–1)	Stetson (25–7)	Gonzaga (21–11–1)	Kent State (26–12)	Rice (28–16)	Charlotte (36–11)	Charlotte (38–12)	Troy (40–16)	Southern Miss (39–17)	Arkansas (40–22)	Arkansas (40–22)	Arkansas (40–22)	29.
30.	Pittsburgh	UC Irvine (3–0)т; Hawaii (2–1)т	San Jose State (6–1)	Cal State Bakersfield (11–2)	Stetson (12–3)	Oregon (11–7)	Stetson (20–5)	Georgia (14–14)	Charlotte (26–6)	Charlotte (28–8)	St. John's (21–13)	Coastal Carolina (30–15)	Kent State (32–13)	Arkansas (33–17)	James Madison (37–17)	California (31–20)	Stetson (43–20)	Stetson (43–20)	Stetson (43–20)	30.
	Preseason Dec 20	Week 1 Feb 21	Week 2 Feb 28	Week 3 Mar 7	Week 4 Mar 14	Week 5 Mar 21	Week 6 Mar 28	Week 7 Apr 4	Week 8 Apr 11	Week 9 Apr 18	Week 10 Apr 25	Week 11 May 2	Week 12 May 9	Week 13 May 16	Week 14 May 23	Week 15 May 30	Week 16 June 7	Week 17 June 13	Week 18 June 30	
		Dropped: 28 San Diego; 30 Pittsburgh	Dropped: 24 Coastal Carolina; 25 Connecticut; 29 St. John's; 30 Hawaii	Dropped: 18 Oregon; 24 Miami; 28 Ole Miss; 29 California; 30 San Jose State	Dropped: 23 Rice; 27 James Madison; 29 Nebraska; 30 Cal State Bakersfield	Dropped: 21 Louisville; 27 Baylor; 28 College of Charleston	Dropped: 21 Auburn; 29 Miami; 30 Oregon	Dropped: 16 Clemson; 23 UCF; 24 Mississippi State; 27 Tulane; 28 Wichita State; 30 Stetson	Dropped: 19 Alabama; 26 LSU; 27 UC Irvine; 28 New Mexico State	Dropped: 21 Stanford; 23 Troy; 28 Georgia	Dropped: 23 Arizona; 27 Coastal Carolina; 28 Creighton; 29 Gonzaga	Dropped: 27 Stanford; 30 St. John's	None	None	Dropped: 23 Oklahoma State; 24 Rice; 27 Arizona; 29 Charlotte	Dropped: 28 St. John's; 29 Troy	Dropped: 15 Oklahoma; 27 Fresno State; 28 James Madison; 29 Southern Miss	None	None	

== NCBWA ==
	Preseason Jan 31	Week 1 Feb 21	Week 2 Feb 28	Week 3 Mar 7	Week 4 Mar 14	Week 5 Mar 21	Week 6 Mar 28	Week 7 Apr 4	Week 8 Apr 11	Week 9 Apr 18	Week 10 Apr 25	Week 11 May 2	Week 12 May 9	Week 13 May 16	Week 14 May 23	Week 15 May 30	Week 16 June 14	Week 17 June 30	
1.	TCU	UCLA (3–0)	Florida (7–0)	Florida (10–1)	Vanderbilt (16–1)	Florida (18–2)	Vanderbilt (22–3)	Vanderbilt (26–3)	Vanderbilt (30–3)	Virginia (36–3)	Virginia (40–4)	Vanderbilt (38–5)	Vanderbilt (40–6)	Virginia (45–6)	South Carolina (44–12)	Virginia (49–9)	Virginia (54–10)	South Carolina (55–14)	1.
2.	UCLA	Florida (3–0)	Vanderbilt (7–1)	Vanderbilt (11–1)	Florida (14–2)	Vanderbilt (19–2)	Virginia (24–2)	Virginia (28–2)	Virginia (31–3)	South Carolina (28–7)	Vanderbilt (35–5)	South Carolina (35–8)	Virginia (43–5)	South Carolina (41–11)	Vanderbilt (44–9)	Vanderbilt (47–10)	Vanderbilt (52–10)	Florida (53–19)	2.
3.	Florida	Vanderbilt (4–0)	Oklahoma (9–0)	Oklahoma (14–0)	Oklahoma (16–1)	Virginia (19–2)	South Carolina (18–5)	South Carolina (22–5)	South Carolina (26–5)	Vanderbilt (32–5)	South Carolina (31–8)	Virginia (42–5)	South Carolina (37–10)	Vanderbilt (42–8)	Texas (40–13)	Florida (45–16)	Florida (50–17)	Virginia (56–12)	3.
4.	Vanderbilt	Oklahoma (4–0)	South Carolina (6–0)	South Carolina (8–1)	Florida State (15–1)	Arizona State (15–4)	Florida (21–4)	Florida (24–5)	Florida (26–7)	Texas (27–9)	Texas (30–10)	Florida (34–10)	Texas (36–12)	Texas (38–12)	Virginia (45–9)	South Carolina (45–14)	South Carolina (50–14)	Vanderbilt (54–12)	4.
5.	Oklahoma	TCU (2–1)	Florida State (7–0)	Florida State (10–1)	Virginia (16–1)	Texas (15–5)	Arizona State (18–6)	Arizona State (21–6)	Texas (24–8)	Florida (28–9)	Florida (31–10)	Texas (33–11)	Arizona State (35–11)	Florida (39–13)	Florida (41–15)	Texas (43–15)	Texas (49–17)	North Carolina (51–16)	5.
6.	Texas	South Carolina (3–0)	UCLA (5–2)	Virginia (12–1)	South Carolina (11–2)	South Carolina (14–4)	Texas A&M (19–5)	Texas A&M (22–6)	North Carolina (29–5)	Arizona State (25–9)	Arizona State (28–9)	Arizona State (31–10)	Florida (36–12)	Florida State (39–13)	Arizona State (38–14)	TCU (42–17)	North Carolina (50–14)	California (38–23)	6.
7.	Clemson	Texas (3–1)	Arizona State (6–1)	Arizona State (9–2)	LSU (15–1)	Florida State (16–4)	Oklahoma (19–6)	Oklahoma (22–6)	Texas A&M (24–8)	TCU (25–11)	TCU (29–11)	Florida State (33–10)	Florida State (36–12)	Oklahoma (39–13)	TCU (40–15)	Florida State (42–17)	Texas A&M (47–20)	Texas (49–19)	7.
8.	South Carolina	Florida State (3–0)	Virginia (6–1)	Clemson (7–2)	Arizona State (11–3)	Oklahoma (17–5)	Texas (17–7)	Texas (21–7)	Oklahoma (24–8)	Cal State Fullerton (27–9)	Texas A&M (29–11)	Oregon State (32–9)	Oklahoma (35–13)	Arizona State (36–13)	North Carolina (44–12)	Texas A&M (42–18)	Arizona State (43–18)	Texas A&M (47–22)	8.
9.	Cal State Fullerton	Arizona State (3–0)	Clemson (5–1)	TCU (7–4)	TCU (10–5)	Texas A&M (15–5)	Florida State (18–6)	Florida State (21–7)	TCU (22–10)	Texas A&M (26–10)	Florida State (31–10)	TCU (31–13)	TCU (33–14)	TCU (36–15)	Florida State (40–15)	Clemson (41–18)	Florida State (46–19)	Arizona State (43–18)	9.
10.	Florida State	Virginia (3–0)	TCU (4–3)	LSU (11–1)	Texas (11–5)	LSU (16–4)	North Carolina (23–3)	North Carolina (26–4)	Arizona State (22–9)	Florida State (26–10)	Oklahoma (29–11)	Oklahoma (31–13)	Oregon State (34–11)	Oregon State (37–12)	Clemson (39–17)	North Carolina (45–14)	UC Irvine (43–18)	Florida State (46–19)	10.
11.	Arizona State	Clemson (2–1)	LSU (7–0)	UCLA (7–4)	Arkansas (13–2)	TCU (12–7)	TCU (15–8)	TCU (18–9)	Cal State Fullerton (23–9)	Oklahoma (26–10)	Cal State Fullerton (28–11)	Texas A&M (30–14)	North Carolina (37–10)	Cal State Fullerton (36–14)	Cal State Fullerton (37–14)	Cal State Fullerton (40–15)	California (37–21)	UC Irvine (43–18)	11.
12.	Oregon	Stanford (2–1)	Texas (5–3)	Texas (7–4)	Texas A&M (12–4)	Arkansas (15–4)	Georgia Tech (21–4)	Cal State Fullerton (20–8)	Florida State (23–9)	Arkansas (26–9)	Oregon State (29–8)	Cal State Fullerton (30–13)	Cal State Fullerton (33–13)	Clemson (36–16)	Oklahoma (40–15)	Arizona State (39–16)	Oregon State (41–19)	Oregon State (41–19)	12.
13.	Virginia	Texas A&M (3–0)	Texas A&M (6–1)	Cal State Fullerton (8–3)	Arizona (13–3)	North Carolina (18–3)	Arkansas (18–6)	Fresno State (20–3)	Arkansas (23–8)	North Carolina (30–8)	Georgia Tech (30–11)	North Carolina (33–10)	Clemson (32–15)	Texas A&M (36–16)	Oregon State (38–14)	Rice (41–19)	Stanford (35–22)	Stanford (35–22)	13.
14.	Stanford	LSU (3–0)	Cal State Fullerton (4–3)	North Carolina (11–1)	Clemson (7–6)	Clemson (10–7)	Cal State Fullerton (16–8)	Georgia Tech (23–6)	Fresno State (22–5)	Fresno State (25–5)	Arkansas (28–11)	Clemson (29–15)	Texas A&M (32–16)	North Carolina (40–12)	Texas A&M (38–18)	Oklahoma (41–17)	Connecticut (45–20–1)	Connecticut (45–20–1)	14.
15.	Rice	Cal State Fullerton (1–2)	Stanford (4–3)	Arkansas (10–1)	UC Irvine (12–1)	UC Irvine (14–2)	Fresno State (18–2)	LSU (20–8)	Georgia Tech (24–9)	Oregon State (27–7)	North Carolina (32–10)	Georgia Tech (31–14)	Georgia Tech (33–14)	Georgia Tech (37–15)	Rice (38–18)	UC Irvine (39–16)	Clemson (43–20)	Clemson (43–20)	15.
16.	Texas A&M	Louisville (3–0)	Arkansas (6–0)	Texas A&M (9–3)	UCLA (8–6)	Arizona (15–5)	LSU (17–7)	Stanford (13–7)	Stanford (15–9)	Georgia Tech (27–10)	Fresno State (28–7)	Arkansas (29–13)	Arkansas (32–15)	UC Irvine (34–13)	UC Irvine (37–14)	Arkansas (38–20)	Cal State Fullerton (41–17)	Cal State Fullerton (41–17)	16.
17.	Connecticut	Coastal Carolina (3–1)	Rice (5–3)	Stanford (6–5)	North Carolina (14–3)	Georgia Tech (17–4)	Clemson (13–9)	UCLA (14–9)	Oregon State (24–7)	UCLA (19–12)	UC Irvine (26–10)	UC Irvine (28–12)	Southern Miss (36–11)	Rice (35–17)	Georgia Tech (39–17)	UCLA (33–22)	TCU (43–19)	TCU (43–19)	17.
18.	Coastal Carolina	Rice (1–2)	North Carolina (6–1)	Arizona (9–2)	Stanford (6–5)	UCLA (8–6)	Arizona (17–7)	Arkansas (19–8)	UCLA (16–11)	UC Irvine (23–9)	Clemson (25–14)	Fresno State (29–9)	UC Irvine (31–13)	Arkansas (33–17)	Arkansas (36–18)	Oregon State (38–17)	Rice (42–21)	Rice (42–21)	18.
19.	LSU	Oregon (1–2)	College of Charleston (7–0)	Rice (8–5)	Louisville (11–3)	Cal State Fullerton (11–7)	Stanford (10–6)	UC Irvine (18–6)	UC Irvine (20–8)	Rice (26–14)	UCLA (21–14)	Southern Miss (32–11)	Rice (32–16)	Fresno State (36–11)	UCLA (31–20)	Georgia Tech (40–19)	Mississippi State (38–25)	Mississippi State (38–25)	19.
20.	Miami	Arkansas (3–0)	Oregon (4–3)	Louisville (8–2)	Cal State Fullerton (8–6)	Stanford (6–5)	UCLA (11–8)	California (19–6)	Arizona (22–11)	Oklahoma State (27–9)	Southern Miss (30–9)	UCLA (23–16)	UCLA (27–16)	Southern Miss (37–13)	Stanford (30–19)	Stanford (32–20)	Arkansas (40–22)	Arkansas (40–22)	20.
21.	Georgia Tech	North Carolina (4–0)	UC Irvine (7–0)	UC Irvine (8–1)	College of Charleston (14–3)	Fresno State (14–2)	California (16–5)	Arizona (20–9)	LSU (21–11)	Clemson (22–13)	Stanford (19–13)	Rice (28–16)	Fresno State (32–11)	UCLA (29–19)	Southern Miss (38–15)	Fresno State (40–14)	Dallas Baptist (42–20)	Dallas Baptist (42–20)	21.
22.	Louisville	Miami (2–1)	Arizona (5–1)	College of Charleston (10–2)	Georgia Tech (12–4)	Auburn (14–6)	UC Irvine (14–6)	Rice (21–11)	Rice (23–13)	California (23–9)	Rice (28–16)	Oklahoma State (30–13)	Stanford (25–16)	Stanford (28–18)	Connecticut (39–15–1)	Miami (36–21)	UCLA (35–24)	UCLA (35–24)	22.
23.	Auburn	Arizona (3–0)	Louisville (4–2)	Auburn (9–3)	Coastal Carolina (11–5)	Rice (13–9)	Louisville (15–8)	Southern Miss (22–5)	Clemson (18–13)	Stanford (16–12)	Miami (27–13)	Miami (29–15)	Stetson (37–10)	Miami (32–18)	Miami (34–20)	Arizona (36–19)	Georgia Tech (42–21)	Georgia Tech (42–21)	23.
24.	Arkansas	Georgia Tech (2–1)	California (5–1)	Coastal Carolina (7–4)	Rice (10–8)	Oregon (11–7)	Alabama (18–7)	Alabama (21–9)	California (20–9)	Southern Miss (27–8)	Oklahoma State (28–12)	Stanford (21–16)	Miami (31–16)	Connecticut (36–14–1)	Fresno State (37–14)	Southern Miss (39–17)	Oklahoma (41–19)	Oklahoma (41–19)	24.
25.	Arizona	College of Charleston (3–0)	Auburn (5–2)	Georgia Tech (8–4)	Fresno State (11–2)	California (12–5)	Rice (16–11)	Louisville (18–9)	Charlotte (26–6)	Arizona (23–13)	Charlotte (31–9)	Charlotte (34–10)	Oklahoma State (31–15)	Charlotte (38–12)	East Carolina (37–18)	Connecticut (41–17–1)	Arizona (39–21)	Arizona (39–21)	25.
26.	College of Charleston	UC Irvine (3–0)	Miami (4–3)	Fresno State (8–1)	Auburn (11–5)	Oregon State (15–4)	Oregon (14–9)	Clemson (14–12)	Oklahoma State (24–8)	Stetson (29–7)	California (24–12)	Stetson (34–10)	Arizona (30–16)	Arizona (31–17)	Arizona (33–19)	Creighton (44–14)	Miami (38–23)	Miami (38–23)	26.
27.	UC Irvine	Auburn (2–1)	Coastal Carolina (4–4)	Oregon (5–6)	California (10–4)	Louisville (12–7)	Oregon State (18–6)	Oregon State (20–7)	Troy (25–6)	LSU (23–14)	Stetson (31–9)	Arizona (27–16)	Charlotte (36–11)	Stetson (39–13)	Creighton (39–13)	East Carolina (39–19)	Kent State (45–17)	Kent State (45–17)	27.
28.	Alabama	Connecticut (1–2)	Georgia Tech (5–3)	Wichita State (9–2)	Oregon (8–7)	College of Charleston (15–6)	Southern Miss (18–5)	Charlotte (23–6)	Louisville (20–11)	Charlotte (28–8)	Arizona (24–15)	California (26–14)	Coastal Carolina (33–15)	Oklahoma State (33–18)	Charlotte (39–14)	Charlotte (42–14)	Fresno State (40–16)	Fresno State (40–16)	28.
29.	North Carolina	Alabama (3–0)	Fresno State (6–0)	California (6–4)	Baylor (11–5)	Coastal Carolina (13–8)	Stetson (20–5)	Troy (22–5)	Southern Miss (23–8)	Creighton (26–7)	East Carolina (27–13)	Coastal Carolina (30–15)	Connecticut (33–13–1)	California (28–16)	California (30–18)	Coastal Carolina (41–18)	East Carolina (41–21)	East Carolina (41–21)	29.
30.	California	California (2–0)	Wichita State (7–0)	James Madison (11–1)	Oregon State (13–3)	Southern Miss (15–3)	Auburn (14–10)	Oklahoma State (21–7)	Stetson (25–7)	Miami (24–12)	Troy (30–10)	Connecticut (31–13–1)	California (28–16)	East Carolina (34–17)	Troy (40–16)	Kent State (43–15)	Southern Miss (39–19)	Southern Miss (39–19)	30.
	Preseason Jan 31	Week 1 Feb 21	Week 2 Feb 28	Week 3 Mar 7	Week 4 Mar 14	Week 5 Mar 21	Week 6 Mar 28	Week 7 Apr 4	Week 8 Apr 11	Week 9 Apr 18	Week 10 Apr 25	Week 11 May 2	Week 12 May 9	Week 13 May 16	Week 14 May 23	Week 15 May 30	Week 16 June 14	Week 17 June 30	
		None	Dropped: 28 Connecticut; 29 Alabama	Dropped: 26 Miami	Dropped: 28 Wichita State; 30 James Madison	Dropped: 29 Baylor	Dropped: 28 College of Charleston; 29 Coastal Carolina	Dropped: 26 Oregon; 29 Stetson; 30 Auburn	Dropped: 24 Alabama	Dropped: 27 Troy; 28 Louisville	Dropped: 27 LSU; 29 Creighton	Dropped: 29 East Carolina; 30 Troy	None	Dropped: 28 Coastal Carolina	Dropped: 27 Stetson; 28 Oklahoma State	Dropped: 29 California; 30 Troy	Dropped: 26 Creighton; 28 Charlotte; 29 Coastal Carolina	None	
