= 2011 Oregon State Beavers baseball team =

American college baseball season

2011 Oregon State Beavers baseball

Corvallis Regional champions

Nashville Super Regional, 0–2
- Conference: Pacific-10 Conference

Ranking
- Coaches: No. 11
- CB: No. 10
- Record: 41–19 (17–10 Pac-10)
- Head coach: Pat Casey (17th season)
- Assistant coaches: Marty Lees (10th season); Pat Bailey (4th season)
- Home stadium: Goss Stadium at Coleman Field

2011 Pacific-10 Conference baseball standings
	Conf.				Overall
Team	W		L	PCT	W		L	PCT
No. 18 UCLA ‍†‍‍^{y}	18	–	9	.667	35	–	24	.593
No. 11 Arizona State ‍‍‍^{y}	17	–	10	.630	42	–	16	.724
No. 16 Oregon State ‍‍‍^{y}	17	–	10	.630	41	–	17	.707
Arizona ‍‍‍^{y}	15	–	12	.556	39	–	21	.650
No. 21 Stanford ‍‍‍^{y}	14	–	12	.538	35	–	20	.636
California ‍‍‍^{y}	13	–	13	.500	35	–	21	.625
USC ‍‍‍	13	–	14	.481	25	–	31	.446
Oregon ‍‍‍	11	–	16	.407	33	–	26	.559
Washington State ‍‍‍	10	–	17	.370	26	–	28	.481
Washington ‍‍‍	6	–	21	.222	17	–	37	.315
† – Conference champion ‡ – Pac-10 Conference champion y – Invited to the 2011 NCAA Division I baseball tournament As of June 8, 2011; Rankings from Coaches' Poll

The 2011 Oregon State Beavers baseball team represented Oregon State University in the 2011 NCAA Division I baseball season. The team participated in the Pacific-10 Conference. They were coached by Pat Casey and assistant coaches Marty Lees, Pat Bailey, and Nate Yeskie. They played their home games in Goss Stadium at Coleman Field. The Beavers finished the season with a 41–19 overall record, and came in third in the Pacific-10 Conference Championship with 17 wins and 10 losses.

The team was selected to host a Regional in the 2011 NCAA Division I baseball tournament, and as such were seeded #1 in the Corvallis Regional. The Beavers won all three of their games in the Corvallis Regional and went on to play the #6 national seed Vanderbilt in the Nashville Super Regional, where they lost in 2 games.

== Previous season ==
Oregon State finished the 2010 regular season as the #8 team in the Pacific-10 Conference, and lost to the Florida Gators in the Gainesville Regional. Many players returned from last year's team to play for the 2011 team.

== Highlights ==
- The pitching staff finished the season with a team ERA of 3.14 in 2011, which is the lowest since 2005 and the second-lowest since 1979.
- Six pitchers were selected in the first nine rounds of the Major League Baseball First-Year Player Draft, the most ever in Beavers' history.

== Schedule ==
2005 Oregon State Beavers baseball game log (41–19)
Regular season (38–17)
February (5–3)

#	Date	Opponent	Rank	Site/stadium	Score	Overall record	Pac-10 record
1	February 19	vs. Gonzaga		Pete Beiden Field • Fresno, California	W 4–3 (11)	1–0	–
2	February 20	vs. Gonzaga		Pete Beiden Field • Fresno, California	W 4–2	2–0	–
3	February 20	at No. 29 Fresno State		Pete Beiden Field • Fresno, California	L 1–2	2–1	–
4	February 21	at No. 29 Fresno State		Pete Beiden Field • Fresno, California	L 4–5	2–2	–
Kleberg Bank Classic
5	February 25	vs. No. 25 Connecticut		Whataburger Field • Corpus Christi, Texas	W 2–0	3–2	–
6	February 26	vs. Texas A&M–Corpus Christi		Whataburger Field • Corpus Christi, Texas	L 7–8	3–3	–
7	February 27	vs. Indiana		Whataburger Field • Corpus Christi, Texas	W 7–5	4–3	–
8	February 28	vs. UTSA		Wolff Municipal Stadium • San Antonio, Texas	W 10–7 (10)	5–3	–

March (13–3)

#	Date	Opponent	Rank	Site/stadium	Score	Overall record	Pac-10 record
9	March 5	Hartford		Goss Stadium at Coleman Field • Corvallis, Oregon	W 14–3 (7)	6–3	–
10	March 5	Hartford		Goss Stadium at Coleman Field • Corvallis, Oregon	W 16–1	7–3	–
11	March 6	Hartford		Goss Stadium at Coleman Field • Corvallis, Oregon	W 9–1	8–3	–
12	March 6	Hartford		Goss Stadium at Coleman Field • Corvallis, Oregon	W 13–2	9–3	–
13	March 8	Oregon		Goss Stadium at Coleman Field • Corvallis, Oregon	W 4–1	10–3	–
14	March 11	New Mexico State		Goss Stadium at Coleman Field • Corvallis, Oregon	W 7–0	11–3	–
15	March 12	VMI		Goss Stadium at Coleman Field • Corvallis, Oregon	W 13–3	12–3	–
16	March 13	VMI		Goss Stadium at Coleman Field • Corvallis, Oregon	W 5–1	13–3	–
17	March 18	at Long Beach State	No. 23	Blair Field • Long Beach, California	W 4–0	14–3	–
18	March 19	at Long Beach State	No. 23	Blair Field • Long Beach, California	W 9–6	15–3	–
19	March 19	at Long Beach State	No. 23	Blair Field • Long Beach, California	L 1–2 (11)	15–4	–
20	March 22	Seattle	No. 26	Goss Stadium at Coleman Field • Corvallis, Oregon	L 4–5	15–5	–
21	March 23	Seattle	No. 26	Goss Stadium at Coleman Field • Corvallis, Oregon	W 4–2	16–5	–
22	March 25	UC Santa Barbara	No. 26	Goss Stadium at Coleman Field • Corvallis, Oregon	W 6–3	17–5	–
23	March 26	UC Santa Barbara	No. 26	Goss Stadium at Coleman Field • Corvallis, Oregon	W 11–5	18–5	–
24	March 27	UC Santa Barbara	No. 26	Goss Stadium at Coleman Field • Corvallis, Oregon	L 3–8	18–6	–

April (14–2)

#	Date	Opponent	Rank	Site/stadium	Score	Overall record	Pac-10 record
25	April 1	at No. 17 Arizona	No. 29	Sancet Stadium • Tucson, Arizona	L 0–18	18–7	0–1
26	April 2	at No. 17 Arizona	No. 29	Sancet Stadium • Tucson, Arizona	W 10–4	19–7	1–1
27	April 3	at No. 17 Arizona	No. 29	Sancet Stadium • Tucson, Arizona	W 8–4	20–7	2–1
28	April 5	at Portland	No. 20	Joe Etzel Field • Portland, Oregon	W 11–1	21–7	–
29	April 8	No. 5 Arizona State	No. 20	Goss Stadium at Coleman Field • Corvallis, Oregon	W 5–3	22–7	3–1
30	April 9	No. 5 Arizona State	No. 20	Goss Stadium at Coleman Field • Corvallis, Oregon	W 7–6	23–7	4–1
31	April 10	No. 5 Arizona State	No. 20	Goss Stadium at Coleman Field • Corvallis, Oregon	W 9–6	24–7	5–1
32	April 15	at No. 21 Stanford	No. 10	Sunken Diamond • Stanford, California	W 1–0	25–7	6–1
33	April 16	at No. 21 Stanford	No. 10	Sunken Diamond • Stanford, California	W 8–1	26–7	7–1
34	April 17	at No. 21 Stanford	No. 10	Sunken Diamond • Stanford, California	W 6–4	27–7	8–1
35	April 21	Washington State	No. 7	Goss Stadium at Coleman Field • Corvallis, Oregon	W 4–2	28–7	9–1
36	April 22	Washington State	No. 7	Goss Stadium at Coleman Field • Corvallis, Oregon	W 7–6	29–7	10–1
37	April 23	Washington State	No. 7	Goss Stadium at Coleman Field • Corvallis, Oregon	L 0–2	29–8	10–2
38	April 26	at Portland	No. 6	Joe Etzel Field • Portland, Oregon	W 6–1	30–8	–
39	April 29	at No. 13 UCLA	No. 6	Jackie Robinson Stadium • Los Angeles, California	W 7–5	31–8	11–2
40	April 30	at No. 13 UCLA	No. 6	Jackie Robinson Stadium • Los Angeles, California	W 2–0	32–8	12–2

May (6–8)

#	Date	Opponent	Rank	Site/stadium	Score	Overall record	Pac-10 record
41	May 1	at No. 13 UCLA	No. 6	Jackie Robinson Stadium • Los Angeles, California	L 2–5	32–9	12–3
42	May 3	Oregon	No. 4	Goss Stadium at Coleman Field • Corvallis, Oregon	L 2–7	32–10	–
43	May 7	No. 24 California	No. 4	Goss Stadium at Coleman Field • Corvallis, Oregon	W 3–0	33–10	13–3
44	May 7	No. 24 California	No. 4	Goss Stadium at Coleman Field • Corvallis, Oregon	L 2–6	33–11	13–4
45	May 8	No. 24 California	No. 4	Goss Stadium at Coleman Field • Corvallis, Oregon	W 4–2	34–11	14–4
46	May 10	Portland	No. 3	Goss Stadium at Coleman Field • Corvallis, Oregon	W 13–3	35–11	–
47	May 13	vs. Washington	No. 3	Safeco Field • Seattle, Washington	W 6–4	36–11	15–4
48	May 14	at Washington	No. 3	Husky Ballpark • Seattle, Washington	W 9–3	37–11	16–4
49	May 14	at Washington	No. 3	Husky Ballpark • Seattle, Washington	L 6–7	37–12	16–5
50	May 20	USC	No. 2	Goss Stadium at Coleman Field • Corvallis, Oregon	W 7–2	38–12	17–5
51	May 21	USC	No. 2	Goss Stadium at Coleman Field • Corvallis, Oregon	L 3–8	38–13	17–6
52	May 22	USC	No. 2	Goss Stadium at Coleman Field • Corvallis, Oregon	L 3–4	38–14	17–7
53	May 27	at Oregon	No. 6	PK Park • Eugene, Oregon	L 1–4	38–15	17–8
54	May 28	at Oregon	No. 6	PK Park • Eugene, Oregon	L 1–4	38–16	17–9
55	May 29	at Oregon	No. 6	PK Park • Eugene, Oregon	L 0–6	38–17	17–10

Postseason (3–2)
NCAA tournament: Corvallis Regional (3–0)

#	Date	Opponent	Seed/Rank	Site/stadium	Score	Overall record	NCAAT record
56	June 3	(4) Arkansas–Little Rock	(1) No. 13	Goss Stadium at Coleman Field • Corvallis, Oregon	W 7–4	39–17	1–0
57	June 4	(2) No. 25 Creighton	(1) No. 13	Goss Stadium at Coleman Field • Corvallis, Oregon	W 5–1	40–17	2–0
58	June 5	(3) Georgia	(1) No. 13	Goss Stadium at Coleman Field • Corvallis, Oregon	W 6–4	41–17	3–0

NCAA tournament: Nashville Super Regional (0–2)

#	Date	Opponent	Seed/Rank	Site/stadium	Score	Overall record	NCAAT record
59	June 10	at (6) No. 3 Vanderbilt	No. 9	Hawkins Field • Nashville, Tennessee	L 1–11	41–18	3–1
60	June 11	at (6) No. 3 Vanderbilt	No. 9	Hawkins Field • Nashville, Tennessee	L 3–9	41–19	3–2

== Rankings ==
Ranking movements Legend: ██ Increase in ranking ██ Decrease in ranking — = Not ranked RV = Received votes
	Week																		
Poll	Pre	1	2	3	4	5	6	7	8	9	10	11	12	13	14	15	16	17	Final
Coaches'	RV	RV*	RV	RV	RV	22	20	19	15	8	9	7	7	7	10	16	16*	16*	11
Baseball America	—	—	—	—	—	23	23	19	9	3	3	3	2	2	6	15	15*	15*	10
Collegiate Baseball^	RV	—	—	—	23	26	29	20	10	7	6	4	3	2	6	13	9	10	10
NCBWA†	RV	RV	RV	RV	30	26	27	27	17	15	12	8	10	10	13	18	18*	12	12

^ Collegiate Baseball ranked 40 teams in their preseason poll, but only ranked 30 teams weekly during the season.
† NCBWA ranks 30 teams in their preseason poll, but only ranks 25 teams weekly during the season.
* A new poll was not released for this week, so for comparison purposes, the previous week's ranking is inserted in this week's slot.

== See also ==
- Oregon State Beavers baseball
- 2011 NCAA Division I baseball season
