= 2011 UCLA Bruins baseball team =

American college baseball season

2011 UCLA Bruins baseball

Pacific-10 Regular Season Champions

Los Angeles Regional Finals vs. UC Irvine, L, 3-4
- Conference: Pacific-10 Conference

Ranking
- Coaches: No. 18
- Record: 35–24 (18–9 Pac-10)
- Head coach: John Savage (7th season)
- Assistant coaches: Rick Vanderhook (3rd season); T. J. Bruce (1st season); Jake Silverman (1st season)
- Home stadium: Jackie Robinson Stadium

2011 Pacific-10 Conference baseball standings
	Conf.				Overall
Team	W		L	PCT	W		L	PCT
No. 18 UCLA ‍†‍‍^{y}	18	–	9	.667	35	–	24	.593
No. 11 Arizona State ‍‍‍^{y}	17	–	10	.630	42	–	16	.724
No. 16 Oregon State ‍‍‍^{y}	17	–	10	.630	41	–	17	.707
Arizona ‍‍‍^{y}	15	–	12	.556	39	–	21	.650
No. 21 Stanford ‍‍‍^{y}	14	–	12	.538	35	–	20	.636
California ‍‍‍^{y}	13	–	13	.500	35	–	21	.625
USC ‍‍‍	13	–	14	.481	25	–	31	.446
Oregon ‍‍‍	11	–	16	.407	33	–	26	.559
Washington State ‍‍‍	10	–	17	.370	26	–	28	.481
Washington ‍‍‍	6	–	21	.222	17	–	37	.315
† – Conference champion ‡ – Pac-10 Conference champion y – Invited to the 2011 NCAA Division I baseball tournament As of June 8, 2011; Rankings from Coaches' Poll

The 2011 UCLA Bruins baseball team represented the University of California, Los Angeles in the 2011 NCAA Division I baseball season. The team played their home games in Jackie Robinson Stadium. The Bruins finished the season with a 35–24 overall record, and won the Pacific-10 Conference Championship with 18 wins and 9 losses. The team automatically qualified for the 2011 NCAA Division I baseball tournament, and were seeded #1 in the Los Angeles Regional. The Bruins lost the first game of the double-elimination format to the San Francisco Dons, 0–3. They then beat Fresno State 3–1 and San Francisco 4–1 to reach the regional finals. UC Irvine was undefeated coming into the game, and UCLA would have to beat them twice in order to become the regional champion. After beating San Francisco a little over one hour earlier, the Bruins took the field at Jackie Robinson stadium as the visiting team at 6 pm. The Bruins scored one run each in the 1st, 4th, and 5th innings, and gave up two runs each in the 5th and 9th. UC Irvine went on to play the Virginia Cavaliers in the Charlottesville Super Regional.

== Previous season ==
UCLA finished the 2010 regular season as the #2 team in the Pacific-10 Conference, and lost to South Carolina in the 2010 College World Series. Junior pitching aces Trevor Bauer and Gerrit Cole, along with 18 other lettermen, returned from last year's team to play for the 2011 team.

== Roster ==
2011 UCLA Bruins baseball team
Players
Coaches

#	Pos.	Name	B/T	Height	Weight	Year	Previous school	Home town
23	OF	Brenton Allen	L/L	6 ft 1 in (1.85 m)	205 lb (93 kg)	Fr	Gahr HS	Cerritos, CA
25	OF	Beau Amaral	L/L	5 ft 10 in (1.78 m)	175 lb (79 kg)	So	Huntington Beach HS	Huntington Beach, CA
47	RHP	Trevor Bauer	R/R	6 ft 1 in (1.85 m)	175 lb (79 kg)	Jr	Hart HS	Valencia, CA
35	LHP	Mitchell Beacom	L/L	6 ft 8 in (2.03 m)	235 lb (107 kg)	RS Jr	University City HS	San Diego, CA
34	RHP	Chase Brewer	R/R	6 ft 4 in (1.93 m)	210 lb (95 kg)	RS So	Chaparral HS	Paradise Valley, AZ
11	C	Trevor Brown	R/R	6 ft 2 in (1.88 m)	170 lb (77 kg)	So	Hart HS	Valencia, CA
24	OF	Brian Carroll	R/R	5 ft 10 in (1.78 m)	170 lb (77 kg)	Fr	Granite Hills HS	La Mesa, CA
12	RHP	Gerrit Cole	R/R	6 ft 4 in (1.93 m)	220 lb (100 kg)	Jr	Orange Lutheran HS	Santa Ana, CA
40	RHP	Ryan Deeter	R/R	6 ft 0 in (1.83 m)	165 lb (75 kg)	RS Fr	Newark Memorial HS	Newark, CA
14	INF	Dean Espy	R/R	6 ft 1 in (1.85 m)	210 lb (95 kg)	Jr	South Mountain CC	Mesa, AZ
27	INF	Pat Gallagher	L/R	6 ft 2 in (1.88 m)	215 lb (98 kg)	Fr	Reno HS	Reno, NV
20	OF	Jeff Gelalich	L/R	6 ft 1 in (1.85 m)	195 lb (88 kg)	So	Bonita HS	LaVerne, CA
21	OF	Chris Giovinazzo	R/R	6 ft 0 in (1.83 m)	205 lb (93 kg)	Sr	Laguna Hills HS	Laguna Hills, CA
36	INF	Matt Giovinazzo	R/R	6 ft 0 in (1.83 m)	190 lb (86 kg)	RS Fr	Laguna Hills HS	Laguna Hills, CA
48	RHP	Scott Griggs	R/R	6 ft 4 in (1.93 m)	205 lb (93 kg)	So	San Ramon Valley HS	Alamo, CA
26	RHP	Jordan Haver	R/R	6 ft 5 in (1.96 m)	210 lb (95 kg)	RS Sr	Wilson HS	Long Beach, CA
8	C	Tyler Heineman	S/R	5 ft 10 in (1.78 m)	175 lb (79 kg)	So	Windward School	Pacific Palisades, CA
17	C	Dennis Holt	L/L	6 ft 2 in (1.88 m)	185 lb (84 kg)	So	Esperanza HS	Yorba Linda, CA
7	OF	Cody Keefer	L/R	6 ft 1 in (1.85 m)	190 lb (86 kg)	So	Davis Senior HS	Davis, CA
41	RHP	Brandon Lodge	R/R	6 ft 2 in (1.88 m)	185 lb (84 kg)	RS Jr	Tesoro HS	Coto de Caza, CA
44	INF	Matt Mosher	L/R	6 ft 5 in (1.96 m)	235 lb (107 kg)	RS So	Menlo-Atherton HS	Menlo Park, CA
30	OF	Marc Navarro	L/R	5 ft 11 in (1.8 m)	180 lb (82 kg)	RS Jr	Santa Margarita HS	Laguna Hills, CA
9	RHP	Adam Plutko	R/R	6 ft 3 in (1.91 m)	190 lb (86 kg)	Fr	Glendora HS	Glendora, CA
5	INF	Javier Luque	L/L	5 ft 8 in (1.73 m)	165 lb (75 kg)	Fr	Golden Valley HS	Merced, CA
18	INF	Cody Regis	L/R	6 ft 2 in (1.88 m)	215 lb (98 kg)	So	Glendora HS	Glendora, CA
3	C	Steve Rodriguez	L/R	6 ft 1 in (1.85 m)	195 lb (88 kg)	Jr	St. John Bosco HS	Lomita, CA
6	INF	Jacob Shirley	R/R	6 ft 1 in (1.85 m)	185 lb (84 kg)	Fr	South Hills HS	Covina, CA
31	RHP	Nick Vander Tuig	R/R	6 ft 3 in (1.91 m)	190 lb (86 kg)	Fr	Oakdale HS	Oakdale, CA
10	INF	Pat Valaika	R/R	5 ft 11 in (1.8 m)	170 lb (77 kg)	Fr	Hart HS	Valencia, CA
4	INF	Aaron Weimer	L/R	5 ft 11 in (1.8 m)	175 lb (79 kg)	RS Fr	Bullard HS	Fresno, CA
32	RHP	Zack Weiss	R/R	6 ft 2 in (1.88 m)	210 lb (95 kg)	Fr	Northwood HS	Irvine, CA
1	INF	Adrian Williams	R/R	6 ft 0 in (1.83 m)	170 lb (77 kg)	Jr	Canyon Springs HS	Moreno Valley, CA
15	INF	Kevin Williams	L/R	6 ft 0 in (1.83 m)	185 lb (84 kg)	Fr	Crespi HS	Van Nuys, CA

Head coach

John Savage

Assistant coach(es)

Rick Vanderhook
T.J. Bruce
Jake Silverman

Legend

- (C) Team captain
- (S) Suspended
- (I) Ineligible
- Injured
- Current redshirt

Roster
Last update: December 21, 2011

== Schedule ==
2011 UCLA Bruins baseball game log
Regular season
February

#	Date	Opponent	Site/stadium	Score	Win	Loss	Save	Attendance	Overall record	Pac-10 record
1	February 18	San Francisco	Jackie Robinson Stadium	1–0	G. Cole (1–0)	M. Lujan (0–1)	None	623	1–0	–
2	February 19	San Francisco	Jackie Robinson Stadium	4–1	T. Bauer (1–0)	K. Zimmer (0–1)	N. Vander Tuig (1)	645	2–0	–
3	February 20	San Francisco	Jackie Robinson Stadium	3–0	A. Plutko (1–0)	M. Hiserman (0–1)	N. Vander Tuig (2)	917	3–0	–
4	February 22	Pepperdine	Jackie Robinson Stadium	9–0	S. Griggs (1–0)	M. Maurer (0–1)	None	567	4–0	–
5	February 26	San Jose State	Jackie Robinson Stadium	3–5	R. Padilla (2–0)	T. Bauer (1–1)	None	566	4–1	–
6	February 27	San Jose State	Jackie Robinson Stadium	3–8	B. McFarland (1–0)	G. Cole (1–1)	None	703	4–2	–
7	February 27	San Jose State	Jackie Robinson Stadium	12–2	A. Plutko (2–0)	A. Hennessey	None	703	5–2	–

March

#	Date	Opponent	Site/stadium	Score	Win	Loss	Save	Attendance	Overall record	Pac-10 record
8	March 1	San Diego State	Tony Gwynn Stadium	5–2	Z. Weiss (1–0)	B. Crabb (0–2)	None	790	6–2	–
9	March 4	Nebraska	Hawks Field	1–0 ^{11}	N. Vander Tuig (1–0)	C. Hauptman (1–1)	None	1,120	7–2	–
10	March 5	Nebraska	Hawks Field	1–2 ^{12}					7–3	–
11	March 6	Nebraska	Hawks Field	4–5 ^{11}					7–4	–
12	March 11	Georgia	Jackie Robinson Stadium	2–6					7–5	–
13	March 12	St. Mary's	Jackie Robinson Stadium	10–2					8–5	–
14	March 13	USC	Dodger Stadium	0–2					8–6	–
–	March 20	Cal Poly	San Luis Obispo, CA	Canceled					8–6	–
15	March 21	Cal Poly	San Luis Obispo, CA	1–2					8–7	–
16	March 21	Cal Poly	San Luis Obispo, CA	8–0					9–7	–
17	March 25	USC	Dedeaux Field	8–4					10–7	1–0
18	March 26	USC	Dedeaux Field	4–0					11–7	2–0
19	March 27	USC	Dedeaux Field	2–6					11–8	2–1
20	March 29	Cal State Fullerton	Goodwin Field	3–5					11–9	2–1

April

#	Date	Opponent	Site/stadium	Score	Win	Loss	Save	Attendance	Overall record	Pac-10 record
21	April 1	Washington	Jackie Robinson Stadium	2–1					12–9	3–1
22	April 2	Washington	Jackie Robinson Stadium	5–3					13–9	4–1
23	April 3	Washington	Jackie Robinson Stadium	3–2					14–9	5–1
24	April 5	UC Riverside	Riverside Sports Complex	4–5 ^{11}					14–10	5–1
25	April 8	Washington State	Bailey-Brayton Field	3–1					15–10	6–1
26	April 9	Washington State	Bailey-Brayton Field	10–3					16–10	7–1
27	April 10	Washington State	Bailey-Brayton Field	2–3					16–11	7–2
28	April 12	Long Beach State	Jackie Robinson Stadium	6–4	Z. Weiss (2–1)	J. Stassi (0–1)	N. Vander Tuig (4)	513	17–11	7–2
29	April 15	Arizona	Jackie Robinson Stadium	4–5	K. Heyer (6–1)	G. Cole (4–3)	M. Chaffee (4)	878	17–12	7–3
30	April 16	Arizona	Jackie Robinson Stadium	4–0	T. Bauer (7–1)	K. Simon (6–3)	None	1,057	18–12	8–3
31	April 17	Arizona	Jackie Robinson Stadium	8–5	N. Vander Tuig (3–2)	M. Chaffee (4–2)	None	1,319	19–12	9–3
32	April 19	San Diego State	Jackie Robinson Stadium	14–6	Z. Weiss (3–1)	M. Hachadorian (0–3)	None	622	20–12	9–3
33	April 21	Stanford	Sunken Diamond	4–7	M. Appel (3–4)	G. Cole (4–4)	None	1,622	20–13	9–4
34	April 22	Stanford	Sunken Diamond	4-1	T. Bauer (8–1)	J. Pries (4–4)	None	1,953	21–13	10–4
35	April 23	Stanford	Sunken Diamond	4-5	C. Reed (2–1)	N. Vander Tuig (3–3)	None	2,280	21–14	10–5
36	April 26	UC Irvine	Jackie Robinson Stadium	6–1	Z. Weiss (4–1)	A. Lines (3–2)	None	571	22–14	10–5
37	April 29	Oregon State	Jackie Robinson Stadium	5–7	S. Gaviglio (8–1)	G. Cole (4–5)	T. Bryant (7)	876	22–15	10–6
38	April 30	Oregon State	Jackie Robinson Stadium	0–2	J. Osich (6–1)	T. Bauer (8–2)	None	1,221	22–16	10–7

May

#	Date	Opponent	Site/stadium	Score	Win	Loss	Save	Attendance	Overall record	Pac-10 record
39	May 1	Oregon State	Jackie Robinson Stadium	5–2					23–16	11–7
40	May 3	Pepperdine	Eddy D. Field Stadium	10–0					24–16	11–7
41	May 6	Oregon	PK Park	7–1					25–16	12–7
42	May 7	Oregon	PK Park	3–1					26–16	13–7
43	May 8	Oregon	PK Park	4–0					27–16	14–7
44	May 10	Long Beach State	Blair Field	2–4					27–17	14–7
45	May 11	UC Santa Barbara	Jackie Robinson Stadium	4–5	C. Cuneo (1–0)	S. Griggs (1–1)	B. Fick (1)	404	27–18	14–7
46	May 13	Cal State Bakersfield	Jackie Robinson Stadium	1–5					27–19	14–7
47	May 14	Cal State Bakersfield	Jackie Robinson Stadium	10–1					28–19	14–7
48	May 15	Cal State Bakersfield	Jackie Robinson Stadium	3–2					29–19	14–7
–	May 17	Cal State Fullerton	Jackie Robinson Stadium	Cancelled					–	–
49	May 20	California	Jackie Robinson Stadium	0–4					29–20	14–8
50	May 21	California	Jackie Robinson Stadium	2–1					30–20	15–8
51	May 22	California	Jackie Robinson Stadium	5–2					31–20	16–8
52	May 24	UC Irvine	Cicerone Field	1–2					31–21	16–8
53	May 27	Arizona State	Packard Stadium	10–3					32–21	17–8
54	May 28	Arizona State	Packard Stadium	7–0					33–21	18–8
55	May 29	Arizona State	Packard Stadium	5–10	M. Lambson (5–3)	A. Plutko (6–4)	None	2,889	33–22	18–9

Postseason
NCAA Regionals

#	Date	Opponent	Site/stadium	Score	Win	Loss	Save	Attendance	Overall record	NCAAT Record
56	June 3	San Francisco	Jackie Robinson Stadium	0–3	K. Zimmer (6–4)	Gerrit Cole (6–8)	None	1,925	33–23	0–1
57	June 4	Fresno State	Jackie Robinson Stadium	3–1	Trevor Bauer (13–2)	Josh Poytress (7–3)	None	1,949	34–23	1–1
58	June 5	San Francisco	Jackie Robinson Stadium	4–1	A. Plutko (7–4)	J. Abramson (2–3)	N. Vander Tuig (9)	1,351	35–23	2–1
59	June 5	UC Irvine	Jackie Robinson Stadium	3–4	P. Ferragamo (2–0)	N. Vander Tuig (3–4)	None	1,461	35–24	2–2

== Rankings ==
Ranking movement Legend: ██ Increase in ranking. ██ Decrease in ranking. ██ Not ranked the previous week. NR = Not ranked. RV = Receiving votes.
Poll	Pre- season	Feb. 22	Mar. 1	Mar. 8	Mar. 15	Mar. 22	Mar. 29	Apr. 5	Apr. 12	Apr. 19	Apr. 26	May 3	May 10	May 17	May 24	May 31	June 8	June 15	Final Poll
Coaches' Poll	1	–				21	24								19	18	–	–	22
Baseball America	2	2	5	13	24	24	24								23	17	–	–	22
Collegiate Baseball^	3	2	8	12	15	14	15	16	12	11	13	13	13	17	17	12	20	20	20
NCBWA†	2	1	6	11	16	18	20	17	18	17	19	20	20	21	19	17	–	22	22
^ Collegiate Baseball ranked 40 teams in their preseason poll, but will only rank 30 teams weekly during the season. † NCBWA ranked 35 teams in their preseason poll, but will only rank 30 teams weekly during the season.

== UCLA Bruins in the 2011 MLB draft ==
The following members of the UCLA Bruins baseball program were drafted in the 2011 Major League Baseball draft. Gerrit Cole is the first Bruin to be picked #1 overall in the MLB First-Year Player Draft.

Player	Position	Round	Overall	MLB team
Gerrit Cole	RHP	1st	1st	Pittsburgh Pirates
Trevor Bauer	RHP	1st	3rd	Arizona Diamondbacks
Steven Rodriguez	C	15th	454th	Arizona Diamondbacks
Richard Espy	1B	15th	456th	Kansas City Royals
Mitchell Beacom	LHP	20th	627th	San Francisco Giants
Tyler Rahmatulla	2B	34th	1040th	St. Louis Cardinals
Javier Luque	LF	39th	1185th	Los Angeles Angels of Anaheim
Adrian Williams	SS	45th	1361st	Milwaukee Brewers

== Notes ==
- March 28, 2011 – Trevor Bauer was named Louisville Slugger National Player of the Week, fourth time in his career and second time this season.
- April 25, 2011 – Trevor Bauer earned Pac-10 Pitcher of the Week honors for three consecutive weeks.
- May 31, 2011 – Trevor Bauer was named the Pac-10 Pitcher of the Year; Adam Plutko and Beau Amaral were named to the All-Pac-10 First Team. Honorable honors went to Gerrit Cole, Mitchell Beacom, Steve Rodriguez, Cody Keefer and Nick Vander Tuig.
- June 2, 2011 – Trevor Bauer was the Collegiate Baseball Newspaper's National Player of the Year.
- June 3–5, 2011 – UCLA hosted the Los Angeles Regional of the NCAA Division I Baseball Championship at Jackie Robinson Stadium; UCLA lost the first game to San Francisco 3–0 on June 3, 2011.
- June 4, 2011 – The Bruins defeated Fresno State 3–1 in their second game of the Los Angeles Regional.
- June 10, 2011 – Trevor Bauer has been named the District IX Player of the Year, by the National Collegiate Baseball Writers Association (NCBWA).
- June 15, 2011 – Trevor Bauer was named College Player of the Year by Baseball America.
- July 15, 2011 – Bauer was the winner of the 2011 Golden Spikes Award.
- September 30, 2011 – Former players Ben Francisco, Philadelphia Phillies; Ron Roenicke, Milwaukee Brewers and Chase Utley, Philadelphia Phillies are participants in the 2011 MLB Playoffs.
