= Tony Arnerich =

American baseball coach (born 1979)

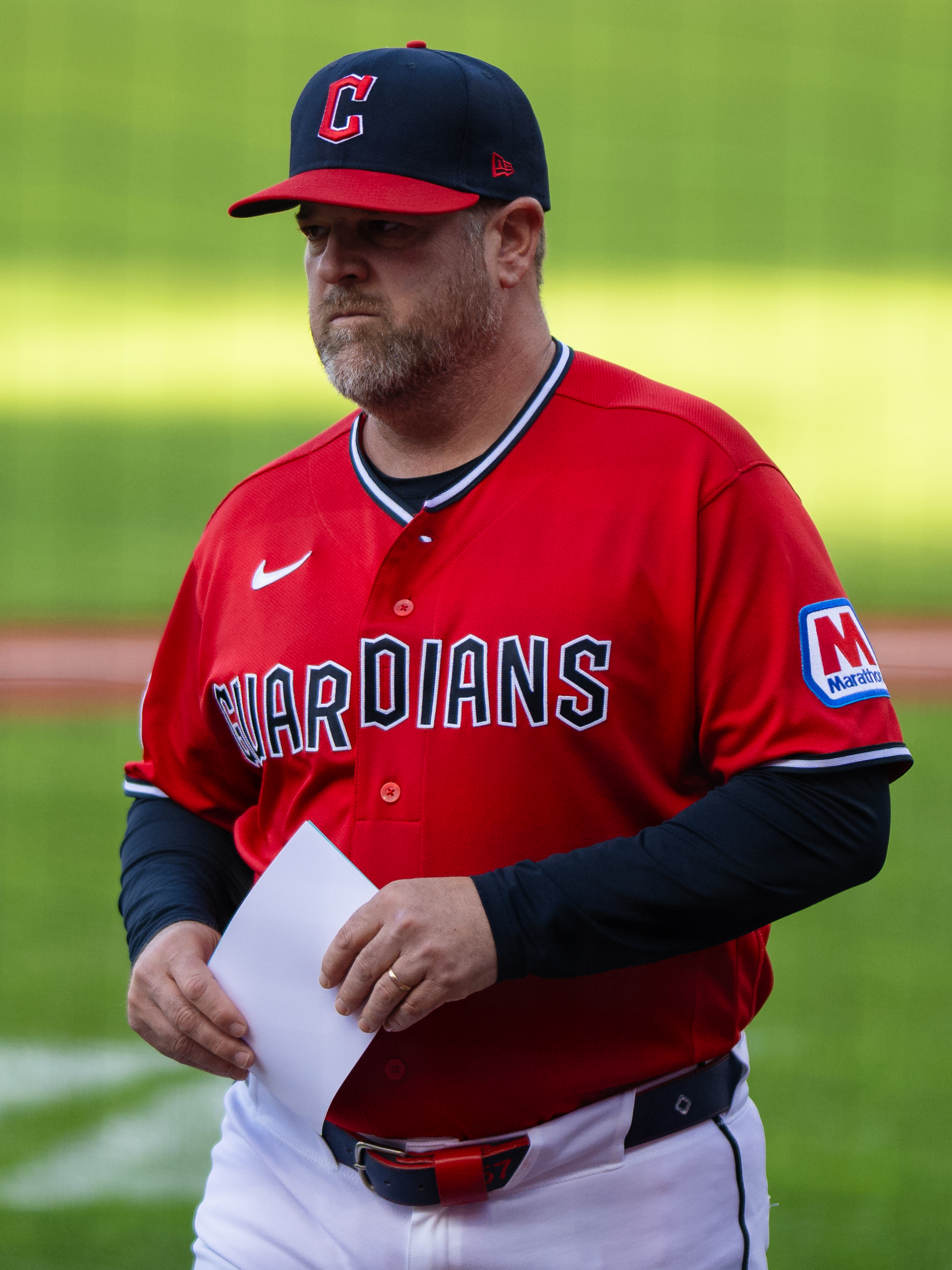
- Arnerich with the Cleveland Guardians in 2026

Cleveland Guardians – No. 57
- Bench coach
- Born: December 14, 1979 (age 46); San Francisco, California, U.S.
- Bats: Right Throws: Right

Teams
- As coach: Seattle Mariners (2022–2024); Cleveland Guardians (2026–present)

Anthony John Arnerich (born December 14, 1979) is an American professional baseball coach who is the bench coach for the Cleveland Guardians of Major League Baseball (MLB). He is a former minor league baseball catcher.

A California native, Arnerich attended college in Texas. After his junior year, he signed with the Kansas City Royals and played for minor league baseball teams in Iowa, Delaware, and Kansas from 2001 to 2004. Arnerich then joined the Florida Marlins and played minor league in North Carolina and Florida in 2004 and 2005.

Returning to California, Arnerich began coaching college teams in 2006 and earned a bachelor's degree in 2008. He coached a collegiate summer team in Minnesota from 2007 to 2009. Arnerich joined the Mariners in 2014, and was named a hitting coach in 2022. In 2024, he became the team's bullpen coach, replacing Stephen Vogt.

== Early education and minor league play ==
Arnerich graduated from Montgomery High School in Santa Rosa, California, in 1998. He attended Santa Rosa Junior College for two years and then transferred to Texas Tech University to play college baseball for the Texas Tech Red Raiders. After his junior season, he signed a free agent contract with the Kansas City Royals organization. In 2001 and 2002, Arnerich played for the Burlington Bees. In 2002 and 2003, he was with the Wilmington Blue Rocks, and in 2003 and 2004 it was the Wichita Wranglers. He played in the Florida Marlins organization before retiring as a player, with the Carolina Mudcats and Greensboro Bats in 2004, and the Jupiter Hammerheads in 2004 and 2005.

Arnerich ended his minor league career with a .231 batting average, 8 home runs, and three stolen bases in 234 games. He also pitched in four games for the Hammerheads in 2004, posting a 0.82 earned run average in 11 innings pitched.

== Coaching and degree ==
Arnerich became an assistant coach in 2006 at Sonoma State University, where he earned a Bachelor of Science degree in sociology in 2008. He coached for the St. Cloud River Bats summer team from 2007 to 2009, and the California Golden Bears from 2007 to 2014, during which the team went to the College World Series in 2011. In 2014, he joined the Seattle Mariners organization, as a hitting and catching coordinator beginning in 2017. The Mariners promoted Arnerich to minor league field coordinator in 2020, major league hitting coach for the 2022 season, and bullpen coach in 2024.

On November 13, 2025, Arnerich was hired by the Cleveland Guardians as their bench coach.

== Personal life ==
Arnerich has coarctation of the aorta, a narrowing of the artery from the heart. He received a mechanical valve in 2012, but developed a staph infection near the device in 2013. In October 2013, his doctors said a second surgery to replace the valve was necessary, with only a 50/50 chance of his surviving it. A later CT scan showed the infection had cleared, however, and Arnerich returned to work in January 2014.

During a COVID-19 pandemic lockdown in spring 2020, Arnerich joined other Mariners players in posting video drills to encourage kids to continue in baseball activity. Arnerich's fielding drill video included his young son and daughter.
