= 2011 NCAA Division I baseball season =

Baseball season

- Duration: February 18, 2011 – June 29, 2011
- Number of teams: 300
- Preseason No. 1: Florida; TCU; UCLA

Tournament
- Duration: June 3–29, 2011
- Most conference bids: ACC and SEC (7)

College World Series
- Champions: South Carolina (2nd title)
- Runners-up: Florida (7th CWS Appearance)
- Winning coach: Ray Tanner (2nd title)
- MOP: Scott Wingo (South Carolina)

Seasons
- ← 2010 2012 →

The 2011 NCAA Division I baseball season play of college baseball in the United States, organized by the National Collegiate Athletic Association (NCAA) at the Division I level, began on February 18, 2011. The season progressed through the regular season, many conference tournaments and championship series, and concluded with the 2011 NCAA Division I baseball tournament and 2011 College World Series. The College World Series consisted of the eight remaining teams in the NCAA tournament. Although it was held in its annual location of Omaha, Nebraska, it was played at the newly constructed TD Ameritrade Park for the first time. It concluded on June 29, 2011, with the final game of the best of three championship series. South Carolina defeated Florida two games to none to claim their second championship.

== Realignment ==
=== Dropped programs ===
Duquesne dropped its varsity baseball program following the 2010 season.

=== Conference changes ===
New Orleans left the Sun Belt Conference to become a Division I independent.

== Preseason ==
The South Carolina Gamecocks entered the season as defending World Series champions. Among the four major baseball polls there were three different teams ranked preseason #1: the Florida Gators (Baseball America), TCU Horned Frogs (Collegiate Baseball, NCBWA), and UCLA Bruins (Coaches').

== Conference standings ==
America East Conference
	Conf				Overall			
Team	W	L	T	Pct	W	L	T	Pct
Stony Brook	22	2	0	.917	42	12	0	.778
Maine	18	6	0	.750	32	22	0	.593
Binghamton	13	10	0	.565	21	28	0	.429
Albany	11	11	0	.500	21	31	0	.404
Hartford	3	20	0	.130	6	43	0	.122
UMBC	2	20	0	.091	10	37	0	.213

Atlantic 10 Conference
	Conf				Overall			
Team	W	L	T	Pct	W	L	T	Pct
Charlotte	17	7	0	.708	42	14	0	.750
Rhode Island	16	8	0	.667	31	22	0	.585
Dayton	15	9	0	.625	32	27	0	.542
Xavier	14	10	0	.583	30	27	0	.526
La Salle	13	11	0	.542	28	26	0	.519
Richmond	13	11	0	.542	29	27	0	.518
St. Bonaventure	13	11	0	.542	23	23	0	.500
Fordham	12	11	0	.522	31	23	0	.574
St. Joseph's	11	13	0	.458	21	31	0	.404
St. Louis	10	14	0	.417	29	26	0	.527
George Washington	9	15	0	.375	19	36	0	.345
Massachusetts	8	15	0	.348	17	29	0	.370
Temple	4	20	0	.167	24	29	0	.453

Atlantic Coast Conference
	Conf				Overall			
Team	W	L	T	Pct	W	L	T	Pct
Atlantic Division
Florida State	19	11	0	.633	42	17	0	.724
Clemson	17	13	0	.567	41	18	0	.695
North Carolina State	15	15	0	.500	34	25	0	.576
Wake Forest	15	15	0	.500	25	31	0	.446
Boston College	7	22	0	.241	17	33	0	.340
Maryland	5	25	0	.167	24	35	0	.375
Coastal Division
Virginia	22	8	0	.733	49	9	0	.842
Georgia Tech	22	8	0	.733	40	19	0	.678
North Carolina	20	10	0	.667	45	14	0	.763
Miami (FL)	19	10	0	.655	36	21	0	.632
Virginia Tech	11	19	0	.367	30	25	0	.545
Duke	7	23	0	.233	26	30	0	.464

Atlantic Sun Conference
	Conf				Overall			
Team	W	L	T	Pct	W	L	T	Pct
Stetson	23	7	0	.767	41	18	0	.695
Jacksonville	19	11	0	.633	36	22	0	.621
Kennesaw State	18	11	0	.621	32	25	0	.561
Mercer	17	12	0	.586	39	20	0	.661
East Tennessee State	16	12	0	.571	36	21	0	.632
Belmont	17	13	0	.567	36	24	0	.600
Florida Gulf Coast	16	14	0	.533	27	28	0	.491
North Florida	13	17	0	.433	27	27	0	.500
South Carolina-Upstate	10	18	0	.357	19	36	0	.345
Lipscomb	10	20	0	.333	19	36	0	.345
Campbell	3	27	0	.100	17	37	0	.315

Big East Conference
	Conf				Overall			
Team	W	L	T	Pct	W	L	T	Pct
Connecticut	22	5	0	.815	41	17	1	.707
St. John's	18	8	0	.692	35	20	0	.648
Pittsburgh	16	11	0	.593	33	23	0	.589
Seton Hall	14	13	0	.519	33	23	0	.582
Cincinnati	14	13	0	.519	30	27	0	.526
Louisville	14	13	0	.519	32	29	0	.525
West Virginia	14	13	0	.519	28	27	0	.509
Notre Dame	13	13	0	.500	23	29	0	.442
South Florida	13	14	0	.481	25	29	0	.463
Rutgers	11	16	0	.407	20	30	0	.400
Villanova	7	20	0	.259	20	32	0	.385
Georgetown	5	22	0	.185	23	33	0	.411

Big South Conference
	Conf				Overall			
Team	W	L	T	Pct	W	L	T	Pct
Coastal Carolina	20	7	0	.741	41	18	0	.695
Liberty	18	9	0	.667	35	24	0	.593
Charleston Southern	15	12	0	.556	29	30	0	.492
Winthrop	15	12	0	.556	27	30	0	.474
Gardner–Webb	14	13	0	.519	34	23	0	.596
Radford	14	13	0	.519	31	25	0	.554
VMI	14	13	0	.519	27	24	0	.529
High Point	9	18	0	.333	24	32	0	.429
Presbyterian	9	18	0	.333	24	32	0	.429
UNC Asheville	7	20	0	.259	15	37	0	.288

Big Ten Conference
	Conf				Overall			
Team	W	L	T	Pct	W	L	T	Pct
Michigan State	15	9	0	.625	36	21	0	.632
Illinois	15	9	0	.625	28	25	0	.528
Purdue	14	10	0	.583	37	20	0	.649
Minnesota	13	11	0	.542	25	24	0	.510
Ohio State	13	11	0	.542	26	27	0	.491
Penn State	12	12	0	.500	32	22	0	.593
Indiana	11	13	0	.458	30	25	0	.545
Northwestern	10	13	0	.435	20	29	0	.408
Iowa	9	15	0	.375	20	32	0	.385
Michigan	7	16	0	.304	17	37	0	.315

Big 12 Conference
	Conf				Overall			
Team	W	L	T	Pct	W	L	T	Pct
Texas	19	8	0	.704	43	15	0	.741
Texas A&M	19	8	0	.704	42	18	0	.695
Oklahoma	14	11	0	.560	41	17	0	.707
Oklahoma State	14	12	0	.538	35	23	0	.603
Baylor	13	14	0	.481	29	26	0	.527
Kansas State	12	14	0	.462	36	23	0	.610
Texas Tech	12	15	0	.444	33	25	0	.569
Missouri	11	15	0	.423	27	32	0	.466
Nebraska	9	17	0	.346	30	25	0	.545
Kansas	9	18	0	.333	26	30	0	.464

Big West Conference
	Conf				Overall			
Team	W	L	T	Pct	W	L	T	Pct
Cal State Fullerton	19	5	0	.783	40	15	0	.722
UC Irvine	16	8	0	.696	39	16	0	.722
Cal Poly	15	9	0	.625	27	26	0	.519
Long Beach State	12	12	0	.500	29	27	0	.509
UC Riverside	11	13	0	.435	29	23	0	.549
UC Santa Barbara	10	14	0	.435	26	26	0	.500
UC Davis	10	14	0	.435	18	36	0	.340
Pacific	9	15	0	.348	17	37	0	.302
Cal State Northridge	6	18	0	.261	23	33	0	.418

Colonial Athletic Association
	Conf				Overall			
Team	W	L	T	Pct	W	L	T	Pct
James Madison	21	9	0	.700	40	17	0	.702
Old Dominion	19	11	0	.633	30	26	0	.536
North Carolina-Wilmington	18	12	0	.600	31	28	0	.525
Georgia State	17	13	0	.567	37	21	0	.638
Delaware	16	14	0	.533	27	26	0	.509
William and Mary	16	14	0	.533	26	29	0	.473
Towson	15	15	0	.500	26	28	0	.481
Virginia Commonwealth	12	18	0	.400	22	32	0	.407
Northeastern	12	18	0	.400	18	33	0	.353
Hofstra	12	18	0	.400	15	32	0	.319
George Mason	7	23	0	.233	21	32	0	.396

Conference USA
	Conf				Overall			
Team	W	L	T	Pct	W	L	T	Pct
Southern Mississippi	16	8	0	.667	39	17	0	.696
Rice	16	8	0	.667	41	19	0	.683
East Carolina	14	10	0	.583	39	19	0	.672
Central Florida	12	12	0	.500	38	21	0	.644
Memphis	12	12	0	.500	30	27	0	.526
Houston	12	12	0	.500	27	32	0	.458
Tulane	10	14	0	.417	31	26	0	.544
UAB	9	15	0	.375	29	28	0	.509
Marshall	7	17	0	.292	20	31	0	.392

Great West Conference
	Conf				Overall			
Team	W	L	T	Pct	W	L	T	Pct
Utah Valley	22	2	0	.917	34	22	0	.607
Northern Colorado	19	7	0	.731	24	32	0	.429
Houston Baptist	16	12	0	.571	22	40	0	.355
New York Tech	13	12	0	.520	19	32	0	.373
New Jersey Tech	12	16	0	.429	20	35	0	.364
Texas–Pan American	10	18	0	.357	21	32	0	.396
North Dakota	7	17	0	.292	12	35	0	.255
Chicago State	4	19	0	.174	9	41	0	.180

Horizon League
	Conf				Overall			
Team	W	L	T	Pct	W	L	T	Pct
Wright State	16	7	0	.696	36	17	0	.673
Illinois-Chicago	16	7	0	.696	28	26	0	.519
Milwaukee	15	10	0	.600	28	28	0	.500
Valparaiso	14	10	0	.583	25	32	0	.446
Butler	11	14	0	.440	23	28	0	.451
Youngstown State	7	16	0	.304	14	41	0	.255
Cleveland State	5	20	0	.200	12	43	0	.218

Ivy League
	Conf				Overall			
Team	W	L	T	Pct	W	L	T	Pct
Lou Gehrig Division
Princeton	15	5	0	.750	23	22	0	.511
Pennsylvania	10	10	0	.500	19	21	0	.475
Columbia	9	11	0	.450	19	25	0	.432
Cornell	7	13	0	.350	10	30	0	.250
Red Rolfe Division
Dartmouth	14	6	0	.700	30	12	0	.714
Yale	11	9	0	.550	23	19	0	.548
Brown	9	11	0	.450	13	29	0	.310
Harvard	5	15	0	.250	9	36	0	.200

Metro Atlantic Athletic Conference
	Conf				Overall			
Team	W	L	T	Pct	W	L	T	Pct
Manhattan	20	2	0	.909	34	17	0	.667
Rider	16	7	0	.696	33	18	0	.647
Siena	14	10	0	.583	28	30	0	.483
Marist	13	11	0	.542	35	17	0	.673
Fairfield	13	11	0	.542	22	25	0	.468
Canisius	12	10	0	.545	26	32	0	.448
Iona	7	17	0	.292	17	34	0	.333
St. Peter's	5	18	0	.217	16	34	0	.320
Niagara	5	19	0	.208	8	40	0	.167

Mid-American Conference
	Conf				Overall			
Team	W	L	T	Pct	W	L	T	Pct
East Division
Kent State	21	5	0	.808	43	15	0	.741
Miami (OH)	18	9	0	.667	35	25	0	.583
Bowling Green	11	14	0	.440	20	31	0	.392
Ohio	11	16	0	.407	27	27	0	.500
Akron	7	20	0	.259	16	37	0	.302
Buffalo	3	22	0	.120	14	38	0	.269
West Division
Central Michigan	17	9	0	.654	31	27	0	.534
Eastern Michigan	16	11	0	.593	37	22	0	.627
Northern Illinois	16	11	0	.593	30	27	0	.526
Toledo	15	12	0	.556	26	29	0	.473
Western Michigan	12	14	0	.462	26	31	0	.456
Ball State	11	15	0	.423	15	35	0	.300

Mid-Eastern Athletic Conference
	Conf				Overall			
Team	W	L	T	Pct	W	L	T	Pct
Bethune–Cookman	18	0	0	1.000	35	22	0	.614
Delaware State	11	7	0	.611	26	29	0	.473
North Carolina A&T	10	8	0	.556	21	34	0	.382
Norfolk State	9	9	0	.500	24	29	0	.453
Maryland-Eastern Shore	7	11	0	.389	9	41	0	.180
Florida A&M	6	12	0	.333	17	40	0	.298
Coppin State	2	16	0	.111	5	39	0	.114

Missouri Valley Conference
	Conf				Overall			
Team	W	L	T	Pct	W	L	T	Pct
Creighton	15	6	0	.714	44	14	0	.759
Wichita State	14	7	0	.667	39	26	0	.600
Illinois State	13	8	0	.619	36	18	0	.667
Missouri State	11	9	0	.550	33	23	0	.589
Southern Illinois	11	10	0	.524	23	34	0	.404
Indiana State	8	13	0	.381	29	28	0	.509
Evansville	7	13	0	.350	28	25	0	.528
Bradley	4	17	0	.190	22	32	0	.407

Mountain West Conference
	Conf				Overall			
Team	W	L	T	Pct	W	L	T	Pct
Texas Christian	20	3	0	.870	42	17	0	.712
Utah	16	7	0	.696	29	21	0	.580
Brigham Young	11	12	0	.478	31	27	0	.534
San Diego State	11	13	0	.458	22	36	0	.379
Nevada-Las Vegas	10	13	0	.435	33	25	0	.569
New Mexico	10	14	0	.417	20	39	0	.339
Air Force	4	20	0	.167	19	36	0	.345

Northeast Conference
	Conf				Overall			
Team	W	L	T	Pct	W	L	T	Pct
Monmouth	25	7	0	.781	36	19	0	.655
Sacred Heart	23	9	0	.719	34	21	0	.618
Long Island	19	11	0	.633	28	23	0	.549
Bryant	19	12	0	.613	30	23	0	.566
Central Connecticut State	17	14	0	.548	26	25	0	.510
Wagner	12	20	0	.375	18	33	0	.353
Quinnipiac	11	21	0	.344	15	32	0	.319
Fairleigh Dickinson	9	23	0	.281	12	38	0	.240
Mount St. Mary's	7	25	0	.219	15	35	0	.300

Ohio Valley Conference
	Conf				Overall			
Team	W	L	T	Pct	W	L	T	Pct
Austin Peay	17	6	0	.739	33	22	0	.600
Southeast Missouri State	14	8	0	.636	34	22	0	.607
Jacksonville State	14	9	0	.609	36	23	0	.610
Tennessee Tech	12	12	0	.500	25	29	0	.463
Eastern Kentucky	11	13	0	.458	21	36	0	.368
Tennessee-Martin	10	13	0	.435	20	36	0	.357
Eastern Illinois	9	12	0	.429	18	33	0	.353
Murray State	9	13	0	.409	19	32	0	.373
Morehead State	6	16	0	.273	10	39	0	.204

Pacific-10 Conference
	Conf				Overall			
Team	W	L	T	Pct	W	L	T	Pct
UCLA	18	9	0	.667	33	22	0	.600
Arizona State	17	10	0	.615	39	16	0	.709
Oregon State	17	10	0	.654	38	17	0	.691
Arizona	15	12	0	.538	36	16	0	.655
Stanford	14	12	0	.538	32	20	0	.615
California	13	13	0	.500	31	20	0	.608
USC	13	14	0	.468	25	31	0	.446
Oregon	11	16	0	.385	33	26	0	.559
Washington State	10	17	0	.346	26	28	0	.481
Washington	6	21	0	.231	17	37	0	.315

Patriot League
	Conf				Overall			
Team	W	L	T	Pct	W	L	T	Pct
Navy	12	8	0	.600	33	23	1	.588
Army	11	9	0	.550	22	26	0	.458
Lafayette	10	10	0	.500	18	30	0	.375
Bucknell	10	10	0	.500	25	28	0	.472
Holy Cross	9	11	0	.450	24	23	1	.510
Lehigh	8	12	0	.400	24	21	0	.533

Southeastern Conference
	Conf				Overall			
Team	W	L	T	Pct	W	L	T	Pct
East Division
Vanderbilt	22	8	0	.733	44	9	0	.830
South Carolina	22	8	0	.733	44	12	0	.786
Florida	22	8	0	.733	41	15	0	.732
Georgia	16	14	0	.533	28	28	0	.500
Kentucky	8	22	0	.267	25	30	0	.455
Tennessee	7	23	0	.233	25	29	0	.463
West Division
Arkansas	15	15	0	.500	38	19	0	.667
Mississippi State	14	16	0	.467	34	23	0	.596
Alabama	14	16	0	.467	33	26	0	.559
Auburn	14	16	0	.467	29	29	0	.500
LSU	13	17	0	.433	36	20	0	.643
Ole Miss	13	17	0	.433	30	25	0	.545

Southern Conference
	Conf				Overall			
Team	W	L	T	Pct	W	L	T	Pct
Elon	23	7	0	.766	36	21	0	.632
North Carolina-Greensboro	22	8	0	.733	34	20	0	.630
College of Charleston	18	12	0	.600	39	22	0	.639
Samford	18	12	0	.600	37	23	0	.617
Georgia Southern	18	12	0	.600	36	26	0	.581
Appalachian State	15	15	0	.500	33	27	0	.550
Furman	13	16	0	.448	24	33	0	.421
Western Carolina	12	18	0	.400	23	31	1	.426
Wofford	9	21	0	.300	22	33	0	.400
Davidson	8	21	0	.276	18	30	0	.375
The Citadel	8	22	0	.267	20	36	0	.357

Southland Conference
	Conf				Overall			
Team	W	L	T	Pct	W	L	T	Pct
Texas State	23	9	0	.719	40	23	0	.635
Stephen F. Austin	20	13	0	.606	37	23	0	.617
Texas A&M-Corpus Christi	19	14	0	.576	37	24	0	.607
Southeastern Louisiana	18	14	0	.562	35	22	0	.614
Sam Houston State	17	16	0	.515	35	24	0	.593
Texas-San Antonio	16	17	0	.485	27	32	0	.458
Texas-Arlington	15	17	0	.469	27	28	0	.491
Lamar	15	18	0	.455	29	27	0	.518
Nicholls State	15	18	0	.455	28	29	0	.491
McNeese State	14	19	0	.424	26	29	0	.473
Central Arkansas	13	20	0	.394	24	29	0	.453
Northwestern State	11	21	0	.344	22	32	0	.407

Southwestern Athletic Conference
	Conf				Overall			
Team	W	L	T	Pct	W	L	T	Pct
Eastern Division
Alcorn State	19	4	0	.826	26	27	0	.491
Mississippi Valley State	14	9	0	.609	18	36	0	.333
Jackson State	14	10	0	.583	27	26	0	.509
Alabama State	6	18	0	.250	14	29	0	.326
Alabama A&M	6	18	0	.250	10	39	0	.204
Western Division
Southern	16	8	0	.667	29	19	0	.604
Grambling State	14	10	0	.583	23	26	0	.469
Prairie View A&M	13	11	0	.542	25	21	0	.543
Texas Southern	10	14	0	.417	25	29	0	.463
Arkansas-Pine Bluff	7	17	0	.292	11	34	0	.244

Summit League
	Conf				Overall			
Team	W	L	T	Pct	W	L	T	Pct
Oral Roberts	21	7	0	.750	39	22	0	.639
South Dakota State	20	8	0	.714	37	20	0	.649
North Dakota State	15	12	0	.556	22	32	0	.407
Western Illinois	13	15	0	.464	21	38	0	.356
IUPU-Fort Wayne	12	16	0	.429	17	34	0	.333
Southern Utah	11	17	0	.393	23	31	0	.426
Oakland	10	18	0	.357	19	31	0	.380
Centenary	9	18	0	.333	12	31	0	.279

Sun Belt Conference
	Conf				Overall			
Team	W	L	T	Pct	W	L	T	Pct
Troy	21	9	0	.700	43	19	0	.694
Florida International	20	9	1	.683	40	20	1	.664
Louisiana-Lafayette	18	12	0	.600	31	27	0	.534
Western Kentucky	17	13	0	.567	33	24	0	.579
Florida Atlantic	17	13	0	.567	32	25	0	.561
South Alabama	15	15	0	.500	30	28	0	.517
Arkansas State	13	16	1	.450	27	31	1	.466
Arkansas-Little Rock	10	20	0	.333	24	34	0	.414
Middle Tennessee State	9	21	0	.300	18	37	0	.327
Louisiana-Monroe	9	21	0	.300	24	30	0	.444

West Coast Conference
	Conf				Overall			
Team	W	L	T	Pct	W	L	T	Pct
San Francisco	16	5	0	.762	31	23	0	.574
Gonzaga	15	6	0	.714	32	19	0	.627
Loyola Marymount	11	10	0	.524	30	25	0	.545
Portland	11	10	0	.524	23	31	0	.426
San Diego	11	10	0	.524	22	31	0	.415
St. Mary's	9	12	0	.429	27	28	0	.491
Pepperdine	7	14	0	.333	22	34	0	.393
Santa Clara	4	17	0	.190	17	34	0	.333

Western Athletic Conference
	Conf				Overall			
Team	W	L	T	Pct	W	L	T	Pct
Fresno State	17	7	0	.708	39	14	0	.736
Hawai'i	17	7	0	.708	33	24	0	.579
Louisiana Tech	12	12	0	.500	34	26	0	.567
Nevada	12	12	0	.500	24	31	0	.436
San Jose State	11	13	0	.458	35	26	0	.574
New Mexico State	9	15	0	.375	34	24	0	.586
Sacramento State	6	18	0	.250	19	39	0	.328

Division I Independents
Team	W	L	T	Pct
Dallas Baptist	42	20	0	.677
Longwood	28	18	0	.609
Cal State Bakersfield	33	22	0	.600
Savannah State	29	23	0	.558
Southern Illinois-Edwardsville	28	24	0	.538
Le Moyne	23	30	0	.434
Seattle	21	30	1	.413
North Carolina Central	7	39	0	.152
New Orleans	4	50	0	.074

Team won the conference tournament and the automatic bid to the NCAA tournament
Conference does not have conference tournament, so team won the autobid for finishing in first
Team received at-large bid to NCAA tournament

== Conference winners and tournaments ==
Of the 31 conferences that sponsored Division I baseball in 2011, 28 sponsored conference tournaments or championship series. With the exception of the Great West Conference, a provisional member of Division I, the winners of these tournaments received their conference's automatic bids to the NCAA tournament. Programs qualified for the conference tournaments based on their regular season against conference opponents, and tournament formats included double elimination, single elimination, and round robin.

Conference	Regular season winner	Conference Player of the Year	Conference Coach of the Year	Conference tournament	Tournament venue (city)	Tournament winner
America East Conference	Stony Brook	William Carmona, Stony Brook	Matt Senk, Stony Brook	2011 America East Conference baseball tournament	Joe Nathan Field • Stony Brook, NY	Maine
Atlantic Coast Conference	Atlantic – Florida State; Coastal – Georgia Tech/Virginia	Brad Miller, Clemson	Brian O'Connor, Virginia	2011 Atlantic Coast Conference baseball tournament	Durham Bulls Athletic Park • Durham, NC	Virginia
Atlantic Sun Conference	Stetson	Adam Brett Walker, Jacksonville	Pete Dunn, Stetson	2011 Atlantic Sun Conference baseball tournament	Dugan Field at Marsh Stadium • Nashville, TN	Belmont
Atlantic 10 Conference	Charlotte	Ben Thomas, Xavier	Jim Foster, Rhode Island	2011 Atlantic 10 Conference baseball tournament	Campbell's Field • Camden, NJ	Charlotte
Big East Conference	Connecticut	George Springer, Connecticut	Jim Penders, Connecticut	2011 Big East Conference baseball tournament	Bright House Field • Clearwater, FL	Seton Hall
Big South Conference	Coastal Carolina	Tommy La Stella, Coastal Carolina	Stuart Lake, Charleston Southern	2011 Big South Conference baseball tournament	Gray–Minor Stadium • Lexington, VA	Coastal Carolina
Big Ten Conference	Michigan State/Illinois	Jeff Holm, Michigan State	Jake Boss, Michigan State	2011 Big Ten Conference baseball tournament	Huntington Park • Columbus, OH	Illinois
Big 12 Conference	Texas/Texas A&M	Tyler Naquin, Texas A&M	Augie Garrido, Texas/Rob Childress, Texas A&M	2011 Big 12 Conference baseball tournament	RedHawks Ballpark • Oklahoma City, OK	Texas A&M
Big West Conference	Cal State Fullerton	Nick Ramirez, Cal State Fullerton	Dave Serrano, Cal State Fullerton	No tournament, regular season champion earns automatic bid		
Colonial Athletic Association	James Madison	Jake Lowery, James Madison	Nate Goulet, Old Dominion	2011 Colonial Athletic Association baseball tournament	Brooks Field • Wilmington, NC	James Madison
Conference USA	Southern Miss/Rice	Chad Zurcher, Memphis	Scott Berry, Southern Miss	2011 Conference USA baseball tournament	Trustmark Park • Pearl, MS	Rice
Great West Conference	Utah Valley	Effrey Valdez, NYIT	Eric Madsen, Utah Valley	2011 Great West Conference baseball tournament	Harold Kraft Memorial Field • Grand Forks, ND	Utah Valley
Horizon League	Wright State/Illinois–Chicago	Jake Hibberd, Wright State	Rob Cooper, Wright State	2011 Horizon League baseball tournament	Nischwitz Stadium • Dayton, OH	Wright State
Ivy League	Gehrig - Princeton; Rolfe - Dartmouth	Trey Rallis, Yale	—N/a	2011 Ivy League Baseball Championship Series	Bill Clarke Field • Princeton, NJ	Princeton
Metro Atlantic Athletic Conference	Manhattan	Sean Jamieson, Canisius/Dan Paolini, Siena	Kevin Leighton, Manhattan	2011 Metro Atlantic Athletic Conference baseball tournament	Waterfront Park • Trenton, NJ	Manhattan
Mid-American Conference	East - Kent State; West - Central Michigan	Tom Murphy, Buffalo	Scott Stricklin, Kent State	2011 Mid-American Conference baseball tournament	V.A. Memorial Stadium • Chillicothe, OH	Kent State
Mid-Eastern Athletic Conference	Bethune-Cookman	Scott Davis, Delaware State	Mervyl Melendez, Bethune-Cookman	2011 Mid–Eastern Athletic Conference baseball tournament	Jackie Robinson Ballpark • Daytona Beach, FL	Bethune-Cookman
Missouri Valley Conference	Creighton	Chris O'Brien, Wichita State	Ed Servais, Creighton	2011 Missouri Valley Conference baseball tournament	TD Ameritrade Park • Omaha, NE	Creighton
Mountain West Conference	Texas Christian	C. J. Cron, Utah	Jim Schlossnagle, Texas Christian	2011 Mountain West Conference baseball tournament	Tony Gwynn Stadium • San Diego, CA	New Mexico
Northeast Conference	Monmouth	Ryan Terry, Monmouth	Don Maines, Long Island	2011 Northeast Conference baseball tournament	Dodd Stadium • Norwich, CT	Sacred Heart
Ohio Valley Conference	Austin Peay	Trenton Moses, Southeast Missouri State	Gary McClure, Austin Peay	2011 Ohio Valley Conference baseball tournament	Pringles Park • Jackson, TN	Austin Peay
Pac-12 Conference	UCLA	Tony Renda, California	Pat Casey, Oregon State	No tournament, regular season champion earns automatic bid		
Patriot League	Navy	A. J. Miller, Lafayette	Paul Kostacopoulos, Navy	2011 Patriot League baseball tournament	Campus Sites	Navy
Southeastern Conference	East – Vanderbilt; East – Arkansas	Mike Zunino, Florida	Ray Tanner, South Carolina	2011 Southeastern Conference baseball tournament	Regions Park • Hoover, AL	Florida
Southern Conference	Elon	Victor Roache, Georgia Southern	Mike Gaski, UNC Greensboro	2011 Southern Conference baseball tournament	Joseph P. Riley Jr. Park • Charleston, SC	Georgia Southern
Southland Conference	Texas State	Bryson Myles, Stephen F. Austin	Ty Harrington, Texas State	2011 Southland Conference baseball tournament	Bobcat Ballpark • San Marcos, TX	Texas State
Southwestern Athletic Conference	East - Alcorn State; West - Southern	Frazier Hall, Southern	Barret Rey, Alcorn State	2011 Southwestern Athletic Conference baseball tournament	Fair Grounds Field • Shreveport, LA	Alcorn State
The Summit League	Oral Roberts	Bo Cuthbertson, Southern Utah	Rob Walton, Oral Roberts	2011 The Summit League baseball tournament	Sioux Falls Stadium • Sioux Falls, SD	Oral Roberts
Sun Belt Conference	Troy	Pablo Bermudez, Florida International; Adam Bryant, Troy	Bobby Pierce, Troy	2011 Sun Belt Conference baseball tournament	Warhawk Field • Monroe, LA	Arkansas-Little Rock
West Coast Conference	San Francisco	Kris Bryant, San Diego; Marco Gonzalez, Gonzaga	Nino Giarratano, San Francisco	No tournament, regular season champion earns automatic bid		
Western Athletic Conference	Fresno State/Hawaii	Dusty Robinson, Jr., Fresno State	Mike Trapasso, Hawaii	2011 Western Athletic Conference baseball tournament	HoHoKam Stadium • Mesa, AZ	Fresno State

== College World Series ==
The 2011 College World Series began on June 18, 2011 in Omaha, Nebraska. It was the first College World Series in 61 years not played at Rosenblatt Stadium; games were played at TD Ameritrade Park Omaha.

First round
1	Virginia	4
California	1
Texas A&M	4
4	South Carolina	5
California	7
Texas A&M	3
2	Florida	8
7	Texas	4
6	Vanderbilt	7
3	North Carolina	3
7	Texas	0
3	North Carolina	3

Second round
1	Virginia	1
4	South Carolina	7
California	1
1	Virginia	8
2	Florida	3
6	Vanderbilt	1
3	North Carolina	1
6	Vanderbilt	5

Semifinals
4	South Carolina	3^{13}	—
1	Virginia	2	—
2	Florida	6	—
6	Vanderbilt	4	—

Finals
4	South Carolina	2^{11}	5	—
2	Florida	1	2	—

== Award winners ==
=== Major player of the year awards ===
- Dick Howser Trophy: Taylor Jungmann, Texas
- Baseball America: Trevor Bauer, UCLA
- Collegiate Baseball: Trevor Bauer, UCLA
- American Baseball Coaches Association: Trevor Bauer, UCLA
- Golden Spikes Award Trevor Bauer, UCLA

=== Major coach of the year awards ===
- American Baseball Coaches Association: Ray Tanner, South Carolina
- Baseball America: Kevin O'Sullivan, Florida
- Collegiate Baseball Coach of the Year: Ray Tanner, South Carolina

=== Other major awards ===
- Johnny Bench Award (Catcher of the Year): Jake Lowery, James Madison
- Baseball America Freshman Of The Year: Colin Moran, North Carolina

== See also ==
- 2011 Alabama Crimson Tide baseball team
- 2011 California Golden Bears baseball team
- 2011 South Carolina Gamecocks baseball team
- 2011 UCLA Bruins baseball team
