= Nino Giarratano =

American college baseball coach (born 1962)

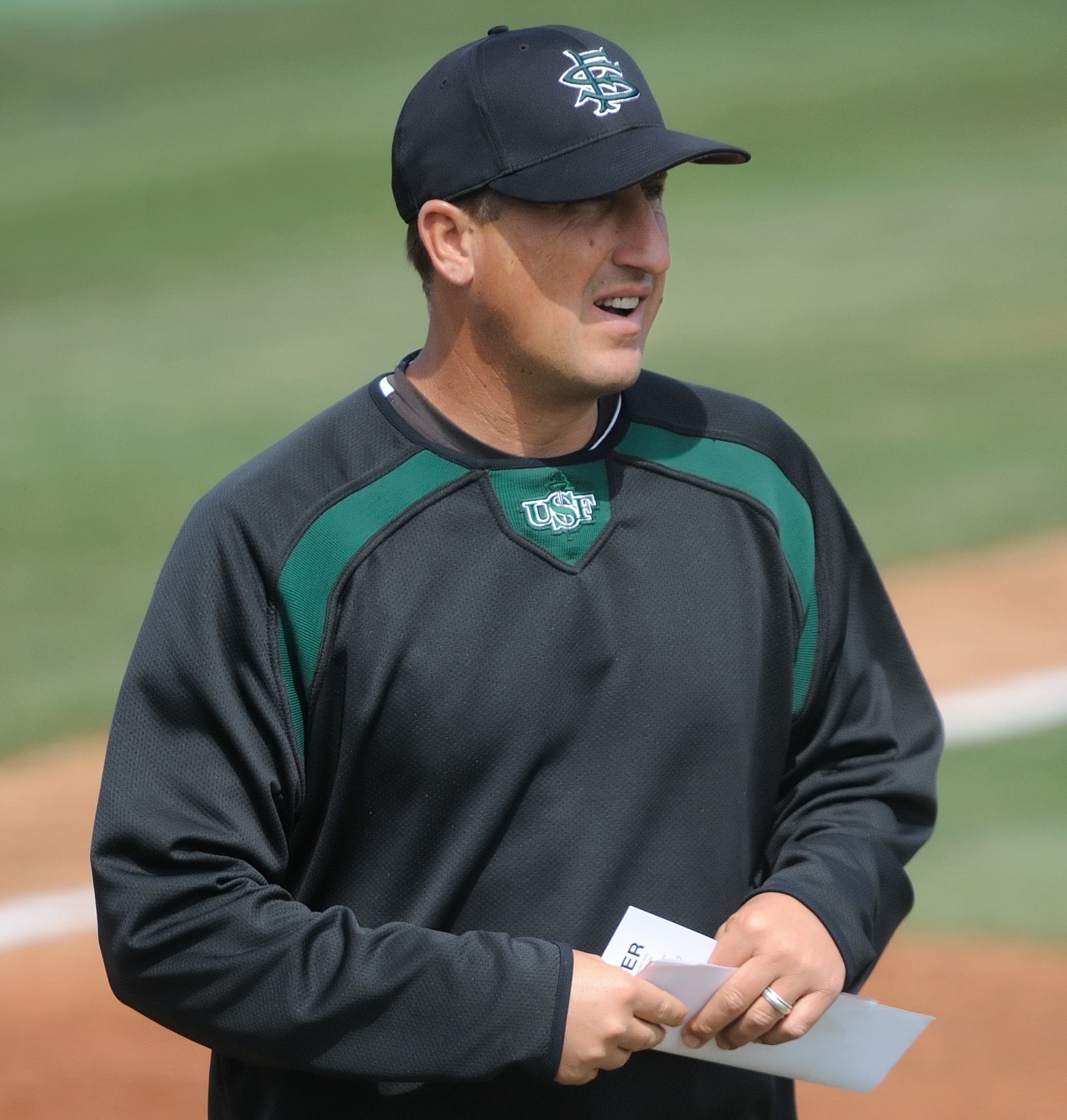
- Giarratano with San Francisco in 2009

Biographical details
- Born: June 2, 1962 (age 64); Pueblo, Colorado, U.S.
- Education: William Jewell College

Coaching career (HC unless noted)
- 1989–1994: Trinidad State JC
- 1995–1996: Yavapai
- 1997–1998: Arizona State (asst.)
- 1999–2022: San Francisco

Head coaching record
- Overall: 623–638–1 (.494)
- Tournaments: NCAA: 3–6 (.333)

Accomplishments and honors

Championships
- 2× WCC regular season (2006, 2011)

Awards
- 3× WCC Coach of the Year (2005, 2006, 2011)

Anthony "Nino" Giarratano (born June 2, 1962) is a former American college baseball coach, who served as head coach of the San Francisco Dons baseball team from 1999 to 2022.

In March 2022, Giarratano was fired by the University of San Francisco due to allegations that were later reflected in a class-action lawsuit that three former players filed accusing him of inappropriate sexual conduct .

== Early life and education ==
Born in Pueblo, Colorado, Giarratano attended Pueblo South High School and graduated in 1980. He then attended William Jewell College in Liberty, Missouri, earning a degree in physical education in 1985. He later added a master's degree from Adams State College in Alamosa, Colorado.

== Coaching career ==
In 1989, he began his coaching career at Trinidad State, a junior college in Trinidad, Colorado. In six seasons with the Trojans, Giarratano led teams to five NJCAA World Series. In 1994, Giarratano managed the Bourne Braves, a collegiate summer baseball team in the prestigious Cape Cod Baseball League. His Bourne team featured future major leaguers Jeremy Giambi and Mark Kotsay. He then spent two seasons at Yavapai College in Prescott, Arizona. He sent 25 of his players to professional contracts before becoming an assistant at Arizona State in 1997. Giarratano served as hitting instructor, offensive coordinator, and third base coach and helped lead the team to the 1998 College World Series final.

Giarratano moved to San Francisco to become head coach in 1999. In his time with the Dons, he has led teams to three NCAA Regionals, their only appearances in the Tournament in program history. The Dons have also claimed a pair of West Coast Conference championships and earned Giarratano WCC Coach of the Year honors three times. Giarratano is the program's all-time leader in wins.

== Sexual conduct scandal ==
On March 11, 2022, ESPN released an article titled Ex-San Francisco Dons baseball players sue Nino Giarratano, Troy Nakamura and others over alleged behavior alleging that head coach Giarratano and former assistant, Troy Nakamura oversaw an environment that "included persistent psychological abuse and repeated inappropriate sexual conduct."

Three former USF players, filed a class-action lawsuit against Giarratano and Troy Nakamura. Going by the alias "John Doe", the former players described varying forms of abuse. They described a culture in which "it was 'normal' to see [Nakamura] naked on the field or in a window, swinging his penis in a helicopter fashion while the entire team -- and [Giarratano] -- watched." "John Doe 1" alleged that Giarratano referred to him using several expletives and repeatedly berated him in an attempt to pressure him to leave the program (he had a significant four-year guaranteed scholarship). He entered the transfer portal in January. "John Doe 2" outlined a pattern of verbal and emotional abuse that resulted in five emergency room visits in the fall of 2021, contributing to his decision to leave the program. "John Doe 3" said Giarratano told him he was a waste of space, that none of his teammates or coaches liked him, and said, "I wish I could take my bat and hit your head as hard as I can, and maybe I can get your brain to work," according to the lawsuit. Another former USF baseball player, Tyler Imbach described having suicidal thoughts in a public Instagram post in September 2021 and told the San Francisco Chronicle : "The USF thing definitely compounded my mental health issues. USF was a rough experience, just the way I was treated by the coaching staff. It kind of sent me over the edge."

On March 13, 2022, Giarratano was fired immediately from USF. University of San Francisco Athletic Director, Joan McDermott stated, "When the university first became aware of the complaints by students and families about the environment and behavior of coaches in the baseball program, we immediately conducted an internal investigation that led to the firing of Troy Nakamura and an official reprimand of Nino Giarratano."

== Head coaching record ==
Record table
Season	Team	Overall	Conference	Standing	Postseason
San Francisco Dons (West Coast Conference) (1999–2022)
1999	San Francisco	21–34–1	11–18	4th (Coast)	
2000	San Francisco	26–33	10–20	4th (Coast)	
2001	San Francisco	28–26	14–16	3rd (Coast)	
2002	San Francisco	18–38	9–21	4th (West)	
2003	San Francisco	25–31	17–13	2nd (West)	
2004	San Francisco	27–32	14–16	3rd (West)	
2005	San Francisco	38–18	20–11	2nd (West)	
2006	San Francisco	39–23	15–6	T–1st	NCAA Regional
2007	San Francisco	27–28	9–12	4th	
2008	San Francisco	31–26	12–9	4th	
2009	San Francisco	28–28	12–9	4th	
2010	San Francisco	28–28	10–11	4th	
2011	San Francisco	32–25	16–5	1st	NCAA Regional
2012	San Francisco	29–30	14–10	5th	
2013	San Francisco	35–24	15–9	T–2nd	NCAA Regional
2014	San Francisco	25–29	11–16	8th	
2015	San Francisco	23–31	15–12	5th	
2016	San Francisco	22–34	14–13	5th	
2017	San Francisco	29–28	11–16	6th	
2018	San Francisco	28–30	15–12	T–3rd	
2019	San Francisco	30–26	15–12	T–4th	
2020	San Francisco	9–8	0–0		Season canceled due to COVID-19
2021	San Francisco	25–28	16–11	3rd	
2022	San Francisco	10–7	0–0	(fired)	
San Francisco:		623–638–1 (.494)	295–278 (.515)		
Total:		623–638–1 (.494)			
National champion Postseason invitational champion Conference regular season champion Conference regular season and conference tournament champion Division regular season champion Division regular season and conference tournament champion Conference tournament champion
