= 2011 Texas A&M Aggies baseball team =

American college baseball season

2011 Texas A&M Aggies baseball

College World Series, 0–2
- Conference: Big 12 Conference
- Record: 47–22 (19–8 Big 12)
- Head coach: Rob Childress (6th year)
- Assistant coaches: Justin Seely (3rd year); Mike Clement (3rd year)
- Home stadium: Olsen Field at Blue Bell Park

2011 Big 12 Conference baseball standings
	Conf.				Overall
Team	W		L	PCT	W		L	PCT
No. 7 Texas ‍†‍‍^{y}	19	–	8	.704	49	–	19	.721
No. 8 Texas A&M ‍†‍‡‍^{y}	19	–	8	.704	47	–	22	.681
Oklahoma ‍‍‍^{y}	14	–	11	.560	41	–	19	.683
Oklahoma State ‍‍‍^{y}	14	–	12	.538	35	–	25	.583
Baylor ‍‍‍^{y}	13	–	14	.481	31	–	28	.525
Kansas State ‍‍‍^{y}	12	–	14	.462	36	–	25	.590
Texas Tech ‍‍‍	12	–	15	.444	33	–	25	.569
Missouri ‍‍‍	11	–	15	.423	27	–	32	.458
Nebraska ‍‍‍	9	–	17	.346	30	–	25	.545
Kansas ‍‍‍	9	–	18	.333	26	–	30	.464
† – Conference champion ‡ – Tournament champion y – Invited to the NCAA tournament As of June 30, 2011; Rankings from Collegiate Baseball

The 2011 Texas A&M Aggies baseball team represented Texas A&M University in the 2011 NCAA Division I baseball season. The Aggies played their home games at Olsen Field at Blue Bell Park. The team was coached by Rob Childress in his 6th season at Texas A&M.

The Aggies reached the College World Series, but were eliminated by California.

== Personnel ==
=== Roster ===
2011 Texas A&M Aggies roster
Pitchers: 21 – Denny Clement – Sophomore; 28 – Ross Hales – Sophomore; 32 – Kyle Martin – Sophomore; 35 – Estevan Uriegas – Junior; 36 – Ross Stripling – Junior; 37 – Derrick Hadley – Freshman; 38 – Michael Wacha – Sophomore; 44 – Jason Freeman – Freshman	Catchers: 43 – Troy Stein – Freshman; Infielders: 4 – Charlie Curl – Freshman; 14 – Scott Arthur – Junior; 17 – Matt Juengel – Junior; 27 – Jacob House – Junior	Outfielders: 3 – Jace Statum – Freshman; 8 – Brandon Wood – Sophomore; 13 – Krey Bratsen – Freshman; 18 – Tyler Naquin – Sophomore

=== Coaches ===
2011 Texas A&M Aggies baseball coaching staff
- Rob Childress – Head coach – 6th year
- Andy Sawyers – Associate head coach – 2nd year
- Justin Seely – Assistant coach – 3rd year
- Mike Clement – Volunteer assistant coach − 2nd year

== Schedule ==
2011 Texas A&M Aggies baseball game log
Regular season

February
Date	Opponent	Site/stadium	Score	Win	Loss	Save	Attendance	Overall record	Big 12 Record
February 18	Le Moyne	Olsen Field at Blue Bell Park • College Station, TX	W 3–1	Stilson (1–0)	Tardiff (0–1)	Stripling (1)	5,106	1–0	
February 19	Le Moyne	Olsen Field at Blue Bell Park • College Station, TX	W 10–2	Wacha (1–0)	Nelson (0–1)	None	4,711	2–0	
February 20	Le Moyne	Olsen Field at Blue Bell Park • College Station, TX	W 14–0	Hales (1–0)	Zielinski (0–1)	None	3,140	3–0	
February 22	Prairie View A&M	Olsen Field at Blue Bell Park • College Station, TX	W 11–1	Mendoza (1–0)	Simmons (0–1)	None	2,830	4–0	
February 25	Gonzaga	Olsen Field at Blue Bell Park • College Station, TX	W 1–0^{11}	Stripling (1–0)	Hunter (0–1)	None	4,025	5–0	
February 26	Gonzaga	Olsen Field at Blue Bell Park • College Station, TX	W 4–2	Wacha (2–0)	Gonzales (0–2)	Stripling (2)	3,888	6–0	
February 27	Gonzaga	Olsen Field at Blue Bell Park • College Station, TX	L 3–6	Martin (1–0)	Hales (1–)	Moon (1)	2,955	6–1	

March
Date	Opponent	Site/stadium	Score	Win	Loss	Save	Attendance	Overall record	Big 12 Record
March 1	Texas–Pan American	Olsen Field at Blue Bell Park • College Station, TX	W 4–1	Fleece (1–0)	Delgado (1–1)	Stripling (3)	2,867	7–1	
March 2	Texas–Pan American	Olsen Field at Blue Bell Park • College Station, TX	L 7–0	Mendoza (2–0)	Plunk (1–1)	None	2,486	8–1	
March 4	Utah	Minute Maid Park • Houston, TX (Houston College Classic)	L 1–2	Anton (1–1)	Fleece (1–1)	Wagner (1)	5,398	8–2	
March 5	at #23 Rice	Minute Maid Park • Houston, TX (Houston College Classic)	L 0–1	Kubitza (1–1)	Wacha (2–1)	None	9,987	8–3	
March 6	at Houston	Minute Maid Park • Houston, TX (Houston College Classic)	W 11–4	Fleece (2–1)	Dempsay (0–2)	None	7,076	9–3	
March 8	Centenary	Olsen Field at Blue Bell Park • College Station, TX	W 21–3	Stripling (2–0)	Thompson (0–2)	None	2,853	10–3	
March 11	FIU	Olsen Field at Blue Bell Park • College Station, TX	W 6–5	Hinojosa (1–0)	Arboleya (1–1)	None	3,131	11–3	
March 12	FIU	Olsen Field at Blue Bell Park • College Station, TX	L 1–2	Garcia (1–0)	Stripling (2–1)	None	3,625	11–4	
March 13	FIU	Olsen Field at Blue Bell Park • College Station, TX	W 8–5	Martin (1–0)	Swatscheno (1–1)	Hinojosa (1)	3,278	12–4	
March 15	#17 Cal State Fullerton	Olsen Field at Blue Bell Park • College Station, TX	W (2–0)	Stripling (3–1)	Floethe (1–1)	Stilson (1)	4,403	13–4	
March 18	at #2 Oklahoma	L. Dale Mitchell Baseball Park • Norman, OK	L 0–1	Rocha (5–0)	Stilson (1–1)	Duke (1)	1,561	13–5	0–1
March 19	at #2 Oklahoma	L. Dale Mitchell Baseball Park • Norman, OK	W 11–1	Wacha (3–1)	Overton (3–1)	None	1,985	14–5	1–1
March 20	at #2 Oklahoma	L. Dale Mitchell Baseball Park • Norman, OK	W 5–2	Stripling (4–1)	Smith (2–2)	Hinojosa (2)	1,369	15–5	2–1
March 22	Stephen F. Austin	Olsen Field at Blue Bell Park • College Station, TX	W 7–5	Fleece (3–1)	Eubanks (1–1)	Hinojosa (3)	3,237	16–5	
March 25	Kansas	Olsen Field at Blue Bell Park • College Station, TX	W 2–1^{10}	Fleece (4–1)	Duncan (0–1)	None	4,765	17–5	3–1
March 26	Kansas	Olsen Field at Blue Bell Park • College Station, TX	W 11–1	Wacha (4–1)	Poppe (1–3)	None	4,303	18–5	4–1
March 27	Kansas	Olsen Field at Blue Bell Park • College Station, TX	W 3–1	Stripling (5–1)	Cox (0–2)	Hinojosa (4)	3,474	19–5	5–1
March 30	at Texas–Arlington	Clay Gould Ballpark • Arlington, TX	W 7–4^{10}	Fleece (5–1)	Boydston (1–1)	Hinojosa (5)	948	20–5	

April
Date	Opponent	Site/stadium	Score	Win	Loss	Save	Attendance	Overall record	Big 12 Record
April 1	at Kansas State	Tointon Family Stadium • Manhattan, KS	W 6–3	Stilson (2–1)	Hunter (2–2)	Hinojosa (6)	1,175	21–5	6–1
April 2	at Kansas State	Tointon Family Stadium • Manhattan, KS	W 4–3	Uriegas (1–0)	Marshall (2–3)	Honojosa (7)	1,389	22–5	7–1
April 3	at Kansas State	Tointon Family Stadium • Manhattan, KS	L 4–9	Moore (1–0)	Stripling (5–2)	Allen (8)	1,114	22–6	7–2
April 5	Houston	Olsen Field at Blue Bell Park • College Station, TX	L 2–3	Mannisto (2–1)	Parrent (0–1)	None	2,918	22–7	
April 8	at Texas Tech	Dan Law Field at Rip Griffin Park • Lubbock, TX	L 3–4^{12}	Neely (8–0)	Parrent (0–2)	None	3,881	22–8	7–3
April 9	at Texas Tech	Dan Law Field at Rip Griffin Park • Lubbock, TX	W 5–4	Parrent (1–2)	Fowler (1–1)	Hinojosa (8)	3,381	23–8	8–3
April 10	at Texas Tech	Dan Law Field at Rip Griffin Park • Lubbock, TX	W 14–8	Stripling (6–2)	Kilcrease (3–2)	None	3,086	24–8	9–3
April 12	at #26 Rice	Reckling Park • Houston, TX	L 0–2	Simms (1–1)	Parrent (1–3)	Cingrani (4)	4,785	24–9	
April 15	at Baylor	Baylor Ballpark • Waco, TX	W 5–1	Stilson (3–1)	Turley (2–2)	None	3,310	25–9	10–3
April 16	Baylor	Olsen Field at Blue Bell Park • College Station, TX	L 1–12	Blank (3–1)	Wacha (4–2)	Garner (3)	7,409	25–10	10–4
April 17	Baylor	Olsen Field at Blue Bell Park • College Station, TX	W 2–1	Stripling (7–2)	Verrett (3–4)	None	4,207	26–10	11–4
April 19	#10 TCU	Olsen Field at Blue Bell Park • College Station, TX	L 2–4	Mitchell (3–0)	Parrent (1–4)	Chricton (2)	5,253	26–11	
April 22	#15 Oklahoma State	Olsen Field at Blue Bell Park • College Station, TX	W 11–2	Stilson (4–1)	Strong (3–1)	None	4,214	27–11	12–4
April 23	#15 Oklahoma State	Olsen Field at Blue Bell Park • College Station, TX	W 5–1	Wacha (5–2)	McCurry (2–2)	None	5,443	28–11	13–4
April 24	#15 Oklahoma State	Olsen Field at Blue Bell Park • College Station, TX	W 8–1	Stripling (8–2)	Herrera (2–1)	None	2,786	29–11	14–4
April 26	Sam Houston State	Olsen Field at Blue Bell Park • College Station, TX	L 5–8^{12}	Shelton (6–0)	Mendoza (2–1)	None	3,560	29–12	
April 29	at Missouri	Taylor Stadium • Columbia, MO	L 9–10	McCormick (5–2)	Hinojosa (1–1)	None	648	29–13	14–5
April 30	at Missouri	Taylor Stadium • Columbia, MO	L 1–9	Stites (3–3)	Wacha (5–3)	None	1,176	29–14	14–6

May
Date	Opponent	Site/stadium	Score	Win	Loss	Save	Attendance	Overall record	Big 12 Record
May 1	at Missouri	Taylor Stadium • Columbia, MO	W 3–2^{7}	Stripling (9–2)	Ross (2–4)	None	500	30–14	15–6
May 3	at UTSA	Nelson W. Wolff Municipal Stadium • San Antonio, TX	L 2–3^{10}	Clarke (2–4)	Mendoza (2–2)	None	2,035	30–15	
May 5	Dallas Baptist	Olsen Field at Blue Bell Park • College Station, TX	W 4–2	Stilson (5–1)	Stafford (5–4)	Martin (1)	2,725	31–15	
May 6	Dallas Baptist	Olsen Field at Blue Bell Park • College Station, TX	L 10–14^{10}	Haney (4–2)	Martin (1–1)	None	3,494	31–16	
May 7	Dallas Baptist	Olsen Field at Blue Bell Park • College Station, TX	W 14–2	Stripling (10–2)	Staples (5–2)	None	3,828	32–16	
May 10	Texas State	Olsen Field at Blue Bell Park • College Station, TX	W 15–5	Mendoza (3–2)	Ballew (3–2)	None	3,088	33–16	
May 13	Nebraska	Olsen Field at Blue Bell Park • College Station, TX	W 7–3	Wacha (6–3)	Ehlers 91–3)	None	3,822	34–16	16–6
May 14	Nebraska	Olsen Field at Blue Bell Park • College Station, TX	W 5–2	Stripling (11–2)	Niederklein (7–3)	Fleece (1)	4,655	35–16	17–6
May 15	Nebraska	Olsen Field at Blue Bell Park • College Station, TX	W 5–1	Parrent (2–4)	Keller (2–6)	None	3,802	36–16	18–6
May 17	Texas–Arlington	Olsen Field at Blue Bell Park • College Station, TX	W 1–0	Hinojosa (2–1)	Morales (2–1)	Fleece (2)	2,785	37–16	
May 19	#6 Texas	Olsen Field at Blue Bell Park • College Station, TX	L 2–4	Jungmann (12–0)	Stilson (5–2)	None	7,082	37–17	18–7
May 20	at #6 Texas	UFCU Disch–Falk Field • Austin, TX	L 4–6	Milner (6–3)	Hinojosa (2–2)	Knebel (16)	7,785	37–18	18–8
May 21	at #6 Texas	UFCU Disch–Falk Field • Austin, TX	W 3–0	Stripling (12–2)	Knebel (2–2)	None	7,533	38–18	19–8

Postseason

Big 12 Tournament
Date	Opponent	Site/stadium	Score	Win	Loss	Save	Attendance	Overall record	B12T Record
May 25	Texas Tech	RedHawks Field • Oklahoma City, OK	W 10–5	Martin (1–0)	Paiz (3–5)	None	4,079	33–24	2–0
May 26	Kansas State	RedHawks Field • Oklahoma City, OK	W 4–1	Wacha (7–3)	Applegate (5–4)	Fleece (3)	4,192	40–18	1–0
May 28	Kansas State	RedHawks Field • Oklahoma City, OK	W 9–8^{11}	Martin (3–0)	Fasola (0–1)	None	4,574	41–18	3–0
May 29	Missouri	RedHawks Field • Oklahoma City, OK	W 10–9^{10}	Fleece (6–1)	Ross (3–5)	None	4,416	42–18	4–0

NCAA tournament: College Station Regional
Date	Opponent	Site/stadium	Score	Win	Loss	Save	Attendance	Overall record	NCAAT record
June 3	(4) Wright State	Olsen Field at Blue Bell Park • College Station, TX	W 11–0	Wacha (8–3)	Woytek (7–4)	None	4,896	43–18	1–0
June 4	(3) Seton Hall	Olsen Field at Blue Bell Park • College Station, TX	W 6–3	Stripling (13–2)	Dirocco (8–2)	None	5,358	44–18	2–0
June 5	#22 (2) Arizona	Olsen Field at Blue Bell Park • College Station, TX	L 4–7	Cunningham (1–0)	Martin (2–2)	None	4,853	44–19	2–1
June 7	#22 (2) Arizona	Olsen Field at Blue Bell Park • College Station, TX	W 3–0	Fleece (7–1)	Heyer (8–5)	Stripling (4)	4,517	45–19	3–1

NCAA tournament: Tallahassee Super Regional
Date	Opponent	Site/stadium	Score	Win	Loss	Save	Attendance	Overall record	NCAAT record
June 10	at #8 (5) Florida State	Mike Martin Field at Dick Howser Stadium • Tallahassee, FL	W 6–2	Stripling (14–2)	Gilmartin (12–2)	None	4,602	46–19	4–1
June 11	at #8 (5) Florida State	Mike Martin Field at Dick Howser Stadium • Tallahassee, FL	L 9–23	Sitz (4–2)	Hadley (0–1)	Waugh (2)	4,125	46–20	4–2
June 12	at #8 (5) Florida State	Mike Martin Field at Dick Howser Stadium • Tallahassee, FL	W 11–2	Wacha (9–3)	Scantling (3–3)	None	5,032	47–20	5–2

NCAA tournament: College World Series
Date	Opponent	Site/stadium	Score	Win	Loss	Save	Attendance	Overall record	CWS record
June 18	#4 South Carolina	TD Ameritrade Park • Omaha, NE	L 4–5	Price (6–3)	Martin (2–3)	None	23,395	47–21	0–1
June 20	#8 California	TD Ameritrade Park • Omaha, NE	L 3–7	Porter (6–0)	Wacha (9–4)	Flemer (6)	18,141	47–22	0–2

== Ranking movements ==
Ranking movements Legend: ██ Increase in ranking ██ Decrease in ranking
	Week																		
Poll	Pre	1	2	3	4	5	6	7	8	9	10	11	12	13	14	15	16	17	Final
Coaches'	13	13*	13	15	13	9	5	5	6	7	6	9	14	11	13	8			6
Baseball America	21	21	20	22	21	8	6	6	5	6	6	9	11	11	13	7			7
Collegiate Baseball^	8	8	9	14	11	6	5	7	8	8	8	9	12	11	13	6	6	6	8
NCBWA†	16	13	13	16	12	9	6	6	7	9	8	11	14	13	14	8		7	8

^ Collegiate Baseball ranked 40 teams in their preseason poll, but only ranked 30 teams weekly during the season.
† NCBWA ranks 30 teams in their preseason poll, but only ranks 25 teams weekly during the season.
* A new poll was not released for this week, so for comparison purposes, the previous week's ranking is inserted in this week's slot.
