= Michael Roth (baseball) =

American baseball player (born 1990)

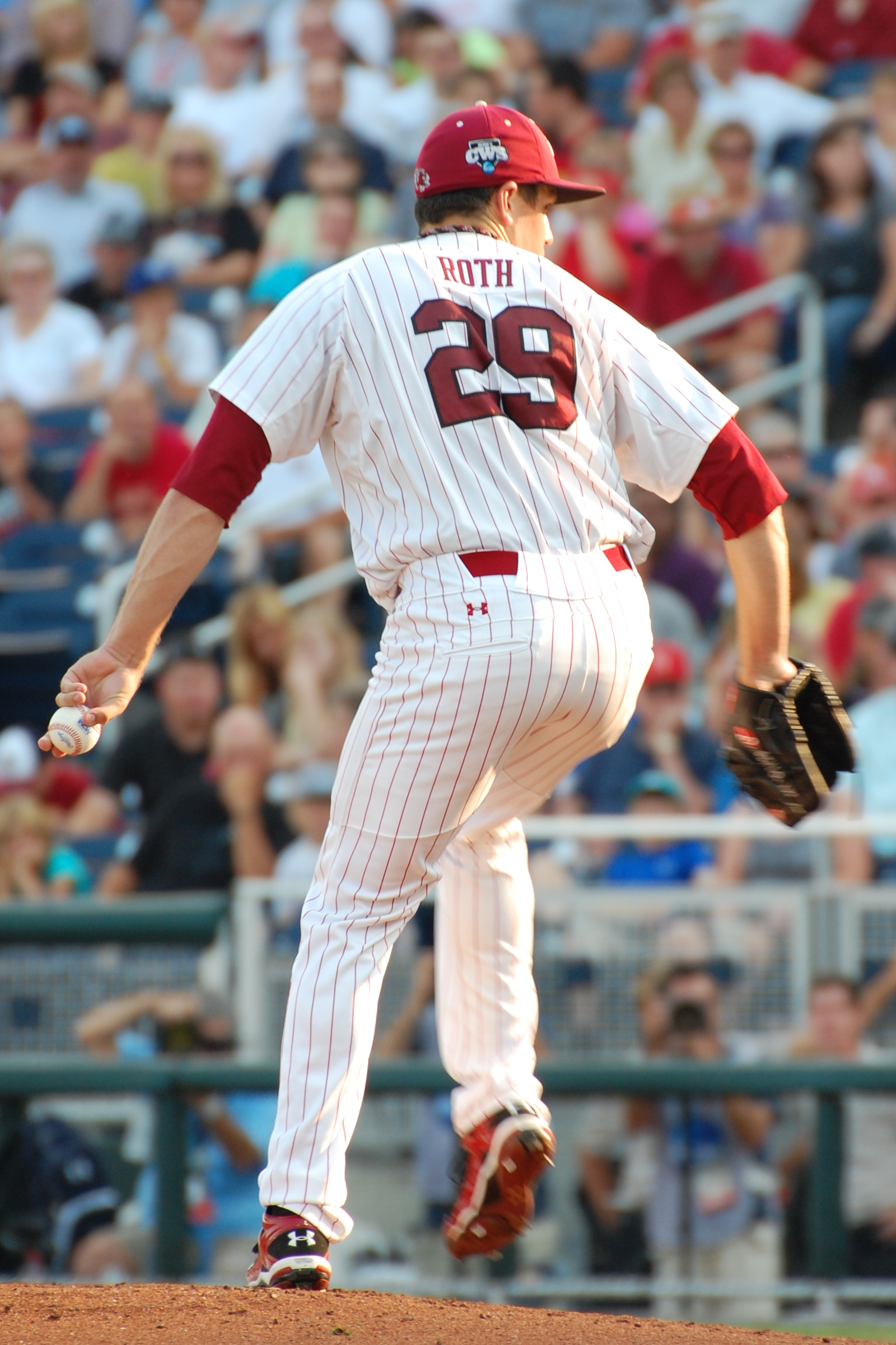
- Roth pitching in the 2012 College World Series
- Pitcher
- Born: February 15, 1990 (age 36); Greenville, South Carolina, U.S.
- Batted: Left Threw: Left

MLB debut
- April 13, 2013, for the Los Angeles Angels of Anaheim

Last MLB appearance
- July 4, 2016, for the Texas Rangers

MLB statistics
- Win–loss record: 2–1
- Earned run average: 8.50
- Strikeouts: 29
- Stats at Baseball Reference

Teams
- Los Angeles Angels of Anaheim (2013–2014); Texas Rangers (2016)

Michael Thomas Roth (born February 15, 1990) is an American former professional baseball pitcher. He played in Major League Baseball (MLB) for the Los Angeles Angels of Anaheim and Texas Rangers.

Before beginning his professional career, he played college baseball for the South Carolina Gamecocks at the University of South Carolina, where he was named a First Team All-American after the 2011 season. Roth also represented Great Britain internationally, including at the 2019 European Baseball Championship.

== Early life and college career ==
Roth attended Riverside High School in Greer, South Carolina. In addition to playing for the school's baseball team, Roth also played for the basketball team. As a baseball player, he was named a high school All-American in 2007 and to the Rawlings Preseason All-American Baseball Team in 2008.

Roth then enrolled at the University of South Carolina, where he played college baseball for the South Carolina Gamecocks baseball team in the Southeastern Conference (SEC) of the National Collegiate Athletic Association's (NCAA) Division I. Roth served as a left-handed specialist in the Gamecocks bullpen and also a reserve first baseman, before his first start at the College World Series in 2010 in the National Semifinal, with the Gamecocks in the repechage, playing in the Palmetto Derby, where the sophomore pitcher pitched a shutout to send the Tigers into the repechage. Roth then pitched the second game of the three-game national finals against UCLA, where despite a no-decision, the Gamecocks won the game and the 2010 College World Series (CWS). With only four starts to his name heading into the 2011 season, Roth compiled a 14–3 win–loss record and a 1.06 earned run average (ERA), with 112 strikeouts in 145 innings pitched across 21 games as a junior. Roth led all starting pitchers in NCAA's Division I in ERA in 2011, finishing second in the nation behind Cody Martin of Gonzaga University. The Gamecocks repeated as CWS champions in 2011, with Roth becoming the second pitcher to start in two CWS deciding games, following Michael Stutes in 2006 and 2007. Named to the CWS All-Tournament Team in 2011, Roth has pitched to a 1.17 ERA in five CWS starts. Roth was named a First Team All-American by Baseball America and a Third Team All-American by Louisville Slugger. He was also named a semifinalist for the Golden Spikes Award and CollegeBaseballInsider.com's National Player of the Year. He was also named to the 2012 Louisville Slugger Preseason All-American Team. Roth was named a Gamecocks' team captain for the 2011 and 2012 seasons.

The Cleveland Indians drafted Roth in the 31st round (938th overall) of the 2011 Major League Baseball draft. However, Roth chose almost immediately after the 2011 College World Series to return to school, and headed to Alicante (Spain) for a Study Abroad program as part of his International Business degree requirement, and did not sign with the Indians, opting to return to South Carolina for his senior season. Roth was named SEC Co-Pitcher of the Week on February 28, 2012.

== Professional career ==
=== Los Angeles Angels ===
The Los Angeles Angels of Anaheim drafted Roth in the 9th round (297th overall) of the 2012 Major League Baseball draft. He began his professional career in 2012 for the Orem Owlz in the Pioneer League.

Roth pitched for Great Britain in the 2013 World Baseball Classic Qualifiers. In his only game he pitched 3 1/3 innings, giving up four earned runs. Roth possesses dual citizenship with Great Britain and the United States due to his mother's English heritage.

Roth started the 2013 season with the Arkansas Travelers of the Double-A Texas League. He started, and won, their April 9 game against the Midland RockHounds. On April 13, 2013, with 27 innings of minor league experience, the Angels promoted Roth to the major leagues. Roth made his first major league appearance that evening against the Houston Astros, and pitched two innings of hitless, scoreless relief in the Angels' win.

Roth was designated for assignment by the Angels on April 27, 2014. He cleared waivers and was sent outright to Double-A Arkansas on May 1. He was called back up to the majors again on July 5. Roth was designated for assignment again on November 20. He cleared waivers and elected free agency on November 25.

=== Cleveland Indians ===
On January 6, 2015, Roth signed a minor league contract with the Cleveland Indians organization. On July 28, the Indians selected Roth's contract, adding him to their active roster. However, he did not appear for the team before being designated for assignment on August 5. Roth cleared waivers and was sent outright to the Triple-A Columbus Clippers on August 7. He elected free agency on October 5.

=== Texas Rangers ===
The Texas Rangers signed Roth to a minor league contract on February 22, 2016. He pitched for the Round Rock Express of the Triple-A Pacific Coast League. On July 3, the Rangers called up Roth from Triple-A after he posted an ERA under 3. He made his Rangers debut the next day, as a relief pitcher in a game against the Boston Red Sox. Roth was designated for assignment after he allowed six runs on 10 hits in 3 2/3 innings against Boston.

=== San Francisco Giants ===
On November 18, 2016, Roth signed a minor league contract with the San Francisco Giants. In 15 games (11 starts) for the Triple-A Sacramento River Cats, he logged a 4-4 record and 4.68 ERA with 42 strikeouts across 67 1/3 innings pitched. Roth was released by the Giants organization on July 2, 2017.

=== Tampa Bay Rays ===
On July 9, 2017, Roth signed a minor league contract with the Tampa Bay Rays organization. He made 10 appearances (9 starts) for the Triple–A Durham Bulls, recording a 5.08 ERA with 37 strikeouts in 44 1/3 innings pitched. He elected free agency following the season on November 6.

=== Chicago Cubs ===
On January 26, 2018, Roth signed a minor league contract with the Chicago Cubs. In 7 games (5 starts) for the Triple-A Iowa Cubs, he registered a 1-2 record and 3.03 ERA with 23 strikeouts over 29 2/3 innings of work.

=== Texas Rangers ===
On May 25, 2018, Roth was traded to the Texas Rangers and assigned to the Triple–A Round Rock Express. In 14 games (13 starts) for Round Rock, he posted a 5-5 record and 4.90 ERA with 38 strikeouts across 71 2/3 innings pitched. Roth was released by the Rangers organization on August 14.

On December 27, 2018, Roth announced his retirement from baseball.

== International career ==
Roth played for Team Great Britain in the 2019 European Baseball Championship and was selected to represent Great Britain at the 2023 World Baseball Classic qualification.

== Personal life ==
Roth's father worked as a car salesman, until he quit his job to watch his son pitch in the 2011 College World Series. Roth's mother, Deborah, is English.

Roth married Rachel Sanna on December 17, 2016 in Charleston, South Carolina.
