= Rob Childress =

American baseball player and coach (born 1968)

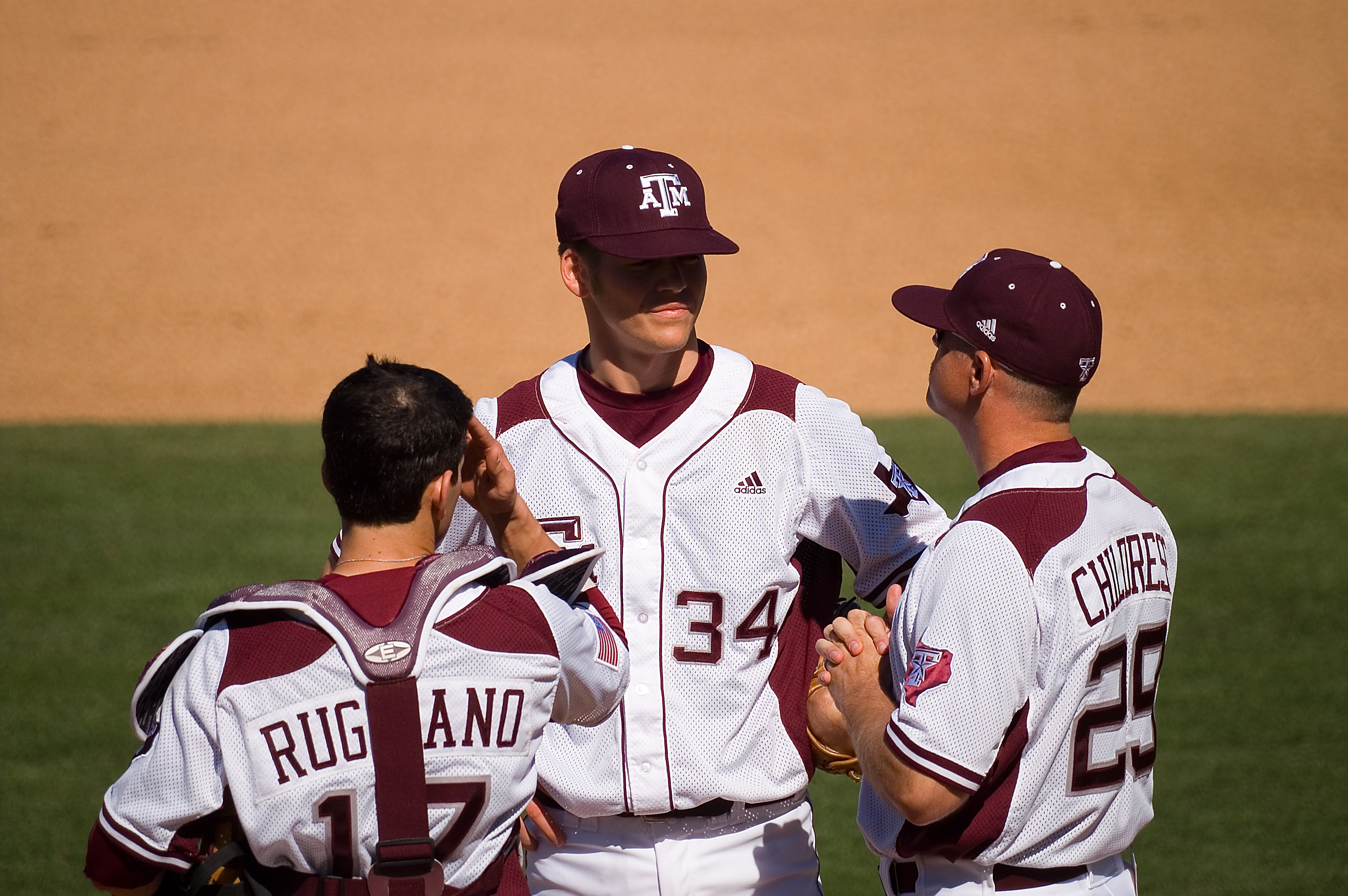
- Childress (right) talking to an Aggie player on February 24, 2008

Current position
- Title: Pitching coach
- Team: Nebraska
- Conference: Big Ten

Biographical details
- Born: September 26, 1968 (age 58); Gilmer, Texas, U.S.

Playing career
- 1987–1990: Northwood
- Position: Pitcher

Coaching career (HC unless noted)
- 1991–1992: Texarkana College (assistant)
- 1993: Northwood (assistant)
- 1994: Texarkana College
- 1995–1997: Northwestern State (assistant)
- 1998–2005: Nebraska (pitching)
- 2006–2021: Texas A&M
- 2023–present: Nebraska (pitching)

Administrative career (AD unless noted)
- 2021–2023: Nebraska (DoPD)

Head coaching record
- Overall: 665–346–3 (.657)

Accomplishments and honors

Championships
- Big 12 Conference (2008, 2011); Big 12 Conference tournament (2007, 2010, 2011); SEC tournament (2016)

Awards
- Big 12 Coach of the Year (2008, 2011)

Robert Alexander Childress (born September 26, 1968) is a baseball coach and former pitcher, who is the current pitching coach for the Nebraska Cornhuskers. He played college baseball at Northwood from 1987 to 1990. He then served as head coach of the Texas A&M Aggies (2006–2021).

== Playing career ==
Childress attended Harmony High School in Harmony, Texas. He was then recruited to Northwood University, where he would continue his athletic career as a pitcher, twice earning all-conference honors.

== Coaching career ==
=== Assistant coach ===
During his eight years as pitching coach with Nebraska (1998–2005), the Cornhuskers advanced to the NCAA tournament five times, reached the Super Regionals four times, and the College World Series three times. He helped construct the Nebraska pitching staff into one of the best in the nation, posting the top five single-season strikeout records in Nebraska history. His last season at Nebraska, his staff finished with an ERA of 2.69, ranking in the top five nationally and best in the Big 12.

Before joining the Nebraska staff, he served as pitching coach at Northwestern State University from 1995 to 1997.

=== Texas A&M ===
Childress was hired in 2005 by Texas A&M to be the head coach of the Aggie baseball team. His second season as head coach, Childress led the Aggies to a Big 12 Tournament championship and a trip to the NCAA Super Regionals. His team continued to improve in the 2008 season, as the Aggies won the Big 12 Championship and returned to the NCAA Super Regionals, earning Childress the Big 12 Coach of the Year award.

In his fourth season, however, the team began the season ranked #1 nationally in a few preseason polls, though were eliminated in regional play.

In 2011, Rob Childress led the Aggies to a Big 12 regular season co-championship and a Big 12 Tournament championship. The Aggies would advance through the NCAA Super Regionals against Florida State to advance to the College World Series.

Following a 2021 season that saw the Aggies finish in last place in the SEC, Athletics Director Ross Bjork, announced that the school would not renew Childress' contract for 2022. Childress's 622 victories ranked 3rd in school history at the time of his dismissal.

=== Return to Nebraska ===
After his dismissal from Texas A&M, Childress returned to Nebraska as Director of Player Development under head coach and his former player, Will Bolt, on July 11, 2021. Childress served as Director of Player Development for the 2022 and 2023 seasons. On June 9, 2023, following NU's dismissal of pitching coach Jeff Christy, Childress returned to his former role as pitching coach.

== Head coaching record ==
Record table
Season	Team	Overall	Conference	Standing	Postseason
Texarkana Bulldogs (NJCAA Region XIV) (1993–1994)
1994	Texarkana	43–10	–	–	
Texarkana:		43–10			
Texas A&M Aggies (Big 12 Conference) (2006–2012)
2006	Texas A&M	25–30–1	6–20–1	10th	
2007	Texas A&M	48–19	13–13	5th	NCAA Super Regional
2008	Texas A&M	46–19	19–8	1st	NCAA Super Regional
2009	Texas A&M	37–24	14–13	6th	NCAA Regional
2010	Texas A&M	43–21–1	14–12–1	4th	NCAA Regional
2011	Texas A&M	47–22	19–8	T–1st	College World Series
2012	Texas A&M	43–18	16–8	2nd	NCAA Regional
Texas A&M Aggies (Southeastern Conference) (2013–2021)
2013	Texas A&M	34–29	13–16	6th (West)	NCAA Regional
2014	Texas A&M	36–26	14–16	6th (West)	NCAA Regional
2015	Texas A&M	50–14	18–10	2nd (West)	NCAA Super Regional
2016	Texas A&M	49–16	20–10	2nd (West)	NCAA Super Regional
2017	Texas A&M	41–23	16–14	4th (West)	College World Series
2018	Texas A&M	40–22	13–17	6th (West)	NCAA Regional
2019	Texas A&M	39–23–1	16–13–1	4th (West)	NCAA Regional
2020	Texas A&M	15–3	0–0	(West)	Season canceled due to COVID-19
2021	Texas A&M	29–27	9–21	7th (West)	
Texas A&M:		622–336–3	222–201–3		
Total:		665–346–3 (.657)			
National champion Postseason invitational champion Conference regular season champion Conference regular season and conference tournament champion Division regular season champion Division regular season and conference tournament champion Conference tournament champion
