= Scott Wingo =

American baseball player and coach

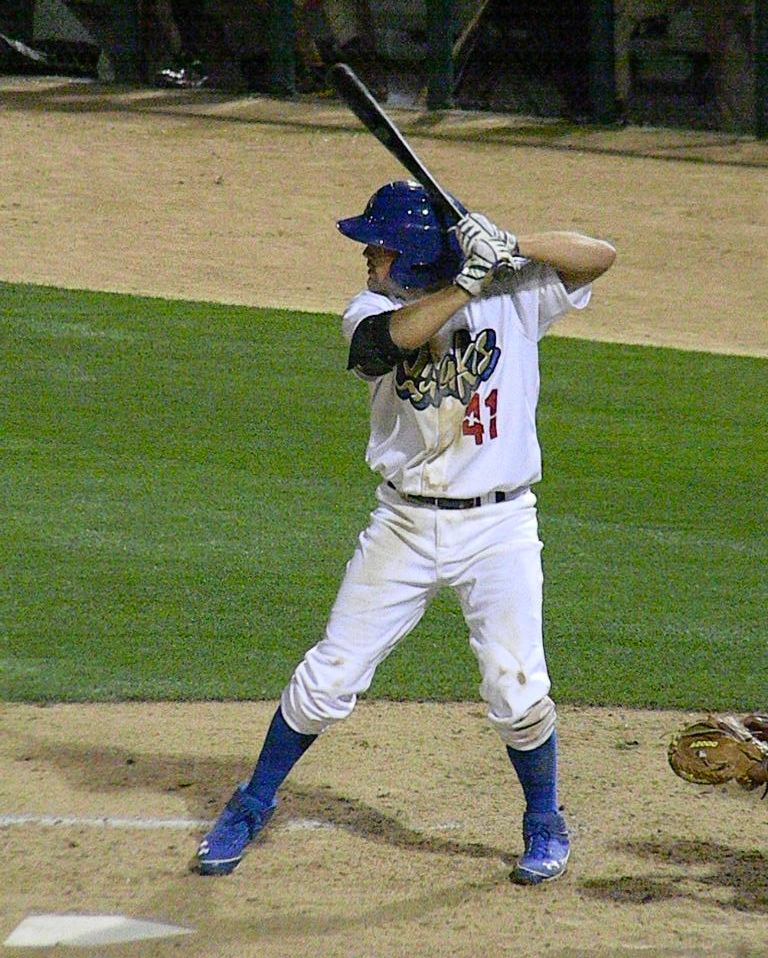

Current position
- Title: Assistant coach/Recruiting coordinator
- Team: Manhattan
- Conference: MAAC

Biographical details
- Born: March 25, 1989 (age 37); Greenville, South Carolina, U.S.

Playing career
- 2008–2011: South Carolina
- 2011: Arizona League Dodgers
- 2011: Ogden Raptors
- 2012–2014: Rancho Cucamonga Quakes
- 2014: Arizona League Dodgers
- Position: Second baseman

Coaching career (HC unless noted)
- 2015: South Carolina (GA)
- 2016–2017: North Greenville (Asst)
- 2018–2019: Jacksonville (IF/H)
- 2020–2021: Notre Dame (IF/H)
- 2022–2023: South Carolina (Asst)
- 2024–present: Manhattan (IF/H/RC)

Accomplishments and honors

Championships
- As player: 2x NCAA College World Series champion (2010, 2011)

Awards
- As player: College World Series Most Outstanding Player (2011)

David Scott Wingo (born March 25, 1989) is an American college baseball coach and former professional baseball second baseman. He is currently the recruiting coordinator for the Manhattan Jaspers. Wingo played college baseball at the University of South Carolina from 2008 to 2011 winning back to back NCAA College World Series titles in 2010 and 2011 under head coach Ray Tanner. He then pursued a professional career from 2011 to 2014.

== Playing career ==
Wingo attended Mauldin High School in Mauldin. He then attended the University of South Carolina, where he played for the South Carolina Gamecocks baseball team. He was named the College World Series Most Outstanding Player for the 2011 College World Series.

Wingo was drafted by the Dodgers in the 11th round (344th overall) in the 2011 Major League Baseball draft. He started his professional career with the Arizona League Dodgers but after 7 games was promoted to the Ogden Raptors of the Pioneer League. Combined, in 2011, he was in 38 games and hit .296.

Wingo spent his 2012 season with the Rancho Cucamonga Quakes in the California League. He played in 109 games with the Quakes and hit .246. He returned to the Quakes in 2013, and hit .227 in 101 games. Wingo spent 2013 with Rancho Cucamonga, where in 101 games, he hit .227/.371/.336 with 4 HR, 24 RBI and 50 BB. He played mostly second base, but also saw a considerable amount of time at third base.

He was released by the Dodgers on April 12, 2014.

== Coaching career ==
Wingo returned to the University of South Carolina as a student assistant and completed his degree in the spring of 2015. That summer, he coached in the Coastal Plain League. In 2016, he joined the North Greenville University baseball team as a graduate assistant and finished his master's degree. He served as an assistant coach at Jacksonville University during the 2018 season. He spent two seasons as a volunteer assistant coach at Notre Dame. In 2022, he returned to the University of South Carolina, where he served as a volunteer assistant coach. In 2023, he was named the director of program development at South Carolina. In 2025, he was an assistant coach at Manhattan University.
