= 2011 Texas Longhorns baseball team =

American college baseball season

2011 Texas Longhorns baseball

Big 12 Regular season champions Austin Regional champions Austin Super Regional champions

College World Series, 0–2
- Conference: Big 12 Conference

Ranking
- Coaches: No. 7
- CB: No. 7
- Record: 49–19 (19–8 Big 12)
- Head coach: Augie Garrido (15th year)
- Home stadium: UFCU Disch–Falk Field

2011 Big 12 Conference baseball standings
	Conf.				Overall
Team	W		L	PCT	W		L	PCT
No. 7 Texas ‍†‍‍^{y}	19	–	8	.704	49	–	19	.721
No. 8 Texas A&M ‍†‍‡‍^{y}	19	–	8	.704	47	–	22	.681
Oklahoma ‍‍‍^{y}	14	–	11	.560	41	–	19	.683
Oklahoma State ‍‍‍^{y}	14	–	12	.538	35	–	25	.583
Baylor ‍‍‍^{y}	13	–	14	.481	31	–	28	.525
Kansas State ‍‍‍^{y}	12	–	14	.462	36	–	25	.590
Texas Tech ‍‍‍	12	–	15	.444	33	–	25	.569
Missouri ‍‍‍	11	–	15	.423	27	–	32	.458
Nebraska ‍‍‍	9	–	17	.346	30	–	25	.545
Kansas ‍‍‍	9	–	18	.333	26	–	30	.464
† – Conference champion ‡ – Tournament champion y – Invited to the NCAA tournament As of June 30, 2011; Rankings from Collegiate Baseball

The 2011 Texas Longhorns baseball team represented the University of Texas at Austin in the 2011 NCAA Division I baseball season. The Longhorns played their home games at UFCU Disch-Falk Field. The team was coached by Augie Garrido in his 15th season at Texas.

The Longhorns reached the College World Series, but were eliminated by North Carolina.

== Personnel ==
=== Roster ===
2011 Texas Longhorns roster
Pitchers: 13 – Kirby Bellow – Freshman; 17 – Josh Urban – Sophomore; 19 – Sam Stafford – Junior; 24 – Cole Green – Senior; 26 – Taylor Jungmann – Junior; 27 – Keifer Nuncio – Sophomore; 28 – Austin Dicharry – Junior; 29 – Corey Knebel – Freshman; 32 – Kendal Carrillo – Senior; 34 – Stayton Thomas – Senior; 36 – Nathan Thornhill – Freshman; 41 – Hoby Milner – Sophomore; 47 – Clayton Crum – Freshman; 50 – Trevor Tekyl – Freshman; 57 – Andrew McKirahan – Junior	Catchers: 12 – Jacob Felts – Freshman; 39 – Lucas Kephart – Junior; 42 – Patrick Marsh – Sophomore; 46 – Hunter Wilcox – Junior; Infielders: 5 – Christian Summers – Freshman; 6 – Erich Weiss – Freshman; 7 – Jordan Etier – Junior; 9 – Tant Shepherd – Senior; 10 – Brandon Loy – Junior; 11 – Alex Silver – Freshman; 14 – Kevin Lusson – Junior; 30 – Ryan Ford – Freshman	Outfielders: 1 – Cohl Walla – Sophomore; 8 – Tim Maitland – Junior; 15 – Mark Payton – Freshman; 33 – Jonathan Walsh – Sophomore; 35 – Paul Montalbano – Senior; 37 – Dex Kjerstad – Freshman; 45 – Ben Kaplan – Senior

=== Coaches ===
2011 Texas Longhorns baseball coaching staff
- Augie Garrido – Head coach – 15th year
- Tommy Harmon – Associate head coach (Recruiting) – 22nd year
- Skip Johnson – Assistant coach (Pitching) – 5th year
- Travis Tucker – Assistant coach (Hitting) – 2nd year

== Schedule ==
2011 Texas Longhorns baseball game log
Regular season
February

Date	Opponent	Site/stadium	Score	Win	Loss	Save	Attendance	Overall record	Big 12 record
February 18	Maryland	UFCU Disch–Falk Field • Austin, TX	W 8–0	Jungmann (1–0)	Beck (0–1)	None	6,516	1–0	
February 19	Maryland	UFCU Disch–Falk Field • Austin, TX	L 1–10	Carroll (1–0)	Green (0–1)	None		1–1	
February 19	Maryland	UFCU Disch–Falk Field • Austin, TX	W 7–4	McKirahan (1–0)	Ghysels (0–1)	Thomas (1)	6,982	2–1	
February 20	Maryland	UFCU Disch–Falk Field • Austin, TX	W 16–0	Milner (1–0)	Kirkpatrick (0–1)	None	6,415	3–1	
February 22	Texas A&M–Corpus Christi	UFCU Disch–Falk Field • Austin, TX	L 7–8	Meza (2–0)	Nuncio (0–1)	Simko (1)	5,187	3–2	
February 25	@ Hawaii	Les Murakami Stadium • Honolulu, HI	W 2–0	Jungmann (2–0)	Sisto (0–1)	None	4,684	4–2	
February 26	@ Hawaii	Les Murakami Stadium • Honolulu, HI	L 4–5^{15}	Gallagher (1–0)	Knebel (0–1)	None	3,943	4–3	
February 27	@ Hawaii	Les Murakami Stadium • Honolulu, HI	W 4–3	Stafford (1–0)	Moore (0–1)	Nuncio (1)	3,705	5–3	

March

Date	Opponent	Site/stadium	Score	Win	Loss	Save	Attendance	Overall record	Big 12 record
March 4	#14 Stanford	UFCU Disch–Falk Field • Austin, TX	W 4–3	Jungmann (3–0)	Appel (0–2)	Knebel (1)	6,368	6–3	
March 5	#14 Stanford	UFCU Disch–Falk Field • Austin, TX	L 2–9	McArdle (2–0)	Green (0–2)	None	7,228	6–4	
March 6	#14 Stanford	UFCU Disch–Falk Field • Austin, TX	W 4–2	Stafford (2–0)	Pries (2–1)	Knebel (2)	6,666	7–4	
March 8	UTSA	UFCU Disch–Falk Field • Austin, TX	W 8–5^{11}	Knebel (1–1)	Clarke (0–1)	None	5,465	8–4	
March 11	Brown	UFCU Disch–Falk Field • Austin, TX	W 8–0	Jungmann (4–0)	Kimball (0–1)	None	6,026	9–4	
March 12	Brown	UFCU Disch–Falk Field • Austin, TX	W 4–3^{7}	Milner (2–0)	Carlow (0–2)	Knebel (3)		10–4	
March 12	Brown	UFCU Disch–Falk Field • Austin, TX	L 3–7	Galan (1–0)	Nuncio (0–2)	None	6,399	10–5	
March 13	Brown	UFCU Disch–Falk Field • Austin, TX	W 11–1^{7}	Green (1–2)	Whitehill (0–2)	None	5,670	11–5	
March 15	Texas State	UFCU Disch–Falk Field • Austin, TX	W 3–1	McKirahan (2–0)	Colon (1–2)	Knebel (4)	7,007	12–5	
March 18	Kansas State	UFCU Disch–Falk Field • Austin, TX	W 3–0	Jungmann (5–0)	Hunter (2–1)	Knebel (5)	6,758	13–5	1–0
March 19	Kansas State	UFCU Disch–Falk Field • Austin, TX	W 4–3^{10}	Knebel (2–1)	Allen (1–1)	None	6,824	14–5	2–0
March 20	Kansas State	UFCU Disch–Falk Field • Austin, TX	W 6–5^{14}	Carrillo (1–0)	Esquivel (0–1)	None	6,334	15–5	3–0
March 23	Houston Baptist	UFCU Disch–Falk Field • Austin, TX	W 12–0^{7}	Stafford (3–0)	Storey (0–4)	None	5,359	16–5	
March 25	@ Oklahoma State	Allie P. Reynolds Stadium • Stillwater, OK	W 1–0^{15}	Carrillo (2–0)	Marlowe (1–2)	None	1,159	17–5	4–0
March 26	@ Oklahoma State	Allie P. Reynolds Stadium • Stillwater, OK	L 1–3	Propst (4–1)	Milner (2–1)	None	864	17–6	4–1
March 27	@ Oklahoma State	Allie P. Reynolds Stadium • Stillwater, OK	L 3–10	McCurry (2–0)	Bellow (0–1)	None	352	17–7	4–2
March 29	Oral Roberts	UFCU Disch–Falk Field • Austin, TX	W 2–1	McKirahan (3–0)	Gonzalez (2–4)	Knebel (6)	5,435	18–7	

April

Date	Opponent	Site/stadium	Score	Win	Loss	Save	Attendance	Overall record	Big 12 record
April 1	Missouri	UFCU Disch–Falk Field • Austin, TX	W 5–4	JUngmann (6–0)	Emens (1–1)	Milner (1)	6,337	19–7	5–2
April 2	Missouri	UFCU Disch–Falk Field • Austin, TX	W 5–2	Milner (3–1)	Stites (1–2)	Knebel (7)	7,035	20–7	6–2
April 3	Missouri	UFCU Disch–Falk Field • Austin, TX	W 10–1	Green (2–2)	Hardoin (2–4)	None	6,505	21–7	7–2
April 5	@ Texas A&M–Corpus Christi	Whataburger Field • Corpus Christi, TX	W 8–1	Stafford (4–0)	Simko (5–4)	None	6,159	22–7	
April 8	@ Baylor	Baylor Ballpark • Waco, TX	W 11–3	Jungmann (7–0)	Verrett (3–3)	None	3,908	23–7	8–2
April 9	@ Baylor	Baylor Ballpark • Waco, TX	L 6–7	Turley (2–1)	Milner (3–2)	Garner (2)	3,771	23–8	8–3
April 10	Baylor	UFCU Disch–Falk Field • Austin, TX	W 5–2	Stafford (5–0)	Kuntz (0–1)	Knebel (8)	6,209	24–8	9–3
April 12	Dallas Baptist	UFCU Disch–Falk Field • Austin, TX	W 3–1	Thornill (1–0)	Stafford (3–3)	Knebel (9)	5,894	25–8	
April 15	Texas Tech	UFCU Disch–Falk Field • Austin, TX	W 4–1	Jungmann (8–0)	Paiz (3–2)	Knebel (10)	7,286	26–8	10–3
April 16	Texas Tech	UFCU Disch–Falk Field • Austin, TX	L 1–2	Masek (2–2)	Green (2–3)	Neely (5)	7,201	26–9	10–4
April 17	Texas Tech	UFCU Disch–Falk Field • Austin, TX	W 3–1	Milner (4–2)	Flora (0–3)	Knebel (11)	7,067	27–9	11–4
April 19	Texas–Pan American	UFCU Disch–Falk Field • Austin, TX	W 4–2	Carrillo (3–0)	Kotchie (1–3)	Knebel (12)	5,523	28–9	
April 21	@ Kansas	Hoglund Ballpark • Lawrence, KS	W 9–0	Jungmann (9–0)	Taylor (4–2)	None	901	29–9	12–4
April 22	@ Kansas	Hoglund Ballpark • Lawrence, KS	W 9–1	Green (3–3)	Walz (5–4)	None	1,306	30–9	13–4
April 23	@ Kansas	Hoglund Ballpark • Lawrence, KS	L 2–4	Poppe (2–4)	Stafford (5–1)	Murray (7)	1,620	30–10	13–5
April 26	Texas State	UFCU Disch–Falk Field • Austin, TX	W 2–0	Carrillo (4–0)	Colon (1–4)	Knebel (13)	6,636	31–10	
April 29	#15 Oklahoma	UFCU Disch–Falk Field • Austin, TX	W 5–0	Jungmann (10–0)	Rocha (8–2)	None	7,339	32–10	14–5
April 30	#15 Oklahoma	UFCU Disch–Falk Field • Austin, TX	W 4–3	Green (4–3)	Smith (7–3)	Knebel (14)	7,106	33–10	15–5

May

Date	Opponent	Site/stadium	Score	Win	Loss	Save	Attendance	Overall record	Big 12 record
May 1	#15 Oklahoma	UFCU Disch–Falk Field • Austin, TX	L 2–5	Overton (7–3)	Stafford (5–2)	None	6,777	33–11	15–6
May 3	Prairie View A&M	UFCU Disch–Falk Field • Austin, TX	W 8–0	Thornill (2–0)	Simmons (4–5)	None	5,713	34–11	
May 6	@ Nebraska	Haymarket Park • Lincoln, NE	W 5–3	Jungmann (11–0)	Freeman (5–5)	Knebel (15)	3,871	35–11	16–6
May 7	@ Nebraska	Haymarket Park • Lincoln, NE	W 16–5	Green (5–3)	Keller (2–5)	None	4,101	36–11	17–6
May 8	@ Nebraska	Haymarket Park • Lincoln, NE	L 3–6	Niederklein (7–2)	Milner (4–3)	Hauptman (8)	3,018	36–12	17–7
May 14	Texas Southern	UFCU Disch–Falk Field • Austin, TX	W 2–1^{11}	Milner (5–3)	Cook (0–2)	None		37–12	
May 14	Texas Southern	UFCU Disch–Falk Field • Austin, TX	W 11–0^{7}	Green (6–3)	Schulba (1–4)	None	7,685	38–12	
May 19	@ #11 Texas A&M	Olsen Field at Blue Bell Park • College Station, TX	W 4–2	Jungmann (12–0)	Stilson (5–2)	None	7,082	37–17	18–7
May 20	#11 Texas A&M	UFCU Disch–Falk Field • Austin, TX	W 6–4	Milner (6–3)	Hinojosa (2–2)	Knebel (16)	7,785	40–12	19–7
May 21	#11 Texas A&M	UFCU Disch–Falk Field • Austin, TX	L 0–3	Stripling (12–2)	Knebel (2–2)	None	7,533	40–13	19–8

Post-season
Big 12 Tournament

Date	Opponent	Site/stadium	Score	Win	Loss	Save	Attendance	Overall record	B12T record
May 25	(8) Missouri	RedHawks Field • Oklahoma City, OK	L 4–6	Anderson (3–0)	Carrillo (4–1)	McCormick (7)	3,810	40–14	0–1
May 26	(5) Baylor	RedHawks Field • Oklahoma City, OK	W 6–1	Jungmann (13–0)	Turley (3–5)	None	3,432	41–14	1–1
May 27	(4) Oklahoma State	RedHawks Field • Oklahoma City, OK	W 9–3	Green (7–3)	Heaney (7–4)	None	4,954	42–14	2–1
May 28	(8) Missouri	RedHawks Field • Oklahoma City, OK	W 6–1	Carrillo (5–1)	Stites (3–6)	None	4,257	43–14	3–1
May 28	(8) Missouri	RedHawks Field • Oklahoma City, OK	L 1–2	Fick (2–2)	Milner (6–4)	McCormick (8)	4,062	43–15	3–2

NCAA tournament: Austin Regional

Date	Opponent	Site/stadium	Score	Win	Loss	Save	Attendance	Overall record	NCAAT record
June 3	(4) Princeton	UFCU Disch–Falk Field • Austin, TX	W 5–3	Stafford (6–2)	Hermans (5–2)	Knebel (17)	6,110	44–15	1–0
June 4	#24 (3) Kent State	UFCU Disch–Falk Field • Austin, TX	L 5–7	Chafin (8–1)	Jungmann (13–1)	McMillen (18)	6,268	44–16	1–1
June 5	(2) Texas State	UFCU Disch–Falk Field • Austin, TX	W 4–3	Knebel (3–2)	McVaney (1–3)	None	5,178	45–16	2–1
June 5	#24 (3) Kent State	UFCU Disch–Falk Field • Austin, TX	W 9–3	Thornill (3–0)	Starn (9–3)	Carrillo (1–1)	5,601	46–16	3–1
June 6	#24 (3) Kent State	UFCU Disch–Falk Field • Austin, TX	W 5–0	Carrillo (6–1)	Mace (5–3)	None	5,917	47–16	4–1

NCAA tournament: Austin Super Regional

Date	Opponent	Site/stadium	Score	Win	Loss	Save	Attendance	Overall record	NCAAT record
June 10	#10 Arizona State	UFCU Disch–Falk Field • Austin, TX	L 1–3	Rodgers (9–4)	Jungmann (13–2)	Lambson (9)	7,235	47–17	4–2
June 11	#10 Arizona State	UFCU Disch–Falk Field • Austin, TX	W 5–1	Green (8–3)	Champlin (9–4)	Knebel (18)	7,278	48–17	5–2
June 12	#10 Arizona State	UFCU Disch–Falk Field • Austin, TX	W 4–2	Milner (7–4)	Lambson (7–4)	Knebel (19)	7,172	49–17	6–2

NCAA tournament: College World Series

Date	Opponent	Site/stadium	Score	Win	Loss	Save	Attendance	Overall record	CWS record
June 18	#1 (2) Florida	TD Ameritrade Park • Omaha, NE	L 4–8	Randall (11–3)	Jungmann (13–3)	Maronde (3)	25,521	49–18	0–1
June 20	#7 (3) North Carolina	TD Ameritrade Park • Omaha, NE	L 0–3	Emanuel (9–1)	Green (8–4)	None	19,630	49–19	0–2

== Ranking movements ==
Ranking movements Legend: ██ Increase in ranking ██ Decrease in ranking
	Week																		
Poll	Pre	1	2	3	4	5	6	7	8	9	10	11	12	13	14	15	16	17	Final
Coaches'	7	7*	12	13	10	6	7	8	7	4	5	5	4	5	4	5			7
Baseball America	6	6	6	5	5	5	8	8	6	7	7	6	5	5	2	5			6
Collegiate Baseball^	7	7	12	11	8	4	8	6	4	4	4	6	6	6	4	5	5	5	7
NCBWA†	6	7	12	12	10	5	8	8	5	4	4	5	4	4	3	5		5	7

^ Collegiate Baseball ranked 40 teams in their preseason poll, but only ranked 30 teams weekly during the season.
† NCBWA ranks 30 teams in their preseason poll, but only ranks 25 teams weekly during the season.
* A new poll was not released for this week, so for comparison purposes, the previous week's ranking is inserted in this week's slot.
