= 2011 Conference USA baseball tournament =

- Teams: 8
- Format: 2 division round robin and championship game
- Finals site: Trustmark Park; Pearl, MS
- Champions: Rice Owls (4th title)
- Winning coach: Wayne Graham (4th title)
- MVP: Tyler Duffey (Rice Owls)

2011 Conference USA baseball standings
	Conf.				Overall
Team	W		L	PCT	W		L	PCT
No. 24 Rice ‍†‍‡‍	16	–	8	.667	42	–	21	.667
Southern Miss ‍†‍‍	16	–	8	.667	39	–	19	.672
East Carolina ‍‍‍	14	–	10	.583	41	–	21	.661
UCF ‍‍‍	12	–	12	.500	39	–	23	.629
Memphis ‍‍‍	12	–	12	.500	30	–	27	.526
Houston ‍‍‍	12	–	12	.500	27	–	32	.458
Tulane ‍‍‍	10	–	14	.417	31	–	26	.544
UAB ‍‍‍	9	–	15	.375	29	–	28	.509
Marshall ‍‍‍	7	–	17	.292	20	–	31	.392
† – Conference champion ‡ – Tournament champion y – Invited to the 2011 NCAA Division I baseball tournament As of June 30, 2011; Rankings from Collegiate Baseball

The 2011 Conference USA baseball tournament was held at Trustmark Park in Pearl, Mississippi, from May 25 through 29, 2011. The winner received Conference USA's automatic bid to the 2011 NCAA Division I baseball tournament. The tournament consists of eight teams split into two four-team pods, with the teams with the best record in each pod going on to a single-game final.

== Regular season results ==
Team	W	L	Pct	GB	Seed
Rice	16	8	.667	--	1
Southern Miss	16	8	.667	0	2
East Carolina	14	10	.583	2	3
UCF	12	12	.500	4	4
Memphis	12	12	.500	4	5
Houston	12	12	.500	4	6
Tulane	10	14	.417	6	7
UAB	9	15	.375	7.5	8
Marshall	7	17	.202	9	--

- SMU, Tulsa, and UTEP do not field baseball teams. Marshall did not make the tournament.
- In the event of a tie, the team that won the series is designated the higher seed.

== Bracket ==
	Pod 1	Rice	UCF	MEM	UAB	Overall
1	Rice		W 4-2	W 8-5	L 8-9	2-1
4	UCF	L 2-4		W 16-9	W 6-4	2-1
5	Memphis	L 5-8	L 9-16		W 5-4	1-2
8	UAB	W 9-8	L 4-6	L 4-5		1-2

	Pod 2	USM	ECU	HOU	TUL	Overall
2	Southern Miss		L 0-4	L 6-7^{14}	W 6-1	1-2
3	East Carolina	W 4-0		L 5-8	W 4-2^{11}	2-1
6	Houston	W 7-6^{14}	W 8-5		L 1-7	2-1
7	Tulane	L 1-6	L 2-4^{11}	W 7-1		1-2

Finals
A	Rice	4^{10}
B	Houston	3

^{#} indicates the number of innings if not 9.

== Finish order ==
Finish	Team	W	L	Pct	Seed	RS	RA	Diff
1	^{†}Rice	3	1	0.750	1	20	16	4
2	Houston	2	2	0.500	6	16	18	-2
3	East Carolina	2	1	0.667	3	13	10	3
4	UCF	2	1	0.667	4	24	17	7
5	Southern Miss	1	2	0.333	2	12	12	0
6	Memphis	1	2	0.333	5	19	28	-9
7	Tulane	1	2	0.333	7	10	11	-1
8	UAB	1	2	0.333	8	17	19	-2

^{†} - Winner of the tournament and received an automatic bid to the NCAA tournament.
^{#} - Received an at-large bid to the NCAA tournament.

== All-Tournament Team ==
Position	Player	School
C	Craig Manuel	Rice
INF	Joseph Frost	UAB
INF	Jonathan Griffin	UCF
INF	Ryan Still	Houston
INF	Corey Thompson	East Carolina
OF	Landon Appling	Houston
OF	Ryan Lewis	Rice
OF	Caleb Ramsey	Houston
DH	D.J. Hicks	UCF
P	Tyler Duffey	Rice
P	Seth Maness	East Carolina
P	Todd McInnis	Southern Miss
P	Jared Ray	Houston
MVP	Tyler Duffey	Rice

(*)Denotes Unanimous Selection
