= 2011 NCAA Division I baseball tournament =

American college baseball championship

- Season: 2011
- Teams: 64
- Finals site: TD Ameritrade Park; Omaha, Nebraska
- Champions: South Carolina (2nd title)
- Runner-up: Florida (7th CWS Appearance)
- Winning coach: Ray Tanner (2nd title)
- MOP: Scott Wingo (South Carolina)

The 2011 NCAA Division I baseball tournament began on Friday, June 3, 2011 as part of the 2011 NCAA Division I baseball season. The 64 team double elimination tournament concluded with the 2011 College World Series in Omaha, Nebraska, on June 29, 2011. This was the first CWS at the new venue, TD Ameritrade Park, after closing Johnny Rosenblatt Stadium, which hosted the series since 1950.

The 64 NCAA Division I college baseball teams were selected out of an eligible 300 teams. Thirty teams were awarded an automatic bid as champions of their conferences, and 34 teams were selected at-large by the NCAA Division I Baseball Committee. The University of South Carolina won their second straight CWS championship after winning the final CWS championship at historic Rosenblatt stadium the previous year.

Through the 2025 tournament, this is the most recent one which did not include LSU, which won six national championships (1991, 1993, 1996, 1997, 2000, 2009) over the 20 previous seasons, and has added two (2023, 2025) since.

== Bids ==
=== Automatic bids ===
Conference champions from 30 Division I conferences earned automatic bids to regionals. The remaining 34 spots were awarded to schools as at-large invitees.

School	Conference	Record (Conf)	Berth	Last NCAA appearance
Alcorn State	SWAC	26–27 (19–4)	Won SWAC Tourney	First NCAA Appearance
Arkansas–Little Rock	Sun Belt	24–32 (10–20)	Won Sun Belt Tourney	First NCAA Appearance
Austin Peay State	OVC	33–22 (17–6)	Won OVC Tourney	2007 (Nashville Regional)
Belmont	Atlantic Sun	36–24 (17–13)	Won A-Sun Tourney	First NCAA Appearance
Bethune-Cookman	MEAC	35–22 (18–0)	Won MEAC Tourney	2010 (Gainesville Regional)
Cal State Fullerton	Big West	39–15 (18–5)	Regular season Champion	2010 (Los Angeles Super Regional)
Charlotte	Atlantic 10	42–14 (17–7)	Won A-10 Tourney	2008 (Raleigh Regional)
Coastal Carolina	Big South	41–18 (20–7)	Won Big South Tourney	2010 (Myrtle Beach Super Regional)
Creighton	Missouri Valley	44–14 (15–6)	Won MVC Tourney	2007 (Fayetteville Regional)
Florida	SEC	44–16 (22–8)	Won SEC Tourney	2010 (CWS 7th Place)
Fresno State	WAC	40–14 (17–7)	Won WAC Tourney	2009 (Irvine Regional)
Georgia Southern	Southern	35–24 (18–12)	Won SoCon Tourney	2009 (Fullerton Regional)
Illinois	Big Ten	28–25 (15–9)	Won Big Ten Tourney	2000 (Clemson Regional)
James Madison	Colonial Athletic	40–17 (21–9)	Won CAA Tourney	2008 (Raleigh Regional)
Kent State	Mid-American	43–15 (21–5)	Won MAC Tourney	2010 (Los Angeles Regional)
Maine	America East	32–22 (18–6)	Won AEC Tourney	2006 (Chapel Hill Regional)
Manhattan	MAAC	34–17 (20–2)	Won MAAC Tourney	2006 (Lincoln Regional)
Navy	Patriot	33–23–1 (12–8)	Won Patriot League Tourney	2002 (Winston-Salem Regional)
New Mexico	Mountain West	20–39 (10–14)	Won MWC Tourney	2010 (Fullerton Regional)
Oral Roberts	Summit	35–20 (21–7)	Won Summit Tourney	2010 (Norman Regional)
Princeton	Ivy	23–22 (15–5)	Won Championship series	2006 (Fayetteville Regional)
Rice	Conference USA	38–18 (16–8)	Won C-USA Tourney	2010 (Austin Regional)
Sacred Heart	Northeast	34–21 (23–9)	Won NEC Tourney	2006 (Athens Regional)
San Francisco	West Coast	31–23 (16–5)	Regular season Champion	2006 (Lincoln Regional)
Seton Hall	Big East	29–23 (14–13)	Won Big East Tourney	2001 (Clemson Regional)
Texas A&M	Big 12	42–18 (19–8)	Won Big 12 Tourney	2010 (Coral Gables Regional)
Texas State	Southland	40–21 (24–9)	Won Southland Tourney	2009 (Austin Regional)
UCLA	Pac-10	33–22 (18–9)	Regular season Champion	2010 (CWS Runner-up)
Virginia	Atlantic Coast	49–9 (22–8)	Won ACC Tourney	2010 (Charlottesville Regional)
Wright State	Horizon	35–17 (16–7)	Won Horizon Tourney	2009 (Fort Worth Regional)

=== By conference ===
Conference	Total	Schools
ACC	7	Clemson, Florida State, Georgia Tech, Miami (FL), North Carolina, NC State, Virginia
SEC	7	Alabama, Arkansas, Florida, Georgia, Mississippi State, South Carolina, Vanderbilt
Big 12	6	Baylor, Kansas State, Oklahoma, Oklahoma State, Texas, Texas A&M
Pac-10	6	Arizona, Arizona State, California, Oregon State, Stanford, UCLA
C-USA	4	UCF, East Carolina, Rice, Southern Miss
A-Sun	3	Belmont, Jacksonville, Stetson
Big East	3	Connecticut, Seton Hall, St. John's
Sun Belt	3	Arkansas–Little Rock, FIU, Troy
Big West	2	Cal State Fullerton, UC Irvine
Mountain West	2	New Mexico, TCU
A-10	1	Charlotte
America East	1	Maine
Big South	1	Coastal Carolina
Big Ten	1	Illinois
CAA	1	James Madison
Horizon	1	Wright State
Independent	1	Dallas Baptist
Ivy	1	Princeton
MAAC	1	Manhattan
MAC	1	Kent State
MEAC	1	Bethune–Cookman
MVC	1	Creighton
NEC	1	Sacred Heart
OVC	1	Austin Peay State
Patriot	1	Navy
SoCon	1	Georgia Southern
SLC	1	Texas State
SWAC	1	Alcorn State
Summit	1	Oral Roberts
WAC	1	Fresno State
WCC	1	San Francisco

== National seeds ==
Bold indicates CWS participant.

1. **Virginia**
2. **Florida**
3. **North Carolina**
4. **South Carolina**
5. Florida State
6. **Vanderbilt**
7. **Texas**
8. Rice

== Regionals & Super Regionals ==
Bold indicates winner. * indicates extra innings.

=== Charlottesville Super Regional ===
Regional	Regional
1	**Virginia**	**6**
4	Navy	0
1	**Virginia**	**10**
3	St. John's	2
3	**St. John's**	**2**
2	East Carolina	0
Charlottesville Regional - Davenport Field
4	Navy	1
2	**East Carolina**	**6**
2	**East Carolina**	**6**
3	St. John's	4
1	UCLA	0
4	**San Francisco**	**3**
4	San Francisco	3
3	**UC Irvine**	**4**
3	**UC Irvine**	**12**
2	Fresno State	6
Los Angeles Regional - Jackie Robinson Stadium
1	**UCLA**	**3**
2	Fresno State	1
1	**UCLA**	**4**
4	San Francisco	1

Regional Finals
1	**Virginia**	**13**	—
2	East Carolina	1	—
3	**UC Irvine**	**4**	—
1	UCLA	3	—

Super Regionals
1	**Virginia**	**6**	4	**3**
UC Irvine	0	**6**	2

=== Santa Clara Super Regional ===
Hosted by the University of California at Stephen Schott Stadium on the campus of Santa Clara University.**

Regional	Regional
1	**TCU**	**10**
4	Oral Roberts	2
1	TCU	2
3	**Dallas Baptist**	**3**
3	**Dallas Baptist**	**3**
2	Oklahoma	2
Fort Worth Regional - Lupton Stadium
4	**Oral Roberts**	**7**
2	Oklahoma	0
4	**Oral Roberts**	**8**
1	TCU	4
1	**Rice**	**14**
4	Alcorn State	2
1	Rice	2
2	**Baylor**	**3**
3	California	4
2	**Baylor**	**6**
Houston Regional - Reckling Park
4	Alcorn State	6
3	**California**	**10**
3	**California**	**6**
1	Rice	3

Regional Finals
3	**Dallas Baptist**	2	**11**
4	Oral Roberts	**7**	9
2	Baylor	0	8
3	**California**	**8**	**9**

Super Regionals
Dallas Baptist	0	2	—
**California**	**7**	**6**	—

**California hosted the super regional at Santa Clara because its own stadium (Evans Diamond) could not accommodate television crews and did not have lights.

=== Tallahassee Super Regional ===
Regional	Regional
1	**Florida State**	**6**
4	Bethune–Cookman	5
1	**Florida State**	**9**
3	Alabama	5
3	**Alabama**	**5**
2	UCF	3
Tallahassee Regional - Dick Howser Stadium
4	Bethune–Cookman	5
2	**UCF**	**16**
2	UCF	5
3	**Alabama**	**12**
1	**Texas A&M**	**11**
4	Wright State	0
1	**Texas A&M**	**6**
3	Seton Hall	3
3	**Seton Hall**	**4**
2	Arizona	0
College Station Regional - Olsen Field
4	Wright State	0
2	**Arizona**	**13**
2	**Arizona**	**6**
3	Seton Hall	0

Regional Finals
1	**Florida State**	**11**	—
3	Alabama	1	—
1	**Texas A&M**	4	**3**
2	Arizona	**7**	0

Super Regionals
5	Florida State	2	**23**	2
**Texas A&M**	**6**	9	**11**

=== Columbia Super Regional ===
Regional	Regional
1	**Clemson**	**11**
4	Sacred Heart	1
1	**Clemson**	**12**
3	Coastal Carolina	7
3	**Coastal Carolina**	**13**
2	Connecticut	1
Clemson Regional - Doug Kingsmore Stadium
4	Sacred Heart	3
2	**Connecticut**	**13**
2	**Connecticut**	**12**
3	Coastal Carolina	6
1	**South Carolina**	**2**
4	Georgia Southern	1
1	**South Carolina**	**11**
2	Stetson	5
3	NC State	7
2	**Stetson**	**8**
Columbia Regional - Carolina Stadium
4	Georgia Southern	2
3	**NC State**	**5**
3	NC State	3
2	**Stetson**	**5**

Regional Finals
1	Clemson	6	1
2	**Connecticut**	**7**	**14**
1	**South Carolina**	**8**	—
2	Stetson	2	—

Super Regionals
Connecticut	1	2	—
4	**South Carolina**	**5**	**8**	—

=== Gainesville Super Regional ===
Regional	Regional
1	**Florida**	**17**
4	Manhattan	3
1	**Florida**	**5**
2	Miami (FL)	4
3	Jacksonville	2
2	**Miami (FL)**	**7**
Gainesville Regional - Alfred A. McKethan Stadium
4	Manhattan	4
3	**Jacksonville**	**5**
3	Jacksonville	3
2	**Miami (FL)**	**6**
1	Georgia Tech	1
4	**Austin Peay State**	**2**
4	Austin Peay State	3
3	**Mississippi State**	**8**
3	**Mississippi State**	**3**
2	Southern Miss	0
Atlanta Regional - Russ Chandler Stadium
1	**Georgia Tech**	**6**
2	Southern Miss	2
1	**Georgia Tech**	**12**
4	Austin Peay State	2

Regional Finals
1	**Florida**	**11**	—
2	Miami (FL)	4	—
3	**Mississippi State**	**7**	—
1	Georgia Tech	3	—

Super Regionals
2	**Florida**	**11**	3	**8**
Mississippi State	1	**4**	6

=== Austin Super Regional ===
Regional	Regional
1	**Arizona State**	**4**
4	New Mexico	2
1	**Arizona State**	**16**
3	Charlotte	1
3	**Charlotte**	**3**
2	Arkansas	2
Tempe Regional - Packard Stadium
4	New Mexico	0
2	**Arkansas**	**3**
2	**Arkansas**	**11**
3	Charlotte	3
1	**Texas**	**5**
4	Princeton	3
1	Texas	5
3	**Kent State**	**7**
3	**Kent State**	**4**^{11}
2	Texas State	2
Austin Regional - UFCU Disch-Falk Field
4	Princeton	1
2	**Texas State**	**3**
2	Texas State	3
1	**Texas**	**4**

Regional Finals
1	**Arizona State**	**13**	—
2	Arkansas	4	—
3	Kent State	3	0
1	**Texas**	**9**	**5**

Super Regionals
Arizona State	**3**	1	2
7	**Texas**	1	**5**	**4**

=== Nashville Super Regional ===
Regional	Regional
1	**Vanderbilt**	**10**
4	Belmont	0
1	**Vanderbilt**	**10**
3	Troy	2
3	**Troy**	**9**
2	Oklahoma State	2
Nashville Regional - Hawkins Field
4	**Belmont**	**3**
2	Oklahoma State	2
4	**Belmont**	**5**
3	Troy	2
1	**Oregon State**	**7**
4	Arkansas–Little Rock	4
1	**Oregon State**	**5**
2	Creighton	1
3	Georgia	1
2	**Creighton**	**2**
Corvallis Regional - Goss Stadium at Coleman Field
4	Arkansas–Little Rock	3
3	**Georgia**	**7**
3	**Georgia**	**5***
2	Creighton	4*

Regional Finals
1	**Vanderbilt**	**6**	—
4	Belmont	1	—
1	**Oregon State**	**6**	—
3	Georgia	4	—

Super Regionals
6	**Vanderbilt**	**11**	**9**	—
Oregon State	1	3	—

=== Chapel Hill Super Regional ===
Regional	Regional
1	**North Carolina**	**4**
4	Maine	0
1	**North Carolina**	**14**
3	James Madison	0
3	**James Madison**	**11**
2	FIU	7
Chapel Hill Regional - Boshamer Stadium
4	**Maine**	**4**
2	FIU	1
4	Maine	2
3	**James Madison**	**5**
1	**Cal State Fullerton**	**10**
4	Illinois	4
1	Cal State Fullerton	0
2	**Stanford**	**1**
3	Kansas State	3
2	**Stanford**	**10**
Fullerton Regional - Goodwin Field
4	**Illinois**	**5**
3	Kansas State	3
4	**Illinois**	**7**
1	Cal State Fullerton	5

Regional Finals
1	**North Carolina**	**9**	—
3	James Madison	3	—
2	**Stanford**	**14**	—
4	Illinois	2	—

Super Regionals
3	**North Carolina**	**5**	**7**	—
Stanford	2	5	—

== College World Series ==
=== Participants ===
School	Conference	Record (conference)	Head coach	CWS appearances	Best CWS Finish	CWS record Not including this year
California	Pac-10	37–21 (13–13)	David Esquer	5 (last: 1992)	1st (1947, 1957)	10–6
Florida	SEC	50–17 (22–8)	Kevin O'Sullivan	6 (last: 2010)	2nd (2005)	8–13
North Carolina	ACC	50–14 (20–10)	Mike Fox	8 (last: 2009)	2nd (2006, 2007)	14–17
South Carolina	SEC	50–14 (22–8)	Ray Tanner	9 (last: 2010)	1st (2010)	23–17
Texas	Big 12	49–17 (19–8)	Augie Garrido	33 (last: 2009)	1st (1949, 1950, 1975, 1983, 2002, 2005)	82–55
Texas A&M	Big 12	47–20 (19–8)	Rob Childress	4 (last:1999)	5th (1993)	2–8
Vanderbilt	SEC	52–10 (22–8)	Tim Corbin	0 (last: none)	none	0–0
Virginia	ACC	54–10 (22–8)	Brian O'Connor	1 (last: 2009)	5th (2009)	1–2

=== Bracket ===
First round
1	**Virginia**	**4**
California	1
Texas A&M	4
4	**South Carolina**	**5**
**California**	**7**
Texas A&M	3
2	**Florida**	**8**
7	Texas	4
6	**Vanderbilt**	**7**
3	North Carolina	3
7	Texas	0
3	**North Carolina**	**3**

Second round
1	Virginia	1
4	**South Carolina**	**7**
California	1
1	**Virginia**	**8**
2	**Florida**	**3**
6	Vanderbilt	1
3	North Carolina	1
6	**Vanderbilt**	**5**

Semifinals
4	**South Carolina**	**3**^{13}	—
1	Virginia	2	—
2	**Florida**	**6**	—
6	Vanderbilt	4	—

Finals
4	**South Carolina**	**2**^{11}	**5**	—
2	Florida	1	2	—

=== Championship Series ===
==== Game 1 ====
Monday, June 27 7:00 pm Omaha, Nebraska ESPN
Team	1	2	3	4	5	6	7	8	9	10	11	R	H	E
**South Carolina**	0	0	0	0	0	0	0	1	0	0	1	**2**	**7**	**1**
Florida	0	0	1	0	0	0	0	0	0	0	0	**1**	**8**	**3**
Starting pitchers: USC: Forrest Koumas; UF: Hudson Randall; WP: John Taylor LP: Nick Maronde Sv: Matt Price; Home runs: USC: None; UF: None; Attendance: 25,851; Boxscore

==== Game 2 ====
Tuesday, June 28 7:00 pm Omaha, Nebraska ESPN
Team	1	2	3	4	5	6	7	8	9	R	H	E
Florida	0	0	0	1	0	0	0	1	0	**2**	**6**	**1**
**South Carolina**	0	0	3	0	0	1	0	1	X	**5**	**10**	**0**
Starting pitchers: FLA: Karsten Whitson; USC: Michael Roth; WP: Michael Roth LP: Karsten Whitson Sv: Matt Price; Home runs: FLA: Mike Zunino; USC: Peter Mooney; Attendance: 26,721; Notes: SC becomes the 6th team in CWS history to win back-to-back Championships. SC ties consecutive post season & CWS victories record, (see below). Boxscore

=== All-Tournament Team ===
The following players were members of the College World Series All-Tournament Team.

Position	Player	School
P	Matt Price	South Carolina
P	Michael Roth	South Carolina
1B	Christian Walker	South Carolina
2B	**Scott Wingo (MOP)**	South Carolina
3B	Cody Dent	Florida
SS	Peter Mooney	South Carolina
C	Robert Beary	South Carolina
OF	Tony Kemp	Vanderbilt
OF	Connor Harrell	Vanderbilt
OF	Bryson Smith	Florida
DH	Brady Thomas	South Carolina

== Final standings ==
Seeds listed below indicate national seeds only

Place	School	Record
1st	#4 South Carolina	10-0
2nd	#2 Florida	8-3
3rd	#6 Vanderbilt	7-2
3rd	#1 Virginia	7-3
5th	California	7-3
5th	#3 North Carolina	6-2
7th	#7 Texas	6-4
7th	Texas A&M	5-4
9th	Arizona State	4-2
9th	Connecticut	4-3
9th	Dallas Baptist	3-3
9th	#5 Florida State	4-2
9th	Mississippi State	4-2
9th	Oregon State	3-2
9th	Stanford	3-2
9th	UC Irvine	4-2
17th	Alabama	2-2
17th	Arizona	3-2
17th	Arkansas	2-2
17th	Baylor	2-2
17th	Belmont	2-2
17th	Clemson	2-2
17th	East Carolina	2-2
17th	Georgia	2-2
17th	Georgia Tech	2-2
17th	Illinois	2-2
17th	James Madison	2-2
17th	Kent State	2-2
17th	Miami (FL)	2-2
17th	Oral Roberts	3-2
17th	Stetson	2-2
17th	UCLA	2-2
33rd	Austin Peay	1-2
33rd	Cal State Fullerton	1-2
33rd	Central Florida	1-2
33rd	Charlotte	1-2
33rd	Coastal Carolina	1-2
33rd	Creighton	1-2
33rd	Jacksonville	1-2
33rd	Maine	1-2
33rd	NC State	1-2
33rd	#8 Rice	1-2
33rd	San Francisco	1-2
33rd	Seton Hall	1-2
33rd	St. John's	1-2
33rd	Texas State	1-2
33rd	TCU	1-2
33rd	Troy	1-2
49th	Alcorn State	0-2
49th	Arkansas–Little Rock	0-2
49th	Bethune-Cookman	0-2
49th	FIU	0-2
49th	Fresno State	0-2
49th	Georgia Southern	0-2
49th	Kansas State	0-2
49th	Manhattan	0-2
49th	Navy	0-2
49th	New Mexico	0-2
49th	Oklahoma	0-2
49th	Oklahoma State	0-2
49th	Princeton	0-2
49th	Sacred Heart	0-2
49th	Southern Miss	0-2
49th	Wright State	0-2

- # denotes national seed

== Record by conference ==
Conference	# of Bids	Record	Win %	RF	SR	WS	NS	CS	NC
Southeastern	7	35–13	.729	7	4	3	3	2	1
Atlantic Coast	7	24-15	.615	6	3	2	1	–	–
Big 12	6	13–16	.448	3	2	2	–	–	–
Pac-10	6	22–13	.629	6	4	1	–	–	–
Big East	3	6–7	.462	1	1	–	–	–	–
Big West	2	5–4	.556	1	1	–	–	–	–
Independent	1	3–3	.500	1	1	–	–	–	–
Atlantic Sun	3	5–6	.455	2	–	–	–	–	–
Conference USA	4	4–8	.333	1	–	–	–	–	–
Sun Belt	3	1–6	.143	–	–	–	–	–	–
Mountain West	2	1–4	.200	–	–	–	–	–	–
Other	20	16–40	.286	4	–	–	–	–	–

The columns RF, SR, WS, NS, CS, and NC respectively stand for the Regional Finals, Super Regionals, College World Series, National Semifinals, Championship Series, and National Champion.

== Tournament Notes ==
=== Round 1 ===
- 14 of 16 No. 1 seeds won their first round games, with Georgia Tech & UCLA being the only No. 1 seeds to lose.
- Only 5 of 16 No. 2 seeds won their first round games.

=== Round 2 ===
- 6 No. 1 seeds have been eliminated from the tournament. 3 prior to the regional finals: TCU, Cal State Fullerton, and No. 8 national seed Rice; with Georgia Tech, Clemson, and UCLA losing in the regional final

=== Regional Finals ===
- 6 non No. 1 seeds have won their regional and advanced to the Super Regionals: No. 3 UC Irvine, No. 3 Mississippi State, No. 3 Dallas Baptist, No. 3 California, No. 2 Stanford, and No. 2 Connecticut

=== Super Regionals ===
- In the context of almost being eliminated as a sponsored intercollegiate team by the University due to financial issues, the Cal Baseball team has advanced to the College World Series as a No. 3 seed.

=== College World Series ===
- Before the opening game of the CWS between Vanderbilt and North Carolina, the ceremonial first pitch was delivered by former President George W. Bush. Omaha Little Leaguer Henry Slagle had the honor of handing the ball to President Bush as his Memorial Park Little League team greeted the former president on the field. Before the pitch, his father, former president George H. W. Bush, who played for Yale in the first CWS in 1947, delivered a video message christening the new facility.
- This is the first CWS to feature eight schools from BCS automatic qualifying conferences. (3 SEC, 2 ACC, 2 Big 12, 1 Pac-10)
  - The 1987 event was the last with eight major football-playing schools. Florida State, which played baseball in the Metro Conference at the time, was an elite Independent in football, since the Metro did not sponsor football until the 1995 conference reunification.
- The SEC Eastern Division has three teams in the same CWS for the first time, South Carolina, Florida, Vanderbilt.
  - The SEC East qualified all three teams in these semi-finals, effectively taking the podium.
  - The SEC West qualified four of its six teams in 1997, including national champion LSU.
- Florida is making its first back-to-back trip to the College World Series in school history. South Carolina is also making a back-to-back CWS appearance, but for the fourth time, (1981–82, 2002, 03, 04 & 2010-11).
  - South Carolina is the first defending Champion to make it back to the CWS and defend its title since Oregon State did so in 2007.
- This is Vanderbilt's first trip to the College World Series in school history.
  - This now makes Kentucky the only SEC school to have never made it to the College World Series.
    - Both members added to the SEC in 2013, Texas A&M (which was in this tournament) and Missouri (six appearances, last in 1964), also previously made it to Omaha.
- This is the 19th consecutive year that the SEC has fielded at least one team in the College World Series.
- This is the 4th consecutive year that the SEC has fielded at least one team in the Championship Series.
  - * This is the second time that the SEC fielded two teams in the Championship Game, and with the last in 1997, LSU-Alabama 1997, representing the Western Division, this was the first to feature two Eastern Division opponents.
- The SEC was undefeated against out-of-conference opponents this CWS, going 6–0 in those games versus teams outside of the SEC.
- The Big 12 Conference went 0–4 this CWS.
- There have been 86 extra-inning games played in the history of the College World Series. By the end of this series, South Carolina had played in the past four.
- Three CWS Championship Series games have gone to 11 innings. By the end of this series South Carolina had played in the past two.
- For the first time in CWS history, the All-Tournament Team, including the Most Outstanding Player, was composed entirely of players from one conference, the SEC; more specifically the SEC Eastern Division. (South Carolina x 7, Florida x 2, Vanderbilt x 2).
- The South Carolina Gamecocks were the first team to go undefeated in the NCAA tournament since the Miami Hurricanes did so in 2001.
- With Game 2 Championship Series win South Carolina ties NCAA record for consecutive Post Season wins (Texas 1983-84) **15**.
- With Game 2 Championship Series win South Carolina ties NCAA record for consecutive College World Series wins (Southern California, LSU) **10**.
- South Carolina becomes the first team to win the CWS NCAA National Championship in the new TD Ameritrade Park Omaha. (South Carolina was also the last team to win the Championship in the old Johnny Rosenblatt Stadium.)
- South Carolina becomes the first team to win the CWS NCAA National Championship while using the new BBCOR (Batted Ball Coefficient of Restitution) Standard composite baseball bats that resulted in far less overall offensive production, nationally and across the board, during the 2011 college baseball season. The Gamecocks were also the first team to win the CWS while operating under the new "20-second pitch clock" rule. (South Carolina was also the last team to win the CWS in 2010 using the old metal bats and without a time limit imposed between pitches.)
- South Carolina becomes the sixth team in CWS history to win Back-to-Back NCAA D1 Baseball Championships. (Texas 1949-50, Southern California 1970-74, Stanford 1987-88, LSU 1996-97, Oregon State 2006-07. South Carolina 2010-11)
- This was the lowest-scoring College World Series in modern, (aluminum bat usage), history.

== Television coverage ==
=== Selection shows ===
The NCAA Division I Road to Omaha Selection Show Presented by Capital One aired on ESPN on May 30, 2011.

=== Competition ===
- Regionals:

The Fullerton and Gainesville Regionals were broadcast on ESPNU and ESPN3.com
The Corvallis and Fort Worth Regionals were broadcast on ESPN3.com
The Atlanta Regional was broadcast on CSS
The Tallahassee Regional was broadcast on Sun Sports and Fox Sports Florida

- Super Regionals: All games were broadcast on either ESPN, ESPN2, ESPNU, ESPN3.com, and ESPN Mobile
- CWS: Every game was broadcast on either ESPN or ESPN2.
