= 2011 Big 12 Conference baseball tournament =

American college baseball tournament

- Teams: 8
- Format: Two four team Double Elimination; Brackets with one game championship
- Finals site: RedHawks Ballpark; Oklahoma City, OK
- Champions: Texas A&M (3rd title)
- Winning coach: Rob Childress (3rd title)
- MVP: Andrew Collazo (Texas A&M)

2011 Big 12 Conference baseball standings
	Conf.				Overall
Team	W		L	PCT	W		L	PCT
No. 7 Texas ‍†‍‍^{y}	19	–	8	.704	49	–	19	.721
No. 8 Texas A&M ‍†‍‡‍^{y}	19	–	8	.704	47	–	22	.681
Oklahoma ‍‍‍^{y}	14	–	11	.560	41	–	19	.683
Oklahoma State ‍‍‍^{y}	14	–	12	.538	35	–	25	.583
Baylor ‍‍‍^{y}	13	–	14	.481	31	–	28	.525
Kansas State ‍‍‍^{y}	12	–	14	.462	36	–	25	.590
Texas Tech ‍‍‍	12	–	15	.444	33	–	25	.569
Missouri ‍‍‍	11	–	15	.423	27	–	32	.458
Nebraska ‍‍‍	9	–	17	.346	30	–	25	.545
Kansas ‍‍‍	9	–	18	.333	26	–	30	.464
† – Conference champion ‡ – Tournament champion y – Invited to the NCAA tournament As of June 30, 2011; Rankings from Collegiate Baseball

The 2011 Big 12 Conference baseball tournament was held at RedHawks Ballpark in Oklahoma City, OK from May 25 to May 29, 2011. After five years using the round robin tournament setup, the 2011 Big XII Tournament switched back to the format used from 1999 to 2005, which consisted of two separate four-team double-elimination tournaments. The winners of each of those tournaments faced each other in a one-game match for the championship. Missouri and Texas A&M faced each other in the championship game on Sunday, May 29, 2011. Texas A&M beat Missouri 10–9 in 10 innings to win the 2011 Big XII Tournament. As the conference tournament champion Texas A&M earned an automatic bid to the 2011 NCAA Division I baseball tournament. This was the second consecutive year that Texas A&M won the conference tournament in extra innings on a walk-off home run.

== Regular season standings ==
Place	Seed	Team	Conference				Overall		
Place	Seed	Team	W	L	%	GB	W	L	%
1	1	Texas	19	8	.704	–	49	19	.721
1	2	Texas A&M	19	8	.704	–	47	22	.681
3	3	Oklahoma	14	11	.560	4	41	19	.683
4	4	Oklahoma State	14	12	.538	4.5	35	25	.583
5	5	Baylor	13	14	.481	6	31	28	.525
6	6	Kansas State	12	14	.462	6.5	36	25	.590
7	7	Texas Tech	12	15	.444	7	33	25	.569
8	8	Missouri	11	15	.423	7.5	27	32	.458
9	–	Nebraska	9	17	.346	9.5	30	25	.545
10	–	Kansas	9	18	.333	10	26	30	.464

- Colorado and Iowa State did not sponsor baseball teams.

== Tournament ==
First round
5	Baylor	2
4	Oklahoma State	6
8	Missouri	6
1	Texas	4
5	Baylor	1
1	Texas	6
6	Kansas State	5
3	Oklahoma	4
7	Texas Tech	5
2	Texas A&M	10
7	Texas Tech	1
3	Oklahoma	3

Second round
4	Oklahoma State	5
8	Missouri	6
4	Oklahoma State	3
1	Texas	9
6	Kansas State	1
2	Texas A&M	4
6	Kansas State	4
3	Oklahoma	3

Semifinals
8	Missouri	1	2
1	Texas	6	1
2	Texas A&M	9*	X
6	Kansas State	8	X

Final
8	Missouri	9
2	Texas A&M	10*

- * indicates extra-inning game.
- Nebraska and Kansas did not make the tournament.

== All-Tournament Team ==
Position	Player	School
1B	Jacob House	Texas A&M
2B	Andrew Collazo	Texas A&M
3B	Brandon Loy	Texas
SS	Jason King	Kansas State
C	Kevin Gonzalez	Texas A&M
OF	Tyler Naquin	Texas A&M
OF	Conner Mach	Missouri
OF	Paul Montalbano	Texas
DH	Jonah Schmidt	Missouri
SP	Michael Wacha	Texas A&M
SP	Taylor Jungmann	Texas
RP	Kelly Fick	Missouri
MOP	Andrew Collazo	Texas A&M

== See also ==
- College World Series
- 2011 College World Series
- NCAA Division I Baseball Championship
- 2011 NCAA Division I baseball tournament
- Big 12 Conference baseball tournament
