= Manhattan Jaspers baseball =

- 2026 Manhattan Jaspers baseball team
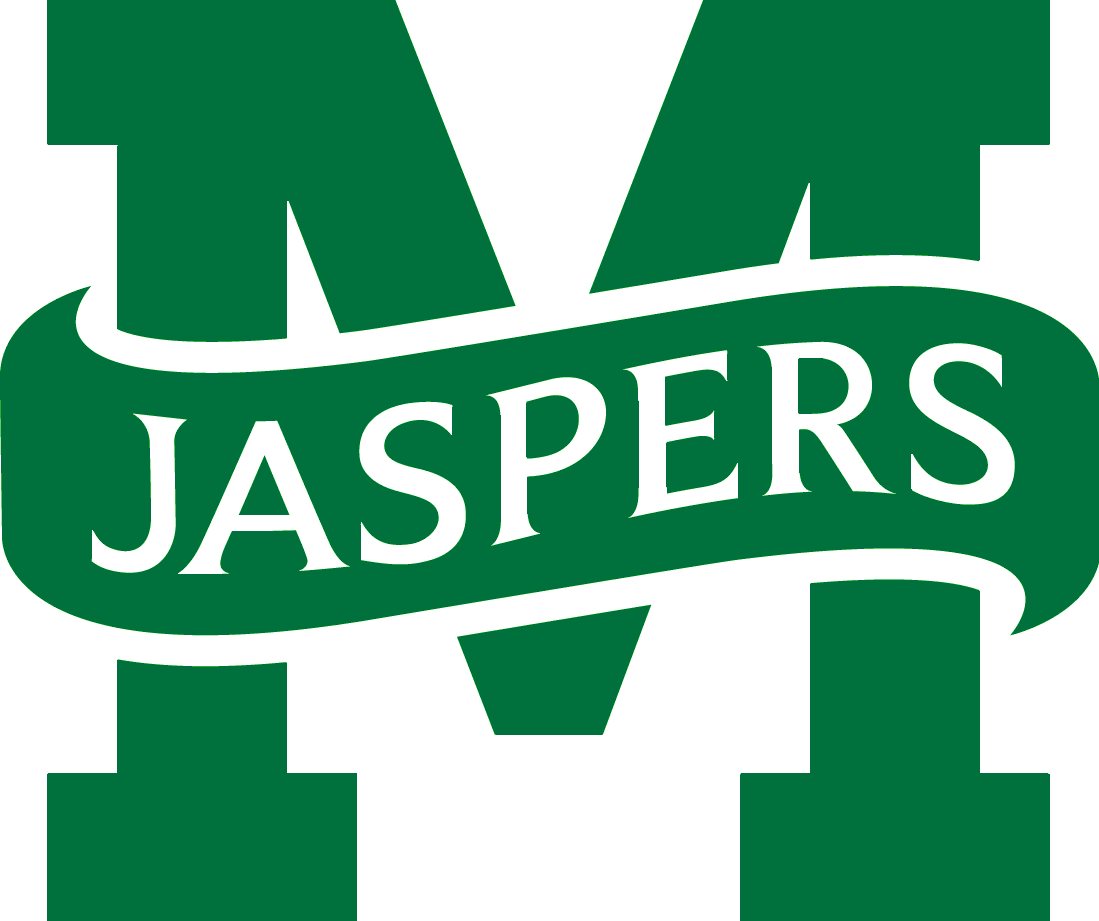
- University: Manhattan University
- Head coach: Steven Rosen (2nd season)
- Conference: MAAC
- Location: New York, New York
- Home stadium: Clover Stadium (capacity: 6,000)
- Nickname: Jaspers
- Colors: Green and white

NCAA tournament appearances
- 1957, 2006, 2011, 2012

Conference tournament champions
- MAAC: 2006, 2011, 2012

Conference regular season champions
- 2009, 2011, 2012

For information on all Manhattan University sports, see Manhattan Jaspers and Lady Jaspers

The Manhattan Jaspers baseball team is a varsity intercollegiate athletic team of Manhattan University in the Bronx, New York. The team is a member of the Metro Atlantic Athletic Conference, which is part of the National Collegiate Athletic Association's Division I. Its home venue is Clover Stadium, located in Pomona, New York, approximately 35 miles outside New York City. The Jaspers are led by head coach Steven Rosen.

== Venues ==
From 2015 to 2019, the Jaspers played its home games in Dutchess Stadium in Fishkill, New York. In 2020, the Jaspers announced that they would be returning to Van Cortlandt Park for all home games in 2021. By 2022, the Jaspers moved to Clover Stadium.

== NCAA tournament results ==
| Year | Record | Pct | Notes |
|---|---|---|---|
| 1957 | 0-1 | .000 | District 2 Semifinal |
| 2006 | 2-2 | .500 | Lincoln Regional |
| 2011 | 0-2 | .000 | Gainesville Regional |
| 2012 | 0-2 | .000 | Columbia Regional |

== Jaspers in the Major Leagues ==
| = All-Star | = Baseball Hall of Famer |

| Athlete | Years in MLB | MLB teams |
|---|---|---|
| Bill Finley | 1886 | New York Giants |
| Jack Taylor | 1891-1899 | New York Giants, Philadelphia Phillies, St. Louis Browns, Cincinnati Reds |
| Pete McBride | 1898-1899 | Cleveland Spiders, St. Louis Perfectos |
| Henry Thielman | 1902-1903 | New York Giants, Cincinnati Reds, Brooklyn Superbas |
| Lou Castro | 1902 | Philadelphia Athletics |
| Doc Scanlan | 1903-1907, 1909-1911 | Pittsburgh Pirates, Brooklyn Superbas/Dodgers |
| Cy Ferry | 1904-1905 | Detroit Tigers, Cleveland Naps |
| Jim Mullen | 1904-1905 | Philadelphia Athletics, Washington Senators |
| Jake Thielman | 1905-1908 | St. Louis Cardinals, Cleveland Naps, Boston Red Sox |
| Pat Duff | 1906 | Washington Senators |
| Tom O'Hara | 1906-1907 | St. Louis Cardinals |
| Eddie Zimmerman | 1906, 1911 | St. Louis Cardinals, Brooklyn Dodgers |
| Cotton Minahan | 1907 | Cincinnati Reds |
| Chris Mahoney | 1910 | Boston Red Sox |
| George Chalmers | 1910-1916 | Philadelphia Phillies |
| Dick Cotter | 1911-1912 | Philadelphia Phillies, Chicago Cubs |
| Jim Hanley | 1913 | New York Yankees |
| Charlie Meara | 1914 | New York Yankees |
| Nick Tremark | 1935-1937 | Brooklyn Dodgers |
| Buddy Hassett | 1936-1942 | Brooklyn Dodgers, Boston Bees/Braves, New York Yankees |
| Joe Gallagher | 1939-1940 | New York Yankees, St. Louis Browns, Brooklyn Dodgers |
| Andy Karl | 1943-1947 | Boston Red Sox, Philadelphia Phillies, Boston Braves |
| Xavier Rescigno | 1943-1945 | Pittsburgh Pirates |
| Chuck Schilling | 1961-1965 | Boston Red Sox |
| Bob Chlupsa | 1970-1971 | St. Louis Cardinals |
| Tom Waddell | 1984-1985, 1987 | Cleveland Indians |
| Mike Parisi | 2008 | St. Louis Cardinals |
| Joe Jacques | 2023 | Boston Red Sox |
| Tom Cosgrove | 2023 | San Diego Padres |

Taken from the Jaspers Baseball In The Pros.

== See also ==
- List of NCAA Division I baseball programs
