= Mid-Eastern Athletic Conference baseball tournament =

- Conference baseball championship
- Sport: Baseball
- Conference: Mid-Eastern Athletic Conference
- Number of teams: 4
- Format: double elimination
- Current stadium: Marty L. Miller Field
- Current location: Norfolk, Virginia
- Played: 1972–2022
- Last contest: 2022
- Current champion: Coppin State
- Most championships: Bethune-Cookman (19)
- Official website: Championship Central

The Mid-Eastern Athletic Conference baseball tournament was the conference baseball championship of the NCAA Division I Mid-Eastern Athletic Conference. In its final edition in 2022, all four MEAC baseball teams participated in the double elimination tournament at Marty L. Miller Field in Norfolk, Virginia. The winner of the tournament has received an automatic berth to the NCAA Division I Baseball Championship since automatic bid was granted beginning in 1999.

From 1999 until leaving the conference after the 2021 season, Bethune-Cookman had claimed all but six tournament championships, as North Carolina A&T won the 2005 and 2018 tournaments, Savannah State won the 2013 tournament, Florida A&M won the 2015 and 2019 events, while Norfolk State won in 2021. Coppin State won the last MEAC tournament in 2022.

The MEAC merged its baseball league into that of the Northeast Conference (NEC) after the 2022 season, by which time it had only four baseball-sponsoring members—two short of the minimum required for a conference to maintain its automatic tournament bid. The remaining MEAC baseball schools became NEC affiliates at that time.

== Champions ==
=== By year ===
The following is a list of conference champions and sites listed by year.

Year	Program	Site	Most Outstanding Performer	Outstanding Coach
1972	Howard			
1973	South Carolina State			
1974	North Carolina A&T			
1975	Howard			
1976	Howard			
1977	Howard			
1978–1983 No Conference Competition Sponsored
1984	Howard			
1985	Bethune-Cookman			
1986	Howard			
1987	Florida A&M			
1988	Florida A&M		Marquis Grissom, Florida A&M	
1989	Delaware State			
1990	Florida A&M			
1991	Florida A&M			
1992	Florida A&M			
1993	North Carolina A&T			
1994	Florida A&M	Moore-Kittles Field • Tallahassee, FL		
1995	Coppin State	Moore-Kittles Field • Tallahassee, FL		
1996	Bethune-Cookman	Moore-Kittles Field • Tallahassee, FL		
1997	Bethune-Cookman	Moore-Kittles Field • Tallahassee, FL		
1998	Howard University			
1999	Bethune-Cookman			
2000	Bethune-Cookman			
2001	Bethune-Cookman		Claudell Clark, Norfolk State	Mervyl Melendez, Bethune-Cookman
2002	Bethune-Cookman		Carlos Geathers, North Carolina A&T	Mervyl Melendez, Bethune-Cookman
2003	Bethune-Cookman		John Gragg, Bethune-Cookman	Mervyl Melendez, Bethune-Cookman
2004	Bethune-Cookman	Cracker Jack Stadium • Lake Buena Vista, FL	Jon Roberts, Bethune-Cookman	Mervyl Melendez, Bethune-Cookman
2005	North Carolina A&T	Cracker Jack Stadium • Lake Buena Vista, FL	Joe McIntyre, North Carolina A&T	Keith Shumate, North Carolina A&T
2006	Bethune-Cookman	Marty L. Miller Field • Norfolk, VA	Jose Rivera Ortiz, Bethune-Cookman	Mervyl Melendez, Bethune-Cookman
2007	Bethune-Cookman	Marty L. Miller Field • Norfolk, VA	Angel Mercado, Bethune-Cookman	Mervyl Melendez, Bethune-Cookman
2008	Bethune-Cookman	Marty L. Miller Field • Norfolk, VA	Jose Lozada, Bethune-Cookman	Mervyl Melendez, Bethune-Cookman
2009	Bethune-Cookman	Jackie Robinson Ballpark • Daytona Beach, FL	Marquis Riley, North Carolina A&T	Mervyl Melendez, Bethune-Cookman
2010	Bethune-Cookman	Jackie Robinson Ballpark • Daytona Beach, FL	DJ Leonard, Bethune-Cookman	Mervyl Melendez, Bethune-Cookman
2011	Bethune-Cookman	Jackie Robinson Ballpark • Daytona Beach, FL	Peter O'Brien, Bethune-Cookman	Mervyl Melendez, Bethune-Cookman
2012	Bethune-Cookman	Marty L. Miller Field • Norfolk, VA	David Lee, Bethune-Cookman	Jason Beverlin, Bethune-Cookman
2013	Savannah State	Marty L. Miller Field • Norfolk, VA	Kyle McGowin, Savannah State	Carlton Hardy, Savannah State
2014	Bethune-Cookman	Marty L. Miller Field • Norfolk, VA	Montana DuRapau, Bethune-Cookman	Jason Beverlin, Bethune-Cookman
2015	Florida A&M	Arthur W. Perdue Stadium • Salisbury, MD	Brandon Fleming, Florida A&M	Jamey Shouppe, Florida A&M
2016	Bethune-Cookman	Arthur W. Perdue Stadium • Salisbury, MD	Danny Rodriguez, Bethune-Cookman	Jason Beverlin, Bethune-Cookman
2017	Bethune-Cookman	Arthur W. Perdue Stadium • Salisbury, MD	Danny Rodriguez, Bethune-Cookman	Jason Beverlin, Bethune-Cookman
2018	North Carolina A&T	Sliwa Stadium • Daytona Beach, FL	Zach McLean, North Carolina A&T	Ben Hall, North Carolina A&T
2019	Florida A&M	Jackie Robinson Ballpark • Daytona Beach, FL	Kaycee Reese, Florida A&M	Jamey Shouppe, Florida A&M
2020	Canceled due to COVID-19			
2021	Norfolk State	Marty L. Miller Field • Norfolk, VA	Alsander Womack, Norfolk State	Keith Shumate, Norfolk State
2022	Coppin State	Marty L. Miller Field • Norfolk, VA	Brian Nicolas, Coppin State	Sherman Reed, Coppin State

=== By school ===
The following is a list of conference champions listed by school, since 1972.

Program	No. of titles	Title years
Bethune-Cookman	19	1985, 1996, 1997, 1999, 2000, 2001, 2002, 2003, 2004, 2006, 2007, 2008, 2009, 2010, 2011, 2012, 2014, 2016, 2017
Florida A&M	8	1987, 1988, 1990, 1991, 1992, 1994, 2015, 2019
Howard	7	1972, 1975, 1976, 1977, 1984, 1986, 1998
North Carolina A&T	4	1974, 1993, 2005, 2018
Coppin State	2	1995, 2022
Delaware State	1	1989
Norfolk State	1	2021
Savannah State	1	2013
South Carolina State	1	1973

Italics indicate the school stopped fielding a baseball team in the MEAC before the conference's final baseball season in 2022.
