= J. P. Blandin =

American baseball coach and pitcher

Biographical details
- Born: Middletown, Delaware, U.S.

Playing career
- 1990–1993: Wilmington (DE)
- Position: Pitcher

Coaching career (HC unless noted)
- 1994: Wilmington (DE) (GA)
- 1998: San Francisco (asst)
- 2000: Delaware State (asst)
- 2001–2024: Delaware State

Head coaching record
- Overall: 525–615–6
- Tournaments: NCAA: 0–0

Accomplishments and honors

Championships
- MEAC: 2022

Awards
- 2× MEAC Coach of the Year (2012, 2022)

Jean-Paul Blandin is an American baseball coach and former pitcher, who is the former head coach of the Delaware State Hornets.

== Playing career ==
Blandin attended St. Andrew's School in Middletown, Delaware. While at St. Andrew's, Blandin was named an all-state pitcher in 1988. Blandin then enrolled at Wilmington University, to play college baseball for the Wilmington Wildcats baseball team.

== Coaching career ==
Blandin became a graduate assistant at Wilmington in the fall of 1994. In 1998, Blandin served as the pitching coach at the University of San Francisco. Blandin then served as the pitching at Delaware State University in 2000.

Blandin was named the head coach at Delaware State in the fall of 2000. In 2012, Blandin was named the Mid-Eastern Athletic Conference (MEAC) Coach of the Year. On March 19, 2017, Blandin won his 400th game. Blandin announced on March 29, 2024, that he will retire at the end of the 2024 season.

== Head coaching record ==
Statistics overview
| Season | Team | Overall | Conference | Standing | Postseason |
|---|---|---|---|---|---|
Delaware State Hornets (Mid-Eastern Athletic Conference) (2001–2022)
| 2001 | Delaware State | 37–10 | 17–1 | 1st (North) | MEAC Tournament |
| 2002 | Delaware State | 40–19 | 16–1 | 1st (North) | MEAC Tournament |
| 2003 | Delaware State | 27–25 | 9–0 | 1st (North) | MEAC Tournament |
| 2004 | Delaware State | 27–23 | 11–6 | 2nd | MEAC Tournament |
| 2005 | Delaware State | 19–27 | 10–7 | 3rd | MEAC Tournament |
| 2006 | Delaware State | 18–36–2 | 7–11 | 5th | MEAC Tournament |
| 2007 | Delaware State | 22–27–2 | 10–8 | 4th | MEAC Tournament |
| 2008 | Delaware State | 16–33 | 11–7 | 4th | MEAC Tournament |
| 2009 | Delaware State | 19–25–1 | 10–8 | 2nd | MEAC Tournament |
| 2010 | Delaware State | 13–36 | 8–10 | 4th | MEAC Tournament |
| 2011 | Delaware State | 26–29 | 11–7 | 2nd | MEAC Tournament |
| 2012 | Delaware State | 40–17–1 | 22–2 | 1st (Northern) | MEAC Tournament |
| 2013 | Delaware State | 33–15 | 21–3 | 1st (Northern) | MEAC Tournament |
| 2014 | Delaware State | 30–17 | 17–7 | 1st (Northern) | MEAC Tournament |
| 2015 | Delaware State | 16–29 | 13–11 | 3rd (Northern) | MEAC Tournament |
| 2016 | Delaware State | 13–37 | 13–10 | 2nd (Northern) | MEAC Tournament |
| 2017 | Delaware State | 22–25 | 9–15 | 2nd (Northern) | MEAC Tournament |
| 2018 | Delaware State | 9–35 | 7–16 | 4th (Northern) | |
| 2019 | Delaware State | 20–25 | 12–12 | 3rd (Northern) | MEAC Tournament |
| 2020 | Delaware State | 3–12 | 0–0 | | Season canceled due to COVID-19 |
| 2021 | Delaware State | 15–28 | 15–27 | 2nd (North) | MEAC Tournament |
| 2022 | Delaware State | 25–23 | 19–14 | 1st | MEAC Tournament |
| Delaware State: | | | 268–183 | | |
Delaware State Hornets (Northeast Conference) (2023–2024)
| 2023 | Delaware State | 13–35 | 8–22 | 10th | |
| 2024 | Delaware State | 22–27 | 20–13 | 5th | NEC tournament |
| Delaware State: | | 525–615–6 | 28–35 | | |
| Total: | | 525–615–6 | | | |
National champion Postseason invitational champion Conference regular season champion Conference regular season and conference tournament champion Division regular season champion Division regular season and conference tournament champion Conference tournament champion

== See also ==
- List of current NCAA Division I baseball coaches
