= 2006 Mid-Eastern Athletic Conference baseball tournament =

- Teams: 6
- Format: Double-elimination tournament
- Finals site: Marty L. Miller Field; Norfolk, Virginia
- Champions: Bethune-Cookman (7th title)
- Winning coach: Mervyl Melendez (6th title)
- MVP: Jose Rivera Ortiz (Bethune-Cookman)

2006 Mid-Eastern Athletic Conference baseball standings
	Conf.				Overall
Team	W		L	PCT	W		L	PCT
Bethune-Cookman ‍†‍‡‍^{y}	15	–	0	1.000	30	–	27	.526
Norfolk State ‍‍‍	11	–	7	.611	23	–	28	.451
Coppin State ‍‍‍	7	–	8	.467	13	–	41	.241
Maryland Eastern Shore ‍‍‍	8	–	10	.444	17	–	34	.333
Delaware State ‍‍‍	7	–	11	.389	18	–	37	.327
North Carolina A&T ‍‍‍	6	–	12	.333	22	–	36	.379
Florida A&M ‍‍‍	6	–	12	.333	13	–	34	.277
† – Conference champion ‡ – Tournament champion y – Invited to the NCAA tournament As of June 25, 2006; Rankings from Collegiate Baseball

The 2006 Mid-Eastern Athletic Conference baseball tournament began on May 18 and ended on May 21 at Marty L. Miller Field, on the campus of Norfolk State University in Norfolk, Virginia. It was a six-team double elimination tournament. Bethune-Cookman won the tournament, as they have done each year but one since 1999. The Wildcats claimed the Mid-Eastern Athletic Conference's automatic bid to the 2006 NCAA Division I baseball tournament.

== Format and seeding ==
The top six finishers from the regular season were seeded one through six based on conference winning percentage only, with the top seed playing the sixth seed, second seed playing the fifth, and so on for first round matchups. The winners advanced in the winners' bracket, while first round losers played elimination games. The format meant that Florida A&M was left out of the field.

Team	W	L	Pct.	GB	Seed
Bethune-Cookman	15	0	1.000	—	1
Norfolk State	11	7	.611	5.5	2
Coppin State	7	8	.467	8	3
Maryland Eastern Shore	8	10	.444	8.5	4
Delaware State	7	11	.389	9.5	5
North Carolina A&T	6	12	.333	10.5	6
Florida A&M	6	12	.333	10.5	—

== Bracket and results ==
Bracket to be added

=== Game results ===
Date	Game	Winner	Score	Loser	Notes
May 18	Game 1	(1) Bethune-Cookman	9–5	(6) North Carolina A&T	
May 18	Game 2	(5) Delaware State	5–3	(2) Norfolk State	
May 18	Game 3	(4) Maryland Eastern Shore	14–6	(3) Coppin State	
May 19	Game 4	(6) North Carolina A&T	2–1	(2) Norfolk State	Norfolk State eliminated
May 19	Game 5	(3) Coppin State	5–4	(6) North Carolina A&T	North Carolina A&T eliminated
May 19	Game 6	(5) Delaware State	2–1	(4) Maryland Eastern Shore	
May 20	Game 7	(4) Maryland Eastern Shore	16–6	(3) Coppin State	Coppin State eliminated
May 20	Game 8	(1) Bethune-Cookman	12–0	(5) Delaware State	
May 20	Game 9	(4) Maryland Eastern Shore	5–0	(5) Delaware State	Delaware State eliminated
May 21	Game 10	(1) Bethune-Cookman	14–0	(4) Maryland Eastern Shore	Bethune-Cookman wins MEAC Championship

== All-Tournament Team ==
The following players were named to the All-Tournament Team.

Name	Team
Jose Almonte	Bethune-Cookman
Dustin Blackwell	Bethune-Cookman
Rob Caruso	Bethune-Cookman
Greg Cathell	Maryland Eastern Shore
Spencer Hill	Bethune-Cookman
Justin Hoban	Maryland Eastern Shore
Brad Powell	Maryland Eastern Shore
Ronald Quick	Maryland Eastern Shore
Jose Ortiz Rivera	Bethune-Cookman
Francisco Rodriguez	Bethune-Cookman
Morgan Schirmer	Maryland Eastern Shore

=== Outstanding Performer ===
Jose Rivera Ortiz was named Tournament Outstanding Performer. Ortiz was an outfielder for Bethune-Cookman.
