= 2009 Mid-Eastern Athletic Conference baseball tournament =

- Teams: 6
- Format: Double-elimination tournament
- Finals site: Jackie Robinson Ballpark; Daytona Beach, Florida
- Champions: Bethune-Cookman (10th title)
- Winning coach: Mervyl Melendez (9th title)
- MVP: Marquis Riley (North Carolina A&T)

2009 Mid-Eastern Athletic Conference baseball standings
	Conf.						Overall
Team	W		L		T	PCT	W		L		T	PCT
Bethune-Cookman ‍†‍‡‍^{y}	16	–	2	–	0	.889	32	–	28	–	0	.533
Florida A&M ‍‍‍	10	–	8	–	0	.556	24	–	30	–	1	.445
Delaware State ‍‍‍	10	–	8	–	0	.556	19	–	25	–	1	.433
Norfolk State ‍‍‍	9	–	9	–	0	.500	22	–	23	–	0	.489
North Carolina A&T ‍‍‍	9	–	9	–	0	.500	20	–	33	–	0	.377
Maryland Eastern Shore ‍‍‍	9	–	9	–	0	.500	14	–	42	–	0	.250
Coppin State ‍‍‍	0	–	18	–	0	.000	0	–	29	–	0	.000
† – Conference champion ‡ – Tournament champion y – Invited to the NCAA tournament As of June 1, 2009; Rankings from Collegiate Baseball

The 2009 Mid-Eastern Athletic Conference baseball tournament began on May 14 and ended on May 17 at Jackie Robinson Ballpark, on the campus of Bethune-Cookman University in Daytona Beach, Florida. It was a six-team double elimination tournament. Bethune-Cookman won the tournament, as they have done each year but one since the tournament began in 1999. The Wildcats claimed the Mid-Eastern Athletic Conference's automatic bid to the 2009 NCAA Division I baseball tournament.

== Format and seeding ==
The top six finishers from the regular season were seeded one through six based on conference winning percentage only, with the top seed playing the sixth seed, second seed playing the fifth, and so on for first round matchups. The winners advanced in the winners' bracket, while first round losers played elimination games. The format meant that Coppin State was left out of the field.

Team	W	L	Pct.	GB	Seed
Bethune-Cookman	16	2	.889	—	1
Delaware State	10	8	.556	6	2
Florida A&M	10	8	.556	6	3
Maryland Eastern Shore	9	9	.500	7	4
North Carolina A&T	9	9	.500	7	5
Norfolk State	9	9	.500	7	6
Coppin State	3	15	.167	15	—

== Bracket and results ==
Bracket to be added

=== Game results ===
Date	Game	Winner	Score	Loser	Notes
May 14	Game 1	(1) Bethune-Cookman	12–3	(6) Norfolk State	
May 14	Game 2	(5) North Carolina A&T	6–4	(2) Delaware State	
May 14	Game 3	(3) Florida A&M	12–2	(4) Maryland Eastern Shore	
May 15	Game 4	(6) Norfolk State	5–3	(2) Delaware State	Delaware State eliminated
May 15	Game 5	(5) North Carolina A&T	11–5	(3) Florida A&M	
May 15	Game 6	(6) Norfolk State	4–0	(4) Maryland Eastern Shore	Maryland Eastern Shore eliminated
May 16	Game 7	(3) Florida A&M	15–2	(6) Norfolk State	Norfolk State eliminated
May 16	Game 8	(1) Bethune-Cookman	16–1	(5) North Carolina A&T	
May 16	Game 9	(5) North Carolina A&T	10–3	(3) Florida A&M	Florida A&M eliminated
May 17	Game 10	(1) Bethune-Cookman	15–9	(5) North Carolina A&T	Bethune-Cookman wins MEAC Championship

== All-Tournament Team ==
The following players were named to the All-Tournament Team.

Name	Team
Hiram Burgos	Bethune-Cookman
Bryan Chaikowsky	Maryland Eastern Shore
Chase Davenport	Norfolk State
Russel Deutschmann	Maryland Eastern Shore
Darryl Evans	Florida A&M
Chris Fullman	Florida A&M
Juan Herrera	Norfolk State
George Hines	North Carolina A&T
CJ Lauriello	Bethune-Cookman
John Lynch	Norfolk State
Xavier Macklin	North Carolina A&T
Marquis Riley	North Carolina A&T
Tim Schalch	Florida A&M

=== Outstanding Performer ===
Marquis Riley was named Tournament Outstanding Performer. Riley was an infielder for North Carolina A&T.
