= 2008 Mid-Eastern Athletic Conference baseball tournament =

- Teams: 6
- Format: Double-elimination tournament
- Finals site: Marty L. Miller Field; Norfolk, Virginia
- Champions: Bethune-Cookman (9th title)
- Winning coach: Mervyl Melendez (8th title)
- MVP: Jose Lozada (Bethune-Cookman)

2008 Mid-Eastern Athletic Conference baseball standings
	Conf.				Overall
Team	W		L	PCT	W		L	PCT
Bethune-Cookman ‍†‍‡‍^{y}	17	–	1	.944	36	–	22	.621
North Carolina A&T ‍‍‍	11	–	6	.647	29	–	30	.492
Florida A&M ‍‍‍	11	–	7	.611	20	–	22	.476
Delaware State ‍‍‍	11	–	7	.611	16	–	33	.327
Norfolk State ‍‍‍	7	–	10	.412	25	–	24	.510
Maryland Eastern Shore ‍‍‍	4	–	12	.250	6	–	50	.107
Coppin State ‍‍‍	0	–	18	.000	4	–	52	.071
† – Conference champion ‡ – Tournament champion y – Invited to the NCAA tournament As of June 25, 2008; Rankings from Collegiate Baseball

The 2008 Mid-Eastern Athletic Conference baseball tournament began on May 15 and ended on May 17, 2008, at Marty L. Miller Field, on the campus of Norfolk State University in Norfolk, Virginia. It was a six-team double elimination tournament. Bethune-Cookman won the tournament, as they have done each year but one since the tournament began in 1999. The Wildcats claimed the Mid-Eastern Athletic Conference's automatic bid to the 2008 NCAA Division I baseball tournament.

== Format and seeding ==
The top six finishers from the regular season were seeded one through six based on conference winning percentage only, with the top seed playing the sixth seed, second seed playing the fifth, and so on for first round matchups. The winners advanced in the winners' bracket, while first round losers played elimination games. The format meant that Coppin State was left out of the field.

Team	W	L	Pct.	GB	Seed
Bethune-Cookman	17	1	.944	—	1
North Carolina A&T	11	6	.647	5.5	2
Florida A&M	11	7	.611	6	3
Delaware State	11	7	.611	7	4
Norfolk State	7	10	.412	9.5	5
Maryland Eastern Shore	4	12	.250	12	6
Coppin State	0	18	.000	17	—

== Bracket and results ==
Bracket to be added

=== Game results ===
Date	Game	Winner	Score	Loser	Notes
May 15	Game 1	(1) Bethune-Cookman	13–1	(6) Maryland Eastern Shore	
May 15	Game 2	(2) North Carolina A&T	4–2	(5) Norfolk State	
May 15	Game 3	(3) Florida A&M	7–6	(4) Delaware State	
May 16	Game 4	(5) Norfolk State	7–2	(6) Maryland Eastern Shore	Maryland Eastern Shore eliminated
May 16	Game 5	(2) North Carolina A&T	6–5	(3) Florida A&M	
May 16	Game 6	(5) Norfolk State	5–1	(4) Delaware State	Delaware State eliminated
May 17	Game 7	(5) Norfolk State	5–2	(3) Florida A&M	Florida A&M eliminated
May 17	Game 8	(1) Bethune-Cookman	3–2	(2) North Carolina A&T	
May 17	Game 9	(5) Norfolk State	10–5	(2) North Carolina A&T	North Carolina A&T eliminated
May 17	Game 10	(1) Bethune-Cookman	13–2	(5) Norfolk State	Bethune-Cookman wins MEAC championship

== All-Tournament Team ==
The following players were named to the All-Tournament Team.

Name	Team
Darryl Evans	Florida A&M
Jerrod Farley	Norfolk State
Marquis Frink	North Carolina A&T
Moriba George	Norfolk State
Jeremy Jones	North Carolina A&T
Chris Joyce	Norfolk State
Jose Lozada	Bethune-Cookman
Ryan Mailen	Delaware State
Joe McIntyre	North Carolina A&T
Ken Richardson	Maryland Eastern Shore
Nick Rogers	North Carolina A&T
Brad Stephenson	Norfolk State
Osvaldo Torres	Bethune-Cookman

=== Outstanding Performer ===
Jose Lozada was named Tournament Outstanding Performer. Lozada was an infielder for Bethune-Cookman.
