= 2004 Mid-Eastern Athletic Conference baseball tournament =

- Teams: 7
- Format: Double-elimination tournament
- Finals site: Cracker Jack Stadium; Lake Buena Vista, Florida
- Champions: Bethune-Cookman (6th title)
- Winning coach: Mervyl Melendez (5th title)
- MVP: Jon Roberts (Bethune-Cookman)

2004 Mid-Eastern Athletic Conference baseball standings
	Conf.				Overall
Team	W		L	PCT	W		L	PCT
Bethune-Cookman ‍†‍‡‍^{y}	14	–	4	.778	27	–	28	.491
Delaware State ‍‍‍	11	–	5	.688	27	–	22	.551
Florida A&M ‍‍‍	9	–	6	.600	22	–	30	.423
North Carolina A&T ‍‍‍	10	–	8	.556	23	–	26	.469
Norfolk State ‍‍‍	8	–	9	.471	17	–	30	.362
Coppin State ‍‍‍	8	–	10	.444	18	–	32	.360
Maryland Eastern Shore ‍‍‍	0	–	18	.000	3	–	43	.065
† – Conference champion ‡ – Tournament champion y – Invited to the NCAA tournament As of June 25, 2004; Rankings from Collegiate Baseball

The 2004 Mid-Eastern Athletic Conference baseball tournament began on April 29 and ended on May 2 at Cracker Jack Stadium, on the campus of in Lake Buena Vista, Florida. It was a seven-team double elimination tournament. Bethune-Cookman won the tournament, as they had done each year since 1999. The Wildcats claimed the Mid-Eastern Athletic Conference's automatic bid to the 2004 NCAA Division I baseball tournament.

== Format and seeding ==
The teams were seeded one through seven based on conference winning percentage only, with the top seed receiving a single bye while the second seed played the seventh seed, third seed played the sixth, and so on for first round matchups. The winners advanced in the winners' bracket, while first round losers played elimination games.

Team	W	L	Pct.	GB	Seed
Bethune-Cookman	14	4	.778	—	1
Delaware State	11	5	.688	2	2
Florida A&M	9	6	.600	3.5	3
North Carolina A&T	10	8	.556	4	4
Norfolk State	8	9	.471	5.5	5
Coppin State	8	10	.444	6	6
Maryland Eastern Shore	0	18	.000	14	7

== Bracket and results ==
Upper round 1	Upper round 2	Upper final	Final
1	Bethune-Cookman	9
5	Norfolk State	0
4	North Carolina A&T	4
5	Norfolk State	8
1	Bethune-Cookman	7
2	Delaware State	3
3	Florida A&M	7
6	Coppin State	2
3	Florida A&M	0
2	Delaware State	12
2	Delaware State	21
7	Maryland Eastern Shore	0
1	Bethune-Cookman	3	7
2	Delaware State	4	4
Lower round 1	Lower round 2	Lower round 3	Lower final
5	Norfolk State	7
6	Coppin State	3	6	Coppin State	2	2	Delaware State	5
7	Maryland Eastern Shore	2	5	Norfolk State	1	4	North Carolina A&T	1
4	North Carolina A&T	6
3	Florida A&M	1
4	North Carolina A&T	5

=== Game results ===
Date	Game	Winner	Score	Loser	Notes
April 29	Game 1	(5) Norfolk State	8–4	(4) North Carolina A&T	
April 29	Game 2	(3) Florida A&M	7–2	(6) Coppin State	
April 29	Game 3	(2) Delaware State	21–0	(7) Maryland Eastern Shore	
April 29	Game 4	(1) Bethune-Cookman	9–0	(5) Norfolk State	
April 30	Game 5	(2) Delaware State	12–0	(3) Florida A&M	
April 30	Game 6	(6) Coppin State	3–2	(7) Maryland Eastern Shore	Maryland Eastern Shore eliminated
April 30	Game 7	(4) North Carolina A&T	5–1	(3) Florida A&M	Florida A&M eliminated
April 30	Game 8	(5) Norfolk State	7–2	(6) Coppin State	Coppin State eliminated
May 1	Game 9	(1) Bethune-Cookman	7–3	(2) Delaware State	
May 1	Game 10	(4) North Carolina A&T	6–1	(5) Norfolk State	Norfolk State eliminated
May 1	Game 11	(2) Delaware State	5–1	(4) North Carolina A&T	North Carolina A&T eliminated
May 2	Game 12	(2) Delaware State	4–3	(1) Bethune-Cookman	
May 2	Game 13	(1) Bethune-Cookman	7–4	(2) Delaware State	Bethune-Cookman wins MEAC Championship

== All-Tournament Team ==
The following players were named to the All-Tournament Team.

Name	Team
Juan Figueroa	Bethune-Cookman
Brad Fricke	Bethune-Cookman
Bryan Maples	Bethune-Cookman
Jon Roberts	Bethune-Cookman
Brandon Gravely	Delaware State
Garrett Weir	Delaware State
Kelly Williams	Delaware State
A.J. Corbin	Norfolk State
Austin Love	North Carolina A&T

=== Outstanding Performer ===
Jon Roberts was named Tournament Outstanding Performer. Roberts was an outfielder for Bethune-Cookman.
