= 2016 Mid-Eastern Athletic Conference baseball tournament =

- Teams: 6
- Format: Double-elimination tournament
- Finals site: Arthur W. Perdue Stadium; Salisbury, MD
- Champions: Bethune-Cookman (15th title)
- Winning coach: Jason Beverlin (3rd title)
- MVP: Danny Rodriguez (Bethune-Cookman)

2016 Mid-Eastern Athletic Conference baseball standings
	Conf.				Overall
Team	W		L	PCT	W		L	PCT
Northern
Norfolk State ^{x}‍‍‍	19	–	5	.792	29	–	21	.580
Delaware State ‍‍‍	13	–	10	.565	13	–	37	.260
Coppin State ‍‍‍	8	–	16	.333	14	–	38	.269
Maryland Eastern Shore ‍‍‍	7	–	16	.304	16	–	32	.333
Southern
Florida A&M ^{x}‍‍‍	19	–	5	.792	31	–	21	.596
Bethune–Cookman ‍‍‡‍^{y}	17	–	7	.708	29	–	27	.518
North Carolina Central ‍‍‍	11	–	13	.458	25	–	30	.455
Savannah State ‍‍‍	7	–	17	.292	12	–	40	.231
North Carolina A&T ‍‍‍	6	–	18	.250	13	–	41	.241
‡ – Tournament champion y – Invited to the NCAA tournament As of June 11, 2016; Rankings from Collegiate Baseball

The 2016 Mid-Eastern Athletic Conference baseball tournament began on May 19 and ended on May 24 at Arthur W. Perdue Stadium, in Salisbury, MD. It was a six-team double elimination tournament. Bethune-Cookman won their record fifteenth tournament championship and earned the Mid-Eastern Athletic Conference's automatic bid to the 2016 NCAA Division I baseball tournament.

Entering the tournament, Bethune-Cookman had claimed fourteen of the seventeen tournament championships, with Florida A&M winning in 2015, Savannah State in 2013 and North Carolina A&T earning the 2005 title.

== Format and seeding ==
The top three teams in each division will be seeded one through three based on regular season records. The two division winners will earn a first round bye, with the second seed from each division playing the third seed from the opposite division in the first round.. The winners advance in the winners' bracket, while first round losers play elimination games.

North Division
Team	W	L	Pct	GB	Seed
Norfolk State	19	5	.792	—	1N
Delaware State	13	10	.565	5.5	2N
Coppin State	8	16	.333	11	3N
Maryland Eastern Shore	7	16	.304	11.5	—

South Division
Team	W	L	Pct	GB	Seed
Florida A&M	19	5	.792	—	1S
Bethune-Cookman	17	7	.708	2	2S
North Carolina Central	11	13	.458	8	3S
Savannah State	7	17	.292	12	—
North Carolina A&T	6	18	.250	13	—

== Bracket ==
Upper round 1
2S	Bethune-Cookman	10
3N	Coppin State	0
2N	Delaware State	5
3S	North Carolina Central	10
Lower round 1
3N	Coppin State	15
2N	Delaware State	4
3N	Coppin State	7
3S	North Carolina Central	5

Upper round 2
1N	Norfolk State	4
2S	Bethune-Cookman	14
1S	Florida A&M	10
3S	North Carolina Central	2
Lower round 2
3N	Coppin State	6
1N	Norfolk State	7***

Upper final
2S	Bethune-Cookman	5
1S	Florida A&M	2
Lower final
1S	Florida A&M	2
1N	Norfolk State	4

Final
2S	Bethune-Cookman	1
1N	Norfolk State	0
