= 2007 Mid-Eastern Athletic Conference baseball tournament =

- Teams: 6
- Format: Double-elimination tournament
- Finals site: Marty L. Miller Field; Norfolk, Virginia
- Champions: Bethune-Cookman (8th title)
- Winning coach: Mervyl Melendez (7th title)
- MVP: Angel Mercado (Bethune-Cookman)

2007 Mid-Eastern Athletic Conference baseball standings
	Conf.						Overall
Team	W		L		T	PCT	W		L		T	PCT
Bethune-Cookman ‍†‍‡‍^{y}	16	–	1	–	0	.941	33	–	27	–	0	.550
North Carolina A&T ‍‍‍	11	–	7	–	0	.611	28	–	31	–	0	.475
Florida A&M ‍‍‍	11	–	7	–	0	.611	16	–	36	–	0	.308
Delaware State ‍‍‍	10	–	8	–	0	.556	22	–	27	–	2	.451
Norfolk State ‍‍‍	9	–	8	–	0	.529	25	–	25	–	0	.500
Maryland Eastern Shore ‍‍‍	5	–	13	–	0	.278	10	–	45	–	0	.182
Coppin State ‍‍‍	0	–	18	–	0	.000	0	–	44	–	0	.000
† – Conference champion ‡ – Tournament champion y – Invited to the NCAA tournament As of June 30, 2007; Rankings from Collegiate Baseball

The 2007 Mid-Eastern Athletic Conference baseball tournament began on May 17 and ended on May 20 at Marty L. Miller Field, on the campus of Norfolk State University in Norfolk, Virginia. It was a six-team double elimination tournament. Bethune-Cookman won the tournament, as they have done each year but one since 1999. The Wildcats claimed the Mid-Eastern Athletic Conference's automatic bid to the 2007 NCAA Division I baseball tournament.

== Format and seeding ==
The top six finishers from the regular season were seeded one through six based on conference winning percentage only, with the top seed playing the sixth seed, second seed playing the fifth, and so on for first round matchups. The winners advanced in the winners' bracket, while first round losers played elimination games. The format meant that Coppin State was left out of the field.

Team	W	L	Pct.	GB	Seed
Bethune-Cookman	16	1	.941	—	1
Florida A&M	11	7	.611	5.5	2
North Carolina A&T	11	7	.611	5.5	3
Delaware State	10	8	.556	6.5	4
Norfolk State	9	8	.529	7	5
Maryland Eastern Shore	5	13	.278	11.5	6
Coppin State	0	18	.000	16.5	—

== Bracket and results ==
Bracket to be added

=== Game results ===
Date	Game	Winner	Score	Loser	Notes
May 17	Game 1	(1) Bethune-Cookman	13–2	(6) Maryland Eastern Shore	
May 17	Game 2	(5) Norfolk State	14–2	(2) Florida A&M	
May 17	Game 3	(3) North Carolina A&T	12–1	(4) Delaware State	
May 18	Game 4	(6) Maryland Eastern Shore	8–6 ^{(10)}	(2) Florida A&M	Florida A&M eliminated
May 18	Game 5	(5) Norfolk State	9–5	(3) North Carolina A&T	
May 18	Game 6	(4) Delaware State	8–4	(6) Maryland Eastern Shore	Maryland Eastern Shore eliminated
May 19	Game 7	(3) North Carolina A&T	7–1	(4) Delaware State	Delaware State eliminated
May 19	Game 8	(1) Bethune-Cookman	7–3	(5) Norfolk State	
May 19	Game 9	(3) North Carolina A&T	6–0	(5) Norfolk State	Norfolk State eliminated
May 20	Game 10	(3) North Carolina A&T	4–3	(1) Bethune-Cookman	
May 20	Game 11	(1) Bethune-Cookman	6–4	(3) North Carolina A&T	Bethune-Cookman wins MEAC Championship

== All-Tournament Team ==
The following players were named to the All-Tournament Team.

Name	Team
Eric Allen	Delaware State
Ernie Banks	Norfolk State
Darryl Evans	Florida A&M
Charlie Gamble	North Carolina A&T
Joel Gonzalez	Maryland Eastern Shore
Justin Hoban	Maryland Eastern Shore
Alejandro Jimenez	Bethune-Cookman
Charles LaLane	Norfolk State
Dustin Longchamps	Maryland Eastern Shore
Thaddeus McBurrows	Florida A&M
Angel Meracado	Bethune-Cookman
Jose Ortiz-Rivera	Bethune-Cookman
John Primus	North Carolina A&T

=== Outstanding Performer ===
Angel Mercado was named Tournament Outstanding Performer. Mercado was an infielder for Bethune-Cookman.
