= 2019 Mid-Eastern Athletic Conference baseball tournament =

Postseason collegiate baseball tournament

- Teams: 8
- Format: Double-elimination tournament
- Finals site: Jackie Robinson Ballpark; Daytona Beach, FL
- Champions: Florida A&M (2nd title)
- Winning coach: Jamey Shouppe (2nd title)
- MVP: Kaycee Reese ((Florida A&M))
- Television: FloSports

2019 Mid-Eastern Athletic Conference baseball standings
	Conf.						Overall
Team	W		L		T	PCT	W		L		T	PCT
Northern
Norfolk State ^{x}‍‍‍	17	–	7	–	0	.708	24	–	26	–	0	.480
Coppin State ‍‍‍	15	–	9	–	0	.625	24	–	24	–	0	.500
Delaware State ‍‍‍	12	–	12	–	0	.500	20	–	25	–	0	.444
Maryland Eastern Shore ‍‍‍	4	–	20	–	0	.167	10	–	44	–	0	.185
Southern
North Carolina A&T ^{x}‍‍‍	16	–	8	–	0	.667	29	–	24	–	0	.547
Florida A&M ‍‍‡‍^{y}	14	–	10	–	0	.583	27	–	34	–	0	.443
North Carolina Central ‍‍‍	10	–	14	–	0	.417	21	–	28	–	0	.429
Savannah State ‍‍‍	10	–	14	–	0	.417	13	–	27	–	1	.329
Bethune-Cookman ‍‍‍	10	–	14	–	0	.417	17	–	38	–	0	.309
x – Division champion ‡ – Tournament champion y – Invited to the NCAA tournament As of June 4, 2019; Rankings from D1Baseball

The 2019 Mid-Eastern Athletic Conference baseball tournament began on May 15 and ended on May 18 at Jackie Robinson Ballpark on the campus of Bethune-Cookman University in Daytona Beach, FL. It was a six-team double elimination tournament. The winner, Florida A&M, claimed the Mid-Eastern Athletic Conference's automatic bid to the 2019 NCAA Division I baseball tournament. Bethune-Cookman had claimed sixteen of the prior twenty tournament championships, with North Carolina A&T earning the 2005 and 2018 titles, Florida A&M winning in 2015, and Savannah State in 2013.

== Format and seeding ==
The top three teams in the North and South Division were seeded one through three based on regular season records, with first round matchups of the second seed from the North and the third seed from the South, and the second seed from the South and the third seed from the North. The winners advanced in the winners' bracket, while first round losers played elimination games. The top seed from each division earned a first round bye.

== Bracket ==
Upper round 1	Upper round 2	Upper final	Final
1N	Norfolk State	7
2S	Florida A&M	13	2S	Florida A&M	2
3N	Delaware State	3	1N	Norfolk State	4
1S	North Carolina A&T	2
1S	North Carolina A&T	5
2N	Coppin State	3	3S	Savannah State	4
3S	Savannah State	7
1N	Norfolk State	4	1
2S	Florida A&M	5	8
Lower round 1	Lower round 2	Lower round 3	Lower final
2S	Florida A&M	6
3N	Delaware State	8	1S	North Carolina A&T	2
3N	Delaware State	5	2S	Florida A&M	9
3N	Delaware State	6	3S	Savannah State	4
2N	Coppin State	5

== Game summaries ==
=== Conference championship ===
MEAC Championship
(2S) Florida A&M Rattlers	vs.	(1N) Norfolk State Spartans

May 18, 2019, 1:00 pm EDT, at Jackie Robinson Park in Daytona Beach, Florida, 81 °F (27 °C), clear
Team	1	2	3	4	5	6	7	8	9	R	H	E
(2S) Florida A&M	0	0	0	2	0	0	0	1	2	5	7	1
(1N) Norfolk State	0	0	1	0	1	0	2	0	0	4	10	2
WP: Jeremiah McCollum (5–2) LP: Trey Hanchey (3–1) Sv: None; Home runs: FAMU: None; NSU: Alsander Womack (3); Caleb Ward (5); Attendance: 300

May 18, 2019, 5:00 pm EDT, at Jackie Robinson Park in Daytona Beach, Florida, 80 °F (27 °C), clear
Team	1	2	3	4	5	6	7	8	9	R	H	E
(2S) Florida A&M	6	1	0	0	1	0	0	0	0	8	11	1
(1N) Norfolk State	1	0	0	0	0	0	0	0	0	1	6	4
WP: Kyle Coleman (6–5) LP: Kevin Alicea (2–5) Sv: None; Home runs: FAMU: None; NSU: None; Attendance: 250
