= 2005 Mid-Eastern Athletic Conference baseball tournament =

- Teams: 7
- Format: Double-elimination tournament
- Finals site: Cracker Jack Stadium; Daytona Beach, Florida
- Champions: North Carolina A&T (3rd title)
- Winning coach: Keith Shumate (1st title)
- MVP: Joe McIntyre (North Carolina A&T)

2005 Mid-Eastern Athletic Conference baseball standings
	Conf.				Overall
Team	W		L	PCT	W		L	PCT
North Carolina A&T ‍†‍‡‍^{y}	12	–	6	.667	27	–	27	.500
Bethune-Cookman ‍‍‍	11	–	6	.647	22	–	28	.440
Delaware State ‍‍‍	10	–	7	.588	19	–	27	.413
Coppin State ‍‍‍	10	–	7	.588	21	–	31	.404
Florida A&M ‍‍‍	9	–	9	.500	19	–	33	.365
Norfolk State ‍‍‍	8	–	9	.471	14	–	36	.280
Maryland Eastern Shore ‍‍‍	1	–	19	.050	6	–	41	.128
† – Conference champion ‡ – Tournament champion y – Invited to the NCAA tournament As of June 25, 2005; Rankings from Collegiate Baseball

The 2005 Mid-Eastern Athletic Conference baseball tournament began on April 28 and ended on May 1 at Cracker Jack Stadium in Lake Buena Vista, Florida. It was a seven-team double elimination tournament. North Carolina A&T won the tournament, ending a streak of six straight titles by Bethune-Cookman. The Aggies claimed the Mid-Eastern Athletic Conference's automatic bid to the 2005 NCAA Division I baseball tournament.

== Format and seeding ==
The teams were seeded one through seven based on conference winning percentage only, with the top seed receiving a single bye while the second seed played the seventh seed, third seed played the sixth, and so on for first round matchups. The winners advanced in the winners' bracket, while first round losers played elimination games.

Team	W	L	Pct.	GB	Seed
North Carolina A&T	12	6	.667	—	1
Bethune-Cookman	11	6	.647	0.5	2
Coppin State	10	7	.588	1.5	3
Delaware State	10	7	.588	1.5	4
Florida A&M	9	9	.500	3	5
Norfolk State	8	9	.471	3.5	6
Maryland Eastern Shore	1	19	.050	12	7

== Bracket and results ==
Upper round 1	Upper round 2	Upper final	Final
1	North Carolina A&T	10
5	Florida A&M	1
4	Delaware State	9
5	Florida A&M	10
1	North Carolina A&T	13
6	Norfolk State	3
3	Coppin State	2
6	Norfolk State	4
6	Norfolk State	9
2	Bethune-Cookman	6
2	Bethune-Cookman	10
7	Maryland Eastern Shore	9
1	North Carolina A&T	10	—
6	Norfolk State	9	—
Lower round 1	Lower round 2	Lower round 3	Lower final
3	Coppin State	13
3	Coppin State	8	5	Florida A&M	11	6	Norfolk State	5
7	Maryland Eastern Shore	2	3	Coppin State	2	2	Bethune-Cookman	2
2	Bethune-Cookman	11
2	Bethune-Cookman	9
4	Delaware State	1

=== Game results ===
Date	Game	Winner	Score	Loser	Notes
April 28	Game 1	(5) Florida A&M	10–9	(4) Delaware State	
April 28	Game 2	(6) Norfolk State	4–2	(3) Coppin State	
April 28	Game 3	(2) Bethune-Cookman	10–9	(7) Maryland Eastern Shore	
April 28	Game 4	(1) North Carolina A&T	10–1	(5) Florida A&M	
April 29	Game 5	(6) Norfolk State	9–6	(2) Bethune-Cookman	
April 29	Game 6	(3) Coppin State	8–2	(7) Maryland Eastern Shore	Maryland Eastern Shore eliminated
April 29	Game 7	(2) Bethune-Cookman	9–1	(4) Delaware State	Delaware State eliminated
April 29	Game 8	(3) Coppin State	13–11	(5) Florida A&M	Florida A&M eliminated
April 30	Game 9	(1) North Carolina A&T	13–3	(6) Norfolk State	
April 30	Game 10	(2) Bethune-Cookman	11–2	(3) Coppin State	Coppin State eliminated
April 30	Game 11	(6) Norfolk State	5–2	(2) Bethune-Cookman	Bethune-Cookman eliminated
May 1	Game 12	(1) North Carolina A&T	10–9	(6) Norfolk State	North Carolina A&T wins MEAC Championship

== All-Tournament Team ==
The following players were named to the All-Tournament Team.

Name	Team
Ernie Banks	Norfolk State
Wes Bush	Norfolk State
Paul Conway	Coppin State
Charlie Gamble	North Carolina A&T
Michael Hauff	North Carolina A&T
Joe McIntyre	North Carolina A&T
Carlos Picornell	Bethune-Cookman
Raul Santiago	North Carolina A&T
Juan Serrano	Norfolk State

=== Outstanding Performer ===
Joe McIntyre was named Tournament Outstanding Performer. McIntyre was a designated hitter for North Carolina A&T.
