= 2010 Mid-Eastern Athletic Conference baseball tournament =

- Teams: 6
- Format: Double-elimination tournament
- Finals site: Jackie Robinson Ballpark; Daytona Beach, Florida
- Champions: Bethune-Cookman (11th title)
- Winning coach: Mervyl Melendez (10th title)
- MVP: DJ Leonard (Bethune-Cookman)

2010 Mid-Eastern Athletic Conference baseball standings
	Conf.						Overall
Team	W		L		T	PCT	W		L		T	PCT
Bethune-Cookman ‍†‍‡‍^{y}	18	–	0	–	0	1.000	35	–	22	–	0	.614
North Carolina A&T ‍‍‍	15	–	3	–	0	.833	31	–	26	–	0	.544
Norfolk State ‍‍‍	9	–	9	–	0	.500	21	–	29	–	1	.422
Delaware State ‍‍‍	8	–	10	–	0	.444	13	–	36	–	0	.265
Coppin State ‍‍‍	7	–	11	–	0	.389	14	–	33	–	0	.298
Florida A&M ‍‍‍	3	–	15	–	0	.167	10	–	31	–	1	.250
Maryland Eastern Shore ‍‍‍	3	–	15	–	0	.167	8	–	43	–	0	.157
† – Conference champion ‡ – Tournament champion y – Invited to the NCAA tournament As of June 7, 2010; Rankings from Collegiate Baseball

The 2010 Mid-Eastern Athletic Conference baseball tournament began on May 20 and ended on May 23 at Jackie Robinson Ballpark, on the campus of Bethune-Cookman University in Daytona Beach, Florida. It was a six-team double elimination tournament. Bethune-Cookman won the tournament, as they have done each year but one since the tournament began in 1999. The Wildcats claimed the Mid-Eastern Athletic Conference's automatic bid to the 2010 NCAA Division I baseball tournament.

== Format and seeding ==
The top six finishers from the regular season were seeded one through six based on conference winning percentage only, with the top seed playing the sixth seed, second seed playing the fifth, and so on for first round matchups. The winners advanced in the winners' bracket, while first round losers played elimination games. The format meant that Florida A&M was left out of the field.

Team	W	L	Pct.	GB	Seed
Bethune-Cookman	18	0	1.000	—	1
North Carolina A&T	15	3	.833	3	2
Norfolk State	9	9	.500	9	3
Delaware State	8	10	.444	10	4
Coppin State	7	11	.389	11	5
Maryland Eastern Shore	3	15	.167	15	6
Florida A&M	3	15	.167	15	—

== Bracket and results ==
Bracket to be added

=== Game results ===
Date	Game	Winner	Score	Loser	Notes
May 20	Game 1	(2) North Carolina A&T	5–3	(5) Coppin State	
May 20	Game 2	(1) Bethune-Cookman	15–5	(6) Maryland Eastern Shore	
May 20	Game 3	(3) Norfolk State	5–4	(4) Delaware State	
May 21	Game 4	(5) Coppin State	12–8	(6) Maryland Eastern Shore	Maryland Eastern Shore eliminated
May 21	Game 5	(2) North Carolina A&T	7–2	(3) Norfolk State	
May 21	Game 6	(4) Delaware State	14–2	(5) Coppin State	Coppin State eliminated
May 22	Game 7	(3) Norfolk State	5–1	(4) Delaware State	Delaware State eliminated
May 22	Game 8	(2) North Carolina A&T	8–7	(3) Norfolk State	Norfolk State eliminated
May 22	Game 9	(1) Bethune-Cookman	7–3	(2) North Carolina A&T	
May 23	Game 10	(1) Bethune-Cookman	7–4	(2) North Carolina A&T	Bethune–Cookman wins MEAC Championship

== All-Tournament Team ==
The following players were named to the All-Tournament Team.

Name	Team
Jeremy Davis	Bethune-Cookman
Kelvin Freeman	North Carolina A&T
George Hines	North Carolina A&T
DJ Leonard	Bethune-Cookman
Nick Oelker	North Carolina A&T
Esterlin Paulino	North Carolina A&T
Dwight Robinson	Coppin State
Nick Rogers	North Carolina A&T
Alejandro Sanchez	Bethune-Cookman
Sammy Serefine	Norfolk State
Phil Vaughn	Maryland Eastern Shore

=== Outstanding Performer ===
DJ Leonard was named Tournament Outstanding Performer. Leonard was an outfielder for Bethune-Cookman.
