= Keith Shumate =

American baseball coach and player

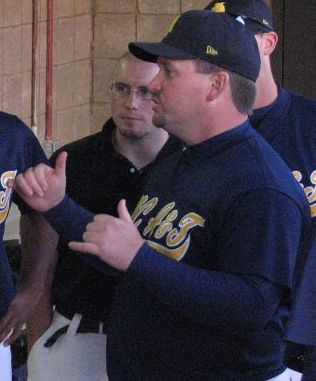
- Shumate with North Carolina A&T in 2007

Biographical details
- Born: 1965 or 1966 (age 59–60)

Playing career
- 1985–1988: Western Carolina

Coaching career (HC unless noted)
- 1994–1996: Greensboro (NC) Grimsley HS
- 1997–2011: North Carolina A&T
- 2013–2015: Louisburg
- 2018–2025: Norfolk State

Head coaching record
- Overall: 415–748 (NCAA); 74–66 (NJCAA)
- Tournaments: NCAA: 0–4

Accomplishments and honors

Championships
- MEAC Championship (2005); MEAC Tournament (2005, 2021)

Awards
- MEAC Coach of the Year (2019)

Keith Shumate is an American baseball coach and former player, who recently served as the head baseball coach of the Norfolk State Spartans. He played college baseball at Western Carolina from 1985 to 1988. He served as the head coach of the North Carolina A&T Aggies (1997–2011) and the Louisburg Hurricanes (2013–2015).

== Playing career ==
Shumate was a player for the Western Carolina Catamounts baseball program from 1985 to 1988.

== Coaching career ==
From 1994 to 1996, Shumate was the head coach at Grimsley High School in Greensboro, North Carolina.

After going 89–216 in his first 5 seasons, Shumate was unsure that he would be able to keep his job under new athletic's director, Charlie Davis, but just two seasons later he led the Aggies to their first MEAC championship in 12 years. On April 19, 2011, Shumate announced that he would be resigning at the end of the season.

Shumate stepped away from his coaching career in 2015 to watch his son's final two seasons of college baseball.

On July 18, 2012, Shumate was named the head coach of Louisburg College.

On August 25, 2017, Shumate was hired as an assistant coach by the Norfolk State Spartans baseball program. On September 28, 2017, Shumate was named the interim head coach after head coach Claudell Clark resigned.

== Head coaching record ==
Statistics overview
Season	Team	Overall	Conference	Standing	Postseason
North Carolina A&T Aggies (Mid-Eastern Athletic Conference) (1997–2011)
1997	North Carolina A&T	4–45	–		
1998	North Carolina A&T	–	–		
1999	North Carolina A&T	–	–		
2000	North Carolina A&T	–	–		
2001	North Carolina A&T	–	–		
2002	North Carolina A&T	19–39	6–11	3rd (South)	
2003	North Carolina A&T	13–36	6–10	3rd (South)	
2004	North Carolina A&T	23–28	10–8	4th	
2005	North Carolina A&T	27–27	12–6	1st	NCAA Regional
2006	North Carolina A&T	22–36	6–12	6th	
2007	North Carolina A&T	28–31	11–7	2nd	
2008	North Carolina A&T	29–30	11–6	2nd	
2009	North Carolina A&T	21–34	9–8	5th	
2010	North Carolina A&T	31–26	15–3	2nd	MEAC tournament
2011	North Carolina A&T	21–34	10–8	3rd	MEAC tournament
North Carolina A&T:		304–498	96–76		
Louisburg College Hurricanes (CAROLINAS JUNIOR COLLEGE CONFERENCE) (2013–2015)
2013	Louisburg College	34–15	17–9		
2014	Louisburg College	27–23	8–16		Region X Runner-Up
2015	Louisburg College	13–28	7–17		
Louisburg College (NJCAA):		74–66	32–42		
Norfolk State Spartans (Mid-Eastern Athletic Conference) (2018–2022)
2018	Norfolk State	19–30	13–10	2nd (Northern)	MEAC tournament
2019	Norfolk State	24–26	17–7	1st (Northern)	MEAC tournament
2020	Norfolk State	3–13	0–0		Season canceled due to COVID-19
2021	Norfolk State	25–28	18–10	1st (Northern)	NCAA Regional
2022	Norfolk State	15–32	12–18	4th	MEAC tournament
Norfolk State:			60–45		
Norfolk State Spartans (Northeast Conference) (2023–2025)
2023	Norfolk State	9–42	6–24	11th	
2024	Norfolk State	12–41	7–26	11th	
2025	Norfolk State	4–38	4–26	11th	
Norfolk State:		111–250	17–76		
Total:		415–748			
National champion Postseason invitational champion Conference regular season champion Conference regular season and conference tournament champion Division regular season champion Division regular season and conference tournament champion Conference tournament champion

== See also ==
- List of current NCAA Division I baseball coaches
