= 2011 Mid-Eastern Athletic Conference baseball tournament =

- Teams: 6
- Format: Double-elimination tournament
- Finals site: Jackie Robinson Ballpark; Daytona Beach, Florida
- Champions: Bethune-Cookman (12th title)
- Winning coach: Mervyl Melendez (11th title)
- MVP: Peter O'Brien (Bethune-Cookman)

2011 Mid-Eastern Athletic Conference baseball standings
	Conf.				Overall
Team	W		L	PCT	W		L	PCT
Bethune-Cookman ‍†‍‡‍^{y}	18	–	0	1.000	36	–	25	.590
Delaware State ‍‍‍	11	–	7	.611	26	–	29	.473
North Carolina A&T ‍‍‍	10	–	8	.556	21	–	34	.382
Norfolk State ‍‍‍	9	–	9	.500	24	–	29	.453
Maryland Eastern Shore ‍‍‍	7	–	11	.389	9	–	41	.180
Florida A&M ‍‍‍	6	–	12	.333	17	–	40	.298
Coppin State ‍‍‍	2	–	16	.111	5	–	39	.114
† – Conference champion ‡ – Tournament champion y – Invited to the NCAA tournament As of June 7, 2011; Rankings from Collegiate Baseball

The 2011 Mid-Eastern Athletic Conference baseball tournament began on May 18 and ended on May 21 at Jackie Robinson Ballpark, on the campus of Bethune-Cookman University in Daytona Beach, Florida. It was a six-team double elimination tournament. Bethune-Cookman won the tournament, as they have done each year but one since the tournament began in 1999. The Wildcats claimed the Mid-Eastern Athletic Conference's automatic bid to the 2011 NCAA Division I baseball tournament.

== Format and seeding ==
The top six finishers from the regular season were seeded one through six based on conference winning percentage only, with the top seed playing the sixth seed, second seed playing the fifth, and so on for first round matchups. The winners advanced in the winners' bracket, while first round losers played elimination games. The format meant that Coppin State was left out of the field.

Team	W	L	Pct.	GB	Seed
Bethune-Cookman	18	0	1.000	—	1
Delaware State	11	7	.611	7	2
North Carolina A&T	10	8	.556	8	3
Norfolk State	9	9	.500	9	4
Maryland Eastern Shore	7	11	.389	11	5
Florida A&M	6	12	.333	12	6
Coppin State	2	16	.111	16	—

== Bracket and results ==
Bracket to be added

=== Game results ===
Date	Game	Winner	Score	Loser	Notes
May 18	1	No. 2 Delaware State	5 – 0	No. 5 Maryland Eastern Shore	
May 18	2	No. 1 Bethune-Cookman	18 – 5	No. 6 Florida A&M	
May 18	3	No. 4 Norfolk State	14 – 4	No. 3 North Carolina A&T	
May 19	4	Maryland Eastern Shore	11 – 6	Florida A&M	Florida A&M eliminated
May 19	5	Norfolk State	11 – 1	Delaware State	
May 19	6	North Carolina A&T	11 – 1	Maryland Eastern Shore	Maryland Eastern Shore eliminated
May 20	7	Delaware State	3 – 2	North Carolina A&T	North Carolina A&T eliminated
May 20	8	Bethune-Cookman	8 – 0	Norfolk State	
May 20	9	Norfolk State	9 – 3	Delaware State	Delaware State eliminated
May 21	10	Bethune-Cookman	9 – 3	Norfolk State	Bethune-Cookman wins MEAC Tournament

== All-Tournament Team ==
The following players were named to the All-Tournament Team.

Name	Team
Tobi Adeyemi	Florida A&M
Scott Davis	Delaware State
Ryan Durrence	Bethune-Cookman
Brandon Hairston	Norfolk State
Tre-Von Johnson	Maryland Eastern Shore
Luis Mena	Maryland Eastern Shore
John Rasberry	Norfolk State
Peter O'Brien	Bethune-Cookman
Nick Oelker	North Carolina A&T
Ryan Shook	Norfolk State
James Taylor	Norfolk State

=== Outstanding Performer ===
Peter O'Brien
Bethune-Cookman
