= Bethune–Cookman Wildcats =

Collegiate arthletic team in Florida, US

- University: Bethune–Cookman University
- Conference: SWAC
- Division: Division I (FCS)
- Athletic director: Reggie Theus
- Location: Daytona Beach, Florida
- Varsity teams: 14 (5 men's, 8 women's, 1 co-ed)
- Football stadium: Daytona Stadium
- Basketball arena: Moore Gymnasium
- Baseball stadium: Jackie Robinson Ballpark
- Softball stadium: Sunnyland Park
- Tennis venue: City Island Tennis Courts
- Other venues: LPGA International; Ormond Lanes
- Mascot: Wil D Cat
- Nickname: Wildcats
- Fight song: Let's Go Wildcats
- Colors: Maroon and gold
- Website: bcuathletics.com
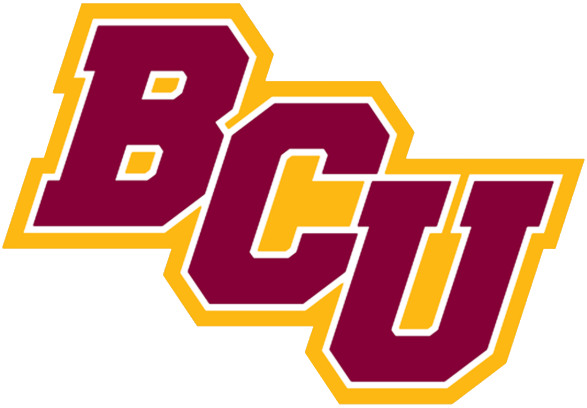

The Bethune–Cookman Wildcats are the athletic teams that represent Bethune–Cookman University in Daytona Beach, Florida. Bethune–Cookman is a member of the Southwestern Athletic Conference and participates in NCAA Division I Football Championship Subdivision (FCS).

Bethune–Cookman fields 14 teams (five men's, eight women's, one co-ed) and have won 31 MEAC titles in the history of their athletic program: 14 in baseball, six in softball, three in football, two in women's cross country, two in women's indoor track and field, two in women's tennis, one in bowling and one in men's cross country.

| Men's sports | Women's sports |
|---|---|
| Baseball | Basketball |
| Basketball | Bowling |
| Cross country | Cross country |
| Football | Golf |
| Track and field^{†} | Softball |
| | Tennis |
| | Track and field^{†} |
| | Volleyball |
† – Track and field includes both indoor and outdoor

== Baseball ==
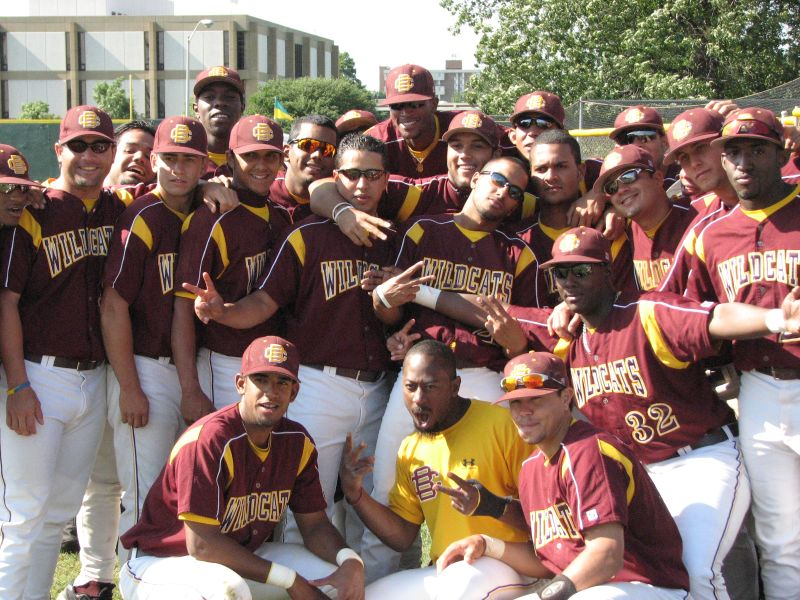
The Wildcats after winning the 2007 MEAC baseball tournament

Athletic Director Lynn W. Thompson announced on July 26, 2011 that Jason Beverlin, the pitching coach at Tennessee for the past two seasons, would become the Wildcats' new head baseball coach. Beverlin replaced Mervyl Melendez.

Under Melendez, the baseball team had achieved success, including five consecutive MEAC championships from 2000–2004, and six more from 2006–2011.

In 2006, one of his players was credited with Player of the Year, Rookie of the Year, and Pitcher of the Year accolades. Melendez was voted MEAC Coach of the year 2000 and 2001. The Wildcats under Melendez have made regional appearances in every year from 2000–2004 and 2006–2011. Bethune–Cookman also claimed tournament championships in 1997 and 1999 under coach Richard Skeel and in 2012 in Beverlin's first season.

== Softball ==
Laura Watten is the head coach for the Lady Wildcats softball team.

B-CU made a notable run to the Super Regionals of the 2005 NCAA Softball Tournament. The Wildcats finished with a 42-15 regular season record and though they were eliminated in the MEAC tournament, they advanced to the national tournament as an at-large team and became the first HBCU to earn a national at-large bid in any sport. B-CU then swept through the Gainesville Regional, winning three straight games and never trailing, to advance to the Super Regional. The Wildcats pushed Texas on its home field into the ninth inning in the first game of the Austin Super Regional, but Texas won 1-0 and then 6-1 in the next game to advance to the Women's College World Series.

== Golf ==
The men's and women's Wildcat golf teams are coached by Lortiz Clark (head coach) and Jack McClairen (assistant coach). The teams use Indigo Lakes Golf Club and LPGA International as their home fields during competitions.
