= 2006 NCAA Division I baseball season =

Baseball season

- Duration: January 26-June 26, 2006
- Number of teams: 293
- Preseason No. 1: Texas

Tournament
- Duration: June 2–June 26, 2006
- Most conference bids: SEC (8)

College World Series
- Duration: June 16–June 26, 2006
- Champions: Oregon State (1st title)
- Runners-up: North Carolina (5th CWS Appearance)
- Winning coach: Pat Casey (1st title)
- MOP: Jonah Nickerson (Oregon State)

Seasons
- ← 2005 2007 →

The 2006 NCAA Division I baseball season play of college baseball in the United States, organized by the National Collegiate Athletic Association (NCAA) at the Division I level, began on January 26, 2006. The season progressed through the regular season, many conference tournaments and championship series, and concluded with the 2006 NCAA Division I baseball tournament and 2006 College World Series. The College World Series, which consisted of the eight remaining teams in the NCAA tournament, was held in its annual location of Omaha, Nebraska, at Rosenblatt Stadium. It concluded on June 26, 2006, with the final game of the best of three championship series. Oregon State defeated North Carolina two games to one to claim their first championship.

== Realignment ==
=== New programs ===
Stephen F. Austin brought back its varsity intercollegiate baseball program for the 2006 season, after having dropped the program following the 1995 season.

Both Kennesaw State and North Florida transitioned from Division II to Division I for the 2006 season.

=== Conference changes ===
Entering the 2006 baseball season, many baseball-sponsoring schools changed conferences. Several schools left Conference USA, as Charlotte and St. Louis left for the Atlantic 10 Conference, Cincinnati, Louisville, and South Florida left for the Big East Conference, and Texas Christian left for the Mountain West Conference. In order to replace these schools, Conference USA added Rice from the Western Athletic Conference, Marshall from the Mid-American Conference, and Central Florida from the Atlantic Sun Conference.

In order to compensate for the schools lost to Conference USA, the Western Athletic Conference also made several changes. New Mexico State joined from the Sun Belt Conference, along with Sacramento State, previously a Division I Independent. The Sun Belt, in turn, added Florida Atlantic and Troy from the Atlantic Sun. The Colonial Athletic Association added Northeastern from the America East Conference and Georgia State from the Atlantic Sun Conference.

The Atlantic Sun added three schools, East Tennessee State from the Southern Conference and Kennesaw State and North Florida from the Division II Peach Belt Conference.

The Atlantic Coast Conference added Boston College from the Big East.

The Southland Conference added one program, as conference member Stephen F. Austin revived its baseball program.

=== Conference formats ===
As a result of the addition of Boston College as a 12th member, the Atlantic Coast Conference split into two six-team divisions. The Atlantic 10 Conference, which had added both Charlotte and St. Louis, eliminated its previous format of two six-team divisions. The West Coast Conference, which had previously competed in two four-team divisions, also eliminated its divisional format.

== Conference standings ==
America East Conference
	Conf			Overall		
Team	W	L	Pct	W	L	Pct
Vermont	16	8	.667	19	34	.358
Stony Brook	13	8	.619	25	29	.463
Maine	13	9	.591	35	22	.614
Albany	12	10	.545	20	32	.385
Binghamton	12	11	.522	27	23	.540
Hartford	8	16	.333	11	38	.224
UMBC	5	17	.227	18	34	.346

Atlantic 10 Conference
	Conf			Overall		
Team	W	L	Pct	W	L	Pct
Rhode Island	19	6	.760	34	16	.680
St. Bonaventure	18	8	.692	29	21	.580
Charlotte	18	9	.667	35	20	.636
Dayton	18	9	.667	33	24	.579
Saint Louis	15	12	.556	32	29	.525
George Washington	13	12	.520	25	34	.424
Fordham	13	14	.481	24	32	.429
La Salle	12	14	.462	20	31	.392
Richmond	12	15	.444	22	33	.400
Duquesne	12	15	.444	19	34	.358
Massachusetts	11	16	.407	14	30	.318
Xavier	9	18	.333	19	37	.339
Saint Joseph's	9	18	.333	17	39	.304
Temple	6	19	.240	12	41	.226

Atlantic Coast Conference
	Conf			Overall		
Team	W	L	Pct	W	L	Pct
Atlantic
Clemson	24	6	.800	53	16	.791
Florida State	16	13	.552	44	21	.677
North Carolina State	16	13	.552	40	23	.635
Wake Forest	16	13	.552	33	22	.600
Boston College	9	21	.300	28	25	.528
Maryland	8	22	.267	26	30	.464
Coastal
North Carolina	22	8	.733	54	15	.783
Virginia	21	9	.700	47	15	.758
Georgia Tech	19	11	.950	50	18	.735
Miami (FL)	17	13	.567	42	24	.636
Duke	6	24	.200	15	40	.273
Virginia Tech	4	25	.138	20	33	.377

Atlantic Sun Conference
	Conf			Overall		
Team	W	L	Pct	W	L	Pct
Jacksonville	23	7	.767	43	17	.717
North Florida	20	10	.667	34	21	.618
Mercer	19	11	.633	34	26	.567
Stetson	16	14	.533	38	24	.613
East Tennessee State	14	16	.467	31	27	.534
Florida Atlantic	14	16	.467	30	28	.517
Campbell	13	17	.433	19	38	.333
Gardner–Webb	12	18	.400	24	31	.436
Kennesaw State	12	18	.400	24	32	.429
Belmont	11	19	.367	24	31	.436
Lipscomb	11	19	.367	22	32	.407

Big East Conference
	Conf			Overall		
Team	W	L	Pct	W	L	Pct
Notre Dame	21	5	.808	45	17	.723
Connecticut	18	6	.750	39	18	.684
Louisville	17	10	.630	31	29	.517
St. John's	16	10	.615	40	19	.678
West Virginia	14	13	.519	36	22	.621
Cincinnati	13	14	.481	32	26	.552
Rutgers	13	14	.481	29	28	.509
South Florida	12	15	.444	23	35	.397
Pittsburgh	10	17	.370	23	29	.442
Georgetown	10	17	.370	24	32	.429
Villanova	8	18	.308	27	27	.500
Seton Hall	7	20	.259	17	34	.333

Big South Conference
	Conf			Overall		
Team	W	L	Pct	W	L	Pct
Birmingham–Southern	18	6	.750	33	22	.600
Winthrop	17	7	.708	46	18	.719
Coastal Carolina	15	9	.625	30	27	.526
High Point	14	10	.583	27	32	.458
Liberty	13	11	.542	39	21	.650
UNC Asheville	10	14	.417	28	35	.444
VMI	9	15	.375	30	25	.545
Charleston Southern	8	16	.333	18	38	.321
Radford	4	20	.167	7	41	.146

Big Ten Conference
	Conf			Overall		
Team	W	L	Pct	W	L	Pct
Michigan	23	9	.719	43	21	.672
Northwestern	21	11	.656	26	33	.441
Ohio State	19	12	.613	37	21	.638
Minnesota	17	14	.548	34	26	.567
Purdue	15	17	.469	31	27	.534
Illinois	15	17	.469	29	29	.500
Michigan State	13	19	.406	26	30	.464
Penn State	13	19	.406	20	36	.357
Iowa	12	20	.375	23	33	.411
Indiana	11	21	.344	22	34	.393

Big West Conference
	Conf			Overall		
Team	W	L	Pct	W	L	Pct
Cal State Fullerton	18	3	.857	50	15	.769
Long Beach State	12	9	.571	29	27	.518
UC Irvine	11	10	.524	36	24	.600
Cal Poly	10	11	.476	25	27	.481
Pacific	9	12	.429	30	25	.545
UC Riverside	9	12	.429	29	25	.537
UC Santa Barbara	9	12	.429	26	28	.481
Cal State Northridge	6	15	.286	26	30	.464

Big 12 Conference
	Conf			Overall		
Team	W	L	Pct	W	L	Pct
Texas	19	7	.731	41	21	.661
Oklahoma State	18	9	.667	41	20	.672
Nebraska	17	10	.630	42	17	.712
Oklahoma	17	10	.630	45	22	.672
Kansas	13	14	.481	43	25	.632
Baylor	13	14	.481	37	26	.587
Missouri	12	15	.444	35	28	.556
Texas Tech	9	16	.360	31	26	.544
Kansas State	8	17	.320	31	20	.608
Texas A&M	6	20	.231	25	30	.455

Colonial Athletic Association
	Conf			Overall		
Team	W	L	Pct	W	L	Pct
James Madison	22	8	.733	38	21	.644
Old Dominion	21	9	.700	31	17	.646
Northeastern	19	10	.655	27	23	.540
Virginia Commonwealth	18	11	.621	34	24	.586
UNC Wilmington	17	13	.567	42	22	.656
Georgia State	13	17	.433	26	31	.456
Delaware	12	18	.400	30	24	.556
George Mason	12	18	.400	20	31	.392
William & Mary	11	19	.367	23	29	.442
Hofstra	11	19	.367	24	31	.436
Towson	8	22	.267	20	34	.370

Conference USA
	Conf			Overall		
Team	W	L	Pct	W	L	Pct
Rice	22	2	.917	57	13	.814
Houston	18	6	.750	39	22	.639
Tulane	15	9	.625	43	21	.672
Southern Mississippi	13	11	.542	39	23	.629
Memphis	13	11	.542	32	28	.533
East Carolina	10	14	.417	33	26	.559
Marshall	6	18	.250	22	32	.407
UAB	6	18	.250	19	38	.333
Central Florida	5	19	.208	23	33	.411

Horizon League
	Conf			Overall		
Team	W	L	Pct	W	L	Pct
Illinois–Chicago	22	7	.759	35	20	.636
Wisconsin–Milwaukee	18	12	.600	32	25	.561
Wright State	17	13	.567	32	27	.542
Youngstown State	16	13	.552	26	29	.473
Butler	9	21	.300	21	36	.368
Cleveland State	6	22	.214	10	42	.192

Ivy League
	Conf				Overall	
Team	W	L	Pct	W	L	Pct
Lou Gehrig
Princeton	11	9	.450	19	26	.422
Penn	7	13	.350	12	27	.308
Columbia	6	14	.300	13	32	.289
Cornell	6	14	.300	10	29	.256
Red Rolfe
Harvard	14	6	.700	21	20	.512
Dartmouth	13	7	.650	20	19	.513
Brown	12	8	.600	16	24	.400
Yale	11	9	.550	26	19	.578

Metro Atlantic Athletic Conference
	Conf			Overall		
Team	W	L	Pct	W	L	Pct
Le Moyne	21	5	.808	38	14	.731
Manhattan	17	9	.654	34	23	.596
Niagara	17	10	.630	28	26	.519
Rider	17	10	.630	25	31	.446
Marist	16	10	.615	24	28	.462
Fairfield	12	14	.462	18	29	.383
Siena	12	15	.444	23	31	.426
Canisius	9	18	.333	18	36	.333
Iona	8	18	.308	12	42	.222
Saint Peter's	3	23	.115	10	41	.196

Mid-American Conference
	Conf			Overall		
Team	W	L	Pct	W	L	Pct
East
Kent State	19	7	.731	38	19	.667
Miami (OH)	17	10	.630	33	25	.569
Ohio	14	13	.519	22	25	.468
Bowling Green	11	16	.407	26	27	.491
Akron	8	18	.308	15	36	.294
Buffalo	6	21	.222	15	37	.288
West
Central Michigan	17	9	.654	35	23	.603
Ball State	16	9	.640	38	22	.633
Western Michigan	16	9	.640	30	22	.577
Eastern Michigan	14	12	.538	27	27	.500
Toledo	11	15	.423	26	27	.491
Northern Illinois	8	18	.308	24	31	.436

Mid-Continent Conference
	Conf			Overall		
Team	W	L	Pct	W	L	Pct
Oral Roberts	17	2	.895	41	16	.719
Western Illinois	14	8	.636	32	32	.500
Oakland	13	11	.542	20	38	.345
Centenary	11	11	.500	23	30	.434
Southern Utah	11	13	.458	26	28	.481
Valparaiso	9	14	.391	17	34	.333
Chicago State	2	18	.100	7	44	.137

Mid-Eastern Athletic Conference
	Conf			Overall		
Team	W	L	Pct	W	L	Pct
Bethune–Cookman	15	0	1.000	30	27	.526
Norfolk State	11	7	.611	23	28	.451
Coppin State	7	8	.467	13	41	.241
Maryland–Eastern Shore	8	10	.444	17	34	.333
Delaware State	7	11	.389	18	37	.327
North Carolina A&T	6	12	.333	22	36	.379
Florida A&M	6	12	.333	13	34	.277

Missouri Valley Conference
	Conf			Overall		
Team	W	L	Pct	W	L	Pct
Evansville	16	8	.667	43	22	.662
Missouri State	15	8	.652	33	22	.600
Wichita State	15	9	.625	46	22	.676
Creighton	13	11	.542	31	21	.596
Southern Illinois	12	12	.500	33	25	.569
Bradley	11	12	.478	26	31	.456
Northern Iowa	10	14	.417	28	27	.509
Illinois State	10	14	.417	20	33	.377
Indiana State	5	19	.208	20	34	.370

Mountain West Conference
	Conf			Overall		
Team	W	L	Pct	W	L	Pct
Texas Christian	17	5	.773	39	23	.629
BYU	14	8	.636	33	28	.541
San Diego State	14	8	.636	23	36	.390
UNLV	12	10	.545	29	30	.492
New Mexico	10	12	.455	30	29	.508
Utah	9	13	.409	28	28	.500
Air Force	1	21	.045	10	38	.208

Northeast Conference
	Conf			Overall		
Team	W	L	Pct	W	L	Pct
Central Connecticut	16	7	.696	33	18	.647
Quinnipiac	14	8	.636	22	24	.846
Wagner	15	9	.625	18	34	.346
Monmouth	14	9	.609	27	22	.551
Sacred Heart	14	9	.609	26	30	.464
Mount St. Mary's	12	11	.522	23	24	.489
Long Island	10	13	.435	13	33	.283
Fairleigh Dickinson	6	18	.250	10	43	.189
St. Francis (NY)	3	20	.130	6	39	.133

Ohio Valley Conference
	Conf			Overall		
Team	W	L	Pct	W	L	Pct
Samford	21	6	.778	34	25	.576
Jacksonville State	19	8	.704	35	24	.593
Eastern Illinois	17	10	.630	31	24	.564
Eastern Kentucky	16	10	.615	29	26	.527
Austin Peay	14	13	.519	32	27	.542
Southeast Missouri State	11	16	.407	23	33	.411
Tennessee Tech	11	16	.407	18	38	.321
Tennessee–Martin	9	18	.333	20	35	.364
Morehead State	8	18	.308	17	36	.321
Murray State	8	19	.296	15	40	.273

Pacific-10 Conference
	Conf			Overall		
Team	W	L	Pct	W	L	Pct
Oregon State	16	7	.696	50	17	.746
Arizona State	14	10	.583	37	21	.638
UCLA	13	10	.565	33	25	.569
Arizona	12	12	.500	27	28	.491
Washington	11	13	.458	36	25	.590
Stanford	11	13	.458	33	27	.500
USC	11	13	.458	25	33	.397
Washington State	10	14	.417	36	23	.610
California	9	15	.375	26	28	.481

Patriot League
	Conf			Overall		
Team	W	L	Pct	W	L	Pct
Bucknell	13	7	.650	24	24	.500
Lehigh	13	7	.650	28	28	.500
Lafayette	11	9	.550	27	24	.529
Army	10	10	.500	30	20	.600
Navy	8	12	.400	32	21	.604
Holy Cross	5	15	.250	16	26	.381

Southeastern Conference
Team	W	L	Pct	W	L	Pct
East
Kentucky	20	10	.667	44	17	.721
Georgia	18	12	.600	47	23	.671
Vanderbilt	16	14	.533	38	27	.585
South Carolina	15	15	.500	41	25	.621
Tennessee	11	18	.379	31	24	.563
Florida	10	20	.333	28	28	.500
West
Alabama	20	10	.667	44	21	.677
Arkansas	18	12	.600	39	21	.650
Ole Miss	17	13	.567	44	22	.667
LSU	13	17	.433	35	24	.593
Mississippi State	12	17	.414	37	23	.617
Auburn	9	21		22	34	.393

Southern Conference
	Conf			Overall		
Team	W	L	Pct	W	L	Pct
Elon	21	6	.778	45	18	.714
College of Charleston	20	7	.741	46	17	.730
Furman	16	11	.593	32	23	.582
Georgia Southern	16	11	.593	31	27	.534
The Citadel	15	12	.556	34	27	.557
Western Carolina	14	13	.519	33	27	.550
UNC Greensboro	13	14	.481	26	33	.441
Appalachian State	9	18	.333	24	31	.436
Davidson	6	21	.222	18	33	.353
Wofford	5	22	.185	20	37	.351

Southland Conference
	Conf			Overall		
Team	W	L	Pct	W	L	Pct
McNeese State	22	8	.733	35	20	.636
Texas–San Antonio	20	10	.667	37	22	.627
Texas State	20	10	.667	29	30	.492
Lamar	19	11	.633	35	23	.603
Texas–Arlington	16	12	.571	29	36	.446
Northwestern State	15	15	.500	33	28	.541
Southeastern Louisiana	14	16	.467	23	32	.418
Louisiana–Monroe	12	16	.429	18	37	.327
Sam Houston State	12	18	.400	23	31	.426
Stephen F. Austin	7	23	.233	15	41	.268
Nicholls State	6	24	.200	13	40	.245

Southwestern Athletic Conference
	Conf			Overall		
Team	W	L	Pct	W	L	Pct
East
Mississippi Valley State	20	4	.833	24	32	.429
Alcorn State	15	9	.625	26	21	.553
Jackson State	14	10	.583	22	17	.564
Alabama State	7	16	.304	11	34	.244
Alabama A&M	3	20	.130	8	27	.229
West
Prairie View A&M	17	7	.708	33	22	.600
Southern	16	8	.667	26	20	.565
Texas Southern	15	9		19	30	.388
Arkansas–Pine Bluff	9	15	.375	15	29	.341
Grambling State	3	21	.125	6	38	.136

Sun Belt Conference
	Conf			Overall		
Team	W	L	Pct	W	L	Pct
Troy	20	4	.833	47	16	.746
Louisiana–Lafayette	19	5	.792	39	20	.661
South Alabama	16	7	.696	39	21	.650
Florida International	12	12	.500	36	24	.600
New Orleans	12	12	.500	30	28	.517
Middle Tennessee	10	13	.435	30	25	.545
Arkansas State	7	16	.304	22	30	.423
Western Kentucky	5	18	.217	22	30	.423
Arkansas–Little Rock	5	19	.208	24	30	.444

Western Athletic Conference
	Conf			Overall		
Team	W	L	Pct	W	L	Pct
Fresno State	18	6	.750	45	18	.714
Hawaii	17	6	.739	45	17	.726
San Jose State	12	12	.500	33	26	.559
Nevada	11	12	.478	26	28	.481
Louisiana Tech	11	13	.458	33	25	.569
Sacramento State	8	16	.333	20	37	.351
New Mexico State	6	18	.250	19	36	.345

West Coast Conference
	Conf			Overall		
Team	W	L	Pct	W	L	Pct
Pepperdine	15	6	.714	42	21	.667
San Francisco	15	6	.714	39	23	.629
San Diego	13	8	.619	33	25	.569
Loyola Marymount	11	10	.524	24	32	.429
Gonzaga	9	12	.429	29	24	.547
Santa Clara	9	12	.429	28	26	.519
Saint Mary's	9	12	.429	26	25	.510
Portland	3	18	.143	15	37	.288

Division I Independents
Team	W	L	Pct
Savannah State	30	19	.612
Dallas Baptist	33	23	.589
NYIT	31	22	.585
Longwood	23	27	.460
Texas–Pan American	24	29	.453
South Dakota State	23	29	.442
IPFW	21	28	.429
Northern Colorado	21	30	.412
Texas A&M–Corpus Christi	20	31	.392
UC Davis	18	34	.346
Utah Valley	19	37	.339
Hawaii–Hilo	15	34	.306
North Dakota State	12	41	.226

Team won the conference tournament and the automatic bid to the NCAA tournament
Conference does not have conference tournament, so team won the autobid for finishing in first
Team received at-large bid to NCAA tournament

== College World Series ==
The 2006 season marked the sixtieth NCAA baseball tournament, which culminated with the eight team College World Series. The College World Series was held in Omaha, Nebraska. The eight teams played a double-elimination format, with Oregon State claiming their first championship with a two games to one series win over North Carolina in the final.

=== Bracket ===
First round
1	Clemson	8
8	Georgia Tech	4
North Carolina	7^{13}
5	Cal State Fullerton	5
8	Georgia Tech	5
5	Cal State Fullerton	7
2	Rice	6
7	Georgia	4
Miami (FL)	11
Oregon State	1
7	Georgia	3
Oregon State	5

Second round
1	Clemson	0
North Carolina	2
5	Cal State Fullerton	7
1	Clemson	6
2	Rice	3
Miami (FL)	2
Oregon State	8
Miami (FL)	1

Semifinals
North Carolina	6	—
5	Cal State Fullerton	5	—
2	Rice	0	0
Oregon State	5	2

Finals
North Carolina	4	7	2
Oregon State	3	11	3
