= 2018 Mid-Eastern Athletic Conference baseball tournament =

- Teams: 6
- Format: Double-elimination tournament
- Finals site: Sliwa Stadium; Daytona Beach, FL
- Champions: North Carolina A&T (2nd title)
- Winning coach: Ben Hall (1st title)
- MVP: Zach McLean (North Carolina A&T)

2018 Mid-Eastern Athletic Conference baseball standings
	Conf.				Overall
Team	W		L	PCT	W		L	PCT
Northern
Coppin State ^{x}‍‍‍	18	–	4	.818	20	–	22	.476
Norfolk State ‍‍‍	13	–	10	.565	18	–	28	.391
Maryland Eastern Shore ‍‍‍	8	–	16	.333	12	–	40	.231
Delaware State ‍‍‍	7	–	16	.304	9	–	35	.205
Southern
North Carolina A&T ^{x}‍‍‍	16	–	8	.667	29	–	23	.558
Florida A&M ‍‍‍	15	–	9	.625	25	–	28	.472
Bethune-Cookman ‍‍‍	14	–	10	.583	20	–	32	.385
North Carolina Central ‍‍‍	11	–	13	.458	28	–	24	.538
Savannah State ‍‍‍	4	–	20	.167	7	–	34	.171
x – Division champion ‡ – Tournament champion As of May 16, 2018; Rankings from Collegiate Baseball

The 2018 Mid-Eastern Athletic Conference baseball tournament began on May 16 and ended on May 19 at Sliwa Stadium on the campus of Embry-Riddle Aeronautical University in Daytona Beach, Florida. It is a six-team double elimination tournament. As winner, North Carolina A&T claimed the Mid-Eastern Athletic Conference's automatic bid to the 2018 NCAA Division I baseball tournament. Bethune-Cookman has claimed sixteen of the nineteen tournament championships, with Florida A&M winning in 2015, Savannah State in 2013 and North Carolina A&T earning the 2005 title.

== Format and seeding ==
The top three teams from each of the MEAC's two divisions will be seeded one through three based on regular season records, with first round matchups of the second seed from the North and the third seed from the South and the second seed from the South against the third seed from the North. The top seeds will receive a single bye and play the winners of the first round matchups, while the losers will play an elimination game.

== Bracket ==
First round Wednesday, May 16	Second round Thursday, May 17	Third round Friday, May 18	Championship; Saturday, May 19
1N	Coppin State	5
2S	Florida A&M	14	2S	Florida A&M	3
3N	Maryland-Eastern Shore	4	1N	Coppin State	7
1S	North Carolina A&T	15
1S	North Carolina A&T	12
2N	Norfolk State	8	2N	Norfolk State	3
3S	Bethune-Cookman	7
1S	North Carolina A&T	12
3S	Bethune-Cookman	9
Lower round 1	Lower round 2	Lower round 3	Lower final
3S	Bethune-Cookman	8
2S	Florida A&M	3	1N	Coppin State	3
2N	Norfolk State	3	3S	Bethune-Cookman	9
3N	Maryland-Eastern Shore	3	3S	Bethune-Cookman	12
3S	Bethune-Cookman	13
