= 2022 Mid-Eastern Athletic Conference baseball tournament =

- Teams: 4
- Format: Double-elimination tournament
- Finals site: Marty L. Miller Field; Norfolk, Virginia
- Champions: Coppin State (2nd title)
- Winning coach: Sherman Reed
- Television: HBCU Go

2022 Mid-Eastern Athletic Conference baseball standings
	Conf.				Overall
Team	W		L	PCT	W		L	PCT
Delaware State ‍†‍‍	19	–	14	.576	26	–	23	.531
Coppin State ‍‍‡‍^{y}	17	–	13	.567	24	–	29	.453
Maryland Eastern Shore ‍‍‍	15	–	18	.455	17	–	38	.309
Norfolk State ‍‍‍	12	–	18	.400	15	–	32	.319
‡ – Tournament champion y – Invited to the NCAA tournament As of March 12, 2025; Rankings from D1Baseball

The 2022 Mid-Eastern Athletic Conference baseball tournament was played from May 19 to May 21 at Marty L. Miller Field on the campus of Norfolk State University in Norfolk, Virginia. It was a four-team double elimination tournament. The winner, Coppin State, claimed the Mid-Eastern Athletic Conference's automatic bid to the 2022 NCAA Division I baseball tournament.

It proved to be the last-ever MEAC tournament, at least for the foreseeable future. After the 2022 season, the MEAC merged its baseball league into that of the Northeast Conference (NEC), with the four remaining MEAC baseball schools becoming NEC affiliates.

== Format and seeding ==
The four teams were seeded one through four based on regular season records, with the top seed playing the fourth seed and the other two teams facing off in first-round matchups. The winners advanced in the winners' bracket, while first-round losers played elimination games.

Team	W	L	Pct.	GB	Seed
Delaware State	19	14	.576	—	1
Coppin State	17	13	.567	1.5	2
Maryland Eastern Shore	15	18	.455	4.5	3
Norfolk State	12	18	.400	5.5	4

== Bracket ==
Upper round 1
1	Delaware State	7
4	Norfolk State	6
3	Maryland Eastern Shore	8
2	Coppin State	9
Lower round 1
4	Norfolk State	5
3	Maryland Eastern Shore	12

Upper final
1	Delaware State	5
2	Coppin State	15
Lower final
1	Delaware State	11
3	Maryland Eastern Shore	10

Final
2	Coppin State	3	18
1	Delaware State	4	11
