= Sherman Reed =

American baseball player and coach

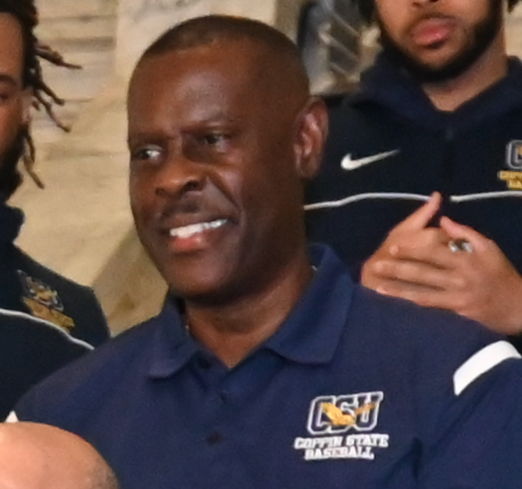
- Reed at the Maryland State House in 2023

Current position
- Title: Head coach
- Team: Coppin State
- Conference: NEC
- Record: 205–490–3

Biographical details
- Born: Baltimore, Maryland, U.S.

Playing career
- 1979–1983: Towson

Coaching career (HC unless noted)
- ????–????: Western Tech HS
- ????–????: Catonsville HS
- 2008–2009: Coppin State (asst.)
- 2011–present: Coppin State

Head coaching record
- Overall: 205–490–3
- Tournaments: NCAA: 0–2

Accomplishments and honors

Championships
- MEAC Tournament (2022)

Awards
- MEAC Coach of the Year (2018)

Sherman Reed is an American baseball coach and former player, who is the head baseball coach of the Coppin State Eagles. He played club baseball at Towson from 1979 to 1983.

== Playing career ==
Reed played club baseball for the Towson Tigers baseball team from 1979 to 1983. He then went on to play ten years of independent baseball.

== Coaching career ==
Reed served as a coach at Western School of Technology and Environmental Science and Catonsville High School. Reed also spent the 2008 and 2009 seasons as an assistant at Coppin State.

On July 9, 2010, Reed was named the head coach of the Coppin State baseball team. On May 9, 2018, Reed broke the Coppin State record for career wins with his 84th win. In 2018, Reed lead the Eagles to their first ever Mid-Eastern Athletic Conference (MEAC) Northern Division title. On May 15, 2018, Reed was named the MEAC Coach of the Year.

== Personal life ==
Reed's wife is named Dorothy. Together, they had at least one son, Sherman Jr.

Reed's son, Sherman Jr., played college baseball at Southern University. He was shot and killed in his Violetville home in August 2019 at 31 years old.

== Head coaching record ==
Record table
Season	Team	Overall	Conference	Standing	Postseason
Coppin State Eagles (Mid-Eastern Athletic Conference) (2011–2022)
2011	Coppin State	5–39	2–16	7th	
2012	Coppin State	1–53	0–24	4th (Northern)	MEAC tournament
2013	Coppin State	18–33	11–13	3rd (Northern)	MEAC tournament
2014	Coppin State	12–34	9–15	3rd (Northern)	MEAC tournament
2015	Coppin State	3–38–2	2–22	4th (Northern)	
2016	Coppin State	14–38	8–16	3rd (Northern)	MEAC tournament
2017	Coppin State	11–31	8–15	4th (Northern)	
2018	Coppin State	21–23–1	18–4	1st (Northern)	MEAC tournament
2019	Coppin State	24–24	15–9	2nd (Northern)	MEAC tournament
2020	Coppin State	3–10	0–0		Season canceled due to COVID-19
2021	Coppin State	10–29	7–20	3rd (North)	
2022	Coppin State	24–30	17–13	2nd	NCAA Regional
Coppin State:			97–167		
Coppin State Eagles (Northeast Conference) (2023–present)
2023	Coppin State	21–31	14–16	T-6th	
2024	Coppin State	12–33	11–21	10th	
2025	Coppin State	15–34	13–17	8th	
2026	Coppin State	11–37	11–22	10th	
Coppin State:		205–490–3	49–76		
Total:		205–490–3			
National champion Postseason invitational champion Conference regular season champion Conference regular season and conference tournament champion Division regular season champion Division regular season and conference tournament champion Conference tournament champion

== See also ==
- List of current NCAA Division I baseball coaches
