= James H. Williams =

American football and baseball coach, athletics administrator (1920–1999)

Biographical details
- Born: 1920
- Died: December 21, 1999 (aged 79); Phoenix, Arizona, U.S.

Playing career

Football
- c. 1940: North Carolina College

Basketball
- c. 1940: North Carolina College

Baseball
- c. 1940: North Carolina College

Boxing
- c. 1940: North Carolina College
- Position: Fullback (football)

Coaching career (HC unless noted)

Football
- 1946–1951: Elizabeth City State
- c. 1953: Bethune–Cookman (assistant)

Baseball
- 1970–1976: Delaware State
- 1979–1984: Delaware State

Administrative career (AD unless noted)
- 1962–1977: Delaware State

Head coaching record
- Overall: 23–16–4 (football); 171–167–2 (baseball)

Accomplishments and honors

Championships
- Football; 1 EIAC (1948)

James H. "Fuzzy" Williams (1920 – December 21, 1999) was an American college football and college baseball coach and athletics administrator. He was served as the head football coach at Elizabeth City State Teachers College—now known as Elizabeth City State University—in Elizabeth City, North Carolina, from 1946 to 1951, compiling a record of 23–16–4. Williams had two stints as the head baseball coach at Delaware State College—now known as Delaware State University—from 1970 to 1976 and 1979 to 1984, tallying a mark of 171–167–2. He was also the Delaware State's athletic director from 1962 to 1977.

Williams attended Washington Graded and High School in Raleigh, North Carolina before moving on to North Carolina College for Negroes—now known as North Carolina Central University—in Durham, North Carolina, where he competed in football, basketball, baseball, and boxing. He later received a master's degree from the University of Michigan.

Williams was appointed head football coach at Elizabeth City State in 1946 following a three-year hiatus for the school's football team during World War II. In 1952, he was appointed head of the physical education department at Bethune–Cookman College—now known as Bethune–Cookman University—in Daytona Beach, Florida. At Bethune–Cookman, he assisted Bunky Matthews in coaching the football team. In 1962, Williams was hired as Delaware State as athletic director, assistant professor of health and physical education, and head of the department of health and physical education.

Williams died on December 21, 1999, in Phoenix, Arizona, at the age of 79.

== Head coaching record ==
=== Football ===
| Year | Team | Overall | Conference | Standing | Bowl/playoffs |
|---|---|---|---|---|---|
Elizabeth City State Pirates (Eastern Intercollegiate Athletic Conference) (1946–1951)
| 1946 | Elizabeth City State | 2–4 | | | |
| 1947 | Elizabeth City State | 5–2 | | | |
| 1948 | Elizabeth City State | 5–1–1 | 4–0–1 | 1st | |
| 1949 | Elizabeth City State | 4–3–1 | 3–2–1 | 4th | |
| 1950 | Elizabeth City State | 4–2–2 | | | |
| 1951 | Elizabeth City State | 3–4 | | | |
| Elizabeth City State: | | 23–16–4 | | | |
| Total: | | 23–16–4 | | | |
National championship Conference title Conference division title or championship game berth
