= Moore–Kittles Field =

Baseball venue in Tallahassee, Florida

- Interactive map of Moore–Kittles Field
- Full name: Oscar A. Moore–Costa Kittles Field
- Location: Campbell Street and Wahnish Way, Tallahassee, Florida, USA
- Coordinates: 30.418683°N 84.291562°W
- Owner: Florida A&M University
- Operator: Florida A&M University
- Capacity: 500
- Surface: Natural grass
- Scoreboard: Electronic

Construction
- Built: 1983

Tenant
- Florida A&M Rattlers baseball (NCAA DI SWAC) (1983-present)

Oscar A. Moore–Costa Kittles Field is a baseball venue in Tallahassee, Florida, United States. It is home to the Florida A&M Rattlers baseball team of the NCAA Division I SWAC. Built in 1983, it has a capacity of 500 spectators. It features a natural grass surface, stadium lighting, dugouts, and a press box.

It is named for former Florida A&M baseball coaches Oscar A. Moore and Costa Kittles. Combined, the coaches won over 500 games and 14 conference titles. Moore was inducted into the university's athletic Hall of Fame in 1978, as was Kittles in 1982.

== See also ==
- List of NCAA Division I baseball venues
