= Richard Skeel =

American college administrator and baseball coach

Current position
- Title: Senior Associate Athletic Director
- Team: Dalton State Roadrunners

Biographical details
- Education: Purdue

Coaching career (HC unless noted)
- 1980–1981: Albany
- 1991–1992: Cincinnati
- 1994–1996: Bethune-Cookman (asst.)
- 1997–1999: Bethune-Cookman

Administrative career (AD unless noted)
- 2000–2012: Stetston (Sr. Assoc.)
- 2012–Present: Dalton State (Sr. Assoc.)

Richard Skeel is an American college administrator and baseball coach, serving as the senior associate athletic director at Dalton State College in Dalton, Georgia, United States. Dalton State reestablished its athletic department for the NAIA competition, beginning in the 2013–14 academic year.

Skeel previously served as head baseball coach at Cincinnati and Bethune-Cookman.
