= Marty L. Miller Field =

Baseball venue in Norfolk, Virginia

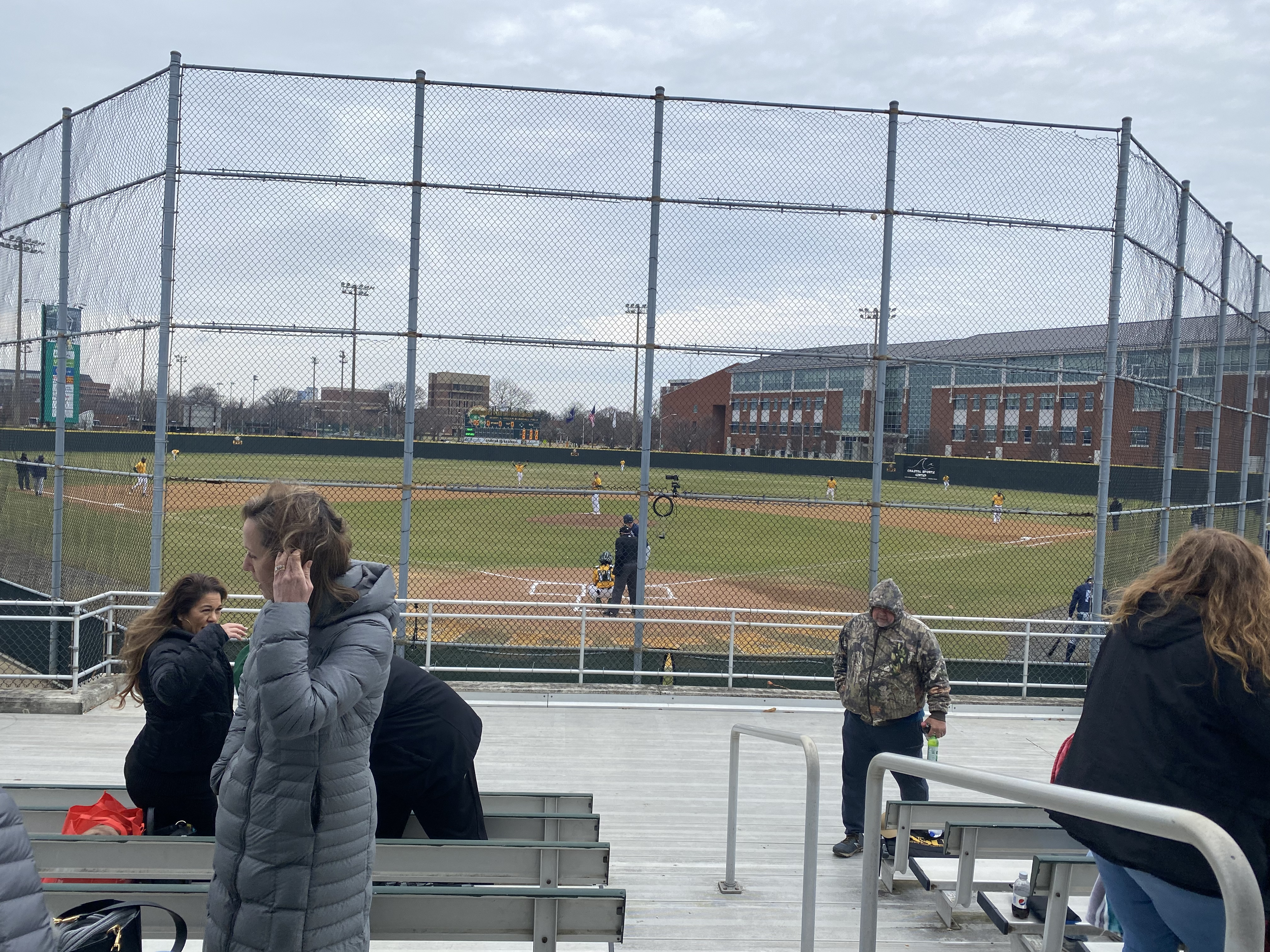
- Interactive map of Marty L. Miller Field
- Location: Presidential Boulevard and South Campus Drive, Norfolk, Virginia, USA
- Coordinates: 36.846352°N 76.262844°W
- Owner: Norfolk State University
- Operator: Norfolk State University
- Capacity: 1,500
- Surface: Natural grass
- Scoreboard: Electronic
- Field size: 330 ft. (LF); 395 ft. (LCF); 402 ft. (CF); 395 ft. (RCF); 318 ft. (RF)

Construction
- Built: 1997

Tenants
- Norfolk State Spartans baseball (NCAA DI NEC) (1997-present); MEAC Tournament (2006-2008, 2012)

Marty L. Miller Field is a baseball venue in Norfolk, Virginia, United States. It is home to the Norfolk State Spartans baseball team of the NCAA Division I Northeast Conference. The venue is named for former Norfolk State baseball coach Marty Miller. Built in 1997, it has a capacity of 1,500 spectators.

== Naming ==
Following its 1997 construction, Miller Field was dedicated to Marty L. Miller, who coached the Norfolk State baseball program from 1973 to 2004. Miller, who also served as athletic director, had a career record of 718-543-3.

== Features ==
The playing field itself features a natural grass surface, gravel warning track, drainage system, bullpens, and stadium lighting. The venue also has bleacher seating, an electronic scoreboard, and a press box.

== Events ==
The venue hosted the 2006, 2007, 2008, and 2012 Mid-Eastern Athletic Conference baseball tournaments, all won by Bethune-Cookman.

== See also ==
- List of NCAA Division I baseball venues
