= Jackie Robinson Ballpark =

Historic baseball field in Daytona Beach, Florida, United States

- The Jack
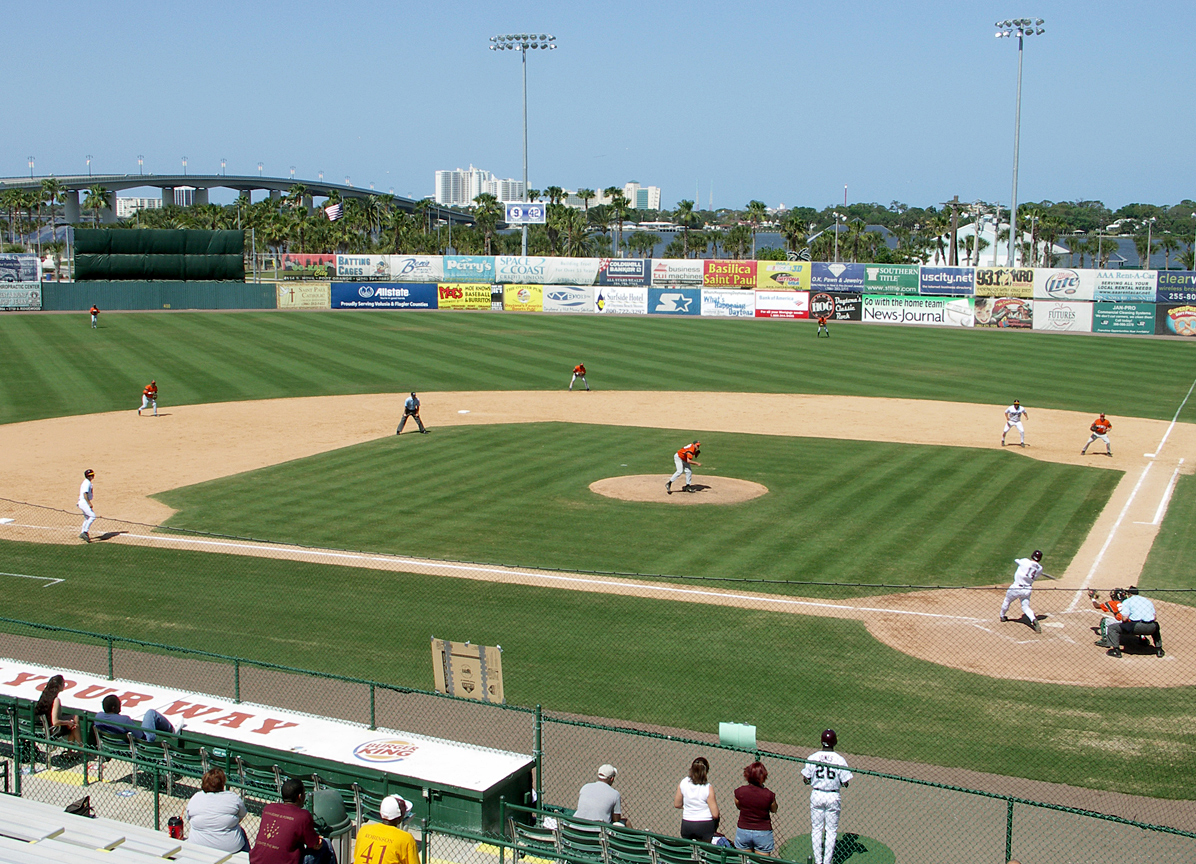
- Interactive map of Jackie Robinson Ballpark
- Full name: Jackie Robinson Ballpark
- Former names: Daytona City Island Ballpark (1914–1988)
- Address: 105 East Orange Avenue
- Location: Daytona Beach, Florida
- Coordinates: 29°12′34″N 81°1′0″W
- Owner: City of Daytona Beach
- Operator: Checkerboard Baseball, LLC
- Capacity: 4,200
- Surface: FieldTurf
- Field size: Left Field: 317 ft Center Field: 400 ft Right Field: 325 ft

Construction
- Opened: June 4, 1914
- Renovated: 1930, 1951, 1962, 1973, 1999
- Architects: Fuquay & Gheen, Inc.

Tenants
- Daytona Beach Islanders/Dodgers/Astros/Admirals (1920–1924, 1928, 1936–1941, 1946–1973, 1977–1987); St. Louis Cardinals (spring training) (1925–1937); Minneapolis Millers (spring training) (1940); Brooklyn Dodgers (spring training) (1947); Baltimore Orioles (spring training) (1955); Montreal Expos (spring training) (1973–1980); Bethune–Cookman Wildcats baseball (1993–present); Daytona Cubs (1993–2014); Daytona Tortugas (2015–present)
- City Island Ball Park
- U.S. National Register of Historic Places
- Location within Volusia County Location within Florida Location within the United States
- Built: 1914 (ball field); 1929 (grandstand)
- MPS: Daytona Beach Multiple Property Submission
- NRHP reference No.: 98001253
- Added to NRHP: October 22, 1998

The Jackie Robinson Ballpark (also known as Jackie Robinson Stadium or City Island Ball Park) is a historic baseball field in Daytona Beach, Florida, United States. It is located at 105 East Orange Avenue on City Island, in the Halifax River.

== Overview ==
The ballpark, originally known as City Island Ball Park, opened in 1914. It consisted of a baseball field and a set of wooden bleachers. The present day grandstand and press box were built in 1962. It is the home of the Daytona Tortugas and the Bethune–Cookman Wildcats. The Daytona Tortugas were founded in 1993. They have won six Florida State League championships, 1994, 2000, 2004, 2008, 2011, and 2013.

The Bethune–Cookman Wildcats have also achieved recent success, including six consecutive Mid-Eastern Athletic Conference (MEAC) baseball championships from 1999 to 2004, and seven more in 2006–2012.

== History ==
=== Baseball ===
Daytona Beach and the stadium were the first Florida city to allow Jackie Robinson to play during the 1946 season's spring training. Robinson had been signed to play for the Triple-A Montreal Royals who held spring training in Florida with Brooklyn Dodgers. Both Jacksonville and Sanford locked their stadiums to the Royals and forced the cancellation of scheduled exhibition games due to local ordinances which prohibited "mixed" athletics.

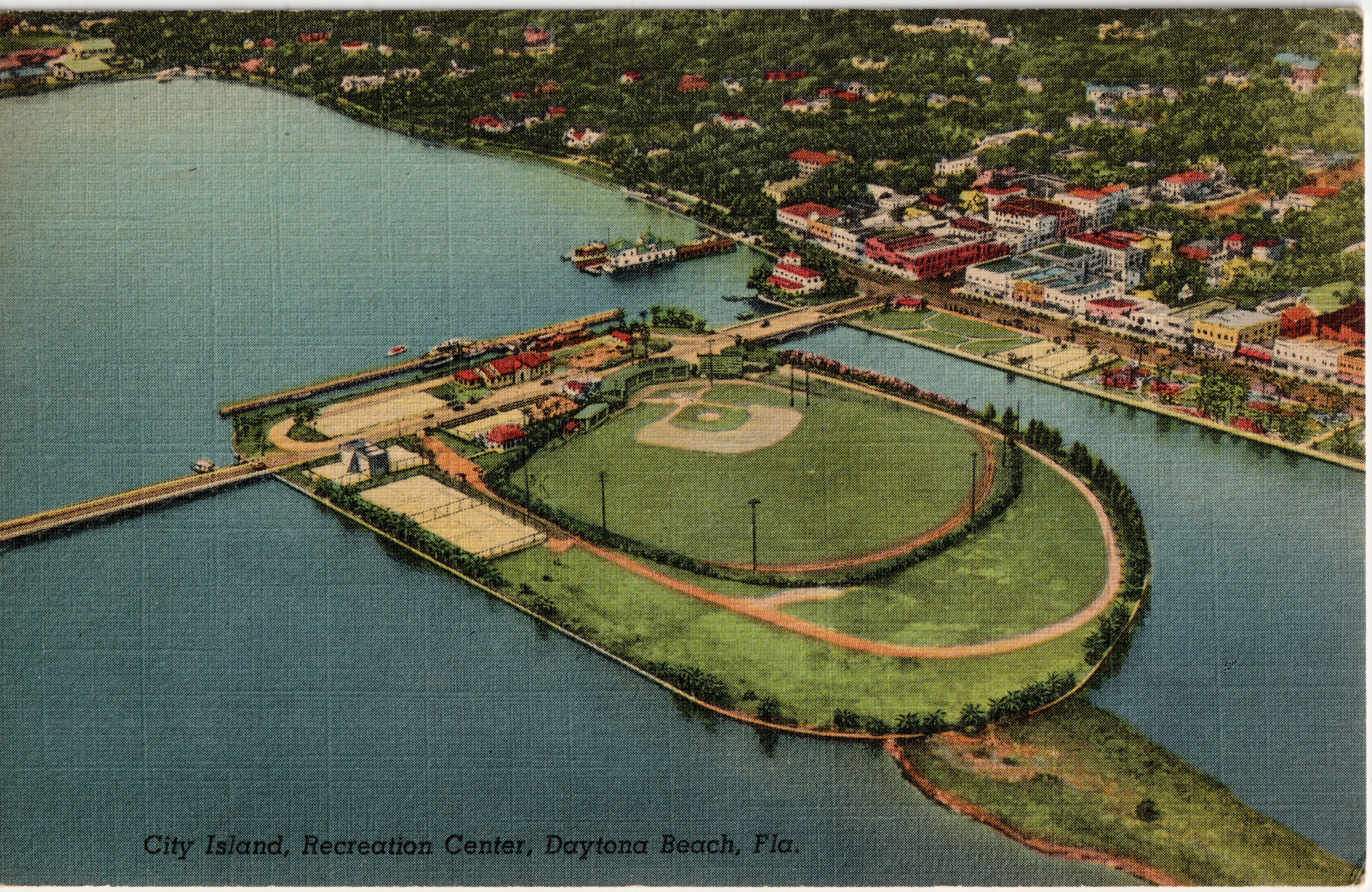
City Island Recreation Center, Daytona Beach, Florida, with baseball field, today Jackie Robinson Ballpark, circa 1940s

Daytona Beach permitted the game, which was played on March 17, 1946. This contributed to Robinson breaking Major League Baseball's color barrier the following year when he joined the Dodgers. The refusal by Jacksonville, previously the Dodgers' spring training home, led the team to host spring training in Daytona in 1947 and build Dodgertown in Vero Beach for the 1948 season. A statue of Robinson is now located at the south entrance to the ballpark.

The ballpark was previously the home field of the Daytona Beach Islanders (1920–1924, 1936–1941, 1946–1966, 1977, 1985–1986), Daytona Beach Dodgers (1968–1973), and Daytona Beach Astros (1978–1984). The major league Montreal Expos conducted their spring training at the park from 1973 to 1980.

As of the 2021 season, Jackie Robinson Ballpark is the oldest active ballpark in Minor League Baseball.

=== Outside of baseball ===
The stadium sustained heavy damage during Hurricane Donna in 1960. A $2 million historic renovation project was accelerated after Hurricane Floyd ripped off the metal roofs over the seating in 1999. In 2004, the ballpark suffered moderate damage during Hurricane Charley, causing several home games to be moved to Melching Field at Conrad Park in nearby DeLand.

On October 22, 1998, the stadium was added to the United States National Register of Historic Places. This property is part of the Daytona Beach Multiple Property Submission, a Multiple Property Submission to the National Register.

On May 12, 2018, the stadium hosted a concert by rapper Nelly with Bone Thugs-n-Harmony and Juvenile as the opening acts.

In 2025, the park was named a National Commemorative Site and added to the African American Civil Rights Network.

== See also ==
- List of NCAA Division I baseball venues
