= Savannah State Tigers and Lady Tigers =

Savannah State Tigers
- University: Savannah State University
- NCAA: Division II
- Conference: SIAC (primary)
- Athletic director: Opio Mashariki
- Location: Savannah, Georgia
- Varsity teams: 13 (6 men's, 7 women's)
- Football stadium: Ted Wright Stadium
- Basketball arena: Tiger Arena
- Baseball stadium: Tiger Baseball Field
- Softball stadium: Lady Tiger Softball Field
- Tennis venue: Tiger Tennis Courts
- Nickname: Tigers and Lady Tigers
- Colors: Burnt orange and reflex blue
- Website: ssuathletics.com

The Savannah State Tigers and Lady Tigers are the men's and women's intercollegiate athletic teams that play for Savannah State University in Savannah, Georgia.

== Conference affiliation ==
Savannah State University holds membership in the NCAA Division II (as members of the SIAC) and participates in the following sports: football, baseball, basketball (men and women), cross-country (men and women), tennis (men and women), track and field (men and women), volleyball (women only), golf (men), and softball (women). On March 20, 2010, the Tigers were accepted as provisional members of the Mid-Eastern Athletic Conference (MEAC) beginning on July 1, 2010. On September 8, 2011, the university was confirmed as a full member of the MEAC Conference, making the Tigers eligible to participate in all conference championships and earn the conference's automatic berth to NCAA postseason competition in all sponsored sports. Before moving to Division I-AA, Savannah State was a member of the Southern Intercollegiate Athletic Conference in the NCAA Division II (1981–2005), NCAA Division II and the Southeastern Athletic Conference in the NAIA (1929–1961).

Savannah State announced on April 17, 2017, that all of its intercollegiate athletic programs were going to be reclassified to NCAA Division II, citing that maintaining Division I status was not financially feasible. Just under eight months later on December 7, the university revealed its plans to apply for re-entry to the Southern Intercollegiate Athletic Conference by February 1, 2018. These plans were later approved and Savannah State was re-admitted into the SIAC on July 2, 2019.

== Team colors ==
The official school colors for Savannah State are Burnt Orange and Reflex Blue. White is often used as a secondary color and for alternate jerseys.

== Organization ==
Athletics at Savannah State University are administered by the Savannah State University Athletic Department. The department is headed by an athletic director who is responsible for the department's oversight and all matters related to the school's 16 NCAA Division I sports teams for men and women. The department dedicates about $2 million per year for its sports teams and facilities.

The current athletic director is Opio Mashariki

== Sports sponsored ==
Men's sports	Women's sports
Baseball	Basketball
Basketball	Cross country
Cross country	Golf
Football	Softball
Golf	Tennis
Track and field^{1}	Track and field^{1}
	Volleyball
^{1} – includes both indoor and outdoor.

=== Baseball ===
The head coach is Florentino "Tino" Burgos, who was hired on December 3, 2024, after spending eight seasons as the head coach at Florida Memorial University, where he was that program's winningest head coach.

==== Conference championships and NCAA playoffs ====
- The Savannah State Tigers finished as SIAC baseball champions for five consecutive seasons (1995–1999).
- In 1999, the Tigers were the No. 4 seed in the NCAA Division II South Regional baseball Tournament
- In 2013, the Tigers were the co-champions of the MEAC Southern Division and won the conference baseball tournament and the conferences automatic NCAA bid.
- In 2024, Savannah State fell in the SIAC Championship Game to Edward Waters. However, due to EWU being in the final year of their three-year transition to the NCAA Division II, Savannah Stat received the SIAC's automatic bid to the NCAA Division II National Tournament, earning the No. 8 seed in the South Region.

==== Season-by-season record ====
NCAA Division I Independent SIAC (NCAA Division II) NCAA Division III NAIA Southeastern

Season	Wins	Losses	Conference Record	Head coach	Notes	References
2010			0-0	Carlton Hardy		
2009	25	26	0-0	Carlton Hardy		
2008			0-0	Carlton Hardy		
2007	30	23	0-0	Carlton Hardy		
2006	30	19	0-0	Carlton Hardy		
2005			0-0	Jamie Rigdon		
2004			0-0	Jamie Rigdon		
2003			0-0	Jamie Rigdon		
2002				Jamie Rigdon		
2001				Jamie Rigdon		
2000				Jamie Rigdon		
1999	38	10		Jamie Rigdon	SIAC Champions and #4 seed in the NCAA Division II South Regional baseball Tournament	
1998				Jamie Rigdon	SIAC Champions; Savannah State placed on four years probation and scholarships reduced in six sports	
1997				Jamie Rigdon	SIAC Champions	
1996				Jamie Rigdon	SIAC Champions	
1995				Wesley McGriff	SIAC Champions	
1994				Wesley McGriff		
1993				Wesley McGriff		
1992				Wesley McGriff		
1991						
Totals				NCAA Division I-AA Independent results		
Totals				NCAA Division II results		
Totals				NCAA Division III results		
Totals				NAIA results		
Totals				Regular season results		
Totals				Playoff results		
Totals				All games including playoffs		

==== Team awards and NCAA records ====
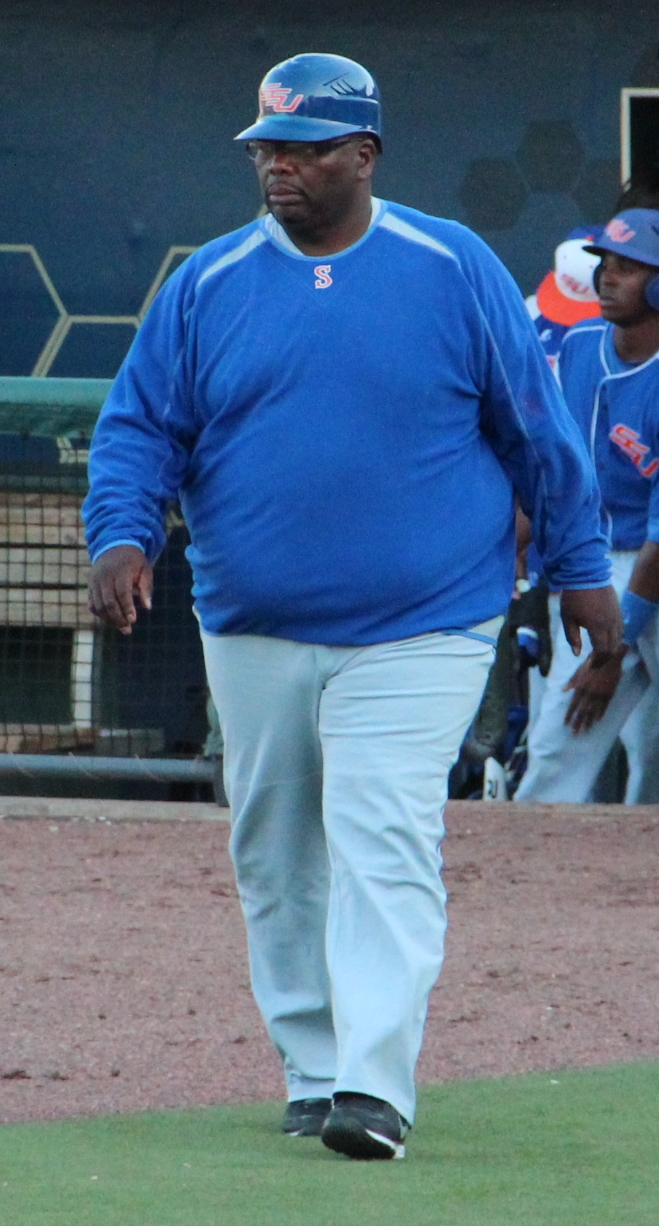
Head baseball coach Carlton Hardy, 2014

- Savannah State holds the NCAA Division II records of 46 consecutive victories in baseball and 46 consecutive victories to start of a season (2000). The team also hold the NCAA Division II records of 12.59 average runs per game in a season (2000), 58 total triples in a season (1998) and 1.18 average triples per game in a season (1998).
- Theophalus Gregory established the NCAA Division III record of 1.92 average stolen bases per game in 1974 as a member of the Savannah State baseball team.
- Gerald Smith, held the 2005 NCAA Division I top slugging percentage (.785) as a member of the Savannah State baseball team.
- Savannah State baseball player Brett Higgins (2000) holds the NCAA Division II record of 32 doubles in a season (in 49 games) with four other players and led the NCAA in RBIs (93), slugging percentage (1.010), and total bases (193) in 2000.
- Willie Melendez, former Savannah State baseball player holds the NCAA Division II record of 16 triples in a season (1998).

==== Notable players and coaches ====
Some notable Savannah State baseball players and coaches include:

Name	Class year	Position	Notability	Reference(s)
Mark Eric Alvarez		Pitcher	Signed as a non-drafted free agent with the Pittsburgh Pirates in 2006	
Brandon Jackson		Outfielder	16th round selection of the 1999 MLB draft by the Los Angeles Angels of Anaheim	
Kyle McGowin		Pitcher	First Team All-American in 2013, 5th round selection of the 2013 MLB draft by the Los Angeles Angels of Anaheim	
Jeff Urgelles		Catcher	Minor League Baseball player and Major League Baseball coach for the Miami Marlins	

=== Men's basketball ===
Savannah State competes in NCAA Division II as a member of the Southern Intercollegiate Athletic Conference since July 2019, and plays home games in Tiger Arena on the university campus.

The school gained notoriety when they finished the 2004–2005 men's basketball season a winless 0–28, the first Division I team to do so since Prairie View A&M University in 1991–1992. The Tigers were the 2011–12 MEAC regular season champions and received an automatic bid into the 2012 NIT, their first ever appearance in any Division I tournament as a Division I member. The team posted a 21–10 overall mark and lead the MEAC in scoring defense, only allowing 58.9 points per game and were second in the conference in scoring margin (+5.4).

The Tigers defeated Benedict College, 76–62, to win the 2022 SIAC Men's Basketball Tournament.

Savannah State won their second SIAC Men's Basketball Tournament Championship in 2025, when they upset Tuskegee 67-66 in the title game.

=== Women's basketball ===
Savannah State Lady Tigers basketball is a Mid-Eastern Athletic Conference (MEAC) member. They currently play in Division I of the National Collegiate Athletic Association (NCAA).

The Lady Tigers started playing in 1928 and in 1974 joined Division II. They compiled a 339–394 record in Division II before moving on to Division I in 2002. In Division I, the Lady Tigers are 148–260. The Lady Tigers won 6 total SEAC Championships.

The Lady Tigers will move back to Division II Southern Intercollegiate Athletic Conference (SIAC) after the 2018–19 season

=== Football ===
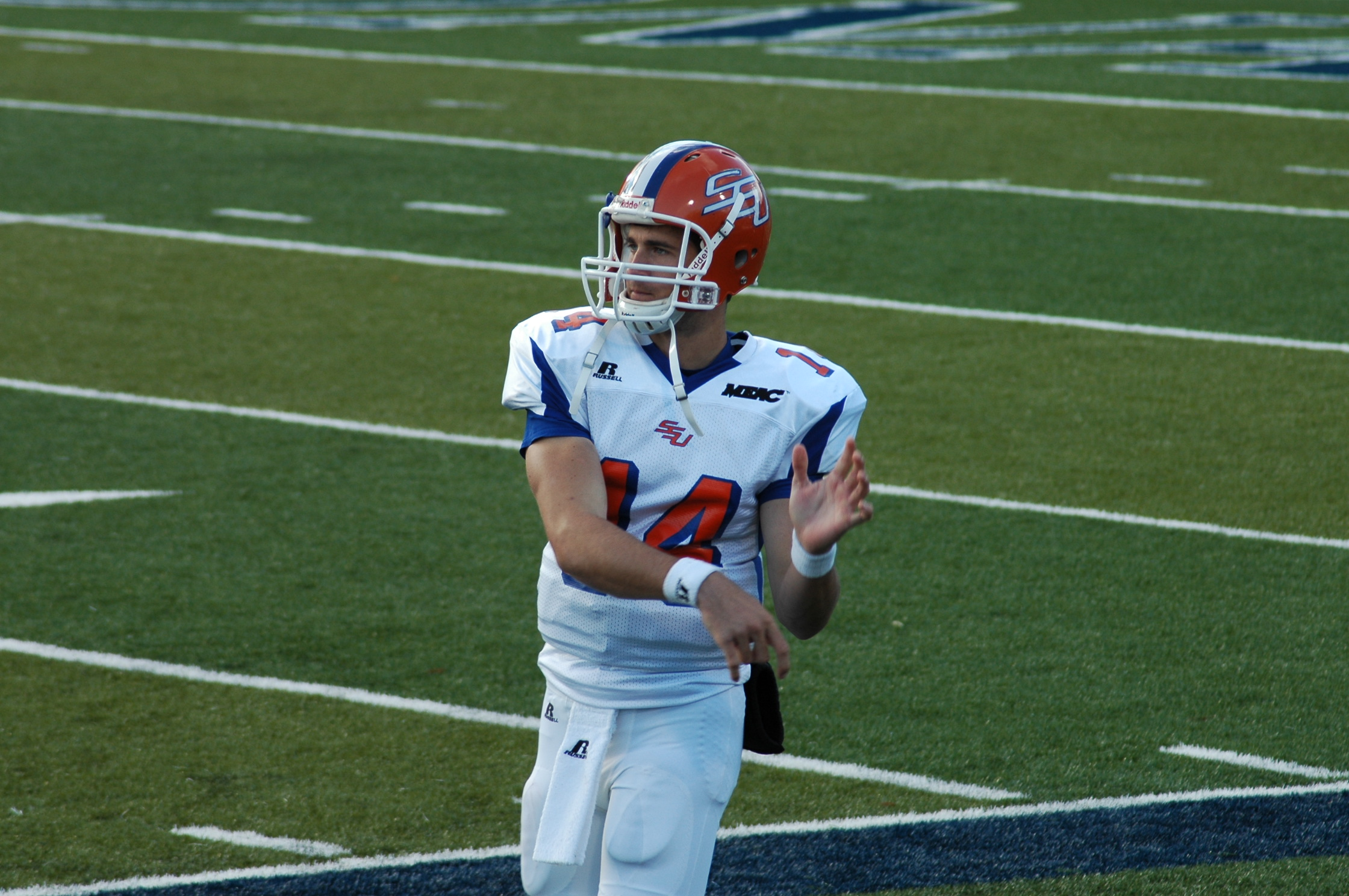
Sophomore quarterback A.J. Defillips warms up during the Savannah State vs. Old Dominion game. (Taken on November 6, 2010)

The football team is traditionally the most popular sport at Savannah State. The games are played at Ted A. Wright Stadium. Since moving to NCAA Division I – FCS in 2000, the Tigers have compiled a 17–88 record as of the 2009–2010 season. Prior to moving to Division I – FCS, the team compiled a 97–108–4 record in NCAA Division II (1981–2000), a 15–20–0 record in NCAA Division III (1973–1980) and a 1–1–0 record as a member of the NAIA.

=== Women's tennis ===
The current coach is Don Andrews who entered his first season as head coach in 2008.

==== Team awards and records ====
The Women's Tennis Team won the SIAC championship in 1991, 1994, 1996, 1997 and 1998.

In 2014, the Women's Tennis team set the program record for Division I wins.

The Women's tennis team started playing in 1984–85. They joined the MEAC during the 2011–12 season.

=== Women's volleyball ===
The current head coach is Jolanta Graham who replaced Schannon Gamble in 2012.

Savannah State's Women's volleyball team began play in 1985 before they moved to Division I in 2002. They began MEAC play in 2011.

Savannah State's Women's volleyball has not had much success in their previous 34 seasons.

=== Women's softball ===
The current head coach is Jose Gonzalez who entered his first season in 2008.

In 2012, the Lady Tigers softball team completed their first .500 season and won a MEAC division title.

=== Men's golf ===
The current coach is Art Gelow.

=== Track and field ===
The current coach is Ted Whitaker who entered his first season as head coach in 1999.

== Current facilities ==
Most athletic teams have on-campus facilities for competition, including Ted A. Wright Stadium for football and track and field, and Tiger Arena for basketball and women's volleyball.

Ted A. Wright Stadium is an 8,500 seat multi purpose stadium which opened in 1969. The stadium's name is an homage to former Savannah State Football coach Theodore Wright, who coached the team from 1947 to 1949.

Track and field renovations were made at Ted A.Wright Stadium in the mid 1990s as part of the "Olympic Legacy Package". The "Olympic Legacy Package" included a 400-meter track and competitive field areas.

Tiger Arena is a 5,000-seat multi purpose arena that opened in 2000. Tiger Arena replaced Willcox-Wiley Gymnasium, costing $9.6 million to construct.

== Traditional rivals ==
The traditional rival, in all sports, is in-state Fort Valley State University.

=== Conference championships ===
Season	Sport	Conference	Notes	Ref.
1970	Men's Basketball	SIAC		
1979	Men's Basketball	SIAC	regular season and tournament title	
1980	Men's Basketball	SIAC	regular season and tournament title	
1981	Men's Basketball	SIAC	regular season and tournament title	
1991	Women's Tennis	SIAC		
1994	Women's Tennis	SIAC		
1995	Baseball	SIAC		
1996	Women's Tennis	SIAC		
1996	Baseball	SIAC		
1997	Women's Tennis	SIAC		
1997	Baseball	SIAC		
1998	Baseball	SIAC		
1998	Women's Tennis	SIAC		
1999	Baseball	SIAC		
2012	Men's Basketball	MEAC	regular season conference champions	
2012	Softball	MEAC	Southern Division Conference Champions	
2013	Baseball	MEAC	Southern Division Conference Champions; Conference tournament champions	
2015	Women's Basketball	MEAC	Conference tournament champions	
2022	Men's Basketball	SIAC	Conference tournament champions	
