= Mervyl Melendez =

Puerto Rican college baseball coach (born 1974)

Biographical details
- Born: February 4, 1974 (age 52); Carolina, Puerto Rico

Playing career
- 1993–1996: Bethune–Cookman
- Positions: 3B, P

Coaching career (HC unless noted)
- 1997–1999: Bethune–Cookman (asst.)
- 2000–2011: Bethune–Cookman
- 2012–2016: Alabama State
- 2017–2022: FIU

Head coaching record
- Overall: 663–593
- Tournaments: C-USA: 0–4

Accomplishments and honors

Championships
- 11 Mid-Eastern Athletic Conference baseball tournament

Awards
- 8× MEAC Coach of the Year

Mervyl Samuel Melendez Sr. (born February 4, 1974) is a Puerto Rican baseball coach and former third baseman and relief pitcher.

== Career ==
He played college baseball for the Bethune-Cookman Wildcats from 1993–1996. He then served as the head coach of Bethune-Cookman (2000–2011), the Alabama State Hornets (2012–2016) and the FIU Panthers (2017–2022).

Melendez played for Bethune-Cookman from 1993 through 1996, seeing time at third base and relief pitching. At his playing career's end, he held program records in doubles (30) and batting average (.342). Melendez earned all-conference and all-tournament honors in 1995 and 1996. Following the end of his playing career, Melendez became an assistant coach for the Wildcats. During his tenure as an assistant, the team won the 1999 MEAC Tournament.

Prior to accepting the job at Alabama State, Melendez was the head coach at Bethune-Cookman, leading his alma mater to eleven Mid-Eastern Athletic Conference championships in his twelve seasons. As coach at Bethune-Cookman, Melendez led the team two back-to-back undefeated conference seasons in 2010 and 2011. His teams also won the Mid-Eastern Athletic Conference baseball tournament every year from 2000 through 2011, with the exception of 2005. He won 379 games as coach of the Wildcats, and in 2009 became the second-youngest coach in NCAA history to win 300 games. He resigned following the conclusion of the 2022 season from FIU.

== Head coaching record ==
The following is a table of Melendez's yearly records as an NCAA head baseball coach.

Record table
Season	Team	Overall	Conference	Standing	Postseason
Bethune–Cookman Wildcats (Mid-Eastern Athletic Conference) (2000–2011)
2000	Bethune-Cookman	33–28	10–8	3rd (Southern)	NCAA Regional
2001	Bethune-Cookman	26–34	11–5	1st (Southern)	NCAA Regional
2002	Bethune-Cookman	39–22	16–2	1st (Southern)	NCAA Regional
2003	Bethune-Cookman	30–28	11–5	1st (Southern)	NCAA Regional
2004	Bethune-Cookman	27–28	14–4	1st	NCAA Regional
2005	Bethune-Cookman	22–28	11–6	2nd	
2006	Bethune-Cookman	30–27	15–0	1st	NCAA Regional
2007	Bethune-Cookman	33–27	16–1	1st	NCAA Regional
2008	Bethune-Cookman	36–22	17–1	1st	NCAA Regional
2009	Bethune-Cookman	32–28	16–2	1st	NCAA Regional
2010	Bethune-Cookman	35–22	18–0	1st	NCAA Regional
2011	Bethune-Cookman	36–25	18–0	1st East	NCAA Regional
Bethune-Cookman:		379–319	173–34		
Alabama State Hornets (Southwestern Athletic Conference) (2012–2016)
2012	Alabama State	20–36	14–10	T–2nd (East)	
2013	Alabama State	32–25	18–6	2nd (East)	
2014	Alabama State	37–20	21–3	1st (East)	
2015	Alabama State	31–19	18–6	1st (East)	
2016	Alabama State	38–17	24–0		NCAA Regionals
Alabama State:		158–117	95–25		
FIU Panthers (Conference USA) (2017–2022)
2017	FIU	31–27	15–15	7th	
2018	FIU	26–28	15–13	6th	
2019	FIU	23–32	12–18	T-9th	
2020	FIU	10–5	0–0		Season canceled due to COVID-19
2021	FIU	20–31	11–19	5th (East)	
2022	FIU	16–34	8–22	11th	
FIU:		126–157	61–87		
Total:		663–593			
National champion Postseason invitational champion Conference regular season champion Conference regular season and conference tournament champion Division regular season champion Division regular season and conference tournament champion Conference tournament champion
