= Florida A&M Rattlers baseball =

Florida A&M Rattlers
- 2026 Florida A&M Rattlers baseball team
- University: Florida A&M University
- Head coach: Jamey Shouppe (13th season)
- Conference: Southwestern Athletic Conference
- Location: Tallahassee, Florida
- Home stadium: Moore–Kittles Field (Capacity: 500)
- Nickname: Rattlers
- Colors: Green and orange

NCAA tournament appearances
- 2015, 2019, 2023

Conference tournament champions
- MEAC: 1987, 1988, 1990, 1991, 1992, 1994, 2015, 2019; SWAC: 2023

Conference regular season champions
- MEAC Southern: 2014, 2015, 2016; SWAC East: 2024

The Florida A&M Rattlers baseball team is the varsity intercollegiate athletic team of the Florida A&M University in Tallahassee, Florida, United States. The team competes in the National Collegiate Athletic Association's Division I and is a member of the Southwestern Athletic Conference; previously, they served as a member of the Mid-Eastern Athletic Conference from 1979 to 1984 and 1986 to 2021.

== NCAA tournament ==
Florida A&M has participated in the NCAA Division I baseball tournament three times. They have a record of 0–6.

Year	Region	Round	Opponent	Result
2015	Gainesville Super Regional	Regional	Florida; Florida Atlantic	L 0–19; L 1–8
2019	Chapel Hill Super Regional	Regional	Georgia Tech; Coastal Carolina	L 2–13; L 4–9
2023	Gainesville Super Regional	Regional	Florida; UConn	L 0–3; L 6–9
