= Bethune–Cookman Wildcats baseball =

Bethune–Cookman Wildcats
- 2026 Bethune–Cookman Wildcats baseball team
- Founded: 1969
- University: Bethune–Cookman University
- Head coach: Jonathan Hernandez (8th season)
- Conference: SWAC; East Division
- Location: Daytona Beach, Florida
- Home stadium: Jackie Robinson Ballpark (capacity: 4,200)
- Nickname: Wildcats
- Colors: Maroon and gold

NCAA tournament appearances
- 1999, 2000, 2001, 2002, 2003, 2004, 2006, 2007, 2008, 2009, 2010, 2011, 2017, 2025

Conference tournament champions
- 1999, 2000, 2001, 2002, 2003, 2004, 2006, 2007, 2008, 2009, 2010, 2011, 2017, 2025

Conference regular season champions
- 1985, 1996, 1997, 1999, 2000, 2001, 2002, 2003, 2004, 2006, 2007, 2008, 2009, 2010, 2011, 2017, 2025, 2026

The Bethune–Cookman Wildcats baseball team is a varsity intercollegiate athletic team of Bethune–Cookman University in Daytona Beach, Florida, United States. The team is a member of the Southwestern Athletic Conference, which is part of the National Collegiate Athletic Association's Division I. The team plays its home games at Radiology Associates Field at Jackie Robinson Ballpark in Daytona Beach, Florida. Jonathan Hernandez is the team's head coach starting in the 2019 season.

== History ==
Mervyl Melendez was named the head coach at Bethune-Cookman, leading his alma mater to eleven Mid-Eastern Athletic Conference championships in his twelve seasons. As coach at Bethune-Cookman, Melendez led the team two back-to-back undefeated conference seasons in 2010 and 2011. His teams also won the Mid-Eastern Athletic Conference baseball tournament every year from 2000 through 2011, with the exception of 2005. He won 379 games as coach of the Wildcats, and in 2009 became the second-youngest coach in NCAA history to win 300 games. Prior to the start of the 2012 season, Jason Beverlin was named the head coach at Bethune-Cookman. On August 14, 2018, Jonathan Hernandez was named the head coach of the Bethune–Cookman Wildcats baseball program. Following a 17–38 season in 2019, Hernandez was able to land the 59th ranked recruiting class.

== Bethune-Cookman in the NCAA Tournament ==
Year	Record	Pct	Notes
1999	0–2	.000	Coral Gables Regional
2000	0–2	.000	Tallahassee Regional
2001	0–2	.000	Tallahassee Regional
2002	1–2	.333	Gainesville Regional
2003	0–2	.000	Coral Gables Regional
2004	0–2	.000	Tallahassee Regional
2006	0–2	.000	Oxford Regional
2007	0–2	.000	Tallahassee Regional
2008	0–2	.000	Coral Gables Regional
2009	0–2	.000	Gainesville Regional
2010	0–2	.000	Gainesville Regional
2011	0–2	.000	Tallahassee Regional
2017	0–2	.000	Gainesville Regional
2025	0–2	.000	Tallahassee Regional
TOTALS	1–28	.034	

== Head coaches ==
Season	Coach	Years	Record	Pct.
1969–1979	John Knight	11	126–119–3	.514
1980–1984	Don Dungee	5	102–128–1	.444
1985, 1987, 1989–1990	Johnny Randolph	4	31–93	.250
1986	Joe Golinski	1	8–31	.205
1988	Don Williams	1	7–24	.226
1991–1992	Gary France	2	14–73–1	.165
1993–1996	Brian Rhees	4	89–96–1	.481
1997–1999	Richard Skeel	3	75–93	.446
2000–2012	Mervyl Melendez	13	379–320	.542
2013–2017	Jason Beverlin	6	179–177	.503
2018	Barrett Shaft	1	24–34	.414
2019–present	Jonathan Hernandez	6	115–136	.458
Totals	12 coaches	57 seasons	1,149–1,324–6	.465

== See also ==
- List of NCAA Division I baseball programs
