= Delaware State Hornets baseball =

- 2026 Delaware State Hornets baseball team
- Founded: 1957
- Conference history: CIAA (1958–1970)
- University: Delaware State University
- Athletic director: Scott Gines
- Head coach: Pedro Swann (2nd season)
- Conference: Northeast Conference
- Location: Dover, Delaware
- Home stadium: Bob Reed Field (capacity: 400)
- Nickname: Hornets
- Colors: Columbia blue and red

Conference regular season champions
- 1989, 2022

The Delaware State Hornets baseball team is the varsity intercollegiate athletic team of the Delaware State University in Dover, Delaware, United States. The team competes in the National Collegiate Athletic Association's Division I and is a member of the Northeast Conference (NEC). Through the 2022 season, the Hornets had competed in the school's full-time home of the Mid-Eastern Athletic Conference (MEAC), but after that season, the MEAC merged its baseball league into that of the NEC. Delaware State and the three other MEAC members that sponsored baseball became NEC associate members in that sport.

== Head coaches ==
Year(s)	Coach	Seasons	W–L–T	Pct
1957–1959	Bennie J. George	3	23–15	.605
1969–1976, 1978–1984	James H. Williams	15	181–151–1	.545
1977	Jackie Robinson	1	10–26–1	.284
1985–1998	Harry Van Sant	14	223–283–5	.441
1999–2000	Tripp Keister	2	45–38	.542
2001–2024	J. P. Blandin	24	525–615–6	.461
Totals	6	59	1,007–1,128–6	.472
