= Coppin State Eagles baseball =

Coppin State Eagles
- 2026 Coppin State Eagles baseball team
- Founded: 1984; 42 years ago
- University: Coppin State University
- Athletic director: Derek Carter
- Head coach: Sherman Reed (16th season)
- Conference: Northeast Conference
- Location: Baltimore, Maryland
- Home stadium: Joe Cannon Stadium (Capacity: 1,500)
- Nickname: Eagles
- Colors: Blue and gold

NCAA tournament appearances
- 2022

Conference tournament champions
- 1995, 2022

The Coppin State Eagles baseball team is the varsity intercollegiate athletic team of the Coppin State University in Baltimore, Maryland, United States. The team competes in the National Collegiate Athletic Association's Division I and is a member of the Northeast Conference (NEC). Through the 2022 season, the Eagles had competed in the school's full-time home of the Mid-Eastern Athletic Conference (MEAC), but after that season, the MEAC merged its baseball league into that of the NEC. Coppin State and the three other MEAC members that sponsored baseball became NEC associate members in that sport.

== Coppin State in the NCAA Tournament ==
Year	Record	Pct	Notes
2022	0–2	.000	Greenville Regional
TOTALS	0–2	.000	

== Head coaches ==
Year(s)	Coach	Seasons	W–L–T	Pct
1984–1987	Reggie Smith	4	46–6–1	.304
1988	Marvin Dorsey	1	2–16	.111
1989–1997	Jason Booker	9	83–249–2	.251
1998–2002	Paul Blair	5	30–183	.143
2003–2006	Guy Robertson	4	69–139	.332
2007–2008	Harvey Lee	2	4–96	.040
2009–2010	Mike Scolinos	2	14–62	.184
2011–present	Sherman Reed	14	179–436–3	.292
Totals	8	40	427–1,187–6	.265
