= North Carolina A&T Aggies baseball =

North Carolina A&T Aggies
- 2026 North Carolina A&T Aggies baseball team
- Founded: 1902
- University: North Carolina Agricultural and Technical State University
- Head coach: Ben Hall (12th season)
- Conference: Coastal Athletic Association
- Location: Greensboro, North Carolina
- Home stadium: War Memorial Stadium (capacity: 7,500)
- Nickname: Aggies
- Colors: Blue and gold

NCAA tournament appearances
- 2005, 2018

Conference tournament champions
- 1974, 1993, 2005, 2018

Conference regular season champions
- MEAC: 1974, 1993, 2005, 2018; CIAA: 1950, 1951, 1952, 1953, 1954, 1955, 1957, 1958, 1959, 1960, 1961, 1968, 1969, 1970

The North Carolina A&T Aggies baseball team represents the North Carolina Agricultural and Technical State University in NCAA Division I college baseball. They compete in the Coastal Athletic Association. The Aggies play their home games at War Memorial Stadium, and are currently coached by Ben Hall.

== Venue ==
The Aggie baseball program plays all home contests in War Memorial Stadium. The stadium, which was built in 1926, has a capacity of 7,500. The stadium has served as the home of various local minor league baseball clubs from the 1930s to 2004.

== Team achievements ==
North Carolina A&T joined the Mid-Eastern Athletic Conference as a founding member in 1969. Before that, the Aggies were members of the Division II Central Intercollegiate Athletic Conference (CIAA), where they won 14 conference titles, including a six-season streak from 1950 to 1955. Since joining the MEAC, A&T has claimed 3 conference titles.

== North Carolina A&T in the NCAA Tournament ==
Year	Record	Pct	Notes
2005	0–2	.000	Clemson Regional
2018	0–2	.000	Chapel Hill Regional
TOTALS	0–4	.000	

Year	Coach	Conference	Record	Conference Tournament champion
1950	Joseph Echols	CIAA
1951	Leroy F. Harris	CIAA	18-0
1952	Leroy F. Harris	CIAA
1953	Leroy F. Harris	CIAA
1954	Leroy F. Harris	CIAA
1955	Melvin Gromes	CIAA
1957	Melvin Gromes	CIAA	6-7
1958	Melvin Gromes	CIAA	8-4
1959	Melvin Gromes	CIAA	10-1
1960	Melvin Gromes	CIAA	12-0-1
1961	Melvin Gromes	CIAA	15-5-1
1968	Melvin Gromes	CIAA	13-6
1969	Melvin Gromes	CIAA
1970	Melvin Gromes	CIAA
1974	Melvin Gromes	MEAC	16-8
1993	Keith Henry	MEAC	12-22	Yes
2005	Keith Shumate	MEAC	27-27	Yes
2018	Ben Hall	MEAC	32-23	Yes
Total conference championships			18

== Notable players ==
Aggies in MLB
MLB Draft selections
Total selected:	18
First picks in draft:	0
1st Round:	0
MLB achievements
Total Players:	2
All Stars:	1
In the World Series:	1
Hall of Famers:	0

Many North Carolina A&T Aggie players have gone on to play baseball in Major, Minor, and Negro leagues. Of the 18 Aggie baseball players that have been selected in the Major League Baseball draft, Lloyd Lightfoot holds the distinction of being the highest drafted at #214 to the Baltimore Orioles in 1968.

Aggie baseball players that have gone on to play professionally include: Negro league players Edward Martin, James Robinson & Hubert "Burt" Simmons and Major league players Tom Alston & Al Holland. Other notable former Aggie baseball players include: Hugh Evans who later transitioned into officiating for the NBA and Artis Stanfield, the first African-American to win the NCAA batting championship.

== Coaches ==
=== Head coaches ===
The current coach of the Aggies is Ben Hall. Prior to joining NC A&T, Hall held previous assistant coaching positions at Winthrop University and Wingate University.

== See also ==
- List of NCAA Division I baseball programs
