= Norfolk State Spartans baseball =

Norfolk State Spartans
- 2026 Norfolk State Spartans baseball team
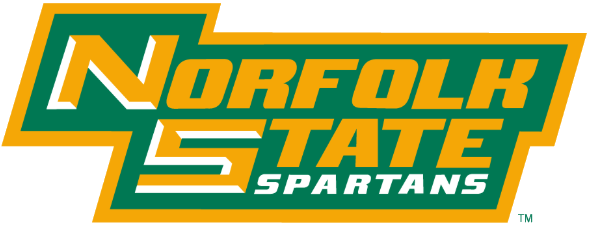
- Founded: 1964; 62 years ago
- University: Norfolk State University
- Head coach: Merrill Morgan (1st season)
- Conference: NEC
- Location: Norfolk, Virginia
- Home stadium: Marty L. Miller Field (Capacity: 1,500)
- Nickname: Spartans
- Colors: Green and gold

NCAA tournament appearances
- NCAA Division II; 1988, 1989, 1990 NCAA Division I 2021

Conference tournament champions
- 2021

The Norfolk State Spartans baseball team is the varsity intercollegiate athletic team of the Norfolk State University in Norfolk, Virginia, United States. The team competes in the National Collegiate Athletic Association's Division I and is a member of the Northeast Conference (NEC). Through the 2022 season, the Spartans had competed in the school's full-time home of the Mid-Eastern Athletic Conference (MEAC), but after that season, the MEAC merged its baseball league into that of the NEC. Norfolk State and the three other MEAC members that sponsored baseball became NEC associate members in that sport.

== Norfolk State in the NCAA Tournament ==
The Spartans have been to one NCAA tournament in 2021. In 2021, the Spartans won their first MEAC Baseball tournament championship, earning the league's automatic bid to the NCAA Tournament

| Year | Region | Opponent | Result |
|---|---|---|---|
| 2021 | Greenville Regional | East Carolina; Maryland | L 5–8; L 0–16 |

=== NCAA Division II ===
Norfolk State appeared in the NCAA Division II baseball tournament three times. The Spartans had a record of 1–6.

| Year | Opponent | Result |
|---|---|---|
| 1988 | Columbus State; Kentucky Wesleyan | L 4–6; L 6–12 |
| 1989 | Shippensburg; Slippery Rock | L 3–4 (11); L 4–16 |
| 1990 | Indiana (PA); Jefferson; Jefferson | W 16–15; L 1–7; L 7–8 |

== Stadiums ==
=== Marty L. Miller Field ===
Marty L. Miller Field is a baseball stadium in Norfolk, Virginia. The venue is named for former Norfolk State baseball coach Marty Miller. Built in 1997, it has a capacity of 1,500 spectators.

== Head coaches ==
| Year(s) | Coach | Seasons | W–L–T | Pct |
|---|---|---|---|---|
| 1973–2004 | Marty Miller | 32 | 718–543–3 | .569 |
| 2005–2017 | Claudell Clark | 13 | 287–332–1 | .464 |
| 2018–2025 | Keith Shumate | 8 | 111–250 | .307 |
| Totals | 3 | 53 | 1,116–1,125–4 | .498 |
