= 2013 Arizona Wildcats baseball team =

2013 Arizona Wildcats baseball
- Conference: Pac-12 Conference
- Record: 34–21 (15–15 Pac-12)
- Head coach: Andy Lopez (12th season)
- Assistant coaches: Shaun Cole (4th season); Matt Siegel (2nd season); Brett Scyphers (4th season)
- Home stadium: Hi Corbett Field

The 2013 Arizona Wildcats baseball team represented the University of Arizona in the 2013 NCAA Division I baseball season. The Wildcats played their home games for the 2nd season at Hi Corbett Field. The team was coached by Andy Lopez in his 12th season at Arizona. The program was coming off of a season that saw them win their first College World Series title since 1986.

== Personnel ==
=== Roster ===
2013 Pac-12 Conference baseball standings
	Conf.						Overall
Team	W		L		T	PCT	W		L		T	PCT
No. 4 Oregon State ‍†‍‍^{y}	24	–	6	–	0	.800	52	–	12	–	0	.813
No. 17 Oregon ‍‍‍^{y}	22	–	8	–	0	.733	48	–	16	–	0	.750
No. 1 UCLA ‍‍‍^{y}	21	–	9	–	0	.700	46	–	17	–	0	.730
No. 19 Arizona State ‍‍‍^{y}	16	–	14	–	0	.533	37	–	22	–	1	.625
Stanford ‍‍‍	16	–	14	–	0	.533	32	–	22	–	0	.593
Arizona ‍‍‍	15	–	15	–	0	.500	34	–	21	–	0	.618
Washington ‍‍‍	15	–	15	–	0	.500	24	–	32	–	0	.429
California ‍‍‍	10	–	20	–	0	.333	23	–	31	–	0	.426
Southern California ‍‍‍	10	–	20	–	0	.333	20	–	36	–	0	.357
Washington State ‍‍‍	9	–	21	–	0	.300	23	–	32	–	0	.418
Utah ‍‍‍	7	–	23	–	0	.233	21	–	31	–	0	.404
† – Conference champion y – Invited to the NCAA tournament As of June 22, 2013; Rankings from Collegiate Baseball

2013 Arizona Wildcats roster
Pitchers • 10 – Tyler Hale – Senior • 12 – Kevin Elder – Freshman • 14 – Vincent Littleman – Senior • 19 – Tyger Talley – Freshman • 27 – Jesse Scholtens – Freshman • 30 – Tyler Crawford – Sophomore • 31 – Stephen Manthei – RS Junior • 33 – Augie Bill – RS Junior • 34 – Nick Hynes – Freshman • 35 – Nathan Bannister – Freshman • 36 – James Farris – Junior • 37 – Cody Moffett – Freshman • 42 – Nick Cunningham – Senior • 44 – Mathew Troupe – Sophomore • 48 – Konner Wade – Junior • 49 – Xavier Borde – RS Freshman	Catchers • 6 – Riley Moore – Sophomore • 21 – David Real – Freshman • 29 – Jordan Berger – Sophomore Infielders • 2 – Kevin Newman – Freshman • 3 – Ryan Koziol – Freshman • 4 – Trent Gilbert – Sophomore • 5 – Sam Eco-Perris – Junior • 13 – Cody Ramer – Freshman • 17 – Jackson Willeford – Freshman • 22 – Brandon Dixon – Junior • 25 – Scott Kingery – Freshman • 28 – David Lopez – RS Junior	Outfielders • 1 – Johnny Field – Junior • 11 – Sam Brown – Freshman • 15 – Joseph Maggi – Sophomore • 23 – Zach Gibbons – Freshman • 24 – Tyler Parmenter – Sophomore

=== Coaches ===
2013 Arizona Wildcats baseball coaching staff
- Andy Lopez – Head coach
- Shaun Cole – Assistant coach
- Matt Siegel – Assistant coach
- Brett Scyphers – Volunteer assistant coach

=== Opening day ===
Opening Day Starters
Name	Position
Scott Kingery	Left fielder
Joseph Maggi	Right fielder
Johnny Field	Center fielder
Riley Moore	Catcher
Brandon Dixon	Third baseman
Trent Gilbert	Second baseman
Tyler Parmenter	Designated hitter
Ryan Koziol	First baseman
Kevin Newman	Shortstop
Konner Wade	Starting pitcher

== Schedule and results ==
2013 Arizona Wildcats baseball game log
Regular season
Date	Opponent	Rank	Site/stadium	Score	Win	Loss	Save	Overall Record	Pac-12 Record
Feb 15	vs Coppin State	#10	Hi Corbett Field • Tucson, AZ	W 16–0	Wade (1–0)	Martinez (0–1)	None	1–0	
Feb 16	vs Coppin State	#10	Hi Corbett Field • Tucson, AZ	W 14–1	Farris (1–0)	Muhammad (0–1)	None	2–0	
Feb 17	vs Coppin State	#10	Hi Corbett Field • Tucson, AZ	W 13–9	Bill (1–0)	Taylor (0–1)	Troupe (1)	3–0	
Feb 19	at Long Beach State	#10	Blair Field • Long Beach, CA	L 4–5	Sabo (1–0)	Cunningham (0–1)	Maciel (1)	3–1	
Feb 20	at Long Beach State	#10	Blair Field • Long Beach, CA	W 3–1	Crawford (1–0)	Millison (0–1)	Troupe (2)	4–1	
Feb 22	vs San Jose State	#10	Hi Corbett Field • Tucson, AZ	W 8–7	Bill (2–0)	Hassna (1–1)	None	5–1	
Feb 23	vs San Jose State	#10	Hi Corbett Field • Tucson, AZ	W 15–4	Farris (2–0)	Russo (1–1)	None	6–1	
Feb 24	vs San Jose State	#10	Hi Corbett Field • Tucson, AZ	W 9–4	Manthei (1–0)	Slaton (0–2)	Troupe (3)	7–1	
Feb 26	vs Utah Valley	#10	Hi Corbett Field • Tucson, AZ	L 1–3	Freter (1–0)	Crawford (1–1)	Whatcott (2)	7–2	
Feb 27	vs Utah Valley	#10	Hi Corbett Field • Tucson, AZ	W 14–5	Moffett (1–0)	Hansen (0–1)	None	8–2	
Mar 1	vs San Francisco	#10	Hi Corbett Field • Tucson, AZ	W 6–4	Wade (2–0)	Bobb (0–3)	Troupe (4)	9–2	
Mar 2	vs San Francisco	#10	Hi Corbett Field • Tucson, AZ	W 5–2	Farris (3–0)	Balog (1–1)	Cunnigham (1)	10–2	
Mar 3	vs San Francisco	#10	Hi Corbett Field • Tucson, AZ	L 2–9	Cecilio (1–0)	Manthei (1–1)	Hinkle (1)	10–3	
Mar 5	vs Texas Tech	#16	Hi Corbett Field • Tucson, AZ	W 6–2	Crawford (2–1)	Drozd (1–1)	None	11–3	
Mar 6	vs Texas Tech	#16	Hi Corbett Field • Tucson, AZ	L 2–5	Wheeler (1–0)	Cunningham (0–2)	McCrummen (1)	11–4	
Mar 8	vs Columbia	#16	Hi Corbett Field • Tucson, AZ	W 4–3	Troupe (1–0)	Crispi (0–1)	None	12–4	
Mar 9	vs Columbia	#16	Hi Corbett Field • Tucson, AZ	L 4–8	Donino (1–0)	Farris (3–1)	None	12–5	
Mar 10	vs Columbia	#16	Hi Corbett Field • Tucson, AZ	W 7–5	Troupe (1–0)	Crispi (0–2)	None	13–5	
Mar 12	vs Butler	#20	Hi Corbett Field • Tucson, AZ	W 14–2	Crawford (3–1)	Lenkman (0–2)	None	14–5	
Mar 13	vs Butler	#20	Hi Corbett Field • Tucson, AZ	W 14–2	Moffett (2–0)	Johnson (0–2)	None	15–5	
Mar 15	vs #4 Oregon State	#20	Hi Corbett Field • Tucson, AZ	L 2–6	Boyd (4–0)	Wade (2–1)	None	15–6	0–1
Mar 16	vs #4 Oregon State	#20	Hi Corbett Field • Tucson, AZ	L 3–4	Moore (5–0)	Farris (3–2)	Schultz (3)	15–7	0–2
Mar 17	vs #4 Oregon State	#20	Hi Corbett Field • Tucson, AZ	L 4–8	Jackson (4–0)	Moffett (2–1)	Schultz (4)	15–8	0–3
Mar 22	at #12 Oregon		PK Park • Eugene, OR	L 1–2	Reed (3–3)	Wade (2–2)	Sherfy (7)	15–9	0–4
Mar 23	at #12 Oregon		PK Park • Eugene, OR	L 1–5	Thorpe (3–2)	Farris (3–3)	None	15–10	0–5
Mar 24	at #12 Oregon		PK Park • Eugene, OR	L 6–7	Irvin (4–1)	Moffett (2–2)	None	15–11	0–6
Mar 28	vs Utah		Hi Corbett Field • Tucson, AZ	W 4–3	Talley (1–0)	West (1–1)	Troupe (5)	16–11	1–6
Mar 29	vs Utah		Hi Corbett Field • Tucson, AZ	W 15–4	Talley (2–0)	Pond (2–3)	Cunningham (2)	17–11	2–6
Mar 30	vs Utah		Hi Corbett Field • Tucson, AZ	W 2–1	Bill (3–0)	Carroll (2–2)	Troupe (6)	18–11	3–6
Apr 5	vs California		Hi Corbett Field • Tucson, AZ	W 10–1	Wade (3–2)	Mason (4–1)	None	19–11	4–6
Apr 6	vs California		Hi Corbett Field • Tucson, AZ	W 6–4	Talley (3–0)	Jones (1–4)	Troupe (7)	20–11	5–6
Apr 7	vs California		Hi Corbett Field • Tucson, AZ	W 5–4	Talley (4–0)	Nelson (1–2)	Troupe (8)	21–11	6–6
Apr 12	at Washington State		Bailey-Brayton Field • Pullman, WA	L 5–9	Pistorese (4–2)	Wade (3–3)	Camus (3)	21–12	6–7
Apr 13	at Washington State		Bailey-Brayton Field • Pullman, WA	W 6–5	Farris (4–3)	Chleborad (3–6)	Talley (1)	22–12	7–7
Apr 14	at Washington State		Bailey-Brayton Field • Pullman, WA	W 7–3	Crawford (4–1)	Simon (3–1)	None	23–12	8–7
Apr 16	vs #18 Arizona State	#25	Hi Corbett Field • Tucson, AZ	W 10–9	Bill (4–0)	Gillies (0–2)	Troupe (9)	24–12	
Apr 19	at Stanford	#25	Sunken Diamond • Palo Alto, CA	L 3–4	Appel (7–2)	Wade (3–4)	Lindquist (4)	24–13	8–8
Apr 20	at Stanford	#25	Sunken Diamond • Palo Alto, CA	W 10–9	Troupe (3–0)	Starwalt (2–1)	None	25–13	9–8
Apr 21	at Stanford	#25	Sunken Diamond • Palo Alto, CA	L 8–12	Lindquist (1–0)	Manthei (1–2)	None	25–14	9–9
Apr 26	vs Alabama State		Hi Corbett Field • Tucson, AZ	W 8–2	Wade (4–4)	Renda (8–1)	None	26–14	
Apr 27	vs Alabama State		Hi Corbett Field • Tucson, AZ	W 4–3	Troupe (4–0)	Pantoja (2–2)	None	27–14	
Apr 28	vs Alabama State		Hi Corbett Field • Tucson, AZ	W 18–3	Crawford (5–1)	Burnside (1–3)	Moffett (1)	28–14	
Apr 30	vs #16 Arizona State		Hi Corbett Field • Tucson, AZ	L 5–7	Gillies (2–2)	Hale (0–1)	Burr (10)	28–15	
May 3	vs Washington		Hi Corbett Field • Tucson, AZ	L 1–23	Fisher (2–2)	Wade (4–5)	None	28–16	9–10
May 4	vs Washington		Hi Corbett Field • Tucson, AZ	L 1–2	Voth (5–5)	Farris (4–4)	Dunlap (1)	28–17	9–11
May 5	vs Washington		Hi Corbett Field • Tucson, AZ	W 5–3	Troupe (5–0)	Davis (1–7)	Bill (1)	29–17	10–11
May 10	at #10 UCLA		Jackie Robinson Stadium • Los Angeles, CA	L 2–10	Plutko (7–2)	Farris (4–5)	None	29–18	10–12
May 11	at #10 UCLA		Jackie Robinson Stadium • Los Angeles, CA	L 1–7	Vander Tuig (9–3)	Wade (4–6)	Berg (13)	29–19	10–13
May 12	at #10 UCLA		Jackie Robinson Stadium • Los Angeles, CA	L 5–12	Deeter (2–0)	Crawford (5–2)	None	29–20	10–14
May 17	at #15 Arizona State		Packard Stadium • Tempe, AZ	W 10–7	Wade (5–6)	Williams (5–6)	Crawford (1)	30–20	11–14
May 18	at #15 Arizona State		Packard Stadium • Tempe, AZ	L 3–6	Burr (4–2)	Bill (4–1)	None	30–21	11–15
May 19	at #15 Arizona State		Packard Stadium • Tempe, AZ	W 7–6	Crawford (6–2)	Dunbar (1–1)	Bill (2)	31–21	12–15
May 24	vs USC		Hi Corbett Field • Tucson, AZ	W 4–3	Troupe (6–0)	Davis (4–4)	None	32–21	13–15
May 25	vs USC		Hi Corbett Field • Tucson, AZ	W 18–4	Farris (5–5)	Nootbaar (2–6)	None	33–21	14–15
May 26	vs USC		Hi Corbett Field • Tucson, AZ	W 7–1	Crawford (7–2)	Twomey (2–8)	None	34–21	15–15

== 2013 MLB draft ==
Player	Position	Round	Overall	MLB team
Brandon Dixon	3B	3	92	Los Angeles Dodgers
Johnny Field	2B	5	158	Tampa Bay Rays
Konner Wade	RHP	7	199	Colorado Rockies
James Farris	RHP	15	437	Houston Astros
Nick Cunningham	RHP	20	609	Baltimore Orioles
Augey Bill	LHP	39	1179	Baltimore Orioles
