= Shaun Cole (baseball) =

American baseball player and coach (born 1979)

Biographical details
- Born: February 4, 1979 (age 47)
- Education: William Penn University; University of Washington

Playing career
- 2002–2004: Pierce
- 2004–2006: William Penn
- Position: Pitcher

Coaching career (HC unless noted)
- 2008: Edmonds Community College (asst.)
- 2009: Arizona (volunteer asst.)
- 2010–2014: Arizona (assistant)
- 2014–2015: United States U18 (director)
- 2016–2018: San Diego Padres (coord. of player development)
- 2016: Tri-City Dust Devils (asst.)
- 2017: AZL Padres 1
- 2019–2020: Eastern Kentucky (asst.)
- 2022–2023: San Diego State (asst.)
- 2024–2025: San Diego State

Head coaching record
- Overall: 37–76 (.327)

Accomplishments and honors

Championships
- As an assistant coach: College World Series (2012); Pac-12 regular season (2012); Mountain West regular season (2023); NWAACC tournament (2008)

Awards
- Collegiate Baseball Pitching Coach of the Year (2012)

Shaun Cole (born February 4, 1979) is an American college baseball coach and former pitcher who was the head coach of the San Diego State Aztecs baseball team at San Diego State University (SDSU). He played college baseball at Pierce College and William Penn before beginning his coaching career as an assistant at Edmonds Community College.

== Early life and education ==
Cole was born on February 4, 1979. A native of Olympia, Washington, he excelled as a left-handed pitcher at Pierce College before earning a scholarship to attend William Penn University in Oskaloosa, Iowa, where he played for the nationally ranked Statesmen from 2004 to 2006. Cole earned a bachelor's degree in education with a concentration in kinesiology from William Penn in 2004, followed by a Master of Education in intercollegiate athletic leadership from the University of Washington in 2009.

== Coaching career ==
After finishing his playing career, Cole returned to his home state of Washington. In 2006, he spent six months with the Tacoma Rainiers, the Seattle Mariners Triple-A affiliate, assisting the general manager for baseball operations while learning under pitching coach Dwight Bernard.

Cole began his coaching career at Edmonds Community College in Lynnwood, Washington, where he joined the staff as a pitching coach and recruiting coordinator in mid-2007. In his one season with the team in 2008, he helped the Tritons achieve a 38–9 record and win the Northwest Athletic Association of Community Colleges (NWAACC) title under the NWAACC Coach of the Year, Brad Ditter.

=== Arizona (2010–2014) ===
While he completed his master's degree, Cole sent out letters to both college and professional teams in search of an internship opportunity; he heard back from the University of Arizona and the Los Angeles Angels. He "decided to make a run at college ball", joining the Wildcats staff in January 2009 as an unpaid assistant under head coach Andy Lopez. In his first year with the team, Cole shadowed Lopez in the development of the pitching staff and assisted the director of baseball operations. He was then promoted to the full-time role of pitching coach ahead of the 2010 season, following the departure of assistant coach Jeff Pickler, though he continued assisting in various departments from recruiting to scheduling and travel coordination.

When people ask me how I got into Division I coaching I say 'I was willing to work for nothing.' It was a roll of the dice, but strategically it was the right decision for me. I'm forever indebted to Andy Lopez.

— Cole on obtaining his first NCAA Division I coaching job.

In his first season as pitching coach, Cole developed a young pitching staff which featured five freshmen in the top eight of the rotation and 13 underclassmen overall. One of his starters, Kurt Heyer, earned first-team all-Pac-12 Conference honors and was named a Freshman All-American by several publications. In 2011, Cole guided the pitching staff to a 3.57 earned run average (ERA) — the lowest for an Arizona team since 1976. Heyer earned third-team All-American honors while three more pitchers were selected in the 2011 MLB draft. In 2012, Cole was unanimously named Pitching Coach of the Year by Collegiate Baseball after helping the Wildcats win the College World Series and a share of the Pac-12 title. Under his tutelage, Heyer was named a second-team All-American after leading the nation with 13 wins, and combined with Konner Wade and James Farris for a 31—8 win–loss record, a 3.30 ERA and 16 complete games.

In late 2013, while Lopez recovered from a surgery, Cole was put in charge of fall practices and recruiting – along with fellow assistant Matt Siegel – in lieu of an interim coach. Overall, he mentored nine pitchers who were selected in the MLB draft, including four in 2013 alone. On the recruiting trail, Cole contributed to four consecutive nationally ranked signing classes from 2012 to 2015.

=== USA Baseball (2014–2015) ===
On June 13, 2014, Cole was named the director of the U.S. national under-18 baseball team by USA Baseball. He also managed the Tournament of Stars and the 17U National Team Identification Series, both of which served to select talent for the 18U squad. During his tenure, Cole guided the U.S. to gold-medal finishes at the 2014 U18 COPABE Pan American Championships held in Mexico and the 2015 U-18 Baseball World Cup held in Japan.

=== San Diego Padres (2016–2018) ===
On September 23, 2015, Cole was hired by the San Diego Padres organization as coordinator of player development. In this role, he was involved with "all aspects of baseball operations, scouting and player development". In 2016, Cole joined the team's short season A affiliate, the Tri-City Dust Devils, as a pitching coach under manager Ben Fritz. That season, the Dust Devils pitching staff ranked top two in every major pitching category in the Northwest League. The following year, Cole served as manager of the AZL Padres 1, one of two similarly named Padres rookie-level affiliates, and led the squad to a 25–31 record, in addition to serving as coordinator for San Diego's spring training facility in Arizona. In 2018, the Padres' minor league system was ranked No. 1 in the MLB.

=== Eastern Kentucky (2019–2020) ===
On September 10, 2018, Cole was hired at Eastern Kentucky University, returning to the collegiate ranks as a pitching coach for the Colonels under head coach Edwin Thompson. He had previously hired Thompson to coach in the Tournament of Stars during his time with USA Baseball.

In his first season with the team in 2019, Cole helped the pitching staff set team records in strikeouts (510) and lowest opposing batting average (.258) while recording the most wins (32) since 2004 and the lowest team ERA (4.79) since 2008. Three of his pitchers earned all-Ohio Valley Conference accolades, including Aaron Ochsenbein, who also earned second-team All-American honors and was selected in the 2019 MLB draft after setting the school record for lowest single-season ERA (0.83). In 2020, Cole helped the Colonels to a 12–2 record – one of the best starts in program history, highlighted by an upset at No. 11 LSU – before the season was cancelled due to the COVID-19 pandemic.

Cole contributed to three of the highest-ranked recruiting classes in Colonels history.

=== San Diego State (2022–2025) ===
On August 3, 2021, following two seasons at Eastern Kentucky, Cole was hired as a pitching coach at San Diego State (SDSU) under head coach Mark Martinez. In his first season with the Aztecs in 2022, he mentored Troy Melton, who was named the Mountain West Conference (MWC) Co-Pitcher of the Year and was selected in that year's MLB draft. In 2023, Cole helped T.J. Fondtain win the MWC Pitcher of the Year award as well as second-team All-American honors from multiple outlets, notably recording the eighth no-hitter in school history against Nevada. Meanwhile, Aztecs relief pitcher Kelena Sauer earned first-team all-MWC honors after leading the conference with 12 saves; both players were selected in that year's MLB draft. Additionally, the Aztecs claimed a share of the MWC regular season title, their first since 2004, with an 18–11 conference record.

On July 13, 2023, Cole was named the Aztecs' acting head coach following Martinez's abrupt retirement. He was officially elevated to head coach on July 25, becoming just the sixth head coach in the program's 88-year history. Cole hired Julius McDougal and Tony Tarasco as assistants soon afterwards.

Cole took charge of a 2024 Aztecs team that returned only three members of the starting lineup and two starting pitchers, adding 19 freshman to the roster. Over the next two seasons, the Aztecs posted records of 17–37 and 20–39, respectively, which were two of the three worst records in program history. On May 29, 2025, San Diego State announced that Cole would not be returning to the program after two seasons in charge.

== Head coaching record ==
Record table
Season	Team	Overall	Conference	Standing	Postseason
San Diego State Aztecs (Mountain West Conference) (2024–2025)
2024	San Diego State	17–37	10–20	7th	
2025	San Diego State	20–39	14–16	5th	
San Diego State:		37–76 (.327)	24–36 (.400)		
Total:		37–76 (.327)			
National champion Postseason invitational champion Conference regular season champion Conference regular season and conference tournament champion Division regular season champion Division regular season and conference tournament champion Conference tournament champion
