= 2012 Arizona Wildcats baseball team =

2012 Arizona Wildcats baseball

College World Series Champions vs. South Carolina

Tucson Super Regional Champions Tucson Regional Champions Pac-12 Regular Season Co-Champions
- Conference: Pac-12 Conference

Ranking
- Coaches: No. 1
- CB: No. 1
- Record: 48–17 (20–10 Pac-12)
- Head coach: Andy Lopez (11th season)
- Assistant coaches: Shaun Cole (3rd season); Matt Siegel (1st season); Brett Scyphers (3rd season)
- Home stadium: Hi Corbett Field

2012 Pac-12 Conference baseball standings
| | Conf. | | | | Overall |
| Team | W | | L | PCT | W | | L | PCT |
|---|---|---|---|---|---|---|---|---|
| No. 4 UCLA ‍†‍‍^{y} | 20 | – | 10 | .667 | 48 | – | 16 | .750 |
| No. 11 Arizona ‍‍‍^{y} | 20 | – | 10 | .667 | 48 | – | 17 | .738 |
| No. 10 Oregon ‍‍‍^{y} | 19 | – | 11 | .633 | 46 | – | 19 | .708 |
| No. 13 Stanford ‍‍‍^{y} | 18 | – | 12 | .600 | 41 | – | 18 | .695 |
| No. 17 Oregon State ‍‍‍^{y} | 18 | – | 12 | .600 | 40 | – | 20 | .667 |
| Arizona State ‍‍‍ | 18 | – | 12 | .600 | 36 | – | 20 | .643 |
| Washington ‍‍‍ | 13 | – | 17 | .433 | 30 | – | 25 | .545 |
| California ‍‍‍ | 12 | – | 18 | .400 | 29 | – | 25 | .537 |
| Washington State ‍‍‍ | 12 | – | 18 | .400 | 28 | – | 28 | .500 |
| USC ‍‍‍ | 8 | – | 22 | .267 | 23 | – | 32 | .418 |
| Utah ‍‍‍ | 7 | – | 23 | .233 | 14 | – | 42 | .250 |
† – Conference champion y – Invited to the 2012 NCAA Division I baseball tournament As of May 28, 2012; Rankings from Coaches' Poll

The 2012 Arizona Wildcats baseball team represented the University of Arizona in the 2012 NCAA Division I baseball season. The Wildcats played their home games at Hi Corbett Field, off campus in Tucson, AZ. This was the first full season for the Wildcats at Hi Corbett Field, which is the former spring training home of the Cleveland Indians and Colorado Rockies. Andy Lopez was in his eleventh season as Arizona Wildcats baseball head coach. Lopez was in his twenty-fourth year as head coach. The Wildcats tied for first in the Pac-12 Conference with UCLA, finishing with a 20–10 conference record. The Wildcats finished the season with a 48–17 record. Six players were picked in the 2012 Major League Baseball draft.

In the 2012 NCAA Division I baseball tournament, the Wildcats performed well in the NCAA Regional and Super Regional rounds, hosting in Tucson for first time since 1992 and winning 5 straight games. The Wildcats defeated Missouri once and Louisville twice to win the Tucson Regional. They then won the Tucson Super Regional by defeating St. John's in two consecutive games. The team reached the 2012 College World Series for the sixteenth time in program history, beating Florida State twice in the first and third game and UCLA in game two. The Wildcats faced two-time defending champion South Carolina in the championship series, sweeping both games to win the 2012 College World Series. This was Arizona's first College World Series championship since 1986, and fourth overall. They finished the post-season with a 10–0 record and were only the second team after South Carolina the previous year to do so.

== Roster ==
2012 Arizona Wildcats baseball team
Players
Coaches

| # | Pos. | Name | B/T | Height | Weight | Year | Home town |
|---|---|---|---|---|---|---|---|
| 29 | C | Jordan Berger | L/R | 5 ft 10 in (1.78 m) | 190 lb (86 kg) | Fr | Tarzana, CA |
| 33 | LHP | Augey Bill | L/L | 6 ft 9 in (2.06 m) | 222 lb (101 kg) | Jr | Danville, CA |
| 49 | LHP | Xavier Borde | L/L | 6 ft 2 in (1.88 m) | 210 lb (95 kg) | Fr | Playa del Rey, CA |
| 37 | OF | Bobby Brown | L/R | 6 ft 3 in (1.91 m) | 200 lb (91 kg) | RS Sr | San Diego, CA |
| 46 | RHP | Ismael Castro | R/R | 6 ft 0 in (1.83 m) | 180 lb (82 kg) | Jr | Phoenix, AZ |
| 30 | LHP | Tyler Crawford | R/L | 6 ft 1 in (1.85 m) | 180 lb (82 kg) | Fr | DeLand, FL |
| 42 | RHP | Nick Cunningham | R/R | 6 ft 2 in (1.88 m) | 204 lb (93 kg) | Jr | Indianapolis, IN |
| 47 | C | Anthony de Jesus | R/R | 5 ft 9 in (1.75 m) | 177 lb (80 kg) | Fr | Houston, TX |
| 21 | OF | Collin Dewell | L/L | 6 ft 0 in (1.83 m) | 185 lb (84 kg) | Fr | Santa Barbara, CA |
| 22 | INF | Brandon Dixon | R/R | 6 ft 1 in (1.85 m) | 211 lb (96 kg) | So | Murrieta, CA |
| 11 | RHP | Jacob Doyle | R/R | 6 ft 1 in (1.85 m) | 178 lb (81 kg) | So | Glendale, AZ |
| 36 | RHP | James Farris | R/R | 6 ft 2 in (1.88 m) | 213 lb (97 kg) | So | Gilbert, AZ |
| 1 | INF | Johnny Field | R/R | 5 ft 10 in (1.78 m) | 194 lb (88 kg) | So | Las Vegas, NV |
| 4 | INF | Trent Gilbert | L/R | 6 ft 1 in (1.85 m) | 175 lb (79 kg) | Fr | Torrance, CA |
| 10 | RHP | Tyler Hale | R/R | 5 ft 10 in (1.78 m) | 170 lb (77 kg) | Jr | Abilene, TX |
| 26 | RHP | Kurt Heyer | R/R | 6 ft 2 in (1.88 m) | 211 lb (96 kg) | Jr | Huntington Beach, CA |
| 14 | LHP | Vincent Littleman | L/L | 5 ft 11 in (1.8 m) | 180 lb (82 kg) | Jr | Lechee, AZ |
| 23 | RHP | Lucas Long | R/R | 6 ft 1 in (1.85 m) | 185 lb (84 kg) | Fr | Minneapolis, MN |
| 28 | INF | David Lopez | L/R | 5 ft 7 in (1.7 m) | 171 lb (78 kg) | RS So | Tucson, AZ |
| 45 | RHP | Michael Lopez | R/R | 6 ft 3 in (1.91 m) | 205 lb (93 kg) | RS Jr | Tucson, AZ |
| 15 | OF | Joseph Maggi | L/L | 5 ft 10 in (1.78 m) | 175 lb (79 kg) | Fr | Phoenix, AZ |
| 31 | RHP | Stephen Manthei | R/R | 6 ft 1 in (1.85 m) | 210 lb (95 kg) | Jr | Las Vegas, NV |
| 13 | INF | Alex Mejia | R/R | 6 ft 1 in (1.85 m) | 200 lb (91 kg) | Jr | Sylmar, CA |
| 5 | INF | Seth Mejias-Brean | R/R | 6 ft 2 in (1.88 m) | 210 lb (95 kg) | Jr | Tucson, AZ |
| 6 | C | Riley Moore | S/R | 6 ft 3 in (1.91 m) | 190 lb (86 kg) | Fr | Santa Barbara, CA |
| 24 | INF | Tyler Parmenter | R/R | 6 ft 2 in (1.88 m) | 188 lb (85 kg) | Fr | Yuma, AZ |
| 2 | OF | Rob Refsnyder | R/R | 6 ft 0 in (1.83 m) | 199 lb (90 kg) | Jr | Laguna Hills, CA |
| 35 | OF | Joey Rickard | R/L | 6 ft 1 in (1.85 m) | 185 lb (84 kg) | Jr | Las Vegas, NV |
| 27 | C | David Schuknecht | L/R | 6 ft 1 in (1.85 m) | 195 lb (88 kg) | Fr | Palm Desert, CA |
| 43 | OF | Ethan Springston | L/R | 6 ft 1 in (1.85 m) | 175 lb (79 kg) | Fr | Chandler, AZ |
| 34 | OF | Luke Sutton | L/L | 6 ft 1 in (1.85 m) | 190 lb (86 kg) | Fr | Vista, CA |
| 44 | RHP | Matthew Troupe | R/R | 6 ft 2 in (1.88 m) | 180 lb (82 kg) | Fr | Northridge, CA |
| 48 | RHP | Konner Wade | L/R | 6 ft 3 in (1.91 m) | 182 lb (83 kg) | So | Scottsdale, AZ |
| 38 | C | Sean Yanuss | R/R | 5 ft 10 in (1.78 m) | 175 lb (79 kg) | Fr | Brier, WA |

Head coach

Andy Lopez

Assistant coach(es)

- Shaun Cole
- Matt Siegel
- Brett Scyphers
- Josh Garcia

Legend

- (C) Team captain
- (S) Suspended
- (I) Ineligible
- Injured
- Current redshirt

Roster
Last update: 2012-06-09

=== Opening day ===
Opening Day Starters
| Name | Position |
|---|---|
| Joey Rickard | Center fielder |
| Trent Gilbert | Second baseman |
| Robert Refsnyder | Right fielder |
| Johnny Field | Left fielder |
| Seth Mejias-Brean | Third baseman |
| Bobby Brown | Designated hitter |
| Brandon Dixon | First baseman |
| Riley Moore | Catcher |
| Alex Mejia | Shortstop |
| Kurt Heyer | Starting pitcher |

== Schedule ==
2012 Arizona Wildcats baseball game log
Regular season
February: 5–2 (Conference: 0–0; Home: 5–2; Road: 0–0)

| # | Date | Opponent | Site/stadium | Score | Win | Loss | Save | Attendance | Overall record | Pac-12 Record |
|---|---|---|---|---|---|---|---|---|---|---|
| 1 | February 17 | North Dakota State | Hi Corbett Field | 3–1 | K. Heyer (1–0) | J.Straka (0–1) | S. Manthei (1) | 3997 | 1–0 | – |
| 2 | February 18 | North Dakota State | Hi Corbett Field | 2–8 | L. Anderson (1–0) | V. Littleman (0–1) | | 2920 | 1–1 | – |
| 3 | February 19 | North Dakota State | Hi Corbett Field | 8–0 | J. Farris (1–0) | Z. Wentz (0–1) | | 1953 | 2–1 | – |
| 4 | February 21 | Utah Valley | Hi Corbett Field | 12–6 | L. Long (1–0) | J. Campbell (0–1) | | 1694 | 3–1 | – |
| 5 | February 24 | Auburn | Hi Corbett Field | 8–1 | K. Heyer (2–0) | D. Varnadore (1–1) | | 2470 | 4–1 | – |
| 6 | February 25 | Auburn | Hi Corbett Field | 15–4 | K. Wade (1–0) | S. Smith (0–2) | | | 5–1 | – |
| 7 | February 25 | Auburn | Hi Corbett Field | 3–8 | D. Koger (1–0) | J. Farris (1–1) | | 1362 | 5–2 | – |

March: 15–5 (Conference: 6–2; Home: 12–3; Road: 3–2)

| # | Date | Opponent | Site/stadium | Score | Win | Loss | Save | Attendance | Overall record | Pac-12 Record |
|---|---|---|---|---|---|---|---|---|---|---|
| 9 | March 2 | Harvard | Hi Corbett Field | 7–1 | K. Heyer (3–0) | B. Suter (0–1) | | 1611 | 6–2 | – |
| 10 | March 3 | Harvard | Hi Corbett Field | 3–1 | K. Wade (2–0) | J. Novak (0–1) | M. Troupe (1) | 2187 | 7–2 | – |
| 11 | March 4 | Harvard | Hi Corbett Field | 13–2 | J. Farris (2–1) | J. Kremers (0–1) | | 1745 | 8–2 | – |
| 12 | March 6 | UC Davis | Hi Corbett Field | 6–0 | L. Long (3–0) | E. Wolf (0–1) | | 1248 | 9–2 | – |
| 13 | March 7 | UC Davis | Hi Corbett Field | 6–4 | M. Troupe (1–0) | C. Levy (3–1) | | 1305 | 10–2 | – |
| 14 | March 9 | Eastern Michigan | Hi Corbett Field | 9–2 | K. Heyer (4–0) | J. Battistelli (1–2) | | 1310 | 11–2 | – |
| 15 | March 10 | Eastern Michigan | Hi Corbett Field | 16–7 | K. Wade (3–0) | S. Weber (1–2) | | 1623 | 12–2 | – |
| 16 | March 11 | Eastern Michigan | Hi Corbett Field | 9–8 | M. Troupe (2–0) | N. Butara (0–1) | | 1801 | 13–2 | – |
| 17 | March 13 | Rice | Reckling Park | 1–5 | A. Benak (3–0) | L. Long (2–1) | | 3599 | 13–3 | – |
| 18 | March 14 | Rice | Reckling Park | 8–5 | S. Manthei (1–0) | T. Wall (3–2) | M. Troupe (2) | 3640 | 14–3 | 0–0 |
| 19 | March 16 | Washington State | Hi Corbett Field | 0–6 | JD. Leckenby (3–2) | K. Heyer (4–1) | | 2306 | 14–4 | 0–1 |
| 20 | March 17 | Washington State | Hi Corbett Field | 8–7 | S. Manthei (2–0) | J. Pistorese (2–1) | M. Troupe (3) | 1496 | 15–4 | 1–1 |
| 21 | March 17 | Washington State | Hi Corbett Field | 12–9 | S. Manthei (3–0) | K. Swannack (1–2) | | 2025 | 16–4 | 2–1 |
| 22 | March 20 | New Mexico State | Hi Corbett Field | 4–7 | E. Mott (1–2) | S. Manthei (3–1) | | 1286 | 15–5 | 2–1 |
| 23 | March 21 | New Mexico State | Hi Corbett Field | 8–13 | R. Montoya (1–0) | L. Long (2–2) | | 1520 | 16–6 | 2–1 |
| 24 | March 23 | Oregon State | Goss Stadium | 5–6 | T. Bryant (3–0) | S. Manthei (3–2) | | 1623 | 16–7 | 2–2 |
| 25 | March 24 | Oregon State | Goss Stadium | 5–4 | S. Manthei (4–2) | C. Brocker (0–3) | M. Troupe (4) | 1873 | 17–7 | 3–2 |
| 26 | March 25 | Oregon State | Goss Stadium | 7–5 | J. Farris (3–1) | J. Fry (1–1) | M. Troupe (5) | 1512 | 18–7 | 4–2 |
| 27 | March 30 | Stanford | Hi Corbett Field | 8–7 | S. Manthei (5–2) | D. Schmidt (2–1) | | 4191 | 19–7 | 5–2 |
| 28 | March 31 | Stanford | Hi Corbett Field | 4–2 | K. Wade (4–0) | B. Mooneyham (5–1) | | 3506 | 20–7 | 6–2 |
| 29 | April 1 | Stanford | Hi Corbett Field | 6–2 | J. Farris (4–1) | J. Hochstatter (3–3) | | 2959 | 21–7 | 7–2 |

April: 9–7 (Conference: 5–4; Home: 5–2; Road: 4–4)

| # | Date | Opponent | Site/stadium | Score | Win | Loss | Save | Attendance | Overall record | Pac-12 Record |
|---|---|---|---|---|---|---|---|---|---|---|
| 25 | April 4 | Utah Valley | Brent Brown Ballpark | 4–5 | J. Gendlek (4–3) | T. Crawford (0–1) | | 2014 | 21–8 | 7–2 |
| 26 | April 5 | Utah | Spring Mobile Ballpark | 11–2 | K. Heyer (5–1) | J. Pond (2–5) | | 580 | 22–8 | 8–2 |
| 27 | April 6 | Utah | Spring Mobile Ballpark | 6–7 | M. Watrous (2–0) | S. Manthei (5–3) | T. Wagner (1) | 461 | 22–9 | 8–3 |
| 28 | April 7 | Utah | Spring Mobile Ballpark | 11–7 | T. Hale (1–0) | T. Tripp (0–2) | M. Troupe (6) | 565 | 23–9 | 9–3 |
| 29 | April 13 | UCLA | Hi Corbett Field | 4–3 | K. Heyer (6–1) | D. Berg (4–1) | | 4080 | 24–9 | 10–3 |
| 30 | April 14 | UCLA | Hi Corbett Field | 3–15 | N. Vander Tuig (4–2) | K. Wade (4–1) | | 2380 | 24–10 | 10–4 |
| 31 | April 15 | UCLA | Hi Corbett Field | 2–6 | Z. Weiss (2–1) | J. Farris (4–2) | | 2858 | 24–11 | 10–5 |
| 32 | April 17 | Arizona State | Packard Stadium | 8–12 | J. Lopez (1–0) | M. Troupe (2–1) | | 2972 | 24–12 | 10–5 |
| 33 | April 20 | Washington | Husky Ballpark | 10–2 | | | | | 25–12 | 11–5 |
| 34 | April 21 | Washington | Husky Ballpark | 4–1 | K. Wade (5–1) | T. Kane (2–1) | | 518 | 26–12 | 12–5 |
| 35 | April 22 | Washington | Husky Ballpark | 5–6 | T. Kane (3–1) | S. Manthei (5–4) | | 532 | 26–13 | 12–6 |
| 36 | April 27 | East Tennessee State | Hi Corbett Field | 24–7 | K. Heyer (8–1) | J. Long (2–6) | | 2047 | 27–13 | 12–6 |
| 37 | April 28 | East Tennessee State | Hi Corbett Field | 6–4 | K. Wade (6–1) | J. Long (5–5) | | 1706 | 28–13 | 12–6 |
| 38 | April 29 | East Tennessee State | Hi Corbett Field | 21–6 | J. Farris (5–2) | K. Doane | | 1737 | 29–13 | 12–6 |

May: 9–4 (Conference: 9–4; Home: 3–3; Road: 6–1)

| # | Date | Opponent | Site/stadium | Score | Win | Loss | Save | Attendance | Overall record | Pac-12 Record |
|---|---|---|---|---|---|---|---|---|---|---|
| 39 | May 4 | Oregon | Hi Corbett Field | 1–6 | A. Keudell (8–3) | K. Heyer (8–2) | | 3317 | 29–14 | 12–7 |
| 40 | May 5 | Oregon | Hi Corbett Field | 12–6 | T. Crawford (1–1) | J. Reed (5–3) | | 3385 | 30–14 | 13–7 |
| 41 | May 6 | Oregon | Hi Corbett Field | 1–3 | J. Sherfy (4–2) | J. Farris (5–3) | | 1996 | 30–15 | 13–8 |
| 42 | May 11 | California | Evans Diamond | 3–1 | K. Heyer (9–2) | M. Theofanopoul (3–5) | | 276 | 31–15 | 14–8 |
| 43 | May 12 | California | Evans Diamond | 4–1 | K. Wade (7–1) | M. Flemer (7–4) | | 474 | 32–15 | 15–8 |
| 44 | May 13 | California | Evans Diamond | 7–4 | T. Hale (2–0) | J. Jones (4–7) | | 774 | 33–15 | 16–8 |
| 45 | May 16 | Arizona State | Packard Stadium | 10–2 | M. Troupe (3–1) | D. Gillies (1–4) | | 3098 | 34–15 | 16–8 |
| 46 | May 18 | USC | Dedeaux Field | 11–1 | K. Heyer (10–2) | B. Mount (1–7) | | 501 | 35–15 | 17–8 |
| 47 | May 19 | USC | Dedeaux Field | 4–8 | A. Triggs (5–6) | K. Wade (7–2) | | 548 | 35–16 | 17–9 |
| 48 | May 20 | USC | Dedeaux Field | 6–1 | J. Farris (6–3) | S. Tarpley (5–3) | | 706 | 36–16 | 18–9 |
| 51 | May 25 | Arizona State | Hi Corbett Field | 1–0 | K. Heyer (11–2) | B. Rodgers (10–3) | | | 37–16 | 19–9 |
| 52 | May 26 | Arizona State | Hi Corbett Field | 7–9 | T. Williams (12–2) | K. Wade (7–3) | | 5677 | 37–17 | 19–10 |
| 53 | May 27 | Arizona State | Hi Corbett Field | 8–7 | S. Manthei (6–4) | R. Ravago (4–1) | | 2927 | 38–17 | 20–10 |

Postseason
NCAA Tucson Regional

| # | Date | Opponent | Site/stadium | Score | Win | Loss | Save | Attendance | Overall record | NCAAT Record |
|---|---|---|---|---|---|---|---|---|---|---|
| 54 | June 1 | Missouri | Hi Corbett Field | 15–3 | K. Heyer (12–2) | B. Holovach (7–5) | | 5086 | 39–17 | 1–0 |
| 55 | June 2 | Louisville | Hi Corbett Field | 16–4 | K. Wade (8–3) | J. Ruxer (8–3) | | 4007 | 40–17 | 2–0 |
| 56 | June 4 | Louisville | Hi Corbett Field | 16–3 | J. Farris (7–3) | J. Thompson (9–4) | None | 3485 | 41–17 | 3–0 |

NCAA Tucson Super Regional

| # | Date | Opponent | Site/stadium | Score | Win | Loss | Save | Attendance | Overall record | NCAAT Record |
|---|---|---|---|---|---|---|---|---|---|---|
| 57 | June 8 | St. John's | Hi Corbett Field | 7–6 | M. Troupe (4–1) | K. Kilpatrick (3–3) | | 2514 | 42–17 | 4–0 |
| 58 | June 9 | St. John's | Hi Corbett Field | 7–4 | K. Wade (9–3) | S. Hagan (9–3) | | 3907 | 43–17 | 5–0 |

College World Series

| # | Date | Opponent | Site/stadium | Score | Win | Loss | Save | Attendance | Overall record | NCAAT Record |
|---|---|---|---|---|---|---|---|---|---|---|
| 59 | June 15 | Florida State | TD Ameritrade Park | 4–3 | M. Troupe (5–1) | R. Benincasa | | 22,391 | 44–17 | 6–0 |
| 60 | June 17 | UCLA | TD Ameritrade Park | 4–0 | K. Wade (10–3) | N. Vander Tuig (10–4) | | 19,198 | 45–17 | 7–0 |
| 61 | June 21 | Florida State | TD Ameritrade Park | 10–3 | K. Heyer (13–2) | Leibrandt (8–3) | | 20,596 | 46–17 | 8–0 |
| 62 | June 24 | South Carolina | TD Ameritrade Park | 5–1 | K. Wade (11–3) | F. Koumas (2–3) | | 24,748 | 47–17 | 9–0 |
| 63 | June 25 | South Carolina | TD Ameritrade Park | 4–1 | M. Troupe (6–1) | M.Price (5–5) | | 23,872 | 48–17 | 10–0 |

=== Tucson Regional ===
Tucson Regional Teams
| (1) Arizona Wildcats | (4) Missouri Tigers | (2) New Mexico State Aggies | (3) Louisville Cardinals |

=== Tucson Super Regional ===
Tucson Super Regional Teams
| Arizona Wildcats | vs. | St. John's Red Storm |

== College World Series ==
2012 College World Series Teams
| (2) UCLA Bruins | Stony Brook Seawolves | Arizona Wildcats | (3) Florida State Seminoles | Kent State Golden Flashes | Arkansas Razorbacks | (1) Florida Gators | (8) South Carolina Gamecocks |

First round
2 | UCLA | 9
Stony Brook | 1
Arizona | 4
3 | Florida State | 3
Stony Brook | 2
3 | Florida State | 12
Kent State | 1
Arkansas | 8
1 | Florida | 3
8 | South Carolina | 7
Kent State | 5
1 | Florida | 4

Second round
2 | UCLA | 0
Arizona | 4
3 | Florida State | 4
2 | UCLA | 1
Arkansas | 2
8 | South Carolina | 1
Kent State | 1
8 | South Carolina | 4

Semifinals
Arizona | 10 | -
3 | Florida State | 3 | -
Arkansas | 0 | 2
8 | South Carolina | 2 | 3

Finals
Arizona | 5 | 4 | -
8 | South Carolina | 1 | 1 | -

== Rankings ==
Ranking movements Legend: ██ Increase in ranking ██ Decrease in ranking
| | Week | | | | | | | | | | | | | | | | | | | |
| Poll | Pre | 1 | 2 | 3 | 4 | 5 | 6 | 7 | 8 | 9 | 10 | 11 | 12 | 13 | 14 | 15 | 16 | 17 | 18 | Final |
|---|---|---|---|---|---|---|---|---|---|---|---|---|---|---|---|---|---|---|---|---|
| Coaches' | 20 | 20* | 13 | 11 | 9 | 11 | 12 | 8 | 12 | 16 | 16 | 16 | 18 | 17 | 13 | 11 | | | | |
| Baseball America | 5 | 8 | 7 | 7 | 6 | 5 | 8 | 4 | 4 | 13 | 11 | 11 | 14 | 14 | 13 | 13 | | | | |
| Collegiate Baseball^ | 20 | 22 | 18 | 18 | 13 | 14 | 15 | 5 | 8 | 8 | 6 | 6 | 10 | 8 | 8 | 8 | 7 | | | |
| NCBWA† | 18 | 18 | 14 | 12 | 9 | 10 | 13 | 10 | 12 | 16 | 18 | 16 | 19 | 17 | 13 | 13 | 9 | | | |

^ Collegiate Baseball ranked 40 teams in their preseason poll, but only ranked 30 teams weekly during the season.
† NCBWA ranks 30 teams in their preseason poll, but only ranks 25 teams weekly during the season.
* A new poll was not released for this week, so for comparison purposes, the previous week's ranking is inserted in this week's slot.

== Arizona Wildcats in the 2012 MLB draft ==
The following members of the Arizona Wildcats baseball program were drafted in the 2012 Major League Baseball draft.

| Player | Position | Round | Overall | MLB team |
|---|---|---|---|---|
| Alex Mejia | IF | 4th | 150th | St. Louis Cardinals |
| Rob Refsnyder | OF | 5th | 187th | New York Yankees |
| Kurt Heyer | RHP | 6th | 210th | St. Louis Cardinals |
| Seth Mejias-Brean | 3B | 8th | 262nd | Cincinnati Reds |
| Joey Rickard | CF | 9th | 302nd | Tampa Bay Rays |

- Refsnyder would eventually make his Major League debut with the Yankees in 2015
- Rickard would make his Major League Debut with the Baltimore Orioles in 2016.
- Mejia would make his Major League Debut with the St. Louis Cardinals in 2017.
