= Seth Mejias-Brean =

American baseball player (born 1991)

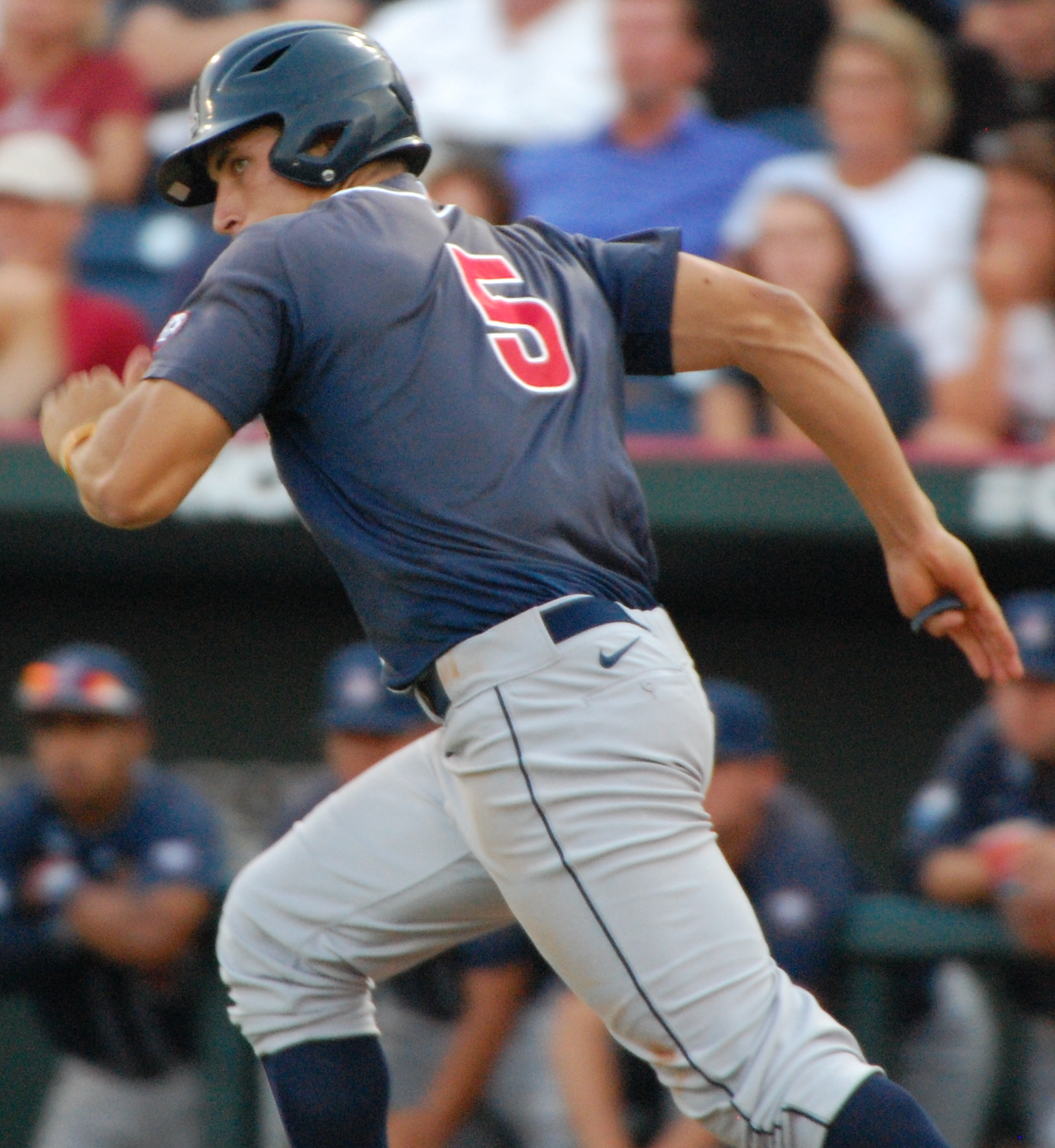
- Mejias-Brean at the 2012 College World Series
- Infielder
- Born: April 5, 1991 (age 35); Tucson, Arizona, U.S.
- Batted: Right Threw: Right

MLB debut
- September 4, 2019, for the San Diego Padres

Last MLB appearance
- September 28, 2019, for the San Diego Padres

MLB statistics
- Batting average: .233
- Home runs: 2
- Runs batted in: 5
- Stats at Baseball Reference

Teams
- San Diego Padres (2019)

Seth Wayne Mejias-Brean (born April 5, 1991) is an American former professional baseball infielder. He played in Major League Baseball (MLB) for the San Diego Padres.

== Playing career ==
Mejias-Brean attended Cienega High School in Pima County, Arizona. Undrafted out of high school, Mejias-Brean attended the University of Arizona, where he played college baseball for the Wildcats. He was a member of the 2012 Arizona Wildcats College World Series championship team. Mejias-Brean was drafted by the Cincinnati Reds in the 8th round, with the 262nd overall selection, of the 2012 MLB draft.

=== Cincinnati Reds ===
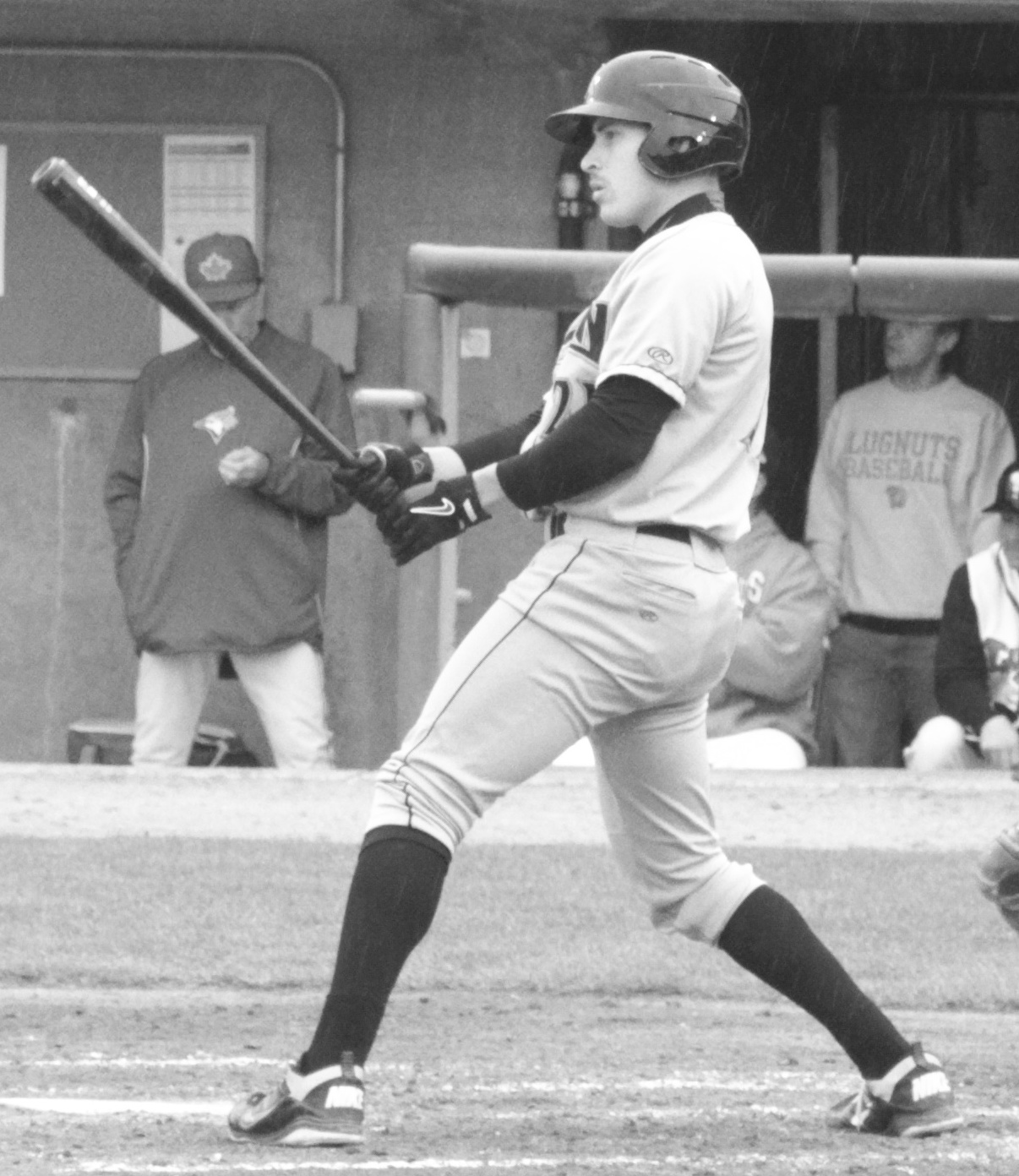
Mejias-Brean with the Dayton Dragons in 2012

Mejias-Brean played for the Billings Mustangs in 2012, hitting .313/.389/.536/.925 with 8 home runs and 40 RBI. He split the 2013 season between the Dayton Dragons and the Bakersfield Blaze, hitting .305/.379/.457/.836 with 11 home runs and 82 RBI. He split the 2014 season between Bakersfield and the Pensacola Blue Wahoos, hitting .270/.368/.406/.774 with 14 home runs and 67 RBI. He returned to Pensacola for the 2015 season, hitting .247/.352/.360/.712 with 6 home runs and 53 RBI. He played for the Louisville Bats in 2016, hitting .228/.290/.315/.605 with 6 home runs and 45 RBI. He returned to Louisville to open the 2017 season.

=== Seattle Mariners ===
On May 2, 2017, Mejias-Brean was traded to the Seattle Mariners. He split the season between Louisville, the Double–A Arkansas Travelers, and the Triple–A Tacoma Rainiers, combining to hit .268/.328/.346 with four home runs and 50 RBI. He split the 2018 season between Arkansas and Tacoma, hitting .258/.336/.376 with 10 home runs and 57 RBI. Mejias-Brean elected free agency following the season on November 2, 2018.

=== San Diego Padres ===
On December 21, 2018, Mejias-Brean signed a minor league contract with the San Diego Padres. He spent the 2019 minor league season with the El Paso Chihuahuas, hitting .316/.367/.455/.822 with 11 home runs and 66 RBI.

On September 3, 2019, the Padres selected Mejias-Brean's contract and promoted him to the major leagues. He made his major league debut on September 4 as a pinch hitter. Mejias-Brean was outrighted off the Padres roster on November 4, 2019, and later became a free agent.

However, Mejias–Brean re-signed with San Diego on a minor league deal on November 7, 2019. He did not play in a game in 2020 due to the cancellation of the minor league season because of the COVID-19 pandemic. On August 30, 2020, Mejias-Brean was released by the Padres organization.

=== Baltimore Orioles ===
On February 3, 2021, Mejias-Brean signed a minor league contract with the Baltimore Orioles organization. Mejias-Brean split the year between the Double-A Bowie Baysox and the Triple-A Norfolk Tides, slashing .234/.321/.390 across 64 games. He was released by the Orioles on August 17.

=== Seattle Mariners (second stint) ===
On December 22, 2021, Mejias-Brean signed a minor league contract with the Seattle Mariners. He did not make an appearance for the organization in 2022 and elected free agency following the season on November 10, 2022.

Mejias–Brean retired from professional baseball on January 4, 2023.

== Coaching career ==
On April 5, 2022, Mejias-Brean was announced as a bench coach for the Seattle Mariners’ Triple-A affiliate, the Tacoma Rainiers, alongside his 2018 Tacoma teammate Zach Vincej.

On January 26, 2023, Mejias-Brean was named the hitting coach for the Single-A Modesto Nuts, with Vincej as the manager, for the 2023 season. He reprised his role as hitting coach in 2024 with the High–A Everett AquaSox.

On January 14, 2025, Mejias-Brean was announced as the new hitting coach for Seattle's Double-A affiliate, the Arkansas Travelers. On January 20, 2026, Mejias-Brean was announced as the hitting coach for Triple-A Tacoma.
