= 2012 UCLA Bruins baseball team =

American college baseball season

2012 UCLA Bruins baseball

Pac-12 Regular season co-champions Los Angeles Super Regional champions Los Angeles Regional champions

College World Series vs. Arizona and Florida State, L, 0–4 and 1-4
- Conference: Pac-12 Conference

Ranking
- Coaches: No. 5
- Record: 48–16 (20–10 Pac-12)
- Head coach: John Savage (8th season)
- Assistant coaches: Jake Silverman (2nd season); T. J. Bruce (2nd season); Rex Peters (1st season)
- Home stadium: Jackie Robinson Stadium

2012 Pac-12 Conference baseball standings
	Conf.				Overall
Team	W		L	PCT	W		L	PCT
No. 4 UCLA ‍†‍‍^{y}	20	–	10	.667	48	–	16	.750
No. 11 Arizona ‍‍‍^{y}	20	–	10	.667	48	–	17	.738
No. 10 Oregon ‍‍‍^{y}	19	–	11	.633	46	–	19	.708
No. 13 Stanford ‍‍‍^{y}	18	–	12	.600	41	–	18	.695
No. 17 Oregon State ‍‍‍^{y}	18	–	12	.600	40	–	20	.667
Arizona State ‍‍‍	18	–	12	.600	36	–	20	.643
Washington ‍‍‍	13	–	17	.433	30	–	25	.545
California ‍‍‍	12	–	18	.400	29	–	25	.537
Washington State ‍‍‍	12	–	18	.400	28	–	28	.500
USC ‍‍‍	8	–	22	.267	23	–	32	.418
Utah ‍‍‍	7	–	23	.233	14	–	42	.250
† – Conference champion y – Invited to the 2012 NCAA Division I baseball tournament As of May 28, 2012; Rankings from Coaches' Poll

The 2012 UCLA Bruins baseball team represented the University of California, Los Angeles in the 2012 NCAA Division I baseball season. The team was in the Pac-12 Conference, and played their home games in Jackie Robinson Stadium. John Savage was in his eighth season as head coach. On March 13, 2012, the Bruins participated in the Dodgertown Classic for the third year, defeating USC 7–2 in the non-conference event. The Bruins tied for first in the Pac-12 Conference with Arizona, finishing with a 20–10 conference record. Seven players were picked in the 2012 Major League Baseball draft.

In the post-season, the Bruins performed well in the NCAA Regional and Super Regional rounds, winning 5 straight games. The Bruins defeated Creighton twice and New Mexico once to win the Los Angeles Regional. They then won the Los Angeles Super Regional by defeating TCU in two consecutive games. The team reached the College World Series for the fourth time in program history, beating Stony Brook in the first game. The Bruins lost the next two games to Arizona and Florida State, finishing the season with a 48–16 record.

== Previous season ==
UCLA finished the 2011 regular season as the #1 team in the Pacific-10 Conference with 18 conference wins and 9 losses, and a 35–24 overall record. They lost to UC Irvine in the Los Angeles Regional Finals of the 2011 NCAA Division I baseball tournament.

== Roster ==
2012 UCLA Bruins baseball team
Players
Coaches

#	Pos.	Name	B/T	Height	Weight	Year	Previous school	Home town
23	OF	Brenton Allen	L/L	6 ft 1 in (1.85 m)	215 lb (98 kg)	So	Gahr HS	Cerritos, California
25	OF	Beau Amaral	L/L	5 ft 11 in (1.8 m)	185 lb (84 kg)	Jr	Huntington Beach HS	Huntington Beach, California
26	RHP	David Berg	R/R	6 ft 0 in (1.83 m)	190 lb (86 kg)	Fr	Bishop Amat HS	Covina, California
45	OF	Christoph Bono	L/R	6 ft 1 in (1.85 m)	175 lb (79 kg)	Fr	Palo Alto HS	Palo Alto, California
16	C	Richard Brehaut	L/R	6 ft 2 in (1.88 m)	225 lb (102 kg)	RS So	Los Osos HS	Alta Loma, California
34	RHP	Chase Brewer	R/R	6 ft 4 in (1.93 m)	220 lb (100 kg)	RS Jr	Chaparral HS	Paradise Valley, Arizona
11	INF	Trevor Brown	R/R	6 ft 2 in (1.88 m)	195 lb (88 kg)	Jr	Hart HS	Valencia, California
24	OF	Brian Carroll	R/R	5 ft 10 in (1.78 m)	175 lb (79 kg)	So	Granite Hills HS	San Diego, California
41	C	Jason D'Andrea	R/R	6 ft 2 in (1.88 m)	195 lb (88 kg)	Fr	Chaminade HS	West Hills, California
40	RHP	Ryan Deeter	R/R	6 ft 0 in (1.83 m)	185 lb (84 kg)	RS So	Newark Memorial HS	Newark, California
30	RHP	Jake Ehret	R/R	6 ft 3 in (1.91 m)	200 lb (91 kg)	Fr	San Dimas HS	San Dimas, California
4	OF	Eric Filia-Snyder	L/R	6 ft 0 in (1.83 m)	180 lb (82 kg)	Fr	Edison HS	Huntington Beach, California
27	INF	Pat Gallagher	L/R	6 ft 2 in (1.88 m)	215 lb (98 kg)	So	Reno HS	Reno, Nevada
20	OF	Jeff Gelalich	L/R	6 ft 1 in (1.85 m)	205 lb (93 kg)	Jr	Bonita HS	LaVerne, California
36	INF	Matt Giovinazzo	R/R	6 ft 0 in (1.83 m)	195 lb (88 kg)	RS So	Laguna Hills HS	Laguna Hills, California
48	RHP	Scott Griggs	R/R	6 ft 4 in (1.93 m)	205 lb (93 kg)	Jr	San Ramon Valley HS	Alamo, California
28	INF	Justin Hazard	L/R	6 ft 2 in (1.88 m)	180 lb (82 kg)	Fr	Beckman HS	Tustin, California
8	C	Tyler Heineman	S/R	5 ft 11 in (1.8 m)	205 lb (93 kg)	Jr	Windward School	Pacific Palisades, California
33	RHP	Eric Jaffe	R/R	6 ft 4 in (1.93 m)	235 lb (107 kg)	RS Fr	Bishop O'Dowd HS	Oakland, California
1	INF	Chris Keck	L/R	6 ft 2 in (1.88 m)	190 lb (86 kg)	Fr	Amador Valley HS	Pleasanton, California
7	OF	Cody Keefer	L/R	6 ft 1 in (1.85 m)	195 lb (88 kg)	Jr	Davis Senior HS	Davis, California
31	RHP	Michael Kerman	R/R	6 ft 4 in (1.93 m)	220 lb (100 kg)	Jr	Beverly Hills HS/Long Beach CC	Beverly Hills, California
3	INF	Kevin Kramer	L/R	6 ft 0 in (1.83 m)	195 lb (88 kg)	Fr	Turlock HS	Turlock, California
35	RHP	Zack Ortiz	R/R	6 ft 0 in (1.83 m)	220 lb (100 kg)	Fr	Cypress HS	Garden Grove, California
9	RHP	Adam Plutko	R/R	6 ft 3 in (1.91 m)	195 lb (88 kg)	So	Glendora HS	Glendora, California
44	RHP	Madison Poole	R/R	6 ft 1 in (1.85 m)	220 lb (100 kg)	RS So	Bishop Blanchet HS	Seattle
18	INF	Cody Regis	L/R	6 ft 2 in (1.88 m)	220 lb (100 kg)	Jr	Glendora HS	Glendora, California
38	OF	Tyler Scott	R/R	6 ft 2 in (1.88 m)	220 lb (100 kg)	Fr	Marin Catholic HS	Novato, California
10	INF	Pat Valaika	R/R	5 ft 11 in (1.8 m)	195 lb (88 kg)	So	Hart HS	Valencia, California
21	RHP	Nick Vander Tuig	R/R	6 ft 3 in (1.91 m)	195 lb (88 kg)	So	Oakdale HS	Oakdale, California
12	LHP	Grant Watson	L/L	6 ft 0 in (1.83 m)	180 lb (82 kg)	Fr	Centennial HS	Bakersfield, California
47	INF	Aaron Weimer	L/R	5 ft 11 in (1.8 m)	180 lb (82 kg)	RS So	Bullard HS	Fresno, California
32	RHP	Zack Weiss	R/R	6 ft 3 in (1.91 m)	210 lb (95 kg)	So	Northwood HS	Irvine, California
5	INF	Kevin Williams	L/R	6 ft 0 in (1.83 m)	190 lb (86 kg)	So	Crespi HS	Van Nuys, California
14	INF	Shane Zeile	R/R	6 ft 1 in (1.85 m)	190 lb (86 kg)	Fr	Valencia HS	Valencia, California

Head coach

John Savage

Assistant coach(es)

Jake Silverman
T.J. Bruce
Rex Peters

Legend

- (C) Team captain
- (S) Suspended
- (I) Ineligible
- Injured
- Current redshirt

Roster
Last update: March 12, 2012

== Schedule ==
2012 UCLA Bruins baseball game log
Regular season
February: 5–3 (Conference: 0–0; Home: 4–3; Road: 1–0)

#	Date	Opponent	Site/stadium	Score	Win	Loss	Save	Attendance	Overall record	Pac-12 Record
1	February 17	Maryland	Jackie Robinson Stadium	1–2	M. Boyden (1–0)	S. Griggs (0–1)	J. Reed (1)	1,007	0–1	–
2	February 18	Maryland	Jackie Robinson Stadium	6–5	N. Vander Tuig (1–0)	C. Haslup (0–1)	S. Griggs (1)	927	1–1	–
3	February 19	Maryland	Jackie Robinson Stadium	1–5	B. Harman (1–0)	Z. Weiss (0–1)	None	819	1–2	–
4	February 21	Cal State Northridge	Matador Field	19–7	Z. Ortiz (1–0)	H. White (0–1)	None	372	2–2	–
5	February 24	Baylor	Jackie Robinson Stadium	3–15	T. Blank (3–0)	A. Plutko (0–1)	None	522	2–3	–
6	February 25	Baylor	Jackie Robinson Stadium	9–3	D. Berg (1–0)	D. Ashby (0–1)	None	709	3–3	–
7	February 26	Baylor	Jackie Robinson Stadium	8–6	G. Watson (1–0)	D. Newman (0–1)	S. Griggs (2)	776	4–3	–
8	February 28	Long Beach State	Jackie Robinson Stadium	9–1	G. Watson (2–0)	M. Johnson (0–1)	None	376	5–3	–

March: 14–2 (Conference: 6–2; Home: 8–2; Road: 6–0)

#	Date	Opponent	Site/stadium	Score	Win	Loss	Save	Attendance	Overall record	Pac-12 Record
9	March 2	Sacramento State	Jackie Robinson Stadium	5–2	A. Plutko (1–1)	H. Greenwood (1–2)	S. Griggs (3)	608	6–3	–
10	March 3	Sacramento State	Jackie Robinson Stadium	6–2	N. Vander Tuig (2–0)	T. Mendonca (2–1)	None	628	7–3	–
11	March 4	Sacramento State	Jackie Robinson Stadium	11–2	Z. Weiss (1–1)	Z. Morgan (0–2)	None	829	8–3	–
12	March 6	UC Riverside	Jackie Robinson Stadium	4–0	G. Watson (3–0)	M. Patito (1–1)	None	365	9–3	–
13	March 9	Georgia	Foley Field	2–0	A. Plutko (2–1)	A. Wood (3–1)	None	1,947	10–3	–
14	March 10	Georgia	Foley Field	7–6	R. Deeter (1–0)	M. Palazzone (0–1)	S. Griggs (4)	2,255	11–3	–
15	March 11	Georgia	Foley Field	7–3	C. Brewer (1–0)	T. Hicks (2–2)	None	1,967	12–3	–
16	March 13	USC	Dodger Stadium	7–2	G. Watson (4–0)	B. Garcia (1–2)	None	6,034	13–3	–
17	March 16	Arizona State	Jackie Robinson Stadium	6–5	D. Berg (2–0)	J. Barrett (1–2)	None	611	14–3	1–0
18	March 18	Arizona State	Jackie Robinson Stadium	3–4	T. Williams (5–0)	N. Vander Tuig (2–1)	J. Barrett (1)	929	14–4	1–1
19	March 18	Arizona State	Jackie Robinson Stadium	4–2	G. Watson (5–0)	A. Blackford (0–2)	S. Griggs (5)	929	15–4	2–1
20	March 23	Washington State	Jackie Robinson Stadium	12–3	A. Plutko (3–1)	J.D. Leckenby (3–3)	None	637	16–4	3–1
21	March 24	Washington State	Jackie Robinson Stadium	12–3	D. Berg (3–0)	R. Ochoa (0–1)	None	720	17–4	4–1
22	March 26	Washington State	Jackie Robinson Stadium	4–10	K. Swannack (2–2)	G. Watson (5–1)	S. Simon (2)	319	17–5	4–2
23	March 30	Utah	Spring Mobile Ballpark	16–0	A. Plutko (4–1)	J. Pond (2–4)	None	2,000	18–5	5–2
24	March 31	Utah	Spring Mobile Ballpark	9–6	N. Vander Tuig (3–1)	B. Duke (2–1)	S. Griggs (6)	1,250	19–5	6–2

April: 9–7 (Conference: 6–7; Home: 5–4; Road: 4–3)

#	Date	Opponent	Site/stadium	Score	Win	Loss	Save	Attendance	Overall record	Pac-12 Record
25	April 1	Utah	Spring Mobile Ballpark	5–1	G. Watson (6–1)	T. Vocca (1–3)	None	478	20–5	7–2
26	April 5	Oregon	Jackie Robinson Stadium	2–6					20–6	7–3
27	April 6	Oregon	Jackie Robinson Stadium	3–8					20–7	7–4
28	April 7	Oregon	Jackie Robinson Stadium	8–6					21–7	8–4
29	April 10	Cal State Fullerton	Jackie Robinson Stadium	4–2	G. Watson (7–1)	K. Gauna (3–3)	S. Griggs (8)	871	22–7	8–4
30	April 13	Arizona	Hi Corbett Field	3–4	K. Heyer (6–1)	D. Berg (4–1)	None	4,080	22–8	8–5
31	April 14	Arizona	Hi Corbett Field	15–3	N. Vander Tuig (4–2)	K. Wade (4–1)	None	2,380	23–8	9–5
32	April 15	Arizona	Hi Corbett Field	6–2	Z. Weiss (2–1)	J. Farris (4–2)	None	2,858	24–8	10–5
33	April 17	Cal State Northridge	Jackie Robinson Stadium	12–4					25–8	10–5
34	April 20	Oregon State	Goss Stadium	4–0					26–8	11–5
35	April 21	Oregon State	Goss Stadium	0–3					26–9	11–6
36	April 22	Oregon State	Goss Stadium	6–7					26–10	11–7
37	April 24	UC Irvine	Jackie Robinson Stadium	9–3					27–10	11–7
38	April 27	Stanford	Jackie Robinson Stadium	2–7					27–11	11–8
39	April 28	Stanford	Jackie Robinson Stadium	7–4					28–11	12–8
40	April 29	Stanford	Jackie Robinson Stadium	2–7					28–12	12–9

May: 14–2 (Conference: 8–1; Home: 5–1; Road: 9–1)

#	Date	Opponent	Site/stadium	Score	Win	Loss	Save	Attendance	Overall record	Pac-12 Record
41	May 1	Long Beach State	Blair Field	2–1	G. Watson (8–1)	N. Sabo (0–5)	S. Griggs (10)	1,342	29–12	12–9
42	May 5	Purdue	Jackie Robinson Stadium	5–1					30–12	12–9
43	May 5	Purdue	Jackie Robinson Stadium	3–2					31–12	12–9
44	May 6	Purdue	Jackie Robinson Stadium	11–15					31–13	12–9
45	May 8	Pepperdine	Eddy D. Field Stadium	6–2					32–13	12–9
46	May 11	Washington	Husky Ballpark	2–0					33–13	13–9
47	May 12	Washington	Husky Ballpark	11–3					34–13	14–9
48	May 13	Washington	Husky Ballpark	4–2					35–13	15–9
49	May 15	Cal State Fullerton	Goodwin Field	6–3					36–13	15–9
50	May 18	California	Evans Diamond	7–2					37–13	16–9
51	May 19	California	Evans Diamond	8–5					38–13	17–9
52	May 20	California	Evans Diamond	5–6					38–14	17–10
53	May 22	UC Irvine	Cicerone Field	6–2					39–14	17–10
54	May 25	USC	Jackie Robinson Stadium	3–1					40–14	18–10
55	May 26	USC	Jackie Robinson Stadium	6–5					41–14	19–10
56	May 27	USC	Jackie Robinson Stadium	7–6	S. Griggs (3–1)	M. Viramontes (1–2)	None	1,778	42–14	20–10

Postseason
NCAA Los Angeles Regional

#	Date	Opponent	Site/stadium	Score	Win	Loss	Save	Attendance	Overall record	NCAAT Record
57	June 1	Creighton	Jackie Robinson Stadium	3–0	A. Plutko (10–3)	T. Blach (6–6)	None	1,570	43–14	1–0
58	June 2	New Mexico	Jackie Robinson Stadium	7–1	N. Vander Tuig (9–3)	G. Sanchez (8–3)	None	1,601	44–14	2–0
59	June 3	Creighton	Jackie Robinson Stadium	13–5	Z. Weiss (3–2)	N. Musec (3–4)	None	1,291	45–14	3–0

NCAA Los Angeles Super Regional

#	Date	Opponent	Site/stadium	Score	Win	Loss	Save	Attendance	Overall record	NCAAT Record
60	June 8	TCU	Jackie Robinson Stadium	6–2	A. Plutko (11–3)	B. Finnegan (4–5)	None	2,042	46–14	4–0
61	June 9	TCU	Jackie Robinson Stadium	4–1	N. Vander Tuig (10–3)	P. Morrison (9–2)	D. Berg (1)	2,135	47–14	5–0

College World Series

#	Date	Opponent	Site/stadium	Score	Win	Loss	Save	Attendance	Overall record	NCAAT Record
62	June 15	Stony Brook	TD Ameritrade Park	9–1	A. Plutko (12–3)	T. Johnson (12–2)	None	21,662	48–14	6–0
63	June 17	Arizona	TD Ameritrade Park	0–4	K. Wade (10–3)	N. Vander Tuig (10–4)	None	19,198	48–15	6–1
64	June 19	Florida State	TD Ameritrade Park	1–4	S. Sitz (4–3)	Z. Weiss (3–3)	R. Benincasa (16)	23,409	48–16	6–2

== Rankings ==
Ranking movements Legend: ██ Increase in ranking ██ Decrease in ranking — = Not ranked
	Week																		
Poll	Pre	1	2	3	4	5	6	7	8	9	10	11	12	13	14	15	16	17	Final
Coaches'	18	18*	24	16	12	12	9	7	11	7	11	14	11	11	10	4	—	—	5
Baseball America	14	22	17	16	9	7	6	5	17	11	12	14	11	11	9	2	—	—	5
Collegiate Baseball^	19	—	28	27	17	16	11	4	11	7	10	11	11	11	10	7	6	4	5
NCBWA†	20	27	25	20	14	11	8	5	11	9	12	15	12	12	10	5	4	3	5

^ Collegiate Baseball ranked 40 teams in their preseason poll, but only ranked 30 teams weekly during the season.
† NCBWA ranks 30 teams in their preseason poll, but only ranks 25 teams weekly during the season.
* A new poll was not released for this week, so for comparison purposes, the previous week's ranking is inserted in this week's slot.

== UCLA Bruins in the 2012 MLB draft ==
The following members of the UCLA Bruins baseball program were drafted in the 2012 Major League Baseball draft.

Player	Position	Round	Overall	MLB team
Jeff Gelalich	OF	1st	57th	Cincinnati Reds
Beau Amaral	CF	7th	232nd	Cincinnati Reds
Tyler Heineman	C	8th	249th	Houston Astros
Scott Griggs	RHP	8th	266th	Los Angeles Dodgers
Trevor Brown	C	10th	328th	San Francisco Giants
Eric Jaffe	RHP	11th	351st	Chicago White Sox
Cody Keefer	OF	15th	467th	Miami Marlins
