= John Bishop (sportscaster) =

American sportscaster

John Bishop is a sportscaster for NRG Media. He is the radio voice of the Creighton Bluejays basketball and baseball teams, calls the preliminary games of the College World Series for Westwood One and is the co-host of Unsportsmanlike Conduct for KOZN. Bishop grew up in Fremont, Nebraska and graduated from the University of Nebraska–Lincoln. After graduating in 1994, he became the voice for Nebraska Cornhuskers baseball and worked pre and postgame radio on Cornhusker football broadcasts. He was the television voice of the Nebraska state boys and girls high school basketball championships for KOLN/KGIN from 1996 to 2010. Bishop subsequently become the voice of Bluejays baseball in 2006. In 2012, Bishop transferred from KLIN to NRG Media sister station KOZN in August 2012. In 2013, Bishop was given the additional responsibility of the men's basketball play-by-play voice and began working with Nick Bahe as analyst. Since 2012, Bishop has also served as one of the College World Series play-by-play men, working alongside Kevin Kugler to call all games but the championship.
