= Hi Corbett Field =

Baseball stadium in Tucson, Arizona

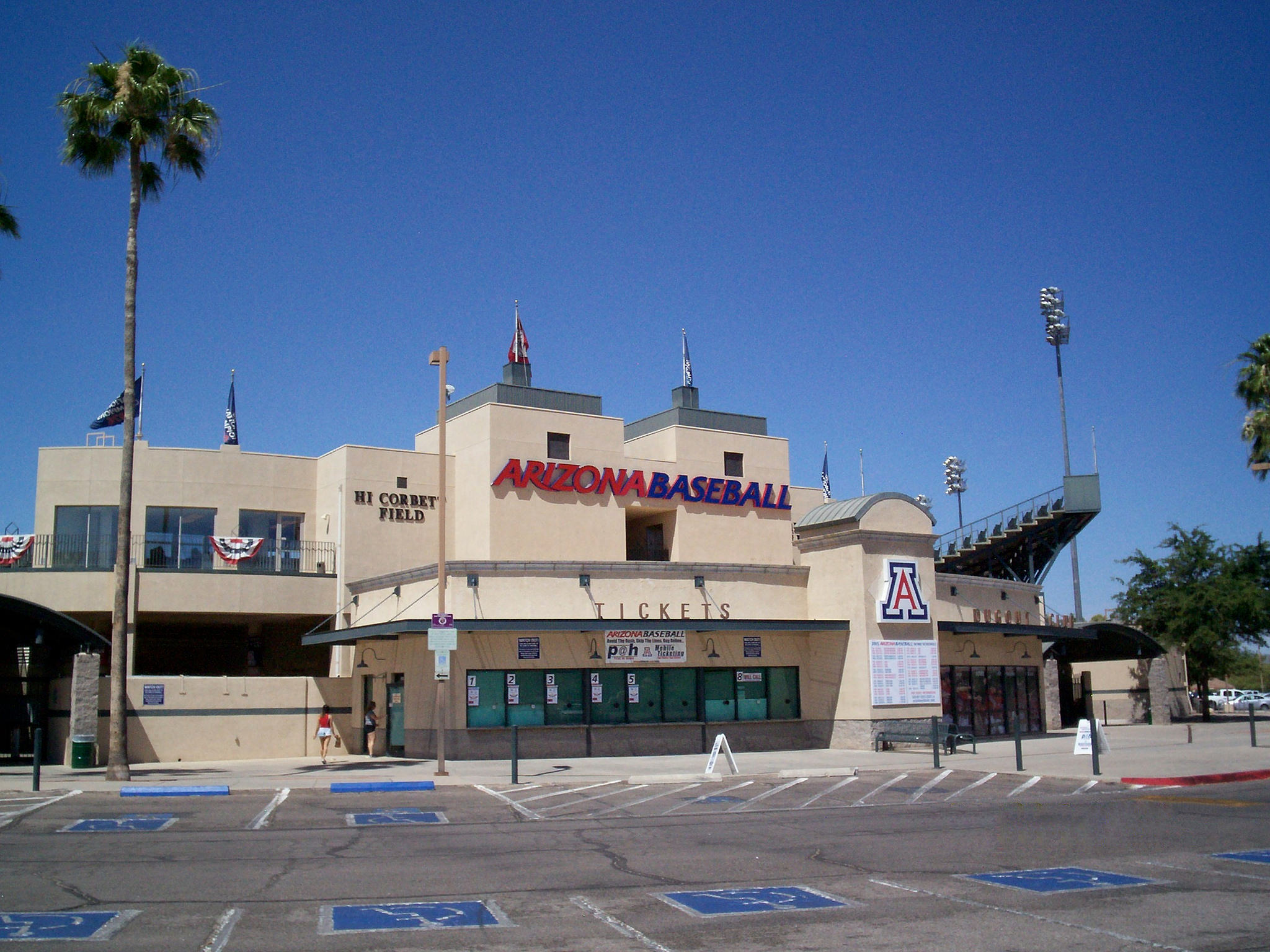
- Hi Corbett Field entrance, 2015

- Location within Arizona Location within the United States
- Interactive map of Hi Corbett Field
- Former names: Randolph Municipal Baseball Park
- Location: Tucson, Arizona, U.S.
- Coordinates: 32°12′48″N 110°55′9″W
- Owner: City of Tucson
- Operator: University of Arizona
- Capacity: 9,500
- Surface: Natural grass
- Field size: Left Field – 366 ft (112 m); Center-Left – 410 ft (125 m); Center Field – 392 ft (119 m); Center-Right – 405 ft (123 m); Right Field – 349 ft (106 m)

Construction
- Opened: 1937; 89 years ago
- Renovated: 1972, 1992, 1997, 1999, 2012

Tenants
- Colorado Rockies (spring training) (1993–2010); Cleveland Indians (spring training) (1947–1992); Tucson Toros (PCL) (1969–1997); Tucson Toros (GBL) (2009–2011); Arizona Heat (NPF) (2004–2007); Tucson Cowboys (A-TL/SIL) (1937–1958); USA Baseball (headquarters) (1997–2003); Tucson Javelinas (AFL) (1992–1993); Tucson Lizards (A-TL) (1932); Arizona Wildcats (NCAA) (2012–present)

Hi Corbett Field is a baseball park in the southwestern United States, located in Tucson, Arizona. With a seating capacity of approximately 9,500, it was the spring training home of the Colorado Rockies and Cleveland Indians of Major League Baseball, and is currently home to the University of Arizona Wildcats of the Big 12 Conference.

== Venue history and statistics ==
First teams played at the field in 1937. Hi Corbett Field was originally called Randolph Municipal Baseball Park. In 1951, it was renamed in honor of Hiram "Hi" Stevens Corbett (1886–1967), a former Arizona state senator who was instrumental in bringing spring training to Tucson, specifically by convincing Bill Veeck to bring the Cleveland Indians to Tucson in 1947. Veeck owned a ranch in Tucson at the time, and he and players sometimes rode Veeck's horses after the games. Veeck said that he moved the team's training camp from Florida to Arizona to avoid Florida's Jim Crow laws.

Hi Corbett was remodeled in 1972 and renovated in 1992, 1997, 1999, and 2012. It is part of a larger city park complex, Gene C. Reid Park (which also includes the Reid Park Zoo) and Randolph Park, located between Broadway Boulevard and 22nd Street in midtown Tucson.

The main playing field's dimensions are as follows: 349 feet (106 m) in right field, 366 feet (112 m) in left field, and 410 feet (125 m) at its deepest in center field. The ballpark currently has a seating capacity of 9,500, including 598 box seats, 8,350 reserved seats, and 562 bleacher seats. There are also two ancillary fields for use in spring training, but these make no provision for spectators. Hi Corbett's diamond is aligned southwest (home plate to center field), at an approximate elevation of 2,480 feet (755 m) above sea level.

For many years, Emil Bossard, groundskeeper for the Cleveland Indians, was in charge of Hi Corbett Field during spring training. In 1959, he was considered the top groundskeeper in Major League Baseball and was inducted into the MLB Groundskeeper Hall of Fame in 2012. Emil Bossard Field and the street Bossard Place both located at Reid Park, are named in his honor.

== Teams ==
Hi Corbett served as the spring training home of Cleveland from 1947 through 1992. Cleveland announced in 1990 that they would depart Tucson and the city tried to attract the Baltimore Orioles to move to Arizona. Parts of the 1989 movie Major League were filmed at Hi Corbett Field, where the production used members of the University of Arizona baseball team as extras.

From 1993 to 2010, Hi Corbett was the pre-season home of the expansion Colorado Rockies, who moved into Hi Corbett with their inaugural spring training.

Hi Corbett is also closely associated with minor league baseball. Aside from the Lizards, the Tucson Cowboys (Class C; Arizona–Texas League) played at Hi Corbett intermittently from the late 1930s until 1958. The original Tucson Toros (Class AAA; Pacific Coast League) played there from their inception in 1969 until 1997 (see below for new Toros team). The largest Tucson Toros crowd at Hi Corbett was 12,863 on May 17, 1981, against Salt Lake City. In 1997, the Toros essentially exchanged ownership and franchises with the nearby Phoenix Firebirds, so that the ex-Toros played in Scottsdale Stadium as the Firebirds, and the ex-Firebirds played at Hi Corbett as the Toros. In 1998 the Phoenix team relocated to Fresno, California and was renamed the Fresno Grizzlies, and the Tucson Toros became the Tucson Sidewinders, and played in the new Tucson Electric Park, which was renamed in January 2011 to Kino Veterans Memorial Stadium.

The Arizona Fall League, a short-season developmental league for MLB prospects, fielded a team at Hi Corbett during 1992 and 1993, known as the Tucson Javelinas. The team relocated to Peoria before the 1994 season (becoming the Peoria Javelinas) to limit travel distances to the Phoenix metropolitan area.

USA Baseball was headquartered at Hi Corbett from 1997 to 2003.

From 2004 to 2007 Hi Corbett was home to the Arizona Heat women's professional softball team.

In addition to the large number of visiting teams that have appeared there as part of regular league play, Hi Corbett has hosted exhibition games featuring the Colorado Silver Bullets, Houston Astros, and the University of Arizona, among others. Baseball Hall of Fame members who played at Hi Corbett include Mickey Mantle, Willie Mays, Ted Williams, and many others.

On May 21, 2009, a new Tucson Toros club began play at Hi Corbett as a member of the independent Golden Baseball League. Hi Corbett Field was the home stadium of the Toros until they were evicted by the city of Tucson in 2011 before they could join the North American League.

== University of Arizona ==
In 2012, the ballpark became the new home of the university of Arizona Wildcats baseball team. Through the first three-game series of the season against North Dakota State, the attendance at the stadium was a total of 8,870, which was nearly ¼ of the total home attendance for the Wildcats' previous season at Sancet Stadium, their longtime home on campus, located adjacent to McKale Center and Arizona Stadium. Hi Corbett Field hosted both an NCAA Regional and Super Regional, as Arizona won both to advance to the 2012 College World Series. The relocation of the Wildcat baseball program to Hi Corbett has been noted as a major factor in the team's successful 2012 season, and their fourth national championship.

== Future ==
In 2007, the Rockies asked for a package of improvements to Hi Corbett potentially totaling $10–20 million under the threat of a possible move to Goodyear. In response, Pima County chartered a regional sports and tourism authority, funded by tourism and other taxes. Such authority was approved both by the Arizona Legislature and voters of the county. The departure of the Chicago White Sox from Kino Veterans Memorial Stadium, has forced team management to expedite plans for a future move, as the Rockies have stated that they need two other teams in order for Tucson to be a viable spring training town for them.

The Rockies decided to move to the new Salt River Fields at Talking Stick in 2011 on tribal land owned by the Salt River Pima-Maricopa Indian Community near Scottsdale. The Arizona Diamondbacks share that facility.

=== University of Arizona ===
As noted above, in an effort to have its baseball program compete in the best possible facilities, in August 2011, the University of Arizona signed an agreement with the city of Tucson for Arizona baseball to play its home games at Hi Corbett for the 2012 season; the initial agreement was for five years with an option to renew the contract. The university has made several upgrades to the facility, where the Wildcats previously played selected games in the 1960s and '70s. Hi Corbett is located about three miles (5 km) southeast of the university campus.

In 2013, the Wildcats ranked 21st among Division I baseball programs in attendance, averaging 2,733 per home game.

In March 2017, the university signed a new 25-year lease on Hi Corbett Field, taking over day-to-day management of the baseball stadium from the City of Tucson.

In June 2024, Hi Corbett Field will host a college baseball regional, as the University of Arizona won the Pac-12 regular season and Pac-12 conference tournament.

== Gallery ==
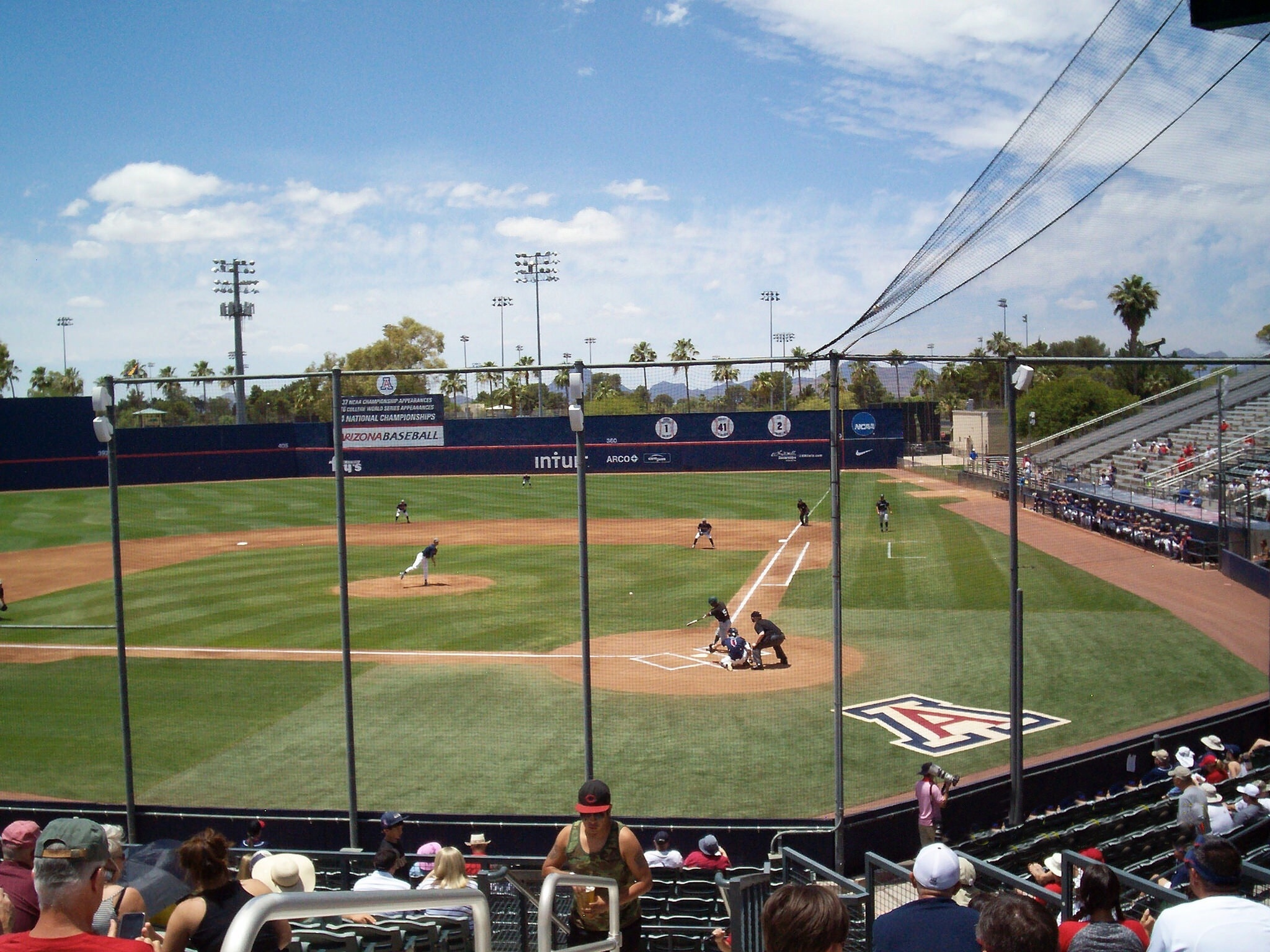
University of Arizona Wildcat baseball team vs University of Hawaii, May 2015

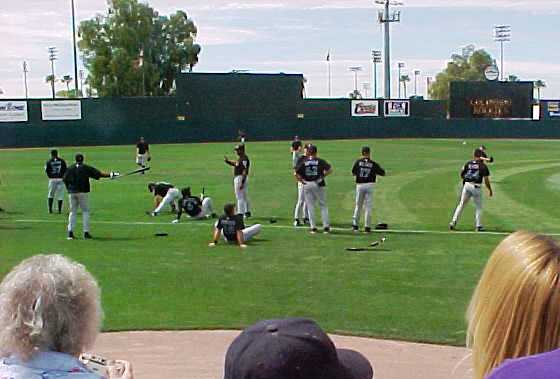
Warming up at Hi Corbett Field, Spring Training 2003

== See also ==
- List of NCAA Division I baseball venues

Events and tenants
Preceded by (GBL) Bruce Hurst Field (NoL) Silver Cross Field	Host of the GBL/NoL All-Star Game; Hi Corbett Field; 2010	Succeeded by final
