= 2012 NCAA Division I baseball tournament =

American college sports championship

- Season: 2012
- Teams: 64
- Finals site: TD Ameritrade Park; Omaha, Nebraska
- Champions: Arizona (4th title)
- Runner-up: South Carolina (11th CWS Appearance)
- Winning coach: Andy Lopez (2nd title)
- MOP: Rob Refsnyder (Arizona)

The 2012 NCAA Division I baseball tournament began on Friday, June 1, 2012, as part of the 2012 NCAA Division I baseball season. The 64 team double elimination tournament concluded with the 2012 College World Series in Omaha, Nebraska, starting on June 15 and ending on June 25.

The 64 NCAA Division I college baseball teams were selected out of an eligible 297 teams. Thirty teams were awarded an automatic bid as champions of their conferences, and 34 teams were selected at-large by the NCAA Division I Baseball Committee.

== Bids ==
=== Automatic bids ===
Conference champions from 30 Division I conferences earned automatic bids to regionals. The remaining 34 spots were awarded to schools as at-large invitees.

School	Conference	Record (Conf)	Berth	Last NCAA appearance
Stony Brook	America East	46–11 (21–3)	Won Tournament	2010
Georgia Tech	ACC	36–24 (12–18)	Won Tournament	2011
Belmont	Atlantic Sun	39–22 (17–10)	Won Tournament	2011
Dayton	Atlantic 10	31–28 (17–7)	Won Tournament	First appearance
Missouri	Big 12	32–26 (10–14)	Won Tournament	2009
St. John's	Big East	37–21 (18–9)	Won Tournament	2011
Coastal Carolina	Big South	41–17 (18–5)	Won Tournament	2011
Purdue	Big Ten	44–12 (17–7)	Won Tournament	1987
Cal State Fullerton	Big West	35–19 (17–7)	Won Regular season	2011
UNC Wilmington	Colonial	38–21 (24–6)	Won Tournament	2008
UAB	Conference USA	32–28 (9–15)	Won Tournament	1991
Valparaiso	Horizon	35–23 (22–8)	Won Tournament	1968
Cornell	Ivy League	31–15 (14–6)	Won Tournament	1977
Manhattan	Metro Atlantic	33–25 (18–6)	Won Tournament	2011
Kent State	Mid-American	41–17 (24–3)	Won Tournament	2011
Bethune-Cookman	Mid-Eastern	34–25 (18–5)	Won Tournament	2011
Creighton	Missouri Valley	26–28 (6–14)	Won Tournament	2011
New Mexico	Mountain West	36–22 (18–6)	Won Tournament	2011
Sacred Heart	Northeast	25–30 (19–13)	Won Tournament	2011
Austin Peay State	Ohio Valley	38–22 (19–7)	Won Tournament	2011
UCLA	Pac-12	42–14 (20–10)	Won Regular season	2011
Army	Patriot	41–13 (18–2)	Won Tournament	2009
Mississippi State	Southeastern	39–22 (16–14)	Won Tournament	2011
Samford	Southern	39–21 (19–11)	Won Tournament	First appearance
Texas–Arlington	Southland	36–23 (19–14)	Won Tournament	2006
Prairie View A&M	Southwestern Athletic	33–16 (15–8)	Won Tournament	2007
Oral Roberts	Summit	37–23 (17–6)	Won Tournament	2011
Louisiana–Monroe	Sun Belt	31–28 (15–15)	Won Tournament	2000
Pepperdine	West Coast	34–21 (16–8)	Won Regular season	2008
Fresno State	Western Athletic	30–26 (8–10)	Won Tournament	2011

=== By conference ===
Conference	Total	Schools
SEC	8	Arkansas, Florida, Kentucky, LSU, Ole Miss, Mississippi State, South Carolina, Vanderbilt
ACC	7	Clemson, Florida State, Georgia Tech, Miami (Fla.), North Carolina, North Carolina State, Virginia
Pac-12	5	Arizona, Oregon, Oregon State, Stanford, UCLA
Big 12	4	Baylor, Missouri, Oklahoma, Texas A&M
Conference USA	4	UAB, East Carolina, Rice, UCF
Missouri Valley	3	Creighton, Indiana State, Missouri State
Southern	3	Appalachian State, College of Charleston, Samford
Big East	2	Louisville, St. John's
Big Ten	2	Michigan State, Purdue
Mountain West	2	New Mexico, TCU
Southland	2	Sam Houston State, Texas-Arlington
West Coast	2	Pepperdine, San Diego
WAC	2	Fresno State, New Mexico State
America East	1	Stony Brook
Atlantic Sun	1	Belmont
Atlantic 10	1	Dayton
Big South	1	Coastal Carolina
Big West	1	Cal St. Fullerton
Colonial	1	UNC Wilmington
Horizon	1	Valparaiso
Independent	1	Dallas Baptist
Ivy	1	Cornell
MAAC	1	Manhattan
Mid-American	1	Kent State
MEAC	1	Bethune-Cookman
NEC	1	Sacred Heart
Ohio Valley	1	Austin Peay State
Patriot	1	Army
SWAC	1	Prairie View
Summit	1	Oral Roberts
Sun Belt	1	Louisiana-Monroe

== National seeds ==
These eight teams would automatically host a Super Regional had they advanced to that round. Only North Carolina failed to advance out of its regional.

Bold indicates CWS participant.

1. **Florida**
2. **UCLA**
3. **Florida State**
4. Baylor
5. Oregon
6. North Carolina
7. LSU
8. **South Carolina**

== Regionals and Super Regionals ==
Bold indicates winner. * indicates extra innings.

=== Gainesville Super Regional ===
Regional	Regional
1	**Florida**	**4**
4	Bethune-Cookman	0
1	**Florida**	**6**
2	Georgia Tech	2
3	College of Charleston	4
2	**Georgia Tech**	**8**
Gainesville Regional – McKethan Stadium
4	Bethune-Cookman	2
3	**College of Charleston**	**8**
3	College of Charleston	0
2	**Georgia Tech**	**3**
1	**NC State**	**16**
4	Sacred Heart	5
1	NC State	8
2	**Vanderbilt**	**9**
3	UNC Wilmington	2
2	**Vanderbilt**	**8**
Raleigh Regional – Doak Field
4	Sacred Heart	4
3	**UNC Wilmington**	**13**
3	UNC Wilmington	5
1	**NC State**	**17**

Regional Final
1	**Florida**	**15**	-
2	Georgia Tech	3	-
2	Vanderbilt	5	7
1	**NC State**	**6**	**9**

Super Regional
1	**Florida**	**7**	**9**^{10}	-
NC State	1	8	-

=== Columbia Super Regional ===
Regional	Regional
1	**South Carolina**	**7**
4	Manhattan	0
1	**South Carolina**	**5**^{12}
2	Clemson	4
3	Coastal Carolina	3
2	**Clemson**	**11**
Columbia Regional – Carolina Stadium
4	Manhattan	1
3	**Coastal Carolina**	**11**
3	Coastal Carolina	3
2	**Clemson**	**5**
1	**Virginia**	**9**
4	Army	1
1	Virginia	5
3	**Appalachian State**	**6**
3	**Appalachian State**	**5**
2	Oklahoma	4
Charlottesville Regional – Davenport Field
4	Army	1
2	**Oklahoma**	**2**^{10}
2	**Oklahoma**	**5**
1	Virginia	4

Regional Final
1	**South Carolina**	**4**	-
2	Clemson	3	-
3	Appalachian State	6	2
2	**Oklahoma**	**14**	**5**

Super Regional
8	**South Carolina**	**5**	**5**	-
Oklahoma	0	1	-

=== Los Angeles Super Regional ===
Regional	Regional
1	**UCLA**	**3**
4	Creighton	0
1	**UCLA**	**7**
3	New Mexico	1
3	**New Mexico**	**4**
2	San Diego	0
Los Angeles Regional – Jackie Robinson Stadium
4	**Creighton**	**8**
2	San Diego	2
4	**Creighton**	**7**
3	New Mexico	2
1	**Texas A&M**	**4**
4	Dayton	1
1	Texas A&M	3
3	**Ole Miss**	**6**
3	**Ole Miss**	**6**
2	TCU	2
College Station Regional – Olsen Field
4	Dayton	12
2	**TCU**	**28**
2	**TCU**	**10**
1	Texas A&M	2

Regional Final
1	**UCLA**	**13**	-
4	Creighton	5	-
3	Ole Miss	2	4
2	**TCU**	**5**	**7**

Super Regional
2	**UCLA**	**6**	**4**	-
TCU	2	1	-

=== Baton Rouge Super Regional ===
Regional	Regional
1	**LSU**	**4**
4	Louisiana–Monroe	1
1	**LSU**	**7**
2	Oregon State	1
3	Belmont	1
2	**Oregon State**	**2**
Baton Rouge Regional - Alex Box Stadium
4	**Louisiana–Monroe**	**6**
3	Belmont	3
4	Louisiana–Monroe	2
2	**Oregon State**	**11**
1	Miami (FL)	2
4	**Stony Brook**	**10**
4	Stony Brook	8
2	**UCF**	**9**
3	Missouri State	1
2	**UCF**	**2**
Coral Gables Regional – Alex Rodriguez Park at Mark Light Field
1	Miami (FL)	2
3	**Missouri State**	**12**
3	Missouri State	7
4	**Stony Brook**	**10**

Regional Final
1	**LSU**	**6**^{10}	-
2	Oregon State	5	-
2	UCF	5	6
4	**Stony Brook**	**12**	**10**

Super Regional
7	LSU	**5**^{12}	1	2
**Stony Brook**	4	**3**	**7**

=== Tucson Super Regional ===
Regional	Regional
1	**North Carolina**	**7**
4	Cornell	4
1	North Carolina	4
3	**St. John's**	**5**
3	**St. John's**	**11**
2	East Carolina	3
Chapel Hill Regional – Boshamer Stadium
4	Cornell	6
2	**East Carolina**	**10**
2	East Carolina	3
1	**North Carolina**	**5**
1	**Arizona**	**15**
4	Missouri	3
1	**Arizona**	**16**
3	Louisville	4
3	**Louisville**	**3**
2	New Mexico State	2
Tucson Regional – Hi Corbett Field
4	**Missouri**	**6**
2	New Mexico State	2
4	Missouri	3
3	**Louisville**	**11**

Regional Final
3	**St. John's**	**9**	-
1	North Carolina	5	-
1	**Arizona**	**16**	-
3	Louisville	3	-

Super Regional
St. John's	6	4	-
**Arizona**	**7**^{10}	**7**	-

=== Tallahassee Super Regional ===
Regional	Regional
1	**Florida State**	**2**
4	UAB	1
1	**Florida State**	**8**
3	Samford	1
3	**Samford**	**5**
2	Mississippi State	0
Tallahassee Regional - Dick Howser Stadium
4	UAB	1
2	**Mississippi State**	**8**
2	Mississippi State	2
3	**Samford**	**3**
1	**Stanford**	**9**
4	Fresno State	1
1	**Stanford**	**5**
2	Pepperdine	4
3	Michigan State	2
2	**Pepperdine**	**6**
Palo Alto Regional - Sunken Diamond
4	**Fresno State**	**8**
3	Michigan State	2
4	Fresno State	5
2	**Pepperdine**	**8**

Regional Final
1	**Florida State**	**5**	-
3	Samford	2	-
1	**Stanford**	**8**	-
2	Pepperdine	7	-

Super Regional
3	**Florida State**	**17**	**18**	-
Stanford	1	7	-

=== Eugene Super Regional ===
Regional	Regional
1	**Oregon**	**6**
4	Austin Peay State	5
1	**Oregon**	**7**
2	Cal State Fullerton	5
3	Indiana State	5
2	**Cal State Fullerton**	**9**
Eugene Regional – PK Park
4	**Austin Peay State**	**1**
3	Indiana State	0
4	**Austin Peay State**	**3**
2	Cal State Fullerton	0
1	**Purdue**	**7**
4	Valparaiso	2
1	Purdue	3
3	**Kent State**	**7**
3	**Kent State**	**7**^{21}
2	Kentucky	6
†Gary Regional - U.S. Steel Yard
4	Valparaiso	1
2	**Kentucky**	**8**
2	**Kentucky**	**6**
1	Purdue	3

Regional Final
1	**Oregon**	**8**	-
4	Austin Peay State	1	-
3	**Kent State**	**3**	-
2	Kentucky	2	-

Super Regional
5	Oregon	6	**3**	2
**Kent State**	**7**	2	**3**

†Purdue hosted at the U.S. Steel Yard in Gary, Indiana, due to the construction delays of the Boilermaker's new stadium, Alexander Field.

=== Waco Super Regional ===
Regional	Regional
1	Baylor	2
4	**Oral Roberts**	**4**
4	Oral Roberts	8
2	**Dallas Baptist**	**11**
3	Texas–Arlington	0
2	**Dallas Baptist**	**10**
Waco Regional – Baylor Ballpark
1	**Baylor**	**11**
3	Texas–Arlington	6
1	**Baylor**	**5**
4	Oral Roberts	2
1	**Rice**	**3**
4	Prairie View A&M	2
1	Rice	0
2	**Arkansas**	**1**
3	Sam Houston State	4
2	**Arkansas**	**5**
Houston Regional – Reckling Park
4	Prairie View A&M	2
3	**Sam Houston State**	**4**
3	**Sam Houston State**	**4**
1	Rice	1

Regional Final
2	Dallas Baptist	2	2
1	**Baylor**	**9**	**8**
2	**Arkansas**	**5**	-
3	Sam Houston State	1	-

Super Regional
4	Baylor	**8**	4	0
**Arkansas**	1	**5**	**1**

== College World Series ==
=== Participants ===
School	Conference	Record (conference)	Head coach	Previous CWS Appearances	Best CWS Finish	CWS record Not including this year
Arizona	Pac-12	43–17 (20–10)	Andy Lopez	15 (last: 2004)	1st (1976, 1980, 1986)	33–27
Arkansas	SEC	44–20 (16–14)	Dave Van Horn	6 (last: 2009)	2nd (1979)	9–12
Florida	SEC	47−18 (18−12)	Kevin O'Sullivan	7 (last: 2011)	2nd (2005, 2011)	11–15
Florida State	ACC	48–15 (24–6)	Mike Martin	20 (last: 2010)	2nd (1970, 1986, 1999)	26–40
Kent State	MAC	46–18 (24–3)	Scott Stricklin	0 (last: none)	none	0–0
South Carolina	SEC	45–17 (18–11)	Ray Tanner	10 (last: 2011)	1st (2010, 2011)	28–17
Stony Brook	America East	52–13 (21–3)	Matt Senk	0 (last: none)	none	0–0
UCLA	Pac-12	47–14 (20–10)	John Savage	3 (last: 2010)	2nd (2010)	3–7

=== Bracket ===
Seeds listed below indicate national seeds only.

First round
2	**UCLA**	**9**
Stony Brook	1
**Arizona**	**4**
3	Florida State	3
Stony Brook	2
3	**Florida State**	**12**
Kent State	1
**Arkansas**	**8**
1	Florida	3
8	**South Carolina**	**7**
**Kent State**	**5**
1	Florida	4

Second round
2	UCLA	0
**Arizona**	**4**
3	**Florida State**	**4**
2	UCLA	1
**Arkansas**	**2**
8	South Carolina	1
Kent State	1
8	**South Carolina**	**4**

Semifinals
**Arizona**	**10**	-
3	Florida State	3	-
Arkansas	0	2
8	**South Carolina**	**2**	**3**

Finals
**Arizona**	**5**	**4**	-
8	South Carolina	1	1	-

=== Championship Series ===
==== Game 1 ====
Sunday, June 24 7:00 pm Omaha, Nebraska ESPN
Team	1	2	3	4	5	6	7	8	9	R	H	E
South Carolina	0	0	0	0	0	1	0	0	0	**1**	**6**	**2**
**Arizona**	2	0	1	0	1	0	1	0	X	**5**	**12**	**1**
Starting pitchers: USC: Forrest Koumas; UA: Konner Wade; WP: Konner Wade LP: Forrest Koumas; Home runs: USC: None; UA: Rob Refsnyder; Boxscore

==== Game 2 ====
Monday, June 25 7:00 pm Omaha, Nebraska ESPN
Team	1	2	3	4	5	6	7	8	9	R	H	E
**Arizona**	0	0	1	0	0	0	0	0	3	**4**	**7**	**1**
South Carolina	0	0	0	0	0	0	1	0	0	**1**	**3**	**1**
Starting pitchers: UA: James Farris; USC: Michael Roth; WP: Matthew Troupe LP: Matthew Price; Home runs: UA: None; USC: None; Boxscore

=== All-Tournament Team ===
The following players were members of the College World Series All-Tournament Team.

Position	Player	School
P	Michael Roth	South Carolina
P	Konner Wade	Arizona
C	Riley Moore	Arizona
1B	Christian Walker	South Carolina
2B	Devon Travis	Florida State
3B	Sherman Johnson	Florida State
SS	Alex Mejia	Arizona
OF	Evan Marzilli	South Carolina
OF	Joey Rickard	Arizona
OF	**Rob Refsnyder (MOP)**	Arizona
DH	Bobby Brown	Arizona

== Final standings ==
Seeds listed below indicate national seeds only

Place	School	Record
1st	Arizona	10–0
2nd	#8 South Carolina	9–3
3rd	Arkansas	7–3
3rd	#3 Florida State	7–2
5th	Kent State	6–3
5th	#2 UCLA	6–2
7th	#1 Florida	5–2
7th	Stony Brook	6–4
9th	#4 Baylor	5–3
9th	#7 LSU	4–2
9th	NC State	4–3
9th	Oklahoma	4–3
9th	#5 Oregon	4–2
9th	Stanford	3–2
9th	St. John's	3–2
9th	Texas Christian	4–3
17th	Appalachian State	2–2
17th	Austin Peay	2–2
17th	Central Florida	2–2
17th	Clemson	2–2
17th	Creighton	2–2
17th	Dallas Baptist	2–2
17th	Georgia Tech	2–2
17th	Kentucky	2–2
17th	Louisville	2–2
17th	Mississippi	2–2
17th	#6 North Carolina	2–2
17th	Oregon State	2–2
17th	Pepperdine	2–2
17th	Samford	2–2
17th	Sam Houston State	2–2
17th	Vanderbilt	2–2
33rd	Cal State Fullerton	1–2
33rd	Coastal Carolina	1–2
33rd	College of Charleston	1–2
33rd	East Carolina	1–2
33rd	Fresno State	1–2
33rd	Louisiana Monroe	1–2
33rd	Mississippi State	1–2
33rd	Missouri	1–2
33rd	Missouri State	1–2
33rd	New Mexico	1–2
33rd	Oral Roberts	1–2
33rd	Purdue	1–2
33rd	Rice	1–2
33rd	Texas A&M	1–2
33rd	UNC Wilmington	1–2
33rd	Virginia	1–2
49th	Army	0–2
49th	Belmont	0–2
49th	Bethune-Cookman	0–2
49th	Cornell	0–2
49th	Dayton	0–2
49th	Indiana State	0–2
49th	Manhattan	0–2
49th	Miami	0–2
49th	Michigan State	0–2
49th	New Mexico State	0–2
49th	Prairie View	0–2
49th	Sacred Heart	0–2
49th	San Diego	0–2
49th	UAB	0–2
49th	UT-Arlington	0–2
49th	Valparaiso	0–2

- # denotes national seed

== Record by conference ==
Conference	# of Bids	Record	Win %	RF	SR	WS	NS	CS	NC
Pac-12	5	25–8	.758	5	4	2	1	1	1
Southeastern	8	32–18	.640	7	4	3	2	1	–
Atlantic Coast	7	18–15	.545	5	2	1	1	–	–
MAC	1	6–3	.667	1	1	1	–	–	–
America East	1	6–4	.600	1	1	1	–	–	–
Big 12	4	11–10	.524	2	2	–	–	–	–
Big East	2	5–4	.556	2	1	–	–	–	–
Mountain West	2	5–5	.500	1	1	–	–	–	–
Southern	3	5–6	.455	2	–	–	–	–	–
Conference USA	4	4–8	.333	1	–	–	–	–	–
Missouri Valley	3	3–6	.333	1	–	–	–	–	–
Southland	2	2–4	.333	1	–	–	–	–	–
West Coast	2	2–4	.333	1	–	–	–	–	–
Big Ten	2	1–4	.200	–	–	–	–	–	–
Western Athletic	2	1–4	.200	–	–	–	–	–	–
Other	16	9–32	.220	2	–	–	–	–	–

The columns RF, SR, WS, NS, CS, and NC respectively stand for the Regional Finals, Super Regionals, College World Series, National Semifinals, Championship Series, and National Champion.

== Tournament notes ==
=== Round 1 ===
- Florida's Jonathon Crawford threw a no-hitter against Bethune-Cookman, the seventh no-hitter in NCAA tournament history and the first since 1991.
- Kent State defeated Kentucky in 21 innings, the second longest game in NCAA tournament history.
- Baylor lost to Oral Roberts, the first national seed to lose their round one game since Florida State and Georgia both did so in 2008. Both Georgia and Florida State went on to make the College World Series, with Georgia losing in the championship series.

=== Round 2 ===
- Miami (FL) became the first #1 seed to go 0–2 in Regional play since San Diego in 2007.

=== Regional Finals ===
- Arizona became the first team ever to score at least 15 runs in every Regional game. They were the first team since Arkansas in 2009 to score 10 or more runs in every Regional game.
- Stony Brook became the third #4 seed ever to win a Regional, joining Missouri in 2006 and Fresno State in 2008.

=== Super Regionals ===
- Kent State, Oregon, St. John's, and Stony Brook all appeared in the Super Regionals for the first time.
- LSU lost a Super Regional in Baton Rouge for the first time (had won previous five).
- Florida State scored 35 runs in two games against Stanford, tied with LSU (2008) for the most runs in a Super Regional and the most in a 2-game Super Regional (previous record was 26).

=== College World Series ===
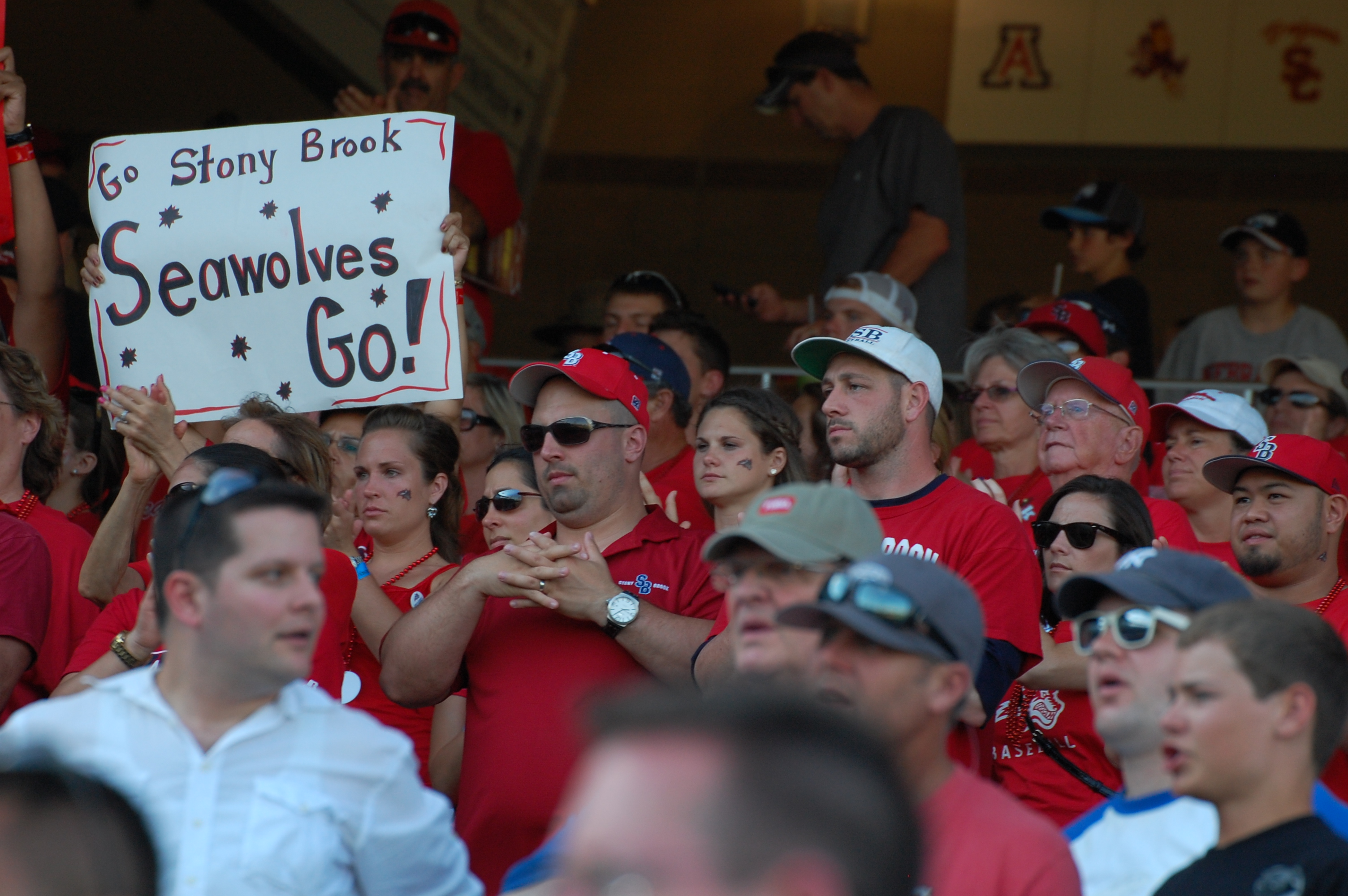
Stony Brook supporters at the College World Series

- Stony Brook was the first College World Series participant from the America East Conference and is the first from New York since St. John's in 1980.
- Kent State was the first MAC team to make the world series since 1976.
- No school from Texas made the College World Series for the first time since 2001.
- This is the 20th consecutive year that the SEC has fielded at least one team in the College World Series.
  - This is the 5th consecutive year that the SEC has fielded at least one team in the Championship Series.
- South Carolina becomes the first team since the '96, '97, '98 LSU Tigers to return to Omaha with a chance to defend their back-to-back Championships. Southern California is the only program in CWS history to win three consecutive CWS titles, or more, (1970–1974),(5).
- South Carolina entered the World Series riding two significant postseason winning streaks.
  - Longest College World Series winning streak (10 CWS games) in NCAA history.
  - Longest post-season winning streak (20 games) in NCAA history. (This streak includes, Regional, Super Regional and College World Series games, and also consists of six one run wins and four games that required extra innings.)
- Florida is making a third consecutive appearance in the College World Series for the first time in team history. Fellow 2012 CWS participants Florida State ('94,'95,'96 & '98,99,'00), Arizona ('58,'59,'60), Oregon State (05,06,07) and South Carolina ('02,'03,'04 & '10,'11,'12) have all made three consecutive appearances.
- The Game 4 match-up between No. 1 seed Florida and No. 8 seed South Carolina marks the first opening-round rematch of the previous season's Championship Game since the 1960 series when Arizona faced, and defeated, the 1959 Champions from Oklahoma State.
- This is the first appearance by Kent State or Stony Brook in the College World Series.
- Stony Brook is the second team since 1999 to be seeded fourth in a regional and advance to the College World Series (Fresno State won 2008 CWS).
- Arizona pitcher Konner Wade became the first pitcher to throw a complete-game shutout without a walk in a College World Series game since 1972.
- For the first time since the tournament expanded to 64 teams in 1999, neither team that started 2–0 in the CWS was a national seed. (Arizona and Arkansas)
- As a result of the 20 June 2012 Game 10 rain delay, South Carolina will become the first team, since Georgia did so in 1987, to play all or part of two games on the same calendar day at the CWS when they face Arkansas in the night game (Game 12) on the 21st. The last team to play two full games, in the College World Series, on the same day was Michigan on 2 June 1980.
- With the 2–0 win over Arkansas in game 12, South Carolina becomes the first team since 1952 (Holy Cross)(60 years) to win two games in the College World Series on the same day.

=== CWS records tied or broken ===
- With the Game Four win over No. 1 seed Florida, the No. 8 seed South Carolina Gamecocks extend their NCAA record-setting postseason win streak to 21 consecutive games and their College World Series record-setting consecutive win streak to 11. (Both streaks came to an end in game Eight.)
- With the 4–1 win over Kent State in game 10, South Carolina's Michael Roth becomes the College World Series' all-time leader in Most Innings Pitched, with 53 2/3rd over three years. Roth also tied the record for Most CWS Starts with his 7th, and he tied the record for most CWS Wins all-time with a 4–0 CWS record. Additionally, Roth ties the record with Most Years With Wins (3).
- Arizona becomes the first CWS team to hit two home runs in an inning at TD Ameritrade Park after Rob Refsnyder and Bobby Brown hit home runs in the fourth inning of Game 11 against Florida State. In the same game, Florida State uses eight different pitchers, tying a CWS record.
- With the 3–2 win over Arkansas in game 13, South Carolina's Matt Price sets a new College World Series Most Wins record with 5.
- Arizona becomes only the second team after South Carolina the previous year to go a perfect 10–0 in the postseason.

== Media coverage ==
=== Radio ===
NRG Media, in conjunction with the Dial Global Sports/NCAA Radio Network provided nationwide radio coverage of the College World Series. Kevin Kugler and John Bishop called all games leading up to the Championship Series. It would be the first time John Bishop would call College World Series games for Dial Global Sports. The championship series would be called by Kugler and Scott Graham.

=== Selection shows ===
The NCAA Division I Road to Omaha Selection Show aired on ESPN on May 28, 2012.

=== Competition ===
- Regionals:

The Columbia and Tucson Regionals were broadcast on ESPNU and ESPN3.
The College Station, Gainesville, Palo Alto and Tallahassee Regionals were broadcast on ESPN3.
The Baton Rouge Regional was broadcast on Comcast SportsNet Northwest, Cox Sports Television, CSS.
Purdue's games at the Gary Regional were broadcast on Big Ten Network. Games in that regional not involving Purdue were not televised at all.
All games during the Super Regionals and the College World Series aired on the ESPN Networks (ESPN, ESPN2, ESPNU, and ESPN3).

==== Broadcast assignments ====
Super Regionals

- Steve Berthiaume & Doug Glanville - Baton Rouge, Louisiana
- Justin Kutcher & Jay Payton - Gainesville, Florida
- Carter Blackburn, Randy Flores & Mike Rooney - Tucson, Arizona
- Dave Neal & Jay Walker - Waco, Texas

College World Series

- Karl Ravech or Jon Sciambi or Mike Patrick, Kyle Peterson, & Jenn Brown - Afternoons
- Mike Patrick, Nomar Garciaparra or Orel Hershiser, & Jessica Mendoza - Evenings

Super Regionals

- Mike Patrick, Nomar Garciaparra, & Jessica Mendoza - Tallahassee, Florida
- Mark Neely & Danny Kanell - Columbia, South Carolina
- Clay Matvick, Kyle Peterson, & Jenn Brown - Los Angeles, California
- Adam Amin & Paul Lo Duca - Eugene, Oregon

College World Series Championship

- Mike Patrick, Orel Hershiser, Kyle Peterson, Jenn Brown, & Jessica Mendoza

== See also ==
- 2012 NCAA Division II baseball tournament
- 2012 NCAA Division III baseball tournament
- 2012 NAIA World Series
