= Johnny Field =

American baseball player (born 1992)

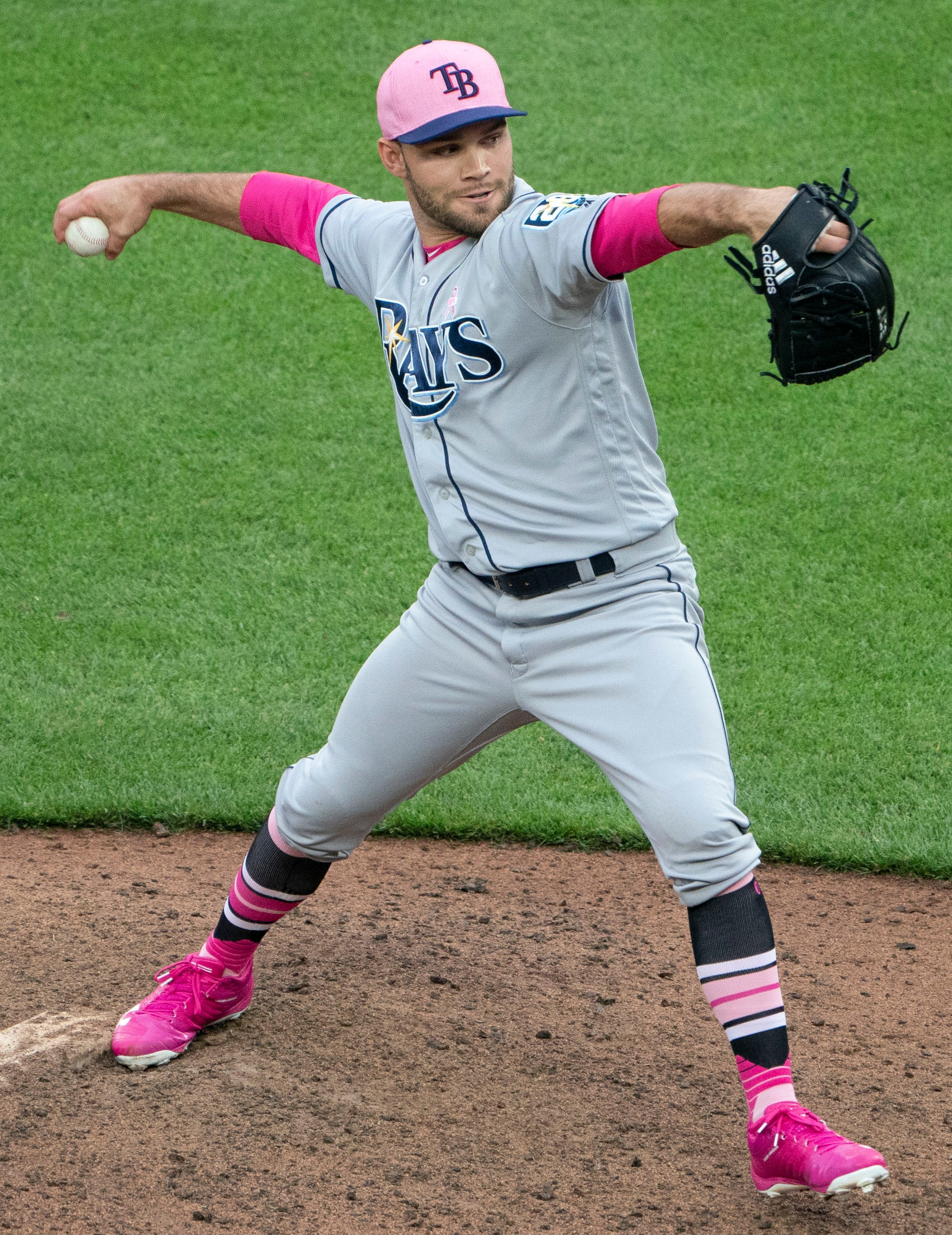
- Field pitching for the Tampa Bay Rays in 2018
- Outfielder
- Born: February 20, 1992 (age 34); Las Vegas, Nevada, U.S.
- Batted: Right Threw: Right

MLB debut
- April 14, 2018, for the Tampa Bay Rays

Last MLB appearance
- September 29, 2018, for the Minnesota Twins

MLB statistics
- Batting average: .222
- Home runs: 9
- Runs batted in: 21
- Stats at Baseball Reference

Teams
- Tampa Bay Rays (2018); Minnesota Twins (2018)
Medals
Men's baseball
Representing the United States
Haarlem Baseball Week
Bronze medal – third place	2012	Team

John David Field (born February 20, 1992) is an American former professional baseball outfielder. He played one season in Major League Baseball (MLB) for the Tampa Bay Rays and Minnesota Twins in 2018.

== Amateur career ==
Field attended Bishop Gorman High School in Las Vegas, Nevada. He attended the University of Arizona and played college baseball for the Arizona Wildcats from 2011 to 2013. Over 172 games, he batted .343 with a .431 on-base percentage, a .518 slugging percentage, and 11 home runs. In 2011, he played collegiate summer baseball with the Wareham Gatemen of the Cape Cod Baseball League. He was a member of Arizona's College World Series championship team in 2012.

== Professional career ==
=== Tampa Bay Rays ===
The Tampa Bay Rays selected Field in the fifth round of the 2013 Major League Baseball draft. He signed with the Rays and made his professional debut with the Hudson Valley Renegades and spent the whole season there, batting .252 with two home runs and 24 RBI in 60 games. In 2014, he played for the Bowling Green Hot Rods and Charlotte Stone Crabs, slashing .300/.376/.488 with 12 home runs, 58 RBI, and 23 stolen bases in 122 total games between the two teams, and was named the Rays Minor League Player of the Year. Field played for the Montgomery Biscuits in 2015, batting .255 with 14 home runs and 66 RBI in 116 games, and for the Biscuits and Durham Bulls in 2016, compiling a .273 batting average with 12 home runs and 56 RBI in 114 games. Field spent 2017 with Durham where he hit .261/.303/.425 with 12 home runs and 57 RBIs in 111 games.

The Rays promoted Field to the major leagues on April 12, 2018. He had his first hit, a double, against Yacksel Ríos of the Philadelphia Phillies. Field was optioned to the Triple-A Durham Bulls on July 10. Field was designated for assignment by the Rays on July 20. In 62 games with Tampa Bay, he hit .213 with six home runs, 14 RBI, and four stolen bases

=== Cleveland Indians ===
The Cleveland Indians claimed Field off waivers from the Rays on July 24, 2018. Field was designated for assignment by the Indians on July 31, 2018.

=== Minnesota Twins ===
The Minnesota Twins claimed Field off waivers from the Indians on August 3, 2018.

=== Chicago Cubs ===
On November 1, 2018, Field was claimed off waivers by the Chicago Cubs. He was removed from the 40–man roster and sent outright to the Triple–A Iowa Cubs on November 20. He was invited to spring training for 2019, but did not make the team and was assigned to Iowa. In 84 games, Field slashed .234/.287/.421 with eight home runs, 41 RBI, and seven stolen bases. He elected free agency following the season on November 4, 2019.

=== Kansas City Monarchs ===
On March 12, 2021, Field signed with the Kansas City Monarchs of the American Association of Professional Baseball. Field was released by the team on June 28 after hitting .198/.278/.342 with 3 home runs in 31 games for the team.

=== High Point Rockers ===
On June 30, 2021, Field signed with the High Point Rockers of the Atlantic League of Professional Baseball. He became a free agent following the season. On April 7, 2022, Field re-signed with the Rockers for the 2022 season. Field appeared in 60 games for the Rockers in 2022, slashing .229/.332/.375 with 6 home runs, 25 RBI, and 10 stolen bases. He retired from professional baseball on July 4.

== Personal life ==
Field and college teammate Rob Refsnyder are friends. Field was a groomsman at Refsnyder's wedding.
