= Konner Wade =

American baseball player (born 1991)

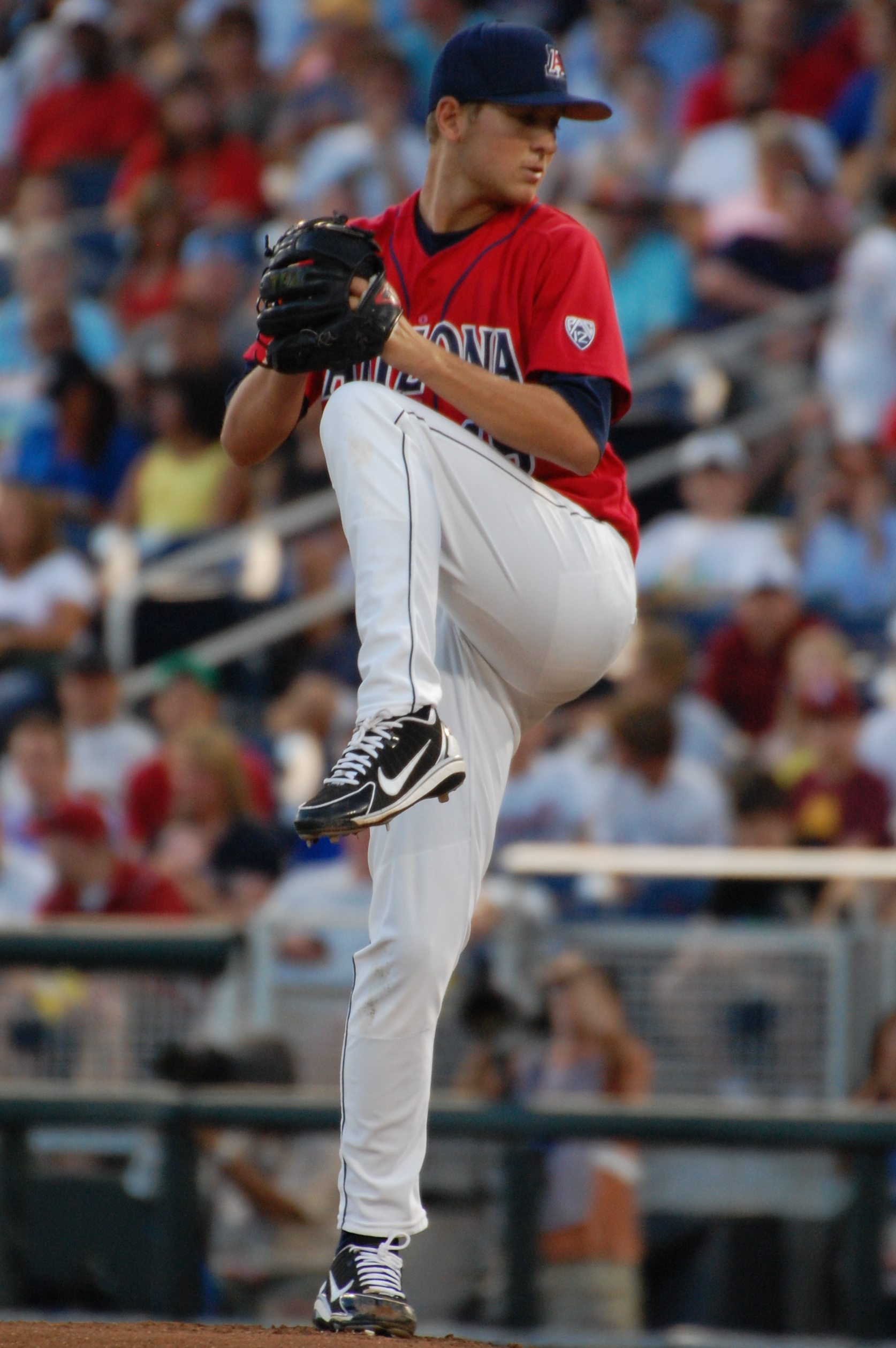
- Wade pitching for Arizona at the 2012 College World Series
- Pitcher
- Born: December 3, 1991 (age 34); Scottsdale, Arizona, U.S.
- Batted: Left Threw: Right

MLB debut
- June 26, 2021, for the Baltimore Orioles

Last MLB appearance
- October 2, 2021, for the Baltimore Orioles

MLB statistics
- Win–loss record: 0–0
- Earned run average: 11.68
- Strikeouts: 11
- Stats at Baseball Reference

Teams
- Baltimore Orioles (2021)

Konner James Wade (born December 3, 1991) is an American former professional baseball pitcher. He played in Major League Baseball (MLB) for the Baltimore Orioles. He was drafted by the Colorado Rockies in the 7th round of the 2013 Major League Baseball draft.

== Amateur career ==
A native of Scottsdale, Arizona, Wade attended Chaparral High School. He was selected in the 35th round of the 2010 MLB draft by the Arizona Diamondbacks, but opted to play college baseball at the University of Arizona rather than turn professional. In 2011, he played collegiate summer baseball with the Wareham Gatemen of the Cape Cod Baseball League (CCBL), and was named West Division MVP of the annual CCBL All-Star Game at Fenway Park. The following season, Wade was part of Arizona's 2012 College World Series championship club, and returned to play for the CCBL's Gatemen for a second summer. He was selected by the Colorado Rockies in the 7th round of the 2013 Major League Baseball draft.

== Professional career ==
=== Colorado Rockies ===
Wade made his professional debut with the Low-A Tri-City Dust Devils in 2013, pitching to a 3–7 record and a 3.58 earned run average in 14 games, all starts. He moved up a level to the Single-A Asheville Tourists for the 2014 season, recording an 8–8 record with a 3.61 earned run average in 27 games, 25 of them being starts. For the High-A Modesto Nuts in 2015, Wade accumulated an 8–9 record and a 3.96 earned run average in a team–leading 168 1/3 innings. He reached the Double–A Hartford Yard Goats in 2016 and while mostly working as a reliever for the first time in his career, he threw to a 1–4 record with a 5.17 earned run average in 47 appearances. In 33 games with Hartford in 2017, he posted a 9–7 record and a 4.28 earned run average.

=== Baltimore Orioles ===
On November 22, 2017, Wade was traded to the Baltimore Orioles organization in exchange for international slot money. On March 27, 2018, Wade was released by Baltimore without playing in a game for the organization.

=== Sugar Land Skeeters ===
Before the 2018 season, Wade signed with the Sugar Land Skeeters of the Atlantic League of Professional Baseball. He spent the entire 2018 season with the Skeeters, pitching in 27 games and recording an 8–6 record with a 3.10 earned run average (ERA) while being selected for the 2018 Atlantic League All–Game. On March 29, 2019, Wade re–signed with the Skeeters. Wade pitched in 5 games for the Skeeters in 2019, accumulating a 3.38 ERA.

=== Boston Red Sox ===
On May 24, 2019, the Boston Red Sox organization purchased Wade's contract and assigned him to the Double–A Portland Sea Dogs. He stayed with the Red Sox organization for the rest of the 2019 season, pitching in 18 games and posting a 2.69 ERA between Portland and the Triple-A Pawtucket Red Sox. Wade did not play in a game in 2020 due to the cancellation of the minor league season because of the COVID-19 pandemic. On November 2, 2020, Wade elected free agency.

=== Baltimore Orioles (second stint) ===
On February 3, 2021, Wade signed a minor league contract with the Baltimore Orioles organization, rejoining the club he had been with for four months in the 2017–18 offseason. On June 25, 2021, Wade's contract was purchased and he was promoted to the major leagues for the first time after he recorded a 3.48 earned run average for the Triple–A Norfolk Tides. He made his MLB debut the following day, and pitched 1.2 innings of relief against the Toronto Blue Jays, but allowed 6 earned runs on 7 hits. Wade was optioned back to Norfolk following the game. Wade was designated for assignment on July 3 following the waiver claim of Shaun Anderson. He was outrighted to Norfolk on July 5. On August 15, Wade's contract was selected by the Orioles. On October 25, Wade elected free agency.

=== Seattle Mariners ===
On April 30, 2022, Wade signed a minor league contract with the Seattle Mariners. Wade pitched in 24 games (starting 23) for the Triple-A Tacoma Rainiers, registering a 5–7 record and 5.45 ERA with 78 strikeouts in 115 2/3 innings of work. He elected free agency following the season on November 10.

On April 18, 2023, Wade re-signed with the Mariners organization on a new minor league contract. In 11 starts for Tacoma, he struggled to an 8.57 ERA with 32 strikeouts in 48 1/3 innings pitched. On July 26, Wade was released by Seattle.
