= James Farris =

American baseball player (1992–2025)

- Pitcher
- Born: April 4, 1992; Gilbert, Arizona, U.S.
- Died: August 17, 2025 (aged 33); Jonesboro, Arkansas, U.S.
- Batted: Right Threw: Right
- Stats at Baseball Reference

James Robert Farris (April 4, 1992 – August 17, 2025) was an American professional baseball pitcher.

== Career ==
Farris attended Highland High School in Gilbert, Arizona, and the University of Arizona, where he played college baseball for the Arizona Wildcats. He pitched for the Wildcats in the 2012 College World Series. In 2012, he played collegiate summer baseball with the Orleans Firebirds of the Cape Cod Baseball League.

=== Chicago Cubs ===
The Chicago Cubs selected Farris in the ninth round of the 2014 MLB draft. After signing, he made his professional debut with the Boise Hawks, posting a 2.57 ERA in 14 innings pitched. He spent 2015 with the South Bend Cubs and Myrtle Beach Pelicans, compiling a combined 2–8 record and 3.47 ERA in 38 relief appearances, and 2016 with Myrtle Beach and the Tennessee Smokies, pitching to a combined 2–5 record and 2.59 ERA in 43 total games. After the season, he pitched for the Mesa Solar Sox of the Arizona Fall League.

=== Colorado Rockies ===
On February 1, 2017, the Cubs traded Farris to the Colorado Rockies in exchange for Eddie Butler. He spent the season with both the Hartford Yard Goats and the Albuquerque Isotopes, collecting a 1–3 record and 3.59 ERA with 69 strikeouts in 57 2/3 innings.

== Death ==
Farris died from liver cancer in Jonesboro, Arkansas, on August 17, 2025, at the age of 33.
