= 2024 Maryland Eastern Shore Hawks baseball team =

American college baseball season

2024 Maryland Eastern Shore Hawks baseball
- Conference: Northeast Conference
- Record: 0–48 (0–30 NEC)
- Head coach: Danny Acosta (1st season)
- Assistant coaches: Cole Doherty; Kyle Houts
- Home stadium: Henry S. Parker Athletic Complex

2024 Northeast Conference baseball standings
	Conf.						Overall
Team	W		L		T	PCT	W		L		T	PCT
Sacred Heart ‍†‍‍	25	–	8	–	0	.758	35	–	23	–	0	.603
LIU ‍‍‡‍^{y}	24	–	9	–	0	.727	33	–	23	–	0	.589
Merrimack ‍‍‍	22	–	11	–	0	.667	33	–	26	–	0	.559
Wagner ‍‍‍	21	–	12	–	0	.636	26	–	30	–	0	.464
Delaware State ‍‍‍	20	–	13	–	0	.606	22	–	27	–	0	.449
Fairleigh Dickinson ‍‍‍	18	–	14	–	0	.563	26	–	30	–	0	.464
Central Connecticut ‍‍‍	17	–	15	–	0	.531	18	–	24	–	0	.429
Le Moyne ‍‍‍	15	–	17	–	0	.469	22	–	27	–	1	.450
Stonehill ‍‍‍	13	–	17	–	0	.433	18	–	29	–	0	.383
Coppin State ‍‍‍	11	–	21	–	0	.344	12	–	33	–	0	.267
Norfolk State ‍‍‍	7	–	26	–	0	.212	12	–	41	–	0	.226
Maryland Eastern Shore ‍‍‍	0	–	30	–	0	.000	0	–	48	–	0	.000
† – Conference champion ‡ – Tournament champion y – Invited to the NCAA Tournament; As of May 26, 2024; Rankings from D1Baseball

The 2024 Maryland Eastern Shore Hawks baseball team represented the University of Maryland Eastern Shore during the 2024 NCAA Division I baseball season in the Northeastern Conference under first year head coach Danny Acosta. The Hawks played their home games at the Henry S. Parker Athletic Complex, as their usual homefield at Hawk Stadium was undergoing lengthy renovations.

The Hawks failed to make the 2024 Northeastern Conference Tournament, placing last in the conference with a record of 0 wins and 48 losses. This also was the first time in NCAA Division 1 history that a team finished a full season winless.

The 2024 season was the first season following the departure of Head Coach Brian Hollamon, who left the club in 2023. As a result of Hollamon's departure, the University hired Danny Acosta, who had spent the previous 4 seasons with Iowa Lakes Community College as their head coach. Acosta posted a 4-44 record with Iowa Lakes during the 2023 season.

== Personnel ==
=== Roster ===
2024 Maryland Eastern Shore Hawks baseball roster
Pitchers: 15 – Raymond Smith – Sophomore; 17 – Joe Kelly – Sophomore; 18 – Cade Williams – Freshman; 20 – Eric Elliott – Junior; 21 – Gary Hallmen Jr. – Junior; 26 – Charles Bernard – (redshirt) Sophomore; 27 – Lee Byrd – Junior; 31 – Tyler Prather – (redshirt) Sophomore; 35 – Justin Praddy – Freshman; 36 – Brandon Gomez – Junior; 37 – Justin Spencer – Freshman; 40 – Brandon Poole – Freshman	Catchers: 14 – Ryan Howe – (redshirt) Sophomore; 25 – Doyle McNew – Junior; First basemen: 29 – Kenneth Gaskins – (redshirt) Freshman; 39 – Brian Jones – Freshman; 42 – Derek Blackmore – Junior; Infielders: 2 – Anders Brown – Fifth year; 3 – Riley Horner – Senior; 5 – Carter Rieben – Junior; 6 – Ryan Davis – Junior; 9 – Ulysses Luciano – Fifth year; 11 – Aidan Cunningham – (redshirt) Sophomore; 13 – Michael Blackiston – Junior; 38 – Quentin Smith – Freshman	Outfielders: 1 – Derrick Mayes II – Fifth year; 4 – Danny Sadler Jr. – Junior; 8 – Zach Garcia – Junior; 10 – Jason Brown – Senior; 16 – Jordan Peart – Junior; 22 – Joe Wright Jr. – (redshirt) Sophomore; 34 – Isaiah Beseris – (redshirt) Freshman; Utility: 23 – Bronson Taylor – Freshman

=== Coaching staff ===
2024 Maryland Eastern Shore Hawks coaching staff
Name	Position	Seasons at Maryland Eastern Shore
Danny Acosta	Head Coach	1
Cole Doherty	Pitching Coach & Recruiting Coordinator	1
Kyle Houts	Hitting & Infield Coach	1

== Schedule and results ==
2024 Maryland Eastern Shore Hawks baseball game log (0–48)
Regular season (0–48)

February (0–6)
Date	Opponent	Rank	Site/stadium	Score	Win	Loss	Save	TV	Attendance	Overall record	NEC record
February 16	at North Carolina A&T*		War Memorial Stadium; Greensboro, North Carolina	**L** 2–5	Jake Delisi (1–0)	Cade Williams (0–1)	–		159	0–1	—
February 17	at North Carolina A&T*		War Memorial Stadium	**L** 2–12	Diego Barrett (1–0)	Justin Spencer (0–1)	Brock Duff (1)		157	0–2	—
February 18	at North Carolina A&T*		War Memorial Stadium	**L** 1–5	Evan Hart (1–0)	Tyler Prather (0–1)	Angel Ortiz (1)		159	0–3	—
February 23	at Austin Peay*		Raymond C. Hand Park; Clarksville, Tennessee	**L** 5–15^{8}	Jacob Weaver (1–0)	Joe Kelly (0–1)	—		208	0–4	—
February 24	at Austin Peay*		Raymond C. Hand Park	**L** 0–10^{7}	Andrew Devine (2–0)	Tyler Prather (0–2)	–		342	0–5	—
February 25	at Austin Peay*		Raymond C. Hand Park	**L** 3–14^{8}	Campbell Holt (1–0)	Charles Bernard (0–1)	—		537	0–6	—

March (0–16)
Date	Opponent	Rank	Site/stadium	Score	Win	Loss	Save	TV	Attendance	Overall record	NEC record
March 2 (Note: Game 1 of doubleheader.)	at Alabama State*		Wheeler–Watkins Baseball Complex; Montgomery, Alabama	**L** 5–17^{8}	Jose Almazan (2–1)	Joe Kelly (0–2)	–		455	0–7	—
March 2 (Note: Game 2 of doubleheader.)	at Alabama State*		Wheeler–Watkins Baseball Complex	**L** 5–7	Jorhan Laboy (1–1)	Justin Spencer (0–2)	Luis Rodriguez (2)		476	0–8	—
March 3	at Alabama State*		Wheeler–Watkins Baseball Complex	**L** 1–11^{7}	Devin Brooks (3–2)	Charles Bernard (0–2)	—		289	0–9	—
March 5	at George Washington*		Barcroft Park; Arlington, Virginia	**L** 5–9	Tyler Blankenship (1–0)	Cade Williams (0–2)	Benny Wilson (2)		62	0–10	—
March 13	at George Mason*		Spuhler Field; Fairfax, Virginia	**L** 5–15^{7}	Toby Hueber (1–0)	Lee Byrd (0–1)	–		87	0–11	—
March 15	vs. Norfolk State		Henry S. Parker Athletic Complex; Salisbury, Maryland	**L** 2–11	Dalton Barham (3–2)	Eric Elliott (0–1)	–		41	0–12	0—1
March 16	vs. Norfolk State		Henry S. Parker Athletic Complex	**L** 2–4^{11}	Nolan Manzer (2–0)	Joe Kelly (0–3)	–		122	0–13	0—2
March 17	vs. Norfolk State		Henry S. Parker Athletic Complex	**L** 4–9	Joe Lafave (2–3)	Cade Williams (0–3)	Parker Hampton (1)		83	0–14	0—3
March 19	vs. UMBC*		Henry S. Parker Athletic Complex	**L** 0–10^{7}	Logan Wiley (2–1)	Justin Spencer (0–3)	–		83	0–15	0—3
March 20	vs. UMass*		Henry S. Parker Athletic Complex	**L** 5–12	Justin Masteralexis (2–0)	Raymond Smith (0–1)	–		-	0–16	0—3
March 22	at Merrimack		Alumni Field; Andover, Massachusetts	**L** 1–20	Andrew Heffernan (1–0)	Joe Kelly (0–4)	–		66	0–17	0—4
March 22	at Merrimack		Alumni Field	**L** 3–11	Tyghe Healy (1–2)	Cade Williams (0–4)	–		120	0–18	0—5
March 24	at Merrimack		Alumni Field	**L** 1–9	Brayden Ryan (2–1)	Brandon Poole (0–1)	–		87	0–19	0—6
March 27	at Navy*		Max Bishop Stadium; Annapolis, Maryland	**Postponed (inclement weather). Make-up date April 10.**							
March 29	at Fairleigh Dickinson		Naimoli Family Baseball Complex; Teaneck, New Jersey	**L** 8–12	Patrick Gardner (2–1)	Charles Bernard (0–3)	–		143	0–20	0—7
March 29	at Fairleigh Dickinson		Naimoli Family Baseball Complex	**L** 8–28	Joey Kosowsky (2–5)	Gary Hallmen Jr. (0–1)	–		177	0–21	0—8
March 30	at Fairleigh Dickinson		Naimoli Family Baseball Complex	**L** 8–9	Ian Barrett (2–0)	Brandon Gomez (0–1)	–		184	0–22	0—9

April (0–16)
Date	Opponent	Rank	Site/stadium	Score	Win	Loss	Save	TV	Attendance	Overall record	NEC record
April 5	at LIU		LIU Baseball Stadium; Brookville, New York	**L** 5–8	PJ Moritz (1–1)	Gary Hallmen Jr. (0–2)	Jack Vandoran (5)	NEC Front Row	102	0–23	0—10
April 6	at LIU		LIU Baseball Stadium	**L** 4–7	PJ Moritz (2–1)	Brandon Poole (0–2)	Jack Vandoran (6)	NEC Front Row	106	0–24	0—11
April 7	at LIU		LIU Baseball Stadium	**L** 4–16	Evan Panjwani (3–0)	Brandon Poole (0–3)	–	NEC Front Row	105	0–25	0—12
April 10	at Navy*; Rescheduled from March 27		Max Bishop Stadium	**L** 10–13	Evan Foster (1–0)	Raymond Smith (0–2)	Brock Murtha (2)	ESPN+	472	0–26	0–12
April 12	at Central Connecticut		CCSU Baseball Field; New Britain, Connecticut	**L** 2–7	Jake Neuman (3–4)	Cade Williams (0–5)	–		89	0–27	0–13
April 13	at Central Connecticut		CCSU Baseball Field	**L** 4–13	Sam Hutchinson (1–0)	Tyler Prather (0–3)	–		97	0–28	0–14
April 14	at Central Connecticut		CCSU Baseball Field	**L** 7–10	Patrick Reilly (1–0)	Charles Bernard (0–4)	Sam Hutchinson (2)		138	0–29	0–15
April 17	vs. George Washington*		Henry S. Parker Athletic Complex	**L** 3–13^{7}	Brandon Siegenthaler (2–2)	Brandon Gomez (0–2)	–		30	0–30	0–15
April 19	at Coppin State		Joe Cannon Stadium; Hanover, Maryland	**L** 7–8	Clay Thompson (1–1)	Gary Hallmen Jr. (0–3)	–		100	0–31	0–16
April 20	at Coppin State		Joe Cannon Stadium	**L** 6–14	Alek Elges (2–3)	Brandon Poole (0–4)	–		30	0–32	0–17
April 21	at Coppin State		Joe Cannon Stadium	**L** 1–7	Kaden Straily (2–3)	Charles Bernard (0–5)	Liam McCallum (2)		33	0–33	0–18
April 24	vs. Mount St. Mary's*; Rescheduled from March 17		Henry S. Parker Athletic Complex	**L** 1–19	TJ Curley (1–0)	Cade Williams (0–6)	–		23	0–34	0–18
April 24	vs. Mount St. Mary's*; Rescheduled from March 17		Henry S. Parker Athletic Complex	**L** 5–9	JB Manarchuck (1–1)	Raymond Smith (0–3)	–		23	0–35	0–18
April 26	vs. Wagner		Henry S. Parker Athletic Complex	**L** 8–23	Frankie Wright (6–4)	Eric Elliott (0–2)	–		18	0–36	0–19
April 27	vs. Wagner		Henry S. Parker Athletic Complex	**L** 0–6	Connor Hayden (6–3)	Brandon Poole (0–5)	–		18	0–37	0–20
April 28	vs. Wagner		Henry S. Parker Athletic Complex	**L** 4–13	Ryan Bilka (2–1)	Joe Kelly (0–4)	–		18	0–38	0–21

May (0–10)
Date	Opponent	Rank	Site/stadium	Score	Win	Loss	Save	TV	Attendance	Overall record	NEC record
May 3	at Le Moyne		Dick Rockwell Field; Syracuse, New York	**L** 4–8	Jacob Crystal (2–7)	Raymond Smith (0–4)	–		221	0–39	0–22
May 3	at Le Moyne		Dick Rockwell Field	**L** 8–20	Max Parker (3–3)	Cade Williams (0–7)	–		205	0–40	0–23
May 4	at Le Moyne		Dick Rockwell Field	**L** 9–10	Jordan Goldman (5–4)	Gary Hallmen Jr. (0–4)	–		178	0–41	0–24
May 7	at George Mason*		Spuhler Field	**L** 3–9	Connor Knox (1–1)	Tyler Prather (0–4)	–		85	0–42	0–24
May 10	at Delaware State		Bob Reed Field; Dover, Delaware	**L** 2–10	Jack Messmore (0–0)	Cade Williams (0–0)	–		150	0–43	0–25
May 11	at Delaware State		Bob Reed Field	**L** 8–12	Kieran Etwaru (0–0)	Raymond Smith (0–0)	–		250	0–44	0–26
May 11	at Delaware State		Bob Reed Field	**L** 12–21	Ricardo Gonzalez (0–0)	Brandon Gomez (0–0)	–		175	0–45	0–27
May 14	at UMBC		The Baseball Factory Field at UMBC; Catonsville, Maryland	**Canceled.**							
May 16	vs. Sacred Heart		Henry S. Parker Athletic Complex	**L** 0–18	Jake Babuschak (8–3)	Eric Elliott (0–3)	–		29	0–46	0–28
May 17	vs. Sacred Heart		Henry S. Parker Athletic Complex	**L** 4–8	Elijah Foster (5–1)	Brandon Gomez (0–4)	Jake McDowell (4)		31	0–47	0–29
May 17	vs. Sacred Heart		Henry S. Parker Athletic Complex	**L** 5–10	Joe Trombley (3–2)	Cade Williams (0–9)	Owen MacDonnell (7)		49	0–48	0–30

Legend: = Win = Loss = Canceled
Bold = Maryland Eastern Shore team member * = Non-conference game
Rankings are based on the team's current ranking in the D1Baseball poll.
Schedule source

Schedule Notes
