= Brian Hollamon =

American college baseball coach

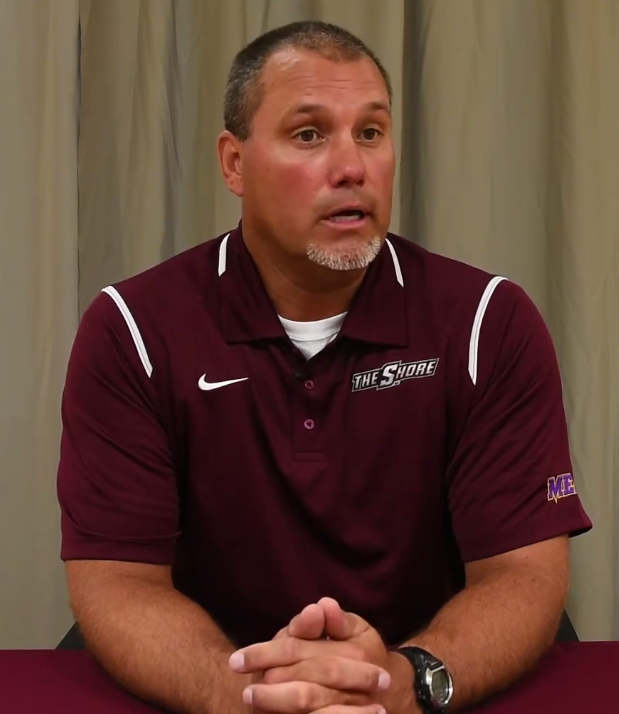
- Hollamon with Maryland Eastern Shore in 2018

Playing career
- 1992–1995: Salisbury
- Position: Shortstop

Coaching career (HC unless noted)
- 1996–1999: Maryland Eastern Shore (GA)
- 2000–2003: Mardela Springs (MD) Mardela HS
- 2004–2017: Salisbury (MD) Parkside HS
- 2018–2023: Maryland Eastern Shore

Head coaching record
- Overall: 61–169
- Tournaments: MEAC: 1–4; NE: 0–2; NCAA: 0–0

Brian Hollamon is an American college baseball coach and former shortstop. He was the head baseball coach of the Maryland Eastern Shore Hawks.

== Playing career ==
Hollamon attended Sussex Central High School in Georgetown, Delaware. Hollamon then enrolled at Salisbury University, to play college baseball for the Salisbury Sea Gulls baseball team. As a sophomore in 1993, Hollamon was named the Sea Gulls team MVP at the conclusion of the season.

== Coaching career ==
Hollamon became a graduate assistant at the University of Maryland Eastern Shore in the fall of 1995. Hollamon stayed on board with the Hawks through the 1999 season. Hollamon was named the head coach of Mardela High School in Mardela Springs, Maryland in 1999. In 2003, Hollamon left Mardela to take the head coaching position at Parkside High School in Salisbury, Maryland. Hollamon spent 14 seasons as the head coach of Parkside, helping several players earn NCAA Division I scholarships.

On August 21, 2017, Hollamon was named the head coach at Maryland Eastern Shore.

== Head coaching record ==
Record table
Season	Team	Overall	Conference	Standing	Postseason
Maryland Eastern Shore Hawks (Mid-Eastern Athletic Conference) (2018–2022)
2018	Maryland Eastern Shore	12–41	7–16	3rd (Northern)	MEAC Tournament
2019	Maryland Eastern Shore	10–43	4–20	4th (Northern)	
2020	Maryland Eastern Shore	4–11	0–0		Season canceled due to COVID-19
2021	Maryland Eastern Shore	0–0	0–0		Season canceled due to COVID-19
2022	Maryland Eastern Shore	17–37	15–18	3rd	MEAC Tournament
Maryland Eastern Shore:			26–64		
Maryland Eastern Shore Hawks (Northeast Conference) (2023)
2023	Maryland Eastern Shore	18–37	14–16	T-6th	Northeast Tournament
Maryland Eastern Shore:		61–169	14–16		
Total:		61–169			
National champion Postseason invitational champion Conference regular season champion Conference regular season and conference tournament champion Division regular season champion Division regular season and conference tournament champion Conference tournament champion

== See also ==
- List of current NCAA Division I baseball coaches
