= James M. Bennett High School =

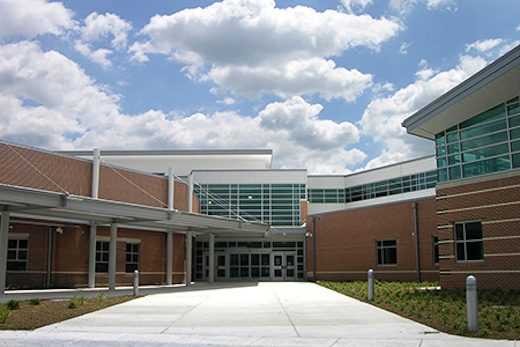

Location
- 300 East College Avenue; Salisbury, Wicomico, Maryland 21804; United States; 38°20′43″N 75°35′26″W

Information
- School type: Public High School
- Opened: 1962
- School district: Wicomico County Public Schools
- Principal: Christel Savage
- Teaching staff: 97
- Grades: 9–12
- Enrollment: 1567 (2019–20)
- Student to teacher ratio: 16.15
- Colors: Red and Black
- Nickname: Clippers
- Newspaper: The Kelp
- Yearbook: The Voyager
- Website: jmb.wicomicoschools.org

James M. Bennett High School is a high school located in Salisbury, Wicomico County, Maryland, United States. It is part of the Wicomico County Public School system. It is one of four public high schools in Wicomico County along with Mardela Middle and High School, Parkside High School, and Wicomico High School. It was established in 1962.

The school is named after James M. Bennett, a former Superintendent of Wicomico County Schools.

== Facilities ==
Construction on the current James M. Bennett High School began in 2008, was completed 2010, and opened for the 2010-2011 school year. It was built behind to the former one which was demolished in the summer of 2010. The school was rededicated on April 18, 2011, marking Salisbury's first new high school in more than 30 years.

The current school maintains the Bennett Memorial Garden, a garden designed and built in 2000, to honor three Class of 2000 students who died before graduating, Lori Sterling, Adam Travatello, and Jessica Smith. The garden was dedicated on August 19, 2000 with participation from Frank Perdue, then Salisbury Mayor Barrie Tilghman, and Jacob Day, who designed the Garden. After construction, an endowed maintenance fund was established at the Community Foundation of the Eastern Shore. Since the garden was installed, other past students have been memorialized, such as Sgt. Maj. Wardell Turner, who was killed in Afghanistan in 2014.

== Sports ==
Athletic programs offered at the school include the following:

- Fall: cheerleading, cross country, field hockey, football, golf, boys soccer, girls soccer, tennis, and volleyball.
- Winter: basketball, basketball, cheerleading, indoor track & field, strength & conditioning, and wrestling.
- Spring: baseball, lacrosse, softball, outdoor track & field, bocce, and tennis.

== See also ==
- List of high schools in Maryland
