= Wicomico High School =

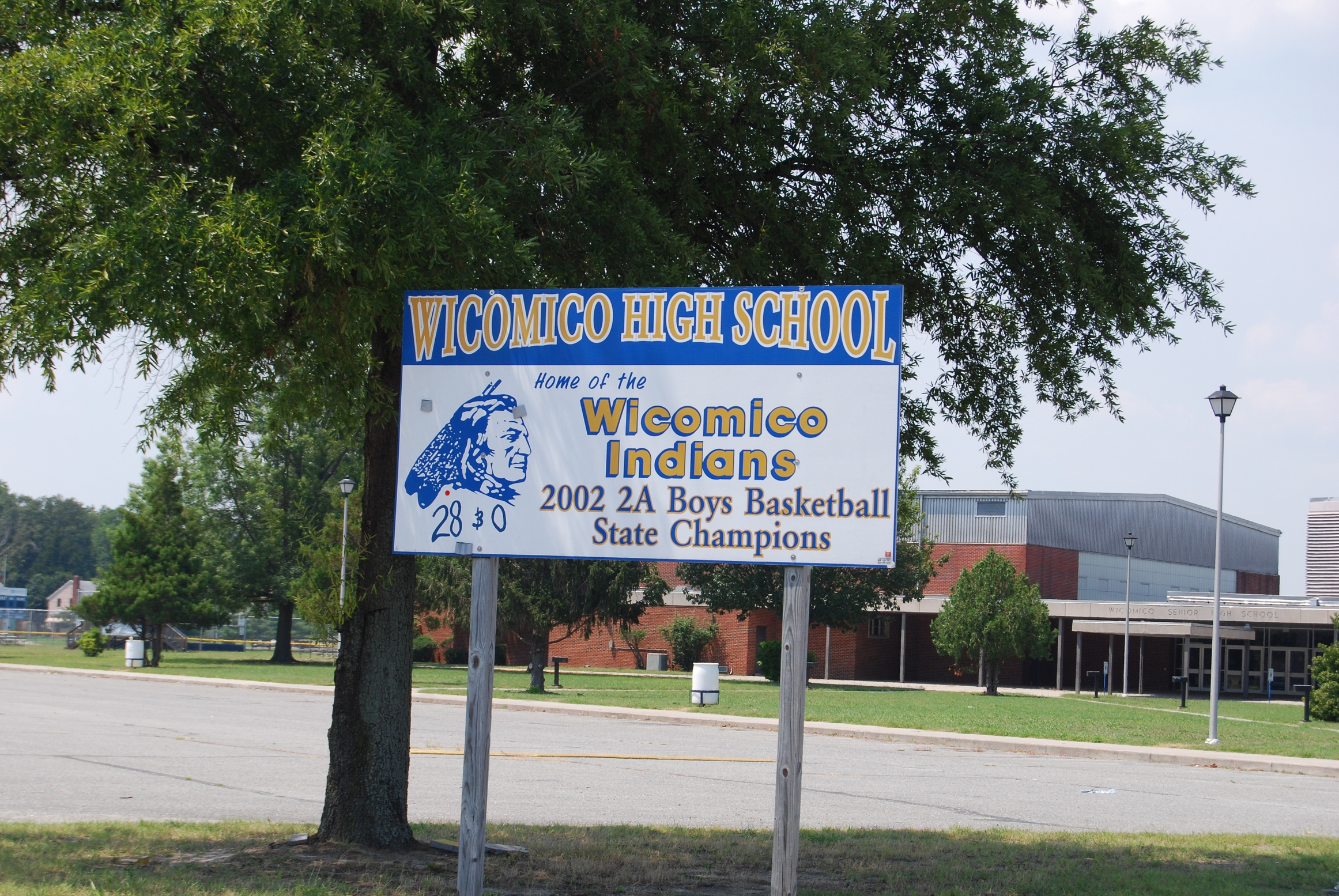

Location
- 201 Long Avenue; Salisbury, Maryland 21804; United States; 38°21′52.5″N 75°34′46″W

Information
- Type: Public Secondary
- Established: 1905
- NCES District ID: 2400690
- NCES School ID: 240069001320
- Principal: Nikki Blake
- Faculty: 179
- Grades: 9-12
- Enrollment: 1276
- Colors: Blue and Gold
- Mascot: Indian
- Yearbook: Tom-Tom
- Website: wihi.wicomicoschools.org

Wicomico High School (commonly abbreviated "Wi Hi") is a high school located in Salisbury, Wicomico County, Maryland, United States. It is one of four public high schools in Wicomico County along with James M. Bennett High School, Mardela Middle and High School and Parkside High School. Wicomico High School currently enrolls grades 9 through 12. Its mascot is the Indian and its colors are blue and gold.

== History ==
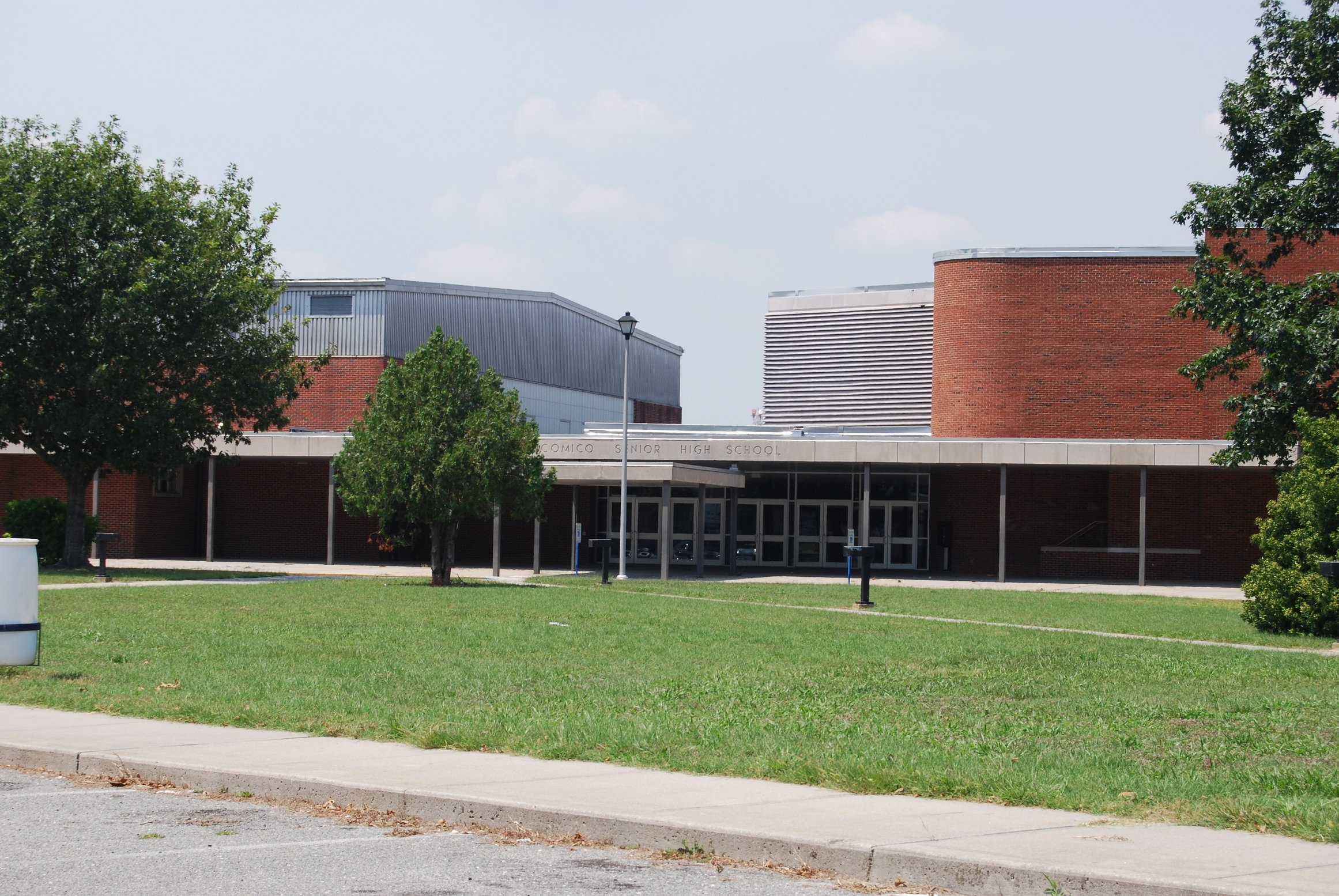
Wicomico High School

In 1931, the school moved to its previous campus on East Main Street. The building was quickly outgrown, and in 1954 the current facility on Long Avenue was completed at a price of 1.5 million dollars, and was named Wicomico Senior High School. In 1995, it was renamed to Wicomico High School. The former high school building on East Main Street is now Wicomico Middle School.

An administration building and an auditorium were added in 1975 and 1976. Additionally, extensive renovations were completed in 1995. At that time, Wicomico Senior High School was renamed Wicomico High School.

Susan Ward, an English teacher at Wicomico High School for 31 years, was recognized for her outstanding work in the classroom on March 21, 2007, when she was named 2007-08 Wicomico Teacher of the Year.

== Sports ==
Athletic programs offered at the school include the following:

- Fall: cheerleading, cross country, field hockey, football, golf, boys' soccer, girls' soccer, tennis, and volleyball.
- Winter: boys' basketball, girls' basketball, cheerleading, indoor track & field, strength & conditioning, and wrestling.
- Spring: boys' baseball, boys' lacrosse, girls' lacrosse, softball, outdoor track & field, bocce, and tennis.

== Notable alumni ==
- Christopher T. Adams, Maryland State Delegate
- Bill Belleville, author and documentary filmmaker
- Duane R. Bushey, former Master Chief Petty Officer of the Navy (MCPON)
- John Glover, actor on Smallville
- Linda Hamilton, actress
- Don B. Hughes, former Maryland State Delegate
- Davis R. Ruark, former Wicomico County State Attorney
- Paul Sarbanes, former US Senator
- Jeremy Schonbrunner, professional football player
- Mike Seidel, meteorologist

== See also ==
- List of high schools in Maryland
- Wicomico County Public Schools
