= Wicomico County Public Schools =

Public school district in Maryland, US

Address
- 2424 Northgate Drive Suite 100 Salisbury, Wicomico, Maryland, 21801; United States

District information
- Type: Public
- Grades: PreK-12
- Established: 1868; 158 years ago
- President: N. Eugene "Gene" Malone Jr.
- Vice-president: David A. Plotts
- Superintendent: Dr. Micah Stauffer
- Asst. superintendent(s): Dr. Frederick Briggs; Kimberly Miles; Dr. Brian Raygor
- School board: Susan W. Beauchamp; Allen C. Brown, Sr.; Dr. Bonnie H. Ennis; Kristin Hazel; N. Eugene "Gene" Malone Jr.; John Palmer; David A. Plotts
- Schools: 24
- Budget: $304 Million
- NCES District ID: 2400690

Students and staff
- Students: 14,889
- Teachers: 1,108
- Staff: 1,218
- Athletic conference: Bayside Conference

Other information
- Website: www.wicomicoschools.org

Wicomico County Public Schools is the public school district for Wicomico County, Maryland. WCPS has 24 schools, consisting of 16 elementary, 1 elementary/middle, 3 middle, 1 middle/high, and 3 high schools.

The district has over 15,000 students and close to 1,300 teachers. It is the largest school district on the Eastern Shore.

== Demographics ==
Ethnic composition of the district in 2020 was 44% Caucasian, 37% African American, 11% Hispanic/Latino, 3% Asian, 8% two races. As of 2020, the 4-year adjusted cohort graduation rate was 83.93%.

== Board of education ==
The Wicomico County Board of Education was previously appointed by the governor of Maryland. Beginning with the November 2018 election, the board transitioned to fully elected. It has one member elected from each of the five council districts, plus two elected at-large, in a non-partisan manner.

== List of Schools ==
The following are statistics from the FY 2024 Educational Facilities Master Plan - Facilities Inventory.

=== Elementary ===
School name	City or Community	Grades	Opening Date	Students	State Capacity	Square Footage
Beaver Run Elementary	Salisbury	PK - 2	2022	652	664	98,193
Chipman Elementary	Salisbury	PK - 1	1986	262	384	40,752
Delmar Elementary	Delmar	PK - 4	1978	858	683	76,645
East Salisbury Elementary	Salisbury	3 - 5	1942	421	424	61,889
Fruitland Primary Elementary	Fruitland	PK - 2	1955	441	474	56,308
Fruitland Intermediate Elementary	Fruitland	3 - 5	1937	393	378	43,712
Glen Avenue Elementary	Salisbury	2 - 5	1964	397	470	55,068
North Salisbury Elementary	Salisbury	3 - 5	2006	505	506	76,999
Northwestern Elementary	Mardela Springs	PK - 5	1966	341	251	26,800
Pemberton Elementary	Salisbury	PK - 5	2001	529	523	73,917
Pinehurst Elementary	Salisbury	PK - 5	1937	486	467	76,224
Prince Street Elementary	Salisbury	PK - 5	2008	854	616	73,830
West Salisbury Elementary	Salisbury	PK - 2	2018	346	352	60,833
Westside Primary Elementary	Quantico	PK - 1	1956	192	199	20,569
Westside Intermediate Elementary	Quantico	2 - 5	1999	343	414	54,797
Willards Elementary	Willards	PK - 3	2003	309	362	51,247

Delmar Elementary was previously until grade 6, but changed to being up to grade 5 in 2000 upon the opening of the new Delmar Middle School/Delmar High School complex of the Delmar School District. Residents of Delmar, Maryland may attend the Delmar, Delaware schools or they may attend Wicomico Middle School.

=== Middle ===
School name	City or Community	Grades	Opening Date	Students	State Capacity	Square Footage
Bennett Middle School	Fruitland	6 - 8	2015	906	1,114	161,304
Pittsville Elementary / Middle School	Pittsville	4 - 8	1956	329	505	79,335
Salisbury Middle School	Salisbury	6 - 8	1999	873	999	143,519
Wicomico Middle School	Salisbury	6 - 8	1931	819	914	135,750

In the late 1990s there was a movement to have Salisbury Middle School named after Charles Chipman, an African-American teacher who worked at Wicomico County schools. He originated from New Jersey.

=== High ===
School name	City or Community	Grades	Opening Date	Students	State Capacity	Square Footage
James M. Bennett High School	Salisbury	9 - 12	2010	1,343	1,496	247,202
Mardela Middle & High School	Mardela Springs	6 - 12	1937	691	616	87,633
Parkside High School	Salisbury	9 - 12	1975	1,160	944	277,724
Wicomico High School	Salisbury	9 - 12	1954	1,325	1,215	195,941
