= Danny Acosta (baseball) =

American baseball coach

Danny Acosta-Laureano MS., MA.
Coaching career (HC unless noted)
- 2021–2023: Iowa Lakes
- 2024–2026: Maryland Eastern Shore

Head coaching record
- Overall: 16–128 (.111) (NCAA); 22–133 (.142) (NJCAA)

Danny Acosta is an American baseball coach and former scout who was the head coach of the Maryland Eastern Shore Hawks baseball team, a Division I program. Before taking on the role, he worked as a scout for multiple Major League Baseball teams, served as a minor league hitting coach, and held assistant coaching positions at the collegiate level.

== Early career ==
At the age of 21, Acosta began his coaching career with stints in Florida and Puerto Rico. He then spent a few seasons as a scout for Major League Baseball organizations. From 1995 to 1999, Acosta served as a scout for the Texas Rangers, and as a scout for the Seattle Mariners in 1999.

Following his Major League Baseball experience, Acosta then went on to be a pitching coach in Puerto Rico for Santurce Cangrejeros, a professional team based in San Juan, Puerto Rico.

It was after coaching in Puerto Rico that Acosta began his career in college baseball, serving as an assistant at Iowa Lakes Community College from 2006 to 2010. After the 2010 season, Acosta returned to the Major Leagues as an associate scout for the San Francisco Giants for two seasons and then as a hitting coach for the Daytona Cubs.

Following his second stint in the Major and Minor Leagues, Acosta then returned to college baseball where he served as an Associate Head Coach at Piedmont International University where he worked for 3 seasons before returning to Iowa Lakes to become their head coach.

== Head coaching career ==
On May 28, 2020, Acosta was named head coach of the Iowa Lakes Lakers baseball team.

In 2021, Acosta completed his first season as head coach at Iowa Lakes, guiding the Lakers to a 3–41 conference record and a 6–52 overall record. The team finished the season with a run differential of -290.

In 2022, Acosta boosted the team from their winning percentage of.103% in 2021, posting a conference record of 6–27, and an overall record of 12–37 (.245%). The run differential also improved by 26 runs from 2021 to a -264.

During the 2023 season, Iowa Lakes posted a conference record of 1–32, with an overall record of 4–44. The end-of-the-year run differential was -366, giving them an average margin of victory of -7.63 runs. Following the season, Acosta would land a Division I head coaching position at the University of Maryland Eastern Shore.

In his first season as head coach at the University of Maryland Eastern Shore, Acosta faced continued challenges, as the team finished with an 0–48 record. The Hawks posted a conference record of 0–30 and finished last in the Northeast Conference. The team had a run differential of -365 during the 2024 season.

In his second season at UMES, Acosta collected his first Division-1 managerial win after the Hawks defeated Towson University 14-7. The win snapped a 55 game losing-streak for the Hawks that dated back to the 2023 NEC Tournament. The Hawks would finish the 2025 season with a 7-41 record, and a 6-24 conference record. While 2026 saw a slight improvement to the team's final record, finishing 9-39 overall with an 8-25 conference record, the Hawks still struggled mightily finishing last in the nation of 308 eligible teams in D1Baseball.com's RPI rankings.

== Coaching record ==
Record table
Season	Team	Overall	Conference	Standing	Postseason
Iowa Lakes Lakers (ICCAC) (2021–2023)
2021	Iowa Lakes CC	6–52	3-41		
2022	Iowa Lakes CC	12-37	6-27		
2023	Iowa Lakes CC	4-44	1-32		
Iowa Lakes CC:		22-133	10-100		
Maryland Eastern Shore Hawks (Northeast Conference) (2024–2026)
2024	Maryland Eastern Shore	0–48	0–30	12th	
2025	Maryland Eastern Shore	7–41	6–24	10th	
2026	Maryland Eastern Shore	9–39	8–25	11th	
Maryland Eastern Shore:		16–128	14–79		
Total:		16–128			
National champion Postseason invitational champion Conference regular season champion Conference regular season and conference tournament champion Division regular season champion Division regular season and conference tournament champion Conference tournament champion
