= Bill Belleville =

American author and filmmaker

Bill Belleville (February 17, 1945 -July 30, 2020 ) was an environmental writer, documentary filmmaker, and lecturer in the United States. He received the Order of the South award. His book Losing it all to Sprawl was named one of the "Best Books of the Year" by the Library Journal. "Salvaging the Real Florida" received top honors from the National Outdoors Book Awards. Other books he wrote have won regional honors, including The Peace of Blue, winner of the Silver Medal in the prestigious Florida Book Awards.

His book River of Lakes: A Journey on Florida's St. Johns River covers the 275 mile long St. Johns River. His extensive website documented many of his activities. In Search of Xanadu, shown on public television, follows Belleville on visits to various locations. His other work on documentaries included: "In Marjorie's Wake: Rediscovering Rawlings, a River & Time" National PBS release 2009-2010. (Co-produced & scripted), "Searching for Xanadu" Florida PBS Affiliates (co-produced and scripted), "Conch Cowboys" (Florida PBS Affiliates. co-produced and scripted), and "Wekiva: Legacy or Loss?" Florida PBS Affiliates (co-produced and scripted)

He was a co-founder of Equinox Documentaries, a nonprofit 501 (c)(3) organization dedicated to using films and related media for environmental education. Born in Germany

== Education and early career ==
He attended Wicomico Sr. High School in Salisbury, Maryland where he was an all-conference football player and ran track. He also attended Wesley College, University of Maryland, and University of Baltimore.

Belleville was a school social worker (SSA) in Baltimore City Public School System for two years.

== Other activities ==
He was a scuba diver. He volunteered with literacy programs and environmental groups. He was Writer-in-Residence during the 2004-2005 school year at the University of South Florida in its Florida Studies program.

== Works ==
- "The Peace of Blue: Water Journeys"
- "Salvaging the Real Florida: Lost & Found in the State of Dreams". 92,000 word anthology. UPF. early 2011. (cloth and paper)
- "Deep Cuba: The Inside Story of an American Oceanographic Expedition (University of Georgia Press. 2002) University of Georgia Press
- "Sunken Cities, Sacred Cenotes and Golden Sharks: Travels of a Water-Bound Adventurer", A collection of adventure-travel essays, articles and narrative essays
- "Losing it All to Sprawl: How Progress Ate my Cracker Landscape" (University Press of Florida. Spring 2006)
- "River of Lakes: A Journey on Florida’s St. Johns River" (University of Georgia Press 2000)
- "Rediscovering Rawlings, a River and Time: Filming In Marjorie's Wake on Florida's St. Johns River", a companion to the national PBS documentary "In Marjorie's Wake"
- River of Lakes: A Journey on Florida's St. Johns River (University of Georgia Press. ISBN 0-8203-2156-7)
