= Parkside High School =

Location
- 1015 Beaglin Park Drive; Salisbury, Maryland 21804; United States; 38°20′58″N 75°34′24″W

Information
- School type: Public High School (9-12)
- Opened: 1975
- School district: Wicomico County Public Schools
- Principal: Brian Briggs
- Grades: 9-12
- Campus: Rural
- Colors: Green and White
- Nickname: Rams
- Newspaper: The Rampage
- Website: phs.wicomicoschools.org
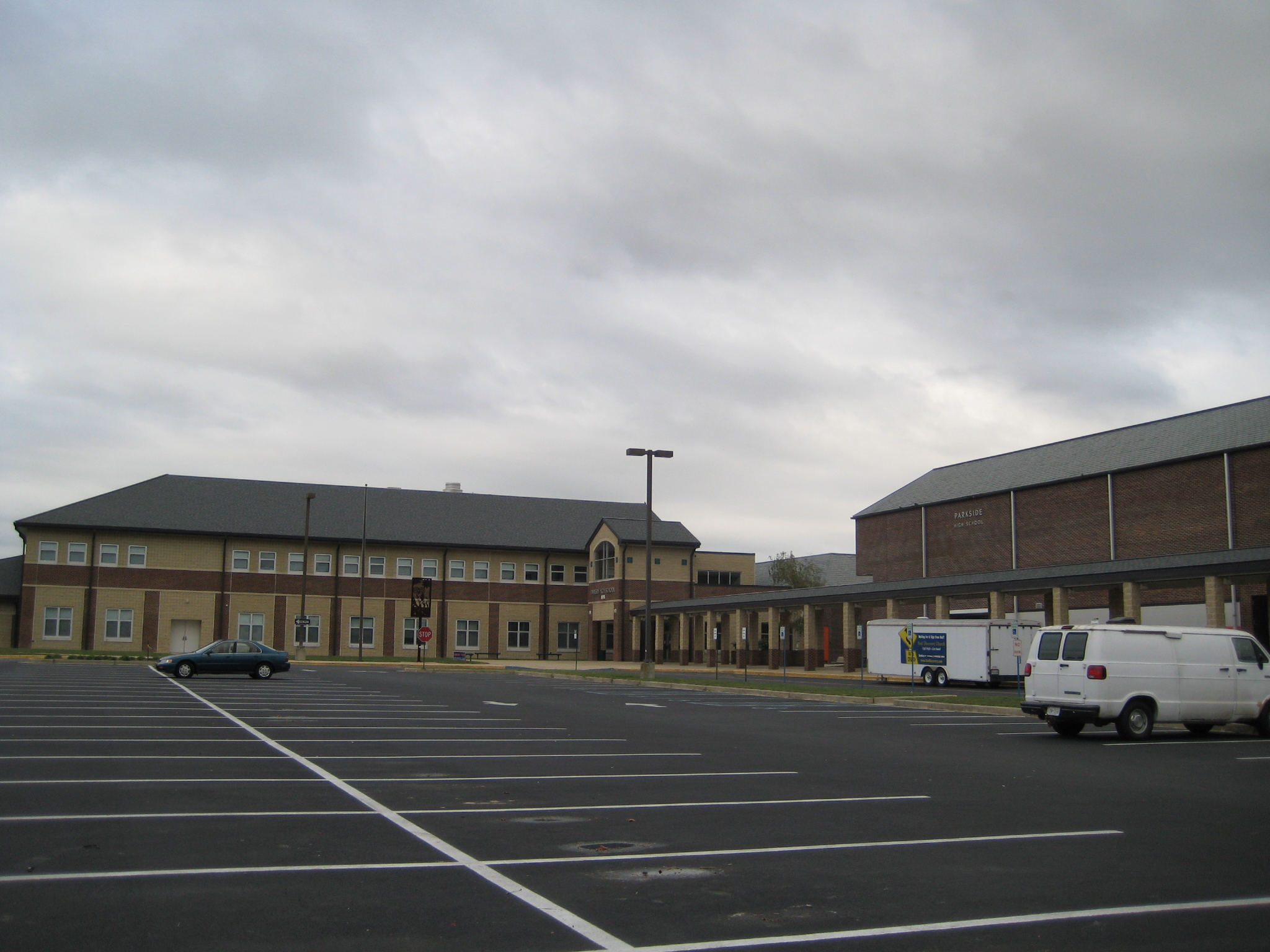

Parkside High School is a four-year public high school in Salisbury, Wicomico County, Maryland, United States. It is one of four public high schools in Wicomico County along with James Bennett High School, Wicomico High School, and Mardela Middle and High School.

== History ==
The school is located on the Eastern Shore of Maryland in the city of Salisbury in Wicomico County. The school is within a couple miles of Salisbury University, located south of U.S. 50 and Maryland Route 350, east of Maryland Route 12, and northwest of U.S. 13.

In 1997, the Career Technology Department of the Wicomico Applied Technology Center merged into Parkside High School. An addition of over 113,000 square feet (10,500 m^{2}) was constructed to accommodate the students.

The school's center is predominantly one story. This area houses the library, gym, auditorium, cafeteria, and the guidance offices, in addition to special subject classrooms, such as music and technology education. The two-story section of the school is home to the general education classrooms including such subjects as social studies, English, mathematics, foreign languages, marketing, science and business education.

The school is unique in that it houses the only planetarium within Wicomico County. This planetarium, located between the general education courses and the library, is open to use by all students of Wicomico County. The school offers an Astronomy course because of this unique feature. This class is taught by Anthony Goodyear, who has worked with NASA and other organizations and has a long history of scientific excellence. In February, 2008, Anthony Goodyear was named WMDT47's "Teacher Who Makes a Difference".

In addition, the school provides a variety of extracurricular clubs, activities, and teams. Clubs in existence at the school include: Marching Band, Surf Club, Art Club, Japanese Anime club, which is advised by Mr. Chris Grande, Varsity/JV Math Teams, Chess Club, Drama Club, National Honor Society, Science National Honor Society, Latin National Honor Society, Spanish National Honor Society, Junior Classical League, Mu Alpha Theta, Bible Club, Robotics Club (Tec-Tigers), Future Educators of America, Islam Awareness Club, WRAM News, Yearbook, and the Jazz Band.

== Sports ==
Athletic programs offered at the school include the following:

- Fall: cheerleading, cross country, field hockey, football, golf, boys' soccer, girls' soccer, tennis, and volleyball.
- Winter: boys' basketball, girls' basketball, cheerleading, indoor track & field, strength & conditioning, and wrestling.
- Spring: boys' baseball, boys' lacrosse, girls' lacrosse, softball, outdoor track & field, bocce, and tennis.

State Champions:

- 2023 Men’s Baseball
- 2021 Men's Soccer
- 2016 Indoor Track and Field Boys 4x800m relay
- 2011 Track and Field Girls 500m Run
- 2005 Field Hockey
- 2005 Golf
- 2005 Boys' Lacrosse
- 2004 Track and Field Boys Pole Vault & Girls High Jump
- 1999 Girls' Basketball
- 1995 Softball
- 1982 Softball
- 1980 Softball

== Notable alumni ==
- Alex Azar; Secretary of the U.S. Department of Health and Human Services (HHS)
- Fernando Guerrero; Professional boxer
