= Dick Rockwell Field =

Sports field in New York

- Interactive map of Dick Rockwell Field
- Location: Le Moyne College; 1419 Salt Springs Road, Syracuse, New York
- Coordinates: 43.050353°N 76.087765°W
- Owner: Le Moyne College
- Operator: Le Moyne College
- Surface: Grass
- Scoreboard: Electronic
- Field size: Left field: 314 feet (96 m); Center field: 375 feet (114 m); Right field: 337 feet (103 m)

Tenant
- Le Moyne Dolphins baseball (NCAA D1 NEC) Syracuse Salt Cats (New York Collegiate Baseball League) (2012-2013) Syracuse Spartans (New York Collegiate Baseball League) (2017)

Dick Rockwell Field is a ballpark located on the campus of Le Moyne College in Syracuse, New York. It is home to the Le Moyne Dolphins baseball team of the NCAA Division I Northeast Conference, and previously had hosted both the Syracuse Salt Cats and Syracuse Spartans of the New York Collegiate Baseball League. It is named after former Le Moyne head baseball coach and athletic director Dick Rockwell.

== Facilities ==
The ballpark features a two story press box behind home plate, a concession stand, fixed seating, as well as three turfed batting cages and a grass berm.

== Renovations ==
A new Daktronics electric scoreboard was added in 2021, with the dugouts being rebuilt in 2024. Fundraising is underway to replace the current bleachers with permanent seatback seating.

== See also ==
- List of NCAA Division I baseball venues
