= Hawk Stadium =

Baseball venue in Princess Anne, Maryland, US

- Location within Maryland Location within the United States
- Interactive map of Hawk Stadium
- Location: College Backbone Drive and Hickory Road, Princess Anne, Maryland, USA
- Coordinates: 38.211272°N 75.685598°W
- Owner: University of Maryland Eastern Shore
- Operator: University of Maryland Eastern Shore
- Capacity: 1,000
- Surface: Natural grass
- Scoreboard: Electronic
- Field size: 340 ft. (LF); 385 ft. (LCF); 400 ft. (CF); 385 ft. (RCF); 340 ft. (RF)
- Public transit: Shore Transit bus: 252, 255, 705N

Construction
- Renovated: 2008, 2018-2019

Tenant
- Maryland Eastern Shore Hawks baseball (NCAA DI NEC)

Hawk Stadium is a baseball venue in Princess Anne, Maryland, United States. It is home to the Maryland Eastern Shore Hawks baseball team of the NCAA Division I Northeast Conference. The venue has a capacity of 1,000 spectators. It is located behind the Hytche Athletic Center, the home of UMES basketball.

The stadium has been renovated twice. In 2008, the field was resodded, new wind screens and foul poles were added, and the dugouts and press box were repainted. In 2018 and 2019, sod was replaced, the outfield wall was rebuilt, and a new scoreboard was installed while the Hawks played both seasons at Arthur W. Perdue Stadium in Salisbury, Maryland. The Hawks 2020 season was also scheduled at Perdue Stadium "while renovations continue[d] at their on-campus facility." The 2021 season was cancelled due to the COVID-19 pandemic. The Hawks 2022 season was also played at Perdue Stadium.

== See also ==
- List of NCAA Division I baseball venues
