= Maryland Eastern Shore Hawks baseball =

- 2026 Maryland Eastern Shore Hawks baseball team
- Founded: 1957
- Conference history: CIAA (1967–1970)
- University: University of Maryland Eastern Shore
- Athletic director: Keith Davidson
- Head coach: Justin Thomas (1st season)
- Conference: Northeast Conference
- Location: Princess Anne, Maryland
- Home stadium: Hawk Stadium (capacity: 1,000)
- Nickname: Hawks
- Colors: Maroon and gray

Conference regular season champions
- 1995

The Maryland Eastern Shore Hawks baseball team, also known as the Eastern Shore Hawks, is the varsity intercollegiate athletic team of the University of Maryland Eastern Shore in Princess Anne, Maryland, United States. The team competes in the National Collegiate Athletic Association's Division I and is a member of the Northeast Conference (NEC). Through the 2022 season, the Hawks had competed in the school's full-time home of the Mid-Eastern Athletic Conference (MEAC), but after that season, the MEAC merged its baseball league into that of the NEC. Eastern Shore and the three other MEAC members that sponsored baseball became NEC associate members in that sport. The program has never had substantial success in Division I, having never made the NCAA Tournament or won a conference championship.

== History ==
The team won the regular season championship in 1995, going 14-4 in MEAC play. In 2006, they finished as runner-up in the MEAC tournament to Bethune-Cookman, losing 14-0 in the final.

=== Stadium Challenges and the 2023 Season ===
The Hawks initially played their home games at Hawk Stadium on campus. However, due to its deteriorating condition and failure to meet Division I baseball standards, the team was forced to relocate. From 2018 to 2022, they played at Arthur W. Perdue Stadium, home of the Delmarva Shorebirds.

In 2023, the Hawks moved again, this time to the Henry S. Parker Athletic Complex, a county-owned facility in Salisbury, Maryland. The complex features eight baseball and softball fields used by various amateur, high school, and youth teams. The Hawks specifically play on Field Six within the complex.

Under head coach Brian Hollamon, the Hawks finished eighth out of 13 teams in the Northeast Conference, posting a 14-16 conference record and an 18-37 overall record in the 2023 season. Despite the team's relative success during his final two seasons, the decision was made to move on from Hollamon, and he was replaced with Danny Acosta for the 2024 season.

Despite previous statements from UMES Director of Athletics Tara Owens indicating that a new stadium would be ready for the 2024 season, the team remained at the Henry S. Parker Athletic Complex for both the 2024 and 2025 seasons. In 2026, the Hawks were finally able to return to Princess Anne for their home games as renovations to their stadium were completed.

== The Danny Acosta Era ==
Following the 2023 season, Maryland Eastern Shore hired Danny Acosta as head coach. In his first season in 2024, the Hawks struggled, finishing with a 0–30 record in conference play and 0–48 overall. They finally won a game on February 22, 2025.

After posting a 16-128 record across three seasons, Acosta was fired by the Hawks.

== Head coaches ==
Year(s)	Coach	Seasons	W–L–T	Pct
2004–2006	Robert Rodriguez	3	27–118–2	.188
2007–2012	Will Gardner	6	61–260	.190
2013–2014	Pedro Swann	2	21–80	.208
2015–2016	John O'Neil	2	32–65	.330
2017	Charlie Goens	1	12–40	.231
2018–2023	Brian Hollamon	5	43–132	.246
2024–2026	Danny Acosta	3	16–128	.111
Totals	6	17	212–823–2	.205
