= Joe Cannon Stadium =

Baseball stadium in Hanover, Maryland

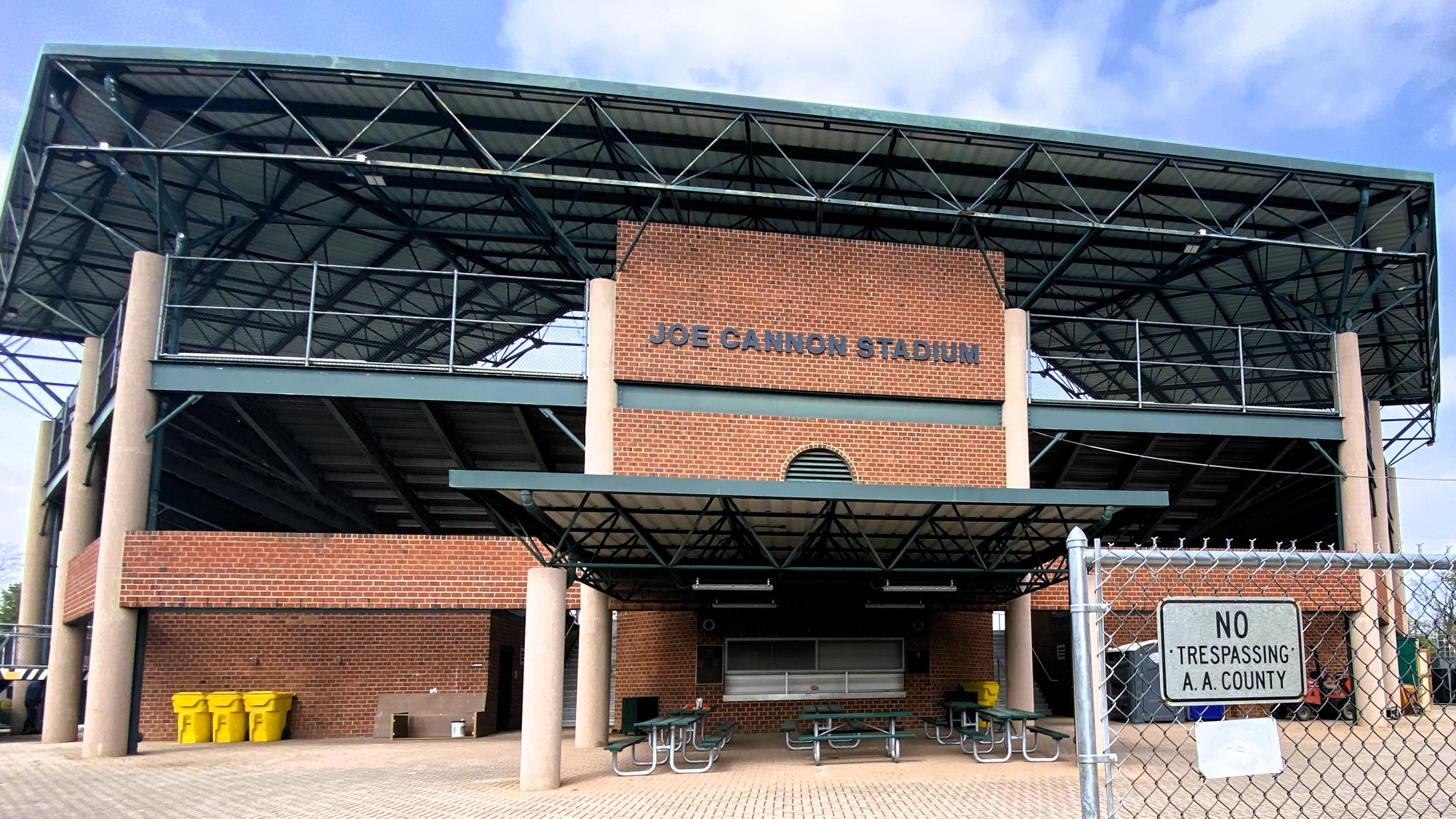
- Joe Cannon Stadium in April 2021.

- Location within Maryland Joe Cannon Stadium (the United States)
- Interactive map of Joe Cannon Stadium
- Address: 7551 Teague Road, Hanover, MD 21076
- Location: Hanover, Maryland
- Coordinates: 39°09′15″N 76°43′02″W
- Owner: Anne Arundel County, Maryland
- Operator: Anne Arundel County, Maryland
- Capacity: 1,500
- Surface: turf
- Field size: Left field: 310 ft (94 m); Left-center field: 380 ft (120 m); Center field: 410 ft (120 m); Right-center field: 380 ft (120 m); Right field: 310 ft (94 m)

Construction
- Opened: September 16, 1990 or April 19, 1991

Tenants
- Coppin State Eagles (NEC); Baltimore Dodgers (CRCBL)

Joe Cannon Stadium is a baseball stadium in Hanover, Maryland. It is the home field of the Coppin State Eagles baseball team of the Division I Northeast Conference. It was also formerly the home field of the Baltimore Dodgers of the Cal Ripken Collegiate Baseball League, a collegiate summer baseball league. Joe Cannon Stadium also plays host to many high school and amateur league games. The stadium holds 1,500 spectators.

It is named after former Laurel, Maryland resident M. Joseph Cannon, who had served as the first president of the Maryland City Little League, coordinated countless baseball tournaments, and was instrumental in unifying the Anne Arundel County youth football leagues.

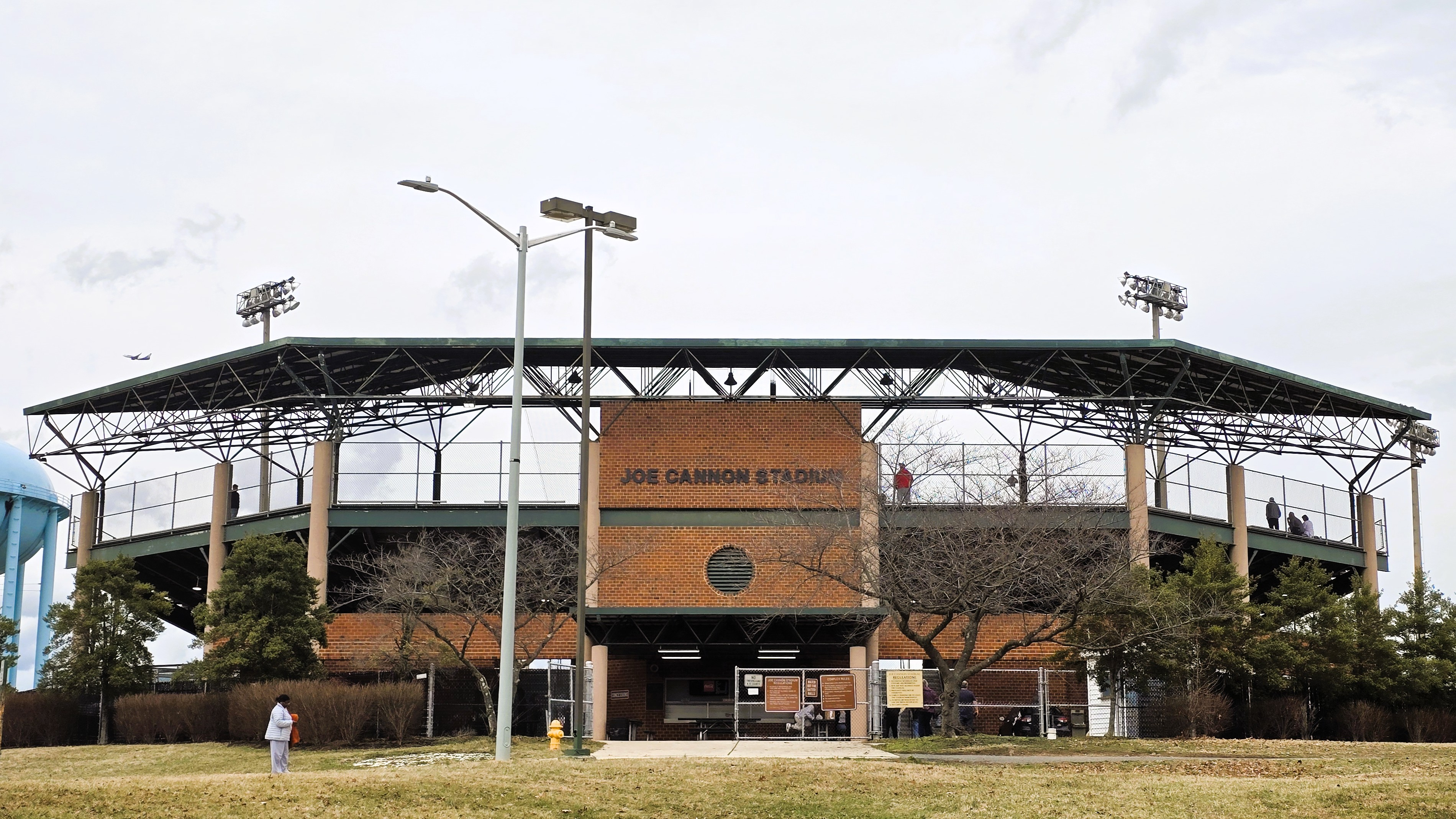
Exterior view

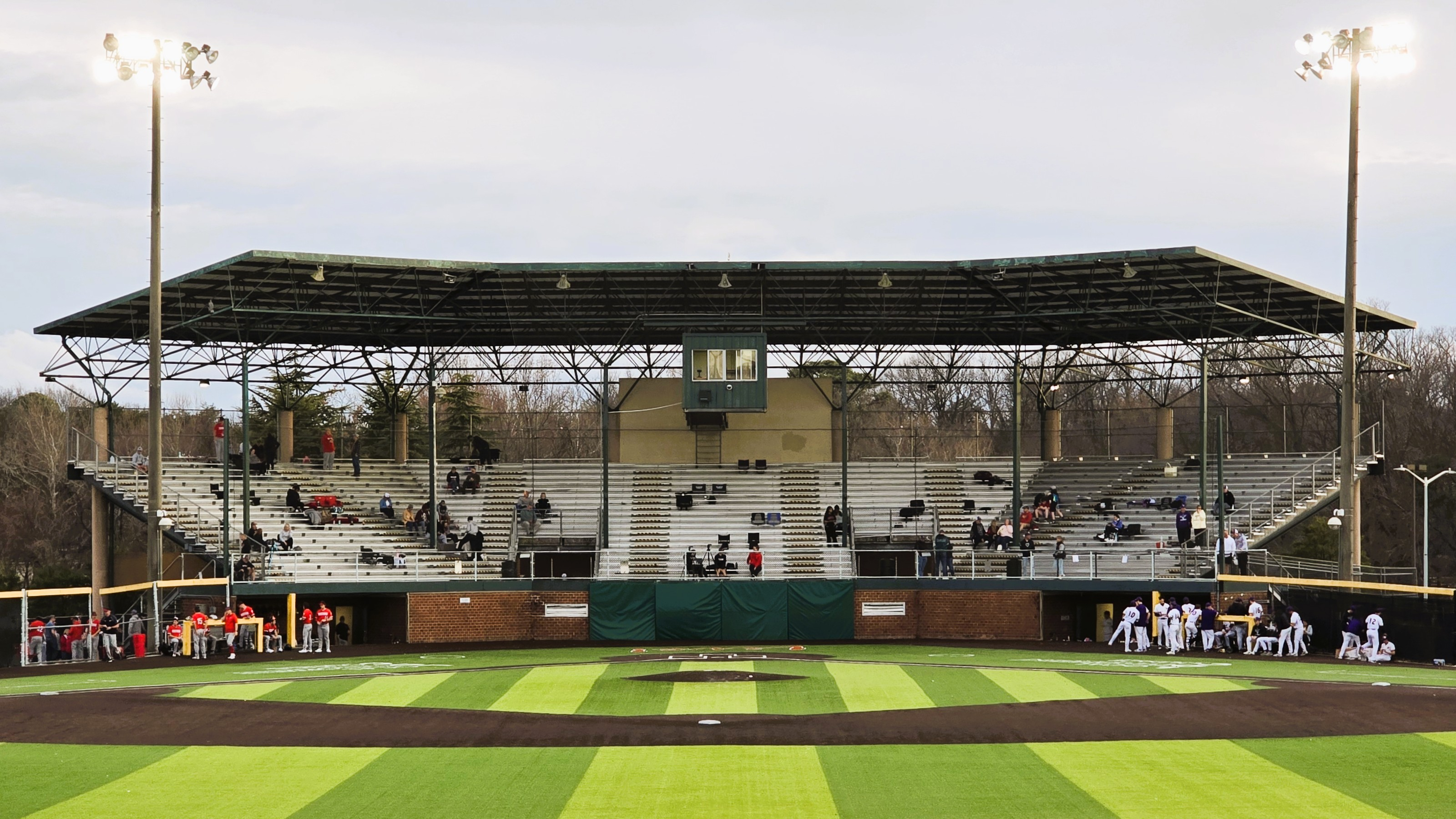
Interior view

== See also ==
- List of NCAA Division I baseball venues
