= Mardela Springs, Maryland =

- Town
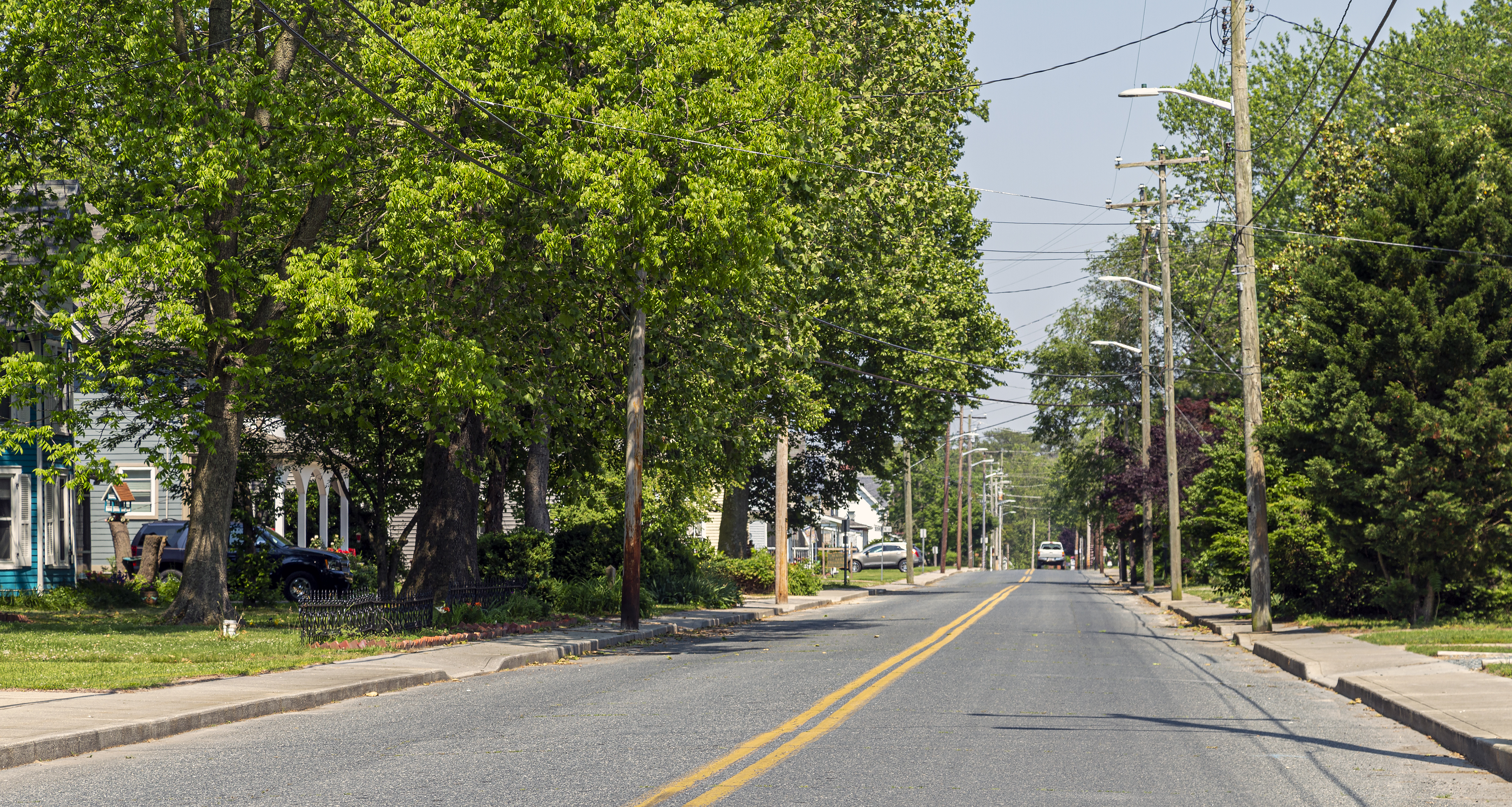

- Flag Seal

- Location of Mardela Springs, Maryland
- Coordinates: 38°27′36″N 75°45′21″W
- Country: United States
- State: Maryland
- County: Wicomico
- Incorporated: 1906

Area
  - Total: 0.41 sq mi (1.07 km^{2})
  - Land: 0.41 sq mi (1.05 km^{2})
  - Water: 0.0077 sq mi (0.02 km^{2})
- Elevation: 26 ft (8 m)

Population (2020)
  - Total: 357
  - Density: 878.3/sq mi (339.13/km^{2})
- Time zone: UTC-5 (Eastern (EST))
  - Summer (DST): UTC-4 (EDT)
- ZIP code: 21837
- Area codes: 410, 443
- FIPS code: 24-50525
- GNIS feature ID: 0590738
- Website: mardelasprings.org

Mardela Springs is a town in Wicomico County, Maryland, United States. The population was 356 at the 2020 census. It is included in the Salisbury, Maryland-Delaware Metropolitan Statistical Area.

== History ==
The area around Mardela Springs was home to indigenous tribes. Europeans brought fur trading to the area. Mineral springs attracted tourists in the 19th century and a spring water company.

== Geography ==
Mardela Springs is located at 38°27′36″N 75°45′21″W (38.460098, -75.755785).

According to the United States Census Bureau, the town has a total area of 0.40 square miles (1.04 km^{2}), of which 0.39 square miles (1.01 km^{2}) is land and 0.01 square miles (0.03 km^{2}) is water.

=== Climate ===
The climate in this area is characterized by hot, humid summers and generally mild to cool winters. According to the Köppen Climate Classification system, Mardela Springs has a humid subtropical climate, abbreviated "Cfa" on climate maps.

== Education ==
The Mardela Middle and High School is located in Mardela Springs. It has a student occupation of 728 people. There are fifteen students for every teacher.

== Demographics ==
Historical population
Census	Pop.	Note	%±
1930	370		—
1940	418		13.0%
1950	428		2.4%
1960	380		−11.2%
1970	356		−6.3%
1980	320		−10.1%
1990	360		12.5%
2000	364		1.1%
2010	347		−4.7%
2020	357		2.9%
U.S. Decennial Census

=== 2010 census ===
As of the census of 2010, there were 347 people, 134 households, and 97 families living in the town. The population density was 889.7 inhabitants per square mile (343.5/km^{2}). There were 160 housing units at an average density of 410.3 per square mile (158.4/km^{2}). The racial makeup of the town was 88.2% White, 6.9% African American, 0.6% Asian, 0.6% Pacific Islander, 0.6% from other races, and 3.2% from two or more races. Hispanic or Latino people of any race were 2.3% of the population.

There were 134 households, of which 36.6% had children under the age of 18 living with them, 53.7% were married couples living together, 14.2% had a female householder with no husband present, 4.5% had a male householder with no wife present, and 27.6% were non-families. 22.4% of all households were made up of individuals, and 11.9% had someone living alone who was 65 years of age or older. The average household size was 2.59 and the average family size was 3.00.

The median age in the town was 37.9 years. 27.1% of residents were under the age of 18; 6.7% were between the ages of 18 and 24; 27.9% were from 25 to 44; 25.3% were from 45 to 64; and 13% were 65 years of age or older. The gender makeup of the town was 50.7% male and 49.3% female.

=== 2000 census ===
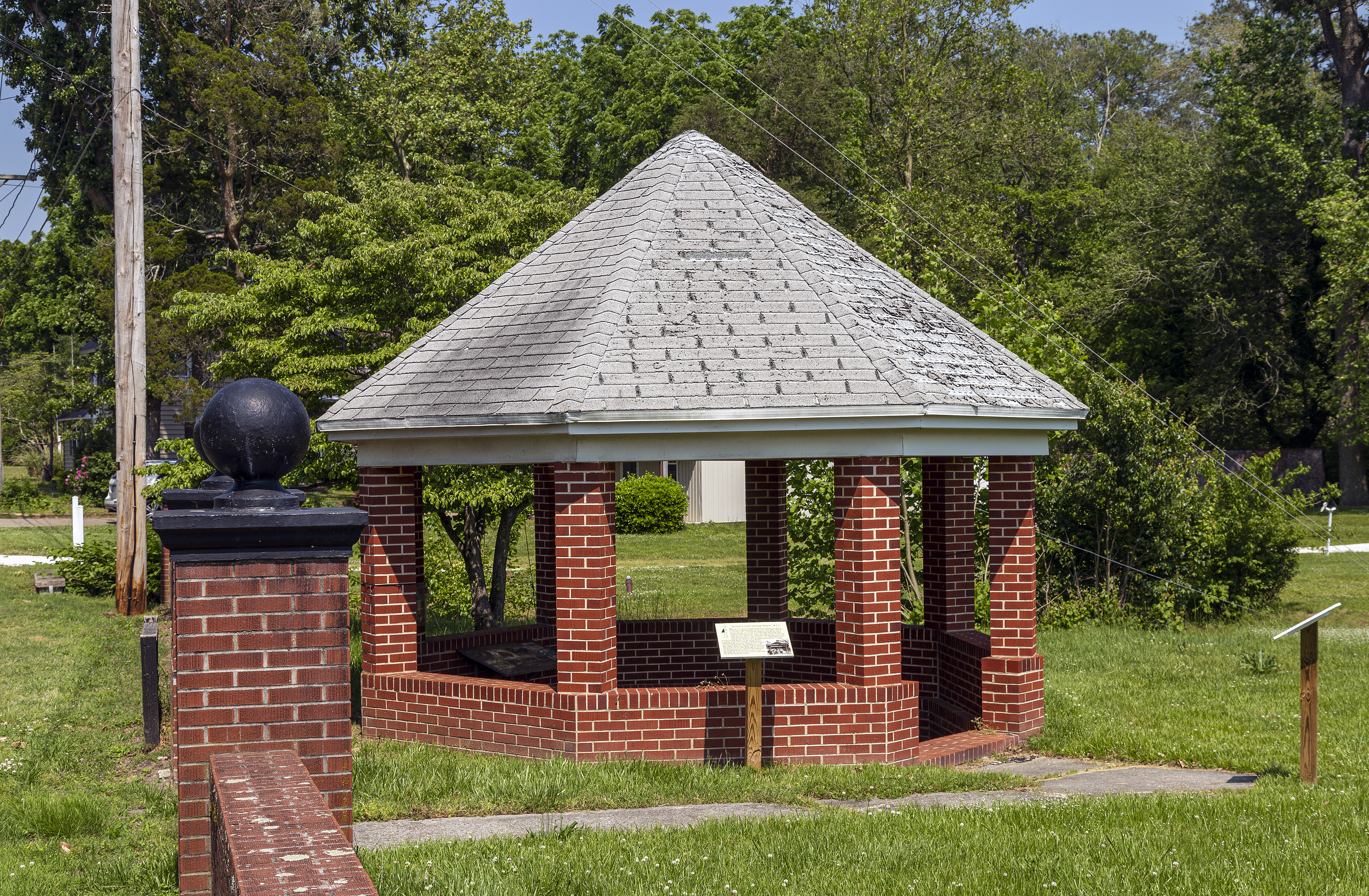
Barren Creek Springs springhouse

As of the census of 2000, there were 364 people, 135 households, and 93 families living in the town. The population density was 1,009.2 inhabitants per square mile (389.7/km^{2}). There were 159 housing units at an average density of 440.8 per square mile (170.2/km^{2}). The racial makeup of the town was 90.93% White, 5.49% African American, 0.55% Native American, 1.92% from other races, and 1.10% from two or more races. Hispanic or Latino people of any race were 4.40% of the population.

There were 135 households, out of which 37.8% had children under the age of 18 living with them, 52.6% were married couples living together, 7.4% had a female householder with no husband present, and 30.4% were non-families. 23.0% of all households were made up of individuals, and 12.6% had someone living alone who was 65 years of age or older. The average household size was 2.67 and the average family size was 3.15.

In the town, the population was spread out, with 29.1% under the age of 18, 8.2% from 18 to 24, 30.2% from 25 to 44, 20.6% from 45 to 64, and 11.8% who were 65 years of age or older. The median age was 34 years. For every 100 females, there were 95.7 males. For every 100 females age 18 and over, there were 85.6 males.

The median income for a household in the town was $37,500, and the median income for a family was $46,250. Males had a median income of $35,125 versus $20,000 for females. The per capita income for the town was $17,580. About 6.8% of families and 6.9% of the population were below the poverty line, including 5.4% of those under age 18 and 2.9% of those age 65 or over.

== Notable people ==
- Erin Burnett, CNN anchor
