= Mardela Middle and High School =

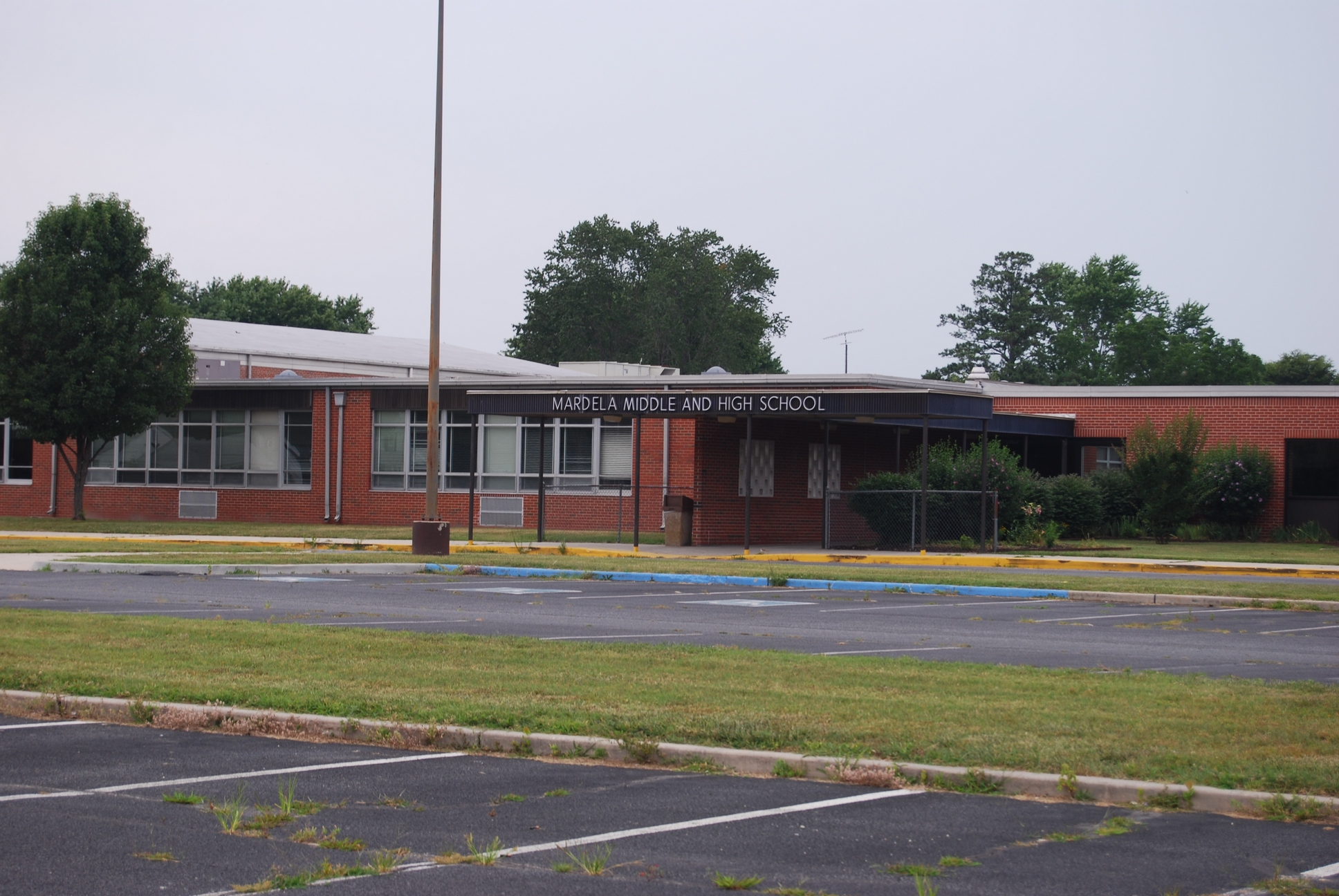

Location
- 24940 Delmar Road; Mardela Springs, Maryland 21837; United States; 38.4652°N 75.7471°W

Information
- Type: Public high school
- Opened: 1937
- School board: Wicomico County Board of Education
- School district: Wicomico Public Schools
- NCES School ID: 240069001306
- Principal: Liza Hastings
- Grades: 6–12
- Enrollment: 742 (2024–25)
- Campus: Suburban
- Colours: Green and gold
- Athletics: Maryland 1A
- Athletics conference: Bayside
- Team name: Warriors
- Yearbook: The Warrior
- Website: Mardela Middle and High School website

Mardela Middle and High School (MMHS) is a seven-year public middle school and high school in Mardela Springs, Wicomico County, Maryland, United States. It is the only combination middle and high school in Wicomico County Public Schools.

== Overview ==
The school is located on the Eastern Shore of Maryland in the town of Mardela Springs in Wicomico County. The school is on Maryland Route 54, east of Maryland Route 313 and just north of U.S. 50. Mardela Springs is between the Eastern Shore towns of Vienna and Hebron.

The current school building was constructed between 1978 and 1980, on the same site as the previous school, which was built in 1937. The current building has 118,993 square feet (11,054.8 m^{2}) of space and is located on 50.56 acres (20.46 ha) of land.

== Sports ==
Athletic programs offered at the school include the following:

- Fall: cheerleading, cross country, golf, boys' soccer, girls' soccer, and tennis
- Winter: boys' basketball, girls' basketball, cheerleading, indoor track & field, strength & conditioning, and wrestling
- Spring: baseball and softball

=== State champions ===
- 2025 - softball
- 1982 - girls' field hockey
- 1980 - softball
- 1978 - girls' field hockey

=== State finalist ===
- 2024 - girls' soccer
- 1981 - softball
- 1979 - girls' field hockey
- 1978 - girls' basketball
- 1978 - softball

=== State semi-finalist ===
- 2023 - girls' soccer
- 2023 - softball
- 2013 - boys' soccer
- 2007-2011 - girls' soccer
- 2002 - girls' basketball
- 1997 - girls' basketball
- 1994 - softball
- 1991 - softball
- 1990 - girls' basketball
- 1989 - softball
- 1988 - girls' basketball
- 1987 - softball
- 1977 - girls' basketball
- 1976 - softball
- 1973 - boys' soccer
- 1955 - boys' basketball
- 1950 - boys' basketball

== Photo gallery ==
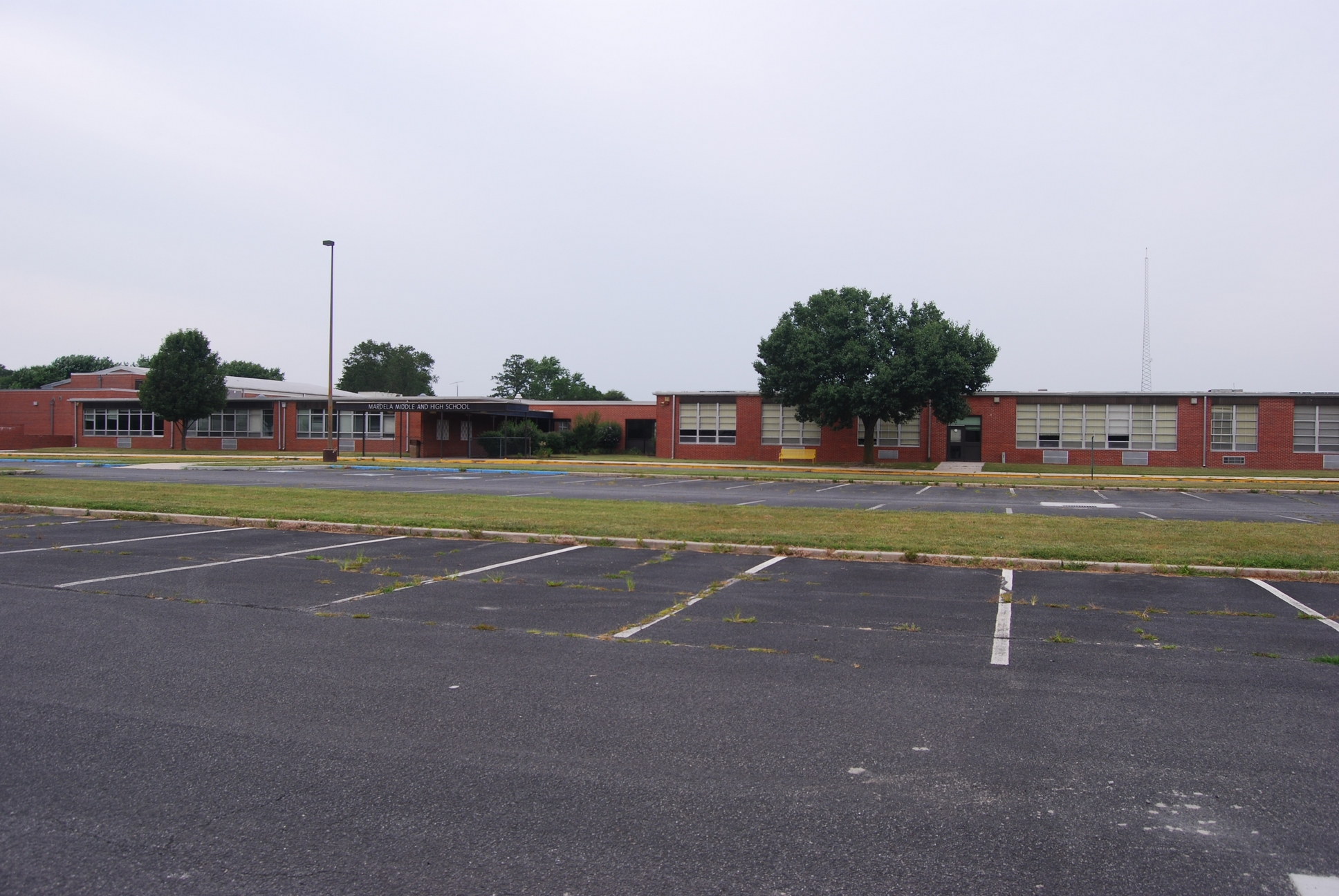
Mardela Springs Middle High School

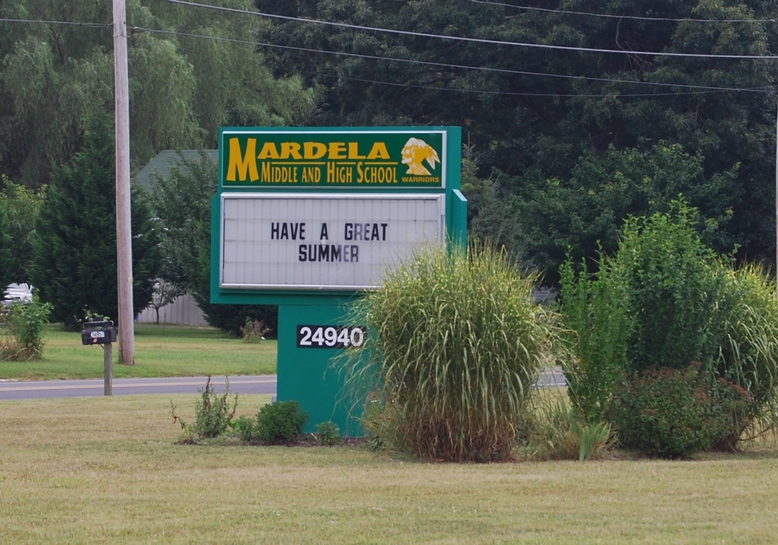
Mardela Middle High School sign

== Notable alumni ==
- Tia Jackson (1990), former WNBA player and coach for the Duke Blue Devils
- Brian Hollamon (1991), former baseball coach for the Maryland Eastern Shore Hawks

== See also ==
- Wicomico County Public Schools
- List of high schools in Maryland
