= Northeast Conference =

D-1 college athletic conference

NEC
- Formerly: Eastern College Athletic Conference Metro (1981–1988); Northeast Conference (1988–2025)
- Association: NCAA
- Founded: 1981
- Commissioner: Dan Lynch (since 2026)
- Sports fielded: 25; men's: 12; women's: 13
- Division: Division I
- Subdivision: FCS
- No. of teams: 9 (7 on July 1, 2027)
- Headquarters: Bridgewater, New Jersey
- Region: Northeast, Illinois
- Broadcasters: ESPN, YES, NESN, SNP
- Streaming partners: ESPN+, NESN Nation, RYZ Sports Network, NEC Front Row
- Website: necsports.com

Locations

The NEC (formerly the Northeast Conference) is a collegiate athletic conference whose schools are members of the National Collegiate Athletic Association (NCAA). Teams in the NEC compete in Division I for all sports; football competes in the Division I Football Championship Subdivision (FCS). Participating schools are located principally in the Northeastern United States, from which the conference derives its name.

== History ==
NEC
NEC Member locations
– Full member
– Departing full member

The conference was named the ECAC Metro Conference when it was established in 1981. The original eleven member schools were Fairleigh Dickinson University, the Brooklyn campus of Long Island University (whose athletic program has now merged with that of LIU's Post campus into a single athletic program), Loyola College in Maryland (left in 1989), Marist College (left in 1997), Robert Morris University (left in 2020), St. Francis College (NY) (left in 2023), Saint Francis College (PA) (left in 2026), Siena College (left in 1984), Towson State University (left in 1982), the University of Baltimore (left in 1983) and Wagner College.

The conference's name was changed to Northeast Conference on August 1, 1988. Other names considered were Big North, Great North, North Shore, Northern, Northeastern, Eastern and Eastern Private Intercollegiate.

The Northeast Conference has admitted new members ten times since 1981. The expansions and additions from the original charter members were in 1985 (Monmouth University, which left in 2013), in 1989 (Mount St. Mary's University, which left in 2022), in 1992 (Rider University, which left in 1997), in 1997 (Central Connecticut State University), in 1998 (Quinnipiac University which left in 2013, and the University of Maryland, Baltimore County which left in 2003), in 1999 (Sacred Heart University, which left in 2024), in 2008 (Bryant University, which also left in 2022), in 2019 (Merrimack College, which also left in 2024), in 2022 (Stonehill College, leaving in 2027), in 2023 (Le Moyne College, also leaving in 2027), 2024 (Chicago State University and Mercyhurst University) and in 2025 (University of New Haven). The Northeast Conference's full membership was its largest at 12 in 2008, with the addition of Bryant University. It then dropped to 10 in 2013, with the departure of Monmouth and Quinnipiac for the Metro Atlantic Athletic Conference (MAAC), returned to 11 with the 2019 addition of Merrimack, and again dropped to 10 in 2020 with the departure of Robert Morris for the Horizon League. The conference dropped to nine members in 2022, with the departure of Bryant and Mount St. Mary's, respectively for the America East Conference and the MAAC, plus the addition of Stonehill. On March 20, 2023, St. Francis Brooklyn announced that all intercollegiate sports would be dropped effective at the end of the 2022–23 season, dropping the NEC down to eight full members. This was followed on May 10, 2023, by the announcement that Le Moyne College would begin a transition from Division II and join the NEC on July 1.

Additional changes were announced in 2018 and took effect with the 2019–20 school year. First, on September 10, the NEC announced it would add Merrimack. Then, on October 3, Long Island University announced that it would combine its two existing athletic programs—NEC member LIU Brooklyn and the Division II program at LIU Post—into a single Division I program under the LIU name. The new LIU program, nicknamed Sharks, maintains LIU Brooklyn's previous memberships in Division I and the NEC. Another recent change took place on July 1, 2020, when charter member Robert Morris left to join the Horizon League. The next changes in membership were on July 1, 2022, with Bryant leaving for the America East Conference, Mount St. Mary's leaving for the MAAC, and Stonehill arriving from NCAA Division II.

The Northeast Conference has a total of 10 full members in 24 championship sports: baseball, men's and women's basketball, women's bowling, men's and women's cross country, women's field hockey, football, men's and women's golf, men's and women's indoor track & field, women's lacrosse, men's and women's outdoor track & field, men's and women's soccer, softball, men's and women's swimming, men's and women's tennis, and men's and women's volleyball.

Men's lacrosse became the league's 23rd sport for the 2011 season. The number of sports dropped to 22 after the 2012–13 school year, when the conference dropped field hockey. The departure of Monmouth and Quinnipiac to become all-sports members of the Metro Atlantic Athletic Conference (MAAC) in July 2013, gave the MAAC four full members that sponsored the sport; the other two were NEC single-sport affiliates Rider and Siena. The MAAC then decided to add field hockey as a sponsored sport for the 2013 season, and all of the NEC's remaining field hockey programs eventually joined the MAAC except for Saint Francis (PA), which joined the Atlantic 10 Conference. The NEC reinstated field hockey as a sponsored sport for the 2019 season with seven members—full members Bryant, LIU, Merrimack, Sacred Heart, and Wagner, plus associate members Fairfield and Rider. Saint Francis (PA) rejoined the NEC in field hockey during the 2021–22 season. A more recent addition to the NEC's sports roster was men's swimming & diving, added for 2020–21 with full members Bryant, LIU, Mount St. Mary's, St. Francis Brooklyn, and Wagner plus incoming associate member Howard.

In 2022–23, the NEC added one sport and dropped another. On September 30, 2021, the NEC announced that it would begin sponsoring men's volleyball in 2022–23 with six members. Before the end of the 2021–22 school year, the NEC announced that two Division II schools from the Buffalo, New York area, Daemen and D'Youville, would also become part of the new men's volleyball league. In a May 9, 2022 Twitter post, NEC commissioner Noreen Morris indicated that the NEC would shut down its men's lacrosse league after the then-ongoing 2022 season. The NEC had already lost two full members that sponsored the sport, and would eventually lose its two affiliate members in that sport when the Atlantic 10 Conference announced it would launch a men's lacrosse league in the 2023 season. Three of the remaining four NEC men's lacrosse programs became affiliate members of the Metro Atlantic Athletic Conference. The other program, Merrimack, was in talks with several lacrosse-sponsoring conferences for affiliate membership, and eventually joined the America East in time for the 2023 season.

In July 2022, the Northeast Conference announced a partnership with the Mid-Eastern Athletic Conference in which MEAC schools sponsoring baseball and men's and women's golf would become affiliate members in their respective sports beginning in the 2022–23 season. That September, the NEC announced that MEAC member Delaware State, which had just joined NEC baseball and women's golf, would add women's lacrosse and women's soccer to its NEC membership in 2023–24.

In March 2023, St. Francis College (Brooklyn) announced that it would discontinue its athletic programs at the end of the spring 2023 schedule. Le Moyne was announced as SFC's replacement that May.

The NEC added two affiliate members in 2023–24—Binghamton University in men's golf plus men's and women's tennis, and Niagara University in bowling. Niagara added that sport for 2023–24 by effectively absorbing the bowling program of Medaille University, a nearby Division III school that closed at the end of the 2022–23 school year.

In October 2023, the Metro Atlantic Athletic Conference announced that Merrimack and Sacred Heart were going to join the conference for the 2024–25 season. This announcement came on the heels of the announcement that the NEC was going to support men's lacrosse as a conference sponsored sport for the 2024–25 academic year, after having to discontinue it two years earlier due to the lack of sponsoring members. The original plan was for full members Le Moyne, LIU, Merrimack, Sacred Heart, and Wagner to be joined by two new associate members, the University of Detroit Mercy and the Virginia Military Institute (VMI). The departure of Merrimack and Sacred Heart left the number of men's lacrosse programs in the conference with less than the 6 member minimum required for an automatic bid to the NCAA Division I men's lacrosse tournament. The NEC announced in November 2023 that Cleveland State University and former full member Robert Morris would join the league as men's lacrosse associates. In November 2023, Robert Morris also announced that it would return to the NEC in football. Shortly thereafter, Maryland Eastern Shore announced that it would add men's volleyball in the 2026 season (2025–26 school year) as an NEC associate member, increasing the number of NEC teams to four. It became the first historically black Division I member to announce the addition of that sport. In April 2024, Sacred Heart announced that it was going to leave NEC men's volleyball and return to the Eastern Intercollegiate Volleyball Association, where it had played that sport before the NEC established its own league. Also in 2024–25, former full member Monmouth returned to the NEC as an associate member in bowling. Soon after the start of the 2024–25 academic year, Manhattan University announced that it was going to add men's volleyball and become an NEC affiliate in 2025–26.

In response to the departure of Merrimack and Sacred Heart, the NEC announced first in December 2023 that D-I independent Chicago State University was going to join the NEC. A few months later, in April 2024, Mercyhurst University announced that it was going to transition from Division II and join the NEC, bringing the league to nine members again for the 2024–25 season.

On March 25, 2025, Saint Francis University announced it would transition from Division I to Division III following the 2025–26 academic year.

On May 6, 2025, the University of New Haven announced it had accepted an invitation to join the conference and begin its reclassification from Division II starting on July 1, 2025.

On October 2, 2025, the conference announced that it would be dropping the Northeast Conference name and officially become known as the NEC, making it an orphaned initialism.

On October 22, 2026, Le Moyne announced it will depart the NEC to join the Metro Conference on July 1, 2027. One month later on November 13, 2026, Stonehill also announced their departure to the Metro conference on July 1, 2027.

Currently, a total of 20 affiliate members compete in football, women's golf, men's and women's lacrosse, men's and women's soccer, men's and women's swimming, women's bowling, field hockey, and men's volleyball.

== Member schools ==
=== Full members ===
==== Current full members ====
Institution	Location	Founded	Type	Enrollment	Endowment (millions, 2022)	Nickname	Joined (Note: Represents the calendar year when fall sports competition begins.)	Colors
Central Connecticut State University	New Britain, Connecticut	1849	Public	9,546	$63.0	Blue Devils	1997	
Chicago State University	Chicago, Illinois	1867	Public (TMCF)	2,620	$9.7	Cougars	2024	
Fairleigh Dickinson University	Teaneck, New Jersey	1942	Nonsectarian	8,590	$88.3	Knights	1981	
Le Moyne College	DeWitt, New York (Note: The campus has a Syracuse mailing address, but almost entirely lies within the adjacent town of DeWitt.)	1946	Catholic (Jesuit)	3,409	$180.4	Dolphins	2023	
Long Island University (Note: Prior to 2019–20, LIU operated two separate athletic programs, with only that of the school's Brooklyn campus being an NEC member.)	Brooklyn and Brookville, New York (Note: The merged LIU athletic program bases some sports at the Brooklyn campus and others at the Post campus in Brookville, New York.)	1926	Nonsectarian	16,958 (Note: Combined enrollment of the Brooklyn and Post campuses. All LIU varsity sports are open to undergraduates at either campus who meet NCAA eligibility requirements.)	$367.0	Sharks	1981	
Mercyhurst University	Erie, Pennsylvania	1926	Catholic (Sisters of Mercy)	2,759	$31.8	Lakers	2024	
University of New Haven	West Haven, Connecticut	1920	Nonsectarian	7,513	$94.0	Chargers	2025	
Stonehill College	Easton, Massachusetts	1948	Catholic (Holy Cross)	2,479	$295.3 (Note: Current accurate amount in endowment is $295,259,814.)	Skyhawks	2022	
Wagner College	Staten Island, New York	1883	Lutheran	1,762	$112.0	Seahawks	1981	

==== Former full members ====
Institution	Location	Founded	Type	Nickname	Joined (Note: Represents the calendar year when fall sports competition begins.)	Left (Note: Represents the calendar year when spring sports competition ends.)	Colors	Current conference
University of Baltimore	Baltimore, Maryland	1925	Public	Super Bees	1981	1983		N/A (Note: The University of Baltimore dropped its intercollegiate athletics program at the end of the 1982–83 academic year.)
Bryant University	Smithfield, Rhode Island	1863	Nonsectarian	Bulldogs	2008	2022		America East (AmEast)
Loyola College (Note: Known as Loyola University Maryland since August 2009.)	Baltimore, Maryland	1852	Catholic (Jesuit)	Greyhounds	1981	1989		Patriot
Marist College (Note: Known as Marist University since January 2025.)	Poughkeepsie, New York (Note: The Marist campus is in the town of Poughkeepsie, not the city of the same name.)	1929	Nonsectarian (Note: Marist has been governed independently of the Catholic Church since 1969, but officially remained a Catholic institution throughout its NEC tenure. In May 2003, the Archdiocese of New York declared Marist to no longer be a Catholic institution.)	Red Foxes	1981	1997		Metro
University of Maryland, Baltimore County (UMBC)	Catonsville, Maryland (Note: Mailing address is Baltimore.)	1966	Public	Retrievers	1998	2003		America East (AmEast)
Merrimack College (Note: Merrimack and Sacred Heart remain in the NEC as affiliate members for field hockey.)	North Andover, Massachusetts	1947	Catholic (Augustinian)	Warriors	2019	2024		Metro
Monmouth University (Note: Monmouth returned to the NEC in 2024–25 as an affiliate member for women's bowling.)	West Long Branch, New Jersey	1933	Nonsectarian	Hawks	1985	2013		Coastal (CAA)
Mount St. Mary's University	Emmitsburg, Maryland (Note: The Mount St. Mary's campus has an Emmitsburg mailing address, but is located in unincorporated Frederick County.)	1808	Catholic (Archdiocese of Baltimore)	Mountaineers	1989	2022		Metro
Quinnipiac University (Note: Quinnipiac returned to the NEC in 2026–27 as an affiliate member for field hockey.)	Hamden, Connecticut	1929	Nonsectarian	Bobcats	1998	2013		Metro
Rider University (Note: Rider returned to the NEC in 2019–20 as an affiliate member for field hockey.)	Lawrenceville, New Jersey	1865	Nonsectarian	Broncs	1992	1997		Metro
Robert Morris University (Note: Robert Morris returned to the NEC in 2024–25 as an affiliate member for football and men's lacrosse.)	Moon Township, Pennsylvania	1921	Nonsectarian	Colonials	1981	2020		Horizon
Sacred Heart University	Fairfield, Connecticut	1963	Catholic (Diocese of Bridgeport)	Pioneers	1999	2024		Metro
St. Francis College	Brooklyn, New York	1858	Catholic (Franciscan)	Terriers	1981	2023		N/A (Note: St. Francis Brooklyn dropped its intercollegiate athletic program at the end of the 2022–23 academic year.)
Saint Francis University	Loretto, Pennsylvania	1847	Catholic (Franciscan)	Red Wolves (Note: Previously the Red Flash.)	1981	2026		Presidents (PAC) (Note: Currently an NCAA Division III athletic conference)
Siena College (Note: Known as Siena University since July 2025.)	Loudonville, New York	1937	Catholic (Franciscan)	Saints	1981	1984		Metro
Towson University	Towson, Maryland	1866	Public	Tigers	1981	1982		Coastal (CAA)

=== Affiliate members ===
==== Current affiliate members ====
Institution	Location	Founded	Type	Enrollment	Nickname	Joined (Note: Represents the calendar year when fall sports competition begins.)	Colors	NEC sport(s)	Primary conference
Binghamton University (Note: Also known as the State University of New York at Binghamton (SUNY Binghamton).)	Binghamton, New York (Note: The BU campus has a Binghamton mailing address, but mostly lies in the adjacent town of Vestal.)	1946	Public	16,098	Bearcats	2023		Men's golf	America East
Binghamton University	Binghamton, New York	1946	Public	16,098	Bearcats	2023		Men's tennis	America East
Binghamton University	Binghamton, New York	1946	Public	16,098	Bearcats	2023		Women's tennis	America East
Cleveland State University	Cleveland, Ohio	1964	Public	16,418	Vikings	2024		Men's lacrosse	Horizon
Coppin State University	Baltimore, Maryland	1900	Public (Note: Also a historically black college and university.)	2,348	Eagles	2022		Baseball	MEAC
Daemen University	Amherst, New York	1947	Private	2,156	Wildcats	2022		Men's volleyball	ECC (Note: Currently an NCAA Division II athletic conference.)
Delaware State University	Dover, Delaware	1891	Public (Note: Delaware State is officially chartered as a "privately-governed, state-assisted" institution. This status is broadly similar to that of New York State's statutory colleges, most of which are housed at Cornell University, or institutions in Pennsylvania's Commonwealth System of Higher Education.)	4,768	Hornets	2022		Baseball	MEAC
Delaware State University	Dover, Delaware	1891	Public	4,768	Hornets	2023		Women's lacrosse	MEAC
Delaware State University	Dover, Delaware	1891	Public	4,768	Hornets	2023		Women's soccer	MEAC
University of Detroit Mercy	Detroit, Michigan	1877	Private	5,700	Titans	2024		Men's lacrosse	Horizon
Duquesne University	Pittsburgh, Pennsylvania	1878	Private	10,184	Dukes	2008		Football	Atlantic 10
Duquesne University	Pittsburgh, Pennsylvania	1878	Private	10,184	Dukes	2016		Women's bowling	Atlantic 10
D'Youville University	Buffalo, New York	1946	Private	1,475	Saints	2022		Men's volleyball	ECC
Howard University	Washington, D.C.	1867	Private	10,000	Bison & Lady Bison	2020		Men's swimming & diving	MEAC
Howard University	Washington, D.C.	1867	Private	10,000	Bison & Lady Bison	2020		Women's swimming & diving	MEAC
Howard University	Washington, D.C.	1867	Private	10,000	Bison & Lady Bison	2021		Women's lacrosse	MEAC
Howard University	Washington, D.C.	1867	Private	10,000	Bison & Lady Bison	2021		Men's soccer	MEAC
Howard University	Washington, D.C.	1867	Private	10,000	Bison & Lady Bison	2021		Women's soccer	MEAC
Howard University	Washington, D.C.	1867	Private	10,000	Bison & Lady Bison	2022		Men's golf	MEAC
Manhattan University	Riverdale, New York	1853	Private	4,132	Jaspers	2025		Men's volleyball	Metro
University of Maryland Eastern Shore (UMES)	Princess Anne, Maryland (Note: The UMES campus has a Princess Anne mailing address, but lies in unincorporated Somerset County.)	1886	Public	2,888	Hawks	2022		Baseball	MEAC
University of Maryland Eastern Shore (UMES)	Princess Anne, Maryland	1886	Public	2,888	Hawks	2022		Men's golf	MEAC
University of Maryland Eastern Shore (UMES)	Princess Anne, Maryland	1886	Public	2,888	Hawks	2025		Men's volleyball	MEAC
Merrimack College	North Andover, Massachusetts	1947	Private	3,726	Warriors	2024 (Note: Merrimack was previously a full member of the NEC from 2019–20 to 2023–24.)		Field hockey	Metro
Merrimack College	North Andover, Massachusetts	1947	Private	3,726	Warriors	2026		Men's volleyball	Metro
Monmouth University	West Long Branch, New Jersey	1933	Private	5,675	Hawks	2024 (Note: Monmouth was previously a full member of the NEC from 1985–86 to 2012–13.)		Women's bowling	CAA
Niagara University	Niagara University, New York (Note: The Niagara campus is its own census-designated place and postal entity within the town of Lewiston.)	1856	Private	3,765	Purple; Eagles	2023		Women's bowling	Metro
Norfolk State University	Norfolk, Virginia	1935	Public	5,601	Spartans	2022		Baseball	MEAC
North Carolina Central University	Durham, North Carolina	1910	Public	8,011	Eagles	2022		Men's golf	MEAC
Quinnipiac University	Hamden, Connecticut	1929	Private	10,207	Bobcats	2026 (Note: Quinnipiac was previously a full member of the NEC from 1998–99 to 2012–13.)		Field hockey	Metro
Rider University	Lawrenceville, New Jersey	1865	Private	5,790	Broncs	2019 (Note: Rider was previously a full member of the NEC from 1992–93 to 1996–97; while its field hockey team had previously competed in the NEC from the 1998 to 2012 fall seasons (1998–99 to 2012–13 school years).)		Field hockey	Metro
Robert Morris University	Moon Township, Pennsylvania	1921	Private	4,895	Colonials	2024 (Note: Robert Morris was previously a full member of the NEC from 1981–82 to 2019–20.)		Football	Horizon
Robert Morris University	Moon Township, Pennsylvania	1921	Private	4,895	Colonials	2024		Men's lacrosse	Horizon
Sacred Heart University	Fairfield, Connecticut	1963	Private	5,974	Pioneers	2024 (Note: Sacred Heart was previously a full member of the NEC from 1999–2000 to 2023–24.)		Field hockey	Metro
Virginia Military Institute (VMI)	Lexington, Virginia	1839	S.M.C.	1,772	Keydets	2024		Men's lacrosse	SoCon
Virginia Military Institute (VMI)	Lexington, Virginia	1839	S.M.C.	1,772	Keydets	2026		Men's swimming and diving	SoCon
Virginia Military Institute (VMI)	Lexington, Virginia	1839	S.M.C.	1,772	Keydets	2026		Women's swimming and diving	SoCon

==== Future affiliate members ====
Institution	Location	Founded	Type	Enrollment	Nickname	Joining (Note: Represents the calendar year when fall sports competition begins.)	Colors	NEC sport(s)	Primary conference	Current conference in affiliate sport(s)
Morgan State University	Baltimore, Maryland	1867	Public (Note: Also a historically black college and university.)	10,739	Bears & Lady Bears	2027		Men's golf	MEAC	N/A

==== Former affiliate members ====
Institution	Location	Founded	Type	Nickname	Joined (Note: Represents the calendar year when fall sports competition begins.)	Left (Note: Represents the calendar year when spring sports competition ends.)	Colors	NEC sport(s)	Primary conference	Conference in former NEC sport(s)
Adelphi University	Garden City, New York	1896	Private	Panthers	2008	2015		Women's bowling	Northeast-10 (Note: Currently an NCAA Division II athletic conference.)	ECC
University at Albany (Note: Also known as the State University of New York at Albany (UAlbany or SUNY Albany).)	Albany, New York	1844	Public	Great Danes	1999	2013		Football	America East	CAA Football (Note: CAA Football is technically a separate entity from the all-sports Coastal Athletic Association, though both share the same administration.)
Caldwell University	Caldwell, New Jersey	1939	Private	Cougars	2014	2018		Women's bowling	CACC	ECC
Campbell University	Buies Creek, North Carolina	1887	Southern; Baptist	Fighting; Camels	2004	2007		Women's swimming & diving	CAA (Note: At the time of their membership in the NEC, Campbell was a full member of the Atlantic Sun Conference (ASUN). In 2011, they became full members of the Big South Conference; before joining the Coastal Athletic Association (CAA) in 2023. In swimming, the Fighting Camels left the NEC to join the now-defunct Coastal Collegiate Sports Association (CCSA); now they compete in their primary conference home.)	
Delaware State University	Dover, Delaware	1891	Public (Note: Delaware State is officially chartered as a "privately-governed, state-assisted" institution. This status is broadly similar to that of New York State's statutory colleges, most of which are housed at Cornell University, or institutions in Pennsylvania's Commonwealth System of Higher Education.) (Note: Also a historically black college and university.)	Hornets	2022	2026		Women's golf	MEAC	
Fairfield University	Fairfield, Connecticut	1942	Catholic (Jesuit)	Stags	2004, 2019	2007, 2026		Field hockey	Metro	CAA
Florida A&M University	Tallahassee, Florida	1887	Public	Rattlers	2003 (Note: The Florida A&M men's swimming program joined the NEC from 2003–04 to 2004–05 during the "Invitational" years of the sport at that time; while its women's swimming team was a varsity program during that same timeline.)	2005		Men's swimming & diving	SWAC	none (Note: Florida A&M dropped the sport at the end of the 2004–05 school year.)
Florida A&M University	Tallahassee, Florida	1887	Public	Rattlers	2003	2005		Women's swimming & diving	SWAC	none
Gardner–Webb University	Boiling Springs, North Carolina	1906	Southern; Baptist	Runnin'; Bulldogs	2003	2007		Women's swimming & diving	Big South (Note: At the time of their membership in the NEC, Georgia Southern was a full member of the Atlantic Sun Conference (ASUN). In 2008, they became full members of the Big South Conference. In swimming, the Runnin' Bulldogs left the NEC to join the now-defunct Coastal Collegiate Sports Association (CCSA); now they compete in the Atlantic Sun Conference (ASUN) since the 2023–24 school year.)	ASUN
Georgetown University	Washington, D.C.	1789	Catholic (Jesuit)	Hoyas	2003	2005		Men's swimming & diving	Big East	
Georgetown University	Washington, D.C.	1789	Catholic (Jesuit)	Hoyas	2003	2005		Women's swimming & diving	Big East	
Georgia Southern University	Statesboro, Georgia	1906	Public	Eagles	2003	2007		Women's swimming & diving	Sun Belt (Note: At the time of their membership in the NEC, Georgia Southern was a full member of the Southern Conference (SoCon). In 2014, they became full members of the Sun Belt Conference. In swimming, the Eagles left the NEC to join the now-defunct Coastal Collegiate Sports Association (CCSA), and later competed in their primary conference home until 2024–25; now they compete in the Atlantic Sun Conference (ASUN) since the 2025–26 school year.)	ASUN
Hobart College	Geneva, New York	1822	Private	Statesmen	2013	2022		Men's lacrosse	Liberty (Note: Currently an NCAA Division III athletic conference.)	Atlantic 10
Howard University	Washington, D.C.	1867	Private	Bison & Lady Bison	2021	2026		Women's golf	MEAC	
Kutztown University of Pennsylvania	Kutztown, Pennsylvania	1866	Public	Golden Bears	2008	2015		Women's bowling	PSAC	ECC
Lock Haven University of Pennsylvania (Note: Formally known as Commonwealth University-Lock Haven since March 2022, though the campus maintains "Lock Haven" as its primary public-facing name.)	Lock Haven, Pennsylvania	1942	Public	Bald Eagles	2004	2010		Field hockey	PSAC	Atlantic 10
University of Maryland Eastern Shore (UMES)	Princess Anne, Maryland (Note: The UMES campus has a Princess Anne mailing address, but lies in unincorporated Somerset County.)	1886	Public	Hawks	2022	2026		Women's golf	MEAC	
New Jersey City University (NJCU)	Jersey City, New Jersey	1929	Public	Gothic Knights	2009	2013		Women's bowling	NJAC	AMCC
New Jersey Institute of Technology (NJIT)	Newark, New Jersey	1881	Public	Highlanders	2019	2020		Men's lacrosse	America East (Note: NJIT left the NEC as an associate member for men's lacrosse after only one season when it became a full member of the America East Conference, which sponsors that sport.)	
North Carolina A&T State University (North Carolina A&T)	Greensboro, North Carolina	1891	Public (Note: Part of the University of North Carolina System.)	Aggies	2003	2007		Women's swimming & diving	CAA (Note: At the time of their membership in the NEC, North Carolina A&T was a full member of the Mid-Eastern Athletic Conference (MEAC). In 2021, they became full members of the Big South Conference; before joining the Coastal Athletic Association (CAA) in 2022. In swimming, the Aggies left the NEC to join the now-defunct Coastal Collegiate Sports Association (CCSA) before dropping the sport in 2016.)	none (Note: North Carolina A&T dropped women's swimming after the 2015–16 school year.)
North Carolina Central University	Durham, North Carolina	1910	Public	Eagles	2022	2026		Women's golf	MEAC	
Radford University	Radford, Virginia	1910	Public	Highlanders	2003	2007		Women's swimming & diving	Big South (Note: At the time of their membership in the NEC, Campbell was a full member of the Big South Conference, where they still compete today. In swimming, the Highlanders left the NEC to join the now-defunct Coastal Collegiate Sports Association (CCSA) before dropping the sport in 2014.)	none (Note: Radford dropped women's swimming after the 2013–14 school year.)
St. John's University	Queens, New York	1870	Private	Red Storm	2000	2003		Football	Big East	none (Note: St. John's dropped football after the 2002 fall season (2002–03 school year).)
Saint Joseph's University	Philadelphia, Pennsylvania	1851	Private	Hawks	2013	2022		Men's lacrosse	Atlantic 10	
Saint Peter's University	Jersey City, New Jersey	1872	Private	Peahens (Note: When Saint Peter's was an associate member of the NEC, its men's teams used the nickname Peacocks, with its women's teams using Peahens. The university has since adopted Peacocks for all teams.)	2008	2013		Women's bowling	Metro	none (Note: Saint Peter's dropped women's bowling after the 2017–18 school year.)
Siena College (Note: Currently known as Siena University since July 2025.)	Loudonville, New York	1937	Private	Saints	1998	2013		Field hockey	Metro	none (Note: Siena dropped field hockey after the 2017 fall season (2017–18 school year).)
Stony Brook University (Note: Also known as the State University of New York at Stony Brook (SUNY Stony Brook).)	Stony Brook, New York	1957	Public	Seawolves	1999	2007		Football	CAA	CAA Football
Virginia Military Institute (VMI)	Lexington, Virginia	1839	S.M.C.	Keydets	2003 (Note: The VMI men's swimming program joined the NEC from 2003–04 to 2006–07 during the "Invitational" years of the sport at that time. The women's swimming team became a varsity program during the 2005–06 school year.)	2007		Men's swimming & diving	SoCon	America East (Note: At the time of their membership in the NEC, VMI was a full member of the Big South Conference. In 2014, they became full members of the Southern Conference (SoCon). In swimming, the Keydets left the NEC to join the now-defunct Coastal Collegiate Sports Association (CCSA), and have competed in the America East Conference since the 2017–18 school year.)
Virginia Military Institute (VMI)	Lexington, Virginia	1839	S.M.C.	Keydets	2005	2007		Women's swimming & diving	SoCon	America East

=== Membership timeline ===
Full member (all sports) Full member (non-football) Associate member (football) Associate member (sport) Other Conference Other Conference

== Sports ==
The NEC currently sponsors championship competition in 11 men's and 13 women's NCAA sanctioned sports. Twelve schools are associate members in 14 of those sports.

The most recent change to the NEC sports lineup is the reinstatement of men's lacrosse in 2024–25 after it had been eliminated in 2022. At the same time men's lacrosse was dropped, the NEC added men's volleyball.

Teams in Northeast Conference competition
Sport	Men's	Women's
Baseball	11	–
Basketball	9	9
Bowling	–	8
Cross country	9	9
Field hockey	–	9
Football	8	–
Golf	11	12
Lacrosse	8	10
Soccer	9	11
Softball	–	8
Swimming & Diving	4	7
Tennis	9	9
Track and Field (Indoor)	9	9
Track and Field (Outdoor)	9	9
Volleyball	7	8

=== Men's sponsored sports by school ===
School	Baseball	Basketball	Cross Country	Football	Golf	Lacrosse	Soccer	Swimming & Diving	Tennis	Track & Field (Indoor)	Track & Field (Outdoor)	Volleyball	Total NEC Sports
Central Connecticut	Yes	Yes	Yes	Yes	No	No	Yes	No	No	Yes	Yes	No	7
Chicago State	No	Yes	Yes	No (Note: Chicago State is playing its first season of varsity football in 2026 as an FCS independent before joining NEC football in 2027.)	Yes	No	Yes	No	Yes	Yes	Yes	No	7
Fairleigh Dickinson	Yes	Yes	Yes	No	Yes	No	Yes	No	Yes	Yes	Yes	Yes	9
Le Moyne	Yes	Yes	Yes	No	Yes	Yes	Yes	Yes	Yes	Yes	Yes	No	10
LIU	Yes	Yes	Yes	Yes	Yes	Yes	Yes	Yes	Yes	Yes	Yes	Yes	12
Mercyhurst	Yes	Yes	Yes	Yes	Yes	Yes	Yes	No	Yes	Yes	Yes	No	10
New Haven	Yes	Yes	Yes	Yes	Yes	No	Yes	No	No	Yes	Yes	No	8
Stonehill	Yes	Yes	Yes	Yes	No (Note: Stonehill will add men's golf in 2027–28.)	No	Yes	Yes	Yes	Yes	Yes	No	9
Wagner	Yes	Yes	Yes	Yes	Yes	Yes	No	Yes	Yes	Yes	Yes	No	10
Totals	8+4 (Note: Affiliate members Coppin State, Delaware State, UMES, and Norfolk State)	9	9	6+2 (Note: Affiliate members Duquesne and Robert Morris)	7+4 (Note: Affiliate members Binghamton, Howard, UMES, and North Carolina Central. Morgan State becomes an affiliate in 2027.)	4+4 (Note: Affiliate members Cleveland State, Detroit Mercy, Robert Morris, and VMI)	8+1 (Note: Affiliate member Howard)	4+2 (Note: Affiliate members Howard and VMI)	7+1 (Note: Affiliate member Binghamton)	9	9	2+5 (Note: Affiliate members Daemen, D'Youville, Manhattan, Merrimack, and UMES.)	82+23

Notes

Men's varsity sports not sponsored by the Northeast Conference which are played by NEC schools:

School	Fencing	Ice Hockey	Water Polo	Wrestling
LIU	IND	Independent	—	EIWA
Mercyhurst	—	—	CWPA	IND
Stonehill	–	Independent	–	–
Wagner	IND	—	CWPA	—

=== Women's sponsored sports by school ===
School	Basketball	Bowling	Cross Country	Field Hockey	Golf	Lacrosse	Soccer	Softball	Swimming & Diving	Tennis	Track & Field (Indoor)	Track & Field (Outdoor)	Volleyball	Total NEC Sports
Central Connecticut	Yes	No	Yes	No	No	Yes	Yes	Yes	Yes	No	Yes	Yes	Yes	9
Chicago State	Yes	No	Yes	No	Yes	No	Yes	No	No	Yes	Yes	Yes	Yes	8
Fairleigh Dickinson	Yes	Yes	Yes	No	Yes	Yes	Yes	Yes	No	Yes	Yes	Yes	Yes	11
Le Moyne	Yes	Yes	Yes	No	Yes	Yes	Yes	Yes	Yes	Yes	Yes	Yes	Yes	12
LIU	Yes	Yes	Yes	Yes	Yes	Yes	Yes	Yes	Yes	Yes	Yes	Yes	Yes	13
Mercyhurst	Yes	Yes	Yes	Yes	Yes	Yes	Yes	Yes	No	Yes	Yes	Yes	Yes	12
New Haven	Yes	No	Yes	Yes	Yes	Yes	Yes	Yes	No	Yes	Yes	Yes	Yes	11
Stonehill	Yes	No	Yes	Yes	Yes	Yes	Yes	Yes	Yes	Yes	Yes	Yes	Yes	12
Wagner	Yes	Yes	Yes	Yes	Yes	Yes	Yes	Yes	Yes	Yes	Yes	Yes	No	12
Totals	9	5+3 (Note: Affiliate members Duquesne, Monmouth, and Niagara.)	9	5+4 (Note: Affiliate members Merrimack, Quinnipiac, Rider, and Sacred Heart.)	8	8+2 (Note: Affiliate members Delaware State and Howard.)	9+2	8	5+2 (Note: Affiliate members Howard and VMI.)	8+1 (Note: Affiliate member Binghamton.)	9	9	8	100+14

Notes

Women's varsity sports not sponsored by the Northeast Conference which are played by NEC schools:

School	Acrobatics & Tumbling (Note: Graduated from the NCAA Emerging Sports for Women program in January 2026. The first NCAA championship will be held in 2026–27.)	Equestrian (Note: Part of the NCAA Emerging Sports for Women program.)	Fencing	Gymnastics	Ice Hockey	Rowing	Rugby	Stunt	Triathlon	Water Polo	Wrestling
Chicago State	—	—	—	—	—	—	—	—	IND (Note: The NCAA considers all triathlon schools that do not compete in the sport within a recognized NCAA conference to be independents.)	—	—
Fairleigh Dickinson	—	—	NIWFA	—	—	—	—	—	—	—	—
LIU	IND (Note: The NCAA considers all acrobatics & tumbling schools that do not compete in the sport within a recognized NCAA conference to be independents.)	—	IND	EAGL	NEWHA	Metro	—	—	—	Metro	—
Mercyhurst	—	—	—	—	AHA	IND	—	IND	—	CWPA	(Note: Mercyhurst will add women's wrestling in 2026–27. It will almost certainly be an independent in that sport, given that only six other Division I members will field varsity women's wrestling teams in 2026–27.)
New Haven	—	—	-	—	—	—	IND	—	—	—	—
Stonehill	—	IND (Note: The NCAA considers all equestrian schools that do not compete in the sport within a recognized NCAA conference to be independents.)	—	—	NEWHA	—	—	—	—	—	—
Wagner	—	—	NIWFA	—	—	—	—	—	IND	Metro	—

In addition to the above, Fairleigh Dickinson counts their female cheerleaders (but not male cheerleaders) as varsity athletes.

== Basketball champions ==
=== Men's basketball champions ===
Season	Regular season champion	Tournament champion
1982	Fairleigh Dickinson (12–3)	Robert Morris
1983	Robert Morris (12–2)	Robert Morris
1984	Long Island (11–5)	Long Island
1985	Marist (11–3)	Fairleigh Dickinson
1986	Fairleigh Dickinson (13–3)	Marist
1987	Marist (15–1)	Marist
1988	Fairleigh Dickinson (13–3)	Fairleigh Dickinson
1989	Robert Morris (12–4)	Robert Morris
1990	Robert Morris (12–4)	Robert Morris
1991	Saint Francis (PA) (13–3)	Saint Francis (PA)
1992	Robert Morris (12–4)	Robert Morris
1993	Rider (14–4)	Rider
1994	Rider (14–4)	Rider
1995	Rider (13–5)	Mount Saint Mary's
1996	Mount Saint Mary's (16–2)	Monmouth
1997	Long Island (15–3)	Long Island
1998	Long Island (14–2)	Fairleigh Dickinson
1999	UMBC (17–3)	Mount Saint Mary's
2000	Central Connecticut St. (15–3)	Central Connecticut St.
2001	St. Francis (NY) (16–4)	Monmouth
2002	Central Connecticut St. (19–1)	Central Connecticut St.
2003	Wagner (14–4)	Wagner
2004	Monmouth† and St. Francis (NY) (12–6)	Monmouth
2005	Monmouth (14–4)	Fairleigh Dickinson
2006	Fairleigh Dickinson (14–4)	Monmouth
2007	Central Connecticut St. (16–2)	Central Connecticut St.
2008	Robert Morris (16–2)	Mount Saint Mary's
2009	Robert Morris (15–3)	Robert Morris
2010	Quinnipiac (15–3)	Robert Morris
2011	Long Island (16–2)	Long Island
2012	Long Island (16–2)	Long Island
2013	Robert Morris (14–4)	Long Island
2014	Robert Morris (14–2)	Mount Saint Mary's
2015	St. Francis Brooklyn (15–3)	Robert Morris
2016	Wagner (13–5)	Fairleigh Dickinson
2017	Mount Saint Mary's (14–4)	Mount Saint Mary's
2018	Wagner (14–4)	LIU Brooklyn
2019	Saint Francis (PA)† and Fairleigh Dickinson (12–6)	Fairleigh Dickinson
2020	Merrimack (14–4) (Note: Merrimack was ineligible for the NEC tournament due to being in its first transitional year (of four) from NCAA Division II.)	Robert Morris
2021	Wagner (13–5)	Mount St. Mary's
2022	Bryant (16–2)	Bryant
2023	Merrimack (12–4)	Merrimack (Note: Starting with the 2023 edition, NEC tournament eligibility was extended to transitional D-I members effective with the third year of the transition, making fourth-year transitional member Merrimack tournament-eligible. However, it remained ineligible for the NCAA tournament. Merrimack's opponent in the NEC final, Fairleigh Dickinson, received the NEC automatic bid to the NCAA tournament.)
2024	Central Connecticut St.† and Merrimack (13–3)	Wagner
2025	Central Connecticut St. (14–2)	Saint Francis
2026	LIU (15–3)	LIU

† No. 1 seed in NEC tournament

=== Women's basketball champions ===
Year	Regular season champions	Tournament champions
1986-87	Monmouth	Monmouth
1987-88	Monmouth	Robert Morris
1988-89	Wagner	Wagner
1989-90	Mount St. Mary's	Fairleigh Dickinson
1990-91	Mount St. Mary's	Robert Morris
1991-92	Mount St. Mary's	Fairleigh Dickinson
1992-93	Fairleigh Dickinson/Mount St. Mary's	Mount St. Mary's
1993-94	Mount St. Mary's	Mount St. Mary's
1994-95	Mount St. Mary's	Mount St. Mary's
1995-96	Mount St. Mary's	Saint Francis (PA)
1996-97	Saint Francis (PA)	Saint Francis (PA)
1997-98	Saint Francis (PA)	Saint Francis (PA)
1998-99	Mount St. Mary's	Saint Francis (PA)
1999-00	Saint Francis (PA)	Saint Francis (PA)
2000-01	Mount St. Mary's	Long Island
2001-02	Saint Francis (PA)	Saint Francis (PA)
2002-03	Saint Francis (PA)	Saint Francis (PA)
2003-04	Saint Francis (PA)	Saint Francis (PA)
2004-05	Saint Francis (PA)	Saint Francis (PA)
2005-06	Sacred Heart	Sacred Heart
2006-07	Long Island, Robert Morris and Sacred Heart	Robert Morris
2007-08	Quinnipiac and Robert Morris	Robert Morris
2008-09	Sacred Heart	Sacred Heart
2009-10	Robert Morris	Saint Francis (PA)
2010-11	Saint Francis (PA)	Saint Francis (PA)
2011-12	Sacred Heart	Sacred Heart
2012-13	Quinnipiac	Quinnipiac
2013-14	Robert Morris	Robert Morris
2014-15	Bryant/Central Connecticut	St. Francis Brooklyn
2015-16	Sacred Heart	Robert Morris
2016-17	Robert Morris	Robert Morris
2017-18	Saint Francis (PA)	Saint Francis (PA)
2018–19	Robert Morris	Robert Morris
2019–20	Robert Morris	None; tournament canceled in progress due to COVID-19
2020–21	Mount St. Mary's	Mount St. Mary's
2021–22	Fairleigh Dickinson	Mount St. Mary's
2022–23	Fairleigh Dickinson	Sacred Heart
2023–24	Sacred Heart	Sacred Heart
2024–25	Fairleigh Dickinson	Fairleigh Dickinson

== Football champions ==
=== Football champions ===
- 1996 – Robert Morris/Monmouth
- 1997 – Robert Morris
- 1998 – Monmouth/Robert Morris
- 1999 – Robert Morris
- 2000 – Robert Morris
- 2001 – Sacred Heart
- 2002 – Albany
- 2003 – Monmouth/Albany
- 2004 – Monmouth/Central Connecticut
- 2005 – Stony Brook/Central Connecticut
- 2006 – Monmouth
- 2007 – Albany
- 2008 – Albany
- 2009 – Central Connecticut
- 2010 – Robert Morris/Central Connecticut
- 2011 – Albany/Duquesne
- 2012 – Wagner/Albany
- 2013 – Sacred Heart/Duquesne
- 2014 – Sacred Heart/Wagner
- 2015 – Duquesne
- 2016 – Saint Francis (PA)/Duquesne
- 2017 – Central Connecticut
- 2018 – Duquesne/Sacred Heart
- 2019 - Central Connecticut
- 2020 - Sacred Heart
- 2021 - Sacred Heart
- 2022 - Saint Francis (PA)
- 2023 - Duquesne
- 2024 - Central Connecticut/Duquesne
- 2025 - Central Connecticut

=== Most conference championships ===
- 8 – Central Connecticut (4 shared)
- 7 – Duquesne (5 shared)
- 6 – Albany (3 shared)
- 6 – Robert Morris (3 shared)
- 6 – Sacred Heart (3 shared)
- 5 – Monmouth (4 shared)
- 2 – Saint Francis (PA) (1 shared)
- 2 – Wagner (2 shared)
- 1 – Stony Brook (1 shared)

== Baseball champions ==
The NEC has held a tournament for baseball since 1993.

Season	Regular season champion	Season	Tournament champion
1987	Fairleigh Dickinson		
1988	Fairleigh Dickinson		
1989	Monmouth		
1990	Long Island Brooklyn		
1991	Monmouth		
1992	St. Francis (NY)		
1993	Fairleigh Dickinson	1993	St. Francis (NY)
1994	Rider/Fairleigh Dickinson	1994	Rider
1995	Rider	1995	Rider
1996	Monmouth/Rider	1996	Rider
1997	Marist	1997	Marist
1998	St. Francis (NY)/Monmouth	1998	Monmouth
1999	FDU (North Division); Monmouth (South Division)	1999	Monmouth
2000	Long Island Brooklyn (North Division); UMBC (South Division)	2000	Wagner
2001	CCSU/St. Francis (NY) (North Division); Monmouth/UMBC (South Division)	2001	UMBC
2002	Monmouth	2002	Central Connecticut State
2003	Central Connecticut State	2003	Central Connecticut State
2004	Central Connecticut State	2004	Central Connecticut State
2005	Quinnipiac	2005	Quinnipiac
2006	Central Connecticut State	2006	Sacred Heart
2007	Quinnipiac/Mt. St. Mary's	2007	Monmouth
2008	Monmouth	2008	Mount St. Mary's
2009	Wagner	2009	Monmouth
2010	Bryant	2010	Central Connecticut State
2011	Monmouth	2011	Sacred Heart
2012	Bryant	2012	Sacred Heart
2013	Bryant	2013	Bryant
2014	Bryant	2014	Bryant
2015	Bryant	2015	Sacred Heart
2016	Bryant	2016	Bryant
2017	Bryant	2017	Central Connecticut State
2018	Bryant	2018	LIU Brooklyn
2019	Bryant	2019	Central Connecticut State
2021	Bryant	2021	Central Connecticut State
2022	Long Island	2022	Long Island
2023	Central Connecticut State	2023	Central Connecticut State
2024	Sacred Heart	2024	Long Island
2025	Long Island	2025	Central Connecticut State

== NEC rivalries ==
Before the 2013 departure of Monmouth and Quinnipiac, the NEC had 6 rivalry matchups in the conference; which is most prevalent during NEC's men's and women's basketball "Rivalry Week." The concept of playing back-to-back games against a local rival the same week is the only one of its kind among the nation's 31 NCAA Division I conferences. The pre-2013 NEC rivalries are as follows (with the current NEC team listed first in the matchups that are now non-conference):

Non-conference

- Constitution State Rivalry: Central Connecticut vs. Sacred Heart (non-conference starting in 2024–25)
- Garden State Rivalry: Fairleigh Dickinson vs. Monmouth (non-conference since 2013–14)
- Governor's Cup: Sacred Heart vs. Quinnipiac (non-conference since 2013–14, MAAC rivalry in 2024–25)
- Keystone Clash: Saint Francis (PA) vs. Robert Morris (non-conference since 2020–21, will be discontinued in 2026–27)
- NY–MD Showdown: Wagner vs. Mount St. Mary's (non-conference since 2022–23)

Discontinued

- Battle of Brooklyn: LIU vs. St. Francis Brooklyn (St. Francis Brooklyn dropped athletics after the 2022–23 academic year.)

== Brenda Weare Commissioner's Cup ==
The NEC Commissioner's Cup was instituted during the 1986–87 season with Long Island winning the inaugural award. Cup points are awarded in each NEC sponsored sport. For men's and women's basketball, men's and women's soccer, women's volleyball, football, women's bowling, softball, men's and women's lacrosse, and baseball, the final regular season standings are used to determine Cup points. Starting with the 2012–13 season, the Conference began awarding three bonus points to the NEC Tournament champion in those sports. In all other sports, points are awarded based on the finish at NEC Championship events.

Year	Overall	Men's	Women's
2025–26	LIU	LIU	Fairleigh Dickinson
2024–25	LIU	LIU	Saint Francis (PA)
2023–24	Sacred Heart	Merrimack	Sacred Heart
2022-23	Sacred Heart	Merrimack	Sacred Heart
2021-22	LIU	LIU	LIU
2020-21	LIU	Bryant	LIU
2019-20	Not Awarded	Not Awarded	Not Awarded
2018-19	Sacred Heart	Bryant	Sacred Heart
2017-18	Saint Francis (PA)	Bryant	Saint Francis (PA)
2016-17	Sacred Heart	Bryant	Sacred Heart
2015-16	Sacred Heart	Bryant	Sacred Heart
2014-15	Bryant	Bryant	Sacred Heart
2013-14	Bryant	Bryant	Saint Francis (PA)
2012-13	Monmouth	Monmouth	Saint Francis (PA)
2011-12	Sacred Heart	Monmouth	Sacred Heart
2010-11	Sacred Heart	Sacred Heart	Sacred Heart
2009-10	Sacred Heart	Monmouth	Sacred Heart
2008-09	Sacred Heart	Sacred Heart	Sacred Heart
2007-08	Sacred Heart	Monmouth	Sacred Heart
2006-07	Monmouth	Monmouth	Sacred Heart
2005-06	Monmouth	Monmouth	Long Island
2004-05	Monmouth	Monmouth	Saint Francis (PA)
2003-04	Monmouth	Monmouth	Sacred Heart
2002-03	UMBC	Monmouth	UMBC
2001-02	UMBC	Monmouth	UMBC
2000-01	UMBC	UMBC	UMBC
1999-2000	UMBC	UMBC	UMBC
1998-99	UMBC	Monmouth	UMBC
1997-98	Monmouth		
1996-97	Mount St. Mary's		
1995-96	Mount St. Mary's		
1994-95	Mount St. Mary's		
1993-94	Fairleigh Dickinson		
1992-93	Fairleigh Dickinson		
1991-92	Fairleigh Dickinson		
1990-91	Monmouth		
1989-90	Fairleigh Dickinson		
1988-89	Fairleigh Dickinson		
1987-88	Fairleigh Dickinson		
1986-87	Long Island		

== Facilities ==
School	Football stadium	Capacity	Basketball arena	Capacity	Baseball stadium	Capacity
Central Connecticut	Arute Field	5,500	William H. Detrick Gymnasium	3,200	CCSU Baseball Field	—N/a
Chicago State	SeatGeek Stadium	20,000	Jones Convocation Center	7,000	Non-baseball school	
Duquesne	Arthur J. Rooney Athletic Field	2,200	Football (and bowling)-only member			
Fairleigh Dickinson	Non-football school		Bogota Savings Bank Center	5,000	Naimoli Family Baseball Complex	500
Le Moyne	Non-football school		Ted Grant Court	2,637	Dick Rockwell Field	—N/a
LIU	Bethpage Federal Credit Union Stadium	6,000	Steinberg Wellness Center	3,000	LIU Baseball Stadium	—N/a
Mercyhurst	Saxon Stadium	2,300	Mercyhurst Athletic Center	1,800	Mercyhurst Baseball Field	1,000
New Haven	Ralph F. DellaCamera Stadium	3,500	Jeffrey P. Hazell Athletics Center	1,500	Frank Vieira Field	—N/a
Robert Morris	Joe Walton Stadium	3,000	Football (and men's lacrosse)-only member			
Stonehill	W.B. Mason Stadium	2,400	Merkert Gymnasium	1,560	Lou Gorman Field	—N/a
Wagner	Wagner College Stadium	3,500	Spiro Sports Center	2,500	SIUH Community Park	7,171

Baseball affiliates
School	Stadium	Capacity
Coppin State	Joe Cannon Stadium	1,500
Delaware State	Soldier Field	500
Maryland Eastern Shore	Hawk Stadium	1,000
Norfolk State	Marty L. Miller Field	1,500

== Streaming platform ==
The NEC launched its own streaming platform branded as NEC Front Row in 2012. Most events hosted by NEC teams are available on the platform live or on demand free of charge. Other content such as highlight reels and coaches' shows are also available. NEC Front Row can be accessed via a web browser at necfrontrow.com or through the NEC On the Run app on mobile devices and smart TVs.
