= Jim Koerner =

American baseball player (born 1975)

Biographical details
- Born: February 23, 1975 (age 51); Buffalo, New York, U.S.

Playing career
- 1994–1997: St. John Fisher College
- 1998: Richmond Roosters
- Position: Outfielder

Coaching career (HC unless noted)
- 2001–2003: Medaille College
- 2004: Monmouth (asst.)
- 2005–2006: Marshall (asst.)
- 2007–2011: Buffalo (asst.)
- 2012–2021: North Carolina Central

Head coaching record
- Overall: 236–326–1
- Tournaments: MEAC: 7–10; NCAA: 0–0

Accomplishments and honors

Awards
- "Doc" Councilman Science Award (2021); MEAC Coach of the Year (2021); NEAC Coach of the Year (2003)

James A. Koerner (born February 23, 1975) is an American college baseball coach and former outfielder. Koerner was the head baseball coach of the North Carolina Central Eagles (2012–2021).

== Playing career ==
Koerner played baseball for St. John Fisher College from 1994 to 1997 as an outfielder.

Following graduation, Koerner signed with the Richmond Roosters of the Frontier League.

== Coaching career ==
Koerner began his coaching career as the head coach for the Medaille College Mavericks baseball team, where he helped found the program. He compiled a 23–62 record in three seasons. While at Medaille, Koerner helped develop the schools first ever North Eastern Athletic Conference Co-Player of the Year. Koerner then left the Mavericks to become an assistant for the Monmouth Hawks baseball program. After just a single season at Monmouth, he accepted a position as an assistant and the recruiting coordinator for the Marshall Thundering Herd baseball team. Koerner then accepted the same position for the Buffalo Bulls baseball program.

On June 16, 2011, Koerner was named the head coach of the North Carolina Central Eagles baseball team.

On April 13, 2021, Koerner was hired by USA Baseball as Director of Player Development.

== Head coaching record ==
Record table
Season	Team	Overall	Conference	Standing	Postseason
Medaille Mavericks (North Eastern Athletic Conference) (2001–2003)
2001	Medaille	4–23			
2002	Medaille	2–22			
2003	Medaille	17–17	7–5	2nd	NEAC Tournament
Medaille:		23–62	7–5	→←	
North Carolina Central Eagles (Mid-Eastern Athletic Conference) (2012–2021)
2012	North Carolina Central	19–32	13–10	2nd (Southern)	MEAC Tournament
2013	North Carolina Central	27–29	12–12	3rd (Southern)	MEAC Tournament
2014	North Carolina Central	19–33–1	12–12	3rd (Southern)	MEAC Tournament
2015	North Carolina Central	19–30	12–12	4th (Southern)	
2016	North Carolina Central	25–30	11–13	3rd (Southern)	MEAC Tournament
2017	North Carolina Central	22–28	12–11	4th (Southern)	
2018	North Carolina Central	28–24	11–13	4th (Southern)	
2019	North Carolina Central	21–28	10–14	T-3rd (Southern)	
2020	North Carolina Central	6–11	0–0		Season canceled due to COVID-19
2021	North Carolina Central	27–20	17–11	1st (South)	MEAC Tournament
North Carolina Central:		214–264–1	110–108		
Total:		236–326–1			
National champion Postseason invitational champion Conference regular season champion Conference regular season and conference tournament champion Division regular season champion Division regular season and conference tournament champion Conference tournament champion
