= 2015 Florida A&M Rattlers baseball team =

American college baseball season

2015 Florida A&M Rattlers baseball
- Conference: Mid-Eastern Athletic Conference
- Record: 17-22 (13-8 MEAC)
- Head coach: Jamey Shouppe (2nd Year)
- Assistant coaches: Bryan Henry; Brett Richardson

2015 Mid-Eastern Athletic Conference baseball standings
	Conf.						Overall
Team	W		L		T	PCT	W		L		T	PCT
Northern
Norfolk State ^{x}‍‍‍	19	–	5	–	0	.792	27	–	16	–	0	.628
Maryland Eastern Shore ‍‍‍	14	–	10	–	0	.583	16	–	33	–	0	.327
Delaware State ‍‍‍	13	–	11	–	0	.542	16	–	29	–	0	.356
Coppin State ‍‍‍	2	–	22	–	0	.083	3	–	38	–	2	.093
Southern
Florida A&M ^{x}‍‍‡‍^{y}	15	–	9	–	0	.625	23	–	23	–	0	.500
Bethune-Cookman ‍‍‍	14	–	10	–	0	.583	19	–	40	–	0	.322
Savannah State ‍‍‍	12	–	12	–	0	.500	21	–	33	–	0	.389
North Carolina Central ‍‍‍	12	–	12	–	0	.500	19	–	30	–	0	.388
North Carolina A&T ‍‍‍	7	–	17	–	0	.292	10	–	36	–	0	.217
x – Division champion ‡ – Tournament champion y – Invited to the NCAA tournament As of 22:06, 25 May 2015 (UTC); Rankings from Collegiate Baseball

The 2015 Florida A&M Rattlers baseball team represented Florida A&M University in the sport of baseball during the 2015 college baseball season. The Rattlers competed in Division I of the National Collegiate Athletic Association (NCAA) and the Southern Division of the Mid-Eastern Athletic Conference (MEAC). The team was coached by Jamey Shouppe, who entered his second season at Florida A&M. The Rattlers looked to build upon their appearance in the 2014 MEAC baseball tournament, where they made it to the semi-finals before being eliminated by Norfolk State.

== Roster ==
2015 Florida A&M Rattlers roster
Pitchers: 29 - Ryan Anderson - Freshman; 9 - Alex Carrasco - Junior; 55 - Hunter Fillingim - Junior; 17 - Brandon Fleming - Junior; 12 - Chase Jarrell - Sophomore; 11 - Ryan Kopenski - Junior; 14 - Kenny McDonald - Junior; 44 - David Ogilvie - Junior; 19 - Ricky Page - Junior; 50 - Timothy Reker - Junior; 4 - Marcus Roberts - Senior; 24 - Cameron Sims - Junior; 20 - Cleveland Westbrook - Freshman	Catchers: 15 - Jeremy Barlow - Senior; 23 - Javon Byrd - Freshman; 28 - Garrett Johnson - (redshirt) Sophomore; 18 - Robby Jolley - Junior; Infielders: 32 - Michael Birdsong - Senior; 1 - Bryan Davis - Freshman; 6 - AJ Elkins - Junior; 3 - Ryan Hutson - Senior; 33 - Ryan Kennedy - Senior; 10 - Taylor Strauss - Sophomore; 13 - Alec Wong - Junior; 2 - Kendal Weeks - Junior	Outfielders: 42 - Marlon Gibbs - Senior; 16 - Shane Gordon - Junior; 27 - Peter Jackson - Junior; 21 - Cameron Johnson - Freshman; 30 - Dexter Martin - Freshman; 7 - Logan Seymour - Sophomore; 25 - Rodney Woodbury - Sophomore

== Schedule ==
Regular Season
Date	Opponent	Rank	Site/stadium	Score	Win	Loss	Save	Attendance	Overall record	MEAC Record
February 13	Marshall		Tallahassee, Fla.	4–3	Fleming (1–0)	Ross (0–1)	McDonald (1)	213	1–0	
February 14	Marshall		Tallahassee, Fla.	2–24	Boster (1–0)	Carrasco (0–1)		176	1–1	
February 15	Marshall		Tallahassee, Fla.	9–10	Stanley (1–0)	Ogilvie (0–1)	Guerrero (1)	149	1–2	
February 17	Florida		Gainesville, Fla.	Postponed						
February 21	Alabama State		Montgomery, Al.	3–11	Renda (1–1)	Jarrell (0–1)		131	1–3	
February 21	Alabama State		Montgomery, Al.	1–7	Camacho (2–0)	Carrasco (0–2)		131	1–4	
February 22	Alabama State		Montgomery, Al.	Postponed						
February 24	Mercer		Macon, Ga.	2–10	Papelian (1–1)	Weeks (0–1)		102	1–5	
February 25	Mercer		Macon, Ga.	Postponed						
February 28	Bethune-Cookman		Daytona Beach, Fla.	2–1	Jarell (1–1)	Griffey (0–2)	McDonald (2)	41	2–5	1-0
March 1	Bethune-Cookman		Dayton Beach, Fla.	2–6	Zuniga (1–1)	Carrasco (0–3)			2–6	1-1
March 1	Bethune-Cookman		Dayton Beach, Fla.	6–0 (16 innings)	Fleming (2–0)	Austin (0–1)		251	3–6	2-1
March 3	Jacksonville		Jacksonville, Fla.	5–1	Weeks (1–1)	Wise (0–1)	Anderson (1)	156	4–6	
March 7	Savannah State		Tallahassee, Fla.	3–2	Westbrook (1–0)	Davis (0–2)	McDonald (3)	212	5–6	3-1
March 7	Savannah State		Tallahassee, Fla.	5–7	Robinson (2–0)	Ogilvie (0–2)	Miller (1)	212	5–7	3-2
March 8	Savannah State		Tallahassee, Fla.	5–4	McDonald (2–0)	Mirabal (0–2)		179	6–7	4-2
March 10	Mercer		Tallahassee, Fla.	14–2	Weeks (2–1)	Askew (2–2)		148	7–7	
March 11	Mercer		Tallahassee, Fla.	5–11	Pittman (1–0)	Kopenski (0–1)		124	7–8	
March 13	South Florida		Tampa, Fla.	5–10	Herget (4–0)	Ogilvie (0–3)		657	7–9	
March 14	South Florida		Tampa, Fla.	1–4	Mulholland (3–2)	Jarrell (1–2)	Peterson (6)	774	7–10	
March 15	South Florida		Tampa, Fla.	0–5	Cavallaro (3–0)	Anderson (0–1)		712	7–11	
March 17	Georgia State		Atlanta, Ga.	11–12 (11)	Wages (2–0)	Carrasco (0–4)		200	7–12	
March 21	North Carolina Central		Durham, Nc.	1–4	Quinn (2–3)	Jarrell (1–3)	Vernon (3)	79	7–13	4-3
March 21	North Carolina Central		Durham, Nc.	1–6	Dandridge (3–0)	Anderson (0–2)		79	7–14	4-4
March 22	North Carolina Central		Durham, Nc.	0–7	Sweet (2–1)	Weeks (2–2)		83	7–15	4-5
March 25	Troy		Tallahassee, Fla.	2–1	Fleming (3–0)	Childress (2–3)	McDonald (4)	148	8–15	
March 28	North Carolina A&T		Tallahassee, Fla.	10–7	Westbrook (2–0)	Gifford (0–1)	McDonald (5)	139	9–15	5-5
March 28	North Carolina A&T		Tallahassee, Fla.	3–2	McDonald (2–0)	Liang (0–4)		139	10–15	6-5
March 29	North Carolina A&T		Tallahassee, Fla.	8–3	Weeks (3–2)	Thompson (0–1)		151	11–15	7-5
March 31	Jacksonville		Tallahassee, Fla.	4–10	Wise (1–1)	Ogilvie (1–4)		119	11–16	
April 3	Bethune-Cookman		Tallahassee, Fla.	1–4	Zuniga (4–3)	Jarrell (1–4)	Clymer (5)	229	11–17	7-6
April 4	Bethune-Cookman		Tallahassee, Fla.	3–2	Westbrook (3–0)	Hernandez (0–1)		141	12–17	8-6
April 4	Bethune-Cookman		Tallahassee, Fla.	2–3	Norris (3–1)	Anderson (0–3)	Clymer (6)	141	12–18	8-7
April 8	North Florida		Tallahassee, Fla.	4–5	Smith (4–1)	Westbrook (3–1)	Olmstead (5)	131	12–19	
April 12	Savannah State		Savannah, Ga.	9–4	Fleming (4–0)	Denny (3–2)		130	13–19	9-7
April 12	Savannah State		Savannah, Ga.	3–2	McDonald (3–0)	Chandler (0–3)		130	14–19	10-7
April 13	Savannah State		Savannah, Ga.	3–9	Gillis (1–0)	Fleming (4–1)		75	14–20	10-8
April 14	North Florida		Jacksonville, Fla.	3–13	Drury (1–0)	Ogilvie (0–5)		314	14–21	
April 17	Texas Southern		New Orleans, La.	Cancelled						
April 18	Texas Southern		New Orleans, La.	Cancelled						
April 18	Texas Southern		New Orleans, La.	Cancelled						
April 21	Auburn		Auburn, Ala.	2–3	Milliman (2–0)	McDonald (3–1)	Camp (6)	1473	14–22	
April 24	North Carolina Central		Pawtucket, Ri.	6–3	Roberts (1–0)	Scalzo (2–1)	McDonald (6)	113	15–22	11-8
April 24	North Carolina Central		Pawtucket, Ri.	3–1	Fleming (5–1)	Dandridge (4–2)	Carrasco (1)	113	16–22	12-8
April 25	North Carolina Central		Boston, Ma.	9–4	Fleming (6–1)	Shields (2–4)		3117	17–22	13-8
