= List of colleges and universities in Buffalo, New York =

The following is a list of public and private colleges and universities in Buffalo, New York.

== Public colleges and universities ==
Buffalo is home to three State University of New York (SUNY) institutions. University at Buffalo (SUNY Buffalo) is the largest SUNY institution, and Buffalo State University (formerly Buffalo State College) and Erie Community College also serve the area. The total enrollment of the three institutions combined is approximately 54,000 students.

Name	County	Date Founded	Endowment	Students
Buffalo State University	Erie	1871	$52.9 million (2019)	8,658
Erie Community College	Erie	1946	-	10,031
University at Buffalo	Erie	1846	$797.9 million (2019)	31,923

=== Facts ===
- University at Buffalo is a nationally ranked tier 1 research university known as "Buffalo". The University at Buffalo is the flagship and one of the four University Centers in the SUNY system.
- Buffalo State University, a comprehensive 4-year college affiliated with SUNY
- Erie Community College, a 2-year community college affiliated with SUNY

== Private colleges ==
Name	County	Date Founded	Endowment	Students
Bryant & Stratton College	Erie	1854	-	1,038
Canisius University	Erie	1870	$129.2 million (2019)	3,102
D'Youville University	Erie	1908	$49.6 million (2019)	3,048
Daemen University	Erie	1947	$21.2 million (2019)	2,603
Medaille College (closed)	Erie	1937	$1.5 million (2017)	2,002
Trocaire College	Erie	1958	$1.2 million (2015)	1,322

== See also ==
- List of colleges and universities in Western New York
- List of colleges and universities in New York
