= 2013 Delaware State Hornets baseball team =

American college baseball season

2013 Delaware State Hornets baseball

MEAC Northern Division Champion

MEAC Tournament, 0-2
- Conference: Mid-Eastern Athletic Conference
- Record: 31-13 (20-3 MEAC)
- Head coach: J. P. Blandin (13th Year)
- Assistant coach: Russ Steinhorn (2nd Year)

2013 Mid-Eastern Athletic Conference baseball standings
	Conf.				Overall
Team	W		L	PCT	W		L	PCT
Northern
Delaware State ^{x}‍‍‍	21	–	3	.875	32	–	16	.667
Norfolk State ‍‍‍	13	–	13	.500	20	–	31	.392
Coppin State ‍‍‍	12	–	14	.462	19	–	34	.358
Maryland Eastern Shore ‍‍‍	4	–	20	.167	8	–	45	.151
Southern
Savannah State ^{x}‍‍‡‍^{y}	17	–	7	.708	33	–	22	.600
Bethune–Cookman ^{x}‍‍‍	17	–	7	.708	34	–	25	.576
North Carolina Central ‍‍‍	12	–	12	.500	28	–	28	.500
North Carolina A&T ‍‍‍	8	–	16	.333	16	–	37	.302
Florida A&M ‍‍‍	6	–	18	.250	7	–	47	.130
x – Division champion ‡ – Tournament champion y – Invited to the NCAA tournament As of May 16, 2013; Rankings from Collegiate Baseball

The 2013 Delaware State Hornets baseball team represented Delaware State University in the sport of baseball during the 2013 college baseball season. The Hornets competed in NCAA Division I and the Eastern Division of the Mid-Eastern Athletic Conference (MEAC). The team was coached by J. P. Blandin, who finished his thirteenth season at Delaware State The Hornets looked to build upon their appearance in the 2012 MEAC Baseball Tournament Championship, where they were eliminated after losing in the final game against Bethune–Cookman.

== Departures ==
Delaware State lost 3 players due to graduation, and some players who decided to leave the team.

Name	Position	Reason for departure
Tommy Dill	RHP	Unknown
Scott Davis	INF	Graduation
Troy Drummond	INF/OF	Graduation
Kevin Guthrie	OF	Unknown
Tony Gatto	C	Graduation
Josh Patman	LHP	Unknown
Darien Percell	OF	Unknown

== Roster ==
2013 Delaware State Hornets baseball team
Players
Coaches

#	Pos.	Name	B/T	Height	Weight	Year	Home town
26	LHP	Zach Adkins	L/L	5 ft 10 in (1.78 m)	180 lb (82 kg)	Sr	Laurel, Del.
19	OF	Justin Allen	L/L	6 ft 0 in (1.83 m)	175 lb (79 kg)	Jr	Laurel, Del.
10	OF	Nick Arrue	R/R	5 ft 10 in (1.78 m)	170 lb (77 kg)	So	Jersey City, N.J.
7	INF	Joey Babuca	R/R	5 ft 11 in (1.8 m)	195 lb (88 kg)	Sr	Camden, Del.
11	C	Peter Broehl	R/R	5 ft 11 in (1.8 m)	180 lb (82 kg)	Sr	Newark, Del.
20	OF	Bobby Brown	R/R	5 ft 8 in (1.73 m)	150 lb (68 kg)	So	Dover, Del.
40	RHP	Zach Candeloro	R/R	6 ft 4 in (1.93 m)	220 lb (100 kg)	So	Dover, Del.
5	INF	Cameron Cecil	R/R	5 ft 9 in (1.75 m)	180 lb (82 kg)	Jr	Gloucester, Va
14	RHP	Tommy Dill	R/R	5 ft 10 in (1.78 m)	180 lb (82 kg)	Jr	Felton, Del.
6	INF	JP Frey	R/R	6 ft 1 in (1.85 m)	185 lb (84 kg)	Sr	Erie, Pa
21	OF	Elliott Gardner	R/R	6 ft 2 in (1.88 m)	185 lb (84 kg)	Sr	Middletown, Del.
24	OF	Kevin Gurthrie	R/R	5 ft 8 in (1.73 m)	175 lb (79 kg)	So	Georgetown, Del.
13	INF	Ryan Haas	L/L	6 ft 0 in (1.83 m)	200 lb (91 kg)	Sr	Bear, Del.
25	RHP	Derek Marshalsea	R/R	6 ft 2 in (1.88 m)	180 lb (82 kg)	Sr	Newark, Del.
23	RHP	Matt McClain	R/R	6 ft 2 in (1.88 m)	180 lb (82 kg)	Jr	Dover, Del.
8	INF	DJ Miller	R/R	6 ft 0 in (1.83 m)	170 lb (77 kg)	Jr	Wilmington, Del.
30	OF	Aaron Nardone	L/R	6 ft 0 in (1.83 m)	185 lb (84 kg)	Jr	Chesapeake, Va
22	C	Eddie Sorondo	R/R	6 ft 0 in (1.83 m)	190 lb (86 kg)	Jr	Jersey City, N.J.
27	C	Chad Sturgeon	R/R	6 ft 5 in (1.96 m)	185 lb (84 kg)	Sr	Seaford, Del.
35	C	Mike Alexander	R/R	5 ft 10 in (1.78 m)	180 lb (82 kg)	Jr	New Castle, Del.
24	OF	Hassan Evans	R/R	6 ft 3 in (1.91 m)	210 lb (95 kg)	Jr	Brooklyn, New York
2	RHP	George Michael	R/R	5 ft 10 in (1.78 m)	160 lb (73 kg)	Fr	Milford, Delaware
34	RHP	Jordan Elliott (redshirt)	R/R	6 ft 3 in (1.91 m)	185 lb (84 kg)	RS Sr	Lincoln, Del.
28	INF	Mitchell Moore	R/R	6 ft 0 in (1.83 m)	195 lb (88 kg)	Fr	Dover, Delaware
14	INF	Cameron Onderko	R/R	5 ft 9 in (1.75 m)	165 lb (75 kg)	Fr	McKeesport, Pennsylvania
12	INF	Chris Rivera	R/R	5 ft 6 in (1.68 m)	150 lb (68 kg)	Fr	Lincoln, Delaware

Head coach

J. P. Blandin

Assistant coach(es)

Russ Steinhorn

Legend

- (C) Team captain
- (S) Suspended
- (I) Ineligible
- Injured
- Current redshirt

Roster
Last update: February 17, 2013

== Schedule ==
2012 Delaware State Hornets baseball game log
Regular Season

Date	Opponent	Rank	Site/stadium	Score	Win	Loss	Save	Attendance	Overall record	MEAC record
February 15	Charlotte		Charlotte, North Carolina	7-13	May(1–0)	Haas(0–1)			0-1	0-0
February 16	Charlotte		Charlotte, North Carolina	Cancelled						
February 16	Charlotte		Charlotte, North Carolina	Cancelled						
February 17	Charlotte		Charlotte, North Carolina	Cancelled						
February 21	Winthrop		Rock Hill, South Carolina	2-3	Pierpont(1–0)	Marshallsea (0–1)	Ruth(1)	227	0-2	0-0
February 22	Winthrop		Rock Hill, South Carolina	Cancelled						
February 23	Winthrop		Rock Hill, South Carolina	5-0	McClain (1–0)	Klitsch (0–1)	none	407	1-2	0-0
February 24	Army		Rock Hill, South Carolina	6-5(10)	Marshallsea (1-1)	Flaherty (0–1)	none		2-2	0-0
February 25	Winthrop		Rock Hill, South Carolina	6-5	Michael (1–0)	Driver (0–2)	Haas (1)	581	3-2	0-0
February 27	North Carolina Central		Durham, North Carolina	9-6(7)	Candeloro (1–0)	Vernon (0–1)	none	110	4-2	0-0
February 27	North Carolina Central		Durham, NC	1-5	Quinn (2–0)	Brown (0–1)	none	134	4-3	0-0

March

Date	Opponent	Rank	Site/stadium	Score	Win	Loss	Save	Attendance	Overall record	MEAC record
March 1	Niagara		Dover, Del	8-1	Elliott (1–0)	Fittry (0–2)	none	48	5-3	0-0
March 2	Niagara		Dover, Del	11-16	Quinlan (1–0)	McClain (1-1)	none	53	5-4	0-0
March 3	Niagara		Dover, Del.	10-13	Lysiak (1–0)	Adkins (0–1)	Schwartz (1)	51	5-5	0-0
March 9	Saint Peter's		Dover, Del.	14-0	Elliott (2–0)	Hopf	None	117	6-5	0-0
March 9	Saint Peter's		Dover, Del.	5-1	McClain (2–1)	Yuhas	none	102	7-5	0-0
March 10	Saint Peter's		Dover, Del.	4-0	Adkins (1-1)	Mozeika	none	98	8-5	0-0
March 13	Delaware		Newark, Del.	6-4	Gardner (1–0)	Hinkle (0–2)	Michael (1)		9-5	0-0
March 13	Delaware		Newark, Del.	5-6	Richter (3–0)	Marshallsea (1–2)		200	9-6	0-0
March 16	Norfolk State		Norfolk, Virginia	9-7	Michael (2–0)	Bhatti (1–4)		152	10-6	1–0
March 16	Norfolk State		Norfolk, Virginia	8-3(11)	Marshallsea (2-2)	Morton (1-1)		152	11-6	2–0
March 17	Norfolk State		Norfolk, Virginia	6-5	Candeloro (2–0)	Jones (0–2)	Brown (1)	137	12-6	3–0
March 20	Navy		Annapolis, Maryland	10-12	Rinehart (2–1)	Michael (2–1)	Sorenson(3)	85	12-7	3–0
March 23	Coppin State		Baltimore, Maryland	3-1	Elliott (3–0)	Taylor (1–3)			13-7	4–0
March 23	Coppin State		Baltimore	7-0	McClain (3–1)	Davies (1–3)		38	14-7	5–0
March 24	Coppin State		Baltimore	8-4	Michael (3–1)	Burgess (0–2)		31	15-7	6–0
March 29	Maryland Eastern Shore		Dover, Del.	9-4	Elliott (4–0)	Lopez (1–3)	Michael (2)	97	16-7	7–0
March 30	Maryland Eastern Shore		Dover, Delaware	12-0(7)	Gardner (2–0)	Turley (1-1)		83	17-7	8–0
March 30	Maryland Eastern Shore		Dover, Delaware	17-5	McClain (4–1)	Bone (0–2)		81	18-7	9–0

April

Date	Opponent	Rank	Site/stadium	Score	Win	Loss	Save	Attendance	Overall record	MEAC record
April 2	Towson		Dover, Del.	10-7	Brown (1-1)	Garrett (0–1)	Marshallsea (1)	39	19-7	9–0
April 6	Norfolk State		Dover, Del.	3-5	Horne (2-2)	Elliott (4–1)	Bhatti (1)	108	19-8	9–1
April 6	Norfolk State		Dover, Del.	2-4	Salter (4–3)	McClain (4–2)	Morton (3)	80	19-9	9–2
April 7	Norfolk State		Dover, Del.	7-0	Gardner (3–0)	Jones (0–4)	Michael (3)	73	20-9	10–2
April 9	Saint Joseph's		Dover, Del.	1-8	Muha (1–0)	Haas (0–2)		41	20-10	10–2
April 10	Lehigh		Bethlehem, Pa.	10-8	Michael (4–1)	McNamara (0–2)		105	21-10	10–2
April 13	Coppin State		Dover, Del.	10-2	Elliott (5–1)	Taylor		57	22-10	11–2
April 14	Coppin State		Dover, Del.	12-0	Gardner (4–0)	Davies		79	23-10	12–2
April 14	Coppin State		Dover, Del.	6-0	McClain (5–2)	Burgess		81	24-10	13–2
April 17	La Salle		Philadelphia, Pa.	7-8	Christensen (5–1)	Marshallsea (2–3)		163	24-11	13–2
April 20	Maryland Eastern Shore		Princess Anne, Maryland	7-3	Elliott (6–1)	Smith (0–4)	Marshallsea (2)	79	25-11	14–2
April 20	Maryland Eastern Shore		Princess Anne, Maryland	7-4	McClain (6–2)	Turley (1–3)	Michael (4)	61	26-11	15–2
April 21	Maryland Eastern Shore		Princess Anne, Maryland	11-0	Gardner (5–0)	Bone (0–4)		68	27-11	16–2
April 24	Navy		Dover, Del.	2-7	Schoberl (3–5)	Brown (1–2)		62	27-12	16–2
April 27	Norfolk State		Norfolk, Virginia	6-1	Elliott (7–1)	Horne (4–3)	none	190	28-12	17–2
April 27	Norfolk State		Norfolk, Virginia	8-4	Michael (5–1)	Bhatti (2–6)	none		29-12	18–2
April 28	Norfolk State		Norfolk, Virginia	6-14	Applin (2–3)	Gardner (4–1)	none	154	29-13	18–3

May

Date	Opponent	Rank	Site/stadium	Score	Win	Loss	Save	Attendance	Overall record	MEAC record
May 4	Maryland Eastern Shore		Dover, Del.	5-1	Elliott (8–1)	Smith (1–5)	none	73	30-13	19–3
May 4	Maryland Eastern Shore		Dover, Del.	5-4	Michael (6–1)	Repine (1–2)	none	68	31-13	20–3
May 5	Maryland Eastern Shore		Dover, Del.	11-5	Marshallsea (3-3)	Bone (0–6)	none	89	32-13	21–3
May 8	Towson		Towson, Del.	Cancelled						
May 10	Farleigh Dickinson		Dover, Del.	6-3	Elliott (9–1)	Borelli (0–7)	Gardner (1)	69	33-13	22–3
May 11	Farleigh Dickinson		Dover, Del.	Cancelled						
May 11	Farleigh Dickinson		Dover, Del.	Cancelled						

MEAC Tournament

Date	Opponent	Rank	Site/stadium	Score	Win	Loss	Save	Attendance	Overall record	MEAC record
May 15	North Carolina A&T		Norfolk, Virginia	11-16	Boone (4-4)	Marshallsea (3–4)	none		33-14	21–3
May 16	Bethune–Cookman		Norfolk, Virginia	1-5	Durapau (9–3)	Elliott (9–2)	Dailey (11)		33-15	21–3
