= 2015 Mid-Eastern Athletic Conference baseball tournament =

- Teams: 6
- Format: Double-elimination tournament
- Finals site: Arthur W. Perdue Stadium; Salisbury, MD
- Champions: Florida A&M (1st title)
- Winning coach: Jamey Shouppe (1st title)

2015 Mid-Eastern Athletic Conference baseball standings
	Conf.						Overall
Team	W		L		T	PCT	W		L		T	PCT
Northern
Norfolk State ^{x}‍‍‍	19	–	5	–	0	.792	27	–	16	–	0	.628
Maryland Eastern Shore ‍‍‍	14	–	10	–	0	.583	16	–	33	–	0	.327
Delaware State ‍‍‍	13	–	11	–	0	.542	16	–	29	–	0	.356
Coppin State ‍‍‍	2	–	22	–	0	.083	3	–	38	–	2	.093
Southern
Florida A&M ^{x}‍‍‡‍^{y}	15	–	9	–	0	.625	23	–	23	–	0	.500
Bethune-Cookman ‍‍‍	14	–	10	–	0	.583	19	–	40	–	0	.322
Savannah State ‍‍‍	12	–	12	–	0	.500	21	–	33	–	0	.389
North Carolina Central ‍‍‍	12	–	12	–	0	.500	19	–	30	–	0	.388
North Carolina A&T ‍‍‍	7	–	17	–	0	.292	10	–	36	–	0	.217
x – Division champion ‡ – Tournament champion y – Invited to the NCAA tournament As of 22:06, 25 May 2015 (UTC); Rankings from Collegiate Baseball

The 2015 Mid-Eastern Athletic Conference baseball tournament began on May 13 and ended on May 16 at Arthur W. Perdue Stadium in Salisbury, MD. It was a six-team double elimination tournament. Florida A&M won their first tournament championship and claimed the Mid-Eastern Athletic Conference's automatic bid to the 2015 NCAA Division I baseball tournament. Runner-up Bethune-Cookman had claimed fourteen of the sixteen tournament championships, with Savannah State winning in 2013 and North Carolina A&T earning the 2005 title.

== Format and seeding ==
The top three teams in the North Division and top three finishers from the South Division were seeded one through three based on regular season divisional records, with first round matchups of the second seed from the North and the third seed from the South, the second seed from the South against the third seed from the North, with the divisional winners gaining first round byes. The first round winners advance in the winners' bracket to face regular season divisional champions in the second round, while first round losers play elimination games. The format means that one team from the North and two from the South will be left out of the field.

Savannah State earned the tiebreaker for the S3 seed over North Carolina Central.

North Division
Team	W	L	Pct	GB	Seed
Norfolk State	19	5	.792	—	N1
Maryland-Eastern Shore	14	10	.583	5	N2
Delaware State	13	11	.542	6	N3
Coppin State	2	22	.083	17	—

South Division
Team	W	L	Pct	GB	Seed
Florida A&M	15	9	.625	—	S1
Bethune-Cookman	14	10	.583	1	S2
Savannah State	12	12	.500	3	S3
North Carolina Central	12	12	.500	3	—
North Carolina A&T	7	17	.292	8	—

== Results ==
Upper round 1
S2	Bethune-Cookman	2
N3	Delaware State	6
N2	Maryland Eastern Shore	6
S3	Savannah State	8
Lower round 1
S2	Bethune-Cookman	3
S3	Savannah State	2
N2	Maryland Eastern Shore	6
N1	Norfolk State	7

Upper round 2
N3	Delaware State	13
N1	Norfolk State	11
S3	Savannah State	4
S1	Florida A&M	7
Lower round 2
S2	Bethune-Cookman	12
N1	Norfolk State	1

Upper final
N3	Delaware State	2
S1	Florida A&M	11
Lower final
N3	Delaware State	0
S2	Bethune-Cookman	13

Final
S1	Florida A&M	8
S2	Bethune-Cookman	2
