= 2012 Delaware State Hornets baseball team =

American college baseball season

2012 Delaware State Hornets baseball

MEAC Northern Division Champions
- Conference: Mid-Eastern Athletic Conference
- Record: 40-17 (22-2 MEAC)
- Head coach: J. P. Blandin (12th Year)
- Assistant coach: Russ Steinhorn (1st Year)

2012 Mid-Eastern Athletic Conference baseball standings
	Conf.						Overall
Team	W		L		T	PCT	W		L		T	PCT
Northern
Delaware State ^{x}‍‍‍	22	–	2	–	0	.917	40	–	17	–	1	.698
Norfolk State ‍‍‍	15	–	9	–	0	.625	22	–	28	–	0	.440
Maryland Eastern Shore ‍‍‍	11	–	13	–	0	.458	14	–	39	–	0	.264
Coppin State ‍‍‍	0	–	24	–	0	.000	1	–	53	–	0	.019
Southern
Bethune-Cookman ^{x}‍‍‡‍^{y}	18	–	5	–	0	.783	34	–	27	–	0	.557
North Carolina Central ‍‍‍	13	–	10	–	0	.565	19	–	32	–	0	.373
North Carolina A&T ‍‍‍	12	–	12	–	0	.500	20	–	36	–	0	.357
Savannah State ‍‍‍	11	–	13	–	0	.458	19	–	34	–	0	.358
Florida A&M ‍‍‍	5	–	19	–	0	.208	7	–	45	–	0	.135
x – Division champion ‡ – Tournament champion y – Invited to the NCAA tournament As of June 4, 2012; Rankings from Collegiate Baseball

The 2012 Delaware State Hornets baseball team represented Delaware State University in the sport of baseball during the 2012 college baseball season. The Hornets competed in Division I of the National Collegiate Athletic Association (NCAA) and the Northern Division of the Mid-Eastern Athletic Conference (MEAC). They played their home games on the university's Dover, Delaware campus. The team was coached by J. P. Blandin, who was in his twelfth season at Delaware State. The Hornets were looking to build upon their 26-29 record from the 2011 season.

The Hornets finished the regular season at 35-15 with a conference record of 22-2. The Hornets would lose in the second round to Maryland Eastern Shore, but they would then go onto the finals of the MEAC Tournament to face Bethune–Cookman. The Hornets beat the Wildcats in the first game 3-2, but were stopped 8-3 in the second game, thus ending their season.

== Roster ==
2012 Delaware State Hornets baseball team
Players
Coaches

#	Pos.	Name	B/T	Height	Weight	Year	Home town
26	LHP	Zach Adkins	L/L	5 ft 10 in (1.78 m)	180 lb (82 kg)	Jr	Laurel, Del.
19	OF	Justin Allen	L/L	6 ft 0 in (1.83 m)	175 lb (79 kg)	So	Laurel, Del.
10	OF	Nick Arrue	R/R	5 ft 10 in (1.78 m)	170 lb (77 kg)	Fr	Jersey City, N.J.
7	INF	Joey Babuca	R/R	5 ft 11 in (1.8 m)	195 lb (88 kg)	Jr	Camden, Del.
11	C	Peter Broehl	R/R	5 ft 11 in (1.8 m)	180 lb (82 kg)	Jr	Newark, Del.
20	OF	Bobby Brown	R/R	5 ft 8 in (1.73 m)	150 lb (68 kg)	Fr	Dover, Del.
40	RHP	Zach Candeloro	R/R	6 ft 4 in (1.93 m)	220 lb (100 kg)	Fr	Dover, Del.
5	INF	Cameron Cecil	R/R	5 ft 9 in (1.75 m)	180 lb (82 kg)	So	Gloucester, Va
12	INF	Scott Davis	R/R	5 ft 10 in (1.78 m)	180 lb (82 kg)	Sr	Lake Lehman, Pa
14	RHP	Tommy Dill	R/R	5 ft 10 in (1.78 m)	180 lb (82 kg)	So	Felton, Del.
1	INF	Troy Drummond	R/R	5 ft 11 in (1.8 m)	185 lb (84 kg)	Sr	Newark, Del.
24	RHP	Jordan Elliott	R/R	6 ft 3 in (1.91 m)	185 lb (84 kg)	Sr	Lincoln, Del.
6	INF	JP Frey	R/R	6 ft 1 in (1.85 m)	185 lb (84 kg)	Jr	Erie, Pa
21	OF	Elliott Gardner	R/R	6 ft 2 in (1.88 m)	185 lb (84 kg)	Jr	Middletown, Del.
17	C	Tony Gatto	R/R	6 ft 1 in (1.85 m)	205 lb (93 kg)	Sr	Dover, Del.
24	OF	Kevin Gurthrie	R/R	5 ft 8 in (1.73 m)	175 lb (79 kg)	Fr	Georgetown, Del.
13	INF	Ryan Haas	L/L	6 ft 0 in (1.83 m)	200 lb (91 kg)	Jr	Bear, Del.
25	RHP	Derek Marshalsea	R/R	6 ft 2 in (1.88 m)	180 lb (82 kg)	Jr	Newark, Del.
23	RHP	Matt McClain	R/R	6 ft 2 in (1.88 m)	180 lb (82 kg)	So	Dover, Del.
8	INF	DJ Miller	R/R	6 ft 0 in (1.83 m)	170 lb (77 kg)	So	Wilmington, Del.
30	OF	Aaron Nardone	L/R	6 ft 0 in (1.83 m)	185 lb (84 kg)	So	Chesapeake, Va
28	LHP	Josh Patman	?/L	6 ft 0 in (1.83 m)	225 lb (102 kg)	Jr	Levittown, Pa
16	OF	Darien Percell	R/R	5 ft 10 in (1.78 m)	175 lb (79 kg)	Fr	Pikesville, Md
22	C	Eddie Sorondo	R/R	6 ft 0 in (1.83 m)	190 lb (86 kg)	So	Jersey City, N.J.
27	C	Chad Sturgeon	R/R	6 ft 5 in (1.96 m)	185 lb (84 kg)	Jr	Seaford, Del.

Head coach

J. P. Blandin

Assistant coach(es)

Russ Steinhorn

Legend

- (C) Team captain
- (S) Suspended
- (I) Ineligible
- Injured
- Current redshirt

Roster
Last update: January 11, 2013

== Schedule ==
2012 Delaware State Hornets baseball game log
Regular season
MEAC Tournament

Date	Opponent	Rank	Site/stadium	Score	Win	Loss	Save	Attendance	Overall record	MEAC record
May 17	vs. (4S) Savannah State	(1)	Marty L. Miller Field	10-8	Elliott (10-2)	McGowin (6-5)	None		36-15	1–0
May 18)	vs. (3N) UMES	(1)	Marty L. Miller Field	6-7	Saca (4-2)	Gardner (2-6)	Parker (2)		36-16	1-1
May 18	vs. (2N) North Carolina Central	(1)	Marty L. Miller Field	16-2	Adkins (8-1)	Fulmer (4-4)	none		37-16	2-1
May 19	vs. (3S) North Carolina A&T	(1)	Marty L. Miller Field	4-2	Haas (4-1)	Torrellas (1-6)	Marshalsea (1)		38-16	3-1
May 19	vs. (3N) UMES	(1)	Marty L. Miller Field	7-2	Brown (2-1)	Smith (0-6)	none		39-16	4-1
May 20	vs, (1S) Bethune–Cookman	(1)	Marty L. Miller Field	3-2	Dill (3-1)	Hernandez (6-3)	Elliott (1)		40-16	5-1
May 20	vs. (1S) Bethune–Cookman	(1)	Marty L. Miller Field	3-8	Rivera (3-3)	McClain (9-4)	none		40-17	5-2
