= 2015 Bethune–Cookman Wildcats baseball team =

American college baseball season

2015 Bethune-Cookman Wildcats baseball
- Conference: Mid-Eastern Athletic Conference
- Record: 15–34 (13–8 MEAC)
- Head coach: Jason Beverlin (4th Year)
- Assistant coach: Barrett Shaft (4th Year)

2015 Mid-Eastern Athletic Conference baseball standings
	Conf.						Overall
Team	W		L		T	PCT	W		L		T	PCT
Northern
Norfolk State ^{x}‍‍‍	19	–	5	–	0	.792	27	–	16	–	0	.628
Maryland Eastern Shore ‍‍‍	14	–	10	–	0	.583	16	–	33	–	0	.327
Delaware State ‍‍‍	13	–	11	–	0	.542	16	–	29	–	0	.356
Coppin State ‍‍‍	2	–	22	–	0	.083	3	–	38	–	2	.093
Southern
Florida A&M ^{x}‍‍‡‍^{y}	15	–	9	–	0	.625	23	–	23	–	0	.500
Bethune-Cookman ‍‍‍	14	–	10	–	0	.583	19	–	40	–	0	.322
Savannah State ‍‍‍	12	–	12	–	0	.500	21	–	33	–	0	.389
North Carolina Central ‍‍‍	12	–	12	–	0	.500	19	–	30	–	0	.388
North Carolina A&T ‍‍‍	7	–	17	–	0	.292	10	–	36	–	0	.217
x – Division champion ‡ – Tournament champion y – Invited to the NCAA tournament As of 22:06, 25 May 2015 (UTC); Rankings from Collegiate Baseball

The 2015 Bethune–Cookman Wildcats Baseball Team represented Bethune-Cookman University in the sport of baseball during the 2015 college baseball season. The Wildcats competed in Division I of the National Collegiate Athletic Association (NCAA) and the Southern Division of the Mid-Eastern Athletic Conference (MEAC). The team was coached by Jason Beverlin, who was entering his fifth season at Bethune-Cookman.

== Roster ==
2015 Bethune-Cookman Wildcats Baseball roster
Pitchers: 6 – Joseph Calamatia – Freshman; 27 – Sidney Duprey Conde – Freshman; 45 – Kevin Griffey – (redshirt) Junior; 32 – Donte Lindsay – Sophomore; 19 – Riley O'Brien – Sophomore; 16 – Clint Clymer – Junior; 39 – Ivan Coutinho – Freshman; 25 – Abdel del Valle – (redshirt) Freshman; 15 – Byron Ferguson – Junior; 23 – German Hernandez – Junior; 36 – Alexis Herrera – Freshman; 31 – Lenny Martinez – Senior; 18 – Danny Melgarejo – Freshman; 4 – Tyler Norris – Freshman; 22 – Juan Pizzaro – (redshirt) Junior; 40 – Alex Seibold – Junior; 11 – Michael Thomasson – Sophomore; 20 – Keith Zuniga – (redshirt) Senior; Cathers: 10 – Jose Carballo – Junior; 9 – Clay Middleton – (redshirt) Sophomore; 12 – Rakeem Quinn – Junior; 5 – Zach Olszewski – Sophomore	Infielders: 38 – Brandon McCalla – Freshman; 1 – Brandon Amendolare – Sophomore; 29 – Mijon Cummings – Freshman; 8 – Jameel Edny – Freshman; 13 – Austin Garcia – Sophomore; 2 – Jordan Robinson – (redshirt) Senior; 7 – Demetrius Sims – (redshirt) Freshman; 33 – Marcus Stump – Freshman; 35 – Jordan Thomas – Junior; 37 – Brandon Wilkes – Freshman	Outfielders: 21 – Nathan Bond – Junior; 44 – Bryant Munoz – Senior; 3 – Julian Santos – (redshirt) Senior; 30 – Jake Welch – Senior; 28 – Michael Austin – Junior

== Schedule ==
2012 Bethune-Cookman Wildcats baseball game log
Regular Season

Date	Opponent	Rank	Site/stadium	Score	Win	Loss	Save	Attendance	Overall record	MEAC record
February 13	Georgia Southern		Statesboro, Ga.	0–3	Challenger (1–0)	Zuniga (0–1)	Brown (1)	1382	0–1	
February 14	Georgia Southern		Statesboro, Georgia	8–12	Richman (1–0)	Duprey (0–1)	Paesano (1)	1108	0–2	
February 15	Georgia Southern		Statesboro, Georgia	8–9	Brown (1–0)	Clymer (0–1)		1107	0–3	
February 18	UCF		Orlando, Fl.	2–10	Meyer (1–0)	O'Brien (0–1)		99	0–4	
February 20	Mercer		Daytona Beach, Fl.	2–3	Askew (2–0)	Clymer (0–2)	Kourtis (1)	94	0–5	
February 21	Mercer		Daytona Beach, Fl.	3–8	Herd (1–0)	Seibold (0–1)		102	0–6	
February 22	Mercer		Daytona Beach< Fl.	4-13	Johnson (1-1)	Griffey (0-1)		52	0-7	
February 24	Stetson		Daytona, Fla.	5-6	Wilson (3-0)	Calamita (0–1)	Sheller (1)	82	0–8	
February 25	UCF		Daytona Beach, Fla.	8–18	Hepple (1–0)	Norris (0–1)		41	0–9	
February 28	Florida A&M		Daytona Beach, Fla.	1–2	Jarrell (1–1)	Griffey (0–2)	McDonald (2)	41	0–10	0–1
March 1	Florida A&M		Daytona Beach, Fla.	6–2	Zuniga (1–1)	Carrasco (0–3)		41	1–10	1–1
March 1	Florida A&M		Daytona Beach, Fla.	0–6	Fleming (2–0)	Austin (0–1)		251	1–11	1–2
March 4	Maine		Daytona Beach, Fla.	8–11	Conway (1–0)	Duprey (0–2)	Butler (2)	112	1–12	
March 7	North Carolina Central		Daytona Beach, Fla.	6–1	Seibold (1–1)	Quinn (1–3)		79	2–12	2–2
March 7	North Carolina Central		Daytona Beach, Fla.	0–4	Dandridge (2–0)	Zuniga (1–2)		79	2–13	2–3
March 8	North Carolina Central		Daytona Beach, Fla.	11–7	Norris (1–1)	Sweet (1–1)		81	3–13	3–3
March 10	Jacksonville		Daytona Beach, Fla.	6–15	Shannahan (2–0)	Wilkes (0–1)		82	3–14	
March 11	South Florida		Daytona Beach, Fla.	0–1	Valdes (1–1)	Lindsay (0–1)	Peterson (5)	64	3–15	
March 14	North Carolina A&T		Greensboro, NC.	3–0	Zuniga (2–2)	McQueen (0–2)	Clymer (1)	55	4–15	4–3
March 15	North Carolina A&T		Greensboro, NC.	7–4	Seibold (2–1)	Liang (0–2)	Clymer (2)	56	5–15	5–3
March 15	North Carolina A&T		Greensboro, NC.	16–5	Norris (2–1)	Poag (0–2)		69	6–15	6–3
March 17	UCF		Daytona Beach, Fla.	13–18	Meyer (2–0)	Duprey (0–3)	Rodgers (1)	103	6–16	
March 18	Florida Atlantic		Daytona Beach, Fla.	0–15	Labsan (1–0)	Lindsay (0–2)		68	6–17	
March 20	FGCU		Fort Myers, Fla.	0–5	Murray (2–3)	Zuniga (0–3)		213	6–18	
March 21	FGCU		Fort Myers, Fla.	1–6	Anderson (2–0)	Seibold (2–2)		210	6–19	
March 22	FGCU		Fort Myers, Fla.	8–9	Desguin (2–0)	Lindsay (0–3)	Anderson (2)	235	6–20	
March 24	FIU		Daytona Beach, Fla.	3–2 (10)	Austin (1–1)	Diaz (0–1)		127	7–20	
March 25	North Florida		Daytona Beach, Fla.	5–11 (11)	Smith (3–1)	Pizarro (0–1)		79	7–21	
March 28	Savannah State		Daytona Beach, Fla.	6–3	Seibold (3–2)	Denny (3–1)	Clymer (3)	211	8–21	7–3
March 28	Savannah State		Daytona Beach, Fla.	9–2	Zuniga (3–3)	Robinson (4–1)		211	9–21	8–3
March 29	Savannah State		Daytona Beach, Fla.	3–2	Austin (2–1)	Davis (1–3)		151	10–21	9–3
March 31	FIU		Miami, Fla.	7–4	Austin (3–1)	Durruthy (0–1)	Clymer (4)	232	11–21	
April 1	Miami (FL)		Coral Gables, Fla.	3–13	Garcia (5–1)	Lindsay (0–4)		1950	11–22	
April 3	Florida A&M		Tallahassee, Fla.	4–1	Zuniga (4–3)	Jarrell (1–4)	Clymer (5)	229	12–22	10–3
April 4	Florida A&M		Tallahassee, Fla.	2–3	Westbrook (3–0)	Hernandez (0–1)		141	12–23	10–4
April 4	Florida A&M		Tallahassee, Fla.	3–2	Norris (3–1)	Anderson (0–3)	Clymer (6)	141	13–23	11–4
April 7	North Florida		Jacksonville, Fla.	2–3	Baker (3–2)	Seibold (3–3)	Olmstead (4)	324	13–24	
April 11	North Carolina Central		Durham, Nc.	4–2	Zuniga (5–3)	Quinn (3–5)	Clymer (7)	351	14–24	12–4
April 11	North Carolina Central		Durham, Nc.	4–8	Shields (2–3)	Hernandez (0–2)	Morgan (1)	177	14–25	12–5
April 12	North Carolina Central		Durham, Nc.	3–8	Sweet (4–2)	Seibold (3–4)		133	14–26	12–6
April 14	Jacksonville		Jacksonville, Fla.	0–16	Perez (1–1)	Duprey (0–4)		100	14–27	
April 18	North Carolina A&T		Sanford, Fla.	6–10	Poag (2–4)	Zuniga (5–4)	Garrett (1)	81	14–28	12–7
April 18	North Carolina A&T		Sanford, Fla.	3–4	Jantsch (1–1)	Norris (3–2)		82	14–29	12–8
April 19	North Carolina A&T		Sanford, Fla.	13–3	Seibold (4–4)	Cantrell (0–6)		59	15–29	13–8
April 21	Florida		Gainesville, Fla.	1–2	Poyner (3–1)	Clymer (0–3)		2446	15–30	
April 22	South Florida		Tampa, Fla.	5–7	Valdes (5–1)	Pizarro (0–2)	Peterson (13)	437	15–31	
April 24	Louisville		Louisville, Ky.	4–10	Funkhouser (6–2)	Zuniga (5–5)		2075	15–32	
April 25	Louisville		Louisville, Ky.	2–7	McKay (7–1)	Norris (3–3)	McClure (2)	789	15–33	
April 26	Louisville		Louisville, Ky.	4–5	Rogers (7–1)	Calamita (0–2)	Burdi (5)	1947	15–34	
