= 2015 Delaware State Hornets baseball team =

Baseball team representing Delaware State University

2015 Delaware State Hornets baseball
- Conference: Mid-Eastern Athletic Conference
- Record: 12–25 (11–10 MEAC)
- Head coach: J. P. Blandin (15th Year)
- Assistant coaches: Tom Riley; Jordan Elliott; Tony Gatto

2015 Mid-Eastern Athletic Conference baseball standings
	Conf.						Overall
Team	W		L		T	PCT	W		L		T	PCT
Northern
Norfolk State ^{x}‍‍‍	19	–	5	–	0	.792	27	–	16	–	0	.628
Maryland Eastern Shore ‍‍‍	14	–	10	–	0	.583	16	–	33	–	0	.327
Delaware State ‍‍‍	13	–	11	–	0	.542	16	–	29	–	0	.356
Coppin State ‍‍‍	2	–	22	–	0	.083	3	–	38	–	2	.093
Southern
Florida A&M ^{x}‍‍‡‍^{y}	15	–	9	–	0	.625	23	–	23	–	0	.500
Bethune-Cookman ‍‍‍	14	–	10	–	0	.583	19	–	40	–	0	.322
Savannah State ‍‍‍	12	–	12	–	0	.500	21	–	33	–	0	.389
North Carolina Central ‍‍‍	12	–	12	–	0	.500	19	–	30	–	0	.388
North Carolina A&T ‍‍‍	7	–	17	–	0	.292	10	–	36	–	0	.217
x – Division champion ‡ – Tournament champion y – Invited to the NCAA tournament As of 22:06, 25 May 2015 (UTC); Rankings from Collegiate Baseball

The 2015 Delaware State Hornets baseball team represented Delaware State University in the sport of baseball during the 2015 college baseball season. The Hornets competed in Division I of the National Collegiate Athletic Association (NCAA) and the Eastern Division of the Mid-Eastern Athletic Conference (MEAC). The team was coached by J. P. Blandin, who entered his fifteenth season at Delaware State. The Hornets looked to build upon their appearance in the 2014 MEAC baseball tournament, where they were eliminated after losing after two straight games in the tournament, the first to Savannah State and then Coppin State.

== Departures ==
Position	Name	Reason for departure
C	Mike Alexander	Graduation
C	Cameron Cecil	Graduation
OF	Hassan Evans	Graduation
RHP	Matt McClain	Graduation
INF	DJ Miller	Graduation
OF	Aarron Nardone	Graduation
C	Eddie Sorondo	Graduation
RHP	Kenneth Thomas	Unknown
INF	Chris Rivera	Unknown
INF	Mitchell Moore	Unknown
RHP	George Michael	Unknown
OF	Tyler Williams	Unknown
RHP	Harry Thomas	Unknown
RHP	Eric Sharff	Unknown
INF	Richard Rodriguez	Unknown
OF	Ryan Mordecai	Unknown
RHP	Kyle Mace	Unknown

== Roster ==
2014 Delaware State Hornets baseball team
Players
Coaches

#	Pos.	Name	B/T	Height	Weight	Year	Home town
9	C	Jacob Bartlett	R/R	5 ft 11 in (1.8 m)	185 lb (84 kg)	So	Wilmington, Del.
15	OF	Justin Allen	L/L	6 ft 0 in (1.83 m)	175 lb (79 kg)	RS Jr	Laurel, Del.
21	OF	Charles Dailey	R/R	5 ft 11 in (1.8 m)	190 lb (86 kg)	RS Jr	Pasadena, Ma.
20	OF	Bobby Brown	R/R	5 ft 8 in (1.73 m)	150 lb (68 kg)	Sr	Dover, Del.
40	RHP	Zach Candeloro	R/R	6 ft 4 in (1.93 m)	220 lb (100 kg)	Sr	Dover, Del.
14	INF	Cameron Onderko	R/R	5 ft 9 in (1.75 m)	165 lb (75 kg)	Jr	McKeesport, Pa.
25	OF	Ronald Farley	R/R	6 ft 0 in (1.83 m)	200 lb (91 kg)	So	Cockeysville, Md.
11	LHP	Dan Galati	L/L	5 ft 11 in (1.8 m)	170 lb (77 kg)	So	Wilmington, Del.
27	RHP	Christopher Gonzales	R/R	5 ft 11 in (1.8 m)	190 lb (86 kg)	So	Canovanas, Puerto Rico
7	INF	Richard Rodriguez	S/R	5 ft 8 in (1.73 m)	170 lb (77 kg)	Fr	Brooklyn, Ny.
1	INF	Kwestin Smith	S/R	5 ft 8 in (1.73 m)	170 lb (77 kg)	So	Teaneck, Nj.
17	LHP	Jaylen Zielecki	L/L	6 ft 0 in (1.83 m)	185 lb (84 kg)	So	Stafford, Va.
10	INF	David Kimbrough	R/R	6 ft 1 in (1.85 m)	165 lb (75 kg)	Sr	Atlanta, Ga.
3	C	Tyler Ramsey	R/R	5 ft 10 in (1.78 m)	205 lb (93 kg)	Jr	East Lake, Fla.
7	OF	Austin Bentley	R/R	5 ft 11 in (1.8 m)	205 lb (93 kg)	Fr	Waldorf, Md.
2	INF	Devin Beverly	R/R	5 ft 10 in (1.78 m)	175 lb (79 kg)	Fr	Glen Burnie, Md.
6	RHP	Zach Cooney	L/R	6 ft 0 in (1.83 m)	160 lb (73 kg)	Fr	Wilmington, Del.
18	RHP	Garrett Coverdale	R/R	6 ft 1 in (1.85 m)	170 lb (77 kg)	Fr	Frederica, Del.
19	INF	Niko Cribb	S/R	6 ft 5 in (1.96 m)	220 lb (100 kg)	Fr	Stafford, Va.
13	RHP	Tyler Cullen	R/R	6 ft 4 in (1.93 m)	195 lb (88 kg)	Fr	Dover, Del.
24	RHP	Lane Deleon	R/R	6 ft 4 in (1.93 m)	185 lb (84 kg)	Fr	Georgetown, Del.
25	LHP	Travis Dill	R/L	5 ft 11 in (1.8 m)	175 lb (79 kg)	Fr	Camden, Del.
4	LHP	Terry Godfrey	L/L	5 ft 9 in (1.75 m)	160 lb (73 kg)	Fr	East Prospect, Penn.
22	RHP	Jack Laudani	R/R	6 ft 0 in (1.83 m)	185 lb (84 kg)	Fr	Smithtown, Ny.
28	RHP	Hunter McVey	R/R	6 ft 0 in (1.83 m)	175 lb (79 kg)	Fr	Lancaster, Penn.
34	C	Chuck Olsen	R/R	5 ft 10 in (1.78 m)	185 lb (84 kg)	Fr	Nyack, Ny.
35	LHP	Darrien Ragins	L/L	6 ft 2 in (1.88 m)	200 lb (91 kg)	Fr	Severn, Md.
5	RHP	Gabe Rivera	R/R	5 ft 11 in (1.8 m)	160 lb (73 kg)	Fr	Dover, Del.
16	RHP	Tommy Spagnolo	R/R	6 ft 1 in (1.85 m)	205 lb (93 kg)	Fr	Middletown, Del.

Head coach

J. P. Blandin

Assistant coach(es)

Tom Riley

Legend

- (C) Team captain
- (S) Suspended
- (I) Ineligible
- Injured
- Current redshirt

Roster
Last update: March 2, 2015

== Schedule ==
Regular Season
Date	Opponent	Rank	Site/stadium	Score	Win	Loss	Save	Attendance	Overall record	MEAC Record
February 13	Presbyterian		Clinton, Sc.	6–13	Dees (1–0)	Galati (0–1)		153	0–1	
February 14	Presbyterian		Clinton, Sc.	3–16	Sauer (1–0)	Cullen (0–1)		124	0–2	
February 14	Presbyterian		Clinton, Sc.	2–3	Thompson (1–0)	Gonzalez (0–1)		124	0–3	
February 15	Presbyterian		Clinton, Sc.	1–2	Wortkoetter (1–0)	DeLeon (0–1)		85	0–4	
February 21	Duke		Durham, Nc.	4–9	Labosky (1–0)	Galati (0–2)		178	0–5	
February 22	Iona		Durham, Nc.	2–9	Rivera (1–1)	Gonzalez (0–2)		117	0–6	
February 22	Hartford		Durham, Nc.	0–6	McKay (1–0)	Dill (0–1)		106	0–7	
March 4	Navy		Annapolis, Md.	3–10	Meenach (3–0)	Cooney (0–1)		102	0–8	
March 9	Navy		Annapolis, Md.	2–13	Coughlin (2–1)	Gonzalez (0–3)		153	0–9	
March 15	Norfolk State		Dover, Del.	17–5	DeLeon (1–1)	Outman (1–1)		28	1–9	1–0
March 15	Norfolk State		Dover, Del.	7–11	Vales (1–2)	Ragins (0–1)		31	1–10	1–1
March 16	Norfolk State		Dover, Del.	9–8	Galati (1–2)	Butt (0–1)	Coverdale (1)	69	2–10	2–1
March 17	La Salle		Dover, Del.	14–20	Reilly (2–1)	Zielecki (0–1)		48	2–11	
March 21	Coppin State		Dover, Del.	8–5	DeLeon (2–1)	Taylor (0–2)		65	3–11	3–1
March 21	Coppin State		Dover, Del.	15–14	Coverdale (1–0)	Burgess (1–3)		75	4–11	4–1
March 22	Coppin State		Dover, Del.	18–13	Zeilecki (1–1)	Vazquez (0–1)		121	5–11	5–1
March 24	Towson		Dover, Del.	7–20	Lawler (1–3)	Cullen (0–2)		41	5–12	
March 25	George Washington		Arlington, Va.	1–0	Godfrey (1–0)	Kemp (2–2)		31	6–12	
March 29	UMES		Dover, Del.	2–4	Stinnett (2–4)	DeLeon (2–2)		94	6–13	5–2
March 30	UMES		Dover, Del.	3–11	Smith (2–2)	Galati (1–3)		42	6–14	5–3
March 30	UMES		Dover, Del.	6–8	Hoskins (1–2)	Coverdale (1–1)	Repine (4)	41	6–15	5–4
April 1	Rider		Lawrence Township, NJ.	1–5	Hirschy (1–1)	Godfrey (1–1)		104	6–16	
April 3	Norfolk State		Norfolk, Va.	0–21	Outman (4–1)	Godfrey (1–2)		193	6–17	5–5
April 4	Norfolk State		Norfolk, Va.	3–5	Hemmerich (2–2)	DeLeon (2–3)	Vales (2)	161	6–18	5–6
April 4	Norfolk State		Norfolk, Va.	2–6	Butt (1–1)	Zielecki (1–2)	Di Fulgo (1)	161	6–19	5–7
April 8	Delaware		Dover, Del.	7–12	Pechstein (1–1)	Ramsey (0–1)		55	6–20	
April 11	Coppin State		Glen Burnie, Md.	11–5	DeLeon (3–3)	Muhammad (0–8)		166	7–20	6–7
April 11	Coppin State		Glen Burnie, Md.	4–5	Estrada (1–0)	Godfrey (1–3)		175	7–21	6–8
April 12	Coppin State		Glen Burnie, Md.	6–3	Zielecki (2–2)	Devilme (0–3)	Rivera (1)	121	8–21	7–8
April 15	Navy		Dover, Del.	7–15	LaMar (1–0)	Cullen (0–3)		59	8–22	
April 18	Maryland Eastern Shore		Princess Anne, Md.	3–11	Stinnett (4–5)	DeLeon (3–4)		59	8–23	7–9
April 18	Maryland Eastern Shore		Princess Anne, Md.	5–6	Hoskins (2–2)	Rivera (0–1)		107	8–24	7–10
April 19	Maryland Eastern Shore		Princess Anne, Md.	12–10	Cooney (1–1)	Smith (3–4)	McVey (1)	96	9–24	8–10
April 21	La Salle		Philadelphia, Penn.	4–13	Meyer (2–3)	Dill (0–2)		45	9–25	
April 25	Coppin State		Hanover, Md.	17–0	DeLeon (4–4)	Devilme (0–5)		78	10–25	9–10
April 25	Coppin State		Hanover, Md.	14–5	Cooney (2–1)	Burgess (2–5)		91	11–25	10–10
April 26	Coppin State		Hanover, Md.	12–0	Zielecki (3–2)	Muhammad (0–11)		123	12–25	11–10
April 29	Towson		Towson, Md.	9–15	Sapp (2–1)	Cooney (2–2)		125	12–26	
May 2	Maryland Eastern Shore		Dover, Del.	3–9	Stinnett (6–5)	DeLeon (4–5)		102	12–27	11–11
May 2	Maryland Eastern Shore		Dover, Del.	5–1	Candeloro (1–0)	Whiteman (3–5)		68	13–27	12–11
May 3	Maryland Eastern Shore		Dover, Del.	5–4	Ragins (1–1)	Repine (0–2)		117	14–27	13–11

Post-season: MEAC Tournament
Date	Opponent	Rank	Site/stadium	Score	Win	Loss	Save	Attendance	Overall record	MEAC Record
May 13	Bethune-Cookman		Salisbury, Md.	6–2	DeLeon (5–5)	Norris (3–5)			15–27	
May 13	Norfolk State		Salisbury, Md.	13–11	McVey (1–0)	Vales (3–3)			16–27	
May 14	Florida A&M		Salisbury, Md.	2–11	Page (2–0)	Candeloro (1–1)	McDonald (7)	518	16–28	
May 15	Bethune-Cookman		Salisbury, Md.	0–13	Hernandez (1–2)	Ragins (1–2)		303	16–29	
