= 2012 Bethune–Cookman Wildcats baseball team =

American college baseball season

2012 Bethune-Cookman Wildcats baseball

MEAC Southern Division Champions MEAC Conference Champions

Gainesville Regional, 0-2
- Conference: Mid-Eastern Athletic Conference
- Record: 34-27 (18-5 MEAC)
- Head coach: Jason Beverlin (1st Year)
- Assistant coach: Barrett Shaft (1st Year)

2012 Mid-Eastern Athletic Conference baseball standings
	Conf.						Overall
Team	W		L		T	PCT	W		L		T	PCT
Northern
Delaware State ^{x}‍‍‍	22	–	2	–	0	.917	40	–	17	–	1	.698
Norfolk State ‍‍‍	15	–	9	–	0	.625	22	–	28	–	0	.440
Maryland Eastern Shore ‍‍‍	11	–	13	–	0	.458	14	–	39	–	0	.264
Coppin State ‍‍‍	0	–	24	–	0	.000	1	–	53	–	0	.019
Southern
Bethune-Cookman ^{x}‍‍‡‍^{y}	18	–	5	–	0	.783	34	–	27	–	0	.557
North Carolina Central ‍‍‍	13	–	10	–	0	.565	19	–	32	–	0	.373
North Carolina A&T ‍‍‍	12	–	12	–	0	.500	20	–	36	–	0	.357
Savannah State ‍‍‍	11	–	13	–	0	.458	19	–	34	–	0	.358
Florida A&M ‍‍‍	5	–	19	–	0	.208	7	–	45	–	0	.135
x – Division champion ‡ – Tournament champion y – Invited to the NCAA tournament As of June 4, 2012; Rankings from Collegiate Baseball

The 2012 Bethune–Cookman Wildcats baseball team represented Bethune-Cookman University in the sport of baseball during the 2012 college baseball season. The Wildcats competed in Division I of the National Collegiate Athletic Association (NCAA) and the Southern Division of the Mid-Eastern Athletic Conference (MEAC). The team was coached by Jason Beverlin, who entered his first season at Bethune-Cookman. The Wildcats won the MEAC Tournament and moved on to the NCAA tournament and participated in the Gainesville Regional, where they were beat 0-2.

== Roster ==
2018 Bethune–Cookman Wildcats baseball team
Players
Coaches

#	Pos.	Name	B/T	Height	Weight	Year	Home town
1	INF	Brashad Johnson	/	6 ft 1 in (1.85 m)	—	Sr	New Hope, Minn.
2	INF	PJ Biocic	R/R	5 ft 9 in (1.75 m)	175 lb (79 kg)	So	Merritt Island, Fla.
4	OF	Josh Johnson	R/R	5 ft 10 in (1.78 m)	195 lb (88 kg)	So	Tampa Bay, Fla.
5	OF	Nick Johnson	R/R	6 ft 3 in (1.91 m)	220 lb (100 kg)	Sr	Lakeville, Minn.
6	LHP	Diego Delgado	/	5 ft 10 in (1.78 m)	—	Jr	Pembroke Pines, Fla.
7	RHP	Montana DuRapau	R/R	5 ft 10 in (1.78 m)	175 lb (79 kg)	So	Deltona, Fla.
8	RHP	Scott Garner	R/R	6 ft 2 in (1.88 m)	185 lb (84 kg)	So	Port Orange, Fla.
11	OF	Brandon Turner	L/L	5 ft 8 in (1.73 m)	165 lb (75 kg)	Jr	Orange City, Fla.
13	INF	Alejandro Sanchez	/	5 ft 11 in (1.8 m)	—	Sr	Pembroke Pines, Fla.
16	C	Carlos Delgado	/	5 ft 10 in (1.78 m)	—	Jr	Pembroke Pines, Fla.
18	LHP	Ali Simpson	L/L	6 ft 3 in (1.91 m)	170 lb (77 kg)	RS Jr	Campbell River, B.C.
20	RHP	Jordan Dailey	R/R	6 ft 0 in (1.83 m)	210 lb (95 kg)	Jr	Orlando, Fla.
22	INF	Juan Pizarro	L/R	6 ft 0 in (1.83 m)	195 lb (88 kg)	Fr	Bayamon, Puerto Rico
23	RHP	Gabriel Hernandez	R/R	5 ft 11 in (1.8 m)	190 lb (86 kg)	Jr	Levittown, Puerto Rico
26	LHP	Bryan Rivera	/	6 ft 0 in (1.83 m)	—	So	Cidra, Puerto Rico
27	LHP	Jordan Taylor	/	6 ft 2 in (1.88 m)	—	Fr	Palm Coast, Fla.
30	OF	Jake Welch	R/R	5 ft 11 in (1.8 m)	160 lb (73 kg)	Fr	Hollywood, Fla.
31	C	Lenny Martinez	R/R	5 ft 9 in (1.75 m)	175 lb (79 kg)	Fr	Orlando, Fla.
33	INF	Anthony Stokes	L/R	6 ft 3 in (1.91 m)	225 lb (102 kg)	So	Chesapeake, Va.
36	RHP	Rayan Gonzalez	R/R	6 ft 4 in (1.93 m)	210 lb (95 kg)	Sr	Arecibo, Puerto Rico
39	RHP	Jairo Aecvedo	R/R	5 ft 10 in (1.78 m)	195 lb (88 kg)	Sr	Miami, Fla.
42	OF	David Lee	R/R	6 ft 4 in (1.93 m)	205 lb (93 kg)	Jr	Jacksonville, Fla.

Head coach

Jason Beverlin

Assistant coach(es)

Barrett Shaft

Legend

- (C) Team captain
- (S) Suspended
- (I) Ineligible
- Injured
- Current redshirt

Roster
Last update: May 2, 2014

== Schedule ==
2012 Bethune-Cookman Wildcats baseball game log
Regular season
MEAC tournament

Date	Opponent	Rank	Site/stadium	Score	Win	Loss	Save	Attendance	Overall record	MEAC record
May 17	vs. (4N) Coppin State	(1)	Marty L. Miller Field	10-4	Garner (4-4)	Neddo (0-12)	Simpson (1)		31-24	
May 18	vs. (2N) Norfolk State	(1)	Marty L. Miller Field	9-0	Durapau (4-6)	Vanassche (4-7)			32-24	
May 19	vs. (3N) UMES	(1)	Marty L. Miller Field	3-0	Gonzalez (9-1)	Gonzalez (1-6)	Dailey (11)		33-24	
May 20	vs. (1N) Delaware State	(1)	Marty L. Miller Field	2-3	Dill (3-1)	Hernandez (6-3)	Elliott (1)		33-25	
May 20	vs. (1N) Delaware State	(1)	Marty L. Miller Field	8-3	Rivera (3-3)	McClain (9-4)			34-25	

NCAA tournament

Date	Opponent	Rank	Site/stadium	Score	Win	Loss	Save	Attendance	Overall record	Tournament record
June 1	(1) Florida	(4)	Gainesville, Florida	0-4	Crawford (6-2)	Gonzalez (9-2)		3285	34-26	0-1
June 2	Charleston	(4)	Gainesville, Fla.	2-8	Pegler (10-2)	Durapau (4-7)		1441	34-27	0-2
