= Trocaire (disambiguation) =

Trocaire (Irish trócaire, mercy) may refer to:

- Trócaire, the Irish Catholic development agency
- Trocaire College in Buffalo, New York
