= Kyle McGowin =

American baseball player (born 1991)

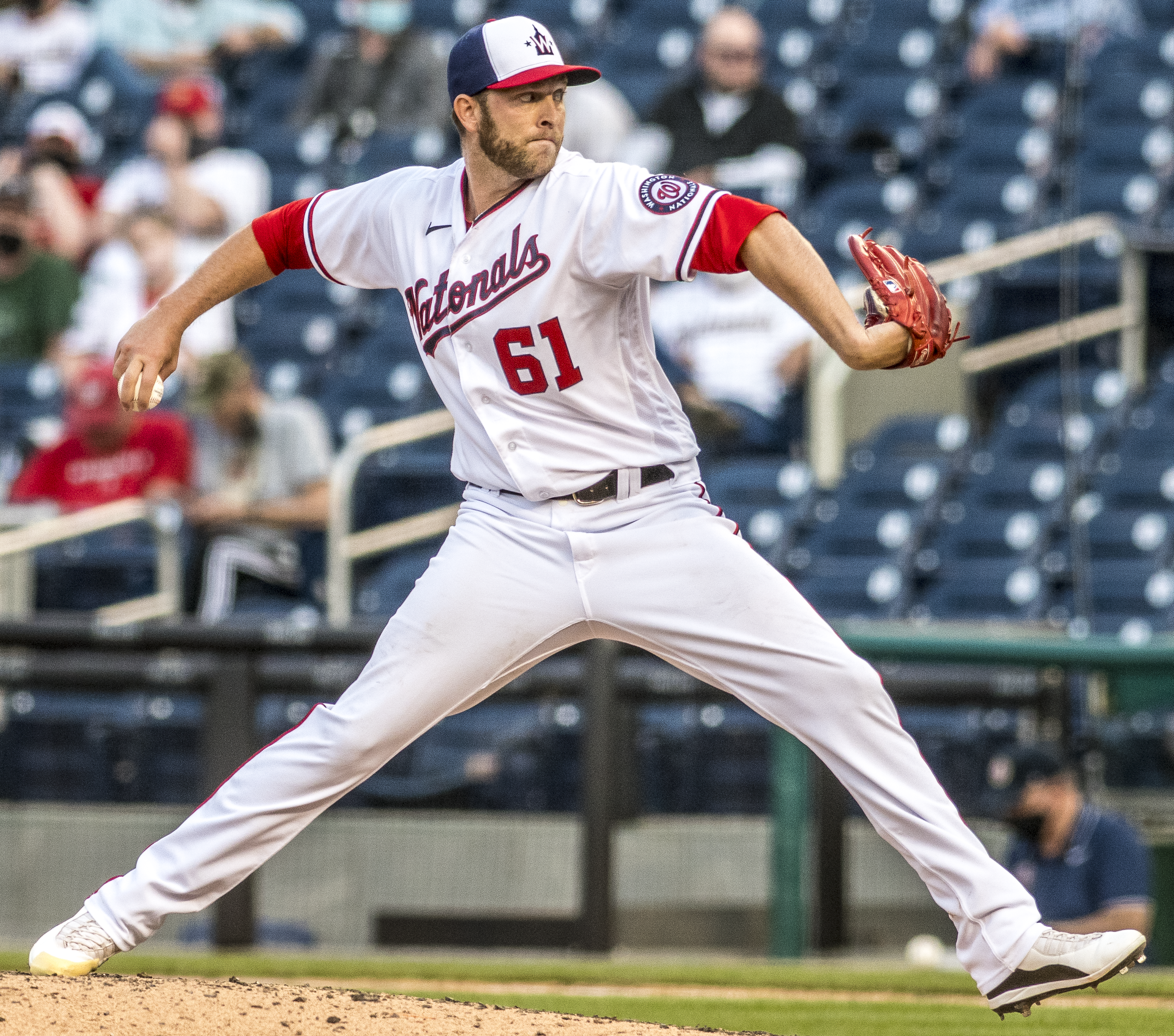
- McGowin with the Washington Nationals in 2021
- Pitcher
- Born: November 27, 1991 (age 34); Southampton, New York, U.S.
- Batted: Right Threw: Right

Professional debut
- MLB: September 5, 2018, for the Washington Nationals
- CPBL: October 8, 2023, for the CTBC Brothers

Last appearance
- MLB: August 31, 2021, for the Washington Nationals
- CPBL: October 21, 2023, for the CTBC Brothers

MLB statistics
- Win–loss record: 1–0
- Earned run average: 5.98
- Strikeouts: 77

CPBL statistics
- Win–loss record: 0–2
- Earned run average: 7.50
- Strikeouts: 15
- Stats at Baseball Reference

Teams
- Washington Nationals (2018–2021); CTBC Brothers (2023); Charleston Dirty Birds (2024–2025)

Kyle Keston McGowin (born November 27, 1991) is an American former professional baseball pitcher. He played in Major League Baseball (MLB) for the Washington Nationals and in the Chinese Professional Baseball League (CPBL) for the CTBC Brothers.

== Amateur career ==
McGowin is from Sag Harbor, New York. He attended Pierson High School, and pitched for the school's baseball team. After graduating in 2010, he enrolled at Savannah State University, and played college baseball for the Savannah State Tigers. In the 2013 Mid-Eastern Athletic Conference baseball tournament, he was named the tournament's Outstanding Performer after he pitched all ten innings of the championship game, recording 11 strikeouts. The National Collegiate Baseball Writers Association named him a First Team All-American in 2013, his junior year.

== Professional career ==
=== Los Angeles Angels ===
The Los Angeles Angels selected McGowin in the fifth round, with the 157th overall selection, of the 2013 MLB draft. After he signed with the Angels, he made his professional debut with the Orem Owlz of the Rookie-level Pioneer League. He pitched for the Inland Empire 66ers of the High-A California League in 2014, and was named a Midseason All-Star. He spent the 2015 season with the Arkansas Travelers of the Double-A Texas League, and was invited to spring training in 2016. He began the 2016 season with Arkansas, and was promoted to the Salt Lake Bees of the Triple-A Pacific Coast League.

=== Washington Nationals ===
On December 10, 2016, the Washington Nationals acquired McGowin and Austin L. Adams in exchange for Danny Espinosa. McGowin started the year with the Triple-A Syracuse Chiefs but was assigned down to the Double-A Harrisburg Senators on June 16, 2017, after posting a 6.31 ERA and a 1–6 win–loss record in nine starts. He pitched for the Mesa Solar Sox in the Arizona Fall League after the 2017 season, making six starts and striking out 27 batters without a walk allowed.

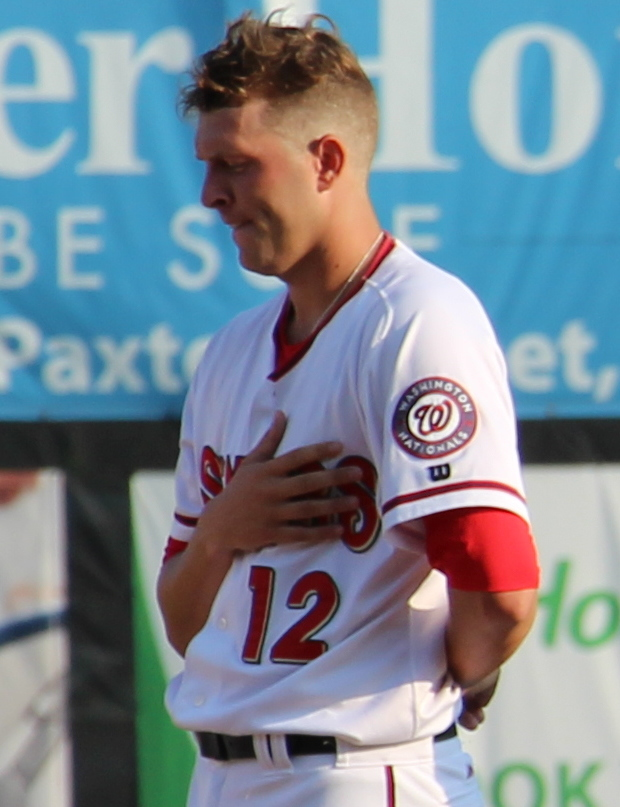
McGowin with the Harrisburg Senators in 2018

In 2018, McGowin bounced back, earning a promotion back to Triple-A midway through the season and putting up a 1.20 ERA down the stretch with the Chiefs as a reliable starting pitcher. He was among several pitchers mentioned by media as potential late-season call-ups by the Nationals.

On September 3, 2018, the Nationals selected McGowin's contract, calling him up to the major leagues for the first time. He made his major league debut on September 5, pitching an inning against the St. Louis Cardinals and giving up a solo home run to Yairo Muñoz.

McGowin appeared in 7 games for the Nationals in 2019, registering an ugly 10.13 ERA with 18 strikeouts in 16.0 innings of work. Although he was not on the National's postseason roster, the Nationals won the World Series in 2019 and McGowin earned his first championship title. Pitching in relief against the Atlanta Braves on September 5, 2020, McGowin earned his first career win. On the season, McGowin appeared in 9 games for the Nationals, pitching to a 4.91 ERA with 16 strikeouts in 11.0 innings pitched.

In 2021, McGowin made 27 appearances for the Nationals, recording a 4.20 ERA with 35 strikeouts in 30.0 innings of work. On September 4, 2021, McGowin was placed on the 60-day injured list after being diagnosed with a UCL sprain in his right elbow. On November 5, McGowin was outrighted off of the 40-man roster. He elected free agency on November 7.

=== Staten Island FerryHawks ===
On April 19, 2023, McGowin signed with the Staten Island FerryHawks of the Atlantic League of Professional Baseball. He was the Opening Day starter for Staten Island, tossing five perfect innings while striking out 11.

=== Houston Astros ===
On May 9, 2023, McGowin's contract was purchased by the Houston Astros organization. In 16 games (9 starts) for the Triple–A Sugar Land Space Cowboys, he posted a 3–7 record and 7.36 ERA with 58 strikeouts in 62 1/3 innings pitched. On August 16, McGowin was released by Houston.

=== Lake Country DockHounds ===
On August 26, 2023, McGowin signed with the Lake Country DockHounds of the American Association of Professional Baseball. In his only appearance for Lake Country, a start, he allowed 3 runs (2 earned) on 6 hits with 7 strikeouts in 6.0 innings of work.

=== CTBC Brothers ===
On August 29, 2023, McGowin signed with CTBC Brothers of the Chinese Professional Baseball League (CPBL). In 3 starts for the Brothers, he logged a 7.50 ERA with 15 strikeouts across 12 innings pitched. McGowin became a free agent following the 2023 season.

=== Charleston Dirty Birds ===
On March 13, 2024, McGowin signed with the Charleston Dirty Birds of the Atlantic League. In two starts for Charleston, McGowin posted a 2.70 ERA with 11 strikeouts across 10 innings pitched.

=== Chicago Cubs ===
On May 10, 2024, McGowin's contract was purchased by the Chicago Cubs organization. In 15 starts split between the Double–A Tennessee Smokies and Triple–A Iowa Cubs, he accumulated a 2–4 record and 4.66 ERA with 72 strikeouts across 75 1/3 innings pitched. McGowin was released by the Cubs organization on August 8.

=== Charleston Dirty Birds (second stint) ===
On April 22, 2025, McGowin signed with the Charleston Dirty Birds of the Atlantic League of Professional Baseball. In 12 starts for Charleston, he logged a 2-6 record and 3.39 ERA with 51 strikeouts across 63 2/3 innings pitched. McGowin retired from professional baseball on July 21.

== Pitching style ==
McGowin pitches right-handed, with a crossfire delivery that adds deception to his pitches. His primary pitch is a fastball that sits at about 91 miles per hour (146 km/h), with a slider and circle changeup that complement it. He is considered to have above-average control.
