= 2013 Mid-Eastern Athletic Conference baseball tournament =

- Teams: 8
- Format: Double-elimination tournament
- Finals site: Marty L. Miller Field; Norfolk, VA
- Champions: Savannah State (1st title)
- Winning coach: Carlton Hardy (1st title)
- MVP: Kyle McGowin (Savannah State)

2013 Mid-Eastern Athletic Conference baseball standings
	Conf.				Overall
Team	W		L	PCT	W		L	PCT
Northern
Delaware State ^{x}‍‍‍	21	–	3	.875	32	–	16	.667
Norfolk State ‍‍‍	13	–	13	.500	20	–	31	.392
Coppin State ‍‍‍	12	–	14	.462	19	–	34	.358
Maryland Eastern Shore ‍‍‍	4	–	20	.167	8	–	45	.151
Southern
Savannah State ^{x}‍‍‡‍^{y}	17	–	7	.708	33	–	22	.600
Bethune–Cookman ^{x}‍‍‍	17	–	7	.708	34	–	25	.576
North Carolina Central ‍‍‍	12	–	12	.500	28	–	28	.500
North Carolina A&T ‍‍‍	8	–	16	.333	16	–	37	.302
Florida A&M ‍‍‍	6	–	18	.250	7	–	47	.130
x – Division champion ‡ – Tournament champion y – Invited to the NCAA tournament As of May 16, 2013; Rankings from Collegiate Baseball

The 2013 Mid-Eastern Athletic Conference baseball tournament began on May 15 and ended on May 19 at Marty L. Miller Field, on the campus of Norfolk State University in Norfolk, Virginia. It was an eight-team double elimination tournament. South Division top seed Savannah State won their first tournament championship to claim the Mid-Eastern Athletic Conference's automatic bid to the 2013 NCAA Division I baseball tournament. The Tigers defeated Bethune-Cookman, who had claimed thirteen of the fourteen tournament championships, with North Carolina A&T winning the other.

== Format and seeding ==
The four teams in the North Division and top four finishers from the South Division were seeded one through four based on regular season records, with first round matchups of the top seed from the North and the fourth seed from the South, the second seed from the North against the third seed from the South, and so on. The winners advanced in the winners' bracket, while first round losers played elimination games. The format means that one team from the South, Florida A&M, was not in the field. Savannah State claimed the top seed from the South over Bethune-Cookman by tiebreaker.

Team	W	L	Pct.	GB	Seed
Northern
Delaware State	21	3	.875	–	1N
Norfolk State	13	13	.500	9	2N
Coppin State	12	14	.462	10	3N
Maryland Eastern Shore	4	20	.167	17	4N
Southern
Savannah State	17	7	.708	–	1S
Bethune-Cookman	17	7	.708	–	2S
North Carolina Central	12	12	.500	5	3S
North Carolina A&T	8	16	.333	9	4S
Florida A&M	6	18	.250	11	–

== Bracket ==
Upper round 1	Upper round 2	Upper final	Final
1S	Savannah State	3
4N	Maryland Eastern Shore	1
1S	Savannah State	21
2N	Norfolk State	11
2N	Norfolk State	5
3S	North Carolina Central	4
1S	Savannah State	14
3N	Coppin State	7
2S	Bethune-Cookman	8
3N	Coppin State	10
3N	Coppin State	7
4S	North Carolina A&T	3
1N	Delaware State	11*
4S	North Carolina A&T	16*	1S	Savannah State	1†	—
2S	Bethune-Cookman	0†	—
Lower round 1	Lower round 2	Lower round 3	Lower final
2N	Norfolk State	6
4N	Maryland Eastern Shore	4	3S	North Carolina Central	12	3N	Coppin State	1
3S	North Carolina Central	10	3S	North Carolina Central	3	2S	Bethune Cookman	4
2S	Bethune Cookman	7
4S	North Carolina A&T	5
2S	Bethune-Cookman	5	2S	Bethune Cookman	11
1N	Delaware State	1

* - Indicates game required 13 innings.
† - Indicates game required 10 innings.

== All-Tournament Team ==
The following players were named to the All-Tournament Team.

Name	School
David Hamlet	Coppin State
Eric Kimber	North Carolina Central
Luis Diaz	North Carolina Central
Kelvin Freeman	North Carolina A&T
Troy Marrow	North Carolina Central
Tre-Von Johnson	Maryland Eastern Shore
Todd Hagen	Savannah State
Brandon Turner	Bethune-Cookman
Eric Sams	Bethune-Cookmann
David Richards	Savannah State
Kyle McGowin	Savannah State

=== Outstanding Performer ===
Kyle McGowin was named Outstanding Performer of the Tournament. McGowin was a pitcher for Savannah State, who threw all ten innings of the championship and recorded 11 strikeouts.
