= Kara Tucina Olidge =

American Scholar and Arts and Cultural Heritage Administrator

Kara Tucina Olidge is a scholar and arts and educational administrator who has held leadership positions at libraries, research institutions, and community-based organizations across the United States. Currently, she holds the role of Associate Director for Collections & Discovery at the Getty Research Institute in Los Angeles.

== Early life and education ==
Born in New Orleans, Louisiana, Olidge completed her studies with a regents diploma and was a recipient of the Coca-Cola Scholars Foundation "I Have a Dream" Scholarship. She graduated from Spelman College in 1992 with a bachelor's degree in philosophy and a minor in art history. During her time at Spelman, she worked as a library principal assistant at the Atlanta–Fulton Public Library System where she assisted the community in enhancing literacy skills.

She received a Master of Arts in arts administration from the University of New Orleans in 2000 and was selected as a Marcus B. Christian Graduate Scholarship recipient. Her thesis, "Stella Jones Gallery: Organizational Analysis and Suggested Marketing Plan" analyzed the organizational structure and cultures of the Stella Jones Gallery. In it, she proposed a marketing plan to support, expose, and expand the mission of the organization. During her time in graduate school, she became involved in the arts community in New Orleans, including becoming the director of education for the Shakespeare Festival at Tulane University, the gallery manager at the Stella Jones Gallery, and the visual art curator at the Amistad Research Center at Tulane.

After moving to Buffalo, New York in 2000, she continued her work in the arts and community activism. She received her Ph.D. in educational leadership and policy at the State University of New York at Buffalo in 2010 and received the Mark Diamond Research Grant for her doctoral work. Her dissertation, "Critical cosmopolitanism and the intellectual work of Alain Locke" explored how Locke's educational experiences and sexuality influenced his deployment of critical cosmopolitanism in his work as a Negro educator and cultural activist. In contrast to arguments by Nathan Huggins and Henry Louis Gates Jr. that Locke was an elite integrationist, Olidge's research characterizes Locke as an educator and cultural activist whose lifework was to dismantle racial inequality.

While working on her Ph.D. at the State University of New York at Buffalo, she was the program director of community and college connections at the Educational Opportunity Center at the university, the senior program officer of Good Schools for All at the Community Foundation for Greater Buffalo, and the Advanced Technology Training and Information Networking (ATTAIN) Lab site supervisor and manager at the State University of New York at Buffalo Center for Academic and Workforce Development.

== Career ==
At the Getty Research Institute, Olidge oversees the largest of the organization's four divisions, with a purview over the library, which is often touted as the largest art library in the world, special collections, curatorial, exhibitions, conservation, and institutional archives. At Getty, she has engaged in strategic planning, overseen a new approach to metadata, and played a shaping role in major institutional projects, such as the Johnson Publishing Company Archive and the African American Art History Initiative (AAAHI). She has also conducted field research in Kenya, Nigeria, and Ghana and presented at international venues, such as the Black Portraitures conference in Venice (2024) and the National Center for Art Research in Japan (2024).

From 2015 to 2022, Olidge was the executive director of the Amistad Research Center at Tulane University. When her appointment was announced, she was celebrated as the first woman to lead this organization, which is regarded as "the nation's oldest, largest and most comprehensive independent archive” dedicated to the history of African Americans and other ethnic minorities. From 2012 to 2014, she was the deputy director of the Schomburg Center for Research in Black Culture, a branch of the New York Public Library based in Harlem. The Schomburg is one of the world's leading research facilities dedicated to the history of the African diaspora. Before joining the Schomburg in 2012, Olidge was the director of the Hetrick-Martin Institute, a nonprofit organization serving lesbian, gay, bisexual, and transgender youth in Newark, NJ.

Olidge's scholarly work has focused on critical cosmopolitanism, identity and cultural activism within communities of color. She has taught at the State University of New York at Buffalo, Medaille College, and the Arts Council of New Orleans' Urban Arts Training Program. She has been invited to conferences and panels to discuss her expertise on art and cultural activism, homophobia, racialized identities and curatorial work. She has curated art exhibits for emerging artists of color and given lectures on the intersection of arts and activism and arts-centered literacy.

== Professional affiliations and Service to the Field ==
Olidge holds a distinguished record of service to non-profit arts institutions and community-based organizations. She is a board member for South Arts, an organization that is committed to promoting and supporting arts in the American south. In the past, she has served on the Queer Newark Oral History Project Committee and the Essex County Lesbian, Gay, Bisexual, Transgender and Questioning Advisory Board, the first county-level board of its kind in New Jersey. She also held the role of finance chair of the Newark-Essex Pride Coalition, which organizes Newark LGBT Pride events. In 2015-16, she was a board member of CLAGS: The Center for LGBTQ Studies, housed at CUNY's Graduate Center. She was previously the Board Development Committee Chair and the Planning Committee co-chair at the Hallwalls Contemporary Arts Center between 2008 and 2010.
