= 2012 Mid-Eastern Athletic Conference baseball tournament =

- Teams: 8
- Format: Double-elimination tournament
- Finals site: Marty L. Miller Field; Norfolk, VA
- Champions: Bethune-Cookman (13th title)
- Winning coach: Jason Beverlin (1st title)
- MVP: David Lee (Bethune-Cookman)

2012 Mid-Eastern Athletic Conference baseball standings
	Conf.						Overall
Team	W		L		T	PCT	W		L		T	PCT
Northern
Delaware State ^{x}‍‍‍	22	–	2	–	0	.917	40	–	17	–	1	.698
Norfolk State ‍‍‍	15	–	9	–	0	.625	22	–	28	–	0	.440
Maryland Eastern Shore ‍‍‍	11	–	13	–	0	.458	14	–	39	–	0	.264
Coppin State ‍‍‍	0	–	24	–	0	.000	1	–	53	–	0	.019
Southern
Bethune-Cookman ^{x}‍‍‡‍^{y}	18	–	5	–	0	.783	34	–	27	–	0	.557
North Carolina Central ‍‍‍	13	–	10	–	0	.565	19	–	32	–	0	.373
North Carolina A&T ‍‍‍	12	–	12	–	0	.500	20	–	36	–	0	.357
Savannah State ‍‍‍	11	–	13	–	0	.458	19	–	34	–	0	.358
Florida A&M ‍‍‍	5	–	19	–	0	.208	7	–	45	–	0	.135
x – Division champion ‡ – Tournament champion y – Invited to the NCAA tournament As of June 4, 2012; Rankings from Collegiate Baseball

The 2012 Mid-Eastern Athletic Conference baseball tournament began on May 17 and ended on May 20, 2012, at Marty L. Miller Field, on the campus of Norfolk State University in Norfolk, Virginia. It is an eight-team double elimination tournament. Bethune-Cookman won the tournament, as they have done every year but one since the tournament began in 1999. The Wildcats claimed the Mid-Eastern Athletic Conference's automatic bid to the 2012 NCAA Division I baseball tournament.

== Format and seeding ==
The four teams in the North Division and top four finishers from the South Division were seeded one through four based on regular season records, with first round matchups of the top seed from the North and the fourth seed from the South, the second seed from the North against the third seed from the South, and so on. The winners advanced in the winners' bracket, while first round losers played elimination games. The format meant that Florida A&M was left out of the field.

Team	W	L	Pct.	GB	Seed
Northern
Delaware State	22	2	.917	–	1N
Norfolk State	15	9	.625	7	2N
Maryland Eastern Shore	11	13	.458	11	3N
Coppin State	0	24	.000	22	4N
Southern
Bethune-Cookman	18	5	.783	–	1S
North Carolina Central	13	10	.565	5	2S
North Carolina A&T	12	12	.500	6.5	3S
Savannah State	11	13	.458	7.5	4S
Florida A&M	5	19	.208	13.5	–

== Bracket ==
First round	Second round	Semifinals	Final
4N	Coppin State	4
1S	Bethune-Cookman	10
1S	Bethune-Cookman	9
2N	Norfolk State	0
3S	North Carolina A&T	3
2N	Norfolk State	4
1S	Bethune-Cookman	3
3N	Maryland Eastern Shore	0
4S	Savannah State	8
1N	Delaware State	10
1N	Delaware State	6
3N	Maryland Eastern Shore	7
3N	Maryland Eastern Shore	13
2S	North Carolina Central	5	1S	Bethune-Cookman	2	8
1N	Delaware State	3	3
Lower round 1	Lower round 2	Lower round 3	Lower final
2N	Norfolk State	1
3S	North Carolina A&T	14	3S	North Carolina A&T	18	1N	Delaware State	7
4N	Coppin State	3	3S	North Carolina A&T	2	3N	Maryland Eastern Shore	2
1N	Delaware State	4
1N	Delaware State	16
2S	North Carolina Central	10	2S	North Carolina Central	2
4S	Savannah State	3

== All-Tournament Team ==
The following players were named to the All-Tournament Team.

Name	Team
Karim Gonzalez	Maryland Eastern Shore
Bryon Campbell	Maryland Eastern Shore
Stephen Bull	Maryland Eastern Shore
Tyler Murphy	North Carolina Central
Troy Marrow	North Carolina Central
Luke Tendler	North Carolina A&T
Ryan Haas	Delaware State
Scott Davis	Delaware State
Tony Gatto	Delaware State
Rayan Gonzalez	Bethune-Cookman
David Lee	Bethune-Cookman

=== Outstanding Performer ===
David Lee
Bethune-Cookman

== See also ==
- College World Series
- NCAA Division I Baseball Championship
