= 2021 Mid-Eastern Athletic Conference baseball tournament =

Postseason collegiate baseball tournament

- Teams: 8
- Format: Double-elimination tournament
- Finals site: Marty L. Miller Field; Norfolk, Virginia
- Champions: Norfolk State (1st title)
- Winning coach: Keith Shumate (1st title)
- MVP: Alsander Womack (Norfolk State)
- Television: FloSports

2021 Mid-Eastern Athletic Conference baseball standings
	Conf.				Overall
Team	W		L	PCT	W		L	PCT
Northern Division
Norfolk State ^{x}‍‍‡‍^{y}	18	–	10	.643	25	–	28	.472
Delaware State ‍‍‍	13	–	18	.419	15	–	27	.357
Coppin State ‍‍‍	7	–	20	.259	10	–	29	.256
Southern Division
North Carolina Central ^{x}‍‍‍	17	–	11	.607	27	–	20	.574
Florida A&M ‍‍‍	15	–	13	.536	22	–	33	.400
North Carolina A&T ‍‍‍	17	–	15	.531	22	–	32	.407
x – Division champion ‡ – Tournament champion y – Invited to the NCAA tournament: Florida A&M is ineligible for postseason play and conference championships due to NCAA sanctions. As of June 5, 2021 Rankings from D1Baseball

The 2021 Mid-Eastern Athletic Conference baseball tournament began on May 20 and ended on May 22 at Marty L. Miller Field on the campus of Norfolk State University in Norfolk, Virginia. It was a six-team double elimination tournament. Norfolk State won the tournament for the first time and claimed the Mid-Eastern Athletic Conference's automatic bid to the 2021 NCAA Division I baseball tournament. Departing member Bethune-Cookman, which opted out of baseball competition for 2021, had claimed sixteen of the prior twenty-one tournament championships, with North Carolina A&T earning the 2005 and 2018 titles, Florida A&M winning in 2015 and 2019, and Savannah State in 2013.

== Format and seeding ==
The top two teams from each division qualified for the Tournament, with seeding determined by conference winning percentage from the regular season. The top seed form the North Division played the second seed from the South and vice versa, with winners advancing and losers playing elimination games in the double-elimination tournament.

North Division
Team	W	L	Pct.	GB	Seed
Norfolk State	18	10	.643	—	1N
Delaware State	13	18	.419	6.5	2N
Coppin State	7	20	.259	10.5	—

West Division
Team	W	L	Pct.	GB	Seed
North Carolina Central	17	11	.607	—	1S
Florida A&M	15	13	.536	2	2S
North Carolina A&T	17	15	.531	2	—

== Tournament ==
=== Bracket ===
Upper round 1
1N	Norfolk State	8
2S	Florida A&M	3
1S	North Carolina Central	9
2N	Delaware State	4
Lower round 1
2S	Florida A&M	14
2N	Delaware State	13

Upper final
1N	Norfolk State	1
1S	North Carolina Central	0
Lower final
1S	North Carolina Central	5
2S	Florida A&M	3

Final
1N	Norfolk State
1S	North Carolina Central

=== Game results ===
Date	Game	Winner	Score	Loser	Notes
May 20	Game 1	(1S) North Carolina Central	9–4	(2N) Delaware State	
May 20	Game 2	(1N) Norfolk State	8–3	(2S) Florida A&M	
May 21	Game 3	(1N) Norfolk State	1–0	(1S) North Carolina Central	
May 21	Game 4	(2S) Florida A&M	14–13	(2N) Delaware State	Delaware State eliminated
May 21	Game 5	(1S) North Carolina Central	5–3	(2S) Florida A&M	Florida A&M eliminated
May 22	Game 6	(1N) Norfolk State	7–6^{11}	(1S) North Carolina Central	Norfolk State wins MEAC Tournament

== All-Tournament Team ==
The following players were named to the All-Tournament Team.

Name	School
LJ Bryant	Florida A&M
James Deloatch	Norfolk State
Ty Hanchey	Norfolk State
Danny Hosley	Norfolk State
Cort Maynard	North Carolina Central
Octavien Moyer	Florida A&M
Cameron Norgren	North Carolina Central
Miguel Rivera	Delaware State
Shawn Runey	North Carolina Central
Austin Vernon	North Carolina Central
John Weglarz	Delaware State
Alsander Womack	Norfolk State

=== Outstanding Performer and Outstanding Coach ===
Alsander Womack was named Tournament Outstanding Performer, while Keith Shumate was named Tournament Outstanding Coach. Womack was a second baseman for Norfolk State, while Shumate was the Spartans' head coach.
