= Jamey Shouppe =

Current position
- Title: Head coach
- Team: Florida A&M
- Conference: SWAC
- Record: 301–320

Biographical details
- Born: October 7, 1960 (age 66)

Playing career
- 1979–1980: Wallace Community College
- 1981–1982: Florida State
- 1982: Auburn Astros
- 1982: Asheville Tourists
- 1983: Daytona Beach Astros
- 1984–1985: Columbus Astros
- Position: Pitcher

Coaching career (HC unless noted)
- 1990–2011: Florida State (Asst.)
- 2013: Douglas (GA) Coffee
- 2014–present: Florida A&M

Head coaching record
- Overall: 301–320
- Tournaments: MEAC: 14–11; SWAC 9–5; NCAA: 0–6

Accomplishments and honors

Championships
- 3x MEAC Southern division (2014–16); 2× MEAC Tournament champions (2015, 2019); SWAC Tournament (2023); SWAC East division (2024)

Awards
- SWAC Coach of the Year (2024); 2× MEAC Coach of the Year (2014, 2016)

Jamey David Shouppe (born October 7, 1960) is an American college baseball coach, currently serving as head coach of the Florida A&M Rattlers baseball program. He was named to that position prior to the 2014 season.

== Playing career ==
Shouppe pitched at Wallace Community College for two seasons before completing his eligibility at Florida State. He was drafted in the eighth round of the 1982 MLB draft by the Houston Astros and played four seasons in the minor leagues with the organization. He reached as high as Class-AA, playing two seasons at Columbus.

== Coaching career ==
Shouppe began his coaching career in 1990 when he was hired by Mike Martin at Florida State to serve as Recruiting Coordinator. He soon added pitching coach duties, and delivered highly ranked recruiting classes and a strong pitching staff for the perennially strong program. He remained in that position with the Seminoles through 2011. A year later, he accepted the head coaching position at Coffee High School in Douglas, Georgia serving for the 2013 season. In July 2013, Shouppe was named head coach at Florida A&M.

== Head coaching record ==
Below is a table of Shouppe's yearly records as an NCAA head baseball coach.

Record table
Season	Team	Overall	Conference	Standing	Postseason
Florida A&M Rattlers (Mid-Eastern Athletic Conference) (2014–2021)
2014	Florida A&M	26–26	14–10	T-1st (Southern)	
2015	Florida A&M	23–25	15–9	1st (Southern)	NCAA Regional
2016	Florida A&M	31–21	19–5	1st (Southern)	
2017	Florida A&M	27–26	14–10	3rd (Southern)	
2018	Florida A&M	20–32	15–9	2nd (Southern)	
2019	Florida A&M	27–34	14–10	2nd (Southern)	NCAA Regional
2020	Florida A&M	5–10	0–0		Season canceled due to COVID-19
2021	Florida A&M	22–34	15–13	2nd (South)	MEAC tournament
Florida A&M:			92–66		
Florida A&M Rattlers (Southwestern Athletic Conference) (2022–present)
2022	Florida A&M	29–30	19–11	3rd (East)	SWAC tournament
2023	Florida A&M	29–30	18–12	3rd (East)	NCAA Regional
2024	Florida A&M	29–27	22–8	1st (East)	SWAC tournament
2025	Florida A&M	33–25	23–6	2nd	SWAC tournament
Florida A&M:		301–320	82–37		
Total:		301–320			
National champion Postseason invitational champion Conference regular season champion Conference regular season and conference tournament champion Division regular season champion Division regular season and conference tournament champion Conference tournament champion

== See also ==
- Career statistics from Baseball Reference (Minors)
- List of current NCAA Division I baseball coaches
