= Medaille University =

Private university in Buffalo, New York

Medaille College
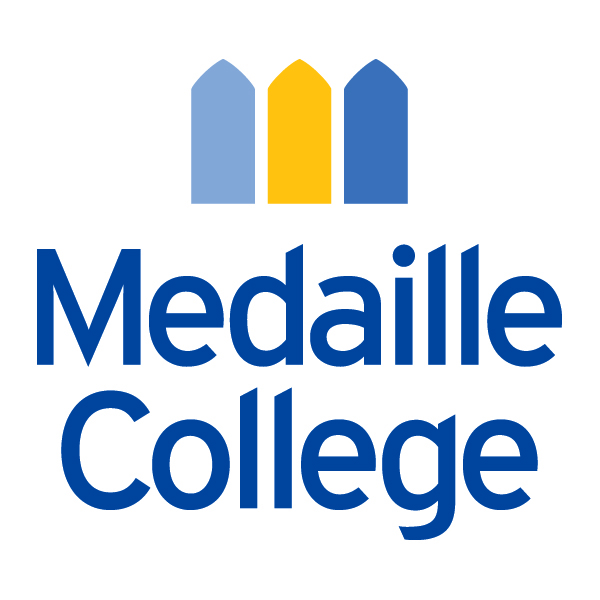
- Medaille College logo
- Type: Private college
- Active: 1937–2023
- Endowment: $1.5 million (2017)
- Faculty: 90
- Undergraduates: 1,600
- Postgraduates: 1,000
- Location: Buffalo, New York, U.S. 42.9286°N 78.8560°W
- Campus: 13 acres (5.3 ha); Urban
- Colors: Navy, gold, light blue
- Nickname: Mavericks
- Sporting affiliations: NCAA Division III
- Website: www.medaille.edu

Medaille University was a private college in Buffalo, New York. The Sisters of St. Joseph founded Medaille in 1937, naming it after their founder, Jean Paul Médaille. It later became nonsectarian and coeducational. The college served roughly 1,600 students, mainly from Western New York and Southern Ontario, during its final years.

In May 2022, the Board of Regents of the New York State Department of Education approved a request by Medaille College to be designated a university. Due to ongoing financial and enrollment challenges, Medaille announced its closure effective August 31, 2023.

== History ==
The Sisters of St. Joseph opened the Institute of the Sisters of Saint Joseph in 1875. This training center for nuns and other vowed women who wanted to serve the church in education, laid the first foundations for what would later eventually become Medaille College.

Degrees were first offered in 1937. At that time, the school's name was Mount Saint Joseph Teachers' College. In 1964, it became Mount Saint Joseph College and in 1968, Medaille College. Most graduates went on to teach at Catholic schools in New York State.

=== Conflicts over academic freedom ===
In 2002, President John J. Donohue fired tenured professor Therese Dillon Warden and suspended professor Uhuru Watson. In addition, two other non-tenured professors were likewise punished. They all had allegedly passed around confidential meeting minutes from the tenure and promotion committee and were forbidden to enter campus. Many colleagues protested the disciplinary action as a violation of academic freedom. Kenneth Weshues stated that "Dozens, perhaps hundreds, of individuals at the college have been harmed" due to a "social ill that has laid the college low."

In May 2021, Medaille was sanctioned by the American Association of University Professors for eliminating shared governance with the faculty during the early months of the COVID-19 pandemic.

=== Cancelled acquisition and closure ===
In 2022, Medaille and nearby Trocaire College (in South Buffalo) signed a memorandum of understanding that set "in motion a cooperative agreement that would fulfill the missions of both institutions into the future." Six buildings on Medaille's campus were sold to Trocaire in January 2023 and on April 4, it was announced by interim Medaille President Dr. Lori Quigley that Trocaire College would be acquiring Medaille with a scheduled closing date of July 31, 2023. The university was to become a part of Trocaire, while some sports teams would keep using the Medaille Mavericks name. A month later Trocaire College announced they would no longer be acquiring Medaille.

On May 15, 2023, Medaille University announced that it would close on August 31, 2023 and ceased academic operations on that date. A few months later, Niagara University was named as the legacy school for Medaille, as required by state law, agreeing to hold all of the latter's "academic records, student transcripts, and academic catalogs".

== Campuses ==
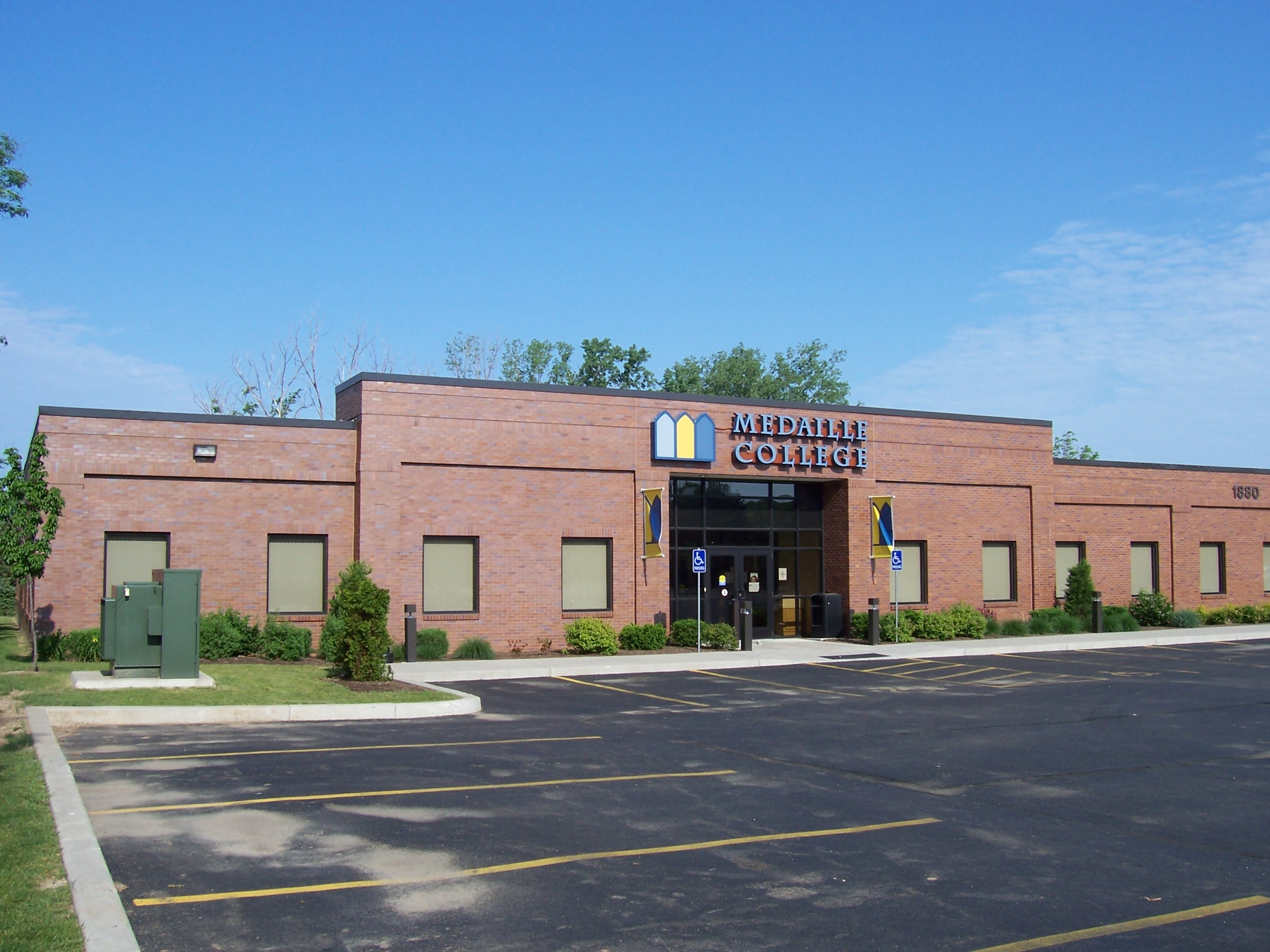
Rochester campus in Brighton, Monroe County, New York

Medaille's main campus was in Buffalo, New York and 40% of the students lived on campus. It was within the Olmsted Crescent, a historic area of parkways and landscape designed by Frederick Law Olmsted. In January 2023, six campus buildings on Medaille's Buffalo campus were sold to Trocaire College.

Medaille also had a branch campus in Rochester. This campus offered undergraduate degrees for adult students in business administration, and graduate degrees in business administration and organizational leadership, as well as mental health counseling.

The vast majority of students were from New York State. In 2015, 3% came from out of state.

== Athletics ==
Medaille Mavericks
- University: Medaille College
- Nickname: Mavericks
- NCAA: Division III
- Conference: Allegheny Mountain Collegiate Conference
- Athletic director: Susan Roarke
- Location: Buffalo, New York
- Varsity teams: 19
- Basketball arena: Sullivan Center
- Baseball stadium: McCarthy Park
- Soccer stadium: All-High Stadium
- Lacrosse stadium: All-High Stadium
- Colors: Navy, Gold, and Light Blue
- Website: www.medaillesports.com

Medaille was a charter member of the Allegheny Mountain Collegiate Conference, as an NCAA Division III school.

AMCC Championships:

- Baseball - 2007
- Men’s Basketball - 2008–2009, 2009–2010, 2011–2012, 2014–2015, 2016–2017, 2021-2022
- Women's basketball - 2005–06, 2006–07, 2007–08, 2009–2010
- Men's soccer - 2005, 2006, 2007, 2008, 2009, 2010.
- The 2010 men's soccer team reached Sweet 16 in 2010, the furthest any Medaille sports team ever advanced. Also that same year, their undefeated streak in the AMCC of five years was finally snapped. On September 25, 2010, the Franciscan University Barons pulled off a huge upset, winning the match 2–1.

The Medaille Sports Complex was opened in 2019, but only used intermittently as it was built on a brownfield site next to a chemical plant, causing health concerns for athletes.

== Notable alumni ==
- Gary Boughton – professional soccer player
- David Cullen – professional ice hockey player
- Kyle Ferguson – professional soccer player
- Betty Jean Grant – Erie County Legislature
- Kendell McFayden – professional soccer player
- Adam Page – Paralympic (sled hockey) Gold medalist
- Anne E. Patrick – theologian and professor
- Robby Takac – musician and founding member of the Goo Goo Dolls
- A. J. Verel – kickboxer, martial artist, actor, and stuntman

== Notable faculty and staff ==
- Janel Curry – interim vice president for academic affairs
- Richard Jacob – professor of psychology and sport studies (1995–2023); athletic director
- Jim Koerner – head baseball coach
- Mike MacDonald – college basketball coach
- Alexander Nwora – college basketball coach
- Kara Tucina Olidge – scholar, arts and educational administrator
- Ethan Paquin – associate professor of humanities (2004–2010), poet, and editor-in-chief of Slope Editions
- Dick Rifenburg – communications professor and pioneering television broadcaster

== See also ==
- List of defunct colleges and universities in New York
