= Trocaire College =

Catholic college in Buffalo, New York, U.S.

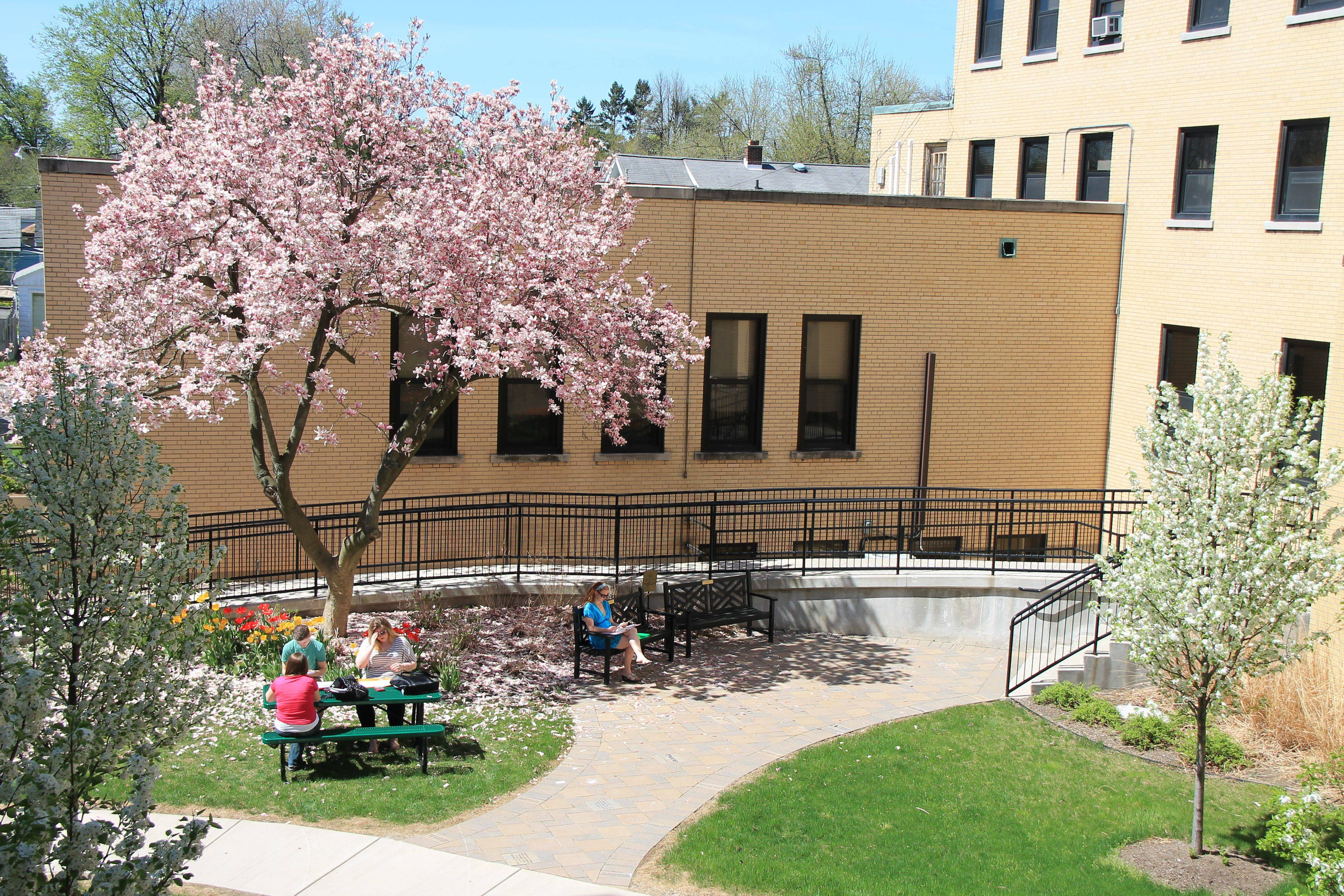
- Trocaire College Main Campus Courtyard
- Former name: Sancta Maria College
- Motto: Careers of achievement, lives of purpose.
- Type: Private college
- Established: 1958
- Religious affiliation: Roman Catholic (Sisters of Mercy)
- Academic affiliations: ACCU, NAICU
- President: Bassam M. Deeb
- Vice-president: Richard T. Linn
- Academic staff: 27 FT/ 130 PT (2024)
- Students: 1,069 (2024)
- Location: Buffalo, New York, U.S. 42.8466°N 78.81238°W
- Colours: Red, grey and gold
- Website: www.trocaire.edu

Trocaire College is a private Catholic college in Buffalo, New York, United States. Founded in 1958 by the Sisters of Mercy, Trocaire College offers degrees in healthcare, business, and technology. It has an extension site in Williamsville, New York. Total enrollment across both locations is approximately 1,069 students.

== History ==
Trocaire was founded in 1958 by the Sisters of Mercy as Sancta Maria College to train women of the order. In 1965 it admitted laywomen and in 1967 the college was renamed Trocaire College. The word 'trócaire' means 'mercy' in the Irish language. This is an homage to the religious order which founded the college, the Sisters of Mercy, who were founded in Dublin, Ireland in 1831.

In 1972, the college enrolled male students for the first time and it became co-educational. That same year it was given an absolute charter from the New York State Education Department.

In 2012, it opened a second located on Seneca Street, that later closed.

In August 2022, Trocaire and Medaille University signed a cooperative agreement. In January 2023, Trocaire purchased six buildings from Medaille. In April 2023, interim Medaille University President Lori Quigley announced that Trocaire College would be acquiring Medaille on July 31, 2023. In May 2023, Trocaire College President Bassam Deeb announced the deal had been call off.

In July 2026, the president of the college, Bassam M. Deeb, annouced that he was retiring and that the college was looking to move to another location.

== Academics ==
Trocaire College offers certificate, associate's degree, and bachelor's degree programs in healthcare, business, and technology. It focuses on offering career-oriented programs in growing fields. The college is home to the oldest private Associate's Degree in Nursing program in western New York.

== Presidents ==
1. Mary Vincentia Vossler (1958–1966)
2. Mary Paracleta Shalloe
3. Mary Carmina Coppola (circa 1980)
4. Barbara Ciarico (1988–1998)
5. Paul B. Hurley, Jr. (1999–2012)
6. Bassam Deeb (2012–present)
