= North Carolina Central Eagles =

Intercollegiate sports teams of North Carolina Central University

- University: North Carolina Central University
- Conference: MEAC (primary); NEC (men's & women's golf)
- NCAA: Division I (FCS)
- Athletic director: Dr. Louis "Skip" Perkins
- Location: Durham, North Carolina
- Varsity teams: 14
- Football stadium: O'Kelly-Riddick Stadium
- Basketball arena: McDougald-McLendon Gymnasium
- Baseball stadium: Durham Athletic Park
- Mascot: Eddie
- Nickname: Eagles
- Colors: Maroon and gray
- Website: nccueaglepride.com
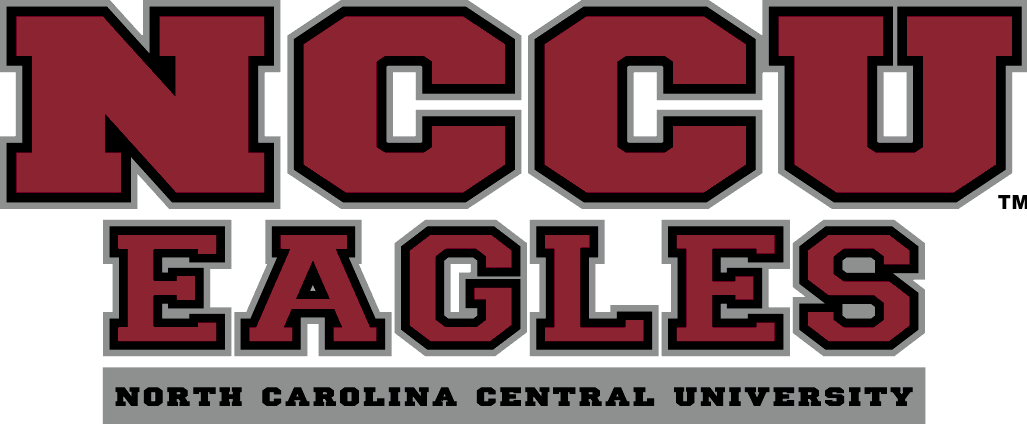

The North Carolina Central Eagles refer to the 14 sports teams representing North Carolina Central University (NCCU) in Durham, North Carolina in intercollegiate athletics, including men's and women's basketball, cross country, tennis, and track and field; women's sports include bowling, softball, and volleyball, while men's sports include golf. The Eagles compete in the NCAA Division I Football Championship Subdivision (FCS) and are members of the Mid-Eastern Athletic Conference. As of the 2022–23 school year, men's and women's golf compete in the Northeast Conference.

== Sponsored sports ==
Men's sports	Women's sports
Basketball	Basketball
Cross country	Bowling
Football	Cross country
Golf	Softball
Tennis	Tennis
Track and field^{†}	Track and field^{†}
	Volleyball
† – Track and field includes both indoor and outdoor

In 2021, the school announced that baseball would be dropped as a sponsored sport after the 2021 season.

== Championships ==
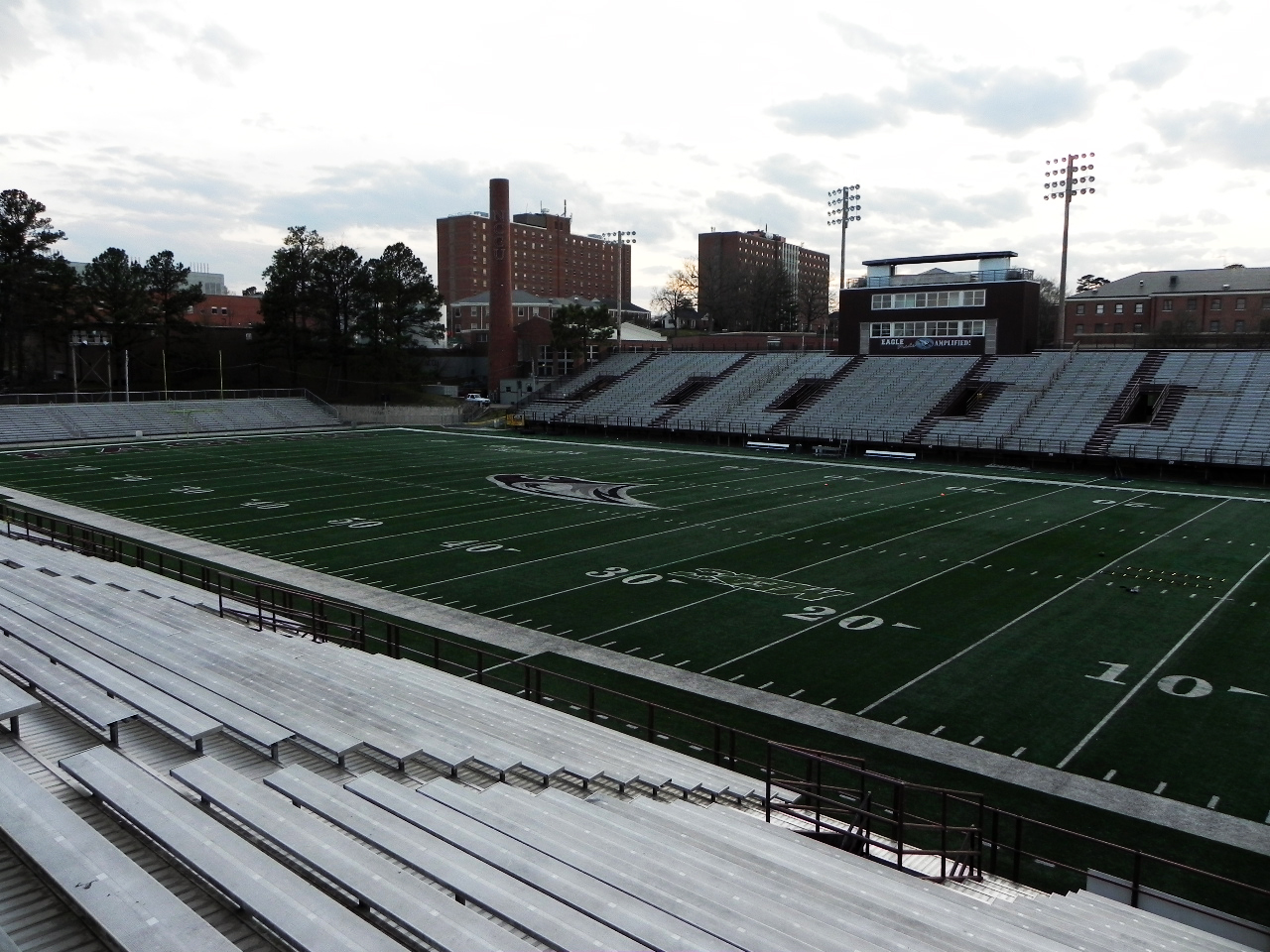
NCCU's O'Kelly-Riddick Stadium home to the MEAC Division I FCS Eagles

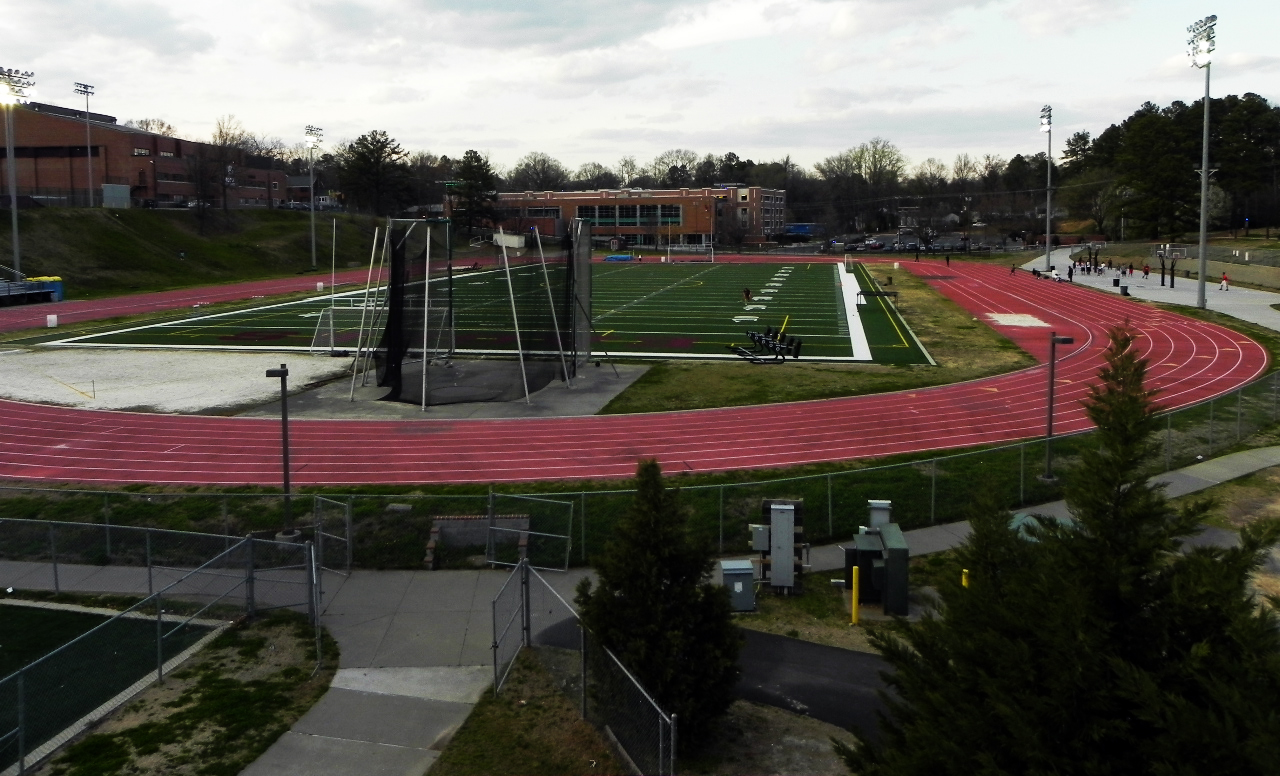
NCCU's track and soccer

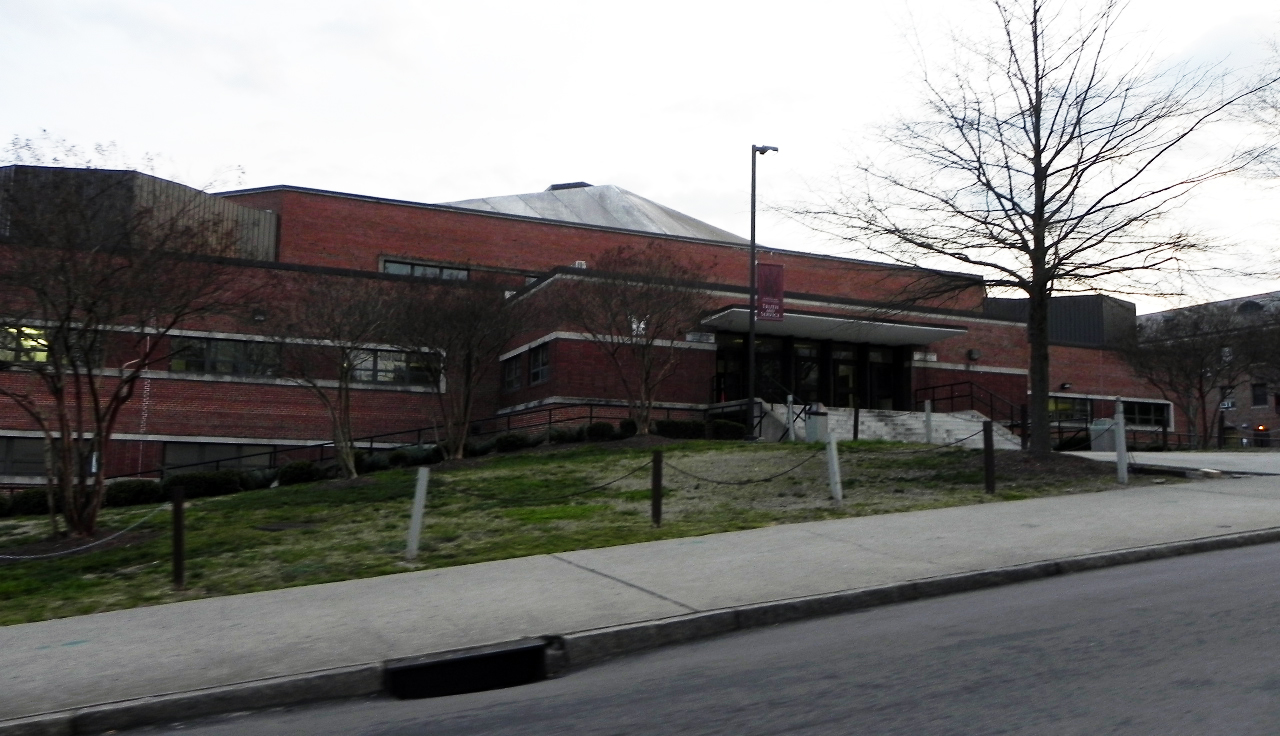
NCCU's McLendon-McDougald Gymnasium home to the Eagles who are members of NCAA Division I MEAC

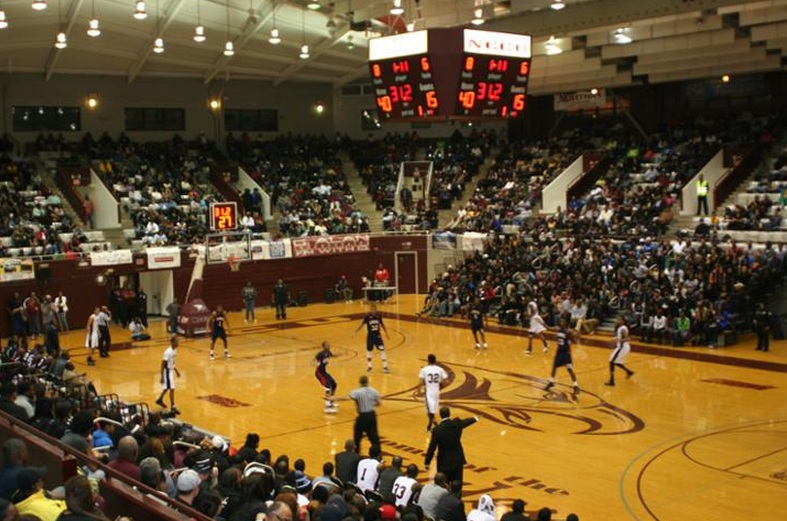
McLendon-McDougald Gymnasium

Men's Basketball
Central Intercollegiate Athletic Association Champions (CIAA)	1946, 1950
NCAA Division II Tournament Appearances	1957, 1988, 1989, 1990, 1993, 1996, 1997
NCAA Division II Regional Champions	1989, 1993
NCAA Division II National Champions	1989
Mid-Eastern Athletic Conference Champions (MEAC)	2014, 2015, 2017, 2020
Mid-Eastern Athletic Conference (MEAC) Tournament Champions	2014, 2017, 2018, 2019
Football
Central Intercollegiate Athletic Association Champions (CIAA)	1953, 1954, 1956, 1961, 1963, 1980, 2005, 2006
NCAA Division II Playoff Appearances	1988, 2005, 2006
Mid-Eastern Athletic Conference Champions (MEAC)	1972, 1973, 2014, 2015, 2016, 2022
Track and Field
Central Intercollegiate Athletic Association Champions (CIAA)	1964, 1965, 1971
Mid-Eastern Athletic Conference Champions (MEAC)	1972, 1973, 1974
NAIA National Champions	1972
Men's Tennis
Central Intercollegiate Athletic Association Champions (CIAA)	1957, 1958, 1959, 1964, 1965, 1998
Mid-Eastern Athletic Conference Champions (MEAC)	1972, 1973, 1974, 1975
Women's Volleyball
Central Intercollegiate Athletic Association Champions (CIAA)	1999, 2004, 2005, 2006
NCAA Division II Playoff Appearances	2004, 2005, 2006
Softball
Central Intercollegiate Athletic Association Champions (CIAA)	1998, 1999, 2006
NCAA Division II Playoff Appearances	2006, 2007
Mid-Eastern Athletic Conference Champions (MEAC)	2023
Women's Basketball
Central Intercollegiate Athletic Association Champions (CIAA)	1984, 2007
NCAA Division II Playoff Appearances	1984, 2001, 2002, 2006, 2007
Women's Cross Country
Central Intercollegiate Athletic Association Champions (CIAA)	2005, 2006
NCAA Division II Regional Champions	2006
Men's Cross Country
Central Intercollegiate Athletic Association Champions (CIAA)	2004
Women's Basketball
Central Intercollegiate Athletic Association Champions (CIAA)	2001
