= 2007 Mountain West Conference baseball tournament =

Baseball Tournament

- Teams: 6
- Format: Double-elimination
- Finals site: Earl Wilson Stadium; Paradise, NV
- Champions: TCU (2nd title)
- MVP: Austin Adams (TCU)
- Television: Mountiain/CBS Sports Network

2007 Mountain West Conference baseball standings
	Conf.				Overall
Team	W		L	PCT	W		L	PCT
No. 28 TCU ‍†‍‡‍^{y}	20	–	3	.870	48	–	14	.774
BYU ‍‍‍	17	–	7	.708	37	–	20	.649
San Diego State ‍‍‍	12	–	12	.500	29	–	30	.492
New Mexico ‍‍‍	12	–	12	.500	28	–	30	.483
Utah ‍‍‍	12	–	12	.500	24	–	31	.436
UNLV ‍‍‍	10	–	14	.417	23	–	36	.390
Air Force ‍‍‍	0	–	23	.000	8	–	44	.154
† – Conference champion ‡ – Tournament champion y – Invited to the 2007 NCAA Division I baseball tournament As of June 8, 2007; Rankings from Collegiate Baseball

The 2007 Mountain West Conference baseball tournament took place from May 23 through 26. The top six regular season finishers of the league's seven teams met in the double-elimination tournament held at University of Nevada, Las Vegas's Earl Wilson Stadium. Top seeded TCU won their second straight and second overall Mountain West Conference Baseball Championship with a championship game score of 9–8 and earned the conference's automatic bid to the 2007 NCAA Division I baseball tournament.

== Seeding ==
The top six finishers from the regular season were seeded one through six based on conference winning percentage only. Only six teams participate, so Air Force was not in the field.

Team	W	L	Pct.	GB	Seed
TCU	20	3	.870	–	1
BYU	17	7	.708	3.5	2
Utah	12	12	.500	8.5	3
San Diego State	12	12	.500	8.5	4
New Mexico	12	12	.500	8.5	5
UNLV	10	14	.417	10.5	6
Air Force	0	23	.000	20	–

== Results ==
Upper round 1	Upper round 2	Upper final	Final
1	TCU	8
3	Utah	3	6	UNLV	1
6	UNLV	6	1	TCU	8
2	BYU	7
2	BYU	5
4	San Diego State	0	5	New Mexico	3
5	New Mexico	1
1	TCU	9	9
2	BYU	10	8
Lower round 1	Lower round 2	Lower round 3	Lower final
2	BYU	10
6	UNLV	8	6	UNLV	9
5	New Mexico	4	5	New Mexico	3
3	Utah	1	4	San Diego State	1
4	San Diego State	12

== All-Tournament Team ==
Name	POS	Team
Kasey Ko	1B	BYU
Steve Parker	3B	BYU
Stephen Wells	OF	BYU
Bobby LaFromboise	P	New Mexico
Steven Hirschfeld	P	San Diego State
Efren Navarro, Jr.	1B	UNLV
Austin Adams	OF	TCU
Clint Arnold	OF	TCU
Keith Conlon	OF	TCU
Tyler Lockwood	RP	TCU
Apana Nakayama	DH	BYU

=== Most Valuable Player ===
Austin Adams, an outfielder for the champion TCU Horned Frogs, was named the tournament Most Valuable Player.
