= Mountain West Conference baseball tournament =

- Conference baseball championship
- Sport: Baseball
- Conference: Mountain West Conference
- Number of teams: 6
- Format: Double-elimination tournament
- Current stadium: Sloan Park
- Current location: Mesa, AZ
- Played: 2000–present
- Last contest: 2026
- Current champion: Washington State
- Most championships: San Diego State (6)
- TV partner: Mountain West Network
- Official website: The MW baseball championship

The Mountain West Conference baseball tournament is the conference championship tournament in baseball for the Mountain West Conference. The winner of the tournament receives the conference's automatic bid to the NCAA Division I baseball tournament.

== Tournament ==
The Mountain West Conference baseball tournament is a six-team double-elimination tournament held annually at various locations in the Mountain West Conference region. The winner receives an automatic bid to the NCAA Division I baseball tournament. Other teams may receive an at-large tournament bid.

== History ==
The Mountain West Conference baseball tournament began in 2000 as a six-team double-elimination tournament. It maintained that format through 2005. In 2006, with the addition of TCU, the tournament expanded to include all seven teams. However, in 2007 the format returned to a six-team bracket, with the seventh-place regular season team left out of the field. In 2012, with only five teams in the league, the tournament consisted of a four-team double elimination tournament. While they did have a regular season champion in 2021, they had no tournament.

In 2024, Washington State University joined the conference as an affiliate member, bringing the baseball membership total to eight teams. This caused the format to change again, allowing the top six teams in the regular season to participate in the tournament.

In 2025, Grand Canyon University joined the conference, bringing the membership total to nine. This addition did not change the conference tournament setup.

On July 1, 2026, full members San Diego State and Fresno State, along with affiliate member Washington State, will leave to become charter members of the reformed Pac-12 Conference. On the same day, Hawaii and UC Davis will leave the Big West conference to join the Mountain West as full members, and Utah Tech will join as an affiliate member.

== Champions ==
=== By year ===
Year	Champion	Runner-up	Site	MVP
2000	San Diego State	Air Force	Earl Wilson Stadium • Las Vegas, NV	Chad Redfern, San Diego State
2001	BYU	San Diego State	Tony Gwynn Stadium • San Diego, CA	Nate Fernley, BYU
2002	BYU	San Diego State	Larry H. Miller Field • Provo, UT	Doug Jackson, BYU
2003	UNLV	San Diego State	Isotopes Park • Albuquerque, NM	Patrick Dobson, UNLV
2004	UNLV	San Diego State	Earl Wilson Stadium • Las Vegas, NV	Matt Luca, UNLV
2005	UNLV	BYU	Franklin Covey Field • Salt Lake City, UT	Matt Wagner, UNLV
2006	TCU	BYU	Earl Wilson Stadium • Las Vegas, NV	Chad Huffman, TCU
2007	TCU	BYU	Earl Wilson Stadium • Las Vegas, NV	Austin Adams, TCU
2008	TCU	New Mexico	Lupton Stadium • Fort Worth, TX	Clint Arnold, TCU
2009	Utah	San Diego State	Lupton Stadium • Fort Worth, TX	Tyler Yagi, Utah
2010	TCU	New Mexico	Tony Gwynn Stadium • San Diego, CA	Bryan Holaday, TCU
2011	New Mexico	TCU	Tony Gwynn Stadium • San Diego, CA	D.J. Peterson, New Mexico
2012	New Mexico	San Diego State	Earl Wilson Stadium • Las Vegas, NV	Josh Melendez, New Mexico
2013	San Diego State	New Mexico	Pete Beiden Field • Fresno, CA	Ty France, San Diego State
2014	San Diego State	UNLV	Earl Wilson Stadium • Las Vegas, NV	Brad Haynal, San Diego State
2015	San Diego State	New Mexico	William Peccole Park • Reno, NV	Seby Zavala, San Diego State
2016	New Mexico	Nevada	Santa Ana Star Field • Albuquerque, NM	Colton Thomson, New Mexico; Luis González, New Mexico
2017	San Diego State	Fresno State	Falcon Baseball Field • Colorado Springs, CO	Andrew Martinez, San Diego State
2018	San Diego State	UNLV	Tony Gwynn Stadium • San Diego, CA	Casey Schmitt, San Diego State
2019	Fresno State	UNLV	William Peccole Park • Reno, NV	Ryan Jensen, Fresno State
2020	Cancelled due to the coronavirus pandemic			
2021	Cancelled due to the coronavirus pandemic			
2022	Air Force	San Jose State	Tony Gwynn Stadium • San Diego, CA	Paul Skenes, Air Force
2023	San Jose State	Air Force	Pete Beiden Field • Fresno, CA	Robert Hamchuk, San Jose State
2024	Fresno State	San Jose State	Tony Gwynn Stadium • San Diego, CA	Murf Gray, Fresno State
2025	Fresno State	San Jose State	Sloan Park • Mesa, AZ	Murf Gray, Fresno State
2026	Washington State	San Diego State	Sloan Park • Mesa, AZ	Gavin Roy, Washington State

=== By school ===
School	Championships	Title Years
San Diego State	6	2000, 2013, 2014, 2015, 2017, 2018
TCU	4	2006, 2007, 2008, 2010
New Mexico	3	2011, 2012, 2016
UNLV	3	2003, 2004, 2005
Fresno State	3	2019, 2024, 2025
BYU	2	2001, 2002
Utah	1	2009
Air Force	1	2022
San Jose State	1	2023
Washington State	1	2026

- Schools highlighted in pink indicate that the program is no longer a Mountain West member.

Of current members, Nevada is the only to not win a Mountain West tournament.
