= 2004 Mountain West Conference baseball tournament =

- Teams: 6
- Format: Double-elimination
- Finals site: Earl Wilson Stadium; Paradise, NV
- Champions: UNLV (2nd title)
- MVP: Matt Luca (UNLV)

2004 Mountain West Conference baseball standings
	Conf.						Overall
Team	W		L		T	PCT	W		L		T	PCT
San Diego State ‍†‍‍	19	–	9	–	0	.679	35	–	29	–	0	.547
New Mexico ‍‍‍	20	–	10	–	0	.667	36	–	29	–	1	.553
UNLV ‍‍‡‍^{y}	20	–	10	–	0	.667	37	–	24	–	0	.607
BYU ‍‍‍	18	–	12	–	0	.600	28	–	30	–	0	.483
Utah ‍‍‍	11	–	19	–	0	.367	22	–	36	–	0	.379
Air Force ‍‍‍	0	–	28	–	0	.000	6	–	49	–	0	.109
† – Conference champion ‡ – Tournament champion y – Invited to the 2004 NCAA Division I baseball tournament As of June 30, 2004; Rankings from Collegiate Baseball

The 2004 Mountain West Conference baseball tournament took place from May 26 through 29. All six of the league's teams met in the double-elimination tournament held at University of Nevada, Las Vegas's Earl Wilson Stadium. Third seeded UNLV won their second straight and second overall Mountain West Conference Baseball Championship with a championship game score of 6–3 and earned the conference's automatic bid to the 2004 NCAA Division I baseball tournament.

== Seeding ==
The teams were seeded based on regular season conference winning percentage only. New Mexico claimed the second seed by winning the season series against UNLV.

Team	W	L	Pct.	GB	Seed
San Diego State	19	9	.679	–	1
New Mexico	20	10	.667	–	2
UNLV	20	10	.667	–	3
BYU	18	12	.600	2	4
Utah	11	19	.367	9	5
Air Force	0	28	.000	19	6

== Results ==
Upper round 1	Upper round 2	Upper final	Final
1	San Diego State	8
4	BYU	4	5	Utah	0
5	Utah	10	1	San Diego State	3
3	UNLV	14
2	New Mexico	9
3	UNLV	13	3	UNLV	15
6	Air Force	9
3	UNLV	6	–
1	San Diego State	3	–
Lower round 1	Lower round 2	Lower round 3	Lower final
1	San Diego State	24
5	Utah	8	2	New Mexico	8
2	New Mexico	23	2	New Mexico	9
4	BYU	3	6	Air Force	2
6	Air Force	5

== All-Tournament Team ==
The following players were named to the All-Tournament team.

Name	Class	Team
Clayton Couch	So.	Air Force
Josh Mader	Jr.	New Mexico
Rielly Embrey	Sr.	San Diego State
Scott Shoemaker	Sr.	San Diego State
Brick Ungricht	Fr.	San Diego State
Andrew D’Angelo	Sr.	UNLV
Eric Nielsen	Jr.	UNLV
Zeke Parraz	Jr.	UNLV
Ryan Ruiz	Sr.	UNLV
David Seccombe	Sr.	UNLV

=== Most Valuable Player ===
Matt Luca, a sophomore pitcher for the champion UNLV Rebels, was named the tournament Most Valuable Player.
