= 2006 Mountain West Conference baseball tournament =

- Teams: 6
- Format: Double-elimination
- Finals site: Earl Wilson Stadium; Paradise, NV
- Champions: TCU (1st title)
- MVP: Chad Huffman (TCU)
- Television: Mountiain/CBS Sports Network

2006 Mountain West Conference baseball standings
	Conf.				Overall
Team	W		L	PCT	W		L	PCT
TCU ‍†‍‡‍^{y}	17	–	5	.773	39	–	23	.629
BYU ‍‍‍	14	–	8	.636	33	–	28	.541
San Diego State ‍‍‍	14	–	8	.636	23	–	36	.390
UNLV ‍‍‍	12	–	10	.545	20	–	30	.400
New Mexico ‍‍‍	10	–	12	.455	30	–	29	.508
Utah ‍‍‍	9	–	13	.409	28	–	28	.500
Air Force ‍‍‍	1	–	21	.045	10	–	38	.208
† – Conference champion ‡ – Tournament champion y – Invited to the 2006 NCAA Division I baseball tournament As of June 30, 2006; Rankings from Collegiate Baseball

The 2006 Mountain West Conference baseball tournament took place from May 23 through 27. All seven of the league's teams met in the double-elimination tournament held at University of Nevada, Las Vegas's Earl Wilson Stadium. In their first year in the league, top seeded TCU won their first Mountain West Conference Baseball Championship with a championship game score of 9–6 and earned the conference's automatic bid to the 2006 NCAA Division I baseball tournament.

== Seeding ==
The teams were seeded based on regular season conference winning percentage only. BYU claimed the second seed over San Diego State by winning the season series between the two teams.

Team	W	L	Pct.	GB	Seed
TCU	17	5	.773	–	1
BYU	14	8	.636	3	2
San Diego State	14	8	.636	3	3
UNLV	12	10	.545	5	4
New Mexico	10	12	.455	7	5
Utah	9	13	.409	8	6
Air Force	1	21	.045	16	7

== Results ==
Date	Game	Winner	Score	Loser	Notes
May 23	1	#6 Utah	8–5	#3 San Diego State	
May 23	2	#2 BYU	7–5	#7 Air Force	
May 23	3	#5 New Mexico	17–2	#4 UNLV	
May 24	4	#3 San Diego State	26–1	#7 Air Force	Air Force eliminated
May 24	5	#2 BYU	9–8	#6 Utah	
May 24	6	#4 UNLV	8–5	#3 San Diego State	San Diego State eliminated
May 24	7	#1 TCU	18–6	#5 New Mexico	
May 25	8	#5 New Mexico	12–10	#6 Utah	Utah eliminated
May 25	9	#1 TCU	13–6	#2 BYU	
May 25	10	#4 UNLV	8–6	#5 New Mexico	New Mexico eliminated
May 26	11	#2 BYU	10–4	#4 UNLV	UNLV eliminated
May 27	12	#1 TCU	9–6	#2 BYU	TCU wins tournament

== All-Tournament Team ==
Name	POS	Team
Stetson Banks	2B	BYU
Jeff Hiestand	1B	BYU
Patrick Wells	RHP	BYU
Chris Carlson	DH	New Mexico
Danny Ray Herrera	LHP	New Mexico
Brad Furnish	LHP	TCU
Ryan Pack	OF	TCU
Andrew Walker	C	TCU
Ryan Khoury	SS	Utah
Steven Trout	DH	TCU
Jabe Beard	RP	UNLV

=== Most Valuable Player ===
Chad Huffman, a first baseman for the champion TCU Horned Frogs, was named the tournament Most Valuable Player.
