= 2000 Mountain West Conference baseball tournament =

- Teams: 6
- Format: Double-elimination
- Finals site: Earl Wilson Stadium; Paradise, NV
- Champions: San Diego State (1st title)
- MVP: Chad Redfern (San Diego State)

2000 Mountain West Conference baseball standings
	Conf.				Overall
Team	W		L	PCT	W		L	PCT
New Mexico ‍†‍‍	22	–	8	.733	35	–	21	.625
San Diego State ‍‍‡‍	17	–	12	.586	34	–	28	.548
BYU ‍‍‍	15	–	15	.500	29	–	29	.500
Utah ‍‍‍	15	–	15	.500	26	–	30	.464
UNLV ‍‍‍	14	–	16	.467	24	–	33	.421
Air Force ‍‍‍	6	–	23	.207	23	–	34	.404
† – Conference champion ‡ – Tournament champion y – Invited to the 2000 NCAA Division I baseball tournament As of June 30, 2000; Rankings from Collegiate Baseball

The 2000 Mountain West Conference baseball tournament took place from May 17 through 20. This was the first championship tournament for the conference, which was formed prior to the 2000 NCAA Division I baseball season. All six of the league's teams met in the double-elimination tournament held at University of Nevada, Las Vegas's Earl Wilson Stadium. Second seeded San Diego State won the inaugural Mountain West Conference Baseball Championship with a championship game score of 9–4. As the Mountain West was a new league, they did not possess an automatic bid to the 2000 NCAA Division I baseball tournament, and no conference team was invited.

== Seeding ==
The teams were seeded based on regular season conference winning percentage only. BYU claimed the third seed over Utah by winning the season series.

Team	W	L	Pct.	GB	Seed
New Mexico	22	8	.733	–	1
San Diego State	17	12	.586	4.5	2
BYU	15	15	.500	7	3
Utah	15	15	.500	7	4
UNLV	14	16	.467	8	5
Air Force	6	23	.207	15.5	6

== Results ==
First round
1	New Mexico	17
6	Air Force	3
3	BYU	9
4	Utah	6
2	San Diego State	7
5	UNLV	6

Second round
1	New Mexico	4
4	Utah	6
6	Air Force	13
5	UNLV	11
3	BYU	5
2	San Diego State	6
1	New Mexico	3
3	BYU	6

Third round
4	Utah	5
6	Air Force	10
2	San Diego State	11
3	BYU	7

Final
6	Air Force	4	–
2	San Diego State	9	–

== All-Tournament Team ==
The following teams were named to the All-Tournament team.

Name	Class	POS	Team
Gerremy Goldsberry	Jr.	OF	Air Force
Mike Thiessen	Jr.	OF	Air Force
Michael Tufte	Jr.	RHP	Air Force
Matt Carson	Fr.	OF	BYU
Michael Davies	So.	C	BYU
Mark Okano	Jr.	OF	New Mexico
Billy Montgomery	Jr.	OF	San Diego State
Chad Redfern	Fr.	OF	San Diego State
Ryan Olson	So.	LHP	UNLV

=== Most Valuable Player ===
Chad Redfern, an outfielder for the champion San Diego State Aztecs, was named the tournament Most Valuable Player.
