= 2003 Mountain West Conference baseball tournament =

- Teams: 6
- Format: Double-elimination
- Finals site: Isotopes Park; Albuquerque, NM
- Champions: UNLV (1st title)
- MVP: Patrick Dobson (UNLV)

2003 Mountain West Conference baseball standings
	Conf.				Overall
Team	W		L	PCT	W		L	PCT
UNLV ‍†‍‡‍^{y}	24	–	6	.800	47	–	17	.734
BYU ‍‍‍	18	–	12	.600	30	–	24	.556
San Diego State ‍‍‍	18	–	12	.600	29	–	32	.475
New Mexico ‍‍‍	17	–	13	.567	34	–	26	.567
Utah ‍‍‍	10	–	20	.333	24	–	32	.429
Air Force ‍‍‍	3	–	27	.100	15	–	39	.278
† – Conference champion ‡ – Tournament champion y – Invited to the 2003 NCAA Division I baseball tournament As of June 30, 2003; Rankings from Collegiate Baseball

The 2003 Mountain West Conference baseball tournament took place from May 21 through 24. All six of the league's teams met in the double-elimination tournament held at University of New Mexico's Isotopes Park. Top seeded UNLV won their first Mountain West Conference Baseball Championship with a championship game score of 14–9 and earned the conference's automatic bid to the 2003 NCAA Division I baseball tournament.

== Seeding ==
The teams were seeded based on regular season conference winning percentage only. San Diego State claimed the second seed over BYU by winning the season series.

Team	W	L	Pct.	GB	Seed
UNLV	24	6	.800	–	1
San Diego State	18	12	.600	6	2
BYU	18	12	.600	6	3
New Mexico	17	13	.567	7	4
Utah	10	20	.333	14	5
Air Force	3	27	.100	21	6

== Results ==
First round
1	UNLV	10
6	Air Force	1
2	San Diego State	7
5	Utah	4
3	BYU	7
4	New Mexico	6

Second round
1	UNLV	12
4	New Mexico	5
2	San Diego State	6
3	BYU	0
5	Utah	7*
6	Air Force	6*

Third round
1	UNLV	13
2	San Diego State	1
3	BYU	7
5	Utah	6

Semifinals
2	San Diego State	15
3	BYU	7

Final
1	UNLV	14	–
2	San Diego State	9	–

* - Indicates game required 11 innings.

== All-Tournament Team ==
The following teams were named to the All-Tournament team.

Name	Class	Team	POS
Patrick Dobson	Jr.	UNLV	Outfielder
Jordan Swaydan	Fr.	SDSU	Catcher
Robert Van Kirk	Sr.	UNLV	Catcher
Cort Wilson	Jr.	Utah	Infielder
Eric Nielsen	So.	UNLV	Outfielder
Brock Jacobsen	Jr.	BYU	Outfielder
Jake Vose	Jr.	UNLV	Pitcher
Eddie Gill	Jr.	UNLV	Designated Hitter
Anthony Gwynn	Jr.	SDSU	Outfielder
Brady Martinez	So.	Utah	Relief Pitcher
Landon Burt	Jr.	SDSU	Outfielder

=== Most Valuable Player ===
Patrick Dobson, an outfielder for the champion UNLV Rebels, was named the tournament Most Valuable Player, after a 3 for 5, 2 RBI performance in the championship game, setting a tournament record for RBI at 14.
