= 2009 Mountain West Conference baseball tournament =

- Teams: 6
- Format: Double-elimination
- Finals site: Lupton Stadium; Fort Worth, TX
- Champions: Utah (1st title)
- MVP: Tyler Yagi (Utah)
- Television: Mountiain/CBS Sports Network

2009 Mountain West Conference baseball standings
	Conf.				Overall
Team	W		L	PCT	W		L	PCT
No. 17 TCU ‍†‍‍^{y}	15	–	5	.750	40	–	18	.690
New Mexico ‍‍‍	15	–	8	.652	37	–	20	.649
BYU ‍‍‍	14	–	8	.636	30	–	24	.556
San Diego State ‍‍‍^{y}	15	–	9	.625	41	–	23	.641
UNLV ‍‍‍	9	–	15	.375	26	–	32	.448
Utah ‍‍‡‍^{y}	8	–	16	.333	28	–	31	.475
Air Force ‍‍‍	3	–	18	.143	14	–	37	.275
† – Conference champion ‡ – Tournament champion y – Invited to the 2009 NCAA Division I baseball tournament As of June 8, 2009; Rankings from Collegiate Baseball

The 2009 Mountain West Conference baseball tournament took place from May 19 through 23. The top six regular season finishers of the league's seven teams met in the double-elimination tournament held at Texas Christian University's Lupton Stadium. Sixth seeded Utah won their first and only Mountain West Conference Baseball Championship with a championship game score of 9–3 and earned the conference's automatic bid to the 2009 NCAA Division I baseball tournament. Utah joined the Pac-12 Conference after the 2011 season without winning another title.

== Seeding ==
The top six finishers from the regular season were seeded one through six based on conference winning percentage only. Only six teams participate, so Air Force was not in the field.

Team	W	L	Pct.	GB	Seed
TCU	15	5	.750	–	1
New Mexico	15	8	.652	1.5	2
BYU	14	8	.636	2	3
San Diego State	15	9	.625	2	4
UNLV	9	15	.375	8	5
Utah	8	16	.333	9	6
Air Force	3	18	.143	12.5	–

== Results ==
Upper round 1	Upper round 2	Upper final	Final
1	TCU	7
3	BYU	1	6	Utah	9
6	Utah	2	6	Utah	8
4	San Diego State	9
2	New Mexico	1
4	San Diego State	12	4	San Diego State	2
5	UNLV	1
6	Utah	4	9
4	San Diego State	1	3
Lower round 1	Lower round 2	Lower round 3	Lower final
6	Utah	6
1	TCU	9	1	TCU	4
2	New Mexico	1	3	BYU	2
3	BYU	5	3	BYU	5
5	UNLV	4

== All-Tournament Team ==
Name	POS	Team
Marc Oslund	RHP	BYU
Matt Vern	1B	TCU
Kyle Winkler	RHP	TCU
Erik Castro	3B/C	San Diego State
Stephen Strasburg	RHP	San Diego State
C. J. Cron	C/DH	Utah
Corey Shimada	2B	Utah
Jordan Whatcott	RHP	Utah
Tyler Yagi	OF	Utah
Devin Walker	DH	Utah
Greg Krause	RP	Utah

=== Most Valuable Player ===
Tyler Yagi, an outfielder for the champion Utah Utes, was named the tournament Most Valuable Player.
