= 2022 Mountain West Conference baseball tournament =

- Teams: 4
- Format: Double-elimination
- Finals site: Tony Gwynn Stadium; San Diego
- Champions: Air Force Falcons (1st title)
- Winning coach: Mike Kazlausky (1st title)
- MVP: Paul Skenes (Air Force)
- Television: Stadium College Sports Central

2022 Mountain West Conference baseball standings
	Conf.				Overall
Team	W		L	PCT	W		L	PCT
UNLV ‍†‍‍	21	–	9	.700	36	–	22	.621
Nevada ‍‍‍	18	–	12	.600	29	–	26	.527
San Jose State ‍‍‍	16	–	14	.533	30	–	29	.508
Air Force ‍‍‡‍^{y}	15	–	15	.500	30	–	27	.526
Fresno State ‍‍‍	15	–	15	.500	27	–	28	.491
New Mexico ‍‍‍	10	–	20	.333	21	–	33	.389
San Diego State ‍‍‍	10	–	20	.333	18	–	38	.321
† – Conference champion ‡ – Tournament champion y – Invited to the NCAA tournament As of March 12, 2025; Rankings from D1Baseball

The 2022 Mountain West Conference baseball tournament will take place from May 26 through 29. The top four of the league's seven teams will meet in the double-elimination tournament to be held at Tony Gwynn Stadium in San Diego, California. The Air Force Falcons won the tournament and earned the Mountain West Conference's automatic bid to the 2022 NCAA Division I baseball tournament. It will be the Falcons' first time representing the Mountain West in the NCAA tournament and their first appearance overall since 1969.

== Format and seeding ==
The conference's top four teams will be seeded based on winning percentage during the round robin regular season schedule. They will then play a double-elimination tournament with the top seed playing the fourth seeded team and the second seeded team playing the third seed.

== Bracket ==
First round
1	UNLV	2
4	Air Force	5
2	Nevada	1
3	San Jose State	2
Lower round 1
1	UNLV	3
2	Nevada	7

Semi-finals
4	Air Force	7
3	San Jose State	3
Lower final
2	Nevada	6
3	San Jose State	15

Finals
4	Air Force	8	--
3	San Jose State	3	--
