= 2001 Mountain West Conference baseball tournament =

- Teams: 6
- Format: Double-elimination
- Finals site: Tony Gwynn Stadium; San Diego, CA
- Champions: BYU (1st title)
- MVP: Nate Fernley (BYU)

2001 Mountain West Conference baseball standings
	Conf.				Overall
Team	W		L	PCT	W		L	PCT
BYU ‍†‍‡‍^{y}	21	–	8	.724	38	–	22	.633
San Diego State ‍‍‍	19	–	11	.633	34	–	26	.567
Utah ‍‍‍	14	–	16	.467	27	–	29	.482
New Mexico ‍‍‍	14	–	16	.467	26	–	34	.433
UNLV ‍‍‍	13	–	17	.433	23	–	33	.411
Air Force ‍‍‍	8	–	21	.276	23	–	33	.411
† – Conference champion ‡ – Tournament champion y – Invited to the 2001 NCAA Division I baseball tournament As of June 30, 2001; Rankings from Collegiate Baseball

The 2001 Mountain West Conference baseball tournament took place from May 16 through 19. This was the second tournament held by the league. All six of the league's teams met in the double-elimination tournament held at San Diego State University's Tony Gwynn Stadium. Top seeded BYU won their first Mountain West Conference Baseball Championship with a championship game score of 4–3 and earned the conference's new automatic bid to the 2001 NCAA Division I baseball tournament.

== Seeding ==
The teams were seeded based on regular season conference winning percentage only. Utah claimed the third seed over New Mexico by winning the season series.

Team	W	L	Pct.	GB	Seed
BYU	21	8	.724	–	1
San Diego State	19	11	.633	2.5	2
Utah	14	16	.467	7.5	3
New Mexico	14	16	.467	7.5	4
UNLV	13	17	.433	8.5	5
Air Force	8	21	.276	13	6

== Results ==
First round
1	BYU	7
6	Air Force	1
3	Utah	4
4	New Mexico	7
2	San Diego State	0
5	UNLV	1

Second round
1	BYU	14
3	Utah	15
2	San Diego State	5
3	Utah	4
4	New Mexico	5
5	UNLV	2
1	BYU	10
5	UNLV	9

Third round
3	Utah	4
2	San Diego State	5
4	New Mexico	7
1	BYU	12

Semifinals
2	San Diego State	12
4	New Mexico	5

Final
2	San Diego State	3
1	BYU	4

== All-Tournament Team ==
The following teams were named to the All-Tournament team.

Name	Class	Team
Kainoa Obrey	So.	BYU
Ben Julianel	Sr.	SDSU
Ryan Olson	Jr.	UNLV
Chris Shelton	Jr.	Utah
Brad Beasley	Sr.	UNLV
Doug Jackson	So.	BYU
Ben Leuthard	Jr.	SDSU
Seth King	Sr.	BYU
Nate Fernley	Sr.	BYU
Trent Kitsch	Sr.	UNLV
John Skinner	Sr.	SDSU

=== Most Valuable Player ===
Nate Fernley, a pitcher for the champion BYU Cougars, was named the tournament Most Valuable Player after his complete game victory in the championship game.
