= 2005 Mountain West Conference baseball tournament =

- Teams: 6
- Format: Double-elimination
- Finals site: Franklin Covey Field; Salt Lake City, UT
- Champions: UNLV (3rd title)
- MVP: Matt Wagner (UNLV)

2005 Mountain West Conference baseball standings
	Conf.						Overall
Team	W		L		T	PCT	W		L		T	PCT
UNLV ‍†‍‡‍^{y}	23	–	7	–	0	.767	35	–	29	–	0	.547
BYU ‍‍‍	21	–	9	–	0	.700	39	–	19	–	1	.669
San Diego State ‍‍‍	17	–	13	–	0	.567	26	–	35	–	0	.426
New Mexico ‍‍‍	15	–	15	–	0	.500	26	–	32	–	0	.448
Utah ‍‍‍	10	–	20	–	0	.333	19	–	36	–	0	.345
Air Force ‍‍‍	4	–	26	–	0	.133	9	–	44	–	0	.170
† – Conference champion ‡ – Tournament champion y – Invited to the 2005 NCAA Division I baseball tournament As of June 30, 2005; Rankings from Collegiate Baseball

The 2005 Mountain West Conference baseball tournament took place from May 23 through 27. All six of the league's teams met in the double-elimination tournament held at University of Utah's Franklin Covey Field. Top seeded UNLV won their third straight and third overall Mountain West Conference Baseball Championship with a championship game score of 7–4 and earned the conference's automatic bid to the 2005 NCAA Division I baseball tournament.

== Seeding ==
The teams were seeded based on regular season conference winning percentage only.

Team	W	L	Pct.	GB	Seed
UNLV	23	7	.767	–	1
BYU	21	9	.700	2	2
San Diego State	17	13	.567	6	3
New Mexico	15	15	.500	8	4
Utah	10	20	.333	13	5
Air Force	4	26	.133	19	6

== Results ==
Upper round 1	Upper round 2	Upper final	Final
1	UNLV	5
3	San Diego State	21	5	Utah	3
6	Air Force	6	1	UNLV	2
2	BYU	7
2	BYU	4
4	New Mexico	0	3	San Diego State	3
5	Utah	2
2	BYU	5	4
1	UNLV	9	7
Lower round 1	Lower round 2	Lower round 3	Lower final
1	UNLV	14
5	Utah	3	3	San Diego State	3
3	San Diego State	7	3	San Diego State	10
6	Air Force	9	4	New Mexico	5
4	New Mexico	11

== All-Tournament Team ==
Name	Class	POS	Team
Ryan Chambers	Sr.	OF	BYU
Dave Horlacher	Jr.	P	BYU
Chris Carlson	So.	OF	New Mexico
Quintin Berry	So.	OF	San Diego State
Lance Zawadzki	So.	2B	San Diego State
Ryan Bird	Jr.	OF	UNLV
Chris Bonnell	So.	1B	UNLV
Matt Luca	Jr.	P	UNLV
J. C. Sibley	Sr.	OF	UNLV
Josh Cooper	Jr.	P	Utah
Apana Nakayama	Jr.	DH	BYU

=== Most Valuable Player ===
Matt Wagner, a pitcher for the champion UNLV Rebels, was named the tournament Most Valuable Player.
