= 2016 Mountain West Conference baseball tournament =

- Teams: 7
- Format: Double-elimination
- Finals site: Santa Ana Star Field; Albuquerque, NM
- Television: MW Net

2016 Mountain West Conference baseball standings
	Conf.				Overall
Team	W		L	PCT	W		L	PCT
Fresno State ‍†‍‍	21	–	9	.700	36	–	22	.621
New Mexico ‍‍‡‍^{y}	20	–	10	.667	37	–	24	.607
Nevada ‍‍‍	20	–	10	.667	39	–	23	.629
UNLV ‍‍‍	14	–	16	.467	24	–	32	.429
Air Force ‍‍‍	12	–	18	.400	30	–	27	.526
San Diego State ‍‍‍	11	–	19	.367	21	–	38	.356
San Jose State ‍‍‍	7	–	23	.233	17	–	39	.304
† – Conference champion ‡ – Tournament champion y – Invited to the NCAA tournament As of June 11, 2016; Rankings from Collegiate Baseball

The 2016 Mountain West Conference baseball tournament will take place from May 25 through 29. All seven of the league's teams will meet in the double-elimination tournament to be held at University of New Mexico's Santa Ana Star Field. The winner of the tournament will earn the Mountain West Conference's automatic bid to the 2016 NCAA Division I baseball tournament.

== Format and seeding ==
The conference's seven teams will be seeded based on winning percentage during the round robin regular season schedule. The bottom two seeds will play a single-elimination game prior to the main six-team bracket. The top two seeds will receive a bye to the second round, with the top seed playing the lowest seeded team that won its first-round game, and the second seeded team playing the higher seeded first day winner. The losers of the first day's games will play an elimination game in the double-elimination format.

Team	W	L	Pct	GB	Seed
Fresno State	21	9	.700	—	1
New Mexico	20	10	.667	1	2
Nevada	20	10	.667	1	3
UNLV	14	16	.467	7	4
Air Force	12	18	.400	9	5
San Diego State	11	19	.367	10	6
San Jose State	7	23	.233	14	7

== Bracket ==
Team	R
#7 San Jose State	3
#6 San Diego State	7

Upper round 1	Upper round 2	Upper final	Final
1	Fresno State	7
3	Nevada	13	5	Air Force	9
6	San Diego State	6	5	Air Force	4
2	New Mexico	6
2	New Mexico	3
4	UNLV	7	3	Nevada	0
5	Air Force	15
2	New Mexico	14
3	Nevada	4
Lower round 1	Lower round 2	Lower round 3	Lower final
3	Nevada	12
1	Fresno State	6	5	Air Force	1
6	San Diego State	3	3	Nevada	25
6	San Diego State	18	3	Nevada	5
4	UNLV	8
