= 2014 Mountain West Conference baseball tournament =

- Teams: 7
- Format: Double-elimination
- Finals site: Earl E. Wilson Stadium; Paradise, Nevada
- Champions: San Diego State (3rd title)
- Winning coach: Tony Gwynn (2nd title)
- MVP: Brad Haynal (San Diego State)

2014 Mountain West Conference baseball standings
	Conf.						Overall
Team	W		L		T	PCT	W		L		T	PCT
UNLV ‍†‍‍^{y}	20	–	10	–	0	.667	36	–	25	–	0	.590
New Mexico ‍†‍‍	20	–	10	–	0	.667	37	–	20	–	1	.647
San Diego State ‍‍‡‍^{y}	17	–	13	–	0	.567	42	–	21	–	0	.667
Nevada ‍‍‍	15	–	15	–	0	.500	31	–	27	–	0	.534
Fresno State ‍‍‍	13	–	17	–	0	.433	28	–	29	–	0	.491
Air Force ‍‍‍	10	–	20	–	0	.333	20	–	34	–	0	.370
San Jose State ‍‍‍	10	–	20	–	0	.333	19	–	38	–	0	.333
† – Conference champion ‡ – Tournament champion y – Invited to the NCAA Division I Baseball Championship; As of June 1, 2014; Rankings from Collegiate Baseball

The 2014 Mountain West Conference baseball tournament took place from May 21 through 25. All seven of the league's teams met in the double-elimination tournament held at University of Nevada, Las Vegas's Earl E. Wilson Stadium. This is San Jose State's first year in the league after joining from the Western Athletic Conference. San Diego State won the tournament, earning the Mountain West's automatic bid to the 2014 NCAA Division I baseball tournament.

== Format and seeding ==
The conference's seven teams were seeded based on winning percentage during the round-robin regular season schedule. The bottom two seeds played a single-elimination game prior to the main six-team double-elimination bracket. The top two seeds received a bye to the second round, with the top seed playing the lowest seeded team that won its first round game, and the second seeded team playing the higher seeded first day winner. The losers of the first day's first-round games played an elimination game in the double-elimination format. The higher seeded loser of the second round games in the winner's bracket played an elimination game in the third round of the loser's bracket. The lower seeded loser of the second round games in the winner's bracket played an elimination game in the second round of the loser's bracket.

Team	W	L	Pct.	GB	Seed
UNLV	20	10	.667	–	1
New Mexico	20	10	.667	–	2
San Diego State	17	13	.567	3	3
Nevada	15	15	.500	4	4
Fresno State	13	17	.433	7	5
Air Force	10	20	.333	10	6
San Jose State	10	20	.333	10	7

- UNLV and New Mexico finished tied for first place and are Mountain West Conference regular-season co-champions. UNLV won 5 of the 6 games they played against New Mexico to take the #1 seed in the tournament.
- Air Force and San Jose State finished tied for sixth place. Air Force won 2 of the 3 games they played against San Jose State to take the #6 seed in the tournament.

== Bracket ==
Team	R
#7 San Jose State	11
#6 Air Force	3

Upper round 1	Upper round 2	Upper final	Final
1	UNLV	5
3	San Diego State	15	5	Fresno State	3
7	San Jose State	1	1	UNLV	5
3	San Diego State	4
2	New Mexico	5
4	Nevada	3	3	San Diego State	11
5	Fresno State	4
1	UNLV	1	3
3	San Diego State	9	4
Lower round 1	Lower round 2	Lower round 3	Lower final
4	Nevada	2
4	Nevada	9**	3	San Diego State	3*
4	Nevada	10	2	New Mexico	4
4	Nevada	4	5	Fresno State	2
7	San Jose State	0

- * 10 innings
- **11 innings

== All-Tournament Team ==
The following players were named to the All-Tournament Team.

Name	School	Class
Brad Haynal	San Diego State	Junior
Trenton Brooks	Nevada	Freshman
Scott Kaplan	Nevada	Senior
Greg Allen	San Diego State	Junior
Evan Potter	San Diego State	Senior
Brett Seeburger	San Diego State	Freshman
Kyle Gallegos	San Jose State	Senior
John Richy	UNLV	Junior
T.J. White	UNLV	Junior
Steven Pallares	San Diego State	Junior
Brayden Torres	UNLV	Sophomore

=== Most Valuable Player ===
San Diego State junior catcher Brad Haynal was named Tournament Most Valuable Player. Haynal was the leading hitter in the tournament batting .636 (14 for 22) and was also the leader in runs scored with nine.

=== Championship Game ===
The tournament came down to a final game between San Diego State and UNLV with each team having already lost once. With the game tied at 3 in the top of the sixth inning, shortstop Evan Potter's sacrifice fly pushed across the go-ahead run giving the Aztecs a 4–3 lead which their bullpen held. T.J. Kendzora pitched 1 2/3 hitless and scoreless innings in relief to record the win. Aztecs' third baseman Ty France had three hits, an RBI, a run scored and a stolen base. Michael Cederoth recorded his 20th save of the season which is both a Mountain West and a San Diego State school record.
