= 2013 Mountain West Conference baseball tournament =

- Teams: 6
- Format: Double-elimination
- Finals site: Pete Beiden Field; Fresno, CA
- Champions: San Diego State (2nd title)
- Winning coach: Tony Gwynn (1st title)
- MVP: Tyler France (San Diego State)

2013 Mountain West Conference baseball standings
	Conf.				Overall
Team	W		L	PCT	W		L	PCT
New Mexico ‍†‍‍^{y}	25	–	5	.833	37	–	22	.627
UNLV ‍‍‍	18	–	12	.600	37	–	20	.649
San Diego State ‍‍‡‍^{y}	15	–	15	.500	31	–	31	.500
Fresno State ‍‍‍	14	–	16	.467	23	–	33	.411
Nevada ‍‍‍	11	–	19	.367	25	–	32	.439
Air Force ‍‍‍	7	–	23	.233	15	–	39	.278
† – Conference champion ‡ – Tournament champion y – Invited to the NCAA tournament As of June 30, 2013; Rankings from Collegiate Baseball

The 2013 Mountain West Conference baseball tournament took place from May 22 through 26. All six of the league's teams met in the double-elimination tournament held at California State University, Fresno's Pete Beiden Field. It was Fresno State's first year in the league after joining from the Western Athletic Conference. San Diego State won the tournament for the second time, earning the Mountain West Conference's automatic bid to the 2013 NCAA Division I baseball tournament.

== Format and seeding ==
The conference's six teams were seeded based on winning percentage during the round robin regular season schedule. The top two seeds received a bye to the second round, with the top seed playing the lowest seeded team that won its first-round game, and the second seeded team playing the higher seeded first day winner. The losers of the first day's games played an elimination game in the double-elimination format.

Team	W	L	Pct.	GB	Seed
New Mexico	25	5	.833	–	1
UNLV	18	12	.600	7	2
San Diego State	15	15	.500	10	3
Fresno State	14	16	.467	11	4
Nevada	11	19	.367	14	5
Air Force	7	23	.233	18	6

== Bracket ==
Upper round 1	Upper round 2	Upper final	Final
1	New Mexico	7
3	San Diego State	15	5	Nevada	3
6	Air Force	6	1	New Mexico	7
2	UNLV	1
2	UNLV	6
4	Fresno State	3	3	San Diego State	3
5	Nevada	4
1	New Mexico	7	4
3	San Diego State	8	9
Lower round 1	Lower round 2	Lower round 3	Lower final
2	UNLV	2
4	Fresno State	0	3	San Diego State	6
5	Nevada	1	3	San Diego State	4
6	Air Force	4	4	Fresno State	10
4	Fresno State	6

== All-Tournament Team ==
The following players were named to the All-Tournament Team.

Name	School	Class
Greg Allen	San Diego State	Sophomore
Luke Campbell	New Mexico	Senior
Ryan Doran	San Diego State	Senior
Tyler France	San Diego State	Freshman
Mitch Garver	New Mexico	Senior
Seth Kline	Air Force	Junior
Tyler Linehan	Fresno State	Junior
D. J. Peterson	New Mexico	Junior
Michael RoBards	San Diego State	Sophomore
Philip Walby	San Diego State	Junior
Tim Zier	San Diego State	Junior

=== Most Valuable Player ===
Tyler France was named Tournament Most Valuable Player. France was a freshman for San Diego State.

=== Championship Winning Pitcher ===
Philip Walby of San Diego State was the Starting and Winning Pitcher of two games, including the Championship Game vs. New Mexico.
