= 2015 Mountain West Conference baseball tournament =

- Teams: 7
- Format: Double-elimination
- Finals site: William Peccole Park; Reno, Nevada
- Champions: San Diego State (4th title)

2015 Mountain West Conference baseball standings
	Conf.				Overall
Team	W		L	PCT	W		L	PCT
No. 29 Nevada ‍‍‍	21	–	6	.778	38	–	12	.760
San Diego State ‍‍‍	17	–	10	.630	32	–	18	.640
New Mexico ‍‍‍	13	–	11	.542	24	–	23	.511
Fresno State ‍‍‍	13	–	11	.542	24	–	25	.490
Air Force ‍‍‍	10	–	14	.417	21	–	24	.467
UNLV ‍‍‍	8	–	16	.333	22	–	25	.468
San Jose State ‍‍‍	5	–	19	.208	12	–	37	.245
‡ – Tournament champion As of May 6, 2015; Rankings from Collegiate Baseball

The 2015 Mountain West Conference baseball tournament took place from May 21 through 25. All seven of the league's teams met in the double-elimination tournament to be held at University of Nevada, Reno's William Peccole Park. The winner of the tournament earned the Mountain West Conference's automatic bid to the 2015 NCAA Division I baseball tournament.

== Format and seeding ==
The conference's seven teams were seeded based on winning percentage during the round robin regular season schedule. The bottom two seeds played a single-elimination game prior to the main six-team bracket. The top two seeds received a bye to the second round, with the top seed playing the lowest seeded team that won its first round game, and the second seeded team playing the higher seeded first day winner. The losers of the first day's games played an elimination game in the double-elimination format.

== Bracket ==
Tuesday, May 19
Team	R
#7 San Jose State	1
#6 UNLV	2

Upper round 1	Upper round 2	Upper final	Final
1	Nevada	4
3	Fresno State	6	4	New Mexico	14
6	UNLV	5	4	New Mexico	9
3	Fresno State	1
2	San Diego State	7
4	New Mexico	13	3	Fresno State	15
5	Air Force	1
4	New Mexico	1	4
2	San Diego State	11	6
Lower round 1	Lower round 2	Lower round 3	Lower final
2	San Diego State	7
1	Nevada	7	3	Fresno State	6
5	Air Force	2	2	San Diego State	9
6	UNLV	3	2	San Diego State	8
5	Air Force	4*
