= 2002 Mountain West Conference baseball tournament =

Sports competition

- Teams: 6
- Format: Double-elimination
- Finals site: Larry H. Miller Field; Provo, UT
- Champions: BYU (2nd title)
- MVP: Doug Jackson (BYU)

2002 Mountain West Conference baseball standings
	Conf.						Overall
Team	W		L		T	PCT	W		L		T	PCT
San Diego State ‍†‍‍	20	–	10	–	0	.667	43	–	23	–	0	.652
Utah ‍‍‍	16	–	14	–	0	.533	33	–	26	–	0	.559
BYU ‍‍‡‍^{y}	15	–	14	–	0	.517	31	–	31	–	1	.500
Air Force ‍‍‍	14	–	15	–	0	.483	27	–	28	–	0	.491
UNLV ‍‍‍	13	–	17	–	0	.433	30	–	30	–	0	.500
New Mexico ‍‍‍	11	–	19	–	0	.367	22	–	35	–	0	.386
† – Conference champion ‡ – Tournament champion y – Invited to the 2002 NCAA Division I baseball tournament As of June 30, 2002; Rankings from Collegiate Baseball

The 2002 Mountain West Conference baseball tournament took place from May 22 through 25. All six of the league's teams met in the double-elimination tournament held at Brigham Young University's Larry H. Miller Field. Top seeded BYU won their second consecutive and second overall Mountain West Conference Baseball Championship with a championship game score of 14–9 and earned the conference's automatic bid to the 2002 NCAA Division I baseball tournament.

== Seeding ==
The teams were seeded based on regular season conference winning percentage only.

Team	W	L	Pct.	GB	Seed
San Diego State	20	10	.667	–	1
Utah	16	14	.533	4	2
BYU	15	14	.517	4.5	3
Air Force	14	15	.483	5.5	4
UNLV	13	17	.433	7	5
New Mexico	11	19	.367	9	6

== Results ==
First round
1	San Diego State	8
6	New Mexico	2
3	BYU	18
4	Air Force	3
2	Utah	9
5	UNLV	13

Second round
1	San Diego State	9
4	Air Force	6
3	BYU	13
5	UNLV	11
2	Utah	9
6	New Mexico	8

Third round
1	San Diego State	11
3	BYU	10
5	UNLV	13
2	Utah	7

Semifinals
3	BYU	8
5	UNLV	7

Final
1	San Diego State	4	3
3	BYU	6	5

== All-Tournament Team ==
The following teams were named to the All-Tournament team.

Name	Class	Team	POS
Jake McLintock	Fr.	San Diego State	RF
Landon Burt	So.	San Diego State	LF
Anthony Gwynn	So.	San Diego State	CF
Cameron Coughlan	Jr.	BYU	2B
Doug Jackson	Jr.	BYU	OF
Jason Garcia	Jr.	BYU	P
Jake Stubblefield	Jr.	BYU	DH
Ranger Wiens	So.	BYU	SS
Matt Ciaramella	Fr.	Utah	CF
David Trujillo	Sr.	UNLV	DH
Royce Ring	Jr.	San Diego State	RP

=== Most Valuable Player ===
Doug Jackson, an outfielder for the champion BYU Cougars, was named the tournament Most Valuable Player.
