= 2012 Mountain West Conference baseball tournament =

- Teams: 4
- Format: Double-elimination
- Finals site: Earl Wilson Stadium; Paradise, NV
- Champions: New Mexico (2nd title)
- Television: Mountiain/CBS Sports Network

The 2012 Mountain West Conference baseball tournament took place from May 24 through 26. The top four regular season finishers of the league's five teams met in the double-elimination tournament held at University of Nevada, Las Vegas's Earl Wilson Stadium. New Mexico won their second Mountain West Conference Baseball Championship by a score of 22–3 and earned the conference's automatic bid to the 2012 NCAA Division I baseball tournament.

== Seeding ==
2012 Mountain West Conference baseball standings
	Conf.				Overall
Team	W		L	PCT	W		L	PCT
New Mexico ‍†‍‡‍^{y}	18	–	6	.750	36	–	19	.655
TCU ‍†‍‍^{y}	18	–	6	.750	36	–	22	.621
San Diego State ‍‍‍	12	–	12	.500	26	–	34	.433
UNLV ‍‍‍	7	–	17	.292	26	–	31	.456
Air Force ‍‍‍	5	–	19	.208	14	–	39	.264
† – Conference champion ‡ – Tournament champion y – Invited to the 2012 NCAA Division I baseball tournament As of May 27, 2012; Rankings from Coaches' Poll

The top four finishers from the home and home, round robin regular season will be seeded one through four.

Team	W	L	Pct.	GB	Seed
New Mexico	18	6	.750	–	1
TCU	18	6	.750	–	2
San Diego State	12	12	.500	6	3
UNLV	7	17	.292	11	4
Air Force	5	19	.208	13	–

== Results ==
First round
1	New Mexico	13
4	UNLV	0
2	TCU	16
3	San Diego State	15
Lower round 1
3	San Diego State	15
4	UNLV	9

Semi-finals
1	New Mexico	5
2	TCU	2
Lower final
2	TCU	11
3	San Diego State	12

Finals
1	New Mexico
3	San Diego State
