= 2011 Mountain West Conference baseball tournament =

- Teams: 6
- Format: Double-elimination
- Finals site: Tony Gwynn Stadium; San Diego, CA
- Champions: New Mexico (1st title)
- MVP: D.J. Peterson (New Mexico)
- Television: Mountiain/CBS Sports Network

The 2011 Mountain West Conference baseball tournament took place from May 24 through 28 The top six regular season finishers of the league's seven teams met in the double-elimination tournament held at San Diego State's Tony Gwynn Stadium. Sixth seeded New Mexico won their first Mountain West Conference Baseball Championship with a championship game score of 4–2 and earned the conference's automatic bid to the 2011 NCAA Division I baseball tournament.

== Seeding ==
2011 Mountain West Conference baseball standings
	Conf.				Overall
Team	W		L	PCT	W		L	PCT
No. 17 TCU ‍†‍‍^{y}	20	–	3	.870	43	–	19	.694
Utah ‍‍‍	16	–	7	.696	29	–	21	.580
BYU ‍‍‍	11	–	12	.478	31	–	27	.534
San Diego State ‍‍‍	11	–	13	.458	22	–	36	.379
UNLV ‍‍‍	10	–	13	.435	33	–	25	.569
New Mexico ‍‍‡‍^{y}	10	–	14	.417	20	–	41	.328
Air Force ‍‍‍	4	–	20	.167	19	–	36	.345
† – Conference champion ‡ – Tournament champion y – Invited to the 2011 NCAA Division I baseball tournament As of June 30, 2011; Rankings from Collegiate Baseball

The top six finishers from the regular season were seeded one through six based on conference winning percentage only. Only six teams participate, so Air Force was not in the field.

Team	W	L	Pct.	GB	Seed
TCU	20	3	.870	–	1
Utah	16	7	.696	4	2
BYU	11	12	.478	9	3
San Diego State	11	13	.458	9.5	4
UNLV	10	13	.435	10	5
New Mexico	10	14	.417	10.5	6
Air Force	4	20	.167	16.5	–

== Results ==
Upper round 1	Upper round 2	Upper final	Final
1	TCU	3
3	BYU	4	6	New Mexico	4
6	New Mexico	5	6	New Mexico	6
2	Utah	5
2	Utah	7
4	San Diego State	4	4	San Diego State	3
5	UNLV	3
6	New Mexico	4
1	TCU	2
Lower round 1	Lower round 2	Lower round 3	Lower final
2	Utah	1
1	TCU	12	1	TCU	14
4	San Diego State	2	3	BYU	5
3	BYU	5	3	BYU	8
5	UNLV	1

== All-Tournament Team ==
Pos.	Name	Class	Team
C	Josh Elander	SO	TCU
1B	Joe Weik	SR	TCU
2B	Dane Nielsen	SR	BYU
3B	D. J. Peterson (MVP)	FR	New Mexico
3B	Troy Neilsen	FR	Utah
LF	Luke Campbell	JR	New Mexico
CF	Cody Smith	FR	San Diego State
CF	Kyle Von Tungeln	SO	TCU
DH	Jacob Nelson	SO	New Mexico
RHP	Austin House	SO	New Mexico
RP	Bobby Mares	SO	New Mexico
