= D. J. Peterson (baseball) =

American baseball player (born 1991)

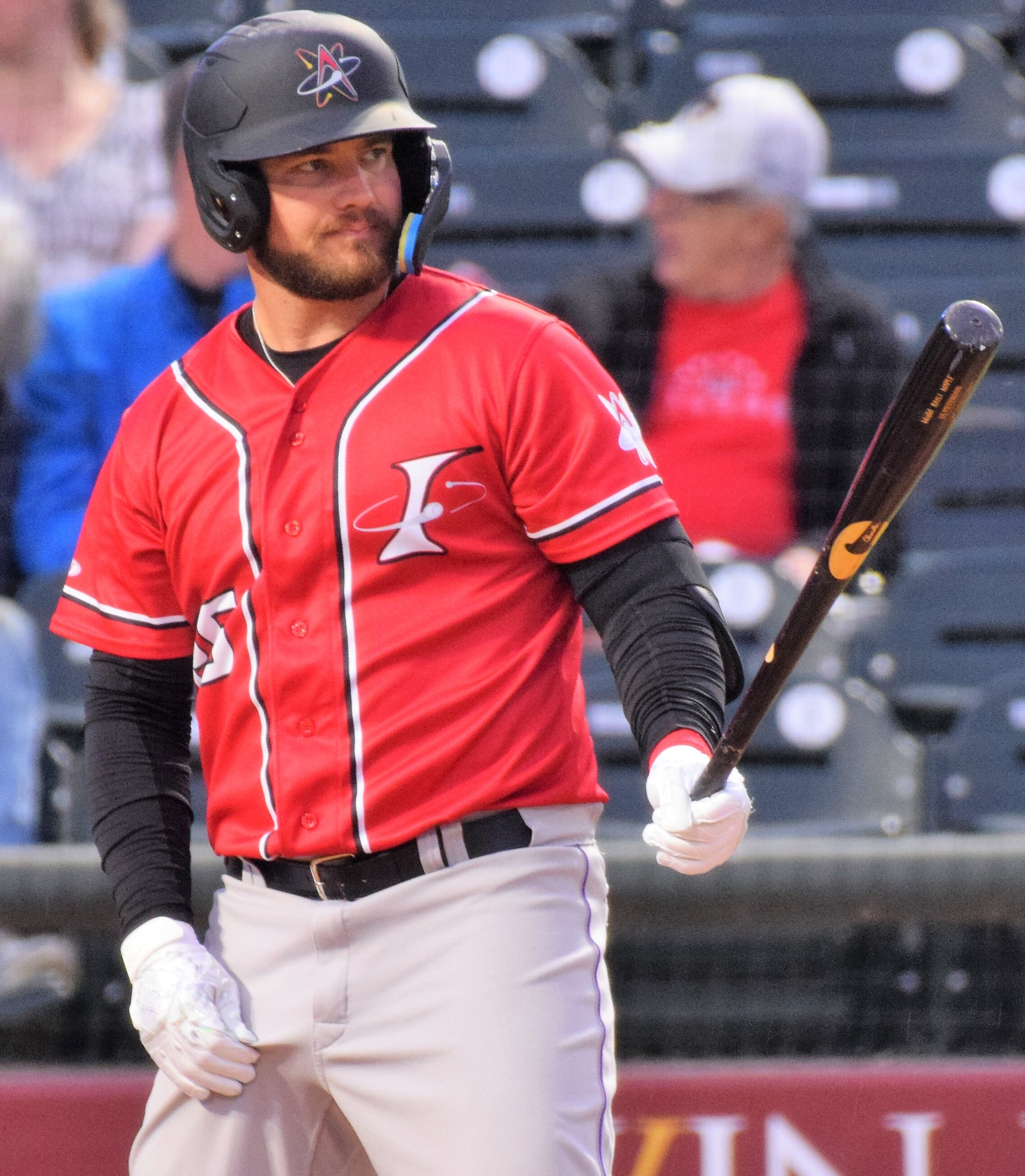
- Peterson with the Isotopes in 2022
- First baseman / Third baseman
- Born: December 31, 1991 (age 34); Chandler, Arizona, U.S.
- Bats: Right Throws: Right
- Stats at Baseball Reference
Medals
Men's baseball
Representing the United States
Haarlem Baseball Week
Bronze medal – third place	2012	Team

Douglas Anthony "D.J." Peterson (born December 31, 1991) is an American former professional baseball corner infielder. He was drafted by the Seattle Mariners 12th overall in the first round of the 2013 Major League Baseball draft out of the University of New Mexico, becoming the highest drafted player in school history. Despite spending time on the 40-man rosters of the Seattle Mariners, Chicago White Sox, and Cincinnati Reds, he never played in Major League Baseball (MLB).

== Career ==
=== Amateur ===
Peterson attended Gilbert High School in Gilbert, Arizona. He earned Louisville Slugger High School All-American honors. Peterson enrolled at the University of New Mexico to play college baseball for the New Mexico Lobos. As a freshman in 2011, Peterson led the Lobos in nearly every offensive category, earning Freshman All-American honors. He led the Lobos to the 2011 Mountain West Conference (MWC) baseball tournament championship, earning tournament most valuable player honors.

In 2012, Peterson improved upon his freshman season, leading the MWC in batting average, home runs, and runs batted in leading the Lobos to both the regular season and 2012 MWC baseball tournament championships. Peterson earned First Team All-American honors and was named MWC Co-Player of the Year with teammate Mitch Garver. He played 8 games of collegiate summer baseball in 2012 with the Hyannis Harbor Hawks of the Cape Cod Baseball League, again teaming up with Garver. In 2013, Peterson repeated as a first-team All-American and, with Garver, co-conference player of the year. He hit .408 with 18 home runs, failing to reach base in only one game all season.

=== Seattle Mariners ===
The Seattle Mariners selected Peterson in the first round, with the 12th overall selection, of the 2013 MLB draft. He signed with the Mariners for a $2.76 million signing bonus and spent 2013 with both the Everett AquaSox and Clinton LumberKings, posting a combined .303 batting average with 13 home runs and 47 RBIs in 55 total games between the two teams. He was hit by a pitch from Jorge López on August 22 that shattered his jaw and required emergency surgery in Iowa City and three subsequent surgeries in Seattle, ending his season.

In 2014, he played for the High Desert Mavericks and Jackson Generals, where he slashed .297/.360/.552 with 31 home runs, 111 RBIs, and a .912 OPS in 123 total games. In 2015, he returned to Jackson, where he batted .223 with seven home runs and 44 RBIs in 93 games. He also played in four games for the Triple-A Tacoma Rainiers at the end of the season. Peterson spent 2016 with both Jackson and Tacoma where he had a .264 batting average with 19 home runs and 78 RBIs in 119 games between the two clubs. The Mariners added him to their 40-man roster after the 2016 season.

Peterson began 2017 with Tacoma. After 103 games with the Rainiers, the Mariners designated him for assignment on July 30 to open a roster spot for Leonys Martín.

=== Chicago White Sox ===
The Chicago White Sox claimed Peterson off of waivers on August 6, 2017. He played for the Triple-A Charlotte Knights, batting just .198 in 25 games. In 128 games in Triple-A with Tacoma and Charlotte, he slashed .252/.315/.404 with 16 home runs and 63 RBI.

=== Cincinnati Reds ===
On September 17, 2017, Peterson was claimed off waivers by the Cincinnati Reds. He was removed from the team's 40-man roster two days later. He played in 2018 for the Louisville Bats, batting .277 with 16 home runs. The Reds granted his request for a release on December 18.

=== Chicago White Sox (second stint) ===
On January 12, 2019, Peterson signed a minor league contract with the White Sox. After 38 games and another sub-.200 batting average with the Knights, he was released by the organization on June 8.

=== Sugar Land Skeeters ===
On July 29, 2019, Peterson signed with the Sugar Land Skeeters of the independent Atlantic League. He became a free agent following the season.

On February 5, 2020, Peterson signed with the Tigres de Quintana Roo of the Mexican League. However, the Mexican League season was canceled in late June due to the COVID-19 pandemic. He later returned to play 26 games with the Sugar Land Skeeters in 2020 in the Constellation Energy League, a makeshift four-team independent league created during the pandemic. During 2020, he also worked at U-Haul.

=== Lexington Legends ===
On May 4, 2021, Peterson returned to the Atlantic League, signing with the Lexington Legends. In 45 games, Peterson slashed .311/.418/.683 with 15 home runs and 44 RBI.

=== Cleburne Railroaders ===
On August 3, 2021, Peterson was traded to the Cleburne Railroaders of the American Association of Professional Baseball for cash considerations. In 31 games, Peterson slashed .372/.450/.823 with 14 home runs and 37 RBI. He was released on November 11.

=== Colorado Rockies ===
On November 24, 2021, Peterson signed a minor league contract with the Colorado Rockies. He spent the 2022 season with the Triple-A Albuquerque Isotopes. In 89 games for Albuquerque, Peterson batted .249/.342/.502 with 20 home runs and 66 RBI. He elected free agency on November 10 and did not sign with another team.

On May 29, 2023, Peterson announced his retirement from professional baseball and that he would become an agent at Milk & Honey Sports, which had represented him as a player.

== Personal life ==
Peterson's younger brother, Dustin, was selected in the second round of the 2013 MLB Draft and most recently played in the Pittsburgh Pirates organization. Their sister, MacKenzie, played college softball for the New Mexico Lobos and Tartleton State Texans. Their parents are Doug and Missy Peterson.

Peterson married Breanna Macha-Peterson, a former Arizona State Sun Devils softball pitcher, in November 2019. She was the pitching coach the New Mexico Lobos softball team from 2018 to 2020, then became a coach at her alma mater, Red Mountain High School, in 2021.

As a child, Peterson's favorite ballplayer was Manny Ramirez.
