= Stan Stolte =

American baseball coach (born 1961)

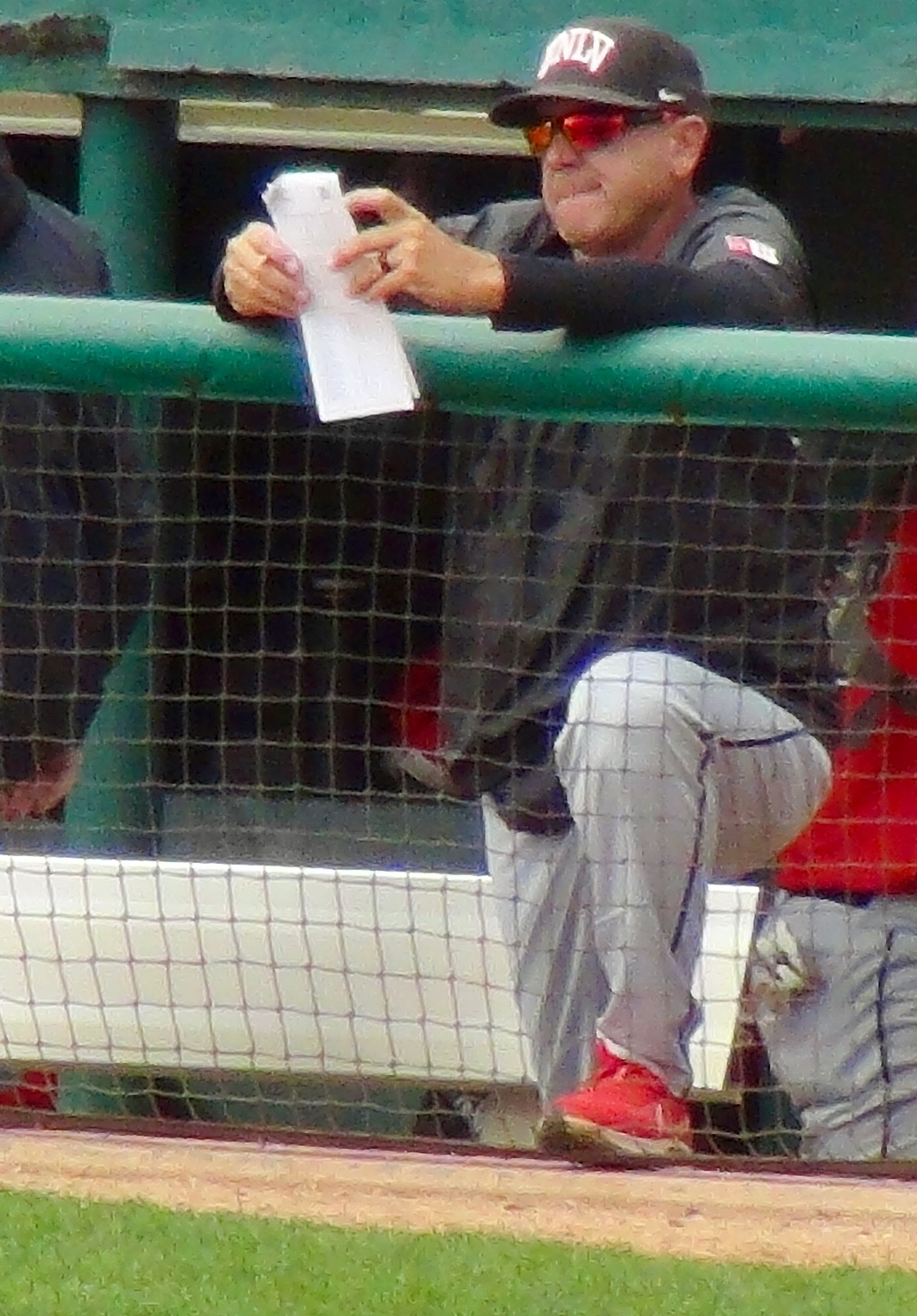
- Stolte in 2022

Biographical details
- Born: 1961 (age 64–65); Lowden, Iowa, U.S.

Playing career
- 1981–1982: Muscatine CC
- 1983–1984: St. Ambrose
- Positions: Infielder, pitcher

Coaching career (HC unless noted)
- 1985–1986: Clarence-Lowden HS
- 1987–1988: Northwest Missouri State (asst.)
- 1989–1990: Muscatine CC (asst.)
- 1991–1996: Pacific (asst.)
- 1997–2010: Nevada (asst.)
- 2011–2015: UNLV (asst.)
- 2016–2026: UNLV

Head coaching record
- Overall: 273–262 (.510)

Accomplishments and honors

Championships
- MW regular season (2022)

Awards
- MW Coach of the Year (2022)

Stan Durwood Stolte (born 1961) is an American college baseball coach, formerly the head baseball coach at the University of Nevada, Las Vegas. Stolte attended college at Muscatine Community College and St. Ambrose University, where he played college baseball. Stolte served as an assistant baseball coach at the University of Nevada, Las Vegas, the University of Nevada, Reno, the University of the Pacific, Muscatine Community College, and Northwest Missouri State University. Stolte served as interim head coach at the University of Nevada, Las Vegas for the 2016 season, before being named permanent head baseball coach at UNLV on June 1, 2016.

== Head coaching record ==
Record table
Season	Team	Overall	Conference	Standing	Postseason
UNLV Rebels (Mountain West Conference) (2016–2026)
2016	UNLV	24–32	14–16	4th	
2017	UNLV	20–36	10–20	7th	
2018	UNLV	30–17	11–11	4th	
2019	UNLV	29–29	14–16	T–3rd	
2020	UNLV	6–11	0–0		Season canceled due to COVID-19
2021	UNLV	20–13	15–12	3rd	
2022	UNLV	36–20	21–9	1st	
2023	UNLV	21–30	12–18	6th	
2024	UNLV	26–26	12–18	6th	
2025	UNLV	31–23	16–14	4th	
2026	UNLV	30–25	11–13	T–6th	
UNLV:		273–262 (.510)	136–147 (.481)		
Total:		273–262 (.510)			
