= Mike Kazlausky =

American baseball player and coach

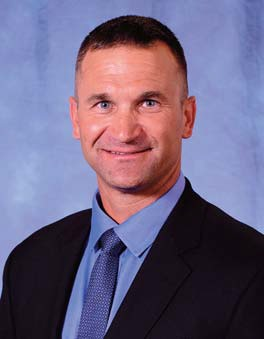

Biographical details
- Born: June 27, 1969 (age 57); Fox Lake, Illinois, U.S.

Playing career
- 1988–1991: Air Force
- Positions: Shortstop, second baseman

Coaching career (HC unless noted)
- 1993–1995: Air Force (assistant)
- 2000–2003: Air Force (assistant)
- 2006–2008: Air Force (assistant)
- 2011–present: Air Force

Head coaching record
- Overall: 364–466 (.439)
- Tournaments: NCAA: 2–2

Accomplishments and honors

Championships
- Mountain West tournament (2022); Mountain West regular season (2024)

Awards
- MW Coach of the Year (2024)

Michael Raymond Kazlausky (born June 27, 1969) is an American college baseball coach, formerly the head coach of the Air Force Falcons baseball team. He was named to that position on an interim basis prior to the 2011 season, and was made permanent after the season.

== Early life and education ==
After graduating from Grant Community High School in Fox Lake, Illinois, Kazlausky attended the United States Air Force Academy. On the Air Force Falcons baseball team, Kazlausky was a four-year infield starter at shortstop in 1988 and second baseman from 1989 to 1991 under head coach Paul Mainieri. He was an All-Western Athletic Conference honoree in his junior and senior seasons (1990 and 1991), led the team in batting in 1989 and 1991, and ranks among the top Falcons in many offensive categories. He graduated with eight career records.

== Coaching and military career ==
After serving two years in the United States Air Force, Kazlausky returned to the Academy and served as an assistant coach from 1993 to 1995. Kazlausky then returned to active service at Charleston Air Force Base as a Boeing C-17 Globemaster III pilot. He returned again to the Academy as an instructor in 2000, and served until 2004 as a volunteer assistant baseball coach. After two and a half years deployed abroad, Kazlausky returned again to the Academy and served his third tour as an assistant coach from 2006 to 2008.

He returned again in 2011 to serve as interim head coach, and retired after 20 years of service to become full-time head coach of the Falcons in 2012.

On July 15, 2026, Kazlausky announced he was stepping down from his head coaching position with Air Force, but will remain with the Academy as the Director of Leadership and Institutional Strategy for the athletics department.

== Head coaching record ==
Record table
Season	Team	Overall	Conference	Standing	Postseason
Air Force Falcons (Mountain West Conference) (2011–2026)
2011	Air Force	19–36	4–20	7th	
2012	Air Force	14–39	5–19	5th	
2013	Air Force	15–37	7–23	6th	
2014	Air Force	20–34	10–20	T–6th	
2015	Air Force	23–29	11–17	5th	
2016	Air Force	30–27	12–18	5th	
2017	Air Force	27–26	12–17	5th	
2018	Air Force	24–30	12–17	6th	
2019	Air Force	26–26	12–14	5th	
2020	Air Force	7–12	0–0		Season canceled due to COVID-19
2021	Air Force	26–22	18–16	4th	
2022	Air Force	32–29	15–15	T–4th	NCAA Regional
2023	Air Force	28–31	17–13	3rd	
2024	Air Force	27–28	18–12	1st	
2025	Air Force	20–34	12–18	7th	
2026	Air Force	26–26	15–9	T–2nd	
Air Force:		364–466 (.439)	180–248 (.421)		
Total:		364–466 (.439)			
National champion Postseason invitational champion Conference regular season champion Conference regular season and conference tournament champion Division regular season champion Division regular season and conference tournament champion Conference tournament champion

== See also ==
- List of current NCAA Division I baseball coaches
