= America First Ballpark =

College baseball stadium in Salt Lake City, Utah

- Location within Utah Location within the United States
- Interactive map of America First Ballpark
- Full name: Charlie Monfort Field at America First Ballpark
- Address: 725 Guardsman Way; Salt Lake City, Utah 84108
- Coordinates: 40°45′11.2″N 111°50′39.7″W
- Owner: University of Utah
- Operator: University of Utah
- Capacity: 1,200 (fixed seating); 3,000 (including berm seating)
- Type: Stadium
- Event: Baseball
- Surface: FieldTurf
- Field size: Left field: 340ft Center field: 400ft Right field: 340ft

Construction
- Groundbreaking: August 28, 2024
- Built: 2024–2026
- Opened: January 28, 2026
- Cost: $39 Million dollars
- Architects: Populous (design); VCBO Architecture (record)
- General contractor: Layton Construction

Tenant
- Utah Utes (NCAA) 2026–present

Charlie Monfort Field at America First Ballpark is a college baseball park in the western United States, located on the campus of the University of Utah in Salt Lake City, Utah. Opened in January 2026, it serves as the home field of the Utah Utes baseball team.

== History ==
Prior to 1996, the Utah Utes played at an on-campus ballpark known as Ute Field, nestled between the University's hospital and Fort Douglas. Ute Field was considered less than optimal in its condition and location next to the university's grass clippings dump. Former Utah player Dan Poulton described the field condition as reminding him of "cow pastures."

In 1993 a deal was reached to relocate the Portland Beavers to Salt Lake City (and bring PCL baseball back to the town for the first time since 1984) in exchange for the construction of a new ballpark on the site of Derks Field. The new ballpark was completed in 1994, and was named Franklin Quest Field (now known as Smith's Ballpark). Beginning that same year, the Utes played occasional games against rival BYU at Franklin Quest Field, before ultimately leaving Ute Field to move full-time to the new stadium in 1996.

While the new stadium presented a substantial upgrade from Ute Field, the field's location off-campus combined with the team's shared tenancy with the Salt Lake City Bees posed some difficulties. As the stadium's primary tenant, the Bees held priority in game scheduling. As a result, the Utes were forced to schedule games at unusual times or – in some cases – to even move games to other locations, including moving 9 games in the 2021 season to Lindquist Field in Ogden. As early as 2016, the Utes had begun exploring the possibility of building a permanent stadium on-campus at their Guardsman Way practice facility, though these plans never progressed.

In 2023, the Bees announced they would be constructing a new stadium in South Jordan – a southern suburb of Salt Lake City – to replace the 30 year old Smith's Ballpark. With the Bees' departure impending, Salt Lake City announced plans to redevelop the Smith's Ballpark site, forcing the Utes to search for a new home.

== Planning and construction ==
=== Planning and design ===
In April of that year, the university's board of trustees granted "contingency approval" for a new $35 million on-campus baseball stadium to be built on the site of the team's practice field located on Guardsman Way beside Sunnyside Park. Initial plans called for the stadium to be ready in time for the Utes' debut season in the Big 12 Conference in 2025. Fundraising efforts began immediately and were completed primarily through private sources, including a $10 million donation from Utah-alumnus and Colorado Rockies co-owner Charlie Monfort. International sports stadium architecture firm Populous was chosen as the design architect, local firm VCBO Architecture was tabbed as the project's architect of record and Layton Construction was selected as the general contractor.

The proposed stadium's location on the edge of campus adjacent to a city park and Salt Lake City's Yalecrest neighborhood immediately posed a number of issues. The Yalecrest Neighborhood Association strongly opposed construction of the new ballpark claiming that the plans violated a promise the university made to the Association in 2018 that the practice field would never be converted to a stadium, amongst other complaints. The existing footprint of the practice field was not large enough to accommodate construction of a stadium and a full-size NCAA regulation field. To prevent the need to construct a 35-foot tall outfield wall as required by NCAA rules for a shortened field, the university sought to acquire a strip of the park in order to build a full-size field.

Despite some objections from residents about the reduction in public park land and the negotiated price, the Salt Lake City Council unanimously voted in March 2024 to approve a 99-year lease of the strip of park land to the university at a rate of $1 per year. In return for the lease the university was required to pay the city $4.2 million for upgrades to Sunnyside Park. Further concessions included constructing the stadium's restroom facilities to be openable to the public park while the stadium is not in use, allowing the stadium to be rented by the public when not in use by the team and scheduling games to be played at "low-traffic times." The stadium was also designed without a video board to help avoid light and sound pollution into the neighborhood.

=== Construction ===
Construction of the new stadium began with a groundbreaking ceremony on August 28, 2024.

On May 16, 2025, a ceremony marked the topping-out of the new stadium structure with the placing of the final steel beam signed by many members of the university's athletics community.

Construction of the new artificial FieldTurf playing surface was completed in August 2025, in time to be used for the Utes' fall camp.

Exterior work on the stadium was largely completed by September 2025.

=== Naming Rights ===
On November 14, 2023, the university announced that the stadium's naming rights had been sold to Riverdale, Utah based America First Credit Union on a 10-year deal.

On August 13, 2024, the university's board of trustees voted to name the stadium's field after Utah-alumnus and Colorado Rockies co-founder Charlie Monfort in recognition of his $10 million contribution to the construction cost of the stadium. The stadium's full name became Charlie Monfort Field at America First Ballpark.

== Opening ==
The stadium officially opened on January 28, 2026, with an unveiling ceremony.

The ballpark's inaugural game is scheduled to be held on March 6, 2026, between the Utes and the Grand Canyon Antelopes.

== Facilities ==
Charlie Monfort Field at America First Ballpark contains team locker room facilities, strength and conditioning facilities such as a weight room and recovery room, a team lounge and indoor hitting and pitching cages. The stadium also contains a film room, meeting room, and coaches offices. This marked a consolidation of the team's operations in one place; previously the team had been split between their on-campus practice field, separate on-campus offices and strength and conditioning facilities, and Smith's Ballpark in downtown.

The playing field stretches 340 feet in both the left and right field corners and to 400 feet in center field. The playing surface consists of artificial FieldTurf, chosen specifically to eliminate the need for winter maintenance and allow the team to practice at the facility year-round. Previously, the team had been forced to practice during snowy winters at the football team's indoor practice facility or even to travel as far as St. George, Utah to practice in warmer weather.

The stadium contains 1,200 permanent seats with seatbacks, with a grass berm in the outfield that supports a maximum capacity of 3,000 spectators. Multiple concession stands are located throughout the ballpark as well as space near the berm seating for food truck parking.
