= Matt Carson (baseball) =

American baseball player (born 1981)

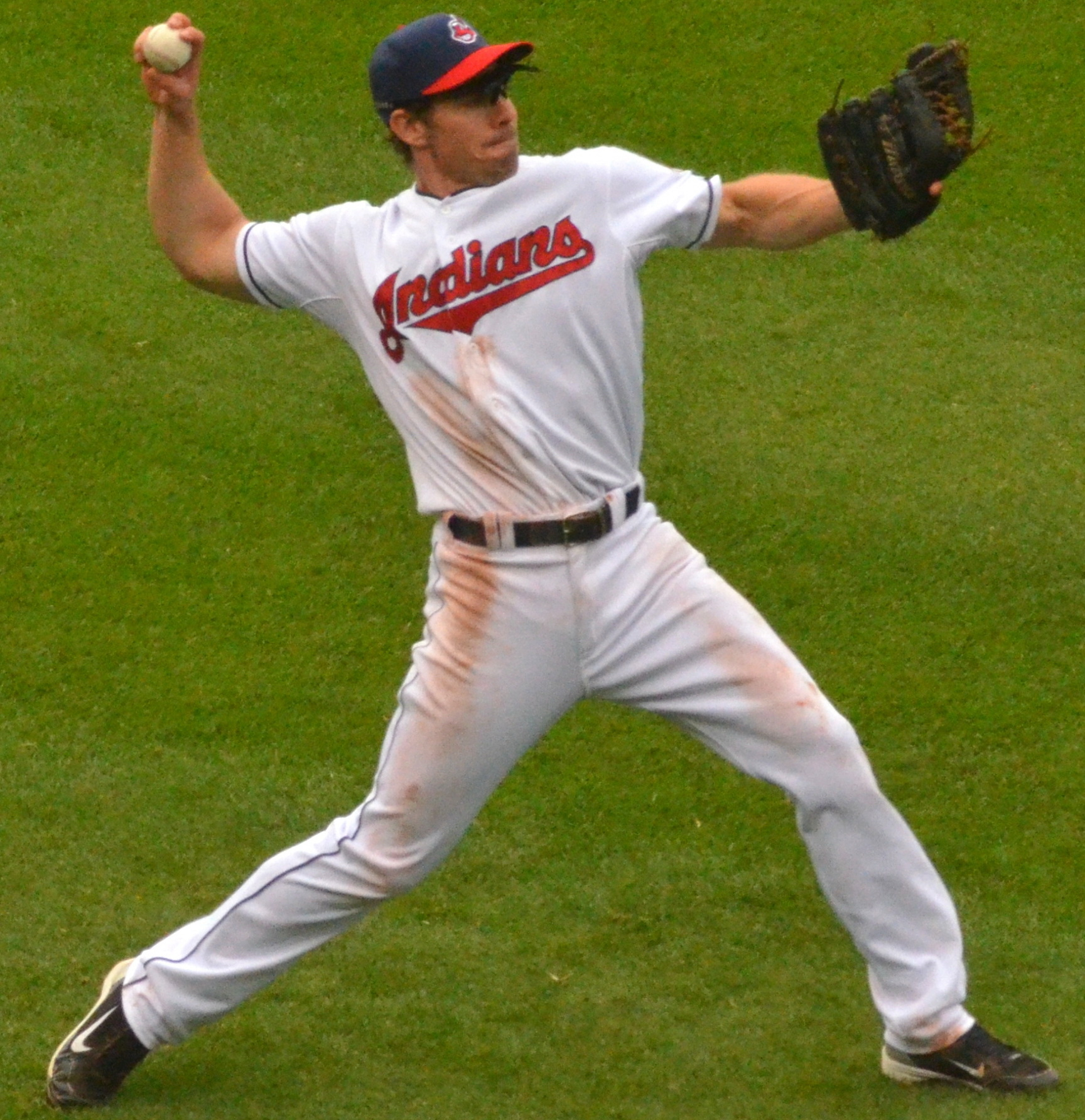
- Carson with the Cleveland Indians
- Outfielder
- Born: July 1, 1981 (age 45); Newport Beach, California, U.S.
- Batted: Right Threw: Right

MLB debut
- September 18, 2009, for the Oakland Athletics

Last MLB appearance
- September 29, 2013, for the Cleveland Indians

MLB statistics
- Batting average: .237
- Home runs: 6
- Runs batted in: 21
- Stats at Baseball Reference

Teams
- Oakland Athletics (2009–2010); Minnesota Twins (2012); Cleveland Indians (2013)

Matthew Reese Carson (born July 1, 1981) is an American former professional baseball outfielder. He is 6 feet 2 inches (1.88 m) tall and weighs 200 pounds (91 kg). He has played in Major League Baseball (MLB) for the Oakland Athletics, Minnesota Twins, and Cleveland Indians.

Prior to playing professionally, he attended Yucaipa High School and then Brigham Young University (BYU).

== Collegiate career ==
At BYU, he majored in mechanical engineering and was named to the Mountain West Conference All-Tournament Team in his freshman season, which was also the event's inaugural year. In 2000, he played collegiate summer baseball with the Hyannis Mets of the Cape Cod Baseball League, and returned to the league in 2001 to play for the Brewster Whitecaps.

== Professional career ==
=== New York Yankees ===
Carson was drafted by the New York Yankees in the fifth round of the 2002 Major League Baseball draft. He began his minor league career in with the Staten Island Yankees, hitting .203 in 48 games. He spent the next season with the Battle Creek Yankees, hitting .259 with 11 home runs and 100 strikeouts in 119 games. In 2004, he played for the Battle Creek Yankees and Tampa Yankees, hitting a combined .271 with 15 home runs and 111 strikeouts in 132.

Carson split the 2005 season between Tampa and the Trenton Thunder, batting .238 with nine home runs in 112 games. In 2006, he played for those two teams again, hitting .248 with ten home runs in 69 games. He spent all of 2007 with Trenton, hitting .248 with 16 home runs, and in 2008 he played for Trenton and the Scranton/Wilkes-Barre Yankees, hitting .285 with 15 home runs in 111 games.

=== Oakland Athletics ===
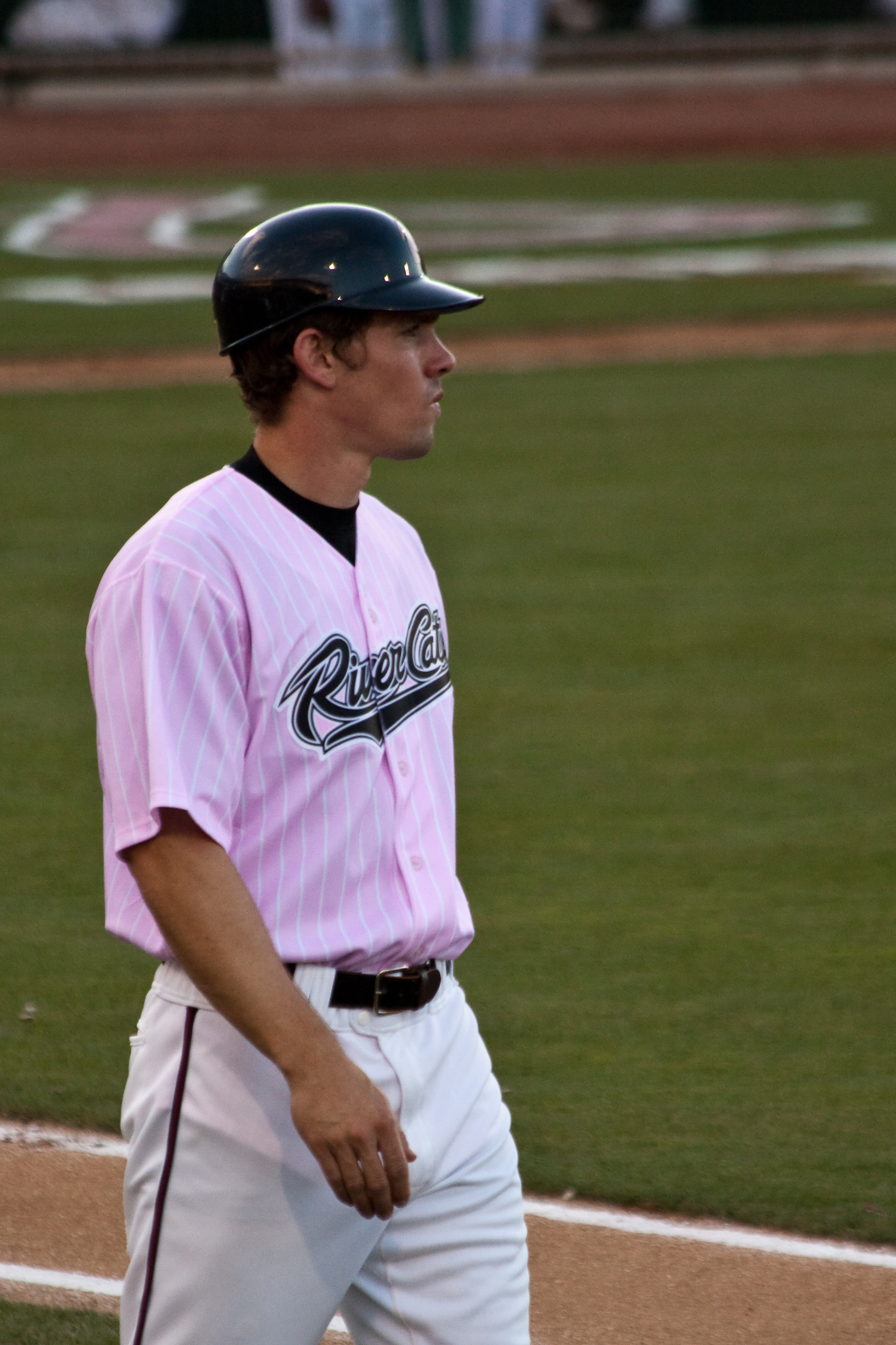
Carson with the Sacramento River Cats

Carson signed as a minor league free agent with the Oakland Athletics on December 1, 2008, and played with the Sacramento River Cats. He had a career year, hitting .264 with 25 home runs and 77 RBI, and was subsequently called up to the major leagues.

Carson made his major league debut on September 18, 2009, against the Cleveland Indians. In his first game, he struck out twice in three at-bats. His first hit was a single to right field off of Tomo Ohka of the Indians the following day.

Three days later, he hit his first major league home run in the 9th inning off of the Texas Rangers' Eddie Guardado. Carson was outrighted to the minors after the 2010 season. In 46 games over two seasons, he hit .200 with five homers and 14 RBI.

=== Tampa Bay Rays ===
He was purchased by the Tampa Bay Rays from the Athletics on August 1, 2011, and briefly played with the Durham Bulls, where he hit .250 in 22 games. After the 2011 season, he elected free agency.

=== Minnesota Twins ===
He signed a minor league contract with the Minnesota Twins on November 17, 2011. He spent most of the season in Triple-A with the Rochester Red Wings, hitting .282 with 14 homers and 53 RBI. He also appeared in 26 games for the Twins, hitting .227.

=== Cleveland Indians ===
After signing with the Cleveland Indians on November 19, 2012, Carson went on to appear in 20 games for Cleveland, collecting seven hits, including one homer, in 11 at-bats. On September 19, he hit a walk-off single against the Houston Astros. After the season, Carson was non-tendered by the Indians, making him a free agent. He was re-signed to a minor league deal on December 13, 2013.

=== Los Angeles Dodgers ===
On January 9, 2015, he signed a minor league contract with the Los Angeles Dodgers, that included an invitation to major league spring training. He was subsequently assigned to the Triple-A Oklahoma City Dodgers.

=== Oakland Athletics (second stint) ===
On May 8, 2015, Carson was traded to the Oakland Athletics in exchange for cash considerations. He played in 33 games for the Triple-A Nashville Sounds, batting .209/.296/.336 with three home runs, 13 RBI, and three stolen bases. Carson was released by the Athletics organization on June 20.
