= Craig Heyer =

American professional baseball pitcher (born 1985)

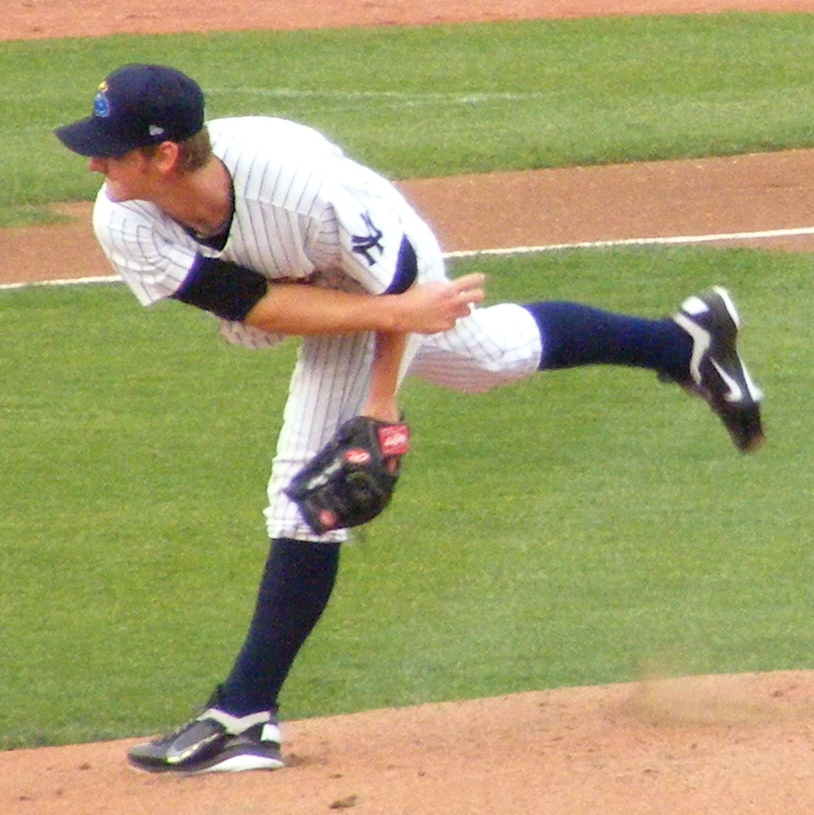
- Heyer with the Trenton Thunder in 2011
- Pitcher
- Born: November 15, 1985 (age 39); Scottsdale, Arizona, U.S.
- Bats: Right Throws: Right

Craig D. Heyer (born November 15, 1985) is an American professional baseball pitcher. Prior to becoming a professional, Heyer played college baseball at the College of Southern Nevada and University of Nevada, Las Vegas (UNLV).

== Career ==
Heyer attended Coronado High School, where he starred for the school's baseball team. He was named co-pitcher of the year in the East Sky Region in 2004, his senior season. The Arizona Diamondbacks drafted Heyer in the 36th round of the 2004 Major League Baseball (MLB) Draft. He enrolled at the College of Southern Nevada (CSN) in 2005, a junior college competing athletically in the National Junior College Athletic Association (NJCAA). Heyer was a "draft-and-follow" prospect, intending to sign with the Diamondbacks before the 2005 draft. He did not sign with the Diamondbacks, returning to CSN.

The Diamondbacks again chose Heyer, this time in the 31st round of the 2005 MLB draft. He again did not sign with the Diamondbacks, remaining at CSN for his sophomore season. The NJCAA forced CSN to forfeit its first 37 games of his sophomore year when Heyer and a teammate were ruled ineligible. Heyer was undrafted in 2006, and transferred to UNLV for his junior season, where he played for the UNLV Rebels baseball team. After the 2006 season, he played collegiate summer baseball for the Thunder Bay Border Cats of the Northwoods League. He returned to UNLV in 2007 for his senior season. The Yankees drafted Heyer in the 22nd round of the 2007 MLB draft, and he signed.

Heyer pitched for the Staten Island Yankees of the Class-A Short Season New York–Pennsylvania League in 2007, the Charleston RiverDogs of the Class-A South Atlantic League in 2008, the Tampa Yankees of the Class-A Advanced Florida State League in 2009 and 2010. The Yankees assigned him to the Phoenix Desert Dogs of the Arizona Fall League in 2010. He pitched for the Trenton Thunder of the Class-AA Eastern League in 2011. Slated to begin the 2012 season in Trenton, he was instead promoted to the Class-AAA Scranton/Wilkes-Barre Yankees of the International League. Heyer pitched for the New Jersey Jackals of the independent Canadian American Association of Professional Baseball in 2013.
