= Erdle Field =

Baseball venue at the United States Air Force Academy

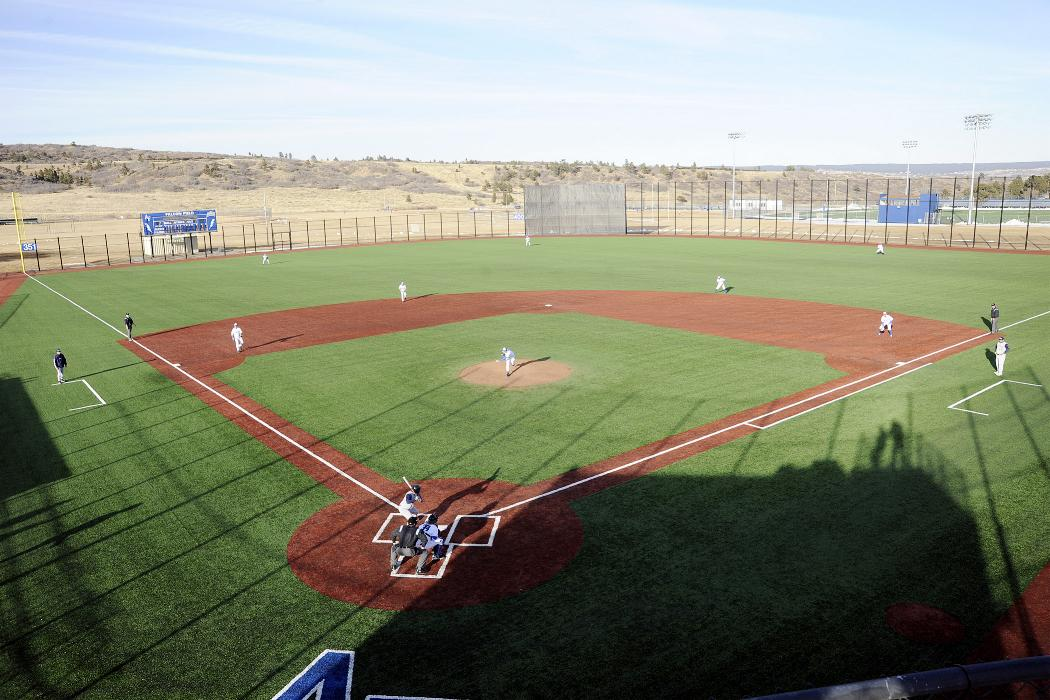
- Interactive map of Erdle Field
- Former names: Falcon Baseball Field
- Location: 2168 Field House Drive, USAF Academy, CO, USA
- Coordinates: 39.015593°N 104.888245°W
- Owner: Air Force Academy
- Operator: Air Force Academy
- Capacity: 1,000
- Surface: FieldTurf
- Scoreboard: Electronic
- Field size: 349 ft. (LF), 393 ft. (LCF), 400 ft. (CF), 365 ft. (RCF), 316 ft. (RF)

Construction
- Opened: 1957
- Renovated: 1991
- Expanded: 1991

Tenant
- Air Force Falcons baseball (MWC) (1957–present)

Erdle Field is a baseball venue located on the grounds of the United States Air Force Academy in El Paso County, Colorado, USA, north of Colorado Springs. It is home to the Air Force Falcons college baseball team, which represents the Academy in the NCAA Division I Mountain West Conference. Opened in 1957, the venue has a capacity of 1,000 spectators. The field, located in the Rampart Range of the Rocky Mountains, is more than 7,000 feet (2,100 m) above sea level.

In both 1976 and 1995, the field hosted the United States Olympic Festivals.

== Renaming ==
In September 2023, Falcon Field was renamed to Erdle Field in honor of Brigadier General Philip J. Erdle.

== Renovations ==
In 1991, the facility underwent major renovations. The most notable was the addition of an AstroTurf infield and new drainage systems; these allowed for better field conditions following inclement weather. Also, field dimensions were altered, and the dugouts were improved. The field features a 24-foot-high fence in right field. Seating capacity was expanded as well.

In 2010, the AstroTurf infield was replaced with Sport Turf, which has since been replaced with FieldTurf.

In Summer of 2023, major renovation plans were announced for the field. There was no start or completion date given.

== See also ==
- List of NCAA Division I baseball venues
