= Santa Ana Star Field =

Baseball park in Albuquerque, New Mexico

Coordinates: 35°3′55″N 106°37′57″W

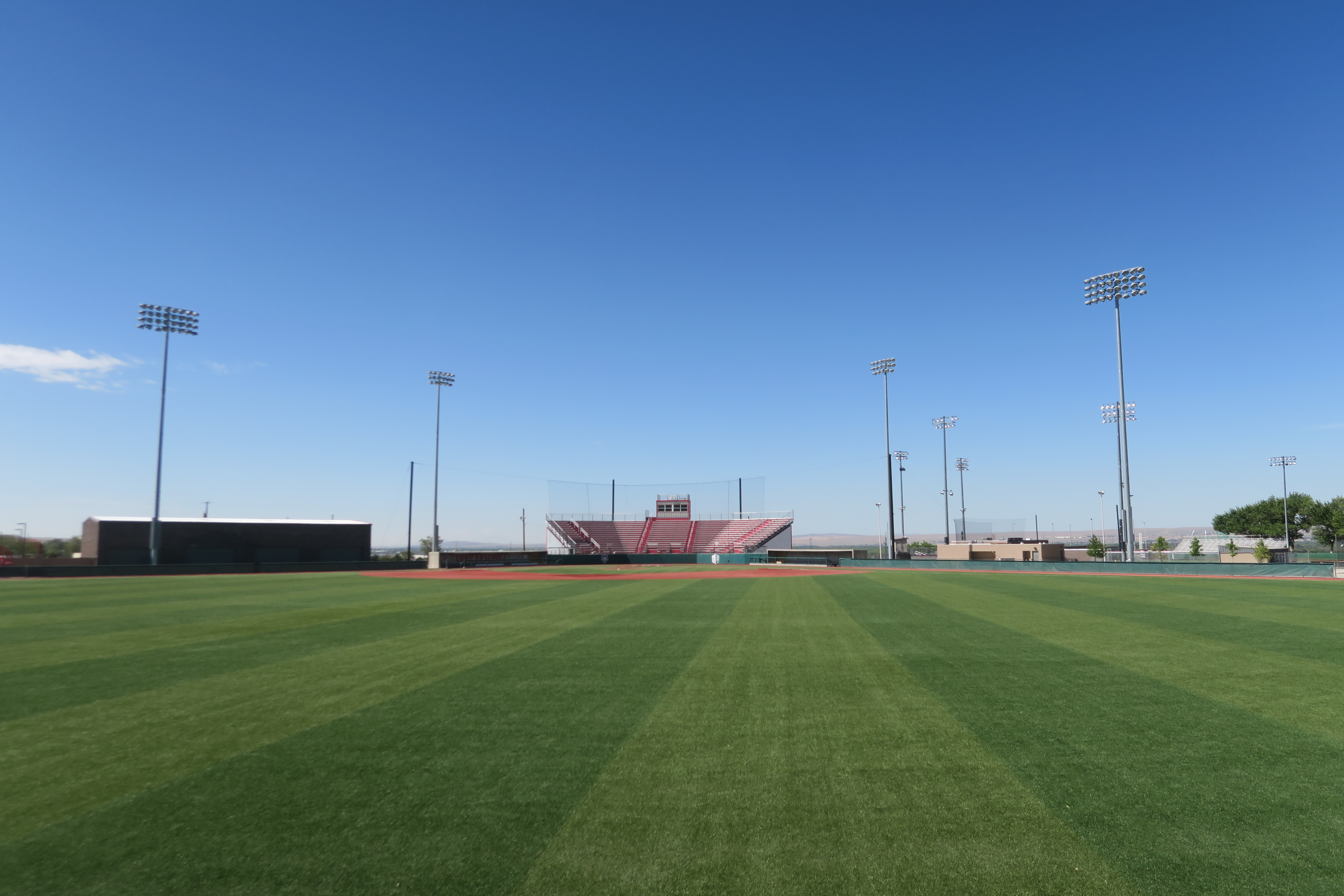
- Interactive map of Santa Ana Star Field
- Former names: Lobo Field (–2015)
- Location: Albuquerque, New Mexico
- Owner: University of New Mexico
- Operator: University of New Mexico
- Capacity: 1,000
- Surface: Grass
- Field size: Left Field- 344 feet Left Center Field- 413 feet Center Field- 408 feet Right Center Field- 406 feet Right Field- 336 feet

Tenant
- New Mexico Lobos (NCAA) (19??–2003, 2013–present)

Santa Ana Star Field, formerly known as Lobo Field, is a baseball stadium located in Albuquerque, New Mexico that serves as the home of the University of New Mexico Lobos baseball team. Lobo Field had served as New Mexico's practice field as the Lobos played home games at Isotopes Park, home of the Triple-A Albuquerque Isotopes baseball team. On March 7, 2011, the University of New Mexico regents approved a $3 million renovation plan for Lobo Field.

On March 27, 2013, New Mexico announced it was moving all its remaining home baseball games from Isotopes Park to the still-under-renovation Lobo Field, due to restrictions placed on the Lobos for the use of Isotopes Park.

On December 11, 2015, the school announced that Tamaya Enterprises, which owns the Santa Ana Star Casino, agreed to a 10-year, $1 million naming rights deal for the stadium.

== See also ==
- List of NCAA Division I baseball venues
