= Air Force Falcons baseball =

College baseball team representing the United States Air Force Academy

- 2026 Air Force Falcons baseball team
- Founded: 1957; 69 years ago
- University: United States Air Force Academy
- Head coach: Drew LaComb (1st season)
- Conference: Mountain West
- Location: USAF Academy, Colorado
- Home stadium: Erdle Field (capacity: 1,000)
- Nickname: Falcons
- Colors: Blue and silver

NCAA tournament appearances
- 1961, 1962, 1964, 1966, 1967, 1969, 2022

Conference tournament champions
- 2022

Conference regular season champions
- 2024

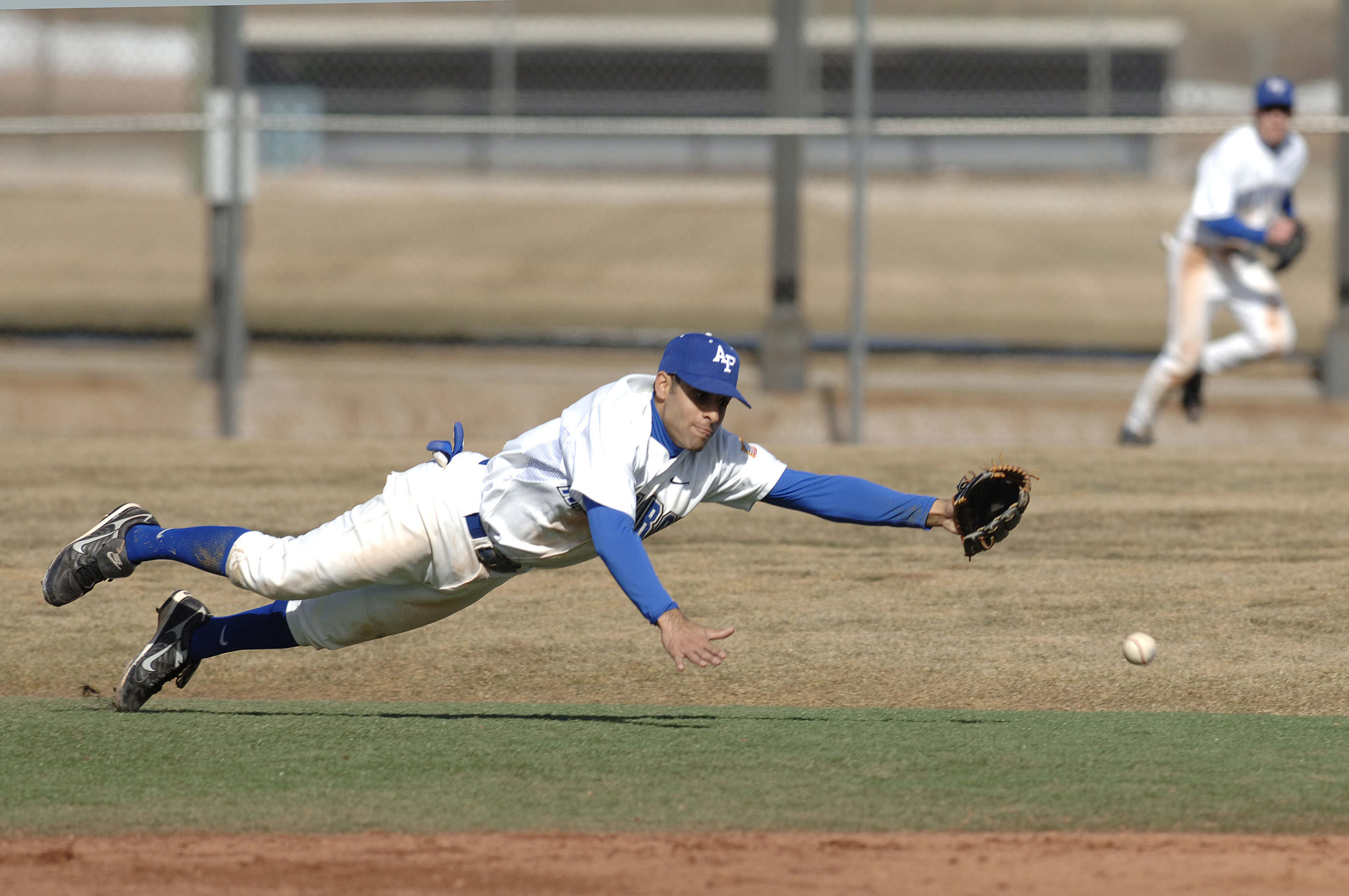
KJ Randhawa dives for a hard-hit ground ball

For information on all United States Air Force Academy sports, see Air Force Falcons

The Air Force Falcons baseball team is a varsity intercollegiate athletic team of the United States Air Force Academy in El Paso County, Colorado, United States, north of Colorado Springs. The team is a member of the Mountain West Conference, which is part of the National Collegiate Athletic Association's Division I. Air Force's first baseball team was fielded in 1957. The team plays its home games at Erdle Field on the Academy grounds. The Falcons are coached by Drew LaComb.

== Major League Baseball ==
Air Force has had thirteen Major League Baseball draft selections since the draft began in 1965.

Another former Air Force player, Paul Skenes, was the first overall pick in 2023. He played two seasons at the Academy before transferring to LSU after the 2022 season.

Air Force Falcons in the Major League Baseball Draft
Year	Player	Round	Team
1972	Brad Fulk	1 (2nd overall)	Rangers
1974	Jeffrey Brown	20	Phillies
2001	Mike Thiessen	42	Diamondbacks
2007	Karl Bolt	15	Phillies
2013	Garrett Custons	10	Blue Jays
2015	Ben Yokley	29	Cardinals
2016	Griffin Jax	3	Twins
2016	Jacob DeVries	38	Guardians
2017	Adam Groesbeck	38	Braves
2019	Nic Ready	23	Marlins
2023	Sam Kulasingam	17	Blue Jays
2024	Sam Kulasingam	13	Royals
2024	Jay Thomason	17	Twins

== Mountain West Tournament history ==
The Falcons have appeared in 14 Mountain West baseball tournaments since it began in 2000.

Air Force Mountain West Baseball Tournament History
Year	Seed	Record	Pct.	Placing
2000	6th	2-2	.500	2nd
2001	6th	0-2	.000	6th
2002	4th	0-2	.000	5th
2003	6th	0-2	.000	6th
2004	6th	1-2	.333	5th
2005	6th	0-2	.000	6th
2006	7th	0-2	.000	7th
2013	6th	0-2	.000	6th
2014	6th	0-2	.000	7th
2015	5th	1-2	.333	5th
2016	5th	2-2	.500	3rd
2022	4th	3–0	1.000	1st
2023	3rd	2–2	.500	2nd
2024	1st	1–1	.500	3rd

== NCAA tournament history ==
Air Force has been to the NCAA Division I baseball tournament 7 times in its history.

Air Force NCAA tournament History
Year	Record	Pct.	Notes
1961	0-2	.000	Lost to Wyoming in the NCAA District 7 Regional Upper final. Eliminated by Colorado State College in the Lower final.
1962	2-2	.500	Eliminated by Colorado State College in the NCAA District 7 Regional final.
1964	2-2	.500	Eliminated by Arizona State in the NCAA District 7 Regional finals.
1966	1-2	.333	Eliminated by Idaho in the NCAA District 7 Regional finals.
1967	2-3	.400	Eliminated by Arizona State in the NCAA District 7 tournament finals.
1969	0-2	.000	Eliminated by Idaho in the NCAA District 7 tournament semifinals.
2022	2-2	.500	Eliminated by Texas in the NCAA Austin Regional final.

== Head coaches ==
In 65 years of play in college baseball, the Falcons have had fifteen head coaches.

Air Force Falcons Head Coaches
Tenure	Coach	Record	Pct.
1957	Glenn Mackie	6–9	.400
1958	Jack Schwall	9–9	.500
1959–1963	Wendell Lawrence	69–52	.570
1964–1967	John Sparks	65–36	.643
1968	Rene Miller	14–17	.452
1969–1970	Terry Goewert	37–20–1	.647
1971–1975 & 1977–1985	Joe Robison	282–255–2	.525
1976	Ron Hudak	17–24	.417
1986–1988	Jim Hanley	56–89	.386
1989–1994	Paul Mainieri	152–158	.485
1995–1998	Eric Campbell	74–137	.351
1999	Joe Giarratano	19–32	.373
2000–2003	Reed Peters	88–134	.396
2004–2010	Mike Hutcheon	78–287	.213
2011–2026	Mike Kazlausky	364–466	.439
2027–present	Drew LaComb	0–0	.000

== See also ==
- List of NCAA Division I baseball programs
