= Earl Wilson Stadium =

Baseball stadium in Paradise, Nevada, US

Earl E. Wilson Stadium at Roger Barnson Field
- Earl Wilson Stadium

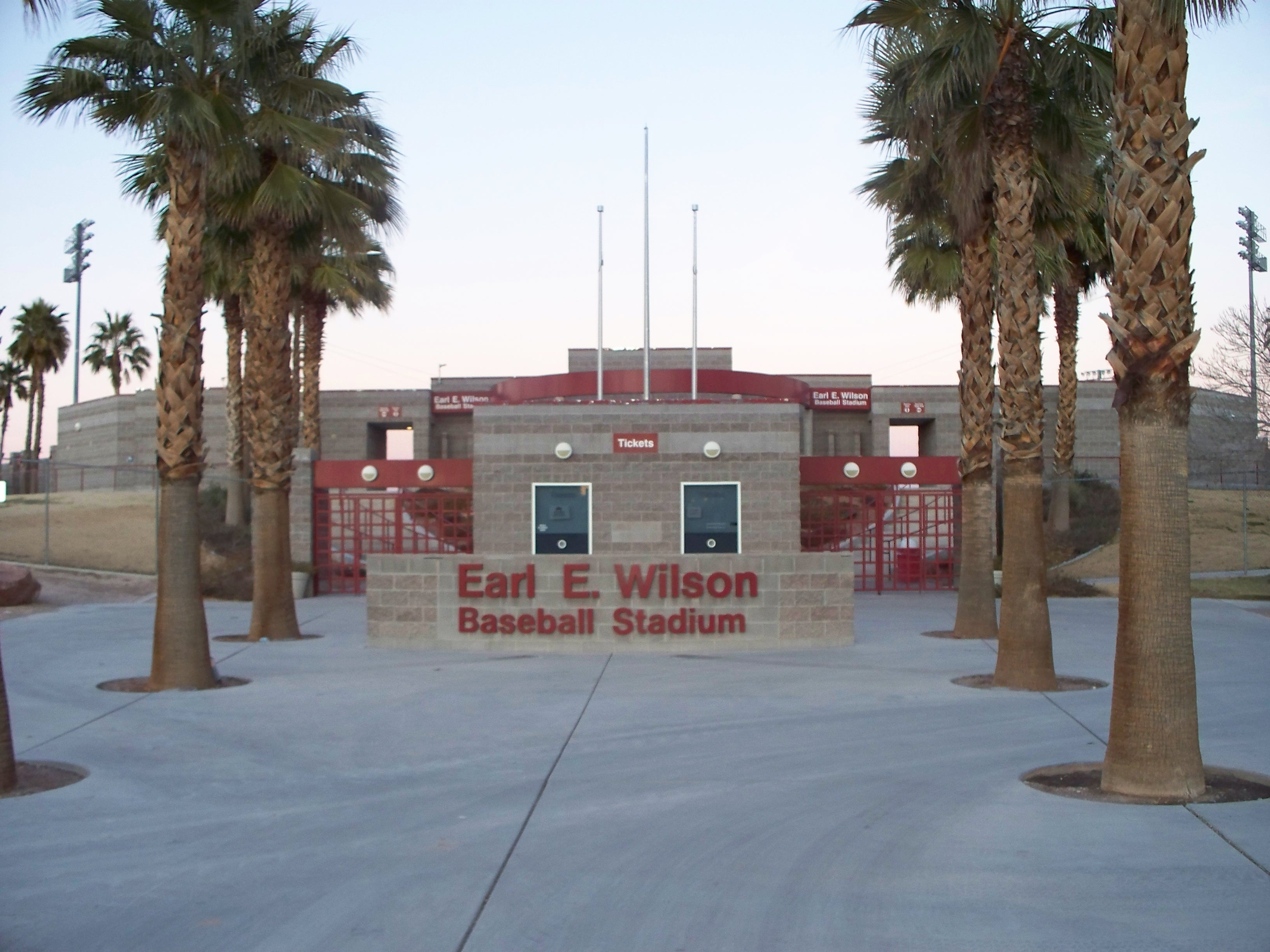
- Entrance of Earl Wilson Stadium

- Location in Nevada Location in the United States Location in North America
- Interactive map of Earl E. Wilson Stadium at Roger Barnson Field
- Location: Paradise, Nevada, U.S.
- Coordinates: 36°6′41″N 115°8′51″W
- Owner: University of Nevada, Las Vegas
- Operator: University of Nevada, Las Vegas
- Capacity: 3,000
- Surface: Grass (Santa Ana)
- Field size: Left Field – 335ft Left-Center Field – 375ft Center Field – 400ft Right-Center Field – 375ft Right Field – 335ft

Construction
- Groundbreaking: May 27, 1993; 33 years ago
- Opened: August 1994; 32 years ago
- Cost: $1.2 million

Tenant
- UNLV Rebels (NCAA) (1994–present)

Earl E. Wilson Baseball Stadium at Roger Barnson Field is a baseball stadium located on the northwest corner of the University of Nevada, Las Vegas, campus in Paradise, Nevada.

== History ==
It has been the home field for the UNLV Hustlin' Rebels college baseball team since its opening in 1994. The stadium features 2,500 theater-type seats and 500 bleacher back seats bringing the stadium's capacity to 3,000. The stadium was dedicated on January 29, 1994 in conjunction with a UNLV Alumni game. 2,500 attended the game and grand opening ceremonies. In 1997, the infield playing surface was replaced and the outfield fence was replaced with a new fence that stands 12' high. In 2007 the stadium received a new playing surface and in 2009 it received a new scoreboard in left field to replace the original one. Earl Wilson Stadium has hosted five Mountain West Conference baseball tournaments (2000, 2004, 2006, 2007, 2012), more than any other venue. In 2010, the locker rooms were remodeled, the clubhouse lounge area received new flatscreen TVs and couches, the infield grass was replaced, new black padding was installed behind the backstop, a fresh halo was installed around the batting circle and the facility received a fresh coat of red paint. Future plans call for a new clubhouse, a new synthetic outfield surface, an overhang for the bleachers, a two-story press box, new batting cages and a video scoreboard to replace the scoreboard which was installed in 2009.

Earl Wilson Stadium sits on the former site of UNLV's original baseball stadium, Rebel Field. Rebel Field opened on April 1, 1973, when the Hustlin' Rebels lost to Southern Cal 9–2 in front of 1,500 fans. The attendance record at the stadium happened in May 1977 when 5,000 watched the Kenny Rogers Celebrity-News Media Softball Game benefiting the Nevada Special Olympics. In 1980, Hustlin' Rebel Field was renamed Roger Barnson Field in honor of the late UNLV assistant athletic director, Roger Barnson. Barnson, a former pitcher at Arizona State University, had lost his life in an automobile accident on March 14, 1980.

Earl Wilson Stadium was built with $1.2 million from a $6.5 million gift from the estate of Earl and Hazel Wilson. The $6.5 million gift was the largest single gift ever received by the university, was donated by the late Hazel Wilson on behalf of her late husband, Earl. Earl Wilson was a Las Vegas businessman who was a major stockholder in the Golden Nugget Hotel & Casino in downtown Las Vegas and had played semi-professional baseball in Oregon.

== See also ==
- List of NCAA Division I baseball venues
- Sports in the Las Vegas metropolitan area
- UNLV Rebels
