= Utah Utes baseball =

Varsity baseball program of University of Utah

Utah Utes
- 2026 Utah Utes baseball team
- Founded: 1892 (133 years ago)
- University: University of Utah
- Head coach: Gary Henderson (5th season)
- Conference: Big 12
- Location: Salt Lake City, UT
- Home stadium: America First Ballpark (capacity: 3,000)
- Nickname: Utes
- Colors: Red and white

College World Series appearances
- 1951

NCAA tournament appearances
- 1951, 1959, 1960, 2009, 2016

Conference tournament champions
- 2009

Conference regular season champions
- 1964, 1965, 1997, 2016

The Utah Utes baseball team is the varsity intercollegiate baseball program of University of Utah in Salt Lake City, Utah, United States. The program's first season was in 1892, and it was a member of the NCAA Division I Pac-12 Conference from the start of the 2012 season until the conference's collapse after the 2024 season. The Utes joined the Big 12 Conference in 2025.

Through the 2025 season, the Utes' home venue was Smith's Ballpark, located in downtown Salt Lake City. With the ballpark's main tenant, the Triple-A Salt Lake Bees, opening the new Daybreak Field in nearby South Jordan in 2025, combined with the planned redevelopment of the Smith's Ballpark site, the university constructed the new on-campus America First Ballpark, which now hosts the Utes as of 2026.

Gary Henderson is the team's head coach, beginning with the 2022 season. The program has appeared in 5 NCAA tournaments. It has won 1 conference tournament championship and 4 regular season conference titles. As of the start of the 2021 Major League Baseball season, 17 former Utes have appeared in Major League Baseball.

== Year by year record ==
Season	Coach	Record		Notes
Season	Coach	Overall	Conference	Notes
Western Athletic Conference
1963	Pres Summerhayes	15–14	4–4	
1964	Pres Summerhayes	14–16	6–4	WAC Northern Division Champions
1965	Pres Summerhayes	21–16	7–5	WAC Northern Division Champions
1966	Pres Summerhayes	19–20	5–7	
1967	Pres Summerhayes	19–14	3–7	
1968	Pres Summerhayes	19–13	4–5	
1969	Pres Summerhayes	20–22	7–11	
1970	Pres Summerhayes	20–18	3–10	
1971	Pres Summerhayes	17–24	7–11	
1972	Pres Summerhayes	21–28	4–14	
1973	Pres Summerhayes	11–20	7–11	
1974	Tom Kilgore	18–25	11–7	
1975	Tom Kilgore	17–28	6–12	
1976	Tom Kilgore	15–26	8–9	
1977	Tom Kilgore	17–28	6–12	
1978	Tom Kilgore	8–27	6–12	
1979	Tom Kilgore	7–36	2–15	
1980	Mike Weathers	17–19	5–12	
1981	Mike Weathers	23–20	15–9	
1982	Lonnie Keeter	17–31	12–12	
1983	Lonnie Keeter	15–18	7–15	
1984	Lonnie Keeter	23–25	13–11	
1985	Lonnie Keeter	29–21	12–11	
1986	Lonnie Keeter	9–32	3–21	
1987	Lonnie Keeter	16–34	8–16	
1988	Rick Sofield	10–32	8–17	
1989	Rick Sofield	17–32	10–18	
1990	Rick Sofield	19–33	10–16	
1991	Rick Sofield	23–30	11–12	
1992	Rick Sofield	20–34	11–15	
1993	Rick Sofield	31–19	14–9	
1994	Rick Sofield	22–32	9–15	
1995	Steve Gillespie	15–39	7–21	
1996	Bill Kinneberg	30–22	15–15	
1997	Tim Esmay	36–21–1	22–8	WAC Northern Division Champions
1998	Tim Esmay	23–31	12–18	
		673-900-1		
Mountain West Conference
1999	Tim Esmay	22–30	8–20	
2000	Tim Esmay	26–30	15–15	
2001	Tim Esmay	27–29	14–16	
2002	Tim Esmay	33–26	16–14	
2003	Tim Esmay	24–32	10–20	
2004	Tim Esmay	22–36	11–19	
2005	Bill Kinneberg	19–36	10–20	
2006	Bill Kinneberg	28–28	9–13	
2007	Bill Kinneberg	24–31	12–12	
2008	Bill Kinneberg	26–31	10–14	
2009	Bill Kinneberg	28–31	8–16	MWC Tournament champions NCAA Regional
2010	Bill Kinneberg	23–28	10–13	
2011	Bill Kinneberg	29–21	16–7	
		331-389		
Pac-12 Conference
2012	Bill Kinneberg	14–42	7–23	
2013	Bill Kinneberg	21–31	7–23	
2014	Bill Kinneberg	16–36	4–26	
2015	Bill Kinneberg	16–36–1	7–22–1	
2016	Bill Kinneberg	25–27	19–11	Pac-12 Champions; NCAA Regional
2017	Bill Kinneberg	27–24	15–15	
2018	Bill Kinneberg	16–39	8–22	
2019	Bill Kinneberg	16–33	6–24	
2020	Bill Kinneberg	6–7	0–0	Season cancelled due to COVID-19 pandemic.
2021	Bill Kinneberg	17–33	7–23	
2022	Gary Henderson	26-27-1	10-20	
2023	Gary Henderson	1-4		
		201-335-1		
Total		1205-1628-2		

== Conference membership ==
- 1939–1962: Mountain States Conference
- 1963–1999: Western Athletic Conference
- 2000–2011: Mountain West Conference
- 2012–2024: Pac-12 Conference
- 2025-present: Big 12 Conference

== Utah in the NCAA tournament ==
1951
College World Series

Defeated Tennessee, 7–1
Lost to Southern California 2–8
Defeated Texas A&M15–8
Lost to Tennessee 4–5
Third Place

1959
District 7 playoffs

Lost to Colorado State College 8–17
Defeated Colorado State College 13–8
Lost to Colorado State College 8–12

1960
District 7 playoffs

Defeated Colorado State College 24–3
Lost to Colorado State College 2–3
Lost to Colorado State College 2–6

2009
Fullerton, CA Regional

Lost to Cal State Fullerton 2–18
Defeated Georgia Southern 11–10
Defeated Gonzaga 9–7
Lost to Cal State Fullerton 3–16

2016
Oxford, MS Regional

Defeated Ole Miss 6–5^{10}
Lost to Boston College 3–4
Lost to Tulane 1–4

== Individual awards ==
=== All Americans ===
- 1951

James Cleverly, 2B

- 1959

Archie Skeen, C

- 1981

Phil Strom, DH

- 1997

Casey Child, OF

- 2001

Chris Shelton, SS

- 2006

Ryan Khoury, SS

- 2010

C. J. Cron, DH

- 2011

C. J. Cron, 1B

=== Conference awards ===
- Mountain West Player of the Year

Chris Shelton – 2001
Mitch Maio – 2002
Ryan Khoury – 2006
C. J. Cron – 2010, 2011

- Mountain West Freshman of the Year

Mike Westfall, 2001
C. J. Cron, 2009

== Current and former major league players ==
- Billy Cowan
- Stephen Fife
- Randy Gomez
- John Noriega
- Bill Parsons
- Chris Shelton
- Steve Springer
- George Theodore
- C. J. Cron
- Oliver Dunn

Source: Baseball Reference

== See also ==
- List of NCAA Division I baseball programs
