= UNLV Rebels baseball =

UNLV Rebels
- 2026 UNLV Rebels baseball team
- Founded: February 25, 1967; 59 years ago
- University: University of Nevada, Las Vegas
- Head coach: Nick Garritano (1st season)
- Conference: Mountain West
- Location: Paradise, Nevada
- Home stadium: Earl Wilson Stadium (capacity: 3,000)
- Nickname: Rebels
- Colors: Scarlet and gray

NCAA tournament appearances
- 1978, 1980, 1981, 1984, 1988, 1989, 1996, 2003, 2004, 2005, 2014

Conference tournament champions
- Big West: 1996; Mountain West: 2003, 2004, 2005

Conference regular season champions
- Mountain West: 2003, 2005, 2014, 2022

The UNLV Rebels baseball team is a varsity intercollegiate athletic team of the University of Nevada, Las Vegas in Paradise, Nevada, United States. The team is a member of the Mountain West Conference, which is part of the National Collegiate Athletic Association's Division I. UNLV's first baseball team was fielded on February 25, 1967. The team plays its home games at Earl Wilson Stadium in Paradise, Nevada. The Rebels are coached by Nick Garritano.

== UNLV in the NCAA tournament ==
Year	Record	Pct	Notes
1978	1–2	.333	Rocky Mountain Regional
1980	3–2	.600	Midwest Regional
1981	0–2	.000	Mideast Regional
1984	1–2	.333	Central Regional
1988	1–2	.333	West II Regional
1989	1–2	.333	Central Regional
1996	0–2	.000	South II Regional
2003	2–2	.500	Tempe Regional
2004	0–2	.000	Palo Alto Regional
2005	1–2	.333	Tempe Regional
2014	1–2	.333	Corvallis Regional
TOTALS	11-22	.333	

== Year-by-year results ==
Record table
Season	Coach	Overall	Conference	Standing	Postseason
Southern California Intercollegiate Athletic Conference (1967–1969)
1967	Bob Doering	16–14–2	6–6		
1968	Bob Doering	23–14–1	6–6		
1969	Bob Doering	24–17–1	5–7		
SCIAC:		63–45–4 (.580)	17–19 (.472)		
West Coast Conference (1970–1975)
1970	Bob Doering	23–25–1	12–9	3rd	
1971	Bob Doering	21–19	5–15	7th	
1972	Bob Doering	23–24–1	6–12–1	T–6th	
1973	Bob Doering	27–15	11–7	3rd	
1974	Fred Dallimore	19–34	4–14	7th	
1975	Fred Dallimore	23–25	7–9	5th	
West Coast Conference:		136–142–2 (.489)	45–66–1 (.406)		
Independent (1976–1983)
1976	Fred Dallimore	31–25			
1977	Fred Dallimore	30–30			
1978	Fred Dallimore	44–20			NCAA Rocky Mountain Regional
1979	Fred Dallimore	41–23			
1980	Fred Dallimore	53–13–1			NCAA Midwest Regional
1981	Fred Dallimore	36–22			NCAA Mideast Regional
1982	Fred Dallimore	37–35			
1983	Fred Dallimore	34–28			
Independent:		306–196–1 (.609)			
Big West Conference (1984–1996)
1984	Fred Dallimore	43–26–1	17–10–1	2nd	NCAA Central Regional
1985	Fred Dallimore	40–21	17–13	2nd (South)	
1986	Fred Dallimore	35–22	14–7	2nd	
1987	Fred Dallimore	32–23	11–10	4th	
1988	Fred Dallimore	40–22	14–7	2nd	NCAA West II Regional
1989	Fred Dallimore	40–20	11–10	T–3rd	NCAA Central Regional
1990	Fred Dallimore	30–26	10–11	T–5th	
1991	Fred Dallimore	30–25	11–10	4th	
1992	Fred Dallimore	30–24	13–11	4th	
1993	Fred Dallimore	24–25	9–12	T–4th	
1994	Fred Dallimore	27–28	8–13	6th	
1995	Fred Dallimore	32–24	11–10	4th	
1996	Fred Dallimore	43–17	14–7	T–2nd	NCAA South II Regional
Big West:		446–303–1 (.595)	160–131–1 (.550)		
Western Athletic Conference (1997–1999)
1997	Rod Soesbe	24–31	10–19	3rd (South)	
1998	Rod Soesbe	31–24	13–17	4th (South)	
1999	Rod Soesbe	27–34	16–14	4th	
Western Athletic Conference:		82–89 (.480)	39–50 (.438)		
Mountain West Conference (2000–present)
2000	Rod Soesbe	24–33	14–16	5th	
2001	Rod Soesbe	23–33	13–17	5th	
2002	Jim Schlossnagle	30–30	13–17	5th	Mountain West tournament
2003	Jim Schlossnagle	47–17	24–6	1st	NCAA Tempe Regional
2004	Buddy Gouldsmith	37–24	20–10	T–2nd	NCAA Stanford Regional
2005	Buddy Gouldsmith	35–29	23–7	1st	NCAA Tempe Regional
2006	Buddy Gouldsmith	28–30	12–10	4th	
2007	Buddy Gouldsmith	24–36	10–14	6th	
2008	Buddy Gouldsmith	22–37	10–15	6th	
2009	Buddy Gouldsmith	26–32	9–15	5th	
2010	Buddy Gouldsmith	29–29	11–13	5th	
2011	Tim Chambers	33–25	10–13	5th	
2012	Tim Chambers	26–31	7–17	4th	
2013	Tim Chambers	37–20	18–12	2nd	
2014	Tim Chambers	36–25	20–10	T–1st	NCAA Corvallis Regional
2015	Tim Chambers	25–31	10–20	6th	
2016	Stan Stolte	24–32	14–16	4th	
2017	Stan Stolte	20–36	10–20	7th	
2018	Stan Stolte	35–24	14–16	4th	
2019	Stan Stolte	29–29	14–16	4th	
2020	Stan Stolte	6–11	0–0		Season canceled due to COVID-19
2021	Stan Stolte	20–13	15–12	3rd	
2022	Stan Stolte	36–22	21–9	1st	
Mountain West:		652–629 (.509)	312–301 (.509)		
Total:		1685–1404–8 (.545)			
National champion Postseason invitational champion Conference regular season champion Conference regular season and conference tournament champion Division regular season champion Division regular season and conference tournament champion Conference tournament champion

== Major League Baseball ==
UNLV had 121 Major League Baseball draft selections since the draft began in 1965.

Rebels in the Major League Baseball Draft
Year	Player	Round	Team
1970	Ralph Garcia	18	Padres
1976	David Denton	11	Red Sox
1977	Monte Mendenhall	21	Angels
1978	Michael Guerra	17	Mariners
1978	Vance McHenry	11	Mariners
1979	Daniel Fischer	26	Royals
1979	Leonard Jones	21	Indians
1980	Dan Murphy	18	Rangers
1980	Randy Ward	13	Athletics
1980	Kenneth Elsee	4	Astros
1981	Mark Bloomfield	27	Royals
1981	Frank DeSantis	23	Braves
1981	William Finnegan	8	Cardinals
1982	Frank DeSantis	8	Cubs
1984	Glenn Zielinski	24	Reds
1985	Mike Oglesbee	23	Reds
1985	Tim Arnold	12	Angels
1985	John Stein	12	White Sox
1985	Mel Stottlemyre Jr.	1	Astros
1986	Reginald Farmer	37	Indians
1986	Greg Roscoe	28	Giants
1986	Mike Oglesbee	8	Royals
1986	Steve Moser	5	Pirates
1986	Matt Williams	1	Giants
1987	Rodger Castner	50	Pirates
1987	Robert Chadwick	35	Phillies
1987	Bob Ayrault	26	Pirates
1987	Reed Peters	12	Angels
1987	Greg Roscoe	9	Indians
1987	Reginald Farmer	9	Padres
1988	Scott Lewis	11	Angels
1988	David Sturdivant	10	Angels
1989	Kevin Lofthus	47	Athletics
1989	Gary Forrester	20	Dodgers
1990	Layne Lambert	15	Astros
1990	Brian Boehringer	10	Astros
1990	Donovan Osborne	1	Cardinals
1991	Steve Cerio	42	Cardinals
1991	Larry Lucchetti	31	Cardinals
1991	Lance Schuermann	11	Rangers
1991	Doug Vanderweele	9	Giants
1991	Brian Boehringer	4	White Sox
1992	T.J. Mathews	36	Cardinals
1992	J.J. Jarolimek	29	Cubs
1992	Aaron Turnier	24	Braves
1992	Dan Madsen	21	Cubs
1993	Lino Diaz	30	Royals
1993	Rodney Mazion	15	Mets
1993	Eric Ludwick	2	Mets
1994	Demond Thompkins	62	Royals
1995	Joel Garber	32	White Sox
1995	Trav McClendon	22	Cardinals
1996	Brian Anthony	25	Rockies
1996	Paul Tanner	22	Cardinals
1996	Mike Bauder	22	Twins
1996	Shaw Casey	19	Marlins
1996	Stacy Kleiner	16	Cardinals
1996	Robert Luce	9	Mariners
1996	Nate Yeskie	9	Twins
1996	Tom LaRosa	6	Twins
1997	Chris Humphries	32	Phillies
1997	Ryan Hankins	13	White Sox
1997	Toby Hall	9	Devil Rays
1998	Mike Zipser	26	Phillies
1999	Toby Harris	24	Diamondbacks
1999	James Close	22	Marlins
1999	Eliott Sarabia	20	Pirates
1999	Brian Hertel	17	Mariners
1999	Ryan Ludwick	2	Athletics
2000	Andy McCulloch	20	Blue Jays
2000	Luke Anderson	18	Giants
2001	Ryan Olson	10	Mets
2003	Brent Johnson	44	Blue Jays
2003	Pat Dobson	18	Giants
2003	Chris Dickerson	16	Reds
2003	Fernando Valenzuela	10	Padres
2003	Robbie Van	8	Diamondbacks
2003	Mateo Miramontes	6	Mets
2003	Ryan Braun	6	Royals
2004	Matthew Minor	47	Giants
2004	David Seccombe	29	Red Sox
2004	Ryan Ruiz	19	Athletics
2004	Brent Johnson	14	Mariners
2004	Jake Vose	13	Padres
2004	Eric Nielsen	12	Blue Jays
2004	Ben Scheinbaum	10	Yankees
2005	Wayne Foltin	31	Giants
2005	Matthew Luca	27	Astros
2005	Zeke Parraz	25	Athletics
2005	Derek Rodriguez	14	White Sox
2006	Kevin Skogley	30	Angels
2007	Efren Navarro	50	Angels
2007	Craig Heyer	22	Yankees
2007	Kevin Skogley	12	White Sox
2008	Jeff Urlaub	47	Marlins
2008	Michael Brenly	36	Cubs
2008	Xavier Scruggs	19	Cardinals
2009	Marc Baca	42	Pirates
2009	Chad Nading	37	Rangers
2009	Jay Sferra	31	Nationals
2010	Jarred Frierson	36	Braves
2010	Drew Beuerlein	32	Angels
2010	Matt Hutchison	25	Phillies
2011	Joe Robinson	29	Dodgers
2011	Tanner Peters	16	Athletics
2012	Brandon Bayardi	36	Twins
2013	Brandon Bayardi	36	Angels
2013	Mark Shannon	24	Angels
2013	Andy Beresford	19	Yankees
2013	Buddy Borden	7	Pirates
2014	Patrick Armstrong	39	Angels
2014	T.J. White	18	Twins
2014	John Richy	3	Dodgers
2014	Erick Fedde	1	Nationals
2015	Bryan Bonnell	36	Rays
2015	Joey Lauria	25	Phillies
2015	Joey Armstrong	10	Diamondbacks
2016	Dean Kremer	14	Dodgers
2016	D.J. Myers	15	Giants
2016	Ben Wright	16	White Sox
2016	Kenny Oakley	32	Rockies
2019	Bryson Stott	1	Phillies

== See also ==
- List of NCAA Division I baseball programs
