= New Mexico Lobos baseball =

- 2026 New Mexico Lobos baseball team
- Founded: 1899
- University: University of New Mexico
- Head coach: Tod Brown (5th season)
- Conference: Mountain West
- Location: Albuquerque, New Mexico
- Home stadium: Santa Ana Star Field (capacity: 1,000)
- Colors: Cherry and silver

NCAA tournament appearances
- 1962, 2011, 2012, 2013, 2016

Conference tournament champions
- Skyline: 1962; MWC: 2011, 2012, 2016

Conference regular season champions
- Skyline (Eastern Division): 1953, 1958, 1962; WAC (Southern Division): 1985; MWC: 2000, 2012, 2013, 2014, 2017

New Mexico Lobos baseball is a college baseball program of the University of New Mexico in Albuquerque, New Mexico. The Lobos have won three conference tournaments, finished first in regular season conference play eight times, and appeared in the NCAA Division I Baseball Championship five times. The team plays their home games on the University of New Mexico campus at Santa Ana Star Field. Tod Brown has been the head coach of the Lobos since the 2022 season.

== History ==
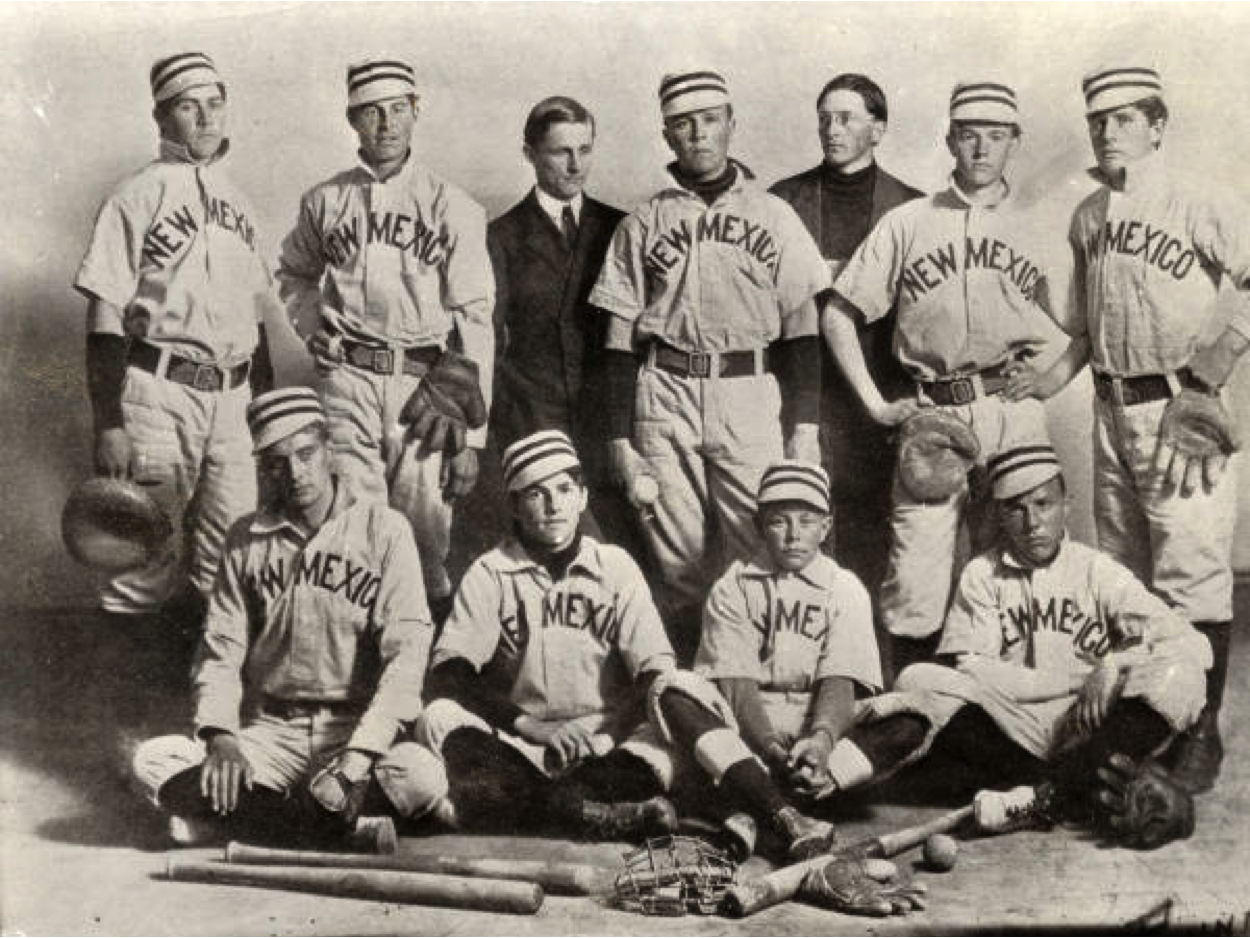
New Mexico Lobos baseball team in 1906

The first team was fielded in 1899 and has a 1,820–1,645–16 (.523) record through the 2022 season. The 2022 season was the 105th season that the University of New Mexico has field a baseball team (the team did not play 19 seasons: 1902, 1903, 1909, 1918, 1924–1926, 1928, 1930–1938, 1944, and 1945).

In 1951, the Lobos began play in the Skyline Eight Conference, recording a first place regular season finish in the Eastern Division in 1953, 1958, and their final season in the conference in 1962. The 1962 season also saw the Lobos participate in the NCAA Division I Baseball Championship for the first time.

UNM was a charter member of the Western Athletic Conference (WAC) and begin conference play with Arizona, Arizona State, BYU, Utah, and Wyoming in 1963. Until leaving the WAC to become a charter member of the Mountain West Conference (MW) in 2000, the Lobos finished first in the regular season standings only once, 1985 in the Southern Division, and lost to BYU in a postseason playoff series.

As a member of the MW, the Lobos have finished first in the regular season in six seasons: 2000, 2011, 2012, 2013, 2014, and 2017. The Lobos returned to the NCAA Division I Baseball Championship in 2000, the second time in program history. The Lobos won the Mountain West Conference baseball tournament in 2011, 2012, and 2016.

The Lobos have had 27 different players earn All-America honors. Additionally, they have had 11 players be named Freshman All-America. In 2013 D. J. Peterson became the first player in program history to become a three-time All-American.

UNM has had 93 players selected in the MLB draft in its history, including a pair of first-round picks: Kevin Andersh in 1985, and Peterson in 2013. Since Birmingham took over the team has had 24 players selected, including a school-record seven in 2013.

New Mexico student-athletes have set numerous NCAA records including season batting average (Keith Hagman, 1980 - .551), most triples (Hagman, 1980 - 17), RBIs in an inning (Jonathan Gallegos, 8 - vs. Utah, March 13, 1993) and doubles by a freshman (Peterson, 32 - 2011). The team also has several records including hits by both teams (68 vs. Fresno State - April 1, 1999), triples in a game (7 vs. CSU-Pueblo - March 27, 1976) and plate appearances in an inning (25 vs. Utah - March 13, 1993).

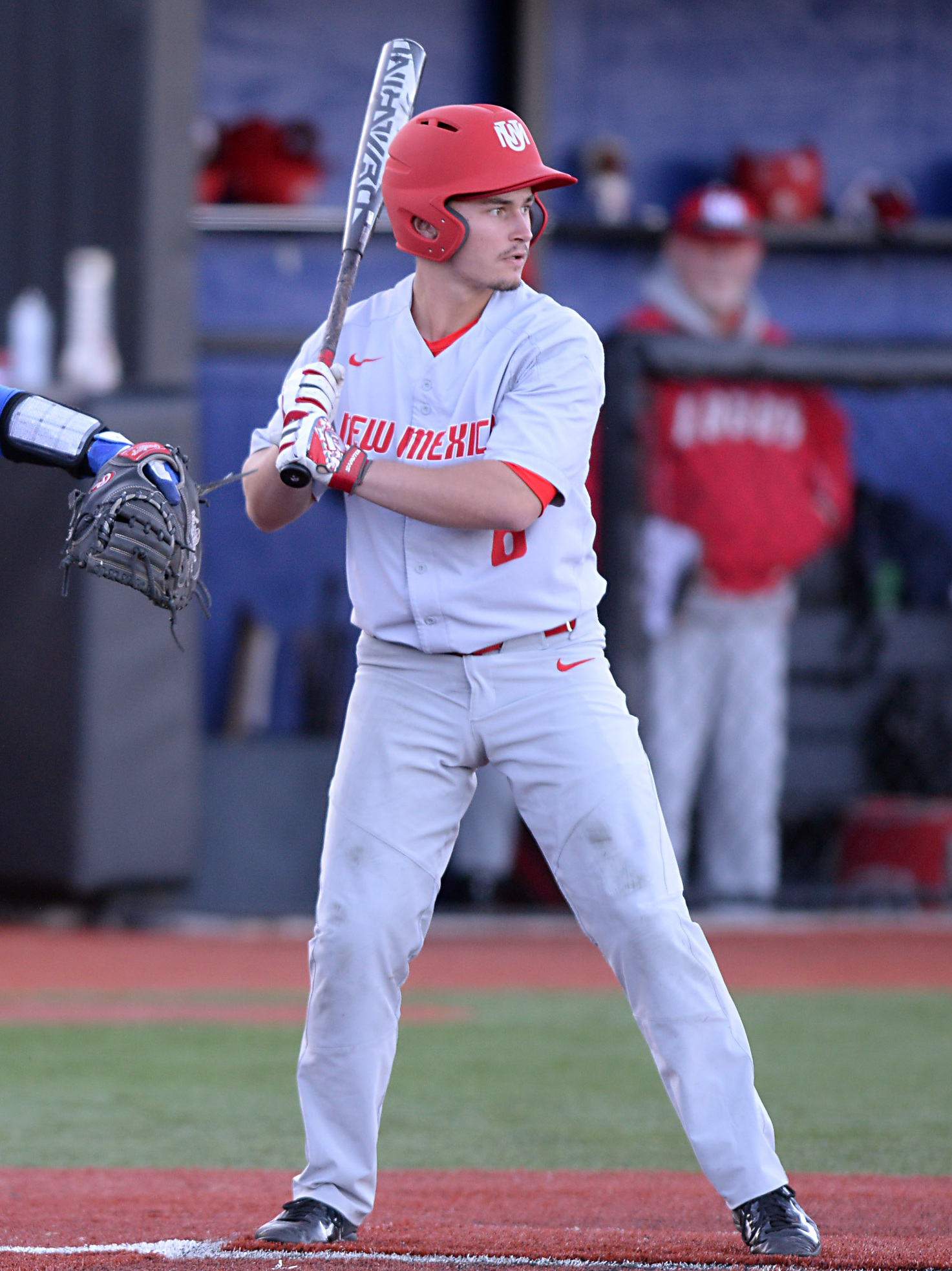
A Lobos batter during a game in 2017

== New Mexico in the NCAA tournament ==
| Year | Record | Pct | Notes |
|---|---|---|---|
| 1962 | 1–2 | .333 | District 7 |
| 2011 | 0–2 | .000 | Tempe Regional |
| 2012 | 1–2 | .333 | Los Angeles Regional |
| 2013 | 0–2 | .000 | Fullerton Regional |
| 2016 | 1–2 | .333 | Lubbock Regional |
| TOTALS | 3-10 | .231 | |

== Ballparks ==
=== Santa Ana Star Field ===
Santa Ana Star Field is the home of UNM baseball. After spending nine and a half seasons across the street at Isotopes Park, UNM returned to Santa Ana Star Field for good on March 24, 2013, as the Lobos hosted a doubleheader against the Nevada Wolf Pack.

Santa Ana Star Field received a major upgrade that started before the 2013 season. It received a FieldTurf playing surface, upgraded scoreboard, dugouts, bullpens, and bleachers as a part of the first phase of the Lobo Field renovation. Further renovations enhanced the concession areas, the fan plaza between Lobo Field and the softball field, the press box and the bleachers. Lights were installed in the fall of 2013, and a new clubhouse was dedicated December 28, 2016.

"We have lights because of (former Lobo) Dee Dennis and a bunch of guys who chipped in to help me and Dee do this," Birmingham said. "This is Lobo Field. This is (the state of) New Mexico’s baseball field, at least that’s how I feel about it. ... There will not only be Lobo games on here, but there will also be state championship games here. We hope to bring in some great big tournaments over the years to this city and let our kids experience the world. We think New Mexico kids can get the rest of the experiences that the rest of the country has, then they will grow faster and realize they’re as good as anybody.”

After nine years at Isotopes Park, the Lobos returned to Lobo Field in March 2013. From 2013–2022, the team had a 94-38-1 (.711) record at home.

On December 16, 2015, UNM announced it had reached a 10-year, $1 million deal with Bernalillo company Tamaya Enterprises to rename the stadium Santa Ana Star Field. UNM used the money for further renovations to the field.

=== Isotopes Park ===
The Lobos played at Isotopes Park from 2003 until partway through the 2013 season when they returned to Lobo Field full-time.

== People ==
=== Head coaches ===
The Lobos' head coach since the 2022 season has been Tod Brown. Ray Birmingham had a record of 467–413–4 (.531) in fifteen seasons at head coach. He took over for Rich Alday, who coached the Lobos for 18 season (1990–2007) and posted a record of 515–513–3 (.501). Prior to him Vince Cappelli was coach for 13 seasons from 1977–89, and he obtained a record of 384–350–6 (.523). Bob Leigh was the head coach from 1966–76, and in his 11 season he coached the Lobos to a record of 309–212–2 (.593). The first post-WWII head coach for UNM was George Petrol who was in charge of the program from 1947–65. In his 19 seasons the Lobos posted a record of 195–240–1 (.448).

=== Players ===
Former Lobo players include:

- Justin Armbruester
- Bob Barney
- Dave Barney
- David Carpenter
- Jim Fregosi
- Mitch Garver
- Luis González
- Daniel Herrera
- Larry Jaster
- Mark Johnson
- Jim Kremmel
- Bobby LaFromboise
- Rod Nichols
- Jordan Pacheco
- D. J. Peterson
- Jimmy Serrano
- Scott Strickland
- Jamie Vermilyea
- Matt Young
