= 2018 San Diego State Aztecs baseball team =

American college baseball season

2018 San Diego State Aztecs baseball

Mountain West tournament champions

NCAA tournament, Corvallis Regional
- Conference: Mountain West Conference
- Record: 39–21 (18–12 MW)
- Head coach: Mark Martinez (4th season)
- Hitting coach: Joe Oliveira (6th season)
- Pitching coach: Sam Peraza (3rd season)
- Home stadium: Tony Gwynn Stadium (Capacity: 3,000)

2018 Mountain West Conference baseball standings
	Conf.						Overall
Team	W		L		T	PCT	W		L		T	PCT
Nevada ‍‍‍	20	–	9	–	0	.690	29	–	22	–	0	.569
San Diego State ‍‍‍	18	–	12	–	0	.600	36	–	19	–	0	.655
San Jose State ‍‍‍	16	–	14	–	0	.533	26	–	28	–	0	.481
UNLV ‍‍‍	14	–	16	–	0	.467	33	–	22	–	0	.600
Fresno State ‍‍‍	13	–	17	–	0	.433	30	–	24	–	0	.556
Air Force ‍‍‍	12	–	17	–	0	.414	24	–	30	–	0	.444
New Mexico ‍‍‍	11	–	19	–	0	.367	19	–	33	–	1	.368
As of May 20, 2018; Rankings from Collegiate Baseball

The 2018 San Diego State Aztecs baseball team represented San Diego State University in the 2018 NCAA Division I baseball season as a member of the Mountain West Conference. The team was coached by Mark Martinez and played their home games at Tony Gwynn Stadium.

== Previous season ==
The Aztecs finished 42–21 overall, and 20–10 in the conference. During the season, the Aztecs were invited and participated in the Tony Gwynn Classic in San Diego, California. San Diego State defeated Notre Dame to earn 5th place. In the postseason, San Diego State defeated New Mexico in the semifinals and Fresno State twice in the quarterfinals and championship to earn 1st place in the 2017 Mountain West Conference baseball tournament in Albuquerque, New Mexico. The Aztecs were invited and participated in the 2017 NCAA Division I baseball tournament, where they defeated UCLA but lost to Long Beach State twice in the Long Beach Regional in Long Beach, California.

=== MLB draft selections ===
The Aztecs had five individuals selected in the 2017 MLB draft.

Player	Position	Round	Overall	MLB Team
Brett Seeburger	Pitcher	10	304	St. Louis Cardinals
Alan Trejo	Shortstop	16	476	Colorado Rockies
C.J. Saylor	Pitcher	28	844	St. Louis Cardinals
Tyler Adkison	Right fielder	32	970	Los Angeles Dodgers
Marcus Reyes	Pitcher	38	1149	Toronto Blue Jays

== Roster ==
2018 San Diego State Aztecs baseball team
Players
Coaches

#	Pos.	Name	B/T	Height	Weight	Year	Previous school	Home town
1	OF	Julian Escobedo	L/L	5 ft 11 in (1.8 m)	175 lb (79 kg)	So	Eastlake High School	San Diego, California
2	C	Ryan Orr	R/R	5 ft 10 in (1.78 m)	170 lb (77 kg)	So	La Costa Canyon High School	San Diego, California
3	INF	Jacob Maekawa	R/R	5 ft 9 in (1.75 m)	170 lb (77 kg)	So	Mid-Pacific Institute	Mililani, Hawaii
5	INF	Isaiah Parra	R/R	5 ft 10 in (1.78 m)	185 lb (84 kg)	Fr	Cypress High School	Cypress, California
8	INF	Casey Schmitt	R/R	6 ft 2 in (1.88 m)	200 lb (91 kg)	Fr	Eastlake High School	San Diego, California
9	OF	Matt Rudick	L/L	5 ft 9 in (1.75 m)	170 lb (77 kg)	Fr	Scripps Ranch High School	San Diego, California
10	INF	Nicholas Israel	S/R	5 ft 10 in (1.78 m)	175 lb (79 kg)	Fr	Bishop Gorman High School	Las Vegas, Nevada
12	RHP	Adrian Mardueno	R/R	5 ft 10 in (1.78 m)	170 lb (77 kg)	So	Upland High School	Upland, California
13	RHP	Casey O'Sullivan	R/R	6 ft 2 in (1.88 m)	185 lb (84 kg)	Fr	Valhalla High School	San Diego, California
14	INF	Spencer Weston	R/R	5 ft 11 in (1.8 m)	185 lb (84 kg)	Fr	Woodbridge High School	Irvine, California
15	RHP	Logan Boyer	R/R	6 ft 3 in (1.91 m)	215 lb (98 kg)	So	Hamilton High School	Chandler, Arizona
18	C	Joe Fitzhugh	R/R	6 ft 2 in (1.88 m)	185 lb (84 kg)	So	Arbor View High School	Las Vegas, Nevada
20	RHP	Ray Lambert	R/R	6 ft 1 in (1.85 m)	190 lb (86 kg)	Sr	Ventura College	Thousand Oaks, California
21	INF	Jordan Verdon	L/R	6 ft 3 in (1.91 m)	190 lb (86 kg)	Jr	Granite Hills High School	San Diego, California
22	INF	David Henley	R/R	6 ft 6 in (1.98 m)	185 lb (84 kg)	Sr	Patrick Henry High School	San Diego, California
23	OF	Chad Bible (redshirt)	R/R	6 ft 1 in (1.85 m)	225 lb (102 kg)	RS Jr	College of the Canyons	Valencia, California
24	LHP	Noah Fluman	L/L	5 ft 10 in (1.78 m)	165 lb (75 kg)	Fr	El Toro High School	Lake Forest, California
25	C	Dean Nevarez	R/R	6 ft 0 in (1.83 m)	220 lb (100 kg)	Jr	Eastlake High School	San Diego, California
27	RHP	Jorge Fernandez	R/R	5 ft 11 in (1.8 m)	200 lb (91 kg)	Sr	San Jacinto College	Del Rio, Texas
28	RHP	John Dearth	R/R	6 ft 5 in (1.96 m)	195 lb (88 kg)	Fr	South Hills High School	Covina, California
29	LHP	Travis Weston	L/L	6 ft 0 in (1.83 m)	180 lb (82 kg)	Fr	Moorpark High School	Moorpark, California
30	RHP	Daniel Ritcheson	R/R	6 ft 4 in (1.93 m)	205 lb (93 kg)	Fr	Alemany High School	Los Angeles, California
31	RHP	Harrison Pyatt	R/R	6 ft 5 in (1.96 m)	220 lb (100 kg)	Jr	Esperanza High School	Corona, California
32	OF	Denz'l Chapman	S/R	5 ft 10 in (1.78 m)	185 lb (84 kg)	Sr	Junípero Serra High School	Los Angeles, California
33	LHP	Christian Winston	L/L	6 ft 5 in (1.96 m)	180 lb (82 kg)	Fr	Barstow High School	Barstow, California
34	OF	Chase Calabuig	L/L	5 ft 11 in (1.8 m)	185 lb (84 kg)	Sr	Capistrano Valley High School	Mission Viejo, California
36	LHP	Jacob Flores	L/L	6 ft 4 in (1.93 m)	210 lb (95 kg)	Fr	Rio Mesa High School	Oxnard, California
38	LHP	Jacob Erickson	L/L	5 ft 9 in (1.75 m)	185 lb (84 kg)	Sr	Mater Dei High School	Orange, California
39	RHP	Garrett Hill (redshirt)	R/R	6 ft 0 in (1.83 m)	175 lb (79 kg)	RS Jr	Santa Rosa Junior College	Petaluma, California
40	OF	Sean Ross	R/R	6 ft 0 in (1.83 m)	200 lb (91 kg)	Fr	Granite Hills High School	San Diego, California
41	INF	Grant Mayeaux (redshirt)	R/R	6 ft 2 in (1.88 m)	190 lb (86 kg)	RS Sr	Cypress College	Huntington Beach, California
42	RHP	Tre Brown	R/R	6 ft 3 in (1.91 m)	170 lb (77 kg)	So	Eastlake High School	San Diego, California
43	RHP	Clark Eder	R/R	6 ft 4 in (1.93 m)	190 lb (86 kg)	Fr	California High School	San Ramon, California
48	RHP	Justin Goossen-Brown (redshirt)	L/R	6 ft 2 in (1.88 m)	190 lb (86 kg)	RS Jr	Los Angeles Valley College	Sherman Oaks, California

Head coach

Mark Martinez Colorado Mesa

Assistant coach(es)

Danny Benedetti St. John's

Hitting coach(es)

Joe Oliveira San Diego State

Pitching coach(es)

Sam Peraza Pacific

Legend

- (C) Team captain
- (S) Suspended
- (I) Ineligible
- Injured
- Current redshirt

Roster
Last update: June 4, 2018

== Schedule ==
2018 San Diego State Aztecs baseball season game log
Regular season

February
Date	Time	Opponent	Rank	Site stadium	Score	Win	Loss	Save	Attendance	Overall record (MW Record)
February 16	6:00 p.m.	UC Santa Barbara		Tony Gwynn Stadium; San Diego, California	9–1	**Erickson** **(1–0)**	Davis (0–1)	—	1,045	1–0 (0–0)
February 17	6:00 p.m.	UC Santa Barbara		Tony Gwynn Stadium; San Diego, California	8–4	**Mardueno** **(1–0)**	Ledesma (0–1)	—	1,682	2–0 (0–0)
February 18	1:00 p.m.	UC Santa Barbara		Tony Gwynn Stadium; San Diego, California	7–5	**Hill** **(1–0)**	Clements (0–1)	**Goossen (1)**	1,384	3–0 (0–0)
February 20	6:00 p.m.	San Diego; Rivalry		Tony Gwynn Stadium; San Diego, California	2–3^{10}	Friedman (1–1)	**Fernandez** **(0–1)**	—	366	3–1 (0–0)
February 23	6:00 p.m.	No. 27 Arizona; Tony Gwynn Classic		Tony Gwynn Stadium; San Diego, California	3–2^{10}	**Fernandez** **(1–1)**	Megill (0–1)	—	1,224	4–1 (0–0)
February 24	6:00 p.m.	No. 3 Arkansas; Tony Gwynn Classic		Tony Gwynn Stadium; San Diego, California	2–5	Cronin (2–0)	**Ritcheson** **(0–1)**	—	1,532	4–2 (0–0)
February 25	2:00 p.m.	Grand Canyon; Tony Gwynn Classic		Tony Gwynn Stadium; San Diego, California	5–4	**O'Sullivan** **(1–0)**	Vorhof (0–2)	**Fernandez (1)**	1,078	5–2 (0–0)
February 26	6:00 p.m.	Michigan		Tony Gwynn Stadium; San Diego, California	4–3	**Goossen** **(1–0)**	Vancena (0–1)	**Fernandez (2)**	505	6–2 (0–0)
February 27	6:30 p.m.	UC Irvine		Anteater Ballpark; Irvine, California	4–9	Garcia (1–0)	**Lambert** **(0–1)**	—	419	6–3 (0–0)

March
Date	Time	Opponent	Rank	Site stadium	Score	Win	Loss	Save	Attendance	Overall record (MW Record)
March 4	11:00 a.m.	San Jose State		San Jose Municipal Stadium; San Jose, California	7–2	**Pyatt** **(1–0)**	Morales (1–1)	—	361	7–3 (1–0)
March 4	2:00 p.m.	San Jose State		San Jose Municipal Stadium; San Jose, California	11–1	**Hill** **(2–0)**	Ross (0–2)	—	361	8–3 (2–0)
March 6	5:00 p.m.	Arizona		Hi Corbett Field; Tucson, Arizona	4–13	Aguilera (2–0)	**Goossen** **(1–1)**	—	2,503	8–4 (2–0)
March 9	6:00 p.m.	Air Force		Tony Gwynn Stadium; San Diego, California	3–2	**Fernandez** **(2–1)**	Gilbert (1–1)	—	707	9–4 (3–0)
March 11	11:00 a.m.	Air Force		Tony Gwynn Stadium; San Diego, California	3–7	Hargreaves (1–3)	**Pyatt** **(1–1)**	—	381	9–5 (3–1)
March 11	2:00 p.m.	Air Force		Tony Gwynn Stadium; San Diego, California	3–2	**Hill** **(3–0)**	Holloway (1–1)	**Fernandez (3)**	801	10–5 (4–1)
March 13	6:00 p.m.	San Diego; Rivalry		Fowler Park; San Diego, California	9–3	**Ritcheson** **(1–1)**	Donatella (1–1)	—	1,064	11–5 (4–1)
March 16	6:00 p.m.	Cal Poly		Robin Baggett Stadium; San Luis Obispo, California	9–7	**Fernandez** **(3–1)**	Zill (0–2)	**Flores (1)**	1,150	12–5 (4–1)
March 17	6:00 p.m.	Cal Poly		Robin Baggett Stadium; San Luis Obispo, California	4–5	Schneider (2–2)	**Schmitt** **(0–1)**	—	1,395	12–6 (4–1)
March 18	1:00 p.m.	Cal Poly		Robin Baggett Stadium; San Luis Obispo, California	3–2	**Hill** **(4–0)**	Nelson (2–2)	**Fernandez (4)**	1,321	13–6 (4–1)
March 20	6:00 p.m.	CSU Bakersfield		Tony Gwynn Stadium; San Diego, California	5–4	**Mardueno** **(2–0)**	Dewsnap (1–1)	—	655	14–6 (4–1)
March 23	6:00 p.m.	No. 19 UNLV		Earl Wilson Stadium; Paradise, Nevada	3–4	Anderson (2–0)	**Erickson** **(1–1)**	Menendez (7)	776	14–7 (4–2)
March 24	2:00 p.m.	No. 19 UNLV		Earl Wilson Stadium; Paradise, Nevada	17–8	**Hill** **(5–0)**	Horn (2–1)	—	676	15–7 (5–2)
March 25	1:00 p.m.	No. 19 UNLV		Earl Wilson Stadium; Paradise, Nevada	22–7	**Ritcheson** **(2–1)**	Maddux (2–3)	—	886	16–7 (6–2)
March 27	6:00 p.m.	Long Beach State	No. 24	Blair Field; Long Beach, California	5–2	**Mardueno** **(3–0)**	Seminaris (1–3)	**Fernandez (5)**	1,954	17–7 (6–2)
March 29	6:00 p.m.	New Mexico	No. 24	Tony Gwynn Stadium; San Diego, California	4–5	Emond (3–1)	**Fernandez** **(3–2)**	Tripp (6)	546	17–8 (6–3)
March 30	6:00 p.m.	New Mexico	No. 24	Tony Gwynn Stadium; San Diego, California	5–9	Garley (2–1)	**Pyatt** **(1–2)**	—	743	17–9 (6–4)
March 31	1:00 p.m.	New Mexico	No. 24	Tony Gwynn Stadium; San Diego, California	3–2	**Hill** **(6–0)**	Dye (2–4)	'**Fernandez (6)**	413	18–9 (7–4)

April
Date	Time	Opponent	Rank	Site stadium	Score	Win	Loss	Save	Attendance	Overall record (MW Record)
April 2	1:00 p.m.	Washington		Tony Gwynn Stadium; San Diego, California	6–4	**Erickson** **(2–1)**	Emanuels (4–2)	**Schmitt (1)**	609	19–9 (7–4)
April 3	6:00 p.m.	Long Beach State		Lake Elsinore Diamond; Lake Elsinore, California	5–1	**Pyatt** **(2–2)**	Seminaris (1–4)	—	400	20–9 (7–4)
April 7	11:00 a.m.	Air Force		Falcon Baseball Field; Colorado Springs, Colorado	0–2	Biancalana (3–1)	**Hill** **(6–1)**	Holloway (1)	111	20–10 (7–5)
April 7	2:00 p.m.	Air Force		Falcon Baseball Field; Colorado Springs, Colorado	7–12	Kelley (1–0)	**Fernandez** **(3–3)**	—	111	20–11 (7–6)
April 8	12:00 p.m.	Air Force		Falcon Baseball Field; Colorado Springs, Colorado	15–11	**Mardueno** **(4–0)**	Mortenson (1–5)	—	101	21–11 (8–6)
April 10	6:00 p.m.	UC Irvine		Tony Gwynn Stadium; San Diego, California	2–10	Denholm (2–4)	**Erickson** **(2–2)**	—	559	21–12 (8–6)
April 13	6:00 p.m.	CSU Fullerton		Tony Gwynn Stadium; San Diego, California	6–3	**Erickson** **(3–2)**	Eastman (4–3)	**Schmitt (2)**	681	22–12 (8–6)
April 14	6:00 p.m.	CSU Fullerton		Tony Gwynn Stadium; San Diego, California	9–13	Conine (1–0)	**Mardueno** **(4–1)**	—	1,203	22–13 (8–6)
April 15	1:00 p.m.	CSU Fullerton		Tony Gwynn Stadium; San Diego, California	9–6	**Winston** **(1–0)**	Quezada (1–4)	**Schmitt (3)**	1,203	23–13 (8–6)
April 17	6:00 p.m.	CSU Northridge		Tony Gwynn Stadium; San Diego, California	3–2	**Mardueno** **(5–1)**	Shenefield (1–2)	**Schmitt (4)**	318	24–13 (8–6)
April 20	6:00 p.m.	Fresno State; Rivalry		Tony Gwynn Stadium; San Diego, California	3–2	**Mardueno** **(6–1)**	Jensen (2–4)	**Schmitt (5)**	459	25–13 (9–6)
April 21	6:00 p.m.	Fresno State; Rivalry		Tony Gwynn Stadium; San Diego, California	4–7	Gonzalez (6–2)	**Hill** **(6–2)**	—	863	25–14 (9–7)
April 22	1:00 p.m.	Fresno State; Rivalry		Tony Gwynn Stadium; San Diego, California	7–0	**Fernandez** **(4–3)**	Arias (4–1)	—	829	26–14 (10–7)
April 24	6:00 p.m.	UC Riverside		Riverside Sports Complex; Riverside, California	19–1	**Goossen** **(2–1)**	Noonan (1–2)	—	172	27–14 (10–7)
April 27	6:00 p.m.	UNLV		Tony Gwynn Stadium; San Diego, California	1–0	**Pyatt** **(3–2)**	Strong (6–2)	**Schmitt (6)**	785	28–14 (11–7)
April 28	6:00 p.m.	UNLV		Tony Gwynn Stadium; San Diego, California	7–6	**Goossen** **(3–1)**	Bohall (3–2)	**Hensley (1)**	489	29–14 (12–7)
April 29	1:00 p.m.	UNLV		Tony Gwynn Stadium; San Diego, California	4–2	**Fernandez** **(5–3)**	Horn (3–4)	**Schmitt (7)**	795	30–14 (13–7)

May
Date	Time	Opponent	Rank	Site stadium	Score	Win	Loss	Save	Attendance	Overall record (MW Record)
May 1	6:00 p.m.	UC Riverside		Tony Gwynn Stadium; San Diego, California	8–6	**Goossen** **(4–1)**	Breidenthal (1–1)	**Schmitt (8)**	283	31–14 (13–7)
May 4	5:30 p.m.	New Mexico		Santa Ana Star Field; Albuquerque, New Mexico	11–5	**Pyatt** **(4–2)**	Slaten (2–8)	**Winston (1)**	675	32–14 (14–7)
May 5	1:00 p.m.	New Mexico		Santa Ana Star Field; Albuquerque, New Mexico	3–4	Dye (4–6)	**Goossen** **(4–2)**	Tripp (8)	533	32–15 (14–8)
May 6	12:00 p.m.	New Mexico		Santa Ana Star Field; Albuquerque, New Mexico	7–3	**Fernandez** **(6–3)**	Garley (2–3)	**Schmitt (9)**	671	33–15 (15–8)
May 11	6:00 p.m.	San Jose State		Tony Gwynn Stadium; San Diego, California	2–3	Swiech (3–3)	**Pyatt** **(4–3)**	Bonta (4)	451	33–16 (15–9)
May 12	2:00 p.m.	San Jose State		Tony Gwynn Stadium; San Diego, California	2–1	**Goossen** **(5–2)**	Mitchel (6–1)	—	331	34–16 (16–9)
May 12	6:00 p.m.	San Jose State		Tony Gwynn Stadium; San Diego, California	16–4	**Hill** **(7–2)**	Goldberg (2–7)	—	791	35–16 (17–9)
May 13	1:00 p.m.	San Jose State		Tony Gwynn Stadium; San Diego, California	4–6^{10}	Bonta (4–3)	**Erickson** **(3–3)**	Clawson (6)	489	35–17 (17–10)
May 17	6:00 p.m.	Nevada		William Peccole Park; Reno, Nevada	12–7	**Mardueno** **(7–1)**	Bonnenfant (0–1)	—	750	36–17 (18–10)
May 18	6:00 p.m.	Nevada		William Peccole Park; Reno, Nevada	3–13	Gomez (3–3)	**Pyatt** **(4–4)**	—	793	36–18 (18–11)
May 19	12:00 p.m.	Nevada		William Peccole Park; Reno, Nevada	10–12	Anderson (3–1)	**Goossen** **(5–3)**	Cabinian (9)	765	36–19 (18–12)

Postseason

Mountain West Tournament
Date	Time	Opponent	Rank	Site stadium	Score	Win	Loss	Save	Attendance	Overall record
May 24	6:00 p.m.	(3) San Jose State; Quarterfinals	(2)	Tony Gwynn Stadium; San Diego, California	2–1	**Erickson** **(4–3)**	Mitchel (6–2)	—	826	37–19
May 25	6:00 p.m.	(4) UNLV; Semifinals	(2)	Tony Gwynn Stadium; San Diego, California	4–3^{12}	**Schmitt** **(1–1)**	Menendez (3–2)	—	808	38–19
May 26	6:00 p.m.	(4) UNLV; Championship	(2)	Tony Gwynn Stadium; San Diego, California	14–5	**Erickson** **(5–3)**	Clark (0–1)	—	1,203	39–19

NCAA tournament – Corvallis Regional
Date	Time	Opponent	Rank	Site stadium	Score	Win	Loss	Save	Attendance	Overall record
June 1	1:00 p.m. ESPNU	(2) LSU; Quarterfinals	(3)	Goss Stadium; Corvallis, Oregon	4–6	Fontenot (3–0)	**Erickson** **(5–4)**	Peterson (6)	3,589	39–20
June 2	1:00 p.m. ESPN3	(4) Northwestern State; Consolation	(3)	Goss Stadium; Corvallis, Oregon	0–9	Maddox (8–3)	**Hill** **(7–3)**	Hodo (3)	3,533	39–21

- Aztecs win
- Aztecs loss
- Bold: Aztecs team member
- Source: San Diego State
- Rankings from Collegiate Baseball.
- (#) Tournament seedings in parentheses.
- All times are in Pacific Time.
