= List of San Diego State Aztecs head baseball coaches =

The San Diego State Aztecs baseball program is a baseball team that represents San Diego State University in the National Collegiate Athletic Association's Mountain West Conference. San Diego State has had eight head coaches since the program began competing in 1926.

== Profiles ==
=== John Hancock ===
John Hancock, who led the team for the 1926 season, is the first recorded coach of San Diego State.

=== Lee Waymire ===
Lee Waymire was San Diego State's second coach, serving for the 1927 season.

=== Harold G. Brucker ===
Harold was the first coach to remain more than one year, coaching the Aztecs in 1928 and 1929.

=== Morris Gross ===
After failing to field a team in 1930, Morris Gross coached the Aztecs in 1931 and 1932.

=== Charles R. Smith ===
After again failing to field a team in 1933, 1934, and 1935, Charles R. Smith took the program over, becoming the first San Diego State coach with an extended tenure. Smith coached the Aztecs from 1936 through 1964, with a three-year interruption from 1943 to 1945 during which time no team was fielded.

=== Lyle Olsen ===
Lyle Olsen succeeded Smith, coaching the Aztecs from 1965 through 1971.

=== Jim Dietz ===
Jim Dietz coached the Aztecs for 31 years, from 1972 through 2002. His record of 1230–751–18 makes him one of the winningest college baseball coaches of all time. Dietz coached a number of players who went on to successful Major League Baseball careers, including Bud Black and Tony Gwynn. He took the position at San Diego State in 1971 a week after accepting and then turning down an offer to coach basketball at Lewis–Clark Normal School—now Lewis–Clark State College.

=== Tony Gwynn ===
A native of Long Beach, California, and an alumnus of San Diego State, Tony Gwynn returned to coach his alma mater after the end of his 20-year Hall of Fame career. Gwynn was hired in the fall of 2001 to replace Dietz following the 2002 season.

The Aztecs' home field was renamed Tony Gwynn Stadium in his honor in 1997.

=== Mark Martinez ===
Mark Martinez took over as head coach after Tony Gwynn died from cancer in 2014.

=== Kevin Vance ===
Kevin Vance has been the head coach since June 17, 2025.

== Notes ==
- "2011 San Diego State Baseball Media Guide". San Diego State University. February 14, 2011. pp. 62–63.
- "Archived Team-By-Team Final Statistics". National Collegiate Athletic Association.
