= 2018 Mountain West Conference baseball tournament =

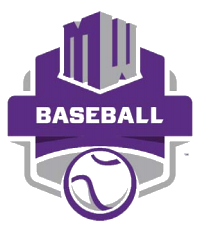
- Teams: 4
- Format: Double-elimination
- Finals site: Tony Gwynn Stadium; San Diego, California
- Champions: San Diego State (5th title)
- Winning coach: Mark Martinez (3rd title)
- MVP: Casey Schmitt (San Diego State)
- Attendance: 2,837
- Television: MW Network

2018 Mountain West Conference baseball standings
	Conf.						Overall
Team	W		L		T	PCT	W		L		T	PCT
Nevada ‍‍‍	20	–	9	–	0	.690	29	–	22	–	0	.569
San Diego State ‍‍‍	18	–	12	–	0	.600	36	–	19	–	0	.655
San Jose State ‍‍‍	16	–	14	–	0	.533	26	–	28	–	0	.481
UNLV ‍‍‍	14	–	16	–	0	.467	33	–	22	–	0	.600
Fresno State ‍‍‍	13	–	17	–	0	.433	30	–	24	–	0	.556
Air Force ‍‍‍	12	–	17	–	0	.414	24	–	30	–	0	.444
New Mexico ‍‍‍	11	–	19	–	0	.367	19	–	33	–	1	.368
As of May 20, 2018; Rankings from Collegiate Baseball

The 2018 Mountain West Conference baseball tournament took place from May 24 through 27. Nevada, San Diego State, San José State, and UNLV met in the double-elimination tournament held at Tony Gwynn Stadium in San Diego, California. San Diego State earned the Mountain West Conference's automatic bid to the 2018 NCAA Division I baseball tournament.

== Format and seeding ==
The conference's top four teams will be seeded based on winning percentage during the round robin regular season schedule. They will then play a double-elimination tournament with the top seed playing the fourth seeded team and the second seeded team playing the third seed.

Team	W	L	T	Pct.	Seed	Tiebreaker
Nevada	20	9		.690	1	
San Diego State	18	12		.600	2	
San Jose State	16	14		.533	3	
UNLV	14	16		.467	4	
Fresno State	13	17		.433		
Air Force	12	17		.414		
New Mexico	11	19		.367		

== Bracket ==
Quarterfinals; Thursday, May 24; MWN
1	Nevada	8
4	UNLV	13
2	San Diego State	2
3	San José State	1
Lower round 1
1	Nevada	6
3	San José State	13

Semifinals; Friday, May 25; MWN
4	UNLV	3
2	San Diego State	4^{12}
Lower final
4	UNLV	9
3	San José State	2

Championship; Saturday, May 26; MWN
2	San Diego State
4	UNLV

== Schedule ==
Game	Time*	Matchup^{#}	Television	Attendance
Quarterfinals – Thursday, May 24
1	1:30 p.m.	No. 1 Nevada vs. No. 4 UNLV	MW Network	826
2	6:00 p.m.	No. 3 San José State at No. 2 San Diego State	MW Network	826
Consolation – Friday, May 25
3	1:30 p.m.	No. 1 Nevada vs. No. 3 San José State	MW Network	808
Semifinals – Friday, May 25
4	6:00 p.m.	No. 4 UNLV at No. 2 San Diego State	MW Network	808
Consolation – Saturday, May 26
5	1:30 p.m.	No. 3 San José State vs. No. 4 UNLV	MW Network	1,203
Championship – Saturday, May 26
6	6:00 p.m.	No. 4 UNLV at No. 2 San Diego State	MW Network	1,203
*Game times in PDT. # – Rankings denote tournament seed.
