= 2018 San Jose State Spartans baseball team =

American college baseball season

2018 San Jose State Spartans baseball
- Conference: Mountain West Conference
- Record: 27–30 (16–14 MW)
- Head coach: Brad Sanfilippo (1st season)
- Hitting coach: Clay Cederquist (1st season)
- Pitching coach: Tyler LaTorre (1st season)
- Home stadium: San Jose Municipal Stadium (Capacity: 4,200)

2018 Mountain West Conference baseball standings
	Conf.						Overall
Team	W		L		T	PCT	W		L		T	PCT
Nevada ‍‍‍	20	–	9	–	0	.690	29	–	22	–	0	.569
San Diego State ‍‍‍	18	–	12	–	0	.600	36	–	19	–	0	.655
San Jose State ‍‍‍	16	–	14	–	0	.533	26	–	28	–	0	.481
UNLV ‍‍‍	14	–	16	–	0	.467	33	–	22	–	0	.600
Fresno State ‍‍‍	13	–	17	–	0	.433	30	–	24	–	0	.556
Air Force ‍‍‍	12	–	17	–	0	.414	24	–	30	–	0	.444
New Mexico ‍‍‍	11	–	19	–	0	.367	19	–	33	–	1	.368
As of May 20, 2018; Rankings from Collegiate Baseball

The 2018 San Jose State Spartans baseball team represented San José State University in the 2018 NCAA Division I baseball season as a member of the Mountain West Conference. The team was coached by Brad Sanfilippo and played their home games at San Jose Municipal Stadium.

== Previous season ==
The Spartans finished 19–35–1 overall, and 10–18–1 in the conference. San José State had two Spartans drafted in the 2017 Major League Baseball draft, who were Josh Nashed for the Cleveland Indians in the 19th round and Matt Brown for the San Francisco Giants in the 27th round. This was the first Major League Baseball draft San José State experienced since the 2013 Major League Baseball draft, which took place in the 2012–13 school year.

== Roster ==
2018 San Jose State Spartans baseball team
Players
Coaches

#	Pos.	Name	B/T	Height	Weight	Year	Previous school	Home town
1	OF	Brett Bautista	L/L	6 ft 0 in (1.83 m)	195 lb (88 kg)	Sr	Granite Bay High School	Granite Bay, California
2	INF	Kent Burckle	L/R	5 ft 8 in (1.73 m)	160 lb (73 kg)	Jr	Saddleback College	San Clemente, California
3	INF	David Campbell	L/R	6 ft 3 in (1.91 m)	205 lb (93 kg)	Sr	Colfax High School	Colfax, California
4	OF	Kellen Strahm	R/R	6 ft 1 in (1.85 m)	200 lb (91 kg)	So	Lane Community College	Eugene, Oregon
6	OF	Chris Williams	L/L	6 ft 0 in (1.83 m)	205 lb (93 kg)	Sr	San Joaquin Delta College	Antioch, California
7	LHP	Zach Wallace	L/L	5 ft 9 in (1.75 m)	170 lb (77 kg)	Jr	Washington High School	Fremont, California
9	C	Johnny Mendoza	R/R	5 ft 7 in (1.7 m)	190 lb (86 kg)	So	Saint Francis High School	Sunnyvale, California
10	RHP	Frank Scalzo, Jr.	–/–	6 ft 3 in (1.91 m)	185 lb (84 kg)	Fr	Vista High School	Vista, California
11	INF	Aaron Pleschner	R/R	6 ft 0 in (1.83 m)	185 lb (84 kg)	Jr	Carlmont High School	Redwood City, California
12	LHP	Wesley Clawson	–/–	6 ft 1 in (1.85 m)	205 lb (93 kg)	Fr	Red Bluff High School	Red Bluff, California
13	INF	Sawyer Pittman	–/–	5 ft 8 in (1.73 m)	165 lb (75 kg)	Jr	Reedley College	Sanger, California
14	C	Samuel Olsson	–/–	6 ft 1 in (1.85 m)	213 lb (97 kg)	Fr	Sheldon High School	Eugene, Oregon
15	OF	Jack Colette	–/–	6 ft 0 in (1.83 m)	190 lb (86 kg)	Fr	St. John Bosco High School	Torrance, California
16	RHP	Tevin Cadola	–/–	6 ft 2 in (1.88 m)	180 lb (82 kg)	Jr	Butte College	Yreka, California
17	INF	Jason Dumont	–/–	5 ft 11 in (1.8 m)	190 lb (86 kg)	Fr	Sunset High School	Portland, Oregon
19	RHP	Fineas Del Bonta-Smith	–/–	6 ft 0 in (1.83 m)	190 lb (86 kg)	Jr	San Joaquin Delta College	Soquel, California
20	LHP	Andrew Mitchel	–/–	6 ft 1 in (1.85 m)	195 lb (88 kg)	Jr	Grossmont College	Atwater, California
21	C	Michael Bowes	–/–	5 ft 11 in (1.8 m)	202 lb (92 kg)	Jr	Mission College	Los Altos, California
23	C	Jace Duty	–/–	6 ft 0 in (1.83 m)	195 lb (88 kg)	Jr	Chemeketa Community College	Newport, Oregon
24	INF	Kyle Morrison	R/R	5 ft 11 in (1.8 m)	200 lb (91 kg)	Sr	Leigh High School	San Jose, California
25	LHP	Connor Konishi	–/–	6 ft 1 in (1.85 m)	195 lb (88 kg)	Fr	Helix Charter High School	San Diego, California
26	INF	Anders Davidson	R/R	6 ft 1 in (1.85 m)	185 lb (84 kg)	So	Walla Walla High School	Walla Walla, Washington
27	RHP	Cameron Keup	R/R	6 ft 2 in (1.88 m)	200 lb (91 kg)	Sr	Cosumnes River College	Elk Grove, California
28	INF	Santiago Cantu	–/–	5 ft 10 in (1.78 m)	168 lb (76 kg)	Fr	Patterson High School	Patterson, California
30	RHP	Travis Sanders	–/–	5 ft 11 in (1.8 m)	180 lb (82 kg)	Jr	Linn–Benton Community College	Hood River, Oregon
31	LHP	Brandon Ross	–/–	6 ft 0 in (1.83 m)	190 lb (86 kg)	Fr	Vista Murrieta High School	Murrieta, California
32	RHP	Josh Goldberg	R/R	5 ft 11 in (1.8 m)	200 lb (91 kg)	Sr	Woodrow Wilson Classical High School	Long Beach, California
33	RHP	Nicholas Morales	–/–	6 ft 2 in (1.88 m)	225 lb (102 kg)	Fr	St. John Bosco High School	Downey, California
34	RHP	Jake Swiech	R/R	6 ft 3 in (1.91 m)	210 lb (95 kg)	Sr	Paraclete High School	Lancaster, California
35	C	Shane Timmons	R/R	5 ft 11 in (1.8 m)	230 lb (104 kg)	Sr	Capistrano Valley High School	Mission Viejo, California
38	RHP	Josh Zanger	R/R	6 ft 0 in (1.83 m)	185 lb (84 kg)	So	Palma School	Gilroy, California
39	RHP	Walter Brinkman	–/–	6 ft 0 in (1.83 m)	170 lb (77 kg)	Fr	Heritage High School	Brentwood, California
40	OF	Hayden Houser	–/–	5 ft 9 in (1.75 m)	190 lb (86 kg)	Fr	Flower Mound High School	Flower Mound, Texas
41	RHP	Justin Watland	–/–	6 ft 4 in (1.93 m)	205 lb (93 kg)	Jr	Feather River College	Reno, Nevada
44	INF	Ruben Ibarra	–/–	6 ft 5 in (1.96 m)	285 lb (129 kg)	Fr	Saint Francis Central Coast Catholic High School	Watsonville, California

Head coach

Brad Sanfilippo UC Davis

Assistant coach(es)

Michael Breen San José State

Hitting coach(es)

Clay Cederquist Sacramento State

Pitching coach(es)

Tyler LaTorre UC Davis

Legend

- (C) Team captain
- (S) Suspended
- (I) Ineligible
- Injured
- Current redshirt

Roster
Last update: February 16, 2018

== Schedule ==
2018 San Jose State Spartans baseball season game log
Regular season

February
Date	Time	Opponent	Site Stadium	Score	Win	Loss	Save	Attendance	Overall record	MW record
February 16	6:00 p.m.	Northern Colorado	San Jose Municipal Stadium; San Jose, CA	7–4	**Keup** **(1–0)**	Watson (0–1)	**Goldberg** **(1)**	615	1–0	0–0
February 17	12:00 p.m.	Northern Colorado	San Jose Municipal Stadium; San Jose, CA	7–12	Lum (1–0)	**Del Bonta** **(0-1)**	—	556	1–1	0–0
February 17	3:30 p.m.	Northern Colorado	San Jose Municipal Stadium; San Jose, CA	11–10	**Brinkman** **(1–0)**	Leedhol (0–1)	**Cadola** **(1)**	556	2–1	0–0
February 18	12:00 p.m.	Northern Colorado	San Jose Municipal Stadium; San Jose, CA	5–6	Maher (1–0)	**Clawson** **(0–1)**	Leedholm (1)	406	2–2	0–0
February 20	5:00 p.m.	Santa Clara	San Jose Municipal Stadium; San Jose, CA	1–4	Martin (1–0)	**Ross** **(0–1)**	Murfee (1)	325	2–3	0–0
February 24	11:00 a.m.	San Francisco	Benedetti Diamond; San Francisco, CA	0–10	Ornido (1–0)	**Swiech** **(0–1)**	—	178	2–4	0–0
February 25	11:00 a.m.	Sacramento State	Benedetti Diamond; San Francisco, CA	5–4	**Goldberg** **(1–0)**	Dentoni (0–1)	**Cadola (2)**	161	3–4	0–0
February 25	3:00 p.m.	San Francisco	Benedetti Diamond; San Francisco, CA	6–1	**Morales** **(1–0)**	Steele (0–1)	**Clawson (1)**	217	4–4	0–0
February 27	5:00 p.m.	Cal Poly	San Jose Municipal Stadium; San Jose, CA	7–4	**Mitchel** **(1–0)**	Redmond (0–2)	**Clawson (2)**	334	5–4	0–0

March
Date	Time	Opponent	Site Stadium	Score	Win	Loss	Save	Attendance	Overall record	MW record
March 4	11:00 a.m.	San Diego State	San Jose Municipal Stadium; San Jose, CA	2–7	Pyatt (1–0)	**Morales** **(1–1)**	—	361	5–5	0–1
March 4	2:00 p.m.	San Diego State	San Jose Municipal Stadium; San Jose, CA	1–11	Hill (2–0)	**Ross** **(0–2)**	—	361	5–6	0–2
March 5	1:00 p.m.	Utah	San Jose Municipal Stadium; San Jose, CA	9–6	**Keup** **(2–0)**	Lapiana (0–1)	**Clawson (3)**	296	6–6	0–2
March 9	1:00 p.m.	Nevada	William Peccole Park; Reno, NV	4–11	Nowaczewski (2–1)	**Goldberg** **(1–1)**	—	767	6–7	0–3
March 10	1:00 p.m.	Nevada	William Peccole Park; Reno, NV	9–10	Anderson (1–1)	**Cadola** **(0–1)**	—	892	6–8	0–4
March 11	12:00 p.m.	Nevada	William Peccole Park; Reno, NV	4–14	Jackson (3–0)	**Morales** **(1–2)**	—	874	6–9	0–5
—	—	Pacific	—							
March 17	4:00 p.m.	Fresno State; Rivalry	San Jose Municipal Stadium; San Jose, CA	4–1	**Goldberg** **(2–1)**	Gonzalez (3–1)	—	444	7–9	1–5
March 18	12:00 p.m.	Fresno State; Rivalry	San Jose Municipal Stadium; San Jose, CA	10–1	**Mitchel** **(2–0)**	Jensen (0–2)	**Del Bonta** **(1)**	524	8–9	2–5
March 18	3:00 p.m.	Fresno State; Rivalry	San Jose Municipal Stadium; San Jose, CA	3–6	Arias (2–0)	**Morales** **(1–3)**	Mitchell (1)	524	8–10	2–6
March 19	3:00 p.m.	Dartmouth	San Jose Municipal Stadium; San Jose, CA	4–3	**Zanger** **(1–0)**	Michel (0–1)	**Clawson (4)**	75	9–10	2–6
March 23	3:00 p.m.	UC Santa Barbara	Caesar Uyesaka Stadium; Santa Barbara, CA	2–9	Dashwood (1–3)	**Goldberg** **(2–2)**	—	300	9–11	2–6
March 24	2:00 p.m.	UC Santa Barbara	Caesar Uyesaka Stadium; Santa Barbara, CA	3–4	Barry (1–0)	**Del Bonta** **(0–2)**	—	400	9–12	2–6
March 25	1:00 p.m.	UC Santa Barbara	Caesar Uyesaka Stadium; Santa Barbara, CA	1–11	Ledesman (1–1)	**Morales** **(1–4)**	—	350	9–13	2–6
March 27	5:00 p.m.	Saint Mary's	San Jose Municipal Stadium; San Jose, CA	2–5	Madrigal (1–0)	**Zanger** **(1–2)**	Hobbs (6)	141	9–14	2–6
March 29	12:00 p.m.	Air Force	Falcon Baseball Field; Colorado Springs, CO	4–5	Biancalana (2–1)	**Goldberg** **(2–3)**	Gilbert (1)	226	9–15	2–7
March 30	12:00 p.m.	Air Force	Falcon Baseball Field; Colorado Springs, CO	3–1	**Mitchel** **(3–0)**	Hargreaves (1–4)	**Del Bonta** **(2)**	314	10–15	3–7
March 31	11:00 a.m.	Air Force	Falcon Baseball Field; Colorado Springs, CO	3–19	Mortenson (1–4)	**Zanger** (1–2)	—	309	10–16	3–8

April
Date	Time	Opponent	Site Stadium	Score	Win	Loss	Save	Attendance	Overall record	MW record
April 3	2:30 p.m.	UC Davis	Dobbins Baseball Complex; Davis, CA	3–7	Hannah (1–3)	**Cadola** **(0–2)**	—	231	10–17	3–8
April 7	4:00 p.m.	Nevada	San Jose Municipal Stadium; San Jose, CA	9–10	Jackson (3–1)	**Del Bonta** **(0–3)**	Cabinian (5)	338	10–18	3–9
April 8	12:00 p.m.	Nevada	San Jose Municipal Stadium; San Jose, CA	4–5	Cabinian (1–1)	**Wallace** **(0–1)**	Ford (1)	390	10–19	3–10
April 8	3:00 p.m.	Nevada	San Jose Municipal Stadium; San Jose, CA	6–3	**Cadola** **(1–2)**	Gomez (2–2)	**Clawson (5)**	390	11–19	4–10
April 10	6:00 p.m.	Santa Clara	Stephen Schott Stadium; Santa Clara, CA	9–3	**Swiech** **(1–1)**	Erlandson (3–1)	—	449	12–19	4–10
April 13	6:05 p.m.	Fresno State; Rivalry	Pete Beiden Field; Fresno, CA	7–11	Jensen (2–3)	**Goldberg** **(2–4)**	—	1,996	12–20	4–11
April 14	6:05 p.m.	Fresno State; Rivalry	Pete Beiden Field; Fresno, CA	15–7	**Mitchel** **(4–0)**	Gonzalez (5–2)	—	1,642	13–20	5–11
April 15	1:05 p.m.	Fresno State; Rivalry	Pete Beiden Field; Fresno, CA	10–7	**Del Bonta** **(1–3)**	Mitchell (3–2)	—	1,713	14–20	6–11
April 17	5:00 p.m.	San Francisco	San Jose Municipal Stadium; San Jose, CA	1–7	Goodman (1–0)	**Swiech** **(1–2)**	—	294	14–21	6–11
April 20	6:00 p.m.	UC Riverside	Riverside Sports Complex; Riverside, CA	7–8	Toplikar (3–2)	**Goldberg** **(2–5)**	Quijada (2)	155	14–22	6–11
April 21	6:00 p.m.	UC Riverside	Riverside Sports Complex; Riverside, CA	5–3	**Del Bonta** **(2–3)**	Webb (0–1)	—	225	15–22	6–11
April 22	1:00 p.m.	UC Riverside	Riverside Sports Complex; Riverside, CA	14–3	**Sweich** **(2–2)**	Morton (2–2)	—	243	16–22	6–11
April 27	6:00 p.m.	New Mexico	San Jose Municipal Stadium; San Jose, CA	6–5	**Del Bonta** **(3–3)**	Emond (3–2)	—	372	17–22	7–11
April 28	3:00 p.m.	New Mexico	San Jose Municipal Stadium; San Jose, CA	5–3	**Mitchel** **(5–0)**	Dye (3–6)	**Del Bonta (3)**	351	18–22	8–11
April 29	12:00 p.m.	New Mexico	San Jose Municipal Stadium; San Jose, CA	3–2	**Clawson** **(1–1)**	Tripp (1–2)	—	361	19–22	9–11

May
Date	Time	Opponent	Site Stadium	Score	Win	Loss	Save	Attendance	Overall record	MW record
May 1	6:00 p.m.	Pacific	Klein Family Field; Stockton, CA	5–10	Sewany (1–5)	**Wallace** **(0–2)**	—	201	19–23	9–11
May 4	6:05 p.m.	UNLV	Earl Wilson Stadium; Paradise, NV	2–11	Strong (7–2)	**Swiech** **(2–3)**	—	476	19–24	9–12
May 5	2:05 p.m.	UNLV	Earl Wilson Stadium; Paradise, NV	8–5	**Mitchel** **(6–0)**	Horn (3–5)	—	486	20–24	10–12
May 6	1:05 p.m.	UNLV	Earl Wilson Stadium; Paradise, NV	10–8	**Cadola** **(2–2)**	Maddux (3–6)	—	406	21–24	11–12
May 9	6:00 p.m.	Cal Poly	Robin Baggett Stadium; San Luis Obispo, CA	3–5	Smith (1–2)	**Goldberg** **(2–6)**	—	1,539	21–25	11–12
May 11	6:00 p.m.	San Diego State	Tony Gwynn Stadium; San Diego, CA	3–2	**Sweich** **(3–3)**	Pyatt (4–3)	**Del Bonta (4)**	451	22–25	12–12
May 12	2:00 p.m.	San Diego State	Tony Gwynn Stadium; San Diego, CA	1–2	Goossen (5–2)	**Mitchel** **(6–1)**	—	331	22–26	12–13
May 12	6:00 p.m.	San Diego State	Tony Gwynn Stadium; San Diego, CA	4–16	Hill (7–2)	**Goldberg** **(2–7)**	—	791	22–27	12–14
May 13	1:00 p.m.	San Diego State	Tony Gwynn Stadium; San Diego, CA	6–4	**Del Bonta** **(4–3)**	Erickson (3–3)	**Clawson (6)**	489	23–27	13–14
May 15	3:00 p.m.	Saint Mary's	Louis Guisto Field; Moraga, CA	3–7	Hobbs (3–3)	**Zanger** **(1–3)**	Schneider (1)	127	23–28	13–14
May 17	7:00 p.m.	Air Force	San Jose Municipal Stadium; San Jose, CA	3–1	**Sweich** **(4–3)**	Nichols (0–3)	**Del Bonta (5)**	293	24–28	14–14
May 18	6:00 p.m.	Air Force	San Jose Municipal Stadium; San Jose, CA	6–5	**Del Bonta** **(5–3)**	Holloway (3–5)	—	697	25–28	15–14
May 19	12:00 p.m.	Air Force	San Jose Municipal Stadium; San Jose, CA	3–1	**Wallace** **(1–2)**	Mortenson (4–7)	**Goldberg (2)**	274	26–28	16–14

Postseason

Mountain West Tournament
Date	Time	Opponent	Rank	Site Stadium	Score	Win	Loss	Save	Attendance	Overall record
May 24	6:00 p.m.	(2) San Diego State; Quarterfinals	(3)	Tony Gwynn Stadium; San Diego, CA	1–2	Erickson (4–3)	**Mitchel** **(6–2)**	—	826	26–29
May 25	1:30 p.m.	(1) Nevada; Consolation	(3)	Tony Gwynn Stadium; San Diego, CA	13–6	**Cadola** **(3–2)**	Jackson (8–4)	—	808	27–29
May 26	1:30 p.m.	(4) UNLV; Semifinals	(3)	Tony Gwynn Stadium; San Diego, CA	2–9	Maddux (4–7)	**Swiech** **(4–4)**	—	1,203	27–30

- Spartans win
- Spartans loss
- Postponed
- Bold: Spartans team member
Source: San José State
