= Brad Sanfilippo =

American baseball player and coach

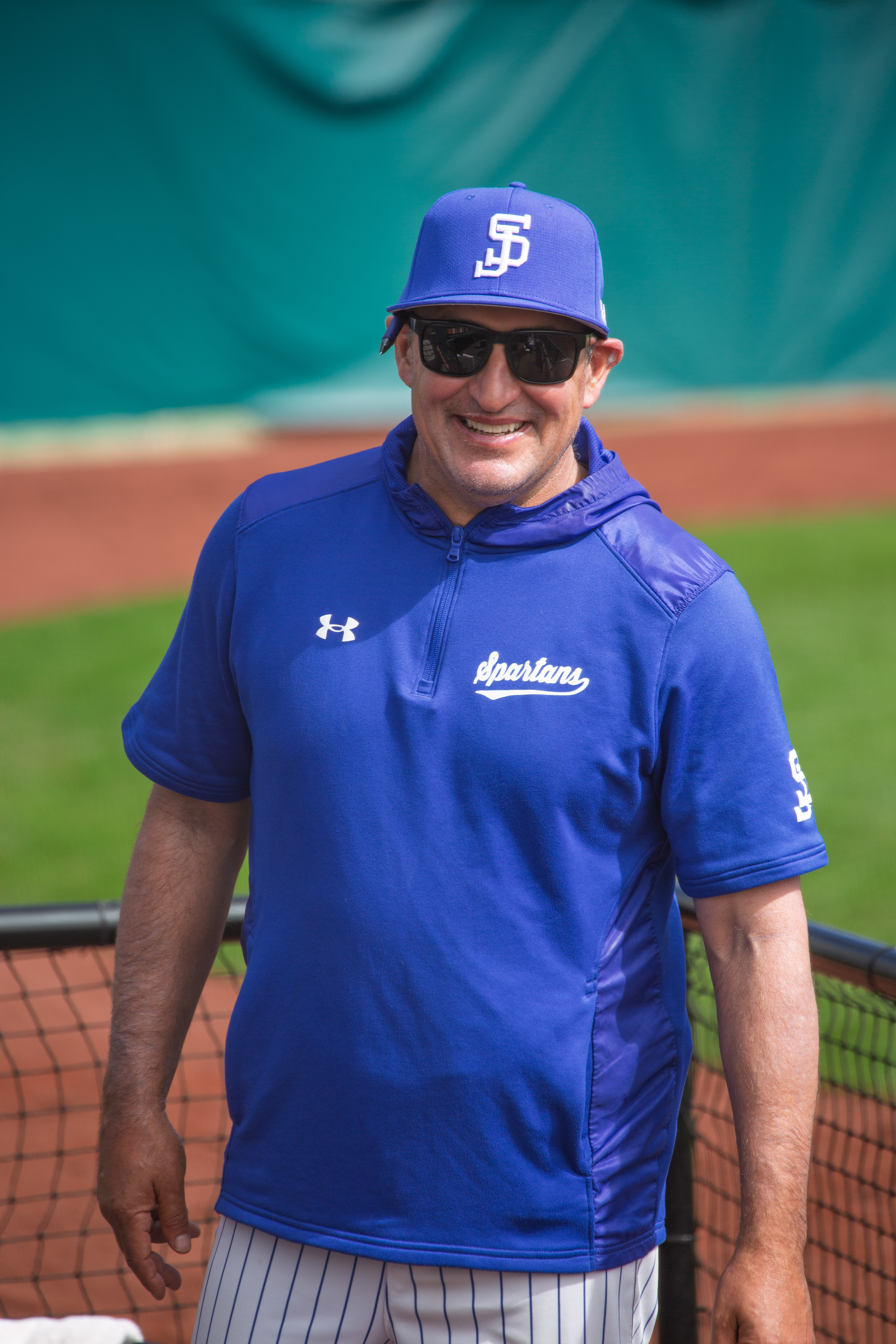
- Sanfilippo at Excite Ballpark in 2026.

Current position
- Title: Head coach
- Team: San Jose State
- Conference: MW
- Record: 196–252 (.438)

Biographical details
- Born: January 3, 1975 (age 51); Los Gatos, California, U.S.

Playing career
- 1995: De Anza
- 1996–1998: UC Davis
- Positions: Outfielder, designated hitter

Coaching career (HC unless noted)
- 1999–2001: Los Gatos HS (asst.)
- 2003: Willow Glen HS
- 2004–2009: Los Gatos HS
- 2010–2012: California (volunteer asst.)
- 2013–2014: San Jose State (asst.)
- 2015–2017: California (asst.)
- 2018–present: San Jose State

Head coaching record
- Overall: 196–252 (.438)
- Tournaments: NCAA: 0–2

Accomplishments and honors

Championships
- MW regular season (2023); MW Tournament (2023)

Awards
- MW Coach of the Year (2023)

Bradley Alfson Sanfilippo (born January 3, 1975) is an American college baseball coach, currently serving as head coach at San Jose State. Sanfilippo played college baseball at De Anza and UC Davis.

Sanfilippo was a high school baseball coach in Los Gatos and San Jose, California before moving up to the college level as a volunteer assistant at California in 2010. From 2013 to 2014, he was an assistant coach at San Jose State, before coming back to California as assistant from 2015 to 2017. After spending the 2018 season as interim head coach at San Jose State, Sanfilippo was promoted to the job long term.

== Playing career ==
A native of Los Gatos, California, Sanfilippo graduated from Los Gatos High School in 1993. An outfielder and designated hitter, Sanfilippo began his college baseball career at De Anza College before transferring to UC Davis before his sophomore year. As a senior at UC Davis in 1998, Sanfilippo was a team captain and batted .308 with 37 hits and 19 RBI.

== Coaching career ==
=== Early coaching career (1999–2017) ===
Sanfilippo returned to Los Gatos High School as an assistant coach in 1999. In 2002, Sanfilippo was director of baseball operations at Santa Clara. In 2003, he was named the head coach at Willow Glen High School. From 2004 to 2009, Sanfilippo served as the head coach of Los Gatos. Sanfilippo also taught eighth grade English at Willow Glen Middle School in San Jose for seven years. In 2009, Sanfilippo served as assistant coach of the Brewster Whitecaps, a collegiate summer baseball team in the Cape Cod Baseball League.

In September 2009, Sanfilippo became a volunteer assistant coach at California. The recruiting coordinator and third base coach under David Esquer, Sanfilippo would remain at California for three seasons, including California's run to the 2011 College World Series.

Under Dave Nakama, Sanfilippo was an assistant coach at San Jose State from 2013 to 2014. He spent a second stint at California as assistant coach from 2015 to 2017.

=== San Jose State head coach (2018–present) ===
In January 2018, Sanfilippo returned to San Jose State as interim head coach, after regular head coach Jason Hawkins was placed on leave before eventually resigning.

After posting a 27–30 record and third-place finish in Mountain West Conference standings at 16–14 in conference, Sanfilippo was promoted from interim head coach with a five-year contract on June 12, 2018. But in September 2018, the National Collegiate Athletic Association placed San Jose State on two years of probation and reduced practice time for the 2018–19 school year after finding that previous head coach Hawkins violated rules about practice time.

The following year in 2019, San Jose State started 12–4 in Mountain West games. But San Jose State won just one of the last 14 conference games, in part due to starting center fielder Kellen Strahm being injured. Then in 2020, San Jose State was 5–12 when the NCAA canceled all sports competition in March that year due to the COVID-19 pandemic. In another season shortened by COVID-19, San Jose State went 6–30, including 2–19 and last place in Mountain West standings.

But in 2022, San Jose State had a much improved season, finishing 30–29 (16–14 and third in MW standings). At the 2022 Mountain West Tournament, San Jose State finished as runners-up to Air Force. Following the season, San Jose State extended Sanfilippo's contract two years through 2025.

San Jose State baseball advanced even further in 2023, finishing 18–11 in Mountain West play with the regular season co-championship, the first conference title for San Jose State since the 2009 Western Athletic Conference regular season title. Sanfilippo and San Diego State head coach Mark Martinez were both named Coaches of the Year by the Mountain West. At the 2023 Mountain West Tournament, San Jose State defeated Air Force 12–9 in the championship game on May 28 to win the tournament title and qualify for the NCAA tournament for the first time since 2002. This win elevated San Jose State to a 31–25 record, marking back-to-back seasons with 30 or more wins for the first time since 2008 and 2009. San Jose State finished 31–27 after losing both games at the NCAA Stanford Regional. Following the season, second baseman Charles McAdoo was selected in the 2023 MLB draft by the Pittsburgh Pirates in the 13th round.

In 2024, San Jose State went 24–33 overall but 16–14 in Mountain West games, the third straight season with a winning conference record. San Jose State also qualified for the final round of the Mountain West Tournament for the third straight season, but San Jose State was unable to defend the 2023 tournament championship, losing twice to rival Fresno State to end the season.

San Jose State had slightly more overall wins at 29–30 in 2025 but finished sixth in the MW standings at 13–17 in conference. For the fourth straight year, San Jose State advanced to the championship round of the Mountain West Tournament, but the season ended with a second straight championship loss to Fresno State.

== Head coaching record ==
Record table
Season	Team	Overall	Conference	Standing	Postseason
San Jose State Spartans (Mountain West Conference) (2018–present)
2018	San Jose State	27–30	16–14	3rd	
2019	San Jose State	20–34	13–17	6th	
2020	San Jose State	5–12	0–0		Season canceled due to COVID-19
2021	San Jose State	6–30	2–19	7th	
2022	San Jose State	30–29	16–14	3rd	
2023	San Jose State	31–27	18–11	T–1st	NCAA regional
2024	San Jose State	24–33	16–14	T–3rd	
2025	San Jose State	29–30	13–17	6th	
2026	San Jose State	24–27	11–13	7th	
San Jose State:		196–252 (.438)	105–119 (.469)		
Total:		196–252 (.438)			
National champion Postseason invitational champion Conference regular season champion Conference regular season and conference tournament champion Division regular season champion Division regular season and conference tournament champion Conference tournament champion

== See also ==
- List of current NCAA Division I baseball coaches
