= Florida Complex League Astros =

- (1965, 1977–1998, 2009–present); West Palm Beach, Florida

Team logo	Cap insignia

Minor league affiliations
- Class: Rookie
- League: Florida Complex League
- Division: East Division
- Previous leagues: Gulf Coast League (1977–1998, 2009–2020); Florida Rookie League (1965)

Major league affiliations
- Team: Houston Astros

Minor league titles
- League titles (4): 1965; 1979; 1994; 2026
- Division titles (3): 1993; 1994; 2026

Team data
- Name: FCL Astros
- Previous names: GCL Astros (1982–1998, 2009–2020); GCL Astros Blue & Orange (1980–1981); GCL Astros (1977–1979); FRL Astros (1965)
- Ballpark: FITTEAM Ballpark of the Palm Beaches (2017–present)
- Previous parks: Osceola County Stadium (2009–2016)
- Owner/ Operator: Houston Astros

The Florida Complex League Astros are a Rookie-level affiliate of the Houston Astros, competing in the Florida Complex League of Minor League Baseball. Prior to the 2021 season, the team was known as the Gulf Coast League Astros. The team plays its home games in West Palm Beach, Florida, at the FITTEAM Ballpark of the Palm Beaches. The team is composed mainly of players who are in their first year of professional baseball either as draftees or non-drafted free agents from the United States, Canada, Dominican Republic, Venezuela, and other countries.

== History ==
The team first played in 1965 in the Florida Rookie League (FRL), and won the league championship. The FRL was the direct predecessor of the Gulf Coast League (GCL), which was formed in 1966. However, the team first played in the GCL during 1977–1998, capturing titles in 1979 and 1994. In 1980 and 1981, the team fielded two squads in the GCL, differentiated by Orange and Blue suffixes. The team suspended operations after the 1998 season.

The team returned to the GCL in 2009, playing their home games at Osceola County Stadium in Kissimmee, Florida. The team has operated continuously since then, and moved to West Palm Beach entering the 2017 season.

Prior to the 2021 season, the Gulf Coast League was renamed as the Florida Complex League (FCL).

== Rosters ==
Florida Complex League Astros roster
Players	Coaches/Other
Pitchers: 9 Luis Amador; 41 Adrian Ardines; 28 Jhoster Baez; -- Tazwell Butler ∞; -- Bryan Carney ∞; 51 Andrew Dunford; 54 Michael Knorr #; 44 Andrew Marrero; 53 Sandy Mejia #; 38 Juan Mieses; 43 Juan Nunez #; 20 Ismael Obregon; 35 Alain Pena; 21 Angel Peralta; 54 Ryan Petrovitch; 94 Jank Pichardo; -- Jack Radel ∞; 37 Jose Serrano; 39 Bennett Sousa * #; 57 Kai-Wei Teng #; 46 Jose Varela; Catchers: 6 August Cuneo; 31 Luis De Leon; 18 Jase Mitchell; 19 Alexi Quiroz; -- John Rodriguez; Infielders: 1 Anderson Areinamo; 11 Landon Arroyos; 45 Narbe Cruz #; 28 Camilo Diaz #; 62 Brandon Forrester #; 17 Curtis Hebert #; 3 Alberto Hernandez #; 63 Pablo Martinez; 26 Nick Monistere #; 2 Sandro Pereira; -- Aaron Piasecki ∞; 22 Juan Rojas; 28 Braden Shewmake; Outfielders: -- Bryce Boettcher ‡; 8 Elijah Farley; -- Logan Hughes ∞; 30 Ariel Lebron; -- Ryan Pruitt ∞; 10 Luis Quesada; 12 Roiner Quintana; 17 Luis Rives; 23 Edwin Sanchez; 15 Ethan Wagner	Manager: -- Vincent Blue; Coaches: -- Alejandro Martinez (development); -- Luis Alfredo Ramirez (pitching); -- Rene Rojas (hitting); -- Brandon Van Horn (hitting); 60-day injured list: -- Antony Aparicio (hitting); 37 Miguel Balza; -- Porfirio Ramos (hitting); 7-day injured list; * On Houston Astros 40-man roster; ~ Development list; # Rehab assignment; ∞ Reserve list; ‡ Restricted list; § Suspended list; † Temporarily inactive list; Roster updated July 22, 2026; Transactions; → More rosters: MiLB • Florida Complex League; → Houston Astros minor league players

== Season-by-season ==
Year	Record	Finish	Manager	Playoffs
FRL Astros (1965)
1965	36–21	1st	Joe Frazier	League Champs; No playoffs until 1983
GCL Astros (1977–1979)
1977	22–32	6th	Julio Linares	No playoffs until 1983
1978	23–31	5th	Julio Linares	
1979	33–19	1st	Julio Linares	League Champs
GCL Astros Blue (1980–1981)
1980	38–24	2nd	Eric Swanson	
1981	22–38	12th	Eric Swanson	
GCL Astros Orange (1980–1981)
1980	34–28	5th	Fernando Tatis	
1981	33–28	4th	Lyle Olsen	
GCL Astros (1982–1998)
1982	20–42	10th	Jose Tartabull	
1983	29–32	6th	Jose Tartabull	
1984	36–27	2nd (t)	Jose Tartabull	
1985	24–37	8th	Julio Linares	
1986	32–29	3rd	Julio Linares	
1987	32–30	5th	Julio Linares	
1988	28–35	7th	Julio Linares	
1989	16–47	14th	Julio Linares	
1990	33–30	7th	Julio Linares	
1991	27–33	12th (t)	Julio Linares	
1992	27–33	12th	Julio Linares	
1993	35–24	3rd	Julio Linares	Lost League Finals (vs. GCL Rangers (2 games to 0); Won in 1st round (vs. GCL Mets (1 game to 0)
1994	41–18	2nd	Bobby Ramos	League Champs (vs. GCL Royals (2 games to 1); Won in 1st round (vs. GCL Marlins (1 game to 0)
1995	32–26	8th (t)	Bobby Ramos	
1996	31–28	7th	Bobby Ramos	
1997	24–36	14th	Julio Linares	
1998	22–38	14th	Julio Linares	
GCL Astros (2009–2020)
2009	18–38	16th	Omar López	
2010	20–36	15th	Omar López	
2011	20–34	15th	Ed Romero	
2012	28–31	9th	Ed Romero	
2013	27–33	11th (t)	Edgar Alfonzo	
2014	28–32	11th	Marty Malloy	
2015	19–41	15th	Marty Malloy	
2016	22–31	14th	Marty Malloy	
2017	27–27	10th	Wladimir Sutil	
2018	27–28	9th	Wladimir Sutil	
2019	23–28	10th	Wladimir Sutil	Playoffs cancelled due to Hurricane Dorian
2020	No Season due to pandemic			
FCL Astros (2021)
2021	28–28	7th	Ricky Rivera; Wladimir Sutil	
FCL Astros Blue (2022)
2022	15–38	16th	Ricky Rivera	
FCL Astros Orange (2022)
2022	26–28	9th	Carlos Lugo	
FCL Astros (2023–present)
2023	26–25	9th	Carlos Lugo	
2024	25–27	8th	Carlos Lugo	
2025	37–16	1st	Vincent Blue	Lost in 1st round vs. FCL Blue Jays (1 game to 0)
2026	42–11	1st	Vincent Blue	League Champs (vs. FCL Rays (2 games to 0); Won in 1st round (vs. FCL Orioles (1 game to 0)
