= Morris Gross =

Playing career

Basketball
- 1922–1924: San Diego State
- 1926–1927: San Diego State

Coaching career (HC unless noted)

Basketball
- 1929–1942: San Diego State

Baseball
- 1931–1932: San Diego State

Administrative career (AD unless noted)
- 1935–1941: San Diego State

Head coaching record
- Overall: 190–85 (basketball); 10–6–1 (baseball)

Accomplishments and honors

Championships
- Basketball; NAIA (1941)

Morris H. Gross was an American basketball player and coach, baseball coach, and college athletics administrator. He served as the head basketball coach at San Diego State University from 1929 to 1942, compiling a record of 190–85. Smith was also the head baseball coach at San Diego State from 1931 to 1932, tallying a mark of 10–6–1. His 1940–41 basketball squad won the NAIA Men's Basketball Championship. Gross served as an officer in the United States Navy during World War II. In November 1944 he was assigned to coach the Saint Mary's Pre-Flight Air Devils basketball team.
