= Tony Sanchez (American football) =

American football player and coach (born 1974)

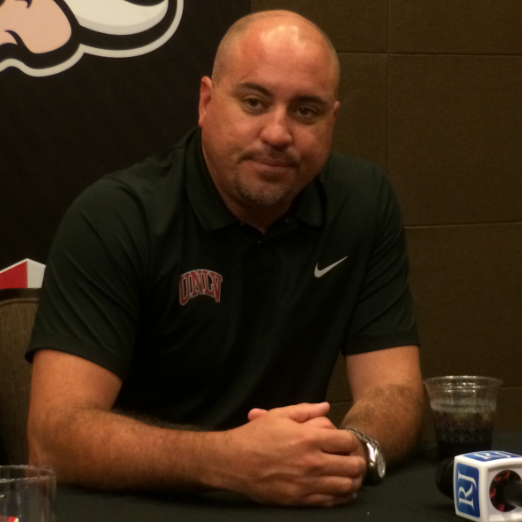
- Sanchez at 2016 Mountain West Media Days

Current position
- Title: Head coach
- Team: New Mexico State
- Conference: C-USA
- Record: 10–25

Biographical details
- Born: January 25, 1974 (age 52); Fairfield, California, U.S.
- Education: New Mexico State University (BS)

Playing career
- 1992–1993: Laney
- 1994–1995: New Mexico State
- Position: Wide receiver

Coaching career (HC unless noted)
- 1996: New Mexico State (SA)
- 1998: Onate HS (NM) (WR)
- 2000: Irvin HS (TX) (WR)
- 2001–2002: Onate HS (NM) (DB)
- 2003: Onate HS (NM) (DC/DB)
- 2004–2008: California HS (CA)
- 2009–2014: Bishop Gorman HS (NV)
- 2015–2019: UNLV
- 2021: TCU (OA)
- 2022–2023: New Mexico State (WR)
- 2024–present: New Mexico State

Head coaching record
- Overall: 30–65 (college); 120–26 (high school)

Accomplishments and honors

Championships
- 6 Nevada 4A state (high school)

Awards
- USA Today Coach of the Year (2014)

Anthony Phillip Sanchez (born January 25, 1974) is an American college football coach and former wide receiver, who is the current head football coach at New Mexico State University, his alma mater. He was the head football coach at the University of Nevada, Las Vegas (UNLV) from 2014 to 2019. Before that, he was the head football coach at Bishop Gorman High School in Las Vegas.

== Early life and college playing career ==
Sanchez was born on Travis Air Force Base in Fairfield, California, where his father was stationed. Sanchez graduated from Granada High School in Livermore, California in 1992 and began his college football career as a wide receiver at Laney College, a junior college in nearby Oakland. In 1994, Sanchez transferred to New Mexico State University, where he played two seasons with the New Mexico State Aggies. Sanchez made 54 receptions for 741 yards and 5 touchdowns in his two seasons at NMSU.

== Coaching career ==
Sanchez began his coaching career in 1996 as an undergraduate assistant at New Mexico State; he would eventually complete his bachelor's degree in family and consumer science at NMSU in 1998. After graduating from NMSU, Sanchez spent the 1998 season as wide receivers coach at Onate High School, like NMSU in Las Cruces, New Mexico. In 2000, Sanchez became wide receivers coach at Irvin High School in El Paso, Texas. Sanchez returned to Onate High in 2001 to be defensive backs coach. In 2003, Sanchez was promoted to be defensive coordinator in addition to defensive backs coach at the school.

In 2004, Sanchez got his first head coaching position at California High School in San Ramon, California. Sanchez turned around California High "from doormat status to a berth in the North Coast Section finals," according to ESPN.

Sanchez became head coach at Bishop Gorman High School in Las Vegas, Nevada in 2009 and would be head coach at the school for six seasons. In his tenure as Gorman head coach, Sanchez achieved an 85–5 record and led Gorman to the Nevada Interscholastic Activities Association 4A championship every season.

On December 16, 2014, the Nevada System of Higher Education Board of Regents voted unanimously to hire Sanchez as head coach at UNLV. He was succeeded at Bishop Gorman by his brother, Kenneth.

Sanchez and UNLV agreed to part ways on November 25, 2019. He coached his final game for the Rebels against Nevada on November 30. He finished with a career record of 20–40.

Sanchez joined the staff at TCU as an offensive analyst in 2021. New head coach Jerry Kill, who had been on the staff with Sanchez at TCU, hired him as wide receivers coach at New Mexico State in 2022. Sanchez succeeded Kill as head coach following the 2023 season.

== Personal life ==
Sanchez is of Puerto Rican and English descent. He is divorced and has two children. The National Catholic Register describes Sanchez as a "devout Catholic".

== Head coaching record ==
=== High school ===
Year	Team	Overall	Conference	Standing	Bowl/playoffs
California Grizzlies (East Bay Athletic League) (2004–2008)
2004	California	4–6	2–4	5th	
2005	California	8–3	4–2	T–2nd	L CIF North Coast Section First Round
2006	California	5–5	2–4	5th	
2007	California	11–2	5–1	T–1st	L CIF North Coast Section Finals
2008	California	7–5	4–3	4th	
California:		35–21	17–14		
Bishop Gorman Gaels (Sunset 4A Region) (2009–2014)
2009	Bishop Gorman	15–0	8–0	1st (Southwest)	W NIAA 4A Championship
2010	Bishop Gorman	13–2	8–0	1st (Southwest)	W NIAA 4A Championship
2011	Bishop Gorman	16–0	7–0	1st (Southwest)	W NIAA 4A Championship
2012	Bishop Gorman	13–1	5–0	1st (Southwest)	W NIAA 4A Championship
2013	Bishop Gorman	13–2	5–0	1st (Southwest)	W NIAA 4A Championship
2014	Bishop Gorman	15–0	4–0	1st (Southwest)	W NIAA 4A Championship
Bishop Gorman:		85–5	37–0		
Total:		120–26			
National championship Conference title Conference division title or championship game berth

=== College ===
Year	Team	Overall	Conference	Standing	Bowl/playoffs
UNLV Rebels (Mountain West Conference) (2015–2019)
2015	UNLV	3–9	2–6	T–4th (West)	
2016	UNLV	4–8	3–5	T–3rd (West)	
2017	UNLV	5–7	4–4	3rd (West)	
2018	UNLV	4–8	2–6	5th (West)	
2019	UNLV	4–8	2–6	T–4th (West)	
UNLV:		20–40	13–27		
New Mexico State Aggies (Conference USA) (2024–present)
2024	New Mexico State	3–9	2–6	T–8th	
2025	New Mexico State	4–8	2–6	T–9th	
2026	New Mexico State	3–8	2–5		
New Mexico State:		10–25	6–17		
Total:		30–65			
