= David Klech =

American decathlete (born 1988)

Personal information
- Nationality: United States
- Born: April 29, 1988 (age 38) Walnut Creek, California, U.S.
- Height: 6 ft 4 in (1.93 m)
- Weight: 170 lb (77 kg)

Sport
- Sport: Track and Field
- Events: Decathlon, Heptathlon (indoor), 400 meter hurdles, High Jump

Achievements and titles
- National finals: 2012 USA Track & Field Indoor Combined Events Championships: 2nd place in Men's Heptathlon, 5809 points,
- Personal bests: Decathlon: 7,581 points Heptathlon: 5,831 points 400 m hurdles: 50.35; 110 meter hurdles: 13.82; High Jump: 2.11m 60 meters: 7.01; 60 meter hurdles: 7.88; 100 meter: 10.88; 400 meter: 48.06; 1000 meter: 2:30.64; Pole Vault: 4.40m Long Jump: 7.51m Triple Jump: 14.16m Shot Put: 11.13m Discus Throw: 35.16m Javelin Throw: 37.70m
Medal record
Men's athletics
Representing the United States
World Youth Championships
Silver medal – second place	2005 Marrakesh	400 m hurdles

David Klech (born April 29, 1988) is an American decathlete. He attended the University of Oregon, after transferring from the University of California, Los Angeles.

== Athletic career ==
=== Prep ===
One of the most dominant high school athletes of his time, Klech was a stand-out in nearly all track & field events. Klech won a bronze medal in a tight finish in the 400 meter hurdles at the 2005 World Youth Championships in Athletics in Marrakesh. That medal was advanced to silver when the winner, Abdulagadir Idriss, was disqualified for doping. Klech was credited with the same time as eventual winner Mohammed Daak.

In 2006, his senior year, Klech represented California High School in San Ramon, California with a national high school leading 300 meter hurdles time of 35.45, set at the Arcadia Invitational, and a 400 meter hurdles time of 50.35 set at the Stanford Invitational. He won the 300 hurdles at the CIF California State Meet, defeating both Jeshua Anderson and Reggie Wyatt, future national record holders. He also long jumped 23 ft 9 1/2 in (7.25 m).

For his record-setting senior year, David Klech was named the 2005–2006 Gatorade High School Track and Field Athlete of the Year.

=== University of California, Los Angeles ===
Klech ran with the UCLA Bruins during his freshman year, 2006–2007. At UCLA, Klech was hampered by injuries. He only competed three times in outdoor track, and none of his marks were close to what he had achieved one year earlier in high school. He was released by UCLA at the end of his freshman year, in June 2007. He then transferred to University of Oregon and sat out (redshirted) the 2007–2008 season.

=== University of Oregon ===
At University of Oregon, Klech primarily competed in the 400 meter hurdles and high jump from 2009–2011.

As a fifth year senior, Klech began competing in the decathlon for the first time. Despite his inexperience, he finished 16th in the decathlon at the 2011 NCAA Men's Division I Outdoor Track & Field Championships and sixth in the heptathlon at the 2011 NCAA Men's Division I Indoor Track and Field Championships. He was named a 2011 Indoor Track & Field All-American in the heptathlon and a 2011 Outdoor Track & Field All-American in the decathlon.

An excellent student, Klech was named a Track & Field All-Academic in 2009, 2010, and 2011. He was also named to the 2011 Capital One Academic All-America Men's Track & Field/Cross Country first team. With a 3.96 GPA, Klech graduated magna cum laude with a bachelor's degree in psychology in 2011. He went on to earn a master's degree in psychology in 2011 and a second master's degree in educational leadership and administration in 2013, both from University of Oregon.

=== Professional ===
After graduating from Oregon, Klech placed second in the heptathlon in the 2012 USATF Indoor Combined Events Championships, with 5,809 points. His performance included setting a meet-record time of 2:30.64 in the 1000 meters.

== Coaching career ==
Klech is currently the head track and field and cross country coach at the University of California, Santa Cruz, where he focuses on sprints, hurdles, jumps, and multis for both men and women. Under his coaching, UCSC has had multiple DIII NCAA Cross Country National Championship team appearances on both the men's and women's sides, as well as multiple individual All-Americans on the track.

Kelch formerly spent three years coaching track and field at Acalanes High School in Lafayette, California. Before that, Klech was a volunteer assistant track and field coach at University of Oregon, where he worked with the men and women on hurdles, multis, high jump, throws, and pole vault.
