= Jim Dietz (baseball) =

American baseball player and coach (1938–2022)

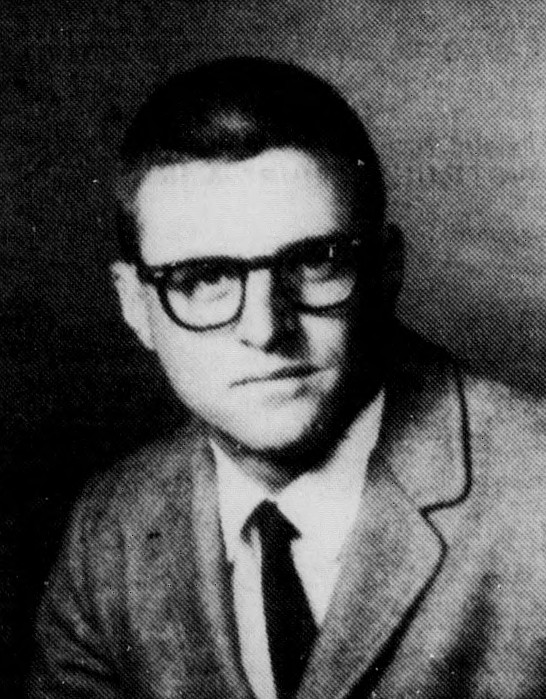
- Dietz, circa 1971

Biographical details
- Born: July 31, 1938; Eugene, Oregon, U.S.
- Died: March 27, 2022 (aged 83); Florence, Oregon, U.S

Playing career

Baseball
- 1961: Jamestown Tigers
- Position: Second baseman

Coaching career (HC unless noted)

Baseball
- 1963–1964: Lowell HS (OR)
- 1965–1968: Pleasant Hill HS (OR)
- 1969–1971: Oregon (JV/freshmen)
- 1972–2002: San Diego State

Basketball
- 1968–1971: Oregon (freshmen)

Head coaching record
- Overall: 1,230–751–18 (college baseball)

James Clyde Dietz (July 31, 1938 – March 27, 2022) was an American college baseball coach and player. He served as the head baseball coach at San Diego State University from 1972 to 2002, compiling a record of 1,230–751–18. After coaching the freshman basketball team and the junior varsity baseball team at the University of Oregon, Dietz was appointed as the head basketball coach at Lewis–Clark Normal School—now Lewis–Clark State College—in May 1971, but turned down that offer a week later to take the head baseball coaching position at San Diego State.

Under Dietz, the Aztecs went to the NCAA Tournament eight times (1979, 1981, 1982, 1983, 1984, 1986, 1990, 1991) while winning the Western Athletic Conference five times (three regular season, two tournaments) and the Mountain West twice (one regular season, one conference).

In the fall of 2001, Dietz announced his retirement from coaching at SDSU, and was replaced by Aztec alum and baseball Hall Of Famer Tony Gwynn following the 2002 season. On April 15, 2011, the Aztecs retired Dietz's jersey number 4.

Dietz died on March 27, 2022, in Florence, Oregon, from complications from Alzheimer's disease and dementia.

== See also ==
- List of college baseball career coaching wins leaders
