= California High School (San Ramon, California) =

Public high school in California, United States

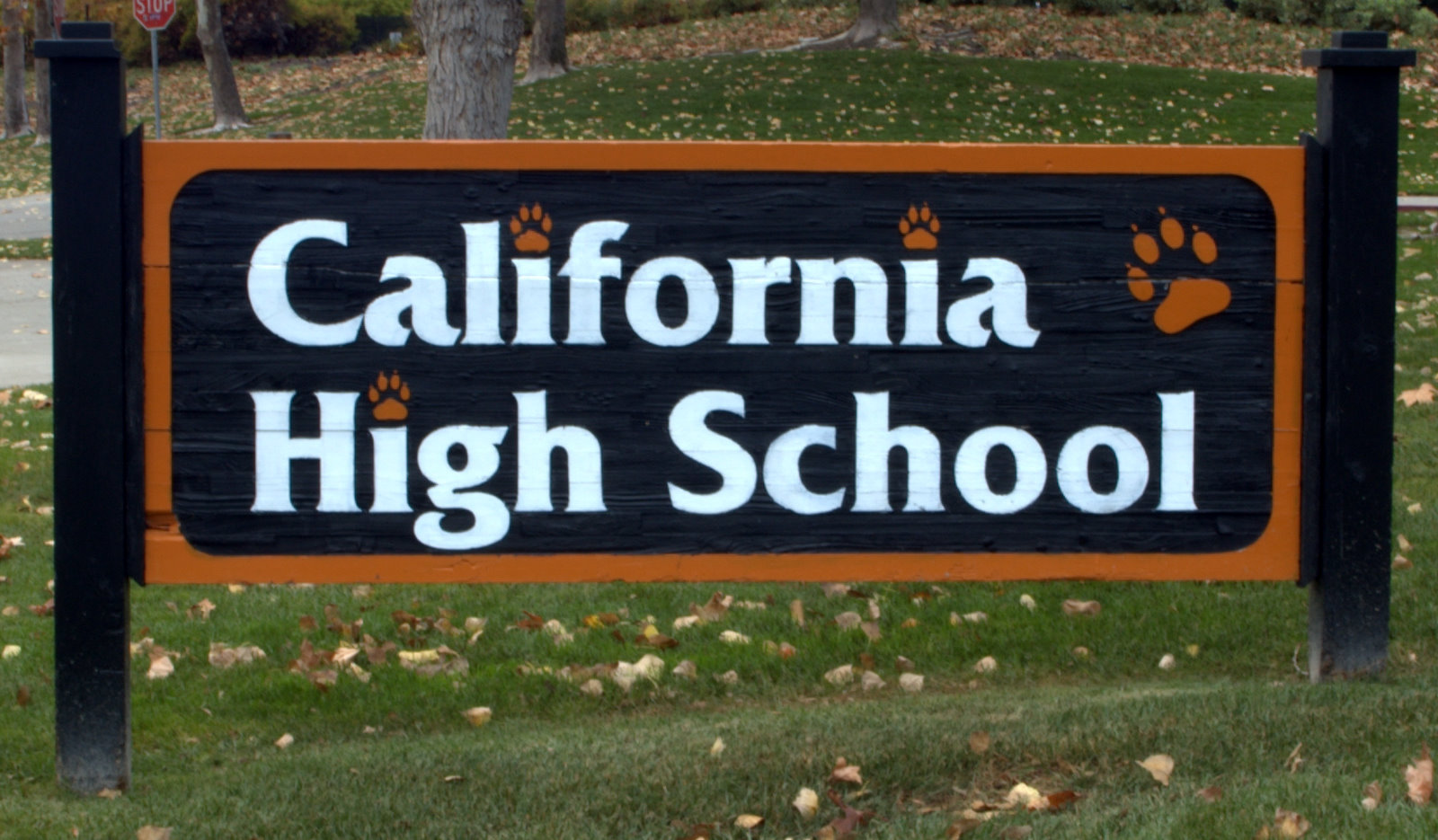

Location
- 9870 Broadmoor Drive; San Ramon, California 94582; United States; 37°44′48″N 121°56′46″W

Information
- Type: Public
- Established: 1973
- CEEB code: 053229
- Principal: Demetrius Ball
- Teaching staff: 111.75 FTEs
- Enrollment: 2,869 (2023–2024)
- Student to teacher ratio: 25.67
- Colors: Black and orange
- Athletics conference: East Bay Athletic League
- Nickname: Cal, Cal High, The Grizzlies
- Team name: The Fighting Grizzlies
- Newspaper: The Californian
- Website: chs.srvusd.net

California High School (commonly referred to as Cal High) is one of two public high schools located in San Ramon, California, United States (Dougherty Valley High School is the other). It is one of four high schools in the San Ramon Valley Unified School District and serves students from the western portion of San Ramon and the unincorporated area of Norris Canyon. Its mascot is the grizzly bear.

As of the 2014–15 school year, the school had an enrollment of 2,639 students and 107.5 classroom teachers (on an FTE basis), for a student–teacher ratio of 24.5:1. There were 78 students (3.0% of enrollment) eligible for free lunch and 39 (1.5% of students) eligible for reduced-cost lunch.

Cal High's athletic rivals are Monte Vista High School and San Ramon Valley High School in Danville, and De La Salle High School in Concord, California.

== Campus ==
Cal has an all-weather track and an aquatic center, including a multi-use athletic stadium and fields (football, soccer, lacrosse, and track and field). Outside, there are six tennis courts, four baseball/softball fields including one baseball field and one softball field intended for games, and an indoor gym and stadium. In 2004, a two-story, ten-classroom building was completed and was designated the World Language building. In 2006, the school added a new main building (67 classrooms on 3 stories) and a new library. In 2007, the school completed a new careers and technology building, student quad, and counseling building. In 2008, the new fine arts building was completed. In March 2010, a second gymnasium was completed on the site of outdoor basketball courts, called the Event Center. In April 2010, a new theater, which was under renovation for three years, opened. It has nine classrooms and is fully fitted with a video production studio and sound room, and an art gallery to display student work. Cal high has a large student and faculty parking area, though demand exceeds available space. In light of this, many of the streets around the school are permit parking zones. Cal High also has a recently renovated weight room, equipped with lifting machines and 12 fully stocked Olympic weightlifting cages used mainly by the football team and weightlifting class. Twelve years of construction were concluded with the installation of SunPower solar panels over the back parking lot in the summer of 2011.

== Awards and recognition ==
During the 2006–07 school year, California High School was recognized with the Blue Ribbon School Award of Excellence by the United States Department of Education, the highest award an American school can receive.

Cal High's student-run monthly newspaper is The Californian. The first school newspaper, The Bear Facts, was started in 1973.

California High School was ranked No. 250 in the top 500 US high schools by Newsweek in 2011, placing it within the top 1.5% of the over 18,000 high schools in the United States. In 2005, Cal High was a California Distinguished School.

== Notable people ==
=== Alumni ===
- David Bingham (2008) – Major League Soccer player for Charlotte FC.
- Colby Buzzell (1995) – Author of multiple books and well-distributed magazine articles
- Chuck Cary (1978) Professional baseball player
- David Klech (2006) American track and field athlete
- Sandy LaBeaux (1978) – professional football player for the Tampa Bay Buccaneers and Houston Gamblers
- Chris Verhulst (1984) – NFL Professional Football Player Houston Oilers (1988–1989), Denver Broncos (1990)
- Andrew Wiedeman (2007) – Former professional soccer player
- Ryan Wright (2018) – NFL Professional Football player, punter

=== Faculty ===
- Tony Sanchez – Head football coach from 2004 to 2008. Went on to coach the Bishop Gorman High School (Nevada) and University of Nevada, Las Vegas football programs. Sanchez turned around California High "from doormat status to a berth in the North Coast Section finals," according to ESPN.

== Gallery ==
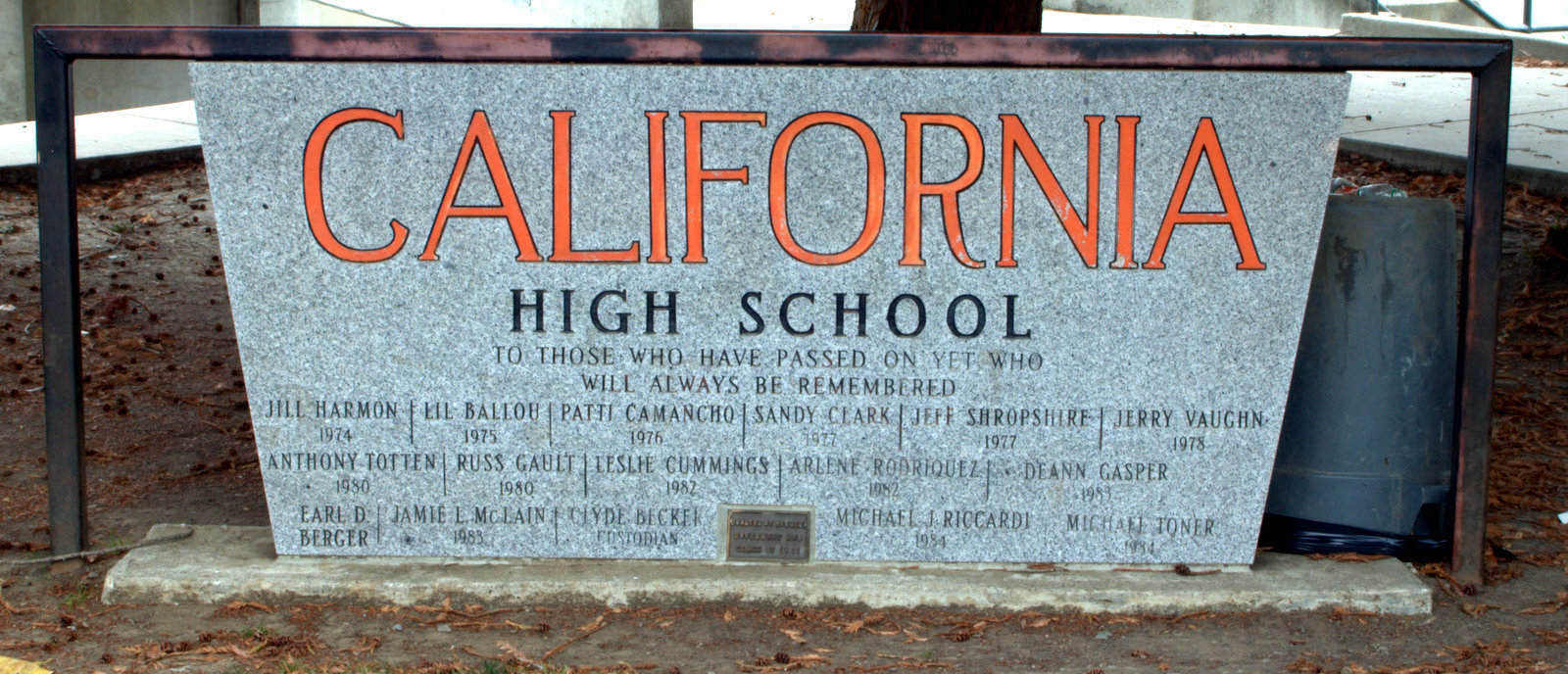
Memorial sign

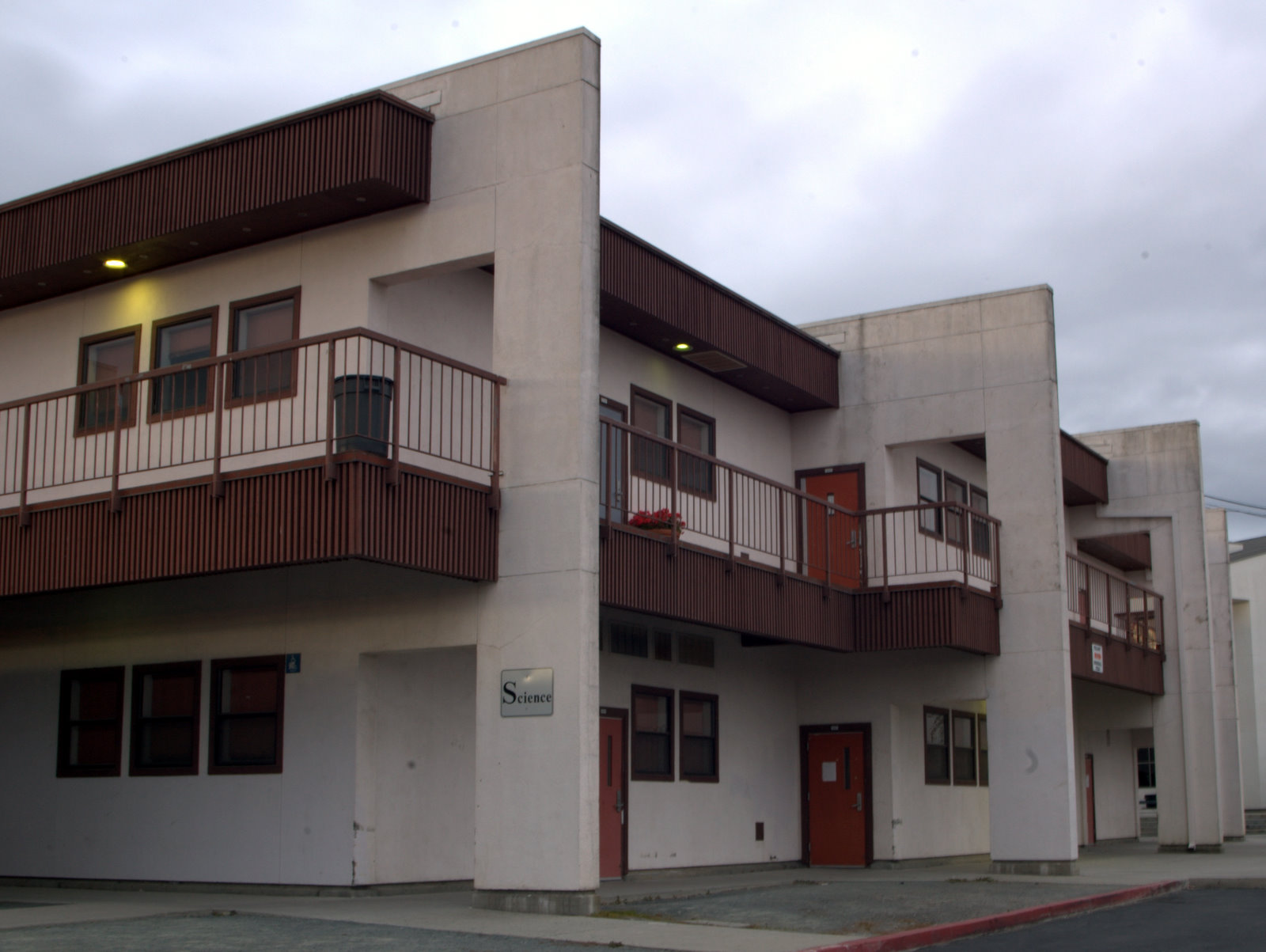
The science building (pre-2008/09 renovation)

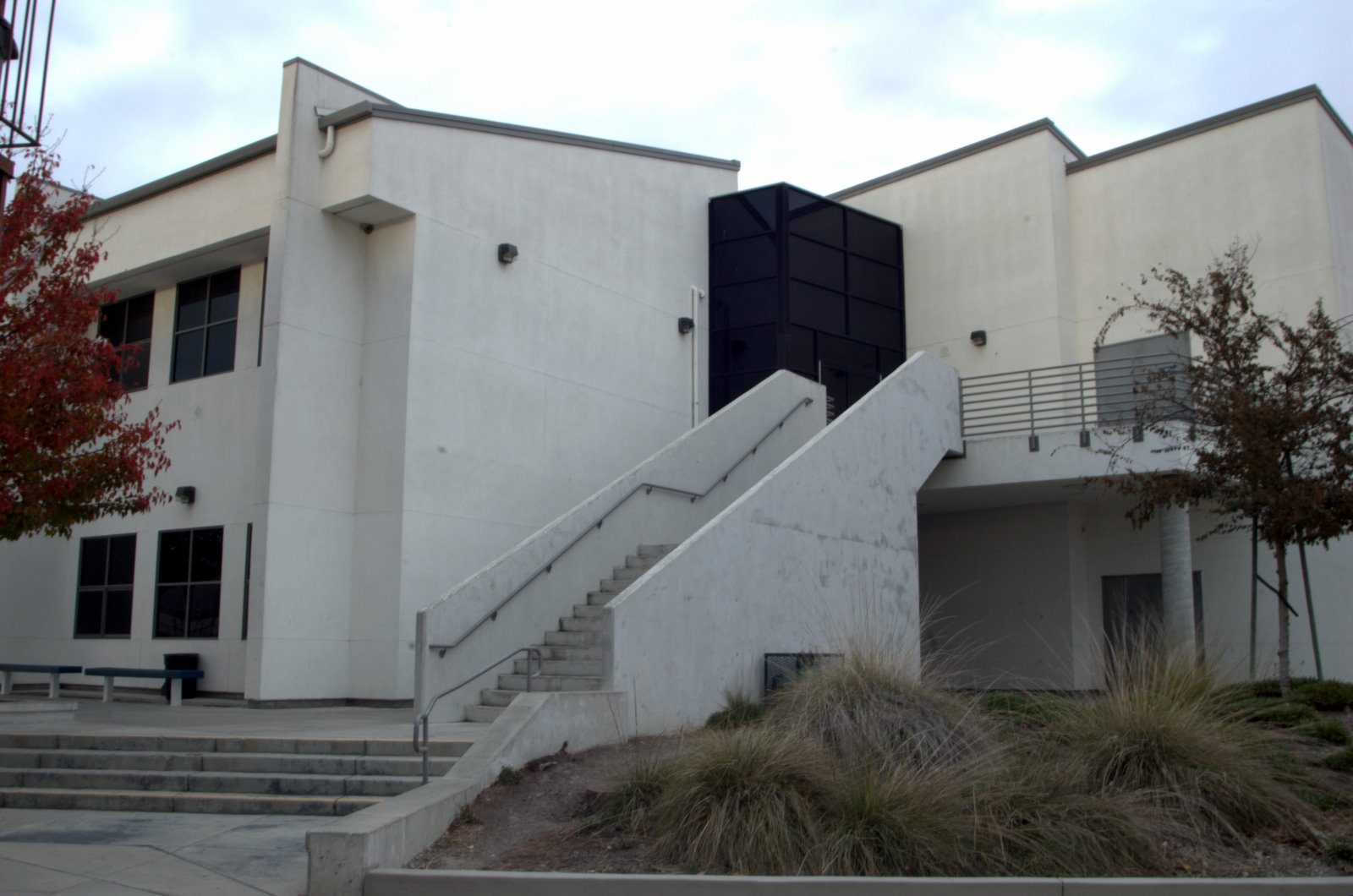
The foreign language building

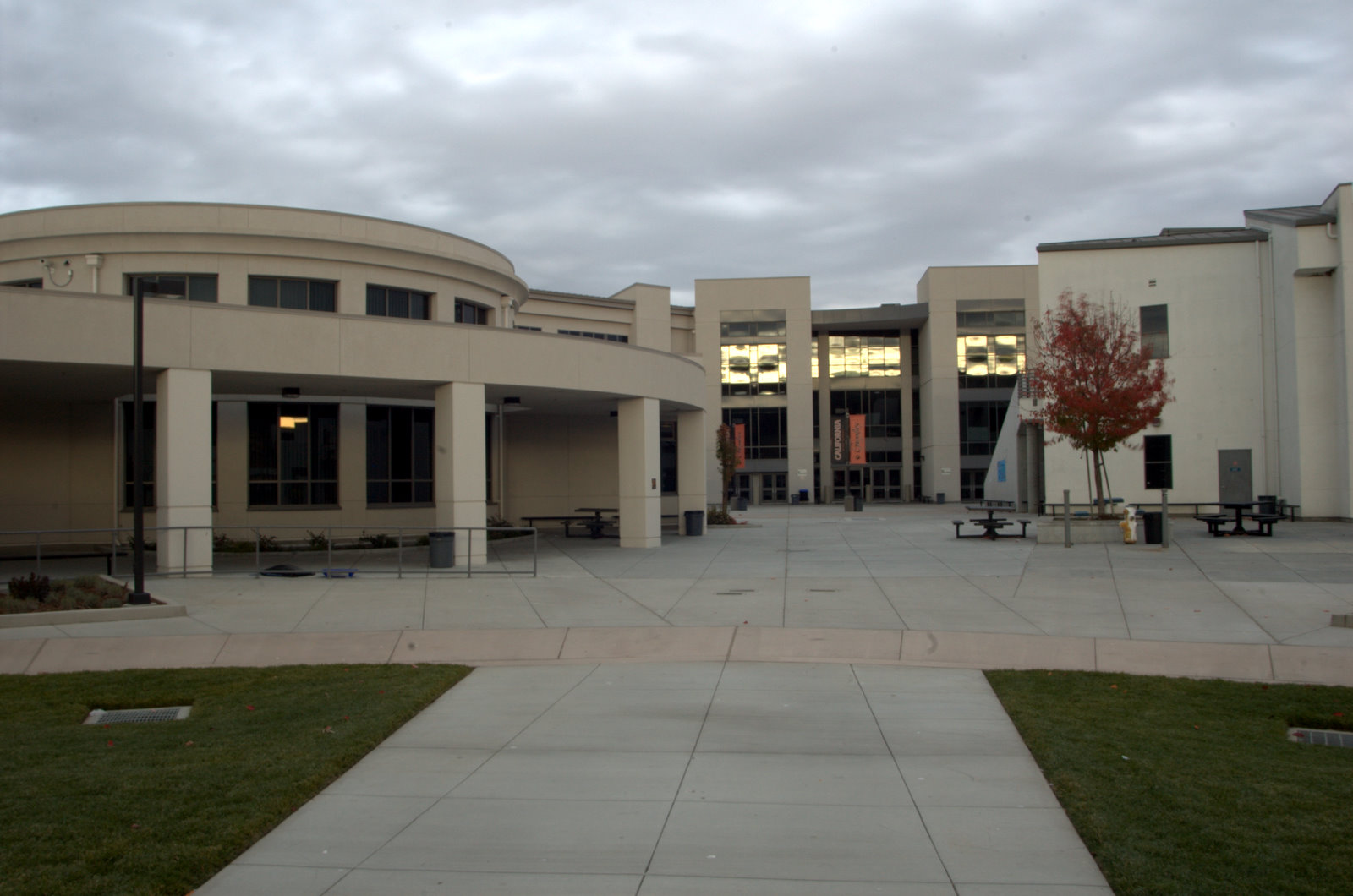
The library and main building
