= San Jose State Spartans baseball =

San Jose State Spartans
- 2026 San Jose State Spartans baseball team
- Founded: 1890
- University: San Jose State University
- Head coach: Brad Sanfilippo (9th season)
- Conference: Mountain West
- Location: San Jose, California
- Home stadium: Excite Ballpark (capacity: 4,200)
- Nickname: Spartans
- Colors: Gold, white, and blue

College World Series appearances
- 2000

NCAA regional champions
- 2000

NCAA tournament appearances
- 1955, 1971, 2000, 2002, 2023

Conference tournament champions
- 2023

Conference regular season champions
- 2023

The San Jose State Spartans baseball team represents San José State University in NCAA Division I college baseball as a member of the Mountain West Conference.

San Jose State fielded its first baseball team in 1890, although the current SJSU baseball media guide only provides records dating back to 1911. The team plays its home games at Excite Ballpark in San Jose, California. The team formerly played select home games at Blethen Field, which was located on San Jose State's south campus. In 2014, SJSU released plans to build a new baseball stadium to replace Blethen Field.

== History ==
The team first took the field in 1890. Known back then as the Normalites, the men's baseball beat a local high school team in the first recognized game. From 1911 through the 2013 season, the SJSU baseball team compiled a win–loss record of 1,878–1,696 (.525).

From 1965 to 2021, 104 Spartans were taken in the Major League Baseball draft and 19 were signed by MLB teams. As of 2021, seven former Spartans are active professional baseball players in both major and minor leagues.

The Spartan baseball team has made NCAA tournament appearances in 1955, 1971, 2000 and 2002. In 2000, the team advanced to the College World Series.

From 1997 to 2013, the SJSU baseball team competed in the Western Athletic Conference, earning three WAC pennants in 1997, 2000 and 2009.

Under head coach and SJSU alumnus Sam Piraro (1987–2012), the SJSU baseball team reached the 30-win mark 17 times (including five 40+ wins seasons) and appeared in the national rankings 47 times.

The SJSU baseball team has fielded 16 All-Americans including four first-team selections.

== All-time record vs. current Mountain West teams ==
As of the conclusion of the 2026 NCAA Division I baseball season:

Opponent	Won	Lost	Tied	Percentage
Air Force	28	39	0	.418
Fresno State	111	180	0	.381
Nevada	106	100	0	.515
Grand Canyon	8	3	0	.727
New Mexico	26	29	1	.473
San Diego State	33	73	0	.311
UNLV	42	53	0	.442
Washington State	12	24	0	.333
Totals	366	501	1	.422

== San Jose State in the NCAA tournament ==
The Spartans are 7–12 (.368) all-time in the NCAA Division I Baseball Championship.

Year	Rounds	Results
1955	Fresno Regional	Fresno Regional; Won 9–2 vs. Pepperdine; Won 3–1 @ Fresno State; Lost 4–9 @ Fresno State; Lost 1–5 @ Fresno State
1971	Santa Clara Regional	Santa Clara Regional; Lost 0–5 @ Santa Clara; Lost 1–3 @ Santa Clara
2000	Waco Regional; Houston Super Regional; College World Series	Waco Regional; Won vs. Florida 4–1; Won vs. SW Texas State 5–2; Lost vs. Florida 7–8; Won vs. Florida 2–1; Houston Super Regional; Won @ Houston 5–3; Lost 2–5 @ Houston; Won 3–2 @ Houston; College World Series; Lost vs. Clemson 6–10; Lost vs. Louisiana–Lafayette 3–6
2002	Stanford Regional	Stanford Regional; Lost 3–6 vs. Long Beach State; Lost 1–9 vs. CSU Fullerton
2023	Stanford Regional	Stanford Regional; Lost 2–13 vs. Stanford; Lost 5–9 vs. CSU Fullerton

== Major League Baseball ==
San José State has had 102 Major League Baseball draft selections since the draft began in 1965.

Spartans in the MLB Draft
Year	Player	Round	Team
1965	Gary Strom	46	Mets
1969	Michael Popovec	30	Expos
1969	Donald Kinzel	26	Phillies
1970	Gary Houston	4	Royals
1970	Thomas Corder	14	Dodgers
1971	Gregory Marshall	7	Royals
1971	Larry Lintz	6	Expos
1972	John Urzi	36	Royals
1972	Tim Day	12	Giants
1972	Michael Rusk	11	Yankees
1973	William Heigal	48	Royals
1973	Kristian Sorenson	36	Cardinals
1974	Mark Carroll	19	Padres
1975	Jeffrey Gingrich	10	Expos
1976	Glenn Williams	17	Rangers
1978	Randall Rambis	26	Indians
1978	Richard Raphael	25	Cubs
1978	Randy Johnson	11	Mets
1978	Rodney Kemp	10	Dodgers
1978	Richard Lane	10	Mets
1979	Matthew Maki	40	Indians
1979	Derek Bulcock	33	Twins
1980	John Tillema	8	Padres
1980	Mike Brown	7	Angels
1981	Mark Langston	2	Mariners
1983	John McLarnon	20	Phillies
1983	Huck Hibberd	19	Braves
1983	Ed Bass	17	Royals
1983	Sam Rebiejo	10	Yankees
1984	Tom Krause	30	Mariners
1984	Ron Rooker	16	Cardinals
1984	Huck Hibberd	8	Rangers
1984	Ken Caminiti	3	Astros
1985	Steven Vasquez	14	Braves
1985	Terrill Adams	12	Rangers
1986	Steven Ochoa	37	Phillies
1987	Monte Brooks	24	Padres
1987	Anthony Telford	3	Orioles
1988	Al Bacosa	62	Braves
1988	Eric Nelson	21	Expos
1988	Dan Archibald	14	Expos
1989	Kevin Tannahill	19	Brewers
1990	Matt Brown	40	Twins
1990	David Tellers	28	Pirates
1990	Eric Booker	27	Athletics
1990	Jeff Ball	12	Astros
1991	Ken Henderson	60	Giants
1991	Mark Ringkamp	24	Rangers
1991	Steve Anderson	23	Yankees
1992	Anthony Chavez	50	Angels
1993	Gerad Cawhorn	33	Indians
1993	Dave Zuniga	23	Mets
1994	Dave Sick	34	Angels
1994	Paul Pavicich	12	Twins
1996	Jason Davis	30	Phillies
1997	Jason Jiménez	28	Rays
1997	Javier Pamus	11	Astros
1998	Casey Cheshier	39	Braves
1998	Mike Wright	22	Marlins
1998	Tony James	20	Red Sox
1998	Javier Pamus	20	Royals
1999	Vince LaCorte	5	Angels
2000	Jeremy Rogelstad	18	Indians
2000	Chris Key	18	Marlins
2000	Joey Baker	16	Royals
2001	Brandon Macchi	34	Astros
2001	John Fagan	33	Astros
2001	Chris Sherman	30	Mets
2001	Matt Kauffman	13	Dodgers
2001	Junior Ruiz	9	Reds
2002	Jeremy Rogelstad	33	Phillies
2002	Hector Zamora	21	Yankees
2002	Jahseam George	18	Indians
2002	Gabe Lopez	17	Yankees
2002	Don Gemmell	12	Reds
2002	Adam Shorsher	6	Padres
2004	Jose Amaya	38	Indians
2004	Kevin Frandsen	12	Giants
2004	Matt Durkin	2	Mets
2005	Brad Kilby	29	Athletics
2005	Travis Becktel	15	Rockies
2005	Anthony Contreras	9	Giants
2006	Brandon Fromm	41	Mariners
2006	Branden Dewing	16	Athletics
2007	Donato Giovanatto	33	Angels
2009	Ryan Shopshire	32	Blue Jays
2009	Trevor Gibson	25	Rockies
2009	Max Peterson	18	Athletics
2009	David Berner	14	Astros
2009	Kyle Bellows	4	Indians
2011	Kerry Jenkins	38	Diamondbacks
2011	Esteban Guzman	17	Nationals
2011	Danny Steinstra	12	Cardinals
2011	Roberto Padilla	8	Rockies
2012	Michael Aldrete	39	Cardinals
2012	Zack Jones	4	Twins
2013	D.J. Slaton	37	Rays
2017	Matt Brown	27	Giants
2017	Josh Nashed	19	Indians
2019	Finn Del Bonta-Smith	22	Rockies
2019	Andrew Mitchel	8	Padres
2019	Kellen Strahm	5	Rangers
2021	Ruben Ibarra	4	Rangers
2022	Brady Hill	15	Rockies
2023	Charles McAdoo	3	Pirates

== Making it to Omaha ==
Under the direction of head coach Sam Piraro, the Spartans played in the College World Series in 2000 in Omaha, Nebraska. The eight teams who accompanied the Spartans in Omaha were Clemson, Florida State, Louisiana State, Stanford, Texas, Louisiana-Lafayette, and the University of Southern California. San Jose State was eliminated after the first round of the tournament by the number four seed, the Clemson Tigers.

== See also ==
- List of NCAA Division I baseball programs
