= Charles R. Smith (coach) =

American athlete, coach and college athletics administrator

Biographical details
- Died: 1969

Playing career

Football
- 1925–1927: San Diego State
- 1929: San Diego State

Basketball
- 1926–1928: San Diego State
- 1929–1931: San Diego State

Coaching career (HC unless noted)

Football
- 1934–1941: San Diego State (assistant)
- 1946–1961: San Diego State (assistant)

Basketball
- 1945–1948: San Diego State

Baseball
- 1936–1942: San Diego State
- 1946–1964: San Diego State

Administrative career (AD unless noted)
- 1947–1954: San Diego State

Head coaching record
- Overall: 45–36 (basketball); 555–289–10 (baseball)

Charles R. Smith (? – 1969) was an American football, basketball and baseball player, coach, and college athletics administrator. He served as the head baseball coach at San Diego State University from 1936 to 1942 and from 1946 to 1964, compiling a record of 555–289–10. Smith was also the head basketball coach at San Diego State from 1945 to 1948, tallying a mark of 45–36, and the school's athletic director from 1947 to 1954. In addition, he served as the president of the California Collegiate Athletic Association and as a district representative to the National Association of Intercollegiate Athletics. Smith was also a Brooklyn Dodgers scout for Southern California.

== Early life and playing career ==
Smith attended Coronado High School in Coronado, California, and then earned 12 varsity letters as San Diego State, four each in football, basketball, and baseball.

== Death and honors ==
Smith died in 1969. San Diego State University's home baseball field, Charlie Smith Field at Tony Gwynn Stadium, was named in Smith's honor.
