= Mark Martinez =

American baseball player and coach

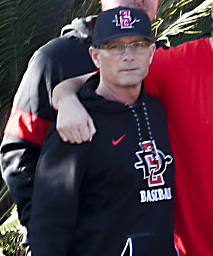
- Martinez at the Naval Special Warfare Center in 2020

Biographical details
- Born: December 18, 1961 (age 63); Aurora, Colorado, U.S.

Playing career
- 1982–1984: Mesa State
- Position: Shortstop

Coaching career (HC unless noted)
- 1985–1988: Mesa State (assistant)
- 1989–2005: New Mexico (assistant)
- 2006–2014: San Diego State (assistant)
- 2015–2023: San Diego State

Head coaching record
- Overall: 257–211 (.549)
- Tournaments: NCAA: 2–6

Accomplishments and honors

Championships
- 3× Mountain West Tournament (2015, 2017, 2018); Mountain West regular season (2023)

Awards
- MW Coach of the Year (2023)

Mark Eastman Martinez (born December 18, 1961) is an American college baseball coach and former shortstop. He is the former head baseball coach at San Diego State University. Martinez played college baseball at Mesa State College from 1982 to 1984. Martinez was previously assistant coach under Tony Gwynn at San Diego State from 2006 to 2014. Nearly two months after Gwynn's death, San Diego State promoted Martinez to head coach on August 20, 2014. On July 13, 2023, Martinez announced his retirement from coaching.

== Head coaching record ==
Statistics overview
Season	Team	Overall	Conference	Standing	Postseason
San Diego State Aztecs (Mountain West Conference) (2015–2023)
2015	San Diego State	41–23	21–9	2nd	NCAA Regional
2016	San Diego State	21–38	11–19	6th	
2017	San Diego State	42–21	20–10	2nd	NCAA Regional
2018	San Diego State	39–15	22–6	2nd	NCAA Regional
2019	San Diego State	32–25	16–13	2nd	
2020	San Diego State	10–6	0–0		Season canceled due to COVID-19
2021	San Diego State	30–16	22–14	2nd	
2022	San Diego State	18–38	10–20	T–6th	
2023	San Diego State	24–29	18–11	T–1st	
San Diego State:		257–211 (.549)	122–91 (.573)		
Total:		257–211 (.549)			
National champion Postseason invitational champion Conference regular season champion Conference regular season and conference tournament champion Division regular season champion Division regular season and conference tournament champion Conference tournament champion

== See also ==
- List of current NCAA Division I baseball coaches
