= San Diego State Aztecs baseball =

College baseball team

- 2026 San Diego State Aztecs baseball team
- Founded: 1936
- University: San Diego State University
- Head coach: Kevin Vance (1st season)
- Conference: Pac-12
- Location: San Diego, California
- Home stadium: Tony Gwynn Stadium (capacity: 3,000)
- Nickname: Aztecs
- Colors: Scarlet and black

NCAA tournament appearances
- 1979, 1981, 1982, 1983, 1984, 1986, 1990, 1991, 2009, 2013, 2014, 2015, 2017, 2018

Conference tournament champions
- Mountain West; 2000, 2013, 2014, 2015, 2017, 2018; WAC; 1990, 1991

Conference regular season champions
- Mountain West; 2002, 2004, 2023, 2026; WAC; 1986, 1988, 1990; CCAA; 1941, 1946, 1947, 1952, 1953, 1957, 1958, 1960; SCIAC; 1936, 1937, 1938

For information on all San Diego State University sports, see San Diego State Aztecs

The San Diego State Aztecs baseball team is the college baseball program that represents San Diego State University (SDSU). The Aztecs compete in NCAA Division I as a member of the Pac-12 Conference. The team plays its home games at Tony Gwynn Stadium.

Notable alumni include Baseball Hall of Fame inductee Tony Gwynn and World Series MVP Stephen Strasburg.

== Stadium ==
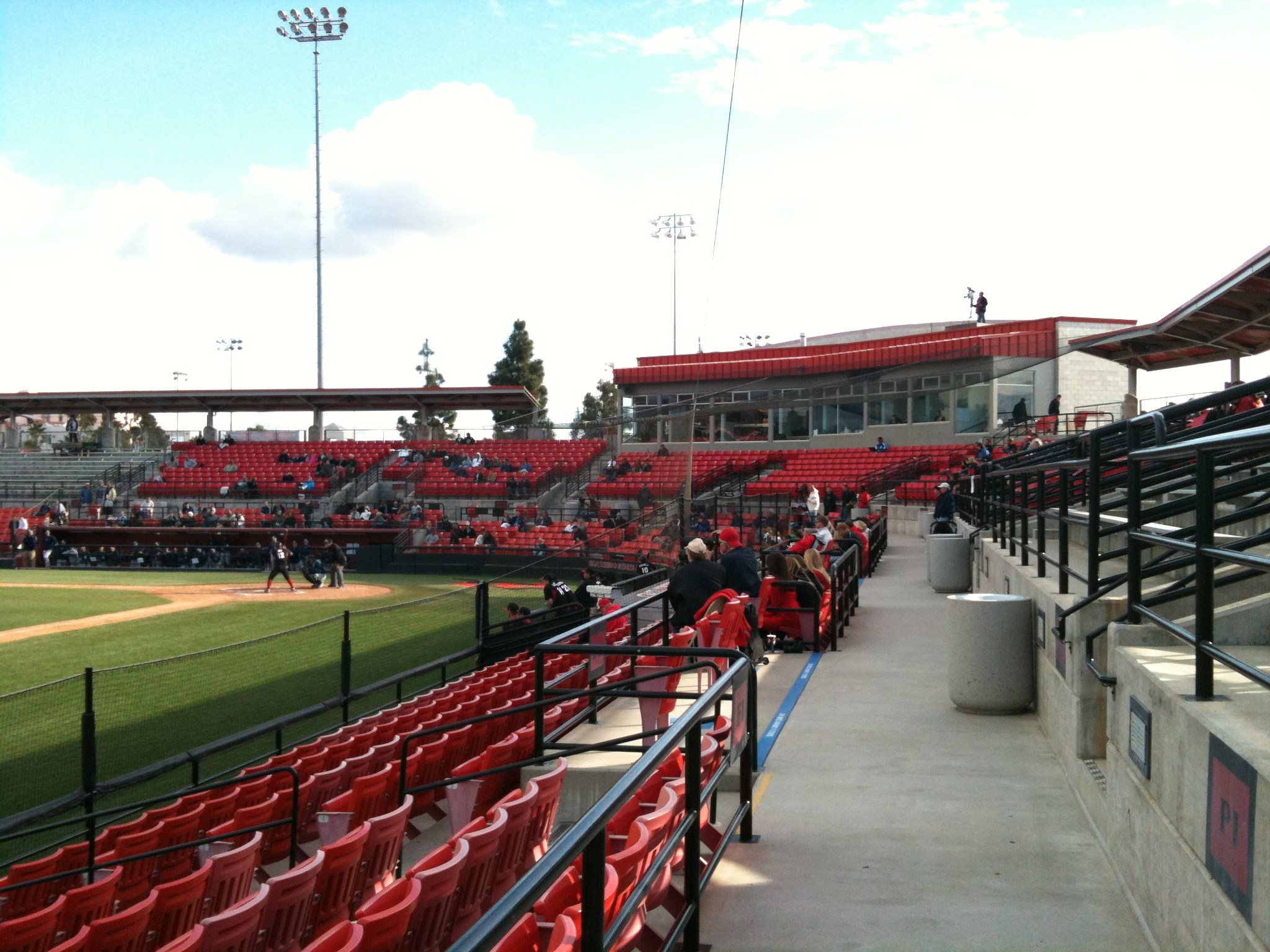
Tony Gwynn Stadium

Tony Gwynn Stadium is the Aztecs' home ballpark, located on the campus of the San Diego State University. The stadium opened in 1997 and hosts a capacity of 3,000.

The previous stadium at the same site was known as Smith Stadium in honor of Charlie Smith, the longtime San Diego State head baseball coach. In 1997, the stadium was rebuilt at a cost of $4 million, funded mainly by John Moores, then-owner of the San Diego Padres.

The new stadium was named in honor of Tony Gwynn, a Baseball Hall of Fame superstar for the Padres. The playing field retained Smith's name, and is officially known as Charlie Smith Field at Tony Gwynn Stadium.

== Head coaches ==
As of the 2020 Baseball Season

Tenure	Coach	Years	Record	Pct.
1936–1964	Charlie Smith	28	555–289–10	.656
1965–1971	Lyle Olsen	6	181–134–9	.573
1972–2002	Jim Dietz	30	1,231–750–18	.620
2003–2014	Tony Gwynn	12	363–363	.500
2014–2023	Mark Martinez	9	257–217	.542
2024–2025	Shaun Cole	2	37–76	.327
Totals	6 coaches	87 seasons	2,724–1,829–37	.597

Longest Tenure
Rank	Name	Seasons
1	Jim Dietz	30
2	Charlie Smith	28
3	Tony Gwynn	12

Most Wins
Rank	Name	Wins
1	Jim Dietz	1,231
2	Charlie Smith	555
3	Tony Gwynn	363

Best Winning Pct.
Rank	Name	Pct.
1	Charlie Smith	.656
2	Jim Dietz	.620
3	Lyle Olsen	.573

Through May 18, 2024.

== SDSU in the NCAA tournament ==
- The NCAA Division I baseball tournament started in 1947. San Diego State athletics joined Division I in 1970.
- The format of the tournament has changed through the years.

Year	Record	Pct	Notes
1979	2–2	.500	Lost in the NCAA Mideast Regional finals to Pepperdine.
1981	0–2	.000	Eliminated by Oral Roberts in the Midwest Regional.
1982	0–2	.000	Eliminated by Houston in the West II Regional.
1983	1–2	.333	Eliminated by UC Santa Barbara in the West I Regional Semi-Finals.
1984	3–2	.600	Lost in the NCAA West I Regional finals to Cal State Fullerton.
1986	0–2	.000	Eliminated by Texas-Pan American in the Central Regional.
1990	3–2	.600	Lost in the NCAA West I Regional finals to Stanford.
1991	0–2	.000	Eliminated by Portland in the West II Regional.
2009	1–2	.333	Eliminated by UC Irvine in the Irvine Regional.
2013	0–2	.000	Eliminated by San Diego in the Los Angeles Regional.
2014	0–2	.000	Eliminated by Louisiana-Lafayette in the Lafayette Regional.
2015	1–2	.333	Eliminated by USC in the Lake Elsinore (Calif.) Regional.
2017	1–2	.333	Eliminated UCLA Bruins in the Long Beach Regional. Eliminated by Long Beach State in the Long Beach Regional.
2018	0–2	.000	Eliminated by Northwestern State in the Corvallis Regional.
TOTALS	12–28	.300	

== All-time series records ==
As of the 2019 Media Guide

=== Mountain West members ===
Opponent	Games played	Wins	Losses	Percentage
Air Force	133	111	22	.834
Fresno State	205	102	103	.497
Nevada	51	22	29	.431
New Mexico	198	117	81	.590
San Jose State	111	79	32	.711
UNLV	157	94	63	.603
Totals	855	525	330	.614

Through May 25, 2019.
Note all-time series includes non-conference matchups.

== Player awards ==
=== All-Americans ===
The following is a listing of first team selections. Other selections are available at SDSU's official media guide.

- 1980

Tony Gwynn (OF) - ABCA

- 1984

Chris Gwynn (OF) - BA

- 1985

Chris Gwynn (OF) - SN

- 1995

Travis Lee (1B) - BA

- 1996

Travis Lee (1B) - ABCA, BA & SN

- 2008

Stephen Strasburg (P) - BA, CB & NCBWA

- 2009

Stephen Strasburg (P) - ABCA, BA, CA & NCBWA
Addison Reed (P) - ABCA, CB & NCBWA

- 2014

Michael Cederoth (P) - CB

Legend:

- ABCA = American Baseball Coaches Association
- BA = Baseball America
- CB = Collegiate Baseball
- NCBWA = National Collegiate Baseball Writers Association
- SN = Sporting News

== Alumni in Major League Baseball (MLB) ==
Dozens of Aztec baseball players have reached Major League Baseball (MLB) and played in regular season games. Through 2020, Aztec baseball alumni have a combined 37 MLB All-Star Game selections, 14 Gold Glove Awards, 9 World Series championships, and 3 No-hitters pitched (includes one combined no-hitter).

Player	Position	Seasons	Teams	Accolades
Pete Coscarart	2B/SS	1938–1946	Brooklyn Dodgers, Pittsburgh Pirates	All-Star (1940)
Jim Wilson	SP	1945–1946, 1948–1949, 1951–1958	Boston Red Sox, St. Louis Browns, Philadelphia Athletics, Boston Braves, Milwaukee Braves, Baltimore Orioles, Chicago White Sox	No-hitter on June 12, 1954 vs. Philadelphia Phillies; 3× All-Star (1954, 1955, 1956)
Earle Brucker Jr.	C	1948	Philadelphia Athletics	
Ed Wolfe	RP	1952	Pittsburgh Pirates	
Dave Morehead	SP	1963–1970	Boston Red Sox, Kansas City Royals	No-hitter on September 16, 1965 vs. Cleveland Indians
Don Shaw	RP	1967	New York Mets, Montreal Expos, St. Louis Cardinals, Oakland Athletics	
Graig Nettles	3B	1967–1988	Minnesota Twins, Cleveland Indians, New York Yankees, San Diego Padres, Atlanta Braves, Montreal Expos	2× World Series champion (1977, 1978); 6× All-Star (1975, 1977–1980, 1985); 2× Gold Glove Award (1977, 1978); ALCS MVP (1981); AL home run leader (1976); New York Yankees captain (1982–1984)
Dave Robinson	OF	1970–1971	San Diego Padres	
Jim Nettles	OF	1970–1972, 1974, 1979, 1981	Minnesota Twins, Detroit Tigers, Kansas City Royals, Oakland Athletics	
Gary Ryerson	SP	1972–1973	Milwaukee Brewers	
Dave Roberts	3B/C	1972–1975, 1977–1982	San Diego Padres, Texas Rangers, Houston Astros, Philadelphia Phillies	
John Andrews	RP	1973	St. Louis Cardinals	
Dave Smith	RP	1980–1992	Houston Astros, Chicago Cubs	2× All-Star (1986, 1990)
Bud Black	SP	1981–1995	Seattle Mariners, Kansas City Royals, Cleveland Indians, Toronto Blue Jays, San Francisco Giants	World Series champion (1985)
Bud Black	Pitching coach	2000–2006	Anaheim/Los Angeles Angels	World Series champion (2002)
Bud Black	Manager	2007–present	San Diego Padres, Colorado Rockies	NL Manager of the Year (2010)
Tony Gwynn	RF	1982–2001	San Diego Padres	National Baseball Hall of Fame (first ballot); 8× NL batting champion (1984, 1987, 1988, 1989, 1994, 1995, 1996, 1997); 15× All-Star (1984, 1985, 1986, 1987, 1989, 1990, 1991, 1992, 1993, 1994, 1995, 1996, 1997, 1998, 1999); 5× Gold Glove Award (1986, 1987, 1989, 1990, 1991); 7× Silver Slugger Award (1984, 1986, 1987, 1989, 1994, 1995, 1997); Roberto Clemente Award (1999); San Diego Padres No. 19 retired; San Diego Padres Hall of Fame
Harold Reynolds	2B	1983–1994	Seattle Mariners, Baltimore Orioles, California Angels	2× All-Star (1987, 1988); 3× Gold Glove Award (1988–1990); Roberto Clemente Award (1991); AL stolen base leader (1987)
Bobby Meacham	SS	1983–1988	New York Yankees	
Bobby Meacham	Third base/first base coach	2006–2012, 2020–2022	Florida Marlins, San Diego Padres, New York Yankees, Houston Astros, Philadelphia Phillies	
Mike Couchee	RP	1983	San Diego Padres	
Ed Amelung	OF	1984, 1986	Los Angeles Dodgers	
Al Newman	IF	1985–1992	Montreal Expos, Minnesota Twins, Texas Rangers	2× World Series champion (1987, 1991)
Chris Jones	OF	1985–1986	Houston Astros, San Francisco Giants	
Mark Williamson	RP	1987–1994	Baltimore Orioles	Combined no-hitter (with 3 teammates) on July 13, 1991 vs. Oakland Athletics
Chris Gwynn	OF	1987–1996	Los Angeles Dodgers, Kansas City Royals, San Diego Padres	Silver medal at 1984 Summer Olympics with United States national baseball team
Mark Grace	1B	1988–2003	Chicago Cubs, Arizona Diamondbacks	World Series champion (2001); 3× All-Star (1993, 1995, 1997); 4× Gold Glove Award (1992, 1993, 1995, 1996); Chicago Cubs Hall of Fame
Mark Grace	Hitting coach	2015–2016	Arizona Diamondbacks	
Jim Campbell	SP	1990	Kansas City Royals	
Nikco Riesgo	OF	1991	Montreal Expos	
Erik Plantenberg	RP	1993–1994, 1997	Seattle Mariners, Philadelphia Phillies	
Jeff Barry	OF	1995, 1998–1999	New York Mets, Colorado Rockies	
Tony Clark	1B	1995–2009	Detroit Tigers, Boston Red Sox, New York Mets, New York Yankees, Arizona Diamondbacks, San Diego Padres	All-Star (2001)
Travis Lee	1B	1998–2006	Arizona Diamondbacks, Philadelphia Phillies, Tampa Bay Devil Rays, New York Yankees	Gold medal at 1996 Summer Olympics with United States national baseball team
Dan Murray	RP	1999–2000	New York Mets, Kansas City Royals	
Jeff DaVanon	OF	1999, 2001–2007	Anaheim/Los Angeles Angels, Arizona Diamondbacks, Oakland Athletics	
Jerrod Riggan	RP	2000–2003	New York Mets, Cleveland Indians	
Justin Brunette	RP	2000	St. Louis Cardinals	
Jason Phillips	C/1B	2001–2007	New York Mets, Los Angeles Dodgers, Toronto Blue Jays	
Jim Rushford	OF	2002	Milwaukee Brewers	
Alex Pelaez	IF	2002	San Diego Padres	
Aaron Harang	SP	2002–2015	Oakland Athletics, Cincinnati Reds, San Diego Padres, Los Angeles Dodgers, Seattle Mariners, New York Mets, Atlanta Braves, Philadelphia Phillies	NL wins leader (2006); NL strikeout leader (2006)
Royce Ring	RP	2005–2008, 2010	New York Mets, San Diego Padres, Atlanta Braves, New York Yankees	
Tony Gwynn Jr.	OF	2006–2012, 2014	Milwaukee Brewers, San Diego Padres, Los Angeles Dodgers, Philadelphia Phillies	
Justin Masterson	SP	2008–2015	Boston Red Sox, Cleveland Indians, St. Louis Cardinals	All-Star (2013)
Alex Hinshaw	RP	2008–2009, 2012	San Francisco Giants, San Diego Padres, Chicago Cubs	
Edgar Gonzalez	2B	2008–2009	San Diego Padres	
Lance Zawadzki	IF	2010	San Diego Padres	
Stephen Strasburg	SP	2010–2022	Washington Nationals	World Series champion (2019); World Series MVP (2019); 3× All-Star (2012, 2016, 2017); All-MLB First Team (2019); Silver Slugger Award (2012); NL wins leader (2019); NL strikeout leader (2014); Immaculate inning on July 3, 2019 vs. Miami Marlins; Bronze medal at 2008 Summer Olympics with United States national baseball team
Addison Reed	RP/CL	2011–2018	Chicago White Sox, Arizona Diamondbacks, New York Mets, Boston Red Sox, Minnesota Twins	
Bruce Billings	RP	2011, 2014	Colorado Rockies, Oakland Athletics, New York Yankees	
Quintin Berry	OF	2012–2015, 2017	Detroit Tigers, Boston Red Sox, Baltimore Orioles, Chicago Cubs, Milwaukee Brewers	World Series champion (2013)
Quintin Berry	First base/third base coach	2021–present	Milwaukee Brewers, Chicago Cubs	
Greg Allen	OF	2017–2023	Cleveland Indians, San Diego Padres, New York Yankees, Pittsburgh Pirates	
Ty France	1B	2019–present	San Diego Padres, Seattle Mariners, Cincinnati Reds	All Star (2022)
Seby Zavala	C	2019, 2021–present	Chicago White Sox, Arizona Diamondbacks, Seattle Mariners	
Alan Trejo	IF	2021–present	Colorado Rockies	Bronze medal at 2023 World Baseball Classic with Mexico national baseball team
Garrett Hill	SP/RP	2022–2023	Detroit Tigers	
David Hensley	IF	2022–present	Houston Astros, Miami Marlins	World Series champion (2022)
Casey Schmitt	IF	2023–present	San Francisco Giants	

== See also ==
- List of NCAA Division I baseball programs
