= Tony Gwynn Stadium =

Ballpark in San Diego, California

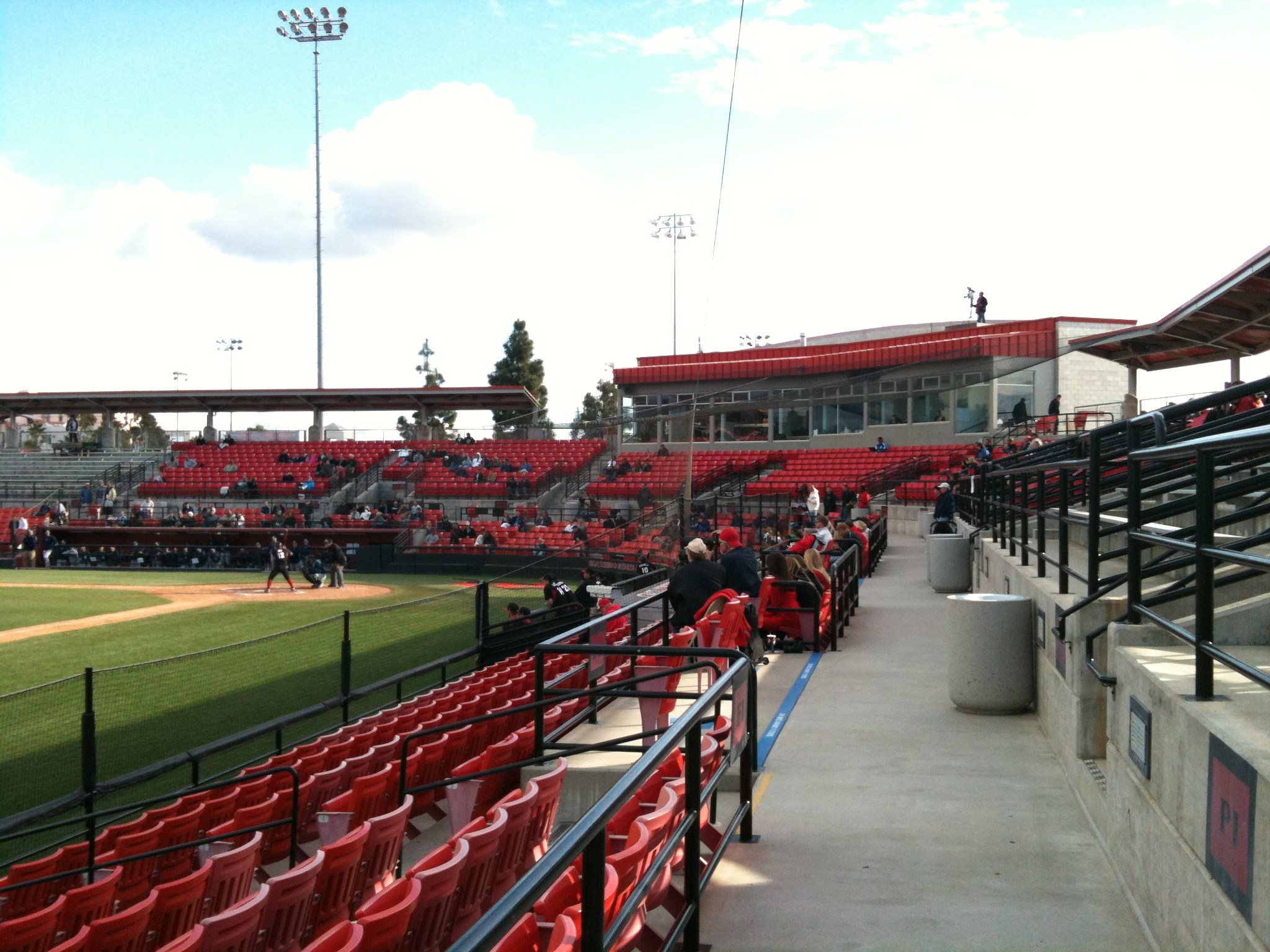
- Interactive map of Tony Gwynn Stadium
- Address: Plaza Deportes
- Location: San Diego, California
- Coordinates: 32°46′28″N 117°04′42″W
- Owner: San Diego State University
- Operator: San Diego State University
- Capacity: 3,000
- Surface: Tif Santa Ana grass
- Record attendance: 3,337
- Field size: Left Field – 340 feet (104 m); Left-Center – 365 feet (111 m); Center Field – 412 feet (126 m); Right-Center – 365 feet (111 m); Right Field – 340 feet (104 m)

Construction
- Groundbreaking: August 21, 1996
- Opened: 1997
- Cost: $4 million
- Architect: Populous

Tenants
- San Diego State Aztecs (NCAA) (1997–present); San Diego Surf Dawgs (GBL) (2005–2006)

Tony Gwynn Stadium is a ballpark in San Diego, California, located on the campus of San Diego State University (SDSU). Opened in 1997, it is the home of the San Diego State Aztecs baseball team. The Aztecs compete in NCAA Division I as a member of the Pac-12 Conference (Pac-12).

== History ==
The original stadium was named Smith Field in honor of Charlie Smith, the longtime San Diego State head baseball coach. The stadium was demolished and rebuilt in 1997 at a cost of $4 million, funded largely thanks to a donation by John Moores, then owner of the San Diego Padres. The renovated stadium was named in honor of Tony Gwynn, a Hall of Fame superstar for the Padres. The playing field is still known as Charlie Smith Field. As an undergraduate, Gwynn played both baseball and basketball for the Aztecs. He became San Diego State's head baseball coach after he retired from the Padres.

The San Diego Surf Dawgs of the independent Golden Baseball League used the park as their home field from 2005 to 2006.

== Features ==
Among the amenities contained within the stadium are the following:

- The SDSU "Wall of Fame" is located just beyond the right field wall of the stadium.
- A novelty/souvenir shop located on the outer concourse, featuring SDSU merchandise.
- The Stephen and Mary Birch Baseball Museum is located at the north end of the third base stand. The museum features numerous items relating to the history of baseball at San Diego State.
- Four sky boxes adjacent to the press box for visiting dignitaries and groups to view games.
- There is an alumni lounge near the elevator on the ground floor that serves as reception area and hosts various functions. The room was provided by former Aztec pitcher Bud Black, who oversaw much of the work on the project himself.
- The "Krejci" (Kray-chi) barbecue/picnic Area is available between the end of the permanent stands and the batting cage buildings down the right field line. Which is dedicated to Emil "Archie" Krejci for dedicating well over a decade to the maintenance of the field, stands, stadium and other stadium amenities. Archie was in the dugout at every home game and traveled with the team to their away games. He was known to be best friends with long time Aztecs coach Jim Dietz.

== See also ==
- List of NCAA Division I baseball venues
