= Johnny Nansen =

American football coach (born 1974)

Current position
- Title: Co-defensive coordinator & inside linebackers coach
- Team: Texas
- Conference: SEC

Biographical details
- Born: February 28, 1974 (age 52); Apia, Samoa
- Education: Washington State University

Playing career
- 1992–1996: Washington State
- Position: Linebacker

Coaching career (HC unless noted)
- 1998: Cabrillo HS (CA) (DC)
- 1999: Louisville (GA)
- 2000: Montana State (RB)
- 2001–2002: Idaho State (CB)
- 2003: Idaho State (DB)
- 2004–2006: Idaho (ST/LB)
- 2007–2008: Idaho (ST/DL)
- 2009–2011: Washington (ST/DL)
- 2012–2013: Washington (AHC/ST/RB)
- 2014–2015: USC (AHC/ST/RB)
- 2016–2018: USC (AHC/LB)
- 2019: USC (ILB)
- 2020–2021: UCLA (DL)
- 2022–2023: Arizona (DC/ILB)
- 2024–present: Texas (co-DC/ILB)

Johnny Nansen (born February 28, 1974) is a Samoan-born American football coach and former linebacker. He is the co-defensive coordinator and inside linebackers coach for the University of Texas at Austin, a position he has held since 2024.

== Early life ==
Nansen was born on February 28, 1974, in Apia, Samoa and lived in Laulii, American Samoa early in his childhood. Nansen moved to the mainland United States at the age of 14.

== Playing career ==
Nansen played football at Jordan High School in Long Beach, California and went on to play college football at Washington State University, where he was on the team from 1992 to 1996. After lettering on the football team for three years, Nansen earned his bachelor's degree in business administration in 1997.

== Coaching career ==
=== Early coaching career ===
Nansen began coaching in 1998, serving as defensive coordinator for Cabrillo High School in Long Beach, California. The following year, Nansen served as a graduate assistant for the Louisville Cardinals and worked with the defensive line. He then served a one-year stint at Montana State, followed by a four-year stint at Idaho State, where he coached cornerbacks from 2001 to 2002 and the entire secondary in 2003.

=== Idaho ===
Nansen's first Division I-A job was with the Idaho Vandals. Nansen spent five seasons (2004–2008) at Idaho; he coached the linebackers from 2004 to 2006 and the defensive line from 2007 to 2008. He also served as special teams coordinator for his entire tenure there.

=== Washington ===
Nansen returned to the Power Five with a five-season stint at Washington. He coached the defensive line from 2009 to 2011 and the running backs from 2012 to 2013; he was also in charge of special teams during those five years. Washington played in four bowl games while Nansen was there and produced a top 20 rushing offense during his final year there.

=== USC ===
Nansen spent the next six seasons of his coaching career at USC. He served as assistant head coach from 2014 to 2018, and he also coached running backs from 2014 to 2015, linebackers from 2016 to 2018, and inside linebackers in his final year at USC in 2019. In 2018 he was nominated for the Broyles Award.

=== UCLA ===
In 2020, Nansen was hired as the defensive line coach at UCLA, following the departure of the Bruins' defensive line coach Vince Oghobaase to Boston College.

=== Arizona ===
In December 2021 he was named the defensive coordinator for the Arizona Wildcats under Jedd Fisch to replace Don Brown.

=== Texas ===
In January 2024, Nansen joined the Longhorns as a co-defensive coordinator/inside linebackers coach, reuniting with Steve Sarkisian. Sarkisian and Nansen had previous work experience together at Washington and USC.
