= Cabrillo High School =

There are multiple Cabrillo High Schools:

- Cabrillo High School (Lompoc, California) in Lompoc, California.
- Cabrillo High School (Long Beach, California), "Juan Rodriguez Cabrillo High School" in Long Beach, California
