= Tony Gwynn =

American baseball player (1960–2014)

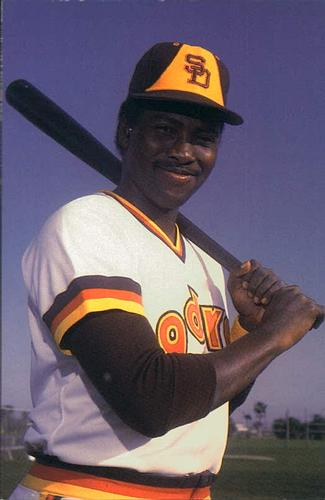
- Gwynn with the San Diego Padres in 1983
- Right fielder
- Born: May 9, 1960; Los Angeles, California, U.S.
- Died: June 16, 2014 (aged 54); Poway, California, U.S.
- Batted: Left Threw: Left

MLB debut
- July 19, 1982, for the San Diego Padres

Last MLB appearance
- October 7, 2001, for the San Diego Padres

MLB statistics
- Batting average: .338
- Hits: 3,141
- Home runs: 135
- Runs batted in: 1,138
- Stats at Baseball Reference

Teams
- San Diego Padres (1982–2001)

Career highlights and awards
- 15× All-Star (1984–1987, 1989–1999); 5× Gold Glove Award (1986–1987, 1989–1991); 7× Silver Slugger Award (1984, 1986–1987, 1989, 1994–1995, 1997); Roberto Clemente Award (1999); 8× NL batting champion (1984, 1987–1989, 1994–1997); Commissioner's Historic Achievement Award; San Diego Padres No. 19 retired; San Diego Padres Hall of Fame

Member of the National

Baseball Hall of Fame
- Induction: 2007
- Vote: 97.6% (first ballot)

Anthony Keith Gwynn Sr. (May 9, 1960 – June 16, 2014), nicknamed "Mr. Padre", was an American professional baseball right fielder who played 20 seasons (1982–2001) in Major League Baseball (MLB) for the San Diego Padres. The left-handed hitting Gwynn won eight batting titles in his career, which is tied for the most in National League (NL) history. He was a 15-time All-Star and won seven Silver Slugger Awards and five Gold Glove Awards. Gwynn stayed with the Padres his entire career and played in the only two World Series appearances in San Diego franchise history. Having hit over .300 for 19 straight seasons, Gwynn retired with a .338 career batting average, the highest mark since Ted Williams retired in 1960; Gwynn also holds the highest adjusted batting average of all time at .342. He was inducted into the Baseball Hall of Fame in 2007 in his first year of eligibility, and is widely considered the best pure hitter of his generation.

Gwynn attended San Diego State University (SDSU), where he played both college baseball and basketball for the Aztecs. He was an all-conference player in both sports in the Western Athletic Conference (WAC), and was also honored as an All-American in baseball. Gwynn was selected by the Padres in the third round of the 1981 MLB draft as the 58th overall pick. He made his major-league debut the next year and won his first batting title in 1984, when San Diego advanced to its first-ever World Series. Gwynn was a poor fielder in college and the minor leagues, but improved over time and received his first Gold Glove in 1986. The next year, he won the first of three consecutive batting titles. From 1990 to 1994, Gwynn endured four injury-shortened seasons, then had four straight batting titles starting in 1994, when he batted a career-high .394 in a strike-shortened season. Gwynn played in his second World Series in 1998 and reached the 3,000-hit milestone the following year. He played two more seasons, hampered by injuries in both, and retired after the 2001 season with 3,141 career hits.

A contact hitter, Gwynn frequently hit the ball to the opposite field. After first meeting Hall of Famer Ted Williams in 1992, Gwynn modified his hitting approach and became more adept at pulling the ball and using the entire field, as well as hitting for more power. In his early career years, he was also a threat to steal bases. In an era before MLB teams used video for scouting, Gwynn pioneered the practice of recording and studying video to improve his hitting, for which he received the nickname "Captain Video". Widely considered the greatest player in Padres history, Gwynn regularly accepted less money to remain with the small-market team; he became a civic icon for the city of San Diego.

During his later playing years and throughout retirement, Gwynn was an outspoken critic of performance-enhancing drugs in baseball. After he retired from playing, the Padres retired his No. 19 in 2004. Gwynn became the head baseball coach at his alma mater university and also spent time as a baseball analyst. Gwynn developed a decades-long addiction to smokeless tobacco as a young adult, and was diagnosed with salivary gland cancer in 2010; Gwynn died of the cancer in 2014 at the age of 54. His death increased awareness regarding tobacco usage in MLB, leading to the 2016 league-wide ban on the substance for new players.

== Early life and family ==
=== Family background ===
Gwynn was born in Los Angeles, California, to Charles and Vendella Gwynn, who originated from Gallatin, Tennessee. Charles excelled at sports, preferring football and baseball which he played in high school, and was also very passionate about history and politics; he spent the majority of his young adulthood in the 1950s serving in the U.S. Army. Vendella grew up in a large family and house upon several acres of land that functioned as a small farm; she was also athletically inclined, particularly in basketball and volleyball. The pair met and married in the mid-1950s. In 1958, Gwynn's older brother Charles Jr. was born and sometime thereafter, Charles was discharged from the Army. In 1959, Charles decided to move the family west from Tennessee under the belief that doing so would provide additional economic opportunity for a young black family.

=== Childhood ===
The family's first residence in California was a two-bedroom apartment and they had one car, a Chrysler 300. Gwynn's favorite meals were Friday dinner because he'd get to eat fish, and any meals on Saturday and Sunday because that's when the whole family was together. Shortly after younger brother Chris was born in late 1964, the family moved to a larger apartment, a second-floor duplex that included a small grass backyard unlike the previous apartment. In the yard, Gwynn and Charles Jr. frequently played basketball games such as "Twenty-one" and "H-O-R-S-E" using a trash can against the building's back wall as the basket. Gwynn's "big thrill" was regularly going to the store to get RC Cola for his father using the latter's borrowed money. On one of these occasions when Gwynn returned from the store with the cola, he was also chewing a wad of gum; his father noticed this and asked Gwynn where the gum came from, and he confessed to shoplifting the gum. His father responded by taking Gwynn downstairs to a bush out in front of the apartment building, and pulling a switch from it to punish him with.

Gwynn's favorite time of year was the annual summer family vacation to go visit his grandparents in Tennessee for six days, traveling in the family car. He personally liked his paternal grandparents more, but preferred to stay with his maternal grandparents because their residence (where his mother grew up) had acres of open land and a farm, which Gwynn said was "like a paradise". He gathered eggs from the chicken coop every morning and cooked breakfast with them, and also played baseball using black walnuts that had fallen. Through these visits, Gwynn grew an affinity for his grandmother Callie's Southern cooking.

At age nine, Gwynn received a Sting-Ray bike with a banana seat from his parents coupled with the expectation that he was to use it to fetch groceries from the store. Gwynn refused to have a bicycle basket installed, insisting that it was only for "sissies", so he hauled groceries home using his arms. He was also allowed to use the bike for play; one time while doing so near the family's parked car, he crashed the bike into Chris who appeared out of nowhere. Chris bled from his face from hitting the cement, and had to be hospitalized with five stitches. Gwynn's parents initially threatened to whip Gwynn upon learning about the incident, but later changed their minds after discussing it with Chris, believing it was impossible for the boys to see each other before the crash.

A few weeks after the bike crash, his parents decided they would move from their apartment and buy a house in nearby Long Beach, a location they chose because of its schools, parks, and youth sports options throughout the year. Gwynn joined a Little League team in Long Beach at the age of nine. When the coach asked him which position he wished to play, Gwynn indicated that he wanted to be the first baseman since he was left-handed, but the coach said that spot was occupied by a returning left-handed player, and instead offered the center fielder position to Gwynn. Gwynn's parents were civil servants and tag-team parents. Gwynn's father worked at a warehouse from 7:30 a.m. to 5:00 p.m., and he also coached Pop Warner football and Little League Baseball; his mother worked at the post office from 5:30 p.m. to 3:00 a.m. His mother and father instilled in him the value of being prepared. He played mostly basketball, then his favorite sport. Gwynn seldom played tennis, but readily defeated his older brother Charles Jr. (who regularly practiced the sport) when challenged.

Gwynn's father encouraged his sons to play ball in the makeshift baseball field that he assembled in their backyard. The setup was a narrow strip of grass that was longer than it was wide. Pulling the ball too much resulted in it being lost over the neighbor's fence, but left field being short ruled out hitting it to the opposite field. Once the brothers' supply of wiffle balls was out, they resorted to using a sock rolled in rubber bands, a wad of tape, or a hardened fig from a neighbor's tree. Gwynn could pull the ball in his backyard, but he would naturally hit it the other way during regular games. Growing up, he attended Los Angeles Dodgers games and watched his hero, Willie Davis; the Dodgers outfielder had twice as many stolen bases as home runs (398 SB, 182 HR) in his career. Gwynn admired Davis for being black, left-handed, and "aggressive but under control"; he respected Davis' work habits as well. Unlike other kids who tracked home run hitters, Gwynn checked the box scores in the newspaper every morning to follow high-average hitters like Pete Rose, George Brett, and Rod Carew. By age thirteen, Gwynn had joined an adult baseball league.

=== High school years ===
Gwynn attended Long Beach Polytechnic High School, a high-profile sports school. In high school, Gwynn considered himself to be "kind of a nerd" and also shy, particularly with girls. His friends often attended parties with drugs and alcohol on Friday nights, but Gwynn abstained from such activities to avoid disappointing his parents and squandering future opportunities. Gwynn worked during the summers. One year, he got a job as a softball coach at Silverado Park after his name was chosen in a lottery drawing for the position; some of his responsibilities included managing the field, painting the foul lines, and picking up trash from the field. Another year, he was on a crew that painted athletic facilities in Long Beach public schools. Gwynn also played summer baseball for the Long Beach Jets (coached by 1964 Olympic high jumper John Rambo) in the Joe DiMaggio Summer League at Blair Field. Gwynn was the center fielder and his younger brother Chris was on the team. One year, Gwynn and the Jets won the local league and advanced to the state tournament in San Rafael of Northern California; they were defeated in the championship game.

He was a two-sport star in basketball and baseball. In his final two years, his Jackrabbits baseball team was a combined 3–25–2 in the league, while his basketball team went a combined 53–6 and twice reached the California Interscholastic Federation (CIF)'s Southern Section 4A championship game. Gwynn had considered quitting baseball as a senior to concentrate on basketball, but his mother talked him out of it. "She said it might be something down the road and that I might be sorry later if I didn't play," recalled Gwynn.

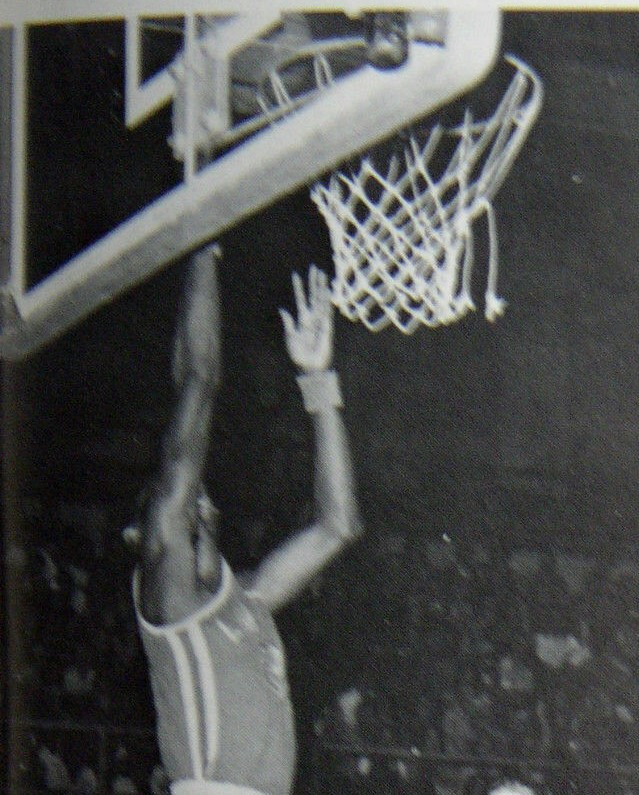
Gwynn was a standout basketball player in both high school (pictured) and college.

As a junior, he was the starting point guard on Poly's basketball team, which went 30–1 and won the Southern Section 4A title that year. The final was played for more than 10,000 fans at the Long Beach Arena, where Gwynn scored 10 points in the 69–50 victory over Buena of Ventura. His teammates included Michael Wiley, who became a professional player in the National Basketball Association (NBA). In Gwynn's senior year, Poly was 23–7, and again advanced to the championship round, despite finishing third in the Moore League. Their bid for a second straight title ended with a 57–50 loss to Pasadena. Gwynn averaged 10.3 points and totaled 178 assists for the season, and he was named to the All-CIF Southern Section Second Team. After the season, he switched to baseball, which was already well underway for the year. Despite his shortened season, he earned first-team All-Southern Section honors after batting .563. Poly's baseball team's struggles taught him to remain focused, continue executing, and stay productive.

Gwynn received scholarship offers to play college basketball but none for college baseball. He also went unselected in the 1977 MLB draft, which Gwynn attributed to his limited playing time. He wanted to play both sports for Cal State Fullerton, which was fine with basketball coach Bobby Dye, but baseball coach Augie Garrido did not believe that an athlete could handle both sports in college. San Diego State basketball coach Tim Vezie wanted Gwynn to commit to two years of basketball before playing baseball. Gwynn also had an offer from Texas Christian University (TCU), but he was told that he would be their first black player in 30 years, which ruled them out from his consideration. He chose to attend SDSU, calling it "the best option I had."

== College career ==
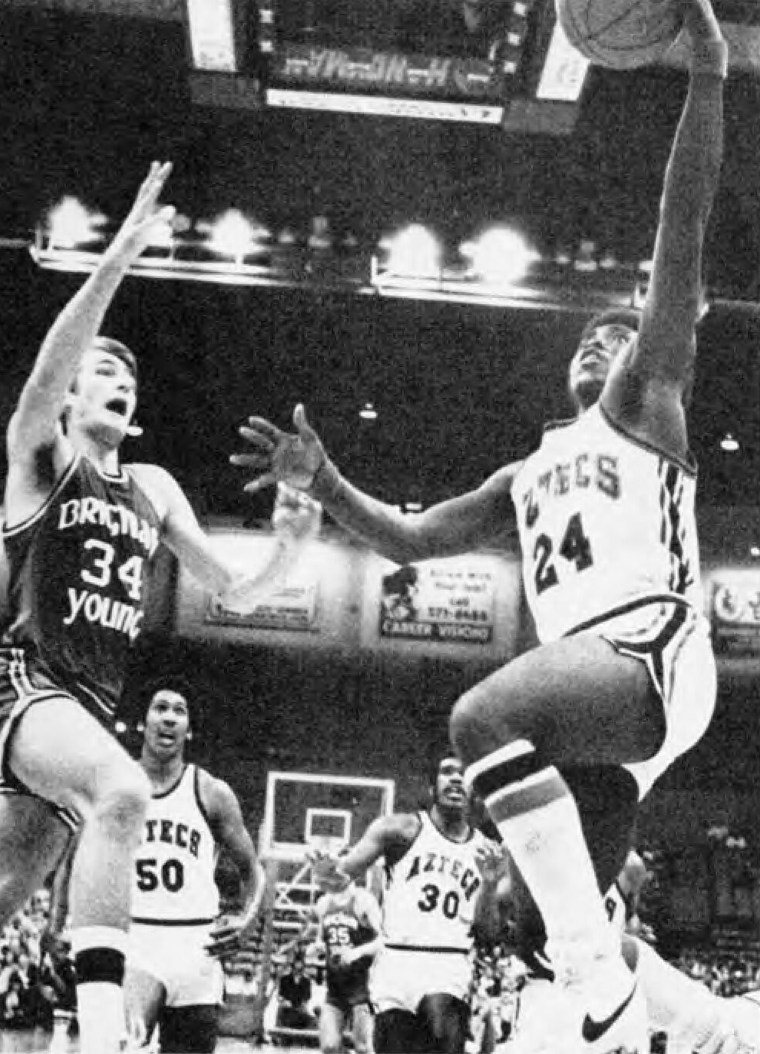
Gwynn set school records for assists playing basketball at San Diego State.

Gwynn was a two-sport star with San Diego State, playing three seasons of baseball and four of basketball. He was a recreation major. He was an All-American outfielder in his final two seasons, when he led the team in hitting. A skilled playmaker in basketball, he set multiple school records for assists. He was the first player in the history of the WAC to earn all-conference honors in basketball and baseball. Gwynn was not allowed to play baseball as a freshman. He was overweight at 205 pounds (93 kg), and Vezie wanted him to get in shape for the next basketball season.

By the following season in 1979, Gwynn still had not heard from Aztecs baseball coach Jim Dietz about joining the team after the basketball season. However, an opportunity arose after two outfielders riding bicycles were struck by an automobile and injured, leaving Dietz in need of replacements. Freshman shortstop Bobby Meacham, who played against Gwynn in high school, convinced the coach to give Gwynn a chance. Dietz had never seen Gwynn play but contacted him mostly because he trusted Meacham. Vezie by then had been fired, and his successor, Smokey Gaines, allowed Gwynn to play baseball. Were it not for the accident, Gwynn doubted he would have ever played baseball with SDSU. "Knowing what I now do about Coach Dietz ... [h]e's too loyal to his athletes to have allowed me to walk over after basketball season and join the team," remarked Gwynn.

In baseball, Gwynn was primarily a left fielder and designated hitter (DH) at San Diego State. He hit .301 in his first season but said he "stunk defensively." After his first season of baseball with the Aztecs, Gwynn played collegiate summer baseball for the Boulder Collegians while also enrolling in 10 transferable summer school units at the University of Colorado Boulder. During a game with the Collegians, he tripped while rounding first base trying to stretch a single into a double, and went down in pain having dislocated his ankle. Coach Jim Dietz chose to pop Gwynn's ankle back into place, because Dietz believed that having surgery done instead would've harmed Gwynn's chances of playing professional baseball; Gwynn was sent home for the remainder of the summer. In 1980, Gwynn hit .423 with six home runs and 29 runs batted in (RBI), and was named third-team All-American by Baseball News. The following season, he was a first-team All-American after batting .416 with 11 home runs and 62 RBI. He also was named a first-team All-WAC outfielder. In his three years, he had a career average of .398, and the team went 146–61–4.

Playing basketball, Gwynn set Aztecs basketball records for assists in a game (18), season (221), and career (590), records that still remain unbeaten at SDSU. He was twice named to the All-WAC Second Team, and he averaged 8.8 points per game his senior year. Playing point guard developed Gwynn's baseball skills, as the dribbling strengthened his wrists—avoiding what he called "slow bat syndrome"—and basketball taught him to be quick, which improved his baserunning. He could dunk a basketball, though he was unable to palm the ball with his small hands. He had a quick first step in either sport and was able to run 60 yards (55 m) in 6.7 seconds.

Gwynn indirectly received exposure from scouts who were interested in Meacham, who would become a first-round pick in 1981. Gwynn had started the baseball season late in 1981, as the basketball team was still competing, and some scouts had already seen enough of Meacham and stopped following SDSU. Also on the Aztecs baseball team was Casey McKeon, son of Jack McKeon, who was the San Diego Padres general manager at the time. Given his son's involvement, McKeon often went to Aztec games. He was initially interested in seeing Meacham but became more impressed by Gwynn after seeing him at an exhibition game between the Aztecs and Padres; Gwynn had re-joined the baseball team five days earlier.

== Professional career ==
=== Draft and minor leagues (1981–1982) ===
The Padres selected Gwynn in the third round of the 1981 MLB draft with the 58th pick. The Padres scout credited for discovering Gwynn was Cliff Ditto from the Los Angeles area; his scouting report was the only one the Padres had for Gwynn. The Houston Astros had also scouted Gwynn and wanted to select him, but since the team had no picks in the first two rounds, their first possible chance was in the third round after the Padres' third-round pick when Gwynn was taken. He had attended Padres games while he was at San Diego State and thought they had the "ugliest uniforms I've ever seen in my life." Those uniforms again came to his mind after he was drafted. McKeon had wanted to take Gwynn with the Padres' first pick, but they chose two other players in the first round and another in the second. McKeon threatened to walk out of the draft room had San Diego not selected him in the third. Later that day, Gwynn was also selected by the San Diego Clippers in the 10th round of the NBA draft. According to then-Clippers general manager Ted Podleski, Gwynn might have gone as high as the sixth round if he was not a baseball player. Gwynn chose to play baseball with the Padres in what he termed a "practical" decision, citing his physical battles pushing and fighting against larger players, such as Charles Bradley, while playing WAC basketball.

Coming out of college, Gwynn was initially worried about the transition from using an aluminum bat to a wooden one, but his concerns were allayed once he found a bat comparable to the size he had used with the Aztecs. He led the Northwest League with a .331 batting average, and added 12 homers and 17 stolen bases in just 42 games for the Walla Walla Padres, San Diego's Class A minor league affiliate, earning him the league's most valuable player (MVP) award in 1981. In his professional debut on Opening Day, Gwynn went 3-for-5 with a triple, a walk, two steals, two runs, and a strikeout. His salary in Walla Walla was $500 per month. In the summer of 1981, Gwynn was promoted to the Padres' Reno affiliate but was unable to travel there due to the ongoing air traffic controller strike, so he got sent to Amarillo instead. He finished the season in Class AA with the Amarillo Gold Sox for 23 games, while batting .462.

=== San Diego Padres (1982–2001) ===
==== 1982–1983 ====
Gwynn participated at spring training with San Diego in 1982 and hit .375. However, the Padres were set in the outfield with veterans Gene Richards, Ruppert Jones, and Sixto Lezcano, and Gwynn began the season with the Hawaii Islanders of Triple-A. He was batting .328 in 93 games with the Islanders when he was promoted and debuted for the Padres on July 19, 1982. He started in center field against the Philadelphia Phillies in place of a slumping Jones. In his fourth at-bat, Gwynn got his first major league hit—a double—against reliever Sid Monge. Pete Rose, the Phillies' first baseman who later became the major-league all-time hit leader, told Gwynn, "Congratulations. Don't catch me in one night." Five weeks later against Pittsburgh, Gwynn injured his left wrist after diving for a ball and hitting the hard artificial turf at Three Rivers Stadium, and missed three weeks while on the disabled list (DL). He finished his rookie season batting .289 in 54 games, the only season he hit below .300. His 15-game hitting streak was the longest on the team that season.

Gwynn reinjured his wrist playing winter ball in Puerto Rico and started 1983 on the DL. He missed the first two months of the season and struggled after his return. His average fell as low as .229 by July 29. He asked his wife to record the games before a road trip, and he began using video recording to review his at-bats. After looking at the tapes and correcting his swing during batting practice, Gwynn became a believer in using video. He said video "turned around my career". He heated up to a .309 average for his shortened season, and his 25-game hitting streak set a Padres record. For the second straight season, San Diego finished with a .500 record.

==== 1984–1986 ====
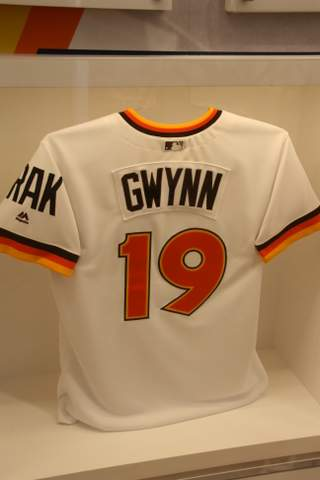
A post-2001 recreation of Gwynn's jersey in 1984, when the Padres won their first pennant

1984 headshot of Gwynn

In his first full season in 1984, San Diego won their first NL West title. Gwynn was elected to start in his first All-Star Game, and he won his first batting title with a .351 average along with 71 RBIs, and 33 stolen bases; he had only 23 strikeouts in 606 at-bats. He finished third in the balloting for the National League MVP behind Chicago Cubs winner Ryne Sandberg and runner-up Keith Hernandez of the New York Mets. He had 213 hits, breaking the Padres record of 194 set by Gene Richards in 1980. Gwynn hit second in the Padres batting order behind Alan Wiggins, and benefited from the higher number of fastballs opposing pitchers threw in response to the speedy leadoff hitter (70 SB) being on base. Wiggins' speed also disrupted the defense and opened up holes that Gwynn was able to exploit for hits. He hit above .400 when Wiggins was on base ahead of him. "Anybody can hit a fastball", said Gwynn. The duo was one of the biggest reasons behind San Diego's success. They could score fast with Wiggins getting on first, stealing second, and Gwynn singling him home. Gwynn batted .410 with runners in scoring position, and manager Dick Williams said his records indicated that Gwynn had the best "RBI percentage" on the team.

In the playoffs, the Padres won the first NL pennant in its team history, defeating the Cubs in the National League Championship Series (NLCS) before losing the World Series to the Detroit Tigers. Gwynn batted .368 in the NLCS, and his one-out single in the bottom of the ninth in Game 4 set up Steve Garvey's game-winning homer. Gwynn hit .263 (5-for-19) in the World Series, and flied out to Tigers left fielder Larry Herndon for the final out of the fall classic. During the offseason, Gwynn took less money to stay in San Diego by signing a six-year, $4.6 million contract with the Padres. Still, his new salary of more than $500,000 salary for 1985 represented a sizable raise over the $180,000 he would have received, or the $100,000 he had received in 1984.

Wiggins entered drug rehab in 1985 and was traded later in the season to the Baltimore Orioles, resulting in Gwynn seeing fewer fastballs and more breaking balls. Gwynn said it took him a month to realize the opponents' strategy change and a while to adjust. His average was under .300 into June when he got hot but then sprained his wrist on June 27 in a collision with Dodgers catcher Mike Scioscia. Still, Gwynn was named with seven other Padres to the 1985 All-Star Game. San Diego then led the NL West but finished the season in third place. After Gwynn's wrist healed, he hit .339 after the start of August and finished the season with the fourth-highest average in the NL (.317). Without an adequate replacement for Wiggins batting leadoff, his RBIs fell to 46.

Gwynn played a career-high 160 games in 1986, when he led NL position players in Wins Above Replacement (WAR). He scored 100 runs for the first time and tied for the NL lead (107). He set then-career highs for doubles (33), homers (14), and steals (37). On September 20 against the Houston Astros, he had four hits and became the fifth NL player that century with five stolen bases in a game. He finished third in hitting (.329) after leading for most of the season. He hit only .296 in September, and he regretted paying too much attention to Tim Raines and Steve Sax, who were previously trailing him. Gwynn won his first Gold Glove after leading the league in total chances and putouts (337). His 19 outfield assists that year—one short of the league-high—were highlighted by the three Mets he threw out in one game.

==== 1987–1989 ====
Despite his financial problems and bankruptcy in 1987, Gwynn remained unfazed on the field. In the Padres' home opener, Marvell Wynne, Gwynn, and John Kruk hit back-to-back-to-back homers to start the game for San Diego, the first time an MLB team had led off a game with three consecutive home runs. In June, he had 44 hits in 93 at-bats for a .473 average, the best month in his career. He finished fifth among NL outfielders voting for the All-Star Game, which Padres manager Larry Bowa called "a joke". However, Gwynn was unperturbed: "People put a premium on the home-run hitters. I know what I am. I'm a contact hitter and not a home-run hitter ... I'm not going to try to be something I'm not."

That year, Gwynn had two five-hit games, the first of eight in his career. He won his second batting title that season after hitting .370. It was the highest average in the NL since Stan Musial hit .376 in 1948. He also stole 56 bases and became the first NL player to hit .370 and steal 50 bases. (Note: Other major leaguers include George Sisler, Ty Cobb, Tris Speaker, and Benny Kauff.) Gwynn never went more than eight at-bats without recording a hit, and he had a hit in 82 percent of the 155 games he batted. His 218 hits also led the league. He led the league in WAR, and was second in stolen bases, triples (13), and on-base percentage (OBP) (.447); he also ranked fourth in runs scored (119) and 10th in walks with a career-high 82. His average, hits, runs, and triples were all Padre records. Although he only hit seven homers, Gwynn was second in the league with 26 intentional walks. He finished eighth in the voting for NL MVP but resisted altering his hitting style to hit more home runs to earn more respect. The same year, Wade Boggs in the American League (AL) won his fourth batting title in five years, hitting .363 with 24 home runs, but finished ninth in MVP voting. Fox Sports baseball writer Rob Neyer believes that Gwynn may have been MLB's best player during his 1987 season, and sportswriter Joe Posnanski called Gwynn's 1987 season "otherworldly" while opining that "he probably should have won the MVP award".

During the last three months of the 1987 season, a finger on Gwynn's left hand would lock when he gripped a bat. It would open barely enough for the bat to slip out of his grip. He had surgery on the hand during spring training the following season. Early in 1988, Gwynn was on the DL for 21 days after spraining his thumb after tripping rounding first base in Pittsburgh. He hit .246 as late as July 2, 1988, but won the batting title with a .313 average. Gwynn batted .406 in July and .367 in the last 73 games of the season. He denied that injuries impacted his hitting, instead attributing his struggles to "mechanics". He struck out a career-high 40 times that season, while his .313 average was the lowest to win a title in NL history. In the 112 years before, only nine batting leaders hit below .330, the previous low being Larry Doyle's .320 in 1915. For the 25 years ending in 1988, batting leaders averaged .343. Gwynn hit 119 points higher with runners on base (.382) than with the bases empty (.263), the largest differential in the NL that season. He tied Pedro Guerrero for the highest average with runners in scoring position (.371). (Note: Baseball-Reference.com lists his average in scoring position as .371, not .382 as in Men at Work. .382 was his average with runners on base.) During the season, McKeon replaced Bowa as Padres manager and moved Gwynn from right to center field. Gwynn also reached 1,000 career hits on April 22 with a single off Nolan Ryan of the Astros. On September 17, he passed Dave Winfield as the Padres' career leader in hits with his 1,135th off Jim Acker of the Atlanta Braves.

In the 1989 season, he was hurting in September while in the race for another batting title. His right toe made it hard for him to put a shoe on, and his left Achilles tendon was sore, preventing him from pushing off properly when swinging. His batting average dropped, but he insisted on playing until his manager forced him to sit out for two games. The Padres were battling the San Francisco Giants for the division title in September, but they were eliminated from contention the game before hosting a season-ending three-game series with the Giants. Although the race for the division was over, Gwynn was still trailing San Francisco's Will Clark for the batting title, .333 to .332. Gwynn went 3-for-4 in the last two games, finishing at .336 to claim his third title. "I lost to the best", Clark said. Gwynn became the first NL player to win three consecutive batting titles since Musial (1950–1952). In December 1989, Gwynn fell to being the seventh-highest-paid Padre at $1 million a year and questioned the team's salary structure. He felt he deserved more money than players like Jack Clark, who signed a lucrative deal with the New York Yankees before being traded to San Diego. Gwynn's request for a contract renegotiation was denied.

==== 1990–1992 ====
Gwynn in 1990 was accused by some teammates of being selfish and caring more about his batting average than winning. First baseman Jack Clark, most notably, stated that Gwynn should be swinging with runners in scoring position instead of bunting and protecting his batting average. Clark did not approve of Gwynn bunting with runners on first and second with nobody out, believing he was trying to either bunt for a hit or get credit for a sacrifice if he failed. On the other hand, Gwynn felt he was advancing runners for the team's "game changers"—Clark and Joe Carter—which was consistent with McKeon's style. Gwynn said he resorted to bunting to advance the runners because he was not a good pull hitter. "No one bothers Tony Gwynn because he wins batting titles, but the Padres finish fourth or fifth every year", said Clark, who also stirred controversy on his prior teams. Teammates Mike Pagliarulo and Garry Templeton sided with Clark, who also said Gwynn was "50 pounds [23 kg] overweight", leading to his lower stolen base total.

Stung by the criticism, Gwynn was miserable the rest of the season and became withdrawn and distrustful among his teammates. Conscious of being perceived as selfish, he altered his hitting style by attempting to pull the ball to move runners in situations where he would normally hit to the opposite field. Rumors that he might be traded affected his play. In September, Gwynn was upset when a figurine of his likeness was hanging in effigy in the Padres' dugout, and race became an issue due to the undercurrent of lynchings being evoked with Gwynn being African-American and Clark being Caucasian. The Padres said a groundskeeper was responsible, but Gwynn believed it was a cover-up. Clark denied any involvement. After breaking his right index finger mid-month in Atlanta while trying to make a catch at the wall, Gwynn missed the final 19 games of the season. He left the team for the season to avoid contact with the media and teammates. He was further upset that neither management nor other teammates came to his defense at the time. He later regretted saying he wanted to avoid his teammates in general instead of being more specific which ones he was referring to. "It just involved one great guy, and that's Tony Gwynn, and anything they want to say about Tony Gwynn is going to be news. It got all blown out of proportion", Carter said. Gwynn countered, "I've been doing the same things my whole career, playing the same way. Now, why is it an issue? Because Jack Clark says it is." Gwynn finished the season batting .309, ranking sixth in the league but the lowest average of any full season in his career; (Note: Limited to seasons where Gwynn played 100 games or more.) he had entered the season with a .332 career average. However, his 72RBI that season were a then-career high. He also began experiencing soreness and swelling in his left knee. The cartilage under his kneecap was wearing out, which doctors attributed to his playing basketball and baseball year-round for seven years from high school through college.

Gwynn and Clark said they could continue to play together, but Clark signed with the Boston Red Sox as a free agent in the offseason. Gwynn felt appreciated after he was signed to a three-year contract extension for $12.25 million, including a $1 million signing bonus. McKeon praised Gwynn, saying, "He's one of the most unselfish players I've ever managed. In '89, when he was going for a batting title, he was giving himself up to move runners along." Dick Williams, who managed Gwynn from 1982 through 1985, said of Gwynn, "I don't think I've ever had a player who worked harder, cared more and was more deserving of his awards." Clark continued criticizing him, which Gwynn attributed to jealousy. In response, Gwynn knocked Clark: "Let's talk about him walking 104 times, being a No. 4 hitter. Let's talk about his not flying on team flights. Let's talk about him getting booted out of games on a called strike three." In 1992, Gwynn sympathized with Clark, who filed for bankruptcy after bad loans by his agent. "I really appreciated the things Tony said about my situation", Clark said.

"People can say what they want to say about me. I know I've never driven in a lot of runs. That stat never has been that important to me. But who in this league is better at putting the bat on the ball? Nobody."

— Tony Gwynn, 1991

Gwynn, in 1991, passed Gene Richards as the Padres' all-time leader in steals and triples. He reached a season-high batting average of .373 in June, and late in the month was among the league leaders in RBIs. His left knee began causing him problems before the All-Star break, and he had been suffering from shin splints as well. He injured his left knee on August 5 at Houston while sliding into second base. He played through the injury, missing just one game over the next 3 1/2 weeks. He had fluid drained from his knee on August 31 and played just once in the week that followed while surgery was discussed. He attempted to finish the season but lasted just five more games. He underwent arthroscopic surgery to clean out the knee and smooth the articular cartilage, missing the final 21 games of the year. Gwynn led the league in hitting at .326 late in August and had enough plate appearances already to qualify for the title, when many people—including his father and Padres announcer Jerry Coleman—advised him to take care of his knee and secure another batting title. However, Gwynn was still reeling from Clark's criticism of his conditioning and selfishness and wanted to continue playing. Gwynn finished the season ranked third in batting at .317, behind Terry Pendleton (.319) and Hal Morris (.318). After the All-Star Game, he hit just .243.

In 1992, Gwynn ended the season on the DL for the third straight year. On September 8, in a 16-inning game in San Francisco, he had the third five-hit game of his career and his first since 1987. In the same game, he sprained the medial collateral ligament in his left knee and played just four more innings the rest of the season. He required arthroscopic surgery on the knee. Gwynn met Hall of Famer Ted Williams for the first time during the 1992 All-Star Game, which was hosted at San Diego Jack Murphy Stadium (known later as Qualcomm Stadium). At the time, Gwynn considered himself to be an accomplished hitter, content to hit singles and doubles. Williams called Gwynn "a big guy" and challenged him to hit for more power. He chided Gwynn for using a "toothpick" for a bat. His encounter with Williams spurred him to think more about hitting, and he began to hit for more power. "I've never been a home run guy, never been a big RBI guy, but from that point to the end of my career, I was much better at it", said Gwynn.

==== 1993–1997 ====
Gwynn entered the 1993 season anticipating that he would be better after his past two surgeries, and he had also incorporated Williams' advice into his swing. The Padres lost 101 games that year for the team's worst record during his career. They finished last in the division, behind even the Colorado Rockies, who were an expansion team in their inaugural season. San Diego that season had traded most of its star players—including Fred McGriff, Gary Sheffield, and Tony Fernández—in fire sales. Gwynn finished with a .358 average, the then-second best average of his career, but Colorado's Andrés Galarraga won the title at .370. Gwynn batted .587 on pulled balls, compared to his .315 in 1991 before Williams' pointers. He was affected early in the season by a sprained thumb, but he hit .400 (76-for-190) over the second half of the season. On June 10, Gwynn missed the opportunity to hit for the cycle when manager Jim Riggleman replaced him in the seventh inning of a 14–2 rout against the Dodgers after he had hit for a home run, double, and triple in his three prior at-bats. Riggleman was not aware that he needed a single to complete the cycle. Still wary of Clark's earlier criticism that he was selfish, Gwynn did not contest his removal, which angered his manager when he found out after the game. On August 4 against the Giants, Gwynn had the only six-hit game of his career. He might have gone 7–for–7 if not for an excellent play at first base by Will Clark. Gwynn recorded his 2,000th hit with a single off Colorado lefthander Bruce Ruffin on August 6. His last game was September 5 before undergoing arthroscopic surgery to clear "loose bodies" from his knee. It was the fourth consecutive year his season ended early, and the third straight season it was due to left knee surgery.

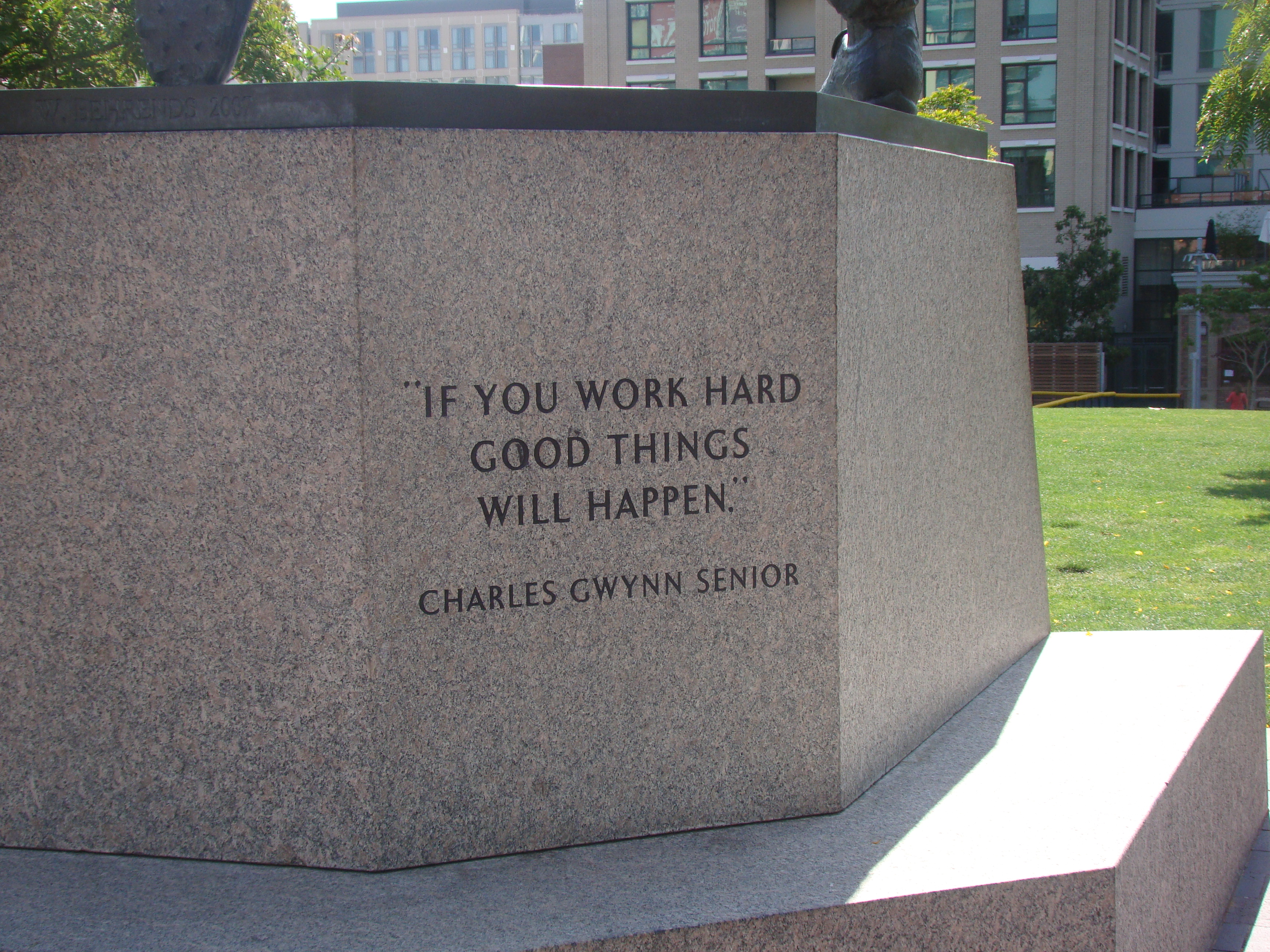
Inscription "If you work hard good things will happen" by Charles Gwynn, Tony Gwynn's father

After the season, Gwynn's father, Charles, died of heart problems at the age of 57. Two days earlier, Charles had argued with Gwynn that he should leave San Diego, questioning the Padres' commitment to winning. Gwynn eventually concluded, "No, I like it here, I should stay." He contemplated leaving baseball after his father's death; however, he recalled his father always telling him to "never be a quitter, work hard".

For years during Gwynn's career, media preseason predictions declared that "this season" he would become the first player to hit .400 since Williams in 1941. Relatively healthy in 1994, Gwynn batted .394, his career-high and the highest in the National League since Bill Terry hit .401 in 1930. He also had a league-leading .454 OBP. From April 22 through the 24 against Philadelphia, he had eight consecutive hits and reached base nine straight times, tying Padres records held by Winfield and Bip Roberts, respectively. Gwynn was batting .383 at the All-Star break; however, talk of a strike by the Major League Baseball Players Association (MLBPA) was looming, and he wanted to get to .400 before that date. At the 1994 All-Star Game in front of the national television audience, Gwynn scored the game-winning walk-off run for the NL during the bottom of the 10th inning to seal the 8–7 victory, sliding into home plate from first base to barely beat the throw and tag following a Moises Alou double. He hit .423 over 28 games in the second half, and heated up to .475 through 10 games in August, when the season ended prematurely on August 11 due to the baseball strike. He was 6-for-9 in the last two games and 3-for-5 in the eventual finale, falling short of batting .400 by three hits. Fans were awaiting an end to the strike and for Gwynn to resume his quest for .400, but hopes of the season restarting were dashed when the World Series was canceled. He later commented, "I'm not unhappy or bitter that the strike came. I look at it this way: I would have sooner fell short due to the strike than if I would have hit .400 and then the strike came. Then people would have thought I would have collapsed down the stretch, instead of being at .390 when the strike came and being so close." That year, Gwynn pulled the ball with greater regularity. He was 10th in the league with a slugging percentage of .568, which was also his career-high. His 12 homers in 419 at-bats was a higher rate than in 1986, when he hit a then-career high 14 homers in 642 at-bats. He won another batting title (.368) in 1995. For the second straight year, he did not go longer than two games without a hit. He led the NL in batting with runners in scoring position (.394), and he had a then-career high 90 RBI. Gwynn hit in 15 straight games in July, his longest hitting streak since his 18-game run in 1988. He hit 28-for-65 (.431) with 15 RBI during the streak. Although he missed batting .400 in 1994, he batted .403 during a 179-game stretch between July 3, 1993, and May 9, 1995.

In 1996, the Padres won the division with 91 wins and returned to the playoffs for the first time in 12 years. Gwynn called it the worst injury season of his career. His hurt heel in April was diagnosed as an inflamed bursa sac. He tried multiple shoes to alleviate the pain, and was on the DL for a month at midseason. He played the rest of the year in pain, and surgery after the season revealed a 40 percent tear (or fraying) at the top of his right Achilles' tendon. On September 28, Gwynn hit a patented single between third base and shortstop to score two runs and break a 2–2 tie in the eighth against the Dodgers, clinching a playoff berth for the Padres. He called it his most memorable regular-season hit until his 3,000th career hit. Gwynn's brother, Chris, also played for San Diego that season and hit the game-winner in the season finale in extra innings, completing a three-game sweep over Los Angeles to win the division. Chris had only hit .169 entering the game, and some fans were convinced that he was on the team only because of his brother. Earlier in the week, Gwynn had criticized fans for booing his brother. "Today, I'm just Chris Gwynn's anonymous brother," said Gwynn, who also won his seventh batting title that day. Although he was four plate appearances (PAs) short of the minimum to qualify for the title, MLB Rule 10.22(a)—which also came to be known as the Tony Gwynn rule—allowed hitless at-bats to be added to his record to qualify. Gwynn, who batted .353 in 498 PAs, would have dropped to .349 with the extra at-bats, still five points better than second-place Ellis Burks' .344. In the postseason, the Padres were swept by the St. Louis Cardinals in the opening round.

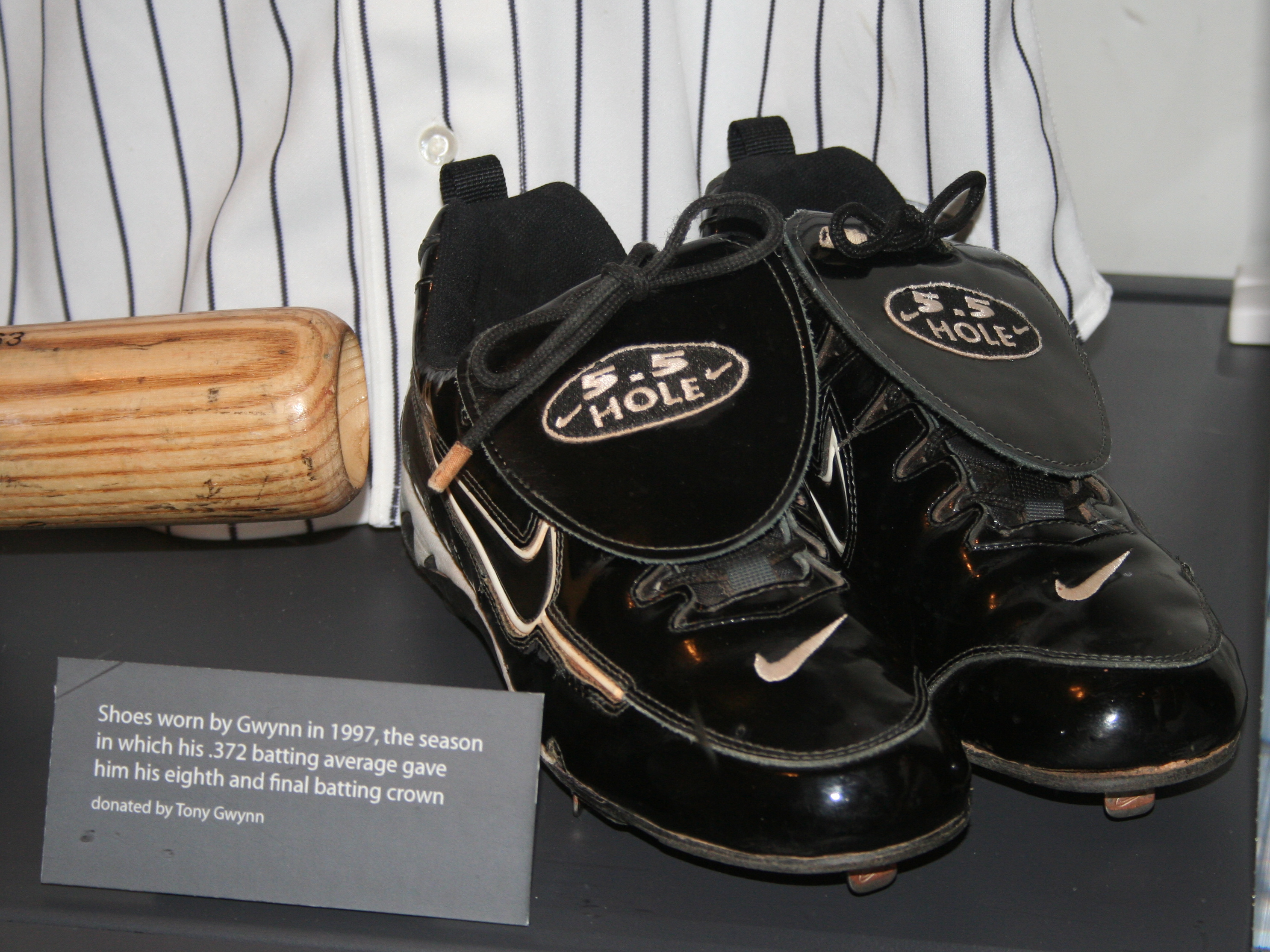
Shoes worn by Gwynn in 1997, when he batted .372

In April 1997, Gwynn signed a three-year contract extension for $12.6 million. Recovered from his Achilles problem the year before, he was able to plant his front foot to pull inside pitches. That season, Gwynn reached career highs with 17 home runs and 119 RBIs. He batted .372 for his eighth batting title, second only to Ty Cobb (12). He led the NL in hits for the seventh time, tying Rose's record. The 220 hits led the majors and was a new team record. Gwynn led the majors with a .459 average with runners in scoring position. In his 16th season, he became the oldest major leaguer at age 37 to reach 100 RBIs for the first time. His RBI total was the second-highest in club history. He also hit a Padres record of 49 doubles, ranking second in the league, and established a career-best of 324 total bases. On June 7, Gwynn hit his 100th career home run off of Donne Wall of Houston, becoming the third Padre to reach the mark. He was batting .402 on July 14, the latest in the season he had ever been at .400. However, his average tailed off as he suffered from kidney stones later in the month, and he also battled problems with his left knee that required postseason surgery.

==== 1998–2001 ====
In 1998, Gwynn batted .321 and helped the Padres win a franchise-record 98 games and their second pennant. He began the year with his first-ever opening-day home run, and continued his trend of hitting for more power with 16 homers for the season. The Padres reached the World Series in 1998 after defeating Houston and Atlanta in the playoffs. However, the Padres lost to the Yankees in a four-game sweep, despite Gwynn hitting .500 (8-for-16) in the series; the rest of the team batted only .203. Gwynn hit a two-run home run off the second-deck facade in the opening game at Yankee Stadium against pitcher David Wells, which he called his favorite hit and highlight of his career. "That's the biggest game in the world, a World Series game. And the fact that it was in New York in Yankee Stadium. I'll remember that forever", he proclaimed.

Calf injuries forced Gwynn to miss 44 games in the first half of 1999. At the 1999 All-Star Game at Fenway Park in Boston, he escorted Williams to the mound, and steadied his friend in throwing out the ceremonial first pitch. It was Gwynn's most memorable All-Star moment in his career. As he approached 3,000 career hits in July, two unidentified Padres said there was too much focus on reaching the milestone. Additionally, Jim Leyritz, after being traded from the Padres to the Yankees, said Gwynn lacked the "intangibles" of a team player. In the next game in San Diego, Padres fans gave Gwynn a standing ovation after he was removed for a pinch runner following his 2,994th hit. He approached 3,000 hits on the road, first playing in a series against the Cardinals. On August 4, he collected three hits, including a grand slam, to reach 2,998 hits, receiving a standing ovation from the St. Louis crowd after each hit. The following day, Gwynn collected hit number 2,999 in the same game that the Cardinals' Mark McGwire hit his 500th home run. Gwynn got his 3,000th hit on August 6 with a single in the first inning off Montreal Expos pitcher Dan Smith. He had four hits in the game. His 2,000th hit was also on August 6, which is also the birthday of Gwynn's mother. He was the 11th player to collect all 3,000 hits with one team. George Brett of the Kansas City Royals and Robin Yount of the Milwaukee Brewers had been last to achieve the milestone with a single team in 1992. Gwynn's chase was prolonged by a left calf injury that season which sent him to the DL twice, forcing him to miss 44 games. He reached 3,000 in 2,284 games, the third-fewest games among the 22 players to reach the mark behind Ty Cobb (2,135) and Nap Lajoie (2,224). No player born after 1900 got there in fewer games or at-bats (8,874) than Gwynn.

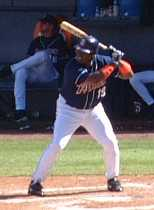
Gwynn in 2001

Gwynn, who turned 40 in 2000, had a left knee injury that required his knee to be drained seven times before he underwent season-ending surgery. He was limited to playing just 36 of the Padres' first 71 games, and he started only 26 games in right field. He batted .408 from May 19 to June 23 to raise his average from .196 and finish the season at .323. Gwynn had microfracture surgery performed on his knee, which involved tiny holes being created to promote cartilage growth.

The Padres bought out their $6 million option on Gwynn for 2001, paying him $2 million instead, and he became a free agent for the first time. Gwynn received offers from a few different teams, and he was pressured by his son Tony Jr. to sign with a team that had a strong chance of winning a World Series championship, which included the Cleveland Indians. After weeks of negotiation that were at times bitter, Gwynn re-signed with the Padres for 2001, agreeing to a one-year, $2 million contract with a chance to earn another $3.7 million in performance incentives. However, he was hampered that season by problems to his right leg, which had been his "good leg", and was limited to just 17 games on the field. In the first half of the season, he missed 64 games due to a right hamstring that resulted in two stints on the DL. After returning, he began having problems with his right knee. He was limited to pinch-hitting duties and started only one game after mid-July due to a torn meniscus in the right knee. Gwynn formally announced on June 28 that he would retire at the end of the season, and subsequently received an ovation at each stadium the Padres visited. He was honored as a non-playing squad member at the 2001 All-Star Game. During the game, he and Cal Ripken, who had announced his retirement nine days before Gwynn, were presented the Commissioner's Historic Achievement Award by Commissioner Bud Selig. On October 6, 2001, at Qualcomm Stadium, Gwynn had a pinch-hit RBI double off Gabe White of Colorado for the final hit of his career. He considered starting the next day in the final game of the season, but he was not confident he could handle a fly ball. In his final appearance, he pinch hit in the ninth inning, grounding out to shortstop; earlier in the same game, teammate Rickey Henderson joined Gwynn in the 3,000 hit club. Although he was limited to only 112 plate appearances, Gwynn finished the season with a .324 average, his 19th consecutive season batting at least .300.

== Player profile ==
=== Batting style ===
Gwynn was an aggressive hitter who was able to expand his hitting zone and frequently hit bad balls that were out of the strike zone. He rarely struck out and generally did not draw many walks. His philosophy was to "see the ball and react". He was less concerned with getting a hit in a particular at-bat and was more focused with being comfortable at the plate, having a fluid swing, and making solid contact. Over the course of the season, he figured it would result in success. Gwynn was known for his pitch recognition and ability to adjust his hitting based on defensive alignments, using his peripheral vision to anticipate plays. He would identify gaps in the defense based on where fielders were positioned, and then wait for a pitch which allowed him to hit the ball where he wanted. Gwynn particularly enjoyed hitting with a runner on first base because it meant the second baseman or shortstop had to play closer to second base to prepare for a double play or stolen base attempt, thereby opening a larger gap between infielders that Gwynn was more easily able to exploit. Gwynn's eye and pitch recognition also contributed to a low amount of times being hit by a pitch in his career (24) because he was usually able to dodge incoming pitches quickly enough.

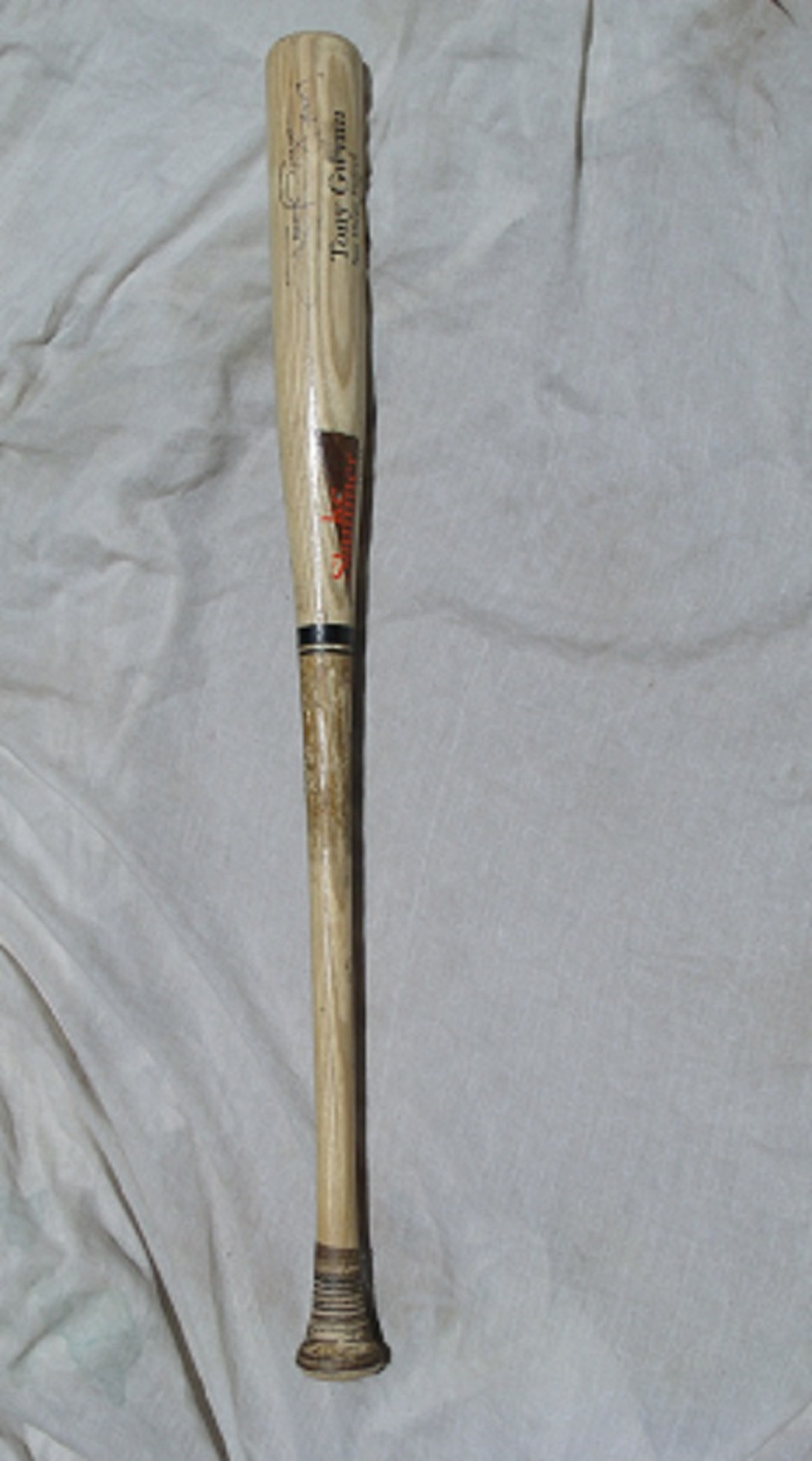
A Gwynn game-used and autographed bat

Among Gwynn's primary strengths was his patience in allowing the ball to reach the strike zone before starting his swing. His bats were as small as anyone used during his career, and their lightness allowed him to wait longer before committing to his swing; he was rarely fooled by a pitch. According to Adam Dunn, Gwynn was the only left-handed batter who could successfully hit Hall of Fame pitcher Randy Johnson's slider. Gwynn started with a 34-inch (86 cm), 32-ounce (910 g) aluminum bat in college. As a junior, he had to replace it after it got dented, and came across a 32-inch (81 cm), 31-ounce (880 g) model that was more to his liking. At his first minor league stop at Walla Walla, the shortest bat they had was 34 inches (86 cm). To Gwynn's surprise, he uncharacteristically started hitting home runs. On their first road trip to Eugene, Oregon, he acquired a couple of 32-inch (81 cm) bats that he could better handle. In the first 12 years of his MLB career, Gwynn used a 32 1/2-inch (83 cm), 31-ounce (880 g) bat. In his final eight years, he employed a 33-inch (84 cm), 30 1/2-ounce (860 g) bat, (Note: In comparison, slugger Babe Ruth used bats ranging 44–52 ounces (1,200–1,500 g). Ernie Banks hit 512 career home runs using a 32-ounce (910 g) bat.) adding the 1/2 inch (1.3 cm) to improve his coverage on the outside of the plate. Gwynn's preferred bat material was wide-grain ash wood. He wanted his wooden bats light like his aluminum ones in college. Instead of having the barrel of his bats shaved, as many batters do, he had them "cupped", with the end of the barrel hollowed out like the bottom of a wine bottle. His small hands required that he use thin-handled bats. His bat control made him a good hit-and-run batter, although some former teammates complained he would swing for a hit even when a player was trying to steal, depriving his teammate of a stolen base.

"Sometimes hitters can pick up differences in spin. They can identify pitches if there are different release points…But if a pitcher can change speeds, every hitter is helpless, limited by human vision. Except for that [expletive] Tony Gwynn."

— Greg Maddux, Hall of Fame pitcher

Gwynn was able to hit the ball to all fields, but liked to hit balls the opposite way to the left, between third base and shortstop. He dubbed it the "5.5 hole", since baseball scorekeeping designates third base using a 5 and shortstop with a 6. Gwynn preferred an outside pitch, waiting as long as possible and using his strong wrists to quickly hit the ball. He was not considered a home run hitter, reaching double-figures just five times, but he was a gap hitter with power to drive hits between outfielders. Opposing outfielders typically played him deep. Gwynn became a complete hitter after following Ted Willams' advice to drive inside pitches instead of finessing them, which Gwynn learned he could do without sacrificing his average. He initially thought that home runs were "boring", and he concentrated on his craft of making contact. However, Williams said Gwynn was "wasting an opportunity", and convinced him to turn on inside fastballs more and capitalize on his strength and power pitchers pitching him inside. Applying Williams' approach, Gwynn employed the entire field, and was no longer satisfied with mostly hitting to left field. His home runs increased, and he drove in more runs. Forty-three of his 135 career home runs were in his final three full seasons (1997–1999). Gwynn credited his later improvement to Williams and his book The Science of Hitting, which he said that he read "four or five times a year". He and Williams became friends, and they often talked for hours about hitting. Gwynn lamented not having met Williams earlier and possibly adjusting his hitting approach sooner. Gary Sheffield, who was traded to the Padres in 1992, credited Gwynn's hitting instruction for raising his season batting average to .330 (up from a previous high of .294) and hence winning a batting title over his teammate Gwynn that year.

=== Physique ===
Gwynn's physical appearance belied his athleticism. He stood 5 feet 11 inches (1.80 m), thick around the middle and thighs. His weight was listed as 180 pounds (82 kg) during his junior year of college, and 185 pounds (84 kg) when he was in the minor leagues in 1981. Even at his athletic prime when he could really run, he weighed around 200 pounds (91 kg) and was considered pudgy. His roly-poly frame was a self-described "body by Betty Crocker", a reference to the food product brand. Towards the end of his breakout season in 1984, he conceded that his "extra weight hasn't helped me. My bat's slower than it has been all year." At the time, he attributed his weight gain to soft drinks: "It's killing me. It's always been a weakness. I've gotta cut down on the soda pop." Jim Murray of the Los Angeles Times opined in 1993 that Gwynn's "deceptive" looks and failing to "look the part" contributed to his regularly being overlooked in the voting for league MVP.

Gwynn was sensitive about his weight, sometimes getting angry when a reporter discussed or asked about it. His knee injuries over his career prompted the Padres organization, media, and fans to question his weight, conditioning, and eating habits. However, he rejected the notion that his weight led to his injuries. Gwynn contended that his weight was only a topic when he was struggling, and not when he was performing. He also believed that the criticism stemmed mainly from his not fitting people's profile of what an athlete should look like. He said he had "a football player's body", with his father, grandfather and brothers also being big. Gwynn said his hitting style put a lot of torque on his knees. He started experiencing problems with his legs in 1986, when he suffered from shin splints. In his career, he had 13 operations, including eight involving his knees. Padres hitting coach Merv Rettenmund blamed the fields at Three Rivers Stadium in Pittsburgh, Veterans Stadium in Philadelphia, and Riverfront Stadium in Cincinnati (which he said were "like cement") for causing extreme swelling on Gwynn's left knee which necessitated draining gallons of cartilage liquid. Citing discussions with people in the sports medical community, San Diego sportswriter Tom Krasovic believed that the health problems on Gwynn's legs caused by the heavy bodyweight load were an obstacle to greater success; Krasovic posited that if Gwynn had sustained his lower early career weight, he would've challenged Pete Rose's career hits record. Limited by injuries, he played over 135 games just once in his final 11 seasons. Towards the end of his career, Gwynn had to have his knee drained twice per week to be in a condition to play. Gwynn used to run a great deal to keep in shape, but his last five years were mostly limited to working out in the gym. His actual weight is generally thought to have been under-reported during the latter part of his career, when it was officially listed between 215 and 220 pounds (98–100 kg).

=== Base stealing and fielding ===
Gwynn was a leading base stealer in the first half of his career. He was also able to hit triples, reaching double figures four times. As he became slower in later years while his body grew and his injuries mounted, Gwynn would anticipate pitchers' moves and would sometimes steal bases by breaking for second base before the pitcher started delivering the ball to the hitter. Defensively, he improved considerably and was among the best right fielders at quickly going to the line, cutting the ball off, and throwing to second base. He worked on his defense, constantly checking right field walls in ballparks to study how balls bounced off them. His running ability also helped him on defense. When he entered the majors, Gwynn was not a very good right fielder nor an accurate thrower; in college, he could not even throw the ball from center field to second base without it hopping first. Dave Dravecky, Gwynn's teammate in the Padres minor league farm system, said that when Gwynn began his tenure with the Double-A Amarillo Gold Sox, he had "some of the worst throwing mechanics I have ever seen", and that "his throws from the outfield were limp balloons." For a long time, he worked on his defense harder than he did his hitting. Early on in Gwynn's major league tenure, Clyde McCullough coached Gwynn on fielding every night to strengthen his arm; McCullough repeatedly had Gwynn practice picking up the ball in right field and throwing it to second base. Pitching coach Tom House taught Gwynn the proper grip and throwing motion, and Rob Picciolo hit several ground balls and fly balls to Gwynn. While with the Padres, Gwynn returned to SDSU in the fall every offseason to work on his fielding with an emphasis on foot positioning; he had the assistant coaches hit fly balls to him in the outfield, and he also fielded from the outfield during the team's live batting practice. He was most proud of his five Gold Gloves, calling his first one from 1986 his most treasured piece of memorabilia. He became a perennial leader in outfield assists. Although his arm was not particularly strong, Gwynn learned to use his body to build momentum into his throws.

=== Work ethic ===
Gwynn was hard-working and known for his work ethic and devotion to extra batting practice; on the day of a night game, Gwynn would commence batting practice at the ballpark in the early afternoon between twelve and two o'clock, and also do batting practice in the batting cage after the game. On the road, he stayed in his hotel room, studying video of his at-bats or playing video games. In an era before laptops and tablets, Gwynn bought his own video equipment and lugged it from town to town along with tapes of his games. His wife traveled with a Betamax video cassette recorder that was the size of a suitcase to tape his at-bats. Still, the Padres were the last MLB team to hire a video coordinator. Gwynn later invested in close to $100,000 in video equipment that he shared with his teammates. Few hitters were as meticulous as Gwynn with his detailed notebooks and videotape, which he spent hours studying. He studied pitchers, watching them in the bullpen and on television or video, to learn their tendencies on every count. Gwynn spent hours watching video and analyzing his swing frame by frame. He had one tape of each team, which included his at-bats against that team in the season. Gwynn also used video to scout umpires, studying the size and shape of each individual umpire's strike zone. "Tony taught me more about hitting than I ever taught him", said Merv Rettenmund, his hitting coach for nine years with the Padres. Gwynn was also not averse to lending advice to opponents, as Hall of Fame player Todd Helton remarked how Gwynn guided him during his second year with the Colorado Rockies, about the ideal way to look for the ball being thrown by the pitcher; similarly, after Gwynn's former teammate John Kruk was traded to the Philadelphia Phillies, when the Padres and Phillies faced each other and Gwynn reached base with the opportunity to chat with Kruk (who was the first baseman), Gwynn offered Kruk verbal scouting reports for new pitchers on Kruk's NL East divisional opponents. Gwynn was also involved in the Padres' front office affairs as a player; general manager Kevin Towers usually consulted Gwynn for input on potential trades, particularly regarding whether the incoming players' character would be a good fit for the team. In this capacity, Gwynn researched and interviewed people as necessary.

=== Personality ===
"He could meet somebody for five minutes and you'd think they'd been best friends for years."

— Kirk Kenney, sportswriter for the San Diego Union-Tribune

Gwynn was friendly and accessible to both the media and fans. Even on the occasions that he began an interview tight-lipped, he almost inevitably opened up and offered abundant material. He spoke with a twang in his high-pitched voice, often filled with loud, infectious, childlike laughter; Chris Berman of ESPN called Gwynn's laugh the "best sound I've ever heard in my life". Gwynn possessed a cheerful personality, being friendly towards others while being critical of himself. He considered himself "a good player ... but I knew my place. I was not a game-changer. I was not a dominant player". His demeanor was even-keeled; Rettenmund said, "You couldn't tell if [Gwynn had] gone 3-for-3 or 0-for-3." Gwynn disliked arrogant people, and was uncomfortable with receiving praise and flattery. Gwynn was unimpressed by other people's social standing, wealth, or fame; he received offers to appear on Jay Leno's talk show on several occasions and declined all of them. Another time, he was invited to a White House dinner with the President and personally didn't care to attend, only obliging at his wife Alicia's insistence because she really wanted to go. After his father died in 1993, Gwynn followed his advice and became more outspoken and more of a team leader.

=== Views on performance-enhancing drugs ===
"The steroid thing is very upsetting to me. I look back on my career with no regrets. I didn't do amphetamines or steroids. That there are guys who obviously did is unfair to those playing it straight. And it does put a new wrinkle on Hall of Fame consideration."

— Tony Gwynn, San Diego Magazine, December 2006, p. 136

In 1989, Gwynn first expressed his concerns regarding the increasing usage of performance-enhancing drugs (PEDs) in baseball with Bob Nightengale, the Padres reporter for the Los Angeles Times. In 1995 when very few in the baseball world were outspoken about the matter, Gwynn went public with his opposition to PEDs, and consequently received pushback for doing so from veteran players, including his own teammates. In 2003, Gwynn stated that half of position players in the league used amphetamines; this influenced MLB and the players' union to add "greenies" (a type of amphetamine) to their list of banned substances in 2005. In 2013, Gwynn also advocated harsher penalties for players caught using PEDs, saying that first-time offenders should have their contracts fully voided instead of merely receiving a 50-game suspension; he believed that such punishments would act as a deterrent to curb PED use around the league. Gwynn however, supported Mark McGwire's inclusion into the Hall of Fame, defending his stance with the rationale that the league had "no rules" regarding the use of PEDs throughout the late 1980s and early 1990s; he also said that McGwire "dominated an era" from an on-field standpoint.

== Legacy ==
"When the world's most talented people pass away, we celebrate their life's work. Steve Jobs had the personal computer, Thomas Edison the light bulb, Albert Einstein the theory of relativity, and Tony Gwynn the mechanically efficient swing. Publicly appreciating that which they were most passionate about and proud of is among the best ways to honor their legacies."

— Fox Sports

Gwynn was a 15-time All-Star, voted 11 times by fans to be a starter, the most by an NL outfielder, and tied with Reggie Jackson for the most among MLB outfielders. Gwynn accumulated 3,141 hits and a career batting average of .338, and hit .371 in two World Series. He was lauded for his artistry at the plate, and his Hall of Fame plaque refers to him as "an artisan with the bat". Jayson Stark labeled Gwynn as "the greatest bat artiste of his generation" and remarked that Gwynn achieving a .338 lifetime batting average during his era is "the equivalent of bicycling to the moon". Walter Leavy called Gwynn a "legendary artist", likening him to Pablo Picasso, and offered serious consideration of Gwynn as the greatest hitter ever. Jason Quick recalled that in an interview with Gwynn about hitting, the latter was "describing art in the most passionate and beautiful way possible…It was like hearing Picasso talk about art...And Maya Angelou about poetry." Tim Kurkjian referred to Gwynn as an artist and said "his bats were his magic brushes". David Jones stated Gwynn had "unmatched hitting prowess,” comparing it to the artistry of Wolfgang Amadeus Mozart and Claude Monet; Troy Renck said that when he encountered Gwynn practicing, "it was as if I had stumbled into the recording studio to find Mozart."

Gwynn has the highest adjusted batting average of all-time with .342. Barry Bonds, MLB's all-time home run leader, called Gwynn "the best hitter of my generation"; similar sentiments were echoed by Jayson Stark, The Oklahoman sportswriter Berry Tramel, The Holland Sentinel sportswriter Dan D'Addona, and Esquire news editor Ben Collins. The Associated Press called him "arguably the best pure hitter of his generation". Hall of Fame pitcher Greg Maddux, against whom Gwynn had more hits than any other pitcher, called him "the best pure hitter...Easily". (Note: Gwynn hit 39-for-94 (.415) with no strikeouts and seven intentional walks in his career against Maddux.) A 1997 Sports Illustrated cover declared Gwynn as "The Best Hitter Since Ted Williams".

Gwynn won eight NL batting titles, tying him with Honus Wagner for the league record— second to all-time major league leader Ty Cobb, who won 12 AL titles. Gwynn and Cobb are the only MLB players with two separate runs of three or more straight batting titles. Gwynn finished in the top 10 in batting for 15 consecutive seasons. From 1984 though 1997, Gwynn finished in the top five in all but one season (1990), when he missed it by one hit. He recorded five of the 14 highest season averages since Ted Williams hit .406 in 1941. Gwynn hit above .300 in an NL-record 19 consecutive seasons, exceeded only by Cobb (23). The only season Gwynn failed to bat .300 was his first, when he hit .289 in 54 games. Seven times he batted over .350, the most of any player since World War II. He was the fourth player in MLB history to hit above .350 for five consecutive years. (Note: Cobb (11 times, 1909–1919), Rogers Hornsby (6, 1920–1925), and Al Simmons (5, 1927–1931) achieved it before him.) During that span (1993–1997), which was preceded by his first meeting with Williams, Gwynn averaged .368 while leading the league each season except 1993, when he hit .358 to finish second. The four consecutive NL batting titles he won starting in 1994 had not been matched since Rogers Hornsby won six straight beginning in 1920. Gwynn is the only major leaguer to win four batting titles each in two separate decades, and he batted .351 over his final 10 seasons. Six times he led the NL in both batting average and hits in a season, and five times he reached the 200-hit milestone.

Gwynn placed in the top 10 in voting for the National League MVP seven times in his career, including his only top-five finish in 1984, when he ended up third. In 2005, Sporting News ranked Gwynn No. 57 on the list of their 100 Greatest Baseball Players, and he was nominated as a finalist for the Major League Baseball All-Century Team. In 2019, he was listed at No. 95 on writer Joe Posnanski's list of the 100 greatest baseball players, published by The Athletic. Using a methodology that combined "career WAR, Hall of Fame status, peak performance, and overall contributions to the game", ESPN ranked Gwynn No. 44 on its list of "Top 100 MLB players of all time" in 2022. Gwynn's significance is muted by the non-traditional measurements in sabermetrics, which tends to favor power and the ability to get on base over batting average. As of 2014, his career 65.0 WAR ranked 34th among outfielders, and a few above him had not yet been voted into the Hall of Fame. While he had an on-base percentage of .388, he was one of only four players to hit .335 or more who did not have career .400 OBP. During his career, he finished in the top-10 in the NL in OBP 10 times. Gwynn's run production was another rap against him. He exceeded 90 RBIs in a season just once, when he had 119 in 1997, but he batted .349 in his career with runners in scoring position. "He was devastating with runners in scoring position. Impossible", former player Eric Davis said.

Gwynn's .338 career average ranks 17th all-time. It is the highest of any player who began his career after World War II, and the highest since Williams retired in 1960 with a .344 career average. They are the only ones of the top-17 to play after 1938. Gwynn had the fourth-highest career average of any player with 3,000 hits, (Note: Cobb (.366), Tris Speaker (.345) and Nap Lajoie (.33820) ranked higher than Gwynn (.33818)) and the highest of anyone who was born after 1900. Ever since MLB began tracking the statistic in the early 1990s, Gwynn holds the highest two-strike batting average at .302, which is 40 points above second-place Wade Boggs with .262. Playing in an era when around 75 batters struck out 100 times in a season, Gwynn never struck out more than 40 times a year. He had eight seasons, including six consecutive, when he had fewer than 20 strikeouts. Ten times in his career he finished the season as the hardest player in the NL to strike out. Since 1975, Gwynn is one of only two players that batted .300 in a season while striking out at most once every 25 at-bats. (Note: Bill Buckner did it four times, while Gwynn had eight.) He struck out only 434 times in his whole career, which averaged out to just once every 21 at-bats, or 29 times per 162 games. He became more difficult to strike out later in his career, even as pitchers were growing bigger and stronger and throwing harder. He struck out three times in a game just once in his career, compared to his 297 career three-hit games. Gwynn is one of five players with more than 500 doubles and fewer than 500 strikeouts in their career and the only Hall of Famer since 1965 to finish his career with more doubles than strikeouts. (Note: Others include Paul Waner, Charlie Gehringer, Tris Speaker and Nap Lajoie.) He did not draw many walks, but drew more walks than strikeouts in every season but his rookie year. Though he was not considered a power hitter, opposing managers chose to intentionally walk him nonetheless. He drew 203 intentional passes during his career, which was 50 percent more than his career home run total.

On defense, Gwynn won five Gold Gloves in a six-year span. He stole 318 bases in his career, with a high of 56 and a four-year stretch when he averaged 40. Only four players in MLB history had 300 steals and a career batting average of at least .338; Gwynn was the only one of the four to have played since 1928. (Note: The others are Cobb, Lajoie, and Tris Speaker.) He was also just the 10th player to retire with over 3,000 hits and 300 steals. Gwynn in 1999 was the first National League player to reach 3,000 hits since Lou Brock in August 1979. Seven American Leaguers reached the mark after Brock and before Gwynn; all but one played at least 400 games as a designated hitter. An NL player could not be a DH until 1997, when it was allowed for the few interleague games that were played in AL parks. Just six of Gwynn's first 3,000 hits came as a designated hitter. "If you want to do it in the National League, you have to play a position", he said. "It's been 20 years since anybody has been able to do it. That tells you how tough it is to do it in this league."

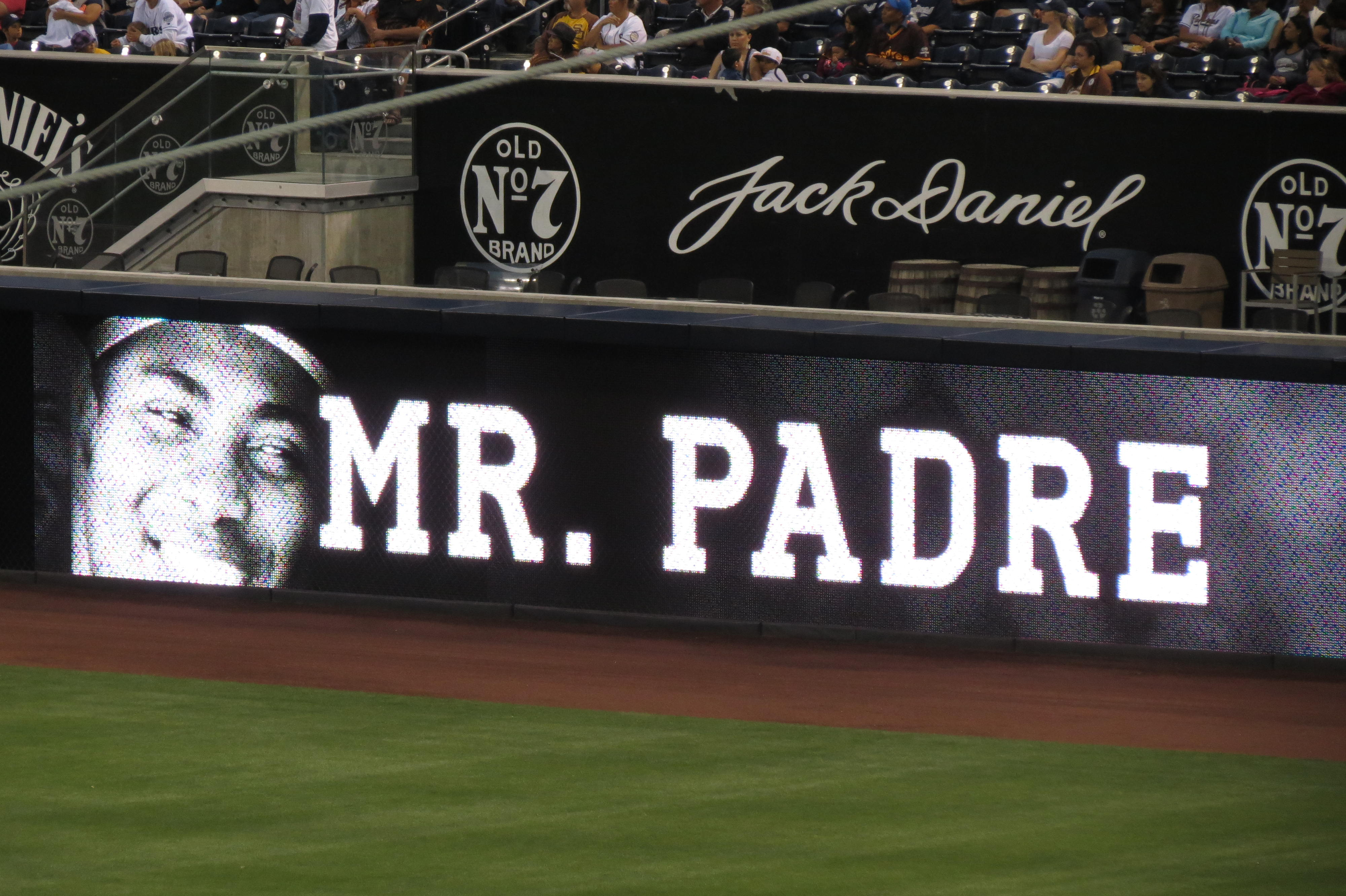
Gwynn was known as "Mr. Padre".

Gwynn played his entire career for San Diego, a rarity for his generation in an era of free agency, and earned the nickname "Mr. Padre". "In this era it doesn't happen. It takes a little bit of loyalty and luck. It also takes the organization wanting a player to stay with the club", said Gwynn. He regularly took less money to keep his family rooted in San Diego, which prompted criticism from the MLBPA for his setting a lower market value for other star hitters. Gwynn earned $47 million as player, but never received more than $6.3 million in a season, nor signed a contract valued over $12.25 million. Only 17 MLB players have played at least 20 seasons with one club. He is widely considered the greatest Padres player ever. "There's simply no bigger figure in baseball that San Diego's ever had", said former teammate Trevor Hoffman. The San Diego Union-Tribune placed Gwynn No. 1 in their 2014 ranking of the city's most influential sports figures. He eschewed the added fame that might have come from playing elsewhere, opting instead to stay with the small-market team that had just seven winning seasons and three playoff appearances during his two decades with them. Gwynn became a civic icon. "It's rare, and becoming rarer, that one man is so identified with a franchise and a city as Tony is with San Diego and the Padres", said political columnist and baseball writer George Will. Grantland called him "quite simply, one of the most beloved figures in the history of the city of San Diego."

Gwynn's career paralleled that of Wade Boggs, who also debuted in the major leagues in 1982. Gwynn and Boggs were the premier contact hitters in an era dominated by home runs. They both won multiple batting titles—Gwynn's eight to Boggs' five—and each won four straight to join Cobb, Hornsby, and Carew as the only players to do so. Gwynn and Boggs each hit over .350 in four straight seasons, the only players to do so since 1931. They joined Brock and Carew as the only players whose careers ended after World War II who finished with 3,000 hits and fewer than 160 home runs. Gwynn, though, had a career slugging percentage of .459, higher than comparable contemporaries such as Boggs, Brock, Carew, and Rose. Among that group, he had more RBIs (1,138) than everyone but Rose.

Nicknamed "Captain Video", Gwynn used video to study his swing before it became common in baseball. When he began the practice in 1983, MLB teams were years away from using video for scouting. Hoffman said that Gwynn "revolutionized video in baseball"; likewise, Padres manager and general manager Jack McKeon called Gwynn the "father of the video in baseball". Gwynn prospered during the steroid era of baseball. While other players were transforming their physiques over a single offseason, his body grew pudgier and rounder. Though no longer the base stealer or defensive player he was early in his career, he continued to excel as a hitter. From 1995 through 2001, Gwynn hit a major league leading .350 while power hitters were recording the six highest single-season home run totals in MLB history.

"He was one of the greatest pure swingers ever, a Hall of Famer with 3,141 hits. But more important, in a sports world filled with arrogance and vitriol, he was unmatched as a human being."

— Bill Plaschke, sportswriter for the Los Angeles Times

Gwynn was known for his dignity and modesty. He received the 1995 Branch Rickey Award, the 1998 Lou Gehrig Memorial Award and the 1999 Roberto Clemente Award, which USA Today called "baseball's Triple Crown of humanity and kindness". Tom Verducci of SI.com called Gwynn "an ambassador not just for the game of baseball but for mankind". Commissioner Selig called Gwynn "the greatest Padre ever and one of the most accomplished hitters that our game has ever known, whose all-around excellence on the field was surpassed by his exuberant personality and genial disposition in life". Hall of Fame pitcher Greg Maddux referred to Gwynn as "the greatest ambassador baseball ever had".

=== National Baseball Hall of Fame ===
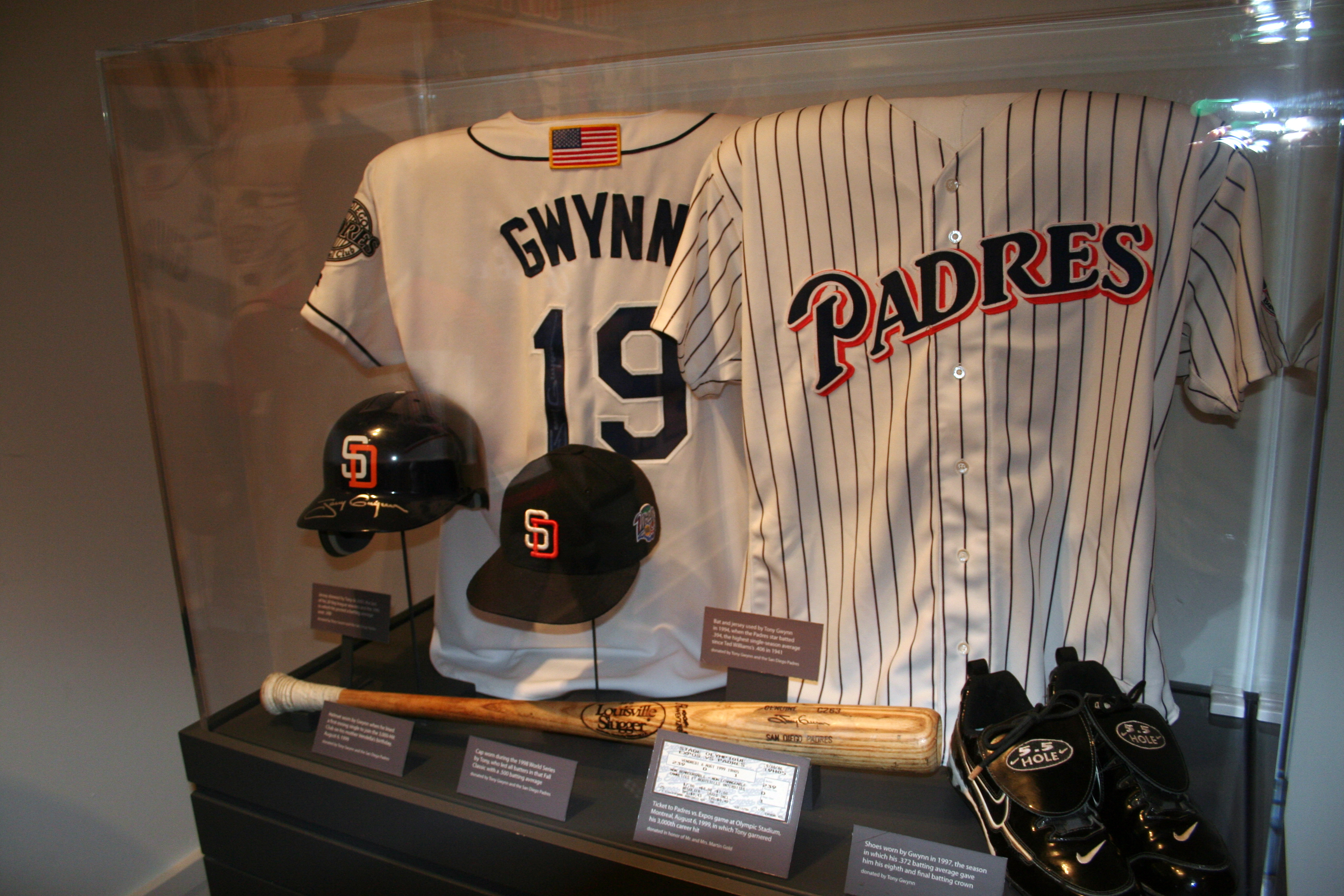
Gwynn's exhibit at the National Baseball Hall of Fame and Museum.

On January 9, 2007, Gwynn was elected to the Baseball Hall of Fame, being selected on 532 out of 545 ballots (97.61%), the seventh highest percentage in Hall of Fame voting history. Upon receiving the news of being elected, Gwynn broke down into tears; his wife Alicia said this was the first time she ever saw him cry. He was relieved that he did not exceed Tom Seaver's record of 98.8 percent. Gwynn considered his selection to be validation for the value of contact hitters, who are not as celebrated as power hitters. He was inducted alongside Cal Ripken Jr. on July 29, 2007. Ripken and Gwynn are two of the 46 players in the Hall of Fame who played their entire major league career for only one team. Both were elected almost unanimously in their first year of eligibility.

External videos
- Tony Gwynn 2007 Baseball Hall of Fame Induction Speech via YouTube

The Gwynn-Ripken induction weekend set a number of attendance records, which were announced during the ceremony. About 14,000 people visited the Hall of Fame Museum on July 28, a record number for a single-day. Baseball attendance for all games played on July 28 also set a single-day record. The induction ceremony also had the greatest collection of Hall of Famers present, 53 of the 61 living members. A record crowd estimated at 75,000 attended the induction ceremony, shattering the previous record of 25,000 in 1999. A week before his induction, Gwynn appeared on a Wheaties box. Additionally, a giant 1984 replica Tony Gwynn Padres jersey measuring 35 feet (11 m) tall and 30 feet (9.1 m) wide was draped on the tower of the San Diego County Administration Building to commemorate the occasion.

=== Other honors and tributes ===
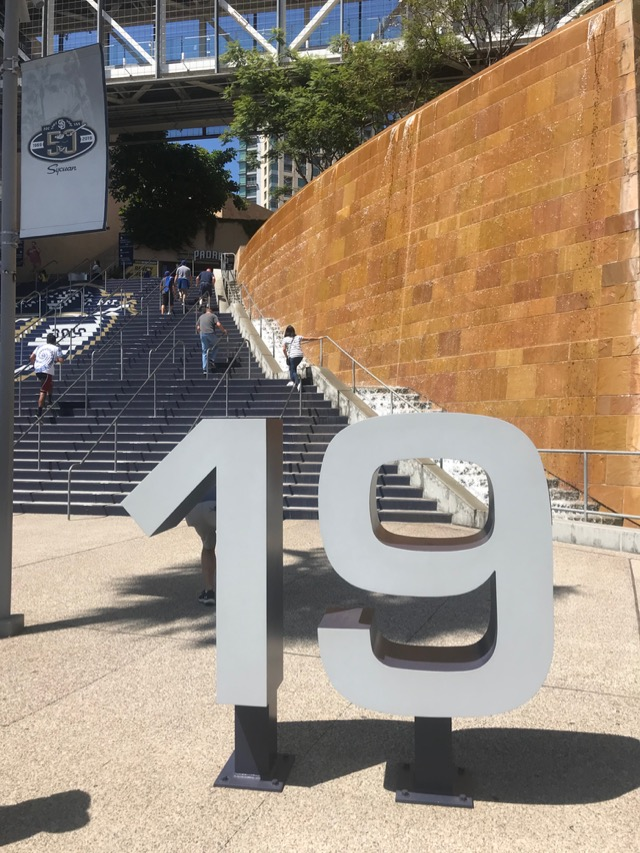
Gwynn's No. 19, retired by the Padres, displayed at Petco Park

In 1989, Gwynn was inducted into the San Diego State Aztecs Hall of Fame. In 1997, SDSU's baseball facility, Smith Stadium, was extensively renovated with $4 million from Padres owner John Moores. At Moores' request, the stadium was renamed Tony Gwynn Stadium.

Gwynn was inducted into the Padres Hall of Fame in 2002, and the team retired his No. 19 in 2004. In 2002, Gwynn was also inducted into the Breitbard Hall of Fame, which honors athletes in San Diego. He was posthumously inducted into the California Hall of Fame in 2016.

In 2007, a 9½-foot (2.9 m), 1,200-pound (540 kg) bronze statue of Gwynn was unveiled in the park just beyond Petco Park's outfield in an area named Tony Gwynn Plaza. The address of Petco Park is 19 Tony Gwynn Drive.

In 2014, the Mountain West Conference posthumously renamed its baseball Player of the Year Award to the Tony Gwynn Award. In 2015, a segment of Interstate 15 in San Diego County was designated with road signage as "Tony Gwynn Memorial Freeway". At the 2016 All-Star Game in San Diego, MLB announced that the annual winner of the NL batting title would be known henceforth as the "Tony Gwynn National League Batting Champion". On May 9, 2017, a memorial statue in his honor was unveiled at Lake Poway.

== Post-playing career ==
Coaching career
Biographical details
- Education: San Diego State University

Coaching career (HC unless noted)
- 2002: San Diego State (volunteer assistant)
- 2003–2014: San Diego State

Head coaching record
- Overall: 363–363–0 (.500)
- Tournaments: 1–6 (NCAA Division I)

Accomplishments and honors

Championships
- MWC regular season (2004); 2 MWC tournament (2013, 2014)

Awards
- MWC Coach of the Year (2014)

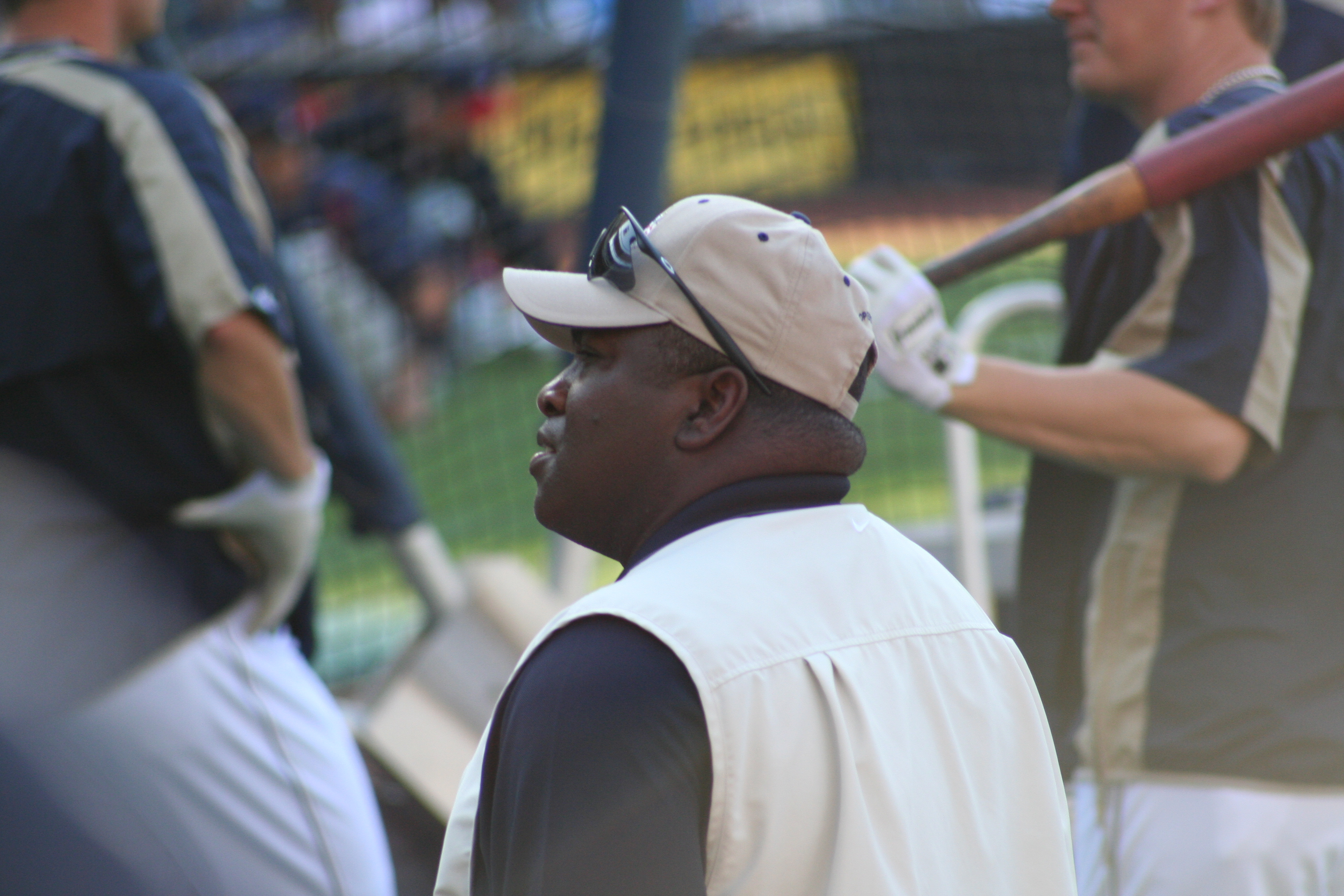
Gwynn in 2006 during pre-game batting practice at Petco Park

Following his playing career, Gwynn was the baseball head coach at SDSU for 12 seasons, compiling a 363–363 record including three Mountain West Conference championships and three NCAA tournament appearances. During his last season playing for the Padres in 2001, he lobbied for the coaching position after Jim Dietz announced he would step down after the 2002 season. In September 2001, Gwynn signed a three-year contract with his alma mater to be an unpaid volunteer coach for 2002 with a base salary of $100,000 starting in 2003. Gwynn successfully lobbied for the SDSU Aztecs to play the first baseball game at Petco Park after the ballpark opened in 2004. The opponent was the Houston Cougars as a homage to the alma mater of Padres owner John Moores. The game drew a crowd of over 40,000 which set a record for the most attendees at a college baseball game; the Aztecs won.

In the five-year period 2007–2011, the baseball team was penalized with a reduction in scholarships for failing to meet the NCAA's Academic Progress Rate. However, Gwynn's teams improved their academic performance for the five years ending in 2012. The Aztecs finished .500 or better in five of Gwynn's final seven seasons, and they qualified for the NCAA tournament three times in his final six seasons. As the Aztecs' coach, Gwynn oversaw the development of future major leaguers such as Justin Masterson and Stephen Strasburg, the No. 1 overall draft pick in 2009; under Gwynn's coaching, Strasburg won the 2009 Dick Howser Trophy, which is awarded annually to the nation's best college baseball player. During his coaching tenure, Gwynn attracted uncharacteristically large crowds to games and other events, with most people coming mainly to see Gwynn (rather than the team and players) and possibly seek out his autograph; for this, San Diego Union-Tribune sportswriter Kirk Kenney said that Gwynn had "rock star status".

Gwynn's bout with cancer caused him to miss time intermittently. He missed the start of the 2012 season after undergoing surgery, and missed games in 2013 while involved with a clinical trial. Days before his death in June 2014, he was given a one-year contract extension although he had been on a leave of absence since March while recovering from cancer treatment.

Gwynn was also a broadcaster, working as a game and studio analyst for ESPN. He also worked postseason games on TBS, and served as an expert analyst for Yahoo! Sports. He also served as color analyst for Padres games on Channel 4 in San Diego and later Fox Sports San Diego.

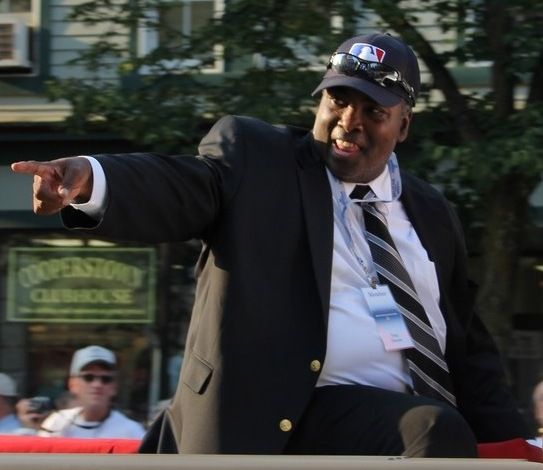
Gwynn in 2011 at the Baseball Hall of Fame induction parade

In May 2012, Gwynn joined a group led by movie producer Thomas Tull to bid on purchasing the Padres from Moores. Gwynn had no financial stake in the group, and Tull withdrew his bid in June.

=== Head coaching record ===
Record table
Season	Team	Overall	Conference	Standing	Postseason
San Diego State Aztecs (Mountain West Conference) (2003–2014)
2003	San Diego State	29–32	18–12	T–2nd	
2004	San Diego State	35–29	19–9	1st	
2005	San Diego State	26–35	17–13	3rd	
2006	San Diego State	23–36	14–8	T–2nd	
2007	San Diego State	29–30	12–12	T–3rd	
2008	San Diego State	31–28	16–8	T–2nd	
2009	San Diego State	41–23	15–9	4th	NCAA Regional
2010	San Diego State	28–28	13–11	3rd	
2011	San Diego State	22–36	11–13	4th	
2012	San Diego State	26–34	12–12	3rd	
2013	San Diego State	31–31	15–15	3rd	NCAA Regional
2014	San Diego State	42–21	17–13	3rd	NCAA Regional
San Diego State:		363–363 (.500)	179–135 (.570)		
Total:		363–363 (.500)			
National champion Postseason invitational champion Conference regular season champion Conference regular season and conference tournament champion Division regular season champion Division regular season and conference tournament champion Conference tournament champion

== Personal life ==
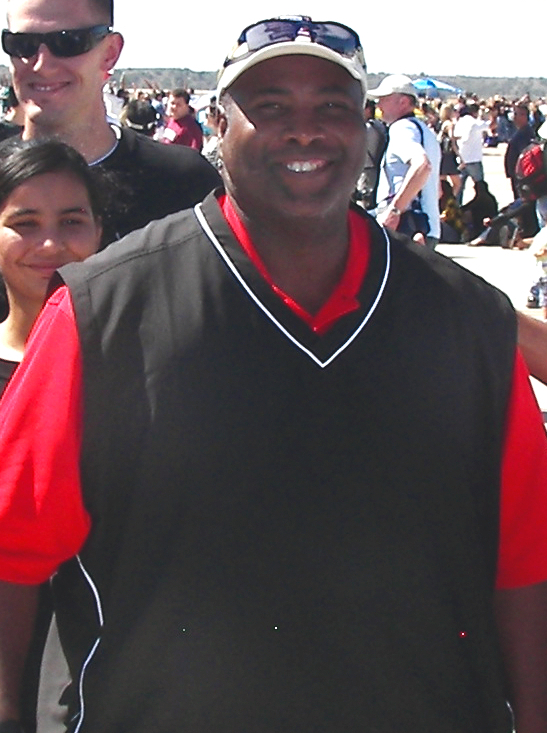
Gwynn c. 2009

Despite being born and raised in Southern California, Gwynn's family was from Tennessee, and his voice was characterized as having a "country accent", "Southern-esque drawl", and "Arkansas accent". Gwynn (along with his father) was fond of jazz music; he regularly listened to the genre prior to his baseball games, as well as during his 2010 radiation treatments to soothe his fear, anxiety, and unease. Kirk Whalum and Boney James were among the specific musicians he listened to. When Gwynn and Darrin Jackson were teammates on the Padres between 1989 and 1992, the pair frequently did golfing, fishing, and ping-pong together. Gwynn had vanity plates printed with "TGwynn" and "Padre19". Gwynn had a fear of flying.

Gwynn married Alicia Cureton on June 6, 1981, at a small Baptist church in Long Beach. Alicia grew up in Southern California after having been born in Beaufort, South Carolina. When Gwynn played for the Padres, she frequently cooked her homemade family fried chicken recipe which the team ate in the clubhouse. When he coached at SDSU, she also cooked some for the fans, among whom it was popular. She later launched a food truck brand called "Gwynn Foods" centered around that recipe. Gwynn was the father of R&B singer Anisha Nicole and major league outfielder Tony Gwynn Jr., whose major league debut (with the Milwaukee Brewers) and first major league hit on July 19, 2006, came 24 years to the day after his father's first major league hit—each Gwynn hit a double. Gwynn's brother, Chris, was also a major league outfielder. Both Chris and Tony Jr. played with the Padres during their careers.

Gwynn and his wife moved to Poway, California, in the mid-1980s. In 1991, they moved to a home in northern Poway, where he lived until his death. In 1993, they bought a home in Fishers, Indiana, a suburb in Indianapolis where they lived during the baseball offseason for over a decade. Alicia owned Steady Play, a sportswear business based in Fishers, and Studio 815, a recording studio in Indianapolis. Gwynn enjoyed the relative obscurity he had in Indiana where he could live an ordinary life while virtually nobody in public knew or recognized him. He was a fan of the Indiana Pacers professional basketball team, often attending their games; he first got season tickets for them in the mid-1990s, two rows behind the Pacers bench. On August 13, 1999, days after he collected his 3,000th career hit, Gwynn became the 3,000th season ticket holder of the Indiana Fever, a new women's basketball franchise.

In 1997, Gwynn noticed forgeries of his signature on Padres memorabilia in an official team store in Encinitas, California. After alerting MLB management, he assisted the FBI in verifying his signature and identifying fake autographs during their nationwide Operation Bullpen, which hunted down rings of memorabilia forgers.

=== Tobacco usage and health problems ===
While he was a member of the SDSU Aztecs baseball team, Gwynn started using smokeless tobacco (particularly dipping tobacco) on a regular basis, marking the beginning of his long-term addiction. The Gwynn family's legal case asserted that Gwynn was "deluged" with free samples from tobacco company campus sales representatives throughout his college baseball tenure. Over the next three decades, he consumed approximately two tins of the substance per day; the National Institutes of Health stated that Gwynn's tobacco usage was equivalent to smoking roughly four or five cigarette packs per day.

Gwynn had three procedures to remove noncancerous growths from his parotid gland beginning in 1997. In 2010, he was diagnosed with cancer of a salivary gland and had lymph nodes and tumors from the gland removed; the cancerous location was the spot where Gwynn had placed his dipping tobacco daily for the prior three decades. The operation left his face partially paralyzed on the right side, leaving him unable to smile. Later that year, he underwent eight weeks of chemotherapy and radiation treatments. He was declared cancer-free afterwards, and also regained his ability to smile. Additional surgery was performed in 2012 to remove more cancerous growth and address nerve damage. Gwynn and his family attributed the cancer to his long-term dipping tobacco habit. A few doctors stated that studies had not linked parotid cancer with use of chewing tobacco.

After his playing career ended, Gwynn's weight peaked at 330 pounds (150 kg), and he underwent adjustable gastric banding surgery in 2009, in an attempt to lose weight. He did not closely adhere to the diet, and his weight loss began to stall. In 2010, his weight problem led to a slipped disc in his back that affected a nerve down his leg. He needed a walker before he had the damaged disc removed to cure the pain while walking. Later, he experienced a loss of taste for food during radiation therapy for his cancer. During that time, he was limited to a liquid diet and lost 80 pounds (36 kg), all of which he regained after he resumed eating solid foods.

=== Death ===
During another round of cancer treatments in April 2014, a mishap occurred in which Gwynn lost oxygen and was barely able to move. He was sent to rehabilitation to learn how to walk again.

On June 15, 2014, Father's Day, Gwynn went into cardiac arrest, and was rushed from his home to the hospital. The next day, Gwynn died at Pomerado Hospital in Poway of complications from his cancer. He was 54 years old.

A public memorial service was held for Gwynn at Petco Park on June 26, 2014. The service was attended by 23,229 fans, who heard tributes to Gwynn from baseball and civic leaders, and from Gwynn's family. He was interred at Dearborn Memorial Park in Poway.

In 2018, Gwynn's family reached a confidential settlement with the U.S. Smokeless Tobacco Company after filing a wrongful death lawsuit against the company in 2016, charging that Gwynn had become "hopelessly addicted" to its products.

==== Impact on tobacco usage in MLB ====
Gwynn was referred to as the "poster player for banning smokeless tobacco." Weeks before he died, Gwynn authored and endorsed a video message addressed to major and minor league players that warned of the health dangers of smokeless tobacco and urged them to quit or refrain from using the substance; Gwynn wanted to speak the part, but was physically unable to use his voice due to his cancer condition, so someone else spoke the message on his behalf. Gwynn's death brought the previously obscure issue of ubiquitous tobacco usage in MLB to the forefront of public awareness, prompting calls for a league-wide ban on the substance. A total of nine major anti-tobacco health organizations (Note: The American Dental Association, American Medical Association, American Cancer Society, American Heart Association, American Lung Association, and four others) co-wrote a letter to MLB commissioner Bud Selig and the Major League Baseball Players Association (MLBPA) executive director Tony Clark; the letter included the following statements:

"As so many in baseball and in the media have expressed, Tony Gwynn was a true hero. We are deeply saddened that his life was ended far too soon by cancer that he attributed to his longtime use of chewing tobacco."

"There could be no better way to honor Tony Gwynn than to prohibit tobacco use throughout Major League Baseball."

This ultimately led to a prohibition on smokeless tobacco for incoming players being written into the 2016 labor agreement, with existing players receiving a grandfather exemption. Of the change, Gwynn's widow Alicia said, "I think it's a victory, and a positive step in the right direction." Additionally, veteran players Addison Reed and Stephen Strasburg (who were both coached by Gwynn at SDSU), and Chris Sale all chose to quit using tobacco upon learning about Gwynn's death.

== Baseball achievements ==
=== Awards and honors ===
Award/Honor	# of times	Dates	Refs
NL batting champion	8	1984, 1987, 1988, 1989, 1994, 1995, 1996, 1997	
NL All-Star	15	1984, 1985, 1986, 1987, 1989, 1990, 1991, 1992, 1993, 1994, 1995, 1996, 1997, 1998, 1999	
NL Silver Slugger	7	1984, 1986, 1987, 1989, 1994, 1995, 1997	
NL Gold Glove	5	1986, 1987, 1989, 1990, 1991	
Commissioner's Historic Achievement Award	1	2001	
Roberto Clemente Award	1	1999	
Lou Gehrig Memorial Award	1	1998	
Branch Rickey Award	1	1995	

=== Records ===
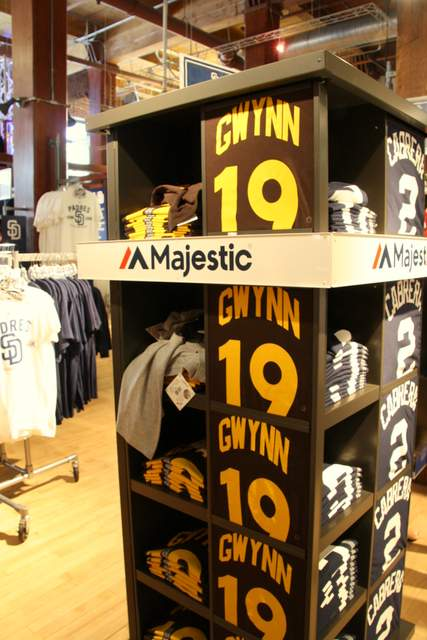
Gwynn No. 19 shirts on display

Major League records
Accomplishment	Record	Refs
Most 5-hit games in a season	4 (Note: Tied with Willie Keeler, Ty Cobb, Stan Musial, and Ichiro Suzuki.) (1993)	

National League records
Accomplishment	Record	Refs
Most batting titles	8 (Note: Tied with Honus Wagner)	
Most seasons leading league in hits	7 (Note: Tied with Pete Rose)	
Most consecutive seasons batting .300 or better	19	
Most seasons leading league in singles	7	

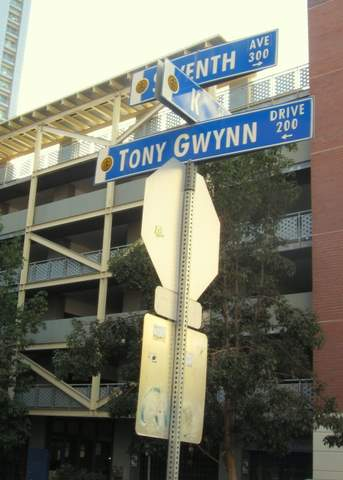
Tony Gwynn Drive outside of Petco Park.

Padres records
Accomplishment	Record	Refs
Highest batting average, career	.338	
Highest batting average, season	.394 (1994)	
Highest on-base percentage, season	.454 (1994)	
Most games played, career	2,440	
Most at bats, career	9,288	
Most plate appearances, career	10,232	
Most runs scored, career	1,383	
Most hits, career	3,141	
Most hits, season	220 (1997)	
Most total bases, career	4,259	
Most doubles, career	543	
Most doubles, season	49 (1997)	
Most triples, career	85	
Most triples, season	13 (Note: Tied with Dave Roberts) (1987)	
Most runs batted in, career	1,138	
Most walks, career	790	
Most stolen bases, career	319	

== Career statistics ==
- **Bold** indicates Padres all-time leader

AVG	G	AB	R	H	2B	3B	HR	RBI	BB	SO	SB	CS	OBP	SLG	FLD
**.338**	**2,440**	**9,288**	**1,383**	**3,141**	**543**	**85**	135	**1,138**	**790**	434	**319**	**125**	.388	.459	.987

== Publications ==
- Gwynn, Tony; Geschke, Jim (1986). Tony!. Contemporary Books. ISBN 0-8092-5034-9.
- Gwynn, Tony; Rosenthal, Jim (1992). Gwynn's Total Baseball Player. St. Martin's Press. ISBN 0-312-07097-7.
- Gwynn, Tony; Vaughan, Roger (1998). The Art of Hitting. GT Pub. ISBN 1-57719-347-4.

== Filmography ==
- Tony Gwynn: Mr. Padre. Major League Baseball Network. 2018.

== See also ==
- Triple Play 97, a baseball video game featuring Gwynn on the cover
- DHL Hometown Heroes
- List of Major League Baseball annual runs scored leaders
- List of Major League Baseball career batting average leaders
- List of Major League Baseball career doubles leaders
- List of Major League Baseball career runs batted in leaders
- List of Major League Baseball career runs scored leaders
- List of Major League Baseball career stolen bases leaders
- List of Major League Baseball career total bases leaders
- List of Major League Baseball hit records
- List of Major League Baseball single-game hits leaders
- List of San Diego Padres team records
- List of San Diego State University people
- Major League Baseball titles leaders
- San Diego Padres award winners and league leaders
