= West Long Beach, Long Beach, California =

Coordinates: 33°48′03″N 118°12′53″W

West Long Beach, California Westside
- Neighborhood of Long Beach
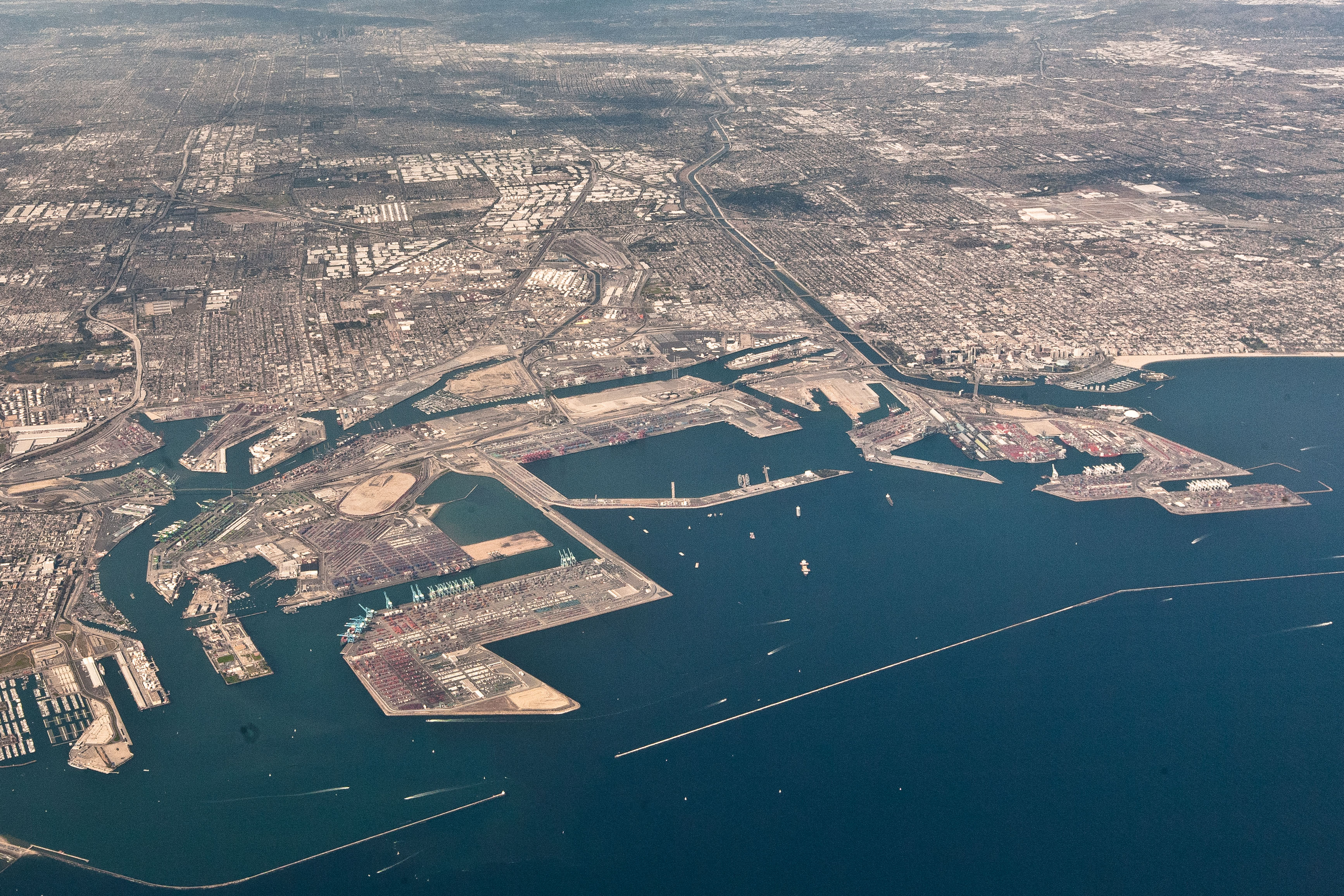
- Aerial view of the Port of Long Beach and West Long Beach
- Interactive map of West Long Beach, California
- Country: United States
- State: California
- County: Los Angeles
- City: Long Beach

West Long Beach (or "the Westside") is a working-class neighborhood in Long Beach, California.

It is the westernmost part of Long Beach, separated from the rest of the city by the Long Beach Freeway (Interstate 710) and the Los Angeles River. Its boundaries are the Los Angeles River to the east, Interstate 405 to the north, Anaheim Street to the south, and Wilmington, Carson, and the Terminal Island Freeway to the west.

The largest industry in the area is the combined Ports of Long Beach and Los Angeles. There is also a large Shell Oil refinery in nearby Wilmington and the massive Intermodal Container Transfer Facility (ICTF) on the neighborhood's western edge. The neighborhood is a mix of older residential housing, apartments and townhouses, and industrial buildings. The primary thoroughfare is Santa Fe Avenue, which runs north to south through the center of the neighborhood. The neighborhood has three official parks: Hudson Park, Admiral Kidd Park, and Silverado Park.

The neighborhood was historically a working-class neighborhood due to its proximity to the Port of Long Beach and the large Shell Oil refinery in nearby Wilmington. A large US Navy housing complex once stood in the neighborhood on Santa Fe Avenue near Pacific Coast Highway (Cabrillo High School and Admiral Kidd Park now stands on the site). Like many neighborhoods with largely working-class populations, deindustrialization in the 1970s took its toll, and the neighborhood was largely poor by the early 1980s. A local neighborhood group, the West Long Beach Association, was founded in 1997 to improve the living conditions in the neighborhood. While conditions have improved in the early 2000s, the neighborhood is still one of the poorest in Long Beach. As of July 2011, residents in West Long Beach had no access to banking services. There has been and continues to be heavy gang activity and a high rate of violent crime in the neighborhood, and large portions of the neighborhood are under gang injunctions directed at the East Side Longos, West Side Longos gang and Rollin 80's West Coast Crip Gang, as well as home to other local gangs such as Sons of Samoa Samoan gang, Westside Islanders Chamorro/Filipino gang, Pimpside Phamily Filipino gang, Cove Side Neighborhood Crip gang, and Long Beach Satanas Filipino gang.

According to the 2000 US Census, there were 35,637 residents of the 90810 ZIP code, which is nearly coterminous with West Long Beach. In terms of race and ethnicity, the neighborhood's population was roughly 23.8% Caucasian, 16.4% African American, 0.8% American Indian, 23.2% Asian, 3.1% Pacific Islander, 27.2% other races, and 5.5% two or more races. Hispanics and Latinos made up 45.6% of the population.

The area is served by Cabrillo High School (9–12), Stephens Middle School (6–8), Muir Academy (K–8), and Garfield Elementary (K-5); all operated by the Long Beach Unified School District. Hudson Elementary (K–5) closed down in 2025 by the LBUSD Board of Education due to low enrollment. Police service in the area is rendered by the Long Beach Police Department Western Division, which operates a station at Pacific Coast Hwy and Santa Fe.

There is a large Filipino community in the neighborhood.

== See also ==
- Neighborhoods of Long Beach, California
