= Adjusted batting average =

Baseball statistic

The adjusted batting average is a baseball statistic that compensates for factors inherently unique to each individual hitter such as era, home ballpark, pitching trends, rule changes, and handedness; it also counts only the first 8,000 at-bats to account for late career decline. It was first formulated in 1999 by statistician Michael J. Schell in the book Baseball's All-time Best Hitters: How Statistics Can Level the Playing Field published by Princeton University Press. Using his calculations from said formula, Schell posited that Tony Gwynn is the greatest MLB hitter of all-time with the highest adjusted batting average of .342. Joseph Gallian, a mathematician who independently analyzed Schell's formula in a book published by the Mathematical Association of America wrote, "Of course, Schell's adjusted batting average is far superior to the traditional batting average."

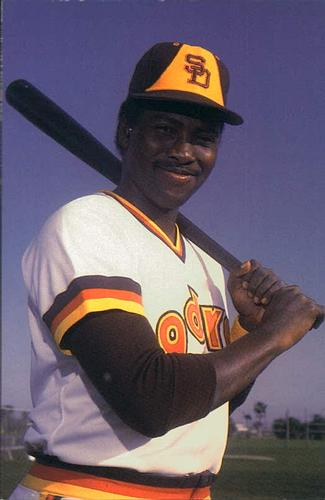
Tony Gwynn has the highest career adjusted batting average at .342.

Top 10
Name	Adjusted batting average	Years played
Tony Gwynn	.342	1982–2001
Ty Cobb	.340	1905–1928
Rod Carew	.332	1967–1985
Joe Jackson	.331	1908–1920
Rogers Hornsby	.330	1915–1937
Ted Williams	.327	1939–1960
Stan Musial	.325	1941–1963
Wade Boggs	.324	1982–1999
Tris Speaker	.322	1907–1928
Willie Mays	.314	1951–1973
