= Silverado Park =

Park in Long Beach, California, United States

- Interactive map of Silverado Park
- Coordinates: 33.81418°N 118.2132°W
- Area: 11.8 acres (4.8 ha)
- Operator: Parks, Recreation & Marine Department, City of Long Beach
- Website: Silverado Park, (City of Long Beach, CA)

Silverado Park is a city-operated park of 11.8 acres (4.8 ha) in the West-Side area of Long Beach, California. It was built in the 1930s under the auspices of the Works Progress Administration. It is in an area with increased crime rates although events such as a children's Christmas party have also taken place there. In 2005 the park was part of a study conducted by CSULB biologists on the behavior of house finches in heavily urbanized environments.
