= Juan Rodriguez Cabrillo High School =

Location
- 2001 Santa Fe Avenue; 33.79374°N 118.21761°W; Long Beach, California; USA

Information
- Type: Public
- Motto: Success in the West! Pride of the Westside!
- Established: 1996
- School district: Long Beach Unified School District
- Principal: My Ngoc Nguyen
- Grades: 9-12
- Enrollment: 1,721 (2023–2024)
- Campus: Urban
- Colors: Green; Black; White
- Mascot: Jaguar
- Team name: JAGS
- Website: https://cabrillo.lbschools.net/

Ethnic composition as of 2020–21
Race and ethnicity	Total
Hispanic or Latino	75.1%
Asian	11.7%
African American	8.5%
Pacific Islander	1.8%
Other	1.6%
Non-Hispanic White/Anglo	1.2%
Native American	0.1%

Juan Rodriguez Cabrillo High School is a high school in Long Beach, California. The school is a part of the Long Beach Unified School District.

== History ==
In the Winter of 1996, the ground was broken for a new high school in West Long Beach. The school officially opened in September 1996 and only started with ninth and tenth grade and a student body of approximately 975 students. Since Cabrillo High School was still under construction at that time, the original plan for the school was that once students completed tenth grade, all students would be transferred to one of the other five comprehensive high schools to complete their secondary education. The tenth-grade students really liked Cabrillo so much that efforts made by the students and parents led the Cabrillo Administration and the LBUSD Board of Education to add eleven and twelve grades. After their requests were made, Cabrillo High School graduated their first class with approximately 74 students receiving their high school diplomas in 1999.

== Academics ==
Throughout the years, Cabrillo has seen tremendous instructional changes through multiple 'house' pathways or (Small Learning Community–SLC):

Cabrillo Academy of Global Logistics (AGL)

Cabrillo Academy of Law and Justice (CAL-J)

Cabrillo Engineering and Design (CED)

Specialized Academy of Compute Media, Arts & Animation (SACMAA)

Cabrillo Health Medical

These SLC's provide Cabrillo students with more options after high school—ranging from college to military (NJROTC) and career opportunities.

== Trivia ==
The school was used as the location for one of the opening scenes from The Fast and the Furious: Tokyo Drift.

During the first season of the television series Glee (TV series), the school was regularly masked as William McKinley High School.

In 2026, the school was used as the location for a Target ad titled "Back to School: Love It".
