= 2004 Conference USA baseball tournament =

- Teams: 8
- Format: Eight-team double-elimination tournament
- Finals site: Cougar Field; Houston, Texas
- Champions: TCU (1st title)
- Winning coach: Jim Schlossnagle (1st title)
- MVP: Austin Adams (TCU)

The 2004 Conference USA baseball tournament was the 2004 postseason college baseball championship of the NCAA Division I Conference USA, held at Cougar Field in Houston, Texas, from May 26 through 30, 2004. The TCU Horned Frogs won the tournament and received the conference's automatic bid to the 2004 NCAA Division I baseball tournament. The tournament consisted of eight teams, with two double-elimination brackets, and a single-game final.

== Regular season results ==
Team	W	L	T	Pct	GB	Seed
East Carolina	25	5	0	.833	--	1
Tulane	21	9	0	.700	4	2
Southern Miss	21	9	0	.700	4	3
TCU	19	11	0	.633	6	4
Houston	19	11	0	.633	6	5
Memphis	15	14	0	.517	9.5	6
UAB	13	16	0	.448	11.5	7
Louisville	13	17	0	.433	12	8
South Florida	12	17	0	.414	12.5	--
Charlotte	9	21	0	.300	16	--
Cincinnati	6	24	0	.200	19	--
Saint Louis	5	24	0	.172	19.5	--

- Records listed are conference play only. Marquette and DePaul did not field baseball teams. South Florida, Charlotte, Cincinnati, and Saint Louis did not make the tournament.

== Bracket ==
First round May 26–27
6	**Memphis**	**10**
3	Southern Miss	5
7	**UAB**	**10**
2	Tulane	4
3	**Southern Miss**	**16**
2	Tulane	4
1	**East Carolina**	**13**
8	Louisville	2
5	**Houston**	**9**
4	TCU	5
8	Louisville	3
4	**TCU**	**4**

Second round May 27–28
7	**UAB**	**7**
6	Memphis	6
6	Memphis	0
3	**Southern Miss**	**13**
5	**Houston**	**6**
1	East Carolina	5
4	**TCU**	**5**
1	East Carolina	4

Semi-finals; May 28–29
7	UAB	10	7
3	**Southern Miss**	**16**	**9**
5	Houston	3	4
4	**TCU**	**8**	**5**

Finals; May 30
4	**TCU**	**3**
3	Southern Miss	1

- **Bold** indicates the winner of the game.
- Italics indicate that the team was eliminated from the tournament.

== Finish order ==
Finish	Team	W	L	T	Pct	Seed	Eliminated By
1	TCU^{†}	5	1	0	.833	4	
2	Southern Miss^{#}	4	2	0	.667	3	TCU
3	Houston	2	2	0	.500	5	TCU
4	UAB	2	2	0	.500	7	Southern Miss
5	East Carolina^{#}	1	2	0	.333	1	TCU
6	Memphis	1	2	0	.333	6	Southern Miss
7	Louisville	0	2	0	.000	8	TCU
8	Tulane^{#}	0	2	0	.000	2	Southern Miss
^{†} - Winner of the tournament and received an automatic bid to the NCAA tournament.^{#} - Received an at-large bid to the NCAA tournament.

== All-tournament team ==
Position	Player	School
C	Brad Willcutt	Southern Mississippi
IF	Matt Shepherd	Southern Mississippi
IF	Jarrett Hoffpauir	Southern Mississippi
IF	Chris Neuman	TCU
IF	Bo Cogbill	TCU
OF	Ryan Frith	Southern Mississippi
OF	Chad Huffman	TCU
OF	Austin Adams	TCU
DH	Kevin Roberts	Houston
P	Mike Cashion	Southern Mississippi
P	Eugene Espinelli	TCU
P	Clayton Jerome	TCU
P	Ryan Weems	TCU
**MVP**	Austin Adams	TCU
