= 2005 Conference USA baseball tournament =

- Teams: 8
- Format: Eight-team double-elimination tournament
- Finals site: Pete Taylor Park; Hattiesburg, Mississippi
- Champions: TCU, Tulane (2nd, 5th title)
- Winning coach: Jim Schlossnagle, Rick Jones (2nd, 5th title)
- MVP: Nathan Southard (Tulane)

The 2005 Conference USA baseball tournament was the 2005 postseason college baseball championship of the NCAA Division I Conference USA, held at Pete Taylor Park in Hattiesburg, Mississippi, from May 25 through 29, 2005. Both TCU and Tulane were declared co-champions due to inclement weather but Tulane was given the automatic bid to the 2005 NCAA Division I baseball tournament. The tournament consisted of eight teams, with two double-elimination brackets, and a single-game final that was cancelled due to inclement weather.

== Regular season results ==
Team	W	L	T	Pct	GB	Seed
Tulane	24	6		.800	--	1
TCU	20	10		.667	4	2
Southern Miss	20	10		.667	4	3
East Carolina	18	12		.600	6	4
Houston	16	13		.552	7.5	5
South Florida	15	14		.517	8.5	6
Louisville	15	14		.517	8.5	7
UAB	14	16		.467	10	8
Charlotte	13	17		.433	11	--
Cincinnati	10	19		.344	13.5	--
Saint Louis	8	22		.267	16	--
Memphis	5	25		.167	19	--

- Records listed are conference play only. Marquette and DePaul did not field baseball teams. Charlotte, Cincinnati, Saint Louis, and Memphis did not make the tournament.

== Bracket ==
First round May 25–26	Second round May 26–27
5	Houston	5
4	**East Carolina**	**6**
4	East Carolina	3
1	**Tulane**	**16**
8	UAB	6
1	**Tulane**	**8**
Bracket One
8	UAB	5
5	**Houston**	**7**	4	East Carolina	4
5	**Houston**	**6**
7	Louisville	2
2	**TCU**	**4**
3	Southern Miss	0
2	**TCU**	**8**
6	USF	3
3	**Southern Miss**	**5**
Bracket Two
7	Louisville	1
6	**USF**	**11**	6	USF	3
3	**Southern Miss**	**9**

Semi-finals; May 27–28
5	Houston	1
1	**Tulane**	**10**
3	Southern Miss	7
2	**TCU**	**13**

Finals; May 29
2	TCU (Note: Tulane and TCU were declared co-champions as the game was cancelled due to inclement weather.)
1	Tulane

- **Bold** indicates the winner of the game.
- Italics indicate that the team was eliminated from the tournament.

== Finish order ==
Finish	Team	W	L	T	Pct	Seed	Eliminated By
1	Tulane^{†}	3	0		1.000	1	
1	TCU^{#}	3	0		1.000	2	
3	Southern Miss^{#}	2	2	0	.500	3	TCU
4	Houston	2	2	0	.500	5	Tulane
5	South Florida	1	2	0	.333	6	Southern Miss
6	East Carolina^{#}	1	2	0	.333	4	Houston
7	Louisville	0	2	0	.000	7	South Florida
8	UAB	0	2	0	.000	8	Houston
^{†} - Winner of the tournament and received an automatic bid to the NCAA tournament.^{#} - Received an at-large bid to the NCAA tournament.

== All-tournament team ==
Position	Player	School
C	Brian Baisley	South Florida
IF	Brad Emaus	Tulane
IF	Chad Huffman	TCU
IF	Dustin Kingsbury	Houston
IF	Trey Sutton	Southern Mississippi
OF	Keith Conlon	TCU
OF	Jason Lowery	Southern Mississippi
OF	Nathan Southard	Tulane
DH	Mike Grace	East Carolina
P	Brian Bogusevic	Tulane
P	Lance Broadway	TCU
P	Sam Demel	TCU
P	Micah Owings	Tulane
**MVP**	Nathan Southard	Tulane
