= Boob Fowler =

American baseball player (1900–1988)

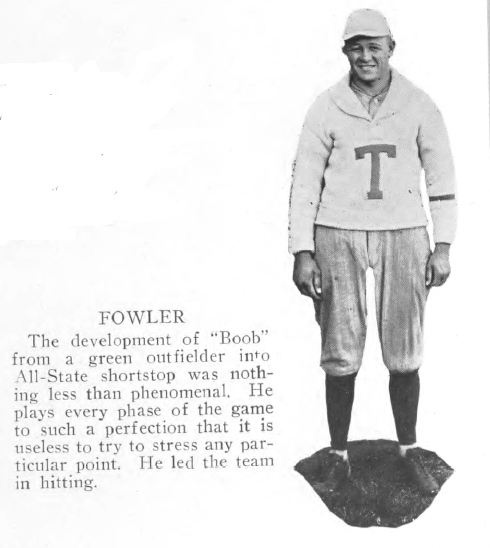
- Shortstop
- Born: November 11, 1900; Waco, Texas, U.S.
- Died: October 8, 1988 (aged 87); Dallas, Texas, U.S.
- Batted: Left Threw: Right

MLB debut
- May 6, 1923, for the Cincinnati Reds

Last MLB appearance
- May 5, 1926, for the Boston Red Sox

MLB statistics
- Batting average: .326
- Home runs: 1
- Runs batted in: 18
- Stats at Baseball Reference

Teams
- Cincinnati Reds (1923–1925); Boston Red Sox (1926)

Joseph Chester "Boob" Fowler (November 11, 1900 – October 8, 1988), also nicknamed "Gink", was an American Major League Baseball shortstop. He played for the Cincinnati Reds (1923–1925) and Boston Red Sox (1926). He stood 5 ft 11 1/2 in (1.82 m) and weighed 180 pounds (82 kg).

Fowler began playing baseball at Texas Christian University where he was given the nickname "Boob" by Horned Frogs head coach Kid Nance.

Fowler saw most of his Major League action in 1924, playing in 59 games with a batting average of .333. In 76 games for Cincinnati, he batted .335 (56-for-167). He closed out his MLB career with two games for the Red Sox in 1926, going 1-for-8 and bringing his lifetime average down to .326. Career totals include 1 home run, 18 runs batted in, 30 runs scored, and a slugging average of .406. His fielding percentage of .905 was well below the Major League average during his era.

Fowler died on October 8, 1988 in Dallas, Texas.
