= Chad Huffman =

American baseball player (born 1985)

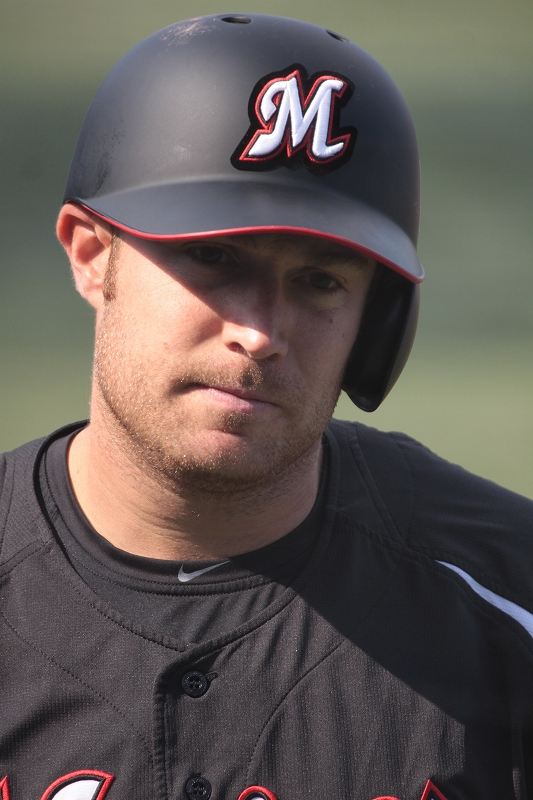
- Huffman with the Chiba Lotte Marines
- Outfielder / First baseman
- Born: April 29, 1985 (age 41); Houston, Texas, U.S.
- Batted: Right Threw: Right

Professional debut
- MLB: June 13, 2010, for the New York Yankees
- NPB: March 28, 2014, for the Chiba Lotte Marines

Last appearance
- NPB: June 9, 2015, for the Chiba Lotte Marines
- MLB: June 24, 2017, for the St. Louis Cardinals

MLB statistics
- Batting average: .219
- Home runs: 0
- Runs batted in: 2

NPB statistics
- Batting average: .260
- Home runs: 4
- Runs batted in: 28
- Stats at Baseball Reference

Teams
- New York Yankees (2010); Chiba Lotte Marines (2014–2015); St. Louis Cardinals (2017)

Chad Daniel Huffman (born April 29, 1985) is an American former professional baseball outfielder and first baseman. He played in Major League Baseball (MLB) for the New York Yankees and St. Louis Cardinals, and in Nippon Professional Baseball (NPB) for the Chiba Lotte Marines.

== Amateur career ==
Huffman played baseball and football at Elkins High School in Missouri City, Texas. He was named first-team all-district in his sophomore year. In 2002, the Knights won the national championship and Huffman was named first-team all-district, all-state and all-Greater Houston as a junior. He broke his arm and missed all but 12 games in his senior year. In 2010, Huffman was inducted into the Elkins High School Baseball Hall of Fame.

After graduating, he attended Texas Christian University (TCU), where he played for the TCU Horned Frogs' baseball team from 2004 to 2006 and football team from 2003 to 2005. In his freshman year, he earned Conference USA freshman of the year and Louisville Slugger Freshman All-American for leading his team in batting average, slugging, runs scored, doubles, and hits. His 97 hits were a new TCU record. He was named to the All-Conference USA Tournament Team in both 2004 and 2005. Before his sophomore season, Huffman was named a Louisville Slugger Second-Team Pre-season All-American. In 2005, he played collegiate summer baseball with the Falmouth Commodores of the Cape Cod Baseball League.

In 2006, Huffman's offensive contributions led the Horned Frogs to the Mountain West regular season and tournament titles for the first time in school history. He was also named MWC tournament MVP. As a junior, Huffman led the team in batting average (.388) and walks (38), while putting up career-high numbers in runs (71) and home runs (18). For his efforts, he was named third-team All-American by Baseball America and the National Collegiate Baseball Writer's Association.

== Professional career ==
=== San Diego Padres ===
The San Diego Padres selected Huffman in the second round, with the 53rd overall selection, of the 2006 Major League Baseball draft. He signed with the Padres on June 22 and started his professional career as an outfielder for the Class A Short Season Eugene Emeralds. That year, Huffman's .439 on-base percentage led the Northwest League, and his .343 batting average and .576 slugging were ranked second. He also spent five games with the Fort Wayne Wizards in the Midwest League.

Heading into 2007, Huffman was ranked as the Padres' seventh best prospect by Baseball America. He began the season in High-A with the Lake Elsinore Storm, hitting .307 with 15 home runs and 76 RBI in 84 games. Huffman was a California League All-Star and was then promoted to Double-A in July. His offensive numbers leveled off with the San Antonio Missions, and he hit .270 with seven home runs and 28 RBI.

Before the 2008 season, he was ranked as the 22nd best prospect in the Padres system by Baseball America. That year, he remained with San Antonio, was named to the Texas League All-Star Game, and hit .284 with nine home runs and 58 RBI in 119 games. After the season, he played in the Arizona Fall League and was named a Rising Star.

Prior to the 2009 season, Huffman was rated as the 23rd best prospect in the Padres system. He started the season in Triple-A and was a replacement on the PCL roster for the Triple-A All-Star Game and Home Run Derby that year. Huffman won the 2009 derby at PGE Park as a member of the hometown Portland Beavers. After hitting .269 with 20 home runs in 2009, he was added to the Padres' 40-man roster.

Baseball America called him the Padres' 21st best prospect before the 2010. However, he was designated for assignment in spring training in order make room on the 40-man roster for Matt Stairs.

=== New York Yankees ===
On April 7, 2010, Huffman was claimed off waivers by New York Yankees and was sent to Triple-A Scranton. On June 13, the New York Yankees recalled Huffman to replace the injured Marcus Thames. Prior to the call up, Huffman hit .279 with 5 home runs, 22 RBIs, and an on-base percentage of .344 over 190 at bats with the Triple-A Scranton/Wilkes-Barre Yankees. He got his first career hit in his first Major League at-bat. Huffman was optioned back to Triple-A on July 4 when Thames came off the disabled list. He was designated for assignment on September 15.

=== Cleveland Indians ===
On September 17, 2010, he was claimed by the Cleveland Indians and optioned to the Triple-A Columbus Clippers. Huffman was removed from the 40-man roster on November 3 and sent outright to Columbus. On April 21, he hit three home runs and drove in 10 runs in a game. That year, he hit .246 with 13 home runs and 58 RBI. After the season, Huffman played in the Arizona Fall League.

He was a non-roster invitee with the Indians for spring training in 2012 and was assigned to Triple-A on March 27. He hit .282 with six home runs and 33 RBI in 67 games.

=== St. Louis Cardinals ===
On February 11, 2013, Huffman signed a minor league deal with the St. Louis Cardinals. He spent the season in Triple-A, hitting.282 with 13 home runs and 55 RBI.

=== Chiba Lotte Marines ===
On December 14, 2013, Huffman signed a one-year deal with the Chiba Lotte Marines in Japan's Nippon Professional Baseball. His first NPB home run was a grand slam against the Tokyo Yakult Swallows. During the 2014 season, Huffman batted .270 with 20 doubles, four home runs and 28 RBIs in 67 games. He played 64 games with the Marines' minor league squad in 2015.

=== Detroit Tigers ===
On December 30, 2015, Huffman signed a minor league contract with the Detroit Tigers. He played in 122 games for the Triple–A Toledo Mud Hens and hit .286/.388/.505 with 17 home runs, a team-high 70 RBI, and 11 stolen bases. Huffman elected free agency following the season on November 7, 2016.

=== St. Louis Cardinals ===
On November 18, 2016, Huffman signed a minor league deal with the St. Louis Cardinals that included an invitation to spring training. The Cardinals promoted him to the major leagues on June 7, 2017. On June 13, he hit a triple against the Milwaukee Brewers as a pinch hitter to garner his first major league hit since 2010. After 12 games with St. Louis, Huffman was optioned to Triple-A on June 25. On July 25, he was outrighted and given his unconditional release.

=== Washington Nationals ===
On July 27, 2017, Huffman signed a minor league deal with the Washington Nationals. In 28 games for the Triple–A Syracuse Chiefs, he batted .203/.294/.311 with one home run and five RBI. Huffman elected free agency following the season on November 6.

=== Detroit Tigers (second stint) ===
Huffman signed a minor league contract with the Detroit Tigers on November 25, 2017. The deal included an invitation to the Tigers' 2018 spring training camp. Huffman spent the entire 2018 season in Triple-A with the Toledo Mud Hens. He was an All-Star that year and won the Triple-A Home Run Derby at Huntington Park. He helped lead the team to its first playoff berth since 2007, hitting .268/.359/.457 with 12 home runs and 40 RBI in 85 games. Huffman elected free agency following the season on November 2.

== Personal life ==
Huffman is the son of Debbie and Royce Huffman (TCU Horned Frogs football player 1969–73), and has two older brothers. Royce Jr. was an all-conference performer in TCU Horned Frogs football and TCU Horned Frogs baseball from 1995 to 1999. He was taken by the Houston Astros in the 12th round of the 1999 MLB draft and played for 11 years in the minors. Scott played football and baseball at Rice University from 1998 to 2002.
