= Jarrett Hoffpauir =

American baseball player (born 1983)

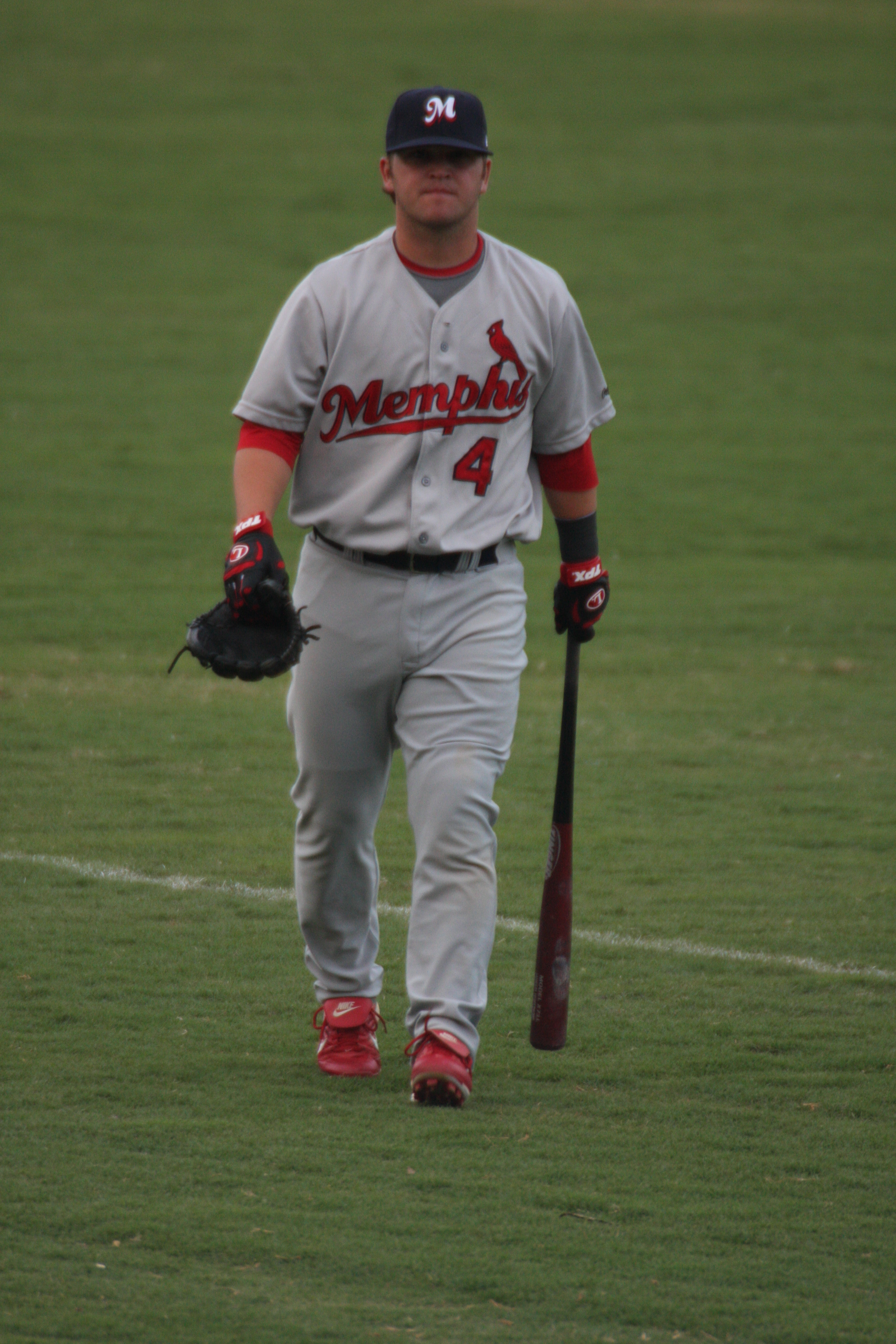
- Hoffpauir with the Memphis Redbirds
- Third baseman / Second baseman
- Born: June 18, 1983 (age 42); Natchez, Mississippi, U.S.
- Batted: Right Threw: Right

MLB debut
- July 3, 2009, for the St. Louis Cardinals

Last MLB appearance
- October 3, 2010, for the Toronto Blue Jays

MLB statistics
- Batting average: .217
- Home runs: 0
- Runs batted in: 2
- Stats at Baseball Reference

Teams
- St. Louis Cardinals (2009); Toronto Blue Jays (2010)

Jarrett Lee Hoffpauir (born June 18, 1983) is an American former professional baseball second baseman. He is a distant cousin to Micah Hoffpauir, who is also a baseball player.

Hoffpauir was drafted by the St. Louis Cardinals in the 6th round of the 2004 Major League Baseball draft from the University of Southern Mississippi following his junior year, during which he hit .405 with 92 RBI and was named to the All-Conference Tournament Team. Hoffpauir currently holds Southern Mississippi single-season records for most hits (109) and most RBI (92).

He was recalled to join the Cardinals on July 1, 2009, and made his debut in Cincinnati on July 3.

Jarrett was claimed off waivers by the Toronto Blue Jays on November 3, 2009

On April 25, 2010, he hit for the cycle for Triple-A Las Vegas against Sacramento, going 4–5. On May 28, 2010, he hit for the cycle again against Tacoma, going 4–4.

On June 20, 2010, the Blue Jays purchased Hoffpauir's contract and optioned Edwin Encarnación to Las Vegas.

On October 6, 2010, Hoffpauir was claimed off waivers by the San Diego Padres.

Hoffpauir signed a minor league contract with the Washington Nationals on December 14, 2011. After becoming a free agent, Hoffpauir signed a minor league contract with the Blue Jays on January 25, 2013, but was released soon after.
