= TCU Horned Frogs baseball =

American collegiate baseball program

TCU Horned Frogs
- 2026 TCU Horned Frogs baseball team
- Founded: 1896 (129 years ago)
- Conference history: Independent (1896–1922); Southwest (1923–1996); WAC (1997–2001); Conference USA (2002–2005); Mountain West (2006–2012)
- Overall record: 2,215–1,663–25
- University: Texas Christian University
- Head coach: Kirk Saarloos (5th season)
- Conference: Big 12
- Location: Fort Worth, Texas
- Home stadium: Lupton Stadium (capacity: 4,500)
- Nickname: Horned Frogs
- Colors: Purple and white

College World Series appearances
- 2010, 2014, 2015, 2016, 2017, 2023

NCAA regional champions
- 2009, 2010, 2012, 2014, 2015, 2016, 2017, 2023

NCAA tournament appearances
- 1956, 1994, 2004, 2005, 2006, 2007, 2008, 2009, 2010, 2011, 2012, 2014, 2015, 2016, 2017, 2019, 2021, 2022, 2023, 2025

Conference tournament champions
- CUSA: 2004, 2005; MWC: 2006, 2007, 2008, 2010; Big 12: 2014, 2016, 2021, 2023

Conference regular season champions
- SWC: 1933, 1956, 1963, 1966, 1967, 1972, 1994; CUSA: 2004, 2005; MWC: 2006, 2007, 2008, 2009, 2010, 2011, 2012; Big 12: 2015, 2017, 2021, 2022

The TCU Horned Frogs baseball team represents Texas Christian University in NCAA Division I baseball. The Frogs have competed in the Big 12 Conference since 2013 and previously competed in the Mountain West, Conference USA, Western Athletic Conference and Southwest Conference. Since February 2003, the Horned Frogs have played their home games at Lupton Stadium, located on the TCU campus in Fort Worth, Texas. The Frogs are led by head coach Kirk Saarloos.

== History ==
=== The early years ===
TCU has fielded a baseball team since 1896, before the university found its permanent home in Fort Worth. The Horned Frog baseball team began playing baseball in the Southwest Conference (SWC) when it became a member of the conference in 1923. In their inaugural SWC season, the Frogs finished the year with a 13–11 overall record and a 2–10 conference record.

=== The Southwest Conference years ===
In 1933 Dutch Meyer, most noted for his tenure as head coach of the two-time national champion football team, led TCU to its first SWC title with a 9–1 record. The Horned Frogs went on to win 4 more SWC titles in 1956, 1966, 1967 and 1994. The SWC baseball tournament began in 1977, but the Horned Frogs never earned a conference tournament title before the SWC dissolved following the 1996 baseball season.

=== The wandering years ===
The dissolution of the SWC in 1996 touched off a period of instability for the Horned Frogs that lasted nearly two decades, during which they made stops in six conferences. Following the dissolution of the SWC, the TCU Horned Frogs first joined the Western Athletic Conference (WAC). During the 1997 and 1998 seasons, TCU competed in the WAC South Division with the New Mexico Lobos, UNLV Rebels, and former SWC member Rice Owls. The Horned Frogs made two appearances in the WAC baseball tournament in the team's five seasons as a member of the WAC. Eight WAC member schools joined with schools from several other conferences to form the new Mountain West Conference (MWC) in 2000. Two seasons later, TCU joined the Houston Cougars, another former SWC member, in entering Conference USA (C-USA) for the 2002 season.

Longtime TCU head coach Lance Brown, a SWC hall-of-famer as both a TCU player and TCU coach, retired after the 2003 season. Through his career as TCU's skipper, Brown notched a school-record 517 wins. After Brown's departure, TCU would go on to make several more conference moves in the early 2000s and see an emergence of its baseball program as a perennial national power.

=== TCU's emergence under Jim Schlossnagle ===
Jim Schlossnagle was hired as TCU's head coach in 2003 and coached his first season at TCU in Spring 2004. His impact was immediate. Former Head Coach Lance Brown had recruited several exceptional classes, which allowed Schlossnagle to coach his first TCU team to the program's first regular season conference championship in a decade, its first conference tournament championship in history, and its first NCAA tournament appearance since 1994. Under Schlossnagle, conference championships began piling up year after year, in conference after conference. Schlossnagle's Horned Frogs repeated as C-USA regular season and tournament champions in 2005, and once again earned a berth to the NCAA tournament.

Prior to the 2006 season, conference realignment again led TCU to change conferences as eight other C-USA members changed conference homes. The Horned Frogs joined the Mountain West Conference (MWC), where the Frogs competed for seven years (2006–2012). In each season in the MWC, TCU advanced to the NCAA tournament and won at least a share of the Mountain West regular season title. In those seven years, TCU also won four MWC Tournament championships. During this era, TCU won its first-ever NCAA Regional Championship in 2009, and repeated the feat in 2010 and 2012. In 2009, the Horned Frogs advanced to its first NCAA Super Regional, where the Texas Longhorns eliminated TCU from the Tournament. In 2010, TCU and Texas met again in an NCAA Super Regional, but the Horned Frogs emerged from the rematch—advancing to the College World Series for the first time in school history. TCU compiled a 3–2 record in its first CWS appearance, eventually falling in the national semifinal to UCLA.

In 2011, the MWC Champion Horned Frogs were eliminated from the NCAA tournament in the Fort Worth Regional, but TCU came storming back in 2012 by winning the College Station Regional over host Texas A&M. TCU advanced to the 2012 Los Angeles Super Regional, where they were again eliminated from NCAA tournament play by the Bruins.

=== The Big 12 Conference era ===
After 16 combined seasons wandering through the Western Athletic Conference, Conference USA and Mountain West Conference (and after brief plan to join the Big East Conference), the Horned Frogs rejoined three former SWC rivals, the Baylor Bears, Texas Longhorns, and Texas Tech Red Raiders, as members of the Big 12 Conference. Pre-season expectations for the Horned Frogs were high after the 2012 Super Regional run, but TCU finished their inaugural season in the Big 12 with a 29–28 record. This season marked the first and only time under Jim Schlossnagle that the Horned Frogs failed to make the NCAA tournament and win a conference title.

The Horned Frogs showed tremendous improvement in their second year in the Big 12. TCU finished the 2014 regular season in second place and swept through the 2014 Big 12 tournament, 4–0, to earn the Big 12 Tournament title. This was the first Big 12 championship won by any TCU team since joining the league on July 1, 2012. The late-season surge earned TCU a coveted National Seed for the first time in the program's long history. TCU hosted and won the 2014 Fort Worth NCAA Regional. Then, as a National Seed, TCU earned the right to host its first Super Regional. The 2014 Fort Worth NCAA Super Regional matched the TCU Horned Frogs against the Pepperdine Waves, winners of the 2014 San Luis Obispo NCAA Regional. The Horned Frogs took 2 of 3 in the Super Regional series to advance to the 2014 College World Series in Omaha, Nebraska. In this, their second CWS appearance in program history, TCU notched a 1–2 record after winning its opening games versus Texas Tech, then falling to Virginia and Ole Miss.

In 2015, TCU earned its first Big 12 Regular season Baseball Championship. The Horned Frogs were the fifth different team in as many years to win the conference title, and their victory marked the ninth time in Big 12 history that the prior year's Tournament champion went on to win the following year's regular season crown. During the regular season, head coach Jim Schlossnagle notched his 200th conference win and 500th total win as TCU's head coach. The Frogs won their second NCAA Regional of the Big 12 era by defeating North Carolina State, and then hosted and defeated Texas A&M in the 2015 Fort Worth Super Regional to advance to the 2015 College World Series. This season marked the 11th season in 12 years that TCU won either a regular season or conference tournament championship, the fifth time in seven years that the Horned Frogs advanced to a Super Regional, and the third time in six years that TCU advanced to the College World Series.

After significant roster turnover due to graduation and the MLB Draft, 2016 was expected to be a rebuilding year for the Horned Frogs, yet TCU won the 2016 Big 12 Tournament and was selected to host and won their third consecutive NCAA Regional. The Frogs advanced to the College Station Super Regional, where they defeated Texas A&M to advance to the College World Series for the third consecutive year.

On June 9, 2021, Schlossnagle was named the head baseball coach of the Texas A&M Aggies, leaving the Horned Frogs.

=== Kirk Saarloos Era ===
Schlossnagle’s longtime TCU pitching coach, Kirk Saarloos, took over the program after Schlossnagle left for Texas A&M.

In 2022, the Horned Frogs won the Big 12 regular season championship and made an appearance in the College Station Regional. Saarloos was awarded Big 12 Coach of the Year.

In 2023, the Horned Frogs finished 4th in the Big 12 regular season. They won the Big 12 Tournament championship, the Fayetteville regional against national #3 seed, Arkansas, and the Fort Worth Super regional against national #14 seed, Indiana State to clinch the program’s sixth College World Series appearance.

== TCU in the NCAA Tournament ==
Year	Record	Pct	Notes
1956	0–2	.000	District 6
1994	1–2	.333	Midwest I Regional
2004	1–2	.333	Austin Regional
2005	1–2	.333	Waco Regional
2006	1–2	.333	Norman Regional
2007	2–2	.500	Houston Regional
2008	1–2	.333	Stillwater Regional
2009	4–2	.667	Austin Super Regional, hosted Fort Worth Regional
2010	8–3	.727	College World Series 3rd place, Austin Super Regional Champions
2011	1–2	.333	Hosted Fort Worth Regional
2012	4-3	.571	Los Angeles Super Regional
2014	6–3	.667	College World Series 5th place, hosted Fort Worth Super Regional
2015	8–4	.667	College World Series 3rd place, hosted Fort Worth Super Regional
2016	7-3	.700	College World Series 3rd place, College Station Super Regional Champions
2017	8-3	.727	College World Series 3rd place, hosted Fort Worth Super Regional
2019	2-2	.500	Fayetteville Regional
2021	1-2	.333	Hosted Fort Worth Regional
2022	2-2	.500	College Station Regional
2023	7-2	.778	College World Series 3rd place, hosted Fort Worth Super Regional
2025	0-2	.000	Corvallis Regional
TOTALS	65–47	.580	

== Attendance ==
Since Lupton Stadium opened in 2003, annual total and average attendance for TCU baseball has steadily increased from approximately 1,500 fans per game to over 4,000 fans per game. The increase in attendance has coincided with the Horned Frogs’ 2010, 2014, 2015 and 2016 College World Series appearances and the 2010 Lupton Stadium seating expansion.

Total and average attendance at Lupton Stadium has ranked in the top 15 for NCAA home games since TCU's 2011 season. In 2015, TCU and Lupton ranked 8th nationally in total attendance, 10th national in average attendance, and led all private schools in the nation in total and average attendance.

Year	Home Games	Total Attendance	Natl. Rank by Total	Private School Rank by Total	Average Attendance	Natl. Rank by Average	Private School Rank by Average
2003	28	38,581	34	7	1,378	34	9
2004	28	34,657	44	9	1,238	44	9
2005	30	46,848	35	9	1,562	33	7
2006	26	40,158	43	11	1,545	38	8
2007	29	51,373	37	9	1,771	35	7
2008	33	63,959	26	6	1,938	29	6
2009	32	71,054	26	5	2,220	27	4
2010	29	90,687	22	4	3,127	19	2
2011	36	149,333	11	1	4,148	10	2
2012	32	131,610	11	1	4,112	11	2
2013	30	107,117	13	2	3,570	11	2
2014	34	121,957	12	1	3,587	13	1
2015	36	147,335	8	1	4,092	10	1
2016	31	132,796	13	1	4,284	11	1

The record attendance of 8,994 was set on June 10, 2023 when TCU hosted Indiana State in a 3-game NCAA Super Regional, surpassing the previous record of 8,812 set just one day earlier. 8,994 also set a new record for the largest crowd on a college campus for any school in Texas.

== Season-by-season results ==
Record table
Season	Coach	Overall	Conference	Standing	Postseason
Independent (1896–1922)
1896	Unknown	4–0–1			
1897	Alexander Easley	2–4			
1898	Unknown	1–0			
1899	Unknown	1–1			
1900	Unknown	2–0			
1901	Unknown	2–0			
1902	Unknown	0–2			
1903	Unknown	7–3			
1904	Unknown	7–5			
1905	Unknown	10–3			
1906	Unknown	10–3			
1907	Ellis Hardy	9–9			
1908	Ellis Hardy	20–6–2			
1909	Ellis Hardy	18–2–2			
1910	Ellis Hardy	10–1			
1911	M. A. Baldwin	8–6			
1912	Henry Lever	12–14			
1913	Kid Nance	17–5–1			
1914	Kid Nance	17–5–1			
1915	Fred Moore	1–11			
1916	Ewing Freeland	9–7			
1917	Unknown	6–4			
1918	Unknown	9–4			
1919	Fred Cahoon	12–6			
1920	Fred Cahoon	11–6–2			
1921	Kid Nance	20–2			
1922	Kid Nance	13–0			
Southwest Conference (1923–1996)
1923	Kid Nance	13–11	2–10	7th	
1924	Kid Nance	11–7	11–7	2nd	
1925	Kid Nance	9–3–2	9–3	2nd	
1926	Dutch Meyer	14–5	8–3	3rd	
1927	Dutch Meyer	7–13	7–13	4th	
1928	Dutch Meyer	7–13	6–12	4th	
1929	Dutch Meyer	8–12	8–12	4th	
1930	Dutch Meyer	13–5	13–5	2nd	
1931	Dutch Meyer	1–9–1	1–9–1	6th	
1932	Dutch Meyer	6–4	6–4	3rd	
1933	Dutch Meyer	9–1	9–1	1st	
1934	Dutch Meyer	8–6	6–6	3rd	
1935	Raymond Wolf	8–11–1	4–8	4th	
1936	Raymond Wolf	9–10	8–7	3rd	
1937	Howard Grubbs	7–9	6–9	4th	
1938	Howard Grubbs	3–11	3–11	5th	
1939	Howard Grubbs	5–11	5–11	T–4th	
1940	Walter Roach	5–10	4–10	5th	
1941	Walter Roach	1–14	1–14	6th	
1942	Walter Roach	2–13	2–12	6th	
No Team Fielded: World War II (1943–1944)
1945	Dutch Meyer	7–4	7–4	2nd	
1946	Walter Roach	3–15	3–12	6th	
1947	Walter Roach	4–15	3–12	6th	
1948	Walter Roach	8–13	1–13	6th	
1949	Walter Roach	6–14	4–9	5th	
1950	Walter Roach	14–9	7–8	4th	
1951	Walter Roach	10–11	8–7	3rd	
1952	Walter Roach	13–12	8–7	3rd	
1953	Walter Roach	7–15	2–11	6th	
1954	Walter Roach	12–13	8–7	3rd	
1955	Walter Roach	8–13–2	2–13–2	6th	
1956	Dutch Meyer	18–8	13–2	1st	NCAA District 6, L 0–2
1957	Dutch Meyer	8–4	8–4	2nd	
1958	Clyde McDowell	6–12	4–9	5th	
1959	Clyde McDowell	11–13	4–10	6th	
1960	Clyde McDowell	3–13–2	3–11	5th	
1961	Clyde McDowell	7–16	6–8	T–4th	
1962	Frank Windegger	12–11	6–9	4th	
1963	Frank Windegger	21–4	12–3	T–1st	
1964	Frank Windegger	11–12	5–8	4th	
1965	Frank Windegger	12–13	4–11	6th	
1966	Frank Windegger	21–9–1	9–6	T–1st	
1967	Frank Windegger	20–9–1	10–5	T–1st	
1968	Frank Windegger	20–9	13–5	2nd	
1969	Frank Windegger	22–8	9–6	2nd	
1970	Frank Windegger	17–15	9–8	4th	
1971	Frank Windegger	22–19	9–8	4th	
1972	Frank Windegger	29–13	12–6	T–1st	
1973	Frank Windegger	31–12	12–7	2nd	
1974	Frank Windegger	31–17	14–10	3rd	
1975	Frank Windegger	29–17	12–12	3rd	
1976	Roger Williams	22–24	8–15	8th	
1977	Willie Maxwell	22–22–1	9–13–1	7th	
1978	Willie Maxwell	18–29–1	7–17	8th	
1979	Willie Maxwell	21–24	7–17	8th	
1980	Willie Maxwell	19–28–2	7–14	7th	
1981	Willie Maxwell	27–19	9–12	6th	
1982	Willie Maxwell	16–25–2	4–15–1	8th	
1983	Willie Maxwell	26–25	6–15	7th	
1984	Bragg Stockton	25–22	6–15	T–7th	
1985	Bragg Stockton	35–17	9–12	6th	
1986	Bragg Stockton	31–29	5–16	T–7th	
1987	Lance Brown	24–35	4–17	8th	
1988	Lance Brown	27–32	8–13	5th	
1989	Lance Brown	37–22	7–14	T–6th	
1990	Lance Brown	27–32	4–17	8th	
1991	Lance Brown	34–25	10–11	T–4th	SWC Tournament, L 2–2
1992	Lance Brown	25–30	14–22	6th	
1993	Lance Brown	34–22	5–13	6th	
1994	Lance Brown	38–22	14–4	1st	SWC Tournament, L 0–2; NCAA Midwest I Regional, L 1–2
1995	Lance Brown	27–29	11–13	5th	
1996	Lance Brown	34–33	11–13	T–4th	SWC Tournament, L 1–2
Western Athletic Conference (1997–2001)
1997	Lance Brown	26–27	15–15	2nd (South)	
1998	Lance Brown	33–23	18–11	2nd (South)	WAC Tournament, L 0–2
1999	Lance Brown	32–26	19–10	2nd	WAC Tournament, L 3–2
2000	Lance Brown	22–34	12–18	5th	
2001	Lance Brown	32–28	21–15	3rd	
Conference USA (2002–2005)
2002	Lance Brown	30–29	35–22	3rd	C-USA tournament, L 1–2
2003	Lance Brown	35–22	22–8	2nd	C-USA tournament, L 0–2
2004	Jim Schlossnagle	39–26	19–11	4th	C-USA tournament, W 5–1; NCAA Austin Regional, L 1–2
2005	Jim Schlossnagle	41–20	20–10	T–2nd	C-USA tournament, W 3–0; NCAA Waco Regional, L 1–2
Mountain West Conference (2006–2012)
2006	Jim Schlossnagle	39–23	17–5	1st	MWC tournament, W 3–0; NCAA Norman Regional, L 1–2
2007	Jim Schlossnagle	48–14	20–3	1st	MWC tournament, W 3–0; NCAA Houston Regional, L 2–2
2008	Jim Schlossnagle	44–19	19–5	1st	MWC tournament, W 4–1; NCAA Stillwater Regional, L 1–2
2009	Jim Schlossnagle	40–18	15–5	1st	MWC tournament, L 1–2; NCAA Fort Worth Regional, W 3–0; NCAA Austin Super Regional, L 1–2
2010	Jim Schlossnagle	54–14	19–5	1st	MWC tournament, W 3–0; NCAA Fort Worth Regional, W 3–0; NCAA Austin Super Regional, W 2–1; NCAA College World Series, L 3–2
2011	Jim Schlossnagle	43–19	20–3	1st	MWC tournament, L 1–2; NCAA Fort Worth Regional, L 1–2
2012	Jim Schlossnagle	40–22	18–6	T–1st	MWC tournament, L 1–2; NCAA College Station Regional, W 4–1; NCAA Los Angeles Super Regional, L 0–2
Big 12 Conference (2013–present)
2013	Jim Schlossnagle	29–28	12–12	T–6th	Big 12 tournament, L 1–2
2014	Jim Schlossnagle	48–18	17–7	2nd	Big 12 tournament, W 4–0; NCAA Fort Worth Regional, W 3–0; NCAA Fort Worth Super Regional, W 2–1; NCAA College World Series, L 1–2
2015	Jim Schlossnagle	51–15	18–5	1st	Big 12 tournament, L 0–2; NCAA Fort Worth Regional, W 4–1; NCAA Fort Worth Super Regional, W 2–1; NCAA College World Series, L 2–2
2016	Jim Schlossnagle	49–18	15–9	3rd	Big 12 tournament, W 4–1; NCAA Fort Worth Regional, W 3–0; NCAA College Station Super Regional, W 2–1; NCAA College World Series, L 2–2
2017	Jim Schlossnagle	50–18	16–8	T-1st	Big 12 tournament, L 3–2; NCAA Fort Worth Regional, W 3–0; NCAA Fort Worth Super Regional, W 2–0; NCAA College World Series, L 3–2
2018	Jim Schlossnagle	33–23	10–13	6th	Big 12 tournament, L 3–1
2019	Jim Schlossnagle	34–28	11–13	6th	Big 12 tournament, L 3–2; NCAA Fayetteville Regional, L 2–2
2020	Jim Schlossnagle	11–4			Cancelled due to the COVID-19 pandemic
2021	Jim Schlossnagle	41–19	17–7	T-1st	Big 12 tournament, W 4–1; NCAA Fort Worth Regional, L 1–2
2022	Kirk Saarloos	38–22	16–8	1st	Big 12 tournament, L 1–2; NCAA College Station Regional, L 2–2
2023	Kirk Saarloos	44–24	13–11	T-4th	Big 12 tournament, W 4–0; NCAA Fayetteville Regional, W 3–0; NCAA Fort Worth Super Regional, W 2–0; NCAA College World Series, L 2–2
2024	Kirk Saarloos	33–21	14–16	9th	Big 12 tournament, L 2–2
2025	Kirk Saarloos	39–20	19–11	3rd	Big 12 tournament, L 2–1; NCAA Corvallis Regional, L 0–2
2026	Kirk Saarloos	33-21	17-13	7th	Big 12 tournament, L 0-1
Total:		2,527–1,839–25			
National champion Postseason invitational champion Conference regular season champion Conference regular season and conference tournament champion Division regular season champion Division regular season and conference tournament champion Conference tournament champion

== People ==
=== TCU Baseball All-Americans ===
Year	Position	Name	Team
1921	P	Pete Donahue	
1927	1B	Bear Wolf	
1934	P	Slim Kinzy	
1948	CF	Jim Busby	
1956	SS	Al Paschal	
1957	OF	Carl Warwick	
1963	P	Lance Brown	
1970	C	Jeff Newman	
1973	2B	Phil Turner	
1974	P	Frank Johnstone	
1985	OF	Mike Ramsey	
1988	1B	Rob Jones	
1994	1B	Adam Robson	2nd
1994	C	Darren Tawwater	3rd
1994	P	Tim Grieve	3rd
1998	3B	Royce Huffman	2nd
1999	3B	Royce Huffman	1st
2002	OF	Terry Trofholz	2nd
2003	P	Clayton Jerome	3rd
2004	P	Robbie Findlay	HM
2005	P	Lance Broadway	1st
2006	P	Jake Arrieta	2nd
2006	1B	Chad Huffman	3rd
2008	P	Andrew Cashner	3rd
2010	P	Steven Maxwell	2nd
2010	P	Matt Purke	2nd
2010	C	Bryan Holaday	2nd
2011	P	Kyle Winkler	2nd
2012	P	Preston Morrison	3rd
2014	P	Preston Morrison	2nd
2015	P	Preston Morrison	2nd
2017	C	Evan Skoug	1st

=== Other baseball awards ===
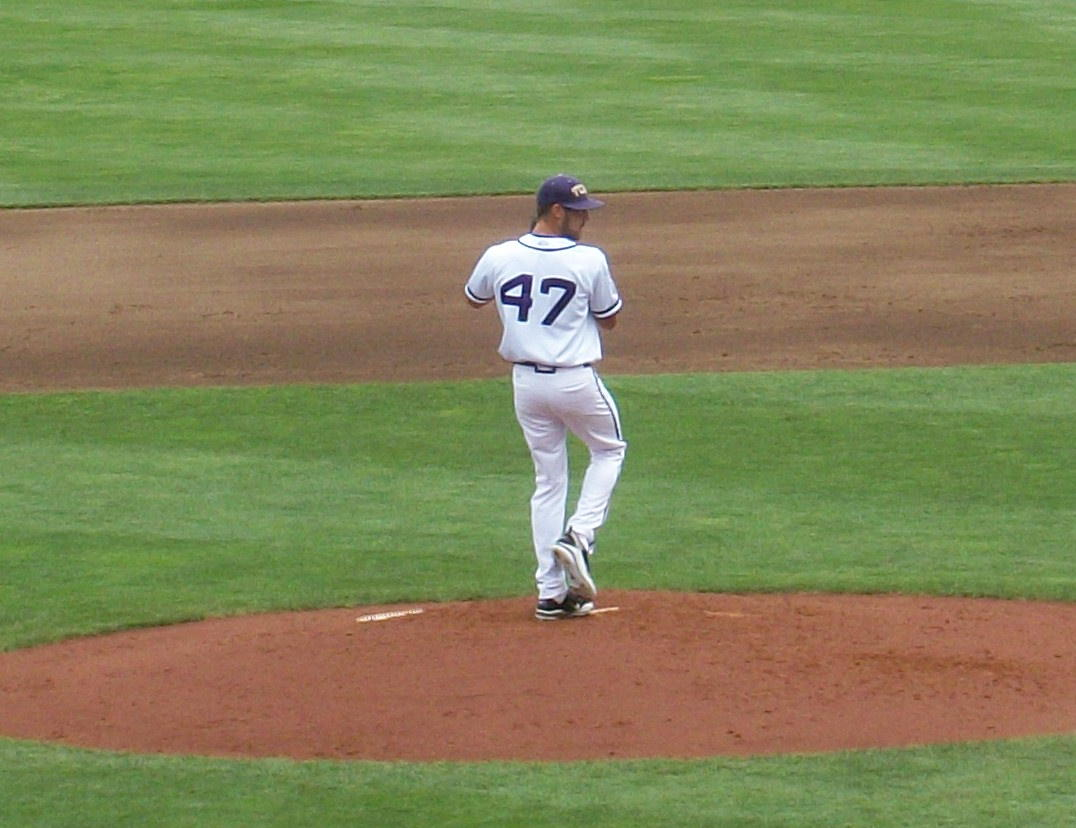
Matt Purke pitched the first game of the 2010 College World Series for the Horned Frogs.

Award	Year	Position	Name
Academic All-Americans	1992	1B	Scott Malone
Freshman All-Americans	1996	DH	Royce Huffman
Freshman All-Americans	2004	OF	Chad Huffman
Freshman All-Americans	2004	3B	Shelby Ford
Freshman All-Americans	2004	SS	Germán Durán
Freshman All-Americans	2005	DH	Matt McGuirk
Freshman All-Americans	2005	C	Andrew Walker
Freshman All-Americans	2008	P	Sean Hoelscher
Freshman All-Americans	2010	P	Matt Purke
SWC Player of the Year	1963	P	Lance Brown
SWC Player of the Year	1966	2B	Jimmy Duffy
SWC Freshman of the Year	1996	DH	Royce Huffman
WAC Player of the Year	1999	3B	Royce Huffman
C-USA Pitcher of the year	2003	P	Clayton Jerome
C-USA Pitcher of the year	2005	P	Lance Broadway
C-USA Player of the Year	2004	OF	Chad Huffman
MWC Pitcher of the Year	2006	P	Jake Arrieta
MWC Freshman of the Year	2010	P	Matt Purke
MWC Pitcher of the Year	2010	P	Steven Maxwell
Big12 Freshman of the Year	2015	1B	Conner Wanhanen
Big12 Freshman of the Year	2016	DH/P	Luken Baker
Collegiate Baseball Newspaper Collegiate Baseball Freshman Pitcher of the Year	2010	P	Matt Purke
Johnny Bench Award	2010	C	Bryan Holaday
Big 12 Conference Baseball Player of the Year	2017	C	Evan Skoug

=== Horned Frogs in Major League Baseball ===
Name	Team	Years on Team
Louis Drucke	New York Giants	1909–1912
Ona Dodd	Pittsburgh Pirates	1912
Jim Haislip	Philadelphia Phillies	1913
Claude Cooper	New York Giants	1913
Claude Cooper	Philadelphia Phillies	1916–1917
Pete Donahue	Cincinnati Reds	1921–1930
Pete Donahue	New York Giants	1930–1931
Pete Donahue	Cleveland Indians	1931
Pete Donahue	Boston Red Sox	1932
A.S. Douglass	Cincinnati Reds	1921–1925
Boob Fowler	Cincinnati Reds	1932–1925
Boob Fowler	Boston Red Sox	1926
Leo Tankersley	Chicago White Sox	1925
Bear Wolf	Cincinnati Reds	1927
Tex Carleton	St. Louis Cardinals	1932–1934
Tex Carleton	Chicago Cubs	1935–1938
Tex Carleton	Brooklyn Dodgers	1940
Slim Kinzy	Chicago White Sox	1934
L. D. Meyer	Chicago Cubs	1937
L. D. Meyer	Detroit Tigers	1940–1942
L. D. Meyer	Cleveland Indians	1945–1946
Randy Jackson	Chicago Cubs	1950–1955
Randy Jackson	Chicago Cubs	1959
Randy Jackson	Brooklyn Dodgers	1956–1957
Randy Jackson	Los Angeles Dodgers	1958
Randy Jackson	Cleveland Indians	1958–1959
Jim Busby	Chicago White Sox	1950–1952
Jim Busby	Chicago White Sox	1955
Jim Busby	Washington Senators	1952–1955
Jim Busby	Cleveland Indians	1956–1957
Jim Busby	Baltimore Orioles	1957–1958
Jim Busby	Baltimore Orioles	1960–1961
Jim Busby	Boston Red Sox	1959–1960
Jim Busby	Houston Colt .45s	1962
Carl Warwick	Los Angeles Dodgers	1961
Carl Warwick	St. Louis Cardinals	1961–1962
Carl Warwick	St. Louis Cardinals	1964–1965
Carl Warwick	Houston Colt .45s	1962–1963
Carl Warwick	Baltimore Orioles	1965
Carl Warwick	Chicago Cubs	1966
Tommy Gramly	Cleveland Indians	1968
Chuck Machemehl	Cleveland Indians	1971
Jeff Newman	Oakland Athletics	1976–1982
Jeff Newman	Boston Red Sox	1983–1984
Freddie Benavides	Cincinnati Reds	1991–1992
Freddie Benavides	Colorado Rockies	1993
Freddie Benavides	Montreal Expos	1994
Tim Mauser	Philadelphia Phillies	1991,1993
Tim Mauser	San Diego Padres	1993–1995
John Briscoe	Oakland A's	1991–1996
Chris Eddy	Oakland A's	1995
Glenn Dishman	San Diego Padres	1995–1996
Glenn Dishman	Philadelphia Phillies	1996
Glenn Dishman	Detroit Tigers	1997
Jeff Zimmerman	Texas Rangers	1999–2001
Scott Atchison	Seattle Mariners	2004–2005
Scott Atchison	San Francisco Giants	2007
Scott Atchison	Boston Red Sox	2010–2012
Scott Atchison	New York Mets	2013
Scott Atchison	Cleveland Indians	2014–2015
Lance Broadway	Chicago White Sox	2007–2009
Lance Broadway	New York Mets	2009
Yovani Gallardo	Milwaukee Brewers	2007–2015
Yovani Gallardo	Texas Rangers	2015
Yovani Gallardo	Baltimore Orioles	2016
Yovani Gallardo	Seattle Mariners	2017
Yovani Gallardo	Cincinnati Reds	2018
Yovani Gallardo	Texas Rangers	2018
Geno Espineli	San Francisco Giants	2008
Andrew Cashner	Chicago Cubs	2010–2011
Andrew Cashner	San Diego Padres	2012–2016
Andrew Cashner	Miami Marlins	2016
Andrew Cashner	Texas Rangers	2017
Andrew Cashner	Baltimore Orioles	2018–2019
Andrew Cashner	Boston Red Sox	2019
Jake Arrieta	Baltimore Orioles	2010–2013
Jake Arrieta	Chicago Cubs	2013–2017, 2021
Jake Arrieta	Philadelphia Phillies	2018–2020
Jake Arrieta	San Diego Padres	2021
Chad Huffman	New York Yankees	2010
Chad Huffman	St. Louis Cardinals	2017
Sam Demel	Arizona Diamondbacks	2010–2012
Matt Carpenter	St. Louis Cardinals	2011–2021, 2024
Matt Carpenter	New York Yankees	2022
Matt Carpenter	San Diego Padres	2023
Bryan Holaday	Detroit Tigers	2012–2015
Bryan Holaday	Texas Rangers	2016
Bryan Holaday	Boston Red Sox	2016
Bryan Holaday	Detroit Tigers	2017
Bryan Holaday	Miami Marlins	2018–2019
Bryan Holaday	Baltimore Orioles	2020
Bryan Holaday	Arizona Diamondbacks	2021
Brandon Finnegan	Kansas City Royals	2014–2015
Brandon Finnegan	Cincinnati Reds	2015–2018
Taylor Featherston	Los Angeles Angels	2015
Taylor Featherston	Philadelphia Phillies	2016
Taylor Featherston	Tampa Bay Rays	2017
Matt Purke	Chicago White Sox	2016
Jason Coats	Chicago White Sox	2016
Nick Lodolo	Cincinnati Reds	2022–
Brandon Williamson	Cincinnati Reds	2023–
Luken Baker	St. Louis Cardinals	2023–

== See also ==
- List of NCAA Division I baseball programs
