= Brad Emaus =

American baseball player (born 1986)

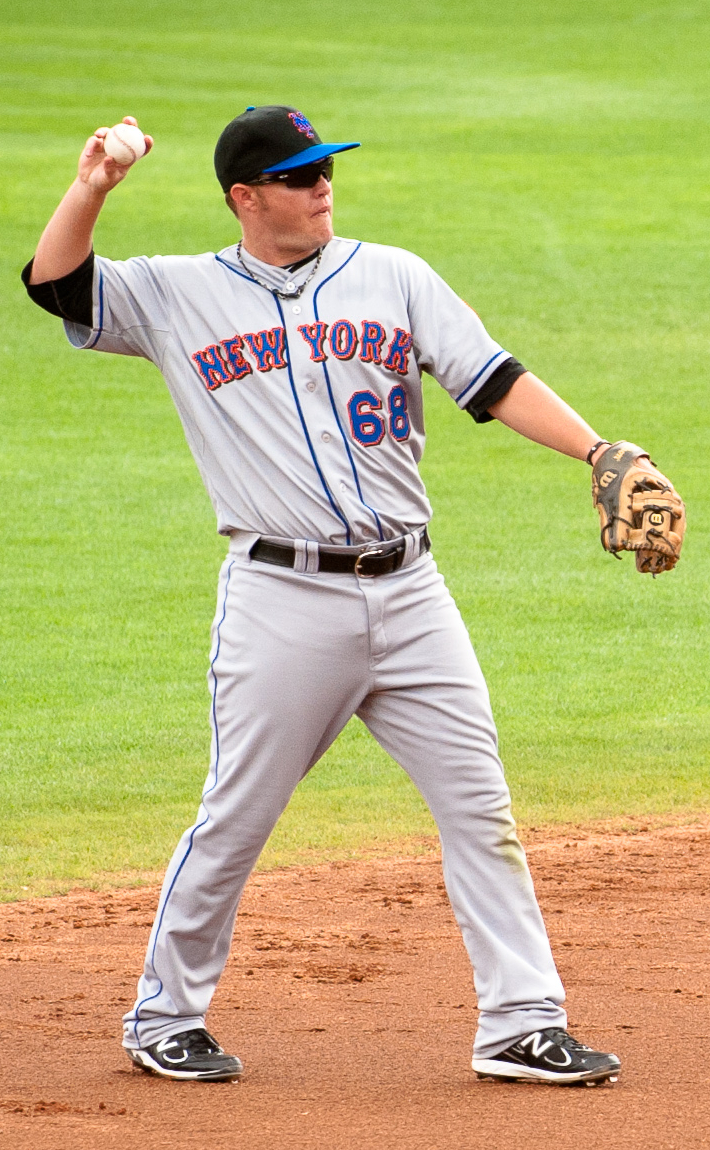
- Emaus with the New York Mets
- Second baseman
- Born: March 28, 1986 (age 40); Kalamazoo, Michigan, U.S.
- Batted: Right Threw: Right

MLB debut
- April 1, 2011, for the New York Mets

Last MLB appearance
- April 17, 2011, for the New York Mets

MLB statistics
- Batting average: .162
- Home runs: 0
- Runs batted in: 1
- Stats at Baseball Reference

Teams
- New York Mets (2011)

Bradley Mark Emaus (born March 28, 1986) is an American former professional baseball second baseman. He played in Major League Baseball (MLB) for the New York Mets.

== College career ==
Drafted by the Atlanta Braves in the 18th round of 2004 Major League Baseball draft out of East Coweta High School in Sharpsburg, Georgia, Emaus instead elected to enroll at Tulane University. Playing for the Tulane Green Wave baseball team, he started every game his first two seasons, playing mostly third base and some first base. In 2005, his freshman season, he was named to the All-Conference USA Tournament Team. In 2006, he played collegiate summer baseball in the Cape Cod Baseball League for the Yarmouth-Dennis Red Sox and was named a league all-star. In his junior season, he continued to play well — albeit displaying less extra base power — at second base, and re-entered the draft, this time being selected by the Toronto Blue Jays in the eleventh round.

== Professional career ==
=== Toronto Blue Jays ===
In 2009, the Blue Jays had also assigned him to play in the Arizona Fall League. By 2010, Emaus has batted .276 in his minor league career, with a .364 on-base percentage, and a .426 slugging percentage, reaching as high 89 games with the Las Vegas 51s of the AAA Pacific Coast League. As a minor leaguer, he has mostly played second base, with a small amount of time also logged at third.

A good performance in Arizona, along with his AAA statistics and a solid showing (.978 OPS) for the Blue Jays in spring training 2010, suggested he was a good candidate to become a major league player, but the Blue Jays did not include him on their 40-man roster, thus exposing him to the Rule 5 Draft. The Mets, thin at second base with the disappointing performance and questionable health of Luis Castillo at second base for them in 2011, chose Emaus in the first round of the draft.

=== New York Mets ===
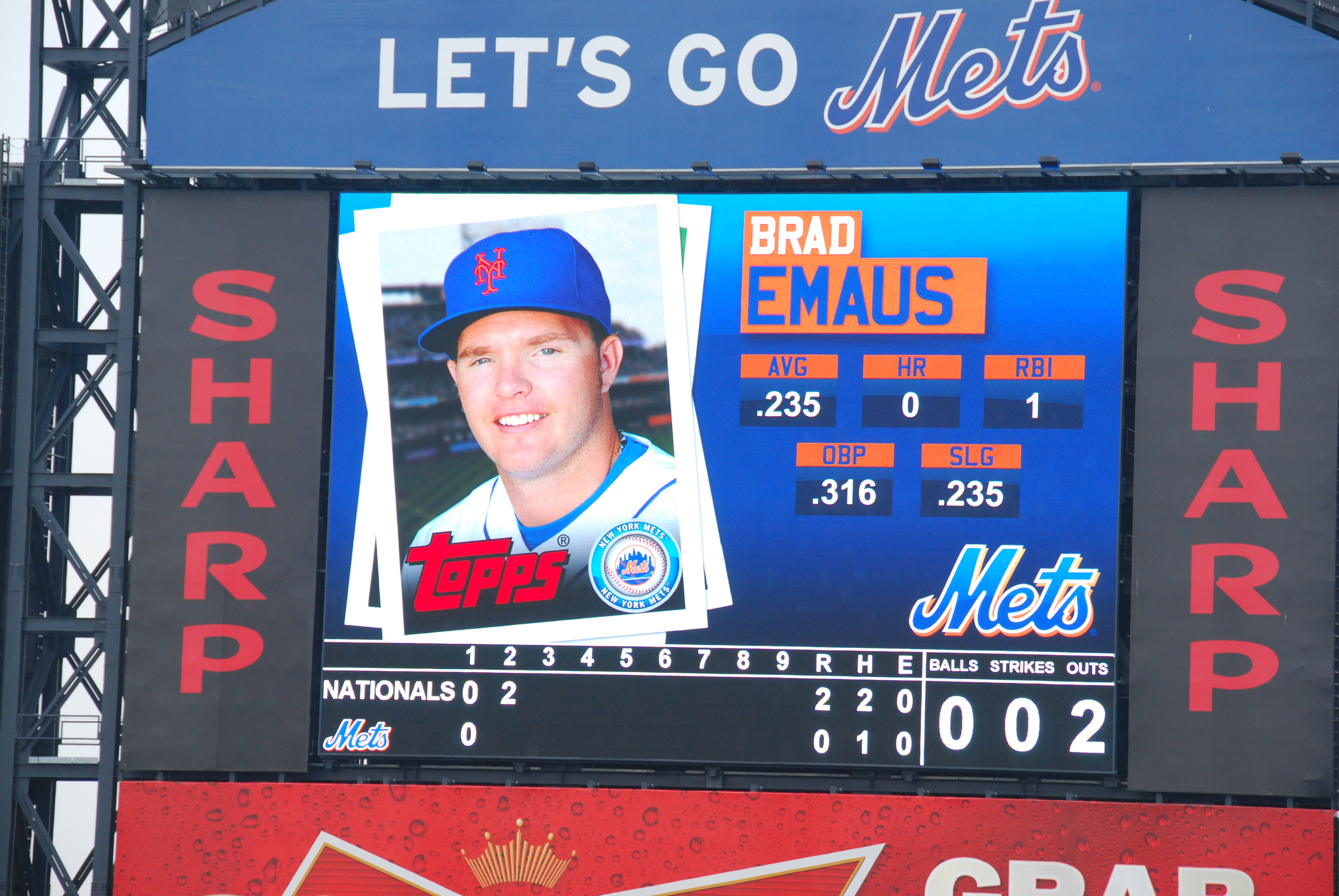
Brad Emaus in a game in 2011.

Coming to the Mets in this manner, Emaus had to remain on their major league 25-man roster for the duration of 2011, or else be offered back to the Blue Jays. Emaus won the Mets second base competition during 2011 Spring Training. He was the Opening Day starter, making his major league debut on April 1. On April 19, the Mets designated Emaus for assignment.

=== Colorado Rockies ===
On April 21, 2011, after clearing waivers, Emaus was returned to the Toronto Blue Jays. However, the next day he was traded to the Colorado Rockies for RHP Chris Malone and a player to be named later.

=== Boston Red Sox ===
On January 11, 2012, Emaus was traded to the Boston Red Sox for a player to be named later or cash considerations. Less than three months later, on April 4, he was released.

=== Laredo Lemurs ===
He subsequently signed with the Laredo Lemurs of the American Association of Independent Professional Baseball on April 18, 2012.

=== Return to New York Mets ===
On April 25, 2012 Emaus signed a minor league contract with the New York Mets to play for the Buffalo Bisons, their AAA affiliate.

== Post-playing career ==
Following his playing career, Emaus opened up 643 Hitting Academy in his residence of Monroe, Louisiana.

== See also ==
- Rule 5 draft results
