= 2008 Mountain West Conference baseball tournament =

- Teams: 6
- Format: Double-elimination
- Finals site: Lupton Stadium; Fort Worth, TX
- Champions: TCU (3rd title)
- MVP: Clint Arnold (TCU)
- Television: Mountiain/CBS Sports Network

2008 Mountain West Conference baseball standings
	Conf.				Overall
Team	W		L	PCT	W		L	PCT
No. 26 TCU ‍†‍‡‍^{y}	19	–	5	.792	44	–	19	.698
New Mexico ‍‍‍	16	–	8	.667	34	–	25	.576
San Diego State ‍‍‍	16	–	8	.667	31	–	28	.525
Utah ‍‍‍	10	–	14	.417	26	–	28	.481
BYU ‍‍‍	10	–	14	.417	22	–	36	.379
UNLV ‍‍‍	9	–	15	.375	22	–	37	.373
Air Force ‍‍‍	4	–	20	.167	18	–	33	.353
† – Conference champion ‡ – Tournament champion y – Invited to the 2008 NCAA Division I baseball tournament As of June 8, 2008; Rankings from Collegiate Baseball

The 2008 Mountain West Conference baseball tournament took place from May 20–24. The top six regular season finishers of the league's seven teams met in the double-elimination tournament held at Texas Christian University's Lupton Stadium. Top seeded TCU won their third consecutive and third overall Mountain West Conference Baseball Championship with a championship game score of 15–2 and earned the conference's automatic bid to the NCAA Division I baseball tournament.

== Seeding ==
The top six finishers from the regular season were seeded based on conference winning percentage. Only six teams participate, so Air Force was not in the field. New Mexico claimed the second seed over San Diego State by winning the season series. BYU claimed the fourth seed by winning the season series over Utah.

Team	W	L	Pct.	GB	Seed
TCU	19	5	.792	–	1
New Mexico	16	8	.667	3	2
San Diego State	16	8	.667	3	3
BYU	10	14	.417	9	4
Utah	10	14	.417	9	5
UNLV	9	15	.375	10	6
Air Force	4	20	.167	15	–

== Results ==
Upper round 1	Upper round 2	Upper final	Final
1	TCU	9
3	San Diego State	2	6	UNLV	3
6	UNLV	6	1	TCU	2
2	New Mexico	3
2	New Mexico	8
4	BYU	3	5	Utah	2
5	Utah	9
2	New Mexico	2	2
1	TCU	9	15
Lower round 1	Lower round 2	Lower round 3	Lower final
1	TCU	6
6	UNLV	4	5	Utah	3
5	Utah	1	5	Utah	7
3	San Diego State	1	3	San Diego State	0
4	BYU	0

== All-Tournament Team ==
Name	POS	Team
Mike Brownstein	2B	New Mexico
Stephen Smith	P	New Mexico
Clint Arnold	OF	TCU
Matt Carpenter	3B	TCU
Bryan Kervin	SS	TCU
Matt Vern	1B	TCU
J. J. Sferra	OF	UNLV
Dustin Hennis	OF	Utah
John James	P	Utah
Cody Guymon	DH	Utah
Andrew Cashner	RP	TCU

=== Most Valuable Player ===
Clint Arnold, an outfielder for the champion TCU Horned Frogs, was named the tournament most valuable player.
