= Schroeder Park =

Baseball park at the University of Houston in Texas, US

Darryl & Lori Schroeder Park
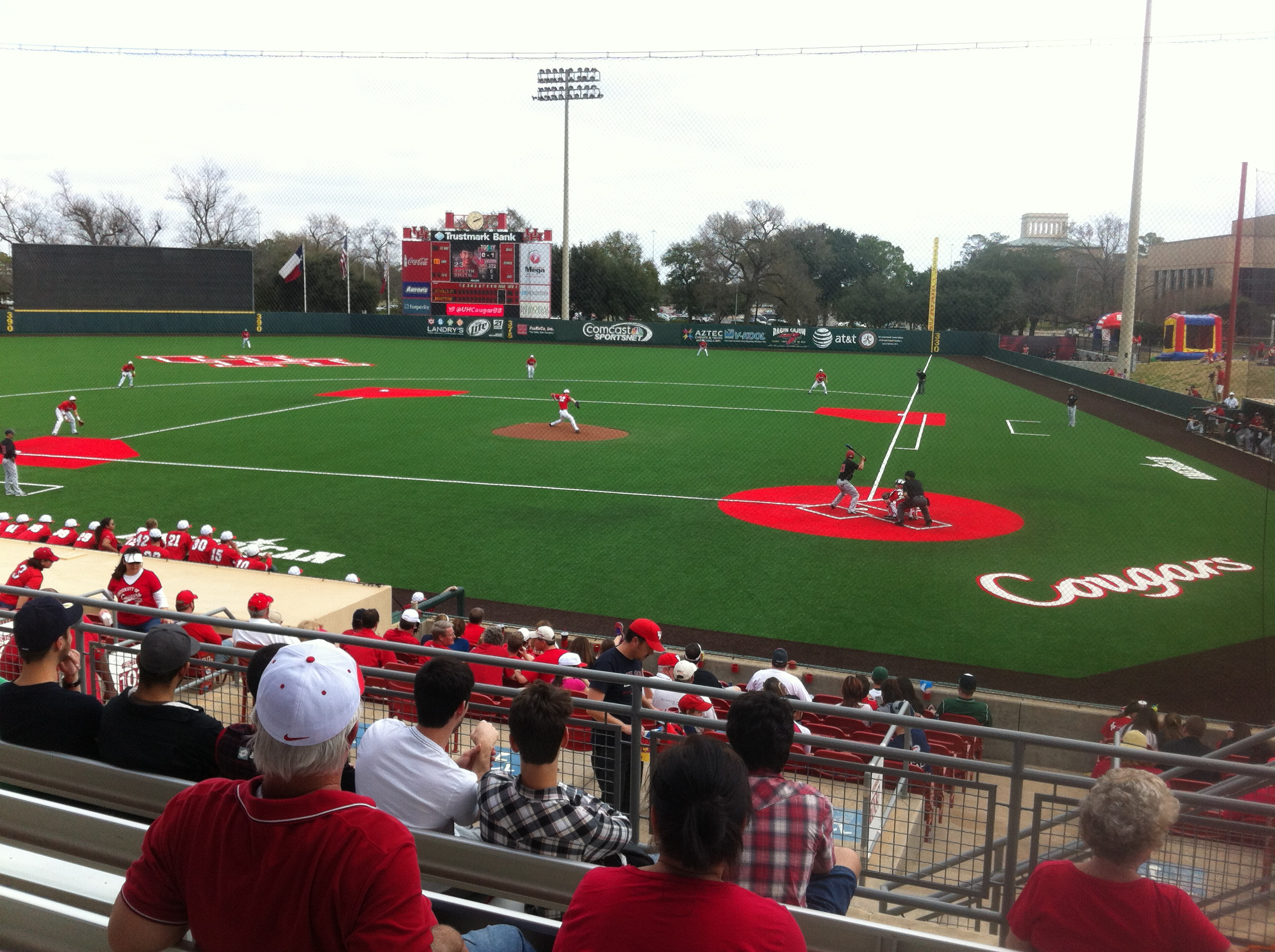
- Interactive map of Darryl & Lori Schroeder Park
- Location: 3100 Cullen Blvd; Houston, Texas; United States
- Coordinates: 29.7267°N 95.3452°W
- Owner: University of Houston System
- Operator: University of Houston
- Capacity: 5,000
- Surface: Natural grass (1995–2014); FieldTurf (2014–present)
- Field size: Left Field: 330 ft (100 m); Center Field: 400 ft (122 m); Right Field: 330 ft (100 m)

Construction
- Groundbreaking: 1994
- Opened: February 22, 1995
- Renovated: 2013
- Cost: US$30 million

Tenants
- Houston Cougars baseball (NCAA) 1995–present Texas Arrow Heads (Pro Cricket) 2004

Darryl & Lori Schroeder Park (formerly known as Cougar Field) is a baseball park in Houston, Texas. It is the home field of the Houston Cougars baseball team. Several iterations of the ballpark have existed. The current stadium holds 5,000 people, and opened for baseball in 1995. With a 1,500 square foot Daktronics video board, Schroeder Park features the second-largest scoreboard in college baseball. Since its opening, Schroeder Park has hosted several notable college baseball events. In February 2016, the University of Houston announced that, as a response to a large donation to the baseball program, Cougar Field would be renamed Darryl & Lori Schroeder Park.

== History ==
Prior to 1961, the Cougars played at Buff Stadium. The original baseball stadium named Cougar Field was built roughly in the same area as the current one. Before 1968, it existed where Hofheinz Pavilion is today. To make room for the then new basketball arena, Cougar Field was moved next door. This iteration of Cougar Field stayed in the same location until March 29, 1994, when it was demolished in preparation for the establishment of the UH Athletics/Alumni center. To finish the rest of their season's home games, the Cougars played at Texas A&M University's Olsen Field and crosstown Rice University's Cameron Field. After a multimillion-dollar donation from Cougar alumnus and San Diego Padres owner John Moores, the current stadium was built throughout the remainder of the year, and had its first game on February 22, 1995.

In late 2013, Houston, citing national competitiveness in recruiting, changed Schroeder Park's playing surface from natural grass to artificial turf. In September 2015, Houston announced a new 20,000 square foot clubhouse and player development center to be constructed for Schroeder Park. In October 2015, a new Daktronics video board with 1,500 square feet of space replaced the original one, and Schroeder Park became host to the largest scoreboard in college baseball.

== Events hosted ==
Since its opening in 1995, Schroeder Park has hosted several notable college baseball events. In, 1999, 2000, 2015, and 2017 an NCAA Regional was hosted at the ball park. Also in 2000, Schroeder Park was home to an NCAA Super Regional. In addition, the 2004 and 2010 Conference USA baseball tournaments were both hosted at the ballpark.

In 2014, the USA Baseball 18U National Team held trials at the ballpark.

== Features ==
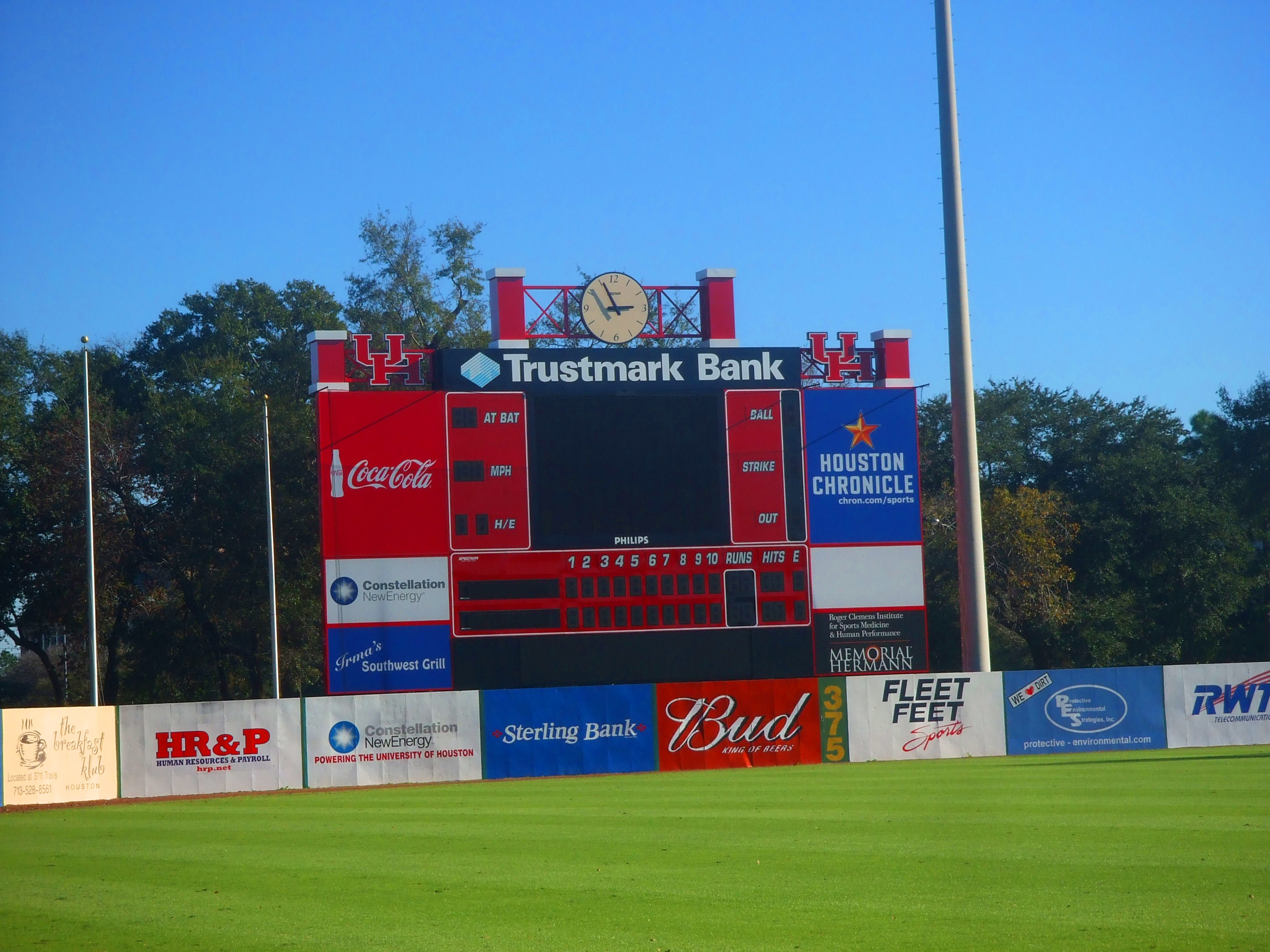
Schroeder Park's former Philips Vidiwall scoreboard

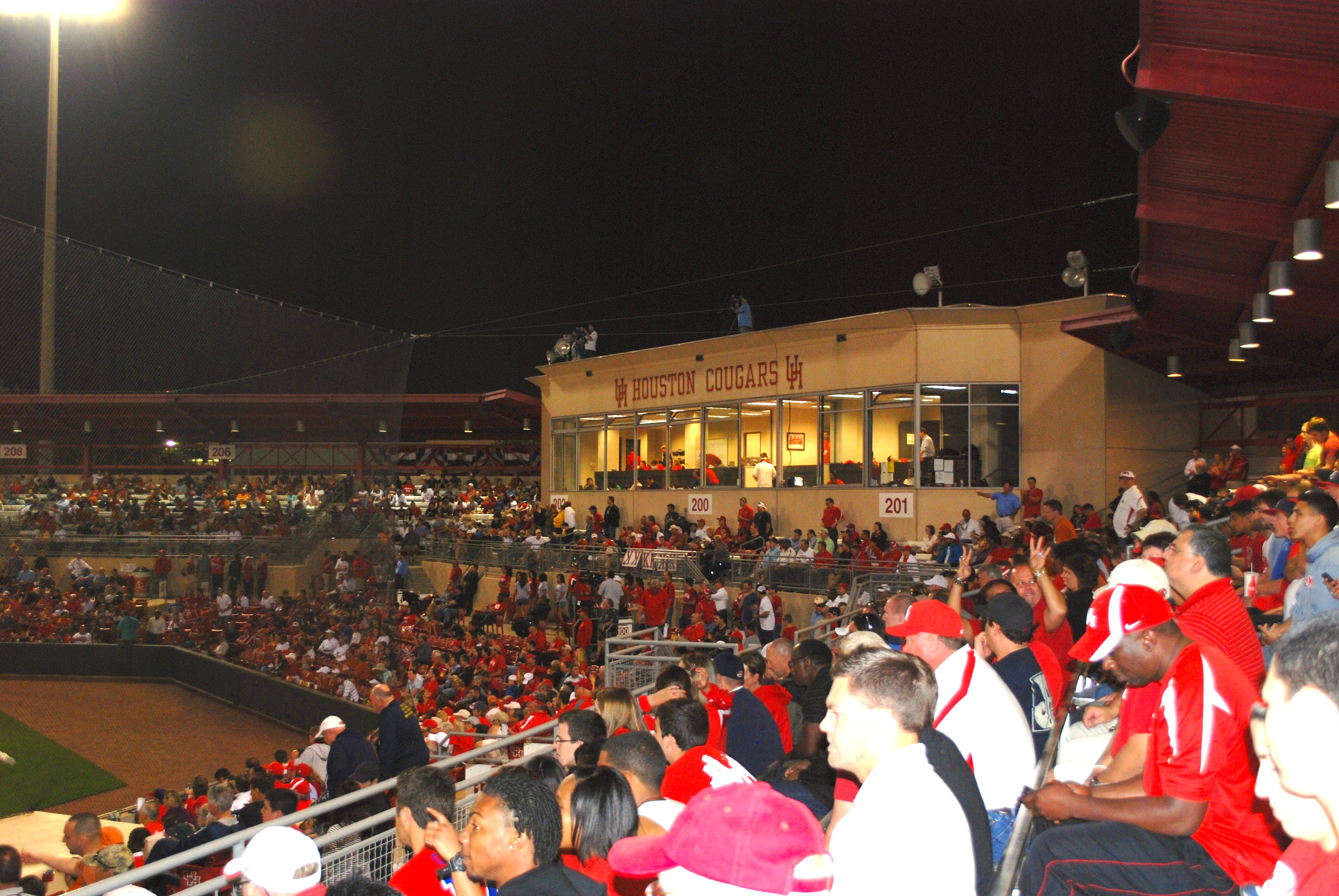
Schroeder Park stands and press box during a game

Schroeder Park is a scaled-down version of a major league ballpark. Until October 2015, it featured a scoreboard with a Philips Vidiwall LED video screen constructed by Spectrum Corporation. It was replaced by a Daktronics video board, known as the "Sanders-Gutierrez Scoreboard", which is the second-largest in college baseball (behind only Arkansas' Baum Stadium). Schroeder Park seats up to 5,000 spectators, with most of the seats covered by a canopy roof.

For players, in addition to locker rooms, there are facilities for indoor batting practice, storage, and laundry. Schroeder Park's press box seats 28, and has booths for television and radio coverage. The field is made of artificial turf, which can increase the running speed, but can also increase injuries as compared to natural grass.

== See also ==
- List of NCAA Division I baseball venues
