= Lupton Stadium =

Baseball stadium in Fort Worth, Texas

Coordinates: 32.703136°N 97.372467°W

Lupton Baseball Stadium & Williams-Riley Field
- Lupton Stadium
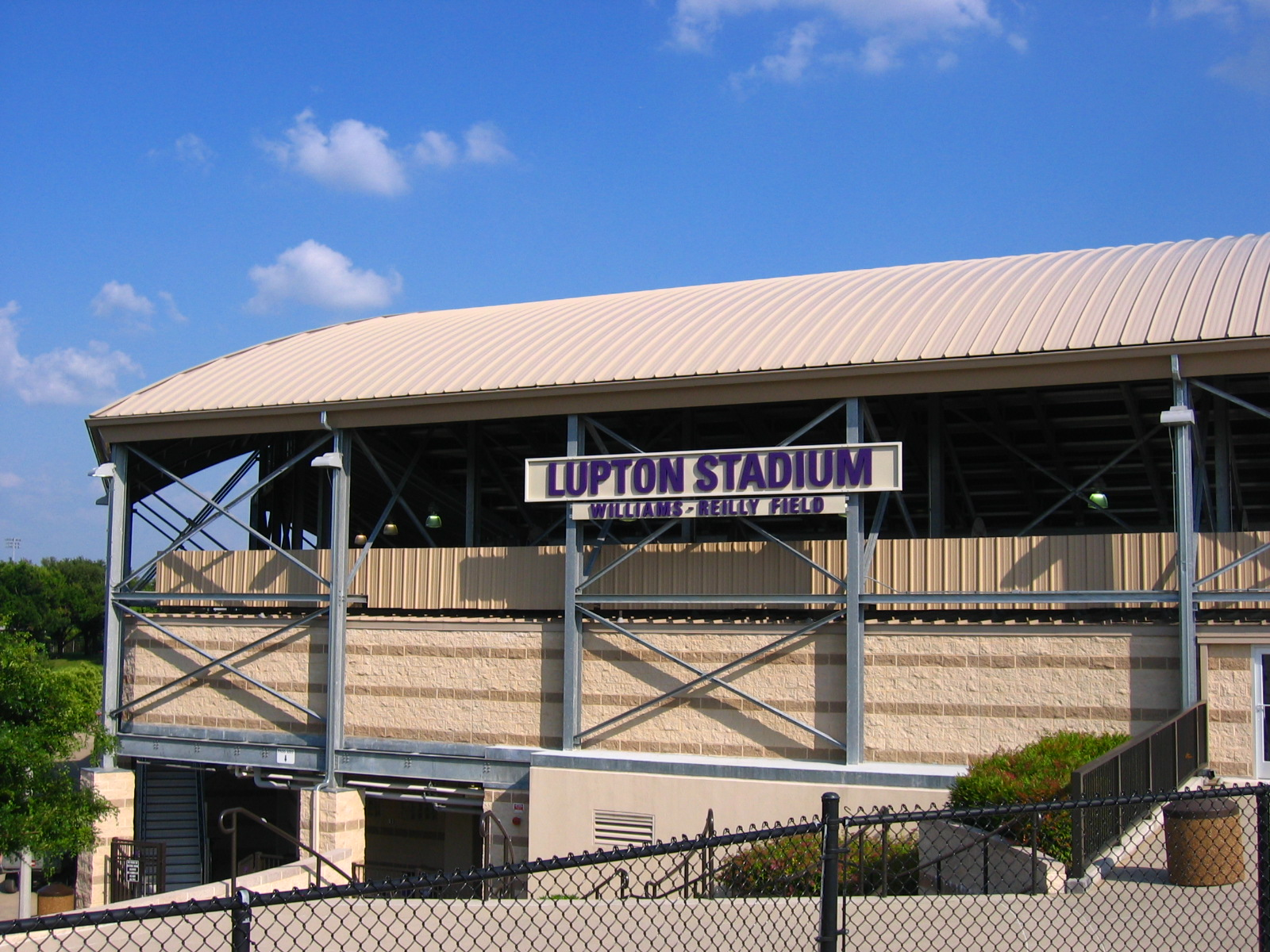
- Lupton Stadium Entrance
- Interactive map of Lupton Baseball Stadium & Williams-Riley Field
- Location: 3700 Berry St. Fort Worth, TX
- Owner: Texas Christian University
- Operator: Texas Christian University
- Capacity: 4,500
- Surface: Bermuda TIFF 419
- Field size: Left Field - 330ft (100m); Left-Center Field - 389ft (118m); Center Field - 400ft (122m); Right-Center Field - 382ft (116m); Right Field - 330ft (100m)

Construction
- Groundbreaking: October 18, 2001
- Opened: February 2, 2003
- Renovated: 2014, 2016
- Expanded: 2010
- Cost: Original: $7 million 2010 expansion: $1 million 2015 addition: $2.5 million 2016 addition: $8 million
- Architect: Leo A. Daly Architects
- Main contractor: Austin Commercial

Tenant
- TCU Horned Frogs baseball (NCAA) (2003–Present)

Charlie and Marie Lupton Baseball Stadium and Williams-Reilly Field is a baseball stadium located on the campus of Texas Christian University (TCU) in Fort Worth, Texas. It has been the home field of the TCU Horned Frogs baseball team since its opening on February 2, 2003.

== History ==
Lupton Stadium, the home of TCU Horned Frogs baseball, opened in 2003 and replaced the TCU Diamond, the Horned Frogs' home from 1962 to 2002. The TCU Diamond was adjacent to Amon G. Carter Stadium and Schollmaier Arena, where the Sam Baugh Indoor Practice Facility is now located.

The playing surface features the latest technology in field maintenance, including a Bermuda TIFF 419 surface. The dugouts are heated with Major League Baseball-style bat and helmet racks while a spacious home-and-visitor bullpen areas are located outside the field of play. The original $7 million stadium is a two-tiered complex with three suites, offices, two radio booths, press box, ticket office, home and visiting team locker rooms, and general player and fan facilities.

=== 2009–10 Seating Expansion ===
In 2010, a $1 million project expanded upper-deck seating to bring the total capacity to 9,000 and added an auxiliary scoreboard along the first base line. Later, partially shaded party patios were constructed in the right field corner; these patios can be reserved by fans who may bring in food and beverages, including beer and wine, to the patios.

=== 2014–15 Player Development Center Addition ===
Additions and renovations in 2014 and 2015 totaled $2.5 million and added the G. Malcolm Louden Player Development Center for Baseball, a 9,000 square-foot indoor/outdoor practice facility. The renovation added indoor batting cages and a field turf outdoor practice space, and moved the home bullpen to beyond the left-center field fence.

=== 2015–16 Player, Coach & Alumni Facilities Additions ===
An $8 million construction and renovation project in 2015–16 added a new player facility on the third base line to house a new home team locker room, team lounge, sports medicine center, equipment room, team classroom, coaches' offices and an alumni locker room; this project also included the addition of a new 40' x 23' video scoreboard in left-center field and the installation of new outfield fences and a general-admission grass berm beyond the right field wall (photo gallery).

=== Future Renovations ===
An additional phase of stadium renovations is planned to renovate in-stadium fan amenities, including widening the stadium concourses, renovating suites, constructing new restrooms and concessions and renovating the main entrance.

== TCU Baseball Attendance ==
Annual total and average attendance at Lupton Stadium attendance has steadily increased since the venue opened in 2003, from approximately 1,500 fans per game to over 4,000 fans per game. The increase in attendance has coincided with the Horned Frogs’ 2010, 2014, 2015 and 2016 College World Series appearances and the 2010 Lupton Stadium seating expansion.

Total and average attendance at Lupton Stadium has ranked in the top 15 for NCAA home games since TCU's 2011 season. In 2015, TCU and Lupton ranked 8th nationally in total attendance, 10th national in average attendance, and led all private schools in the nation in total and average attendance.

| Year | Home Games | Total Attendance | Natl. Rank by Total | Private School Rank by Total | Average Attendance | Natl. Rank by Average | Private School Rank by Average |
|---|---|---|---|---|---|---|---|
| 2003 | 28 | 38,581 | 34 | 7 | 1,378 | 34 | 9 |
| 2004 | 28 | 34,657 | 44 | 9 | 1,238 | 44 | 9 |
| 2005 | 30 | 46,848 | 35 | 9 | 1,562 | 33 | 7 |
| 2006 | 26 | 40,158 | 43 | 11 | 1,545 | 38 | 8 |
| 2007 | 29 | 51,373 | 37 | 9 | 1,771 | 35 | 7 |
| 2008 | 33 | 63,959 | 26 | 6 | 1,938 | 29 | 6 |
| 2009 | 32 | 71,054 | 26 | 5 | 2,220 | 27 | 4 |
| 2010 | 29 | 90,687 | 22 | 4 | 3,127 | 19 | 2 |
| 2011 | 36 | 149,333 | 11 | 1 | 4,148 | 10 | 2 |
| 2012 | 32 | 131,610 | 11 | 1 | 4,112 | 11 | 2 |
| 2013 | 30 | 107,117 | 13 | 2 | 3,570 | 11 | 2 |
| 2014 | 34 | 121,957 | 12 | 1 | 3,587 | 13 | 1 |
| 2015 | 36 | 147,335 | 8 | 1 | 4,092 | 10 | 1 |
| 2016 | 31 | 132,796 | 13 | 1 | 4,284 | 11 | 1 |

The record attendance of 8,994 was set in 2023 when TCU hosted Indiana State in a 3-game NCAA Super Regional, with each game's total attendance exceeding 8,000.

== Other Events ==
In addition to serving as the home of TCU Horned Frogs baseball, Lupton Stadium hosts Jim Schlossnagle's baseball camps and other special events for high school and club teams annually. The venue has also hosted the following Mountain West Conference tournaments, NCAA Regional tournaments and NCAA Super Regional tournaments:

- MWC baseball tournament: 2008, 2009
- NCAA Division I baseball tournament Regional: 2009, 2010, 2011, 2014, 2015, 2016, 2017, 2021
- NCAA Division I baseball tournament Super Regional: 2014, 2015, 2017, 2023

== See also ==
- List of NCAA Division I baseball venues
