= Geno Espineli =

American baseball player (born 1982)

- Starting pitcher
- Born: September 8, 1982 (age 43); Houston, Texas, U.S.
- Batted: Left Threw: Left

MLB debut
- July 20, 2008, for the San Francisco Giants

Last MLB appearance
- September 24, 2008, for the San Francisco Giants

MLB statistics
- Win–loss record: 2–0
- Earned run average: 5.06
- Strikeouts: 8
- Stats at Baseball Reference

Teams
- San Francisco Giants (2008)
Medals
Men's baseball
Representing United States
Baseball World Cup
Gold medal – first place	2009 Nettuno	National team

Eugene Macalalag "Geno" Espineli (born September 8, 1982) is an American former Major League Baseball relief pitcher for the San Francisco Giants.

== Early life ==
Espineli was born in Houston, Texas to Filipino parents born in the Philippines who migrated to the United States. He also has two older sisters who were also born in Houston, Lorene and Theresa. Lorene is a mathematics teacher at the Bentley School in Lafayette, California.

== Career ==
Espineli played college baseball for the Texas Longhorns and TCU Horned Frogs. With TCU, he was named to the All-Conference USA Tournament Team in 2004. In 2002 and 2003, he played collegiate summer baseball with the Cotuit Kettleers of the Cape Cod Baseball League. He was drafted by the San Francisco Giants in the 14th round of the 2004 Major League Baseball draft.

A full-time reliever in his first two professional seasons, Espineli started some games for Double-A Connecticut in 2006 and became a full-time starter for Connecticut in 2007. Espineli, a reliever again in 2008, started the season with the Triple-A Fresno Grizzlies. He was named a PCL All-star and also to the U.S. Olympic team before being called up to the majors on July 20. He made his debut that same day, pitching one scoreless inning.

When Espineli made his debut with San Francisco on July 23, 2008, with 0.2 innings of perfect relief against the visiting Washington Nationals, many believe he became the first full-blooded Filipino to ever play in the major leagues.

Espineli signed a minor league contract with an invitation to 2011 spring training with the Colorado Rockies. On May 13, 2011, Espinelli signed a minor league contract with the San Francisco Giants. He finished the season with the Fresno Grizzlies and retired after the season.
