= Jim Schlossnagle =

American baseball coach (born 1970)

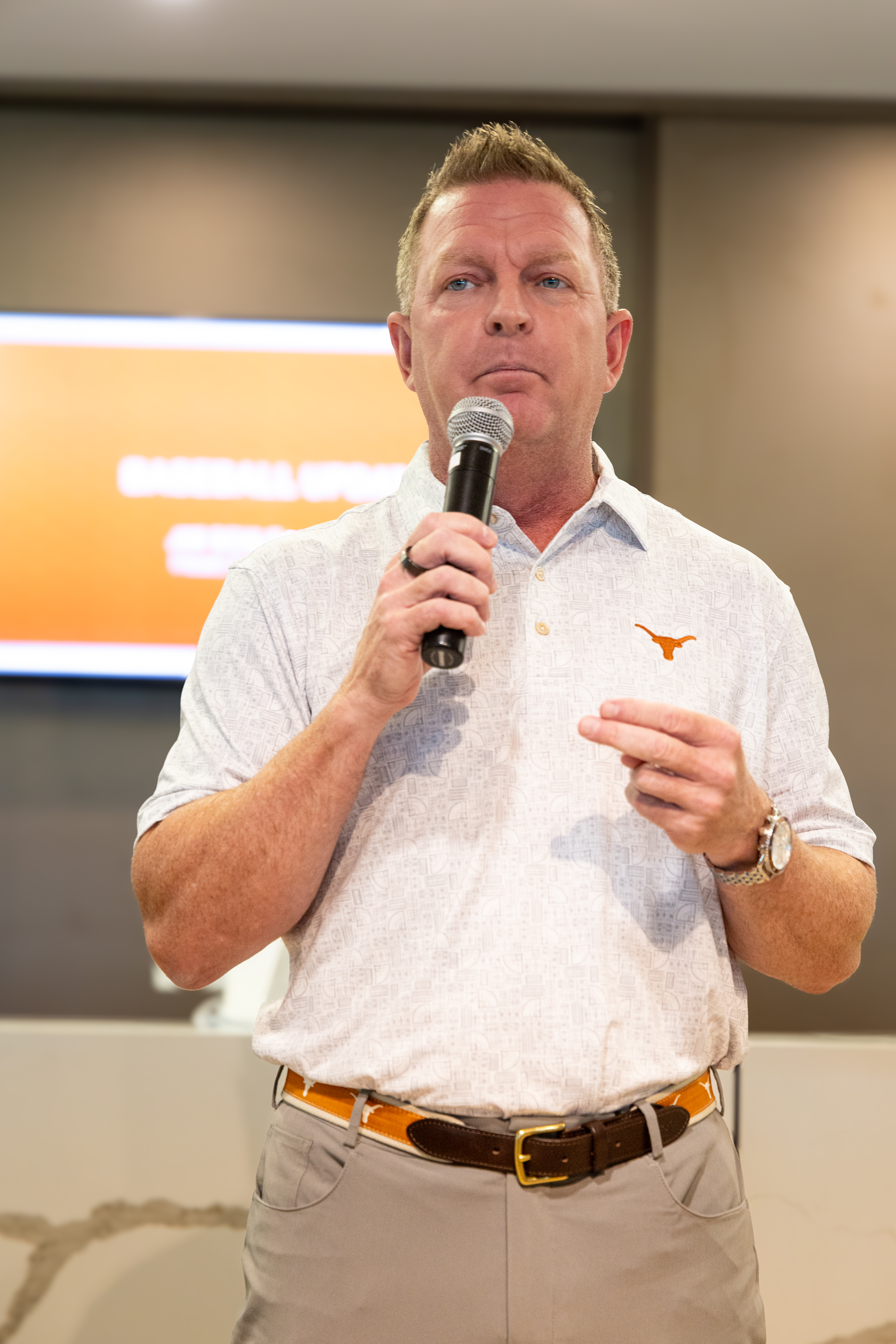
- Schlossnagle answers questions at a university event in 2024

Current position
- Title: Head coach
- Team: Texas
- Conference: SEC
- Record: 90–29

Biographical details
- Born: August 12, 1970 (age 56); Hagerstown, Maryland, U.S.

Playing career
- 1986–1989: Elon
- Position: Pitcher

Coaching career (HC unless noted)
- 1990–1992: Elon (assistant)
- 1993: Clemson (assistant)
- 1994–2001: Tulane (associate HC)
- 2002–2003: UNLV
- 2004–2021: TCU
- 2022–2024: Texas A&M
- 2025–present: Texas

Head coaching record
- Overall: 1,033–479
- Tournaments: 86–48 (NCAA)

Accomplishments and honors

Championships
- SEC West Division: (2022); SEC: (2025); 3 Big 12: (2015, 2017, 2021); 3 Big 12 Tournament: (2014, 2016, 2021); 7 MWC: (2006–2012); 5 MWC Tournament: (2003, 2006–2008, 2010); 2 C-USA Tournament: (2004, 2005); 8 NCAA Super Regional: (2010, 2014–2017, 2022, 2024, 2026); 11 NCAA Regional: (2009, 2010, 2012, 2014–2017, 2021, 2022, 2024, 2026)

Awards
- Baseball America National Coach of the Year: 2016; NCBWA National Coach of the Year: 2010; FieldTurf National Coach of the Year: 2010; SEC Coach of the Year (2025); Big 12 Coach of the Year: 2015; 7 MWC Coach of the Year: (2003, 2006–2011)

Jim Schlossnagle (born August 12, 1970) is an American college baseball coach and former pitcher, who is the current head baseball coach of the Texas Longhorns. He played college baseball at Elon from 1986 to 1989 for head coach Rick Jones. He then served as the head coach of the UNLV Rebels (2002–2003), the TCU Horned Frogs (2004–2021), and the Texas A&M Aggies (2022–2024).

Schlossnagle was named National Coach of the Year by the National Collegiate Baseball Writers Association in 2010 and by Baseball America in 2016, and has won eight conference Coach of the Year awards in his 16-year head coaching career.

== Early life and career ==
Schlossnagle grew up in Smithsburg, Maryland, and attended Smithsburg schools. Schlossnagle graduated magna cum laude from Elon University, where he pitched for the Fightin' Christians' 1989 NAIA World Series team and also began his coaching career in 1990 as a pitching coach. After three seasons on the staff at Elon, Schlossnagle spent 1993 on the staff at Clemson before accepting the associate head coach position at Tulane in 1994. He spent eight years at Tulane, including a trip to the College World Series in 2001.

== Coaching career ==
=== UNLV ===
In 2002, Schlossnagle was hired as the head coach at UNLV. A year later, he led the Rebels to a 47–17 record, which included winning both the regular season title and conference tournament in the Mountain West Conference, as well as earning the Rebels' first NCAA Tournament bid since 1996.

=== TCU ===
On August 9, 2003, Schlossnagle was named the head coach at TCU, whose baseball program had just completed its first year in the brand-new Lupton Stadium. During his first season in Fort Worth, 2004, he led the Horned Frogs to a then-school record 39 wins and a Conference USA Tournament championship, clinching their first NCAA bid since 1994. In 2005 and 2006, the Horned Frogs won their second and third consecutive conference tournament championships (2006 was in the Mountain West), which went along with two more NCAA Regional appearances.

In his first three years at TCU, Schlossnagle coached four players who appeared on All-America teams: Robbie Findlay (Honorable Mention in 2004), Lance Broadway (1st Team in 2005), Jake Arrieta (2nd Team in 2006) and Chad Huffman (3rd Team in 2006).

Schlossnagle became the winningest coach in TCU baseball history on February 21, 2016, with his 518th win. He was the first coach to lead TCU to the College World Series, having led them to Omaha five times (2010, 2014, 2015, 2016, 2017). During his tenure in Fort Worth, Schlossnagle has won three National Coach of the Year Awards, two in 2010 and one in 2016.

=== Texas A&M ===
On June 9, 2021, Schlossnagle was named the head baseball coach of the Texas A&M Aggies. In his first year he took the Aggies to the College World Series where they lost to the Oklahoma Sooners in the semifinals. In the 2024 season, the Aggies again went to the College World Series where they lost to Tennessee in Schlossnagle's first-ever trip to the finals.

In the postgame press conference following the Aggies' loss in game 3, Schlossnagle angrily berated a reporter for inquiring about a rumor that he had accepted the head coach position at rival Texas. Despite this outburst during the press conference, Schlossnagle departed for rival Texas the following day on June 25, 2024, taking some of his coaching staff with him and attempting to persuade a few players to transfer to the Longhorns. Following his decision, the sports media blasted Schlossnagle. ESPN personalities Chris "Mad Dog" Russo and Stephen A. Smith were particularly critical of Schlossnagle's credibility after chastising a media member for asking about his future with Russo calling Schlossnagle a "FRAUD!"

=== Texas ===
On June 25, 2024, Schlossnagle was named the head baseball coach of the Texas Longhorns the day following the Aggies' loss in the College World Series finals. This also came less than 24 hours after calling a reporter “selfish” for asking about the Texas job during a press conference, saying “I think it’s pretty selfish of you to ask me that question, to be honest with you,” Schlossnagle responded. “I left my family to be the coach at Texas A&M. I took the job at Texas A&M to never take another job again. That hasn’t changed in my mind. That’s unfair to talk about something like that. That'd be like you asking Montgomery (injured star junior) if he's gonna sign in the draft. I understand you've got to ask the question, but I gave up a big part of my life to come take this job and I poured every ounce of my soul in this job and I gave this job every ounce I could possibly give it. So write that.” The move was widely criticized by numerous media outlets including ESPN, Houston Chronicle, FoxSports, CBS Sports, and others. Several news outlets also reported that many in the Texas Baseball program knew about the deal prior to the 2024 College World Series as talks between Schlossnagle and Texas athletic director Chris Del Conte reportedly began in late April, over a month before the Longhorns even fired their own coach David Pierce, though Schlossnagle denied there were any prior communications.

== Head coaching record ==
Below is a table of Schlossnagle's yearly records as a collegiate head baseball coach.

Record table
Season	Team	Overall	Conference	Standing	Postseason
UNLV Rebels (Mountain West Conference) (2002–2003)
2002	UNLV	30–30	13–17	5th	
2003	UNLV	47–17	24–6	1st	NCAA Regionals
UNLV:		77–47 (.621)	37–23 (.617)		
TCU Horned Frogs (Conference USA) (2004–2005)
2004	TCU	39–26	19–11	T–4th	NCAA Regionals
2005	TCU	41–20	20–10	T–2nd	NCAA Regionals
TCU:			39–21 (.650)		
TCU Horned Frogs (Mountain West Conference) (2006–2012)
2006	TCU	39–23	17–5	1st	NCAA Regionals
2007	TCU	48–14	20–3	1st	NCAA Regionals
2008	TCU	44–19	19–5	1st	NCAA Regionals
2009	TCU	40–18	15–5	1st	NCAA Super Regionals
2010	TCU	54–14	19–5	1st	College World Series
2011	TCU	43–19	20–3	1st	NCAA Regionals
2012	TCU	40–22	18–6	T–1st	NCAA Super Regionals
TCU:			128–32 (.800)		
TCU Horned Frogs (Big 12 Conference) (2013–2021)
2013	TCU	29–28	12–12	T–6th	
2014	TCU	48–18	17–7	2nd	College World Series
2015	TCU	51–15	18–5	1st	College World Series
2016	TCU	49–18	15–9	3rd	College World Series
2017	TCU	50–18	16–8	T–1st	College World Series
2018	TCU	33–23	10–13	6th	
2019	TCU	34–28	11–13	T–6th	NCAA Regionals
2020	TCU	11–4	0–0		Season canceled due to COVID-19
2021	TCU	41–16	17–7	T–1st	NCAA Regionals
TCU:		734–343 (.682)	116–74 (.611)		
Texas A&M Aggies (Southeastern Conference) (2022–2024)
2022	Texas A&M	44–20	19–11	1st (West)	College World Series
2023	Texas A&M	38–27	14–16	5th (West)	NCAA Regionals
2024	Texas A&M	53–15	19–11	2nd (West)	College World Series runner-up
Texas A&M:		135–62 (.685)	52–38 (.578)		
Texas Longhorns (Southeastern Conference) (2025–present)
2025	Texas	44–14	22–8	1st	NCAA Regionals
2026	Texas	46–15	19–10	2nd	College World Series
Texas:		90–29 (.756)	41–18 (.695)		
Total:		1,033–479 (.683)			
National champion Postseason invitational champion Conference regular season champion Conference regular season and conference tournament champion Division regular season champion Division regular season and conference tournament champion Conference tournament champion

== See also ==
- List of current NCAA Division I baseball coaches
