= Kid Nance =

American baseball player (1876–1958)

- Outfielder
- Born: August 2, 1876; Fort Worth, Texas, U.S.
- Died: May 28, 1958 (aged 81); Fort Worth, Texas, U.S.
- Batted: Right Threw: Right

MLB debut
- August 19, 1897, for the Louisville Colonels

Last MLB appearance
- September 28, 1901, for the Detroit Tigers

MLB statistics
- Batting average: .277
- Home runs: 7
- Runs Batted in: 99
- Stats at Baseball Reference

Teams
- Louisville Colonels (1897–1898); Detroit Tigers (1901)

William Gideon Nance (August 2, 1876 – May 28, 1958) was an American outfielder in Major League Baseball who played with the Louisville Colonels of the National League from 1897 to 1898, and then for the Detroit Tigers of the American League in 1901. He was nicknamed "Kid" or "Doc".

== Early years ==
Born as William G. Cooper in Fort Worth, Texas, Nance began his professional baseball career at the age of 18 when he played for two different clubs in the Class-B minor league baseball Texas-Southern League during the 1895 season. Nance opened 1895 with the Fort Worth Panthers but he left the team shortly thereafter to join the Sherman Orphans, which began playing this season. In 1896, the Texas-Southern League became the Class-C Texas Association and Nance rejoined the Panthers. Nevertheless, by August the team folded and he ended the season with the Galveston Sandcrabs.

== Major league career ==
Though the Panthers had restarted their operations in 1897, Nance stayed with the Sandcrabs, only to be signed by the Louisville Colonels of the National League later that year, making his major league debut with them on August 19. As a result, he has the distinction of being the first person from Fort Worth to play in the major leagues. He appeared in 35 games for the Colonels, mainly as a right fielder, although he occasionally played at center field. Overall, he posted a .242 batting average in 120 at bats, including three home runs and 25 runs scored. Nance began 1898 with the Colonels, but after 22 games played and a .316 batting average he was released from the club. He then completed the season with the Paterson Silk Weavers of the Atlantic League, joining them on May 31.

In 1899 and 1900, Nance moved north to play with the Minneapolis Millers of the Western League, a league that was renamed the American League in 1900. He played as a third baseman for the Millers, and had a .268 batting average in 129 games for the 1900 team. He began the 1901 season with the Grand Rapids Furniture Makers of the Western Association, but was quickly signed by the Detroit Tigers of the American League. Nance appeared in 132 games for the Tigers that season, nearly all as their starting left fielder. In 466 at bats, he collected 129 hits for a .280 batting average, hit three home runs while leading the AL in sacrifice hits with 24. Nance achieved a career feat on July 13, 1901, when he collected a six-hit game at Bennett Park, helping the Tigers defeat the Cleveland Blues by a 19–12 score.

== Return to the minor leagues ==
From 1902 until mid-season 1905, Nance played for Class-A Kansas City Blues, one of the eight founding members of the American Association. For the remainder of 1905 and the entire 1906 season, he joined the Toledo Mud Hens, also of the American Association. In 1907, he split his playing time between the Trenton Tigers of the Tri-State League before joining the Sioux City Packers of the new Western League. He returned to the Texas League in 1908, playing a full season with the Waco Navigators, then in 1909, he rejoined the Fort Worth Panthers, while also playing a stint with the Shreveport Pirates.

In 1910, Nance played for a full season with the Jackson Tigers the Cotton States League, only to return to the Panthers in 1911. He began the 1912 season with the Panthers, but later played with two other Texas League teams, the Beaumont Oilers and the San Antonio Bronchos.

In 1913, Nance rejoined the Panthers, this time as their player-manager and remained in that capacity for the entire season. He began the 1914 season, again as their player-manager, although with the team in fifth place on July 7, he was replaced by Jake Atz, the team's second baseman. The move did not improve the team's place in the standings, finishing the season in fifth place, and Nance had moved on to play with the Austin Senators and Waco Navigators of the Texas League, and the Oklahoma City Boosters of the Western Association. Nance returned to the Panthers in 1915 as their player-manager, with a similar result, departing on June 15 when the team while in fifth place, again with Atz as his replacement.

Afterwards, Nance managed the Terrell Terrors of the class-D Central Texas League in 1916. He later became head coach of the Texas Christian University baseball team.

Nance was playing for the Tampa Smokers of the Florida State League in 1921, as he was invited to play with the Washington Senators of the American League. By then, the Senators arrived to Tampa for spring training, though he did not make the club. It was noted that he was a local fan favorite due to his hard work and aggressiveness. In 1923, he became the Smokers' manager. During spring training of 1924, the Senators returned to Tampa and Nance was enlisted to assist with the training of their catchers. It was reported that Nance was going to be offered a contract as well, but there is no record of serving the team in any capacity. In 1925, Nance worked as general manager of the Smokers and, when he was introduced to future Hall of Fame catcher, Al López, he gave him a tryout. After watching the 17-year-old catcher play, Nance signed López a contract worth $150 a month in salary. On the inside, López was excited with the deal, according to a newspaper article.

== Head coaching record ==
Record table
Season	Team	Overall	Conference	Standing	Postseason
TCU Horned Frogs (Independent) (1913–1914)
1913	TCU	17–5–1			
1914	TCU	17–5–1			
TCU Horned Frogs (Independent) (1921–1922)
1921	TCU	20–2			
1922	TCU	13–0			
TCU Horned Frogs (Southwest Conference) (1923–1925)
1923	TCU	13–11	2–10	7th	
1924	TCU	11–7	11–7	2nd	
1925	TCU	9–3–2	9–3	2nd	
TCU:		100–33–4 (.745)	22–20 (.524)		
Total:		100–33–4 (.745)			
National champion Postseason invitational champion Conference regular season champion Conference regular season and conference tournament champion Division regular season champion Division regular season and conference tournament champion Conference tournament champion

== Later years ==
Nance died on May 28, 1958, at the age of 81 in a rest home in Fort Worth. He was interred at Shannon Rose Hill Memorial Park.

== See also ==
- List of Major League Baseball single-game hits leaders
