= Lance Broadway =

American baseball player (1983–2026)

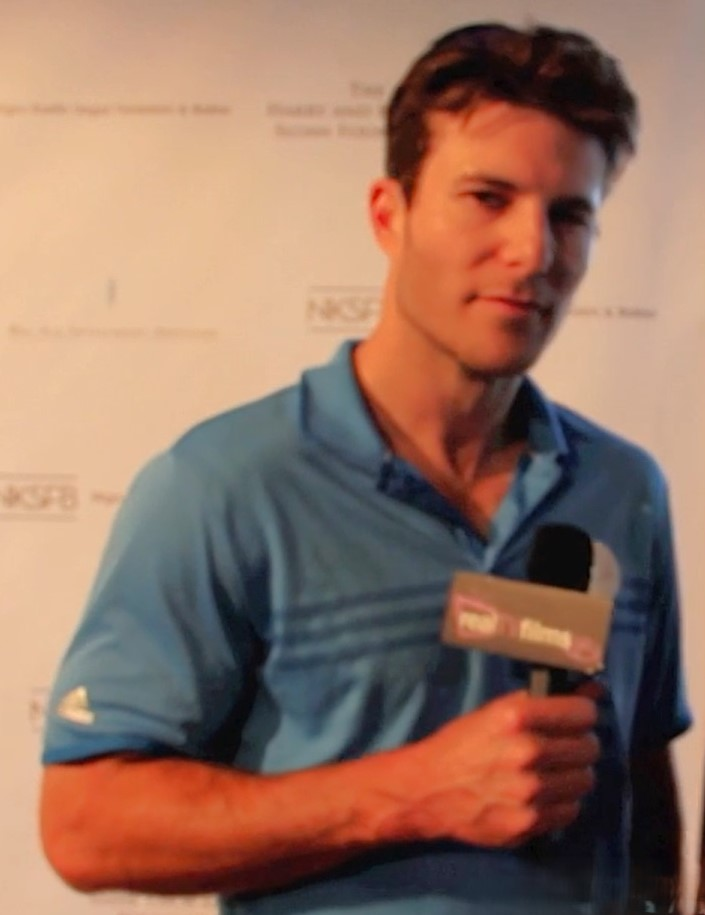
- Broadway in 2016
- Pitcher
- Born: August 20, 1983; Bryan, Texas, U.S.
- Died: November 17, 2026 (aged 43); Dallas, Texas, U.S.
- Batted: Right Threw: Right

MLB debut
- September 7, 2007, for the Chicago White Sox

Last MLB appearance
- September 26, 2009, for the New York Mets

MLB statistics
- Win–loss record: 2–2
- Earned run average: 5.24
- Strikeouts: 39
- Stats at Baseball Reference

Teams
- Chicago White Sox (2007–2009); New York Mets (2009)

Lance Daniel Broadway (August 20, 1983 – November 17, 2026) was an American actor and professional baseball pitcher. He played in Major League Baseball (MLB) for the Chicago White Sox and New York Mets from 2007 to 2009. After his baseball career, he became an actor.

== Baseball career ==
=== Amateur career ===
Broadway was born in Bryan, Texas, and attended Grand Prairie High School, where he was an all-district performer all three of his years on the varsity team. He transferred from Grand Prairie after his junior year and attended Waxahachie High. He played with former high-school All-State player Ben Hudspeth. Broadway then attended Dallas Baptist University and played college baseball for the Dallas Baptist Patriots. He earned all-conference honors both years he pitched for the Patriots. He threw two no-hitters as a freshman and as a sophomore went 10–2 with a 2.82 Earned run average and 102 strikeouts in 108 innings pitched.

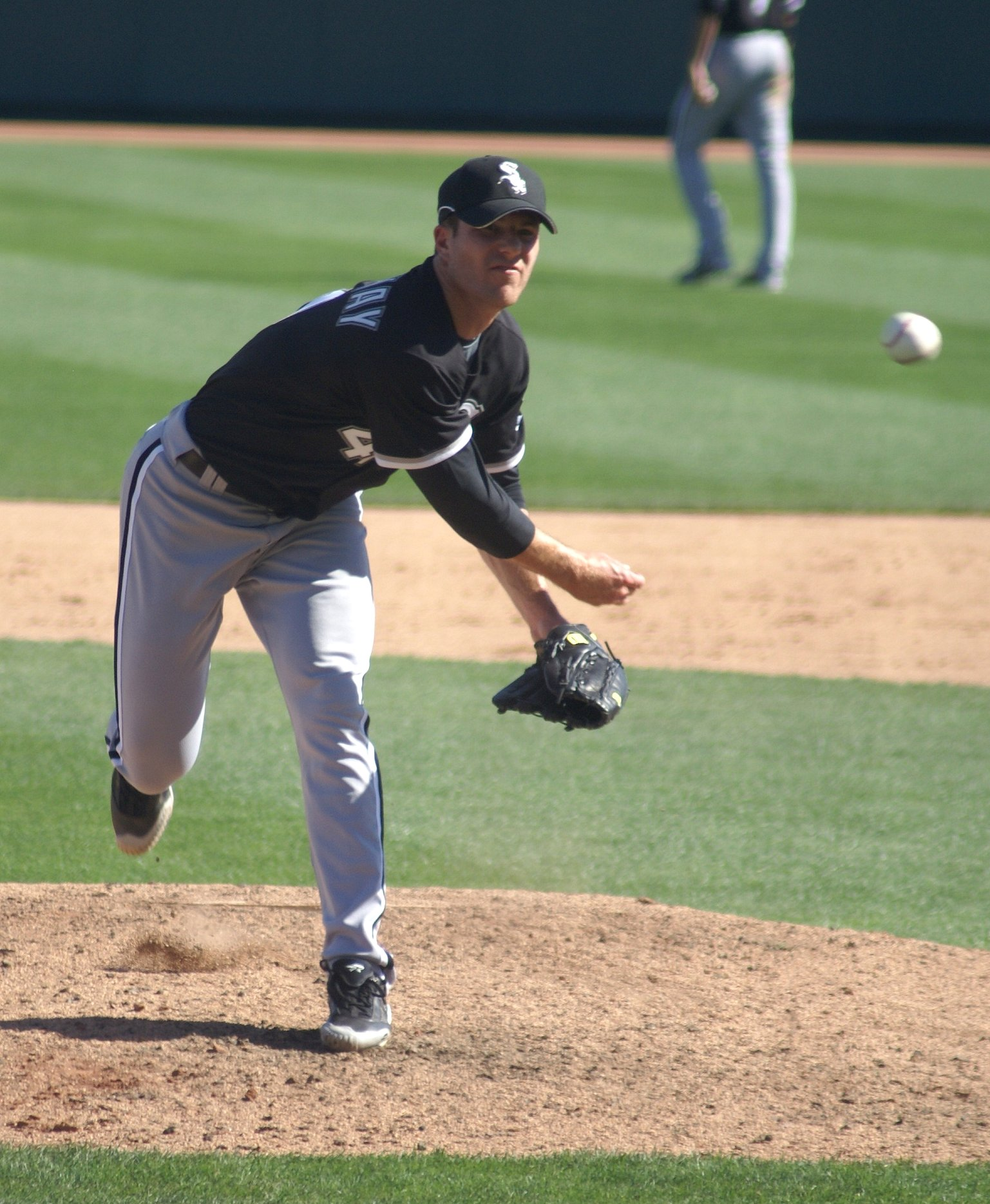
Broadway with the Chicago White Sox in 2009

After two seasons with Dallas Baptist, Broadway transferred to Texas Christian University. He went 15–1 with a 1.62 ERA and 151 strikeouts in 117 innings pitched for the Horned Frogs. He was named to the All-Tournament Team of the 2005 Conference USA Tournament and also the conference's Pitcher of the Year and Male Athlete of the Year.

=== Professional career ===
The Chicago White Sox selected Broadway in the first round, with the 15th overall selection, of the 2005 Major League Baseball draft. He signed for $1.57 million. After being selected, Broadway went 1–3 with a 4.58 ERA in 11 starts for the Single-A Winston-Salem Warthogs of the Carolina League. He went into the 2006 season considered the eighth best prospect in the White Sox system, and combined to go 8–8 with a 2.75 ERA and 117 strikeouts in 26 starts and 160.1 innings pitched between the Double-A Birmingham Barons and Triple-A Charlotte Knights.

Entering 2007, Broadway was named the third-best prospect in the White Sox system. Broadway finished the season at 8–9 with a 4.65 ERA and 108 strikeouts in 26 starts and 155 innings pitched for Charlotte.

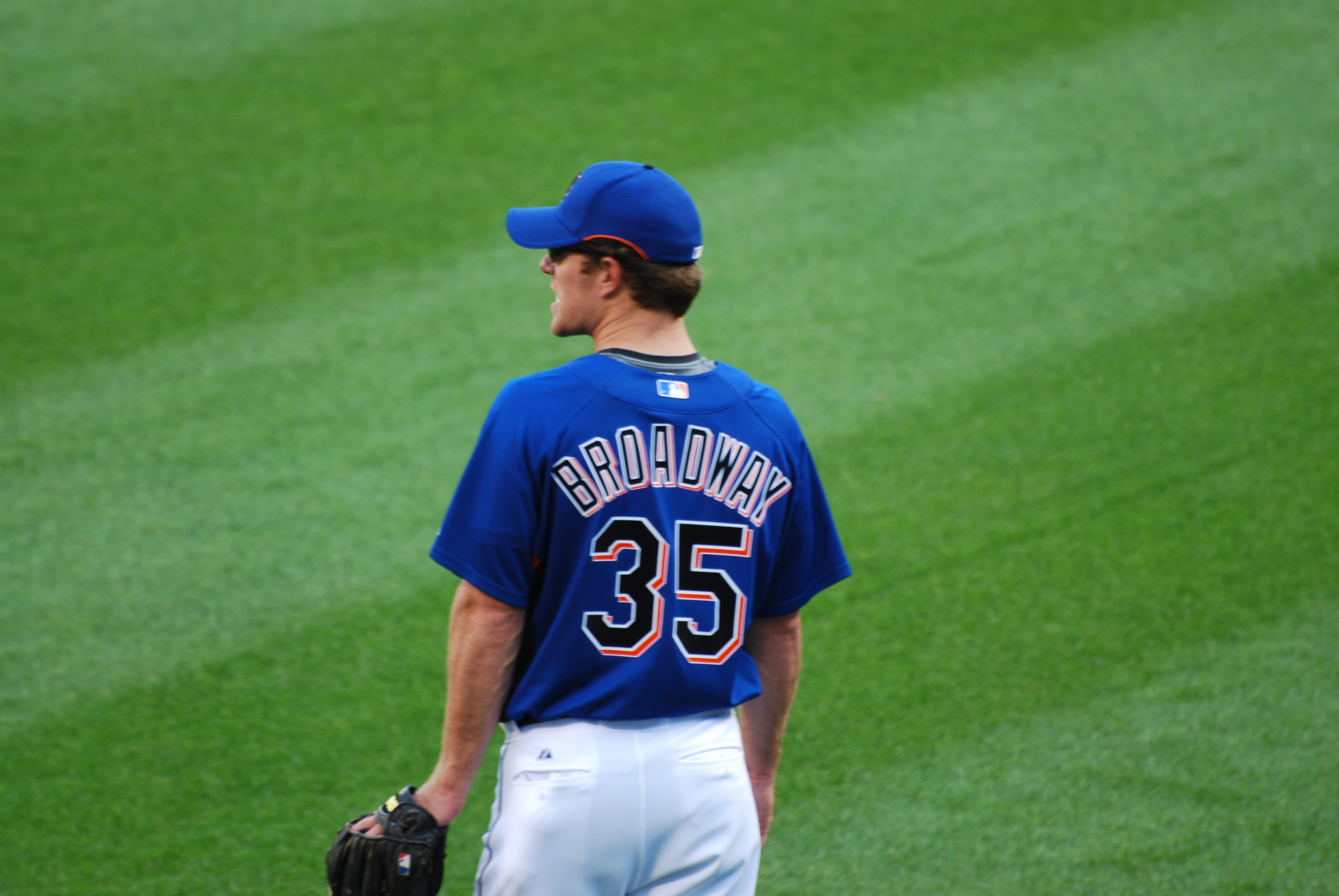
Broadway with the Mets in 2009

The White Sox, with a surplus of starting pitching, and realizing that Broadway was unlikely to crack the team's rotation saw an opportunity to acquire a veteran backup catcher. The Sox traded Broadway to the Mets for Ramón Castro in May 2009. Broadway, who was 0–1 with a 5.06 ERA for the season, was assigned to the Triple-A Buffalo Bisons of the International League and was added to the starting rotation.

On August 26, 2009, Broadway was called up to the New York Mets when LHP Óliver Pérez was placed on the disabled list.

On December 13, 2009, Broadway was non-tendered by the New York Mets, making him a free agent.

On December 16, 2009, Broadway was signed by the Toronto Blue Jays to a minor league deal. He spent the entire season with the Triple-A Las Vegas 51s, going 3–11 with a 7.66 ERA in 29 games (20 starts).

== Acting career ==
Broadway made his motion picture debut in the 2013 film Olympus Has Fallen.

In 2014, Broadway was cast as Commander Linden in the science fiction thriller Teleios, which was later renamed Beyond the Trek, and released in 2017 by Screen Media Films.

In 2015, Broadway was cast as Devon in the short film Shattered Reflections. He appeared in several TV series including: Saint George, Kevin From Work, Lucifer, Agents of S.H.I.E.L.D., and Colony.

== Personal life and death ==
At a nightclub in 2010, Broadway allegedly assaulted a man, severely damaging his eye and face.

Broadway died on November 17, 2026, at the age of 43.

== Filmography ==
Year	Title	Role	Notes
2011	Deadly Notes	Arthur	Short
2011	Food Attack	Richard	TV film
2012	Undeliverable	Jake	Short
2013	Olympus Has Fallen	O'Neil	
2013	True Tales	Johnny Brewer	
2014	Saint George	Sean	1 episode
2015	Kevin from Work	Grinder	1 episode
2015	Shattered Reflections	Devon	Short
2016	Lucifer	Bodyguard	1 episode
2016	Agents of S.H.I.E.L.D.	TAC Team Leader	1 episode
2016	Real Husbands of Hollywood	UPS guy	1 episode (uncredited)
2016	Teleios	Commander Linden	
2016–17	Colony	Redhat in Commercial Red Hat Guard #2	2 episodes
