= 2012 Southeastern Conference baseball tournament =

- 2012 SEC baseball tournament logo
- Teams: 10
- Format: 2-Bracket Double Elimination
- Finals site: Regions Park; Hoover, Alabama
- Champions: Mississippi State (7th title)
- Winning coach: John Cohen (1st title)
- MVP: Adam Frazier (Mississippi State)
- Attendance: 129,112

The 2012 Southeastern Conference baseball tournament was held at Regions Park in Hoover, Alabama from May 22 through 27, 2012.

== Seeding ==
The top ten teams (based on conference results) from the conference earned invites to the tournament.

| Team | W | L | Pct | GB | Seed |
|---|---|---|---|---|---|
Eastern Division
| South Carolina | 18 | 11 | .621 | – | 2 |
| Florida | 18 | 12 | .600 | .5 | 3 |
| Kentucky | 18 | 12 | .600 | .5 | 4 |
| Vanderbilt | 16 | 14 | .533 | 2.5 | 5 |
| Georgia | 14 | 15 | .483 | 4 | 8 |
| Tennessee | 8 | 22 | .267 | 10.5 | – |

| Team | W | L | Pct | GB | Seed |
|---|---|---|---|---|---|
Western Division
| LSU | 19 | 11 | .633 | – | 1 |
| Arkansas | 16 | 14 | .533 | 3 | 6 |
| Mississippi State | 16 | 14 | .533 | 3 | 7 |
| Ole Miss | 14 | 16 | .467 | 5 | 9 |
| Auburn | 13 | 17 | .433 | 6 | 10 |
| Alabama | 9 | 21 | .300 | 10 | – |

== Format ==
The 2012 tournament increased the number of teams from eight to ten. The event ran from Tuesday through Sunday. Regular season division champions received byes on Tuesday. Games played from Tuesday to Friday were double elimination. Saturday's games featured semifinal match-ups with no "if necessary" games, like in years past. Winners of the two semi-final games faced each other during Sunday's championship game.

== Tournament ==
First round
4 | Kentucky | 2
9 | Ole Miss | 0
6 | Arkansas | 1
7 | Mississippi State | 9
9 | Ole Miss | 2
6 | Arkansas | 0
3 | Florida | 6
10 | Auburn | 1
5 | Vanderbilt | 4
8 | Georgia | 1
10 | Auburn | 3
8 | Georgia | 2

Second round
1 | LSU | 2
7 | Mississippi State | 3
9 | Ole Miss | 2
1 | LSU | 11
2 | South Carolina | 2
5 | Vanderbilt | 3
10 | Auburn | 3
2 | South Carolina | 5

Third round
7 | Mississippi State | 1
4 | Kentucky | 5
1 | LSU | 3*
7 | Mississippi State | 4*
5 | Vanderbilt | 2
3 | Florida | 1
2 | South Carolina | 2
3 | Florida | 7

Semifinals
4 | Kentucky | 1
7 | Mississippi State | 2
5 | Vanderbilt | 8
3 | Florida | 6

Finals
7 | Mississippi State | 3
5 | Vanderbilt | 0

- * Game went to extra innings
- ^ Game ended after 7 innings because of mercy rule

== All-Tournament Team ==
| Position | Player | School |
|---|---|---|
| 1B | Matt Snyder | Ole Miss |
| 2B | Casey Turgeon | Florida |
| 3B | Thomas McCarthy | Kentucky |
| SS | Adam Frazier | Mississippi State |
| C | Spencer Navin | Vanderbilt |
| OF | Connor Harrell | Vanderbilt |
| OF | Mike Yastrzemski | Vanderbilt |
| OF | Mason Katz | LSU |
| OF | Justin Shafer | Florida |
| OF | Demarcus Henderson | Mississippi State |
| DH | Brian Johnson | Florida |
| P | Brian Johnson | Florida |
| P | Jonathan Holder | Mississippi State |
| MVP | Adam Frazier | Mississippi State |

== See also ==
- 2012 College World Series
- 2012 NCAA Division I baseball tournament
- Southeastern Conference baseball tournament
