= 2012 College Baseball All-America Team =

This is a list of college baseball players named first team All-Americans for the 2012 NCAA Division I baseball season. From 2011 to 2014, there were five generally recognized All-America selectors for baseball: the American Baseball Coaches Association, Baseball America, Collegiate Baseball Newspaper, the National Collegiate Baseball Writers Association, and Perfect Game. In order to be considered a "consensus" All-American, a player must have been selected by at least three of these.

== Key ==
A	American Baseball Coaches Association
B	Baseball America
C	Collegiate Baseball Newspaper
N	National Collegiate Baseball Writers Association
P	Perfect Game
	Member of the National College Baseball Hall of Fame
	Consensus All-American – selected by all five organizations
	Consensus All-American – selected by three or four organizations

== All-Americans ==
Position	Name	School	#	A	B	C	N	P	Other awards and honors
Starting pitcher	Mark Appel	Stanford	2	—	—	✓	✓	—	National Pitcher of the Year
Starting pitcher	Kevin Gausman	LSU	3	✓	—	✓	—	✓	
Starting pitcher	Andrew Heaney	Oklahoma State	5	✓	✓	✓	✓	✓	
Starting pitcher	Nick Petree	Missouri State	3	—	✓	✓	✓	—	Collegiate Baseball Player of the Year
Starting pitcher	Carlos Rodon	NC State	5	✓	✓	✓	✓	✓	
Starting pitcher	Chris Stratton	Mississippi State	5	✓	✓	✓	✓	✓	
Relief pitcher	Robert Benincasa	Florida State	3	—	✓	—	✓	✓	
Relief pitcher	Stefan Lopez	Southeastern Louisiana	1	—	—	—	✓	—	Stopper of the Year
Relief pitcher	Mike Morin	North Carolina	3	—	—	✓	✓	✓	
Relief pitcher	Jimmie Sherfy	Oregon	1	✓	—	—	—	—	
Catcher	Mike Zunino	Florida	5	✓	✓	✓	✓	✓	Dick Howser Trophy Golden Spikes Award Baseball America Player of the Year Johnny Bench Award
First baseman	Jayce Boyd	Florida State	2	✓	—	—	—	✓	
First baseman	Goose Kallunki	Utah Valley	3	✓	—	✓	✓	—	
First baseman	Chris Serritella	Southern Illinois	1	—	✓	—	—	—	
Second baseman	Alex Yarbrough	Ole Miss	5	✓	✓	✓	✓	✓	
Shortstop	Alex Mejia	Arizona	3	✓	—	✓	—	✓	
Shortstop	Jimmy Rider	Kent State	1	—	✓	—	—	—	
Shortstop	Richie Rodriguez	Eastern Kentucky	1	—	—	—	✓	—	
Third baseman	Kris Bryant	San Diego	1	—	✓	—	—	—	
Third baseman	D. J. Peterson	New Mexico	4	✓	—	✓	✓	✓	
Outfielder	Jeff Gelalich	UCLA	1	—	✓	—	—	—	
Outfielder	Mitch Haniger	Cal Poly	1	✓	—	—	—	—	
Outfielder	Travis Jankowski	Stony Brook	4	✓	✓	—	✓	✓	ABCA Player of the Year
Outfielder	Danny Poma	Hofstra	2	—	—	✓	✓	—	
Outfielder	James Ramsey	Florida State	5	✓	✓	✓	✓	✓	ABCA Player of the Year Senior CLASS Award
Outfielder	Raph Rhymes	LSU	4	✓	—	✓	✓	✓	
Designated hitter	Nick Backlund	Mercer	1	—	—	✓	—	—	
Designated hitter	Daniel Kassouf	Appalachian State	2	✓	—	—	✓	—	
Designated hitter	Josh Ludy	Baylor	1	—	✓	—	—	—	
Designated hitter	Richie Shaffer	Clemson	1	—	—	—	—	✓	
Utility player	Marco Gonzales	Gonzaga	2	✓	✓	—	—	—	
Utility player	Brian Johnson	Florida	2	—	—	—	✓	✓	John Olerud Award
Utility player	Michael Lorenzen	Cal State Fullerton	1	—	—	✓	—	—	

== See also ==
- List of college baseball awards
