= 2012 Arkansas Razorbacks baseball team =

College baseball season

2012 Arkansas Razorbacks baseball

Houston Regional Champions Waco Super Regional Champions

College World Series, T–3rd
- Conference: Southeastern Conference
- West

Ranking
- Coaches: No. 3
- CB: No. 3
- Record: 46-22 (16-14 SEC)
- Head coach: Dave Van Horn
- Hitting coach: Todd Butler
- Pitching coach: Dave Jorn
- Home stadium: Baum Stadium

2012 Southeastern Conference baseball standings
	Conf.				Overall
Team	W		L	PCT	W		L	PCT
Eastern
No. 2 South Carolina ^{x}‍‍‍^{y}	18	–	11	.621	49	–	20	.710
No. 6 Florida ‍‍‍^{y}	18	–	12	.600	47	–	20	.701
No. 19 Kentucky ‍‍‍^{y}	18	–	12	.600	45	–	18	.714
No. 25 Vanderbilt ‍‍‍^{y}	16	–	14	.533	35	–	28	.556
Georgia ‍‍‍	14	–	15	.483	31	–	26	.544
Tennessee ‍‍‍	8	–	22	.267	24	–	31	.436
Western
No. 11 LSU ^{x}‍†‍‍^{y}	19	–	11	.633	47	–	18	.723
No. 3 Arkansas ‍‍‍^{y}	16	–	14	.533	46	–	22	.676
Mississippi State ‍‍‡‍^{y}	16	–	14	.533	40	–	24	.625
Ole Miss ‍‍‍^{y}	14	–	16	.467	37	–	26	.587
Auburn ‍‍‍	13	–	17	.433	31	–	28	.525
Alabama ‍‍‍	9	–	21	.300	21	–	34	.382
x – Division champion † – Conference champion ‡ – Tournament champion y – Invited to the NCAA tournament As of June 26, 2012; Rankings from Coaches' Poll

The 2012 Arkansas Razorbacks baseball team represented the University of Arkansas in baseball at the Division I level in the NCAA for the 2012 season. Dave van Horn was the coach in his tenth year at his alma mater. The team clinched a berth in the 2012 College World Series after winning the Waco Super Regional on June 11.

== Coaches ==
2012 Arkansas Razorbacks baseball coaching staff
- 2 Dave van Horn - Head coach
- 22 Todd Butler - Hitting coach
- 31 Dave Jorn - Pitching coach
- 21 Brian Walker - Volunteer assistant coach
- 11 Matt Willard - Student assistant coach

Source: arkansasrazorbacks.com

== Roster ==
2012 Arkansas Razorbacks fall baseball roster
Source: arkansasrazorbacks.com – The Official Site of University of Arkansas Athletics
Number	Name	Position	B/T	Height	Weight	Class	Hometown/HS/JC
1	Brian Anderson	INF	R/R	6–3	185	Fr.	Edmond, OK/Deer Creek HS
3	Jacob Mahan	INF	L/R	6–0	185	Jr.	Camarillo, CA/Oxnard College/Camarillo HS
4	Jacob Morris	OF/RHP	R/R	6–3	215	(redshirt) Jr.	Coppell, TX/ Coppell HS
5	Matt Reynolds	INF	R/R	6–1	200	Jr.	Tulsa, OK/Bishop Kelley HS
6	Jimmy Bosco	OF	L/R	5–9	170	(redshirt) So.	Granite Bay, CA/University of California/Jesuit HS
7	David Masters	INF	R/R	6–1	185	Fr.	Lake St. Louis, MO/Timberland HS
8	Tyler Spoon	INF/OF	R/R	5-11	190	Fr.	Van Buren, AR/Van Buren HS
9	Derrick Bleeker	RHP/INF	R/R	6–5	225	Jr.	Longmont, CO/Howard JC/Skyline HS
10	Joe Serrano	INF	R/R	6–0	195	Fr.	Tucson, AZ/Salpointe Catholic HS
12	Bo Bigham	INF	R/R	5–10	185	Sr.	Texarkana, AR/Arkansas HS
13	Michael Gunn	OF/RHP	L/L	6–0	205	Fr.	Wilson, AR/Christian Brothers HS
14	John Clay Reeves	C	R/R	6–0	200	Fr.	Monroe, LA/Neville HS
15	Nolan Sanburn	RHP	R/R	6–1	205	So.	Kokomo, IN/Kokomo HS
16	Sam Bates	OF	L/R	6-5	230	Sr.	Cabot, AR/Crowder JC/Cabot HS
17	Barrett Astin	RHP	R/R	6–1	200	So.	Forrest City, Ark. (Forrest City HS)
18	Tim Carver	INF	R/R	6–0	185	(redshirt) Sr.	Fayetteville, AR/Fayetteville HS
19	Jake Wise	C	R/R	6-0	200	So.	Houston, TX/Cypress Falls HS
20	Matt Vinson	OF	S/R	6-2	210	Jr.	Alma, AR/Alma HS
24	D. J. Baxendale	RHP	R/R	6–2	190	Jr.	Jacksonville, AR/Sylvan Hills HS
25	Dominic Ficociello	INF	S/R	6-4	185	So.	Fullerton, CA/Fullerton Union HS
26	Parker Gibson	INF/OF	R/R	5–9	165	Fr.	Lansing, KS/Lansing HS
27	Jean Ramirez	C	R/R	6–0	200	Fr.	Ft. Worth, TX/Boswell HS
28	Connor Costello	OF/RHP	R/R	6–3	188	Fr.	Edmond, OK/Santa Fe HS
29	Eric Fisher	OF/1B	L/L	6–3	200	So.	Spring, TX/Klein HS
30	Brandon Moore	RHP	R/R	6–3	228	So.	Van Buren, AR/Van Buren HS
32	Randall Fant	LHP	L/L	6–4	185	Jr.	Texarkana, Texas/Texas HS
33	Greg Milhorn	RHP	R/R	6–2	175	Fr.	Texarkana, AR/Arkansas HS
34	Colby Suggs	RHP	R/R	6–0	225	So.	Sulphur Springs, TXSulphur Springs HS
35	Mark Reyes	LHP	R/L	6–1	200	Fr.	Hot Springs Village, AR/Jessieville HS
36	Jeff Harvill	LHP	L/L	6–0	180	So.	Keithville, LA/Evangel Christian Academy
37	Trent Daniel	LHP	R/L	6–2	195	(redshirt) Jr.	Bryant, AR/Arkansas-Fort Smith/Bryant HS
38	Brian Heldman	RHP	R/R	6–3	170	Fr.	Round Rock, TX/Stony Point HS
39	Chris Oliver	RHP	R/R	6–4	180	Fr.	Farmington, AR/Shiloh Christian HS
44	Kameron Walker	OF	L/L	6–1	210	Jr.	Jonesboro, AR/Panola JC/Jonesboro HS)
45	Landon Simpson	RHP	R/R	5–10	180	Fr.	Magnolia, AR/Magnolia HS
47	Ty Wright	LHP	L/L	6–2	175	Jr.	Houston, TX/San Jacinto CC/Mayde Creek HS
49	John Woodcock	LHP	L/L	5-11	180	So.	Ojai, CA/Villanova Prep HS
51	Cade Lynch	LHP	L/L	6–6	230	Jr.	Jonesboro, AR/Panola JC/Valley View HS
52	Wilson Pfeiffer	C	R/R	6–2	195	Fr.	Columbia, MO/Rock Bridge HS
55	Ryne Stanek	RHP	R/R	6–4	180	So.	Overland Park, KS/Blue Valley HS
56	Braden Hughes	C	R/R	5–10	190	Fr.	Mountain Home, AR/Mountain Home HS

== Schedule ==
2012 Game Log
Regular season

#	Date	Opponent	Location	Score	Win	Loss	Save	Attendance	Record	SEC
1	2/17/12	Villanova	Baum Stadium	11–5	Baxendale (1–0)	Helisek (0–1)	–	7,312	1–0	
2	2/18/12	Villanova	Baum Stadium	13–1	Stanek (1–0)	Young (0–1)	–	7,072	2–0	
3	2/19/12	Villanova	Baum Stadium	17–1	Astin (1–0)	Almonte (0–1)	–	7,456	3–0	
4	2/21/12	Northwestern State	Baum Stadium	8 –7	Sanburn (1–0)	Roman (0–1)	–	6,132	4–0	
5	2/22/12	Northwestern State	Baum Stadium	6–2	Reyes (1–0)	Adams (0–1)	–	6,382	5–0	
6	2/24/12	Valparaiso	Baum Stadium	7–3	Baxendale (2–0)	Deetjen (0–1)	Lynch (1)	6,194	6–0	
7	2/25/12	Valparaiso	Baum Stadium	4–3	Stanek (2–0)	Wormington (0–1)	Astin (1)	7,380	7–0	
8	2/26/12	Valparaiso	Baum Stadium	9-10 (10)	Miller (1–0)	Sanburn (1–1)	–	6,885	7–1	
9	2/28/12	BYU	Baum Stadium	5–0	Moore (1–0)	Westensee (0–1)	–	6,255	8–1	
10	2/29/12	BYU	Baum Stadium	8–1	Baxendale (3–0)	Poulson (0–1)	–	6,846	9–1	
11	3/2/12	Texas Tech	Minute Maid Park	3–1	Stanek (3–0)	von Schamann (2–1)	Astin (2)	8,540	10–1	
12	3/3/12	Houston	Minute Maid Park	1–4	Lewis (2–1)	Fant (0–1)	Morehouse (1)	–	10–2	
13	3/4/12	#21 Texas	Minute Maid Park	7–3	Baxendale (4–0)	Jacquez (0–1)	Astin (3)	–	11–2	
14	3/9/12	Binghamton	Baum Stadium	4–0	Stanek (4–0)	Augliera (0–2)	–	6,914	12–2	
15	3/10/12	Binghamton	Baum Stadium	5–3	Baxendale (5–0)	Lynch (0–2)	Moore (1)	–	13–2	
16	3/10/12	Binghamton	Baum Stadium	6–0	Fant (1–1)	Lambert (0–2)	–	8,963	14–2	
17	3/13/12	Gonzaga	Baum Stadium	1–0	Suggs (1–0)	Moon (1–1)	Astin (4)	7,420	15–2	
18	3/14/12	Gonzaga	Baum Stadium	5-3	Moore (2–0)	Abbruzza (0–2)	Astin (5)	6,578	16–2	
19	3/16/12	Alabama	Baum Stadium	4–3 (12)	Astin (2–0)	Rosencrans (0–1)	–	8,530	17–2	1–0
20	3/17/12	Alabama	Baum Stadium	8–4	Stanek (5–0)	Guilbeau (1–2)	Moore (2)	9,615	18-2	2–0
21	3/18/12	Alabama	Baum Stadium	7–4	Sanburn (2–1)	Pilkington (0–2)	Astin (6)	8,426	19–2	3–0
22	3/20/12	Nevada	Baum Stadium	Postponed (rain)						
23	3/21/12	Nevada	Baum Stadium	10–2	Oliver (1–0)	Marks (0–2)	–	6,502	20–2	3–0
24	3/23/12	at Mississippi State	Dudy Noble Field	2-11	Stratton (5–0)	Baxendale (5–1)	-	6,289	20-3	3–1
25	3/24/12	at Mississippi State	Dudy Noble Field	8-0	Stanek (6–0)	Routt (1–3)	-	6,763	21-3	4–1
26	3/25/12	at Mississippi State	Dudy Noble Field	8-5 (11)	Suggs (2–0)	Reed (0–4)	Lynch (2)	6,228	22-3	5–1
27	3/30/12	at #15 LSU	Alex Box Stadium	10-6	Gausman (5–0)	Lynch (0–1)	-	11,095	22-4	5–2
28	3/31/12	at #15 LSU	Alex Box Stadium	1-2	Cotton (3–0)	Astin (2–1)	-	11,710	22-5	5–3
29	4/1/12	at #15 LSU	Alex Box Stadium	2-3 (11)	Bourgeois (1-1)	Astin (2-2)	-	10,686	22-6	5–4
30	4/6/12	Georgia	Baum Stadium	4-2	Wood (4–1)	Stanek (6–1)	-	9,033	22-7	5-5
31	4/7/12	Georgia	Baum Stadium	8-3	Moore (3–0)	Palazzone (0–4)	-	8,479	23-7	6–5
32	4/8/12	Georgia	Baum Stadium	8-0	Baxendale (6–1)	Nagel (0–1)	-	6,973	24-7	7–5
33	4/10/12	at Oklahoma	Dale Mitchell Park	0-4	Magnifico (1–0)	Fant (1–2)	Okert (1)	1,537	24-8	7–5
34	4/13/12	#3 Kentucky	Baum Stadium	8-7	Lynch (1-1)	Phillips (5–1)	-	9,287	25-8	8–5
35	4/14/12	#3 Kentucky	Baum Stadium	4-5	Shepherd (3–0)	Astin (2–3)	Peterson (1)	9,575	25-9	8–6
36	4/14/12	#3 Kentucky	Baum Stadium	1-2	Littrell (6–0)	Baxendale (6–2)	Gott (8)	9,575	25-10	8–7
37	4/17/12	Stephen F. Austin	Baum Stadium	8-3	Fant (2-2)	Landers (0–2)	Daniel (1)	7,464	26-10	8–7
38	4/17/12	Stephen F. Austin	Baum Stadium	4-3	Suggs (3–0)	Dozier (0–1)	-	7,464	27-10	8–7
39	4/21/12	at #22 Ole Miss	Swayze Field	2-8	Greenwood (1–0)	Moore (3–1)	-	7,647	27-11	8-8
40	4/21/12	at #22 Ole Miss	Swayze Park	0-1	Mayers (4–2)	Stanek (6–2)	Hively (1)	10,603	27-12	8–9
41	4/22/12	at #22 Ole Miss	Swayze Park	11-3	Lynch (2–1)	Smith (2–3)	-	8,115	28-12	9-9
42	4/24/12	Oral Roberts	Baum Stadium	6-1	Daniel (1–0)	Wilson (1–2)	-	6,837	29-12	9-9
43	4/27/12	at #5 Florida	McKethan Stadium	2-3	Randall (4–1)	Stanek (6–3)	Maddox (12)	3,906	29-13	9–10
44	4/28/12	at #5 Florida	McKethan Stadium	5-1	Moore (4–1)	Johnson (5–3)	-	4,894	30-13	10-10
45	4/29/12	at #5 Florida	McKethan Stadium	3-1 (10)	Suggs (4–0)	Magliozzi (4–2)	Astin (7)	3,927	31-13	11–10
46	5/1/12	Missouri	Baum Stadium	6-3	Sanburn (3–1)	Holovach (5–4)	-	7,051	32-13	11–10
47	5/2/12	Missouri	Baum Stadium	2-0	Gunn (1–0)	Walsh (2–3)	Astin (8)	6,840	33-13	11–10
48	5/4/12	#5 South Carolina	Baum Stadium	6-8 (10)	Beal (3-3)	Astin (2–4)	Price (7)	8,982	33-14	11-11
49	5/5/12	#5 South Carolina	Baum Stadium	7-6	Wright (1–0)	Montgomery (4–1)	Astin (9)	8,774	34-14	12–11
50	5/6/12	#5 South Carolina	Baum Stadium	7-10	Price (4–3)	Baxendale (6–3)	-	8,461	34-15	12-12
51	5/10/12	Auburn	Baum Stadium	2-3 (10)	Varnadore (3–7)	Astin (2–5)	-	7,555	34-16	12–13
52	5/11/12	Auburn	Baum Stadium	5-4	Suggs (5–0)	Smith (3–5)	-	8,536	35-16	13-13
53	5/12/12	Auburn	Baum Stadium	5-12	Smith (4–5)	Moore (4–2)	Bryant (5)	8,512	35-17	13–14
54	5/15/12	Louisiana Tech	Dickey-Stephens Park	6-5 (10)	Astin (3–5)	Dudley (4-4)	-	10,512	36-17	13–14
55	5/17/12	Tennessee	Lindsey Nelson Stadium	8-0	Baxendale (7–3)	Saberhagen (5–3)	-	1,721	37-17	14-14
56	5/18/12	Tennessee	Lindsey Nelson Stadium	10-3	Lynch (3–1)	Williams (3–5)	-	1,808	38-17	15–14
57	5/19/12	Tennessee	Lindsey Nelson Stadium	8-2	Suggs (6–0)	Stevens (1–2)	-	2,121	39-17	16–14

SEC Tournament

#	Date	Opponent	Location	Score	Win	Loss	Save	Att	Record	Tournament Record
58	5/22/12	vs. #24 Mississippi State	Regions Park	1-9	Woodruff (1–2)	Stanek (6–4)	Holder (7)	5,489	39-18	0–1
59	5/23/12	vs. Ole Miss	Regions Park	0-2	Mayers (5–3)	Baxendale (7–4)	Huber (10)	-	39-19	0–2

NCAA tournament: Houston Regional

#	Date	Opponent	Location	Score	Win	Loss	Save	Att	Record	NCAAT Record
60	6/1/12	Sam Houston State	Reckling Park	5-4	Moore (5–2)	Smith (8–6)	-	3,081	40-19	1–0
61	6/2/12	#8 Rice	Reckling Park	1-0	Stanek (7–4)	Kubitza (6–5)	Astin (10)	3,869	41-19	2–0
62	6/3/12	Sam Houston State	Reckling Park	5-1	Sanburn (4–1)	Dickson (4–5)	-	2,987	42-19	3–0

NCAA tournament: Waco Super Regional

#	Date	Opponent	Location	Score	Win	Loss	Save	Att	Record	Super Record
63	6/9/12	#4 Baylor	Baylor Ballpark	1-8	Blank (11–1)	Baxendale (7–5)	-	5,007	42-20	0–1
64	6/10/12	#4 Baylor	Baylor Ballpark	5-4	Daniel (2–0)	Garner (3-3)	-	5,038	43-20	1-1
65	6/11/12	#4 Baylor	Baylor Ballpark	1-0 (10)	Suggs (7–0)	Newman (4-4)	-	5,059	44-20	2–1

College World Series

#	Date	Opponent	Location	Score	Win	Loss	Save	Att	Record	CWS Record
66	6/16/12	Kent State	TD Ameritrade Park	8-1	Baxendale (8–5)	Starn (11–4)	Moore (3)	23,980	45-20	1–0
67	6/18/12	#7 South Carolina	TD Ameritrade Park	2-1	Stanek (8–4)	Holmes (7–2)	Astin (11)	23,537	46-20	2–0
68	6/21/12	#7 South Carolina	TD Ameritrade Park	0-2	Montgomery (6–1)	Fant (2–3)	Price (13)	23,593	46-21	2–1
69	6/22/12	#7 South Carolina	TD Ameritrade Park	2-3	Price (5–4)	Suggs (7–1)	-	22,184	46-22	2-2

== Rankings ==
Ranking movements Legend: ██ Increase in ranking ██ Decrease in ranking — = Not ranked т = Tied with team above or below
	Week																		
Poll	Pre	1	2	3	4	5	6	7	8	9	10	11	12	13	14	15	16	17	Final
Coaches'	8	8*	7	6	7	3	3	9	9т	15	17	13	13	18	14т	20	20*	20*	3
Baseball America	4	4	4	4	4	3	3	13	11	17	21	18	20	—	25	—	—*	—*	6
Collegiate Baseball^	8	8	7	7	5	4	4	11	9	16	20	13	13	17	14	19	11	6	3
NCBWA†	6	5	7	7	5	3	3	11	10	15	17	14	16	18	14	20	10	6	3

^ Collegiate Baseball ranked 40 teams in their preseason poll, but only ranked 30 teams weekly during the season.
† NCBWA ranks 30 teams in their preseason poll, but only ranks 25 teams weekly during the season.
* A new poll was not released for this week, so for comparison purposes, the previous week's ranking is inserted in this week's slot.

== Razorbacks in the 2012 MLB draft ==
Player	Position	Round	Overall	MLB team
Matt Reynolds	3B	2	71	New York Mets
Nolan Sanburn	RHP	2	74	Oakland Athletics
Teddy Stankiewicz	RHP	2	75	New York Mets
D’Vone McClure	OF	4	143	Cleveland Indians
Ty Buttrey	RHP	4	151	Boston Red Sox
Colin Poche	LHP	5	162	Baltimore Orioles
Shilo McCall	OF	9	298	San Francisco Giants
DJ Baxendale	RHP	10	310	Minnesota Twins
Tim Carver	SS	19	608	Philadelphia Phillies
Sam Bates	OF	28	853	Kansas City Royals
Randall Fant	LHP	29	893	Cleveland Indians
Derrick Bleeker	RHP/OF	37	1122	Baltimore Orioles
Jacob Morris	OF	37	1133	Cleveland Indians
Italics denotes an incoming Razorback prospect.
