= 2012 LSU Tigers baseball team =

American college baseball season

2012 LSU Tigers baseball

SEC Champions SEC Western Division Champion
- Conference: Southeastern Conference
- West

Ranking
- Coaches: No. 11
- CB: No. 9
- Record: 47–18 (19–11 SEC)
- Head coach: Paul Mainieri (6th season)
- Hitting coach: Javi Sanchez
- Pitching coach: Alan Dunn
- Home stadium: Alex Box Stadium

2012 Southeastern Conference baseball standings
	Conf.				Overall
Team	W		L	PCT	W		L	PCT
Eastern
No. 2 South Carolina ^{x}‍‍‍^{y}	18	–	11	.621	49	–	20	.710
No. 6 Florida ‍‍‍^{y}	18	–	12	.600	47	–	20	.701
No. 19 Kentucky ‍‍‍^{y}	18	–	12	.600	45	–	18	.714
No. 25 Vanderbilt ‍‍‍^{y}	16	–	14	.533	35	–	28	.556
Georgia ‍‍‍	14	–	15	.483	31	–	26	.544
Tennessee ‍‍‍	8	–	22	.267	24	–	31	.436
Western
No. 11 LSU ^{x}‍†‍‍^{y}	19	–	11	.633	47	–	18	.723
No. 3 Arkansas ‍‍‍^{y}	16	–	14	.533	46	–	22	.676
Mississippi State ‍‍‡‍^{y}	16	–	14	.533	40	–	24	.625
Ole Miss ‍‍‍^{y}	14	–	16	.467	37	–	26	.587
Auburn ‍‍‍	13	–	17	.433	31	–	28	.525
Alabama ‍‍‍	9	–	21	.300	21	–	34	.382
x – Division champion † – Conference champion ‡ – Tournament champion y – Invited to the NCAA tournament As of June 26, 2012; Rankings from Coaches' Poll

The 2012 LSU Tigers baseball team represented Louisiana State University in the NCAA Division I baseball season of 2012. The Tigers played their home games in the new Alex Box Stadium, which opened in 2009.

The team was coached by Paul Mainieri who was in his sixth season at LSU. The Tigers' season ended at the hands of Stony Brook after a shocking upset in the Baton Rouge Super Regional.

== Personnel ==
=== Roster ===
2012 LSU Tigers baseball roster
Pitchers: 10 Aaron Nola - Freshman; 12 Kevin Gausman - Sophomore; 18 Michael Reed - Sophomore; 21 Joe Broussard - Sophomore; 24 Cody Glenn - Freshman; 25 Joey Bourgeois - Junior; 30 Carson Baranik - Freshman; 32 Aaron Johnson - Freshman; 33 Kevin Berry - Junior; 37 Ryan Eades - Sophomore; 38 Nick Rumbelow - Sophomore; 39 Kurt McCune - Sophomore; 41 Nick Goody - Junior; 44 Braden Strickland - Freshman; 47 Christian Trent - Freshman; 49 Brent Bonvillain - Junior; 58 Chris Cotton - Junior	Catchers: 2 Tyler Moore - Sophomore; 20 Jordy Snikeris - Senior; 22 Evan Powell - Freshman; 26 Tyler Ross - Freshman; 35 Jackson Slaid - Sophomore	Infielders: 2 Tyler Moore - Freshman; 8 Mason Katz - Junior; 11 Tyler Hanover - Junior; 17 Jared Foster - Freshman; 22 Evan Powell - Freshman; 23 JaCoby Jones - Sophomore; 27 Beau Didier - Sophomore; 28 Casey Yocom - Junior; 36 Austin Nola - Senior	Outfielders: 4 Raph Rhymes - Junior; 5 Chris Sciambra - Freshman; 8 Mason Katz - Junior; 9 Arby Fields - Junior; 13 Alex Edward - Junior; 35 Jackson Slaid - Sophomore; Utility: 7 Grant Dozar - Junior

2012 LSU Tigers Baseball Roster & Bios http://www.lsusports.net/SportSelect.dbml?SPSID=27867&SPID=2173&Q_SEASON=2011

=== Coaching staff ===
2012 LSU Tigers baseball coaching staff
- Paul Mainieri - Head coach - 5 years at LSU
- Alan Dunn - Pitching coach - 1 year
- Javi Sanchez - Hitting coach - 4 years
- Will Davis - Volunteer assistant coach - 4 years
- Jeremy Phillips - Strength & Conditioning Coordinator - 1 year
- Ross Brezovsky - Coordinator of Baseball Operations - 3 years

2011 LSU Tigers Baseball Coaches & Bios http://www.lsusports.net/SportSelect.dbml?SPSID=28707&SPID=2173&Q_SEASON=2011

== Schedule/Results ==
2012 LSU Tigers baseball game log

Regular Season

February
#	Date	Opponent	Site/stadium	Score	Win	Loss	Save	Attendance		Overall record	SEC record
#	Date	Opponent	Site/stadium	Score	Win	Loss	Save	Paid	Actual	Overall record	SEC record
1	Feb 17	Air Force	Baton Rouge, La. (Alex Box Stadium)	10-2						1-0	-
2	Feb 18	Alcorn St.	Baton Rouge, La. (Alex Box Stadium)	19-0						2-0	-
3	Feb 19	Air Force	Baton Rouge, La. (Alex Box Stadium)	4-0						3-0	-
4	Feb 22	McNeese St.	Baton Rouge, La. (Alex Box Stadium)	11-4						4-0	-
5	Feb 24	Appalachian St.	Baton Rouge, La. (Alex Box Stadium)	4-0						5-0	-
6	Feb 25	Appalachian St.	Baton Rouge, La. (Alex Box Stadium)	0-1						5-1	-
7	Feb 26	Appalachian St.	Baton Rouge, La. (Alex Box Stadium)	1-11						5-2	-
8	Feb 28	Grambling	Baton Rouge, La. (Alex Box Stadium)	17-10						6-2	-
9	Feb 29	McNeese St.	Lake Charles, La. (Cowboy Diamond)	19-10						7-2	-

March
#	Date	Opponent	Site/stadium	Score	Win	Loss	Save	Attendance		Overall record	SEC record
#	Date	Opponent	Site/stadium	Score	Win	Loss	Save	Paid	Actual	Overall record	SEC record
10	Mar 02	Dartmouth	Baton Rouge, La. (Alex Box Stadium)	8-4						8-2	-
11	Mar 03	Dartmouth	Baton Rouge, La. (Alex Box Stadium)	16-3						9-2	-
12	Mar 04	Dartmouth	Baton Rouge, La. (Alex Box Stadium)	5-4						10-2	-
13	Mar 06	Tulane	New Orleans, La. (Turchin Stadium)	5-0						11-2	-
14	Mar 09	Michigan	Baton Rouge, La. (Alex Box Stadium)	6-0						12-2	-
15	Mar 10	Michigan	Baton Rouge, La. (Alex Box Stadium)	6-4						13-2	-
16	Mar 11	Notre Dame	Baton Rouge, La. (Alex Box Stadium)	1-7						13-3	-
17	Mar 12	Notre Dame	Baton Rouge, La. (Alex Box Stadium)	RAINOUT							
18	Mar 14	Northwestern St.	Baton Rouge, La. (Alex Box Stadium)	13-0						14-3	-
19	Mar 16	#21 Mississippi St.	Baton Rouge, La. (Alex Box Stadium)	3-2 (10)						15-3	1-0
20	Mar 17	#21 Mississippi St.	Baton Rouge, La. (Alex Box Stadium)	4-3						16-3	2-0
21	Mar 18	#21 Mississippi St.	Baton Rouge, La. (Alex Box Stadium)	1-7						16-4	2-1
22	Mar 20	Southern	Baton Rouge, La. (Alex Box Stadium)	15-5						17-4	-
23	Mar 23	Auburn	Auburn, Ala. (Samford Stadium)	3-4						17-5	2-2
24	Mar 24	Auburn	Auburn, Ala. (Samford Stadium)	2-3 (10)						17-6	2-3
25	Mar 25	Auburn	Auburn, Ala. (Samford Stadium)	4-3						18-6	3-3
26	Mar 28	UL-Lafayette	Baton Rouge, La. (Alex Box Stadium)	5-0						19-6	-
27	Mar 30	#3 Arkansas	Baton Rouge, La. (Alex Box Stadium)	10-6						20-6	4-3
28	Mar 31	#3 Arkansas	Baton Rouge, La. (Alex Box Stadium)	2-1						21-6	5-3

April
#	Date	Opponent	Site/stadium	Score	Win	Loss	Save	Attendance		Overall record	SEC record
#	Date	Opponent	Site/stadium	Score	Win	Loss	Save	Paid	Actual	Overall record	SEC record
29	Apr 01	#3 Arkansas	Baton Rouge, La. (Alex Box Stadium)	3-2 (11)						22-6	6-3
30	Apr 03	Louisiana College	Baton Rouge, La. (Alex Box Stadium)	10-2						23-6	-
31	Apr 05	#1 Florida	Gainesville, Fla. (McKethan Stadium)	7-6						24-6	7-3
32	Apr 06	#1 Florida	Gainesville, Fla. (McKethan Stadium)	0-7						24-7	7-4
33	Apr 07	#1 Florida	Gainesville, Fla. (McKethan Stadium)	8-7						25-7	8-4
34	Apr 10	Alcorn St.	Baton Rouge, La. (Alex Box Stadium)	7-2						26-7	-
35	Apr 11	Southern Miss	Metairie, La. (Zephyr Field)	8-3						27-7	-
36	Apr 13	Alabama	Baton Rouge, La. (Alex Box Stadium)	10-2						28-7	9-4
37	Apr 14	Alabama	Baton Rouge, La. (Alex Box Stadium)	7-1						29-7	10-4
38	Apr 15	Alabama	Baton Rouge, La. (Alex Box Stadium)	5-1						30-7	11-4
39	Apr 18	Lamar	Baton Rouge, La. (Alex Box Stadium)	5-4						31-7	-
40	Apr 20	#3 Kentucky	Lexington, Ky. (Cliff Hagan Stadium)	5-4						32-7	12-4
41	Apr 21	#3 Kentucky	Lexington, Ky. (Cliff Hagan Stadium)	1-8						32-8	12-5
42	Apr 22	#3 Kentucky	Lexington, Ky. (Cliff Hagan Stadium)	6-7						32-9	12-6
43	Apr 25	Southeastern Louisiana	Baton Rouge, La. (Alex Box Stadium)	4-3						33-9	-
44	Apr 27	Georgia	Baton Rouge, La. (Alex Box Stadium)	6-5						34-9	13-6
45	Apr 28	Georgia	Baton Rouge, La. (Alex Box Stadium)	8-4						35-9	14-6
46	Apr 29	Georgia	Baton Rouge, La. (Alex Box Stadium)	3-5						35-10	14-7

May
#	Date	Opponent	Site/stadium	Score	Win	Loss	Save	Attendance		Overall record	SEC record
#	Date	Opponent	Site/stadium	Score	Win	Loss	Save	Paid	Actual	Overall record	SEC record
47	May 1	Tulane	Baton Rouge, La. (Alex Box Stadium)	9-5						36-10	-
48	May 4	#24 Ole Miss	Oxford, Miss. (Oxford-University Stadium)	4-3 (13)						37-10	15-7
49	May 5	#24 Ole Miss	Oxford, Miss. (Oxford-University Stadium)	4-7						37-11	15-8
50	May 6	#24 Ole Miss	Oxford, Miss. (Oxford-University Stadium)	12-3						38-11	16-8
51	May 11	Vanderbilt	Baton Rouge, La. (Alex Box Stadium)	2-1						39-11	17-8
52	May 12	Vanderbilt	Baton Rouge, La. (Alex Box Stadium)	3-6						39-12	17-9
53	May 13	Vanderbilt	Baton Rouge, La. (Alex Box Stadium)	4-5 (10)						39-13	17-10
54	May 15	Nicholls	Baton Rouge, La. (Alex Box Stadium)	9-6						40-13	-
55	May 18	#2 South Carolina	Columbia, S.C. (Carolina Stadium)	5-2						41-13	18-10
56	May 18	#2 South Carolina	Columbia, S.C. (Carolina Stadium)	4-5						41-14	18-11
56	May 19	#2 South Carolina	Columbia, S.C. (Carolina Stadium)	3-2 (10)						42-14	19-11

Post-Season

SEC Tournament
#	Date	Opponent	Site/stadium	Score	Win	Loss	Save	Attendance		Overall record	SECT record
#	Date	Opponent	Site/stadium	Score	Win	Loss	Save	Paid	Actual	Overall record	SECT record
57	May 23	Mississippi St.	Hoover, Ala. (Regions Park)	2-3						42-15	0-1
58	May 24	Ole Miss	Hoover, Ala. (Regions Park)	11-2						43-15	1-1
59	May 25	Mississippi St.	Hoover, Ala. (Regions Park)	3-4 (10)						43-16	1-2

NCAA Tournament: Regionals
#	Date	Opponent	Site/stadium	Score	Win	Loss	Save	Attendance		Overall record	NCAAT record
#	Date	Opponent	Site/stadium	Score	Win	Loss	Save	Paid	Actual	Overall record	NCAAT record
62	Jun 01	UL-Monroe	Baton Rouge, La. (Alex Box Stadium)	4-1						44-16	1-0
63	Jun 02	#16 Oregon St.	Baton Rouge, La. (Alex Box Stadium)	7-1						45-16	2-0
64	Jun 03	#16 Oregon St.	Baton Rouge, La. (Alex Box Stadium)	6-5 (10)						46-16	3-0

NCAA Tournament: Super Regionals
#	Date	Opponent	Site/stadium	Score	Win	Loss	Save	Attendance		Overall record	NCAAT record
#	Date	Opponent	Site/stadium	Score	Win	Loss	Save	Paid	Actual	Overall record	NCAAT record
62	Jun 08	#25 Stony Brook	Baton Rouge, La. (Alex Box Stadium)	5-4 (12)						47-16	4-0
63	Jun 09	#25 Stony Brook	Baton Rouge, La. (Alex Box Stadium)	1-3						47-17	4-1
64	Jun 10	#25 Stony Brook	Baton Rouge, La. (Alex Box Stadium)	2-7						47-18	4-2

*Rankings are based on the team's current ranking in the Baseball America poll the week LSU faced each opponent.

== Ranking movements ==
Ranking movements Legend: ██ Increase in ranking ██ Decrease in ranking
	Week																			
Poll	Pre	1	2	3	4	5	6	7	8	9	10	11	12	13	14	15	16	17	18	Final
Coaches'	14	14*	20	15	16	13	14	12	7	4	6	4	4	9	6	7	11			
Baseball America	8	7	14	13	13	11	15	12	5	4	4	4	3	9	2	3	9			
Collegiate Baseball^	12	9	13	11	10	8	12	7	3	1	3	5	4	4	2	1	1	9	9	
NCBWA†	12	10	16	15	13	12	14	12	8	5	6	4	4	9	7	8	8	10	10	

^ Collegiate Baseball ranked 40 teams in their preseason poll, but only ranked 30 teams weekly during the season.
† NCBWA ranks 30 teams in their preseason poll, but only ranks 25 teams weekly during the season.
* A new poll was not released for this week, so for comparison purposes, the previous week's ranking is inserted in this week's slot.

== LSU Tigers in the 2012 Major League Baseball draft ==
The following members and future members (denoted by *) of the LSU Tigers baseball program were drafted in the 2012 MLB draft.

Player	Position	Round	Overall	MLB Team
