= Alex Yarbrough =

American baseball player (born 1991)

- Second baseman
- Born: August 3, 1991 (age 34); Allen, Texas, U.S.
- Bats: Switch Throws: Right
- Stats at Baseball Reference

Alexander Wyatt Yarbrough (born August 3, 1991) is an American former professional baseball second baseman. He played in Minor League Baseball for the Miami Marlins organization.

== College career ==
A three-year starter for the Ole Miss Rebels from 2010 to 2012, Yarbrough earned second-team All-Southeastern Conference honors as a sophomore, leading the Rebels in extra-base hits and multiple-hit games.

Yarbrough became one of the best infielders in college baseball as a junior, hitting .380 while committing only three errors all season. He earned first-team All-American honors. He was also a finalist for the Dick Howser Trophy and the Golden Spikes Award. Yarbrough also earned first-team All-SEC honors and was named the SEC all-defensive team. After the 2011 season, he played collegiate summer baseball with the Cotuit Kettleers of the Cape Cod Baseball League.

== Professional career ==
=== Los Angeles Angels of Anaheim ===
Yarbrough was drafted by the Los Angeles Angels of Anaheim in the fourth round (147th overall) of the 2012 Major League Baseball draft. After signing, Yarbrough spent most of the rest of the 2012 season with the Cedar Rapids Kernels before being promoted to the Arkansas Travelers. In 63 games between the two affiliates, he batted .275/.307/.393 with 27 RBI. In 2013, Yarbrough played for the Inland Empire 66ers where he slashed .313/.341/.459 with 11 home runs, 80 RBI, 32 doubles, and ten triples in 136 games; In 2014, he played with the Double-A Arkansas Travelers where he compiled a .285 batting average with five home runs, 77 RBI, and 38 doubles in 136 games. Yarbrough spent 2015 with the Triple-A Salt Lake Bees where he batted .236 with three home runs and 48 RBI in 128 games. He split the 2016 season between Salt Lake and Arkansas, where he posted a combined .265 batting average with four home runs and 55 RBI in 135 games between the two affiliates.

=== Miami Marlins ===
On December 8, 2016, at the Winter Meetings, the Miami Marlins selected Yarbrough from the Angels in the minor league phase of the Rule 5 draft. In 2017, he played for the Jacksonville Jumbo Shrimp where he batted .231 with four home runs and 30 RBIs in 111 games. He retired from professional baseball on February 14, 2018.
