= Nick Petree =

American baseball player and coach

Biographical details
- Born: July 16, 1990 (age 36); Sedalia, Missouri, U.S.

Playing career
- 2011–2013: Missouri State
- 2013: State College Spikes
- 2014: Peoria Chiefs
- 2014–2015: Palm Beach Cardinals
- 2014–2015: Springfield Cardinals
- Position: Pitcher

Coaching career (HC unless noted)
- 2017–2018: State Fair C. C. (Asst)

Accomplishments and honors

Awards
- First Team All-American (2012)

Nick Scott Petree (born July 16, 1990) is an American former professional baseball pitcher, who last pitched in Minor League Baseball for the St. Louis Cardinals organization. Petree played college baseball for the Missouri State Bears, earning All-American honors in three seasons.

== College career ==
Petree enrolled at Missouri State University to play college baseball for the Missouri State Bears. After sitting out his freshman year recovering from Tommy John surgery, Petree returned for the 2011 season, going 9-2 with a 2.81 earned run average (ERA), earning Freshman All-American and Missouri Valley Conference Freshman of the Year honors.

As a redshirt sophomore in 2012, Petree made his mark as one of the best pitchers in college baseball, going 10-4 with 1.01 ERA, the lowest ERA in college baseball. Petree was named the Collegiate Baseball Louisville Slugger National Player of the Year, the Missouri Valley Conference Pitcher of the Year and earned first-team All-American honors. Petree was also a finalist for the Dick Howser Trophy and the Golden Spikes Award. Petree went 10-4 with a 1.01 ERA in his redshirt junior (academic senior) season.

== Professional career ==
In May 2013, Baseball America named Petree the #259 prospect for the 2013 Major League Baseball draft. He was selected in the ninth round by the St. Louis Cardinals. Petree played a shortened season for the State College Spikes. He was named the 2013 Spikes Pitcher of the Year. In 2014, Petree started the season playing for the Peoria Chiefs of the Class A Midwest League. On May 4, he was then called up to the Palm Beach Cardinals of the Class A Florida State League. On September 1, Petree was called up to the Double-A Springfield Cardinals of the Texas League.

Petree was the opening day starter for Springfield in 2015, pitching for both Springfield and Palm Beach during the season. Following the season, an MRI revealed additional damage in Petree's throwing elbow, which would necessitate additional surgery. On March 1, 2016, Petree retired from professional baseball. He compiled a 17-14 record with a 2.94 ERA over his minor league career.
