= 2012 Mississippi State Bulldogs baseball team =

American college baseball season

2012 Mississippi State Bulldogs baseball

SEC Baseball Tournament champion
- Conference: Southeastern Conference
- West
- Record: 40–24 (16–14 SEC)
- Head coach: John Cohen (4th season)
- Hitting coach: Lane Burroughs (4th season)
- Pitching coach: Butch Thompson (4th season)
- Home stadium: Dudy Noble Field

2012 Southeastern Conference baseball standings
	Conf.				Overall
Team	W		L	PCT	W		L	PCT
Eastern
No. 2 South Carolina ^{x}‍‍‍^{y}	18	–	11	.621	49	–	20	.710
No. 6 Florida ‍‍‍^{y}	18	–	12	.600	47	–	20	.701
No. 19 Kentucky ‍‍‍^{y}	18	–	12	.600	45	–	18	.714
No. 25 Vanderbilt ‍‍‍^{y}	16	–	14	.533	35	–	28	.556
Georgia ‍‍‍	14	–	15	.483	31	–	26	.544
Tennessee ‍‍‍	8	–	22	.267	24	–	31	.436
Western
No. 11 LSU ^{x}‍†‍‍^{y}	19	–	11	.633	47	–	18	.723
No. 3 Arkansas ‍‍‍^{y}	16	–	14	.533	46	–	22	.676
Mississippi State ‍‍‡‍^{y}	16	–	14	.533	40	–	24	.625
Ole Miss ‍‍‍^{y}	14	–	16	.467	37	–	26	.587
Auburn ‍‍‍	13	–	17	.433	31	–	28	.525
Alabama ‍‍‍	9	–	21	.300	21	–	34	.382
x – Division champion † – Conference champion ‡ – Tournament champion y – Invited to the NCAA tournament As of June 26, 2012; Rankings from Coaches' Poll

The 2012 Mississippi State Bulldogs baseball team represented Mississippi State University in the NCAA Division I baseball season of 2012. The team was coached by John Cohen, in his 13th year as a collegiate head coach, and his 4th at Mississippi State.

Mississippi State wins the 2012 SEC Tournament championship winning a school record 5 games against 1 loss, is then eliminated in the NCAA tournament in the Tallahassee Regional, and finishes ranked in some polls.

== Pre-season ==
The 2012 Mississippi State Bulldogs Baseball team was looking to continue rebuilding after the 2011 MSU Baseball team had a winning record and returned to the NCAA tournament, both for the first time in 4 years. The 2012 MSU baseball team welcomes a recruiting class ranked 14th by Baseball America, which is the third consecutive top 20 ranked recruiting class.

The SEC coaches pick this team to finish 5th in the West division. The team is not ranked in the top 25 in any of the four major preseason polls. The team went on to finish tied for 2nd in the SEC West, to win the SEC Tournament and at one point is ranked as high as 14th.

Senior RHP Caleb Reed is selected 1st team NCBWA Preseason All-American. Reed is also selected 1st team SEC Preseason All-Conference by College Sports Madness, while sophomore OF C.T. Bradford, and sophomore SS Adam Frazier are selected 2nd team.

== Regular season ==
Going 4–0 to open the season, they were ranked 18th on February 27, 2012, by Perfect Game. They will end the regular season ranked as high as 21st (See Ranking Movements below).

Mississippi State entered the final series of the regular season at 31–21, 13–14 in conference play. In that final series, they swept, at that time, #2 Kentucky, at home, in Starkville, to finish the regular season 34–21, 16–14. For the regular season, they won all five conference series at home, including a sweep of Tennessee in addition to Kentucky, and lost all five series on the road, including being swept by South Carolina.

Games Schedule, results, and box scores can be found at the reference.

== SEC Tournament ==
In the SEC tournament, with all rankings according to the final Coaches' Poll, Mississippi State beat #3 Arkansas then #11 LSU, before losing to #19 Kentucky; they then beat #11 LSU, again, #19 Kentucky, winning the rematch, and #25 Vanderbilt to win the SEC Tournament championship. SS Adam Frazier is the Tournament MVP. Frazier, OF Demarcus Henderson, and P Jonathan Holder make the All-Tournament team. Frazier, in 6 games, hits 0.522 with one double, has an OBP of 0.560, scores 4 runs, has 3 rbi, and successfully hits a sacrifice bunt. Holder, in 4 games, has 3 saves and 1 win, giving up 0 runs.

In the championship game Mississippi State beats Vanderbilt, shutting them out 3–0. Pitchers Brandon Woodruff, Ross Mitchell, Caleb Reed, and Chris Stratton combine for the shutout.

After, going 5–1 in, and winning the SEC Tournament, at 39–22 overall, they are ranked as high as 14th by Baseball America.

== NCAA tournament ==
In the NCAA tournament, Mississippi State is regionally seeded 2nd, in the Tallahassee Regional. They lose in an upset to 3rd seed Samford, then win to eliminate 4th seed UAB, and then lose to be eliminated by 3rd seed Samford. In the losing effort, four Mississippi State players make the 11 man, Regional All-Tournament team, Matthew Britton (FR 2B), Adam Frazier (SO SS), Wes Rea (FR 1B), and Mitch Slauter (JR C).

After the post season ends, going 1–2 in the NCAA tournament, they are ranked as high as 22nd by Baseball America.

== Season Awards ==
RHP Kendall Graveman is the first Mississippi State player to be named to this team, since the conference started this all-defensive team in 2008. He only committed 1 error in 89.2 innings pitched.

- SEC Coaches' All-Defensive Team.

RHP Jonathan Holder saw limited action as a true freshman, in 2012. He did lose the game, in relief, to eliminate Mississippi State from the NCAA tournament. But at one point, he set a school record scoreless streak at 27.1 innings, which was his entire start to the season. Overall, he had an ERA of 0.32, 30 strikeouts, and 5 base-on-balls, in 28.1 innings. The only runs given up were 2 runs, 1 earned, in 1.0 inning pitched, in the NCAA Regional elimination game. Overall, he went 2–1 with 9 saves. In the last 11 games, in which he appeared, he had 8 saves and went 1–1.

- SEC Coaches' All-Freshman Team.
- NCBWA Freshman All-American Team.
- Collegiate Baseball Freshman All-American.
- Baseball America's Louisville Slugger Freshmen All-American Team.
- Perfect Game Freshman All-American.

RHP Chris Stratton went 11–2 with a 2.38 ERA with 127 strikeouts and 25 base-on-balls in 109.2 innings. He was the first Consensus All-American for Mississippi State since Will Clark in 1985.

- C Spire Ferris Trophy for the best college baseball player in the state of Mississippi.
- Southeastern Conference Baseball Pitcher of the Year.
- Consensus All-American.
  - American Baseball Coaches Association All-American
  - Baseball America All-American
  - Collegiate Baseball All-American
  - National Collegiate Baseball Writers Association All-American

== MLB draft ==
Player	Position	Round	Overall	MLB team
Chris Stratton	RHP	1	20	San Francisco Giants
Nick Routt	LHP	16	502	Cincinnati Reds
Kendall Graveman	RHP	36	1097	Miami Marlins

NOTE: Kendall Graveman will not sign, finishes his senior year at Mississippi State and then goes in the 8th round the next year.

== Ranking movements ==
Ranking movements Legend: ██ Increase in ranking ██ Decrease in ranking
	Week																		
Poll	Pre	1	2	3	4	5	6	7	8	9	10	11	12	13	14	15	16	17	Final
Coaches'		*													25	22			
Baseball America				23	21								25		24	14	22	22	22
Collegiate Baseball^												29	30		21	17	24	24	24
NCBWA†	34														26	21	28	30	30

^ Collegiate Baseball ranked 40 teams in their preseason poll, but only ranked 30 teams weekly during the season.
† NCBWA ranks 30 teams in their preseason poll, but only ranks 25 teams weekly during the season.
* A new poll was not released for this week, so for comparison purposes, the previous week's ranking is inserted in this week's slot.

Notes: The Coaches' and Baseball America had no rankings for week 16 and 17, June 5 and June 11; the Final rank is used.

== Roster and Stats ==
=== Coaches ===
Name	Title	First season at MSU	Alma mater
John Cohen	Head coach	2009	Mississippi State University (1990)
Butch Thompson	Associate Head Coach	2009	Birmingham Southern (1992)
Lane Burroughs	Assistant coach	2009	Mississippi College (1995)

=== Players ===
#	Player	Pos	B	T	YR	Hometown	AVG%	G	AB	R	H	HR	RBI	SLG%	OB%	SB-SA	FLD%
2	Demarcus Henderson	OF	R	R	FR	Waynesboro, MS	.245	36	102	17	25	0	10	.275	.342	6–9	.919
3	Phillip Casey	2B/3B	L	R	FR	Sugar Land, TX	.206	20	34	6	7	1	7	.324	.372	1–2	1.000
5	Daryl Norris	3B	R	R	SO	Fairhope, AL	.273	45	139	17	38	1	25	.353	.380	2–3	.949
7	Taylor Stark	OF	R	R	SO	Flowood, MS	.245	17	49	8	12	0	4	.286	.339	2–3	.917
8	Sam Frost	2B	L	R	JR	Hoover, AL	.214	56	140	18	30	0	20	.271	.319	8–11	.917
9	Tyler Fullerton	OF	R	R	FR	Murfreesboro, TN	.215	35	93	12	20	0	7	.269	.318	1–2	.955
10	C.T. Bradford	OF	L	L	SO	Pace, FL	.258	34	124	19	32	2	17	.339	.345	3–4	.968
12	Adam Frazier	SS	L	R	SO	Bishop, GA	.371	64	245	45	91	0	26	.445	.482	9–15	.957
13	Brayden Jones	3B	R	R	FR	Madison, MS	.174	15	23	3	4	0	2	.217	.296	1–1	.813
15	Matthew Britton	2B	L	R	FR	Cullman, AL	.177	52	124	17	22	0	9	.185	.288	3–3	.947
17	Nick Ammirati	C	S	R	JR	Sparta, NJ	.250	13	12	0	3	0	2	.250	.308	0–1	1.000
22	Luis Pollorena	OF	L	L	JR	Laredo, TX	.182	15	11	3	2	0	1	.182	.231	0–0	.929
24	Brandon Woodruff	OF	L	R	FR	Wheeler, MS	.105	13	19	0	2	0	1	.105	.227	0–1	1.000
29	Mitch Slauter	C	R	R	JR	Olathe, KS	.232	64	220	35	51	3	23	.327	.354	0–2	.990
32	Trey Porter	1B	L	R	JR	Hurley, MS	.259	60	205	26	53	5	24	.376	.388	1–4	.933
34	Hunter Renfroe	OF	R	R	SO	Crystal Springs, MS	.252	61	230	24	58	4	25	.374	.328	7–8	.984
35	Wes Rea	1B	R	R	FR	Gulfport, MS	.249	64	217	24	54	5	41	.392	.326	0–2	.991
42	Brent Brownlee	OF	R	R	SR	Oxford, MS	.204	41	98	12	20	0	11	.235	.304	1–1	.980
49	Kendall Graveman	PR	R	R	JR	Alexander City, AL	.000	1	0	1	0	0	0	.000	.000	0–0	.972
_{99.}	² Totals	–	–	–	–	---------	.251	64	2085	287	524	21	255	.333	.358	45–72	.969
_{99.}	²² Opponents	–	–	–	–	---------	.240	64	2156	219	517	17	192	.313	.314	52–74	.975

NOTE: The use of _{99.} and ² have no significance other than to maintain Totals and Opponents at the bottom when sorted ascending for those columns.

=== Pitchers ===
#	Player	T	Yr	Hometown	ERA	W-L	G-GS	SV	IP	H	BB	SO	FLD%
44	Andrew Busby	R	JR	Gardendale, AL	0.00	0–0	2–0	0	1.0	1	0	1	1.000
14	Jonathan Holder	R	FR	Gulfport, MS	0.32	2–1	24–0	9	28.1	17	5	30	1.000
4	Ben Bracewell	R	SO	Chelsea, AL	0.93	0–0	9–3	0	19.1	13	10	19	.667
39	Tanner Gaines	R	FR	Baldwyn, MS	1.08	1–0	6–1	0	8.1	5	2	8	.500
48	Ross Mitchell	L	FR	Smyrna, TN	1.18	3–0	24–1	0	38.0	24	8	24	1.000
22	Luis Pollorena	L	JR	Laredo, TX	1.85	4–0	16–4	0	34.0	24	6	24	.929
28	Chris Stratton	R	JR	Tupelo, MS	2.38	11–2	17–12	1	109.2	84	25	127	.952
24	Brandon Woodruff	R	FR	Wheeler, MS	2.38	1–2	12–6	0	34.0	25	17	37	1.000
37	Caleb Reed	R	SR	Cleveland, MS	2.47	1–5	31–1	9	58.1	51	22	52	1.000
49	Kendall Graveman	R	JR	Alexander City, AL	2.81	4–4	16–16	0	89.2	84	21	59	.972
21	Jacob Lindgren	L	FR	Bay St. Louis, MS	3.18	2–2	14–2	1	28.1	31	7	24	1.000
31	Trevor Fitts	R	FR	Helena, AL	3.29	3–0	8–0	0	13.2	17	3	14	1.000
51	Evan Mitchell	R	SO	Marietta, GA	3.52	2–1	13–4	0	38.1	31	28	43	.900
7	Taylor Stark	R	SO	Flowood, MS	3.68	1–0	8–0	1	7.1	11	5	5	.917
36	Nick Routt	L	JR	Silver Spring, MD	3.80	3–5	18–7	0	45.0	58	15	39	.923
38	Will Cox	R	FR	Amory, MS	4.64	2–1	7–6	0	21.1	22	3	22	.800
18	Chad Girodo	L	JR	Hartselle, AL	5.87	0–1	11–0	0	7.2	13	1	6	1.000
10	C.T. Bradford	L	SO	Pace, FL	10.12	0–0	1–1	0	2.2	6	3	2	.968
_{99.}	² Totals	–	–	------	2.58	40–24	64–64	21	585.0	517	181	536	.969
_{99.}	²² Opponents	–	–	------	3.82	24–40	64–64	14	568.1	524	261	443	.975

NOTE: The use of _{99.} and ² have no significance other than to maintain Totals and Opponents at the bottom when sorted ascending for those columns.

=== Players Not Played ===
These players were on the roster, but did not appear in a game, and may have been redshirted or left the program.

#	Player	Pos	B	T	YR	Hometown
6	C.C. Watson	P	L	L	SO	Heflin, AL
25	Nick Flair	SS	R	R	FR	Belle Chasse, LA
33	Preston Brown	P	R	R	FR	Germantown, TN

== Schedule and results ==
2013 Mississippi State Bulldogs baseball game log
Regular season

February
Date	Opponent	Site/stadium	Score	Win	Loss	Save	Attendance	Overall record	SEC record
Feb 17	Washington State	Dudy Noble Field • Starkville, MS	6–2	Stratton (1–0)	Leckenby (0–1)	None	6,141	1–0	
Feb 19 (Note: Suspended due to rain on Feb 18 and completed on Feb 19.)	Washington State	Dudy Noble Field • Starkville, MS	5–6	LaRoy (1–0)	Reed (0–1)	Simon (1)		1–1	
Feb 19	Washington State	Dudy Noble Field • Starkville, MS	5–4	Stark (1–0)	Jackson (0–1)	None	6,006	2–1	
Feb 24	Kansas	Dudy Noble Field • Starkville, MS	1–0	Stratton (2–0)	Tanner (0–1)	None	5,817	3–1	
Feb 25	Miss. Valley State	Dudy Noble Field • Starkville, MS	13–5	Fitts (1–0)	Lacy (0–2)	None		4–1	
Feb 25	Kansas	Dudy Noble Field • Starkville, MS	3–1	E Mitchell (1–0)	Jordan (0–1)	Reed (1)	3,050	5–1	
Feb 26	Miss. Valley State	Dudy Noble Field • Starkville, MS	5–1	Cox (1–0)	Lostra (0–2)	Holder (1)	5,806	6–1	
Feb 29	Memphis	Dudy Noble Field • Starkville, MS	6–7	Eaton (1–0)	Reed (0–2)	None	5,777	6–2	

March
Date	Opponent	Site/stadium	Score	Win	Loss	Save	Attendance	Overall record	SEC record
Mar 2	Connecticut	Dudy Noble Field • Starkville, MS	5–4	Stratton (3–0)	Fischer(0–2)	None	5,635	7–2	
Mar 3	Lipscomb	Dudy Noble Field • Starkville, MS	6–4	Fitts (2–0)	Nunn (0–1)	Stark (1)		8–2	
Mar 3	Connecticut	Dudy Noble Field • Starkville, MS	3–1	Routt (1–0)	Marzi (0–1)	Reed (2)	6150	9–2	
Mar 4	Lipscomb	Dudy Noble Field • Starkville, MS	16–6	Holder (1–0)	Fonfara (0–2)	None	5,949	10–2	
Mar 6	Penn State	Dudy Noble Field • Starkville, MS	7–3	Gaines (1–0)	Franklin (0–1)	Reed (3)	5,684	11–2	
Mar 7	Penn State	Dudy Noble Field • Starkville, MS	10–6	Lindgren (1–0)	Dixon (0–1)	None	5,741	12–2	
Mar 9	Mercer	Dudy Noble Field • Starkville, MS	5–3	Stratton (4–0)	Love (2–1)	Reed (4)	5,706	13–2	
Mar 10	Mercer	Dudy Noble Field • Starkville, MS	1–6	Barker (2–0)	Routt (1–1)	None	6,032	13–3	
Mar 11	Mercer	Dudy Noble Field • Starkville, MS	3–1	Graveman (1–0)	Randall(1–2)	Reed (5)	5,740	14–3	
Mar 13	@SE Louisiana	Alumni Field • Hammond, LA	3–4	Cutura (1–1)	Girodo (0–1)	Lopez (6)	1,350	14–4	
Mar 14	@SE Louisiana	Alumni Field • Hammond, LA	1–5	Manuel (1–2)	Cox (1–1)	Hills (1)	1,580	14–5	
Mar 16	@LSU	Alex Box Stadium • Baton Rouge, LA	2–3(10)	Goody (1–0)	Reed (0–3)	None	10,830	14–6	0–1
Mar 17	@LSU	Alex Box Stadium • Baton Rouge, LA	3–4	Eades (4–1)	Routt (1–2)	Goody (2)	11,137	14–7	0–2
Mar 18	@LSU	Alex Box Stadium • Baton Rouge, LA	7–1	Graveman (2–0)	Nola (3–1)	None	10,610	15–7	1–2
Mar 21 (Note: Game was cancelled due to rain and was not rescheduled.)	Alabama A&M	Dudy Noble Field • Starkville, MS	RAIN						
Mar 23	Arkansas	Dudy Noble Field • Starkville, MS	11–2	Stratton (5–0)	Baxendale (5–1)	None	6,289	16–7	2–2
Mar 24	Arkansas	Dudy Noble Field • Starkville, MS	0–8	Stanek (6–0)	Routt (1–3)	None	6,763	16–8	2–3
Mar 25	Arkansas	Dudy Noble Field • Starkville, MS	5–8(11)	Suggs (2–0)	Reed (0–4)	Lynch (2)	6,228	16–9	2–4
Mar 27	Alcorn State	Dudy Noble Field • Starkville, MS	6–2	Cox (2–1)	Pomerlee (0–2)	None	5,781	17–9	
Mar 30	@Auburn	Hitchcock Field • Auburn, AL	5–3	Stratton (6–0)	Varnadore (1–3)	Reed (6)	2,656	18–9	3–4
Mar 31	@Auburn	Hitchcock Field • Auburn, AL	6–10	Kendall (4–0)	Routt (1–4)	None	3,522	18–10	3–5

April
Date	Opponent	Site/stadium	Score	Win	Loss	Save	Attendance	Overall record	SEC record
Apr 1	@Auburn	Hitchcock Field • Auburn, AL	2–8	Koger (2–1)	Graveman (2–1)	Smith (3)	3,458	18–11	3–6
Apr 3 (Note: Game was suspended due to rain and completed on May 8.)	Miss. Valley State	Dudy Noble Field • Starkville, MS	RAIN	See May 8					
Apr 6	Vanderbilt	Dudy Noble Field • Starkville, MS	7–4	Stratton (7–0)	Crawford (1–5)	Reed (7)	6,353	19–11	4–6
Apr 7	Vanderbilt	Dudy Noble Field • Starkville, MS	3–4(12)	Clinard (3–1)	Lindgren (1–1)	None	6,248	19–12	4–7
Apr 8	Vanderbilt	Dudy Noble Field • Starkville, MS	8–7	Pollorena (1–0)	Ziomek (2–6)	None	5,820	20–12	5–7
Apr 10	South Alabama	Dudy Noble Field • Starkville, MS	2–0(12)	Fitts (3–0)	Huffer (0–1)	None	5,812	21–12	
Apr 13	@South Carolina	Carolina Stadium • Columbia, SC	6–7	Beal (2–3)	Reed (0–5)	Price (2)	8,105	21–13	5–8
Apr 14	@South Carolina	Carolina Stadium • Columbia, SC	3–5	Montgomery (3–0)	Graveman (2–2)	Price (3)	8,242	21–14	5–9
Apr 15	@South Carolina	Carolina Stadium • Columbia, SC	4–6	Holmes (5–0)	E Mitchell (1–1)	Webb (2)	7,011	21–15	5–10
Apr 17	vs.Ole Miss	Trustmark Park • Pearl, MS	3–6	Buchanan (1–0)	Woodruff (0–1)	Chavez (1)	5,533	21–16	
Apr 19	Tennessee	Dudy Noble Field • Starkville, MS	2–1(11)	Reed (1–5)	Steckenrider (4–3)	None	6,388	22–16	6–10
Apr 20	Tennessee	Dudy Noble Field • Starkville, MS	7–1	Graveman (3–2)	Kidd (2–1)	None	7,968	23–16	6–11
Apr 21	Tennessee	Dudy Noble Field • Starkville, MS	3–2(14)	Pollorena (2–0)	Blount (2–3)	None	9,233	24–16	7–11
Apr 24	vs.Southern Miss	Trustmark Park • Pearl, MS	5–0	Routt (2–4)	Scarborough (1–2)	None	4,300	25–16	
Apr 27	Ole Miss	Dudy Noble Field • Starkville, MS	4–0	Stratton (8–0)	Wahl (5–1)	None	6,601	26–16	8–11
Apr 28	Ole Miss	Dudy Noble Field • Starkville, MS	2–6	Hively (4–3)	Graveman (3–3)	None	6,977	26–17	8–12
Apr 29	Ole Miss	Dudy Noble Field • Starkville, MS	4–2	Pollorena (3–0)	Bailey (1–1)	Reed (8)	6,650	27–17	9–12

May
Date	Opponent	Site/stadium	Score	Win	Loss	Save	Attendance	Overall record	SEC record
May 4	@Alabama	Sewell–Thomas Stadium • Tuscaloosa, AL	3–1	Stratton (9–0)	Turnbull (2–4)	Holder (2)	3,423	28–17	10–12
May 5	@Alabama	Sewell–Thomas Stadium • Tuscaloosa, AL	3–2	E Mitchell (2–1)	Keller (1–5)	Holder (3)	3,550	29–17	11–12
May 5	@Alabama	Sewell–Thomas Stadium • Tuscaloosa, AL	7–8	Hubbard (3–2)	Routt (2–5)	None	6,272	29–18	12–12
May 8 (Note: Makeup of Apr 3 game.)	Miss. Valley State	Dudy Noble Field • Starkville, MS	6–3	R Mitchell (1–0)	Lostra (3–9)	Lindgren (1)	5,496	30–18	
May 11	@Florida	Perry Field • Gainesville, FL	1–4	Randall (6–1)	Stratton (9–1)	Rodriguez (3)	3,875	30–19	12–13
May 12	@Florida	Perry Field • Gainesville, FL	2–0	Graveman (4–3)	Crawford (4–2)	Holder (4)	4,593	31–19	13–13
May 13	@Florida	Perry Field • Gainesville, FL	1–2	Maddox (3–2)	Lindgren (1–2)	None	3,299	31–20	13–14
May 15	Central Arkansas	Dudy Noble Field • Starkville, MS	0–2	McKinzie (1–1)	Woodruff (0–2)	Biggerstaff (1)	5,804	31–21	
May 17	Kentucky	Dudy Noble Field • Starkville, MS	3–1	Stratton (10–1)	T Rogers (6–4)	Holder (5)	6,146	32–21	14–14
May 18	Kentucky	Dudy Noble Field • Starkville, MS	4–3	Pollorena (4–0)	Grundy (4–3)	Holder (6)	6,478	33–21	15–14
May 19	Kentucky	Dudy Noble Field • Starkville, MS	11–3	Lindgren (2–2)	Littrell (8–1)	None	6,395	34–21	16–14

Postseason

SEC tournament
Date	Opponent	Site/stadium	Score	Win	Loss	Save	Attendance	Overall record	SECT Record
May 22	Arkansas	Hoover Metropolitan Stadium • Hoover, AL	9–1	Woodruff (1–2)	Stanek (6–4)	Holder (7)	5,489	35–21	1–0
May 23	LSU	Hoover Metropolitan Stadium • Hoover, AL	3–2	Stratton (11–1)	Broussard (4–1)	Holder (8)	7,019	36–21	2–0
May 24	Kentucky	Hoover Metropolitan Stadium • Hoover, AL	1–5	Grundy (5–3)	Graveman (4–4)	Phillips (7)	6,798	36–22	2–1
May 25	LSU	Hoover Metropolitan Stadium • Hoover, AL	4–3	Holder (2–0)	Goody (1–2)	None	9,067	37–22	3–1
May 26	Kentucky	Hoover Metropolitan Stadium • Hoover, AL	2–1	Routt (3–5)	Littrell (8–2)	Holder (9)	9,243	38–22	4–1
May 27	Vanderbilt	Hoover Metropolitan Stadium • Hoover, AL	3–0	R Mitchell (2–0)	Beede (1–5)	Stratton (1)	12,526	39–22	5–1

NCAA Tallahassee Regional
Date	Opponent	Site/stadium	Score	Win	Loss	Save	Attendance	Overall record	NCAAT record
Jun 1	Samford	Dick Howser Stadium • Tallahassee, FL	0–5	Basford (10–2)	Stratton (11–2)	None	3,154	39–23	0–1
June 2	UAB	Dick Howser Stadium • Tallahassee, FL	8–1	R Mitchell (3–0)	Nance (4–4)	Reed (9)	3,154	40–23	1–1
June 3	Samford	Dick Howser Stadium • Tallahassee, FL	2–3	Burns (4–1)	Holder (2–1)	Irby (10)	3,081	40–24	1–2
