= 2012 South Carolina Gamecocks baseball team =

American college baseball season

2012 South Carolina Gamecocks baseball

SEC Eastern Division champions Columbia Regional champions Columbia Super Regional champions

College World Series Runner-up vs. Arizona, L 0-2
- Conference: Southeastern Conference

Ranking
- Coaches: No. 2
- CB: No. 2
- Record: 49–20 (18–11 SEC)
- Head coach: Ray Tanner (16th season)
- Assistant coaches: Chad Holbrook (4th season); Jerry Meyers (2nd/10th season); Sammy Esposito (5th season)
- Home stadium: Carolina Stadium

2012 Southeastern Conference baseball standings
	Conf.				Overall
Team	W		L	PCT	W		L	PCT
Eastern
No. 2 South Carolina ^{x}‍‍‍^{y}	18	–	11	.621	49	–	20	.710
No. 6 Florida ‍‍‍^{y}	18	–	12	.600	47	–	20	.701
No. 19 Kentucky ‍‍‍^{y}	18	–	12	.600	45	–	18	.714
No. 25 Vanderbilt ‍‍‍^{y}	16	–	14	.533	35	–	28	.556
Georgia ‍‍‍	14	–	15	.483	31	–	26	.544
Tennessee ‍‍‍	8	–	22	.267	24	–	31	.436
Western
No. 11 LSU ^{x}‍†‍‍^{y}	19	–	11	.633	47	–	18	.723
No. 3 Arkansas ‍‍‍^{y}	16	–	14	.533	46	–	22	.676
Mississippi State ‍‍‡‍^{y}	16	–	14	.533	40	–	24	.625
Ole Miss ‍‍‍^{y}	14	–	16	.467	37	–	26	.587
Auburn ‍‍‍	13	–	17	.433	31	–	28	.525
Alabama ‍‍‍	9	–	21	.300	21	–	34	.382
x – Division champion † – Conference champion ‡ – Tournament champion y – Invited to the NCAA tournament As of June 26, 2012; Rankings from Coaches' Poll

The 2012 South Carolina Gamecocks baseball team represented the University of South Carolina in the 2012 NCAA Division I baseball season. The Gamecocks played their home games in Carolina Stadium. The team was coached by Ray Tanner, who was in his sixteenth season at Carolina.

== Personnel ==
=== Roster ===
2012 South Carolina Gamecocks roster
Pitchers: 6 Joel Seddon - Freshman; 10 Drake Thomason - Freshman; 14 Evan Beal - Freshman; 15 Nolan Belcher - Junior; 22 Matt Price - Junior; 23 Vince Fiori - Freshman; 25 Adam Westmoreland - Junior; 27 Forrest Koumas - Sophomore; 29 Michael Roth - Senior; 32 Ethan Carter - Junior; 34 Jordan Montgomery - Freshman; 35 Logan Munson - Senior; 36 Hunter Privette - Junior; 38 Tyler Webb - Junior; 39 Patrick Sullivan - Junior; 44 Colby Holmes - Junior	Infielders: 4 Connor Bright - Freshman; 8 TJ Costen - Freshman; 9 Joey Pankake - Freshman; 13 Christian Walker - Junior; 16 Chase Vergason - Junior; 19 Tanner Lovick - Junior; 20 LB Dantzler - Junior; 24 Brison Celek - Sophomore; 30 Erik Payne - Sophomore; 33 Kyle Martin - Freshman	Catchers: 5 Patrick Harrington - Freshman; 18 Dante Rosenberg - Junior; 21 Grayson Greiner - Freshman; Outfielders: 3 Tanner English - Freshman; 11 Sean Sullivan - Junior; 17 Seth Constable - Freshman; 26 Adam Matthews - Senior; 31 Evan Marzilli - Junior

2012 South Carolina Gamecocks Baseball Roster & Bios http://gamecocksonline.cstv.com/sports/m-basebl/mtt/scar-m-basebl-mtt.html

=== Coaching staff ===
2012 South Carolina Gamecocks baseball coaching staff
- 1 Ray Tanner - Head coach - 16 years
- 2 Chad Holbrook - Assistant coach - 4 years
- 12 Jerry Meyers - Assistant coach - 2 years / 10 years
- 41 Sammy Esposito - Assistant coach - 5 years
- 55 Drew Meyer - Assistant coach - Undergraduate

2012 South Carolina Gamecocks Baseball Coaches & Bios http://gamecocksonline.cstv.com/sports/m-basebl/mtt/scar-m-basebl-mtt.html#coaches

== Schedule ==
2012 South Carolina Gamecocks baseball game log
Regular season
February

#	Date	Opponent	Site/stadium	Score	Win	Loss	Save	Attendance	Overall record	SEC record
1	February 17	VMI	Carolina Stadium	2–1	Webb (1–0)	Watts (0–1)	Koumas (1)	8,242	1–0	–
2	February 18	VMI	Carolina Stadium	3–2	Carter (1–0)	Garrett (0–1)	None	7,675	2–0	–
3	February 18	VMI	Carolina Stadium	13–1	Holmes (1–0)	Brown (0–1)	None	7,336	3–0	–
4	February 24	Elon	Carolina Stadium	8–1	Roth (1–0)	Webb (1–1)	None	6,618	4–0	–
5	February 25	Elon	Carolina Stadium	3-2	Price (1-0)	Clark (1-1)	Koumas (2)	7,606	5–0	–
6	February 26	Elon	Carolina Stadium	6-0	Holmes (2-0)	Whitehead (0-1)	None	7,304	6–0	–
7	February 28	Presbyterian	Carolina Stadium	2-1	Belcher (1-0)	Dees (0-1)	Webb (1)	6,521	7–0	–

March

#	Date	Opponent	Site/stadium	Score	Win	Loss	Save	Attendance	Overall record	SEC record
8	March 2	vs. Clemson	Joe Riley Park	3-2^{11}	Koumas (1-0)	Gossett (0-1)	Belcher (1)	5,851	8–0	–
9	March 3	Clemson	Carolina Stadium	9-6	Beal (1-0)	Leone (2-1)	Belcher (2)	8,242	9–0	–
10	March 4	@Clemson	Doug Kingsmore Stadium	5-6	Firth (1-0)	Koumas (1-1)	None	6,039	9–1	–
11	March 7	UNC Asheville	Carolina Stadium	8-1	Seddon (1-0)	Roland (2-2)	None	6,403	10–1	–
12	March 9	Princeton	Carolina Stadium	2-1	Roth (2-0)	Hermans (1-1)	Beal (1)	6,813	11–1	–
13	March 10	Princeton	Carolina Stadium	6-1	Price (2-0)	Ford (0-2)	Koumas (3)	7,426	12–1	–
14	March 11	Princeton	Carolina Stadium	3-1	Holmes (3-0)	Bowman (1-1)	Beal (2)	7,122	13–1	–
15	March 13	Charleston Southern	Carolina Stadium	5-2	Westmoreland (1-0)	Buran (0-2)	Seddon (1)	6,836	14–1	–
16	March 14	Appalachian State	Carolina Stadium	6-4	Webb (2-0)	Farmer (1-1)	Beal (3)	7,278	15–1	–
17	March 16	@Kentucky	Cliff Hagan Stadium	3-4	Peterson (2-0)	Beal (1-1)	None	2,032	15–2	0–1
18	March 17	@Kentucky	Cliff Hagan Stadium	3-4	Reed (4-0)	Price (2-1)	Gott (4)	1,950	15–3	0–2
19	March 18	@Kentucky	Cliff Hagan Stadium	3-6	Wijas (2-0)	Belcher (1-1)	Gott (5)	2,571	15–4	0–3
20	March 20	@Furman	Fluor Field	8-5	Privette (1-0)	Wood (3-2)	Beal (4)	5,965	16–4	–
21	March 21	Wofford	Carolina Stadium	4-5^{11}	Eck (3-1)	Beal (1-2)	None	6,923	16–5	–
22	March 22	Florida	Carolina Stadium	9-3	Price (3-1)	Rodriguez (3-1)	None	8,242	17–5	1–3
23	March 23	Florida	Carolina Stadium	2-8	Johnson (4-0)	Koumas (1-2)	None	8,242	17–6	1–4
24	March 24	Florida	Carolina Stadium	4-5	Maddox (2-0)	Price (3-2)	None	8,242	17–7	1–5
25	March 27	@The Citadel	Joe Riley Park	7-3	Montgomery (1-0)	Tompkins (0-1)	None	4,417	18–7	–
26	March 30	@Vanderbilt	Hawkins Field	8-3	Roth (3-0)	Ziomek (2-4)	Price (1)	2,525	19–7	2–5
27	March 31	@Vanderbilt	Hawkins Field	4-12	Beede (1-3)	Beal (1-3)	Miller (2)	3,113	19–8	2–6

April

#	Date	Opponent	Site/stadium	Score	Win	Loss	Save	Attendance	Overall record	SEC record
28	April 1	@Vanderbilt	Hawkins Field	6-4^{13}	Montgomery (2-0)	Pfeifer (0-1)	None	2,851	20–8	3–6
29	April 4	@College of Charleston	Patriot's Point	7-0	Westmoreland (2-0)	West (2-3)	None	1,767	21–8	–
30	April 6	Tennessee	Carolina Stadium	4-5	Steckenrider (3-2)	Price (3-3)	Blount (8)	8,242	21–9	3–7
31	April 7	Tennessee	Carolina Stadium	2-1	Webb (3-0)	Watson (3-1)	None	7,448	22–9	4–7
32	April 8	Tennessee	Carolina Stadium	6-1	Holmes (4-0)	Williams (2-3)	Beal (5)	6,981	23–9	5–7
33	April 10	The Citadel	Carolina Stadium	8-0	Belcher (2-1)	Clarkson (1-3)	None	7,129	24–9	–
34	April 11	@Francis Marion	Clifford Cormell Field	4-5	Broderick (6-1)	Westmoreland (2-1)	Stoner (2)	1,755	24–10	–
35	April 13	Mississippi State	Carolina Stadium	7-6	Beal (2-3)	Reed (0-5)	Price (2)	8,105	25–10	6–7
36	April 14	Mississippi State	Carolina Stadium	5-3	Montgomery (3-0)	Graveman (2-2)	Price (3)	8,242	26–10	7–7
37	April 15	Mississippi State	Carolina Stadium	6-4	Holmes (5-0)	Mitchell (1-1)	Webb (2)	7,011	27–10	8–7
38	April 17	College of Charleston	Carolina Stadium	3-4	West (4-3)	Belcher (2-2)	Peterson (9)	6,913	27–11	–
39	April 20	@Auburn	Plainsman Park	12-5	Roth (4-0)	Varnadore (1-6)	None	2,949	28–11	9–7
40	April 21	@Auburn	Plainsman Park	5-3	Montgomery (4-0)	Jacobs (5-1)	Price (4)	3,701	29–11	10–7
41	April 22	@Auburn	Plainsman Park	11-7	Holmes (6-0)	Koger (2-4)	None	2,747	30–11	11–7
-	April 26	Alabama	Carolina Stadium	Suspended						
42	April 27	Alabama	Carolina Stadium	1-0	Webb (4-0)	Keller (1-3)	Price (5)	7,403	31–11	12–7
43	April 27	Alabama	Carolina Stadium	12-11	Belcher (3-2)	Keller (1-4)	None	8,242	32–11	13–7
44	April 28	Alabama	Carolina Stadium	9-1	Belcher (4-2)	Kamplain (1-4)	None	8,242	33–11	14–7

May

#	Date	Opponent	Site/stadium	Score	Win	Loss	Save	Attendance	Overall record	SEC record
45	May 2	Davidson	Carolina Stadium	2-1	Koumas (2-2)	Russell (4-5)	Price (6)	7,177	34–11	–
46	May 4	@Arkansas	Baum Stadium	8-6^{10}	Beal (3-3)	Astin (2-4)	Price (7)	8,982	35–11	15–7
47	May 5	@Arkansas	Baum Stadium	6-7	Wright (1-0)	Montgomery (4-1)	Astin (9)	8,774	35–12	15–8
48	May 6	@Arkansas	Baum Stadium	10-7	Price (4-3)	Baxendale (6-3)	None	8,461	36–12	16–8
49	May 9	Furman	Carolina Stadium	7-0	Seddon (2-0)	Carlson (1-5)	None	6,774	37–12	–
50	May 11	@Georgia	Foley Field	3-0	Roth (5-0)	Wood (6-2)	Price (8)	2,744	38–12	17–8
51	May 12	@Georgia	Foley Field	5-6	Nagel (1-1)	Price (4-4)	None	2,686	38–13	17–9
–	May 13	@Georgia	Foley Field	Cancelled						
–	May 15	USC Upstate	Carolina Stadium	Cancelled						
–	May 17	LSU	Carolina Stadium	Postponed						
52	May 18	LSU	Carolina Stadium	2-5	Gausman (9-1)	Roth (5-1)	None	7,914	38–14	17–10
53	May 18	LSU	Carolina Stadium	5-4	Webb (5-0)	Nola (6-4)	Price (9)	8,242	39–14	18–10
54	May 19	LSU	Carolina Stadium	2-3^{10}	Cotton (6-0)	Beal (3-4)	Goody (10)	8,242	39–15	18–11

Post-season
SEC Tournament

#	Date	Opponent	Site/stadium	Score	Win	Loss	Save	Attendance	Overall record	SECT record
55	May 23	Vanderbilt	Regions Park	2-3	Ziomek (5-6)	Webb (5-1)	Clinard (5)	6,860	39–16	0–1
56	May 24	Auburn	Regions Park	5-3	Roth (6-1)	Luckie (2-2)	Price (10)		40–16	1–1
57	May 25	Florida	Regions Park	2-7	Johnson (7-4)	Holmes (6-1)	None	9,067	40–17	1–2

NCAA Regionals

#	Date	Opponent	Site/stadium	Score	Win	Loss	Save	Attendance	Overall record	NCAAT record
58	June 1	Manhattan	Carolina Stadium	7-0	Holmes (7-1)	Sewitt (11-2)	None	7,043	41–17	1–0
59	June 2	Clemson	Carolina Stadium	5-4^{12}	Beal (4-4)	Brady (1-3)	None	8,242	42–17	2–0
60	June 3	Clemson	Carolina Stadium	4-3	Montgomery (5-1)	Haselden (4-2)	Webb (3)	8,242	43–17	3–0

NCAA Super Regionals

#	Date	Opponent	Site/stadium	Score	Win	Loss	Save	Attendance	Overall record	NCAAT record
61	June 9	Oklahoma	Carolina Stadium	5-0	Roth (7-1)	John (8-8)	None	8,242	44–17	4–0
-	June 10	Oklahoma	Carolina Stadium	Suspended						
62	June 11	Oklahoma	Carolina Stadium	5-1	Webb (6-1)	Okert (9-8)	Price (11)	8,242	45–17	5–0

College World Series

#	Date	Opponent	Site/stadium	Score	Win	Loss	Save	Attendance	Overall record	NCAAT record
63	June 16	Florida	TD Ameritrade Park	7-3	Roth (8-1)	Johnson (8-5)	Price (12)	25,291	46–17	6–0
64	June 18	Arkansas	TD Ameritrade Park	1-2	Stanek (8-4)	Holmes (7-2)	Astin (11)	23,537	46–18	6–1
-	June 20	Kent State	TD Ameritrade Park	Postponed						
65	June 21	Kent State	TD Ameritrade Park	4-1	Roth (9-1)	Skulina (11-3)	None		47–18	7–1
66	June 21	Arkansas	TD Ameritrade Park	2-0	Montgomery (6-1)	Fant (2-3)	Price (13)	23,593	48–18	8–1
67	June 22	Arkansas	TD Ameritrade Park	3-2	Price (5-4)	Suggs (7-1)	None	22,184	49–18	9–1
68	June 24	Arizona	TD Ameritrade Park	1-5	Wade (11-3)	Koumas (2-3)	None	24,748	49–19	9–2
69	June 25	Arizona	TD Ameritrade Park	1-4	Troupe (6-1)	Price (5-5)	None	23,872	49–20	9–3

2012 South Carolina Gamecocks Baseball Schedule http://gamecocksonline.cstv.com/sports/m-basebl/sched/scar-m-basebl-sched.html

== Honors and awards ==
- Michael Roth was named 2011-12 SEC H. Boyd McWhorter Male Scholar-Athlete Of The Year.
- Jordan Montgomery was named SEC Freshman of the Week on April 9.
- Grayson Greiner was named SEC Freshman of the Week on April 16.
- Michael Roth was named First-Team Capital One Academic All-American.
- Michael Roth was named SEC Baseball Scholar-Athlete of the Year.
- Christian Walker was named First Team All-SEC, Matt Price was named Second Team All-SEC, Tanner English, Grayson Greiner and Joey Pankake were named Freshman All-SEC, and Michael Roth and Evan Marzilli were named Defensive All-SEC.
- Adam Matthews was named MVP of the NCAA Columbia Regional. LB Dantzler, Colby Holmes, Jordan Montgomery, Joey Pankake and Chase Vergason were also named to the All-Tournament team.

== Rankings ==
Ranking movements Legend: ██ Increase in ranking ██ Decrease in ranking — = Not ranked
	Week																		
Poll	Pre	1	2	3	4	5	6	7	8	9	10	11	12	13	14	15	16	17	Final
Coaches'	2	2*	3	3	3	8	10	10	9	8	5	3	3	2	4	6	—	—	2
Baseball America	3	3	3	3	3	8	11	11	10	9	7	5	4	2	7	7	—	—	2
Collegiate Baseball^	2	2	2	2	2	6	14	18	18	13	7	4	3	3	3	2	2	2	2
NCBWA†	2	2	3	3	3	6	9	8	7	6	4	3	3	1	5	6	5	4	2

^ Collegiate Baseball ranked 40 teams in their preseason poll, but only ranked 30 teams weekly during the season.
† NCBWA ranks 30 teams in their preseason poll, but only ranks 25 teams weekly during the season.
* A new poll was not released for this week, so for comparison purposes, the previous week's ranking is inserted in this week's slot.

== Gamecocks in the 2012 MLB draft ==
The following members of the South Carolina Gamecocks baseball program were drafted in the 2012 Major League Baseball draft.

Player	Position	Round	Overall	MLB team
Christian Walker	1B	4th	132nd	Baltimore Orioles
Matt Price	RHP	7th	222nd	Baltimore Orioles
Evan Marzilli	OF	8th	273rd	Arizona Diamondbacks
Michael Roth	LHP	9th	297th	Los Angeles Angels of Anaheim
Adam Matthews	OF	29th	892nd	Cincinnati Reds
