= 2012 Alabama Crimson Tide baseball team =

American college baseball season

2012 Alabama Crimson Tide baseball
- Conference: Southeastern Conference
- West
- Record: 21–34 (9–21 SEC)
- Head coach: Mitch Gaspard (3rd season)
- Hitting coach: Andy Phillips
- Pitching coach: Dax Norris
- Home stadium: Sewell-Thomas Stadium

2012 Southeastern Conference baseball standings
	Conf.				Overall
Team	W		L	PCT	W		L	PCT
Eastern
No. 2 South Carolina ^{x}‍‍‍^{y}	18	–	11	.621	49	–	20	.710
No. 6 Florida ‍‍‍^{y}	18	–	12	.600	47	–	20	.701
No. 19 Kentucky ‍‍‍^{y}	18	–	12	.600	45	–	18	.714
No. 25 Vanderbilt ‍‍‍^{y}	16	–	14	.533	35	–	28	.556
Georgia ‍‍‍	14	–	15	.483	31	–	26	.544
Tennessee ‍‍‍	8	–	22	.267	24	–	31	.436
Western
No. 11 LSU ^{x}‍†‍‍^{y}	19	–	11	.633	47	–	18	.723
No. 3 Arkansas ‍‍‍^{y}	16	–	14	.533	46	–	22	.676
Mississippi State ‍‍‡‍^{y}	16	–	14	.533	40	–	24	.625
Ole Miss ‍‍‍^{y}	14	–	16	.467	37	–	26	.587
Auburn ‍‍‍	13	–	17	.433	31	–	28	.525
Alabama ‍‍‍	9	–	21	.300	21	–	34	.382
x – Division champion † – Conference champion ‡ – Tournament champion y – Invited to the NCAA tournament As of June 26, 2012; Rankings from Coaches' Poll

The 2012 Alabama Crimson Tide baseball team represented the University of Alabama in the 2012 NCAA Division I baseball season. The Crimson Tide play their home games in Sewell-Thomas Stadium.

== Personnel ==
=== 2012 Roster ===
2012 Alabama Crimson Tide roster
Pitchers: 11 Trey Pilkington - Junior; 16 Cary Baxter - (redshirt) Freshman; 17 Jay Shaw - (redshirt) Freshman; 20 Taylor Guilbeau - Freshman; 21 Adam Windsor - Junior; 22 Nathan Kennedy - Senior; 26 Justin Kamplain - Freshman; 27 Taylor Wolfe - Junior; 28 Jake Hubbard - Freshman; 29 Charley Sullivan - Junior; 33 Jason Zylstra - Senior; 35 Jon Keller - Freshman; 36 Troy Sutherland - Junior; 38 Judson Luther - (redshirt) Freshman; 44 Tucker Hawley - Junior; 50 Kelby Deerman - Junior; 55 Ian Gardeck - Junior	Catchers: 5 Brett Booth - Junior; 7 Ben Moore - Freshman; Infielders: 3 Kenny Roberts - Junior; 9 Jared Reaves - Senior; 14 AJ Cole - Freshman; 18 Austen Smith - Sophomore; 32 Spencer Turnbull - Freshman; 39 James Tullidge - Senior; 42 Allen Dye - Sophomore; 47 Chazz Otwell - Junior; 48 Zack Edel - Freshman	Outfielders: 1 Taylor Dugas - Senior; 2 Andrew Miller - Junior; 12 Brandt Hendricks - Junior; 15 Cameron Carlisle - Junior; 31 Windham Jackson - Freshman; 40 Jeremiah Tullidge - Sophomore; 45 Riley Colburn - Freshman; 46 Hunter Gregory - Senior; 49 Ryan Blanchard - Freshman; Utility: 6 Josh Rosecrans - Senior; 10 Jon Kelton - Senior; 24 Case Nixon - Sophomore

2012 Alabama Crimson Tide Baseball Roster

=== Coaching staff ===
2012 Alabama Crimson Tide baseball coaching staff
- 8 Mitch Gaspard – Head Coach - 12 years at Alabama (3rd as Head Coach)
- 13 Andy Phillips – Assistant Coach, Hitting Coach - 2nd year
- 4 Dax Norris – Assistant Coach, Pitching Coach, Recruiting Coordinator - 6 years
- 43 Bobby Barbier – Volunteer Coach - 3 years
- 19 Adam Pavkovich – Fifth-year student assistant coach
- 25 Josh Sanders – Fifth-year student assistant coach

== Schedule and results ==
2012 Alabama Crimson Tide baseball game log
Regular season
February (4–4)

#	Date	Opponent	Site/stadium	Score	Win	Loss	Save	Attendance	Overall record	SEC record
1	February 17	Florida Atlantic	Sewell-Thomas Stadium	2–5	R. Garton (1–0)	T. Guilbeau (0–1)	M. Sylvestri (1)	4,864	0–1	–
2	February 18	Florida Atlantic	Sewell-Thomas Stadium	2–9	J. Meiers (1–0)	C. Sullivan (0–1)	K. Alexander (1)	3,073	0–2	–
3	February 19	Florida Atlantic	Sewell-Thomas Stadium	4–9	R. Alvarez (1–0)	J. Kamplain (0–1)	None	3,043	0–3	–
4	February 24	Arkansas–Pine Bluff	Sewell-Thomas Stadium	14–0	T. Guilbeau (1–1)	T. Sechler (0–2)	None	3,102	1–3	–
5	February 25	Arkansas–Pine Bluff	Sewell-Thomas Stadium	7–0	C. Sullivan (1–1)	S. Jones (0–2)	None	3,202	2–3	–
6	February 26	Arkansas–Pine Bluff	Sewell-Thomas Stadium	9–3	J. Kamplain (1–1)	M. Newby (0–2)	None	3,209	3–3	–
7	February 28	South Alabama	Sewell-Thomas Stadium	4–3	J. Hubbard (1–0)	K. Bartsch (0–2)	I. Gardeck (1)	3,011	4–3	–
8	February 29	Southern Miss	Pete Taylor Park	2–14	A. Pierce (1–1)	C. Nixon (0–1)	None	3,9883	4–4	–

March (5–14)

#	Date	Opponent	Site/stadium	Score	Win	Loss	Save	Attendance	Overall record	SEC record
9	March 2	Tulane	Turchin Stadium	7–9	A. Garner (3–0)	T. Pilkington (0–1)	D. Ponder (2)	3,156	4–5	–
10	March 3	Tulane	Turchin Stadium	6–2	C. Sullivan (2–1)	T. Mapes (0–1)	J. Hubbard (1)	2,927	5–5	–
11	March 4	Tulane	Turchin Stadium	2–7	A. Facundus (2–0)	I. Gardeck (0–1)	None	3,495	5–6	–
12	March 6†	Auburn	Riverwalk Stadium	3–8	J. Jacobs (3–0)	S. Turnbull (0–1)	J. Bryant (1)	7,129	5–7	–
13	March 9	East Carolina	Sewell-Thomas Stadium	1–3	K. Brandt (3–1)	C. Sullivan (2–2)	T. Merritt (2)	3,390	5–8	–
14	March 10	#24 Louisville	Sewell-Thomas Stadium	7–6	J. Hubbard (2–0)	M. Koch (0–1)	None	3,234	6–8	–
15	March 11	Oral Roberts	Sewell-Thomas Stadium	2–3	A. Gonzalez (1–0)	J. Hubbard (2–1)	M. Rush (2)	3,111	6–9	–
16	March 13	Southern Miss	Sewell-Thomas Stadium	8–3	I. Gardeck (1–1)	T. Nunez (1–2)	None	3,004	7–9	–
17	March 14	Samford	Sewell-Thomas Stadium	6–5	C. Otwell (1–0)	L. Rutledge (0–1)	None	3,071	8–9	–
18	March 16	#4 Arkansas	Baum Stadium	3–4^{12}	B. Astin (2–0)	J. Rosecrans (0–1)	None	8,530	8–10	0–1
19	March 17	#4 Arkansas	Baum Stadium	4–8	R. Stanek (5–0)	T. Guilbeau (1–2)	B. Moore (2)	9,615	8–11	0–2
20	March 18	#4 Arkansas	Baum Stadium	4–7	N. Sanburn (2–1)	T. Pilkington (0–2)	B. Astin (6)	8,426	8–12	0–3
21	March 20	Troy	Riddle–Pace Field	0–9	N. Hill (3–1)	C. Baxter (0–1)	None	2,936	8–13	–
22	March 23	#17 Ole Miss	Sewell-Thomas Stadium	7–11	D. Chavez (2–0)	I. Gardeck (1–2)	None	4,123	8–14	0–4
23	March 24	#17 Ole Miss	Sewell-Thomas Stadium	3–2	T. Guilbeau (2–2)	B. Huber (0–1)	None	4,249	9–14	1–4
24	March 25	#17 Ole Miss	Sewell-Thomas Stadium	4–8	D. Chavez (3–0)	S. Turnbull (0–2)	None	4,089	9–15	1–5
25	March 27	UAB	Regions Park	0–1^{12}	J. German (3–0)	N. Kennedy (0–1)	None	2,224	9–16	–
26	March 30	Tennessee	Lindsey Nelson Stadium	8–10	C. Watson (2–0)	J. Shaw (0–1)	N. Blount (4)	1,981	9–17	1–6
27	March 31	Tennessee	Lindsey Nelson Stadium	2–4	D. Steckenrider (3–0)	J. Kamplain (1–2)	N. Blount (5)	2,008	9–18	1–7

April (8–10)

#	Date	Opponent	Site/stadium	Score	Win	Loss	Save	Attendance	Overall record	SEC record
28	April 1	Tennessee	Lindsey Nelson Stadium	3–5	C. Watson (3–0)	J. Keller (0–1)	N. Blount (6)	2,424	9–19	1–8
29	April 3	South Alabama	Stanky Field	9–5	S. Turnbull (1–2)	J. Dennis (1–3)	None	2,359	10–19	–
30	April 6	#23 Auburn	Sewell-Thomas Stadium	10–6	T. Guilbeau (3–2)	D. Varnadore (1–4)	None	5,258	11–19	2–8
31	April 7	#23 Auburn	Sewell-Thomas Stadium	4–3	T. Pilkington (1–0)	S. Smith (2–4)	None	4,541	12–19	3–8
32	April 8	#23 Auburn	Sewell-Thomas Stadium	6–2	J. Keller (1–1)	D. Koger (2–2)	J. Hubbard (2)	3,074	13–19	4–8
33	April 10	UAB	Sewell-Thomas Stadium	1–9					13–20	–
34	April 11	SE Louisiana	Alumni Field	Cancelled						
35	April 13	#4 LSU	Alex Box Stadium	2–10					13–21	4–9
36	April 14	#4 LSU	Alex Box Stadium	1–7					13–22	4–10
37	April 15	#4 LSU	Alex Box Stadium	1–5					13–23	4–11
38	April 17	MS Valley St	Sewell-Thomas Stadium	8–0					14–23	–
39	April 18	MS Valley St.	Sewell-Thomas Stadium	3–8					14–24	–
40	April 20	Vanderbilt	Sewell-Thomas Stadium	6–4					15–24	5–11
41	April 21	Vanderbilt	Sewell-Thomas Stadium	8–6					16–24	6–11
42	April 22	Vanderbilt	Sewell-Thomas Stadium	7–9					16–25	6–12
43	April 24	Samford	Griffin Stadium	5–4					17–25	–
44	April 26	#7 South Carolina	Carolina Stadium	0–1					17–26	6–13
45	April 27	#7 South Carolina	Carolina Stadium	11–12					17–27	6–14
46	April 28	#7 South Carolina	Carolina Stadium	1–9					17–28	6–15

May (4–6)

#	Date	Opponent	Site/stadium	Score	Win	Loss	Save	Attendance	Overall record	SEC record
47	May 4	Mississippi State	Sewell-Thomas Stadium	1–3					17–29	6–16
48	May 5	Mississippi State	Sewell-Thomas Stadium	2–3					17–30	6–17
49	May 6	Mississippi State	Sewell-Thomas Stadium	8–7					18–30	7–17
50	May 11	Kentucky	Cliff Hagan Stadium	2–4					18–31	7–18
51	May 12	Kentucky	Cliff Hagan Stadium	6–7					18–32	7–19
52	May 13	Kentucky	Cliff Hagan Stadium	1–8					18–33	7–20
53	May 15	Troy	Sewell-Thomas Stadium	10–5					19–33	–
54	May 17	Georgia	Sewell-Thomas Stadium	4–8					19–34	7–21
55	May 18	Georgia	Sewell-Thomas Stadium	4–0					20–34	8–21
56	May 19	Georgia	Sewell-Thomas Stadium	6–4					21–34	9–21

† Indicates the game does not count toward the 2012 Southeastern Conference standings.
*Rankings are based on the team's current ranking in the Baseball America poll the week Alabama faced each opponent.

== Awards and honors ==
- Taylor Dugas

Perfect Game USA preseason All-American; 2nd team
Lowe's Senior CLASS Award candidate

- Justin Kamplain

SEC Freshman of the Week; March 26

- Ben Moore

SEC Freshman of the Week; February 27

== Alabama Crimson Tide in the 2012 MLB draft ==
The following members of the Alabama Crimson Tide baseball program were drafted in the 2012 MLB draft.

Player	Position	Round	Overall	Date Signed	MLB team
Taylor Dugas	OF	8th	227th	6/6/12	New York Yankees
Wade Wass†	C	13th	402nd	Unsigned	Baltimore Orioles
Ian Gardeck	RHP	16th	508th	6/12/12	San Francisco Giants
Jackson Stephens†	RHP	18th	562nd	6/19/12	Cincinnati Reds
Jared Reaves	SS	25th	783rd	6/13/12	Detroit Tigers
Ray Castillo†	RHP	27th	833rd	Unsigned	Cleveland Indians
Mikey White†	SS	34th	1040th	Unsigned	New York Mets

† Indicates the player 2012-13 baseball signee

== See also ==
- Alabama Crimson Tide baseball
- 2012 NCAA Division I baseball season
- 2012 Alabama Crimson Tide softball season
