= 2012 Florida Gators baseball team =

American college baseball season

2012 Florida Gators baseball

Gainesville Regional champions Gainesville Super Regional champions

College World Series, 0–2
- Conference: Southeastern Conference

Ranking
- Coaches: No. 6
- CB: No. 7
- Record: 47–20 (18–12 SEC)
- Head coach: Kevin O'Sullivan (5th year)
- Assistant coach: Craig Bell (5th year); Brad Weitzel (5th year)
- Home stadium: Alfred A. McKethan Stadium

2012 Southeastern Conference baseball standings
	Conf.				Overall
Team	W		L	PCT	W		L	PCT
Eastern
No. 2 South Carolina ^{x}‍‍‍^{y}	18	–	11	.621	49	–	20	.710
No. 6 Florida ‍‍‍^{y}	18	–	12	.600	47	–	20	.701
No. 19 Kentucky ‍‍‍^{y}	18	–	12	.600	45	–	18	.714
No. 25 Vanderbilt ‍‍‍^{y}	16	–	14	.533	35	–	28	.556
Georgia ‍‍‍	14	–	15	.483	31	–	26	.544
Tennessee ‍‍‍	8	–	22	.267	24	–	31	.436
Western
No. 11 LSU ^{x}‍†‍‍^{y}	19	–	11	.633	47	–	18	.723
No. 3 Arkansas ‍‍‍^{y}	16	–	14	.533	46	–	22	.676
Mississippi State ‍‍‡‍^{y}	16	–	14	.533	40	–	24	.625
Ole Miss ‍‍‍^{y}	14	–	16	.467	37	–	26	.587
Auburn ‍‍‍	13	–	17	.433	31	–	28	.525
Alabama ‍‍‍	9	–	21	.300	21	–	34	.382
x – Division champion † – Conference champion ‡ – Tournament champion y – Invited to the NCAA tournament As of June 26, 2012; Rankings from Coaches' Poll

The 2012 Florida Gators baseball team represented the University of Florida in the sport of baseball during the 2012 college baseball season. The Gators competed in Division I of the National Collegiate Athletic Association (NCAA) and the Eastern Division of the Southeastern Conference (SEC). They played their home games at Alfred A. McKethan Stadium, on the university's Gainesville, Florida campus. The team was coached by Kevin O'Sullivan, who was in his fifth season at Florida. The Gators sought to build upon their appearance in the 2011 College World Series Finals, where they were eliminated by South Carolina in two games.

After being eliminated in the semifinals of the SEC tournament, the Gators were selected as the No. 1 national seed in the NCAA tournament. After winning the Gainesville Regional and Super Regional, they advanced to the College World Series for the third consecutive year. There they were eliminated after just two games, losing to South Carolina and Kent State.

The Gators had nine players selected in the 2012 Major League Baseball draft including junior catcher Mike Zunino, recipient of the 2012 Dick Howser Trophy.

== Roster ==
2012 Florida Gators baseball team
Players
Coaches

#	Pos.	Name	B/T	Height	Weight	Year	Home town
23	RHP	Jonathon Crawford	R/L	6 ft 1 in (1.85 m)	205 lb (93 kg)	So	Okeechobee, FL
20	INF	Cody Dent	L/R	5 ft 11 in (1.8 m)	190 lb (86 kg)	Jr	Boynton Beach, FL
29	C	Mike Fahrman	R/R	6 ft 0 in (1.83 m)	190 lb (86 kg)	Fr	Tampa, FL
4	INF	Nolan Fontana	L/R	5 ft 11 in (1.8 m)	190 lb (86 kg)	Jr	Winter Garden, FL
6	LHP	Daniel Gibson	L/L	6 ft 3 in (1.91 m)	220 lb (100 kg)	So	Lutz, FL
17	C	Taylor Gushue	S/R	6 ft 2 in (1.88 m)	205 lb (93 kg)	Fr	Boca Raton, FL
24	RHP	Ryan Harris	R/R	6 ft 2 in (1.88 m)	200 lb (91 kg)	Fr	Jupiter, FL
31	C	Todd Haskel	R/R	5 ft 11 in (1.8 m)	185 lb (84 kg)	RS So	Palm Harbor, FL
35	LHP	Brian Johnson	L/L	6 ft 3 in (1.91 m)	235 lb (107 kg)	Jr	Cocoa Beach, FL
28	RHP	Keenan Kish	L/R	6 ft 3 in (1.91 m)	205 lb (93 kg)	So	Worcester, PA
37	RHP	Greg Larson	R/R	6 ft 8 in (2.03 m)	235 lb (107 kg)	Sr	Longwood, FL
10	RHP	Austin Maddox	R/R	6 ft 3 in (1.91 m)	235 lb (107 kg)	Jr	Jacksonville, FL
45	RHP	Johnny Magliozzi	R/R	5 ft 10 in (1.78 m)	195 lb (88 kg)	Fr	East Milton, MA
13	OF	Connor Mitchell	L/R	6 ft 0 in (1.83 m)	185 lb (84 kg)	RS Fr	Tampa, FL
41	INF	Jeff Moyer	L/R	5 ft 11 in (1.8 m)	190 lb (86 kg)	Sr	Winter Springs, FL
8	OF	Daniel Pigott	R/R	6 ft 2 in (1.88 m)	205 lb (93 kg)	Sr	Ormond Beach, FL
5	INF	Zack Powers	L/R	6 ft 3 in (1.91 m)	205 lb (93 kg)	So	Seffner, FL
14	LHP	Bobby Poyner	L/L	6 ft 0 in (1.83 m)	205 lb (93 kg)	Fr	Wellington, FL
30	INF	Vickash Ramjit	R/R	6 ft 3 in (1.91 m)	215 lb (98 kg)	Jr	Miami, FL
11	RHP	Hudson Randall	R/R	6 ft 3 in (1.91 m)	180 lb (82 kg)	Jr	Atlanta, GA
26	OF	Cory Reid	R/R	6 ft 2 in (1.88 m)	195 lb (88 kg)	Fr	Port St. Lucie, FL
27	RHP	Aaron Rhodes	L/R	5 ft 11 in (1.8 m)	190 lb (86 kg)	Fr	Venice, FL
32	LHP	Steven Rodriguez	L/L	6 ft 2 in (1.88 m)	235 lb (107 kg)	Jr	Miami, FL
15	C	Brandon Sedell	R/R	6 ft 1 in (1.85 m)	225 lb (102 kg)	Fr	Davie, FL
16	INF	Justin Shafer	R/R	6 ft 2 in (1.88 m)	200 lb (91 kg)	Fr	Lake Wales, FL
21	LHP	Corey Stump	L/L	6 ft 5 in (1.96 m)	220 lb (100 kg)	Fr	Lakeland, FL
18	OF	Tyler Thompson	L/R	6 ft 1 in (1.85 m)	190 lb (86 kg)	Sr	Tequesta, FL
12	INF	Josh Tobias	S/R	5 ft 9 in (1.75 m)	205 lb (93 kg)	Fr	Greensboro, NC
34	INF	Sean Trent	R/R	6 ft 1 in (1.85 m)	205 lb (93 kg)	Fr	Maitland, FL
25	INF	Preston Tucker	L/L	6 ft 0 in (1.83 m)	220 lb (100 kg)	Sr	Tampa, FL
2	INF	Casey Turgeon	L/R	5 ft 9 in (1.75 m)	165 lb (75 kg)	Fr	Palm Harbor, FL
22	RHP	Karsten Whitson	R/R	6 ft 4 in (1.93 m)	225 lb (102 kg)	So	Chipley, FL
3	C	Mike Zunino	R/R	6 ft 2 in (1.88 m)	220 lb (100 kg)	Jr	Cape Coral, FL

Head coach

7 Kevin O'Sullivan

Assistant coach(es)

33 Craig Bell
42 Brad Weitzel

Legend

- (C) Team captain
- (S) Suspended
- (I) Ineligible
- Injured
- Current redshirt

== Schedule ==
2012 Florida Gators baseball game log
Regular season
February

Date	Opponent	Rank	Stadium Site	Score	Win	Loss	Save	Attendance	Overall Record	SEC Record
February 17	No. 16 Cal State Fullerton	No. 1	McKethan Stadium	7–3	Rodriguez (1–0)	Cardona (0–1)	None	5,356	1–0	–
February 18	No. 16 Cal State Fullerton	No. 1	McKethan Stadium	5–2	Whitson (1–0)	Wiest (0–1)	Maddox (1)	4,951	2–0	–
February 19	No. 16 Cal State Fullerton	No. 1	McKethan Stadium	5–8	Gauna (1–0)	Crawford (0–1)	Lorenzen (1)	4,082	2–1	–
February 21	Bethune–Cookman	No. 1	McKethan Stadium	8–6	Maddox (1–0)	Hernandez (0–1)	None	2,616	3–1	–
February 22	UCF	No. 1	McKethan Stadium	8–0	Crawford (1–1)	Collins (0–1)	None	2,867	4–1	–
February 24	William & Mary	No. 1	McKethan Stadium	4–1	Randall (1–0)	Shain (0–1)	Maddox (2)	3,139	5–1	–
February 25	William & Mary	No. 1	McKethan Stadium	5–1	Johnson (1–0)	Wainman (1–1)	None	4,093	6–1	–
February 26	William & Mary	No. 1	McKethan Stadium	5–3^{6}	Rodriguez (2–0)	Inghram (0–2)	None	2,918	7–1	–

March

Date	Opponent	Rank	Stadium Site	Score	Win	Loss	Save	Attendance	Overall Record	SEC Record
March 2	at No. 8 Miami (FL); Rivalry	No. 2	Alex Rodriguez Park; Coral Gables, FL	7–5	Randall (2–0)	Erickson (2–1)	Maddox (3)	4,233	8–1	–
March 3	at No. 8 Miami (FL); Rivalry	No. 2	Alex Rodriguez Park	13–5	Larson (1–0)	Whaley (1–1)	None	4,999	9–1	–
March 4	at No. 8 Miami (FL); Rivalry	No. 2	Alex Rodriguez Park	8–5	Magliozzi (1–0)	Encinosa (0–1)	Gibson (1)	2,124	10–1	–
March 6	Florida Atlantic	No. 1	McKethan Stadium	16–1	Poyner (1–0)	Meiers (1–2)	None	2,803	11–1	–
March 7	Florida A&M	No. 1	McKethan Stadium	15–2	Larson (2–0)	Duncan (1–3)	None	2,673	12–1	–
March 9	Florida Gulf Coast	No. 1	McKethan Stadium	4–2	Rodriguez (3–0)	Anderson (1–1)	Maddox (4)	3,001	13–1	–
March 10	Florida Gulf Coast	No. 1	McKethan Stadium	8–3	Johnson (2–0)	Bixler (2–2)	None	3,413	14–1	–
March 11	Florida Gulf Coast	No. 1	McKethan Stadium	3–2	Gibson (1–0)	Forjet (0–2)	Maddox (5)	3,266	15–1	–
March 13	No. 6 Florida State; Rivalry	No. 1	McKethan Stadium	9–2	Larson (3–0)	Sitz (1–1)	Maddox (6)	6,005	16–1	–
March 14	Ontario Blue Jays (exh.)	No. 1	McKethan Stadium	Cancelled (rain); no make-up.						
March 16	Vanderbilt	No. 1	McKethan Stadium	10–2	Randall (3–0)	Ziomek (2–2)	None	4,141	17–1	1–0
March 17	Vanderbilt	No. 1	McKethan Stadium	5–1	Johnson (3–0)	VerHagen (2–2)	None	4,364	18–1	2–0
March 18	Vanderbilt	No. 1	McKethan Stadium	8–2	Crawford (2–1)	Beede (0–3)	None	4,088	19–1	3–0
March 20	Samford	No. 1	McKethan Stadium	5–3	Magliozzi (2–0)	Rutledge (0–2)	Maddox (7)	2,769	20–1	–
March 22	at No. 8 South Carolina	No. 1	Carolina Stadium; Columbia, SC	3–9	Price (3–1)	Rodriguez (3–1)	None	8,242	20–2	3–1
March 23	at No. 8 South Carolina	No. 1	Carolina Stadium	8–2	Johnson (4–0)	Koumas (1–2)	None	8,242	21–2	4–1
March 24	at No. 8 South Carolina	No. 1	Carolina Stadium	5–4	Maddox (2–0)	Price (3–2)	None	8,242	22–2	5–1
March 27	vs. No. 4 Florida State; Rivalry	No. 1	Baseball Grounds; Jacksonville, FL	4–1	Magliozzi (3–0)	Busch (0–1)	Maddox (8)	10,751	23–2	–
March 30	at No. 20 Ole Miss	No. 1	Swayze Field; Oxford, MS	0–3	Wahl (5–0)	Randall (3–1)	Huber (6)	9,311	23–3	5–2
March 31	at No. 20 Ole Miss	No. 1	Swayze Field	9–4	Magliozzi (4–0)	Chavez (3–1)	None	10,064	24–3	6–2

April

Date	Opponent	Rank	Stadium Site	Score	Win	Loss	Save	Attendance	Overall Record	SEC Record
April 1	at No. 20 Ole Miss	No. 1	Swayze Field	6–7	Huber (1–1)	Maddox (2–1)	None	8,616	24–4	6–3
April 3	at North Florida	No. 1	Harmon Stadium; Jacksonville, FL	5–10	Jagodzinski (1–0)	Poyner (1–1)	None	2,144	24–5	–
April 5	No. 12 LSU	No. 1	McKethan Stadium	6–7	McCune (2–3)	Johnson (4–1)	Goody (3)	4,487	24–6	6–4
April 6	No. 12 LSU	No. 1	McKethan Stadium	7–0	Crawford (3–1)	Gausman (5–1)	None	5,793	25–6	7–4
April 7	No. 12 LSU	No. 1	McKethan Stadium	7–8	Bonvillain (2–0)	Maddox (2–2)	Goody (4)	6,108	25–7	7–5
April 10	at No. 1 Florida State; Rivalry	No. 4	Dick Howser Stadium; Tallahassee, FL	6–3	Harris (1–0)	Bird (0–1)	Maddox (9)	6,730	26–7	–
April 13	at Tennessee	No. 4	Lindsey Nelson Stadium; Knoxville, TN	3–1	Crawford (4–1)	Godley (4–2)	Maddox (10)	3,401	27–7	8–5
April 14	at Tennessee	No. 4	Lindsey Nelson Stadium	4–5	Saberhagen (4–0)	Magliozzi (4–1)	Blount (9)	2,838	27–8	8–6
April 15	at Tennessee	No. 4	Lindsey Nelson Stadium	8–1	Johnson (5–1)	Williams (2–4)	None	3,322	28–8	9–6
April 17	Georgia Southern	No. 1	McKethan Stadium	8–2	Larson (4–0)	Hart (1–1)	None	3,002	29–8	–
April 20	Georgia	No. 1	McKethan Stadium	3–2^{16}	Larson (5–0)	Swinford (0–1)	None	4,840	30–8	10–6
April 21	Georgia	No. 1	McKethan Stadium	3–5	Palazzone (2–5)	Johnson (5–2)	Dieterich (7)	4,458	30–9	10–7
April 22	Georgia	No. 1	McKethan Stadium	6–3	Whitson (2–0)	Benzor (4–2)	Maddox (11)	4,492	31–9	11–7
April 24	South Florida	No. 2	McKethan Stadium	3–5	Barbosa (5–3)	Gibson (1–1)	Leasure (6)	2,897	31–10	–
April 25	Bethune–Cookman	No. 2	McKethan Stadium	10–1	Whitson (3–0)	Durapau (2–5)	None	2,563	32–10	–
April 27	No. 17 Arkansas	No. 2	McKethan Stadium	3–2	Randall (4–1)	Stanek (6–3)	Maddox (12)	3,906	33–10	12–7
April 28	No. 17 Arkansas	No. 2	McKethan Stadium	1–5	Moore (4–1)	Johnson (5–3)	None	4,894	33–11	12–8
April 29	No. 17 Arkansas	No. 2	McKethan Stadium	1–3^{10}	Suggs (4–0)	Magliozzi (4–2)	Astin (7)	3,927	33–12	12–9

May

Date	Opponent	Rank	Stadium Site	Score	Win	Loss	Save	Attendance	Overall Record	SEC Record
May 3	at No. 6 Kentucky	No. 5	Cliff Hagan Stadium; Lexington, KY	5–3	Randall (5–1)	Rogers (5–3)	Rodriguez (1)	2,457	34–12	13–9
May 4	at No. 6 Kentucky	No. 5	Cliff Hagan Stadium	5–1	Larson (6–0)	Grundy (4–2)	Rodriguez (2)	2,925	35–12	14–9
May 5	at No. 6 Kentucky	No. 5	Cliff Hagan Stadium	1–2	Littrell (7–0)	Johnson (5–4)	Gott (9)	2,607	35–13	14–10
May 8	North Florida	No. 5	McKethan Stadium	4–3^{11}	Harris (2–0)	Karmeris (0–2)	None	2,714	36–13	–
May 11	Mississippi State	No. 5	McKethan Stadium	4–1	Randall (6–1)	Stratton (9–1)	Rodriguez (3)	3,875	37–13	15–10
May 12	Mississippi State	No. 5	McKethan Stadium	0–2	Graveman (4–3)	Crawford (4–2)	Holder (4)	4,593	37–14	15–11
May 13	Mississippi State	No. 5	McKethan Stadium	2–1	Maddox (3–2)	Lindgren (1–2)	None	3,299	38–14	16–11
May 15	at Samford	No. 3	Joe Lee Griffin Stadium; Birmingham, AL	7–12	Irby (4–1)	Magliozzi (4–3)	None	1,722	38–15	–
May 17	at Auburn	No. 3	Plainsman Park; Auburn, AL	6–0	Randall (7–1)	Jacobs (5–3)	None	2,652	39–15	17–11
May 18	at Auburn	No. 3	Plainsman Park	10–1	Johnson (6–4)	Koger (3–5)	None	3,511	40–15	18–11
May 19	at Auburn	No. 3	Plainsman Park	4–5	Varnadore (4–7)	Rodriguez (3–2)	Bryant (6)	2,983	40–16	18–12

Postseason
SEC Tournament

Date	Opponent	Rank	Stadium Site	Score	Win	Loss	Save	Attendance	Overall Record	SECT Record
May 22	vs. (10) Auburn	No. 2 (3)	Regions Park; Hoover, AL	6–1	Crawford (5–2)	Jacobs (5–4)	None	7,145	41–16	1–0
May 24	vs. (5) Vanderbilt	No. 2 (3)	Regions Park	1–2	Selman (9–3)	Randall (7–2)	Miller (1)	6,672	41–17	1–1
May 25	vs. No. 4 (2) South Carolina	No. 2 (3)	Regions Park	7–2	Johnson (7–4)	Holmes (6–1)	None	9,067	42–17	2–1
May 26	vs. (5) Vanderbilt	No. 2 (3)	Regions Park	6–8	Clinard (7–2)	Maddox (3–3)	VerHagen (2)	9,243	42–18	2–2

NCAA tournament: Gainesville Regional

Date	Opponent	Rank	Stadium Site	Score	Win	Loss	Save	Attendance	Overall Record	Regional Record
June 1	Bethune–Cookman	No. 1	McKethan Stadium	4–0	Crawford (6–2)	Gonzalez (9–2)	None	3,285	43–18	1–0
June 2	No. 24 Georgia Tech	No. 1	McKethan Stadium	6–2	Randall (8–2)	Farmer (8–4)	Rodriguez (4)	4,584	44–18	2–0
June 3	No. 24 Georgia Tech	No. 1	McKethan Stadium	15–3	Johnson (8–4)	Davies (1–4)	None	3,537	45–18	3–0

NCAA tournament: Gainesville Super Regional

Date	Opponent	Rank	Stadium Site	Score	Win	Loss	Save	Attendance	Overall Record	Super Reg. Record
June 9	No. 16 NC State	No. 1	McKethan Stadium	7–1	Randall (9–2)	Ogburn (5–4)	None	5,117	46–18	1–0
June 10	No. 16 NC State	No. 1	McKethan Stadium	9–8^{10}	Whitson (4–0)	Williams (4–4)	Kish (1)	4,568	47–18	2–0

College World Series

Date	Opponent	Rank	Stadium Site	Score	Win	Loss	Save	Attendance	Overall Record	CWS Record
June 16	vs. No. 6 South Carolina	No. 1	TD Ameritrade Park; Omaha, NE	3–7	Roth (8–1)	Johnson (8–5)	Price (12)	25,291	47–19	0–1
June 18	vs. Kent State	No. 1	TD Ameritrade Park	4–5	Bores (10–3)	Randall (9–3)	Pierce (3)	15,000	47–20	0–2

Rankings from USA Today/ESPN Top 25 coaches' baseball poll. All times Eastern. Parenthesis indicate tournament seedings. Retrieved from FloridaGators.com

== Rankings ==
Ranking movements Legend: ██ Increase in ranking ██ Decrease in ranking
	Week																
Poll	Pre	1	2	3	4	5	6	7	8	9	10	11	12	13	14	15	Final
Coaches'	1	1*	2	1	1	1	1	1	4	1	2	5	5	3	2	1	6
Baseball America	1	1	1	1	1	1	1	1	7	5	5	7	6	3	3	1	3
Collegiate Baseball^	1	1	1	1	1	1	1	2	4	4	4	8	5	5	4	3	7
NCBWA†	1	1	1	1	1	1	1	1	4	1	2	5	5	2	2	1	6

^ Collegiate Baseball ranked 40 teams in their preseason poll, but only ranked 30 teams weekly during the season.
† NCBWA ranks 30 teams in their preseason poll, but only ranks 25 teams weekly during the season.
* A new poll was not released for this week, so for comparison purposes, the previous week's ranking is inserted in this week's slot.

== Awards and honors ==
Jonathon Crawford

- Pitched a no-hitter on June 2, 2012, against Bethune–Cookman in the opening round of the Gainesville Regional tournament. It was the first Gators solo no-hitter since 1991 and the seventh no-hitter in NCAA tournament history.

Nolan Fontana

- Second-team All-SEC
- SEC All-Defensive team

Taylor Gushue

- SEC Freshman of the Week (2/13/12–2/20/12). On Feb. 17, Gushue homered on the first pitch he saw as a collegian and on Feb. 18 hit a two-run triple in the fourth inning of a series-clinching win over Cal State Fullerton.
- SEC Freshman of the Week (2/27/12–3/5/12). Gushue hit .400 (4-for-10), with four RBI, three runs and a pair of homers during a three-game sweep at #8 Miami.

Brian Johnson

- SEC Player of the Week (4/9/12–4/16/12). Johnson batted .471 (8-for-17) with a team-high seven RBI during four games, including a victory at #1 Florida State and a series win at Tennessee.
- First-team All-SEC
- John Olerud Award – (two-way player)

Steven Rodriguez

- First-team All-SEC

Josh Tobias

- SEC All-Freshman team

Preston Tucker

- SEC Player of the Week (3/12/12–3/19/12). Tucker batted .400 (6-for-15) in four victories including a three-game-sweep of Vanderbilt.
- First-team All-SEC

Casey Turgeon

- SEC Player of the Week (5/1/12–5/8/12). Turgeon batted .400 (4-for-10) and scored a game-winning run during a series win at #6 Kentucky.

Mike Zunino

- College Baseball 360 Primetime Player Of The Week (2/28/12–3/6/12). Zunino batted .400 (6-for-15) with five runs, four RBI, three doubles and a home-run during a three-game sweep at #8 Miami.
- Louisville Slugger National Player of the Week (3/5/12–3/12/12). Zunino batted .389 (7-for-18) with five runs, 11 RBI, four home-runs and a slugging percentage of 1.111 during five wins.
- First-team All-SEC
- SEC All-Defensive team
- 2012 Dick Howser Trophy (College Baseball Player of the Year) recipient.

== Gators in the MLB draft ==
Round	Selection	Player	Position	Team
1	3	Mike Zunino	C	Seattle Mariners
1	31	Brian Johnson	LHP/1B	Boston Red Sox
2	61	Nolan Fontana	SS	Houston Astros
2	82	Steven Rodriguez	LHP	Los Angeles Dodgers
3	118	Austin Maddox	RHP	Boston Red Sox
7	219	Preston Tucker	OF	Houston Astros
7	244	Hudson Randall	RHP	Detroit Tigers
9	292	Daniel Pigott	OF	Cincinnati Reds
20	631	Greg Larson	RHP	Boston Red Sox

== See also ==
- Florida Gators
- List of Florida Gators baseball players
