= 2012 Kentucky Wildcats baseball team =

2012 season of University of Kentucky baseball team

2012 Kentucky Wildcats baseball
- Conference: Southeastern Conference

Ranking
- Coaches: No. 19
- CB: No. 21
- Record: 45–18 (18–12 SEC)
- Head coach: Gary Henderson (4th season)
- Assistant coaches: Brian Green (4th season); Brad Bohannon (8th season); Keith Vorhoff (5th season)
- Pitching coach: Gary Henderson
- Home stadium: Cliff Hagan Stadium

2012 Southeastern Conference baseball standings
	Conf.				Overall
Team	W		L	PCT	W		L	PCT
Eastern
No. 2 South Carolina ^{x}‍‍‍^{y}	18	–	11	.621	49	–	20	.710
No. 6 Florida ‍‍‍^{y}	18	–	12	.600	47	–	20	.701
No. 19 Kentucky ‍‍‍^{y}	18	–	12	.600	45	–	18	.714
No. 25 Vanderbilt ‍‍‍^{y}	16	–	14	.533	35	–	28	.556
Georgia ‍‍‍	14	–	15	.483	31	–	26	.544
Tennessee ‍‍‍	8	–	22	.267	24	–	31	.436
Western
No. 11 LSU ^{x}‍†‍‍^{y}	19	–	11	.633	47	–	18	.723
No. 3 Arkansas ‍‍‍^{y}	16	–	14	.533	46	–	22	.676
Mississippi State ‍‍‡‍^{y}	16	–	14	.533	40	–	24	.625
Ole Miss ‍‍‍^{y}	14	–	16	.467	37	–	26	.587
Auburn ‍‍‍	13	–	17	.433	31	–	28	.525
Alabama ‍‍‍	9	–	21	.300	21	–	34	.382
x – Division champion † – Conference champion ‡ – Tournament champion y – Invited to the NCAA tournament As of June 26, 2012; Rankings from Coaches' Poll

The 2012 Kentucky Wildcats baseball team represented the University of Kentucky in the 2012 NCAA Division I baseball season. The Wildcats played their home games in Cliff Hagan Stadium. The team was coached by Gary Henderson, who was in his fourth season at Kentucky.

== Personnel ==
=== Roster ===
2012 Kentucky Wildcats baseball team
Players
Coaches

#	Pos.	Name	B/T	Height	Weight	Year	Previous school	Home town
2	OF	Zac Zellers	R/R	6 ft 0 in (1.83 m)	185 lb (84 kg)	Jr	Rockwood Summit	St. Louis, MO
3	INF	Andrew Bryant	R/R	5 ft 9 in (1.75 m)	170 lb (77 kg)	Fr	Tates Creek	Lexington, KY
4	INF	Paul McConkey	L/R	5 ft 11 in (1.8 m)	185 lb (84 kg)	So	Halls	Knoxville, TN
5	RHP	Trevor Gott	R/R	6 ft 0 in (1.83 m)	190 lb (86 kg)	Fr	Tates Creek	Lexington, KY
6	INF	Matt Reida	L/R	5 ft 11 in (1.8 m)	178 lb (81 kg)	So	Western	Russiaville, IN
7	OF	Lucas Witt	R/R	6 ft 1 in (1.85 m)	190 lb (86 kg)	So	Lexington Christian	Lexington, KY
8	RHP	Walter Wijas	R/R	6 ft 2 in (1.88 m)	215 lb (98 kg)	Jr	James B. Conant	Elk Grove Village, IL
9	INF	Max Kuhn	R/R	5 ft 11 in (1.8 m)	198 lb (90 kg)	Fr	Zionsville	Zionsville, IN
11	OF	Cameron Flynn	L/R	6 ft 0 in (1.83 m)	195 lb (88 kg)	RS Jr	Henry Clay/Morehead State	Lexington, KY
12	LHP	Corey Littrell	L/L	6 ft 3 in (1.91 m)	190 lb (86 kg)	So	Trinity	Louisville, KY
14	RHP	Chandler Shepherd	R/R	6 ft 2 in (1.88 m)	185 lb (84 kg)	Fr	Lawrence County	Louisa, KY
15	OF	Jeff Boehm	L/L	6 ft 1 in (1.85 m)	205 lb (93 kg)	Fr	Mount Carmel	Lansing, IL
16	OF	Brian Adams	R/R	6 ft 4 in (1.93 m)	220 lb (100 kg)	Jr	South Forsyth	Gainesville, GA
17	RHP	Taylor Martin	R/R	6 ft 4 in (1.93 m)	195 lb (88 kg)	So	Lexington Catholic	Lexington, KY
18	LHP	A.J. Reed	L/L	6 ft 4 in (1.93 m)	235 lb (107 kg)	Fr	Terre Haute South	Terre Haute, IN
19	OF	Austin Cousino	L/L	5 ft 10 in (1.78 m)	178 lb (81 kg)	Fr	Dublin Coffman	Dublin, OH
21	C	Luke Maile	R/R	6 ft 3 in (1.91 m)	220 lb (100 kg)	Jr	Covington Catholic	Crestview Hills, KY
22	LHP	Jerad Grundy	L/L	6 ft 1 in (1.85 m)	200 lb (91 kg)	Jr	Johnsburg	Johnsburg, IL
23	RHP	Tim Peterson	R/R	6 ft 2 in (1.88 m)	195 lb (88 kg)	Jr	Emerald Ridge	Puyallup, WA
24	RHP	Spencer Drake	R/R	6 ft 3 in (1.91 m)	190 lb (86 kg)	Fr	Eastern	Louisville, KY
25	INF	Thomas McCarthy	R/R	6 ft 2 in (1.88 m)	200 lb (91 kg)	Sr	Crescent Valley/Western Oregon	Corvallis, OR
26	INF	Cole Evans	R/R	6 ft 1 in (1.85 m)	220 lb (100 kg)	Fr	St. George	Memphis, TN
27	OF	Damon Saunders	R/R	5 ft 10 in (1.78 m)	180 lb (82 kg)	RS Fr	Butler	Louisville, KY
28	RHP	Chris Garrison	R/R	6 ft 4 in (1.93 m)	200 lb (91 kg)	Jr	Rocklin/Oregon	Rockli, CA
29	RHP	Zach Strecker	R/R	6 ft 4 in (1.93 m)	200 lb (91 kg)	Fr	Eastern	Louisville, KY
30	LHP	Sam Mahar	R/R	6 ft 1 in (1.85 m)	195 lb (88 kg)	Fr	Tremper	Kenosha, WI
34	LHP	Taylor Rogers	L/L	6 ft 3 in (1.91 m)	175 lb (79 kg)	Jr	Chatfield	Littleton, CO
35	C	Michael Williams	R/R	6 ft 2 in (1.88 m)	220 lb (100 kg)	Sr	Farragut	Knoxville, TN
37	C	Steven Hoagland	R/R	5 ft 8 in (1.73 m)	155 lb (70 kg)	RS Fr	Lexington Christian	Lexington, KY
39	RHP	Tyler Dunaway	R/R	6 ft 1 in (1.85 m)	205 lb (93 kg)	RS So	Eastern	Louisville, KY
40	C	Greg Fettes	R/R	6 ft 2 in (1.88 m)	220 lb (100 kg)	Fr	Lamphere	Madison Heights, MI
42	C	Michael Thomas	R/R	5 ft 11 in (1.8 m)	210 lb (95 kg)	RS So	Elizabethtown	Elizabethtown, KY
44	LHP	Alex Phillips	L/L	6 ft 4 in (1.93 m)	205 lb (93 kg)	Sr	Tenino	Tenino, WA
46	INF	Thomas Bernal	R/R	6 ft 0 in (1.83 m)	210 lb (95 kg)	RS Fr	Paso Robles	Paso Robles, CA
47	INF	Tyler Raymond	L/L	6 ft 2 in (1.88 m)	200 lb (91 kg)	RS Fr	Grove City	Grove City, OH

Head coach

Gary Henderson

Assistant coach(es)

Brad Bohannon
Brian Green
Keith Vorhoff

Legend

- (C) Team captain
- (S) Suspended
- (I) Ineligible
- Injured
- Current redshirt

Roster
Last update: March 12, 2012

== Schedule ==
2012 Kentucky Wildcats baseball game log
Regular season (41–15)
February (8–0)

#	Date	Opponent	Site/stadium	Score	Win	Loss	Save	Attendance	Overall record	SEC record
1	February 17	@Wofford	Russell C. King Field	10–4	Rogers (1–0)	Collins (0–1)	none	491	1–0	–
2	February 18	Eastern Michigan	Russell C. King Field	10–2	Grundy (1–0)	Battistelli (0–1)	none	257	2–0	–
3	February 20	USC Upstate	Russell C. King Field	6–0	Littrell (1–0)	Lee (0–1)	none	256	3–0	–
4	February 24	Buffalo	Cliff Hagan Stadium	13–4	Rogers (2–0)	Copping (0–1)	none	1,261	4–0	–
5	February 25	Buffalo	Cliff Hagan Stadium	9–5	Wijas (1–0)	Paige (0–1)	none	1,212	5–0	–
6	February 26	Buffalo	Cliff Hagan Stadium	7–6	Gott (1–0)	Crumb (0–1)	none	1,353	6–0	–
7	February 28	Morehead State	Cliff Hagan Stadium	3–2	Reed (1–0)	Robertson (0–1)	Gott (1)	1,625	7–0	–
8	February 29	Xavier	Cliff Hagan Stadium	9–2	Shepherd (1–0)	Westrick (0–1)	none	1,317	8–0	–

March (18–2)

#	Date	Opponent	Site/stadium	Score	Win	Loss	Save	Attendance	Overall record	SEC record
9	March 3	Illinois-Chicago	Cliff Hagan Stadium	4–3	Rogers (3–0)	Evak (1–1)	Gott (2)	N/A	9–0	–
10	March 3	Illinois-Chicago	Cliff Hagan Stadium	8–2	Grundy (2–0)	Begel (0–3)	none	1,430	10–0	–
11	March 4	Illinois-Chicago	Cliff Hagan Stadium	20–0	Littrell (2–0)	Salemi (0–1)	none	1,212	11–0	–
12	March 6	Tennessee Tech	Cliff Hagan Stadium	10–6	Peterson (1–0)	McWirter (0–3)	none	1,340	12–0	–
13	March 7	Marshall	Cliff Hagan Stadium	7–3	Reed (2–0)	Stanley (0–1)	none	1,408	13–0	–
14	March 9	Canisius	Cliff Hagan Stadium	19–9	Rogers (4–0)	Martin (1–1)	none	1,223	14–0	–
15	March 10	Canisius	Cliff Hagan Stadium	7–5	Grundy (3–0)	Cortright (2–2)	none	1,288	15–0	–
16	March 11	Canisius	Cliff Hagan Stadium	5–4	Phillips (1–0)	Linseman (3–1)	none	1,277	16–0	–
17	March 13	Wright State	Cliff Hagan Stadium	9–1	Reed (3–0)	Hoelzel (1–3)	none	1,280	17–0	–
18	March 14	Murray State	Cliff Hagan Stadium	2–1	Phillips (2–0)	Babin (1–1)	Gott (3)	1,362	18–0	–
19	March 16	South Carolina	Cliff Hagan Stadium	4–3	Peterson (2–0)	Beal (1–1)	none	2,032	19–0	1–0
20	March 17	South Carolina	Cliff Hagan Stadium	4–3	Reed (4–0)	Price (2–1)	Gott (4)	1,950	20–0	2–0
21	March 18	South Carolina	Cliff Hagan Stadium	6–3	Wijas (2–0)	Belcher (1–1)	Gott (5)	2,571	21–0	3–0
22	March 21	@Cincinnati	Marge Schott Stadium	10–7	Shepherd (2–0)	Walker (1–1)	Phillips (1)	–	22–0	3–0
23	March 23	@Tennessee	Lindsey Nelson Stadium	1–4	Godley (4–1)	Rogers (4–1)	Blount (1)	1,516	22–1	3–1
24	March 24	@Tennessee	Lindsey Nelson Stadium	6–2	Phillips (3–0)	Zajac (0–1)	none	2,322	23–1	4–1
25	March 25	@Tennessee	Lindsey Nelson Stadium	6–0	Littrell (3–0)	Steckenrider (1–2)	none	2,154	24–1	5–1
26	March 27	WKU	Cliff Hagan Stadium	7–4	Mahar (1–0)	Clay (3–3)	none	2,385	25–1	5–1
27	March 30	@Georgia	Foley Field	6–7	Benzor (4–1)	Mahar (1–1)	Dietrich (5)	–	25–2	5–2
28	March 31	@Georgia	Foley Field	9–8	Phillips (4–0)	Crumley (1–2)	Gott (6)	3,100	26–2	6–2

April (10–7)

#	Date	Opponent	Site/stadium	Score	Win	Loss	Save	Attendance	Overall record	SEC record
29	April 1	@Georgia	Foley Field	11–2	Littrell (4–0)	Palazzone (0–3)	none	3,020	27–2	7–2
30	April 4	Dayton	Cliff Hagan Stadium	19–6	Mahar (2–1)	Konrad (3–2)	none	1,250	28–2	7–2
31	April 6	Ole Miss	Cliff Hagan Stadium	3–2	Phillips (5–1)	Chavez (3–2)	Gott (7)	2,428	29–2	8–2
32	April 7	Ole Miss	Cliff Hagan Stadium	3–9	Mayers (3–2)	Grundy (3–1)	none	2,507	29–3	8–3
33	April 8	Ole Miss	Cliff Hagan Stadium	8–3	Littrell (5–0)	Hively (3–2)	Phillips (2)	1,834	30–3	9–3
34	April 10	Louisville	Cliff Hagan Stadium	0–12	Ruxer (5–0)	Reed (4–1)	none	3,563	30–4	9–3
35	April 13	@Arkansas	Baum Stadium	7–8	Lynch (1–1)	Phillips (5–1)	none	6,825	30–5	9–4
36	April 15	@Arkansas	Baum Stadium	5–4	Shepherd (3–0)	Astin (2–3)	Peterson (1)	9,575	31–5	10–4
37	April 15	@Arkansas	Baum Stadium	2–1	Littrell (6–0)	Baxendale (6–2)	Gott (8)	9,575	32–5	11–4
38	April 17	Cincinnati	Cliff Hagan Stadium	7–0	Mahar (3–1)	Mergen (0–3)	none	1,530	33–5	11–4
39	April 20	LSU	Cliff Hagan Stadium	4–5	Gausman (7–1)	Rogers (4–2)	Goody (6)	3,785	33–6	11–5
40	April 21	LSU	Cliff Hagan Stadium	8–1	Grundy (4–1)	Eades (5–2)	Phillips (3)	2,625	34–6	12–5
41	April 22	LSU	Cliff Hagan Stadium	7–6	Peterson (3–0)	Bourgeois (1–2)	Phillips (4)	3,086	35–6	13–5
42	April 24	@Louisville	Jim Patterson Stadium	2–10	Green (3–0)	Mahar (3–2)	none	3,862	35–7	13–5
43	April 27	@Vanderbilt	Hawkins Field	5–2	Rogers (5–2)	Pecoraro (0–2)	none	2,584	36–7	14–5
44	April 28	@Vanderbilt	Hawkins Field	3–4	Clinard (5–2)	Mahar (3–3)	VerHagen (1)	2,837	36–8	14–6
45	April 29	@Vanderbilt	Hawkins Field	1–6	Selman (6–3)	Phillips (5–2)	none	2,885	36–9	14–7

May (5–6)

#	Date	Opponent	Site/stadium	Score	Win	Loss	Save	Attendance	Overall record	SEC record
46	May 3	Florida	Cliff Hagan Stadium	3–5	Randall (5–1)	Rogers (5–3)	Rodriguez (1)	2,457	36–10	14–8
47	May 4	Florida	Cliff Hagan Stadium	1–5	Larson (6–0)	Grundy (4–2)	Rodriguez (2)	2,925	36–11	14–9
48	May 5	Florida	Cliff Hagan Stadium	2–1	Littrell (7–0)	Johnson (5–4)	Gott (9)	2,607	37–11	15–9
49	May 9	@Indiana	Sembower Field	6–5^{12}	Gott (2–0)	Korte (0–4)	Mahar (1)	1,462	38–11	15–9
50	May 11	Alabama	Cliff Hagan Stadium	4–2	Rogers (6–3)	Turnbull (2–5)	Phillips (6)	2,456	39–11	16–9
51	May 12	Alabama	Cliff Hagan Stadium	7–6	Gott (3–0)	Rosecrans (0–2)	none	2,399	40–11	17–9
52	May 12	Alabama	Cliff Hagan Stadium	8–1	Littrell (8–0)	Sullivan (2–3)	Mahar (2)	2,399	41–11	18–9
53	May 15	@Murray State	Reagan Field	3–7	Handlin (5–3)	Reed (4–2)	none	1,379	41–12	18–9
54	May 17	@Mississippi State	Dudy Noble Field	1–3	Stratton (10–1)	Rogers (6–4)	Holder (5)	6,146	41–13	18–10
55	May 18	@Mississippi State	Dudy Noble Field	3–4	Pollorena (4–0)	Grundy (4–3)	Holder (6)	6,478	41–14	18–11
56	May 19	@Mississippi State	Dudy Noble Field	3–11	Lindgren (2–2)	Littrell (8–1)	none	6,395	41–15	18–12

Postseason (4–3)
SEC Tournament (2–1)

#	Date	Opponent	Site/stadium	Score	Win	Loss	Save	Attendance	Overall record	SECT record
57	May 22	Ole Miss	Regions Park	2–0	Reed (5–2)	Wahl (6–3)	Rogers (1)		42–15	1–0
58	May 24	Mississippi State	Regions Park	5–1	Grundy (5–3)	Graveman (4–4)	Phillips (7)	6,798	43–15	2–0
59	May 26	Mississippi State	Regions Park	1–2	Routt (3–5)	Littrell (8–2)	Holder (9)		43–16	2–1

NCAA tournament: Gary Regional (2–2)

#	Date	Opponent	Site/stadium	Score	Win	Loss	Save	Attendance	Overall record	NCAAT record
60	June 1	Kent State	U.S. Steel Yard	6–7^{21}	Clark (5–0)	Reed (5–3)	none		43–17	0–1
61	June 2	Valparaiso	U.S. Steel Yard	8–1	Grundy (6–3)	Wild (6–4)	Shepard (1)	677	44–17	1–1
62	June 3	Purdue	U.S. Steel Yard	6–3	Littrell (9–2)	Ramer (6–1)	Phillips (8)		45–17	2–1
63	June 3	Kent State	U.S. Steel Yard	2–3	Skulina (11–2)	Shepard (3–1)	Wilson (7)	761	45–18	2–2

2012 Kentucky Wildcats Baseball Schedule

== See also ==
- Kentucky Wildcats baseball
