= Raph Rhymes =

American baseball player (born 1989)

Free agent
- Outfielder
- Born: October 22, 1989 (age 36); Monroe, Louisiana, U.S.
- Bats: Right Throws: Right
- Stats at Baseball Reference

Raphael Ray Rhymes (born October 22, 1989) is a professional baseball outfielder. He played for the LSU Tigers baseball team.

== College career ==
After graduating Neville High School in Monroe, Louisiana, Rhymes attempted to walk onto the team at LSU but failed to make the team. Rhymes transferred to LSU-Eunice, where he led the Bengals to the NJCAA Division II World Series championship and earned NJCAA Division II Player of the Year honors.

Rhymes then transferred back to LSU and immediately became the Tigers primary designated hitter and hit .360 while starting all 56 games in 2011. Rhymes was drafted by the Pittsburgh Pirates in the 40th round of the 2011 Major League Baseball draft but elected to return to LSU.

Rhymes had a breakout season as a junior, leading college baseball in hitting and setting an LSU record for batting average with an average of .431. Rhymes was named the 2012 Southeastern Conference Baseball Player of the Year and earned First Team All-American honors. After the 2012 season, he played collegiate summer baseball with the Cotuit Kettleers of the Cape Cod Baseball League. Rhymes was drafted by the New York Yankees in the 30th round of the 2012 Major League Baseball draft but elected to return to LSU.

== Professional career ==
Rhymes was drafted by the Detroit Tigers in the 15th round of the 2013 Major League Baseball draft. He made his professional debut with the Connecticut Tigers. He played for the West Michigan White Caps in 2014 and Lakeland Flying Tigers in 2015. Rhymes was released by the Tigers in March 2016.
