= 2012 Texas Tech Red Raiders baseball team =

American college baseball season

2012 Texas Tech Red Raiders baseball
- Conference: Big 12 Conference
- Record: 29–26 (7–17 Big 12)
- Head coach: Dan Spencer (4th season)
- Assistant coaches: Tim Tadlock (1st season); Andy Jarvis (5th season)
- Hitting coach: Jim Horner (2nd season)
- Home stadium: Dan Law Field at Rip Griffin Park

2012 Big 12 Conference baseball standings
	Conf.				Overall
Team	W		L	PCT	W		L	PCT
No. 10 Baylor ‍†‍‍^{y}	20	–	4	.833	49	–	17	.742
No. 19 Texas A&M ‍‍‍^{y}	16	–	8	.667	43	–	18	.705
Texas ‍‍‍	14	–	10	.583	30	–	22	.577
No. 13 Oklahoma ‍‍‍^{y}	13	–	10	.565	42	–	25	.627
Oklahoma State ‍‍‍	13	–	11	.542	32	–	25	.561
Missouri ‍‍‡‍^{y}	10	–	14	.417	33	–	28	.541
Kansas ‍‍‍	7	–	16	.304	24	–	34	.414
Kansas State ‍‍‍	7	–	17	.292	27	–	31	.466
Texas Tech ‍‍‍	7	–	17	.292	29	–	26	.527
† – Conference champion ‡ – Tournament champion y – Invited to the NCAA tournament Rankings from Collegiate Baseball

The 2012 Texas Tech Red Raiders baseball team represented Texas Tech University during the 2012 NCAA Division I baseball season in the United States of America. The Red Raiders played their home games at Dan Law Field at Rip Griffin Park as a member of the Big 12 Conference. The team was led by Dan Spencer in his fourth and final season as the team's head coach.

The team finished with an overall record of 29–26, but went 7–17 in conference play, winning only one series in Big 12 play. Spencer was fired following the season, finishing his tenure at Texas Tech with an overall record of 115–112 and a Big 12 record of 44–61. Associate head coach Tim Tadlock would be promoted to head coach.

== Previous season ==
The 2011 team finished with an overall record of 33–25. The team went 12–15 in Big 12 play, finishing in 7th place. The Red Raiders were invited to the Big 12 Tournament. Texas Tech lost game one 5–10 to Texas A&M and were eliminated by Oklahoma, 1–3, in game two.

== Personnel ==
=== Coaching staff ===
Name	Position	Seasons at Texas Tech	Alma mater
Dan Spencer	Head coach	4	Portland State University (1990)
Tim Tadlock	Associate head coach / Recruiting coordinator	1	Texas Tech University (1992)
Jim Horner	Assistant coach / Hitting coach	2	Washington State University (1996)
Andy Jarvis	Volunteer assistant coach	5	Oregon State University (2003)

=== Roster ===
2012 Texas Tech Red Raiders Baseball Roster
Pitchers: 10 David Paiz (RHP) – sophomore (6'3); 15 Duke Schamann (RHP) – (redshirt) sophomore (6'4); 16 Trey Masek (RHP) – sophomore (6'0); 20 Jamen Parten (RHP) – junior (6'2); 25 Andre Wheeler (LHP) – sophomore (6'1); 26 Jerad McCrummen (RHP) – junior (6'1); 28 Ben Flora (LHP) – senior (5'11); 29 Scott Erzinger (LHP) – (redshirt) junior (6'3); 30 Aaron Corwin (RHP) – junior (5'11); 31 Ryan Bielitz (LHP) – freshman (6'2); 32 Shane Broyles (RHP) – junior (6'1); 35 Daniel Coulombe (LHP) – (redshirt) junior (5'11); 40 Blake Stewart (RHP) – junior (6'4); 42 John Neely (RHP) – senior (6'2); 44 Rusty Shellhorn (LHP) – (redshirt) junior (5'10); 49 Brannon Easterling (RHP) – (redshirt) sophomore (6'5); 50 Brennan Stewart (RHP) – (redshirt) senior (6'1)	Catchers: 5 Bo Altobelli – junior (6'1); 7 Kevin Whitehead – senior (6'2); 18 Mason Randolph – sophomore (6'1); Infielders: 1 Tim Proudfoot – freshman (5'10); 2 Jamodrick McGruder – junior (5'7); 3 Scott Lejeune – (redshirt) junior (6'0); 4 Matt Eureste – freshman (6'0); 5 Bo Altobelli – junior (6'1); 6 Reid Redman – senior (6'1); 9 Bryant Burleson – freshman (5'8); 12 Stephen Hagen – (redshirt) senior (6'2); 36 Blake Bass – freshman (6'6); Outfielders: 2 Jamodrick McGruder – junior (5'7); 8 Barrett Barnes – junior (6'1); 11 Nick Hanslik – (redshirt) junior (6'2); 14 Zach Reding – freshman (6'1); 17 Jordan Lopez – (redshirt) freshman (6'0); 21 Brennan Moore – junior (5'11); 25 Andre Wheeler – sophomore (6'1)

== Schedule and results ==
2013 Texas Tech Red Raiders baseball game log: 29–26

February: 8–1
Date	Time	Opponent	Rank	Stadium/Site	Score	Win	Loss	Save	Attendance	Overall	Big 12	Ref
February 17	4:00 p.m.	No. 31 Missouri State*; Red Raider Classic		Dan Law Field; Lubbock, TX	**W** 4–1	**Schamann** (1–0)	Johnson (0–1)	**Masek** (1)	2,605	1–0	—	
February 18	4:00 p.m.	Tennessee Tech*; Red Raider Classic		Dan Law Field; Lubbock, TX	**W** 9–5	**Broyles** (1–0)	Shepherd (0–1)	—	2,461	2–0	—	
February 19	10:00 a.m.	Tennessee Tech*; Red Raider Classic		Dan Law Field; Lubbock, TX	**W** 8–0	**Shellhorn** (1–0)	McWhirter (0–1)	—	2,221	3–0	—	
February 19	2:00 p.m.	No. 31 Missouri State*; Red Raider Classic		Dan Law Field; Lubbock, TX	**L** 2–4	Burgess (2–0)	**Neely** (0–1)	—	2,419	3–1	—	
February 24	5:00 p.m.	No. 18 St. John's*; Brooks Wallace; Memorial Baseball Classic		Dan Law Field; Lubbock, TX	**W** 4–1	**Schamann** (2–0)	Hansen (0–2)	—	2,625	4–1	—	
February 25	5:00 p.m.	Northern Illinois*; Brooks Wallace; Memorial Baseball Classic		Dan Law Field; Lubbock, TX	**W** 8–5	**Coulombe** (1–0)	Hermsen (0–2)	**Neely** (1)	2,685	5–1	—	
February 26	1:00 p.m.	No. 18 St. John's*; Brooks Wallace; Memorial Baseball Classic		Dan Law Field; Lubbock, TX	**W** 5–2	**Broyles** (2–0)	Carasiti (0–1)	—	2,779	6–1	—	
February 26	5:00 p.m.	Northern Illinois*; Brooks Wallace; Memorial Baseball Classic		Dan Law Field; Lubbock, TX	**W** 10–4	**Shellhorn** (2–0)	Barry (0–2)	**Parten** (1)	2,795	7–1	—	
February 27	5:00 p.m.	Northern Illinois*; Brooks Wallace; Memorial Baseball Classic	No. 24	Dan Law Field; Lubbock, TX	**W** 3–2	**Neely** (1–1)	Glancy (0–2)	—	2,311	8–1	—	

March: 8–11
Date	Time	Opponent	Rank	Stadium/Site	Score	Win	Loss	Save	Attendance	Overall	Big 12	Ref
March 2	12:00 p.m.	vs. No. 7 Arkansas*; Houston College Classic	No. 24	Minute Maid Park; Houston, TX	**L** 1–3	Stanek (3–0)	**Schamann** (2–1)	Astin (2)	8,540	8–2	—	
March 3	7:30 p.m.	vs. No. 4 Rice*; Houston College Classic	No. 24	Minute Maid Park; Houston, TX	**L** 2–6	Reckling (2–0)	**Shellhorn** (2–1)	Duffey (2)	8,589	8–3	—	
March 4	3:00 p.m.	vs. Houston*; Houston College Classic	No. 24	Minute Maid Park; Houston, TX	**W** 10–4	**Masek** (1–0)	Mannisto (1–1)	—	7,788	9–3	—	
March 6	7:30 p.m.	at No. 13 Arizona State*	No. 26	Packard Stadium; Tempe, AZ	**W** 8–4	**Neely** (2–1)	Miller (0–1)	—	1,546	10–3	—	
March 11	1:00 p.m.	at TCU*	No. 26	Lupton Stadium; Fort Worth, TX	**L** 1–2	Crichton (2–0)	**Schamann** (2–2)	Merck (3)	4,098	10–4	—	
March 12	2:00 p.m.	at TCU*	No. 27	Lupton Stadium; Fort Worth, TX	**L** 4–7	Morrison (3–0)	**Masek** (1–1)	Merck (4)	4,527	10–5	—	
March 13	6:00 p.m.	Alabama A&M*	No. 27	Dan Law Field; Lubbock, TX	**W** 21–1	**Shellhorn** (3–1)	Adams (1–2)	—	3,309	11–5	—	
March 14	1:00 p.m.	Alabama A&M*	No. 27	Dan Law Field; Lubbock, TX	**W** 25–5	**Paiz** (1–0)	Tucker (0–1)	—	2,615	12–5	—	
March 16	6:30 p.m.	at Baylor	No. 27	Baylor Ballpark; Waco, TX	**L** 4–9	Turley (2–0)	**Schamann** (2–3)	Browder (1)	2,790	12–6	0–1	
March 17	3:00 p.m.	at Baylor	No. 27	Baylor Ballpark; Waco, TX	**L** 3–4	Kuntz (2–2)	**McCrummen** (0–1)	—	2,856	12–7	0–2	
March 18	1:00 p.m.	at Baylor	No. 27	Baylor Ballpark; Waco, TX	**L** 1–8	Garner (2–2)	**Broyles** (2–1)	—	2,496	12–8	0–3	
March 20	6:00 p.m.	Florida Gulf Coast*		Dan Law Field; Lubbock, TX	**W** 11–4	**Paiz** (2–0)	Patrick (0–1)	—	2,368	13–8	—	
March 21	6:00 p.m.	Florida Gulf Coast*		Dan Law Field; Lubbock, TX	**W** 14–8	**Shellhorn** (4–1)	Bixler (2–3)	—	2,591	14–8	—	
March 23	6:30 p.m.	Oklahoma		Dan Law Field; Lubbock, TX	**W** 6–1	**Schamann** (3–3)	John (3–4)	—	3,277	15–8	1–3	
March 24	5:00 p.m.	Oklahoma		Dan Law Field; Lubbock, TX	**L** 3–5	Overton (4–0)	**Neely** (2–2)	—	4,187	15–9	1–4	
March 25	1:00 p.m.	Oklahoma		Dan Law Field; Lubbock, TX	**L** 2–8	Okert (3–2)	**Masek** (1–2)	—	3,472	15–10	1–5	
March 27	4:00 p.m.	New Mexico State*		Dan Law Field; Lubbock, TX	**L** 6–7	Mack (2–1)	**Masek** (1–3)	Coffman (5)	2,348	15–11	—	
March 30	6:00 p.m.	at Kansas		Hoglund Ballpark; Lawrence, KS	**W** 3–1	**Schamann** (4–3)	Duncan (3–4)	—	1,193	16–11	2–5	
March 31	2:00 p.m.	at Kansas		Hoglund Ballpark; Lawrence, KS	**L** 2–5	Benjamin (2–2)	**Neely** (2–3)	Poppe (4)	999	16–12	2–6	

April: 9–10
Date	Time	Opponent	Stadium/Site	Score	Win	Loss	Save	Attendance	Overall	Big 12	Ref
April 1	1:00 p.m.	at Kansas	Hoglund Ballpark; Lawrence, KS	**L** 2–5	Taylor (3–3)	**Paiz** (2–1)	—	1,039	16–13	2–7	
April 3	5:00 p.m.	Angelo State*	Dan Law Field; Lubbock, TX	**W** 13–8	**McCrummen** (1–1)	Albert (0–2)	—	2,382	17–13	—	
April 5	6:30 p.m.	No. 25 Texas	Dan Law Field; Lubbock, TX	**L** 4–7	Thornhill (4–2)	**Stewart** (0–1)	Knebel (6)	3,216	17–14	2–8	
April 6	6:30 p.m.	No. 25 Texas	Dan Law Field; Lubbock, TX	**W** 7–6 (14)	**Parten** (1–0)	Knebel (2–1)	—	4,281	18–14	3–8	
April 7	2:00 p.m.	No. 25 Texas	Dan Law Field; Lubbock, TX	**L** 3–14	Jacquez (2–1)	**Neely** (2–4)	Curtiss (2)	4,212	18–15	3–9	
April 11	3:00 p.m.	Dallas Baptist*	Dan Law Field; Lubbock, TX	**W** 7–1	**Corwin** (1–0)	Gilbreath (1–3)	—	2,335	19–15	—	
April 13	6:30 p.m.	Houston*	Dan Law Field; Lubbock, TX	**W** 15–4	**Neely** (3–4)	Hernandez (0–2)	—	2,929	20–15	—	
April 14	5:00 p.m.	Houston*	Dan Law Field; Lubbock, TX	**W** 7–1	**Schamann** (5–3)	Mannisto (1–2)	—	2,762	21–15	—	
April 15	1:00 p.m.	Houston*	Dan Law Field; Lubbock, TX	**W** 10–9 (12)	**McCrummen** (2–1)	Morehouse (1–2)	—	2,619	22–15	—	
April 17	6:00 p.m.	New Mexico*	Dan Law Field; Lubbock, TX	**L** 3–10	Jaramillo (3–3)	**Shellhorn** (4–2)	—	2,638	22–16	—	
April 18	1:00 p.m.	New Mexico*	Dan Law Field; Lubbock, TX	**L** 4–6	Wolff (1–2)	**Easterling** (0–1)	McClain (1)	2,392	22–17	—	
April 20	6:30 p.m.	at Oklahoma State	Allie P. Reynolds Stadium; Stillwater, OK	**L** 1–2	Barnes (4–3)	**McCrummen** (2–2)	—	485	22–18	3–10	
April 21	2:00 p.m.	at Oklahoma State	Allie P. Reynolds Stadium; Stillwater, OK	**L** 2–5	Stevens (4–4)	**Broyles** (2–2)	—	3,758	22–19	3–11	
April 22	1:00 p.m.	at Oklahoma State	Allie P. Reynolds Stadium; Stillwater, OK	**L** 1–7	McCurry (3–2)	**Masek** (1–4)	—	512	22–20	3–12	
April 24	7:00 p.m.	at New Mexico*	Isotopes Park; Albuquerque, NM	**W** 9–5	**McCrummen** (3–2)	Jaramillo (4–3)	—	218	23–20	—	
April 25	2:00 p.m.	at New Mexico*	Isotopes Park; Albuquerque, NM	**L** 13–14	McClain (1–1)	**Stewart** (0–2)	—	1,361	23–21	—	
April 27	6:30 p.m.	Missouri	Dan Law Field; Lubbock, TX	**L** 0–9	Zastryzny (4–2)	**Neely** (3–5)	—	2,856	23–22	3–13	
April 28	5:00 p.m.	Missouri	Dan Law Field; Lubbock, TX	**W** 4–3	**Schamann** (6–3)	Holovach (5–3)	**Masek** (2)	3,224	24–22	4–13	
April 29	1:00 p.m.	Missouri	Dan Law Field; Lubbock, TX	**W** 7–0	**Shellhorn** (5–2)	Graves (3–5)	—	3,018	25–22	5–13	

May: 4–4
Date	Time	Opponent	Stadium/Site	Score	Win	Loss	Save	Attendance	Overall	Big 12	Ref
May 1	5:00 p.m.	at New Mexico State*	Presley Askew Field; Las Cruces, NM	**W** 12–7	**Stewart** (1–2)	Collins (3–4)	—	501	26–22	—	
May 4	6:30 p.m.	at No. 12 Texas A&M	Blue Bell Park; College Station, TX	**L** 2–4	Wacha (7–0)	**Neely** (3–6)	Martin (3)	5,178	26–23	5–14	
May 5	2:00 p.m.	at No. 12 Texas A&M	Blue Bell Park; College Station, TX	**L** 2–7	Stripling (8–2)	**Shellhorn** (5–3)	—	4,775	26–24	5–15	
May 6	1:00 p.m.	at No. 12 Texas A&M	Blue Bell Park; College Station, TX	**W** 8–4 (12)	**Wheeler** (1–0)	Martin (5–5)	—	4,389	27–24	6–15	
May 8	3:00 p.m.	at Dallas Baptist*	Patriot Field; Dallas, TX	**W** 5–0	**Flora** (1–0)	Calhoun (3–2)	—	364	28–24	—	
May 17	6:30 p.m.	Kansas State	Dan Law Field; Lubbock, TX	**L** 5–7	Bahramzadeh (7–3)	**Schamann** (6–4)	Williams (6)	2,558	28–25	6–16	
May 18	6:30 p.m.	Kansas State	Dan Law Field; Lubbock, TX	**L** 1–5	Flattery (6–4)	**Neely** (3–7)	—	2,876	28–26	6–17	
May 19	1:00 p.m.	Kansas State	Dan Law Field; Lubbock, TX	**W** 8–2	**Masek** (2–4)	Wivinis (1–3)	—	2,807	29–26	7–17	

Legend: = Win = Loss = Postponement
Bold = Texas Tech team member

"*" indicates a non-conference game.
"No." represents ranking. All rankings from Collegiate Baseball on the date of the contest.

== Rankings ==
Ranking movements Legend: ██ Increase in ranking ██ Decrease in ranking — = Not ranked RV = Received votes
	Week																		
Poll	Pre	1	2	3	4	5	6	7	8	9	10	11	12	13	14	15	16	17	Final
Coaches'	—	—*	—	—	—	—	—	—	—	—	—	—	—	—	—	—	—	—	—
Baseball America	—	—	—	—	—	—	—	—	—	—	—	—	—	—	—	—	—	—	—
Collegiate Baseball^	RV	—	24	26	27	—	—	—	—	—	—	—	—	—	—	—	—	—	—
NCBWA†	RV	—	RV	RV	RV	—	—	—	—	—	—	—	—	—	—	—	—	—	—

^ Collegiate Baseball ranked 40 teams in their preseason poll, but only ranked 30 teams weekly during the season.
† NCBWA ranks 30 teams in their preseason poll, but only ranks 25 teams weekly during the season.
* A new poll was not released for this week, so for comparison purposes, the previous week's ranking is inserted in this week's slot.
