= 2012 NCAA Division I baseball season =

Baseball season

- Duration: February 17, 2012–June 25, 2012
- Number of teams: 297
- Preseason No. 1: Florida

Tournament
- Duration: June 1–25, 2012

College World Series
- Champions: Arizona (4th title)
- Runners-up: South Carolina (4th CWS Appearance)
- Winning coach: Andy Lopez (2nd title)
- MOP: Robert Refsnyder (Arizona)

Seasons
- ← 2011 2013 →

The 2012 NCAA Division I baseball season, play of college baseball in the United States organized by the National Collegiate Athletic Association (NCAA) at the Division I level, began on February 17, 2012. The season progressed through the regular season, many conference tournaments and championship series, and concluded with the 2012 NCAA Division I baseball tournament and 2012 College World Series. The College World Series, consisting of the eight remaining teams in the NCAA tournament and held annually in Omaha, Nebraska, at TD Ameritrade Park concluded on June 25, 2012, with the final game of the best of three championship series. Arizona defeated two-time defending champion South Carolina two games to none to claim their fourth championship.

== Realignment ==
=== New programs ===
Nebraska-Omaha joined Division I from the Division II MIAA.

=== Dropped programs ===
Cleveland State dropped its varsity baseball program following the 2011 season. Two programs which had competed as Division I Independents, Le Moyne and New Orleans, dropped to Division II. Centenary, which had been a member of The Summit League, dropped to Division III.

=== Conference changes ===
Several conferences added single programs prior to the 2012 season. The Pac-12 Conference added Utah, previously a Mountain West Conference member, and the West Coast Conference added BYU, also a previous Mountain West member. Nebraska moved from the Big 12 Conference to the Big Ten Conference. Campbell moved from the Atlantic Sun Conference to the Big South Conference.

Three Independents joined conferences prior to the season. Savannah State and North Carolina Central both joined the Mid-Eastern Athletic Conference, while SIU Edwardsville joined the Ohio Valley Conference.

=== Conference formats ===
With the addition of Savannah State and North Carolina Central, the Mid-Eastern Athletic Conference split into two divisions, the North and the South.

== Season outlook ==
Coaches' Poll
Ranking	Team
1	Florida
2	South Carolina
3	Stanford
4	North Carolina
5	Texas
6	Texas A&M
7	Rice
8	Arkansas
9	Florida State
10	Georgia Tech
11	TCU
12	Vanderbilt
13	Miami
14	LSU
15	Oklahoma
16	Cal State Fullerton
17	Virginia
18	UCLA
19	Oregon State
20	Arizona
21	St. John's
22	California
23	Clemson
24	Louisville
25	Georgia

Collegiate Baseball News
Ranking	Team
1	Florida
2	South Carolina
3	Stanford
4	North Carolina
5	Texas
6	Texas A&M
7	Rice
8	Arkansas
9	Georgia Tech
10	TCU
11	St. John's
12	LSU
13	Florida State
14	Miami (FL)
15	Louisville
16	Oklahoma
17	Arizona State
18	Georgia
19	UCLA
20	Arizona
21	Cal State Fullerton
22	California
23	Vanderbilt
24	Oregon State
25	Clemson

Baseball America
Ranking	Team
1	Florida
2	Stanford
3	South Carolina
4	Arkansas
5	Arizona
6	Rice
7	Texas A&M
8	LSU
9	North Carolina
10	Vanderbilt
11	Georgia
12	Georgia Tech
13	Texas
14	UCLA
15	TCU
16	Clemson
17	Arizona State
18	Miami (FL)
19	Oklahoma
20	Florida State
21	UCF
22	Ole Miss
23	Oregon State
24	Louisville
25	Cal State Fullerton

NCBWA
Ranking	Team
1	Florida
2	South Carolina
3	North Carolina
4	Stanford
5	Texas A&M
6	Arkansas
7	Texas
8	Rice
9	Georgia Tech
10	Florida State
11	Vanderbilt
12	LSU
13	TCU
14	Oklahoma
15	Arizona State
16	Miami (FL)
17	Clemson
18	Arizona
19	Cal State Fullerton
20	UCLA
21	Georgia
22	Oregon State
23	Virginia
24	UC Irvine
25	Louisville

== Conference standings ==
2012 America East Conference baseball standings
	Conf.						Overall
Team	W		L		T	PCT	W		L		T	PCT
No. 8 Stony Brook ‍†‍‡‍^{y}	21	–	3	–	0	.875	52	–	15	–	0	.776
Albany ‍‍‍	16	–	8	–	0	.667	22	–	32	–	1	.409
Binghamton ‍‍‍	13	–	9	–	0	.591	23	–	26	–	0	.469
Maine ‍‍‍	11	–	11	–	0	.500	28	–	28	–	0	.500
Hartford ‍‍‍	7	–	17	–	0	.292	16	–	40	–	0	.286
UMBC ‍‍‍	2	–	22	–	0	.083	10	–	42	–	0	.192
† – Conference champion ‡ – Tournament champion y – Invited to the 2012 NCAA Division I baseball tournament As of June 17, 2012; Rankings from Coaches' Poll

2012 Atlantic Coast Conference baseball standings
	Conf.						Overall
Team	W		L		T	PCT	W		L		T	PCT
Atlantic
No. 3 Florida State ^{x}‍‍‍^{y}	24	–	6	–	0	.800	50	–	17	–	0	.746
No. 16 NC State ‍‍‍^{y}	19	–	11	–	0	.633	39	–	17	–	0	.696
Clemson ‍‍‍^{y}	16	–	14	–	0	.533	34	–	26	–	0	.567
Wake Forest ‍‍‍	13	–	17	–	0	.433	33	–	24	–	0	.579
Maryland ‍‍‍	10	–	20	–	0	.333	32	–	24	–	0	.571
Boston College ‍‍‍	10	–	20	–	0	.333	21	–	34	–	0	.382
Coastal
No. 5 North Carolina ^{x}‍‍‍^{y}	22	–	8	–	0	.733	44	–	14	–	0	.759
No. 15 Virginia ‍‍‍^{y}	18	–	12	–	0	.600	39	–	16	–	1	.705
No. 21 Miami ‍‍‍^{y}	16	–	14	–	0	.533	36	–	21	–	0	.632
No. 24 Georgia Tech ‍‍‡‍^{y}	12	–	18	–	0	.400	37	–	24	–	0	.607
Virginia Tech ‍‍‍	11	–	19	–	0	.367	34	–	21	–	0	.618
Duke ‍‍‍	9	–	21	–	0	.300	21	–	34	–	0	.382
x – Division champion ‡ – Tournament champion y – Invited to the 2012 NCAA Division I baseball tournament As of June 1, 2012; Rankings from Coaches' Poll

2012 Atlantic Sun Conference baseball standings
	Conf.				Overall
Team	W		L	PCT	W		L	PCT
Belmont ‍†‍‡‍^{y}	17	–	10	.630	39	–	24	.619
South Carolina Upstate ‍‍‍	16	–	10	.615	33	–	20	.623
Kennesaw State ‍‍‍	15	–	11	.577	34	–	25	.576
Mercer ‍‍‍	15	–	12	.556	38	–	21	.644
Stetson ‍‍‍	15	–	12	.556	35	–	23	.603
Florida Gulf Coast ‍‍‍	15	–	12	.556	26	–	31	.456
Lipscomb ‍‍‍	14	–	13	.519	25	–	30	.455
North Florida ‍‍‍	12	–	15	.444	31	–	24	.564
East Tennessee State ‍‍‍	8	–	19	.296	23	–	32	.418
Jacksonville ‍‍‍	7	–	20	.259	18	–	38	.321
† – Conference champion ‡ – Tournament champion y – Invited to the NCAA tournament As of June 30, 2012; Rankings from Collegiate Baseball

2012 Big 12 Conference baseball standings
	Conf.				Overall
Team	W		L	PCT	W		L	PCT
No. 10 Baylor ‍†‍‍^{y}	20	–	4	.833	49	–	17	.742
No. 19 Texas A&M ‍‍‍^{y}	16	–	8	.667	43	–	18	.705
Texas ‍‍‍	14	–	10	.583	30	–	22	.577
No. 13 Oklahoma ‍‍‍^{y}	13	–	10	.565	42	–	25	.627
Oklahoma State ‍‍‍	13	–	11	.542	32	–	25	.561
Missouri ‍‍‡‍^{y}	10	–	14	.417	33	–	28	.541
Kansas ‍‍‍	7	–	16	.304	24	–	34	.414
Kansas State ‍‍‍	7	–	17	.292	27	–	31	.466
Texas Tech ‍‍‍	7	–	17	.292	29	–	26	.527
† – Conference champion ‡ – Tournament champion y – Invited to the NCAA tournament Rankings from Collegiate Baseball

2012 Big East Conference baseball standings
	Conf.						Overall
Team	W		L		T	PCT	W		L		T	PCT
#25 Louisville †^{y} ‍‍‍	18	–	9	–	0	.667	42	–	22	–	0	.656
St. John's ‍†‍‡‍^{y}	18	–	9	–	0	.667	40	–	23	–	0	.635
Seton Hall ‍‍‍	17	–	10	–	0	.630	34	–	24	–	0	.586
South Florida ‍‍‍	17	–	10	–	0	.630	38	–	22	–	0	.633
Connecticut ‍‍‍	16	–	11	–	0	.593	31	–	27	–	1	.534
Rutgers ‍‍‍	16	–	11	–	0	.593	31	–	25	–	0	.554
Notre Dame ‍‍‍	14	–	13	–	0	.519	31	–	27	–	0	.534
Pittsburgh ‍‍‍	10	–	17	–	0	.370	28	–	28	–	0	.500
Georgetown ‍‍‍	10	–	17	–	0	.370	24	–	29	–	0	.453
Villanova ‍‍‍	10	–	17	–	0	.370	28	–	27	–	0	.509
West Virginia ‍‍‍	9	–	18	–	0	.333	23	–	32	–	0	.418
Cincinnati ‍‍‍	7	–	20	–	0	.259	18	–	38	–	0	.321
† – Conference champion ‡ – Tournament champion y – Invited to the NCAA tournament As of June 15, 2012; Rankings from Coaches' Poll

2012 Big Ten Conference baseball standings
	Conf.				Overall
Team	W		L	PCT	W		L	PCT
No. 15 Purdue ‍†‍‡‍^{y}	17	–	7	.708	45	–	14	.763
Indiana ‍‍‍	16	–	8	.667	32	–	28	.533
Penn State ‍‍‍	15	–	9	.625	29	–	27	.518
Nebraska ‍‍‍	14	–	10	.583	35	–	23	.603
Michigan State ‍‍‍^{y}	13	–	11	.542	37	–	23	.617
Ohio State ‍‍‍	11	–	13	.458	33	–	27	.550
Illinois ‍‍‍	11	–	13	.458	28	–	25	.528
Minnesota ‍‍‍	11	–	13	.458	29	–	27	.518
Iowa ‍‍‍	10	–	14	.417	23	–	27	.460
Michigan ‍‍‍	8	–	16	.333	22	–	34	.393
Northwestern ‍‍‍	6	–	18	.250	18	–	36	.333
† – Conference champion ‡ – Tournament champion y – Invited to the NCAA tournament As of June 30, 2012; Rankings from Coaches' Poll

2012 Big West Conference baseball standings
	Conf.				Overall
Team	W		L	PCT	W		L	PCT
No. 19 Cal State Fullerton ‍†‍‍^{y}	17	–	7	.708	36	–	21	.632
Cal Poly ‍‍‍	16	–	8	.667	36	–	20	.643
Long Beach State ‍‍‍	15	–	9	.625	28	–	27	.509
UC Irvine ‍‍‍	13	–	11	.542	31	–	25	.554
UC Davis ‍‍‍	12	–	12	.500	27	–	30	.474
UC Santa Barbara ‍‍‍	10	–	14	.417	28	–	28	.500
Cal State Northridge ‍‍‍	10	–	14	.417	23	–	30	.434
UC Riverside ‍‍‍	9	–	15	.375	22	–	32	.407
Pacific ‍‍‍	6	–	18	.250	16	–	40	.286
† – Conference champion y – Invited to the NCAA Division I Baseball Championship; As of June 3, 2012; Rankings from Coaches' Poll

2012 Conference USA baseball standings
	Conf.						Overall
Team	W		L		T	PCT	W		L		T	PCT
No. 9 Rice ‍†‍‍^{y}	17	–	7	–	0	.708	40	–	17	–	0	.702
No. 18 UCF ‍‍‍^{y}	16	–	8	–	0	.667	43	–	15	–	0	.741
Tulane ‍‍‍	14	–	10	–	0	.583	38	–	20	–	0	.655
Southern Miss ‍‍‍	14	–	10	–	0	.583	32	–	24	–	0	.571
Memphis ‍‍‍	14	–	10	–	0	.583	31	–	28	–	0	.525
East Carolina ‍‍‍^{y}	13	–	10	–	1	.563	35	–	22	–	1	.612
UAB ‍‍‡‍^{y}	9	–	15	–	0	.375	32	–	28	–	0	.533
Houston ‍‍‍	5	–	18	–	1	.229	18	–	35	–	1	.343
Marshall ‍‍‍	5	–	19	–	0	.208	17	–	37	–	0	.315
† – Conference champion ‡ – Tournament champion y – Invited to the 2012 NCAA Division I baseball tournament As of May 30 2012; Rankings from Coaches' Poll

2012 NCAA Division I baseball independents standings
	Conf.				Overall
Team	W		L	PCT	W		L	PCT
Dallas Baptist ‍‍‍^{y}		–		–	41	–	19	.683
Longwood ‍‍‍		–		–	27	–	21	.563
Cal State Bakersfield ‍‍‍		–		–	25	–	30	.455
Seattle ‍‍‍		–		–	23	–	30	.434
Nebraska-Omaha ‍‍‍		–		–	12	–	36	.250
y – Invited to the NCAA tournament As of June 30, 2012; Rankings from Collegiate Baseball

2012 Pac-12 Conference baseball standings
	Conf.				Overall
Team	W		L	PCT	W		L	PCT
No. 4 UCLA ‍†‍‍^{y}	20	–	10	.667	48	–	16	.750
No. 11 Arizona ‍‍‍^{y}	20	–	10	.667	48	–	17	.738
No. 10 Oregon ‍‍‍^{y}	19	–	11	.633	46	–	19	.708
No. 13 Stanford ‍‍‍^{y}	18	–	12	.600	41	–	18	.695
No. 17 Oregon State ‍‍‍^{y}	18	–	12	.600	40	–	20	.667
Arizona State ‍‍‍	18	–	12	.600	36	–	20	.643
Washington ‍‍‍	13	–	17	.433	30	–	25	.545
California ‍‍‍	12	–	18	.400	29	–	25	.537
Washington State ‍‍‍	12	–	18	.400	28	–	28	.500
USC ‍‍‍	8	–	22	.267	23	–	32	.418
Utah ‍‍‍	7	–	23	.233	14	–	42	.250
† – Conference champion y – Invited to the 2012 NCAA Division I baseball tournament As of May 28, 2012; Rankings from Coaches' Poll

2012 Southeastern Conference baseball standings
	Conf.				Overall
Team	W		L	PCT	W		L	PCT
Eastern
No. 2 South Carolina ^{x}‍‍‍^{y}	18	–	11	.621	49	–	20	.710
No. 6 Florida ‍‍‍^{y}	18	–	12	.600	47	–	20	.701
No. 19 Kentucky ‍‍‍^{y}	18	–	12	.600	45	–	18	.714
No. 25 Vanderbilt ‍‍‍^{y}	16	–	14	.533	35	–	28	.556
Georgia ‍‍‍	14	–	15	.483	31	–	26	.544
Tennessee ‍‍‍	8	–	22	.267	24	–	31	.436
Western
No. 11 LSU ^{x}‍†‍‍^{y}	19	–	11	.633	47	–	18	.723
No. 3 Arkansas ‍‍‍^{y}	16	–	14	.533	46	–	22	.676
Mississippi State ‍‍‡‍^{y}	16	–	14	.533	40	–	24	.625
Ole Miss ‍‍‍^{y}	14	–	16	.467	37	–	26	.587
Auburn ‍‍‍	13	–	17	.433	31	–	28	.525
Alabama ‍‍‍	9	–	21	.300	21	–	34	.382
x – Division champion † – Conference champion ‡ – Tournament champion y – Invited to the NCAA tournament As of June 26, 2012; Rankings from Coaches' Poll

2012 Southern Conference baseball standings
	Conf.				Overall
Team	W		L	PCT	W		L	PCT
Appalachian State ‍†‍‍^{y}	21	–	9	.700	38	–	14	.731
College of Charleston ‍†‍‍^{y}	21	–	9	.700	37	–	18	.673
Elon ‍‍‍	20	–	10	.667	31	–	24	.564
Samford ‍‍‡‍^{y}	19	–	11	.633	35	–	21	.625
Western Carolina ‍‍‍	16	–	14	.533	32	–	22	.593
Georgia Southern ‍‍‍	15	–	15	.500	30	–	26	.536
Furman ‍‍‍	13	–	17	.433	26	–	29	.473
The Citadel ‍‍‍	13	–	17	.433	24	–	31	.436
UNC Greensboro ‍‍‍	10	–	20	.333	25	–	27	.481
Davidson ‍‍‍	9	–	21	.300	22	–	32	.407
Wofford ‍‍‍	8	–	22	.267	17	–	31	.354
† – Conference champion ‡ – Tournament champion y – Invited to the NCAA Division I Baseball Championship; As of May 20, 2012; Rankings from Collegiate Baseball

2012 West Coast Conference baseball standings
	Conf.				Overall
Team	W		L	PCT	W		L	PCT
No. 28 Pepperdine ‍†‍‍^{y}	16	–	8	.667	36	–	23	.610
San Diego ‍‍‍^{y}	15	–	9	.625	40	–	17	.702
Gonzaga ‍‍‍	14	–	10	.583	34	–	22	.607
Loyola Marymount ‍‍‍	14	–	10	.583	27	–	27	.500
San Francisco ‍‍‍	14	–	10	.583	29	–	30	.492
Portland ‍‍‍	12	–	12	.500	27	–	24	.529
BYU ‍‍‍	10	–	14	.417	22	–	27	.449
Saint Mary's ‍‍‍	8	–	16	.333	24	–	29	.453
Santa Clara ‍‍‍	5	–	19	.208	26	–	28	.481
† – Conference champion y – Invited to the 2012 NCAA Division I baseball tournament As of June 6, 2012; Rankings from Collegiate Baseball

2012 Western Athletic Conference baseball standings
	Conf.				Overall
Team	W		L	PCT	W		L	PCT
New Mexico State ‍†‍‍^{y}	11	–	7	.611	35	–	22	.614
Nevada ‍‍‍	11	–	7	.611	32	–	25	.561
Sacramento State ‍‍‍	11	–	7	.611	31	–	26	.544
Hawaii ‍‍‍	10	–	8	.556	30	–	25	.545
Fresno State ‍‍‡‍^{y}	8	–	10	.444	28	–	26	.519
Louisiana Tech ‍‍‍	7	–	11	.389	27	–	28	.491
San Jose State ‍‍‍	5	–	13	.278	22	–	29	.431
† – Conference champion ‡ – Tournament champion y – Invited to the NCAA tournament As of May 26, 2012; Rankings from Collegiate Baseball

=== Conference winners and tournaments ===
Thirty athletic conferences each end their regular seasons with a single-elimination tournament or a double-elimination tournament. The teams in each conference that win their regular season title are given the number one seed in each tournament. The winners of these tournaments receive automatic invitations to the 2012 NCAA Division I baseball tournament, with the exception of the Great West Conference, as that league remains in a provisional status.

Conference	Regular season winner	Conference Player of the Year	Conference Coach of the Year	Conference tournament	Tournament venue (city)	Tournament winner
America East Conference	Stony Brook	Travis Jankowski, Stony Brook	Matt Senk, Stony Brook	2012 America East Conference baseball tournament	Joe Nathan Field • Stony Brook, NY	Stony Brook
Atlantic 10 Conference	Dayton/Saint Louis	Jeff Roy, Rhode Island	Darin Hendrickson, Saint Louis	2012 Atlantic 10 Conference baseball tournament	Houlihan Park • Bronx, NY	Dayton
Atlantic Coast Conference	Atlantic – Florida State; Coastal – North Carolina	James Ramsey, Florida State	Mike Martin, Florida State	2012 Atlantic Coast Conference baseball tournament	NewBridge Bank Park • Greensboro, NC	Georgia Tech
Atlantic Sun Conference	Belmont	Gaither Bumgardner, South Carolina Upstate	Matt Fincher, South Carolina Upstate	2012 Atlantic Sun Conference baseball tournament	Melching Field at Conrad Park • DeLand, FL	Belmont
Big 12 Conference	Baylor	Josh Ludy, Baylor	Steve Smith, Baylor	2012 Big 12 baseball tournament	RedHawks Ballpark • Oklahoma City, OK	Missouri
Big East Conference	Louisville	Patrick Kivelehan, Rutgers	Ed Blankmeyer, St. John's	2012 Big East Conference baseball tournament	Bright House Field • Clearwater, FL	St. John's
Big South Conference	Coastal Carolina	Daniel Bowman, Coastal Carolina	Gary Gilmore, Coastal Carolina	2012 Big South Conference baseball tournament	Williard Baseball Stadium • High Point, NC	Coastal Carolina
Big Ten Conference	Purdue	Kevin Plawecki, Purdue	Doug Schreiber, Purdue	2012 Big Ten Conference baseball tournament	Huntington Park • Columbus, OH	Purdue
Big West Conference	Cal State Fullerton	Mitch Haniger, Cal Poly	Rick Vanderhook, Cal State Fullerton	No tournament, regular season champion earns auto bid		
Colonial Athletic Association	UNC Wilmington	Donny Poma, Hofstra	Mark Scalf, UNC Wilmington	2012 Colonial Athletic Association baseball tournament	Eagle Field at Veterans Memorial Park • Harrisonburg, VA	UNC Wilmington
Conference USA	Rice	Jacob Wilson, Memphis	Wayne Graham, Rice	2012 Conference USA baseball tournament	Trustmark Park • Pearl, MS	UAB
Great West Conference	Utah Valley	Goose Kallunki, Utah Valley	Eric Madsen, Utah Valley	2012 Great West Conference baseball tournament	Harold Kraft Memorial Field • Grand Forks, ND	Utah Valley
Horizon League	Valparaiso	Tristan Moore, Wright State	Tracy Woodson, Valparaiso	2012 Horizon League baseball tournament	Les Miller Field • Chicago, IL	Valparaiso
Ivy League	Gehrig - Cornell; Rolfe - Dartmouth	Dario Pizzano, Columbia	—N/a	2012 Ivy League Baseball Championship Series	Hoy Field • Ithaca, NY	Cornell
Metro Atlantic Athletic Conference	Manhattan	Chris Burke, Iona	Bill Currier, Fairfield	2012 Metro Atlantic Athletic Conference baseball tournament	Joseph L. Bruno Stadium • Troy, NY	Manhattan
Mid-American Conference	East - Kent State; West - Toledo	George Roberts, Kent State	Scott Stricklin, Kent State	2012 Mid-American Conference baseball tournament	All Pro Freight Stadium • Avon, OH	Kent State
Mid-Eastern Athletic Conference	Northern - Delaware State; Southern - Bethune-Cookman	Ryan Haas, Delaware State	J. P. Blandin, Delaware State	2012 Mid–Eastern Athletic Conference baseball tournament	Marty L. Miller Field • Norfolk, VA	Bethune-Cookman
Missouri Valley Conference	Indiana State	Jeremy Lucas, Indiana State	Rick Heller, Indiana State	2012 Missouri Valley Conference baseball tournament	Hammons Field • Springfield, MO	Creighton
Mountain West Conference	New Mexico/Texas Christian	Mitch Garver, New Mexico; DJ Peterson, New Mexico	Ray Birmingham, New Mexico	2012 Mountain West Conference baseball tournament	Earl Wilson Stadium • Paradise, NV	New Mexico
Northeast Conference	Bryant	Ryan Kresky, Fairleigh Dickinson	Steve Owens, Bryant	2012 Northeast Conference baseball tournament	Senator Thomas J. Dodd Memorial Stadium • Norwich, CT	Sacred Heart
Ohio Valley Conference	Austin Peay/Eastern Kentucky	Trenton Moses, Southeast Missouri State	Jason Stein, Eastern Kentucky	2012 Ohio Valley Conference baseball tournament	Pringles Park • Jackson, TN	Austin Peay
Pac-12 Conference	UCLA/Arizona	Alex Mejia, Arizona	Andy Lopez, Arizona	No tournament, regular season champion earns auto bid		
Patriot League	Army	Kevin McKague, Army	Joe Sottolano, Army	2012 Patriot League baseball tournament	Campus Sites	Army
Southeastern Conference	West – LSU; East – South Carolina	Raph Rhymes, LSU	Gary Henderson, Kentucky	2012 SEC baseball tournament	Regions Park • Hoover, AL	Mississippi State
Southern Conference	Appalachian State/College of Charleston	Marty Gantt, College of Charleston	Chris Pollard, Appalachian State	2012 Southern Conference baseball tournament	Fluor Field at the West End • Greenville, SC	Samford
Southland Conference	Sam Houston State	Brock Hebert, Southeastern Louisiana	David Pierce, Sam Houston State	2012 Southland Conference baseball tournament	Bobcat Ballpark • San Marcos, TX	Texas–Arlington
Southwestern Athletic Conference	East - Jackson State; West - Southern	Kendall Logan, Jackson State	Waskyla Cullivan, Jackson State	2012 Southwestern Athletic Conference baseball tournament	Lee–Hines Field • Baton Rouge, LA	Prairie View A&M
The Summit League	Oral Roberts	Jared Schlehuber, Oral Roberts	John Musachio, Oakland	2012 The Summit League baseball tournament	J. L. Johnson Stadium • Oklahoma City, OK	Oral Roberts
Sun Belt Conference	Florida Atlantic	Jeremy Sy, Louisiana–Monroe	Tommy Raffo, Arkansas State	2012 Sun Belt Conference baseball tournament	Bowling Green Ballpark • Bowling Green, KY	Louisiana–Monroe
West Coast Conference	Pepperdine	Joe Sever, Pepperdine	Steve Rodriguez, Pepperdine	No tournament, regular season champion earns auto bid		
Western Athletic Conference	New Mexico State	Andrew Ayers, Sacramento State	Reggie Christiansen, Sacramento State	2012 Western Athletic Conference baseball tournament	HoHoKam Stadium • Mesa, AZ	Fresno State

== College World Series ==
The 2012 season marked the sixty sixth NCAA baseball tournament, which culminated with the eight team College World Series. The College World Series was held in Omaha, Nebraska. The eight teams played a double-elimination format, with Arizona claiming their fourth championship with a two games to none series win over South Carolina in the final.

=== Bracket ===
First round
2	UCLA	9
Stony Brook	1
Arizona	4
3	Florida State	3
Stony Brook	2
3	Florida State	12
Kent State	1
Arkansas	8
1	Florida	3
8	South Carolina	7
Kent State	5
1	Florida	4

Second round
2	UCLA	0
Arizona	4
3	Florida State	4
2	UCLA	1
Arkansas	2
8	South Carolina	1
Kent State	1
8	South Carolina	4

Semifinals
Arizona	10	-
3	Florida State	3	-
Arkansas	0	2
8	South Carolina	2	3

Finals
Arizona	5	4	-
8	South Carolina	1	1	-

== Award winners ==
=== Major player of the year awards ===
- Dick Howser Trophy: Mike Zunino, Florida
- Baseball America: Mike Zunino, Florida
- Collegiate Baseball/Louisville Slugger: Nick Petree, Missouri State
- American Baseball Coaches Association: James Ramsey, Florida State
- Golden Spikes Award: Mike Zunino, Florida

=== Major freshman of the year awards ===
- Baseball America Freshman Of The Year: Carlos Rodon, NC State
- Collegiate Baseball Freshman Player of the Year: Michael Conforto, Oregon State
- Collegiate Baseball Freshman Pitcher of the Year: Carlos Rodon, NC State

=== Major coach of the year awards ===
- American Baseball Coaches Association:
- Baseball America:
- Collegiate Baseball Coach of the Year:
- National Collegiate Baseball Writers Association (NCBWA) National Coach of the Year: Matt Senk, Stony Brook
- Chuck Tanner Collegiate Baseball Manager of the Year Award:
- ABCA/Baseball America Assistant Coach of the Year:

=== Other major awards ===
- Lowe's Senior CLASS Award (baseball) (outstanding Senior of the Year in baseball): James Ramsey, Florida State
- Johnny Bench Award (Catcher of the Year): Mike Zunino, Florida
- Brooks Wallace Award (Shortstop of the Year): Zach Vincej, Pepperdine
- American Baseball Coaches Association Gold Glove:

== See also ==
- 2012 NCAA Division I baseball rankings
- 2012 NCAA Division I baseball tournament
- 2012 College World Series
