= 2012 Texas Longhorns baseball team =

American college baseball season

2012 Texas Longhorns baseball
- Conference: Big 12 Conference
- Record: 30–22 (14–10 Big 12)
- Head coach: Augie Garrido (16th season)
- Assistant coaches: Tommy Harmon (23rd season); Skip Johnson (6th season)
- Home stadium: UFCU Disch–Falk Field

2012 Big 12 Conference baseball standings
	Conf.				Overall
Team	W		L	PCT	W		L	PCT
No. 10 Baylor ‍†‍‍^{y}	20	–	4	.833	49	–	17	.742
No. 19 Texas A&M ‍‍‍^{y}	16	–	8	.667	43	–	18	.705
Texas ‍‍‍	14	–	10	.583	30	–	22	.577
No. 13 Oklahoma ‍‍‍^{y}	13	–	10	.565	42	–	25	.627
Oklahoma State ‍‍‍	13	–	11	.542	32	–	25	.561
Missouri ‍‍‡‍^{y}	10	–	14	.417	33	–	28	.541
Kansas ‍‍‍	7	–	16	.304	24	–	34	.414
Kansas State ‍‍‍	7	–	17	.292	27	–	31	.466
Texas Tech ‍‍‍	7	–	17	.292	29	–	26	.527
† – Conference champion ‡ – Tournament champion y – Invited to the NCAA tournament Rankings from Collegiate Baseball

The 2012 Texas Longhorns baseball team represented the Texas Longhorns baseball program for the University of Texas in the 2012 NCAA Division I baseball season. Augie Garrido coached the team in his 16th season at Texas.

== Personnel ==
=== Roster ===
2012 Texas Longhorns roster
Pitchers: 13 – Kirby Bellow – Sophomore; 15 – Justin Peters – Sophomore; 17 – Josh Urban – Junior; 19 – Sam Stafford – Senior; 24 – Parker French – Freshman; 28 – Austin Dicharry – Senior; 29 – Corey Knebel – Sophomore; 32 – Dillon Peters – Freshman; 36 – Nathan Thornhill – Sophomore; 37 – Toller Boardman – Freshman; 41 – Hoby Milner – Junior; 43 – John Curtiss – Freshman; 50 – Trevor Tekyl – Sophomore	Catchers: 12 – Jacob Felts – Sophomore; 38 – Hunter Redman – Freshman; 42 – Patrick Marsh – Junior; 45 – Grant Martin – Freshman; 46 – Hunter Wilcox – Senior; Infielders: 5 – Christian Summers – Sophomore; 6 – Erich Weiss – Sophomore; 7 – Jordan Etier – Senior; 8 – Brooks Marlow – Freshman; 11 – Alex Silver – Sophomore; 14 – Kevin Lusson – Senior; 48 – Sam Shaw – Freshman	Outfielders: 1 – Cohl Walla – Junior; 2 – Mark Payton – Sophomore; 4 – Collin Shaw – Freshman; 9 – Tim Maitland – Senior; 30 – Landon Steinhagen – Junior; 33 – Jonathan Walsh – Junior; 34 – Matt Moynihan – Junior; 40 – Taylor Stell – Freshman

=== Coaches ===
2012 Texas Longhorns coaching staff
- Augie Garrido – Head coach – 16th
- Tommy Harmon – Assistant coach – 23rd
- Skip Johnson – Assistant coach – 6th
- Lucas Kephart – Student assistant coach – 1st

== Schedule ==
2012 Texas Longhorns baseball game log
Legend: = Win = Loss = Canceled Bold = Texas team member
Regular season (30–20)

February (3–5)
Date	Time (CT)	Opponent	Rank	Stadium	Score	Win	Loss	Save	Attendance	Overall record	Big 12 Record	Box Score	Recap
February 18	2:00 PM	Duke*	No. 5	UFCU Disch–Falk Field • Austin, TX	**W** 4–0	**Thonrhill** **(1–0)**	Stroman (0–1)	**Knebel** **(1)**	5,918	1–0	—	Box Score	Recap
February 18	6:00 PM	Duke*	No. 5	UFCU Disch–Falk Field • Austin, TX	**W** 5–3	**Milner** **(1–0)**	Swart (0–1)	**Knebel** **(2)**	6,311	2–0	—	Box Score	Recap
February 19	12:00 PM	Duke*	No. 5	UFCU Disch–Falk Field • Austin, TX	**L** 2–5	Huber (1–0)	**Curtiss** **(0–1)**	Piscotty (1)	6,448	2–1	—	Box Score	Recap
February 21	6:00 PM	UT Arlington*	No. 7	UFCU Disch–Falk Field • Austin, TX	**L** 5–7	Day (2–0)	**Dicharry** **(0–1)**	Nack (1)	5,466	2–2	—	Box Score	Recap
February 24	7:30 PM	at No. 3 Stanford*	No. 7	Klein Field at Sunken Diamond • Stanford, CA	**L** 2–7	Appel (2–0)	**Thornhill** **(1–1)**	Schmidt (1)	2,624	2–3	—	Box Score	Recap
February 25	3:00 PM	at No. 3 Stanford*	No. 7	Klein Field at Sunken Diamond • Stanford, CA	**L** 2–6	Mooneyham (2–0)	**Milner** **(1–1)**	—	2,661	2–4	—	Box Score	Recap
February 26	3:00 PM	at No. 3 Stanford*	No. 7	Klein Field at Sunken Diamond • Stanford, CA	**L** 1–15	Hochstatter (1–0)	**Curtiss** **(0–2)**	—	2,542	2–5	—	Box Score	Recap
February 28	6:00 PM	Houston Baptist*		UFCU Disch–Falk Field • Austin, TX	**W** 2–0	**French** **(1–0)**	Schafer (0–1)	**Knebel** **(3)**	5,302	3–5	—	Box Score	Recap

March (12–5)
Date	Time (CT)	Opponent	Rank	Stadium	Score	Win	Loss	Save	Attendance	Overall record	Big 12 Record	Box Score	Recap
March 2	7:00 PM	vs. No. 4 Rice* (Houston College Classic)		Minute Maid Park • Houston, TX	**W** 11–8	**Thornhill** **(2–1)**	Kubitza (1–1)	**French** **(1)**	8,540	4–5	—	Box Score	Recap
March 3	3:30 PM	vs. Tennessee* (Houston College Classic)		Minute Maid Park • Houston, TX	**L** 4–5	Godley (2–0)	**Milner** **(1–2)**	Williams (2)		4–6	—	Box Score	Recap
March 4	11:00 AM	vs. No. 7 Arkansas* (Houston College Classic)		Minute Maid Park • Houston, TX	**L** 3–7	Baxendale (4–0)	**Jacquez** **(0–1)**	Astin (3)		4–7	—	Box Score	Recap
March 6	4:00 PM	Dallas Baptist*		UFCU Disch–Falk Field • Austin, TX	**W** 2–1 ^{12}	**Knebel** **(1–0)**	Smith (1–1)	—	5,330	5–7	—	Box Score	Recap
March 9	6:00 PM	Loyola Marymount*		UFCU Disch–Falk Field • Austin, TX	Cancelled (rain)								
March 10	7:00 PM	Loyola Marymount*		UFCU Disch–Falk Field • Austin, TX	Postponned (rain)								
March 11	12:00 PM	Loyola Marymount*		UFCU Disch–Falk Field • Austin, TX	**L** 0–1	Griffin (2–2)	**Milner** **(1–3)**	—		5–8	—	Box Score	Recap
March 11	2:30 PM	Loyola Marymount*		UFCU Disch–Falk Field • Austin, TX	**W** 3–1 ^{7}	**Jacquez** **(1–1)**	Megill (0–4)	**Knebel** **(4)**	5,568	6–8	—	Box Score	Recap
March 13	6:00 PM	No. 30 Texas State*		UFCU Disch–Falk Field • Austin, TX	**W** 6–1	**French** **(2–0)**	Head (0–1)	—	7,748	7–8	—	Box Score	Recap
March 16	6:30 PM	at No. 21 Oklahoma		L. Dale Mitchell Baseball Park • Norman, OK	**W** 7–6 ^{12}	**Milner** **(2–3)**	John (3–3)	**French** **(2)**	1,895	8–8	1–0	Box Score	Recap
March 17	2:00 PM	at No. 21 Oklahoma		L. Dale Mitchell Baseball Park • Norman, OK	**W** 9–5	**Milner** **(3–3)**	Gray (2–3)	—	2,332	9–8	2–0	Box Score	Recap
March 18	1:00 PM	at No. 21 Oklahoma		L. Dale Mitchell Baseball Park • Norman, OK	**W** 9–4	**French** **(3–0)**	Okert (2–2)	**Curtiss** **(1)**	1,184	10–8	3–0	Box Score	Recap
March 20	6:00 PM	Stephen F. Austin*	No. 21	UFCU Disch–Falk Field • Austin, TX	**W** 9–1	**D. Peters** **(1–0)**	Higginbotham (2–1)	—	5,481	11–8	—	Box Score	Recap
March 23	6:30 PM	at Kansas State	No. 21	Tointon Family Stadium • Manhattan, KS	**L** 2–5	Applegate (2–2)	**Thornhill** **(2–2)**	Williams (2)	1,232	11–9	3–1	Box Score	Recap
March 24	2:00 PM	at Kansas State	No. 21	Tointon Family Stadium • Manhattan, KS	**W** 6–4 ^{11}	**Knebel** **(2–0)**	Williams (0–1)	—	1,462	12–9	4–1	Box Score	Recap
March 25	1:00 PM	at Kansas State	No. 21	Tointon Family Stadium • Manhattan, KS	**W** 8–5	**Milner** **(4–3)**	Youngdahl (0–1)	**Knebel** **(5)**	1,259	13–9	5–1	Box Score	Recap
March 28	6:00 PM	UT Pan American*	No. 19	UFCU Disch–Falk Field • Austin, TX	**W** 9–5	**Milner** **(5–3)**	Badura (1–1)	—	5,828	14–9	—	Box Score	Recap
March 30	7:00 PM	California*	No. 19	Dell Diamond • Round Rock, TX	**W** 13–3	**Thornhill** **(3–2)**	Jones (2–4)	—	2,970	15–9	—	Box Score	Recap
March 31	4:00 PM	California*	No. 19	Dell Diamond • Round Rock, TX	**L** 2–12	Flemer (4–2)	**French** **(3–1)**	—	3,582	15–10	—	Box Score	Recap

April (10–6)
Date	Time (CT)	Opponent	Rank	Stadium	Score	Win	Loss	Save	Attendance	Overall record	Big 12 Record	Box Score	Recap
April 1	1:00 PM	California*	No. 19	Dell Diamond • Round Rock, TX	**L** 5–6	Donofrio (3–0)	**Milner** **(5–4)**	Scott (6)	2,028	15–11	—	Box Score	Recap
April 5	6:30 PM	at Texas Tech	No. 25	Dan Law Field at Rip Griffin Park • Lubbock, TX	**W** 7–4	**Thornhill** **(4–2)**	Stewart (0–1)	**Knebel** **(6)**	3,216	16–11	6–1	Box Score	Recap
April 6	6:30 PM	at Texas Tech	No. 25	Dan Law Field at Rip Griffin Park • Lubbock, TX	**L** 6–7 ^{14}	Parten (1–0)	**Knebel** **(2–1)**	—	4,281	16–12	6–2	Box Score	Recap
April 7	2:00 PM	at Texas Tech	No. 25	Dan Law Field at Rip Griffin Park • Lubbock, TX	**W** 14–3	**Jacquez** **(2–1)**	Neely (2–4)	**Curtiss** **(2)**	4,212	17–12	7–2	Box Score	Recap
April 10	6:00 PM	Texas A&M-Corpus Christi*	No. 25	UFCU Disch–Falk Field • Austin, TX	**W** 9–2	**D. Peters** **(2–0)**	Dziubczynski (0–3)	**Milner** **(1)**	6,097	18–12	—	Box Score	Recap
April 13	6:00 PM	Oklahoma State	No. 25	UFCU Disch–Falk Field • Austin, TX	**L** 1–3 ^{11}	Barnes (3–3)	**Knebel** **(2–2)**	—	6,808	18–13	7–3	Box Score	Recap
April 14	1:00 PM	Oklahoma State	No. 25	UFCU Disch–Falk Field • Austin, TX	**W** 5–0	**French** **(4–1)**	Ottoson (2–5)	—	6,478	19–13	8–3	Box Score	Recap
April 14	4:00 PM	Oklahoma State	No. 25	UFCU Disch–Falk Field • Austin, TX	**W** 3–2	**D. Peters** **(3–0)**	Wheeland (2–1)	**Milner** **(2)**	6,888	20–13	9–3	Box Score	Recap
April 17	6:00 PM	Texas State*	No. 23	UFCU Disch–Falk Field • Austin, TX	**W** 2–0	**Curtiss** **(1–2)**	Black (2–1)	**Knebel** **(7)**	6,917	21–13	—	Box Score	Recap
April 20	7:00 PM	Kansas	No. 23	UFCU Disch–Falk Field • Austin, TX	**L** 2–7	Duncan (4–5)	**Thornhill** **(4–3)**	—	6,256	21–14	9–4	Box Score	Recap
April 21	7:00 PM	Kansas	No. 23	UFCU Disch–Falk Field • Austin, TX	**W** 3–0	**French** **(5–1)**	Benjamin (2–5)	—	7,308	22–14	10–4	Box Score	Recap
April 22	1:00 PM	Kansas	No. 23	UFCU Disch–Falk Field • Austin, TX	**W** 7–2	**Milner** **(6–4)**	Taylor (4–5)	—	6,451	23–14	11–4	Box Score	Recap
April 24	6:00 PM	Central Arkansas*	No. 18	UFCU Disch–Falk Field • Austin, TX	**W** 4–2	**Curtiss** **(2–2)**	Biggerstaff (1–4)	**Knebel** **(8)**	5,480	24–14	—	Box Score	Recap
April 27	6:30 PM	at No. 14 Texas A&M	No. 18	Olsen Field at Blue Bell Park • College Station, TX	**L** 5–6	Wacha (6–0)	**Thornhill** **(4–4)**	—	6,944	24–15	11–5	Box Score	Recap
April 28	2:30 PM	No. 14 Texas A&M	No. 18	UFCU Disch–Falk Field • Austin, TX	**L** 4–12	Stripling (7–2)	**French** **(5–2)**	—	7,716	24–16	11–6	Box Score	Recap
April 29	2:00 PM	No. 14 Texas A&M	No. 18	UFCU Disch–Falk Field • Austin, TX	**W** 2–1	**Knebel** **(3–2)**	Martin (5–4)	—	7,741	25–16	12–6	Box Score	Recap

May (5–4)
Date	Time (CT)	Opponent	Rank	Stadium	Score	Win	Loss	Save	Attendance	Overall record	Big 12 Record	Box Score	Recap
May 1	6:00 PM	Prairie View A&M	No. 20	UFCU Disch–Falk Field • Austin, TX	**W** 5–2	**Dicharry** **(1–1)**	Hollis (1–5)	**Milner** **(3)**	5,371	26–16	13–6	Box Score	Recap
May 4	6:00 PM	at Missouri	No. 20	Taylor Stadium • Columbia, MO	**W** 6–4	**French** **(6–2)**	Zastryzny (4–3)	**Knebel** **(9)**	1,387	27–16	14–6	Box Score	Recap
May 5	1:00 PM	at Missouri	No. 20	Taylor Stadium • Columbia, MO	**L** 4–5	Ross (2–0)	**Thornhill** **(4–5)**	—	2,210	27–17	14–7	Box Score	Recap
May 6	1:00 PM	at Missouri	No. 20	Taylor Stadium • Columbia, MO	**L** 6–7 ^{11}	Graves (4–5)	**Knebel** **(3–3)**	—	1,144	27–18	14–8	Box Score	Recap
May 12	1:00 PM	Texas Southern*	No. 24	UFCU Disch–Falk Field • Austin, TX	**W** 3–0 ^{7}	**Knebel** **(4–3)**	Flores (2–5)	—		28–18	—	Box Score	Recap
May 12	3:30 PM	Texas Southern*	No. 24	UFCU Disch–Falk Field • Austin, TX	**W** 12–3	**D. Peters** **(4–0)**	Bass (1–2)	—	6,397	29–18	—	Box Score	Recap
May 17	6:30 PM	at No. 7 Baylor	No. 21	Baylor Ballpark • Waco, TX	**L** 5–16	Turley (8–0)	**D. Peters** **(4–1)**	—	4,889	29–19	14–9	Box Score	Recap
May 18	6:30 PM	No. 7 Baylor	No. 21	UFCU Disch–Falk Field • Austin, TX	**L** 0–4	Blank (10–1)	**Knebel** **(4–4)**	Bare (1)	6,645	29–20	14–10	Box Score	Recap
May 19	2:00 PM	No. 7 Baylor	No. 21	UFCU Disch–Falk Field • Austin, TX	**W** 2–1	**Milner** **(7–4)**	Smith (3–1)	—	6,475	30–20	15–10	Box Score	Recap

Postseason (0–2)

Big 12 Tournament (0–2)
Date	Time (CT)	Opponent	Seed	Stadium	Score	Win	Loss	Save	Attendance	Overall record	Tournament record	Box Score	Recap
May 23	7:30 PM	vs. (6) Missouri	3	Chickasaw Bricktown Ballpark • Oklahoma City, OK	**L** 0–5	Zastryzny (5–5)	**Knebel** **(4–5)**	—	3,853	30–21	0–1	Box Score	Recap
May 24	12:30 PM	vs. (7) Kansas	3	Chickasaw Bricktown Ballpark • Oklahoma City, OK	**L** 2–4	Benjamin (5–7)	**Curtiss** **(2–3)**	Kahana (2)	3,507	30–22	0–2	Box Score	Recap

* indicates a non-conference game. All rankings from Collegiate Baseball on the date of the contest.

== Rankings ==
Ranking movements Legend: ██ Increase in ranking ██ Decrease in ranking
	Week																		
Poll	Pre	1	2	3	4	5	6	7	8	9	10	11	12	13	14	15	16	17	Final
Coaches'	5	5*	16			25	25		25	24	24	24	25						
Baseball America	13	12	21			22	18	25	23	23	20	25							
Collegiate Baseball^	5	7				21	19	25	25	23	18	20	24	21	22				
NCBWA†	7	9	18	25	30	25	23	27	25	25	24	27	28	27					

^ Collegiate Baseball ranked 40 teams in their preseason poll, but only ranked 30 teams weekly during the season.
† NCBWA ranks 30 teams in their preseason poll, but only ranks 25 teams weekly during the season.
* A new poll was not released for this week, so for comparison purposes, the previous week's ranking is inserted in this week's slot.
