= 2012 Big 12 Conference baseball tournament =

American college baseball tournament

- 2012 Big 12 baseball tournament logo
- Teams: 8
- Format: Two four team Double Elimination; Brackets with one game championship
- Finals site: Chickasaw Bricktown Ballpark; Oklahoma City, OK
- Champions: Missouri (1st title)
- Winning coach: Tim Jamieson (1st title)
- MVP: Eric Garcia (Missouri)

2012 Big 12 Conference baseball standings
	Conf.				Overall
Team	W		L	PCT	W		L	PCT
No. 10 Baylor ‍†‍‍^{y}	20	–	4	.833	49	–	17	.742
No. 19 Texas A&M ‍‍‍^{y}	16	–	8	.667	43	–	18	.705
Texas ‍‍‍	14	–	10	.583	30	–	22	.577
No. 13 Oklahoma ‍‍‍^{y}	13	–	10	.565	42	–	25	.627
Oklahoma State ‍‍‍	13	–	11	.542	32	–	25	.561
Missouri ‍‍‡‍^{y}	10	–	14	.417	33	–	28	.541
Kansas ‍‍‍	7	–	16	.304	24	–	34	.414
Kansas State ‍‍‍	7	–	17	.292	27	–	31	.466
Texas Tech ‍‍‍	7	–	17	.292	29	–	26	.527
† – Conference champion ‡ – Tournament champion y – Invited to the NCAA tournament Rankings from Collegiate Baseball

The 2012 Big 12 Conference baseball tournament was held at Chickasaw Bricktown Ballpark in Oklahoma City, OK from May 23 to May 27, 2012. The tournament continued the format reinstated with the 2011 tournament, consisting of two separate four-team double-elimination tournaments. The winners of each of those tournaments faced each other in a one-game match for the championship. Missouri defeated Oklahoma in the championship game, 8-7, to earn the Big 12 Conference's automatic bid to the 2012 NCAA Division I baseball tournament.

It was Missouri's first, and only, Big 12 Conference Baseball Tournament title, as they moved to the SEC on July 1, 2012.

== Format and seeding ==
The top eight teams (based on conference results) from the conference earn invites to the tournament.

Place	Seed	Team	Conference				Overall		
Place	Seed	Team	W	L	%	GB	W	L	%
1	1	Baylor	20	4	.833	–	49	17	.742
2	2	Texas A&M	16	8	.667	4	43	18	.705
3	3	Texas	14	10	.583	6	30	22	.577
4	4	Oklahoma	13	10	.565	6.5	42	25	.627
5	5	Oklahoma State	13	11	.542	7	32	25	.561
6	6	Missouri	10	14	.417	10	33	28	.541
7	7	Kansas	7	16	.304	12.5	24	34	.414
8	8	Kansas State	7	17	.292	13	27	31	.466
8	–	Texas Tech	7	17	.292	13	29	26	.527

== Bracket ==
First round
5	Oklahoma State	0
4	Oklahoma	1
8	Kansas State	1
1	Baylor	11
5	Oklahoma State	5
8	Kansas State	11
6	Missouri	5
3	Texas	0
7	Kansas	4
2	Texas A&M	10
3	Texas	2
7	Kansas	4

Second round
4	Oklahoma	3
1	Baylor	2
8	Kansas State	2
1	Baylor	11
2	Texas A&M	3
6	Missouri	5
7	Kansas	5
2	Texas A&M	3

Semifinals
4	Oklahoma	7	-
1	Baylor	2	-
6	Missouri	12	-
7	Kansas	2	-

Final
4	Oklahoma	7
6	Missouri	8

== All-Tournament Team ==
Position	Player	School
C	Josh Ludy	Baylor
1B	Evan Mistich	Oklahoma
2B	Jack Mayfield	Oklahoma
SS	Eric Garcia	Missouri
3B	Matt Juengel	Texas A&M
OF	Dane Opel	Missouri
OF	Blake Brown	Missouri
OF	Tyler Naquin	Texas A&M
DH	Matt Oberste	Oklahoma
P	Dillon Overton	Oklahoma
P	Steven Okert	Oklahoma
P	Jeff Emens	Missouri
MOP	Eric Garcia	Missouri
