= 2012 Missouri Valley Conference baseball tournament =

- Teams: 8
- Format: Double-elimination
- Finals site: Hammons Field; Springfield, MO
- Champions: Creighton (3rd title)
- Winning coach: Ed Servais (3rd title)
- MVP: Mike Gerber (Creighton)
- Television: ESPN3

2012 Missouri Valley Conference baseball standings
	Conf.						Overall
Team	W		L		T	PCT	W		L		T	PCT
Indiana State ‍†‍‍^{y}	14	–	7	–	0	.667	41	–	17	–	0	.707
Missouri State ‍‍‍^{y}	13	–	7	–	0	.650	39	–	20	–	0	.661
Wichita State ‍‍‍	12	–	9	–	0	.571	35	–	25	–	0	.583
Illinois State ‍‍‍	10	–	9	–	0	.526	33	–	19	–	0	.635
Evansville ‍‍‍	10	–	11	–	0	.476	32	–	27	–	0	.542
Southern Illinois ‍‍‍	9	–	12	–	0	.429	31	–	28	–	0	.525
Bradley ‍‍‍	8	–	13	–	0	.381	27	–	27	–	1	.500
Creighton ‍‍‡‍^{y}	6	–	14	–	0	.300	26	–	28	–	0	.481
† – Conference champion ‡ – Tournament champion y – Invited to the 2012 NCAA Division I baseball tournament As of May 31, 2012; Rankings from Coaches' Poll

The 2012 Missouri Valley Conference baseball tournament took place from May 22 through 26. All eight teams met in the double-elimination tournament held at Missouri State's Hammons Field in Springfield, MO. Creighton won their third tournament championship and second in a row and earned the conference's automatic bid to the 2012 NCAA Division I baseball tournament.

== Seeding and format ==
The league's eight teams were seeded based on conference winning percentage. They then played a two bracket, double-elimination format tournament, with the winner of each bracket then playing a single elimination final.

Team	W	L	PCT	GB	Seed
Indiana State	14	7	.667	–	1
Missouri State	13	7	.650	1	2
Wichita State	12	9	.571	2	3
Illinois State	10	9	.526	3	4
Evansville	10	11	.476	4	5
Southern Illinois	9	12	.429	5	6
Bradley	8	13	.381	6	7
Creighton	6	14	.300	7.5	8

== Results ==
First round
5	Evansville	3
4	Illinois State	10
8	Creighton	5
1	Indiana State	0
1	Indiana State	5
5	Evansville	8
6	Southern Illinois	6
3	Wichita State	3
7	Bradley	5
2	Missouri State	3
3	Wichita State	0
2	Missouri State	7

Second round
4	Illinois State	5
8	Creighton	11
4	Illinois State	5*
5	Evansville	4
6	Southern Illinois	9*
7	Bradley	8
7	Bradley	8
2	Missouri State	11*

Semifinals
8	Creighton	10	-
4	Illinois State	3	-
6	Southern Illinois	3*	-
2	Missouri State	2	-

Final
8	Creighton	8
6	Southern Illinois	6

== All-Tournament Team ==
The following players were named to the All-Tournament Team.

POS	Name	School
1B	Chris Serritella	Southern Illinois
2B	Jake Peter	Creighton
SS	Eric Cheray	Missouri State
3B	Chance Ross	Creighton
C	Brian Bajer	Southern Illinois
UT	Nick Judkins	Creighton
DH	Keenen Maddox	Missouri State
OF	Mike Gerber	Creighton
OF	Chad Hinshaw	Illinois State
OF	Brennan Murphy	Creighton
P	Todd Eaton	Southern Illinois
P	Cody Schumacher	Missouri State

=== Most Outstanding Player ===
Mike Gerber was named Most Outstanding Player. Gerber was an outfielder for Creighton.
