= Dan Spencer =

American baseball player and coach (born 1965)

Current position
- Title: Head coach
- Team: Linfield University
- Conference: Northwest Conference

Biographical details
- Born: September 10, 1965 (age 61); Vancouver, Washington, U.S.
- Education: Portland State University (1990)

Playing career
- 1984: MiraCosta College
- 1985–1987: Texas Tech

Coaching career (HC unless noted)
- 1991: Tacoma CC (assistant)
- 1992–1996: Green River CC
- 1997–2003: Oregon State (assistant)
- 2004–2007: Oregon State (assoc.)
- 2008: Texas Tech (assoc.)
- 2009–2012: Texas Tech
- 2013–2015: New Mexico (assistant)
- 2016–2019: Washington State (assistant)
- 2020–present: Linfield College

Head coaching record
- Overall: 115–112 (college); 131–67 (junior college)

Dan Spencer (born September 10, 1965) is an American college baseball coach. He currently serves as the head coach for the Linfield College Wildcats. He previously served as head coach at Green River Community College (1992–1996), Oregon State University (1996-2007), and Texas Tech University (2007–2012). He also served as the pitching coach for University of New Mexico and associate head coach/pitching coach for Washington State University.

== Coaching career ==
=== Oregon State ===
Spencer coached at Oregon State for eleven seasons. During his last three years, he was the associate head coach and served as pitching/catching coach and recruiting coordinator. His final two seasons at Oregon State saw the Beavers become the first back-to-back College World Series Champions since LSU accomplished the feat in the late 1990s.

=== Texas Tech ===
On July 2, 2007, Spencer was hired as the associate head coach at Texas Tech. In October 2008, Spencer was named the 2007 Collegiate Baseball Magazine National College Pitching Coach of the Year. On April 29, 2008, Texas Tech Athletic Director Gerald Myers designated Spencer to become the head coach of the team once former head coach Larry Hays retired. On June 13, 2008, it was formally announced that Spencer would succeed Larry Hays as head coach at Texas Tech after Hays had announced his retirement a few days earlier.

=== New Mexico ===
In July 2012, Spencer was hired as the pitching coach at New Mexico.

=== Washington State ===
In June 2015, after the recent hire of new head coach Marty Lees, Spencer was hired as the pitching coach and associate head coach with the Washington State Cougars.

=== Linfield College ===
On June 19, 2019, Spencer was hired as the head baseball coach at Linfield College, an NCAA Division III program.

== Head coaching record ==
Record table
Season	Team	Overall	Conference	Standing	Postseason
Green River Gators (Northwest Athletic Association of Community Colleges) (1992–1996)
1992	Green River				
1993	Green River				
1994	Green River				
1995	Green River				
1996	Green River				
Green River:		131–67			
Texas Tech Red Raiders (Big 12 Conference) (2009–2012)
2009	Texas Tech	25–32	12–15	7th	
2010	Texas Tech	28–29	13–14	5th	
2011	Texas Tech	33–25	12–15	7th	
2012	Texas Tech	29–26	7–17	T–8th	
Texas Tech:		115–112	44–61		
Total:		246–179			
National champion Postseason invitational champion Conference regular season champion Conference regular season and conference tournament champion Division regular season champion Division regular season and conference tournament champion Conference tournament champion
