= Jim Horner =

American baseball player and coach (born 1973)

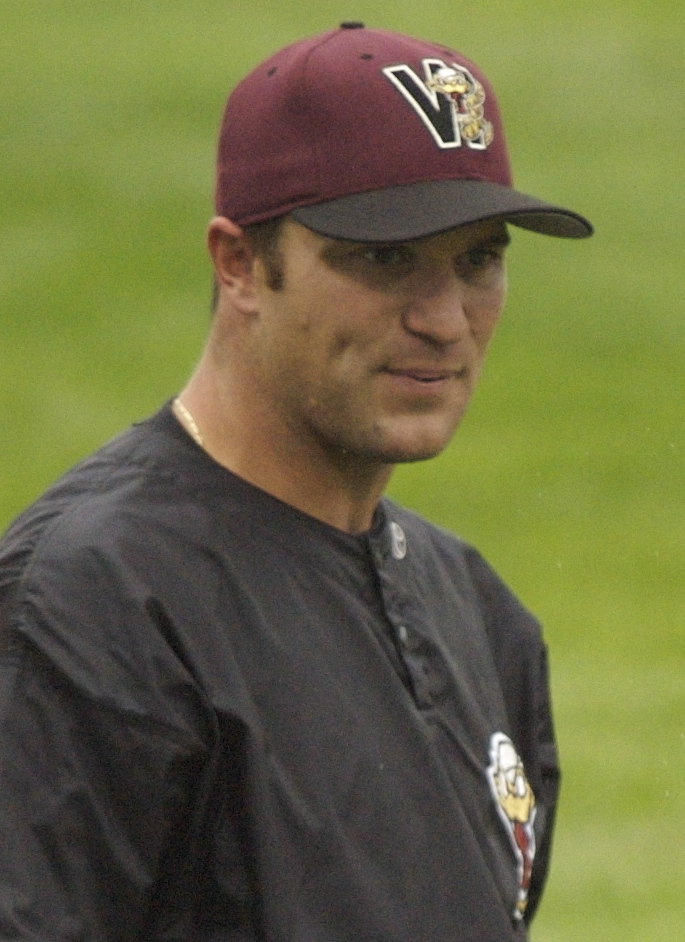
- Horner with the Wisconsin Timber Rattlers

Biographical details
- Born: November 11, 1973 (age 52); Snoqualmie, Washington

Playing career
- 1993–1996: Washington State
- 1996: Everett AquaSox
- 1997: Lancaster JetHawks
- 1997: Wisconsin Timber Rattlers
- 1998: Orlando Rays
- 1999–2000: New Haven Ravens
- 2001–2004: Tacoma Rainiers
- 2002–2004: San Antonio Missions
- 2003: Peoria Javelinas
- Position: Catcher

Coaching career (HC unless noted)
- 2006–2007: Wisconsin Timber Rattlers
- 2008–2010: High Desert Mavericks
- 2011–2012: Texas Tech (assistant)
- 2013: High Desert Mavericks
- 2014–2015: Jackson Generals
- 2016–2019: Washington State (assistant)

James Patrick Horner (born November 11, 1973) is an American professional baseball manager and a former minor league baseball player. He was previously the pilot of the Class A Wisconsin Timber Rattlers (2006–2007), High Desert Mavericks (2008–2010; 2013) and Class AA Jackson Generals (2014-2015) all Seattle Mariners affiliates.

He was an assistant coach for the Washington State Cougars baseball team from 2016 to 2019.

== Professional playing career ==
The 6 ft (1.8 m), 210 lb (95 kg) Horner had a nine-year playing career, all within the Mariners' minor leagues, as a catcher from 1996 to 2004. The highest level of the minors Horner reached was Triple-A in 2000 with the Tacoma Rainiers. In his nine-year career Horner batted .259 with 116 doubles, six triples, 59 home runs and 298 runs batted in. He threw and batted right-handed.

== Managerial career ==
Horner led the 2009 Mavericks to an 83–57 (.593) record, winning the first- and second-half California League South Division titles. He was named the league's Manager of the Year. On July 30, 2010, he resigned as High Desert's manager to become assistant baseball coach of Texas Tech University, serving through the 2012 campaign. He then returned to the Mavericks in 2013; he is the winningest manager in the franchise's 23-year history.

As of the start of the 2014 season, his six-year win–loss record as a skipper was 369–434 (.460).

In 2026, Horner was named as manager for the FCL Pirates the rookie-level affiliate of the Pittsburgh Pirates.

Sporting positions
Preceded by Jim Pankovits	Jackson Generals manager 2014–2015	Succeeded by Daren Brown
