= George S. Erath Field at Coy O. Williard Baseball Stadium =

Baseball venue in North Carolina, US

- Interactive map of George S. Erath Field at Coy O. Williard Baseball Stadium
- Location: 1013 North College Drive, High Point, North Carolina, US
- Coordinates: 35°58′32″N 79°59′44″W
- Owner: High Point University
- Operator: High Point University
- Capacity: 550
- Surface: Natural grass
- Scoreboard: Electronic

Construction
- Renovated: 2001, 2007, 2009, 2010

Tenants
- High Point Panthers baseball (NCAA DI Big South); Big South Tournament (2012)

George S. Erath Field at Coy O. Williard Baseball Stadium is a baseball venue in High Point, North Carolina, United States. It is home to the High Point Panthers baseball team of the NCAA Division I Big South Conference. It has a capacity of 550 spectators.

Originally known simply as George S. Erath Field, the venue was renamed George S. Erath Field at Coy O. Williard Baseball Stadium in 2007, following the construction of a seating structure with 501 chairback seats, a press box, concessions, and restrooms. In 2009, a FieldTurf halo was added around home plate, and the warning track was renovated. In 2010, the right center field fence was lowered to allow for better spectator sightlines. Additionally, an irrigation system and scoreboard have been added since 2001, and the infield has been renovated.

The venue hosted the 2012 Big South Conference baseball tournament, won by Coastal Carolina.

In 2012, college baseball writer Eric Sorenson ranked the facility the fourth best small venue in Division I baseball.

== See also ==
- List of NCAA Division I baseball venues
