= 2012 St. John's Red Storm baseball team =

American college baseball season

2012 St. John's Red Storm baseball

Big East tournament Champion Big East Conference Champion Chapel Hill Regional Champion

Tucson Super Regional, L 2–0 Arizona
- Conference: Big East Conference (1979–2013)
- Record: 40–23 (18–9 Big East)
- Head coach: Ed Blankmeyer (17th season)
- Assistant coaches: Mike Hampton (11th season); Scott Brown (9th season); Brendan Monaghan (2nd season)
- Home stadium: Jack Kaiser Stadium

2012 Big East Conference baseball standings
	Conf.						Overall
Team	W		L		T	PCT	W		L		T	PCT
#25 Louisville †^{y} ‍‍‍	18	–	9	–	0	.667	42	–	22	–	0	.656
St. John's ‍†‍‡‍^{y}	18	–	9	–	0	.667	40	–	23	–	0	.635
Seton Hall ‍‍‍	17	–	10	–	0	.630	34	–	24	–	0	.586
South Florida ‍‍‍	17	–	10	–	0	.630	38	–	22	–	0	.633
Connecticut ‍‍‍	16	–	11	–	0	.593	31	–	27	–	1	.534
Rutgers ‍‍‍	16	–	11	–	0	.593	31	–	25	–	0	.554
Notre Dame ‍‍‍	14	–	13	–	0	.519	31	–	27	–	0	.534
Pittsburgh ‍‍‍	10	–	17	–	0	.370	28	–	28	–	0	.500
Georgetown ‍‍‍	10	–	17	–	0	.370	24	–	29	–	0	.453
Villanova ‍‍‍	10	–	17	–	0	.370	28	–	27	–	0	.509
West Virginia ‍‍‍	9	–	18	–	0	.333	23	–	32	–	0	.418
Cincinnati ‍‍‍	7	–	20	–	0	.259	18	–	38	–	0	.321
† – Conference champion ‡ – Tournament champion y – Invited to the NCAA tournament As of June 15, 2012; Rankings from Coaches' Poll

The 2012 St. John's Red Storm baseball team represented St. John's University in the 2012 NCAA Division I baseball season. The Red Storm were coached by seventeenth year head coach Ed Blankmeyer and played their home games at Jack Kaiser Stadium.

St. John's claimed the Big East Conference regular season and Tournament championships, and also swept through the Chapel Hill Regional. The Red Storm fell to eventual champion Arizona in the Tucson Super Regional, by scores of 7–6 (10 innings) and 7–4.

== Roster ==
2012 St. John's Red Storm baseball team
Players
Coaches

#	Pos.	Name	B/T	Height	Weight	Year	Home town
0	INF	Matt Wessinger	R/R	6 ft 0 in (1.83 m)	180 lb (82 kg)	Sr	Liverpool, NY
2	INF	Anthony Iacomini	R/R	5 ft 9 in (1.75 m)	185 lb (84 kg)	RS So	North Salem, NY
3	INF	Sean O'Hare	S/R	6 ft 0 in (1.83 m)	190 lb (86 kg)	Jr	Morristown, NJ
4	INF	Pat Talbut	R/R	6 ft 2 in (1.88 m)	180 lb (82 kg)	Jr	Vestal, NY
5	C	Frank Schwindel	R/R	6 ft 1 in (1.85 m)	195 lb (88 kg)	So	Livingston, NJ
6	C	Dan Roland	R/R	5 ft 10 in (1.78 m)	185 lb (84 kg)	RS Fr	Upper Brookville, NY
7	OF	Martin Kelly	R/R	5 ft 11 in (1.8 m)	185 lb (84 kg)	RS So	Pompton Plains, NJ
8	INF	Bret Dennis	R/R	6 ft 1 in (1.85 m)	180 lb (82 kg)	Fr	Burnt Hills, NY
9	C	Vincent Tranchina	R/R	6 ft 1 in (1.85 m)	195 lb (88 kg)	Fr	Manasquan, NJ
10	OF	Kyle Richardson	R/R	5 ft 9 in (1.75 m)	165 lb (75 kg)	Sr	Rome, NY
11	RHP	Matt Carasiti	R/R	6 ft 3 in (1.91 m)	200 lb (91 kg)	Jr	Berlin, CT
12	RHP	Eddie Medina	L/R	6 ft 2 in (1.88 m)	180 lb (82 kg)	Sr	Staten Island, NY
13	INF	Zach Lauricella	R/R	5 ft 10 in (1.78 m)	190 lb (86 kg)	Fr	Buffalo, NY
14	INF	Kyle Lombardo	R/R	6 ft 2 in (1.88 m)	190 lb (86 kg)	So	Setauket, NY
16	RHP	Jerome Werniuk	R/R	6 ft 5 in (1.96 m)	220 lb (100 kg)	Jr	Toronto, ON, Canada
17	RHP	Collin Dinges	R/R	5 ft 11 in (1.8 m)	175 lb (79 kg)	Fr	Poughquag, NY
18	OF	Jeremy Baltz	R/R	6 ft 3 in (1.91 m)	205 lb (93 kg)	Jr	Vestal, NY
20	LHP	Ryan Horstman	L/L	6 ft 2 in (1.88 m)	185 lb (84 kg)	Fr	South Hadley, MA
22	RHP	Stephen Rivera	R/R	6 ft 1 in (1.85 m)	205 lb (93 kg)	Sr	Staten Island, NY
23	OF	Kevin Grove	R/R	6 ft 4 in (1.93 m)	215 lb (98 kg)	RS So	Manhattan Beach, CA
24	OF	Jimmy Brennan	L/L	6 ft 0 in (1.83 m)	190 lb (86 kg)	Jr	Airmont, NY
26	C	Danny Bethea	R/R	6 ft 1 in (1.85 m)	215 lb (98 kg)	Jr	San Diego, CA
27	OF	Julien Plana	L/L	5 ft 8 in (1.73 m)	165 lb (75 kg)	Fr	Miami, FL
29	C	Robert Case	R/R	6 ft 2 in (1.88 m)	200 lb (91 kg)	Jr	Miami, FL
30	LHP	Sean Hagan	L/L	6 ft 6 in (1.98 m)	225 lb (102 kg)	Jr	Larchmont, NY
31	INF	Shawn Heide	R/R	6 ft 3 in (1.91 m)	205 lb (93 kg)	Fr	Medfield, MA
32	RHP	Anthony Cervone	R/R	6 ft 4 in (1.93 m)	235 lb (107 kg)	Jr	Beacon, NY
33	INF	Eric Peterson	R/R	6 ft 4 in (1.93 m)	190 lb (86 kg)	Fr	Allamuchy, NJ
34	LHP	Brendan Lobban	L/L	6 ft 3 in (1.91 m)	220 lb (100 kg)	Sr	Ramsey, NJ
35	RHP	Kyle Turner	R/R	6 ft 2 in (1.88 m)	200 lb (91 kg)	Fr	Nashua, NH
38	LHP	Jake Woodward	L/L	6 ft 4 in (1.93 m)	190 lb (86 kg)	So	Lebanon, NH
39	RHP	Brad Bellinger	R/R	6 ft 4 in (1.93 m)	200 lb (91 kg)	Fr	Pine City, NY
40	RHP	James Lomangino	R/R	6 ft 0 in (1.83 m)	205 lb (93 kg)	RS So	Ronkonkoma, NY
44	LHP	Kevin Kilpatrick	L/L	6 ft 2 in (1.88 m)	195 lb (88 kg)	Sr	College Point, NY
58	RHP	Kyle Hanse	R/R	6 ft 8 in (2.03 m)	215 lb (98 kg)	Jr	Glen Cove, NY

Head coach

Ed Blankmeyer

Assistant coach(es)

Mike Hampton
Brendan Monaghan

Pitching coach(es)

Scott Brown

Legend

- (C) Team captain
- (S) Suspended
- (I) Ineligible
- Injured
- Current redshirt

Roster
Last update: 2012-06-27

== Rankings ==
Ranking movements Legend: ██ Increase in ranking ██ Decrease in ranking
	Week																		
Poll	Pre	1	2	3	4	5	6	7	8	9	10	11	12	13	14	15	16	17	Final
Coaches'	21	21*																	
Baseball America																			
Collegiate Baseball^	11	18										30	20	26		29	14	16	
NCBWA†	27																20	17	

^ Collegiate Baseball ranked 40 teams in their preseason poll, but only ranked 30 teams weekly during the season.
† NCBWA ranks 30 teams in their preseason poll, but only ranks 25 teams weekly during the season.
* A new poll was not released for this week, so for comparison purposes, the previous week's ranking is inserted in this week's slot.
