= 2012 NCAA Division I baseball rankings =

2012 NCAA Division I baseball season
- Duration: February 17, 2012–June 26, 2012
- Number of teams: 297
- Preseason No. 1: Florida Gators

Tournament
- Duration: June 1–25, 2012

College World Series
- Champions: Arizona (4th title)
- Runners-up: South Carolina
- MOP: Robert Refsnyder (Arizona)

Seasons
- ← 2011 2013 →

The following human polls make up the 2012 NCAA Division I men's baseball rankings. The USA Today/ESPN Coaches Poll is voted on by a panel of 31 Division I baseball coaches. The Baseball America poll is voted on by staff members of the Baseball America magazine. These polls rank the top 25 teams nationally. Collegiate Baseball and the National Collegiate Baseball Writers Association rank the top 30 teams nationally.

== Legend ==
| | Increase in ranking |
| | Decrease in ranking |
| | Not ranked previous week |
| Italics | Number of first place votes |
| (#-#) | Win–loss record |
| т | Tied with team above or below also with this symbol |

== ESPN/USA Today Coaches' Poll ==
| | Preseason Jan 26 | Week 2 Feb 27 | Week 3 Mar 5 | Week 4 Mar 12 | Week 5 Mar 19 | Week 6 Mar 26 | Week 7 Apr 2 | Week 8 Apr 9 | Week 9 Apr 16 | Week 10 Apr 23 | Week 11 Apr 30 | Week 12 May 7 | Week 13 May 14 | Week 14 May 21 | Week 15 May 28 | Week 16 June 27 | |
|---|---|---|---|---|---|---|---|---|---|---|---|---|---|---|---|---|---|
| 1. | Florida | Stanford (7–0) | Florida | Florida | Florida (19–1) | Florida (22–2) | Florida (26–4) | Florida State (27–5) | Florida (28–8) | Florida State (33–7) | Florida State (36–7) | Florida State (39–7) | Florida State (40–10) | Florida State (43–12) | Florida (42–18) | Arizona (48–17) | 1. |
| 2. | South Carolina | Florida (7–1) | Stanford | Stanford | Stanford (13–2) | Stanford (15–2) | Florida State (24–4) | Kentucky (30–3) | Florida State (29–7) | Florida (31–9) | Baylor (38–8) | Baylor (38–8) | South Carolina (38–13) | Florida (40–16) | Baylor (44–14) | South Carolina (49–20) | 2. |
| 3. | Stanford | South Carolina (6–0) | South Carolina | South Carolina | Arkansas (19–2) | Arkansas (22–3) | North Carolina (22–6) | Texas A&M (26–6) | Kentucky (32–5) | Kentucky (35–6) | South Carolina (33–11) | South Carolina (36–12) | Florida (38–14) | Baylor (42–12) | Florida State (43–15) | Arkansas (46–22) | 3. |
| 4. | North Carolina | Rice (8–0) | Rice | North Carolina | Florida State (16–2) | Florida State (21–3) | Kentucky (27–2) | Florida (25–7) | LSU (30–7) | Baylor (35–7) | LSU (35–10) | LSU (38–11) | Baylor (39–11) | South Carolina (39–15) | UCLA (42–14) | Florida State (50–17) | 4. |
| 5. | Texas | Texas A&M (6–1) | Texas A&M | Rice | North Carolina (16–4) | North Carolina (18–5) | Texas A&M (22–6) | Stanford (19–7) | Texas A&M (28–8) | South Carolina (30–11) | Florida (33–12) | Florida (35–13) | Kentucky (41–11) | North Carolina (42–13)т | North Carolina (44–14) | UCLA (48–16) | 5. |
| 6. | Texas A&M | North Carolina (5–1) | Arkansas | Florida State | Kentucky (21–0) | Texas A&M (19–5) | Stanford (16–6) | Miami (24–8) | North Carolina (27–9) | LSU (32–9) | Kentucky (36–9) | Rice (33–13) | North Carolina (38–13) | LSU (42–14)т | South Carolina (40–17) | Florida (47–20) | 6. |
| 7. | Rice | Arkansas (7–1) | North Carolina | Arkansas | Rice (15–8) | Kentucky (24–1) | UCLA (20–5) | LSU (25–7) | UCLA (24–8) | UCF (34–8) | Stanford (28–11) | North Carolina (34–13) | Rice (36–14) | Rice (39–15) | LSU (43–16) | Kent State (47–20) | 7. |
| 8. | Arkansas | Miami (7–0) | Florida State | Texas A&M | South Carolina (15–4) | Miami (19–5) | Arizona (21–7) | North Carolina (23–9) | South Carolina (27–10) | Rice (30–12) | Rice (30–12) | Texas A&M (34–14) | Texas A&M (37–14) | Texas A&M (41–14) | Texas A&M (42–16) | Stony Brook (52–15) | 8. |
| 9. | Florida State | Florida State (6–1) | Georgia Tech | Arizona | Miami (16–4) | UCLA (17–4) | Arkansas (22–6) | Arkansas (24–7) т | Baylor (30–7) | Stanford (25–10) | Texas A&M (31–13) | Kentucky (37–11) | LSU (39–13) | Oregon (41–14) | Rice (40–17) | Baylor (49–17) | 9. |
| 10. | Georgia Tech | Georgia (7–0) | Oregon | Miami | Texas A&M (16–5) | South Carolina (17–7) | South Carolina (20–8) | South Carolina (23–9) т | Stanford (22–9) | North Carolina (29–12) | North Carolina (30–13) | Oregon (34–14) | Oregon (37–14) | UCLA (38–14) | Oregon (42–17) | Oregon (46–19) | 10. |
| 11. | TCU | Georgia Tech (6–2) | Arizona | Cal State Fullerton | Arizona (16–4) | Rice (18–8) | Rice (21–9) | UCLA (21–7) | Oregon (24–10) | UCLA (26–10) | Purdue (34–7) | UCLA (31–13) | UCLA (35–13) | Stanford (36–14) | Arizona (38–17) | LSU (47–18) | 11. |
| 12. | Vanderbilt | Oregon (7–1) | Georgia | UCLA | UCLA (15–4) | Arizona (18–7) | LSU (22–6) | Arizona (23–9) | Miami (25–11) | Texas A&M (28–12) | Oregon (30–13) | Stanford (29–14) | Stanford (32–14) | Kentucky (41–15) | Kentucky (43–16) | Stanford (41–18) | 12. |
| 13. | Miami | Arizona (5–2) | Miami | Oregon | LSU (16–4) | Cal State Fullerton (14–8) | Miami (21–7) | Rice (23–11) | Rice (27–11) | Purdue (31–6) | Arkansas (31–13) | Arkansas (34–15) | Purdue (39–10) | Arizona (36–16) | Stanford (38–16) | NC State (43–20) | 13. |
| 14. | LSU | Virginia (5–1–1) | Cal State Fullerton | Georgia Tech | Georgia Tech (14–6) | LSU (18–6) | UCF (23–6) | Baylor (25–7) | UCF (30–8) | Oregon (27–12) | UCLA (28–12) | Cal State Fullerton (30–14) | Cal State Fullerton (32–15) | Arkansas (39–17)т | Purdue (44–12) | Oklahoma (42–25) | 14. |
| 15. | Oklahoma | Cal State Fullerton (3–3) | LSU | Ole Miss | Cal State Fullerton (12–7) | Louisville (18–6) | Ole Miss (20–8) | UCF (26–7) | Arkansas (25–10) | Cal State Fullerton (26–13) | UCF (35–10) | Purdue (35–9) | NC State (36–13) | NC State (38–15)т | Virginia (38–17–1) | TCU (40–22) | 15. |
| 16. | Cal State Fullerton | Texas (2–5) | UCLA | LSU | Oregon State (14–5) | Oregon (15–6) | Cal State Fullerton (17–10) | Cal State Fullerton (21–10) | Arizona (24–11) | Arizona (26–13) | Arizona (29–13) | UCF (37–11) | UCF (40–12) | Purdue (41–12) | NC State (39–17) | St. John's (40–23) | 16. |
| 17. | Virginia | Louisville (6–1) | Ole Miss | Oklahoma | Georgia (15–6) | UCF (19–6) | Oregon (18–8) | Oregon (20–9) | Purdue (28–5) | Arkansas (28–12) | Cal State Fullerton (26–14) | NC State (33–12) | Arizona (33–15) | UCF (41–14) | Oregon State (38–18) | North Carolina (46–16) | 17. |
| 18. | UCLA | TCU (2–4) | Oklahoma | California | Oregon (13–5) | Georgia (17–6) | Baylor (22–7) | Purdue (24–5) | Cal State Fullerton (23–12) | Miami (26–14) | NC State (30–12) | Arizona (30–15) | Arkansas (35–17) | Cal State Fullerton (33–18) | UCF (43–15) | Texas A&M (43–18) | 18. |
| 19. | Oregon State | Clemson (4–2) | Clemson | Georgia | Ole Miss (15–5) | Oregon State (15–7) | Oregon State (17–8) | Ole Miss (21–10) | NC State (24–10) | Ole Miss (27–13) | Louisville (31–13) | Oregon State (30–15) | Virginia (34–15–1) | Virginia (36–16–1) | Cal State Fullerton (35–19) | Kentucky (45–18) | 19. |
| 20. | Arizona | LSU (5–2) | Louisville | Kentucky | NC State (15–3) | Ole Miss (17–7) | Purdue (20–5) | Louisville (23–9) | San Diego (29–8) | San Diego (31–9) | Oregon State (28–14) | San Diego (36–11) | Oregon State (32–17) | Oregon State (35–18) | Arkansas (39–19) | Rice (41–19) | 20. |
| 21. | St. John's | Baylor (6–2) | California | USC | UCF (16–5) | Georgia Tech (15–9) | Louisville (20–8) | NC State (21–9) | Oregon State (23–11) | Oregon State (26–12) | Miami (27–16) | Miami (30–17) | Miami (32–18) | Miami (34–19) | Miami (36–21) | Purdue (45–14) | 21. |
| 22. | California | Oklahoma (4–2) | Gonzaga | Mississippi State | Louisville (14–6) | NC State (16–5) | NC State (19–7) | San Diego (25–8) | Ole Miss (24–12) | NC State (26–12) | Virginia (30–14–1) | Virginia (31–14–1) | Ole Miss (34–18) | Louisville (38–18) | Mississippi State (39–22) | Oregon State (40–20) | 22. |
| 23. | Clemson | USC (7–0) | Mississippi State | UCF | TCU (11–6) | Baylor (18–7) | Georgia Tech (18–11) | Oregon State (18–11) | Louisville (25–11) | Louisville (28–12) | San Diego (33–11) | Louisville (33–15) | San Diego (38–13) | San Diego (39–13) | San Diego (40–15) | Virginia (39–19–1) | 23. |
| 24. | Louisville | UCLA (4–3) | UCF | Oregon State | Purdue (14–3) | Purdue (16–4) | Georgia (18–11) | Virginia (21–10–1) | Texas (20–13) | Texas (23–14) | Texas (25–16) | Ole Miss (31–18) | Louisville (35–17) | TCU (35–17) | Georgia Tech (36–24) | UCF (45–17) | 24. |
| 25. | Georgia | Ole Miss (106) | Baylor | NC State | Texas (10–8) | Texas (13–9) | San Diego (23–7) | Texas (17–12) | Virginia (23–13–1) | Virginia (26–14–1) т; Sam Houston State (28–11) т | Ole Miss (28–16) | Texas (27–18) | TCU (32–16) | Mississippi State (34–21) | Louisville (39–20) | Vanderbilt (35–28) | 25. |
| | Preseason Jan 26 | Week 2 Feb 27 | Week 3 Mar 5 | Week 4 Mar 12 | Week 5 Mar 19 | Week 6 Mar 26 | Week 7 Apr 2 | Week 8 Apr 9 | Week 9 Apr 16 | Week 10 Apr 23 | Week 11 Apr 30 | Week 12 May 7 | Week 13 May 14 | Week 14 May 21 | Week 15 May 28 | Week 16 June 27 | |
| | | Dropped: 12 Vanderbilt; 19 Oregon State; 21 St. John's; 22 California | Dropped: 14 Virginia (6–4–1); 16 Texas (4–7); 18 TCU (4–6); 23 USC (8–3) | Dropped: 19 Clemson (6–7); 20 Louisville (10–5); 22 Gonzaga (10–3); 25 Baylor (11–6) | Dropped: 17 Oklahoma (11–9); 18 California (11–7); 21 USC (13–6); 22 Mississippi State (15–7) | Dropped: 23 TCU (12–9) | Dropped: 25 Texas (15–11) | Dropped: 23 Georgia Tech; 24 Georgia | None | None | Dropped: 25 Sam Houston State | None | Dropped: 25 Texas | Dropped: 22 Ole Miss | Dropped: 24 TCU (36–19) | Dropped: 19 Cal State Fullerton; 21 Miami; 22 Mississippi State; 23 San Diego; 24 Georgia Tech; 25 Louisville | |

== Baseball America Poll ==
| | Preseason Jan 24 | Week 1 Feb 20 | Week 2 Feb 27 | Week 3 Mar 5 | Week 4 Mar 12 | Week 5 Mar 19 | Week 6 Mar 26 | Week 7 Apr 2 | Week 8 Apr 9 | Week 9 Apr 16 | Week 10 Apr 23 | Week 11 Apr 30 | Week 12 May 7 | Week 13 May 14 | Week 14 May 21 | Week 15 May 28 | Week 16 June 26 | |
|---|---|---|---|---|---|---|---|---|---|---|---|---|---|---|---|---|---|---|
| 1. | Florida | Florida (2–1) | Florida (7–1) | Florida (10–1) | Florida (15–1) | Florida (19–1) | Florida (22–2) | Florida (24–4) | Florida State (27–5) | Florida State (29–7) | Florida State (33–7) | Florida State (36–7) | Florida State (39–7) | Florida State (40–10) | Florida State (43–12) | Florida (42–18) | Arizona (48–17) | 1. |
| 2. | Stanford | Stanford (3–0) | Stanford (7–0) | Stanford (10–1) | Stanford (13–2) | Stanford (13–2) | Stanford (15–2) | Florida State (24–4) | Texas A&M (26–6) | Texas A&M (28–8) | Kentucky (35–6) | Baylor (38–8) | Baylor (38–8) | South Carolina (38–13) | LSU (42–14) | UCLA (42–14) | South Carolina (49–20) | 2. |
| 3. | South Carolina | South Carolina (3–0) | South Carolina (6–0) | South Carolina (9–1) | South Carolina (13–) | Arkansas (19–2) | Arkansas (22–3) | North Carolina (22–6) | Kentucky (30–3) | Kentucky (32–5) | Baylor (35–7) | Kentucky (36–9) | LSU (38–11) | Florida (38–14) | Florida (40–16) | LSU (43–16) | Florida (47–20) | 3. |
| 4. | Arkansas | Arkansas (3–0) | Arkansas (7–1) | Arkansas (11–2) | Arkansas (14–2) | North Carolina (16–4) | Florida State (21–3) | Arizona (21–7) | Arizona (23–9) | LSU (30–7) | LSU (32–9) | LSU (35–10) | South Carolina (36–12) | Kentucky (41–11) | Rice (39–15) | Baylor (44–14) | Florida State (50–17) | 4. |
| 5. | Arizona | Rice (3–0) | Rice (8–0) | Rice (11–1) | North Carolina (13–2) | Arizona (16–4) | North Carolina (18–5) | UCLA (20–5) | LSU (25–7) | Florida (28–8) | Florida (31–9) | South Carolina (33–11) | Rice (33–13) | Rice (36–14) | Oregon (41–14) | Florida State (43–15) | UCLA (48–16) | 5. |
| 6. | Rice | Texas A&M (3–0) | Texas A&M (6–1) | Texas A&M (11–1) | Arizona (13–2) | Florida State (16–2) | UCLA (17–4) | Stanford (16–6) | Stanford (19–7) | Baylor (20–7) | Rice (30–12) | Rice (30–12) | Florida (35–13) | Oregon (37–14) | Baylor (42–12) | North Carolina (44–14) | Arkansas (46–22) | 6. |
| 7. | Texas A&M | LSU (3–0) | Arizona (5–2) | Arizona (8–2) | Florida State (14–1) | UCLA (15–4) | Texas A&M (19–5) | Texas A&M (22–6) | Florida (25–7) | Rice (27–11) | South Carolina (30–11) | Florida (33–12) | Kentucky (37–11) | Baylor (39–11) | South Carolina (39–15) | South Carolina (40–17) | Stony Brook (52–15) | 7. |
| 8. | LSU | Arizona (2–1) | Georgia (7–0) | North Carolina (8–2) | Rice (13–4) | South Carolina (15–4) | Arizona (18–7) | Kentucky (27–2) | Baylor (25–7) | Oregon (24–10) | Cal State Fullerton (26–13) | Cal State Fullerton (26–14) | Cal State Fullerton (30–14) | Cal State Fullerton (32–15) | Texas A&M (41–14) | Rice (40–17) | Kent State (47–20) | 8. |
| 9. | North Carolina | Georgia (3–0) | North Carolina (5–1) | Georgia (10–2) | UCLA (12–3) | Rice (15–6) | Rice (18–8) | Rice (21–9) | Rice (23–11) | South Carolina (27–10) | Texas A&M (28–12) | Texas A&M (31–13) | Oregon (34–14) | LSU (39–13) | UCLA (38–14) | Texas A&M (40–17) | LSU (47–18) | 9. |
| 10. | Vanderbilt | North Carolina (2–1) | Georgia Tech (6–2) | Georgia Tech (10–2) | Texas A&M (13–3) | Texas A&M (16–5) | Kentucky (24–1) | Mississippi (20–8) | South Carolina (23–9) | North Carolina (27–9) | Oregon (27–12) | Oregon (30–13) | Texas A&M (34–14) | Texas A&M (37–14) | North Carolina (42–13) | Oregon (42–17) | Baylor (49–17) | 10. |
| 11. | Georgia | Georgia Tech (3–1) | Arizona State (5–1) | Arizona State (8–2) | Arizona State (10–4) | LSU (16–4) | South Carolina (17–7) | South Carolina (20–8) | Arkansas (24–7) | UCLA (24–8) | Arizona (26–13) | Arizona (29–13) | UCLA (31–13) | UCLA (35–13) | Kentucky (41–15) | Kentucky (43–16) | Oregon (46–19) | 11. |
| 12. | Georgia Tech | Texas (2–1) | Miami (7–0) | Florida State (9–1) | Ole Miss (13–2) | Miami (16–4) | Miami (19–5) | LSU (22–6) | Cal State Fullerton (21–10) | Cal State Fullerton (23–12) | UCLA (26–10) | Stanford (28–11) | North Carolina (34–14) | North Carolina (38–13) | Cal State Fullerton (33–18) | Cal State Fullerton (35–19) | NC State (43–20) | 12. |
| 13. | Texas | Arizona State (3–0) | Florida State (6–1) | LSU (10–2) | LSU (13–3) | Cal State Fullerton (12–7) | Cal State Fullerton (14–8) | Arkansas (22–6) | Miami (24–8) | Arizona (24–11) | Stanford (25–10) | Purdue (34–7) | NC State (33–12) | NC State (36–13) | Arizona (36–16) | Arizona (38–17) | Stanford (41–18) | 13. |
| 14. | UCLA | Miami (3–0) | LSU (5–2) | Ole Miss (9–2) | Miami (12–3) | Arizona State (12–7) | Arizona State (15–8) | Cal State Fullerton (17–10) | North Carolina (23–9) | Stanford (22–9) | UCF (34–8) | UCLA (28–12) | Arizona (30–15) | Arizona (33–15) | Stanford (36–14) | Mississippi State (39–22) | Oklahoma (42–25) | 14. |
| 15. | TCU | TCU (1–1) | Clemson (4–2) | Miami (8–3) | Cal State Fullerton (10–5) | Georgia Tech (14–6) | LSU (18–6) | UCF (23–6) | UCF (26–7) | UCF (30–8) | Purdue (31–6) | UCF (35–10) | Purdue (35–9) | Purdue (39–10) | NC State (38–15) | Purdue (44–12) | St. John's (40–23) | 15. |
| 16. | Clemson | Clemson (2–1) | Ole Miss (5–1) | UCLA (8–3) | Georgia Tech (11–5) | Kentucky (21–0) | Ole Miss (17–7) | Baylor (22–7) | Oregon (20–9) | Purdue (28–5) | North Carolina (29–12) | North Carolina (30–13) | UCF (37–11) | UCF (40–12) | Arizona State (35–18) | Oregon State (38–18) | TCU (40–22) | 16. |
| 17. | Arizona State | Vanderbilt (0–3) | UCLA (4–3) | Oregon (10–1) | Oregon (12–3) | Ole Miss (15–5) | UCF (19–6) | NC State (19–7) | UCLA (21–7) | Arkansas (25–10) | San Diego (31–9) | NC State (30–12) | Stanford (29–14) | Stanford (32–14) | Virginia (36–16) | Virginia (38–17) | North Carolina (46–16) | 17. |
| 18. | Miami | Florida State (3–0) | Oregon (7–1) | UCF (10–2) | Georgia (11–5) | Georgia (15–6) | Texas (13–9) | Miami (21–7) | Ole Miss (21–10) | Miami (25–11) | Ole Miss (27–13) | Arkansas (31–13) | San Diego (36–11) | Arizona State (32–17) | Purdue (41–12) | NC State (39–17) | Rice (41–19) | 18. |
| 19. | Oklahoma | UCF (3–0) | UCF (5–2) | Cal State Fullerton (8–3) | UCF (13–4) | Oregon State (14–5) | Purdue (16–4) | Purdue (20–5) | Purdue (24–5) | San Diego (29–8) | NC State (26–12) | San Diego (33–11) | Arizona State (29–17) | Virginia (34–15) | UCF (41–14) | Stanford (38–16) | Texas A&M (43–18) | 19. |
| 20. | Florida State | Ole Miss (1–1) | Cal State Fullerton (3–3) | Clemson (5–4) | Texas State (11–4) | NC State (15–3) | NC State (16–5) | Oregon State (17–8) | San Diego (25–8) | Arizona State (23–13) | Texas (23–14) | Arizona State (26–17) | Arkansas (34–15) | TCU (32–16) | TCU (35–17) | UCF (41–14) | Kentucky (45–18) | 20. |
| 21. | UCF | Oregon State (3–1) | Texas (2–5) | Texas State (8–3) | Mississippi State (14–3) | UCF (16–5) | Baylor (18–7) | San Diego (23–7) | Arizona State (19–12) | NC State (24–10) | Arkansas (28–12) | Sam Houston State (31–12) | Virginia (34–15) | San Diego (38–13) | San Diego (39–13) | Arizona State (36–20) | Cal State Fullerton (36–21) | 21. |
| 22. | Ole Miss | UCLA (1–2) | TCU (2–4) | Oklahoma (7–3) | Oklahoma (11–5) | Texas (10–8) | Oregon State (15–7) | Oregon (18–8) | NC State (21–9) | Mississippi (24–12) | Miami (26–14) | Louisville (31–13) | Louisville (33–15) | Louisville (35–17) | Louisville (38–18) | Vanderbilt (33–26) | Mississippi State (40–24) | 22. |
| 23. | Oregon State | Oklahoma (1–2) | Oklahoma (4–2) | Mississippi State (10–2) | NC State (11–3) | Texas State (13–6) | Oregon (15–6) | Auburn (17–11) | Texas (17–12) | Texas (20–13) | Arizona State (24–16) | Virginia (30–14) | Oregon State (30–15) | Oregon State (32–17) | Oregon State (35–18) | Miami (36–21) | Purdue (45–14) | 23. |
| 24. | Louisville | Louisville (2–1) | Louisville (6–1) | Louisville (8–3) | Purdue(11–1) | Oregon (13–5) | San Diego (20–6) | Arizona State (16–12) | Sam Houston State (23–9) | Sam Houston State (25–10) | Sam Houston State (28–11) | Ole Miss (28–16) | TCU (29–16) | Appalachian State (36–12) | Mississippi State (34–21) | Pepperdine (34–21) | Oregon State (40–20) | 24. |
| 25. | Cal State Fullerton | Baylor (3–0) | Baylor (6–2) | Maryland (9–1) | Oregon State (11–5) | Purdue (14–3) | Georgia (17–8) | Texas (15–11) | New Mexico State (25–9) | New Mexico State (27–10) | New Mexico State (30–11) | Texas (25–16) | Mississippi State (29–18) | Ole Miss (34–18) | Arkansas (39–17) | Stony Brook (46–11) | Virginia (39–19) | 25. |
| | Preseason Jan 24 | Week 1 Feb 20 | Week 2 Feb 27 | Week 3 Mar 5 | Week 4 Mar 12 | Week 5 Mar 19 | Week 6 Mar 26 | Week 7 Apr 2 | Week 8 Apr 9 | Week 9 Apr 16 | Week 10 Apr 23 | Week 11 Apr 30 | Week 12 May 7 | Week 13 May 14 | Week 14 May 21 | Week 15 May 28 | Week 16 June 26 | |
| | | Dropped: 25 Cal State Fullerton | Dropped: 17 Vanderbilt; 21 Oregon State | Dropped: 21 Texas; 22 TCU; 25 Baylor | Dropped: 20 Clemson; 24 Louisville; 25 Maryland | Dropped: 21 Mississippi State; 22 Oklahoma | Dropped: 15 Georgia Tech; 23 Texas State | Dropped: 25 Georgia | Dropped: 20 Oregon State; 23 Auburn | None | None | Dropped: 22 Miami; 25 New Mexico State | Dropped: 21 Sam Houston State; 24 Ole Miss; 25 Texas | Dropped: 20 Arkansas; 25 Mississippi State | Dropped: 24 Appalachian State; 25 Ole Miss | Dropped: 20 TCU; 21 San Diego; 22 Louisville; 25 Arkansas | Dropped: 20 UCF; 21 Arizona State; 22 Vanderbilt; 23 Miami; 24 Pepperdine | |

== Collegiate Baseball Poll ==
| | Preseason Dec 19 | Week 1 Feb 20 | Week 2 Feb 27 | Week 3 Mar 5 | Week 4 Mar 12 | Week 5 Mar 19 | Week 6 Mar 26 | Week 7 Apr 2 | Week 8 Apr 9 | Week 9 Apr 16 | Week 10 Apr 23 | Week 11 Apr 30 | Week 12 May 7 | Week 13 May 14 | Week 14 May 21 | Week 15 May 28 | Week 16 June 5 | Week 17 June 11 | Week 18 | |
|---|---|---|---|---|---|---|---|---|---|---|---|---|---|---|---|---|---|---|---|---|
| 1. | Florida | Florida (2–1) | Florida (7–1) | Florida (10–1) | Florida (15–1) | Florida (19–1) | Florida (22–2) | Kentucky (27–2) | Kentucky (30–3) | LSU (30–7) | Kentucky (35–6) т | Baylor (38–8) | Florida State (39–7) | Oregon (37–14) | Oregon (41–14) | LSU (43–16) | LSU (46–16) | Florida (47–18) | Arizona (48–17) | 1. |
| 2. | South Carolina | South Carolina (3–0) | South Carolina (6–0) | South Carolina (9–1) | South Carolina (13–1) | Kentucky (21–0) | Kentucky (24–1) | Florida (24–4) | Florida State (27–5) | Kentucky (32–5) | Baylor (35–7) т | Florida State (36–7) | Baylor (38–8) | Kentucky (41–11) | LSU (42–14) | South Carolina (40–17) | South Carolina (43–17) | South Carolina (45–17) | South Carolina (49–20) | 2. |
| 3. | Stanford | Stanford (3–0) | Stanford (7–0) | Stanford (10–1) | Stanford (13–2) | Stanford (13–2) | Stanford (15–2) | Florida State (24–4) | LSU (25–7) | Baylor (30–7) | LSU (32–9) | Kentucky (36–9) | South Carolina (36–12) | South Carolina (38–13) | South Carolina (39–14) | Florida (42–18) | Florida (45–18) | Florida State (48–15) | Arkansas (46–22) | 3. |
| 4. | North Carolina | Texas A&M (3–0) | Rice (8–0) | Rice (11–1) | North Carolina (13–2) | Arkansas (19–2) | Arkansas (22–3) | UCLA (20–5) | Florida (25–7) | Florida (28–8) | Florida (31–9) | South Carolina (33–11) | LSU (38–11) | LSU (39–13) | Florida (40–16) | Florida State (43–15) | Florida State (46–15) | UCLA (47–14) | Florida State (50–17) | 4. |
| 5. | Texas | Rice (3–0) | Texas A&M (6–1) | Texas A&M (11–1) | Arkansas (14–2) | Florida State (16–2) | Florida State (21–3) | Arizona (21–7) | Baylor (25–7) | Florida State (29–7) | Florida State (33–7) | LSU (35–10) | Florida (35–13) | Florida (38–14) | Florida State (43–12) | Baylor (44–140 | Baylor (48–15) | Arizona (43–17) | UCLA (48–16) | 5. |
| 6. | Texas A&M | North Carolina (2–1) | North Carolina (6–1) | North Carolina (8–2) | Florida State (14–1) | South Carolina (15–4) | North Carolina (18–5) | North Carolina (22–6) | Texas A&M (26–6) | Oregon (24–10) | Arizona (26–13) | Arizona (29–13) | Oregon (34–14) | Florida State (40–10) | Baylor (42–12) | North Carolina (44–14) | UCLA (45–14) | Arkansas (44–20) | Kent State (47–20) | 6. |
| 7. | Rice | Texas (2–1) | Arkansas (7–1) | Arkansas (11–2) | Rice (13–4) | North Carolina (16–4) | Miami (19–5) | LSU (22–6) | Miami (24–8) | UCLA (24–8) | South Carolina (30–11) | Oregon (30–13) | Kentucky (37–11) | Baylor (39–11) | North Carolina (42–13) | UCLA (42–14) | Arizona (41–17) | Stony Brook (52–13) | Florida (47–20) | 7. |
| 8. | Arkansas | Arkansas (3–0) | Miami (7–0) | Florida State (9–1) | Cal State Fullerton (10–5) | LSU (16–4) | Texas A&M (19–5) | Baylor (22–7) | Arizona (23–9) | Arizona (24–11) | Rice (30–12) | Florida (33–12) | Rice (33–13) | Arizona (33–15) | Arizona (36–16) | Arizona (38–17) | Oregon (45–17) | Kent State (46–18) | Stony Brook (52–15) | 8. |
| 9. | Georgia Tech | LSU (3–0) | Georgia (7–0) | Oregon (10–1) | Texas A&M (13–3) | Miami (16–4) | NC State (16–5) | Texas A&M (22–6) | Arkansas (24–7) | Texas A&M (28–8) | Oregon (27–12) | Rice (30–12) | Cal State Fullerton (30–14) | Rice (36–14) | Rice (39–15) | Rice (41–16) | Stanford (41–16) | LSU (47–18) | LSU (47–18) | 9. |
| 10. | TCU | Georgia Tech (3–1) | Florida State (6–1) | Georgia Tech (10–2) | LSU (13–3) | Rice (15–6) | Cal State Fullerton (14–8) | Rice (21–9) | Oregon (20–9) | North Carolina (27–9) | UCLA (26–10) | Stanford (28–11) | Arizona (30–15) | North Carolina (38–13) | UCLA (38–14) | Oregon (42–17) | NC State (43–18) | Baylor (49–17) | Baylor (49–17) | 10. |
| 11. | St. John's | Florida State (3–0) | Arizona State (5–1) | LSU (10–2) | Miami (12–3) | NC State (15–3) | UCLA (17–4) | Arkansas (22–6) | UCLA (21–7) | Rice (27–11) | UCF (34–8) | UCLA (28–12) | UCLA (31–13) | UCLA (35–13) | Texas A&M (41–14) | Texas A&M (42–17) | Arkansas (42–19) | Oregon (46–19) | Oregon (46–19) | 11. |
| 12. | LSU | Miami (3–0) | Georgia Tech (6–2) | Cal State Fullerton (8–3) | Oregon (12–3) | Cal State Fullerton (12–7) | LSU (18–6) | Miami (21–7) | North Carolina (23–9) | UCF (30–8) | Cal State Fullerton (26–13) | Texas A&M (31–13) | Texas A&M (34–14) | Cal State Fullerton (32–15) | Stanford (36–14) | Stanford (38–16) | Oklahoma (42–23) | NC State (43–20) | NC State (43–20) | 12. |
| 13. | Florida State | Arizona State (3–0) | LSU (5–2) | Arizona State (8–2) | Arizona (13–2) | Texas A&M (16–5) | Rice (18–8) | NC State (19–7) | Rice (23–11) | South Carolina (27–10) | Stanford (25–10) | Arkansas (31–13) | Arkansas (34–15) | Texas A&M (37–14) | Kentucky (41–15) | Kentucky (43–16) | Kent State (44–17) | Oklahoma (42–25) | Oklahoma (42–25) | 13. |
| 14. | Miami | Georgia (3–0) | Louisville (6–1) | Miami (8–3) | Stetson (12–3) | Arizona (16–4) | South Carolina (17–7) | Oregon (18–8) | Cal State Fullerton (21–10) | Cal State Fullerton (23–12) | Texas A&M (28–12) | Cal State Fullerton (26–14) | North Carolina (34–13) | NC State (36–13) | Arkansas (39–17) | Cal State Fullerton (35–19) | St. John's (40–21) | Stanford (41–18) | Stanford (41–18) | 14. |
| 15. | Louisville | TCU (1–1) | Oregon (7–1) | Georgia (10–2) | Ole Miss (13–2) | Stetson (15–4) | Arizona (18–7) | Cal State Fullerton (17–10) | UCF (26–7) | Miami (25–11) | North Carolina (29–12) | UCF (35–10) | NC State (34–13) | Stanford (32–14) | Cal State Fullerton (33–18) | NC State (39–17) | TCU (40–20) | St. John's (40–23) | St. John's (40–23) | 15. |
| 16. | Oklahoma | Louisville (2–1) | Oklahoma (4–2) | Louisville (8–3) | Kentucky (16–0) | UCLA (15–4) | Oregon (15–6) | Stanford (16–6) | Stanford (19–7) | Arkansas (25–10) | San Diego (31–9) | North Carolina (30–13) | Stanford (29–14) | Arizona State (32–17) | NC State (38–15) | Purdue (44–12) | Stony Brook (50–12) | TCU (40–22) | TCU (40–22) | 16. |
| 17. | Arizona State | Oklahoma (1–2) | Cal State Fullerton (3–3) | Oklahoma (7–3) | UCLA (12–3) | Oregon (13–5) | Arizona State (15–8) | UCF (23–6) | NC State (21–9) | San Diego (29–8) | Purdue (31–6) | NC State (30–12) | UCF (37–11) | Arkansas (35–17) | Arizona State (35–18) | Mississippi State (39–22) | North Carolina (46–16) | North Carolina (46–16) | North Carolina (46–16) | 17. |
| 18. | Georgia | St. John's (1–2) | Arizona (5–2) | Arizona (8–2) | Arizona State (10–4) | Arizona State (12–7) | Baylor (18–7) | South Carolina (10–8) | South Carolina (23–9) | NC State (24–10) | Texas (23–14) | Purdue (34–7) | San Diego (36–11) | Purdue (39–10) | Purdue (41–12) | Oregon State (38–18) | Rice (42–18) | Rice (42–18) | Rice (42–18) | 18. |
| 19. | UCLA | Cal State Fullerton (1–2) | Stetson (6–1) | Stetson (9–2) | NC State (11–3) | TCU (11–6) | Texas (13–9) | San Diego (23–7) | San Diego (25–8) | Stanford (22–9) | Ole Miss (27–13) | San Diego (33–11) | Arizona State (29–17) | UCF (40–12) | UCF (41–14) | Arkansas (39–19) | Texas A&M (43–18) | Texas A&M (43–18) | Texas A&M (43–18) | 19. |
| 20. | Arizona | California (3–0) | Clemson (4–2) | Clemson (5–4) | Georgia Tech (11–5) | Georgia Tech (14–6) | Louisville (18–6) | New Mexico State (22–8) | Sam Houston State (23–9) | Sam Houston State (25–10) | Arkansas (28–12) | Texas (25–16) | St. John's (31–17) | San Diego (38–13) | San Diego (39–13) | Arizona State (36–20) | Arizona State (36–20) | Arizona State (36–20) | Arizona State (36–20) | 20. |
| 21. | Cal State Fullerton | Oregon State (3–1) | USC (7–0) | Maryland (9–1) | Oklahoma (11–5) | Texas (10–8) | UCF (19–6) | Ole Miss (20–8) | Ole Miss (21–10) | Arizona State (23–13) | NC State (26–12) | Sam Houston State (31–12) | Purdue (35–9) | Texas (29–18) | Mississippi State (34–21) | UCF (43–15) | Kentucky (45–18) | Kentucky (45–18) | Kentucky (45–18) | 21. |
| 22. | California | Arizona (2–1) | Cal Poly (7–1) | Ole Miss (9–2) | Louisville (10–5) | Louisville (14–6) | Purdue (16–4) | Purdue (20–5) | Purdue (24–5) | Purdue (28–5) | Sam Houston State (28–11) | Louisville (31–13) | Oregon State (30–15) | Oklahoma State (32–19) | Texas (30–20) | Miami (36–21) | Cal State Fullerton (36–21) | Cal State Fullerton (36–21) | Cal State Fullerton (36–21) | 22. |
| 23. | Vanderbilt | Stetson (3–0) | Ole Miss (5–1) | Kentucky (11–0) | Georgia (11–5) | Georgia (15–6) | Oregon State (15–7) | Oregon State (17–8) | New Mexico State (25–9) | Texas (20–13) | Oklahoma (26–14) | Virginia (30–14–1) | Virginia (31–14–1) | Virginia (34–15–1) | Miami (34–19) | Oklahoma (38–22) | Purdue (45–14) | Purdue (45–14) | Purdue (45–14) | 23. |
| 24. | Oregon State | Oregon (2–1) | Texas Tech (7–1) | Gonzaga (10–0) | Wake Forest (14–4) | Purdue (14–3) | Auburn (15–9) | Sam Houston State (19–9) | Arizona State (19–12) | Ole Miss (24–12) | Miami (26–14) | Coastal Carolina (30–13) | Texas (27–18) | Oklahoma (33–19) | Virginia (36–16–1) | Virginia (38–17–1) | Mississippi State (40–24) | Mississippi State (40–24) | Mississippi State (40–24) | 24. |
| 25. | Clemson | Clemson (2–1) | California (4–2) | California (8–2) | California (11–3) | Oregon State (14–5) | Coastal Carolina (16–6) | Texas (15–11) | Texas (17–12) | New Mexico State (27–10) | New Mexico State (30–11) | Oklahoma State (26–17) | Oklahoma State (28–18) | Louisville (35–17) | Oklahoma (35–21) | Kent State (41–17) | Oregon State (40–20) | Oregon State (40–20) | Oregon State (40–20) | 25. |
| 26. | Stetson | Baylor (3–0) | Oregon State (5–3) | Texas Tech (9–3) | Purdue (11–1) | Ole Miss (15–5) | Georgia (17–8) | Louisville (20–8) | Louisville (23–9) | Oklahoma (22–14) | Louisville (28–12) | Oklahoma (28–16 | louisville (33–15) | St. John's (32–19) | Louisville (38–18) | New Mexico (36–22) | UCF (45–17) | UCF (45–17) | UCF (45–17) | 26. |
| 27. | Oregon | UC Irvine (3–0) | Maryland (5–1) | UCLA (8–3) | Texas Tech (10–4) | Baylor (14–7) | Ole Miss (17–7) | Auburn (17–11) | Cal Poly (20–10) | Louisville (25–11) | TCU (23–14) | TCU (26–15) | Utah Valley (35–11) | Utah Valley (39–11) | Kent State (37–17) | San Diego (40–15) | Virginia (39–19–1) | Virginia (39–19–1) | Virginia (39–19–1) | 27. |
| 28. | Baylor | Southern Miss (2–1) | UCLA (4–3) | Oregon State (8–4) | Oregon State (11–5) | UCF (16–5) | Sam Houston State (14–9) | Coastal Carolina (18–8) | Florida Atlantic (22–11) | TCU (20–13) | Oregon State (26–12) | Arizona State (26–17) | TCU (29–16) | Oregon State (32–17) | Oregon State (35–18) | Vanderbilt (33–26) | Pepperdine (36–23) | Pepperdine (36–23) | Pepperdine (36–23) | 28. |
| 29. | UC Irvine | College of Charleston (3–0) | Baylor (6–2) | Purdue (8–1) | UCF (13–4) | Appalachian State (17–3) | Missouri State (19–6) | UC Irvine (17–9) | Virginia (21–10–1) | Missouri State (27–10) | Arizona State (24–16) | Mississippi State (21–17) | Coastal Carolina (32–14) | TCU (32–16) | TCU (35–17) | St. John's (37–21) | Appalachian State (41–18) | Appalachian State (41–18) | Appalachian State (41–18) | 29. |
| 30. | Southern Miss | Georgia Southern (3–0) | College of Charleston (5–1) | UCF (10–2) | Texas State (11–4) | Texas State (13–6) | Saint Louis (19–5) | Florida Atlantic (19–10) | Appalachian State (24–6) | Oregon State (23–11) | Clemson (24–17) | St. John's (28–16) | Mississippi State (29–18) | Ole Miss (34–18) | Utah Valley (43–12) | Georgia Tech (36–24) | Louisville (41–22) | Louisville (41–22) | Louisville (41–22) | 30. |
| | Preseason Dec 19 | Week 1 Feb 20 | Week 2 Feb 27 | Week 3 Mar 5 | Week 4 Mar 12 | Week 5 Mar 19 | Week 6 Mar 26 | Week 7 Apr 2 | Week 8 Apr 9 | Week 9 Apr 16 | Week 10 Apr 23 | Week 11 Apr 30 | Week 12 May 7 | Week 13 May 14 | Week 14 May 21 | Week 15 May 28 | Week 16 June 5 | Week 17 June 11 | Week 18 | |
| | | Dropped: 19 UCLA (1–2); 23 Vanderbilt (0–3) | Dropped: 7 Texas; 15 TCU; 18 St. John's; 27 UC Irvine; 28 Southern Miss; 30 Georgia Southern | Dropped: 21 USC; 22 Cal Poly; 29 Baylor; 30 College of Charleston | Dropped: 20 Clemson; 21 Maryland; 24 Gonzaga | Dropped: 21 Oklahoma; 24 Wake Forest; 25 California; 27 Texas Tech | Dropped: 15 Stetson; 19 TCU; 20 Georgia Tech; 29 Appalachian State; 30 Texas State | Dropped: 17 Arizona State; 26 Georgia; 29 Missouri State; 30 Saint Louis | Dropped: 23 Oregon State; 27 Auburn; 28 Coastal Carolina; 29 UC Irvine | Dropped: 27 Cal Poly; 28 Florida Atlantic; 29 Virginia; 30 Appalachian State | Dropped: 29 Missouri State | Dropped: 19 Ole Miss; 24 Miami; 25 New Mexico State; 28 Oregon State; 30 Clemson | Dropped: 21 Sam Houston State; 26 Oklahoma | Dropped: 29 Coastal Carolina; 30 Mississippi State | Dropped: 22 Oklahoma State; 26 St. John's; 30 Ole Miss | Dropped: 22 Texas; 26 Louisville; 29 TCU; 30 Utah Valley | Dropped: 22 Miami; 26 New Mexico; 27 San Diego; 28 Vanderbilt; 30 Georgia Tech | None | None | |

The Collegiate Baseball Preseason poll ranks the top 40 teams, while each subsequent week ranks the top 30. This table shows only the top 30.

== NCBWA Poll ==
| | Preseason Jan 27 | Week 1 Feb 20 | Week 2 Feb 27 | Week 3 Mar 5 | Week 4 Mar 12 | Week 5 Mar 19 | Week 6 Mar 26 | Week 7 Apr 2 | Week 8 Apr 9 | Week 9 Apr 16 | Week 10 Apr 23 | Week 11 Apr 30 | Week 12 May 7 | Week 13 May 14 | Week 14 May 21 | Week 15 May 28 | Week 16 June 5 | Week 17 June 11 | Week 18 June 26 | |
|---|---|---|---|---|---|---|---|---|---|---|---|---|---|---|---|---|---|---|---|---|
| 1. | Florida | Florida | Florida (7–1) | Florida (10–1) | Florida (15–1) | Florida (19–1) | Florida (22–2) | Florida (24–4) | Florida State (27–5) | Florida (28–8) | Florida State (33–7) | Florida State (36–7) | Florida State (39–7) | South Carolina (38–13) | Florida State (43–12) | Florida (42–18) | Florida (3–0) | Florida (47–18) | Arizona (48–17) | 1. |
| 2. | South Carolina | South Carolina | Stanford (7–0) | Stanford (10–1) | Stanford (13–2) | Stanford (13–2) | Stanford (15–2) | Florida State (24–4) | Texas A&M (26–6) | Florida State (29–7) | Florida (31–9) | Baylor (38–8) | Baylor (38–8) | Florida (38–14) | Florida (40–16) | Baylor (44–14) | Florida State (3–0) | Florida State (48–15) | South Carolina (49–20) | 2. |
| 3. | North Carolina | Stanford | South Carolina (6–0) | South Carolina (9–1) | South Carolina (13–1) | Arkansas (19–2) | Arkansas (22–3) | North Carolina (22–6) | Kentucky (30–3) | Kentucky (32–5) | Kentucky (35–6) | South Carolina (33–11) | South Carolina (36–12) | Florida State (40–10) | Baylor (42–12) | Florida State (43–15) | Baylor (4–1) | UCLA (47–14) | Arkansas (46–22) | 3. |
| 4. | Stanford | Texas A&M | Rice (8–0) | Rice (11–1) | North Carolina (13–2) | Florida State (16–2) | Florida State (21–3) | Texas A&M (22–6) | Florida (25–7) | Texas A&M (28–8) | South Carolina (30–11) | LSU (35–10) | LSU (38–11) | Rice (36–14) | Rice (39–15) | North Carolina (44–14) | UCLA (3–0) | South Carolina (45–17) | Florida State (50–17) | 4. |
| 5. | Texas A&M | Arkansas | Texas A&M (6–1) | Texas A&M (11–1) | Arkansas (14–2) | North Carolina (16–4) | North Carolina (18–5) | UCLA (20–5) | Stanford (19–7) | LSU (30–7) | Baylor (35–7) | Florida (33–12) | Florida (35–13) | Baylor (39–11) | South Carolina (39–15) | UCLA (42–14) | South Carolina (3–0) | Arizona (43–17) | UCLA (48–16) | 5. |
| 6. | Arkansas | North Carolina | North Carolina (5–1) | North Carolina (8–2) | Florida State (14–1) | South Carolina (15–4) | Miami (19–5) | Stanford (16–6) | Miami (24–8) | South Carolina (27–10) | LSU (32–9) | Stanford (28–11) | Rice (33–13) | Texas A&M (37–14) | Texas A&M (41–14) | South Carolina (40–17) | LSU (46–16) | Arkansas (44–20) | Florida (47–20) | 6. |
| 7. | Texas | Rice | Arkansas (7–1) | Arkansas (11–2) | Rice (13–4) | Miami (16–4) | Texas A&M (19–5) | Kentucky (27–2) | South Carolina (23–9) | North Carolina (27–9) | Stanford (25–10) | Kentucky (36–9) | Texas A&M (34–14) | North Carolina (38–13) | LSU (42–14) | Rice (40–17) | Stanford (41–16) | Stony Brook (52–13) | Kent State (47–20) | 7. |
| 8. | Rice | Florida State | Florida State (6–1) | Florida State (9–1) | Texas A&M (13–3) | Texas A&M (16–5) | UCLA (17–4) | South Carolina (20–8) | LSU (25–7) | Stanford (22–9) | UCF (34–8) | Rice (30–12) | North Carolina (34–13) | Kentucky (41–11) | North Carolina (42–13) | LSU (43–16) | Oregon (41–16) | Baylor (49–17) | Stony Brook (52–15) | 8. |
| 9. | Georgia Tech | Texas | Georgia Tech (6–2) | Georgia Tech (10–2) | Arizona (13–2) | Rice (15–6) | South Carolina (17–7) | Miami (21–7) | North Carolina (23–9) | UCLA (24–8) | Rice (30–12) | Texas A&M (31–13) | Kentucky (37–11) | LSU (39–13) | Oregon (41–14) | Texas A&M (42–16) | Arizona (41–17) | Kent State (46–18) | Baylor (49–17) | 9. |
| 10. | Florida State | LSU | Miami (7–0) | Arizona State (8–2) | Cal State Fullerton (10–5) | Arizona (16–4) | Kentucky (24–1) | Arizona (21–7) | Arkansas (24–7) | UCF (30–8) | Texas A&M (28–12) | North Carolina (30–13) | Oregon (34–14) | Oregon (37–14) | UCLA (38–14) | Stanford (38–16) | Arkansas (42–19) | LSU (47–18) | LSU (47–18) | 10. |
| 11. | Vanderbilt | Georgia Tech | Arizona State (5–1) | Cal State Fullerton (8–3) | Miami (12–3) | UCLA (15–4) | Rice (18–8) | Arkansas (22–6) | UCLA (21–7) | Miami (25–11) | North Carolina (29–12) | Purdue (34–7) | Stanford (29–14) | Stanford (32–14) | Stanford (36–14) | Oregon (42–17) | NC State (43–18) | Oregon (46–19) | Oregon (46–19) | 11. |
| 12. | LSU | Arizona State | Georgia (7–0) | Arizona (8–2) | Arizona State (10–4) | LSU (16–4) | Cal State Fullerton (14–8) | LSU (22–6) | Arizona (23–9) | Rice (27–11) | UCLA (26–10) | Oregon (30–13) | UCLA (31–13) | UCLA (35–13) | Kentucky (41–15) | Kentucky (43–16) | North Carolina (46–16) | Stanford (41–18) | Stanford (41–18) | 12. |
| 13. | TCU | Miami | Clemson (4–2) | Georgia (10–2) | LSU (13–3) | Kentucky (21–0) | Arizona (18–7) | Rice (21–9) | UCF (26–7) | Baylor (30–7) | Purdue (31–6) | UCF (35–10) | UCF (37–11) | UCF (40–12) | Arizona (36–16) | Arizona (38–17) | Oklahoma (42–23) | NC State (43–20) | NC State (43–20) | 13. |
| 14. | Oklahoma | TCU | Arizona (5–2) | Miami (8–3) | UCLA (12–3) | Cal State Fullerton (12–7) | LSU (18–6) | UCF (23–6) | Cal State Fullerton (21–10) | Oregon (24–10) | Oregon (27–12) | Arkansas (31–13) | Purdue (35–9) | Purdue (39–10) | Arkansas (39–17) | Purdue (44–12) | Rice (41–19) | Oklahoma (42–25) | Oklahoma (42–25) | 14. |
| 15. | Arizona State | Clemson | Cal State Fullerton (3–3) | LSU (10–2) | Georgia Tech (11–5) | Georgia Tech (14–6) | Arizona State (15–8) | Cal State Fullerton (17–10) | Rice (23–11) | Arkansas (25–10) | Miami (26–14) | UCLA (28–12) | Cal State Fullerton (30–14) | Cal State Fullerton (32–15) | Purdue (41–12) | UCF (43–15) | TCU (40–20) | North Carolina (46–16) | North Carolina (46–16) | 15. |
| 16. | Miami | Vanderbilt | LSU (5–2) | Oklahoma (7–3) | Ole Miss (13–2) | Oregon State (14–5) | UCF (19–6) | Ole Miss (20–8) | Oregon (20–9) | Arizona (24–11) | Cal State Fullerton (26–13) | Arizona (29–13) | Arkansas (34–15) | NC State (36–13) | UCF (41–14) | Virginia (38–17–1) | Texas A&M (43–18) | TCU (40–22) | TCU (40–22) | 16. |
| 17. | Clemson | Georgia | Oklahoma (4–2) | Clemson (5–4) | Oklahoma (11–5) | Georgia (15–6) | Louisville (18–6) | Oregon State (17–8) | Baylor (25–7) | Purdue (28–5) | Arkansas (28–12) | Cal State Fullerton (26–14) | NC State (33–12) | Arizona (33–15) | NC State (38–15) | Oregon State (38–18) | Kentucky (45–18) | St. John's (40–23) | St. John's (40–23) | 17. |
| 18. | Arizona | Arizona | Texas (2–5) | Oregon (10–1) | Georgia (11–5) | Arizona State (12–7) | Georgia (17–8) | Louisville (20–8) | Purdue (24–5) | Cal State Fullerton (23–12) | Arizona (26–13) | Louisville (31–13) | Oregon State (30–15) | Arkansas (35–17) | Virginia (36–16–1) | Cal State Fullerton (35–19) | Stony Brook (50–12) | Rice (41–19) | Rice (41–19) | 18. |
| 19. | Cal State Fullerton | Cal State Fullerton | Louisville (6–1) | Ole Miss (9–2) | Oregon State (11–5) | UCF (16–5) | Oregon State (15–7) | Oregon (18–8) | Louisville (23–9) | Arizona State (23–13) | Oregon State 926–12) | Miami (27–16) | Arizona (30–15) | Virginia (34–15–1) | Cal State Fullerton (33–18) | NC State (39–17) | UCF (45–17) | Texas A&M (43–18) | Texas A&M (43–18) | 19. |
| 20. | UCLA | Oregon State | Virginia (5–1–1) | UCLA (8–3) | Oregon (12–3) | Ole Miss (15–5) | Oregon (15–6) | Purdue (20–5) | Ole Miss (21–10) | Oregon State (23–11) | Louisville (28–12) | NC State (20–12) | Miami (30–17) | Oregon State (32–17) | Oregon State (35–18) | Arkansas (39–19) | St. John's (40–21) | Kentucky (45–18) | Kentucky (45–18) | 20. |
| 21. | Georgia | UC Irvine | TCU (2–4) | UCF (10–2) | California (11–3) | Louisville (14–6) | Georgia Tech (15–9) | Baylor (22–7) | Arizona State (19–12) | San Diego (29–8) | Ole Miss (27–13) | Oregon State (28–14) | Virginia (31–15–1) | Miami (32–18) | Miami (34–19) | Mississippi State (39–22) | Oregon State (40–20) | UCF (45–17) | UCF (45–17) | 21. |
| 22. | Oregon State | Oklahoma | Ole Miss (5–1) | Oregon State (8–4) | UCF (13–4) | Oregon (13–5) | Ole Miss (17–7) | Oklahoma (18–11) | Oregon State (18–11) | Louisville (25–11) | San Diego (31–9) | Virginia (30–14–1) | Louisville (33–15) | Arizona State (32–17) | Arizona State (35–18) | Miami (36–21) | Kent State (44–17) | Oregon State (40–20) | Oregon State (40–20) | 22. |
| 23. | Virginia | California | Oregon (7–1) | Louisville (8–3) | Clemson (6–7) | Clemson (9–8) | Texas (13–9) | Arizona State (16–12) | Virginia (21–10–1) | Ole Miss (24–12) | Arizona State (24–16) | Arizona State (26–17) | Arizona State (29–17) | Ole Miss (34–18) | Louisville (38–18) | Arizona State (36–20) | Purdue (45–14) | Purdue (45–14) | Purdue (45–14) | 23. |
| 24. | UC Irvine | UCF | Oregon State (5–3) | California (8–2) | Kentucky (16–0) | TCU (11–6) | Oklahoma (15–10) | Georgia Tech (18–11) | San Diego (25–8) | NC State (24–10) | Texas (23–14) | San Diego (33–11) | San Diego (36–11) | Louisville (35–17) | TCU (35–17) | Oklahoma (38–22) | Virginia (39–19–1) | Virginia (39–19–1) | Virginia (39–19–1) | 24. |
| 25. | Louisville | Louisville | UCLA (5–3) | Texas (4–7) | Louisville (10–5) | Texas (10–8) | Purdue (16–4) | Georgia (18–11) | Texas (17–12) | Texas (20–13) | NC State (26–12) | Sam Houston State (31–12) | Ole Miss (31–18) | TCU (32–16) | San Diego (39–13) | Louisville (39–20) | Cal State Fullerton (36–21) | Cal State Fullerton (36–21) | Cal State Fullerton (36–21) | 25. |
| 26. | California | Virginia | UCF (5–2) | TCU (4–6) | Virginia (9–5–1) | NC State(15–3) | Virginia (15–8–1) | NC State (19–7) | NC State (21–9) | Georgia (22–14) | Virginia (26–14–1) | Ole Miss (28–16) | TCU (29–16) | San Diego (38–13) | Mississippi State (34–21) | TCU (36–19) | Arizona State (36–20) | Arizona State (36–20) | Arizona State (36–20) | 26. |
| 27. | St. John's | UCLA | Baylor (6–2) | Virginia (6–4–1) | USC (12–3) | Oklahoma (11–9) | NC State (16–5) | Texas (15–11) | Appalachian State (24–6) | Virginia (23–13–1) | Sam Houston State (28–11) | Texas (25–16) | Dallas Baptist (34–14) | Texas (29–18) | Utah Valley (43–12) | Utah Valley (47–12) | Vanderbilt (35–28) | Vanderbilt (35–28) | Vanderbilt (35–28) | 27. |
| 28. | UCF | Ole Miss | California (4–2) | Baylor (9–4) | Purdue (11–1) | Purdue (14–3) | Baylor (18–7) | San Diego (23–7) | Georgia (19–13) | Sam Houston State (25–10) | Georgia (24–17) | Appalachian State (32–9) | Texas (27–18) | Oklahoma (33–19) | Oklahoma (35–21) | San Diego (40–15) | Mississippi State (40–24) | Louisville (41–22) | Louisville (41–22) | 28. |
| 29. | Southern Miss | Baylor | USC (7–0) | Gonzaga (10–0) | TCU (6–6) | California (11–7) | San Diego (20–6) | Virginia (18–10) | Sam Houston State (23–9) | East Carolina (25–10–1) | New Mexico State (30–11) | TCU (26–15) | Sam Houston State (32–15) | Sam Houston State (34–16) | Ole Miss (34–22) | Stony Brook (46–11) | Louisville (41–22) | Utah Valley (47–12) | Utah Valley (47–12) | 29. |
| 30. | Ole Miss | Southern Miss | UC Irvine (4–3) | Maryland (9–1) | Texas (6–8) | Virginia (11–7–1) | Coastal Carolina (16–6) | Appalachian State (22–5) | East Carolina (22–8–1) | Gonzaga (25–9) | Army (33–9) | Stony Brook (34–10) | East Carolina (31–16–1) | Utah Valley (39–11) | Stony Brook (43–11) | Vanderbilt (33–26) | Utah Valley (47–12) | Mississippi State (40–24) | Mississippi State (40–24) | 30. |
| | Preseason Jan 27 | Week 1 Feb 20 | Week 2 Feb 27 | Week 3 Mar 5 | Week 4 Mar 12 | Week 5 Mar 19 | Week 6 Mar 26 | Week 7 Apr 2 | Week 8 Apr 9 | Week 9 Apr 16 | Week 10 Apr 23 | Week 11 Apr 30 | Week 12 May 7 | Week 13 May 14 | Week 14 May 21 | Week 15 May 28 | Week 16 June 5 | Week 17 June 11 | Week 18 June 26 | |
| | | Dropped: 27 St. John's | Dropped: 16 Vanderbilt; 30 Southern Miss | Dropped: 29 USC; 30 UC Irvine | Dropped: 28 Baylor; 29 Gonzaga; 30 Maryland | Dropped: 27 USC | Dropped: 23 Clemson; 24 TCU; 29 California | Dropped: 30 Coastal Carolina | Dropped: 22 Oklahoma; 24 Georgia Tech | Dropped: 27 Appalachian State | Dropped: 29 East Carolina; 30 Gonzaga | Dropped: 28 Georgia; 29 New Mexico; 30 Army | Dropped: 28 Appalachian State; 30 Stony Brook | Dropped: 27 Dallas Baptist; 30 East Carolina | Dropped: 27 Texas; 29 Sam Houston State | Dropped: 29 Ole Miss | Dropped: 22 Miami; 28 San Diego | None | None | |

The NCBWA Preseason Poll ranks the top 35 teams, while each subsequent week ranks the top 30. This table only shows the top 30 of the Preseason Poll
