= 2012 Purdue Boilermakers baseball team =

American college baseball season

2012 Purdue Boilermakers baseball

Big Ten Regular Season Champions Big Ten Tournament Champions

Gary Regional, L, Kentucky 3–6
- Conference: Big Ten Conference

Ranking
- AP: No. 15
- Record: 45–14 (17–7 Big Ten)
- Head coach: Doug Schreiber (14th season)
- Hitting coach: Jeff Duncan (3rd season)
- Pitching coach: Tristan McIntyre (2nd season)
- MVPs: Kevin Plawecki; Joe Haase
- Captains: Eric Charles; Joe Haase
- Home stadium: Lambert Field

2012 Big Ten Conference baseball standings
	Conf.				Overall
Team	W		L	PCT	W		L	PCT
No. 15 Purdue ‍†‍‡‍^{y}	17	–	7	.708	45	–	14	.763
Indiana ‍‍‍	16	–	8	.667	32	–	28	.533
Penn State ‍‍‍	15	–	9	.625	29	–	27	.518
Nebraska ‍‍‍	14	–	10	.583	35	–	23	.603
Michigan State ‍‍‍^{y}	13	–	11	.542	37	–	23	.617
Ohio State ‍‍‍	11	–	13	.458	33	–	27	.550
Illinois ‍‍‍	11	–	13	.458	28	–	25	.528
Minnesota ‍‍‍	11	–	13	.458	29	–	27	.518
Iowa ‍‍‍	10	–	14	.417	23	–	27	.460
Michigan ‍‍‍	8	–	16	.333	22	–	34	.393
Northwestern ‍‍‍	6	–	18	.250	18	–	36	.333
† – Conference champion ‡ – Tournament champion y – Invited to the NCAA tournament As of June 30, 2012; Rankings from Coaches' Poll

The 2012 Purdue Boilermakers baseball team was a baseball team that represented Purdue University in the 2012 NCAA Division I baseball season. The Boilermakers are members of the Big Ten Conference and played their home games at Lambert Field in West Lafayette, Indiana. They were led by fourteenth-year head coach Doug Schreiber.

== Preseason ==
In 2011, Purdue compiled a 37–20 record (14–10 in conference play) during the regular season, failing to qualify for a postseason for the fourth straight season.

== Roster ==
2012 Purdue Boilermakers baseball team
Players
Coaches

#	Pos.	Name	B/T	Height	Weight	Year	Previous school	Home town
1	P	Joe Haase	R/R	5 ft 11 in (1.8 m)	185 lb (84 kg)	Sr	Knightstown H. S.	Knightstown, Indiana
2	INF	Eric Charles	R/R	5 ft 10 in (1.78 m)	180 lb (82 kg)	RS Fr	Zionsville Community H. S.	Zionsville, Indiana
6	INF	Jake Hansen	L/R	5 ft 8 in (1.73 m)	160 lb (73 kg)	RS Jr	Westfield H. S.	Westfield, Indiana
7	P	Pat Gannon	R/L	6 ft 0 in (1.83 m)	185 lb (84 kg)	Jr	Brother Rice H. S.	Evergreen Park, Illinois
8		Angelo Cianfrocco	L/L	6 ft 3 in (1.91 m)	185 lb (84 kg)	RS Jr	Westview H. S.	San Diego, California
9	INF	Brandon Krieg	R/R	6 ft 0 in (1.83 m)	180 lb (82 kg)	Fr	Lawrence Central H. S.	Indianapolis, Indiana
10		Jack DeAno	L/R	5 ft 11 in (1.8 m)	175 lb (79 kg)	So	Wheaton North H. S.	Wheaton, Illinois
11	OF	Andrew Dixon	L/R	5 ft 10 in (1.78 m)	175 lb (79 kg)	Sr	Lafayette H. S.	Lafayette, Louisiana
13	P	Blake Mascarello	L/L	6 ft 1 in (1.85 m)	200 lb (91 kg)	Sr	Crown Point H. S.	Crown Point, Indiana
14		Kyle Wood	L/L	6 ft 0 in (1.83 m)	200 lb (91 kg)	Fr	St. Laurence H. S.	Orland Park, Illinois
15	INF	Bennett Oliver	L/R	6 ft 1 in (1.85 m)	170 lb (77 kg)	Fr	Washburn Rural H. S.	Topeka, Kansas
16	C	Patrick Coghlan	R/R	5 ft 7 in (1.7 m)	165 lb (75 kg)	RS Jr	Westview H. S.	Portland, Oregon
17		Sean McHugh	R/R	5 ft 11 in (1.8 m)	195 lb (88 kg)	So	Blue Valley North H. S.	Leawood, Kansas
18		Mike Gaglianese	R/R	6 ft 1 in (1.85 m)	180 lb (82 kg)	Fr	Notre Dame Junior Senior H. S.	Oriskany, New York
19	INF	Kyle Upp	R/R	5 ft 10 in (1.78 m)	185 lb (84 kg)	Fr	La Porte H. S.	La Porte, Indiana
21	INF	Ryan Bridges	R/R	6 ft 0 in (1.83 m)	215 lb (98 kg)	RS Sr	Griffith H. S.	Griffith, Indiana
22		Cameron Perkins	R/R	6 ft 5 in (1.96 m)	200 lb (91 kg)	Jr	Southport H. S.	Indianapolis, Indiana
23	INF	Barrett Serrato	L/R	6 ft 2 in (1.88 m)	185 lb (84 kg)	Sr	West Chicago H. S.	West Chicago, Illinois
25	RHP	Andrew Quinnette	R/R	6 ft 0 in (1.83 m)	200 lb (91 kg)	RS Sr	Kokomo H. S.	Kokomo, Indiana
26	C	Kevin Plawecki	R/R	6 ft 1 in (1.85 m)	215 lb (98 kg)	Jr	Westfield H. S.	Carmel, Indiana
28	RHP	Nick Wittgren	R/R	6 ft 3 in (1.91 m)	205 lb (93 kg)	Jr	McCutcheon H. S.	Lafayette, Indiana
29	RHP	David Miller	L/R	5 ft 8 in (1.73 m)	170 lb (77 kg)	Sr	St. Louis University H. S.	St. Louis, Missouri
32	RHP	Brett Andrzejewski	R/R	6 ft 2 in (1.88 m)	160 lb (73 kg)	Jr	Westfield H. S.	Westfield, Indiana
33	RHP	Joe Eichmann	L/R	6 ft 4 in (1.93 m)	210 lb (95 kg)	Fr	Libertyville H. S.	Libertyville, Illinois
34	RHP	Connor Podkul	R/R	6 ft 4 in (1.93 m)	205 lb (93 kg)	Fr	La Porte H. S.	La Porte, Indiana
35	LHP	Calvin Gunter	L/L	6 ft 0 in (1.83 m)	180 lb (82 kg)	RS Sr	Noblesville H. S.	Noblesville, Indiana
36	OF	Stephen Talbott	R/R	6 ft 3 in (1.91 m)	205 lb (93 kg)	RS Jr	Freehold Township H. S.	Freehold, New Jersey
37	RHP	Sean Collins	R/R	6 ft 5 in (1.96 m)	215 lb (98 kg)	Sr	Pendleton Heights H. S.	Pendleton, Indiana
38	C	Kyle Bischoff	S/R	6 ft 0 in (1.83 m)	185 lb (84 kg)	RS Jr	New Haven H. S.	Decatur, Indiana
39	LHP	Mike Sudbury	L/L	6 ft 7 in (2.01 m)	205 lb (93 kg)	Sr	Munster H. S.	Munster, Indiana
40	RHP	Brad Schreiber	R/R	6 ft 4 in (1.93 m)	235 lb (107 kg)	RS Jr	Kimberly H. S.	Menasha, Wisconsin
42	OF	Chris Antonelli	R/R	5 ft 11 in (1.8 m)	195 lb (88 kg)	Sr	Westminster Christian School	Miami, Florida
43	RHP	Robert Ramer	R/R	6 ft 4 in (1.93 m)	190 lb (86 kg)	RS Jr	Fremont H. S.	Sunnyvale, California
44	OF	Tyler Spillner	L/R	6 ft 1 in (1.85 m)	195 lb (88 kg)	Sr	Northrop H. S.	Fort Wayne, Indiana
45	RHP	Lance Breedlove	R/R	6 ft 1 in (1.85 m)	180 lb (82 kg)	Sr	Los Alamitos H. S.	Long Beach, California

Head coach

Doug Schreiber

Assistant coach(es)

Payton Bieker

Hitting coach(es)

Jeff Duncan

Pitching coach(es)

Tristan McIntyre

Legend

- (C) Team captain
- (S) Suspended
- (I) Ineligible
- Injured
- Current redshirt

Roster
Last update: February 20, 2017

== Schedule ==
2012 Purdue Boilermakers baseball game log
Regular season
February

#	Date	Opponent	Site/stadium	Score	Win	Loss	Save	Attendance	Overall record	B1G record
1	February 18	Connecticut	Walter Fuller Complex • St. Petersburg, Florida	9–4	Mascarello (1–0)	Fischer (0–1)	None	301	1–0	–
2	February 18	Cincinnati	Al Lang Stadium • St. Petersburg, Florida	6–0	Breedlove (1–0)	Ring (0–1)	None	224	2–0	–
3	February 19	Notre Dame	Al Lang Stadium • St. Petersburg, Florida	15–8	Collins (1–0)	Richter (0–1)	None	321	3–0	–
4	February 25	#20 East Carolina	Clark–LeClair Stadium • Greenville, North Carolina	6–4	Haase (1–0)	Brandt (1–1)	Wittgren (1)	–	4–0	–
5	February 25	Maryland	Clark–LeClair Stadium • Greenville, North Carolina	1–11	Carroll (1–0)	Breedlove (1–1)	None	3,108	4–1	–
6	February 25	Western Carolina	Clark–LeClair Stadium • Greenville, North Carolina	14–7	Andrzejewski (1–0)	Nadale (0–1)	None	–	5–1	–

March

#	Date	Opponent	Site/stadium	Score	Win	Loss	Save	Attendance	Overall record	B1G record
7	March 2	Auburn	Samford Stadium – Hitchcock Field at Plainsman Park • Auburn, Alabama	9–8	Mascarello (2–0)	Ortman (0–1)	Wittgren (2)	2,924	6–1	–
8	March 3	Southern Miss	Samford Stadium – Hitchcock Field at Plainsman Park • Auburn, Alabama	10–9	DeAno (1–0)	Giannini (1–1)	None	–	7–1	–
9	March 4	Charleston Southern	Samford Stadium – Hitchcock Field at Plainsman Park • Auburn, Alabama	5–2	Gunter (1–0)	Dolan (1–1)	Wittgren (3)	–	8–1	–
10	March 9	Murray State	Reagan Field • Murray, Kentucky	5–2	Mascarello (3–0)	Beers (1–1)	None	127	9–1	–
11	March 10	Murray State	Reagan Field • Murray, Kentucky	22–1	Breedlove (2–1)	Finch (2–1)	None	167	10–1	–
12	March 11	Murray State	Reagan Field • Murray, Kentucky	13–2	Gunter (2–0)	Vonder Haar (1–2)	None	151	11–1	–
13	March 13	Missouri State	Hammons Field • Springfield, Missouri	5–2	Mascarello (4–0)	Murphy (2–1)	Wittgren (4)	1,575	12–1	–
14	March 15	Wichita State	Eck Stadium • Wichita, Kansas	8–3	DeAno (2–0)	Vielock (0–1)	None	2,427	13–1	–
15	March 16	Wichita State	Eck Stadium • Wichita, Kansas	10–5	Haase (2–0)	Minnis (1–3)	None	2,559	14–1	–
16	March 17	Wichita State	Eck Stadium • Wichita, Kansas	2–8	Smith (3–1)	Breedlove (2–2)	Vielock (1)	–	14–2	–
17	March 17	Wichita State	Eck Stadium • Wichita, Kansasy	3–5	Ladwig (2–1)	Mascarello (4–1)	Elam (5)	2,875	14–3	–
18	March 24	Ohio State	Bill Davis Stadium • Columbus, Ohio	8–5	Haase (3–0)	Long (0–1)	Mascarello (1)	–	15–3	1–0
19	March 24	Ohio State	Bill Davis Stadium • Columbus, Ohio	8–1	Breedlove (3–2)	King (2–2)	None	1,018	16–3	2–0
20	March 25	Ohio State	Bill Davis Stadium • Columbus, Ohio	4–5	Kuchno (4–1)	DeAno (2–1)	None	798	16–4	2–1
21	March 27	#15 Louisville	Lambert Field • West Lafayette, Indiana	2–1	Mascarello (5–1)	Self (0–1)	None	763	17–4	2–1
22	March 28	IPFW	Lambert Field • West Lafayette, Indiana	2–1	Ramer (1–0)	Tursell (0–3)	None	389	18–4	2–1
23	March 30	Penn State	Lambert Field • West Lafayette, Indiana	9–3	Haase (4–0)	Walter (0–5)	None	572	19–4	3–1
24	March 31	Penn State	Lambert Field • West Lafayette, Indiana	2–0	Breedlove (4–2)	Kurrasch (1–2)	None	707	20–4	4–1

April

#	Date	Opponent	Site/stadium	Score	Win	Loss	Save	Attendance	Overall record	B1G record
25	April 1	Penn State	Lambert Field • West Lafayette, Indiana	6–16	Hill (1–3)	Gunter (2–1)	None	623	20–5	4–2
26	April 4	Anderson (IN)	Victory Field • Indianapolis, Indiana	6–1	Ramer (2–0)	Vogt (3–2)	None	778	21–5	4–2
27	April 6	Northwestern	Rocky Miller Park • Evanston, Illinois	3–1	Haase (5–0)	Brooke (1–3)	None	–	22–5	5–2
28	April 7	Northwestern	Rocky Miller Park • Evanston, Illinois	3–1	Breedlove (5–2)	Magallones (5–1)	Wittgren (5)	623	23–5	6–2
29	April 8	Northwestern	Rocky Miller Park • Evanston, Illinois	8–4	Podkul (1–0)	Morton (1–6)	None	282	24–5	7–2
30	April 11	Ball State	Ball Diamond • Muncie, Indiana	15–2	Ramer (3–0)	Brewer (0–3)	None	–	25–5	7–2
31	April 13	Illinois	Lambert Field • West Lafayette, Indiana	3–0	Haase (6–0)	Johnson (5–3)	Wittgren (6)	551	26–5	8–2
32	April 15	Illinois	Lambert Field • West Lafayette, Indiana	4–1	Breedlove (6–2)	Kravitz (5–3)	Wittgren (7)	–	27–5	9–2
33	April 15	Illinois	Lambert Field • West Lafayette, Indiana	5–3	Mascarello (6–1)	Milroy (1–4)	None	624	28–5	10–2
34	April 17	UIC	Les Miller Field at Curtis Granderson Stadium • Chicago, Illinois	15–2	Ramer (4–0)	Salemi (0–4)	None	139	29–5	10–2
35	April 20	Nebraska	Haymarket Park • Lincoln, Nebraska	8–5	Mascarello (7–1)	Niederklein (2–2)	None	4,702	30–5	11–2
36	April 21	Nebraska	Haymarket Park • Lincoln, Nebraska	3–8	Pierce (5–1)	Breedlove (6–3)	None	6,247	30–6	11–3
37	April 22	Nebraska	Haymarket Park • Lincoln, Nebraska	8–3	Podkul (2–0)	Hirsch (4–3)	None	6,014	31–6	12–3
38	April 24	Illinois State	Duffy Bass Field • Normal, Illinois	3–2	Ramer (5–0)	Sorkin (2–3)	Wittgren (9)	413	32–6	12–3
39	April 27	Michigan State	Lambert Field • West Lafayette, Indiana	6–2	Haase (7–0)	Bucciferro (3–3)	None	772	33–6	13–3
40	April 28	Michigan State	Lambert Field • West Lafayette, Indiana	4–3	Mascarello (8–1)	Popp (2–1)	None	–	34–6	14–3
41	April 29	Michigan State	Lambert Field • West Lafayette, Indiana	0–5	Garner (3–3)	Podkul (2–1)	None	757	34–7	14–4

May

#	Date	Opponent	Site/stadium	Score	Win	Loss	Save	Attendance	Overall record	B1G record
42	May 5	#14 UCLA	Jackie Robinson Stadium • Los Angeles, California	1–5	Plutko (6–3)	Haase (7–1)	None	–	34–8	14–4
43	May 5	#14 UCLA	Jackie Robinson Stadium • Los Angeles, California	2–3	Vander Tuig (6–3)	Breedlove (6–4)	Griggs	1,374	34–9	14–4
44	May 6	#14 UCLA	Jackie Robinson Stadium • Los Angeles, California	15–11	Wittgren (1–0)	Watson (8–2)	None	1,529	35–9	14–4
45	May 8	IPFW	Parkview Field • Fort Wayne, Indiana	11–4	Gannon (1–0)	Kimball (0–3)	None	848	36–9	14–4
46	May 9	UIC	Lambert Field • West Lafayette, Indiana	11–4	Ramer (6–0)	Suminski (1–1)	None	333	37–9	14–4
47	May 11	Michigan	Lambert Field • West Lafayette, Indiana	4–0	Haase (8–1)	Sinnery (4–5)	None	667	38–9	15–4
48	May 12	Michigan	Lambert Field • West Lafayette, Indiana	14–3	Breedlove (7–4)	Lakatos (0–6)	None	–	39–9	16–4
49	May 13	Michigan	Lambert Field • West Lafayette, Indiana	3–4	Ballantine (2–3)	Podkul (2–2)	Brosnahan (1)	631	39–10	16–5
50	May 15	Indiana State	Lambert Field • Lafayette, Indiana	2–1	Wittgren (2–0)	Machado (0–2)	None	771	40–10	16–5
51	May 17	Iowa	Duane Banks Field • Iowa City, Iowa	11–8	Haase (9–1)	Dermody (1–7)	Mascarello (2)	546	41–10	17–5
52	May 18	Iowa	Duane Banks Field • Iowa City, Iowa	1–6	Kuebel (6–0)	Breedlove (7–5)	None	1,260	41–11	17–6
53	May 19	Iowa	Duane Banks Field • Iowa City, Iowa	6–7	Hippen (4–7)	Podkul (2–3)	Brown (7)	770	41–12	17–7

Postseason
B1G Tournament

#	Date	Opponent	Site/stadium	Score	Win	Loss	Save	Attendance	Overall record	B1G record
54	May 24	Ohio State	Huntington Park • Columbus, Ohio	5–4	Haase (10–1)	Kuchno (8–4)	Wittgren (10)	2,257	42–12	17–7
55	May 25	Indiana	Huntington Park • Columbus, Ohio	3–0	Breedlove (8–5)	Hart (5–5)	Mascarello (3)	1,200	43–12	17–7
56	May 26	Indiana	Huntington Park • Columbus, Ohio	6–5	Wittgren (3–0)	Hoffman (8–2)	None	–	44–12	17–7

Postseason
Gary Regional

#	Date	Opponent	Site/stadium	Score	Win	Loss	Save	Attendance	Overall record	B1G record
57	June 1	Valparaiso	U.S. Steel Yard • Gary, Indiana	7–2	Haase (11–1)	Deetjen (8–3)	None	5,047	45–12	17–7
58	June 2	#25 Kent State	U.S. Steel Yard • Gary, Indiana	3–7	Bores (9–5)	Breedlove (8–6)	None	2,610	45–13	17–7
59	June 3	#11 Kentucky	U.S. Steel Yard • Gary, Indiana	3–6	Littrell (9–2)	Rammer (6–1)	Phillips (8)	1,492	45–14	17–7
