= Darin Erstad =

American baseball player and coach (born 1974)

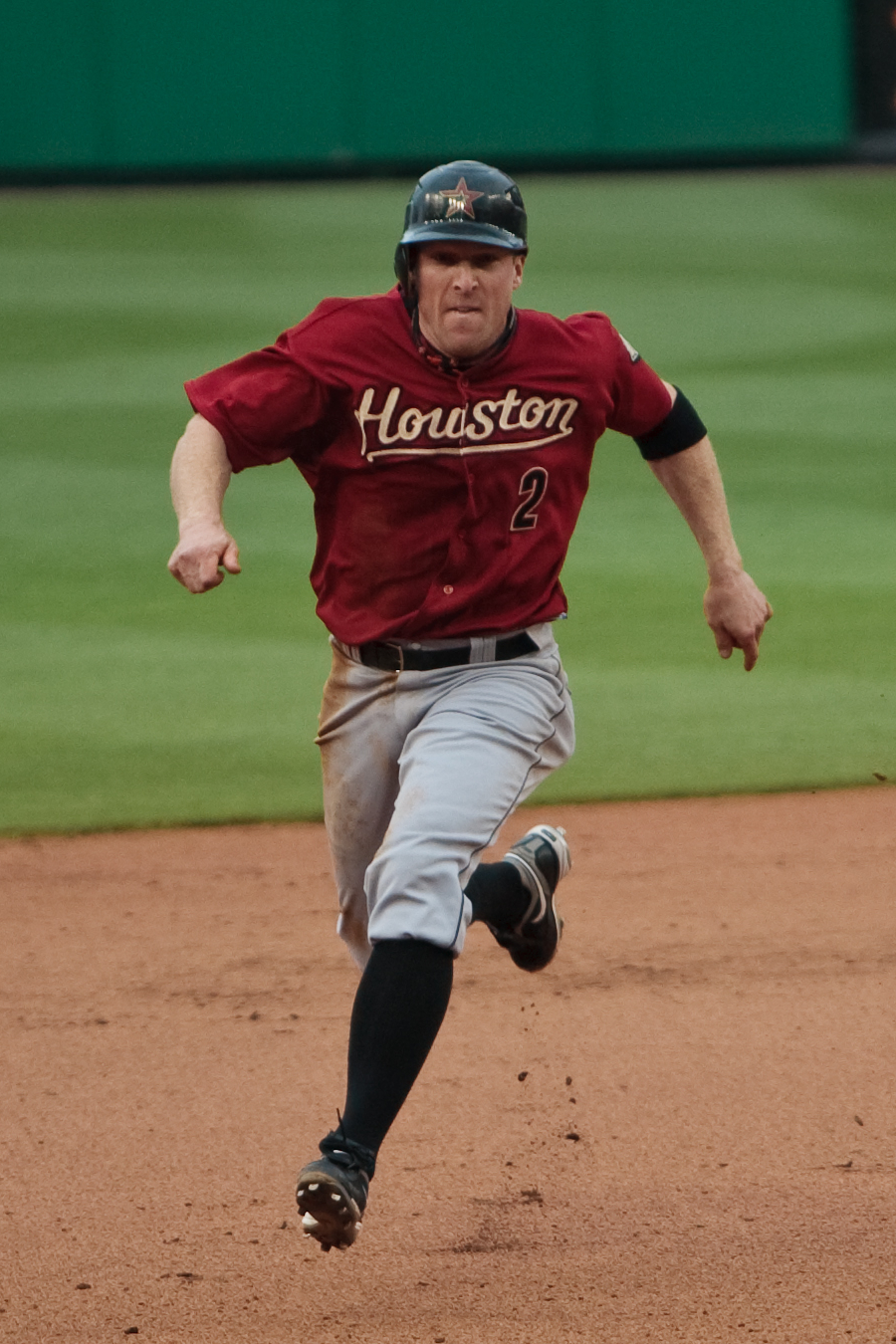
- Erstad with the Houston Astros in 2009
- Outfielder / First baseman
- Born: June 4, 1974 (age 52); Jamestown, North Dakota, U.S.
- Batted: Left Threw: Left

MLB debut
- June 14, 1996, for the California Angels

Last MLB appearance
- October 4, 2009, for the Houston Astros

MLB statistics
- Batting average: .282
- Home runs: 124
- Runs batted in: 699
- Stats at Baseball Reference

Teams
- California / Anaheim / Los Angeles Angels of Anaheim (1996–2006); Chicago White Sox (2007); Houston Astros (2008–2009)

Career highlights and awards
- 2× All-Star (1998, 2000); World Series champion (2002); 3× Gold Glove Award (2000, 2002, 2004); Silver Slugger Award (2000)

Darin Charles Erstad (/ˈdærən ˈɜːrstæt/; born June 4, 1974) is an American former professional baseball player and former head coach of the Nebraska Cornhuskers. Erstad spent most of his playing career with the Los Angeles Angels of Anaheim franchise (1996–2006) before signing with the Chicago White Sox in 2007. Erstad batted and threw left-handed. He was a two-time MLB All-Star and a three-time Gold Glove Award winner. He was the first overall pick in the 1995 Major League Baseball draft.

== Early life ==
=== High school ===
Erstad graduated in 1992 from Jamestown High School in Jamestown, North Dakota. He was a placekicker and punter on the school football team, logging a school-record 50-yard field goal. Erstad also played hockey (36 goals and 24 assists in 26 games) and participated in track and field (winning state titles in 110 and 300-meter hurdles).

Erstad played American Legion Baseball (Jamestown had no high school baseball team) and hit .492 with 18 home runs and 86 RBI for Jamestown in 1992. He was also 10–2 with a 2.18 ERA as a pitcher, and was named AP North Dakota Athlete of the Year in 1992.

=== College ===
Erstad attended the University of Nebraska–Lincoln, playing baseball there for three years and held the school record for career hits with 261. In his final year there, Erstad hit .410 with 19 home runs and 79 RBIs, earning First-Team All-American status and was a finalist for the 1995 Golden Spikes Award.

Darin started his junior campaign on a tear and never stopped hitting. He was at his best against the conference's top team, Oklahoma. In five games with the first-place Sooners, he batted .429 and blasted three home runs. Oklahoma lefty Mark Redman—with whom Darin would share conference Player of the Year honors—was among his biggest victims. The Huskers finished 35–23, and Darin led the Big Eight with a .410 average. He was the only batter in the conference to surpass 100 hits, and also led all players with seven triples. Named a First Team All-American by Collegiate Baseball, Darin set career highs with 19 homers and 76 RBIs.

In 1993 and 1994, Erstad played collegiate summer baseball with the Falmouth Commodores of the Cape Cod Baseball League (CCBL). He was named league MVP in 1994 and in 2001 was inducted into the CCBL Hall of Fame.

Erstad was also the starting punter on the Cornhuskers football team and was part of their 1994 National Championship squad, averaging 42.6 yards per punt, the 14th best mark in the country that year.

== Professional career ==
In his 14-season career, Erstad compiled a .282 batting average with 124 home runs and 699 RBIs in 1654 games. His career .9955 fielding percentage as an outfielder is second all-time through 2019 behind Jon Jay and his .9968 fielding percentage as a centerfielder is first all time. He was selected to the American League All-Star team twice (1998, 2000) and had eight game-ending walk-off RBI in his career.

=== Angels ===
==== 1995–2000 ====
The then California Angels chose Erstad as the first pick overall in the 1995 Major League Baseball draft from the University of Nebraska–Lincoln. He made his major league debut the next year, batting .284 over 57 games. Erstad played his first full season in 1997, batting .299 with 16 home runs and 99 runs scored. Posting similarly solid statistics the next year, Erstad made his first of two All-Star appearances before having a disappointing season in 1999.

Erstad had a career season in 2000, when he finished eighth in the American League in MVP voting. That year, he led the American League in hits (240), singles (170) and at-bats (676); he was second in total bases (366) and third in runs (121). Erstad also hit .355, finishing second in the batting race behind Nomar Garciaparra (.372), became the first player in Major League history to record 100 RBIs as a leadoff hitter, and won the AL Silver Slugger Award. Erstad's 240 hits in 2000 remain the most in a single-season for any player in the 21st century not including Ichiro Suzuki (who did it twice, hitting 242 in 2001 and an MLB record 262 in 2004).

On June 10, 2000, Erstad hit a double in the Angels' 10–3 win over Arizona. With a major league-leading 100 hits in 61 games, he became the fastest to reach the 100-hit mark since Hall of Famer Heinie Manush did it in 60 games for the 1934 Washington Senators. With three hits on August 29, 2000, he reached 200 hits faster than any player in 65 years. Erstad was just 26 years old at the end of the season, an age at which many players enter their prime, leading many to believe more superstar seasons were ahead of him.

Erstad is one of only six or seven batters to have hit both a leadoff and walk-off home run in the same game, the others being Billy Hamilton (1893, disputed), Vic Power (1957), Reed Johnson (2003), Ian Kinsler (2009), Chris Young (2010), and Pete Crow-Armstrong (2026).

==== 2001–2006 ====
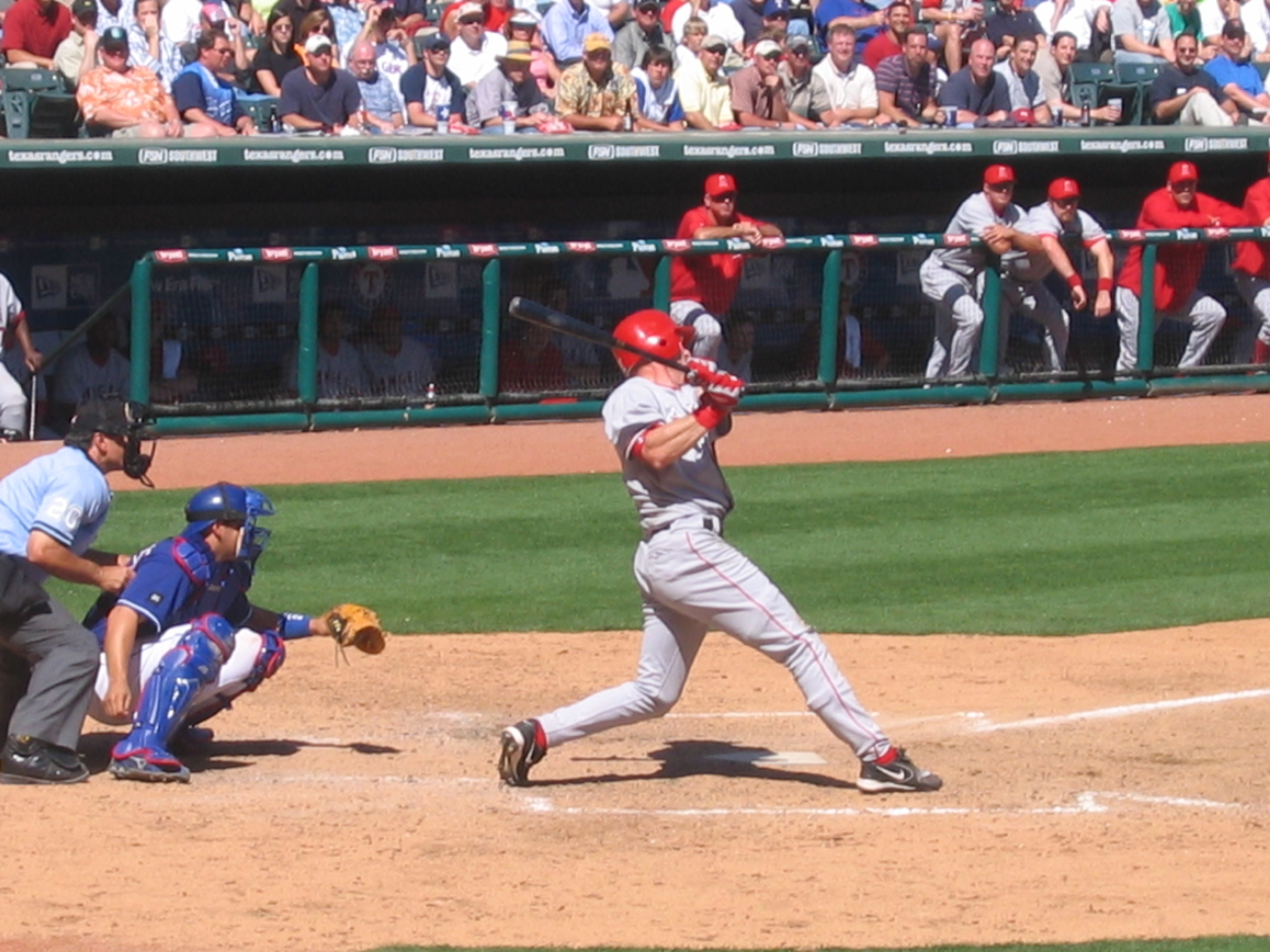
Erstad hits a home run for the Angels.

Although Erstad never hit .300 again after the 2000 season, he was a vital part of the 2002 World Series Champion Angels. After batting .421 in the American League Division Series against the New York Yankees and .364 in the American League Championship Series against the Minnesota Twins, Erstad batted .300 in the seven-game series vs. the National League Champion San Francisco Giants. He hit a key home run in Game 6 of the series with the Angels trailing, 5–3, in the eighth inning and facing elimination, and he also caught the final out of Game 7 hit by Kenny Lofton off Troy Percival into center field. When the Angels won the World Series in 2002, Erstad became the second player hailing from North Dakota to be on a World Series winning roster. Roger Maris was the first with the 1961 Yankees and 1967 Cardinals.

Throughout Erstad's Angels career, his defense remained exceptionally strong. He led all major league center fielders in range factor (3.39) in 2002. Erstad won Gold Glove awards in 2000, 2002, and 2004, when he made a transition from the outfield to first base. He is the only player in MLB history to have won Gold Gloves as an infielder and as an outfielder. He was also the first to win the award at different positions (though all outfield Gold Gloves are voted on together) until Plácido Polanco won an NL Gold Glove as a third baseman for the Philadelphia Phillies in 2011 after having won two Gold Gloves as a second baseman, thus both being infield awards.

Though he compiled a career high 21 game hit streak in 2005, he only played in 40 games in 2006, his last season with the Angels. In 11 years with the franchise, Erstad compiled a .286 batting average and a cumulative .339 postseason average over three seasons. He currently ranks near the top of several franchise records.

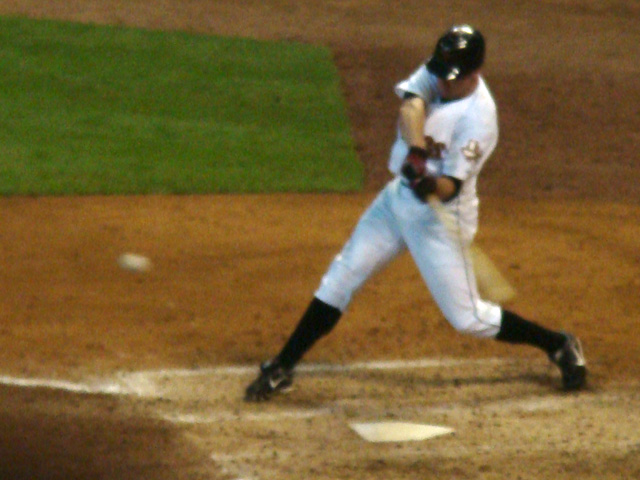
Erstad batting for the Astros

=== White Sox and Astros ===
Having signed a $750,000 contract in the off-season, Erstad hit a home run in his first at-bat as a member of the Chicago White Sox on opening day 2007 off CC Sabathia. He finished the season having batted .248 with a .650 OPS over 87 games. He played the following two seasons with the Houston Astros. Erstad found success in the first season, batting .276, but struggled near the end of the second season as a role player, ending the season with a .194 batting average. When catcher Chris Coste joined Erstad on the Astros roster in July 2009, they became the first two players born in North Dakota to play together on the same team in major league history.

On June 17, 2010, when asked if he would continue playing baseball, Erstad said that he was "done".

Erstad was on the 2015 ballot to be inducted into the Baseball Hall of Fame. Erstad received one vote and fell off the ballot.

== Coaching career ==
Darin Erstad
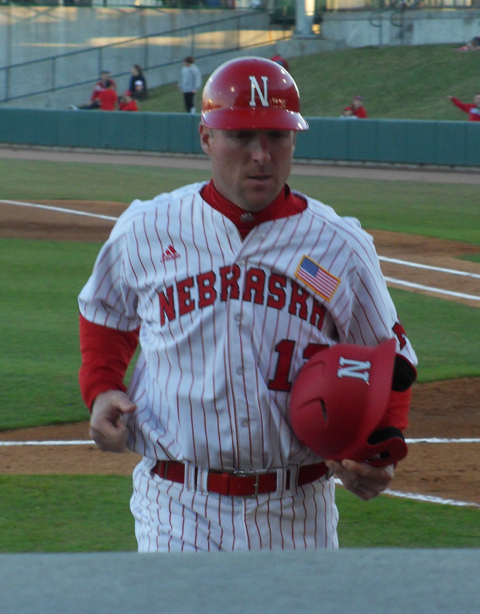

Biographical details
- Born: June 4, 1974 (age 52); Jamestown, North Dakota

Playing career
- 1993–95: Nebraska Cornhuskers
- Position: OF

Coaching career (HC unless noted)
- 2011: Nebraska (Volunteer Asst.)
- 2012–2019: Nebraska

Head coaching record
- Overall: 267–193–1 (.580)
- Tournaments: Big Ten: 12–13; NCAA: 2–8

Accomplishments and honors

Championships
- Big Ten Regular season (2017)

Awards
- Big Ten Coach of the Year (2017)

On July 5, 2010, the Lincoln Journal Star reported that Erstad accepted a position to become a volunteer coach for the Nebraska baseball team. On July 8, Nebraska head baseball coach Mike Anderson revealed Erstad as the college team's next hitting coach. On June 2, 2011, after Anderson was fired, Erstad was hired as Nebraska's head baseball coach. Erstad was named the 23rd head coach of the Nebraska baseball program.

During his eight years as head coach, the Huskers made four NCAA tournament appearances and qualified for the Big Ten Tournament seven times. He had a coaching record of 267-193-1, which was the fourth-best in Nebraska baseball history for a head coach.

Erstad was named Big Ten Coach of the Year in 2017 after leading the Huskers to the conference championship during the regular season. Six times, Nebraska finished in the top four of the conference standings, including four times in the top two. Three times, Nebraska finished second in the Big Ten Tournament.

Erstad resigned as coach of the Nebraska Cornhuskers after eight seasons on June 3, 2019.

=== Head coaching record ===
Conference champion

Season	Team	Overall	Conference	Standing	Postseason
Nebraska Cornhuskers (Big Ten Conference) (2012–2019)
2012	Nebraska	35–23	14–10	4th	Big Ten tournament
2013	Nebraska	29–30	15–9	T–2nd	Big Ten tournament
2014	Nebraska	41–21	18–6	2nd	NCAA Regional
2015	Nebraska	34–23	9–14	8th	Big Ten tournament
2016	Nebraska	37–22	16–8	2nd	NCAA Regional
2017	Nebraska	35–22–1	16–7–1	1st	NCAA Regional
2018	Nebraska	24–28	8–14	10th	
2019	Nebraska	32–24	15–9	T–3rd	NCAA Regional
Nebraska:		267–193–1	111–77–1		

== Personal and hometown ==
Erstad has three children with his wife, Jessica: a daughter, Jordan Elizabeth, and two sons, Zack and Adam.

During Erstad's tenure with the Angels, his hometown carried all Angels games over the radio; most North Dakota stations only carry Minnesota Twins games. As of July 2009, he ranked second to Travis Hafner in all-time home runs hit by a player born in North Dakota.

== See also ==
- List of Major League Baseball career stolen bases leaders
