= Riverview Health Arena at Innovation Mile =

Arena in Noblesville, Indiana, U.S.

- Interactive map of Riverview Health Arena at Innovation Mile
- Former names: Noblesville Event Center (2023–2025); The Arena at Innovation Mile (2025–2026)
- Address: 14157 CJ Way
- Location: Noblesville, Indiana, U.S.
- Coordinates: 39°59′35.3″N 85°54′54″W
- Owner: City of Noblesville
- Operator: Patch Development
- Capacity: 3,400

Construction
- Groundbreaking: Fall 2023
- Cost: $40 million

Tenant
- Noblesville Boom (NBAGL) (2025–)

Website
- www.arenainnovationmile.com

Riverview Health Arena at Innovation Mile is an indoor arena in Noblesville, Indiana, United States. Owned by the city of Noblesville, it has a capacity of 3,400 and opened in the summer of 2025. The arena serves as the home venue for the Noblesville Boom, the NBA G League affiliate of the NBA's Indiana Pacers, and debuted during the 2025–26 G League season.

== History ==
Originally named Noblesville Event Center from 2023 to 2025 and slated to be built in the Finch Creek Park area, the arena was instead built at the intersection of 141st Street and I-69, east of Olio Road and initially called The Arena at Innovation Mile. The arena hosts live music and entertainment as well as community sports, events, and conferences. The arena opened on August 8, 2025, during Noblesville's State of the City event. On March 26, 2026, the arena announced that Riverview Health had obtained naming rights for 10 years, renaming the arena to Riverview Health Arena at Innovation Mile.

== NBA G League ==
With the recent trend of NBA teams moving their NBA G League affiliate teams closer to their local home markets, the Indiana Pacers announced on May 8, 2023, that they would move their G League affiliate, the Fort Wayne Mad Ants, from Fort Wayne, Indiana, to Noblesville to play in the proposed arena. To prepare for construction of the new Noblesville arena, the Mad Ants temporarily moved to Indianapolis to play at Gainbridge Fieldhouse, splitting time with the Pacers, for the 2023–24 and 2024–25 G League seasons. During its time at Gainbridge Fieldhouse, the franchise rebranded as the Indiana Mad Ants, with a new name, color scheme, and mascot to be introduced upon moving to Noblesville. On April 16, 2025, the franchise officially rebranded as the Noblesville Boom prior to the 2025–26 season, their first at the arena.

== See also ==
- List of indoor arenas in the United States
