= Riverview Health Noblesville Hospital =

Riverview Health

Geography
- Location: 395 Westfield Rd, Noblesville, Hamilton County, Indiana, United States
- Coordinates: 40.045961°N 86.023634°W

Organization
- Type: Community
- Network: Riverview Medical Group

Services
- Beds: 161

History
- Founded: 1909

Links
- Website: www.riverview.org
- Lists: Hospitals in Indiana

Riverview Health Noblesville Hospital (formally known as Riverview Hospital) is a hospital located in Noblesville, Indiana, in the United States. It is part of the Riverview Medical Group hospital network. Founded in 1909, it was the first hospital in Hamilton County and as of 2015, it was one of the largest employers in the county. It has 156 beds and employees over 350 medical professionals.

== History ==
The hospital was founded in 1909 as the Harrell Hospital and Sanatorium. It was the first hospital in Hamilton County. It was built by Samuel Harrell. Harrell sold the hospital to the county in 1914. This made it the first hospital in the state owned by a county. The hospital provides services to Hamilton County and Tipton County. In 2014, Riverview Hospital changed its name to Riverview Health. That same year, the hospital agreed to pay $1.2 million for ten years for the naming rights to Westfield High School's football stadium. On March 26, 2026, the hospital announced a naming rights deal to rename the former Arena at Innovation Mile in Noblesville, home of the NBA G-League team the Noblesville Boom, to Riverview Health Arena at Innovation Mile.

As of 2012, the hospital was the 3rd least profitable hospital in the state.
