= 2012 California Golden Bears baseball team =

American college baseball season

2012 California Golden Bears baseball
- Conference: Pac-12 Conference

Ranking
- Coaches: No. 21
- Record: 9–2 (0–0 Pac-12)
- Head coach: David Esquer (13th season)
- Assistant coaches: Tony Arnerich (3rd season); Mike Neu (1st season); Brad Sanfilippo (3rd season)
- Home stadium: Evans Diamond

2012 Pac-12 Conference baseball standings
	Conf.				Overall
Team	W		L	PCT	W		L	PCT
No. 4 UCLA ‍†‍‍^{y}	20	–	10	.667	48	–	16	.750
No. 11 Arizona ‍‍‍^{y}	20	–	10	.667	48	–	17	.738
No. 10 Oregon ‍‍‍^{y}	19	–	11	.633	46	–	19	.708
No. 13 Stanford ‍‍‍^{y}	18	–	12	.600	41	–	18	.695
No. 17 Oregon State ‍‍‍^{y}	18	–	12	.600	40	–	20	.667
Arizona State ‍‍‍	18	–	12	.600	36	–	20	.643
Washington ‍‍‍	13	–	17	.433	30	–	25	.545
California ‍‍‍	12	–	18	.400	29	–	25	.537
Washington State ‍‍‍	12	–	18	.400	28	–	28	.500
USC ‍‍‍	8	–	22	.267	23	–	32	.418
Utah ‍‍‍	7	–	23	.233	14	–	42	.250
† – Conference champion y – Invited to the 2012 NCAA Division I baseball tournament As of May 28, 2012; Rankings from Coaches' Poll

The 2012 California Golden Bears baseball team is the representative of the University of California, Berkeley in the 2012 NCAA Division I baseball season. The team plays their home games in Evans Diamond. They entered the 2012 season after making the 2011 College World Series with a 35–21 record in 2011 and making the postseason three of the last four years.

== Previous season ==
California finished the 2011 regular season as the #6 team in the Pac-12 Conference with a 25–21 record, and made it to the 2011 College World Series finishing tied for 5th place. The program also staved off elimination as a varsity program in 2011 by raising approximately 10 million dollars in a little more than a month. The funds raised were able to keep the California baseball program running and set up the Cal Baseball Foundation to try to keep the program running into perpetuity. The university also had planned to eliminate Rugby, Men's and Women's Gymnastics, and Women's Lacrosse, but enough funds were raised to save those programs as well.

== Schedule ==
The season for California will begin on Friday, February 17 with a home game against Pacific with a three-game series, two of which will be in Berkeley. Their longest home stand will be from March 13–22, and May 11–20 (8 home games), and their longest road trip was from March 20-April 7 (12 road games). Their final game of the regular season will be on Saturday, May 27 in Palo Alto against arch-rival Stanford. In 2011, the California Golden Bears baseball team won an at-large berth to the 2011 NCAA Division I baseball tournament and advanced to the Super Regionals. California then swept Dallas Baptist in Santa Clara to clinch a berth to the College World Series for the first time since 1992. The Bears will look to repeat and build upon that success in 2012.

2012 California Golden Bears baseball game log
February: 5–2 (Conference: 0–0; Home: 3–0; Road: 2–2)

#	Date	Opponent	Score	Rank	Win	Loss	Save	Attendance	Record	Stadium	Box
1	February 17	Pacific	9–1	#22	J. Jones (1–0)	T. Lumby (0–1)		602	1–0	Evans Diamond	W1
2	February 18	@ Pacific	6–3	#22	M. Flemer (1–0)	M. Hager (0–1)	L. Scott (1)	838	2–0	Klein Family Field	W2
3	February 19	Pacific	9–3	#22	L. Scott (1–0)	J. Matthews (0–1)		775	3–0	Evans Diamond	W3
4	February 24	@ Long Beach State	7–4	#22	S. Stuart (1–0)	J. Jones (1–1)	J. Stassi (1)	1,204	3–1	Blair Field	L1
5	February 25	@ Long Beach State	2–1 (10)	#22	L. Scott (2–0)	J. Frye (0–1)		1,180	4–1	Blair Field	W1
6	February 26	@ Long Beach State	2–1	#22	R. Strufing (2–0)	M. Theofanopoulos (0–1)	J. Maciel (1)	1,308	4–2	Blair Field	L1
7	February 28	San Francisco	5–3	RV	J. Donofrio (1–0)	J. Remer (1–1)	T. Hildenberger (1)	105	5–2	Evans Diamond	W1

March: 10–8 (Conference: 1–5; Home: 4–3; Road: 6–5)

#	Date	Opponent	Score	Rank	Win	Loss	Save	Attendance	Record	Stadium	Box
8	March 3	Lehigh	9–3	RV	J. Jones (2–1)	N. Cassell (1–1)		505	6–2	Evans Diamond	W2
9	March 4	Lehigh	10–0	RV	M. Flemer (2–0)	C. Gotzon (0–2)		355	7–2	Evans Diamond	W3
10	March 4	Lehigh	18–3	RV	K. Porter (1–0)	L. Porter (0–2)		440	8–2	Evans Diamond	W4 Archived 2016-03-04 at the Wayback Machine
11	March 6	Creighton	7–5	#21	J. Donofrio (2–0)	R. McGraw (2–2)	L. Scott (2)	116	9–2	Evans Diamond	W5
12	March 9	@ Nebraska	11–8 (11)	#21	L. Scott (3–0)	T. Huber (0–1)		2,723	10–2	Haymarket Park	W6
13	March 10	@ Nebraska	12–5	#21	J. Keller (2–0)	M. Flemer (2–1)		5,298	10–3	Haymarket Park	L1
14	March 11	@ Nebraska	4–0	#21	K. Porter (2–0)	T. Lemke (1–1)		2,351	11–3	Haymarket Park	W1
15	March 12	@ Nebraska	9–5	#18	T. Niederklein (2–1)	M. Theofanopoulos (0–2)		1,941	11–4	Haymarket Park	L1
	March 16	#24 Oregon State		#18	Postponed (rain); Rescheduled for March 17					Evans Diamond	
16	March 17	#24 Oregon State	9–2	#18	B. Wetzler (4–0)	J. Jones (2–2)		493	11–5	Evans Diamond	L2
17	March 17	#24 Oregon State	4–1	#18	D. Child (2–1)	M. Flemer (2–2)	T. Bryant (4)	550	11–6	Evans Diamond	L3
18	March 18	#24 Oregon State	13–5	#18	J. Fry (1–0)	K. Porter (2–1)		609	11–7	Evans Diamond	L4
19	March 20	@ San Francisco	4–3	RV	M. Theofanopoulos (1–2)	J. Remer (1–2)	L. Scott (3)	112	12–7	Benedetti Diamond	W1
20	March 23	@ Arizona State	5–1	RV	B. Rodgers (4–0)	J. Jones (2–3)		2,581	12–8	Packard Stadium	L1
21	March 24	@ Arizona State	3–2	RV	M. Flemer (3–2)	T. Williams (5–1)	L. Scott (4)	2,515	13–8	Packard Stadium	W1
22	March 25	@ Arizona State	9–6	RV	R. Ravago (1–0)	M. Theofanopoulos (1–3)	J. Barrett (3)	1,741	13–9	Packard Stadium	L1
23	March 25	@ Fresno State	7–6	RV	M. Theofanopoulos (2–3)	T. Harlan (3–4)		1,319	14–9	Pete Beiden Field	W1
24	March 30	@ #25 Texas	13–2	RV	N. Thornhill (3–2)	J. Jones (2–4)		2,970	14–10	Dell Diamond	L1
25	March 31	@ #25 Texas	12–2	RV	M. Flemer 4–2	P. French (3–1)		3,582	15–10	Dell Diamond	W1
	March 31	@ #25 Texas		RV	Cancelled (coaches' mutual decision)					Dell Diamond	

April: 8–8 (Conference: 6–6; Home: 6–2; Road: 2–6)

#	Date	Opponent	Score	Rank	Win	Loss	Save	Attendance	Record	Stadium	Box
26	April 1	@ #25 Texas	6–5	RV	J. Donofrio (3–0)	H. Milner (5–4)	L. Scott (6)	2,028	16–10	Dell Diamond	W2
27	April 5	@ USC	5–4	RV	C. Muse-Fisher (1–0)	W. Strahan (2–1)	J. Donofrio (1)	457	17–10	Dedeaux Field	W3
28	April 6	@ USC	2–1	RV	A. Triggs (3–3)	L. Scott (0–1)		918	17–11	Dedeaux Field	L1
29	April 7	@ USC	3–2	RV	W. Strahan (3–1)	J. Donofrio (3–1)		—	17–12	Dedeaux Field	L2
30	April 9	#5 Stanford	19–6		S. Bloom (1–0)	K. Siomkin (0–1)		763	17–13	Evans Diamond	L3
	April 10	Santa Clara			Postponed (rain); Rescheduled for April 11					Stephen Schott Stadium	
31	April 11	@ Santa Clara	8–5		C. Mendoza (1–0)	C. Muse-Fisher (1–1)	M. Deering (3)	261	17–14	Stephen Schott Stadium	L4
32	April 13	Washington	7–6		J. Donofrio (4–1)	A. West (4–3)		275	18–14	Evans Diamond	W1
33	April 14	Washington	5–2		M. Flemer (5–2)	Z. Wright (2–1)		694	19–14	Evans Diamond	W2
34	April 15	Washington	5–3		J. Fredendall (1–2)	J. Jones (2–5)		881	19–15	Evans Diamond	L1
35	April 17	Santa Clara	4–0		C. Muse-Fisher (2–1)	P. Twining (3–3)		132	20–15	Evans Diamond	W1
36	April 20	Utah	9–4		M. Theofanopoulos (3–3)	J. Pond (2–7)	L. Scott (7)	183	21–15	Evans Diamond	W2
37	April 21	Utah	9–0		M. Flemer (6–2)	B. Duke (2–2)		578	22–15	Evans Diamond	W3
38	April 22	Utah	5–2		J. Jones (3–5)	M. Watrous (2–2)	J. Donofrio (2)	705	23–15	Evans Diamond	W4
39	April 27	@ Oregon	4–1		A. Keudell (7–3)	L. Scott (3–2)		1,531	23–16	PK Park	
40	April 28	@ Oregon	3–2		J. Reed (5–2)	M. Flemer (6–3)	J. Sherfy (10)	3,892	23–17	PK Park	
41	April 29	@ Oregon	7–1		J. Gold (6–3)	J. Jones (3–6)		2,026	23–18	PK Park	

May: 6–7 (Conference: 5–7; Home: 2–5; Road: 4–2)

#	Date	Opponent	Score	Rank	Win	Loss	Save	Attendance	Record	Stadium	Box
42	May 4	@ Washington State	10–4		T. Chleborad (4-1)	M. Theofanopoulos (3–4)	K. Camus (2)	404	23–19	Bailey–Brayton Field	
43	May 5	@ Washington State	9–4		M. Flemer (7–3)	Pistorese, J (2-3)		409	24–19	Bailey–Brayton Field	
44	May 6	@ Washington State	8–0		Jones (4-6)	JD. Leckenby (4-5)		591	25–19	Bailey–Brayton Field	
45	May 11	Arizona	3–1		K. Heyer (9-2)	M. Theofanopoulos (3–5)		276	25–20	Evans Diamond	
46	May 12	Arizona	4–1		K. Wade (7-1)	M. Flemer (7–4)		474	25–21	Evans Diamond	
47	May 13	Arizona	7–4		T. Hale (2-0)	J. Jones (4-7)	T. Crawford (1)	774	25–22	Evans Diamond	
48	May 14	Washington State	13–8		J. Donofrio (5-1)	S. Jackson (1-1)		114	26–22	Evans Diamond	
50	May 18	UCLA	7–2		A. Plutko (8-3)	M. Flemer (7-5)		412	26–23	Evans Diamond	
51	May 19	UCLA	8–5		N. Vander Tuig (8-3)	J. Jones (4-8)	S. Griggs (14)	613	26–24	Evans Diamond	
52	May 20	UCLA	6–5		J. Donofrio (6-1)	D. Berg (5-3)		1,087	27–24	Evans Diamond	
53	May 25	@ Stanford	5–4		L. Scott (4-2)	D. McArdle (3-3)	J. Jones (1)	2,743	28–24	Sunken Diamond	
54	May 26	@ Stanford	15–5		C. Muse-Fisher (3-1)	B. Mooneyham (7-5)	K. Siomkin (1)	2,955	29–24	Sunken Diamond	
56	May 27	@ Stanford	5–3		S. Piscotty (5-2)	J. Jones (4-9)	S. Bloom (1)	2,864	29–25	Sunken Diamond	

Legend
California Win	California Loss

Home	Away

*All Rankings are from the USA Today Coaches' Poll

== Roster ==
2012 California Golden Bears baseball team
Players
Coaches

#	Pos.	Name	B/T	Height	Weight	Year	Previous school	Home town
43	RHP	Joey Donofrio	R/R	6 ft 3 in (1.91 m)	195 lb (88 kg)	Sr	Los Gatos HS	Los Gatos, CA
18	LHP	Matt Evanoff	L/L	6 ft 2 in (1.88 m)	208 lb (94 kg)	So	Ponderosa HS	Rescue, CA
49	RHP	Matt Flemer	R/R	6 ft 2 in (1.88 m)	216 lb (98 kg)	Sr	St. Mary's HS	El Cerrito, CA
26	RHP	Trevor Hildenberger	R/R	6 ft 2 in (1.88 m)	175 lb (79 kg)	So	Archbishop Mitty HS	San Jose, CA
23	LHP	Justin Jones	L/L	6 ft 2 in (1.88 m)	188 lb (85 kg)	Jr	Oakdale HS	Oakdale, CA
35	RHP	Michael Jordan	/R	6 ft 1 in (1.85 m)	210 lb (95 kg)	Fr	Murrieta Valley HS	Murrieta, CA
29	RHP	Michael Lowden	R/R	6 ft 2 in (1.88 m)	175 lb (79 kg)	So	Yuba City HS	Yuba City, CA
31	LHP	Chris Muse-Fisher	/L	6 ft 0 in (1.83 m)	170 lb (77 kg)	Fr	Oak Ridge HS	El Dorado Hills, CA
21	RHP	Stephen Pistoresi	R/R	6 ft 1 in (1.85 m)	195 lb (88 kg)	Sr	San Joaquin Memorial HS	Fresno, CA
16	LHP	Kyle Porter	L/L	6 ft 2 in (1.88 m)	192 lb (87 kg)	So	Oakridge HS	El Dorado Hills, CA
36	RHP	Ryan Sandler	R/R	6 ft 2 in (1.88 m)	210 lb (95 kg)	So	Canyon Crest Academy	Solana Beach, CA
20	RHP	Logan Scott	R/R	6 ft 4 in (1.93 m)	216 lb (98 kg)	Jr	Serra HS	San Mateo, CA
28	RHP	Keaton Siomkin	/R	5 ft 11 in (1.8 m)	200 lb (91 kg)	Fr	JSerra HS	Ladera Ranch, CA
24	RHP	Seth Spivack	S/R	6 ft 0 in (1.83 m)	196 lb (89 kg)	Fr	Taft HS	Calabasas, CA
10	LHP	Michael Theofanopoulos	L/L	5 ft 10 in (1.78 m)	191 lb (87 kg)	So	Foothill HS	Pleasanton, CA
32	RHP	Eric Walbridge	R/R	5 ft 10 in (1.78 m)	185 lb (84 kg)	Fr	Notre Dame HS	Los Angeles, CA
47	LHP	Robb Woodcock	/L	6 ft 4 in (1.93 m)	195 lb (88 kg)	Fr	Marin Catholic HS	Greenbrae, CA
9	C	Alex Egber	R/R	6 ft 1 in (1.85 m)	195 lb (88 kg)	So	Montgomery Blair HS	Potomac, MD
6	C	Andrew Knapp	S/R	6 ft 1 in (1.85 m)	191 lb (87 kg)	So	Granite Bay HS	Granite Bay, CA
27	C	Chadd Krist	R/R	5 ft 11 in (1.8 m)	199 lb (90 kg)	Sr	Petaluma HS	Petaluma, CA
5	INF	Derek Campbell	R/R	6 ft 0 in (1.83 m)	172 lb (78 kg)	So	Mater Dei HS	Irvine, CA
44	INF	Mitch Delfino	R/R	6 ft 3 in (1.91 m)	209 lb (95 kg)	Jr	Cloverdale HS	Cloverdale, CA
1	INF	Brendan Farney	/	5 ft 10 in (1.78 m)	190 lb (86 kg)	Fr	Vacaville HS	Fairfield, CA
6	INF	Chris Paul	/	6 ft 2 in (1.88 m)	185 lb (84 kg)	Fr	Laguna Beach HS	Aliso Viejo, CA
14	INF	Tony Renda	R/R	5 ft 8 in (1.73 m)	173 lb (78 kg)	Jr	Serra HS	Hillsborough, CA
33	INF	Devon Rodriguez	L/R	6 ft 2 in (1.88 m)	209 lb (95 kg)	Jr	William S. Hart HS	Santa Clarita, CA
30	INF	Paul Toboni	R/R	6 ft 2 in (1.88 m)	185 lb (84 kg)	Jr	St. Ignatius HS	San Francisco, CA
51	INF	Jacob Wark	L/R	6 ft 3 in (1.91 m)	240 lb (109 kg)	So	Jesuit HS	Portland, OR
22	OF	Vince Bruno	L/R	5 ft 10 in (1.78 m)	170 lb (77 kg)	Jr	Los Medanos College	Concord, CA
45	OF	Chad Bunting	R/R	5 ft 11 in (1.8 m)	190 lb (86 kg)	Sr	Ukiah HS	Ukiah, CA
25	OF	Brian Celsi	/	5 ft 9 in (1.75 m)	170 lb (77 kg)	Fr	Jesuit HS	Elk Grove, CA
2	OF	Darrel Matthews	L/R	5 ft 9 in (1.75 m)	158 lb (72 kg)	Jr	Clayton Valley HS	Concord, CA
19	OF	Danny Oh	L/L	6 ft 0 in (1.83 m)	196 lb (89 kg)	Sr	Henry M. Jackson HS	Mill Creek, WA

Head coach

David Esquer

Assistant coach(es)

Tony Arnerich
Mike Neu
Brad Sanfilippo

Legend

- (C) Team captain
- (S) Suspended
- (I) Ineligible
- Injured
- Current redshirt

Roster
Last update: February 6, 2012
