= 2012 Nebraska Cornhuskers baseball team =

American college baseball season

2012 Nebraska Cornhuskers baseball
- Conference: Big Ten
- Record: 35–23 (14–10 Big Ten)
- Head coach: Darin Erstad (1st season)
- Hitting coach: Will Bolt (4th season)
- Pitching coach: Ted Silva (1st season)
- Home stadium: Hawks Field

2012 Big Ten Conference baseball standings
	Conf.				Overall
Team	W		L	PCT	W		L	PCT
No. 15 Purdue ‍†‍‡‍^{y}	17	–	7	.708	45	–	14	.763
Indiana ‍‍‍	16	–	8	.667	32	–	28	.533
Penn State ‍‍‍	15	–	9	.625	29	–	27	.518
Nebraska ‍‍‍	14	–	10	.583	35	–	23	.603
Michigan State ‍‍‍^{y}	13	–	11	.542	37	–	23	.617
Ohio State ‍‍‍	11	–	13	.458	33	–	27	.550
Illinois ‍‍‍	11	–	13	.458	28	–	25	.528
Minnesota ‍‍‍	11	–	13	.458	29	–	27	.518
Iowa ‍‍‍	10	–	14	.417	23	–	27	.460
Michigan ‍‍‍	8	–	16	.333	22	–	34	.393
Northwestern ‍‍‍	6	–	18	.250	18	–	36	.333
† – Conference champion ‡ – Tournament champion y – Invited to the NCAA tournament As of June 30, 2012; Rankings from Coaches' Poll

The 2012 Nebraska Cornhuskers baseball team was the first season of the program's new head coach Darin Erstad and featured a new coaching staff and a roster that included 12 new players. The Huskers entered their first season of Big Ten baseball after 15 seasons in the Big 12 Conference that included three regular-season titles and four tournament crowns.

== 2011 ==
In their last season in the Big 12 Conference, the Huskers went 30–25 overall and had a ninth-place 9–17 record in conference play, missing out in the Big 12 tournament for the third consecutive season. Cody Asche became a second-team all-American and a first-team all-conference player while Casey Hauptman won second-team all conference honors. They were both drafted in the 2011 Major League Baseball draft. At the conclusion of the season, Mike Anderson and the entire coaching staff were terminated on May 22, 2011, and the University of Nebraska hired former Husker and Major League All-Star Darin Erstad on June 2, 2011, as head coach after one season as a volunteer assistant coach. A few days later, Ted Silva was hired as well as former Cornhuskers Will Bolt and Jeff Christy.

== Preview ==
=== Key losses ===
- Cody Asche – Drafted in the fourth round by Philadelphia Phillies in 2011 MLB Draft
- Khiry cooper – Would be senior out with a foot injury
- Logan ehlers – Quit team in fall 2011 and transferred to Howard Junior College in Big Spring, Texas
- Matt freeman – Senior in 2011
- Casey hauptman – Senior in 2011, drafted in 26th round by N.Y. Mets
- Patric tolentino – Senior in 2011
- Sean yost – Would-be senior with injury

=== Preseason picks ===
The Big Ten coaches picked Nebraska to finish fourth out of the league's 11 teams in 2012. Three Husker juniors were also named to the ‘Players to Watch List’, including right-handed pitcher Travis Huber, right-handed pitcher Tom Lemke and first baseman-designated hitter Kash Kalkowski.

=== Schedule summary ===
The Huskers played 31 home games at Hawks Field and had 13 contests against 2011 NCAA Tournament teams, including a four-game home stand against 2011 College World Series qualifier California. The 56-game schedule started with 10 games on the road before the Huskers hosted their home opener against former Big 12 foe Kansas State on Tuesday, March 6. The Huskers played eight Big Ten Conference series, with three conference schools not on the schedule, including Penn State and Michigan State, as well as Wisconsin, which doesn't have a baseball program.

== Coaching staff ==
A 14-year MLB veteran and World Series champion, Erstad took over at his alma mater, where he was one of the most successful players in program history. Prior to becoming the No. 1 overall pick in the 1995 amateur draft, Erstad was a first-team All-American and the Big Eight Co-Player of the Year as a junior in 1995.

"It is a great honor to be the head coach of the Nebraska baseball program", Erstad said. "My family and I believe strongly in what the University stands for, and I am excited to have this opportunity to help influence kids’ lives in a positive way and help them turn into young men. I am committed to helping them grow as people."

2012 Nebraska Cornhuskers baseball coaching staff
Head coach	Darin Erstad
Associate Head coach	Will Bolt
Assistant coach	Ted Silva
Volunteer Assistant coach	Jeff Christy
Director of Operations	Curtis Ledbetter
Graduate Assistant	Brad Smith

Erstad is not the only former Husker on his coaching staff, as he brought on Will Bolt as his associate head coach and Jeff Christy as the team's volunteer assistant. A four-year starter and team captain on Nebraska's 2001 and 2002 College World Series teams, Bolt was a volunteer assistant on the Huskers’ 2005 squad that set a school record with 57 wins and produced the program's first win at the College World Series. Christy was a junior on the 2005 team and caught a school-record 64 games that season.

"It is an incredible opportunity to come back to a place where I had so many fond memories as a player and coach", Bolt said. "I am humbled and excited to work at my alma mater, and looking forward to making an impact in a coaching role and helping this program reach its goals. It is an honor to be included on a staff put together by a Husker legend and long-time big leaguer in Coach Erstad."

For his pitching coach, Erstad plucked Ted Silva away from California where he had coached at UC Irvine and Loyola Marymount over the previous four seasons. As a player, Silva was a first-team All-American at Cal State Fullerton and earned the win in the Titans’ 1995 national championship game against USC in the College World Series.

== Schedule ==
2012 Nebraska Cornhuskers baseball game log
Regular Season

Date	Location	NU rank	Opponent	Winning pitcher	Losing pitcher	Save by	Result	Record (Big Ten)
Feb. 17	Peoria, Arizona	NR	Gonzaga	Peterson, D. (1–0)	Vogt, D. (0–1)	Abbruzza, Z. (1)	4–7	0–1
Feb. 18	Peoria, Arizona	NR	Gonzaga	Bigelow, D. (1–0)	Niederklein (0–1)	Abbruzza, Z. (2)	8–10	0–2
Feb. 19	Peoria, Arizona	NR	Gonzaga	Pterson, D. (2–0)	Pierce, B. (0–1)		4–5	0–3
Feb. 24	Corpus Christi, Texas	NR	Utah	Hirsch, Z. (1–0)	Adams, Zach (0–2)	Huber, T. (1)	5–2	1–3
Feb. 25	Corpus Christi, Texas	NR	Utah	Keller, J. (1–0)	Mordini (0–2)		15–0	2–3
Feb. 25	Corpus Christi, Texas	NR	Texas A&M–Corpus Christi	Niederklein (1–1)	Keller, T. (0–1)		7–1	3–3
Feb. 26	Corpus Christi, Texas	NR	UNLV	Pierce, B. (1–1)	Shannon, M. (0–1)	Huber, T. (2)	8–7	4–3
March 2	Minneapolis, Minnesota	NR	West Virginia	Walter, C. (1–1)	Hirsch, Z. (1–1)	Dierdorff, D (1)	1–4	4–4
March 3	Minneapolis, Minnesota	NR	New Mexico State	Pierce, B. (2–1)	Coffman, S. (0–1)		6–4	5–4
March 4	Minneapolis, Minnesota	NR	Minnesota	Lemke, T. (1–0)	Lubinsky (0–2)		10–3	6–4
March 6	Hawks Field	RV	Kansas State	Vogt, D. (1–1)	Conlon, S. (1–1)	Huber, T. (3)	9–6	7–4
March 7	Hawks Field	RV	Nebraska–Kearney	Hander, R. (1–0)	Ridenour (1–3)	Bublitz, L. (1)	4–1	8–4
March 9	Hawks Field	RV	#21 California	Scott (3–0)	Huber, T. (0–1)		8–11 (11 inn.)	8–5
March 10	Hawks Field	RV	#21 California	Keller, J. (2–0)	Flemer (2–1)		12–5	9–5
March 11	Hawks Field	RV	#21 California	Porter (2–0)	Lemke, T. (1–1)		0–4	9–6
March 12	Hawks Field	NR	#18 California	Niederklein (2–1)	Theofanopoul (0–2)		9–5	10–6
March 13	Hawks Field	NR	South Dakota State	Bummer, A. (1–0)	Fiedelman (0–1)		12–3	11–6
March 15	Hawks Field	NR	Louisiana Tech	Hirsch, Z. (2–1)	Maton (3–1)	Pierce, B. (1)	9–2	12–6
March 16	Hawks Field	NR	Louisiana Tech	Keller, J. (3–0)	Petersen (1–2)		22–3	13–6
March 17	Hawks Field	NR	Louisiana Tech	Lemke, T. (2–1)	Gilley (1–2)		11–4	14–6
March 18	Hawks Field	NR	Louisiana Tech	Dudley (2–0)	Bublitz, L. (0–1)	Stefan (1)	5–6	14–7
March 20	Hawks Field	NR	Northern Colorado	Kubat, K. (1–0)	Willman, J. (1–3)		12–3	15–7
March 21	Hawks Field	NR	Northern Colorado	Hammer, C. (1–0)	Huber, T. (0–2)		7–11	15–8
March 23	Hawks Field	NR	Illinois	Johnson, K. (4–1)	Lemke, T. (2–2)		3–11	15–9 (0–1)
March 24	Hawks Field	NR	Illinois	Kubat, K. (2–0)	Kravetz, J. (3–1)		18–5	16–9 (1–1)
March 25	Hawks Field	NR	Illinois	Hirsch, Z. (3–1)	Ferry, J. (1–1)		13–3	17–9 (2–1)
March 27	Hawks Field		Kansas State	Pierce, B. (3–1)	Wivinis, M. (1–1)	Huber, T. (4)	6–3	18–9 (2–1)
March 30	Evanston, Illinois		Northwestern	Lemke, T. (3–2)	Brooke, F. (1–2)	Huber, T. (5)	7–4	19–9 (3–1)
March 31	Evanston, Illinois		Northwestern	Magallones (5–0)	Keller, J. (3–1)		4–8	19–10 (3–2)
April 1	Evanston, Illinois		Northwestern	Morton (1–5)	Hirsch, Z. (3–2)		1–6	19–11 (3–3)
April 3	Manhattan, Kansas		Kansas State	King, T. (1–0)	Moore, J (2–2)		6–0	20–11 (3–3)
April 6	Hawks Field		Iowa	Hippen (3–3)	Lemke, T. (3–3)	Brown (5)	3–4	20–12 (3–4)
April 7	Hawks Field		Iowa	Pierce, B. (4–1)	Dermody (1–4)	Niederklein (1)	9–4	21–12 (4–4)
April 8	Hawks Field		Iowa	Huber, T. (1–2)	Brown (1–1)		9–8	22–12 (5–4)
April 10	Hawks Field		Creighton	Keller, J. (4–1)	Musec (3–2)		5–3	23–12 (5–4)
April 13	Columbus, Ohio		Ohio State	Long (3–1)	King, T. (1–1)		2–10	23–13 (5–5)
April 14	Columbus, Ohio		Ohio State	Vogt, D. (2–1)	McKinney (4–4)	Huber, T. (6)	5–4	24–13 (6–5)
April 15	Columbus, Ohio		Ohio State	Hirsch, Z. (4–2)	Kuchno (5–2)		17–9	25–13 (7–5)
April 20	Hawks Field		Purdue	Mascarello (7–1)	Niederklein (2–2)		5–8	25–14 (7–6)
April 21	Hawks Field		Purdue	Pierce, B. (5–1)	Breedlove (6–3)		8–3	26–14 (8–6)
April 22	Hawks Field		Purdue	Podkul (2–0)	Hirsch, Z. (4–3)	Wittgren (8)	3–8	26–15 (8–7)
April 24	TD Ameritrade Park		Creighton	Hander, R. (2–0)	Musec (3–3)	Huber, T. (7)	4–1	27–15 (8–7)
April 27	Hawks Field		Cal State Bakersfield	Bublitz, L. (1–1)	Carter (1–2)		3–2 (11 inn.)	28–15 (8–7)
April 28	Hawks Field		Cal State Bakersfield	McKenzie (4–4)	Pierce, B. (5–2)		2–10	28–16 (8–7)
April 29	Hawks Field		Cal State Bakersfield	Cancelled (Rain)				
May 5	Bloomington, Indiana		Indiana	Kubat, K. (3–0)	DeNato (7–2)		13–2	29–16 (9–7)
May 6	Bloomington, Indiana		Indiana	Hart (4–4)	Pierce, B. (5–3)	Hoffman (4)	5–7	29–17 (9–8)
May 7	Bloomington, Indiana		Indiana	Martin (1–3)	Hirsch, Z. (4–4)	Hoffman (5)	6–9	29–18 (9–9)
May 8	TD Ameritrade Park		Creighton	Blach (4–5)	Lemke, T. (3–4)		1–8	29–19 (9–9)
May 11	Hawks Field		Minnesota	Kubat, K. (4–0)	Oakes (7–3)	Vogt, D. (1)	4–3	30–19 (10–9)
May 12	Hawks Field		Minnesota	King, T. (2–1)	Snelten (4–4)	Pierce, B. (2)	8–7	31–19 (11–9)
May 13	Hawks Field		Minnesota	Bublitz, L. (2–1)	Lubinsky (3–4)	Vogt, D. (2)	6–5	32–19 (12–9)
May 15	Hawks Field		Wichita State	Mateychick (4–1)	Hirsch, Z. (4–5)		2–13	32–20 (12–9)
May 17	Ann Arbor, Michigan		Michigan	Kubat, K. (5–0)	Ogden (3–4)		15–2	33–20 (13–9)
May 18	Ann Arbor, Michigan		Michigan	Sinnery (5–5)	Pierce, B. (5–4)		5–6	33–21 (13–10)
May 19	Ann Arbor, Michigan		Michigan	Lemke, T. (4–4)	Brosnahan (3–4)		7–3	34–21 (14–10)

Postseason
Big Ten Tournament

Date	Location	NU rank	Opponent	Winning pitcher	Losing pitcher	Save by	Result	Record (Big Ten)
May 23	Columbus, Ohio		Michigan State	Bucciferro (6–3)	Kubat, K. (5–1)	Wieber, T (9)	9–10	34–22 (14–10)
May 24	Columbus, Ohio		Penn State	Hander, R. (3–0)	Hill (5–4)		12–3	35–22 (14–10)
May 25	Columbus, Ohio		Ohio State	King (5–5)	Spitsnogle (0–1)		2–6	36–23 (14–10)

== Season summary ==
The Nebraska baseball team met the Gonzaga Bulldogs for the first time on February 17 and dropped its opening game of the 2012 season by a score of 7–4. Playing the first game of a three-game series at the Peoria Sports Complex (the Spring training home of the Seattle Mariners and San Diego Padres in Peoria, Arizona), the Huskers took a 4–3 lead into the seventh inning. Nebraska was unable to hold on though, as a three-run eighth inning from the Zags doomed the Huskers. The first victory of the season fell through their hands on in game 2 as Gonzaga rallied for a 10–8 victory to take game two of the three-game series. The Huskers took an 8–5 lead into the top of the ninth, but the Bulldog bats came alive with five runs to steal the win after committing seven errors in the game. The ninth inning was again unkind to Nebraska in the finale as the Bulldogs erased a 4–2 deficit with three runs in the top of the ninth to steal victory for the second straight game.

The next weekend the Huskers traveled to Corpus Christi, Texas, to play in the Kleberg Bank College Classic at Whataburger Field. In game 1, Zach Hirsch picked up his first win as a husker and Head Coach Darin Erstad earned his first win as the Huskers' head coach in a 5–2 win over the Utah Utes. The next day, Nebraska beat Utah again and Texas A&M Chorpus Christi with a combined score of 22–1. The Huskers finished the tournament with a perfect 4–0 record as they came from behind to beat UNLV in the first ever meeting between the 2 teams. The offense scored 35 runs on 54 hits over the three days and 8 Huskers joined the all tournament team – Cory Burleson, Josh Scheffert, Bryan Peters, Kurt Farmer, Chad Christensen (MVP), Rich Sanguinetti, Richard Stock, and Jon Keller.

On March 2, Nebraska went north to play in the Dairy Queen Classic, one of the longest running tournaments in the nation, in Minnesota played at the Metrodome. It was the fifth time they have competed in the event. The Huskers dropped their opening game of the Dairy Queen Classic by a score of 4–1. The Huskers totaled six hits on the day and worked seven walks off the WVU pitching staff, but were doomed by the 10 runners they left on base. New Mexico State was the next team to face as Nebraska entered the ninth down 4–2 when the bats came alive and Rich Sanguinetti ended the game with a two-run walk-off home run with 2 outs capping a dramatic ninth inning for the Huskers with for a 6–4 win over the Aggies. The Huskers won their last game defeating conference foe, Minnesota 10–3 in a non conference game. On offense, after scoring only seven runs through the first two games, the Husker offense exploded for seven runs in the first four frames against the Gophers. Three Huskers earned all-tournament honors, including Richard Stock at first base, Austin Darby in the outfield and Michael Pritchard at designated hitter. Pritchard also earned the tournament's Silver Stick Award as the weekend's most valuable hitter.

After a 6–4 road stint, the huskers headed home for a 17-game homestand starting with Kansas state. A pair of four-run innings carried Nebraska to a 9–6 win over the Kansas State Wildcats at Hawks Field in front of 4,169 fans. It is their 34th straight home opener win dating back to 1979 and moved to 11–0 in home openers at Hawks Field. The next day, Kale Kiser hit a home run for the second straight day and junior Ryan Hander picked his first win of the year as the team moved to 8–4 with a 4–1 win over Division II Nebraska-Kearney.

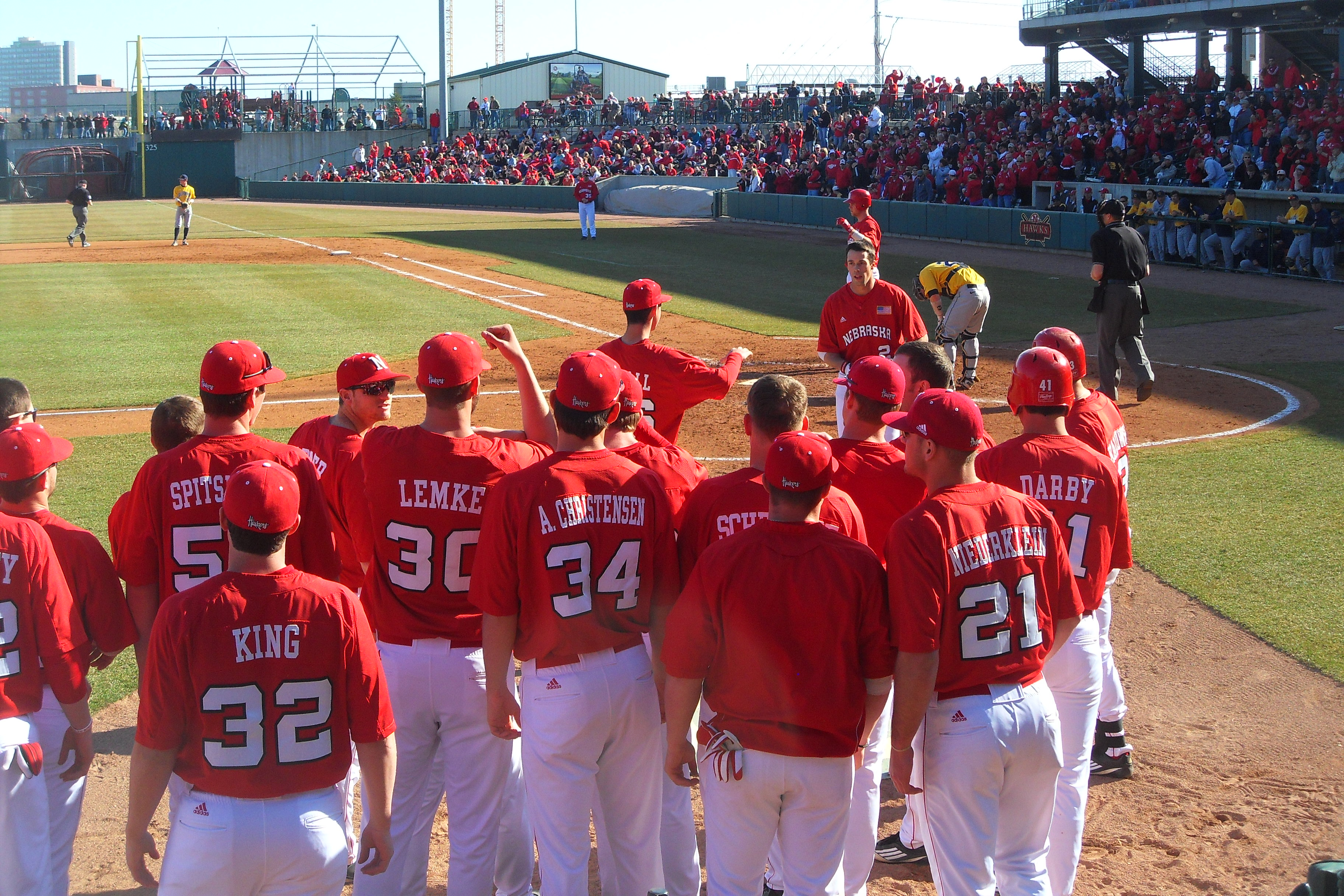
The Huskers celebrating a home run by Chad Christensen against the California Golden Bears

That weekend, 2011 College World Series qualifier California Bears came to town for a four-game series. In game one, the Huskers found themselves in a hole, falling behind 0–7, but a pair of runs in both the eighth and ninth innings capped an 8–8 comeback, extending the game into extra innings, but the Huskers were unable to pull out a win after the Bears plated three runs in the top of the 11th inning to win 11–8. In game 2, Nebraska had an offensive show in front of 5,298 fans with a 12–5 win over the Bears blasting three home runs on the day, including a grand slam by Rich Sanguinetti. The Bears responded and Nebraska was unable to find a rhythm in game 3 in a 4–0 loss with only 3 hits on the game but rebounded in the series finale breaking through with eight runs in the bottom of the fifth inning evening the series with a 9–5 victory for a 2–2 series split.

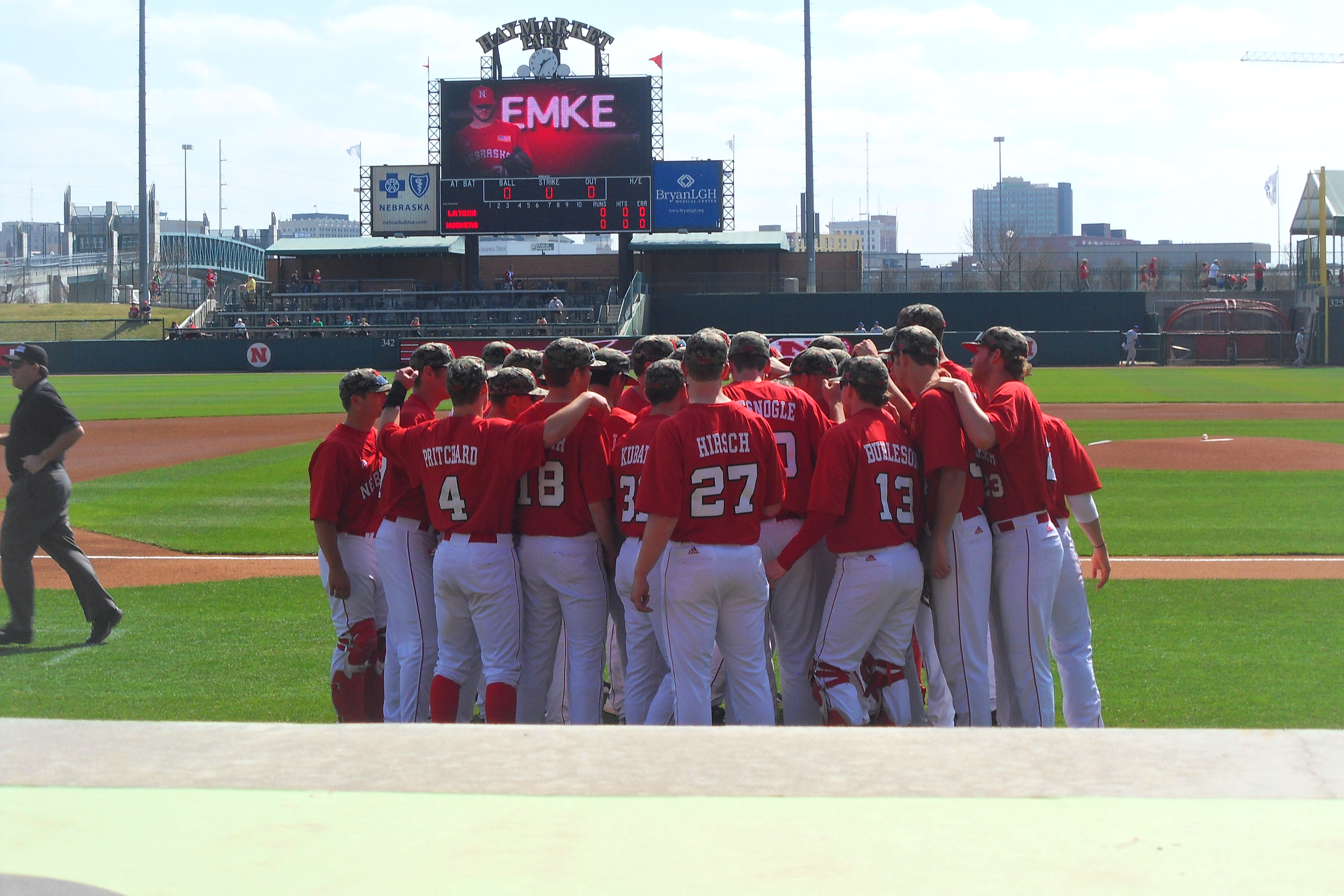
Nebraska wearing camo hats against Louisiana Tech

The Huskers played for the 5th day in a row and 1st of 5 games in week 5 against South Dakota State by a score of 12–3 hammering out 15 hits before Louisiana tech came for a 4-game series. Nebraska won game 1 9–2 as Cory Burleson hit an inside-the-park home run, the first one by a Husker since Jake Mullinax hit one against West Virginia at the 2004 Dairy Queen Classic at the Metrodome in Minneapolis, Minn. The next day there was plenty of offense against the Bulldogs with 24 hits in a 22–3 win which is the most runs in over eight years, as they also scored 22 in a win over Kent State at the Ultimate Dugout Baseball Fiesta in Albuquerque, N.M, on Feb. 22, 2004. Behind a career-high five hits from Josh Scheffert, the Nebraska baseball team posted its fifth straight win with an 11–4 victory over the Louisiana. The Huskers pounded out 17 hits on the afternoon and scored 42 runs on 52 hits through the first three games of the series but the Bulldogs responded with a 6–5 victory to avoid a sweep.

The Huskers hosted Northern Colorado in a 2-game midweek series before conference games begin. On March 20, a seven-run fourth inning powered Nebraska to a 12–3 win in game one but was unable to overcome a four-run eighth inning by the Bears resulting in a 6–4 loss splitting the series a game a piece.

Conference play opened on March 23 against Illinois and fell behind early but were unable to battle back in an 11–3 loss. Nebraska rebounded in game 2 with an 18–5 win over the Fighting Illini to tie the series. Trailing 3–0 going into the bottom of the second, NU plated 11 runs on seven hits, as the first nine batters of the inning reached base and scored. All but one of the Huskers' starters had at least one hit on the day. The rubber match went to the Huskers as they put together one of its best games of the season with a 13–3 win over the Illinois to win in the first ever Big Ten series. The Huskers outscored Illinois by a combined score of 31–8 in the final two games of the series to open conference play with a series win for the first time since 2008 when they swept Kansas State in Manhattan. Husker fans topped the 5,000 mark in all three games, with a combined 15,697 fans coming out to see the Huskers open conference play.

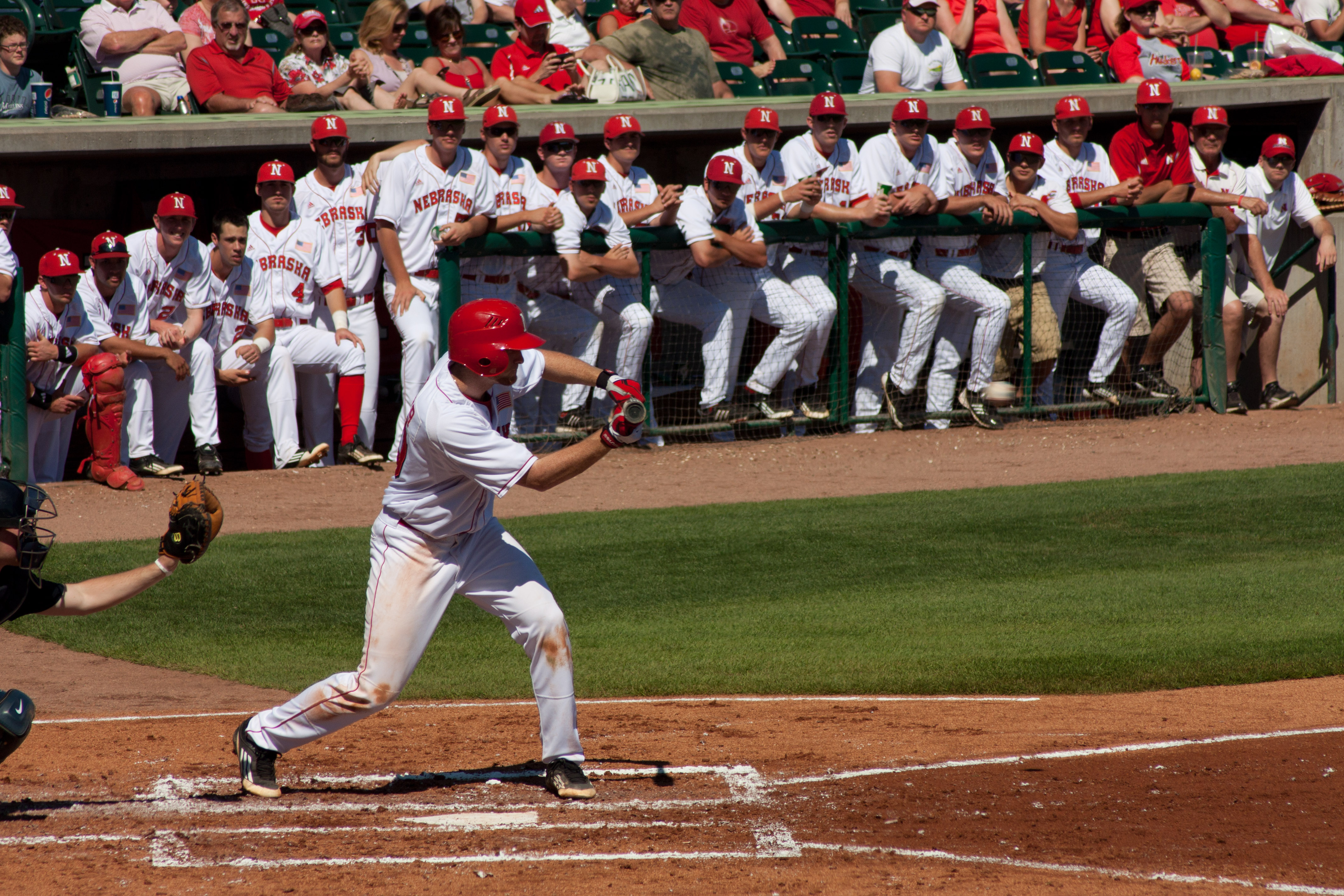
A Cornhuskers player squares up to bunt during a March 24 game against Illinois

The team wrapped up its 17-game home stand with a 6–3 win over the Kansas State Wildcats in a mid week game. The Huskers started and ended the home stand with wins over the Wildcats. Now 18–9 on the season and 2–1 in Big Ten play, the Huskers went 12–5 on the home stand.

Nebraska headed to Northwestern for their first road conference series on March 30. They opened the series with a 7–4 win over the Wildcats but a season-high six errors from the Husker defense combined with 12 strikeouts from the NU offense resulted in an 8–4 loss in game 2 while none of the Wildcats' eight runs were earned off the Husker pitching staff. It is the Huskers' first loss this season when out-hitting their opponent as the Huskers out-hit the Wildcats, 7–6. A complete game from Northwestern's Zach Morton was too much for the Huskers with only six hits in game 3 dropping the series in a 6–1 loss.

Nebraska looked to sweep the season series with KSU as they traveled to Manhattan, Kan. They picked up their 20th win of the season to sweep the Kansas State Wildcats with a 6–0 win as five pitchers combined for the four-hit shutout.

The Huskers returned home to host the 12–14 Iowa Hawkeyes in their 3rd conference series. A four-run fifth inning propelled the Iowa Hawkeyes to a 4–3 series-opening win over the Nebraska. The Huskers took a 2–0 lead into the fifth and cut Iowa's lead to one with a run in the bottom of the fifth, but were unable to plate a run over the final four innings to tie the game. The Huskers evened the series in game 2 with a strong outing from Brandon Pierce in his first career conference start to help the Huskers post a 9–4 win. A game-tying two-RBI triple from Pat Kelly followed by a walk-off single from Kale Kiser completed a dramatic ninth-inning comeback by the Huskers, as the Huskers rallied for a 9–8 win to take the series.

The Huskers hosted Creighton in the first of three meetings on April 10. A career-high 8 innings from sophomore Jon Keller carried Nebraska in a 5–3 victory over the Bluejays. Keller improved to 4–1 on the year, as he gave up just two runs (one earned) on three hits, while striking out six.

Nebraska traveled to Columbus, Ohio to play the 20–12 Ohio State who is tied with Nebraska at second place in the Big Ten. A rough first inning put Nebraska in a 7–0 hole that they were never able to climb out of in game 1 at Bill Davis Stadium as the Buckeyes went on to win the game 10–2. Game 2 got postponed due to rain and played a double header on Sunday. Home runs from Kale Kiser, Kash Kalkowski, and Josh Scheffert accounted for all five of Nebraska's runs a 5–4 win over the Ohio State Buckeyes to end their 7-game win streak. Nebraska swept a doubleheader with a 17–9 score to win its first conference road series since taking 2-of-3 from Baylor in Waco, Texas, during the 2008 season.

Without a midweek game, Nebraska welcomed the #16 Purdue Boilermakers who entered the series with a 9-game win streak. After falling behind 4–0 to start game 1, Nebraska evened the score at 5–5 in the bottom of the fourth, but Cameron Perkins' second home run of the game in the top of the fifth proved to be the eventual winner in an 8–5 game. For the 4th conference series, the Huskers rebounded after falling in the opener. In front of a season-high crowd of 6,257 fans at Hawks Field on Saturday afternoon, the Huskers evened its series with Purdue with an 8–3 win. The Huskers dropped the series finale by a score of 8–3 in front of another 6,000+ fans at Hawks Field.

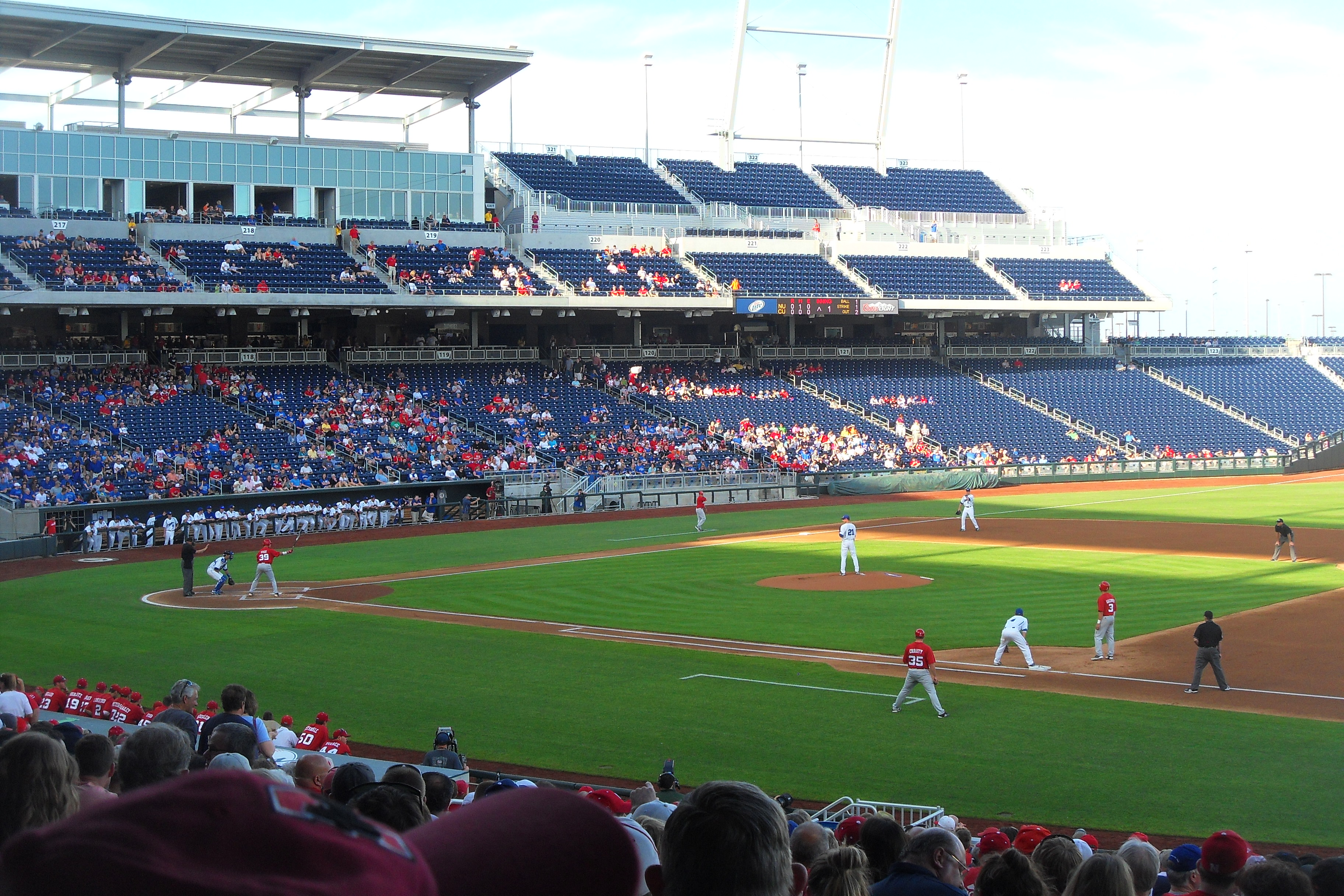
Nebraska vs Creighton on April 24th at TD Ameritrade Park

The baseball team headed 50 miles to TD Ameritrade Park in Omaha, Nebraska to play their second game of the series. Behind a pair of hits from four different Huskers and a three-hit game from the Nebraska pitching staff, Nebraska earned its second win of the season over the Creighton Bluejays with a 4–1 win.

Nebraska hosted its final non-conference series of the season when the CSU Bakersfield Roadrunners visited Hawks Field. Senior Kale Kiser came through with his second walk-off hit of the season in the bottom of the 11th inning of game 1 to propel the Huskers to a 3–2 win over the Roadrunners. The Roadrunners then tied the series with a 10–2 win in front of 5,111 fans in game 2. The rubber match was cancelled due to rain which kept the series tied giving Nebraska a record of 28–16 after the weekend.

The Huskers went on the road the next weekend to play the Indiana Hoosiers, who entered the series as one of the hottest teams in the conference in second place in the Big Ten. Behind a seven-strikeout performance from freshman Kyle Kubat and three home runs from the Husker offense, Nebraska put an end to the Indiana Hoosiers' four-game winning streak with a 13–2 win but couldn't take the series the next day as walks and miscues cost the Huskers in a 7–5 game. Nebraska failed to win the series as Indians bats were tough on NU's pitching with 16 hits in a 9–6 game.

The Huskers looked to sweep Creighton for the first time since 2008 in their last meeting of the year on May 8 but were unable to finish the sweet as the Jays used 16 hits to produce an 8–1 win.

The Huskers headed back home to hose their last conference series against Minnesota. A two-run home run from freshman Pat Kelly and a six innings of solid work on the mound from freshman Kyle Kubat led Nebraska to their 30th win of the season with a 4–3 victory over the Minnesota Golden Gophers. Sophomore Michael Pritchard went 0–4 ending his hitting streak at 25 games which ties Derek Dukart (1994) for the third longest hitting streak at NU since 1958. Freshman Pat Kelly's 7th home run of the season propelled Nebraska to victory for the second straight game the Golden Gophers, as the Huskers held on to an 8–7 victory. His seven home runs this season are the most by a NU freshman since Alex Gordon hit seven in 2003. Behind three solo home runs, Nebraska secured the Huskers' first sweep of a conference foe since NU swept Texas Tech at Hawks Field to end the 2010 season and put an exclamation point on Senior Day. The Huskers won each game by one run and put themselves into fourth place in the Big Ten standings.

Wichita State came to Lincoln for the Huskers last home game of the season as the Shockers spoiled Nebraska with a 19-hit performance coasting to a 13–2 win.

Nebraska went on the road for their last regular season games against the Michigan Wolverines. The Huskers punched their ticket to the Big Ten Tournament with a 15–2 win over Michiganas they strung together a conference-high 20 hits. They were then held to just five runs in a 6–5 loss to the Wolverines in game 2. They secured the No. 4 seed at the Big Ten Tournament with a 7–3 win over the Michigan ending the season with a 14–10 conference record.

The Huskers opened the post season against Michigan State. They nearly completed one of the biggest comebacks in program history but a leaping catch by Michigan State second baseman Ryan Jones on a line drive off the bat of Pat Kelly secured a 10–9 win for the Spartans at Huntington Park. The Huskers entered the bottom of the ninth inning down 10–2, but five two-out runs had the Huskers in position to tie the game. They got sent to the losers bracket and played Penn State in game 2 and the Huskers responded with 12–3 victory racking up 18 hits as Stock extended his hitting streak to 20 games. Along with Michael Prichard's 25-game hitting streak earlier this season, it marks the first time in school history that a pair of teammates have each produced hitting streaks of 20 game or more in the same season. Nebraska was then set up to play Ohio State in an elimination game. The Buckeyes ended the Huskers season with a 6–2 win. The Huskers out hit the Buckeyes, 9–8, but NU stranded 10 runners on the afternoon and committed three errors in the field.

== Statistics ==
Hitting

Player	G	BA	AB	H	2B	3B	HR	TB	SLG	R	RBI	BB	SO	SB
Michael Pritchard	57	.387	212	82	10	0	0	92	.434	51	22	21	10	6
Josh Scheffert	50	.358	179	64	12	0	8	100	.559	37	41	15	24	5
Richard Stock	52	.351	211	74	20	3	4	112	.531	40	45	8	18	1
Austin Darby	42	.324	139	45	9	0	2	60	.432	24	15	16	25	7
Rich Sanguinetti	55	.323	217	70	11	2	2	91	.419	44	43	16	35	7
Pat Kelly	45	.313	163	51	6	2	8	85	.521	27	37	6	24	5
Chad Christensen	57	.311	228	71	9	2	10	114	.500	49	48	19	36	8
Kash Kalkowski	48	.310	174	54	8	0	4	74	.425	25	37	4	17	7
Blake Headley	25	.304	46	14	0	0	0	14	.304	6	6	6	10	1
Cory Burleson	44	.273	132	36	7	0	1	46	.348	25	22	9	32	3
Kale Kiser	54	.259	158	41	7	1	6	68	.430	37	37	38	17	6
Kurt Farmer	25	.250	68	17	1	1	2	26	.382	15	10	11	10	2
Bryan Peters	30	.241	79	19	3	1	0	24	.304	18	11	7	10	2
Ty Kildow	23	.182	22	4	0	0	0	4	.182	8	0	4	8	2
Sam Stucky	13	.172	29	5	1	0	0	6	.207	7	1	4	12	0
Total	58	.315	2057	647	104	12	47	916	.445	413	375	184	288	62

Pitching

Player	App	GS	W	L	SV	ERA	CG	ShO	IP	H	R	ER	BB	SO
Dylan Vogt	25	0	2	1	2	1.84	0	0	53.2	46	15	11	14	34
Kyle Kubat	15	8	5	1	0	2.63	0	0	51.1	56	18	15	19	31
Ryan Hander	16	4	3	0	0	2.97	0	0	33.1	29	11	11	10	25
Aaron Bummer	20	0	1	0	0	3.26	0	0	19.1	16	8	7	10	22
Travis Huber	20	0	1	2	7	3.32	0	0	21.2	25	11	8	10	17
Brandon Pierce	23	6	5	4	2	4.21	0	0	57.2	55	34	27	37	35
Tom Lemke	14	8	4	4	0	4.57	0	0	45.1	64	26	23	10	20
Dexter Spitsnogle	8	5	0	1	0	4.87	0	0	20.1	22	12	11	6	14
Jon Keller	13	10	4	1	0	5.37	0	0	52.0	66	41	31	25	33
Tyler King	27	2	2	1	0	5.40	0	0	28.1	27	26	17	18	21
Zach Hirsch	14	13	4	5	0	5.52	0	0	60.1	80	39	37	14	32
Luke Bublitz	21	0	2	1	1	6.15	0	0	26.1	37	19	18	7	19
Tyler Niederklein	19	2	2	2	1	7.11	0	0	38.0	48	30	30	14	19
Jeff Stovall	10	0	0	0	0	8.68	0	0	9.1	20	10	9	5	6
Total	58	58	35	23	13	4.40	0	2	517.0	591	300	253	199	328

== Honors and awards ==
Chad Christensen

- All-Big Ten First Team

Austin Darby

- All-Big Ten Freshman Team

Pat Kelly

- All-Big Ten Third Team
- All-Big Ten Freshman Team
- Collegiate Baseball Freshman All-American
- NCBWA First-Team Freshman All-American
- Baseball America First-Team Freshman All-American
- Perfect Game Second-Team Freshman All-American

Kyle Kubat

- All-Big Ten Third Team
- All-Big Ten Freshman Team
- Collegiate Baseball Freshman All-American

Michael Pritchard

- All-Big Ten First Team
- All-Midwest Second Team
- NCBWA Third-Team All-American

Rich Sanguinetti

- All-Big Ten First Team

Josh Scheffert

- All-Big Ten Second Team

Richard Stock

- All-Big Ten Third Team

== Rankings ==
Ranking movements Legend: ██ Increase in ranking ██ Decrease in ranking — = Not ranked RV = Received votes
	Week																			
Poll	Pre	1	2	3	4	5	6	7	8	9	10	11	12	13	14	15	16	17	18	Final
Coaches'	—	—*	RV	—	—	—	—	—	—	—	—	—	—	—	—	—	—	—	—	—
Baseball America	—	—	—	—	—	—	—	—	—	—	—	—	—	—	—	—	—	—	—	—
Collegiate Baseball^	RV	—	—	—	—	—	—	—	—	—	—	—	—	—	—	—	—	—	—	—
NCBWA†	RV	—	—	—	—	—	—	—	—	—	—	—	—	—	—	—	—	—	—	—

^ Collegiate Baseball ranked 40 teams in their preseason poll, but only ranked 30 teams weekly during the season.
† NCBWA ranks 30 teams in their preseason poll, but only ranks 25 teams weekly during the season.
* A new poll was not released for this week, so for comparison purposes, the previous week's ranking is inserted in this week's slot.

== Cornhuskers in the 2012 MLB draft ==
Player	Position	Round	Overall	MLB organization
Travis Huber		23	700	Minnesota Twins
Kale Kiser		23	711	Chicago White Sox
Richard Stock		23rd	713	Cleveland Indians
Khiry Cooper		25	781	Boston Red Sox
Chad Christensen		35	1067	Miami Marlins
