= Kevin Plawecki =

American baseball player (born 1991)

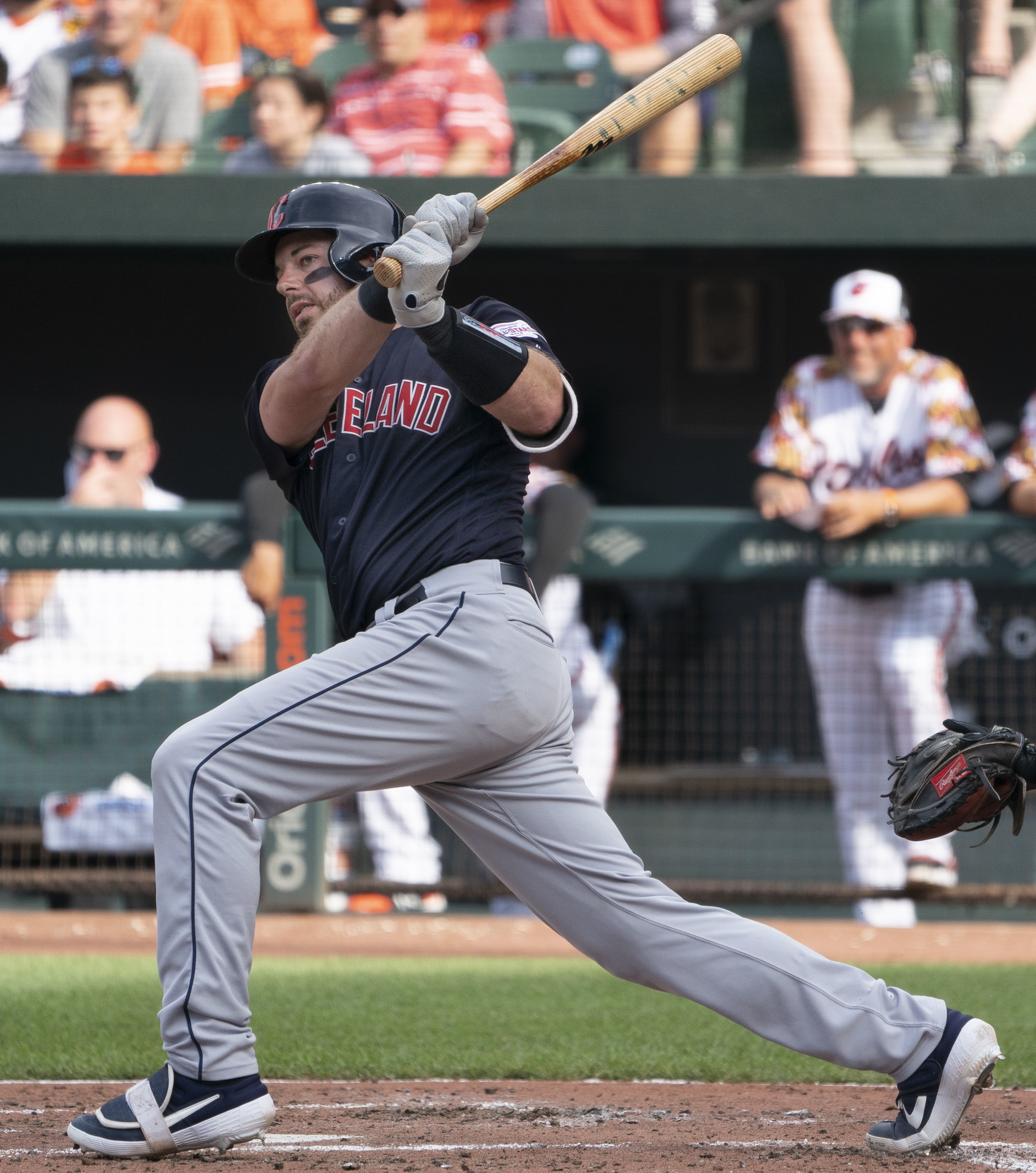
- Plawecki with the Cleveland Indians in 2019

San Diego Padres – No. 82
- Catcher / Coach
- Born: February 26, 1991 (age 35); Hinsdale, Illinois, U.S.
- Batted: Right Threw: Right

MLB debut
- April 21, 2015, for the New York Mets

Last MLB appearance
- October 4, 2022, for the Texas Rangers

MLB statistics
- Batting average: .235
- Home runs: 22
- Runs batted in: 137
- Stats at Baseball Reference

Teams
- As player: New York Mets (2015–2018); Cleveland Indians (2019); Boston Red Sox (2020–2022); Texas Rangers (2022); As coach: San Diego Padres (2026–present)

Kevin Jeffrey Plawecki (/pləˈwɛki/; born February 26, 1991) is an American former professional baseball catcher who currently serves as the catching coach for the San Diego Padres of Major League Baseball (MLB). He played in MLB for the New York Mets, Cleveland Indians, Boston Red Sox, and Texas Rangers.

Plawecki starred in baseball for Westfield High School in Indiana. He then attended Purdue University, where he played college baseball for the Boilermakers, was named an All-American in 2012, and won the Big Ten Conference Baseball Player of the Year in 2012. The Mets selected him with the 35th overall pick in the 2012 MLB draft.

== Amateur career ==
Plawecki was born in Hinsdale, Illinois, on February 26, 1991, to Jeff and Lynne Plawecki. He attended Westfield High School in Westfield, Indiana, where he played for the school's baseball team. He was named an All-State Class 4A honorable mention at catcher in his senior year. He was not selected in the MLB draft following his senior year of high school. He enrolled at Purdue University, to play college baseball for the Purdue Boilermakers baseball team.

As a freshman at Purdue University in 2010, Plawecki had a .343 batting average, a .384 on-base percentage (OBP), and a .529 SLG, with eight home runs. He was named a freshman All-American by Louisville Slugger and the Big Ten Conference (Big Ten) All-Freshman of the Team. Following his freshman season at Purdue, Plawecki played collegiate summer baseball for the Richmond RiverRats of the Prospect League, where he batted 65-for-211 (.308) with fifteen doubles and 27 RBIs.

As a sophomore in 2011, Plawecki batted .341 with a .436 SLG, 2 home runs, and 39 RBIs. He was named first team All-Big Ten. That summer, Plawecki played for the Hyannis Harbor Hawks of the Cape Cod Baseball League and was named a league all-star.

In the 2012 season as a junior, Plawecki hit .359 batting average, a .445 on-base percentage (OBP), and a .578 SLG, with seven home runs. Plawecki was named the Most Outstanding Player of the 2012 Big Ten Conference baseball tournament and 2012 Big Ten Conference Baseball Player of the Year. He was a semifinalist for the Johnny Bench Award in 2011 and one of its three finalists in 2012.

== Professional career ==
=== New York Mets ===
The New York Mets selected Plawecki in the first round, with the 35th overall selection, in the 2012 Major League Baseball draft. In 2013, he played for the Savannah Sand Gnats of the Single-A South Atlantic League. He was promoted to the St. Lucie Mets of the High-A Florida State League, theto the Binghamton Mets of the Double-A Eastern League for the Eastern League playoffs.

In 2014, the Mets invited Plawecki to spring training. He started the season with the Binghamton Mets, where he hit .326 with six home runs and 43 RBIs in 224 at-bats. Plawecki was selected to play for the U.S. team in the 2014 All-Star Futures Game, along with Noah Syndergaard. After batting .326 for Binghamton, the Mets promoted Plawecki to the Las Vegas 51s of the Triple-A Pacific Coast League on June 24.

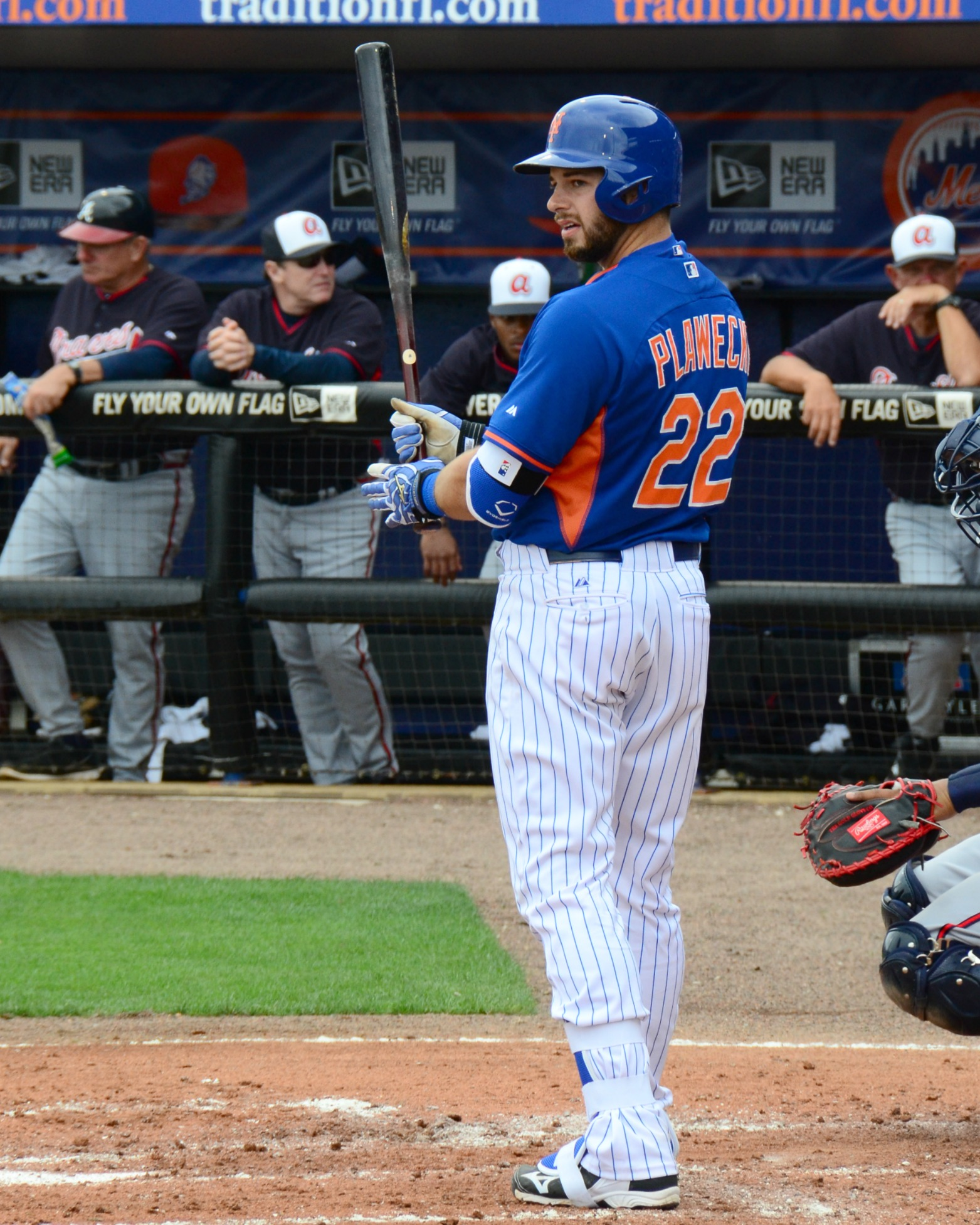
Plawecki with the Mets in spring training in 2015

The Mets invited Plawecki to spring training in 2015, and reassigned him to minor league camp so that he could start the season with Las Vegas. After Travis d'Arnaud went on the disabled list with a broken hand on April 19, the Mets announced they would promote Plawecki to the major leagues.

Plawecki made his major league debut on April 21, 2015, against the Atlanta Braves. He got his first career hit off Trevor Cahill and finished the game 2-for-4, with two runs scored. During a game against the New York Yankees on April 25, Plawecki hit his first career home run off CC Sabathia en route to an 8–2 victory. Plawecki became the first player to hit his first career home run in a Mets-Yankees Subway Series game.

Plawecki began experiencing dizziness in June, which sidelined him from playing for several games. He was demoted to the Las Vegas 51s on August 11 and recalled on September 1 due to expanded rosters in September. Plawecki finished the season with a .219 batting average with three home runs and 21 RBIs in 73 games played.

Plawecki had surgery on his paranasal sinuses during the 2015–16 offseason to address his dizziness. He batted .197 in 48 games for the Mets in 2016, spending the rest of the season with Las Vegas.

In an April 30, 2017, game against the Washington Nationals at Nationals Park, Plawecki was brought in to pitch for the first time since he was 14 years old. He threw only fastballs, giving up four runs over two innings. One of those was Anthony Rendon's third home run of the game. The Mets lost 23–5.

Plawecki suffered a broken hand on April 11, 2018.

=== Cleveland Indians ===
On January 6, 2019, the Mets traded Plawecki to the Cleveland Indians in exchange for Walker Lockett and Sam Haggerty. With the 2019 Indians, Plawecki appeared in 59 games, batting .222 with three home runs and 17 RBIs. He also made two pitching appearances, working a total of two innings without allowing a hit, walk, or run. On December 2, Plawecki was non-tendered and became a free agent.

=== Boston Red Sox ===
On January 3, 2020, the Red Sox signed Plawecki to a one-year, $900,000 contract. With the 2020 Red Sox, Plawecki batted .342 with one home run and 17 RBIs in 23 games. In early December, Plawecki and the Red Sox reached a one-year deal for the 2021 season. On February 17, 2021, he was placed on the COVID-19 injured list. He made the team's 2021 Opening Day roster to backup Christian Vázquez. Plawecki was placed on the injured list with a left hamstring strain on June 22, and returned to the team on July 9. Plawecki made 64 regular-season appearances for Boston, batting .287 with three home runs and 15 RBIs. He also played in five postseason games, batting 1-for-7, as the Red Sox advanced to the American League Championship Series.

On December 1, 2021, Plawecki and the Red Sox agreed to terms on a one-year contract for 2022, reportedly worth $2.25 million. He began the season again serving as backup to Vázquez. Plawecki missed a week of action in late April, spending time on the COVID-related list. He was again on the COVID-related list for two days during the first half of July. On September 17, Plawecki was designated for assignment, as the team added pitcher Frank German to the roster, and was released two days later. Plawecki appeared in 73 games while batting .217 with one home run and 12 RBIs for the 2022 Red Sox.

=== Texas Rangers ===
On September 21, 2022, Plawecki signed a major-league contract with the Texas Rangers. In three games with Texas late in the 2022 season, he batted .273 (3-for-11) with one RBI.

=== Minor leagues (2023–2024) ===
On February 12, 2023, Plawecki signed a minor league contract with the Pittsburgh Pirates organization. He failed to make the Pirates’ Opening Day roster in spring training and was released by the team on March 27.

On April 1, Plawecki signed a minor league contract with the Washington Nationals. Playing in 24 games for the Triple-A Rochester Red Wings, he hit .256/.351/.342 with 1 home run and 6 RBI. On May 16, Plawecki exercised the opt-out clause in his contract and became a free agent.

On May 20, Plawecki signed a minor league contract with the San Diego Padres. In 33 games for the Triple-A El Paso Chihuahuas, he hit .276/.333/.439 with 3 home runs and 21 RBI.

On July 28, Plawecki was traded to the Texas Rangers for cash. In 10 games for the Triple-A Round Rock Express, he hit .294/.400/.324 with 2 RBI. On August 15, the Rangers released Plawecki.

On December 30, Plawecki signed a minor league contract with the Padres. In 75 games for the Triple-A El Paso Chihuahuas in 2024, he slashed .260/.340/.443 with 11 home runs and 38 RBI. He elected free agency following the season on November 4.

On January 18, 2025, Plawecki announced his retirement from playing professional baseball.

== Coaching career ==
On January 18, 2025, Plawecki joined the San Diego Padres as an instructor for their rookie-level affiliate, the Arizona Complex League Padres. On December 9, the Padres promoted Plawecki to serve as the team's catching coach under new manager Craig Stammen.

== Personal life ==
Plawecki grew up in Westfield, Indiana, with his parents and younger brother. His father coached his youth baseball teams.

Plawecki and his wife married in November 2015. They have two sons. Plawecki is a Christian.
