= Westfield High School (Westfield, Indiana) =

Location
- 18250 North Union Street; Westfield, Indiana; United States; 40°03′06″N 86°07′48″W

Information
- Type: Public
- Established: 1904
- School district: Westfield-Washington Schools
- Principal: Alicia Denniston
- Teaching staff: 170.00 (FTE)
- Grades: 9-12
- Enrollment: 2,960 (2024–2025)
- Student to teacher ratio: 16.46
- Colors: Green, gold, and white
- Athletics conference: Hoosier Crossroads Conference
- Nickname: Shamrocks
- Newspaper: The Westfield Lantern
- Yearbook: Shamrocket
- Website: whs.wws.k12.in.us

Westfield High School is a public high school located in Westfield, Indiana, north of Indianapolis. Westfield High School is part of the Westfield Washington School District and is commonly abbreviated as "WHS"

== History ==
The shamrock was chosen to represent the school's athletic teams due to the significant population of Quakers living in the community who preferred a nonviolent mascot. From 1968, up until 1997, the school was on the south side of Hoover Street. The former high school is still standing, and forms the west end of Westfield Middle School. Before the old high school was built, WHS was located by S.R. 32, east of U.S. 31. This school at one time served grades Kindergarten and 7–12. In 1970, the auditorium and gymnasium were burnt down. The school still served as the junior high, although there was no auditorium or gym. A new middle school was built in 1976. In the fall of 1997, the school relocated to its current location at the intersection of Hoover and Union Streets, just north of the old school.

In 2014, Riverview Health agreed to pay $1.5 million, for over 10 years for the naming rights to Westfield High School's football stadium.

On August 21, 2015, Westfield High School officially opened its new $7.5 million stadium to the public for their first home game, which they won 38–21 against Harrison.

== Athletics ==
Westfield athletic teams, nicknamed the Shamrocks, compete in the Hoosier Crossroads Conference. WHS is a 4A school in Indiana's class system for athletics, except for football, in which Westfield is a 6A school. Westfield's mascot which appears at many athletic events, is named Rocky and resembles a combination of the University of Notre Dame's fighting leprechaun logo and Purdue University's "Purdue Pete." Westfield's Girls' Cross Country team has been a powerhouse throughout Indiana for the past decade and a half, including four state championships: 1998, 2005, 2006, and 2007. Westfield Boys' golf has also won three state championships in 2013, 2015 and 2016. After two prior trips to the state finals in football (2A in '92 and 5A in '13) the Rocks won their first State Championship in class 5A football during the '16-'17 season. The Rocks have been the 6A state runners-up four times after securing their 5A state title, with two losses occurring against the Center Grove Trojans (20' and 21') and two against the Brownsburg Bulldogs (24’ and 25').

Westfield Basketball is home to 2022 Indiana Mr. Basketball Braden Smith (basketball). Smith led Westfield to their first ever sectional title in 2022 taking down their rival the Carmel Greyhounds.

=== Sports offered ===
- Boys' Baseball
- Boys' and Girls' Basketball
- Boys' and Girls' Cross Country (Girl State Champs 4x – 1998–99, 2005–06, 2006–07, 2007–08)
- Boys' Football (2016 State Champs in 5A)
- Boys' and Girls' Golf (Boys State Champs 3x – 2012–13, 2014–15, 2015–16)
- Boys' and Girls' Soccer
- Girls' Softball
- Boys' and Girls' Swimming & Diving
- Boys' and Girls' Tennis
- Boys' and Girls' Track & Field
- Girls' Volleyball
- Boys' Wrestling
- Boys' and Girls Lacrosse
- Boys' and Girls' Rugby (Boys Challenge Cup Champs x2 2021,2023; Girls Challenge Cup Champions 2023)

== The Pride of Westfield ==
Westfield High Schools marching band, "The Pride of Westfield" competes in both Summer and Winter Marching band seasons.

In the fall of 2023, The Pride of Westfield made ISSMA Open Class A State Finals with their show "Uncharted". They got 10th place. This is a first time The Pride of Westfield was in Open Class A.

In 2023 the Winter Winds program won the programs 1st WGI Winds Open Class World Championship. The program also won their 3rd consecutive IPA Winds Scholastic Open State Championship with their show "Falling Through Forever".

In the fall of 2022, The Pride of Westfield won their 2nd consecutive Scholastic A Marching Band State Championship with their show "The Dark Horse".

In 2022 the Winter Winds program won their 2nd consecutive IPA Winds Scholastic Open State Championship with their show "Dangerous Beauty".

In the fall of 2021, The Pride of Westfield won the Scholastic A Marching Band State Championship with their show "A Million Different Faces".

In 2021 the Winter Winds program won the IPA Winds Scholastic Open State Championship with their show "Immortal Beloved". Their show was also voted "Fan Favorite" in a nationwide fan vote.

== Notable alumni ==
- Ryan Pepiot - Major League Baseball (MLB) Pitcher
- Kevin Plawecki - Major League Baseball (MLB) catcher
- Braden Smith - National Basketball Association (NBA) player
- Eriq Zavaleta - Major League Soccer (MLS) player
- Dillon Thieneman - National Football League (NFL) player

== Stage collapse ==
On April 23, 2015, 16 students were injured as the stage in the school's auditorium collapsed during a concert. The story gained national media attention.

== See also ==
- List of high schools in Indiana
