= 2012 Big Ten baseball tournament =

2012 Big Ten Conference baseball tournament
- Teams: 6
- Format: Double-elimination with single bye for top two teams
- Finals site: Huntington Park (Columbus, Ohio); Columbus, OH
- Champions: Purdue (1st title)
- Winning coach: Doug Schreiber (1st title)
- MVP: Kevin Plawecki (Purdue)
- Television: BTN

2012 Big Ten Conference baseball standings
	Conf.				Overall
Team	W		L	PCT	W		L	PCT
No. 15 Purdue ‍†‍‡‍^{y}	17	–	7	.708	45	–	14	.763
Indiana ‍‍‍	16	–	8	.667	32	–	28	.533
Penn State ‍‍‍	15	–	9	.625	29	–	27	.518
Nebraska ‍‍‍	14	–	10	.583	35	–	23	.603
Michigan State ‍‍‍^{y}	13	–	11	.542	37	–	23	.617
Ohio State ‍‍‍	11	–	13	.458	33	–	27	.550
Illinois ‍‍‍	11	–	13	.458	28	–	25	.528
Minnesota ‍‍‍	11	–	13	.458	29	–	27	.518
Iowa ‍‍‍	10	–	14	.417	23	–	27	.460
Michigan ‍‍‍	8	–	16	.333	22	–	34	.393
Northwestern ‍‍‍	6	–	18	.250	18	–	36	.333
† – Conference champion ‡ – Tournament champion y – Invited to the NCAA tournament As of June 30, 2012; Rankings from Coaches' Poll

The 2012 Big Ten Conference baseball tournament was held at Huntington Park in Columbus, Ohio, from May 23 through 26. The top six teams from the regular season participate in the double-elimination tournament to determine the league champion. Purdue won their first tournament championship and earned the Big Ten Conference's automatic bid to the 2012 NCAA Division I baseball tournament. This was also Purdue's second year ever winning a conference championship in baseball, having won the conference regular season in 1909.

== Format and seeding ==
The 2012 tournament will be a 6-team double-elimination tournament, with seeds determined by conference regular season winning percentage. The top two seeds will receive a single bye into the semifinals (2nd Round). The 1 seed will play the lowest seeded Round 1 winner, while the 2 seed will play the highest seeded Round 1 winner.

Team	W	L	PCT	GB	Seed
Purdue	17	7	.708	–	1
Indiana	16	8	.667	1	2
Penn State	15	9	.625	2	3
Nebraska	14	10	.583	3	4
Michigan State	13	11	.542	4	5
Ohio State	11	13	.458	6	6
Illinois	11	13	.458	6	–
Minnesota	11	13	.458	6	–
Iowa	10	14	.417	7	–
Michigan	8	16	.333	9	–
Northwestern	6	18	.250	11	–

== Tournament ==
Upper round 1	Upper round 2	Upper final	Final
1	Purdue	5
5	Michigan State	10	6	Ohio State	4
4	Nebraska	9	1	Purdue	3
2	Indiana	0
2	Indiana	6
6	Ohio State	12	5	Michigan State	4
3	Penn State	5
1	Purdue	6
2	Indiana	5
Lower round 1	Lower round 2	Lower round 3	Lower final
5	Michigan State	3*
6	Ohio State	2	2	Indiana	4*
4	Nebraska	2	5	Michigan State	6
4	Nebraska	12	6	Ohio State	6
3	Penn State	3

* - Indicates game required 11 innings.

== All-Tournament Team ==
The following players were named to the All-Tournament Team. Additional honorees at first base and shortstop were due to ties.

Pos	Name	School
P	Jonny Hoffman	Indiana
P	Tony Bucciferro	Michigan State
P	Lance Breedlove	Purdue
C	Kevin Plawecki	Purdue
1B	Ryan Krill	Michigan State
1B	Richard Stock	Nebraska
2B	Micah Johnson	Indiana
3B	Cameron Perkins	Purdue
SS	Kirby Pellant	Ohio State
SS	David Miller	Purdue
OF	Will Nolden	Indiana
OF	Anthony Cheky	Michigan State
OF	Barrett Serrato	Purdue
DH	Michael Pritchard	Nebraska

=== Most Outstanding Player ===
Kevin Plawecki was named Most Outstanding Player. Plawecki was a junior catcher for Purdue, and also claimed the regular season Big Ten Conference Baseball Player of the Year award.
