= 2012 Florida State Seminoles baseball team =

American college baseball season

2012 Florida State Seminoles baseball

ACC Regular season Champion ACC Atlantic Division Champion

Tallahassee Regional Tallahassee Super Regional College World Series
- Conference: Atlantic Coast Conference
- Atlantic Division

Ranking
- Coaches: No. 4
- CB: No. 4
- Record: 50–17 (24–6 ACC)
- Head coach: Mike Martin (33rd season)
- Assistant coaches: Mike Bell (1st season); Mike Martin, Jr. (15th season); Matt Matulia (2nd season)
- Captain: James Ramsey
- Home stadium: Mike Martin Field at Dick Howser Stadium (Capacity: 6,700)

2012 Atlantic Coast Conference baseball standings
	Conf.						Overall
Team	W		L		T	PCT	W		L		T	PCT
Atlantic
No. 3 Florida State ^{x}‍‍‍^{y}	24	–	6	–	0	.800	50	–	17	–	0	.746
No. 16 NC State ‍‍‍^{y}	19	–	11	–	0	.633	39	–	17	–	0	.696
Clemson ‍‍‍^{y}	16	–	14	–	0	.533	34	–	26	–	0	.567
Wake Forest ‍‍‍	13	–	17	–	0	.433	33	–	24	–	0	.579
Maryland ‍‍‍	10	–	20	–	0	.333	32	–	24	–	0	.571
Boston College ‍‍‍	10	–	20	–	0	.333	21	–	34	–	0	.382
Coastal
No. 5 North Carolina ^{x}‍‍‍^{y}	22	–	8	–	0	.733	44	–	14	–	0	.759
No. 15 Virginia ‍‍‍^{y}	18	–	12	–	0	.600	39	–	16	–	1	.705
No. 21 Miami ‍‍‍^{y}	16	–	14	–	0	.533	36	–	21	–	0	.632
No. 24 Georgia Tech ‍‍‡‍^{y}	12	–	18	–	0	.400	37	–	24	–	0	.607
Virginia Tech ‍‍‍	11	–	19	–	0	.367	34	–	21	–	0	.618
Duke ‍‍‍	9	–	21	–	0	.300	21	–	34	–	0	.382
x – Division champion ‡ – Tournament champion y – Invited to the 2012 NCAA Division I baseball tournament As of June 1, 2012; Rankings from Coaches' Poll

The 2012 Florida State Seminoles baseball team represented Florida State University in the 2012 NCAA Division I baseball season. The Seminoles played their home games at Mike Martin Field at Dick Howser Stadium, named for 33rd year head coach Mike Martin.

Florida State spent large parts of the season as the nation's top-ranked team, won their sixth consecutive Atlantic Division title and advanced to their fifth consecutive Super Regional. The Seminoles went on to appear in the College World Series for the fifteenth time, where they reached the semifinals.

== Roster ==
2012 Florida State Seminoles baseball team
Players
Coaches

#	Pos.	Name	B/T	Height	Weight	Year	Home town
1	INF	Giovanny Alfonzo	R/R	5 ft 10 in (1.78 m)	165 lb (75 kg)	Fr	Port St. Lucie, FL
2	OF	Josh Delph	L/L	6 ft 0 in (1.83 m)	185 lb (84 kg)	Fr	Bartow, FL
3	OF	John Nogowski	R/L	6 ft 2 in (1.88 m)	210 lb (95 kg)	Fr	Tallahassee, FL
4	INF	Anthony Howard	R/R	6 ft 0 in (1.83 m)	195 lb (88 kg)	Jr	Lake City, FL
5	OF	Bert Givens	R/R	6 ft 1 in (1.85 m)	195 lb (88 kg)	Fr	Tallahassee, FL
6	OF	Sean O'Brien	R/R	6 ft 2 in (1.88 m)	195 lb (88 kg)	So	Clearwater, FL
7	RHP	Luke Weaver	R/R	6 ft 2 in (1.88 m)	160 lb (73 kg)	Fr	DeLand, FL
8	INF	Devon Travis	R/R	5 ft 9 in (1.75 m)	180 lb (82 kg)	Jr	Wellington, FL
9	C	Stephen McGee	R/R	6 ft 3 in (1.91 m)	220 lb (100 kg)	RS So	Port St. Lucie, FL
10	INF	Justin Gonzalez	R/R	6 ft 2 in (1.88 m)	200 lb (91 kg)	Jr	Miami, FL
12	LHP	Cody Alling	L/L	5 ft 11 in (1.8 m)	160 lb (73 kg)	Fr	Pensacola, FL
13	INF	John Holland	L/R	5 ft 11 in (1.8 m)	180 lb (82 kg)	Fr	Johns Creek, GA
14	LHP	Kyle Bird	L/L	6 ft 2 in (1.88 m)	180 lb (82 kg)	Fr	Orange Park, FL
15	LHP	Evan Geist	R/L	6 ft 3 in (1.91 m)	195 lb (88 kg)	RS Fr	Roswell, GA
16	INF	Jayce Boyd	R/R	6 ft 3 in (1.91 m)	200 lb (91 kg)	Jr	Cantonment, FL
17	RHP	Mike Compton	R/R	6 ft 2 in (1.88 m)	195 lb (88 kg)	Fr	Branson, MO
18	OF	Seth Miller	L/L	6 ft 2 in (1.88 m)	200 lb (91 kg)	Jr	Southport, FL
19	RHP	Gage Smith	R/R	6 ft 1 in (1.85 m)	190 lb (86 kg)	RS So	Tallahassee, FL
20	OF	Stephen Spradling	R/R	6 ft 0 in (1.83 m)	205 lb (93 kg)	Jr	Boynton Beach, FL
22	RHP	Robert Benincasa	R/R	6 ft 2 in (1.88 m)	195 lb (88 kg)	Jr	Tampa, FL
23	RHP	James Ramsey	L/R	6 ft 0 in (1.83 m)	190 lb (86 kg)	Sr	Alpharetta, GA
24	LHP	Brain Busch	L/L	6 ft 2 in (1.88 m)	237 lb (108 kg)	Sr	Boca Raton, FL
26	RHP	Scott Sitz	R/R	5 ft 10 in (1.78 m)	210 lb (95 kg)	Jr	Jacksonville Beach, FL
27	C	Mario Amaral	R/R	6 ft 1 in (1.85 m)	220 lb (100 kg)	Fr	Hialeah, FL
28	C	Lee Howard	R/R	6 ft 0 in (1.83 m)	190 lb (86 kg)	Fr	Fleming Island, FL
30	RHP	Hunter Scantling	R/R	6 ft 8 in (2.03 m)	270 lb (122 kg)	Sr	Jacksonville, FL
32	INF	Sherman Johnson	L/R	5 ft 10 in (1.78 m)	183 lb (83 kg)	Sr	Tampa, FL
33	LHP	Bryant Holtmann	R/L	6 ft 5 in (1.96 m)	200 lb (91 kg)	Fr	New Baden, IL
35	LHP	Jordan Priddle	L/L	6 ft 2 in (1.88 m)	195 lb (88 kg)	Fr	Tallahassee, FL
37	LHP	Brandon Leibrandt	L/L	6 ft 4 in (1.93 m)	195 lb (88 kg)	Fr	Alpharetta, GA
40	RHP	Peter Miller	R/R	6 ft 1 in (1.85 m)	195 lb (88 kg)	So	Lutz, FL
42	RHP	Michael Cetta	R/R	6 ft 0 in (1.83 m)	198 lb (90 kg)	Fr	Miami, FL
44	RHP	Mack Waugh	R/R	6 ft 2 in (1.88 m)	185 lb (84 kg)	Sr	Naples, FL
51	LHP	Brandon Johnson	L/L	6 ft 2 in (1.88 m)	200 lb (91 kg)	So	Tampa, FL
53	INF	Jose Brizuela	L/R	6 ft 0 in (1.83 m)	187 lb (85 kg)	Fr	Weston, FL

Head coach

Mike Martin

Assistant coach(es)

Mike Martin, Jr.

Pitching coach(es)

Mike Bell

Legend

- (C) Team captain
- (S) Suspended
- (I) Ineligible
- Injured
- Current redshirt

Roster
Last update: 2012-06-08

== Rankings ==
Ranking movements Legend: ██ Increase in ranking ██ Decrease in ranking
	Week																
Poll	Pre	1	2	3	4	5	6	7	8	9	10	11	12	13	14	15	Final
Coaches'	9	9*	9	8	6	4	4	2	1	2	1	1	1	1	1	3	4
Baseball America	20	18	13	12	7	6	4	2	1	1	1	1	1	1	1	5	4
Collegiate Baseball^	13	11	10	8	6	5	5	3	2	5	5	2	1	6	5	4	4
NCBWA†	10	8	8	8	6	4	4	2	1	2	1	1	1	3	1	2	4

^ Collegiate Baseball ranked 40 teams in their preseason poll, but only ranked 30 teams weekly during the season.
† NCBWA ranks 30 teams in their preseason poll, but only ranks 25 teams weekly during the season.
* A new poll was not released for this week, so for comparison purposes, the previous week's ranking is inserted in this week's slot.
