= 2012 Atlantic Coast Conference baseball tournament =

American college baseball tournament

- 2012 ACC baseball tournament logo
- Teams: 8
- Format: 2 division round robin and championship game
- Finals site: NewBridge Bank Park; Greensboro, NC
- Champions: Georgia Tech Yellow Jackets (8th title)
- Winning coach: Danny Hall (4th title)
- MVP: Jake Davies (Georgia Tech Yellow Jackets)
- Television: ACCRSN

The 2012 Atlantic Coast Conference baseball tournament was held at the NewBridge Bank Park in Greensboro, North Carolina, from May 23 through 27. All of the games were shown live on Fox Sports South with select games being shown on Fox Sports Florida, Comcast Mid-Atlantic, Sun Sports, and New England Sports Network. Eighth seeded Georgia Tech won the tournament and earned the Atlantic Coast Conference's automatic bid to the 2012 NCAA Division I baseball tournament. It was Georgia Tech's eighth ACC tournament win. This was the first time in which an eighth seeded team won the tournament.

== Seeding ==
Seeding based on team's conference winning percentage. Top team from each division is ranked 1st and 2nd followed by the six teams with the next best conference winning percentage, regardless of division.

Atlantic Division
Team	W	L	Pct	Seed
Florida State	24	6	.800	1
NC State	19	11	.633	3
Clemson	16	14	.533	5
Wake Forest	13	17	.433	7
Maryland	10	20	.333	
Boston College	10	20	.333	

Coastal Division
Team	W	L	Pct	Seed
North Carolina	22	8	.733	2
Virginia	18	12	.600	4
Miami	16	14	.533	6
Georgia Tech	12	18	.400	8
Virginia Tech	11	19	.367	
Duke	9	21	.300	

== Tournament ==
	Division A	FSU	UVA	CLEM	GT	Overall
1	Florida State (24–6)		L 0–7	L 7–9	L 4–5	0–3
4	Virginia (18–12)	W 7–0		W 3–2	L 5–17‡	2–1
5	Clemson (16–14)	W 9–7	L 2–3		L 1–5	1–2
8	Georgia Tech (12–18)	W 5–4	W 17–5‡	W 5–1		3–0

	Division B	UNC	NCSU	UM	WF	Overall
2	North Carolina (22–8)		W 4–0†	L 3–5	W 6–0	2–1^{1}
3	NC State (19–11)	L 0–4†		W 3–2	L 3–7	1–2
6	Miami (16–14)	W 5–3	L 2–3		W 6–3	2–1^{1}
7	Wake Forest (13–17)	L 0–6	W 7–3	L 3–6		1–2

Finals
A	#8 Georgia Tech	8
B	#6 Miami	5

Notes
† - Denotes extra innings
‡ - Denotes game shortened due to mercy rule
1 - Miami beat North Carolina head-to-head

== Results ==
All times shown are US EDT. All games, except the championship game, will have a 10-run rule in effect.

=== Division A ===
Wednesday, May 23 11:00 a.m.
Team	1	2	3	4	5	6	7	8	9	R	H	E
#8 Georgia Tech	2	0	0	1	2	0	0	0	0	5	7	1
#1 Florida State	0	0	0	0	3	0	0	0	1	4	7	0
WP: Buck Farmer LP: Scott Sitz Sv: Alex Cruz; Home runs: GT: Jake Davies (2); FSU: James Ramsey; Attendance: 2,976; Boxscore

Thursday, May 24 11:00 a.m.
Team	1	2	3	4	5	6	7	8	9	R	H	E
#5 Clemson	0	0	0	0	0	1	0	1	0	2	5	0
#4 Virginia	0	0	1	0	0	0	0	2	X	3	5	2
WP: Kyle Crockett LP: Mike Kent Sv: Justin Thompson; Home runs: CLEM: Jon McGibbon; UVA: None; Attendance: 3,331; Boxscore

Friday, May 25 11:00 a.m.
Team	1	2	3	4	5	6	7	8	9	R	H	E
#4 Virginia	0	2	1	0	1	1	0	–	–	5	9	0
#8 Georgia Tech	0	0	6	4	0	2	5	–	–	17	14	2
WP: Cole Pitts LP: Scott Silverstein; Home runs: UVA: None; GT: Jake Davies, Zane Evans, Mott Hyde; Attendance: 3,805; Notes: Game ended in the bottom of the seventh inning due to the Mercy rule. Boxscore

Friday, May 25 3:00 p.m.
Team	1	2	3	4	5	6	7	8	9	R	H	E
#1 Florida State	0	0	4	0	1	0	0	2	0	7	11	2
#5 Clemson	0	1	0	1	2	0	0	2	3	9	11	0
WP: Patrick Andrews LP: Robert Benincasa; Home runs: FSU: Justin Gonzalez; CLEM: Jon McGibbon; Attendance: 3,282; Boxscore

Saturday, May 26 11:00 a.m.
Team	1	2	3	4	5	6	7	8	9	R	H	E
#8 Georgia Tech	2	1	2	0	0	0	0	0	0	5	10	1
#5 Clemson	1	0	0	0	0	0	0	0	0	1	5	2
WP: Jake Davies LP: Kevin Pohle Sv: Alex Cruz; Home runs: GT: Jake Davies; CLEM: Steve Wilkerson; Attendance: 3,272; Boxscore

Saturday, May 26 3:00 p.m.
Team	1	2	3	4	5	6	7	8	9	R	H	E
#1 Florida State	0	0	0	0	0	0	0	0	0	0	5	2
#4 Virginia	0	0	0	1	0	0	6	0	X	7	12	0
WP: Artie Lewicki LP: Mike Compton; Home runs: FSU: None; UVA: None; Attendance: 3,642; Boxscore

=== Division B ===
Wednesday, May 23 3:00 p.m.
Team	1	2	3	4	5	6	7	8	9	R	H	E
#6 Miami	0	0	0	0	0	2	0	0	0	2	7	1
#3 NC State	0	0	0	0	0	1	0	0	2	3	13	0
WP: Vance Williams LP: Eric Nedeljkovic; Home runs: UM: Chantz Mack; NCSU: None; Attendance: 3,060; Boxscore

Wednesday, May 23 7:00 p.m.
Team	1	2	3	4	5	6	7	8	9	R	H	E
#7 Wake Forest	0	0	0	0	0	0	0	0	0	0	4	1
#2 North Carolina	0	0	4	1	0	0	0	1	X	6	9	0
WP: Tate Parrish LP: Tim Cooney; Home runs: WF: None; UNC: None; Attendance: 4,646; Boxscore

Thursday, May 24 3:00 p.m.
Team	1	2	3	4	5	6	7	8	9	R	H	E
#2 North Carolina	0	0	1	0	0	0	2	0	0	3	9	2
#6 Miami	1	0	0	1	1	0	2	0	X	5	7	1
WP: Steven Ewing LP: Kent Emanuel Sv: A. J. Salcines; Home runs: UNC: Grayson Atwood; UM: Dale Carey; Attendance: 3,442; Boxscore

Thursday, May 24 7:00 p.m.
Team	1	2	3	4	5	6	7	8	9	R	H	E
#3 NC State	1	0	1	0	0	0	0	0	1	3	8	1
#7 Wake Forest	0	1	3	0	2	0	0	1	X	7	8	0
WP: Jack Fischer LP: Anthony Tzamtzis; Home runs: NCSU: Trea Turner; WF: None; Attendance: 4,130; Boxscore

Friday, May 25 7:00 p.m.
Team	1	2	3	4	5	6	7	8	9	R	H	E
#6 Miami	0	1	0	1	0	1	3	0	0	6	9	1
#7 Wake Forest	0	1	0	1	0	0	0	0	1	3	9	2
WP: Eric Whaley LP: Brian Holmes Sv: Eric Nedeljkovic; Home runs: UM: Rony Rodriguez; WF: Carlos Lopez; Attendance: 3,286; Boxscore

Saturday, May 26 7:00 p.m.
Team	1	2	3	4	5	6	7	8	9	10	11	12	R	H	E
#2 North Carolina	0	0	0	0	0	0	0	0	0	0	0	4	4	9	2
#3 NC State	0	0	0	0	0	0	0	0	0	0	0	0	0	5	0
WP: Mike Morin LP: D. J. Thomas; Home runs: UNC: None; NCSU: None; Attendance: 10,229; Notes: Attendance set a record for highest in tournament history. (Surpassed in 2013); Boxscore

=== Championship final ===
Sunday, May 27 Noon
Team	1	2	3	4	5	6	7	8	9	R	H	E
#8 Georgia Tech	4	1	1	0	0	0	2	0	0	8	15	3
#6 Miami	1	0	2	0	1	1	0	0	0	5	5	3
WP: Jarrett Didrick LP: Javi Salas Sv: Zane Evans; Home runs: GT: Mott Hyde; UM: Michael Broad; Attendance: 3,825; Notes: Georgia Tech became the first #8 seed to win the tournament Boxscore

== All-Tournament Team ==
Position	Player	School
C	Zane Evans	Georgia Tech
1B	Jon McGibbon	Clemson
2B	Thomas Smith	Georgia Tech
3B	Trea Turner	NC State
SS	Justin Gonzalez	Florida State
OF	Chantz Mack	Miami
OF	Colin Harrington	Virginia
OF	Brandon Thomas	Georgia Tech
DH/UT	Jake Davies	Georgia Tech
P	Carlos Rodon	NC State
P	Eric Whaley	Miami
MVP	Jake Davies	Georgia Tech

== See also ==
- College World Series
- NCAA Division I Baseball Championship
