= 2012 Virginia Cavaliers baseball team =

American college baseball season

2012 Virginia Cavaliers baseball

Charlottesville Regional 1–2
- Conference: Atlantic Coast Conference
- Record: 39–19–1 (18–12 ACC)
- Head coach: Brian O'Connor (9th season)
- Assistant coaches: Kevin McMullan (9th season); Karl Kuhn (9th season); Matt Kirby (1st season)
- Home stadium: Davenport Field

2012 Atlantic Coast Conference baseball standings
	Conf.						Overall
Team	W		L		T	PCT	W		L		T	PCT
Atlantic
No. 3 Florida State ^{x}‍‍‍^{y}	24	–	6	–	0	.800	50	–	17	–	0	.746
No. 16 NC State ‍‍‍^{y}	19	–	11	–	0	.633	39	–	17	–	0	.696
Clemson ‍‍‍^{y}	16	–	14	–	0	.533	34	–	26	–	0	.567
Wake Forest ‍‍‍	13	–	17	–	0	.433	33	–	24	–	0	.579
Maryland ‍‍‍	10	–	20	–	0	.333	32	–	24	–	0	.571
Boston College ‍‍‍	10	–	20	–	0	.333	21	–	34	–	0	.382
Coastal
No. 5 North Carolina ^{x}‍‍‍^{y}	22	–	8	–	0	.733	44	–	14	–	0	.759
No. 15 Virginia ‍‍‍^{y}	18	–	12	–	0	.600	39	–	16	–	1	.705
No. 21 Miami ‍‍‍^{y}	16	–	14	–	0	.533	36	–	21	–	0	.632
No. 24 Georgia Tech ‍‍‡‍^{y}	12	–	18	–	0	.400	37	–	24	–	0	.607
Virginia Tech ‍‍‍	11	–	19	–	0	.367	34	–	21	–	0	.618
Duke ‍‍‍	9	–	21	–	0	.300	21	–	34	–	0	.382
x – Division champion ‡ – Tournament champion y – Invited to the 2012 NCAA Division I baseball tournament As of June 1, 2012; Rankings from Coaches' Poll

The 2012 Virginia Cavaliers baseball team represented the University of Virginia in the 2012 NCAA Division I baseball season. Head Coach Brian O'Connor is in his 9th year coaching the Cavaliers. They are coming off a 2011 season, in which they reached the College World Series.

== Personnel ==
2012 Virginia Cavaliers Roster
Pitchers: 3 Kyle Crockett – Sophomore; 16 Branden Kline – Junior; 17 Shane Halley – Senior; 19 Joel Effertz – Junior; 20 Ryan Ashooh – Sophomore; 21 Barrett O'Neill – Freshman; 29 Scott Silverstein – (redshirt) Junior; 31 Justin Thompson – Senior; 33 Nick Howard – Junior; 34 Artie Lewicki – Sophomore; 39 Austin Young – Sophomore; 46 Nathaniel Abel – Freshman; 47 Whit Mayberry – (redshirt) Sophomore	Infielders: 2 Keith Werman – Senior; 7 Branden Cogswell – Freshman; 9 Kenny Towns – Freshman; 11 Stephen Bruno – Junior; 13 Jared King- (redshirt) Junior; 37 Thomas Woodruff – Freshman; 30 Rob Amaro – (redshirt) Sophomore; Utility: 10 Brandon Downes – Freshman; 25 Reed Gragnani – (redshirt) Junior; 33 Nick Howard – Freshman	Catchers: 18 Nate Irving – Freshman; 8 Chance Mitchell – Junior; Outfielders: 5 Mitchell Shifflet – Sophomore; 6 Chris Taylor – Junior; 14 Colin Harrington – (redshirt) Sophomore; 23 Derek Fisher – Freshman; 38 Mike Papi – Freshman

== Schedule ==
Legend
	Virginia win
	Virginia loss
	Tie
	Postponement/Cancelled
**Bold**	Virginia team member

2012 Virginia Cavaliers baseball game log
Regular season
February

Date	Opponent	Rank	Site/stadium	Score	Win	Loss	Save	Attendance	Overall record	ACC record
February 17	vs Boston College		Conway, S.C.	5–3					0–1	–
February 18	vs Coastal Carolina		Conway, S.C.	9–3					1–1	–
February 18	James Madison		BB&T Coastal Field	4–4					1–1–1	–
February 21	Willam & Mary		Davenport Field	6–5^{11}					2–1–1	–
February 24	Monmouth		Davenport Field	18–4					3–1–1	–
February 25	Monmouth		Davenport Field	7–1					4–1–1	–
February 26	Monmouth		Davenport Field	13–1					5–1–1	–
February 28	Liberty		Davenport Field	8–0					5–2–1	–

March

Date	Opponent	Rank	Site/stadium	Score	Win	Loss	Save	Attendance	Overall record	ACC record
March 2	Wright State		Davenport Field	Canceled						
March 3	Seton Hall		Davenport Field	10–4					6–2–1	–
March 3	Wright State		Davenport Field	5–4					6–3–1	–
March 4	Seton Hall		Davenport Field	5–2					6–4–1	–
March 6	James Madison		Veterans Mem. Park	14–6	**Young** (1–0)	Cody (1–1)		917	7–4–1	–
March 9	Virginia Tech*		Davenport Field	10–8^{11}					7–5–1	0–1
March 10	Virginia Tech*		Davenport Field	4–3					8–5–1	1–1
March 11	Virginia Tech*		Davenport Field	6–5					9–5–1	2–1
March 13	Marist		Davenport Field	8–5					10–5–1	2–1
March 14	Marist		Davenport Field	10–2					11–5–1	2–1
March 17	Florida State*		Mike Martin Field	12–3					11–6–1	2–2
March 18	Florida State*		Mike Martin Field	4–3					11–7–1	2–3
March 19	Florida State*		Mike Martin Field	7–5					11–8–1	2–4
March 21	VMI		Davenport Field	12–3					12–8–1	
March 23	Clemson*		Davenport Field	6–3					13–8–1	3–4
March 24	Clemson*		Davenport Field	5–1					14–8–1	4–4
March 25	Clemson*		Davenport Field	5–3					15–8–1	5–4
March 27	Towson		Davenport Field	8–0					16–8–1	
March 28	Towson		Davenport Field	19–5					17–8–1	
March 30	NC State*		Doak Field	5–1	Ogburn (3–1)	**Silverstein** (2–3)		1,942	17–9–1	5–5
March 31	NC State*		Doak Field	5–2					18–9–1	6–5

April

Date	Opponent	Rank	Site/stadium	Score	Win	Loss	Save	Attendance	Overall record	ACC record
April 1	NC State*		Doak Field	7–6					18–10–1	6–6
April 4	James Madison		Davenport Field	15–5					19–10–1	
April 7	Wake Forest*		Davenport Field	9–4					20–10–1	7–6
April 8	Wake Forest*		Davenport Field	4–1					21–10–1	8–6
April 9	Wake Forest*		Davenport Field	11–2					22–10–1	9–6
April 11	George Washington		Davenport Field	16–4					23–10–1	
April 13	North Carolina*		Davenport Field	2–1^{10}					23–11–1	9–7
April 14	North Carolina*		Davenport Field	6–2					23–12–1	9–8
April 15	North Carolina*		Davenport Field	5–3					23–13–1	9–9
April 17	Richmond		Davenport Field	7–5					24–13–1	
April 20	Duke*		Duke	6–3					24–14–1	9–10
April 21	Duke*		Duke	12–3					25–14–1	10–10
April 21	Duke*		Duke	10–3					26–14–1	11–10
April 24	Radford		Davenport Field	3–2^{11}					27–14–1	
April 25	at VCU		The Diamond	7–5					28–14–1	
April 28	Miami (FL)*		Alex Rodriguez Park at Mark Light Field	7–3	**Kline** (6–3)	Erickson (6–5)		2,750	29–14–1	12–10
April 29	Miami (FL)*		Mark Light Field	7–4					30–14–1	13–10
April 30	Miami (FL)*		Mark Light Field	3–4					31–14–1	14–10

May

Date	Opponent	Rank	Site/stadium	Score	Win	Loss	Save	Attendance	Overall record	ACC record
May 1	Mount St. Mary's		Davenport Field	Canceled						
May 9	High Point		Davenport Field	12–3					32–14–1	
May 11	Georgia Tech*		Davenport Field	6–5					33–14–1	15–10
May 12	Georgia Tech*		Davenport Field	4–2					34–14–1	16–10
May 13	Georgia Tech*		Davenport Field	5–1^{10}					34–15–1	16–11
May 15	VCU		Davenport Field	Canceled						
May 17	Maryland*		Shipley Field	7–6	**K. Crockett (4–2)**	Harman (6–4)	**Thompson** (11)	639	35–15–1	17–11
May 18	Maryland*		Shipley Field	10–3					36–15–1	18–11
May 19	Maryland*		Shipley Field	6–5					36–16–1	18–12

Postseason
ACC Tournament

Date	Opponent	Rank	Site/stadium	Score	Win	Loss	Save	Attendance	Tournament record
May 24	Clemson	17	NewBridge Bank Park	3–2					1–0
May 25	Georgia Tech	17	NewBridge Bank Park	17–5					1–1
May 26	#1 Florida State	17	NewBridge Bank Park	7–0	**Lewicki** (4–2)	Compton (10–2)		3,642	2–1

Charlottesville Regional

Date	Opponent	Rank	Site/stadium	Score	Win	Loss	Save	Attendance	Tournament record
June 2	(4) Army		Davenport Field	6–2					1–0
June 3	(3) Appalachian State		Davenport Field	6–5					1–1
June 3	(2) Oklahoma		Davenport Field	5–4					1–2

Rankings from USA TODAY/ESPN Top 25 coaches' baseball poll. Parenthesis indicate tournament seedings.
*ACC Conference games
