= Atlantic Coast Conference Baseball Coach of the Year =

- Awarded for: the most outstanding baseball Coach in the Atlantic Coast Conference
- Country: United States
- First award: 1981
- Currently held by: James Ramsey, Georgia Tech

The Atlantic Coast Conference Baseball Coach of the Year is a baseball award given to the Atlantic Coast Conference's most outstanding coach. The award was first given after the 1981 season.

Eight coaches have won the award more than once, with Mike Martin of Florida State having the most with seven. Of these coaches, four have won in consecutive years, with Brian O'Connor having done so on two occasions with Virginia, but only Dan McDonnell of Louisville has won three consecutive awards. McDonnell won these awards in Louisville's first three seasons as an ACC member.

Of the 15 schools that have played baseball in the ACC since the award was first presented, 10 have had a coach win the award. Among current members, all four exceptions joined the ACC in the 21st century. Virginia Tech joined in 2004 and Boston College joined in 2005, triggering a significant conference realignment in NCAA Division I. A later realignment in 2013 saw Notre Dame and Pittsburgh join the ACC. Maryland, a charter member of the ACC that left for the Big Ten Conference in 2014, never won the award. (Current ACC member Syracuse dropped the sport in 1972, decades before it joined the ACC alongside Notre Dame and Pittsburgh; the other former ACC member, South Carolina, left the ACC in 1971, a decade before the award was established.)

== Key ==
	Awarded one of the following National Coach of the Year awards that year: Collegiate Baseball Coach of the Year (CB); Baseball America Coach of the Year (BA)
Coach (X)	Denotes the number of times the coach had been awarded the Coach of the Year award at that point
*	Elected to the National College Baseball Hall of Fame as a coach but is no longer active
*^	Active coach who has been elected to the National College Baseball Hall of Fame (as a coach)
Conf. W–L	Conference win–loss record for that season
Conf. St.^{T}	Conference standing at year's end (^{T}denotes a tie)
Overall W–L	Overall win–loss record for that season
Season^{‡}	Team won the College World Series

== Winners ==
Season	Coach	School	National Coach of the Year Awards	Conf. W–L	Conf. St.	Overall W–L	Reference
1981	Tom D'Armi	Duke	—	6–6	5	29–10	
1982	Marvin Carter	Wake Forest	—	6–5	3	26–12–1	
1983	Jim Morris	Georgia Tech	—	6–8	5	38–15	
1984	Sam Esposito	NC State	—	9–3	3	32–8	
1985	Dennis Womack	Virginia	—	9–4	2	38–16	
1986	Sam Esposito (2)	NC State	—	11–2	1	35–15	
1987	Jim Morris (2)	Georgia Tech	—	17–4	1	51–14	
1988	Bill Wilhelm*	Clemson	—	18–2	1	54–14	
1989	Mike Roberts	North Carolina	—	15–4	1	41–18–1	
1990	Ray Tanner	NC State	—	14–7	3	48–20	
1991	Bill Wilhelm* (2)	Clemson	—	18–3	1	60–10	
1992	Steve Traylor	Duke	—	12–12	5	38–16	
1993	Jim Morris (3)	Georgia Tech	—	16–6	1	47–14	
1994	Jack Leggett	Clemson	—	20–4	1	57–18	
1995	Jack Leggett (2)	Clemson	—	20–4	1	54–14	
1996	Mike Martin	Florida State	—	19–5	1	52–17	
1997	Danny Hall	Georgia Tech	—	19–4	1	46–15	
1998	Mike Martin (2)	Florida State	—	18–4	1	53–20	
1999	Mike Martin (3)	Florida State	—	22–2	1	57–14	
2000	Danny Hall (2)	Georgia Tech	—	18–6	1	50–16	
2001	Mike Martin (4)	Florida State	—	20–4	1	47–19	
2002	George Greer	Wake Forest	—	17–6	2	47–13	
2003	Elliott Avent	NC State	—	15–9	3	45–18	
2004	Brian O'Connor	Virginia	—	18–6	2	44–15	
2005	Danny Hall (3)	Georgia Tech	—	22–8	1	45–19	
2006	Jack Leggett (3)	Clemson	—	24–6	1 (Atlantic)	53–16	
2007	Mike Martin (5)	Florida State	—	24–6	1 (Atlantic)	49–13	
2008	Jim Morris (4)	Miami (FL)	—	23–5	1 (Coastal)	53–11	
2009	Mike Martin (6)	Florida State	—	19–9	1 (Atlantic)	45–18	
2010	Brian O'Connor (2)	Virginia	—	23–7	1 (Coastal)	51–14	
2011	Brian O'Connor (3)	Virginia	—	22–8	1 (Coastal)	56–12	
2012	Mike Martin (7)	Florida State	BA	24–6	1 (Atlantic)	50–17	
2013	Brian O'Connor (4)	Virginia	—	22–8	2 (Coastal)	50–12	
2014	Brian O'Connor (5)	Virginia	—	22–8	2 (Coastal)	53–16	
2015	Dan McDonnell	Louisville	—	25–5	1 (Atlantic)	47–18	
2016	Dan McDonnell (2)	Louisville	—	22–8	1 (Atlantic)	50–14	
2017	Dan McDonnell (3)	Louisville	BA	23–6	1 (Atlantic)	50–10	
2018	Mike Fox	North Carolina	—	19–11	2 (Atlantic)	42–18	
2019	Danny Hall (4)	Georgia Tech	—	19–11	1 (Atlantic)	41–17	
2020	Season canceled due the COVID-19 pandemic, no awards given						
2021	Link Jarrett	Notre Dame	—	25–10	1 (Atlantic)	34–13	
2022	John Szefc	Virginia Tech	—	19–9	1 (Coastal)	45–14	
2023	Tom Walter	Wake Forest	—	22–7	1 (Atlantic)	51–10	
2024	Scott Forbes	North Carolina	—	22–8	1 (Coastal)	48–16	
2025	Danny Hall (5)	Georgia Tech	—	19–11	1	39–16	
2026	James Ramsey	Georgia Tech	—	25–5	1	45–9	

== Winners by school ==
Because NCAA baseball is a spring sport, the "year joined" is the calendar year before the first season of competition.

School (year joined)	Winners	Years
Florida State (1992)	7	1996, 1998, 1999, 2001, 2007, 2009, 2012
Georgia Tech (1980)	9	1983, 1987, 1993, 1997, 2000, 2005, 2019, 2025, 2026
Virginia (1955)	6	1985, 2004, 2010, 2011, 2013, 2014
Clemson (1954)	5	1988, 1991, 1994, 1995, 2006
NC State (1954)	4	1984, 1986, 1990, 2003
Louisville (2014)	3	2015, 2016, 2017
Wake Forest (1954)	3	1982, 2002, 2023
Duke (1954)	2	1981, 1992
North Carolina (1954)	3	1989, 2018, 2024
Miami (FL) (2005)	1	2008
Notre Dame (2013)	1	2021
Virginia Tech (2004)	1	2022

== Footnotes ==
- ^{a} The University of Maryland left the ACC in 2014 to join the Big Ten.
