= Jim Morris (baseball coach) =

Baseball coach (born 1950)

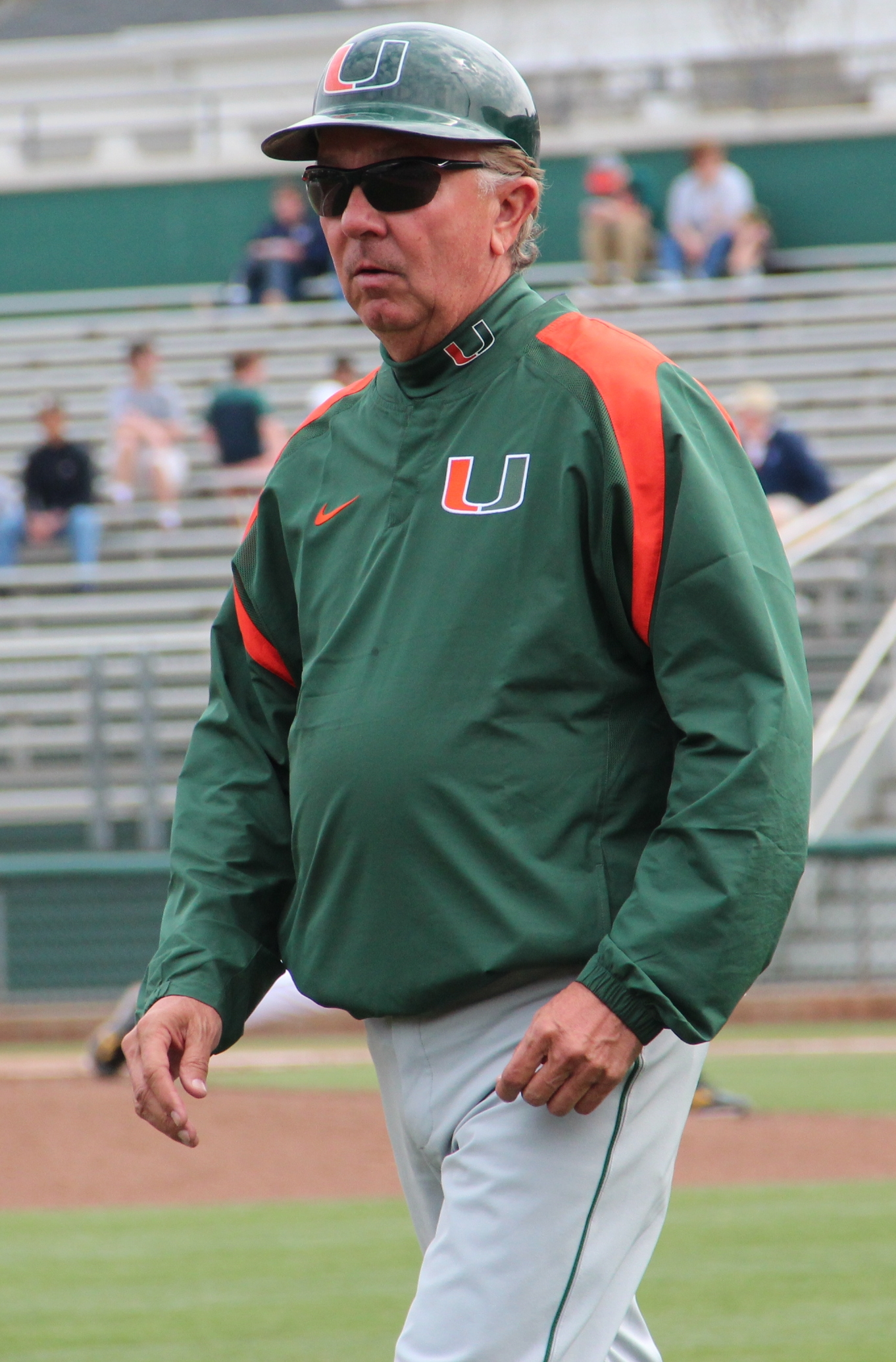
- Morris in 2014

Biographical details
- Born: February 20, 1950 (age 76); Lexington, North Carolina, U.S.
- Education: Elon College (1973)

Coaching career (HC unless noted)
- 1975: Appalachian State (assistant)
- 1976–1979: DeKalb CC
- 1980–1981: Florida State (assistant)
- 1982–1993: Georgia Tech
- 1994–2018: Miami (FL)

Head coaching record
- Overall: 1,590–715–4

Accomplishments and honors

Championships
- 2 College World Series (1999, 2001)

Awards
- 4x ACC Coach of the Year (1983, 1987, 1993, 2008)

Jim Morris (born February 20, 1950) is an American college baseball coach who was the former head coach at the University of Miami and Georgia Tech. His teams qualified for NCAA Regionals for 32 consecutive years, 23 at Miami and nine at Georgia Tech. Morris won national championships in 1999 and 2001, and earned National Coach of the Year honors in both seasons.

== Early career ==
Morris began his coaching career as an assistant at Appalachian State in 1975. In 1976, he accepted the challenge of building, from scratch, a baseball program at Atlanta's DeKalb Community College.

At DeKalb, Morris started with no players and no field, but he quickly made a name for himself. His Eagles were nationally ranked three times in four years and advanced to the 1977 Junior College World Series, where DeKalb placed second. Morris added two more winning years at DeKalb before moving on to become an assistant coach at Florida State.

== Georgia Tech ==
After a two–year stint with the Seminoles, Morris would accept the head coaching job at Georgia Tech. The Yellow Jackets were on the backside of four straight losing seasons and were 4–23 in their first two seasons in the Atlantic Coast Conference. At Georgia Tech, Morris was the all-time leader in coaching victories, in any of the school's varsity sports, as he had 12 straight winning seasons, nine straight NCAA regional berths, four straight Atlantic Coast Conference titles (1985–88) and a school–record 51 wins in 1987.

== Miami ==
In his tenure at the University of Miami, no other program has qualified for the College World Series as often as Morris and his Miami Hurricanes. Miami has qualified for the NCAA tournament a record 44 consecutive years and made it to Omaha in 11 of Morris' first 15 seasons in Coral Gables. Morris set an NCAA record for guiding a program to the College World Series in each of his first six years at the University of Miami. Morris returned Miami to Omaha in 2015 and 2016 after a seven-year absence. It was announced in June 2014 that Morris would retire following the 2018 season with longtime assistant Gino DiMare as his successor.

== Head coaching record ==
Record table
Season	Team	Overall	Conference	Standing	Postseason
Georgia Tech Yellow Jackets (Atlantic Coast Conference) (1982–1993)
1982	Georgia Tech	29–20	6–8	5th	
1983	Georgia Tech	38–15	6–8	5th	
1984	Georgia Tech	36–19	5–7	5th	
1985	Georgia Tech	42–19–1	6–7–1	5th	NCAA Regional
1986	Georgia Tech	45–23	10–4	2nd	NCAA Regional
1987	Georgia Tech	51–14	17–4	1st	NCAA Regional
1988	Georgia Tech	45–24	12–8	3rd	NCAA Regional
1989	Georgia Tech	38–26	13–6	3rd	NCAA Regional
1990	Georgia Tech	46–25	9–9	5th	NCAA Regional
1991	Georgia Tech	42–26	12–8	2nd	NCAA Regional
1992	Georgia Tech	45–19	14–9	4th	NCAA Regional
1993	Georgia Tech	47–14	19–6	1st	NCAA Regional
Georgia Tech:		504–244–1	126–84–1		
Miami Hurricanes (NCAA Division I independent) (1994–2004)
1994	Miami	49–14			College World Series
1995	Miami	48–17			College World Series
1996	Miami	50–14			College World Series Runner-up
1997	Miami	51–18			College World Series
1998	Miami	51–12			College World Series
1999	Miami	50–13			College World Series champions
2000	Miami	41–19–1			NCAA Super Regional
2001	Miami	53–12			College World Series champions
2002	Miami	34–29			NCAA Super Regional
2003	Miami	45–17–1			College World Series
2004	Miami	50–13			College World Series
Miami Hurricanes (Atlantic Coast Conference) (2005–present)
2005	Miami	41–19–1	19–10–1	3rd	NCAA Super Regional
2006	Miami	42–24	17–13	4th (Coastal)	College World Series
2007	Miami	37–24	17–13	3rd (Coastal)	NCAA Regional
2008	Miami	53–11	23–5	1st (Coastal)	College World Series
2009	Miami	38–22	18–12	3rd (Coastal)	NCAA Regional
2010	Miami	43–20	20–10	3rd (Coastal)	NCAA Super Regional
2011	Miami	38–23	19–10	4th (Coastal)	NCAA Regional
2012	Miami	36–23	16–14	3rd (Coastal)	NCAA Regional
2013	Miami	37–25	14–16	5th (Coastal)	NCAA Regional
2014	Miami	44–19	24–6	1st (Coastal)	NCAA Regional
2015	Miami	50–17	22–8	1st (Coastal)	College World Series
2016	Miami	50–14	21–7	1st (Coastal)	College World Series
2017	Miami	31–27	16–13	3rd (Coastal)	
2018	Miami	28–26	16–13	3rd (Coastal)	
Miami:		1,090–472–3	263–151–1		
Total:		1,594–716–4			
National champion Postseason invitational champion Conference regular season champion Conference regular season and conference tournament champion Division regular season champion Division regular season and conference tournament champion Conference tournament champion

== See also ==
- List of college baseball career coaching wins leaders
