= James Ramsey (baseball) =

American baseball player and coach (born 1989)

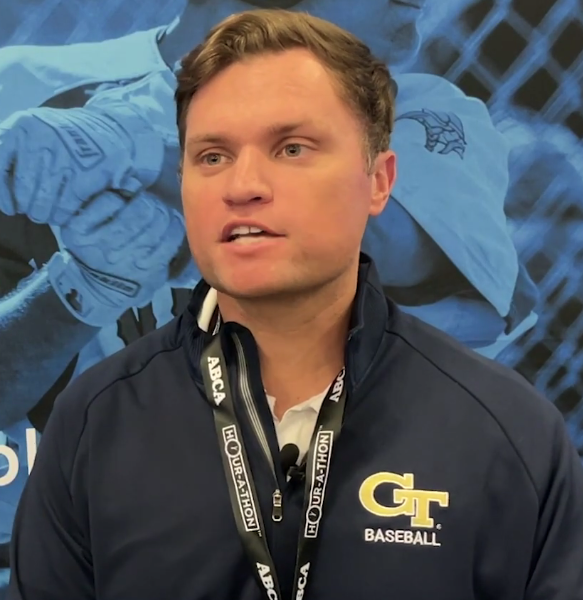
- Ramsey in 2023

Current position
- Title: Head coach
- Team: Georgia Tech
- Conference: ACC
- Record: 50–11 (.820)

Biographical details
- Born: December 19, 1989 (age 36); Alpharetta, Georgia, U.S.

Playing career
- 2009–2012: Florida State
- 2012–2013: Palm Beach Cardinals
- 2013–2014: Springfield Cardinals
- 2013: Memphis Redbirds
- 2014–2015: Columbus Clippers
- 2016: Oklahoma City Dodgers
- 2016–2017: Tacoma Rainiers
- 2018: Rochester Red Wings
- 2018: Chattanooga Lookouts
- Position: Outfielder

Coaching career (HC unless noted)
- 2018: Florida State (OF/H)
- 2019–2025: Georgia Tech (OF/H)
- 2026–present: Georgia Tech

Head coaching record
- Overall: 50–11 (.820)

Accomplishments and honors

Championships
- ACC regular season (2026); ACC tournament (2026)

Awards
- ACC Coach of the Year (2026)

James Brogan Ramsey (born December 19, 1989) is an American college baseball coach and former professional baseball outfielder. He is the head coach for the Georgia Institute of Technology. He played college baseball at Florida State University from 2009 to 2012 for head coach Mike Martin. The St. Louis Cardinals selected him in the first round of the 2012 Major League Baseball draft.

== Amateur career ==
Ramsey attended Wesleyan School in Peachtree Corners, Georgia. In 2008, Wesleyan's baseball team won the state championship. He then enrolled at Florida State University from 2009–12, where he played college baseball for the Florida State Seminoles baseball team. Ramsey was a three-year starter for the Seminoles, helping lead them to the 2010 College World Series and the 2012 College World Series.

As a junior, Ramsey led Florida State in nearly every offensive category and led the Atlantic Coast Conference in total bases, earning third-team All-American and first-team All-ACC honors. Ramsey was drafted by the Minnesota Twins in the 22nd round of the 2011 Major League Baseball draft but opted to return to Florida State.

In 2011, he played collegiate summer baseball in the Cape Cod Baseball League for the Yarmouth-Dennis Red Sox, and was named the East division MVP at the league's annual all-star game.

Ramsey earned even more accolades his senior season when he was named the American Baseball Coaches Association Co-Player of the Year and the ACC Player of the Year and also earned unanimous First Team All-American honors. In total, he batted .378 with 13 home runs and 58 RBIs in 67 games.

In a ceremony on August 26, 2022, Ramsey was inducted into the Seminoles' Hall of Fame.

== Professional career ==
=== St. Louis Cardinals ===
Ramsey was drafted in the first round of the 2012 Major League Baseball draft by the St. Louis Cardinals and signed.

Ramsey spent the 2012 season with the Palm Beach Cardinals, where he played in 56 games, batting .229 with one home run and 14 RBI. He started 2013 with Palm Beach, and after batting .361/.481/.557 with one home run, seven RBI, and five doubles in 18 games, he was promoted to the Springfield Cardinals of the Double-A Texas League and finished the season there, compiling a .251 batting average with 15 home runs and 44 RBI in 93 games. He also played in one game for the Memphis Redbirds at the end of the season. Ramsey began the 2014 season with Springfield, and was selected to play in the 2014 All-Star Futures Game at Target Field in Minneapolis, Minnesota.

=== Cleveland Indians ===
On July 30, 2014, the Cardinals traded Ramsey to the Cleveland Indians in exchange for starting pitcher Justin Masterson. The Indians assigned him to the Columbus Clippers of the Triple-A International League In 95 combined games between Springfield and Columbus in he slashed .295/.382/.509 with 16 home runs and 52 RBI. Ramsey spent 2015 with Columbus where he posted a .243 batting average with 12 home runs and 42 RBI in 126 games. On November 20, 2015, the Indians added Ramsey to their 40-man roster in order to protect him from the Rule 5 draft. Ramsey was designated for assignment by the Indians on April 4, 2016.

=== Los Angeles Dodgers ===
On April 10, 2016, the Indians traded Ramsey and Zach Walters to the Los Angeles Dodgers in exchange for cash. The Dodgers subsequently assigned him to the Triple-A Oklahoma City Dodgers. He was designated for assignment on May 28, but cleared waivers and was outrighted back to Oklahoma City on June 4.

=== Seattle Mariners ===
Ramsey was traded to the Seattle Mariners on August 4, 2016 and subsequently assigned to the Triple-A Tacoma Rainiers. In 110 games between Oklahoma City and Tacoma, he batted .265 with nine home runs and 44 RBI. Ramsey began 2017 back with Tacoma but was released in April.

=== Minnesota Twins ===
On December 15, 2017, Ramsey signed a minor league contract with the Minnesota Twins. He began the season with the Triple-A Rochester Red Wings and was reassigned to the Double-A Chattanooga Lookouts in May. On June 27, 2018, Ramsey was released by the Twins organization.

== Coaching career ==
Ramsey continued his baseball career as a college coach. He was an assistant at Florida State University starting in 2018 and moved to Georgia Tech in 2019. Georgia Tech led the Atlantic Coast Conference (ACC) in hitting (.297) and finished second in run production (464), hits (702), slugging (.462), and finished third in home runs (418) and walks (356) with Ramsey as offensive coach. The Yellow Jackets shown brightly on the national scene in 2019, winning 43 games, 10-straight series (a program record) and nine-straight ACC series. The Yellow Jackets ended regular season and conference tournament play positioned as the No. 3 National Seed and hosts of the Atlanta 2019 NCAA Regional. Ramsey’s coaching, helped consensus all-American Tristin English to command the plate in ACC play, establishing a .381/.462/.825 record with 32 runs, 37 runs batted in and 11 home runs. In the postseason alone, English hit .500 for 16 hits, five doubles, three home runs and 14 RBI.

Ramsey’s approach to hitting and his ability to convey strategy and technique succeeded quickly with Georgia Tech hitters. He imparted patience, strategy and process to the offense that saw ready adoption by the players. Seven players went on to hit better than .299, including designated hitter Michael Guldberg, who led the team at .355 and catcher Kyle McCann, who launched 23 home runs with 70 RBI. Baron Radcliff and Nick Wilhite, were of the greatest beneficiaries of Ramsey’s approach. They became monumental performers in the lineup by raising their averages 77 and 156 points, respectively, from 2018. McCann was drafted in the fourth round of the 2019 MLB draft, while both Guldberg (third round) and Radcliff (fifth round) were selected in the 2020 MLB draft.

After the 2020 season was shortened due to the COVID-19 pandemic, the Yellow Jackets once again showed dominance at the plate in 2021, leading the ACC with a .300 average in 36 league games. In the expanded conference slate, Georgia Tech paced the ACC in runs (251), hits (384), doubles (91), triples (10), RBI (230) and on-base percentage (.383). Under Ramsey’s offensive instruction, Tech boasted four .300 hitters – Kevin Parada (.318), Luke Waddell (.309), Justyn-Henry Malloy (.308) and Andrew Jenkins (.302) – while Drew Compton hit .294 with 13 home runs. Waddell and Malloy were both drafted in the 2021 MLB Draft by the Atlanta Braves in the fifth and sixth rounds, respectively. He "coaches the Yellow Jackets’ outfielders and is the team’s hitting coach, working on both team and individual hitting philosophies. He is also in charge of integrating technology and analytics into player development and evaluation." In 2021, he was promoted to associate head coach while retaining his roles as hitting coach and recruiting coordinator.

With Ramsey as the associate head coach and team's hitting coach, Georgia Tech led the nation in 2022 in team batting average (.327), sixth in slugging percentage (.551), and sixth in on-base percentage (.419). Six of his players were named to the All ACC Baseball Team in 2022.

In an interview with the Atlanta Journal-Constitution, head coach of the Yellow Jackets, Danny Hall, stated “Do I think James Ramsey is capable of being the head coach here at Georgia Tech?... One hundred percent... he’s going to get my endorsement...” In the absence of an official "Head-Coach-in-Waiting" title in the University System of Georgia, "We gave him the title of associate head coach for a reason. We want to do everything we can to encourage him and keep him here." said Hall.

== Head coaching record ==
Record table
Season	Team	Overall	Conference	Standing	Postseason
Georgia Tech Yellow Jackets (Atlantic Coast Conference) (2026–present)
2026	Georgia Tech	50–11	25–5	1st	NCAA Regional
Total:		50–11 (.820)			
National champion Postseason invitational champion Conference regular season champion Conference regular season and conference tournament champion Division regular season champion Division regular season and conference tournament champion Conference tournament champion

== Personal life ==
While at Florida State, Ramsey was a candidate for the Rhodes Scholarship. Ramsey's father also played college baseball for the Seminoles whereas his mother played tennis.

He married Grace Snell on November 26, 2016.
