= Danny Hall (baseball) =

American college baseball coach

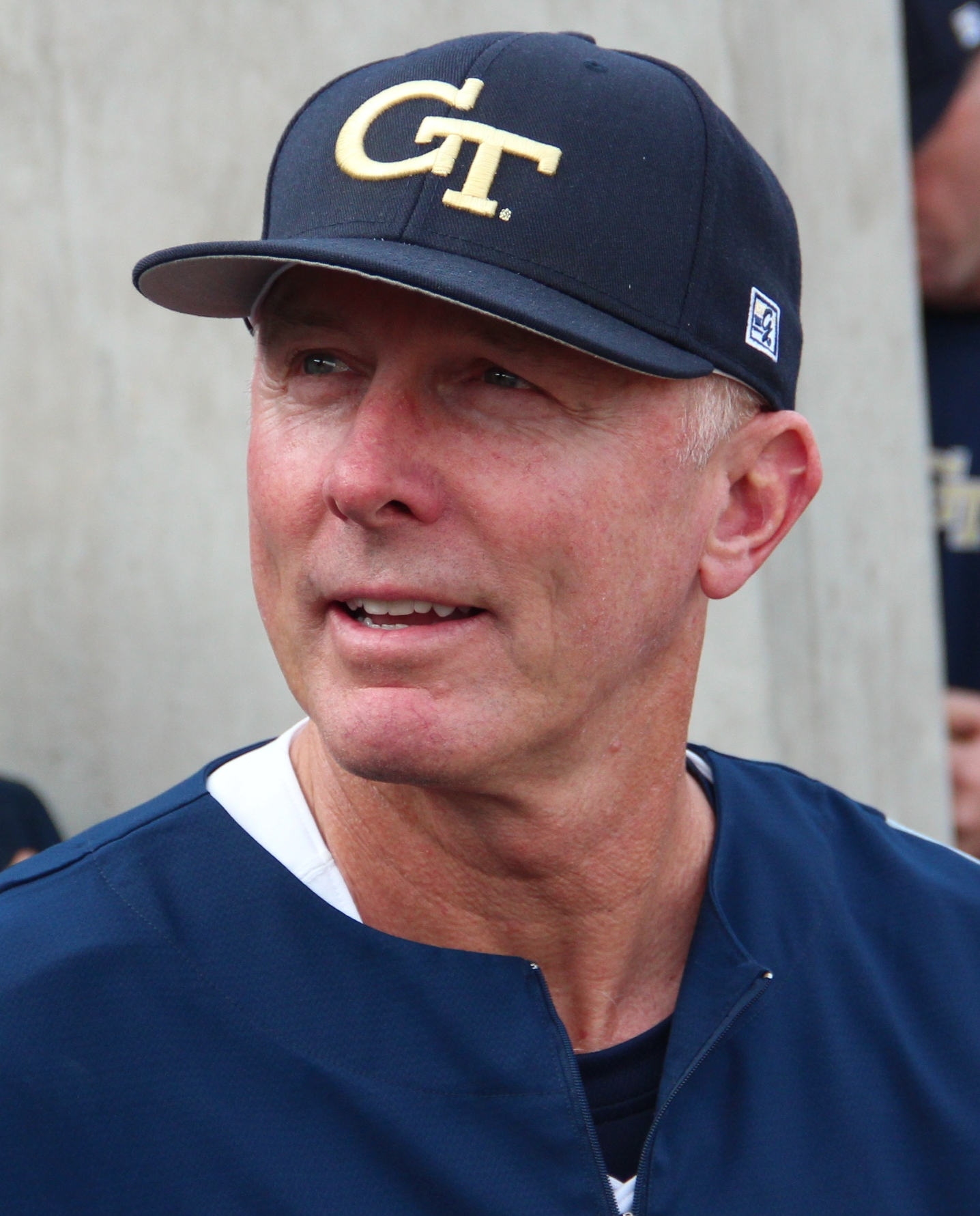
- Hall in 2014

Biographical details
- Born: November 27, 1954 (age 71); Coolville, Ohio, U.S.

Playing career
- 1974–1977: Miami (OH)

Coaching career (HC unless noted)
- 1978–1979: Miami (OH) (Asst.)
- 1980–1987: Michigan (Asst.)
- 1988–1993: Kent State
- 1994–2025: Georgia Tech

Head coaching record
- Overall: 1,452–793–1 (.647)

Accomplishments and honors

Championships
- 2x MAC regular season (1992, 1993); 2x MAC tournament (1992, 1993); 6x ACC regular season (1997, 2000, 2004, 2005, 2011, 2025); 3x ACC Coastal (2011, 2019, 2021); 5× ACC tournament (2000, 2003, 2005, 2012, 2014)

Awards
- 2× MAC Coach of the Year (1992, 1993); 5× ACC Coach of the Year (1997, 2000, 2005, 2019, 2025)

Danny Hall (born November 27, 1954) is an American college baseball former coach for the Georgia Tech Yellow Jackets. He was the head coach of Georgia Tech from 1994 to 2025. Before coming to Tech, he held positions at Miami (OH), Michigan, and Kent State. From 1978 to 1979, he coached at Miami (OH), where he compiled a 69–26 (.726) record. From 1980 to 1987, he coached at Michigan, where he compiled a 368–111–1 record as an assistant coach. From 1988 to 1993, he coached at Kent State, where he compiled a 208–117(.640) record.

Hall's accomplishments put him in the annals of all-time great Georgia Tech coaches. He has compiled an 1,140–605–1 record, has led Tech to post-season play 23 out of 28 full seasons, and has taken Tech to its only College World Series appearances in 1994, 2002, and 2006. From 2004 to 2006, Tech has led the ACC with a 74–38 conference record. Hall's 1,140 wins as head coach make him the winningest head coach in all of Tech sports history. This includes a school-record 52 wins in 2002. Hall is the only current head coach at Tech with a winning record in its rivalry with Georgia, known as Clean, Old-Fashioned Hate. He announced his retirement towards the end of the 2025 collegiate season, with his coaching career ended with an 11-9 loss in the Oxford Regional to host Ole Miss.

== Personal ==
Hall is married to Kara, with whom he has three sons, Danny, Carter and Colin. Carter was selected in the 34th round of the 2015 MLB draft, but chose not to sign and attended Georgia Tech.

== Head coaching record ==
Record table
Season	Team	Overall	Conference	Standing	Postseason
Kent State Golden Flashes (Mid-American Conference) (1988–1993)
1988	Kent State	27–25	14–18	6th	
1989	Kent State	26–24	10–17	8th	
1990	Kent State	35–18	17–10	3rd	
1991	Kent State	34–22	19–11	2nd	
1992	Kent State	45–13	24–7	1st	NCAA Regional
1993	Kent State	41–15	22–10	T–1st	NCAA Regional
Kent State:		208–117	106–73		
Georgia Tech Yellow Jackets (Atlantic Coast Conference) (1994–2025)
1994	Georgia Tech	50–17	16–8	T–2nd	College World Series Runner-up
1995	Georgia Tech	38–22	16–8	3rd	NCAA Regional
1996	Georgia Tech	40–24	13–11	T–3rd	NCAA Regional
1997	Georgia Tech	46–15	19–4	1st	NCAA Regional
1998	Georgia Tech	41–22	14–9	2nd	NCAA Regional
1999	Georgia Tech	38–20	12–12	5th	
2000	Georgia Tech	50–16	18–6	1st	NCAA Super Regional
2001	Georgia Tech	41–20	13–11	4th	NCAA Regional
2002	Georgia Tech	52–16	14–9	5th	College World Series
2003	Georgia Tech	44–18	17–7	2nd	NCAA Regional
2004	Georgia Tech	44–21	18–5	1st	NCAA Super Regional
2005	Georgia Tech	44–19	22–8	1st	NCAA Super Regional
2006	Georgia Tech	50–18	19–11	3rd (Coastal)	College World Series
2007	Georgia Tech	32–25	15–14	4th (Coastal)	
2008	Georgia Tech	41–21	16–14	3rd (Coastal)	NCAA Regional
2009	Georgia Tech	38–19–1	17–10–1	2nd (Coastal)	NCAA Regional
2010	Georgia Tech	47–15	21–9	2nd (Coastal)	NCAA Regional
2011	Georgia Tech	42–21	22–8	T–1st (Coastal)	NCAA Regional
2012	Georgia Tech	38–26	12–18	4th (Coastal)	NCAA Regional
2013	Georgia Tech	32–23	15–15	4th (Coastal)	NCAA Regional
2014	Georgia Tech	36–25	14–16	2nd (Coastal)	NCAA Regional
2015	Georgia Tech	32–23	13–17	5th (Coastal)	
2016	Georgia Tech	38–25	13–16	4th (Coastal)	NCAA Regional
2017	Georgia Tech	27–28	11–19	5th (Coastal)	
2018	Georgia Tech	31–27	14–16	3rd (Coastal)	
2019	Georgia Tech	43–19	19–11	1st (Coastal)	NCAA Regional
2020	Georgia Tech	11–5	2–1	(Coastal)	Season canceled due to COVID-19
2021	Georgia Tech	31–25	21–15	1st (Coastal)	NCAA Regional
2022	Georgia Tech	36–24	16–16	5th (Coastal)	NCAA Regional
2023	Georgia Tech	30–27	12–18	6th (Coastal)	
2024	Georgia Tech	33–25	15–15	5th (Coastal)	NCAA Regional
2025	Georgia Tech	41–19	19–11	1st	NCAA Regional
Georgia Tech:		1,244–676–1 (.648)	498–368–1 (.575)		
Total:		1,452–793–1 (.647)			
National champion Postseason invitational champion Conference regular season champion Conference regular season and conference tournament champion Division regular season champion Division regular season and conference tournament champion Conference tournament champion

== See also ==
- List of college baseball career coaching wins leaders
- List of college baseball coaches with 1,100 wins
