= Georgia Tech Yellow Jackets baseball =

College baseball team

Georgia Tech Yellow Jackets
- 2026 Georgia Tech Yellow Jackets baseball team
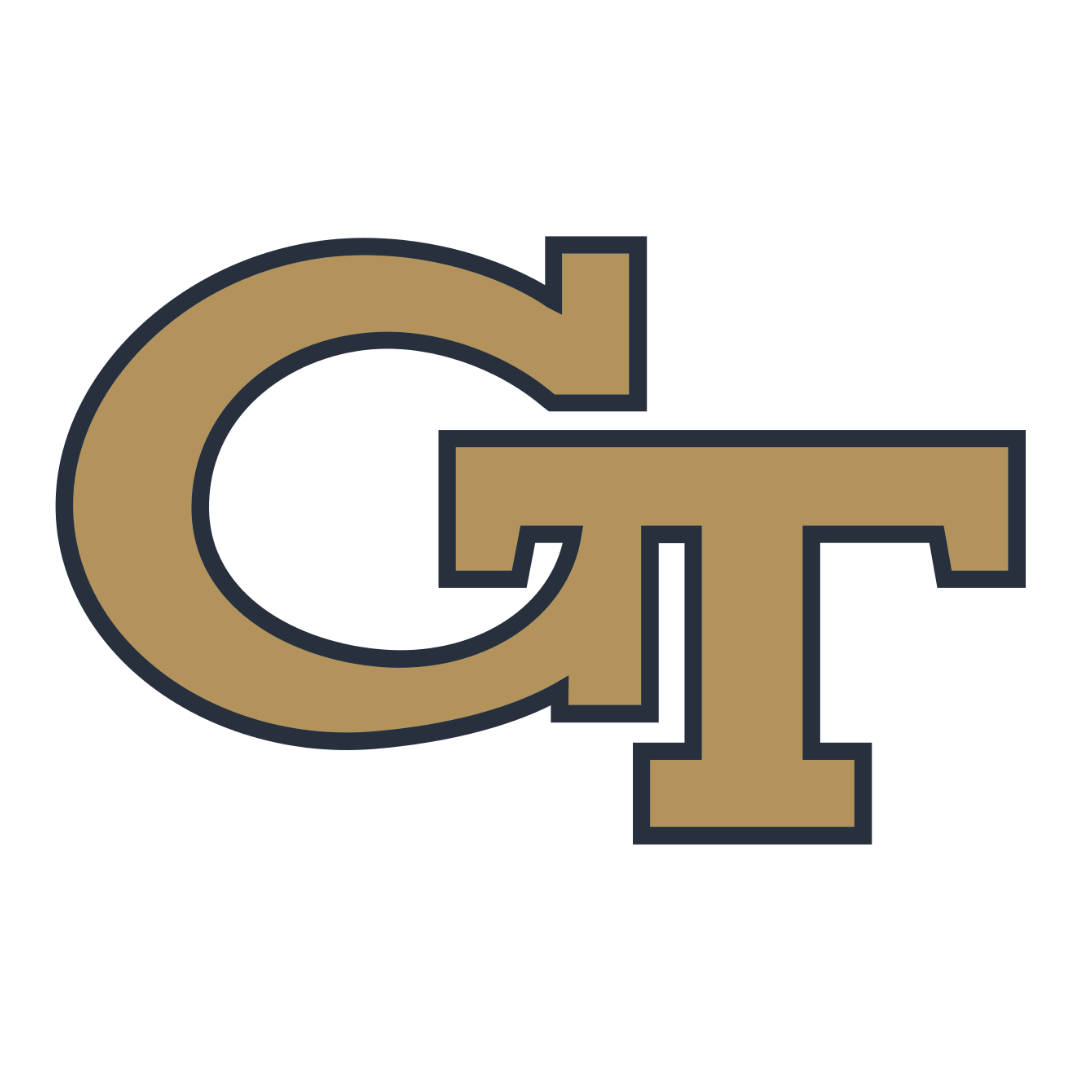
- Founded: 1885 (140 years ago)
- University: Georgia Institute of Technology
- Head coach: James Ramsey (1st season)
- Conference: ACC
- Location: Atlanta, Georgia
- Home stadium: Russ Chandler Stadium (capacity: 3,718)
- Nickname: Yellow Jackets
- Colors: Gold and white

College World Series runner-up
- 1994

College World Series appearances
- 1994, 2002, 2006

NCAA regional champions
- 1994, 2000, 2002, 2004, 2005, 2006

NCAA tournament appearances
- 1959, 1971, 1985, 1986, 1987, 1988, 1989, 1990, 1991, 1992, 1993, 1994, 1995, 1996, 1997, 1998, 2000, 2001, 2002, 2003, 2004, 2005, 2006, 2008, 2009, 2010, 2011, 2012, 2013, 2014, 2016, 2019, 2021, 2022, 2024, 2025, 2026

Conference tournament champions
- ACC: 1985, 1986, 1987, 1988, 2000, 2003, 2005, 2012, 2014, 2026

Conference regular season champions
- SIAA: 1906, 1920, 1921; SoCon: 1923, 1926; SEC: 1957; ACC: 1987, 1993, 1997, 2000, 2004, 2005, 2011 (t), 2025, 2026

The Georgia Tech Yellow Jackets baseball team represents the Georgia Institute of Technology in NCAA Division I college baseball. Along with most other Georgia Tech athletic teams, the baseball team participates in the Atlantic Coast Conference. The Yellow Jackets play their home games in Russ Chandler Stadium and they are currently coached by James Ramsey.

== History ==
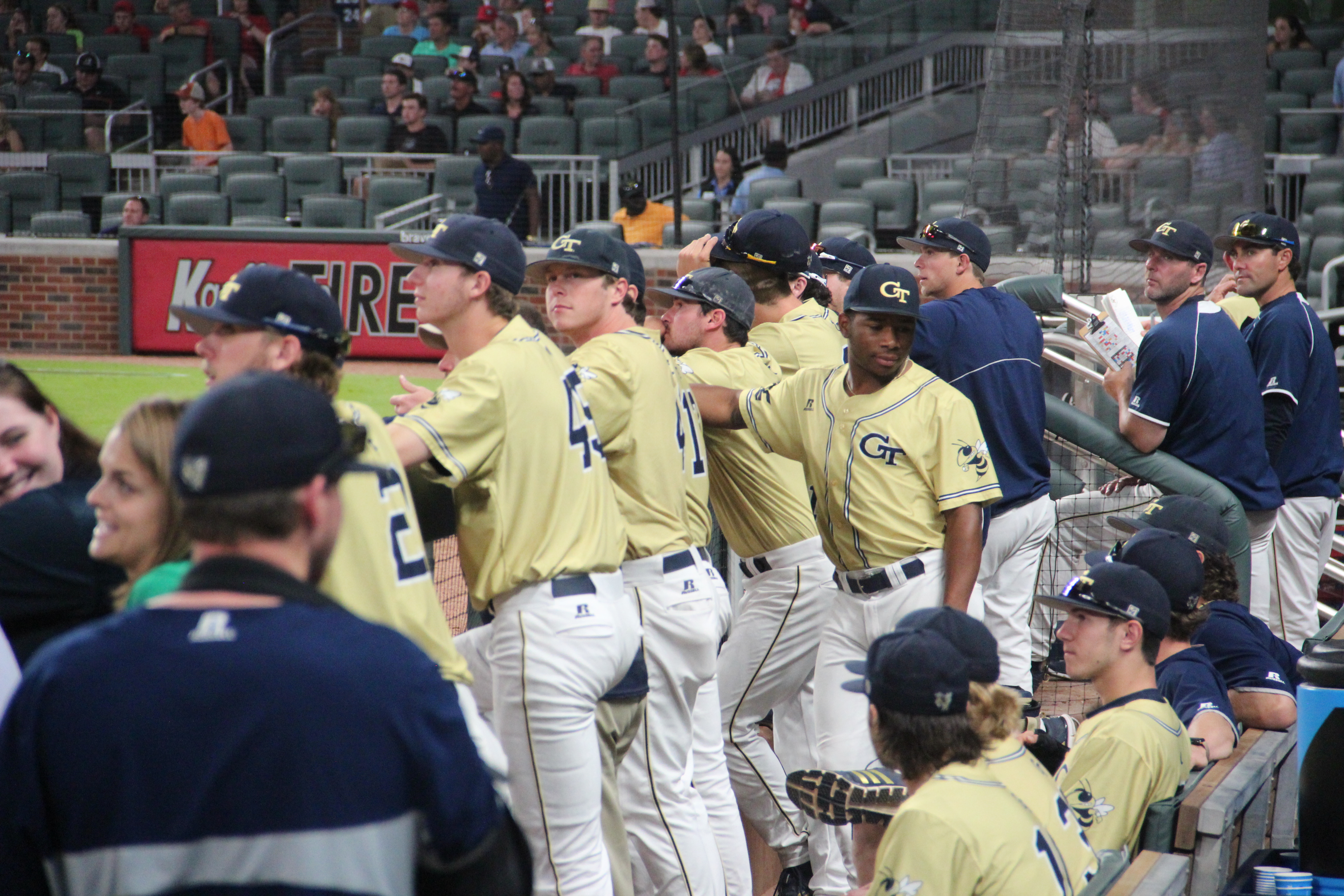
Georgia Tech players in a dugout at SunTrust Park in 2017

Georgia Tech baseball is notable for its high-scoring offenses and stout defenses. Before Tech had its own baseball field, it played at Brisbine Park.

A notable game was played in 1916, when the Cumberland College Bulldogs routed the Yellow Jackets 22–0. Seeking to avenge this loss, Georgia Tech baseball coach John Heisman, who was also the football coach at the time, invoked the two schools' previously agreed-upon scheduling contract that obligated Cumberland to play Georgia Tech in football. The resultant game became the most lopsided victory ever in the history of college football, carrying a score of 222–0 in favor of Georgia Tech.

The team's success was guided by great head coaches Jim Luck, Jim Morris, and Danny Hall. Luck was head coach from 1962–1981 and helped grow Georgia Tech baseball from an afterthought of a program into a solid regional program. Jim Morris was head coach from 1982–1993 and turned GT baseball into a national brand, winning four conference titles in a row from 1985–1988. After Morris left Tech for Miami, Danny Hall coached Tech from 1994 and posted over 1,000 wins over that span. He led Georgia Tech to over 20 years of NCAA regional play and its only three College World Series appearances in 1994, 2002, and 2006.

The current coach of Yellow Jacket baseball is James Ramsey, in his first season.

== Stadium ==
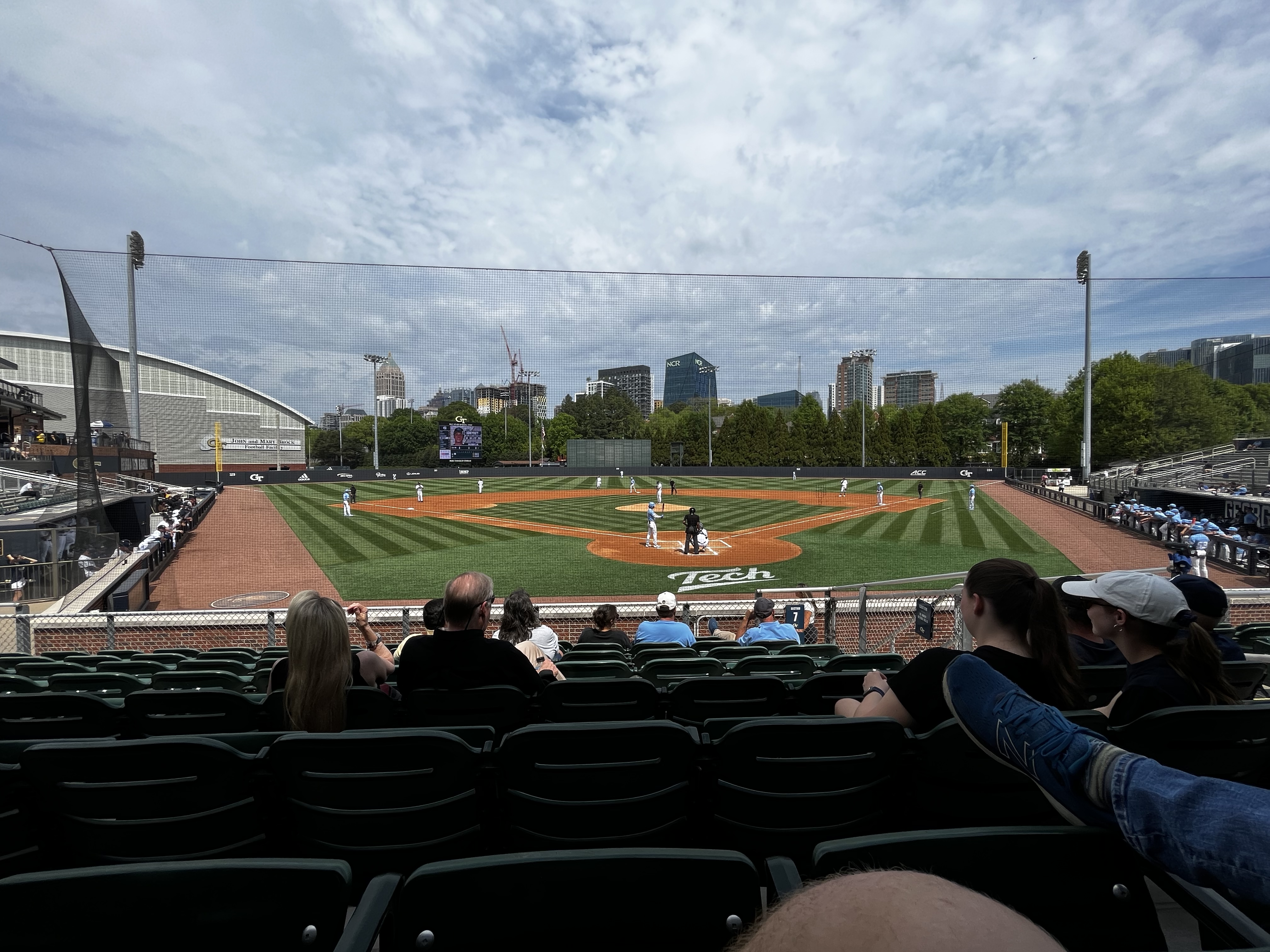

The Yellow Jackets play their home games in Russ Chandler Stadium.

== Head coaches ==
Coach	Years	Record	Pct
Charles Todd	1900–1901	12–9	.571
Sammy Strang	1902	5–8	.385
Charlie Irving	1903	9–9	.500
John Heisman	1904–1917	163–97–5	.627
Joe Bean	1918–1920	35–18	.660
Kid Clay	1921–1931	147–99–5	.607
Bobby Dodd	1932–1939	43–64–2	.404
Roy Mundorff	1940–1943	26–36–1	.421
Joe Pittard	1946–1961	169–173–7	.494
Jim Luck	1962–1981	320–280–5	.533
Jim Morris	1982–1993	504–244–1	.674
Danny Hall	1994–2025	1,244–676–1	.648
James Ramsey	2026–present	50–11	(.820)

== Year-by-year results ==
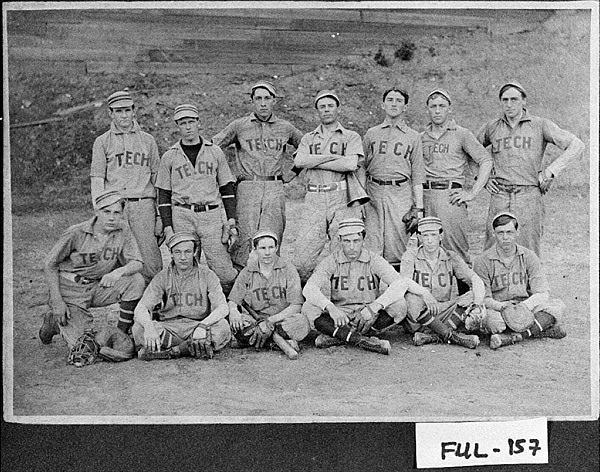
Georgia Tech Baseball 1907

Information Source: Archived 2011-05-22 at the Wayback Machine

Year-by-year results
Year	Coach	Record	Conference Record	Notes
1900	Todd	3–4		
1901	Todd	9–5		
1902	Sammy Strang	5–8		
1903	Irving	9–9		
1904	John Heisman	15–7		
1905	John Heisman	13–4		
1906	John Heisman	23–3		
1907	John Heisman	10–5–1		
1908	John Heisman	9–12		
1909	John Heisman	13–8–1		
1910	John Heisman	11–5–1		
1911	John Heisman	7–6		
1912	John Heisman	8–10		
1913	John Heisman	9–8		
1914	John Heisman	12–8		
1915	John Heisman	7–8–2		
1916	John Heisman	14–6		
1917	John Heisman	12–7		
1918	Joe Bean	10–7		
1919	Joe Bean	9–9		
1920	Joe Bean	16–2		
1921	Kid Clay	18–4–1		
1922	Kid Clay	14–9		
1923	Kid Clay	16–2–2		
1924	Kid Clay	9–14		
1925	Kid Clay	14–7		
1926	Kid Clay	21–4–1		
1927	Kid Clay	18–10		
1928	Kid Clay	15–6		
1929	Kid Clay	6–14–1		
1930	Kid Clay	8–16		
1931	Kid Clay	8–13		
1932	Bobby Dodd	4–11–2		
1933	Bobby Dodd	4–10	3–7 (SEC)	
1934	Bobby Dodd	10–10	8–9 (SEC)	
1935	Bobby Dodd	7–6	3–3 (SEC)	
1936	No team in 1936.			
1937	Bobby Dodd	4–7	4–7 (SEC)	
1938	Bobby Dodd	7–10	5–8 (SEC)	
1939	Bobby Dodd	7–10	3–9 (SEC)	
1940	Roy Mundorff	5–10–1	5–9–1 (SEC)	
1941	Roy Mundorff	10–8	10–8 (SEC)	
1942	Roy Mundorff	8–10	7–7 (SEC)	
1943	Roy Mundorff	3–8	2–5 (SEC)	
1944	No team in 1944.			
1945	No team in 1945.			
1946	Joe Pittard	10–2		Season played in July/August
1947	Joe Pittard	7–6	6–6 (SEC)	
1948	Joe Pittard	11–9	11–7 (SEC)	
1949	Joe Pittard	10–14	9–11 (SEC)	
1950	Joe Pittard	7–11	7–11 (SEC)	
1951	Joe Pittard	11–12	8–12 (SEC)	
1952	Joe Pittard	8–11–1	8–11–1 (SEC)	
1953	Joe Pittard	8–13	7–10 (SEC)	
1954	Joe Pittard	9–13–1	6–10 (SEC)	
1955	Joe Pittard	15–9	10–6 (SEC)	
1956	Joe Pittard	11–12	4–9 (SEC)	
1957	Joe Pittard	18–8–1	13–3 (SEC)	SEC Champion
1958	Joe Pittard	7–17	5–12 (SEC)	
1959	Joe Pittard	17–9–2	11–4 (SEC)	Lost in NCAA District 3 playoffs
1960	Joe Pittard	14–11	9–7 (SEC)	
1961	Joe Pittard	6–16–2	6–11 (SEC)	
1962	Jim Luck	8–16	6–11 (SEC)	
1963	Jim Luck	9–18	4–13 (SEC)	
1964	Jim Luck	9–15	3–10 (SEC)	
1965	Jim Luck	20–8–2		
1966	Jim Luck	14–16		
1967	Jim Luck	21–11		
1968	Jim Luck	21–13		
1969	Jim Luck	16–12		
1970	Jim Luck	17–7–1		
1971	Jim Luck	31–6		Lost in NCAA District 3 playoffs
1972	Jim Luck	21–10		
1973	Jim Luck	20–6–2		
1974	Jim Luck	20–17		
1975	Jim Luck	12–17		
1976	Jim Luck	12–22		
1977	Jim Luck	18–12		
1978	Jim Luck	14–15		
1979	Jim Luck	15–16		
1980	Jim Luck	8–19	3–10 (ACC)	
1981	Jim Luck	14–24	1–13 (ACC)	
1982	Jim Morris	29–20	6–8 (ACC)	
1983	Jim Morris	38–15	6–8 (ACC)	
1984	Jim Morris	36–19	5–7 (ACC)	
1985	Jim Morris	42–19–1	6–7–1 (ACC)	Lost in NCAA South Regional
1986	Jim Morris	45–23	10–4 (ACC)	Lost in NCAA Atlantic Regional
1987	Jim Morris	51–14	17–4 (ACC)	Lost in NCAA Northeast Regional
1988	Jim Morris	45–24	12–8 (ACC)	Lost in NCAA Atlantic Regional
1989	Jim Morris	38–26	13–6 (ACC)	Lost in NCAA East Regional
1990	Jim Morris	46–25	9–9 (ACC)	Lost in NCAA South Regional
1991	Jim Morris	42–26	12–8 (ACC)	Lost in NCAA Atlantic Regional
1992	Jim Morris	45–19	14–9 (ACC)	Lost in NCAA East Regional
1993	Jim Morris	47–14	16–6 (ACC)	Lost in NCAA Atlantic Regional
1994	Danny Hall	50–17	16–8 (ACC)	2nd Place at the 1994 College World Series
1995	Danny Hall	38–22	16–8 (ACC)	Lost in NCAA Midwest Regional
1996	Danny Hall	40–24	13–11 (ACC)	Lost in NCAA South Regional
1997	Danny Hall	46–15	19–4 (ACC)	Lost in NCAA Midwest Regional
1998	Danny Hall	41–22	14–9 (ACC)	Lost in NCAA Midwest Regional
1999	Danny Hall	38–20	12–12 (ACC)	
2000	Danny Hall	50–16	18–6 (ACC)	Lost in NCAA Atlanta Super Regional
2001	Danny Hall	41–20	13–11 (ACC)	Lost in NCAA Athens Regional
2002	Danny Hall	52–16	14–9 (ACC)	5th Place at the 2002 College World Series
2003	Danny Hall	44–18	17–7 (ACC)	Lost in NCAA Atlanta Regional
2004	Danny Hall	44–21	18–5 (ACC)	Lost in NCAA Atlanta Super Regional
2005	Danny Hall	45–19	22–8 (ACC)	Lost in NCAA Atlanta Super Regional
2006	Danny Hall	50–18	19–11 (ACC)	7th Place at the 2006 College World Series
2007	Danny Hall	32–25	15–14 (ACC)	
2008	Danny Hall	41–21	16–14 (ACC)	Lost in NCAA Athens Regional
2009	Danny Hall	38–19	17–10–1 (ACC)	Lost in NCAA Atlanta Regional
2010	Danny Hall	47–15	21–9 (ACC)	Lost in NCAA Atlanta Regional
2011	Danny Hall	42–21	21–8 (ACC)	Lost in NCAA Atlanta Regional
2012	Danny Hall	38–26	12–18 (ACC)	Won ACC tournament, Lost in NCAA Gainesville Regional
2013	Danny Hall	37–27	15–15 (ACC)	Lost in NCAA Nashville Regional
2014	Danny Hall	37–27	14–16 (ACC)	Won ACC tournament, Lost in NCAA Oxford Regional
2015	Danny Hall	32–23	13–17 (ACC)	
2016	Danny Hall	38–25	13–16 (ACC)	Lost in NCAA Gainesville Regional
2017	Danny Hall	27–28	11–19 (ACC)	
2018	Danny Hall	31–27	14–16 (ACC)	
2019	Danny Hall	43–19	19-11 (ACC)	ACC Coastal Division champions, Lost in NCAA Atlanta Regional, No. 3 National Seed
2020	Danny Hall	11–5	2-1 (ACC)	Season Cancelled Due to COVID-19 Pandemic
2021	Danny Hall	31–25	21-15 (ACC)	ACC Coastal Division Champions, T-3rd ACC Tournament, Lost in NCAA Nashville Regional
2022	Danny Hall	36–24	16–16 (ACC)	Lost in NCAA Knoxville Regional
2023	Danny Hall	30–27	12–18 (ACC)	
2024	Danny Hall	33–25	15–15 (ACC)	Lost in NCAA Athens Regional
2025	Danny Hall	41–19	19–11 (ACC)	ACC regular season champions, Lost in NCAA Oxford Regional
2026	James Ramsey	50–11	25–5 (ACC)	ACC regular season and tournament champions, Lost in NCAA Atlanta Regional

== Georgia Tech in the NCAA tournament ==
- The NCAA Division I baseball tournament started in 1947.
- The format of the tournament has changed through the years.

Year	Record	Pct	Notes
1959	1–2		District 3 at Gastonia, NC District
1971	3–2		District 3 at Gastonia, NC
1985	3–2		South II Regional at Tallahassee, FL Regional
1986	3–2		Atlantic Regional at Coral Gables, FL
1987	0–2		Northeast Regional at Atlanta, GA
1988	2–2		Atlantic Regional at Coral Gables, FL
1989	1–2		East Regional at Gainesville, FL
1990	0–2		South I Regional at Baton Rouge, LA
1991	2–2		Atlantic Regional at Tallahassee, FL
1992	2–2		East Regional at Gainesville, FL
1993	2–2		Atlantic Regional at Atlanta, GA
1994	7–2		Midwest II Regional Winner at Wichita, KS, College World Series Runner Up
1995	0–2		Mideast Regional at Knoxville, TN
1996	3–2		South II Regional at Baton Rouge, LA
1997	2–2		Mideast Regional at Starkville, MS
1998	3–2		Midwest Regional at Wichita, KS
2000	3–2		3rd National Seed, Atlanta Regional Winner, Atlanta Super Regional
2001	0–2		Athens Regional
2002	6–2		Atlanta Regional Winner, Atlanta Super Regional Winner, College World Series
2003	0–2		3rd National Seed, Atlanta Regional
2004	3–2		4th National Seed, Atlanta Regional Winner, Atlanta Super Regional
2005	3–3		2nd National Seed, Atlanta Regional Winner, Atlanta Super Regional
2006	5–2		8th National Seed, Atlanta Regional Winner, Atlanta Super Regional Winner, College World Series
2008	2–2		Athens Regional
2009	3–2		Atlanta Regional
2010	2–2		8th National Seed, Atlanta Regional
2011	2–2		Atlanta Regional
2012	2–2		Gainesville Regional
2013	3–2		Nashville Regional
2014	1–2		Oxford Regional
2016	2–2		Gainesville Regional
2019	2-2		3rd National Seed, Atlanta Regional
2020	N/A		no tournament Held Due to COVID-19 Cancelling Season
2021	2-2		Nashville Regional
2022	2-2		Knoxville Regional
2024	2–2		Athens Regional
2025	1–2		Oxford Regional
2026	2–2		2nd National Seed, Atlanta Regional
TOTALS	82–75	.522	

== Award winners ==
=== Dick Howser Trophy ===
Dick Howser Trophy winners
Year	Player	Position
1994	Jason Varitek	C
2000	Mark Teixeira	3B

=== Golden Spikes Award ===
Golden Spikes Award winners
Year	Player	Position
1994	Jason Varitek	C

=== Johnny Bench Award ===
Johnny Bench Award winners
Year	Player	Position
2018	Joey Bart	C
2022	Kevin Parada	C
2026	Vahn Lackey	C

Individual Conference awards

=== ACC Player of the Year ===
ACC Player of the Year
Year	Player	Position
1987	Riccardo Ingram	OF
1991	Andy Bruce	3B
1993	Jason Varitek	C
2000	Mark Teixeira	3B
2018	Joey Bart	C

=== ACC Pitcher of the Year ===
ACC Pitcher of the Year
Year	Player
2009	Deck McGuire

=== ACC Coach of the Year ===
ACC Coach of the Year
Year(s)	Coach
1983, 1987, 1993	Jim Morris
1997, 2000, 2005, 2019, 2025	Danny Hall
2026	James Ramsey

== Former players ==
Some notable Georgia Tech baseball players are Erskine Mayer, Kevin Brown, Nomar Garciaparra, Jason Varitek, Matt Murton, Jay Payton, Mark Teixeira, Blake Wood, Matt Wieters, Charlie Blackmon, and Joey Bart.

== See also ==
- List of NCAA Division I baseball programs
